= School Number 6 (Davenport, Iowa) =

- U.S. National Register of Historic Places
- Davenport Register of Historic Properties
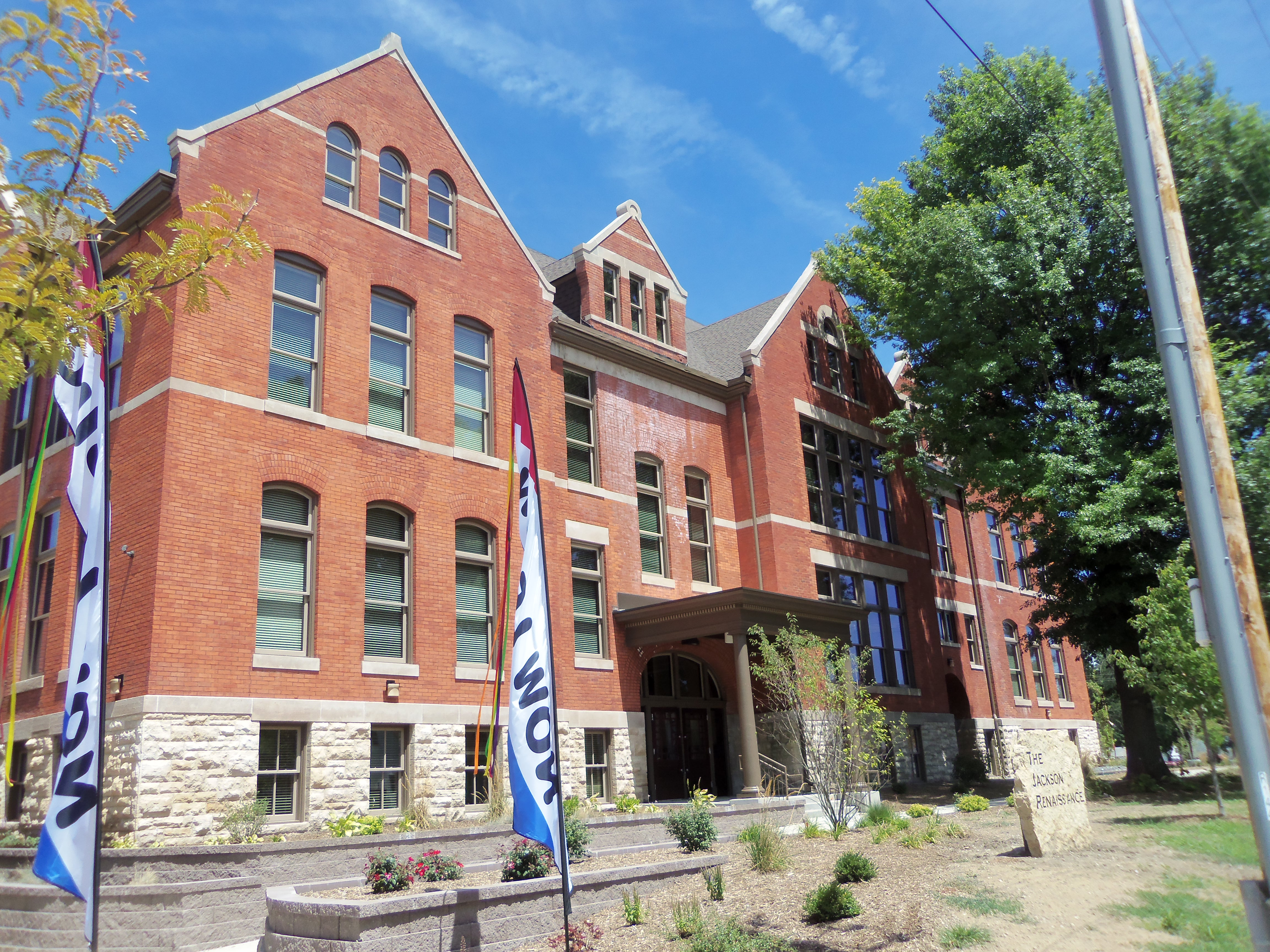

- Location within Iowa Location within the United States
- Location: 1420 W. 16th St. Davenport, Iowa
- Coordinates: 41°32′9″N 90°35′41″W
- Area: less than one acre
- Built: 1893, 1903
- Built by: Oelerish and Peters; A. Steckel & Meyer
- Architect: Frederick G. Clausen, et al.
- Architectural style: Late Victorian
- NRHP reference No.: 11000722
- DRHP No.: 53

Significant dates
- Added to NRHP: October 6, 2011
- Designated DRHP: May 11, 2011

School Number 6, also known as Jackson School and Holy Family School, is an historic building located in Davenport, Iowa, United States. It was listed on the Davenport Register of Historic Properties and on the National Register of Historic Places in 2011.

== History ==
School Number 6 actually began as School Number 11 and located on Locust Street, just west of the Chicago, Rock Island and Pacific Railroad crossing. It was replaced in 1858 by a two-room, frame school building at the present location. In 1874, the lot to the east of the school was purchased for a playground from the neighboring Presbyterian Church. The school was located in the Hamburg neighborhood, a large German neighborhood whose lower portion has been designated a historic district. As the area population increased, the Davenport Community School District determined it needed to provide a larger building. This was during the superintendency of J.B. Young when eight new grammar schools and a high school were built and six older buildings were extensively remodeled. Prominent Davenport architect Frederick G. Clausen was chosen to design the new School Number 6. Local contractors Oelerish and Peters were responsible for construction, which cost $19,400.

The new school building was opened in October 1893. Classes were still taught in German even though only 36 of the 420 students had been born in Germany. In 1868, two-thirds of the students in School Number 6 had been born there. When it opened, the school educated students through the 9th grade. School Number 6 was one of the first schools in Davenport to have a kindergarten program. Newcomb Presbyterian Chapel was leased in 1896 for more classroom space. That ended the following year when Taylor School was completed and 50 students were transferred there. However, the student population here and throughout the district continued to increase. A bond referendum passed in 1902 to fund the expansion of school facilities. The architectural firm of Clausen and Burrows designed the expansion of School Number 6. A. Steckel & Meyer built the addition for $14,675. It was completed in 1903.

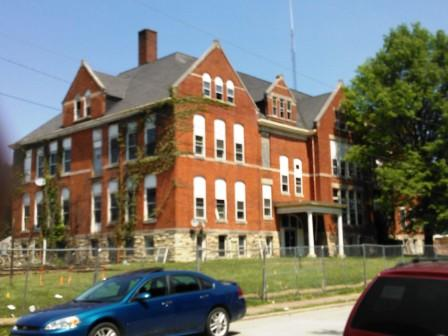
The building in 1912 prior to renovation

In 1908, the school district decided to rename its elementary schools after former U.S. Presidents. School Number 6 was named after Andrew Jackson. Johnson School opened in 1910 and alleviated some of the crowding at Jackson. The school district adopted the 6-3-3 grade system in 1919 with the elementary schools housing kindergarten plus grades 1-6. The Davenport Free Public Library had been established in 1900 and Jackson School served as one of its branches beginning about 1922. The library system also operated the school libraries at that time. The former Newcomb Presbyterian Chapel building was acquired in 1925 and taken down for a new playground. In 1938, it was proposed that the Davenport school district replace its older elementary schools. All the replacement schools, but one, were built in new locations. The old school buildings, including Jackson, were closed in 1940.

From 1943 to 1964 the building served as a parochial school for Holy Family Catholic Church. The parish school had been organized in 1919 and it was housed in a small brick building behind the church. The Rev. T.V. Lawlor bought the former Jackson School building for more space. Because the parish was raising money for a school building on parish property they made no changes to the Jackson building. The Congregation of the Humility of Mary, a Catholic religious order of sisters, acquired the building from the parish and converted part of the building into a convent. The sisters vacated the building in 1968. Beginning in 1970 it was used as an office building. In 2010 the building was purchased by Renaissance Realty Group of Chicago to renovate into housing for senior citizens. It has been divided into 48 apartments and is called The Jackson Renaissance. They previously renovated the historic Taylor School building.

== Architecture ==
In addition to its educational significance, the former school building is also significant for its architecture. Because of the Panic of 1893, the former Jackson School building lacks the towers, bays, and other architectural embellishments found on the non-extant Tyler School building completed in 1892 or the Taylor School building completed in 1897. Its this economy of design and its seamless addition that makes this building significant. The 2½-story brick structure is built on a raised ashlar sandstone basement. It features Roman Arch entrance portals, flattened arch fenestrations, Neoclassical porches, three gabled pavilions, and it is capped by a hip roof with dormers. The 1902 addition is on the west side of the building.
