= Claim House =

Claim House may refer to:

- Claim House (Davenport, Iowa), NRHP-nominated
- St. Nicholas Hotel (Omaha, Nebraska)
