= Municipal Inn =

Historic structure in Davenport, Iowa

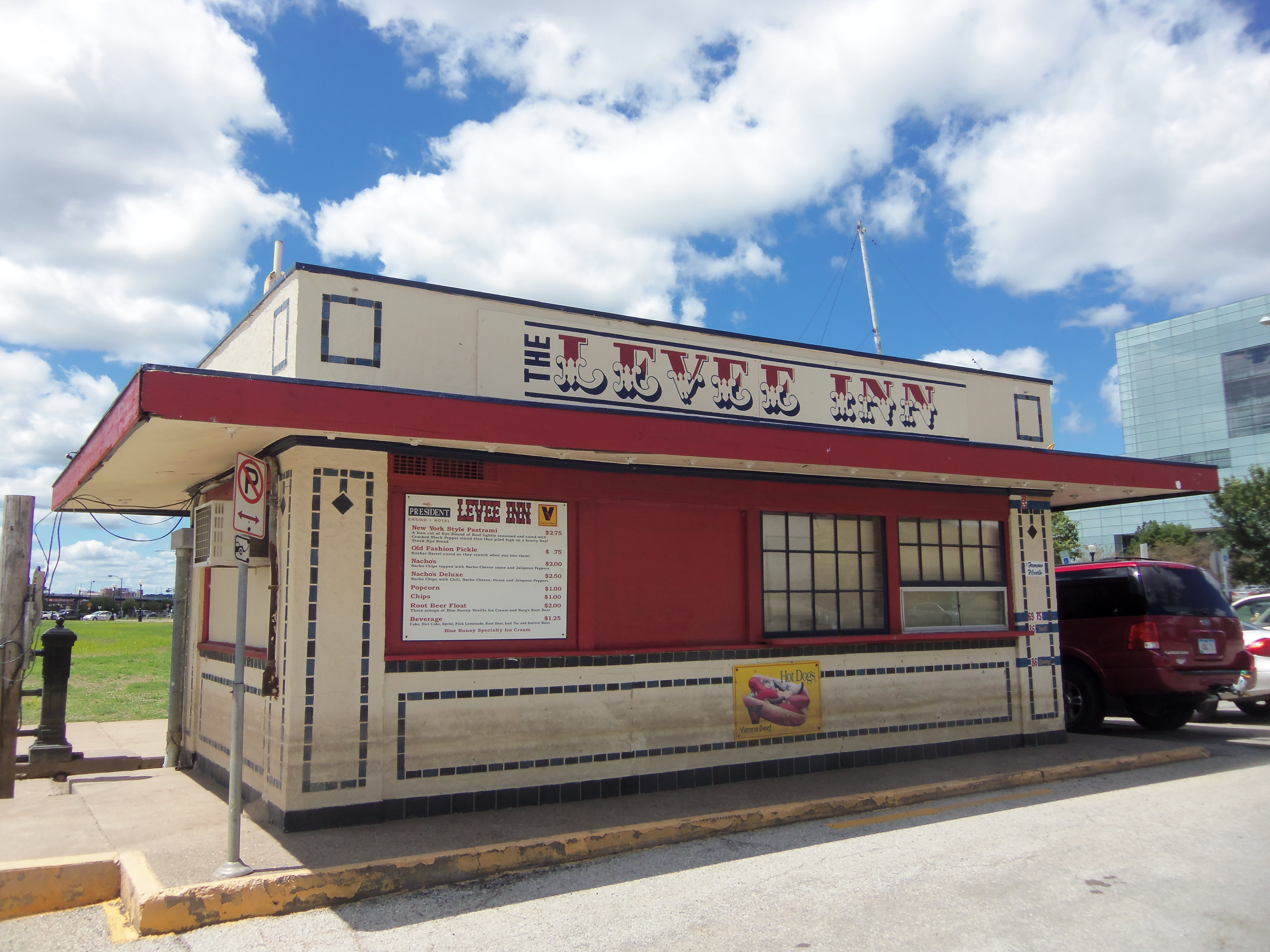

- Location within Iowa
- 41°31′8.9544″N 90°34′32.304″W
- Location: LeClaire Park; Davenport, Iowa

History
- Built: 1929

Site notes
- Architect: Clausen, Kruse & Klein
- Architectural style: Art Moderne
- Governing body: Private

Davenport Register of Historic Properties
- Designated: March 17, 1999

Municipal Inn is a historic structure located in LeClaire Park along the Mississippi River in downtown Davenport, Iowa, United States. It was listed on the Davenport Register of Historic Properties on March 17, 1999. It is also known as the Levee Inn.

== History ==
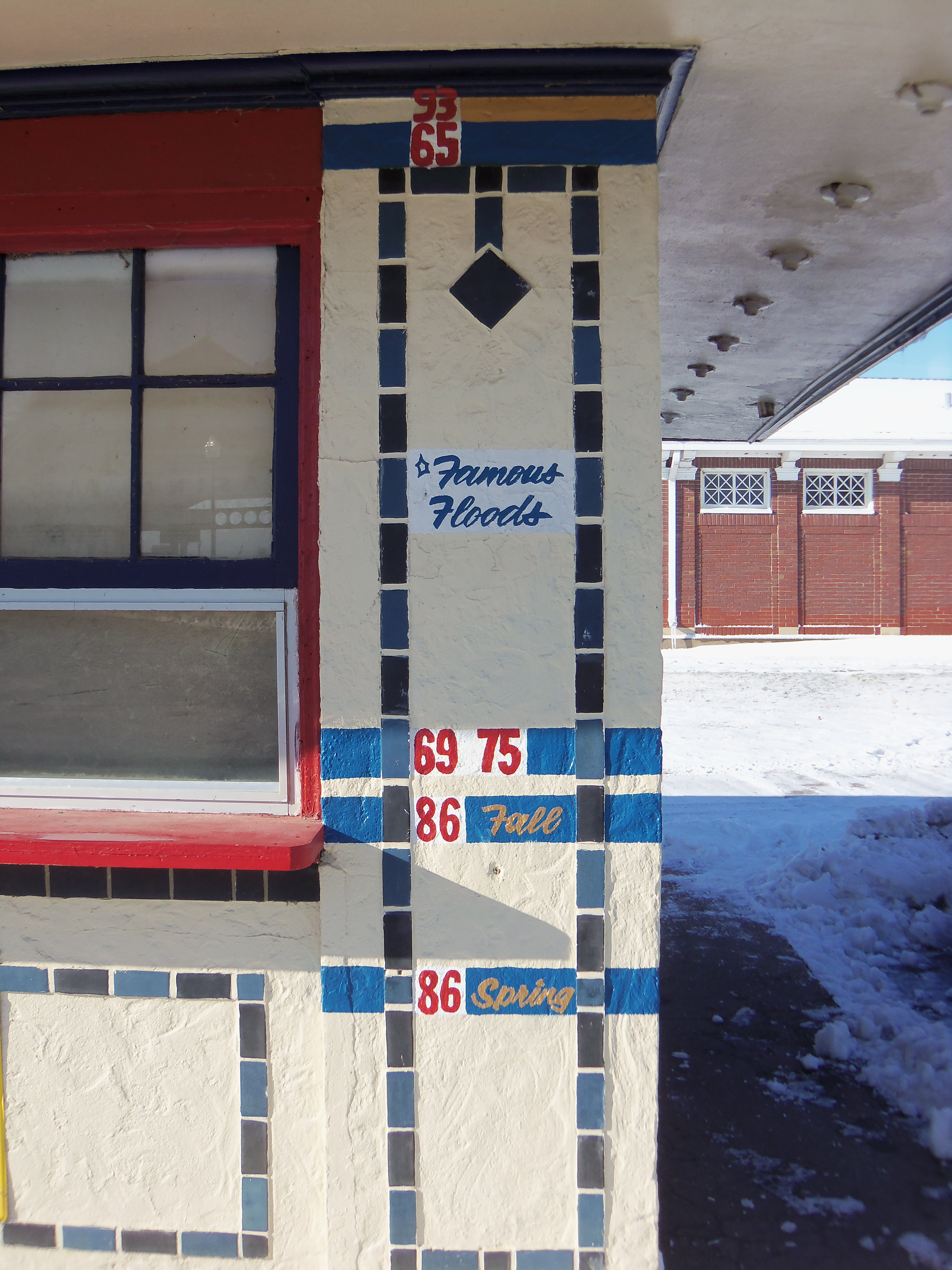
Mississippi River flood measurements

According to the records of the city's Levee Improvement Commission, R.D. Ackley was given a 10-year lease for the building on June 14, 1927. The city issued a building permit on January 11, 1928. The structure was designed by the prominent Davenport architectural firm of Clausen, Kruse & Klein and was completed in 1929. They had also designed the W.D. Petersen Memorial Music Pavilion and Municipal Stadium, now Modern Woodmen Park, which are also on the riverfront. Other people who have operated a business there include Archie Weindruch, who was one of the longest proprietors and closed it in 1990. The President Riverboat Casino re-opened it a year later as the Iowa Pork Stop. Shonnie Holmes operated it from 1994 to 1995 as the Levee Inn. The President returned as the operator in 1999 before it closed again. The building has been used over the years for measuring floods on the Mississippi. High-water marks are still on the inn. The 1993 flood came to about the eaves.

== Architecture ==
Although small in size, the structure shows the same symmetry, attention to detail and use of ornamentation that Clausen, Kruse & Klein used in their larger buildings. The building follows the clean, angular lines of the Art Moderne style. Ornamental bands of tile form intersecting squares and rectangles on the exterior stucco. Originally it featured four concrete urns on each corner of the roof and a sign with the business name that extended the length of the building between two flag poles. Tiles in blue and orange above the windows are now under a canopy that was added at a later date.
