= Johnson School =

Johnson School may refer to:

- Johnson School (Millsboro, Delaware)
- Johnson School (Davenport, Iowa)
- Johnson School (North Adams, Massachusetts)
- Cornell Johnson Graduate School of Management, Cornell University
