= The Col Ballroom =

- Saengerfest Halle
- U.S. National Register of Historic Places
- Davenport Register of Historic Properties
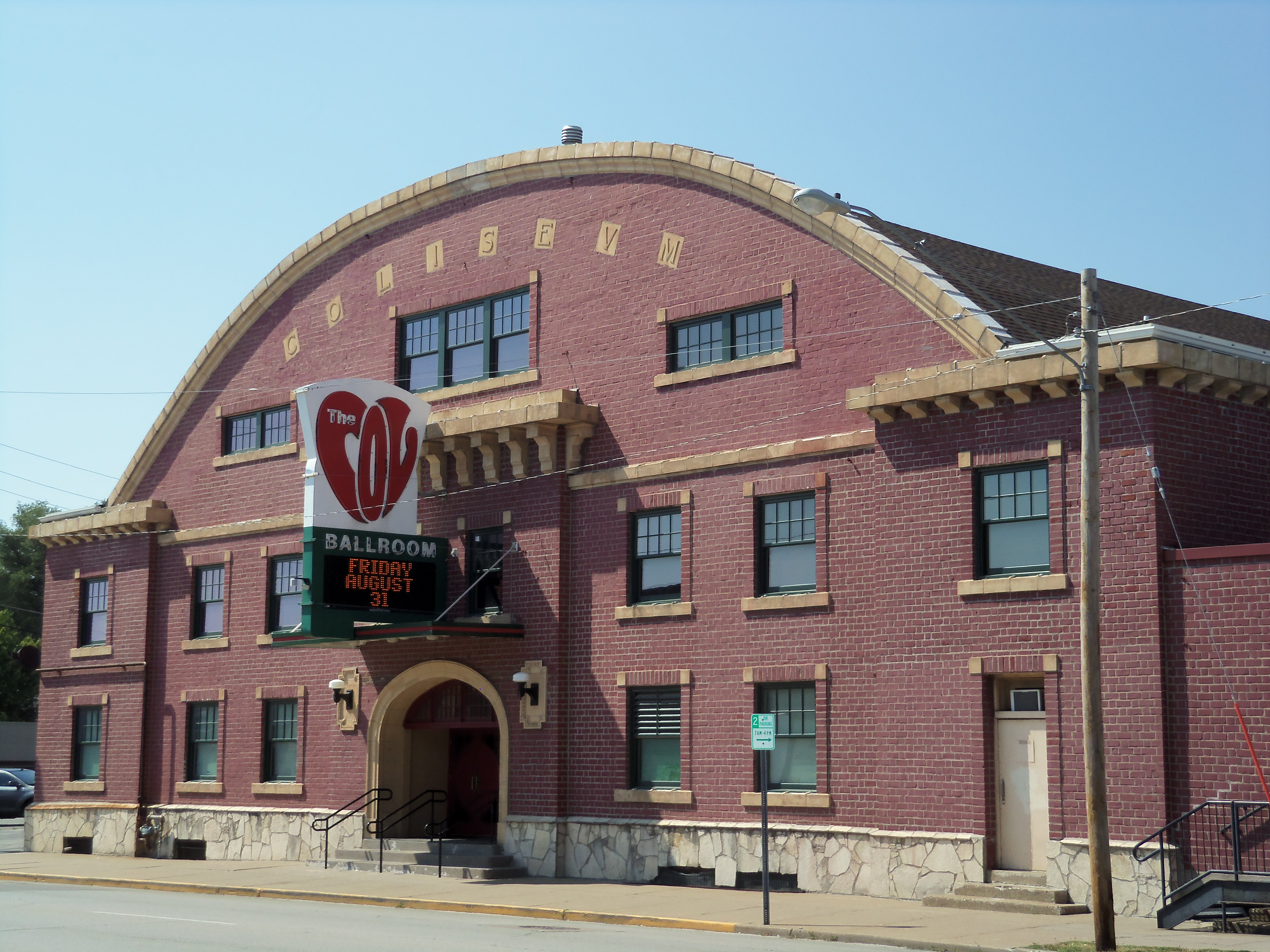
- The Col Ballroom in 2012

- Location within Iowa Location within the United States
- Location: 1012 W. 4th St. Davenport, Iowa
- Coordinates: 41°31′25″N 90°35′16″W
- Area: less than one acre
- Built: 1914
- Built by: Oelrich & Company
- Architect: Clausen & Burrows
- MPS: Davenport MRA
- NRHP reference No.: 83002494
- DRHP No.: 23

Significant dates
- Added to NRHP: July 7, 1983
- Designated DRHP: August 5, 1998

The Col Ballroom is a historic building located in the West End of Davenport, Iowa, United States. It was listed on the National Register of Historic Places and on the Davenport Register of Historic Properties as the Saengerfest Halle.

== History ==
=== Saengerfest Halle ===
Davenport's strong music tradition is due in large part to the influx of German immigrants into the city starting in the late 1840s. They founded numerous music groups in the city before 1900. The groups with longer staying power included: the Liedertafel (founded in 1848), Maennerchor (1851), Strasser's German Union Brass Band (1856), Germania Band (1883), and three other groups founded in the 1850s included Gesang Chor Der Turngemeinde, Deutscher Saengerbund, and Onretti Verein. There were also short-lived music organizations: Germania Saengerchor, Gesang Verein Teutonia, Eintracht Glee Club, Claus Groth Singing Society, Thalia Verein, Harrigaria Maennerchor, and the Davenport Saengerbund. In 1858 the city hosted the third annual Saengerfest, or singer's festival, which drew people from throughout the Mississippi River Valley.

The largest music event in Davenport's history took place in 1898 when it hosted the 18th annual Saengerfest. It brought together ten local German singing groups as the United Singers of Davenport. Together they organized and hosted the event. The festival included 1,200 singers from Davenport, Eau Claire, Wisconsin, Elgin, Illinois, Elkader, Iowa, La Crosse, Wisconsin, Manning, Iowa, Moline, Illinois, Peoria, Illinois, Rock Island, Illinois and St. Louis, Missouri. The event drew German-Americans from throughout the Midwest, and Western Union added extra German operators so as to get news of the festival out over the wires. An estimated 100,000 people attended the four-day event. The festival ended with an outdoor concert at Schuetzen Park that was attended by 12,000 people.

Preparations for the festival included building a 4,000-seat auditorium for the event. A holding company built the wood structure for $4,500. After the festival ended the hall was used as a warehouse. In 1906 a second floor was added by new owners and the building was dedicated as a dance hall called The Coliseum. It was destroyed by fire on October 21, 1913.

=== The Coliseum ===
In November 1914, the new Coliseum was opened by owner Leo Kerker. The new building is located across West Fourth Street from where the original Saengerfesthalle was located. It was designed by local architects Clausen & Burrows and constructed by local contractor Oelrich & Company. The building has a steel frame covered with brick. It has an arched roof, and individual tiles across the top of the façade each have a letter that spells out the word "Coliseum". The structure also features two-story corner pavilions and brick pilasters on the side elevations. A sign with the name "The Col Ballroom" hangs over the main entrance. The words are in the shape of a heart. In the early 1990s, the building was extensively renovated both inside and out. Ownership of The Col was passed to Don Wachel. The Quad Cities Mexican American Organization took over ownership in 1995. The building has operated as a ballroom and concert venue ever since. Lee Neece took over the ownership in 2014 and Leigh Macias Reitz in 2015.

A back wall of the building has the autographs of performers who played there. Artist who performed at The Col include: Duke Ellington, B.B. King, The Everly Brothers, The Beach Boys, Little Richard, Chuck Berry, Johnny Cash, Muddy Waters, Jimi Hendrix, Slipknot, Danzig, and Stevie Ray Vaughan. The Col Ballroom was added to the National Register of Historic Places in 1983, the Davenport Register of Historic Properties in 1998, and it was inducted into the Iowa Rock and Roll Music Association hall of fame in 1999. The venue closed as a ballroom and performance venue on October 29, 2018.
