= Davenport Register of Historic Properties =

Location of Davenport in Scott County and Scott County's location in the state of Iowa

This is a list of the Davenport Register of Historic Properties in Davenport, Iowa, United States.

The historic preservation movement began in the city of Davenport in the mid-1970s with the renovation of several historic structures. A comprehensive study of the city's neighborhoods, districts and architecture was begun in 1978. The study was conducted in three phases. The first two phases were carried out from 1979 to 1982 and the third phase from 1982 to 1983. The results were published in two volumes. Davenport—Where the Mississippi Runs West reported on the first two phases and Davenport Architecture—Tradition and Transition reported on the third phase. A Multiple Resource nomination was submitted to the National Register of Historic Places that included 12 districts, more than 1,650 buildings on 350 parcels. By March 1985 all the districts and 249 properties were listed on the national register.

The Historic Preservation Commission was established in 1992, and the historic preservation ordinance was passed the same year. Davenport became a Certified Local Government in the state of Iowa. It was now responsible to review local projects participating in state and national preservation programs. It was also able to exercise some control over the modification and/or demolition of historic buildings in the city. The historic preservation ordinance also allowed the establishment of a local register of historic properties. The first four properties were added in 1992. As of 2019, there are 59 properties listed, of which 26 are individually listed on the National Register of Historic Places and 22 are contributing properties in a national historic district on the National Register. The Iowa Soldiers' Orphans' Home/Annie Wittenmyer Complex is listed twice.

== Current listings ==
The list below contains properties on the Davenport Register of Historic Places in alphabetical order:

	Name	Image	Listed	Location	Area	Summary
1	E.P. Adler House		June 2, 1993	2104 Main St. 41°32′27″N 90°34′33″W	Central	Colonial Revival style home of newspaper publisher E.P. Adler. It is listed on the National Register of Historic Places.
2	Anken Flats	Upload image	October 7, 1998	508 W. 3rd St. 41°31′21″N 90°34′50″W	Downtown	An apartment building that stood in the West Third Street Historic District that is listed on the National Register of Historic Places. It was torn down in 2003.
3	Frank & John Bredow House		February 2, 2000	822 Gaines St. 41°31′45″N 90°35′0″W	Central	Greek Revival style home that is a contributing property in the Hamburg Historic District, which is listed on the National Register of Historic Places.
4	Peter Bruchmann House	Upload image	May 2, 2009	1125 Jersey Ridge Rd. 41°31′54.31″N 90°32′35.54″W	East	House that was a contributing property in the Village of East Davenport Historic District on the National Register of Historic Places. It has subsequently been torn down.
5	Claim House		October 7, 1992	1329 College Ave. 41°32′2.75″N 90°33′23″W	East	Built by George L. Davenport in 1832 or 1833 to protect his claim on his land. It is the oldest building in Davenport.
6	Miles Collins House		June 2, 1993	1234 E. 29th St. 41°32′58″N 90°33′26″W	East	Classical Revival style home built in 1860 as a farmhouse.
7	Credit Island		February 3, 1999	Credit Island Lane; 41°29′45″N 90°36′56″W	West	Site of a battle in the War of 1812 between the U.S. Army, under the command of Major Zachary Taylor, and the Sauk tribe who were supporting the British Army. Today the park is a recreation area.
8	Davenport City Hall		June 2, 1993	226 W. 4th St. 41°31′27″N 90°34′35″W	Downtown	Richardsonian Romanesque style building built in 1895 as the seat of Davenport's government. It is listed on the National Register of Historic Places.
9	Davenport Public Library-Edward Durell Stone Building		January 23, 2019	321 N. Main St. 41°31′23.5″N 90°34′30.7″W	Downtown	New Formalism style building designed by Edward Durell Stone. It was completed in 1969. The main branch of the public library is a contributing property in the Davenport Downtown Commercial Historic District.
10	Henry Deutsch House	Upload image	January 15, 2008	2101 Main St. 41°32′26.38″N 90°34′32.10″W	Central	House in the Vander Veer Park Historic District that has subsequently been torn down.
11	Dillon Memorial		June 2, 1993	100 S. Main St. 41°31′12″N 90°34′32″W	Downtown	Classical Revival structure built in 1918 and dedicated to Davenport native Judge John Forrest Dillon. It is listed on the National Register of Historic Places.
12	First Federal and Savings and Loan Association		January 27, 2016	131 West 3rd St. 41°31′19.6″N 90°34′30.8″W	Downtown	Modern movement structure built in 1966 and housed several different financial companies over the years. It is listed on the National Register of Historic Places.
13	Decker French House	Upload image	March 17, 1999	1044 Pershing Ave. 41°31′50″N 90°34′16.5″W	Central	Prairie style residence built in 1911 for George Decker French, whose family was associated with wheel manufacturer French & Hecht. It was owned by Palmer College of Chiropractic and housed apartments. It was torn down in 2010.
14	Germania Miller/Standard Hotel		August 7, 1996	712 W. 2nd St. 41°31′18″N 90°35′1″W	Downtown	Former hotel built in 1871 that housed many German immigrants when they first arrived in Davenport. It now serves as a center and museum for German-American culture.
15	Hamburg Historic District		November 1, 1999	41°31′36″N 90°34′57″W	Central	Residential district above downtown Davenport where middle and upper class German immigrants settled in the mid to late 19th century. The local district is smaller than the district on the National Register of Historic Places.
16	Hillside		December 2, 1992	One Prospect Dr. 41°31′44″N 90°33′11″W	East	Colonial Revival mansion that was built in 1906 overlooking the Mississippi River. It was designed by Frederick G. Clausen for Charles Schuler, who owned Schuler Coal. It is listed on the National Register of Historic Places.
17	Hose Station No. 1		June 2, 1999	117 Perry St. 41°31′15″N 90°34′20″W	Downtown	Built in 1877 in the Italianate style as Davenport's first fire station. It is listed on the National Register of Historic Places.
18	Hose Station No. 4		June 2, 1993	2301 E. 11th St. 41°31′48″N 90°32′42″W	East	Built in 1931 in the Italianate style in what is now known as the Village of East Davenport. The former fire station now houses the International Fire Museum. It is a contributing property in the Davenport Village Historic District listed on the National Register of Historic Places.
19	House at 821 Ripley St.		April 2, 2003	821 Ripley St. 41°31′42″N 90°34′42″W	Central	A small Frame house; a contributing property in the Hamburg Historic District.
20	Indian Springs Park		October 7, 2005	1000 Spring St. 41°31′49.67″N 90°32′57.19″W	East	A park that features a spring that was used by Native Americans, early travelers and settlers. It is a contributing property in the Village of East Davenport Historic District on the National Register of Historic Places.
21	Iowa Reform Building		January 16, 2002	526 W. 2nd St. 41°31′17″N 90°34′52″W	Downtown	Built c. 1892 to house a German-language newspaper, the Iowa Reform, which remained in print until 1943. It continues to serve as a commercial building and is listed on the National Register of Historic Places.
22	Iowa Soldier's Orphans Home		May 1, 2001	2800 Eastern Ave. 41°33′2″N 90°33′21″W	East	Orphanage founded by Annie Wittenmyer on the site of a former Union Army camp, Camp Kinsman, after the American Civil War. The complex now houses non-profit organizations. It is listed on the National Register of Historic Places.
23	Jackson School/School No. 6		May 11, 2011	1420 W. 16th St.. 41°32′5″N 90°35′10″W	West	Former school building built in 1903. It is listed on the National Register of Historic Places.
24	Christian Jipp Home & Grocery		July 5, 2005	730-732 Gaines St. 41°31′55″N 90°34′33″W	Central	Combination retail and residential space built by German immigrant Christian Jipp. The contributing property in the Hamburg Historic District now serves as the Architectural Rescue Shop.
25	Johnson School		November 30, 2004	1730 Wilkes Ave. 41°32′16″N 90°36′14″W	West	A former public elementary school that now houses commercial space.
26	John F. Kelly Company Wholesale Groceries Building		November 8, 2017	225 E. 2nd St. 41°31′55″N 90°34′33″W	Downtown	Founded in 1884, the grocery wholesaler had this building constructed in 1910. An addition was completed five years later. It was designed by Charles R. Spink and built by Harry Phillips.
27	Lambrite-Iles-Petersen House		July 25, 2012	510 W. 6th St. 41°31′33.71″N 90°34′49.14″W	Central	Italian Villa designed by John Cochrane and built around 1857. It is a contributing property in the Hamburg Historic District.
28	Antoine LeClaire House		September 16, 1992	630 E. 7th St. 41°31′37″N 90°33′54″W	East	Italianate style mansion built in 1855 by Antoine LeClaire, one of the founders and promoters of the city of Davenport. It is listed on the National Register of Historic Places.
29	Lindsay Park		August 5, 1998	E. 11th St. 41°31′48″N 90°32′42″W	East	A city park situated in the Village of East Davenport and a part of both the Davenport Village Historic District and the McClellan Heights Historic District. It served as the parade grounds for Camp McClellan during the Civil War.
30	The Linograph Company Building		January 13, 2009	420 W. River Dr. 41°31′13″N 90°34′46″W	Downtown	Former industrial building designed by Clausen & Kruse and built in 1919. It has been converted to loft apartments and is listed on the National Register of Historic Places.
31	Henry Lischer House		January 6, 1993	624 W. 6th St. 41°31′43″N 90°35′0″W	Central	Italian Villa style residence designed by Fredrick G. Clausen in 1871 for Henry Lischer who was the owner and publisher of the German-language paper Der Demokrat. It is a contributing property in the Hamburg Historic District.
32	John Littig House		June 2, 1993	6035 Northwest Blvd; 41°34′29″N 90°35′51″W	North	The Shingle Style and Gothic Revival residence was built in 1867 and is listed on the National Register of Historic Places.
33	Marycrest College Campus		January 1, 2004	1607 W. 12th St. 41°31′56″N 90°34′33″W	West	Former Catholic college campus operated by the Congregation of the Humility of Mary. It is a historic district listed on the National Register of Historic Places.
34	Dr. Heinrich Matthey House		January 6, 1993	505 W. 6th St. 41°31′33″N 90°34′50″W	Central	The Georgian Revival style residence is a contributing property in the Hamburg Historic District.
35	Mississippi Hotel		August 3, 2005	102 E. 3rd St. 41°31′22″N 90°34′26″W	Downtown	Art Deco style hotel building that surrounds the former RKO Orpheum Theater, now called the Adler Theater. The former hotel is now an apartment building, and is listed on the National Register of Historic Places.
36	Mother Goose		February 7, 2007	Fejervary Children's Zoo; 41°31′53.58″N 90°36′17.24″W	West	Entranceway into the former zoo in the form of Mother Goose.
37	Municipal Inn		March 17, 1999	LeClaire Park; 41°31′8.95″N 90°34′32.30″W	Downtown	Also known as the Levee Inn, the small structure on the riverfront was designed by the Davenport architectural firm of Clausen, Kruse & Klein. It has served as a concession stand for most of its existence.
38	Oakdale Cemetery		November 24, 2015	2501 Eastern Ave. 41°32′47.6″N 90°32′52.16″W	East	Sprawling 78.1 acre Victorian cemetery, landscape designed by George F. de la Roche, with various structures designed by John W. Ross, Edward S. Hammatt, and Clausen & Kruse, incorporated in 1856, with burials from 1855 to the present day. It is listed on the National Register of Historic Places.
39	Octagon House		April 2, 1997	512 E. 6th St. 41°31′34″N 90°34′3″W	East	Built by Davenport merchant Henry H. "Variety" Smith in 1854 based on the philosophy of phrenologist Orson Fowler. It is listed on the National Register of Historic Places.
40	Old St. Luke's Hospital		February 3, 1999	121 W. 8th St. 41°31′40″N 90°34′30″W	Central	Italianate style residence built by Daniel Newcomb that housed St. Luke's Hospital when it began in 1892 by the Episcopal Diocese of Iowa. It is listed on the National Register of Historic Places.
41	J. Monroe Parker-Ficke House		June 4, 2003	1208 Main St. 41°31′55″N 90°34′33″W	Central	Second Empire style mansion built in 1881 by financier J. Monroe Parker. It was also home for Davenport attorney and mayor C.A. Ficke. It is a contributing property in the College Square Historic District.
42	J.H.C. Petersen and Sons Building		November 7, 2001	131 W. 2nd St. 41°31′16″N 90°34′31″W	Downtown	Former department store building built in the Romanesque Revival style in 1892 and designed by Fredrick G. Clausen. The structure continues to serve as a commercial building and is listed on the National Register of Historic Places.
43	W.D. Petersen Memorial Music Pavilion		June 2, 1993	LeClaire Park; 41°31′7″N 90°34′46″W	Downtown	The Mission/Spanish Revival style structure was designed by Rudolph J. Clausen and built on the riverfront in 1924. It is listed on the National Register of Historic Places.
44	Peterson Bag and Paper		November 15, 2015	301 E. 2nd St. 41°31′16″N 90°34′15″W	Downtown	The Chicago School-style building served both manufacturing and warehouse purposes. The structure was converted into an apartment building.
45	Prospect Park		August 4, 1993	Prospect Dr. 41°31′44″N 90°33′7″W	East	Prospect Park hill, which overlooks the Mississippi River, is the listed on the local register. The larger Prospect Park area is a historic district listed on National Register of Historic Places.
46	Charles F. Ranzow and Sons Building		November 15, 2000	532 W. 3rd St. 41°31′21″N 90°36′37″W	Downtown	A commercial building built in two parts in the late 19th century and early 20th century. It is a contributing property in the West Third Street Historic District on the National Register of Historic Places.
47	Renwick Building		February 2, 2000	324 Brady St. 41°31′24″N 90°34′27″W	Downtown	Chicago Commercial Style building built in 1897. It is listed on the National Register of Historic Places.
48	Riverview—Abner Davison Homestead		June 10, 1997	1234 E. River Dr. 41°31′40″N 90°33′25″W	East	The Italianate/Prairie style home was built in 1910 for Davenport attorney Abner Davison. It now serves as the location for Gilda's Club of the Quad Cities, and it is listed on the National Register of Historic Places.
49	Riverview Terrace		August 4, 1993	Clay St. 41°31′49″N 90°35′43″W	West	A three-acre park on a bluff overlooking the Mississippi River.
50	Saengerfest Halle		August 5, 1998	1012 W. 3rd St. 41°31′25″N 90°35′16″W	West	Built in 1914 to replace the original Saengerfest Halle that was built for a German music festival held in 1898. The present building known as the Coliseum, or The Col, has been a popular entertainment and dance venue. It is listed on the National Register of Historic Places.
51	St. Anthony's Church Square		October 7, 1992	407-417 Main St. 41°31′26″N 90°34′31″W	Downtown	St. Anthony's was the first Christian congregation to organize in Davenport in 1837. The original church, completed in 1838, is still standing behind the present Greek Revival church, whose front section was completed in 1853. It is listed on the National Register of Historic Places.
52	St. Joseph's Church & Rectory		September 1, 1999	605-615 Marquette St. 41°31′33″N 90°35′24″W	West	The parish was founded in 1855 as St. Kunigunda to serve the city's German community. The cornerstone for the present church was laid in 1881 when the parish name was changed to St. Joseph. The buildings currently house a Christian ministry for those on the margins named One Eighty. The church is listed on the National Register of Historic Places.
53	Schuetzen Park Street Car Pavilion		August 5, 1998	700 Waverly Rd. 41°31′28″N 90°37′24″W	West	The street car pavilion served Schuetzen Park, a popular park founded by the German Schuetzengesellschaft.
54	Soldier's Monument		June 2, 1993	1100 Main St. 41°31′53″N 90°34′32.5″W	Central	The monument was built in 1880 to honor Scott County's Civil War dead. It is a contributing property on the College Square Historic District listed on the National Register of Historic Places.
55	Dr. Kuno Struck House		August 7, 1996	1645 W. 12th St. 41°36′0″N 90°20′37″W	West	Tudor Revival residence designed by Clausen & Kruse in 1911. It is listed on the National Register of Historic Places.
56	Taylor School		September 13, 2005	1400 Warren St. 41°32′5″N 90°35′10″W	West	Former school building designed in the Colonial Revival style by the Davenport architectural firm of Clausen & Burrows. It is listed on the National Register of Historic Places.
57	Vander Veer Park		August 4, 1993	Bounded by Brady, Harrison and Lombard Sts. and W. Central Park Ave. 41°32′35″N 90°34′28″W	Central	Established as Central Park on the former fair grounds. The botanical park is a contributing property in the Vander Veer Park Historic District on the National Register of Historic Places.
58	Annie Wittenmyer Complex		May 15, 1996	2800 Eastern Ave. 41°32′48.9″N 90°33′9.7″W	East	Orphanage founded by Annie Wittenmyer on the site of a former Union Army camp, Camp Kinsman, after the American Civil War. The complex now houses non-profit organizations. It is listed on the National Register of Historic Places.
59	Woeber Carriage Works		November 15, 2000	312 W. 3rd St. 41°31′21″N 90°34′40″W	Downtown	The Italianate building on the street was built in 1881 and the stone building behind from 1857. It is a contributing property in the Davenport Downtown Commercial Historic District.

== See also ==
- National Register of Historic Places listings in Davenport, Iowa
