= E. P. Adler House =

Historic house in Iowa, United States

- E.P. Adler House
- U.S. National Register of Historic Places
- U.S. Historic district – Contributing property
- Davenport Register of Historic Properties
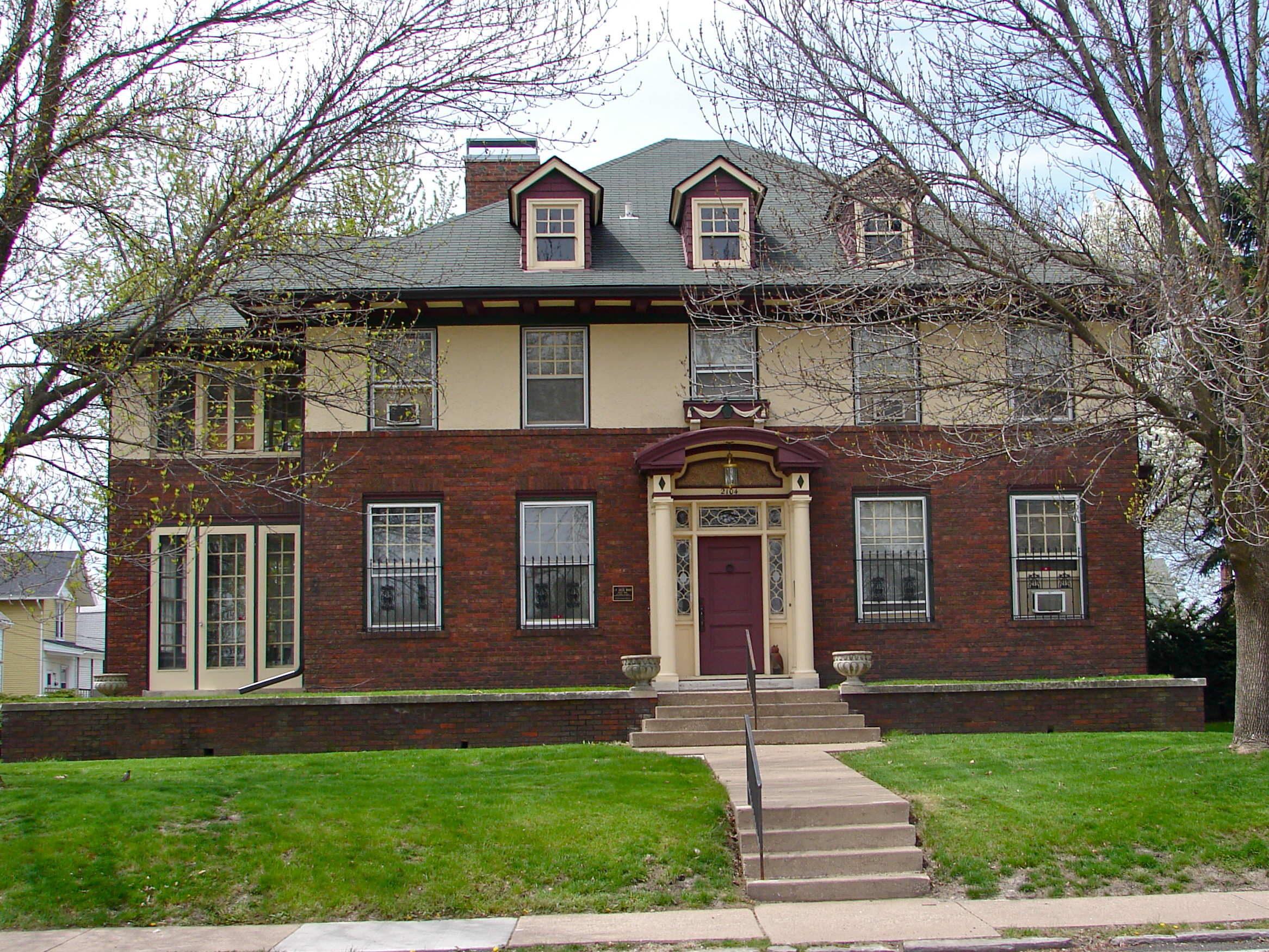

- Location within Iowa Location within the United States
- Location: 2104 Main St. Davenport, Iowa
- Coordinates: 41.5408574°N 90.5758572°W
- Area: less than one acre
- Built: c.1910
- Architectural style: Colonial Revival, Late 19th and Early 20th Century American Movements
- Part of: Vander Veer Park Historic District (ID85000784)
- MPS: Davenport MRA
- NRHP reference No.: 83002394
- DRHP No.: 49

Significant dates
- Added to NRHP: July 7, 1983
- Designated DRHP: July 7, 2008

The E.P. Adler House is a historic building located in the central part of Davenport, Iowa, United States. It has been individually listed on the National Register of Historic Places since 1983. In 1984 it was included as a contributing property in the Vander Veer Park Historic District. It has been on the Davenport Register of Historic Properties since 2008.

== E.P. Adler ==
Emmanuel P. Adler became a printer's apprentice at the age of 13. He was working in the mechanical department of the Ottumwa Courier when he was discovered by the paper's publisher A.W. Lee. Adler became a reporter for the Courier and was then sent to Davenport as the business manager of the Davenport Times. When Lee died in 1907, Adler took over as president of the Lee Syndicate, now known as Lee Enterprises, and held the position for more than 40 years. Under Adler's guidance the company grew to include newspapers, radio and television stations.

After the Bank Holiday in 1933 Adler was instrumental in reopening American Commercial and Savings Bank as Davenport Bank and Trust. By 1936 the bank had grown to become the second largest bank in Iowa.

== Architecture ==
The E.P. Adler House is located set back from Main Street on a low terraced lot, just south of Vander Veer Park. It exhibits a mixture of the Colonial Revival and Prairie School architectural styles. The Colonial Revival features includes its symmetrical five-bay main façade, a hipped roof with dormers, and a main entrance that is framed by sidelights and a transom above. The entrance is also surrounded by a shallow curved pediment with engaged columns. The Prairie style is represented by wide eaves with stylized projecting rafter ends and the combination of brick and stucco surface materials.
