= Soldier's Monument (Davenport, Iowa) =

- U.S. Historic district – Contributing property
- Davenport Register of Historic Properties
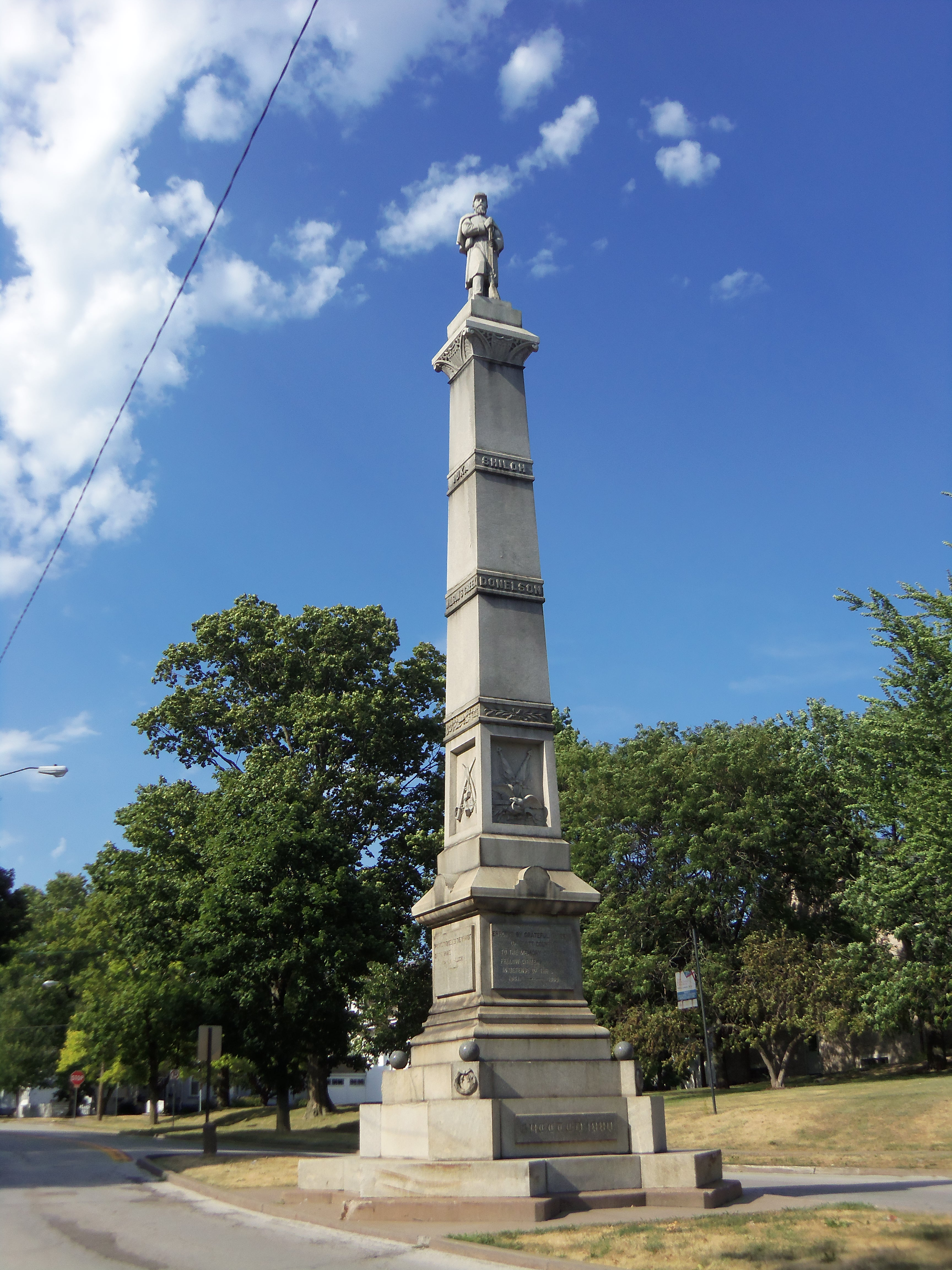

- Location within Iowa Location within the United States
- Location: 1100 Main St. Davenport, Iowa
- Coordinates: 41°31′53″N 90°34′32.5″W
- Area: less than one acre
- Built: 1880-1881
- Architect: R.J. Carver
- Part of: College Square Historic District (ID83003628)
- MPS: Davenport MRA
- DRHP No.: 11

Significant dates
- Added to NRHP: November 18, 1983
- Designated DRHP: June 2, 1993

The Soldier's Monument is a historic structure in the College Square Historic District in Davenport, Iowa, United States. The district was added to the National Register of Historic Places in 1983. The monument, which was built from 1880 to 1881, was individually listed on the Davenport Register of Historic Properties in 1993.

== History ==
A movement to erect a monument began in 1865 when an association was created to establish a monument to President Abraham Lincoln after his assassination. The Lincoln Monument Association of Scott County, Iowa was incorporated on May 25, 1865. After six years the association collected $529.25, with the accumulated interest of $148.50, the total amount they had for the monument amounted to $707.40. Nicholas Fejervary offered to donate $1,300 if the monument would be erected to Scott County's Civil War dead instead. After accepting the offer, donations to the monument fund increased.

The association hired R.J. Carver of South Rydate, Vermont to design the monument. The monument association approved the design on June 5, 1880. A site was chosen in the middle of Main Street between Grace Cathedral, now Trinity Cathedral, and Griswold College, now the campus of Davenport Central High School. The monument was built for $8,000. It was constructed 1880-1881 and dedicated on July 4, 1881. The monument was given to the city of Davenport on January 15, 1906. At one time patriotic exercises were held at the monument each Memorial Day by the local Grand Army of the Republic post, the Loyal Legion, the Sons of Veterans, the Woman's Relief Corps and other patriotic organizations.

== Architecture ==
The monument is an obelisk of English Granite that rises 50 feet (15 m). It is topped by a statue of a Union soldier, which faces south towards the Mississippi River in the valley below. He measures 8 feet (2.4 m) tall. The base for the monument is 17.5 feet (5.3 m) square, with buttress extensions at the corners. The monument's foundation is at least 7 feet (2.1 m) in the ground and is composed of Nauvoo stone and it rests on a cement floor.

There are four panels with inscriptions on each side of the monument. The south panel reads: "Erected by Grateful Citizens of Scott County In Memory of the Fellow Citizens who Died in Defense of the Union 1861-5". The west panel bears a quote from General H. W. Halleck: "Proved themselves the Bravest of the Brave". The panel on the north bears a quote taken from Lincoln's Gettysburg Address: "They died, that the government of the People, by the People and for the People might not perish from the Earth." The east panel's quote is from Inspector General W. E. Strong: "An Honor to their Friends at Home, to their State and their Country * * * a Terror to their Foes."

The lower section of the shaft features bas reliefs of the following emblems: the coat of arms of the United States (south); heavy crossed sabers, belt, cartridges and revolvers, which represent the cavalry (west); crossed cannon, which represent the artillery (north); and an anchor and shot, which represent the navy (east). On the first plinth above the lower section of the column, are emblematic wreaths. Over the U.S. coat of arms is the laurel-representing joy; over the cavalry symbols, the ivy-representing lasting remembrance; over the artillery symbols, the oak-representing strength; and over the naval symbols, the olive-representing peace. The two plinths above the second and third sections of the column have the names of the battles in which local soldiers fought engraved on each side of the column. The battles listed are: Shilo, Donelson, Iuka, Wilsons Creek, Fort Blakeley, Corinth, Prairie Grove and Vicksburg.

The capstone at the top of the column features a shield and carving on each side. Above the capstone is a pedestal for the statue of a soldier who represents the infantry. At one time the monument was surrounded by an iron fence.
