= Woeber Carriage Works =

- U.S. Historic district – Contributing property
- Davenport Register of Historic Properties
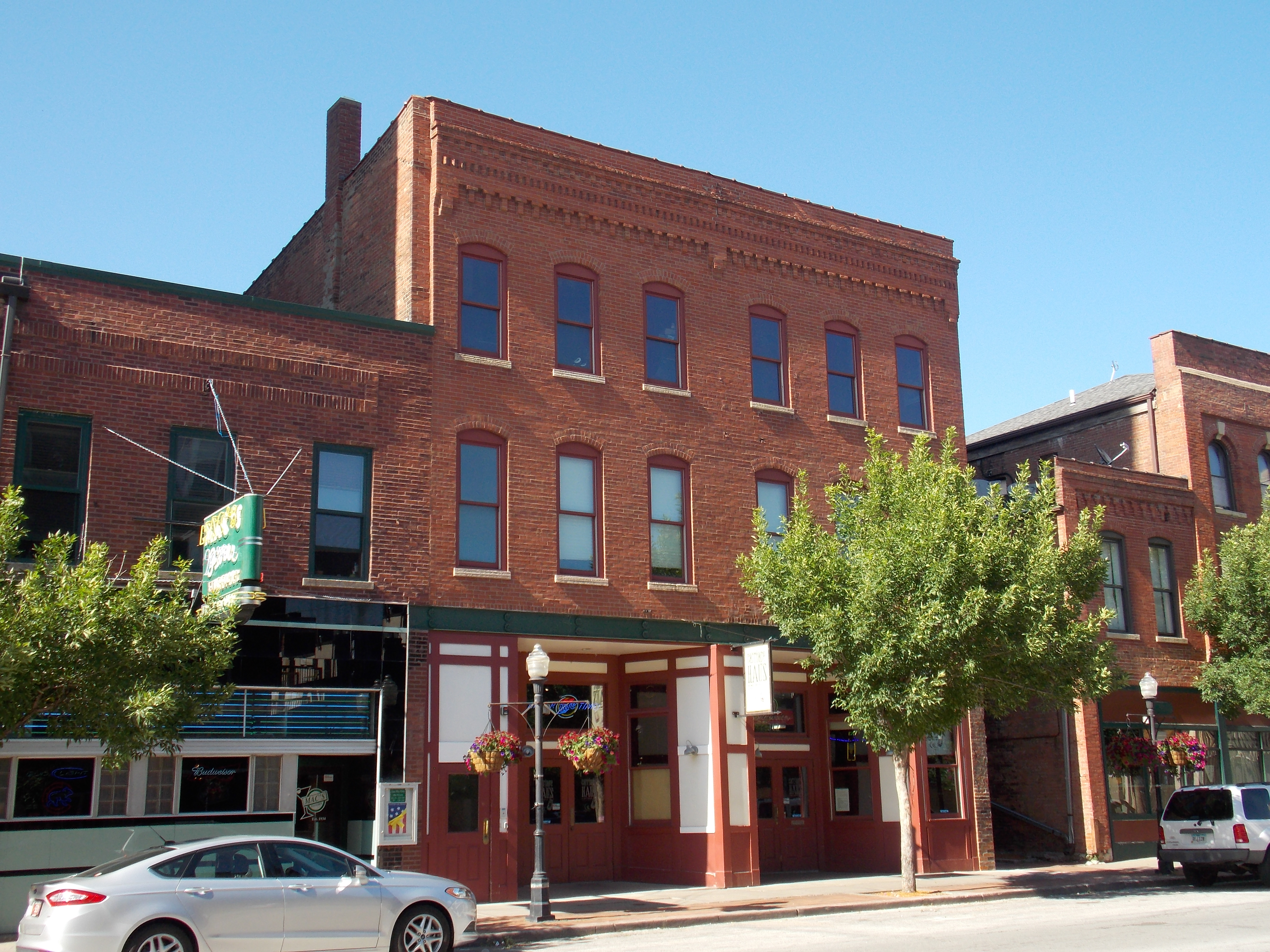

- Location within Iowa Location within the United States
- Location: 312 W. 3rd St. Davenport, Iowa
- Coordinates: 41°32′2.8″N 90°33′23″W
- Built: 1857 (rear), 1881
- Architect: John C. Cochrane
- Architectural style: Italianate
- Part of: Davenport Downtown Commercial Historic District (ID100005546)
- DRHP No.: 35

Significant dates
- Added to NRHP: September 11, 2020
- Designated DRHP: November 15, 2000

Woeber Carriage Works, also known as the G. Hager & Co. Carriage Works and the Davenport Plow Works, is a historic building located on Lot 3, Block 20 of the original town of Davenport, Iowa, United States. It was listed on the Davenport Register of Historic Properties on November 15, 2000. In 2020 it was included as a contributing property in the Davenport Downtown Commercial Historic District on the National Register of Historic Places.

== History ==
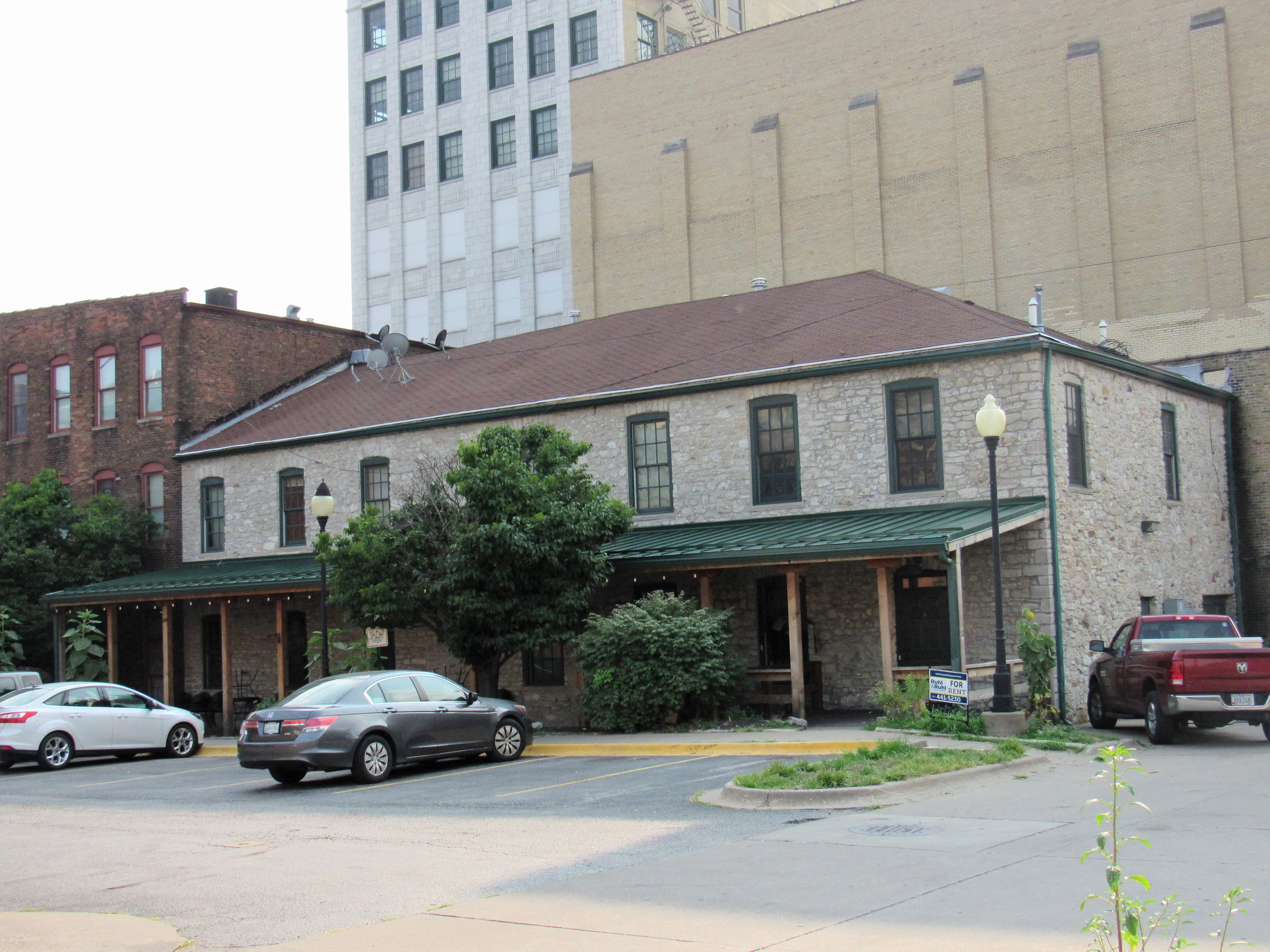
The stone building in the back.

The building was built in 1881 for the Davenport Plow Works. The property was formerly the location for First Presbyterian Church. The Classified Business Directory of August 1881 indicates the company was located at 310-324 W. 3rd Street. The 1886 Sanborn Fire Insurance map indicates that the building at 312 W. Third Street housed a machine shop, "setting up" and storage on all three floors of the front section. The stone structure attached to the rear of the building, built in 1857, housed polishing and grinding on the first floor and storage on the second floor. The rest of the Davenport Plow Works was in the building immediately to the west.

After the plow works failed, Davenport attorney and real estate investor C.A. Ficke bought the building in 1889 and renovated it to lease to tenants. Various businesses have occupied the building. Peter A. Reimers and James Larkin occupied the building from 1898 to 1910, with P.A. Reimers, who manufactured cornices, skylights, slate, and metal roofs, occupying it for a further year. The Benner Tea Co. (1915–1918), Federal System of Bakeries (1920), the Chicago Butchers Market Co. (1925), Safe-Way Markets (1930), and Atlas Cigar (1940) all occupied the building. A nightclub by the name of the Carriage Haus now occupies the building.

== Architecture ==
The building is three stories and constructed of brick in a restrained Italianate style. Its foundation is likely constructed of stone. There is a two-story structure attached to the rear. The brick portion of the building is rectangular in shape with a flat roof. The façade is divided into three parts: the storefront, the upper wall, and the cornice. The building retains its original dual entrances, which were not always recessed, and the exposed steel beam that separates the storefront from the top two stories. The windows on the upper floors are organized in two sets of three on both floors. It emphasizes the two sides of the building. Each window features a segmentally arched header and a stone sill. The cornice is composed of patterned brickwork.

The stone structure in the back is a rectangular vernacular structure that features a hipped roof. The double-hung windows are the dominant feature of the structure.

== Company ==
The Woeber Brothers Carriage Works was formed when Adam Woeber acquired his brothers' Davenport-based wagon manufacturing firm in 1872, which had been operating since the 1850s. The company specialized in building commercial wagons as well as other vehicles and heavy equipment.
