= LeClaire Park Bandshell =

- W.D. Petersen Memorial; Music Pavilion
- U.S. National Register of Historic Places
- Davenport Register of Historic Properties
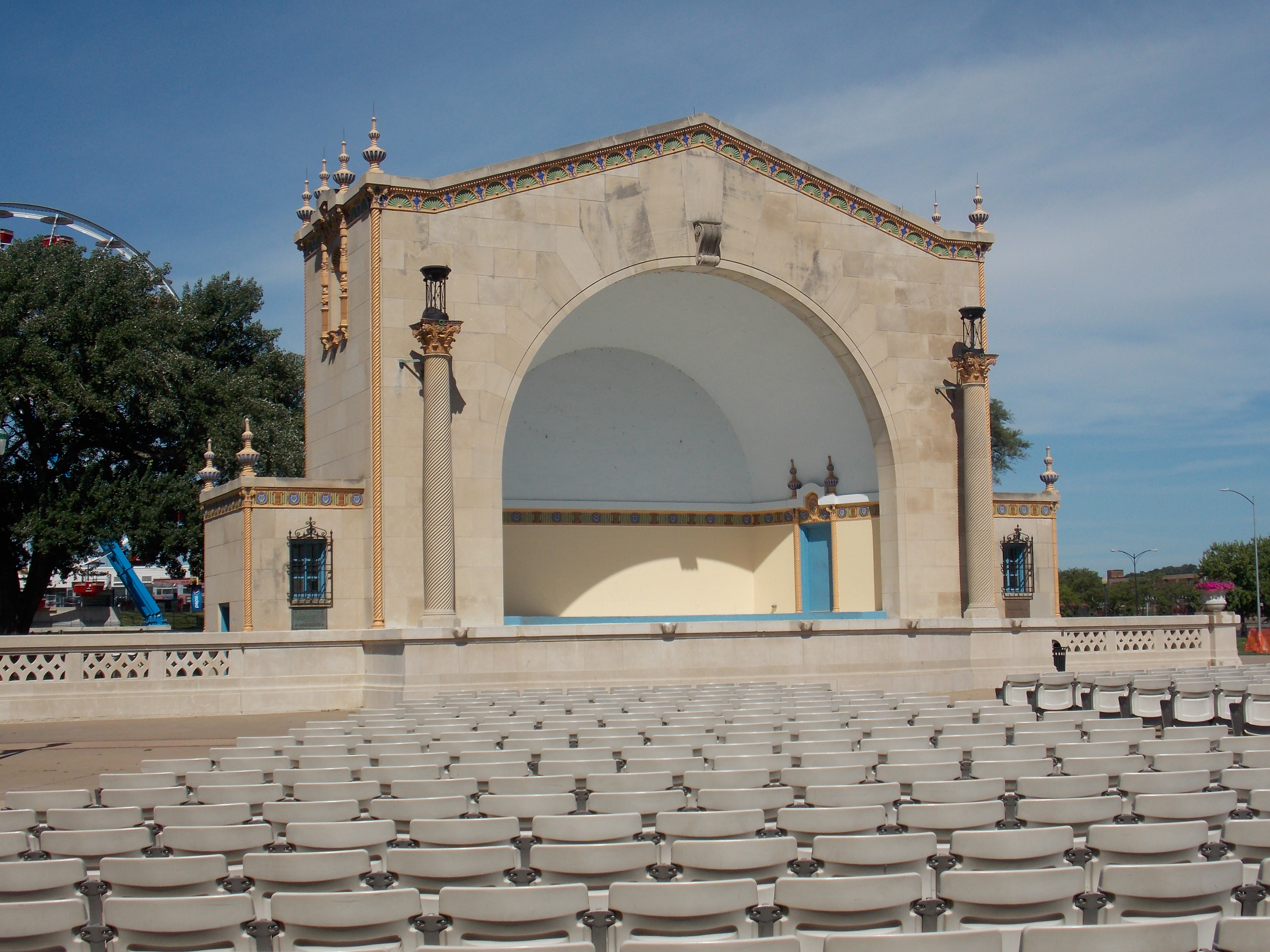

- Location within Iowa Location within the United States
- Location: Beiderbecke Drive (LeClaire Park); Davenport, Iowa
- Coordinates: 41°31′08″N 90°34′47″W
- Built: 1924
- Architect: Rudolph J. Clausen
- Architectural style: Mission/Spanish Revival
- MPS: Davenport MRA
- NRHP reference No.: 83002485
- DRHP No.: 9

Significant dates
- Added to NRHP: July 7, 1983
- Designated DRHP: June 2, 1993

The LeClaire Park Bandshell, also known as the W.D. Petersen Memorial Music Pavilion, is located on Beiderbecke Drive in LeClaire Park, Davenport, Iowa. It was listed on the National Register of Historic Places in 1983 and on the Davenport Register of Historic Properties in 1993.

== History ==
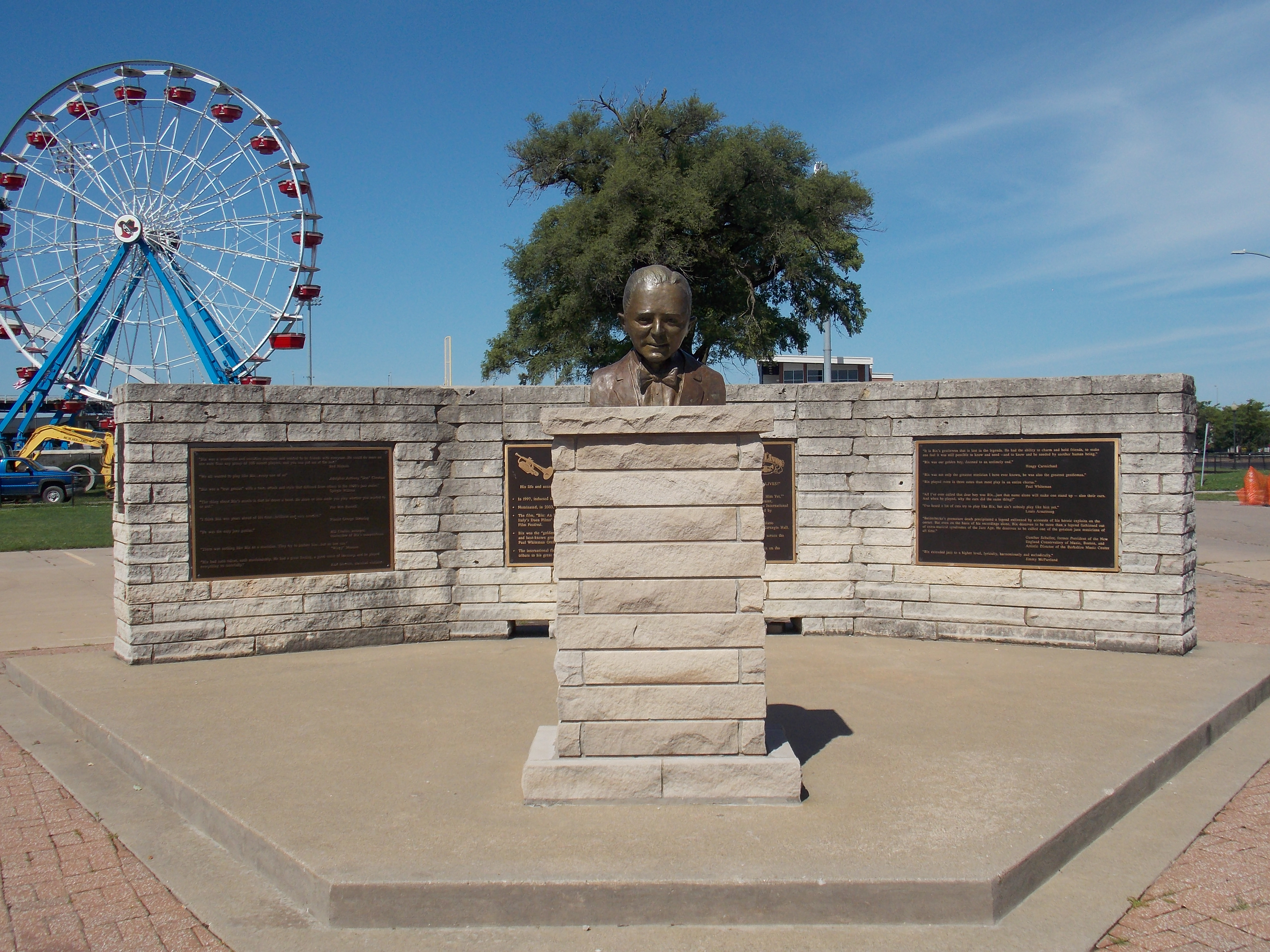
Bix Beiderbecke Memorial

Starting in 1911 the city of Davenport started two decades of improvement to the riverfront under the leadership of Alfred Mueller, who was the mayor, and William D. Petersen. The Levee Improvement Commission, which is responsible for developing the city's riverfront, was started the same year. LeClaire Park was extensively improved by the commission between the years 1912 and 1914. Their aim was to maintain a riverfront that balanced commercial, industrial and recreational uses. The music pavilion, named for Petersen, was part of their beautification efforts and built in 1924. Because Davenport had a large and musically inclined German population, the city had band shells located in Fejervary, Vander Veer, and Schuetzen parks as well. This is the only one that remains. Its dedication in 1924 makes this structure, along with the East Park Band Shell in Mason City built the same year, the two oldest band shells in Iowa.

The music pavilion continues to host various public events throughout the year. The Bix Beiderbecke Memorial Jazz Festival, Mississippi Valley Blues Festival and the Quad City Symphony Orchestra’s Riverfront Pops Concert are annual events. President George W. Bush spoke from the pavilion when he ran for reelection in 2004, as did Senator Barack Obama in 2007 when he ran for the presidency before the 2008 Iowa Caucuses.

== Architecture ==
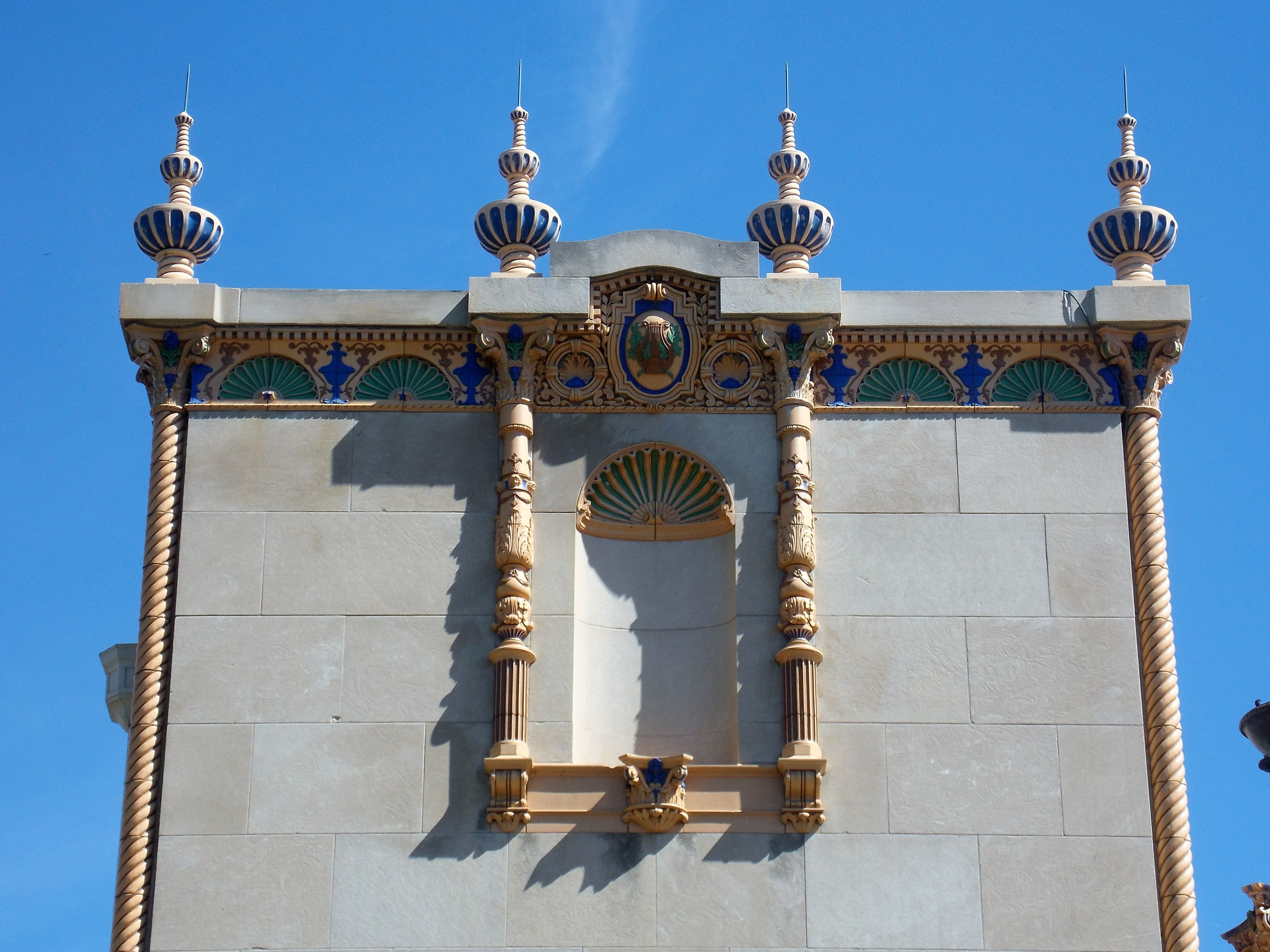
Finials at the cornice

The pavilion was designed by Rudolph Clausen from the architectural firm of Clausen & Kruse. The firm also designed other historic buildings in Davenport including the Democrat Building, the Forrest Block, Scott County Savings Bank, The Linograph Company Building, and the Davenport Municipal Stadium (now known as Modern Woodmen Park). The music pavilion is located just to the east of the stadium along the riverfront. The inspiration for the pavilion was Harrison Albright's Spreckels Organ Pavilion (1915) that was built for the Panama–California Exposition at Balboa Park in San Diego. While less decorative, it follows the same basic form and massing as the Spreckels, with flame finials, and a concentration of Baroque detail at the cornice and side openings. They differ in that the proscenium arch and the side pavilions are simpler in design.

The music pavilion is a concrete structure built on a raised stone podium. It is rectangular in shape with a peaked roof which levels out to the north and south walls. The structure features distinctive ornamental details, Corinthian columns with twisted-rope shafts, minaret-shaped pinnacles, iron-grated windows, and side niches. There is complex decorative pattern work at the roofline. Many of the decorative details are finished in bold colors of blue, green, and gold, which contrast with the neutral color of the stone. The pavilion's facade faces to the east where an outdoor seating area, set on a concrete slab, is located. To the north of the pavilion is the bust of Davenport native Bix Beiderbecke, a prominent jazz musician in the 20th century.
