= Collins House (Davenport, Iowa) =

Historic house in Iowa, United States

- U.S. National Register of Historic Places
- Davenport Register of Historic Properties
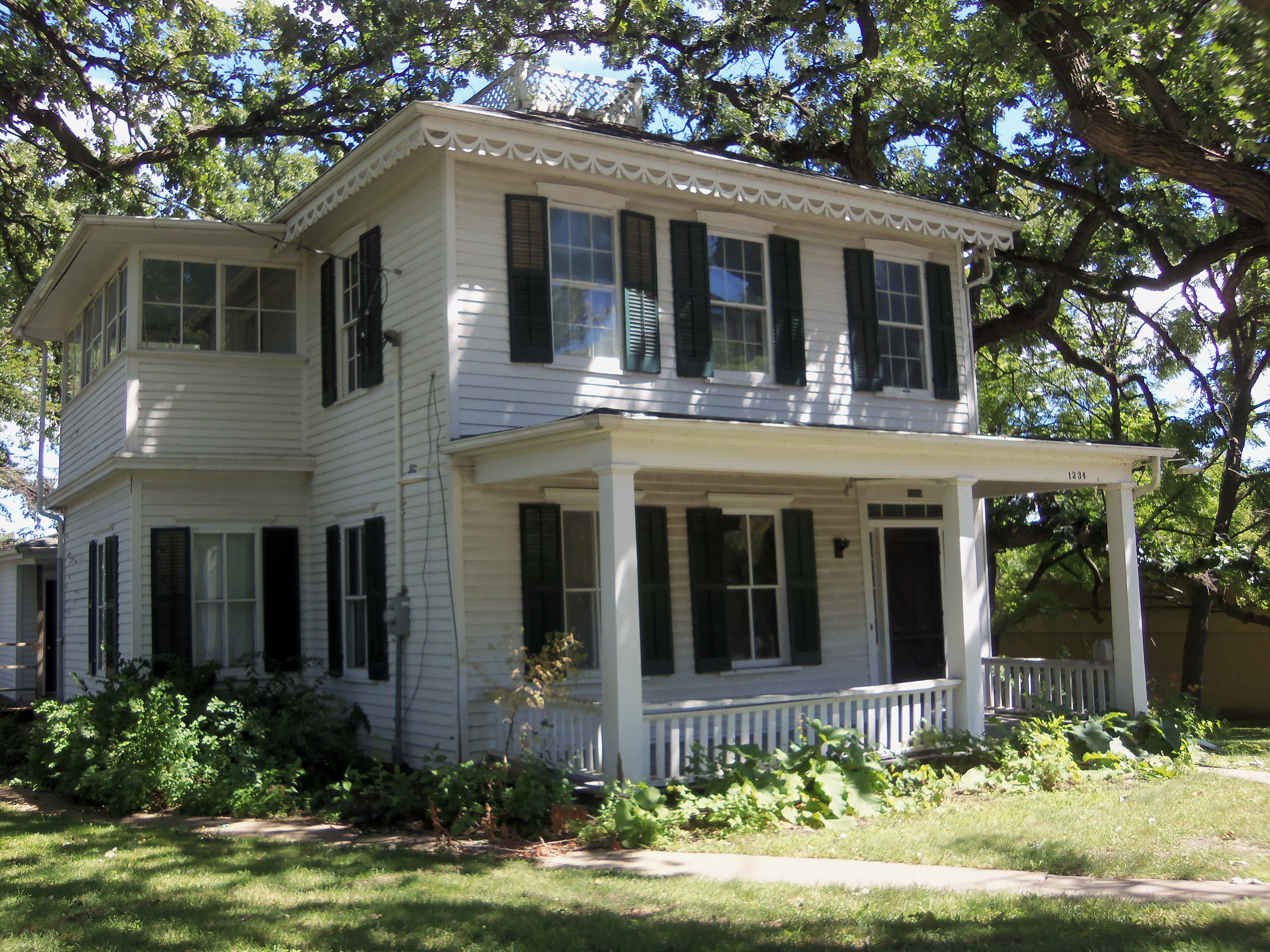

- Location within Iowa Location within the United States
- Location: 1234 E. 29th St. Davenport, Iowa
- Coordinates: 41°32′58″N 90°33′26″W
- Built: 1860
- Architectural style: Classical Revival
- NRHP reference No.: 76000808
- DRHP No.: 13

Significant dates
- Added to NRHP: October 8, 1976
- Designated DRHP: June 2, 1993

The Collins House is a historic building located on the eastside of Davenport, Iowa, United States. It has been listed on the National Register of Historic Places since 1976, and on the Davenport Register of Historic Properties since 1993. Built as a farmhouse in 1860 the city of Davenport purchased the property and renovated it for a senior center in the mid-1970s.

== History ==
Miles Augustus Collins was born in Albany, New York, on September 1, 1832. When he was four years old his family moved to a farm near Blandford, Massachusetts, where he was raised. He remained there until 1854 when he moved to Scott County, Iowa, where he joined his father as a carpenter. After a year he started farming and started the first cheese factory in the county. They were also among the first cheesemakers in the state of Iowa. He owned several farms and became quite adept at real estate. He moved to his final farm in 1860. On June 15, 1870, he married Amy Wilson, who was a widow. Together they raised six children. He died in his home on June 5, 1908.

The Collins family continued to own the house until 1963, when it was sold to the Davenport Park Board for their use. They had a stipulation that the remaining sisters could live in the house rent free until their deaths. Beginning in 1977 the Davenport Parks and Recreation Department in a joint venture with the Center for Active Seniors, Inc. (CASI) used the house as a senior center. Over the years it has also housed a senior activity center, a place with recreational programming for special needs people, and as a summer youth activities center.

On May 2, 2015, the house opened as the Southeast Iowa Senior Information Hub, a resource center for senior citizens and their families. Information that the center provides includes "health care, Social Security, transportation, finances and senior housing that ranges from private to assisted living." They also provide monthly programs centered on the concerns of seniors. The Davenport Parks and Recreation Department, volunteers and in-kind donations from local businesses renovated the house and brought it up to the standards required by the Americans with Disabilities Act.

== Architecture ==
The house was originally a three-bay, square structure. Several additions were made to the structure over the years. The pantry, kitchen, and dining room were added to the back of the house in 1870. The full porch was added to the front of the house in 1908, and the sleeping porch was added to the west side in 1916. The two-story frame structure is essentially Classical Revival in style. It features Greek Revival derivative window hoods and a latticework belvedere on top of the hipped roof. The house is situated on the edge of Garfield Park along the Duck Creek Parkway. A handicap ramp and a new porch were added to the rear of the house when it was renovated into a senior resource center.
