= Abner Davison House =

Historic house in Iowa, United States

- U.S. National Register of Historic Places
- Davenport Register of Historic Properties
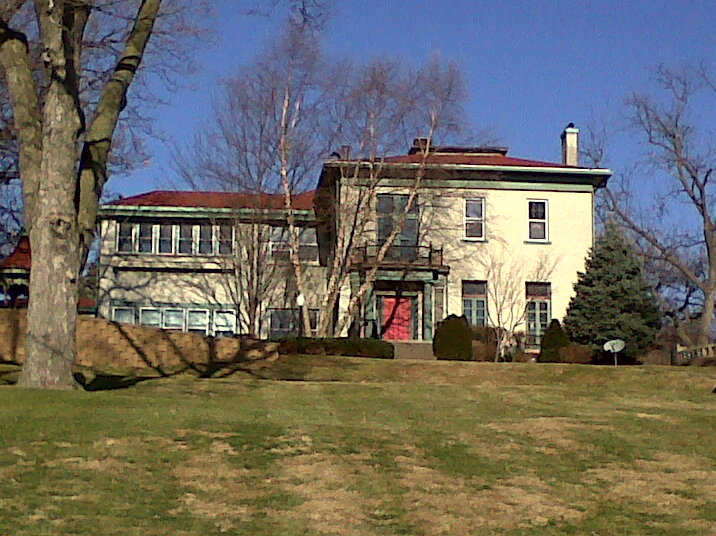

- Location within Iowa Location within the United States
- Location: 1234 River Dr. Davenport, Iowa
- Coordinates: 41°31′40″N 90°33′25″W
- Area: 2 acres (0.81 ha)
- Built: 1912
- Architectural style: Italianate; Prairie School
- MPS: Davenport MRA
- NRHP reference No.: 84001341
- DRHP No.: 21

Significant dates
- Added to NRHP: July 27, 1984
- Designated DRHP: June 10, 1997

The Abner Davison House, also known as Riverview, is one of several mansions that overlook the Mississippi River on the east side of Davenport, Iowa, United States. It has been listed on the National Register of Historic Places since 1984, and on the Davenport Register of Historic Properties since 1997.

== History ==
Abner Davison was a Davenport attorney who had the original section of this house built in the mid-1850s next to that of Ambrose Fulton. At the time the house was built Davison was a law partner with David S. True. By the 1890s, he was in a partnership with Joe R. Lane. Charles Crowe acquired the house after the Davisons died. He hired the prominent Davenport architectural firm of Temple & Burrows to design the large addition on the west side of the house in 1912. Charles A. Ruhl, noteworthy for his family's local insurance and real estate business, bought the houses in 1934. In the last 15 years of his family's ownership, the house was rented to different tenants.

Two couples bought the house and between 1986 and 1997 Davison house was the River Oaks Inn Bed and Breakfast. In 2007 the house was deeded to Gilda's Club of the Quad Cities. The organization decided in 2020 that their resources were better spent on establishing programs at the local hospitals instead of maintaining the house. They sold the building that year to a new owner who intends to convert it back to a private residence.

== Architecture ==
The house was built in two different phases and it marries two different styles. The original house was built in the Tuscan form of the Italianate style in the late 1850s or early 1860s. This was the popular style employed by Davenport's wealthier citizens for their homes in this era. This section of the house is the cube-shaped structure on the east side. The two-story wing on the west side was added in the early 20th-century. While it shares some features with the original house, such as the hipped roof, its windows are organized in horizontal bands, which are typical of the Prairie School. Both sections are brought together with the stucco exterior. There was possibly a cupola on top of the original house that was removed as were the brackets from under the eaves. The columned porch is the only decorative element that remains.
