= Iowa Reform Building =

- U.S. National Register of Historic Places
- Davenport Register of Historic Properties
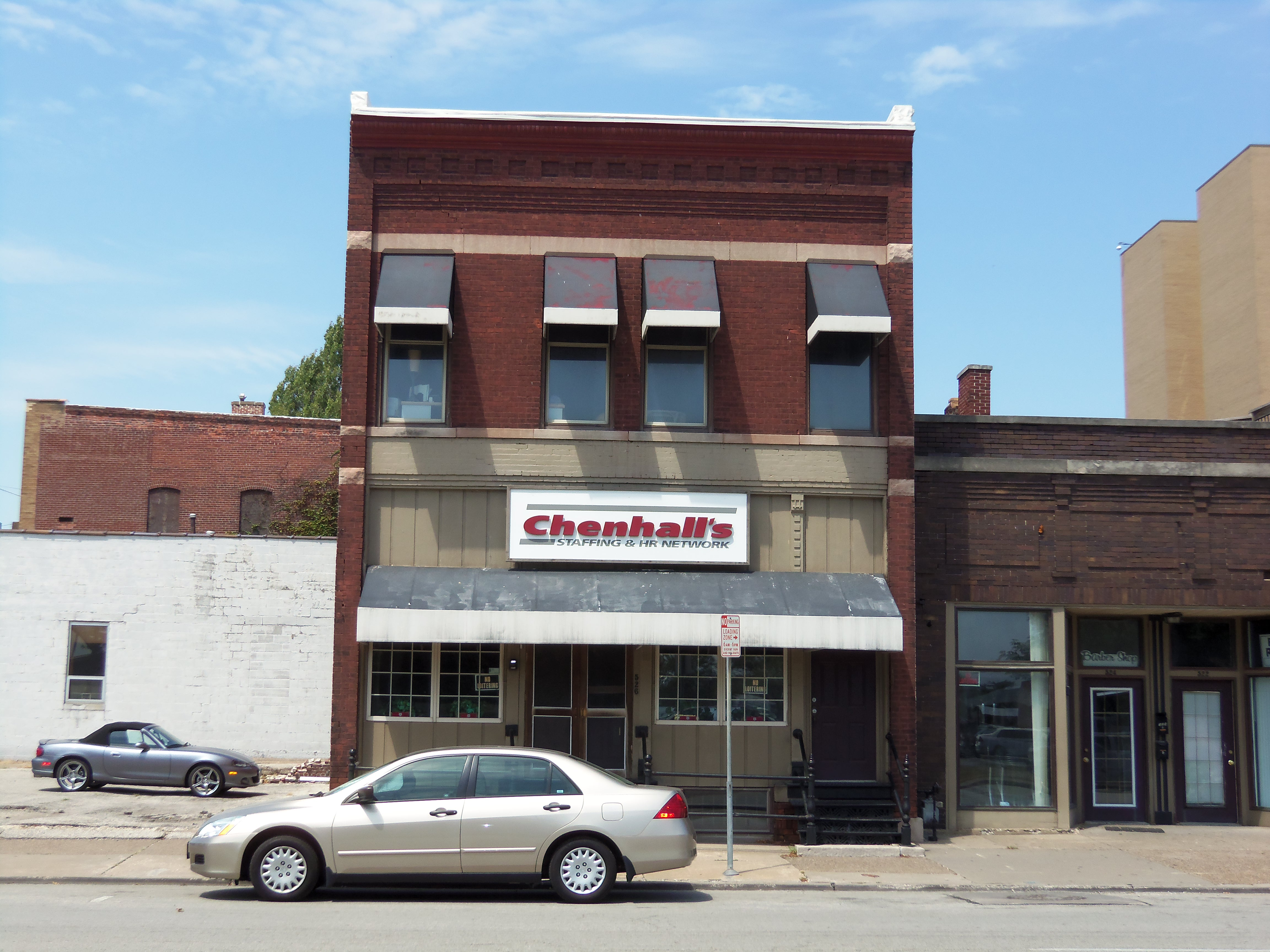

- Location within Iowa Location within the United States
- Location: 526 W. 2nd St. Davenport, Iowa
- Coordinates: 41°31′17″N 90°34′52″W
- Area: less than one acre
- Built: 1892
- MPS: Davenport MRA
- NRHP reference No.: 83003658
- DRHP No.: 39

Significant dates
- Added to NRHP: November 18, 1983
- Designated DRHP: January 16, 2002

Iowa Reform Building is a historic building located in downtown Davenport, Iowa, United States. It was listed on the National Register of Historic Places in 1983 and on the Davenport Register of Historic Properties in 2002.

== History ==
Adolph Petersen founded The Iowa Reform, a newspaper that first appeared in Davenport in 1884. Members of the Petersen family were the publishers and editors of the paper from its inception until it ceased publication. They included Adolph and his brother Gerhard, and they were followed by Robert Petersen. Adolph Petersen lived in the apartment above the shop. The paper initially carried a strong Democratic point of view, but eventually went independent. It was a semi-weekly publication that served the German community of the Tri-City area, which is now known as the Quad Cities. The Reform's peak circulation was 4,000 in 1912. Unlike other German publications, it survived the anti-German sentiments that resulted from World War I. By 1939 it was the only German-language paper left in Iowa, and it had a circulation of 3,240. However, it could not survive those same sentiments that resulted from World War II and the paper folded in 1943.

The building itself was built for the Iowa Reform in the heart of the German commercial district on the west side of downtown Davenport. The building has housed various commercial enterprises since the newspaper folded.

== Architecture ==
The Iowa Reform Building is a two-story structure that is built of brick on a stone foundation. Its English basement is a unique feature. The workrooms and press rooms for the newspaper were located here and the large windows allowed natural light and ventilation to the basement. The storefront features cast-iron columns and two entrances that are accessed by iron steps and handrails. All are believed to be original to the building. The widows of the storefront were altered in a 1998 renovation. The buildings second floor is defined by the placement of stone banding above and below the windows. Above the top banding is the building's cornice. The bottom part of the cornice is built of brick and it is topped by a molded metal cornice that features an egg and dart pattern.
