= John Littig House =

Historic house in Iowa, United States

- U.S. National Register of Historic Places
- Davenport Register of Historic Properties
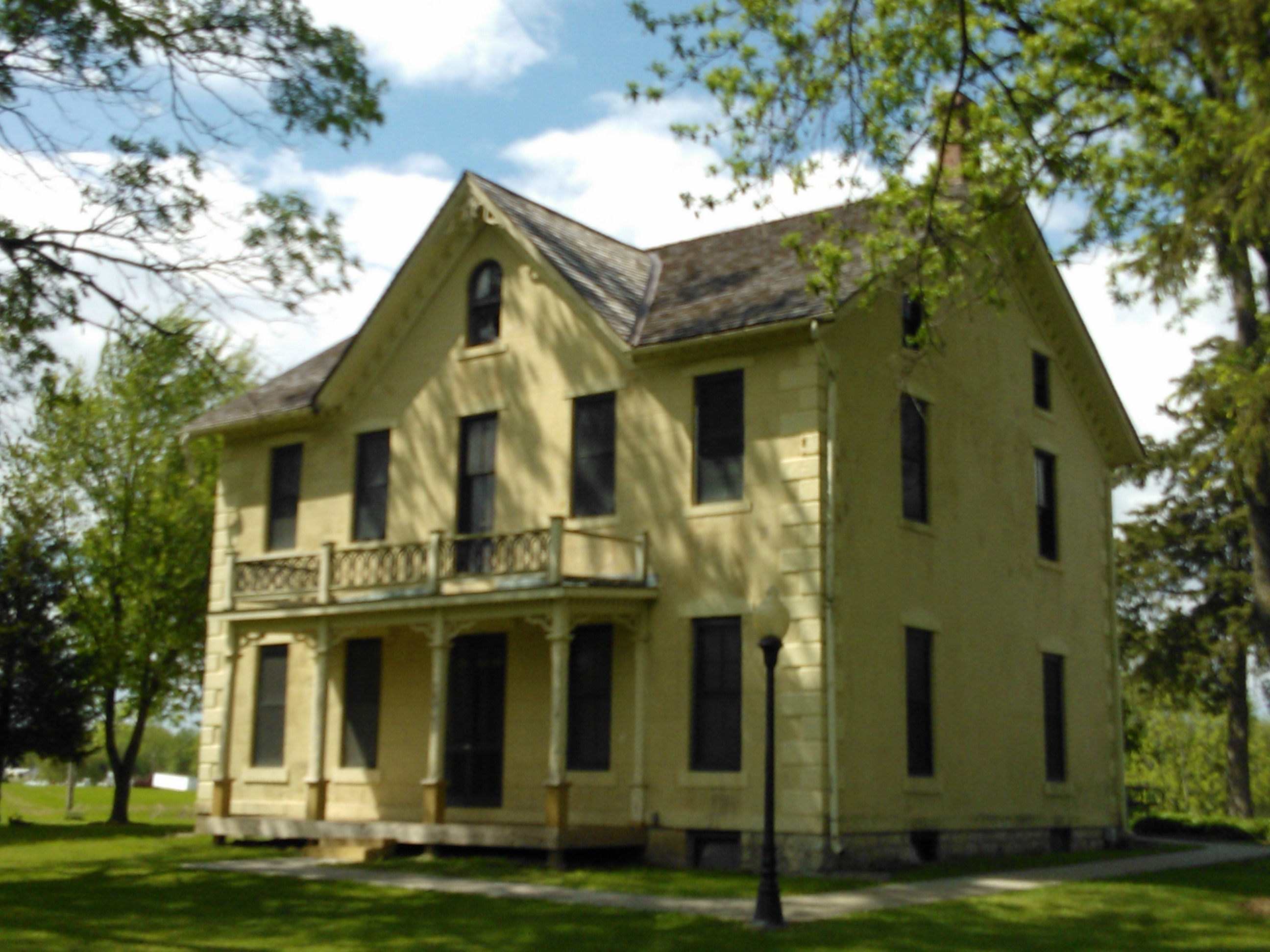

- Location within Iowa Location within the United States
- Location: 6035 Northwest Blvd. Davenport, Iowa
- Coordinates: 41°34′29″N 90°35′51″W
- Area: 2-acre (0.81 ha)
- Built: 1867
- Architectural style: Gothic Revival
- MPS: Davenport MRA
- NRHP reference No.: 84000310
- DRHP No.: 8

Significant dates
- Added to NRHP: November 1, 1984
- Designated DRHP: June 2, 1993

The John Littig House is a historic building located on the northwest side of Davenport, Iowa, United States. The Gothic Revival style residence was built in 1867 and has been listed on the National Register of Historic Places since 1984 and on the Davenport Register of Historic Properties since 1993.

== History ==
This stone farmhouse was built by John Littig, a French immigrant who served as the carriage driver for Antoine LeClaire, one of the founders and an early promoter of the city of Davenport. He had previously worked for Harvey Leonard who was a local contractor and brick manufacturer. This was the third farm that Littig owned in Scott County, Iowa. It grew to become the largest farm in the county and was known as a show place. The family was noted for their hospitality and their locally produced wines. The City of Davenport bought and renovated the house in the mid-1970s. It serves as a meeting place for qualified organizations.

== Architecture ==
The Gothic Revival style was used extensively in church architecture in Davenport, but sparingly in domestic architecture. The Littig houses exemplifies how it was commonly used in houses in the city. It utilizes the Gothic roof shape found in the steep front gable and a few decorative porch brackets. They are combined on a house that exhibits elements found in the Georgian Revival/Federal and the Greek Revival styles. These are found in the symmetry of the five-bay main block. Another neoclassical feature is the structure itself is composed of rubble stone that was plastered and then scored to resemble ashlar construction. This was even carried out on the kitchen wing in the back. The house also features a double-door main entrance that is capped by a transom, a modillion cornice and dressed stone quoins. The rectangular windows are nearly flush with the exterior walls and are capped with shallow rectangular hoods. There is a round-arch window in the front gable.
