= German American Heritage Center =

- Germania-Miller/Standard Hotel
- U.S. National Register of Historic Places
- Davenport Register of Historic Properties
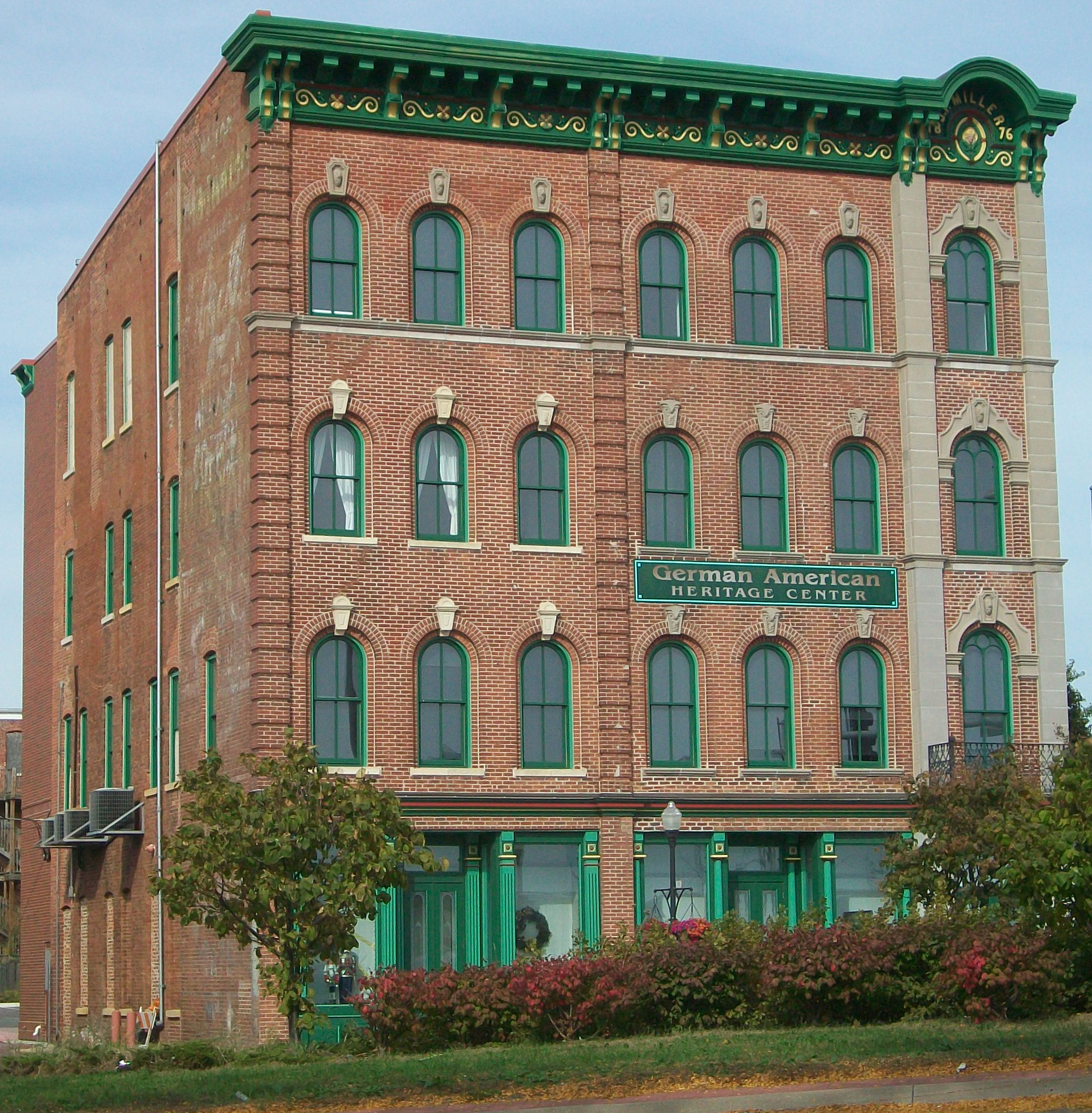

- Location within Iowa Location within the United States
- Location: 712 W. 2nd St. Davenport, Iowa
- Coordinates: 41°31′18″N 90°35′1″W
- Area: 1 acre (0.40 ha)
- Built: 1871
- Architectural style: Late Victorian
- MPS: Davenport MRA
- NRHP reference No.: 83002438
- DRHP No.: 19

Significant dates
- Added to NRHP: July 07, 1983
- Designated DRHP: September 12, 1996

The German American Heritage Center, also known as the Germania-Miller/Standard Hotel, is a cultural center and museum in Davenport, Iowa, United States, that chronicles and preserves the history of German-Americans in the Midwest region. The building was listed on the National Register of Historic Places in 1983.

== History ==
The German American Heritage Center was incorporated in 1994, and the board of directors purchased the Standard Hotel on the Davenport riverfront in 1993. The building was built by John Brus and opened in 1862 as the Germania House, a gasthaus (guest house), for immigrants. In 1876 it was bought by John Frederick Miller and renamed the Miller Hotel. He was a German immigrant who had been a manufacturer in the city since the 1850s. Miller also operated the restaurant, billiard room and saloon in the hotel until 1889. The hotel was used at this time by Scott County farmers when they came to Davenport. The hotel's name was changed several times in the 20th-century. It became the Arcade Hotel around 1906, the Henry Blessing Boarding House around 1917, and the Standard Hotel from 1924 to 1995. The retail space on the main floor was occupied by various tenants over the years. In 1983, the building was placed on the National Register of Historic Places, and on the Davenport Register of Historic Properties in 1996. In 2009, extensive renovations to the center were completed with enhanced multimedia and exhibit spaces.

== Architecture ==
The building is a fine example of high Victorian commercial architecture in Davenport. Of particular merit is the metal cornice that was apparently added by John Miller, whose name appears on it. The original storefronts had been removed and were restored in the 2009 renovation. The easternmost bay, where the hotel's main entrance was located, is more decorative than the other six and is below the cornice arch.
