= Claim House (Davenport, Iowa) =

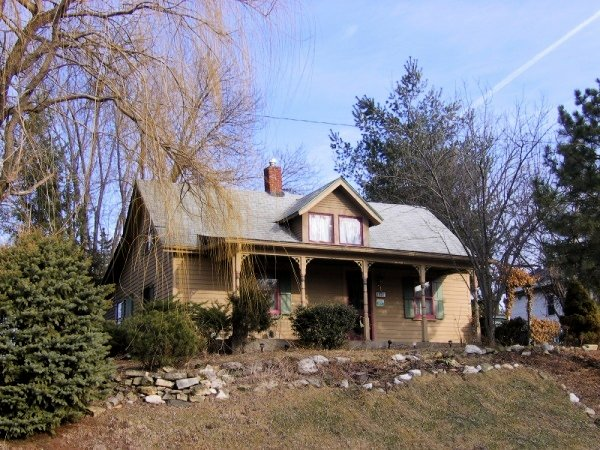

- Location within Iowa
- 41°32′2.6″N 90°33′23.7″W
- Location: 1329 College Ave. Davenport, Iowa

Site notes
- Area: less than one acre
- Governing body: Private

Davenport Register of Historic Properties
- Designated: October 7, 1992
- Reference no.: 3

The Claim House is a historic building in Davenport, Iowa, United States. The oldest part of the house dates from the early 1830s, and it is thought to be the oldest structure in the city. The house was listed on the Davenport Register of Historic Properties in 1992.

== History ==
The house was built in 1832 or 1833 by George L. Davenport, son of Colonel George Davenport, when he was 15 years old, It was built as a claim on his property and is thought to be the oldest structure in the city of Davenport. At that time the property was on land that had not yet been open to white settlement. The claim was made when the Sauk and Meskwaki tribes were being forced to surrender their lands following the Black Hawk War, and the area became known as the Black Hawk Purchase. Davenport was on friendly terms with the tribes and had their permission to settle on the land. Another early settler Dr. John Emerson took up a claim to the east and built a structure where he housed his slave Dred Scott.

The house was constructed of materials brought from Cincinnati, Ohio by way of the Mississippi River. The original structure measured 18 square feet (1.7 m^{2}), with subsequent additions including a lean-to kitchen. When looking at the front of the house there is a batten between the first and second windows from the left. The original house is to the right of the batten. A brick chimney replaces the original which was constructed of stone. The furthest window on the right side of the house was originally the location of the door into the house. In 1867, the house was dismantled and moved from its original location to its present location.

The property was covered in a 1982 and/or a 1983 study of Davenport's historic buildings. The house was nominated for the National Register of Historic Places in 1983, but it was not listed because of an objection from the owner.
