= Taylor School (Davenport, Iowa) =

- U.S. National Register of Historic Places
- Davenport Register of Historic Properties
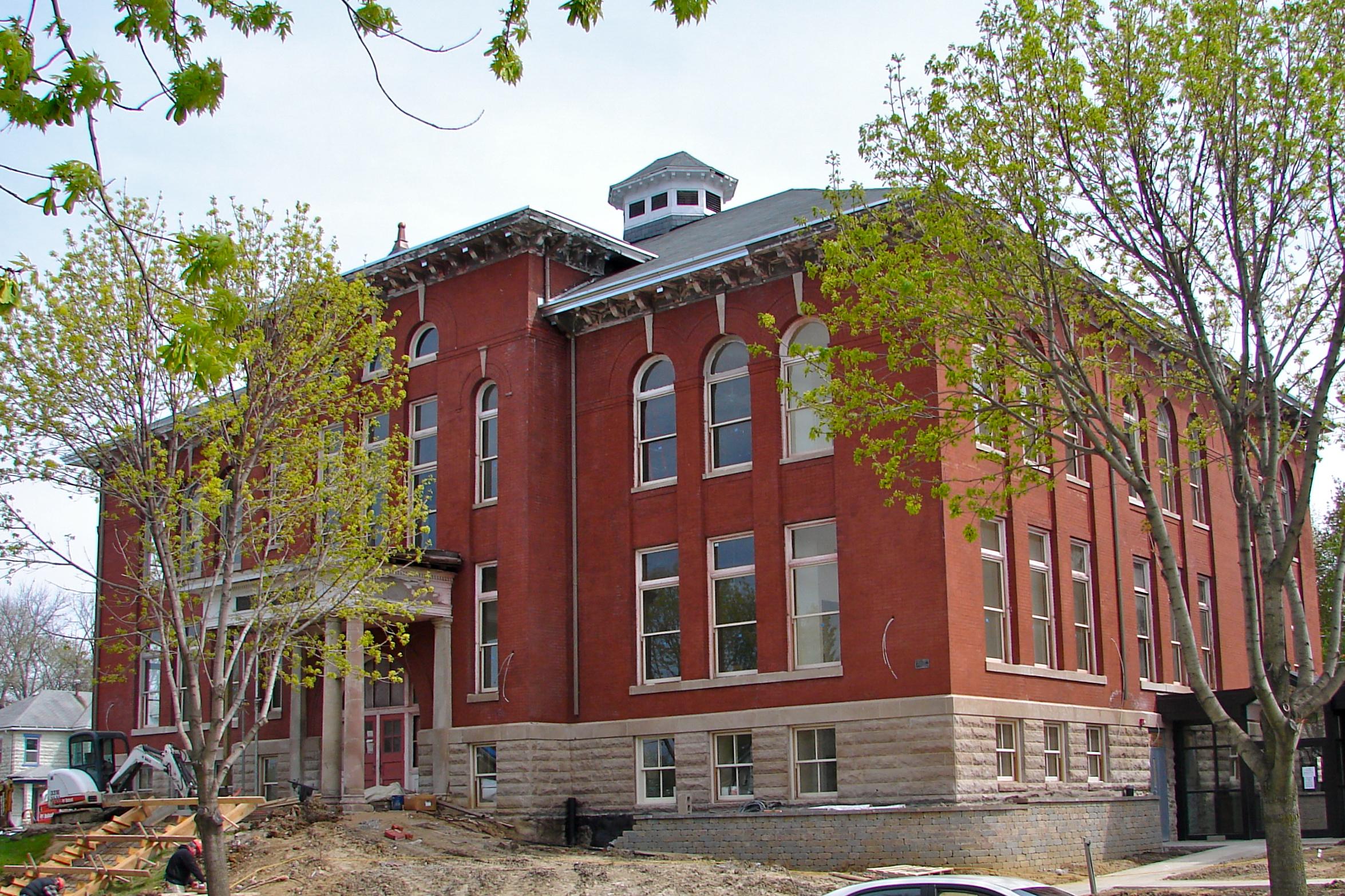

- Location within Iowa Location within the United States
- Location: 1400 Warren St. Davenport, Iowa
- Coordinates: 41°32′5″N 90°35′10″W
- Area: 2 acres (0.81 ha)
- Built: 1897-1898
- Architect: Clausen & Burrows
- Architectural style: Colonial Revival
- MPS: Davenport MRA
- NRHP reference No.: 83002516
- DRHP No.: 46

Significant dates
- Added to NRHP: July 7, 1983
- Designated DRHP: September 13, 2005

Taylor School is a historic building located in Davenport, Iowa, United States. The former grade school was listed on the National Register of Historic Places in 1983 and on the Davenport Register of Historic Properties in 2005.

== History ==
The building was built from 1897 to 1898 as School #11 when J. B. Young was superintendent. By 1898 the Davenport school district had twelve school buildings and a new school was being added every year. The district served more than 5,800 students with a staff of 142 teachers. The name of the building was changed to Taylor School in 1908. The "6-3-3" system was adopted for Davenport Schools in 1919 and Taylor continued to serve its central Davenport neighborhood as an elementary school. It later served as a school for students with intellectual disabilities in the district before it closed.

The building had sat empty for most of the 1990s and 2000s. A renovation process to convert the building into senior housing began in 2005. The plan included building an addition as well as renovating the old school building. Financial problems plagued an earlier attempt to develop the project. Construction began again on the project in May, 2010 by the Renaissance Realty Group of Chicago and the $11 million renovation was completed in June, 2011. The building is now known as The Taylor Renaissance, and features forty-one rental units for people 55 and above.

== Architecture ==
The Davenport architectural firm of Clausen & Burrows designed the building in the Colonial Revival style. The square block building is two stories high on a raised basement. It is built with red bricks and the basement is faced with large blocks of dressed limestone. The building features a hipped roof with bracketed eaves. The windows in the building are grouped in round-arched arcades. The arched main entrance is covered by a simple canopy with columns in the simplified Doric order.
