= Davenport Public Library =

Library in Davenport, Iowa, United States

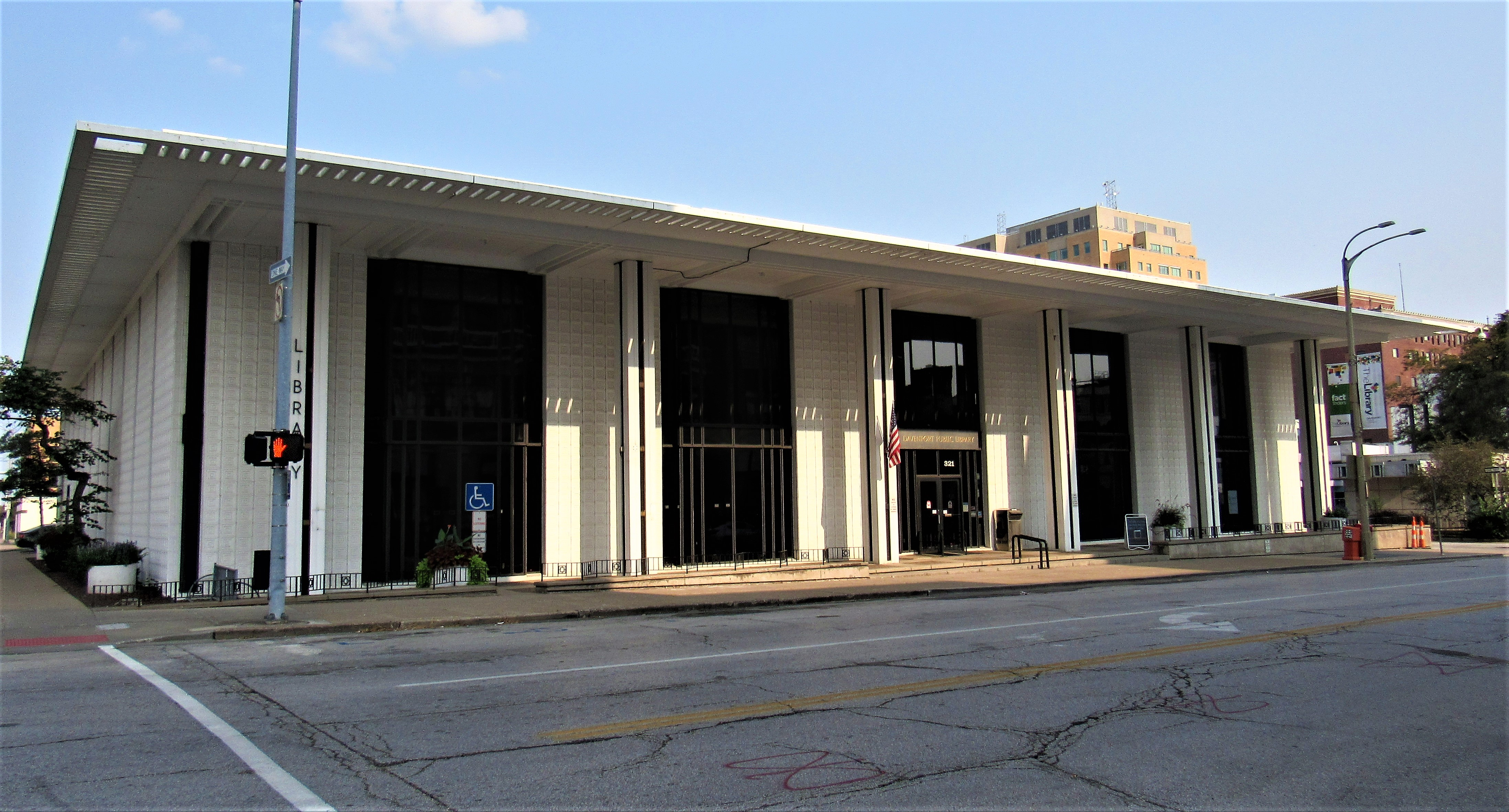
- Main Branch in 2018
- 41°31′24″N 90°34′31″W
- Location: 321 N. Main St. 3000 N. Fairmount St. 6000 Eastern Ave. Davenport, Iowa, United States
- Type: Public
- Established: 1877

Collection
- Size: 372,826

Access and use
- Circulation: 946,114 (2011)

Other information
- Director: Jeff Collins
- Public transit access: Davenport CitiBus
- Website: www.davenportlibrary.com
- Davenport Public Library
- U.S. Historic district – Contributing property
- Davenport Register of Historic Properties
- Built: 1968
- Architect: Edward Durell Stone
- Architectural style: New Formalism
- Part of: Davenport Downtown Commercial Historic District (ID100005546)
- DRHP No.: 59

Significant dates
- Added to NRHP: September 11, 2020
- Designated DRHP: January 23, 2019

The Davenport Public Library is a public library located in Davenport, Iowa. With a history dating back to 1839, the Davenport Public Library's Main Library is currently housed in a 1960s building designed by Kennedy Center architect Edward Durell Stone. The Davenport Public Library system is made up of three libraries—the Main Library at 321 Main Street; the Fairmount Branch Library at 3000 N. Fairmount Street (41°33′06″N 90°37′54″W); and the Eastern Avenue Branch Library at 6000 Eastern Avenue (41°34′59″N 90°33′12″W).

== History ==
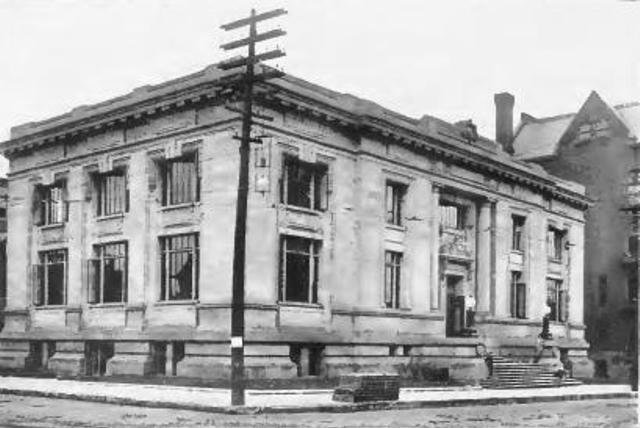
Carnegie Library

The library began with a reading room in the Le Claire Hotel established in 1839. Another reading room and circulating library were announced in an 1853 article in the Davenport Gazette. The library eventually leased an entire building. Although then named the Young Men's Library Association, it was managed by the community's women. In 1877, one of them—Clarissa Cook—pledged $10,000 to the library for the construction of its own building if property were obtained for the construction by the citizens. After successfully raising the funds to purchase a lot, the city laid the cornerstone for the Cook Memorial Building on November 7, 1877.

The library eventually outgrew its space. Even though the Library Association no longer had to pay rent and charged a fee for borrowing books, it was struggling financially and could not resolve the issue itself. Local author Alice French requested the assistance of her personal friend Andrew Carnegie, who was already becoming known for his philanthropic assistance of libraries. Carnegie promised to donate $50,000 to construct a new public library if the library were tax supported. The question was successfully put to the vote at the April 1900 election, the first in Iowa which permitted women voters. The city opened its Carnegie library, the largest west of the Mississippi River in 1904, with $75,000 in funds donated by Carnegie. The building was designed by Boston architect Calvin Kiessling. The library's first director in the new Carnegie building was Marilla Waite Freeman.

By 1960, the library had outgrown the Carnegie Building as well. It was expanded in 1963 to provide space for further services for children, but the expansion caused displacement of the sand on which the building was founded, leading to structural damage. In 1966, the Carnegie Building had to be demolished, and the library temporarily relocated to a disused department store until new quarters could be constructed. The subsequent Davenport Public Library building, designed by architect Edward Durell Stone, was opened on October 6, 1968. The local architectural firm of Stewart-Robison-Laffan served as associate architects. In 2019, it was listed on the Davenport Register of Historic Properties. In 2020, the building was included as a contributing property in the Davenport Downtown Commercial Historic District on the National Register of Historic Places.

== Branches ==
While the library had long maintained branches in area schools, it opened its first official branch, the 4,200-square-foot (390 m^{2}) Annie Wittenmyer Branch, on April 3, 1978. This branch was located in the historic Annie Wittenmyer Complex, in rooms that were used as the kitchen and dining room of the former Iowa Soldiers' Orphans' Home. However, due to the growth of the area and the proximity of this branch to the Main Library, officials began considering where to better locate a branch building in the mid-1980s. The citizens of Davenport passed a referendum in 2003 that supported the building and operation of two new library branches. The Annie Wittenmyer Branch closed in November 2005. The Fairmount Branch Library opened on Saturday, January 14, 2006; and the Eastern Avenue Branch Library opened on Saturday, July 10, 2010, completing the library expansion project.

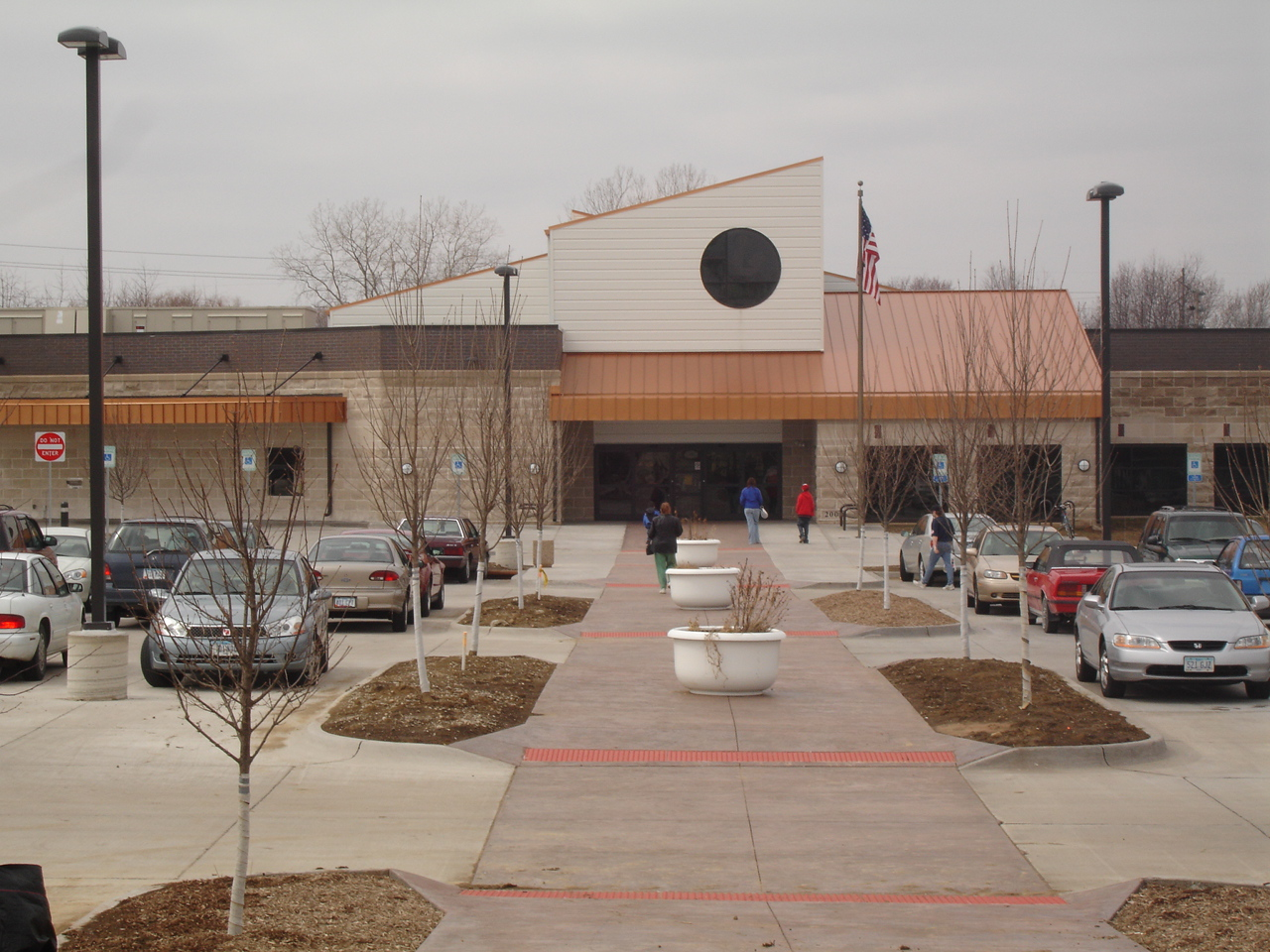
Fairmount Branch

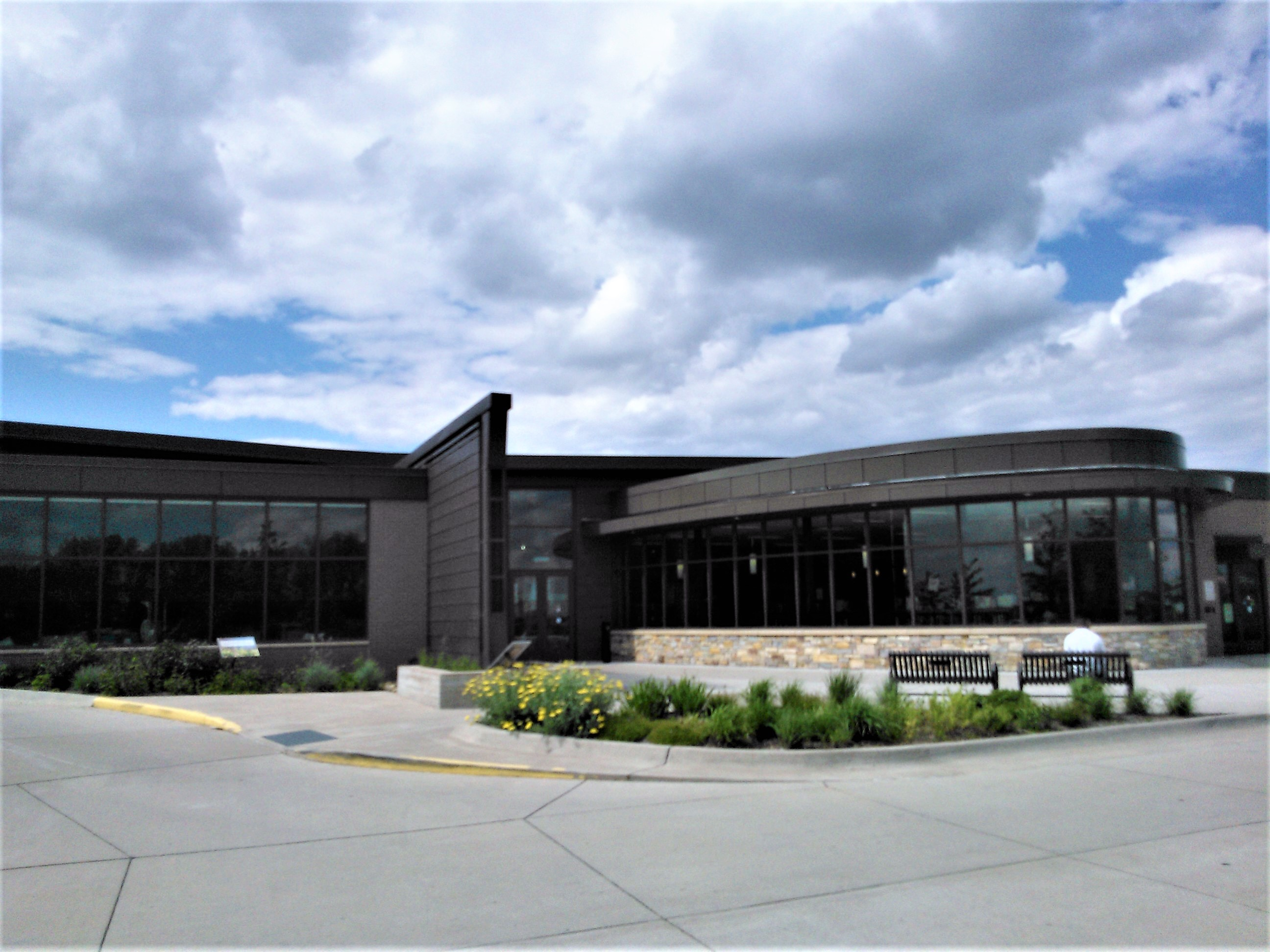
Eastern Avenue Branch
