= Johnson School (Davenport, Iowa) =

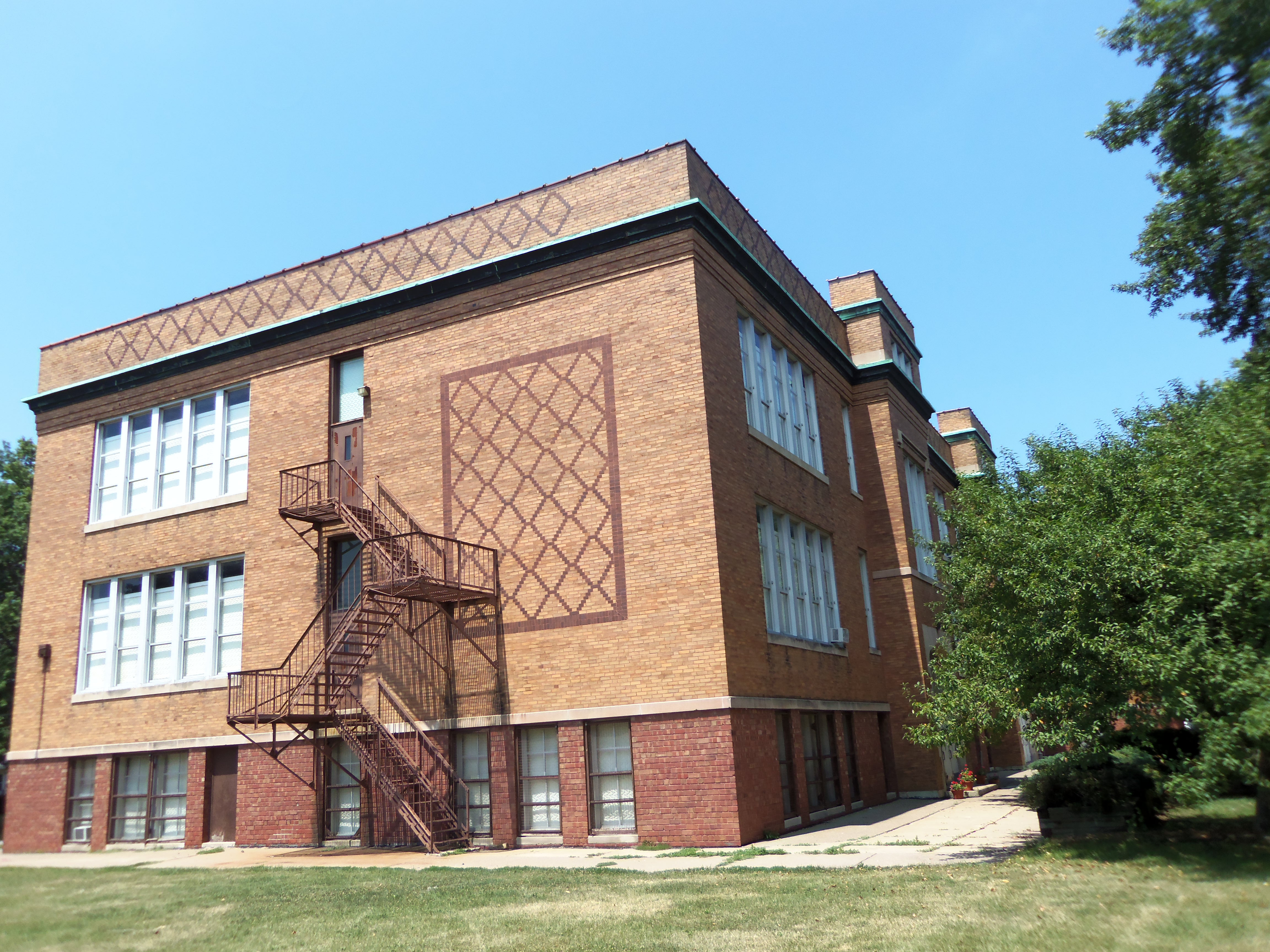

- Location within Iowa
- 41°32′16″N 90°36′33″W
- Location: 1730 Wilkes Ave. Davenport, Iowa

History
- Built: 1910

Site notes
- Governing body: Private

Davenport Register of Historic Properties
- Designated: November 30, 2004
- Reference no.: 43

Johnson School is a historic building located on the west side of Davenport, Iowa, United States. It was listed on the Davenport Register of Historic Properties on November 30, 2004. It was built as an elementary school in 1910 for the Davenport Community School District and ceased functioning as a school in 2002 along with Grant Elementary School. Controversy surrounded the school board's decision to close both schools. Today it is owned and operated by The Five Points Wellness Center and houses many local small businesses including The Institute of Therapeutic Massage and Wellness, 5 Points Wellness Chiropractic, Artistic Intensity Dance, Overstreet's Top Notch Boxing, The Love Of It Custom Tee's & More, and The Davenport Chordbusters, and many more.
