= Schuetzen Park (Iowa) =

Park in Iowa, United States

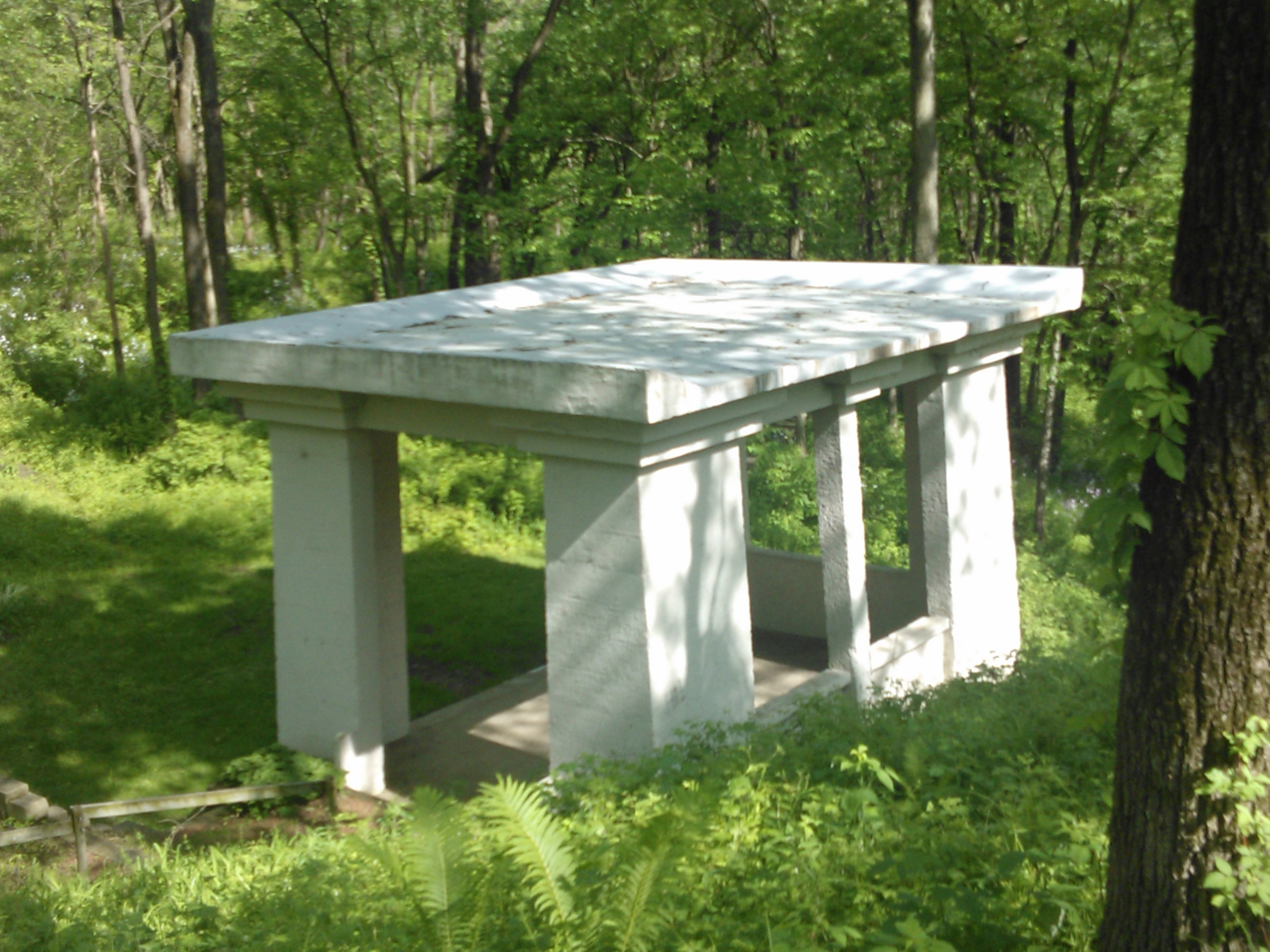
- Streetcar Station
- Interactive map of Schuetzen Park
- Type: Privately owned park
- Location: Davenport, Iowa
- Coordinates: 41°31′28″N 90°37′24″W
- Area: 26-acre (0.11 km^{2})
- Created: 1868
- Operator: Schuetzenpark Gilde
- Open: April - November

Davenport Register of Historic Properties
- Official name: Schuetzen Park Street Car Pavilion
- Designated: August 5, 1998
- Reference no.: 22

Schuetzen Park is a privately owned 26-acre (110,000 m^{2}) park located in the west end of Davenport, Iowa, United States. It was developed by the Davenport Schuetzengesellschaft as a location for the practice of target shooting in the traditional German style called "Schuetzen". The park is now owned and operated by the non-profit Schuetzenpark Gilde.

== History ==
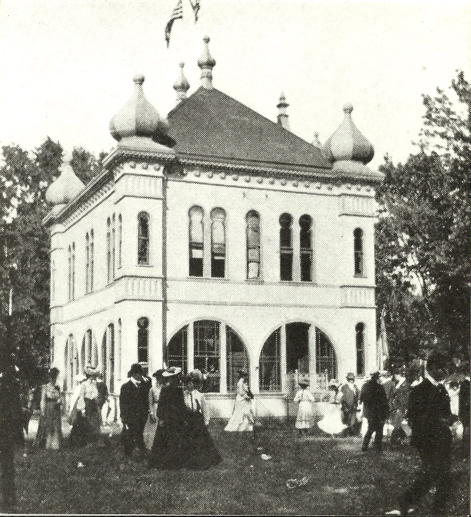
Music Pavilion at Schuetzen Park, Davenport, Iowa

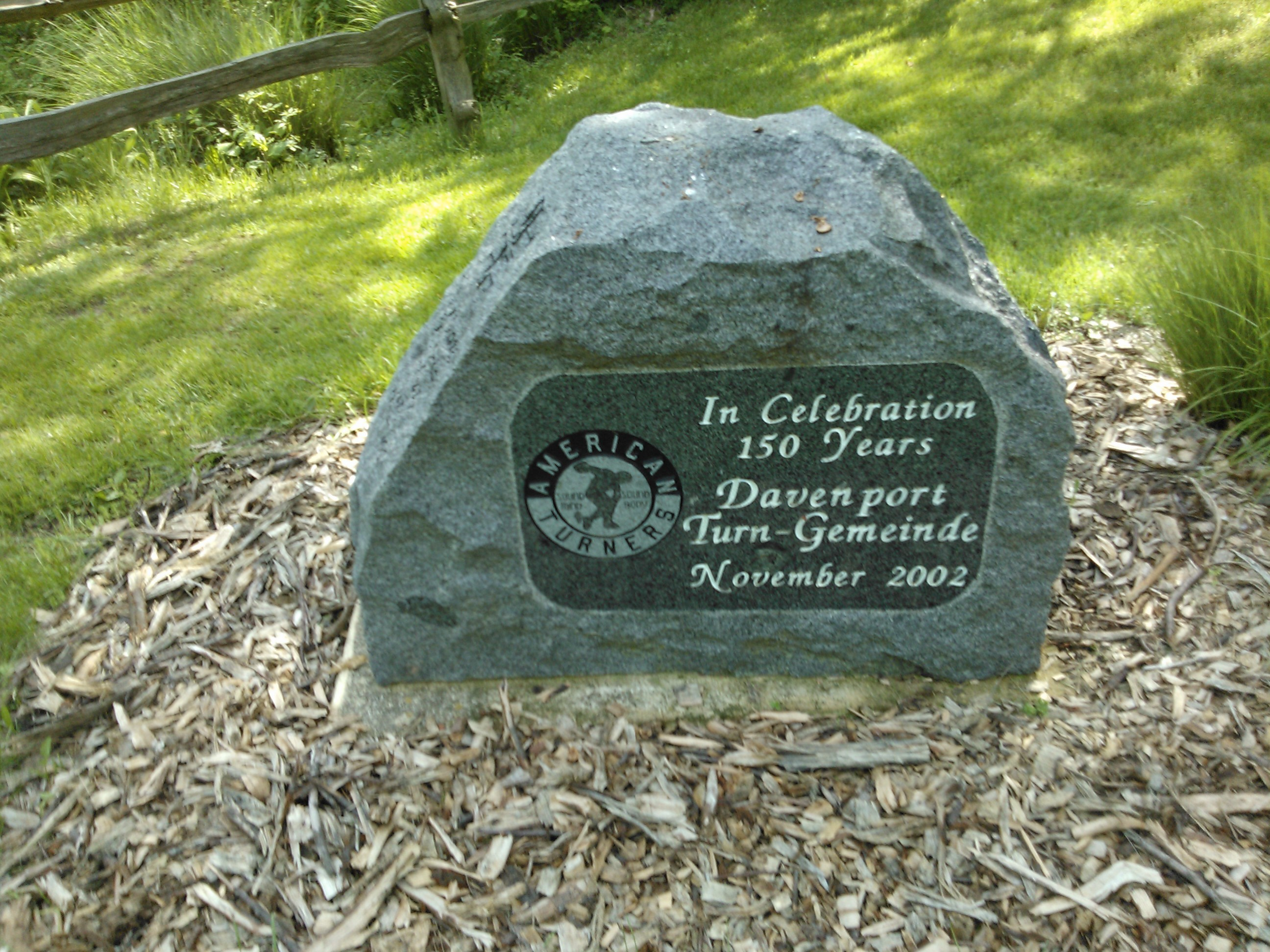
Turn-Gemeinde Memorial

The park opened on June 12, 1870. At its zenith, the park consisted of an Inn, music pavilion, dance hall, shooting range, refreshment stands, roller coaster, bowling alleys and a zoo. Many organizations are associated with Schuetzen Park, however, the best known of these is the Davenport Turngemeinde. Many Turngemeinde members were also members of the Schuetzengesellschaft and the Turners also had an athletic field at the park for their outdoor track events. A monument in commemoration of the 150th anniversary of the Davenport Turngemeinde (2002) can be seen in the park.

The park flourished until the outbreak of World War I, when anti-German sentiment rose in Davenport and across the country. The German language was outlawed, German books were removed from the library, citizens of German birth were interrogated about their loyalty to the United States, many German businesses changed their names, the Schuetzenverein was renamed the Davenport Shooting Association and Schuetzenpark was for a time renamed Forest Park.

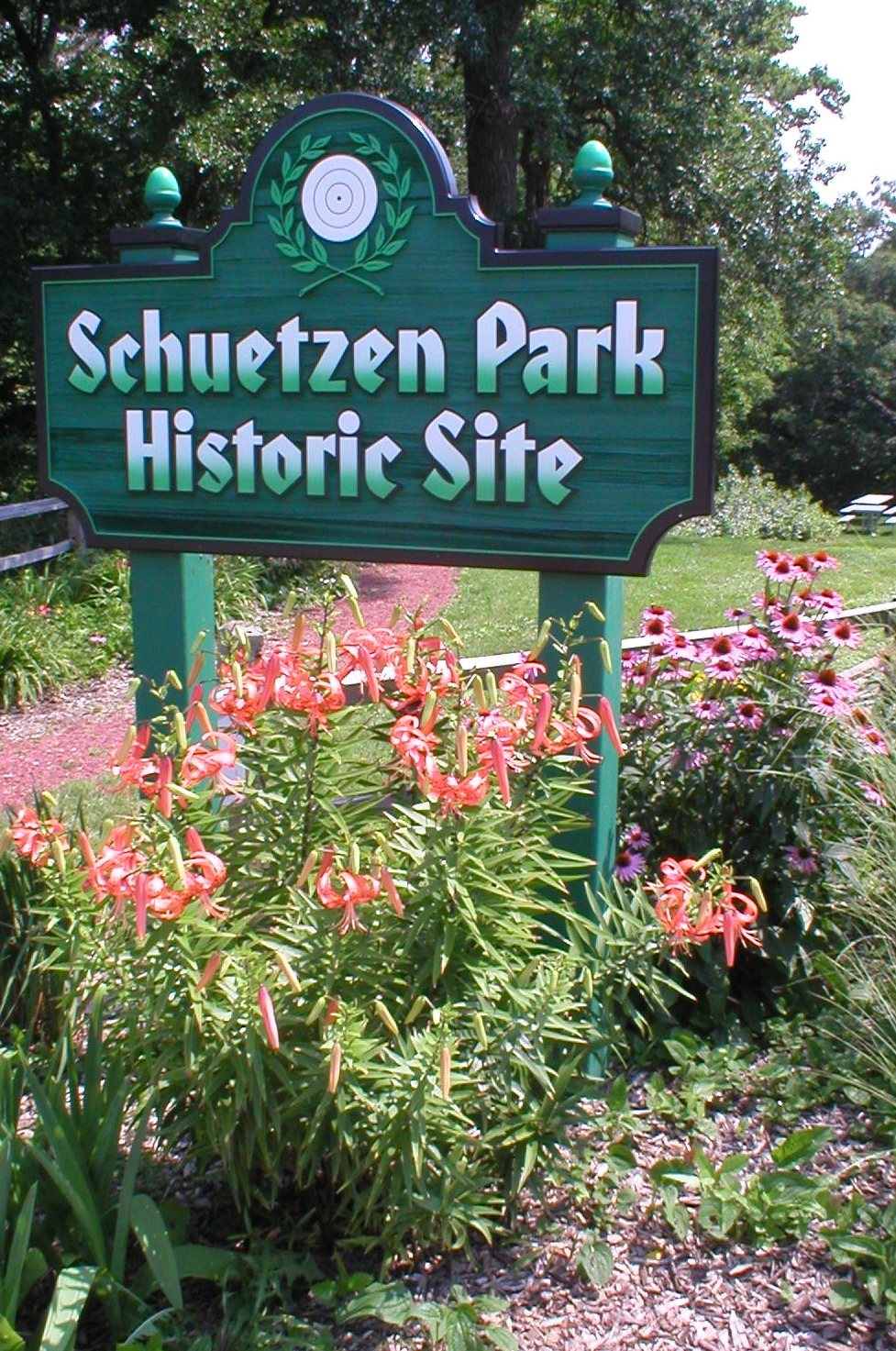
Welcome Sign at Schuetzen Park, Davenport, Iowa

In 1923 the park was sold to the Chiropractic Psychopathic Sanitarium for $3,500. There was an understanding that the sanitarium would allow the public to use the park, and the shooting club would be allowed to use the shooting range until the real estate contract was completed. After the final payment was made in 1939 the shooting club created another shooting range on Utica Ridge Road in Davenport and eventually moved to a site near Princeton. The sanitarium remained on the property for forty years. The grounds and the buildings from the park were either renovated or replaced to fit the hospital's needs. In 1960 the sanitarium complex was sold to the Good Samaritan Society for use as a nursing home and assisted living center. The nursing home still remains in operation on a small portion of the site.

In 1995 restoration efforts began of the grounds and once again cultural events and other activities take place there. The park has acres of nature trails, a deer pond, Bavarian Wayside Shrine and the granite remains of the German Savings Bank. In 2005 a new picnic pavilion was erected and in 2008 a new bandstand was constructed. As in years past, a summer concert series is traditionally held in the park and a wide range of musical styles are presented.

== Streetcar Station ==
Schuetzen Park's streetcar railway station, built in 1911, is the only original structure that remains from the park. The station was designed in the Egyptian Revival style by John F. Bredow, the first manager of Electric Light Company in Davenport. It was constructed of poured concrete, and measures 21 by 15 feet (6.4 m × 4.6 m) in size and served as a waiting station for park patrons who rode the trolley car to and from the park. A $1,000 bequest from Davenport brewer Henry Koehler, who had owned the Independent Malting Company, paid for its construction. It was listed on the Davenport Register of Historic Properties on August 5, 1998.

Renovation of the structure began in late 2011 with repairing the roof. The second phase was completed in the fall of 2014 and included repairs to the ceiling's support beams and resurfacing the outside walls. The third and final phase completed in 2018 included ceiling repairs, new lighting, cleaning and painting. The projects were paid for with private donations and grants.
