= Hose Station No. 6 =

- U.S. National Register of Historic Places
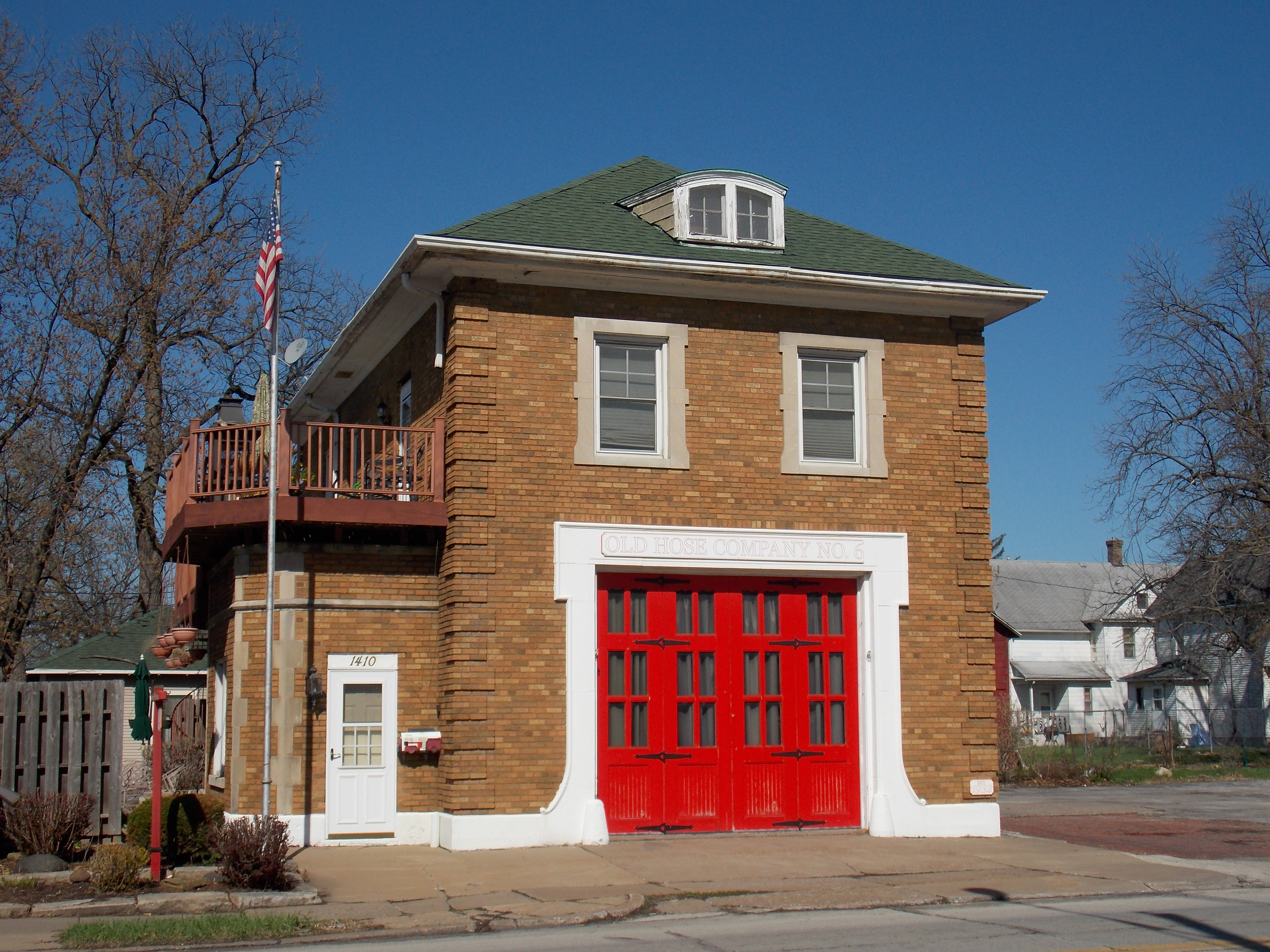

- Location within Iowa Location within the United States
- Location: 1410 Marquette Street; Davenport, Iowa
- Coordinates: 41°32′3″N 90°35′31″W
- Area: less than one acre
- Built: 1910
- Architectural style: Renaissance Revival
- MPS: Davenport MRA
- NRHP reference No.: 83002450
- Added to NRHP: July 7, 1983

Hose Station No. 6 is located in a residential neighborhood in the West End of Davenport, Iowa, United States. It has been listed on the National Register of Historic Places since 1983. It is one of two former fire stations in the West End that are still in existence. The other one is Hose Station No. 7.

== History ==
The first group of volunteer firefighters in Davenport were organized in 1856 and called the Independent Fire Engine and Hose Company. The city's first firehouse, Hose Station No. 1, was built on Perry Street in 1877 for the Fire King Engine 2nd Hose Company. Around the turn of the 20th-century, the city built other small hose stations throughout the city such as Hose Station No. 6. The building is now a private home.

== Architecture ==
The fire station was built in the Renaissance Revival style in 1910. The two-story structure follows a rectangular plan, a projecting side bay, and a brick exterior. There is also a short tower in the rear of the building in which the hoses dried. The fire engine entrance features a dogear concrete surround and quoining on the side bay. Rectangular windows are used throughout the building with the pair on the main facade's second floor having modified Gibbs surrounds. The building is capped with a hipped roof with a small curved roof dormer on the front.
