= Davenport Motor Row and Industrial Historic District =

Historic district in Iowa, United States

- U.S. National Register of Historic Places
- U.S. Historic district
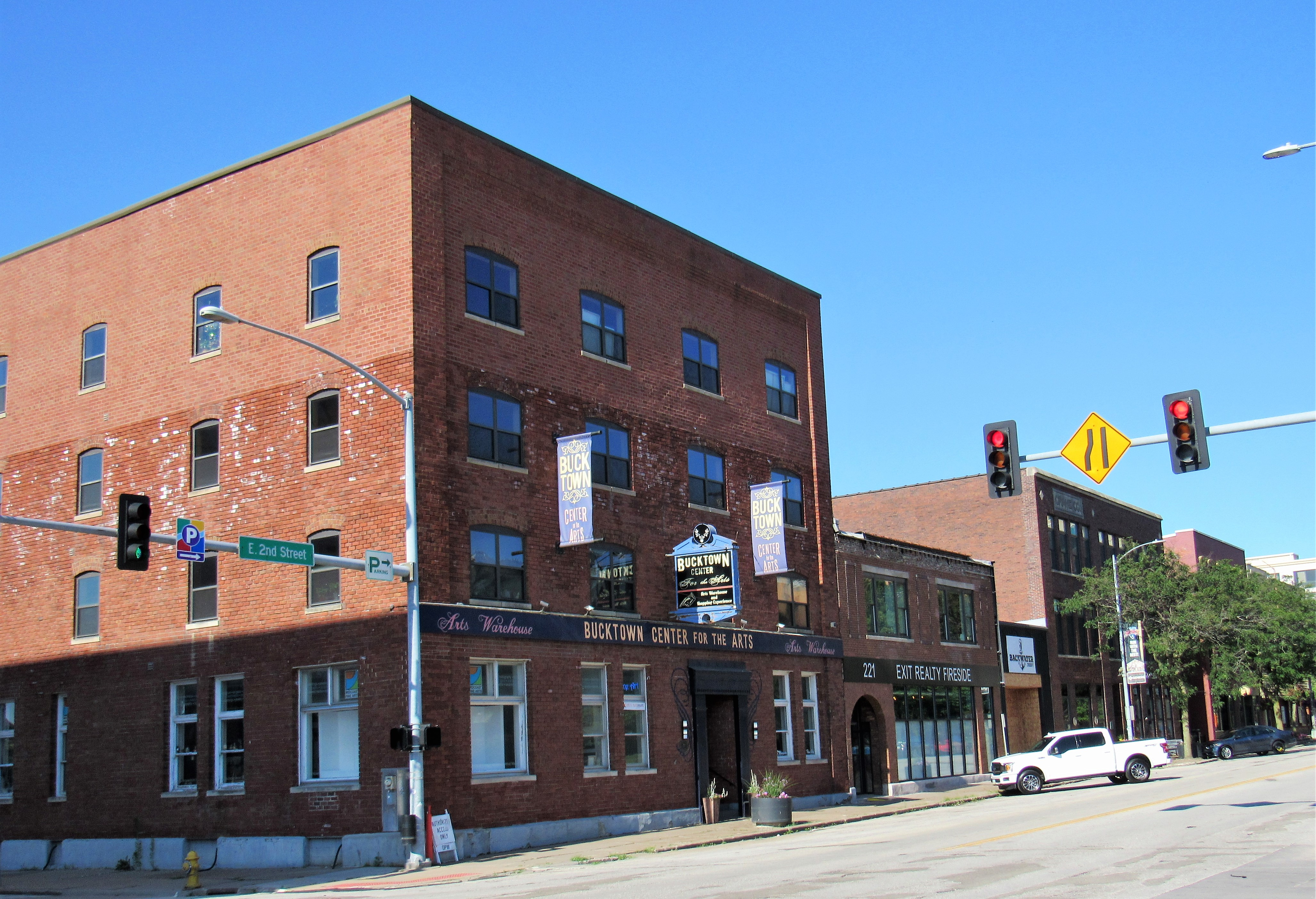
- Buildings on the 200 Block of East Second St.

- Location within Iowa Location within the United States
- Location: River Dr., 2nd & 3rd Sts. between Perry & Iowa Sts., Davenport, Iowa
- Coordinates: 41°31′17″N 90°34′16″W
- Area: 10 acres (4.0 ha)
- Architect: J.W. Ross; Clausen & Kruse, et al
- Architectural style: Italianate; Late 19th and 20th Century Revivals; Late 19th and 20th Century American Movements
- NRHP reference No.: 100004113
- Added to NRHP: June 27, 2019

The Davenport Motor Row and Industrial Historic District is a nationally recognized historic district located on the eastern edge of downtown Davenport, Iowa, United States. It was listed on the National Register of Historic Places in 2019.

== History ==
At the time of its nomination it consisted of 28 resources, which included 21 contributing buildings, one contributing site, one contributing structure, and five non-contributing buildings. The area was previously a part of the notorious Bucktown, a district of saloons, beer gardens, brothels, billiard parlors, gambling establishments, and theaters. Davenport licensed prostitution in 1893, gambling in 1904, and failed to enforce Iowa prohibition laws during this period. A crusade against vice by Davenport's Catholic bishop, Henry Cosgrove, and reforms by state leaders led to the district's transformation in the early 20th century into a light industrial area. The city's automobile industry settled here beginning in the 1910s. They stayed until the mid-20th century when Interstate 80 was completed on the north side of the city and they moved to the suburban areas. U.S. Route 32 and its successor U.S. Route 6 passed through the district on East Second Street from 1926 to 1937. The Government Bridge (1896), which for years was the city's only bridge across the Mississippi River, is immediately adjacent to the district.

The district can be divided into two sections based on building usage. On the south side between River Drive and East Second Street are the manufacturing, jobbing, and warehousing buildings. The location of the Chicago, Milwaukee, St. Paul and Pacific rail siding was in the alley, now known as Emerson Place. The alley is the contributing site. To the north between East Second and Third Streets is the location for the automobile industry buildings. These include gas and service stations, auto dealerships, tire and auto parts service and stores, an implement dealership, and a taxi company garage. The elevated rail bridge at East Third and Iowa Streets is the contributing structure. Hose Station No. 1 (1877), which housed automotive uses on its first floor from the 1930s to the 1950s, and the Davenport Bag and Paper Company Building (1907) are individually listed on the National Register of Historic Places. A block north of this historic district is the Crescent Warehouse Historic District, another former light industrial area. The Davenport Downtown Commercial Historic District, a larger commercial district, is immediately to the west.
