= Nicholas J. Kuhnen House =

Historic house in Iowa, United States

- U.S. National Register of Historic Places
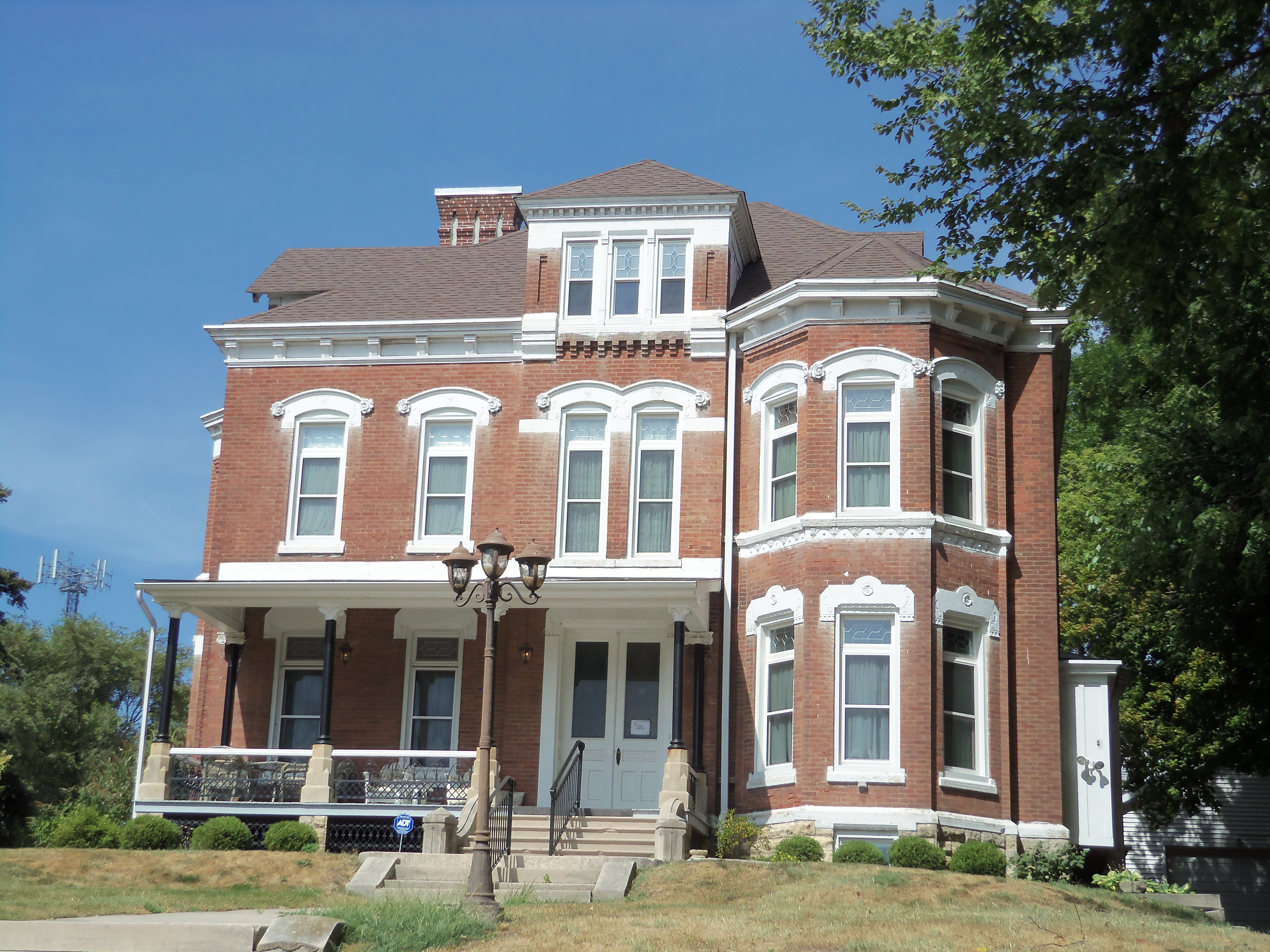

- Location within Iowa Location within the United States
- Location: 702 Perry St. Davenport, Iowa
- Coordinates: 41°31′39″N 90°34′22″W
- Area: less than one acre
- Built: 1887
- Architect: John Ross
- Architectural style: Italianate
- MPS: Davenport MRA
- NRHP reference No.: 83002462
- Added to NRHP: July 7, 1983

The Nicholas J. Kuhnen House is a historic building located in central Davenport, Iowa, United States. It has been listed on the National Register of Historic Places since 1983.

== Nicholas J. Kuhnen ==
Nicholas Kuhnen was born in Prussia and immigrated to the United States in the 19th century, settling in Davenport. He set up a small tobacco shop in 1854. Prior to the American Civil War, he expanded his business to include cigar wholesaling and manufacturing. He became one of four cigar manufacturers in the city at that time. In the 1860s he distributed free tobacco seeds to area farmers in the hopes of acquiring a reliable local supply of tobacco. The effort did not work to Kuhnen's benefit as the farmers found the necessary care of the plants to be too much work for them. By the 1880s he had the largest cigar factory north of St. Louis, Missouri and west of Chicago and at times employed 500 people.

He had to deal with two labor strikes in the 1880s. The workers were protesting low pay, poor working conditions, and long hours. The first strike ended after a short time because of the workers' fear of the management. The second strike had the assistance of the International Cigar Makers Union under the leadership of Peter Knickrehm, a cigar maker himself and a Socialist. It weakened the company financially, but Kuhnen emerged from the strike victorious and the company continued in business until 1915. Alex Anderson and Frank Rhoades took over the business after Kuhnen and they were succeeded by Smith, Reimers and Company.

== Architecture ==
Unlike many German immigrants to Davenport who lived on the west side of town, especially in what is now known as the Hamburg Historic District, Kuhnen built his home on the east side of town. The house was designed by Davenport architect John Ross. It follows the Italianate style, which was popular in the city at the time. Unlike some of the earlier manifestations of the style in Davenport that favored the simplicity derived from the Greek Revival, the Kuhnen House features high Victorian embellishment. It is a two-story structure that is situated on a large corner lot. It features bracketed eaves, a central pavilion that protrudes from the main façade, a porch that covers two-thirds of the front of the building, projecting bays, and triangular roof dormers. Brick and stone are utilized to achieve a polychrome exterior. There is also a variety of window styles employed on the house.
