= Hose Station No. 7 =

- U.S. National Register of Historic Places
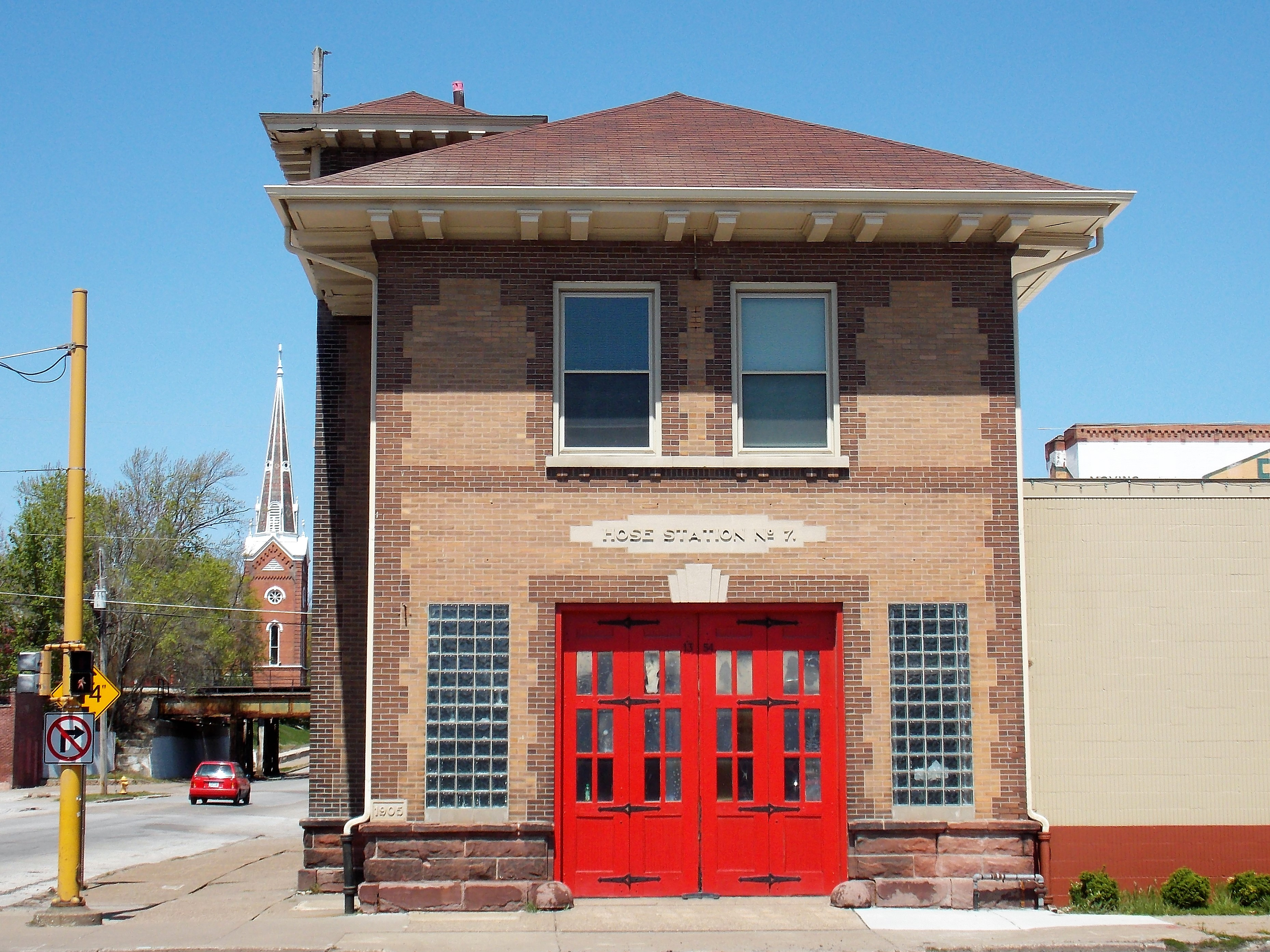

- Location within Iowa Location within the United States
- Location: 1354 W. 4th St. Davenport, Iowa
- Coordinates: 41°31′25″N 90°35′38″W
- Area: less than one acre
- Built: 1905
- Architectural style: Renaissance Revival
- MPS: Davenport MRA
- NRHP reference No.: 83002451
- Added to NRHP: July 7, 1983

The Hose Station No. 7 is located along a busy thoroughfare in a light industrial area of the west end of Davenport, Iowa, United States. It was listed on the National Register of Historic Places in 1983.

== History ==
The first group of volunteer firefighters in Davenport were organized in 1856 and called the Independent Fire Engine and Hose Company. The city's first firehouse, Hose Station No. 1, was built on Perry Street in 1877 for the Fire King Engine 2nd Hose Company. Around the turn of the 20th century, the city built other small hose stations throughout the city such as Hose Station No. 7. They were built in response to the East Davenport Fire of 1901. This building housed one of seven hose companies and two ladder companies in Davenport's fire department. The company had a crew of four that was headed by Capt. Christian R. Thiessen. The building has held several different businesses after it was replaced by larger, more modern fire stations.

== Architecture ==
The fire station was built in the Renaissance Revival style in 1905. Hose Station No. 7 features a rectangular plan, a hipped roof, bracketed eaves, a short tower in which the hoses dried, and a brick exterior with brick quoining. A single pair of firehouse doors, behind which the firefighting equipment was stored, fronted Fourth Street. The pedestrian entrance is off Fillmore Street. All of the windows are rather large and rectangular in shape. The pair of windows on the main facade's second floor has stylized Gibbs surrounds that stand out against the buildings lighter brick walls. An addition was built onto the east side of the building in later years.
