= Davenport Bag and Paper Company Building =

- U.S. National Register of Historic Places
- U.S. Historic district – Contributing property
- Davenport Register of Historic Properties
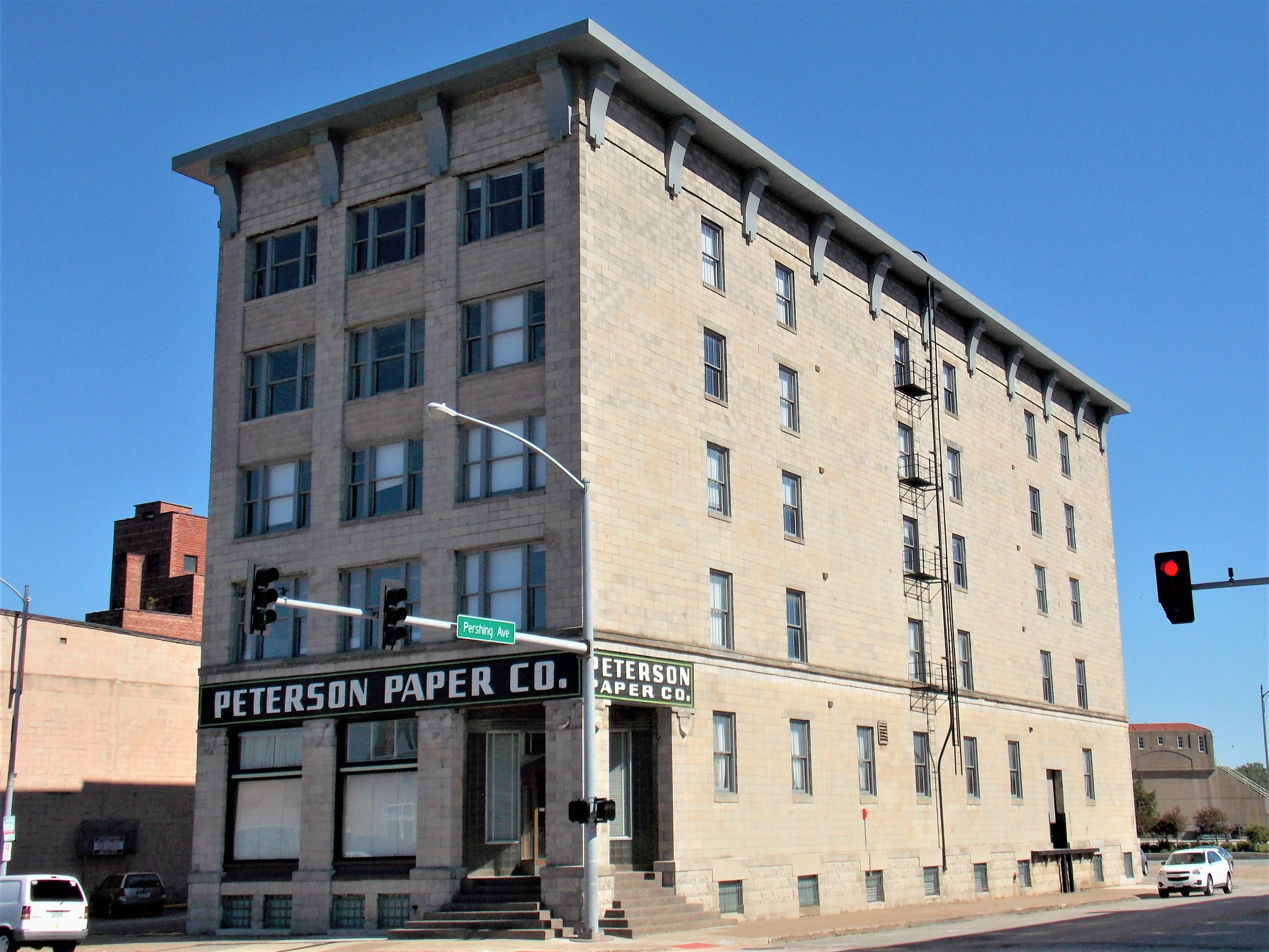

- Location within Iowa Location within the United States
- Location: 301 E. 2nd St. Davenport, Iowa
- Coordinates: 41°31′15.8″N 90°34′15.4″W
- Area: less than one acre
- Built: 1907
- Part of: Davenport Motor Row and Industrial Historic District (ID100004113)
- NRHP reference No.: 100001972
- DRHP No.: 55

Significant dates
- Added to NRHP: January 19, 2018
- Designated DRHP: November 15, 2012

The Davenport Bag and Paper Company Building, also known as the Peterson Bag and Paper Building, is a historic building located in downtown Davenport, Iowa, United States. It was listed on the Davenport Register of Historic Properties in 2012. In 2018 it was individually listed on the National Register of Historic Places, and in 2019 it was included as a contributing property in the Davenport Motor Row and Industrial Historic District.

== History ==
The building was built in 1907 for the Davenport Bag & Paper Company. The five-story building is composed of reinforced concrete blocks, and it is considered the first "fireproof" building built in the city after a 1901 fire that caused more than $1.25 million in damages and destroyed eight city blocks. The Chicago-style of architecture, which the building employs with its wide windows on the main facade, is one of the results of the technological advancements that came about after the Great Chicago Fire. The revolving door at the main entrance is rare in the Quad Cities. Davenport Bag & Paper produced paper bags, wrapping paper and flour sacks. They used the building for its entire operation, which included manufacturing and warehousing. This part of the Central Business District was home to similar facilities until World War I.

The Peterson Paper Company occupied the building by 1940. They were founded as the H.A. Morrow Company in 1907, and the Peterson family took over in 1918. They remained here until 1998 when they were bought by Great Western Supply, another Davenport company. The building sat empty until it was purchased by Manisha Baheti and Joe Erenberger who converted it into 19 apartments in 2012.
