= Iowa Soldiers' Orphans' Home =

- U.S. National Register of Historic Places
- U.S. Historic district
- Davenport Register of Historic Properties
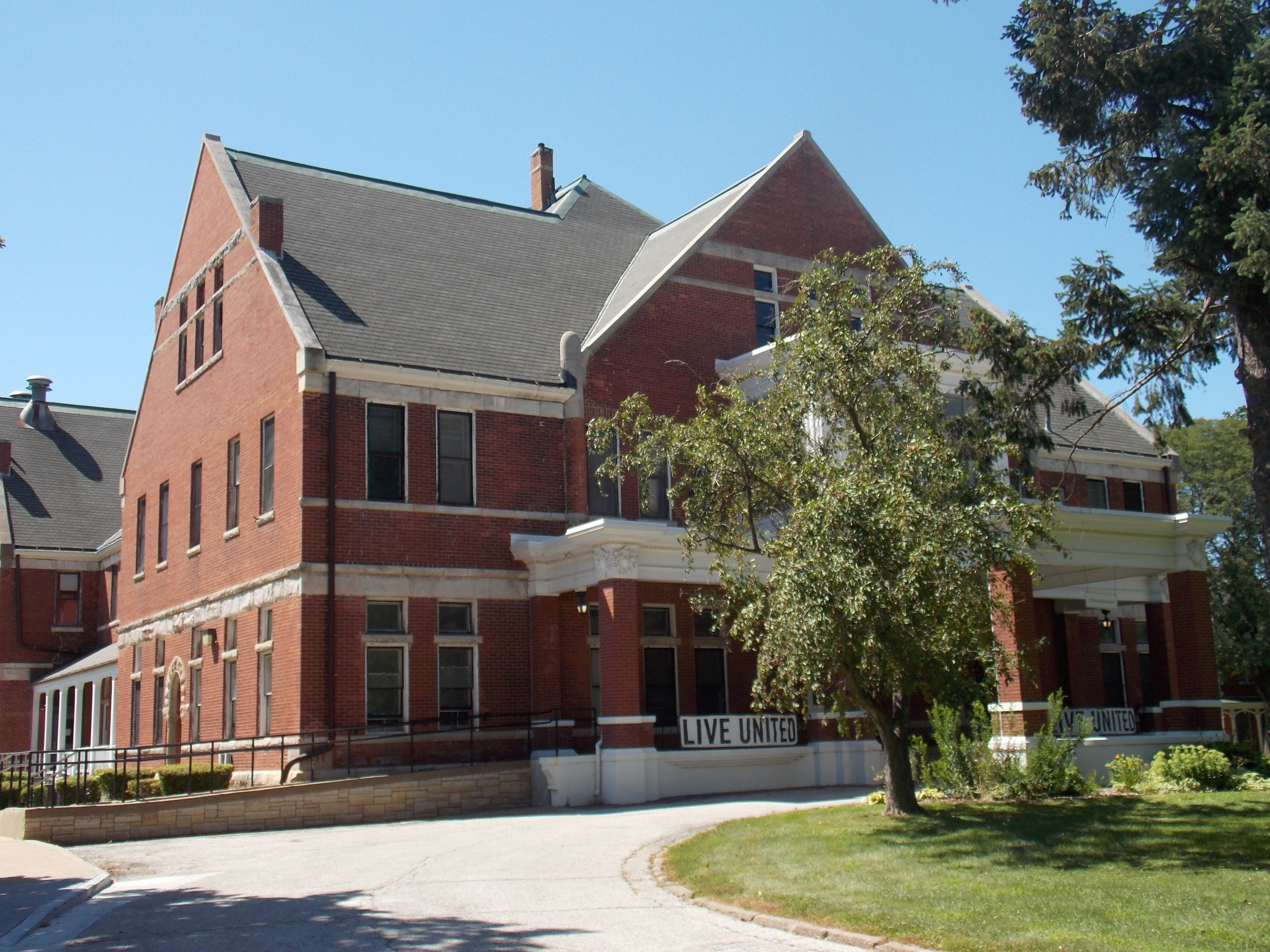
- The main building at the Home

- Location within city
- Location: 2800 Eastern Ave. Davenport, Iowa
- Coordinates: 41°32′49.74″N 90°33′11.17″W
- Area: 31.9 acres (12.9 ha)
- Built: 1865
- Architect: John W. Ross; H.F. Liebbe; J. Bradley Rust
- Architectural style: Classical Revival; Queen Anne
- NRHP reference No.: 82002641
- DRHP No.: 17/37

Significant dates
- Added to NRHP: April 26, 1982
- Designated DRHP: May 15, 1996

The Iowa Soldiers' Orphans' Home, also known at the Annie Wittenmyer Home or the Annie Wittenmyer Center, located in Davenport, Iowa, is a former orphanage. The home was originally used for orphans from the American Civil War. Starting in 1876, children from broken homes, as well as orphans from all of Iowa's 99 counties, were taken in at the home. It is listed on the Davenport Register of Historic Properties and as a historic district on the National Register of Historic Places.

== History ==
Annie Turner Wittenmyer was a sanitation agent for Iowa whose job was to oversee the needs of Union Army soldiers during the American Civil War. Iowa contributed approximately 76,000 men to the army, and one of them wrote a letter saying,

We are grateful for all the kindness shown us ... but we prefer you should forget us ... if you will but look after our wives and children, our mothers and sisters, who are dependent upon us for support ... Succor them, and hold your charity from us.

The letter was read at a convention, after which a board was convened to create a residence for the orphans of Iowa soldiers. Wittenmyer, a trustee and board member, managed to raise money for the construction of the home with some donations reaching $500 ($6900 in 2010 dollars).

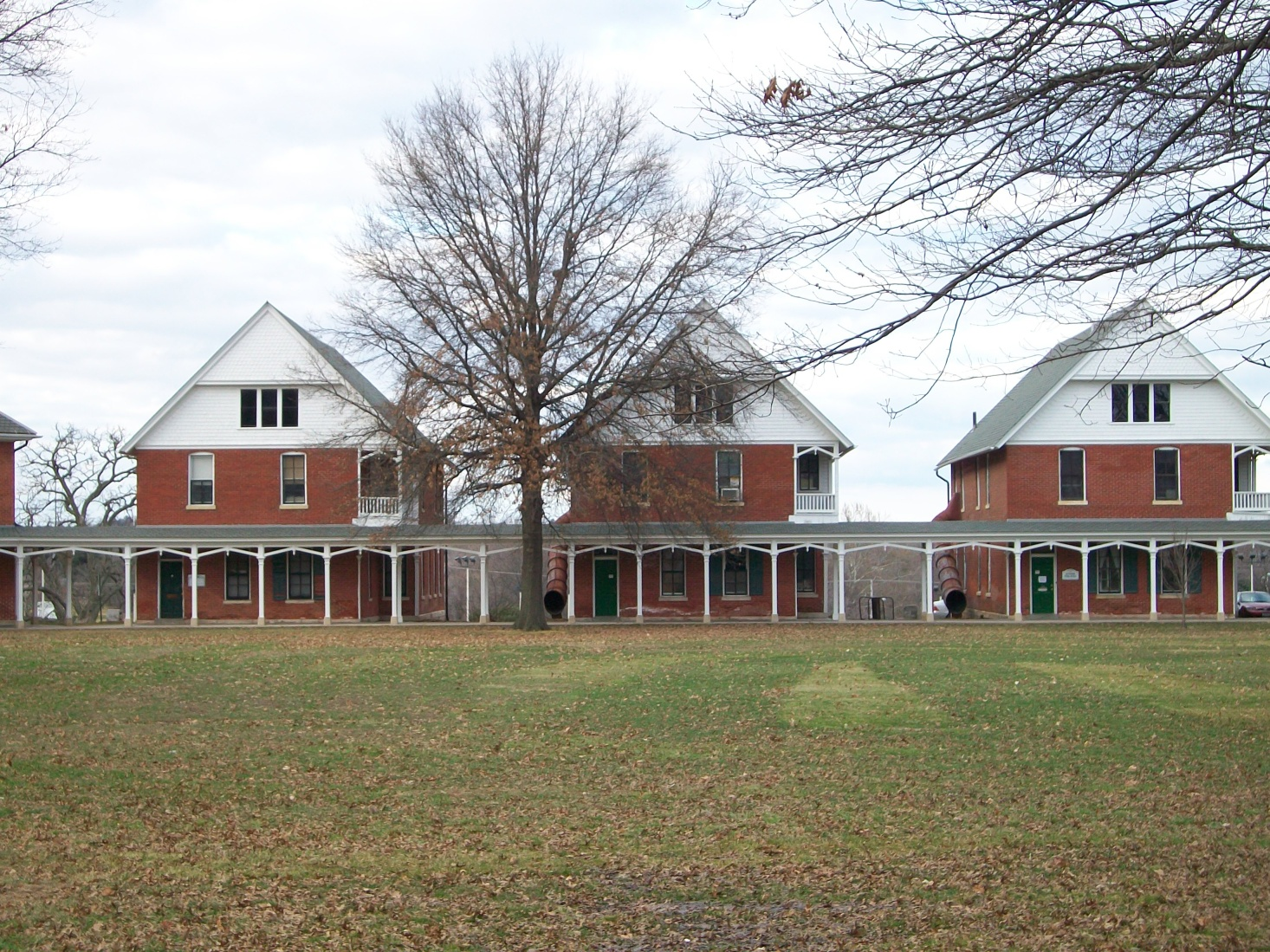
The cottage style housing.

The location had been a meeting area and treatment center for the pioneers, settlers, and the indigenous peoples of the region, including War Chief Black Hawk and the Sauk, Fox, Kickapoo, Potawatomi, and Winnebago tribes. The land was also a center for the war wounded from the Mexican-American War, which included the housing and care of the long-term casualties. The residents kept a small farm and were taught to farm by German-Danish immigrant Claus Einfeldt.

After the Civil War ended, over 13,500 children were in need of assistance as a result of the war deaths of Iowans—with many more badly wounded. An orphan's fair was held asking branches be built in three different Iowa cities and Farmington was soon considered inadequate to the Davenport home. Davenport was a center for Union volunteer units, and after the war ended, soldier camps were not needed. Camp Kinsman (on present-day Eastern Avenue) was donated to be used for the home. On November 11, 1865, the Iowa Soldiers' Orphans' Home received its first occupants by steamboat, when 150 children were delivered to matron Annie Wittenmyer's care. The residents kept a small farm and were also taught to farm by German-Danish immigrant Claus Einfeldt. On June 6, 1866, the home was taken over by the State of Iowa and Wittenmyer continued to oversee the home until 1867. Eventually, the Civil War orphans were grown and left the home. From 1870, the home began to accept children from all Iowa 99 counties.

The home was soon expanded and redesigned with small, home-like cottages replacing the barrack style dorms. Due partly to the redesign, no one was seriously injured in three fires that broke out in 1877, 1880 and 1887, and the home was able to continue operating, although several buildings were burned to the ground.

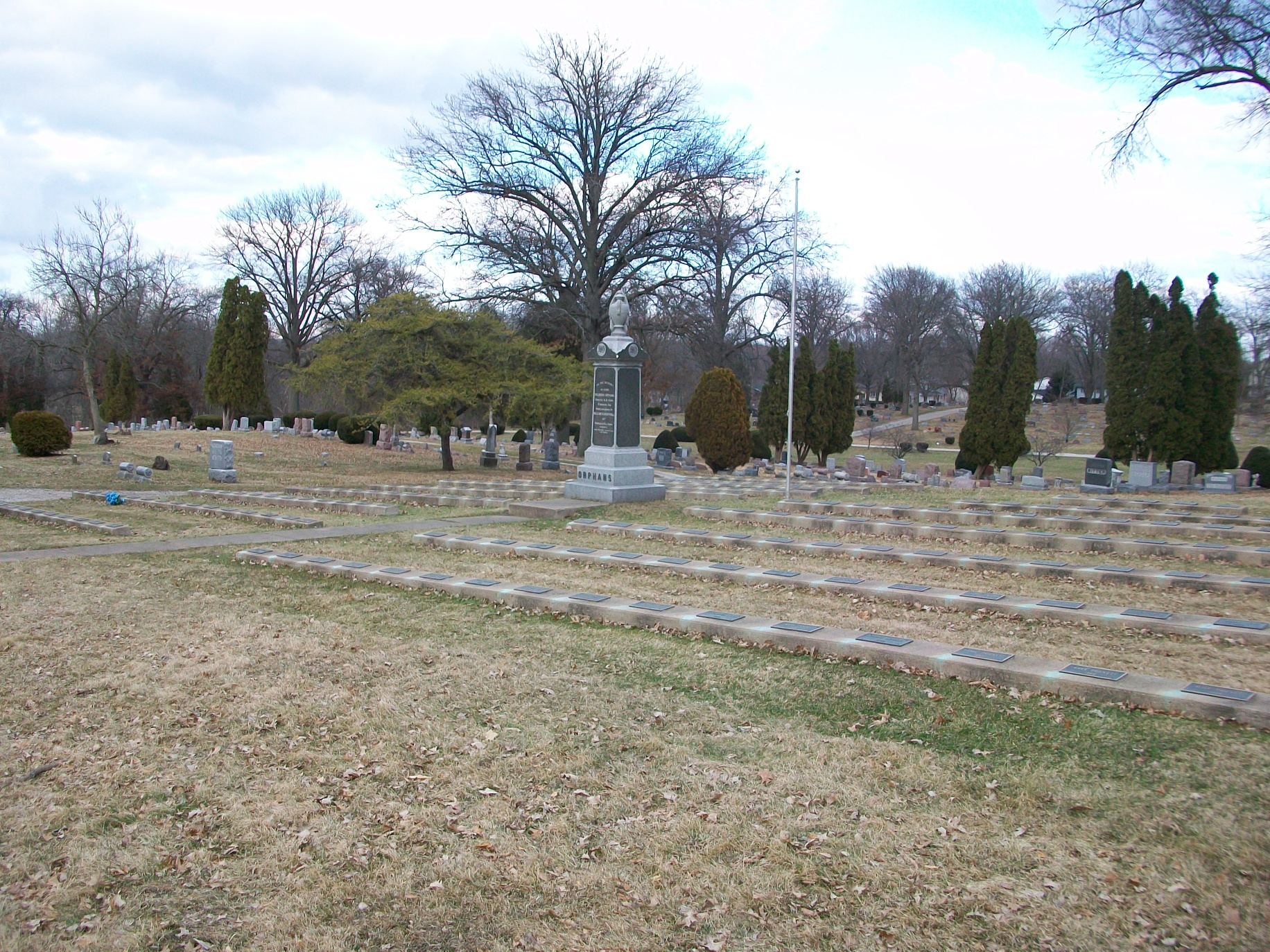
Graves of the orphans at the Oakdale Cemetery

In 1876, the Iowa State Legislature required that residents have employment before they left the home, and starting in sixth grade, students spent part of their school day learning a trade. In the interest of the residents, starting in 1890, the home was given custody of the children, so as to help place the children in good homes. The home functioned on its own and was also part of the community. The Orphans Band began marching in parades and gave concerts starting in the early 1900s. Future Major League Baseball player and evangelist Billy Sunday transferred from another orphanage to the home in 1872 when he was twelve, and future musician Wayne King entered the home in 1908 at the age of seven, though neither of them were actually orphans.

In 1949, the facility was renamed "The Annie Wittenmyer Home" by the Iowa General Assembly. In 1960, the focus of the home shifted from that of an orphanage to a residential special education and behavioral counseling facility. In 1975, the Wittenmyer Home closed, having helped an estimated 12,000 children and provided a century of service. From 1976 until November 2005, the Administration Building was used as a branch of the Davenport Public Library, until the new Fairmount Branch was opened in January 2006.

== Historic District ==
The historic district is made up of 34 resources, which includes 24 contributing buildings, two contributing sites, one contributing structure, six non-contributing buildings, and one non-contributing structure. It is located on the east side of the city to the south of Garfield Park and the Duck Creek Parkway, which are across East 29th Street. Oakdale Memorial Gardens, where the orphan's graves are located, is to the east across Eastern Avenue. The former right of way for the Chicago, Milwaukee, St. Paul and Pacific Railroad, now in use by the Canadian Pacific Railway, is to the west and south.

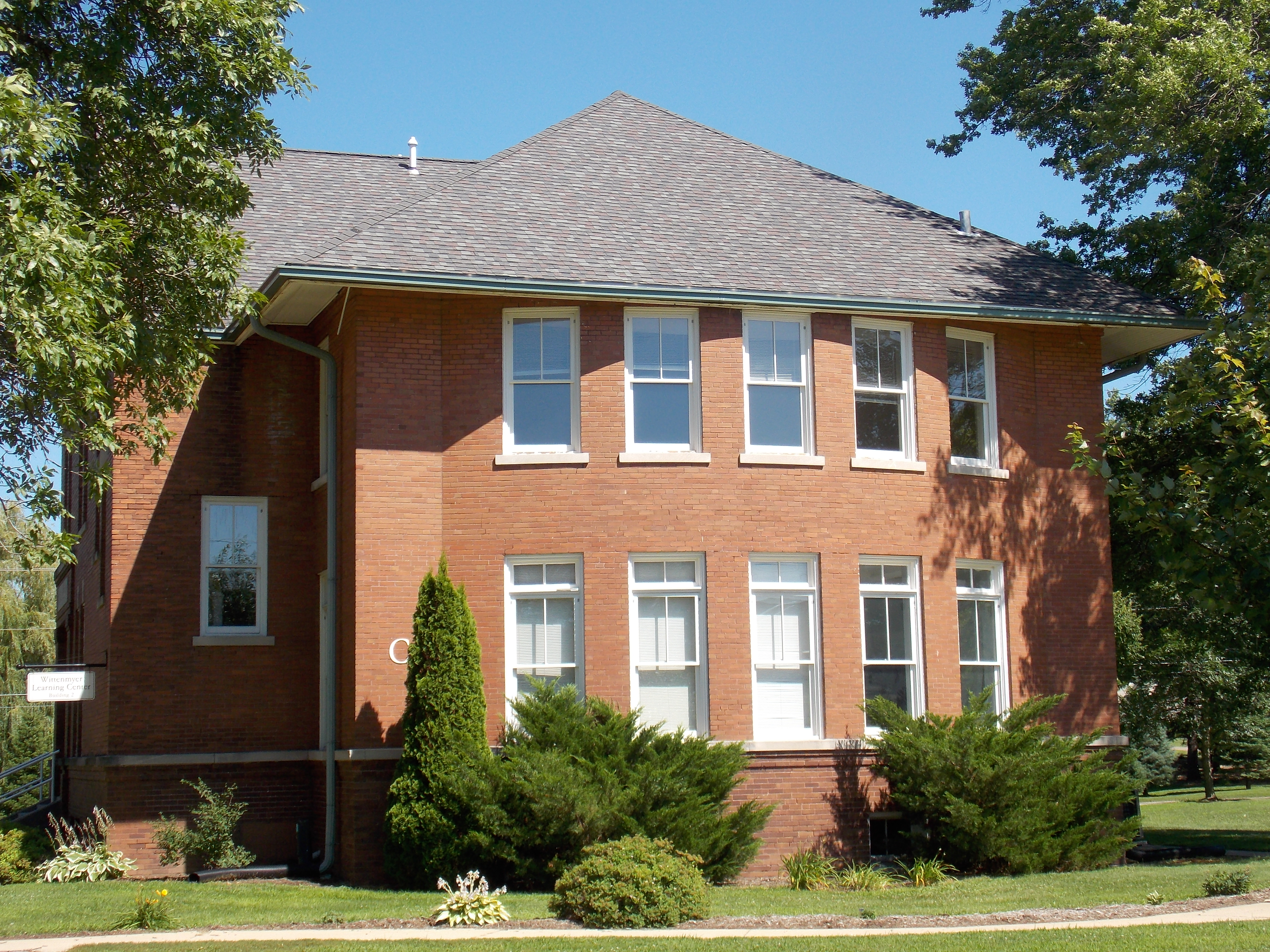
School Building

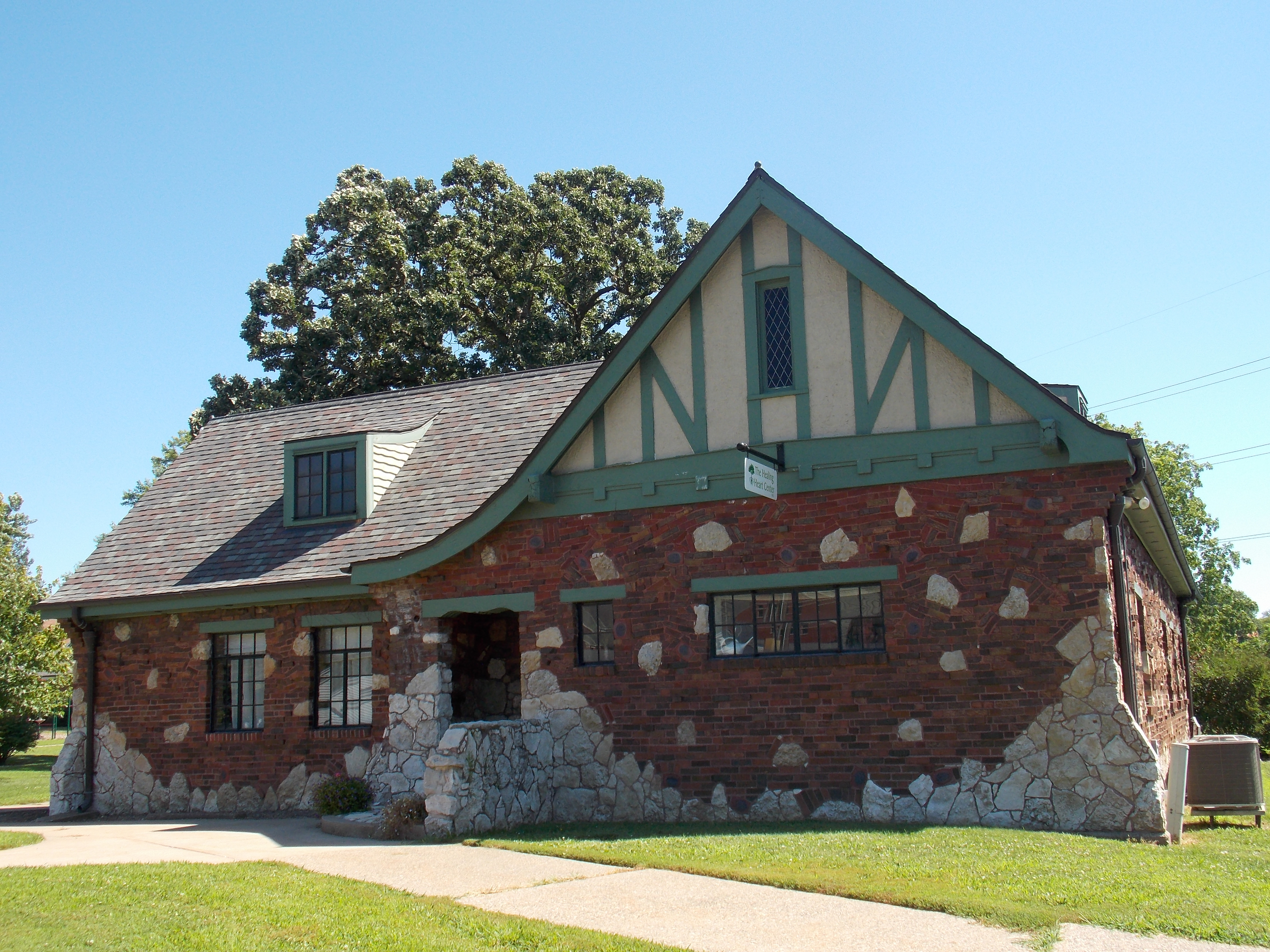
Preschool

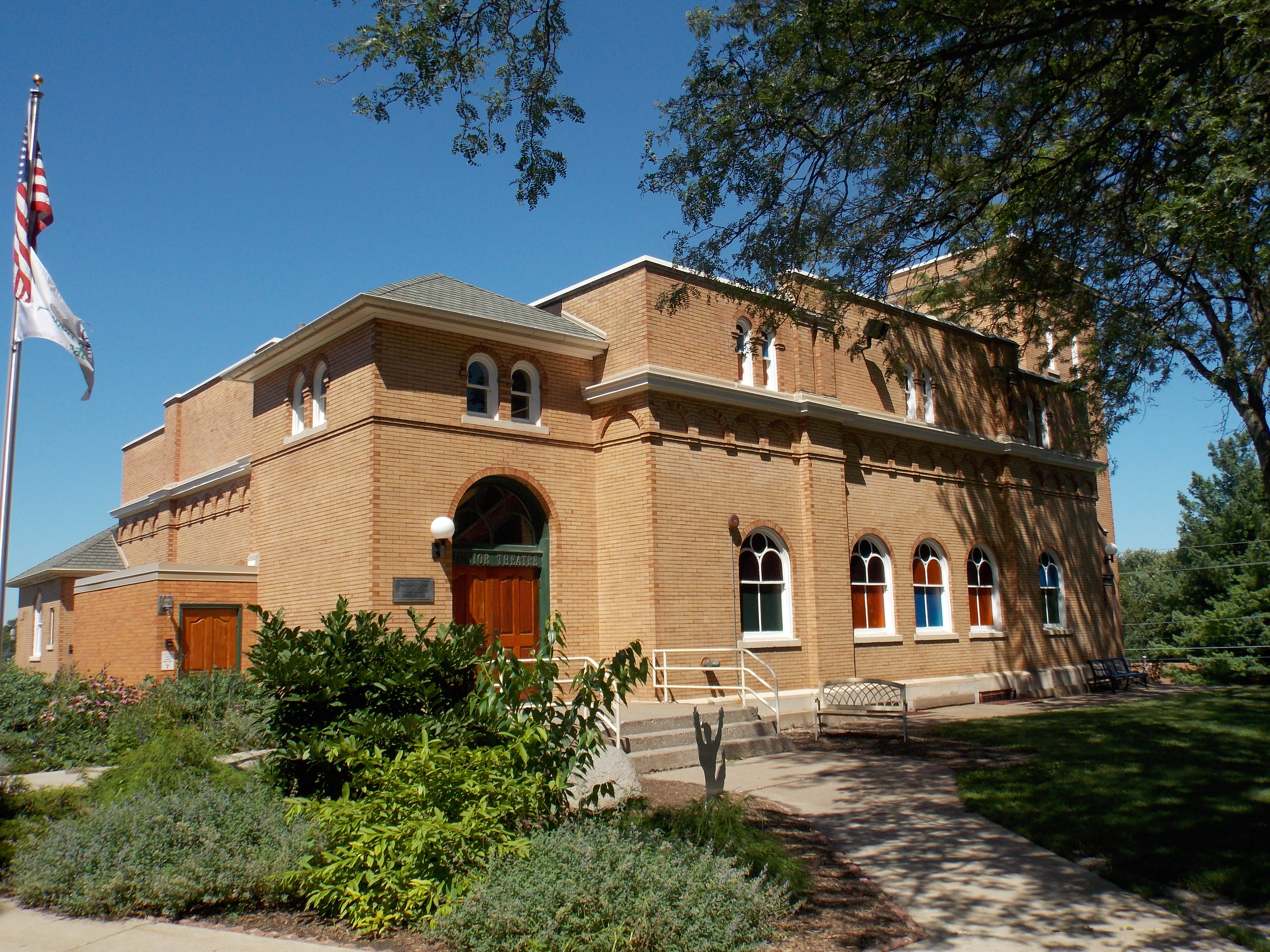
Chapel

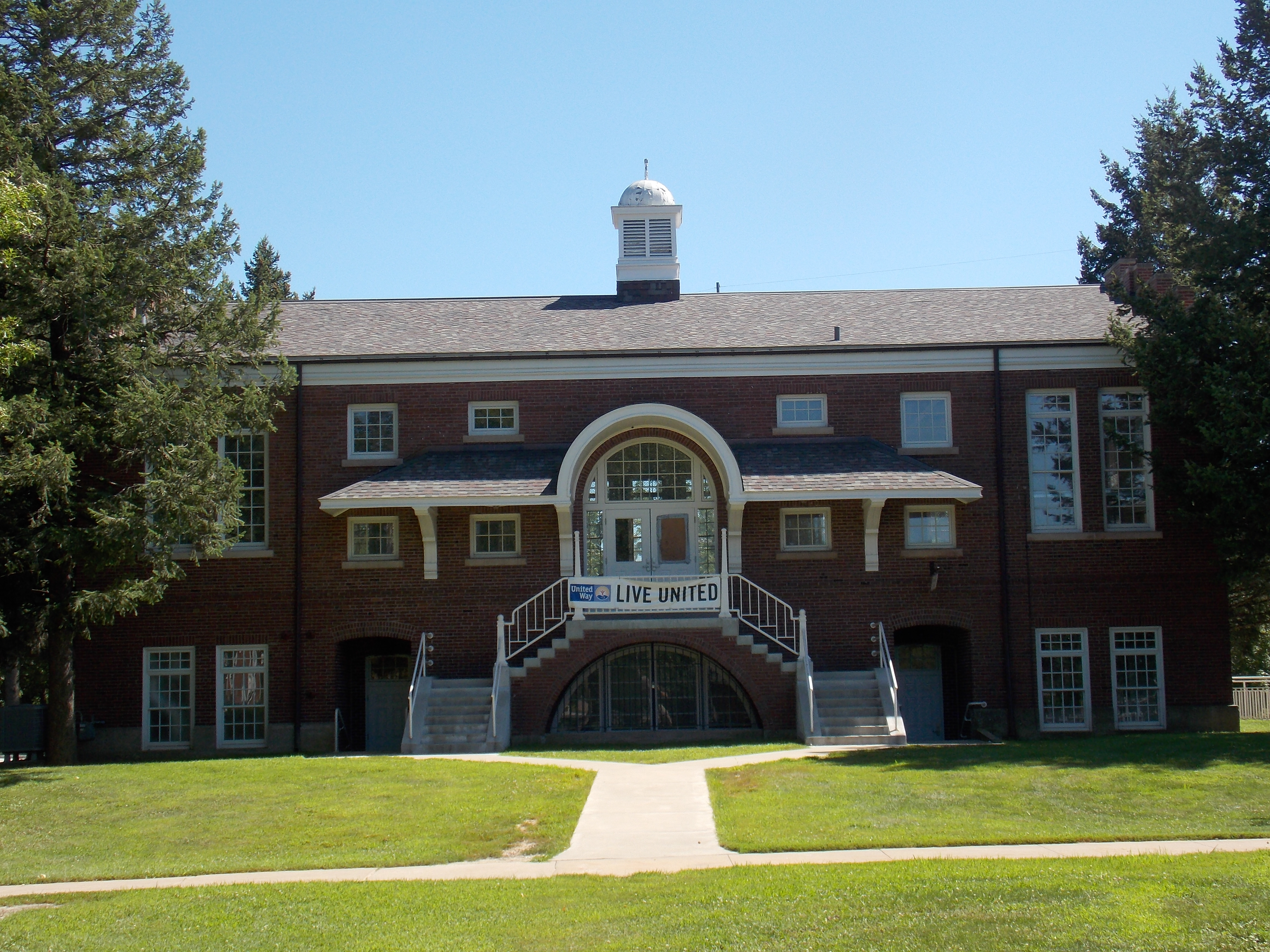
Gymnasium

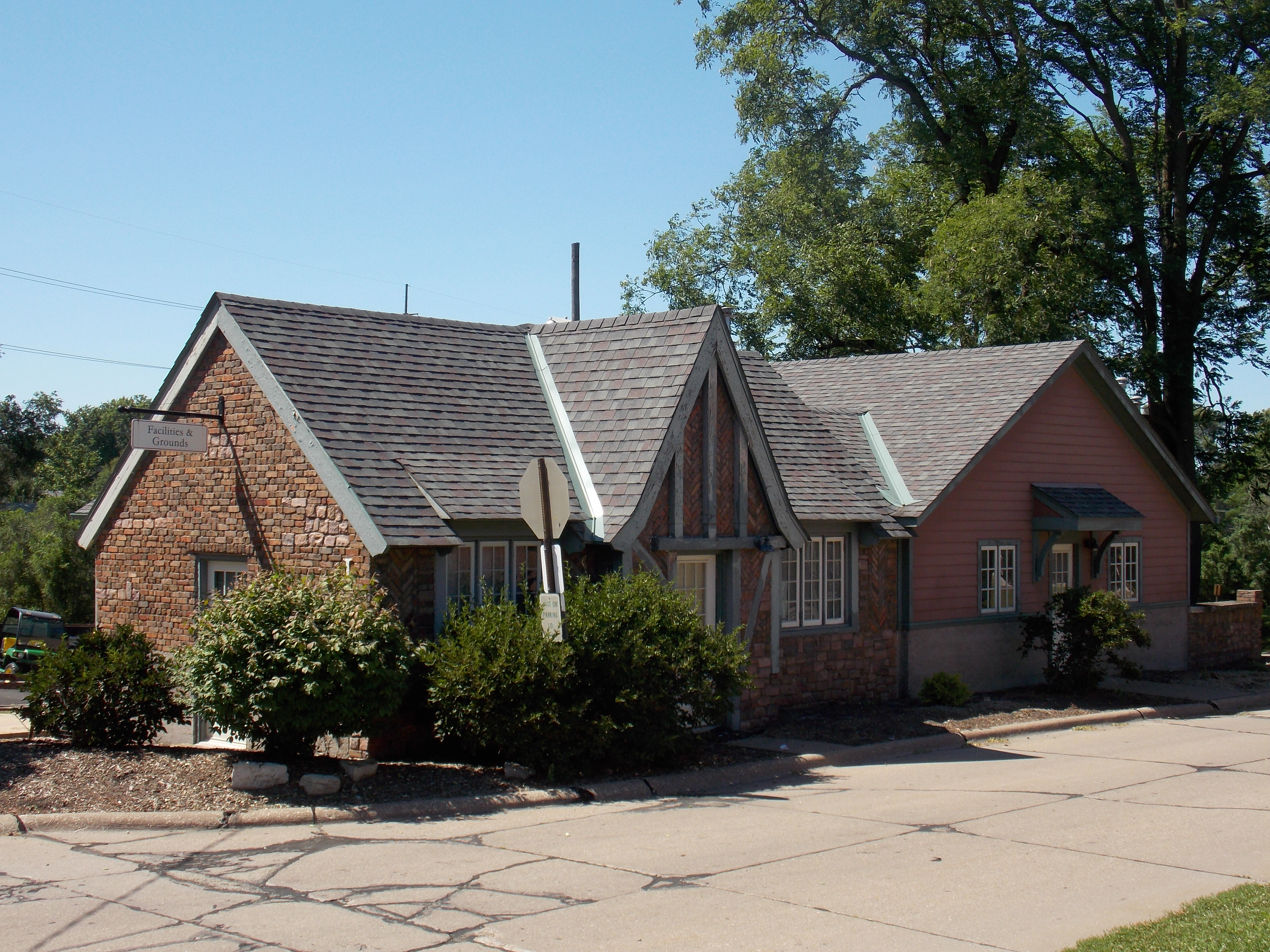
Greenhouse

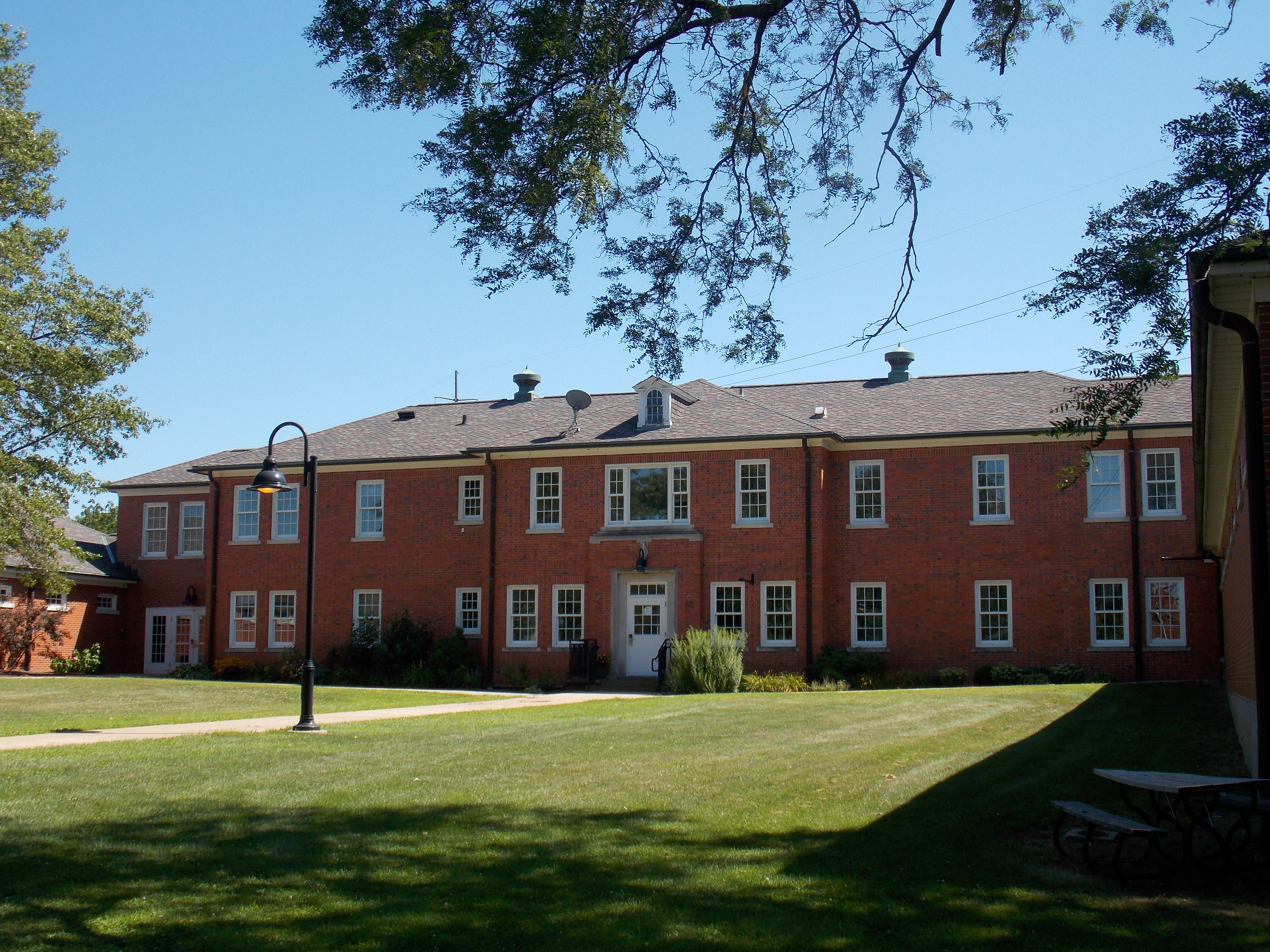
Hospital

== See also ==
- John P. Irish, trustee
