= Crescent Warehouse Historic District =

Historic district in Iowa, United States

- U.S. National Register of Historic Places
- U.S. Historic district
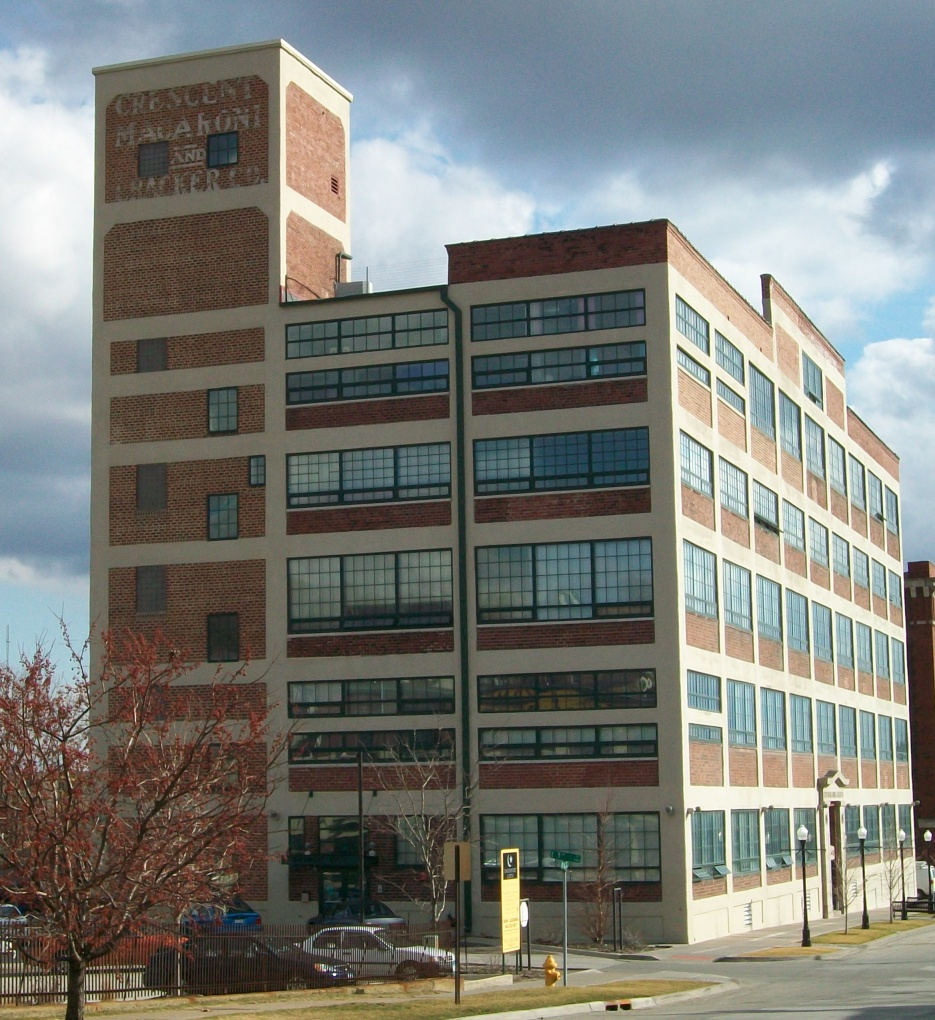
- The former Crescent Macaroni and Cracker Company, now luxury loft apartments

- Location within Iowa Location within the United States

- Location within city
- Location: portions of E. 4th St., E. 5th St., Iowa St. and Pershing Ave., Davenport, Iowa
- Coordinates: 41°31′34″N 90°34′9″W
- Area: 10.5 acres (4.2 ha)
- Architect: Clausen & Kruse; et al.
- Architectural style: Classical Revival, Modern Movement
- NRHP reference No.: 03001290
- Added to NRHP: December 18, 2003

The Crescent Warehouse Historic District is a 10.5-acre (4.2 ha) historic district in Downtown Davenport, Iowa, United States. The district is a collection of multi-story brick structures that formerly housed warehouses and factories. Most of the buildings have been converted into loft apartments. The district was listed on the National Register of Historic Places in 2003.

== Description ==
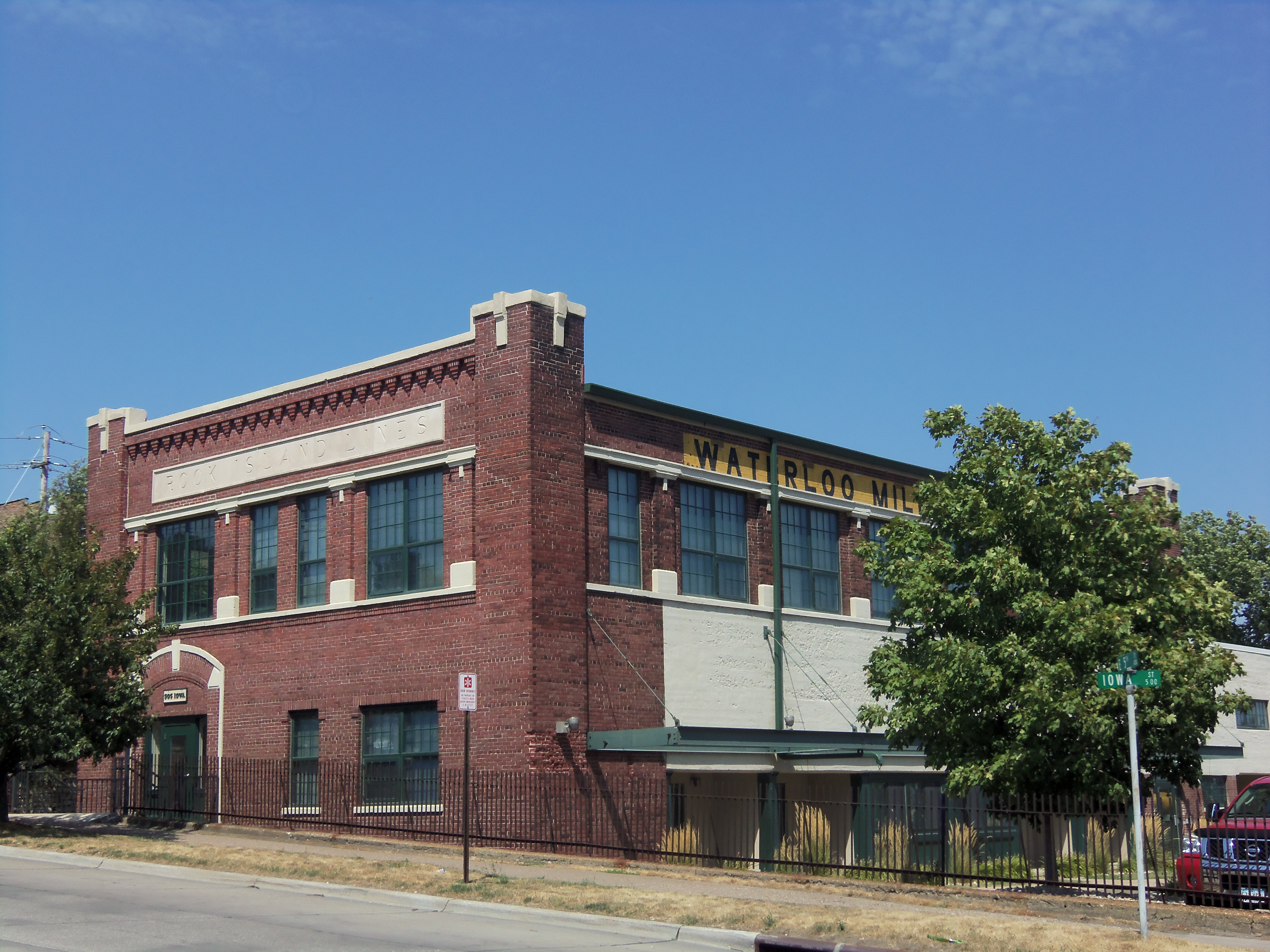
Chicago, Rock Island and Pacific Freighthouse

The district is associated with the commercial and industrial development that happened on the east side of the downtown area between 1900 and 1950. This was a transitional period for the city's economy as it moved from a lumber-based economy to a more diverse industrial and commercial base. During this time new factories, warehouses, and railroad buildings were constructed in the district. This collection of multi-story industrial-based buildings is rare within the state of Iowa.

The historic district is a roughly rectangular area with East Fourth Street on the south and East Fifth Street on the north, Iowa Street on the east and Pershing on the west. The southwest corner of the district widens to include the railroad viaduct over the intersection of East Fourth Street and Pershing Avenue. The area was located between two “crescents” that were created by elevated railroad tracks. The tracks that remain are the former mainline of the Chicago, Rock Island and Pacific Railroad and now belong to the Iowa Interstate Railroad. The second crescent was created by a branch of the tracks from the mainline to the Rock Island's railroad yards north of East Fourth Street. The second crescent and the yards have subsequently been removed. At the time of its nomination, the district consisted of 16 resources, which included 14 contributing buildings and two contributing structures.

== History ==
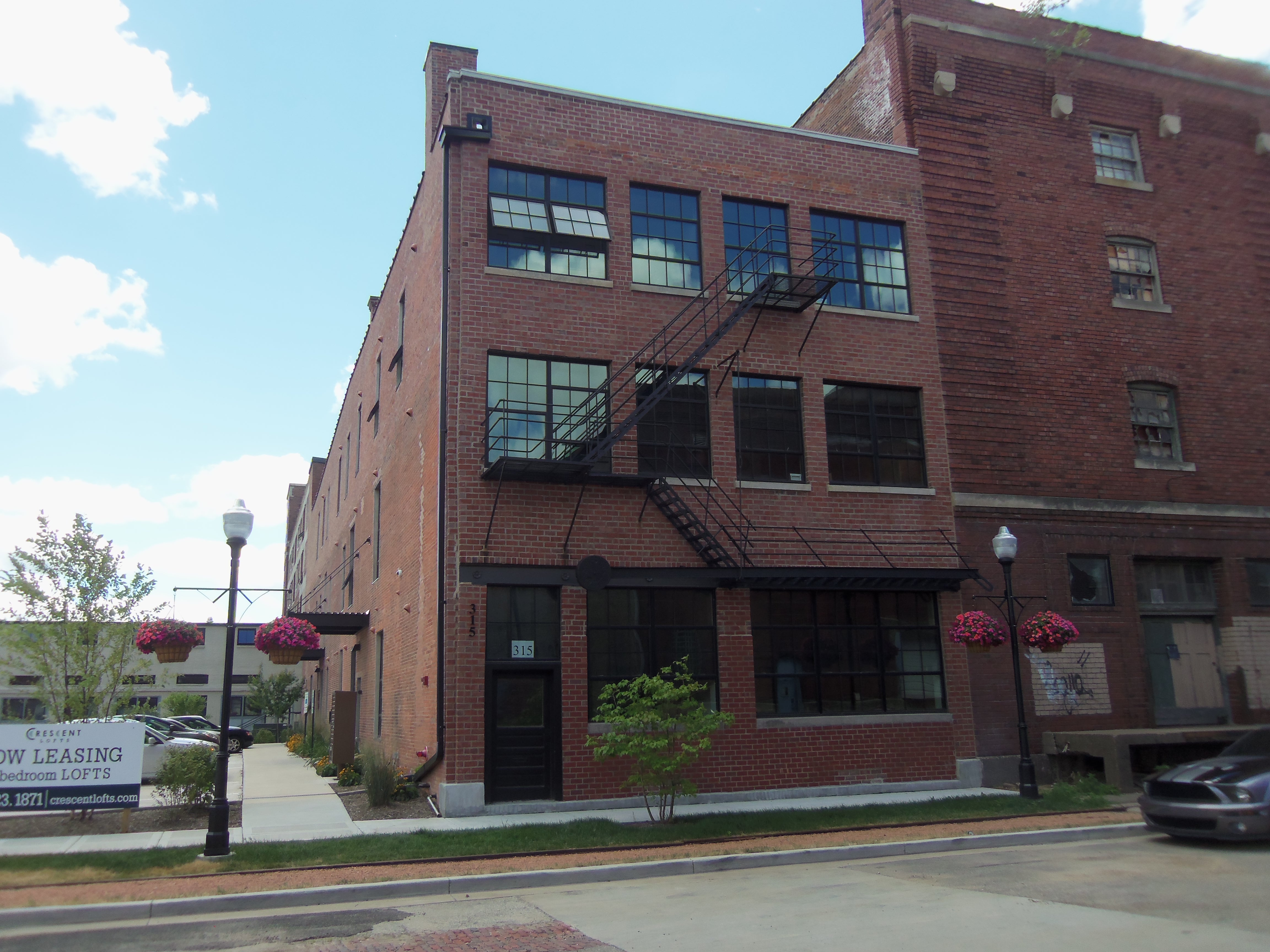
Kerker Paper Box Company

The Crescent Warehouse Historic District is located in what is known as LeClaire's Fourth, Fifth, and Sixth Additions to the original city of Davenport, which lies to the west. The additions were part of a square mile plot of land given to city founder Antoine LeClaire by the Native American tribes who inhabited the region before American expansion into what is now the state of Iowa. That plot of land is known as the LeClaire Reserve. The city was founded in 1836 and its early economy was based on serving the settlers who moved to and through the area. The main business interests included flour mills, foundries, sawmills, and other small-scale manufacturers. In the 1850s the economy increasingly became based on woodworking operations. Logs from the pine forests in Minnesota and Wisconsin were floated down the Mississippi River and processed in mills along the riverfront. Other businesses such as planning mills, barrel factories, furniture factories, cigar box factories, and ladder factories joined the sawmills. Many were located along the Mississippi River and the Chicago, Milwaukee, St. Paul and Pacific Railroad tracks in the decades immediately before and after the Civil War.

=== Rock Island Railroad ===
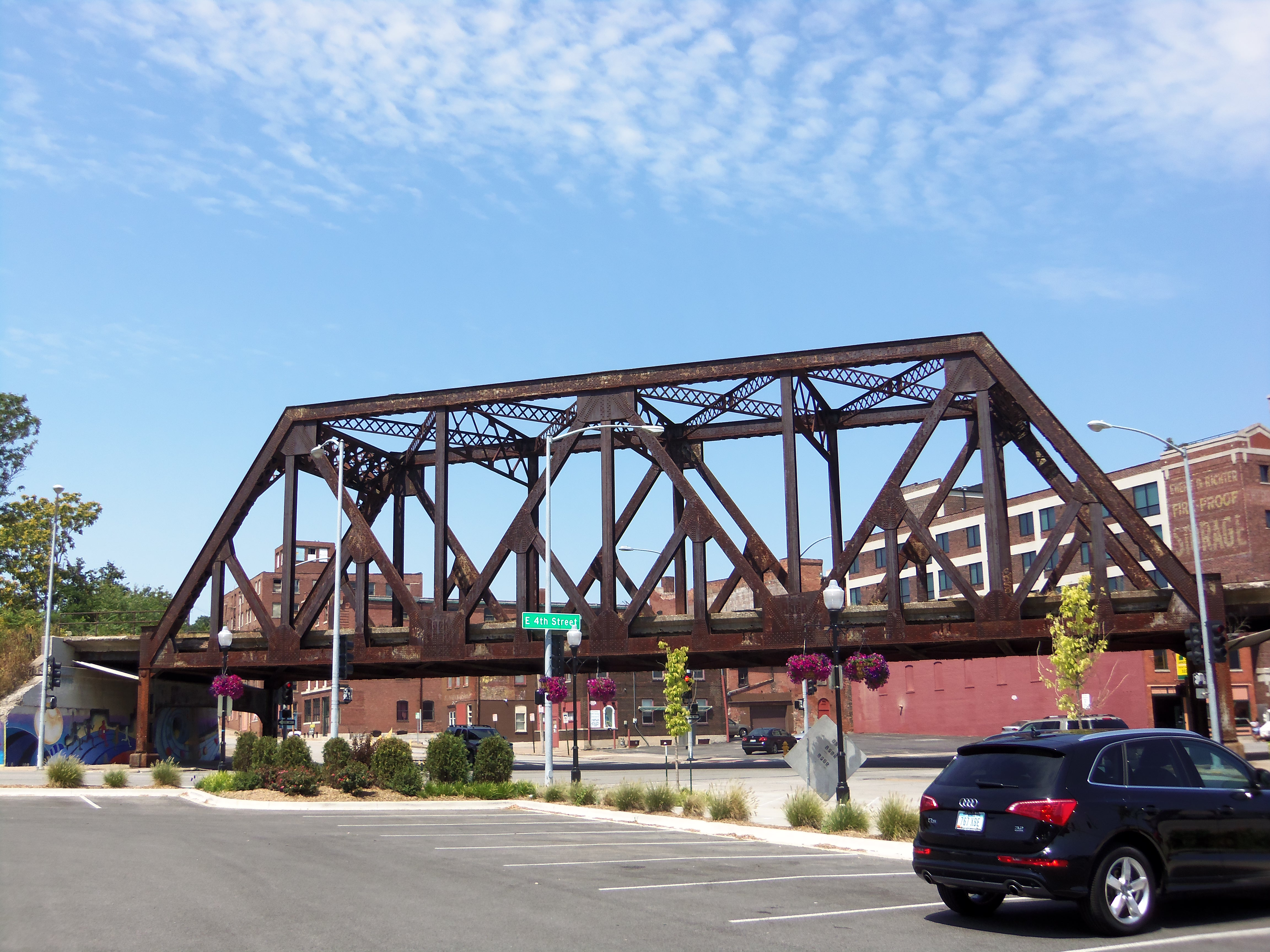
Railroad bridge over the intersection of East Fourth St. and Pershing Ave.

The area that would become the Crescent Warehouse Historic District was sparsely developed through the 1870s. In 1872 a new double-deck wagon and railroad bridge was built at the foot of Iowa Street across the Mississippi River. The new mainline of the Rock Island Railroad spurred development in the area. They built a new rail yard between Iowa Street and Front Street (now East River Drive) in the 1880s. Car repair shops and a roundhouse were begun in 1887. The woodworking industries hit their peak in the mid-1890s and as other industries moved into the area, the land around the Rock Island Railroad's mainline became more desirable. Also, after the decline in the woodworking industries the riverfront property in the downtown area where some of the mills were located became LeClaire Park in the early 20th century. The riverfront property on the east side of town reverted to other industries, especially after a disastrous fire in the wood yards near the Village of East Davenport.

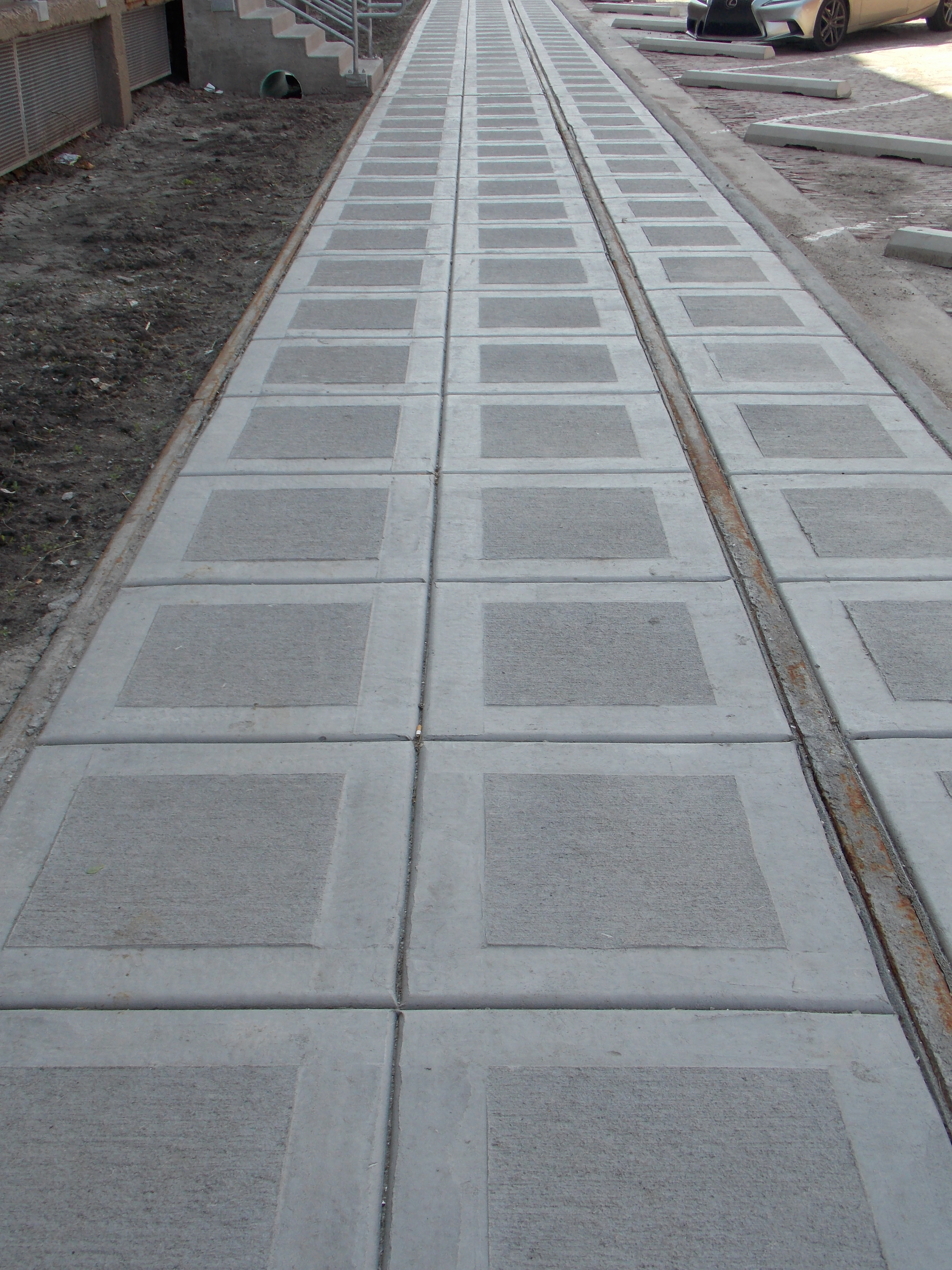
Rail sidings embedded in the sidewalk along East Fifth Street

In the early 1890s, the eastern portion of the district was home to a few small-scale manufacturing facilities for the Crescent Mills, the Davenport Oatmeal Company, and the Reupke, Schmidt & Company Steam Bakery. West of Iowa Street was found small warehouses, small frame houses, larger rooming houses, a tavern, a lumber yard and the former location of Trinity Episcopal Church.

The present Government Bridge was completed in 1895 on the piers of the 1872 bridge. The first level of the bridge was equipped to carry electric streetcars as well as other modes of transportation. The upper level continued to carry the Rock Island Railroad. In 1901 and 1902 the railroad right of way was elevated through the downtown area. Four tracks were placed on most of the elevated rail bed to accommodate the 70 passenger trains that passed through the city. A new passenger station was built three blocks to the west of Rock Island Avenue (the present Pershing Avenue). While not in the historic district it proved convenient for the traveling salesmen employed by the businesses that would make the district its home. At the same time that the mainline was being elevated rail sidings were being laid in the streets and alleys of the district to serve warehouse and factory customers. The infrastructure for the railroad was completed by 1910. At the same time, the Rock Island Railroad consolidated their old shops elsewhere and built a new freight station in response to the expanded need for rail freight.

=== Factories and Warehouses ===
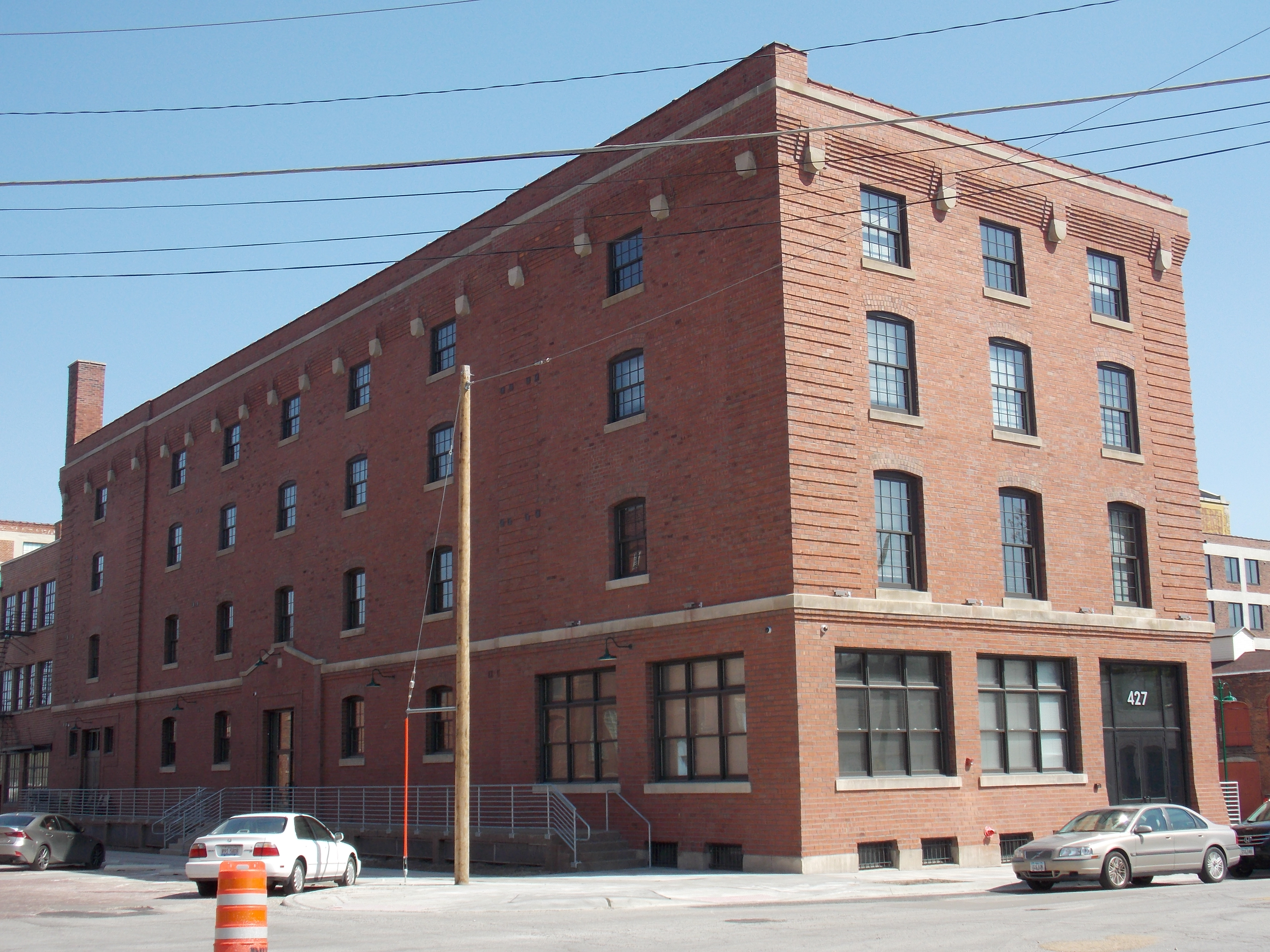
Smith Brothers and Burdick Company building

At the same time, the Rock Island Railroad expanded, Davenport's population began to expand. At the turn of the 20th century the city's population stood at 35,254 and by 1910 it rose to 43,028. Another 13,000 were added by 1920 and the population total stood at 56,727. In response, the commercial and industrial operations in the city expanded as well. Many of the smaller firms in the city consolidated and so the number of business actually declined during this period as the number of wage earners increased. These larger firms saw an increase in earnings from $12 million in 1900 to $50 million in 1920.

The western and southern sections of the district were transformed from a largely residential area to a mix of factory and warehouse buildings. Six such buildings were constructed between 1900 and 1910 with another six buildings built the following decade. By 1901 the Davenport Paper Box Company and the Kerker Paper Box Company were among the first businesses to build new structures in the district. They were followed by the Sieg Iron Company warehouse (1905), a heavy hardware distributor, and grocery distributor Smith Brothers and Burdick Company (1905). The later building was built on the property vacated by Trinity Church. The Halligan Coffee Company built a new office and warehouse building in 1907 at the corner of East Fourth and Iowa Streets. The freight building was the sixth building built in that decade.

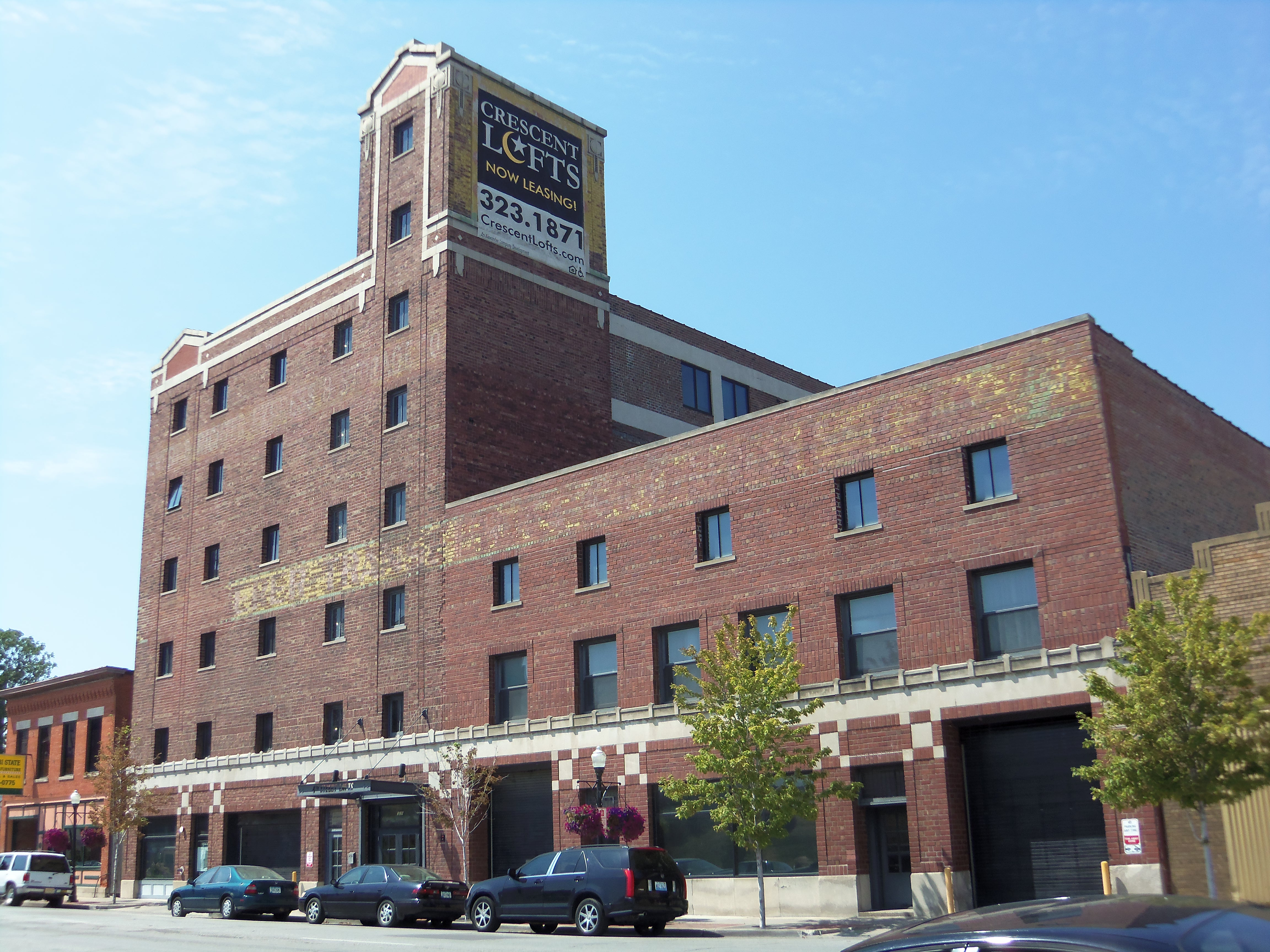
Ewert and Richter Express and Storage Co. warehouses on East Fourth Street

In 1911 the Preston, Sickles and Nutting Company, a wholesale hardware company, started construction of a six-story building on the northeast corner of Rock Island and East Fifth Streets. On January 25, 1915, the Crescent Macaroni and Cracker Company building on Iowa Street was destroyed in a fire. The building had been built as the original Burtis House Hotel. They replaced their factory with a new building that was completed within 18 months. At the same time across Iowa Street, the Sieg Company was expanding and built a new office building. The same year the Ewert and Richter Express and Storage Company, which already had a four-story building on East Fourth Street, was building a new six-story addition next door. The older building was destroyed in a fire on February 8, 1933. That same year a new three-story building, designed to match the 1915 building, was designed and constructed.

The Great Depression saw a decline in the local economy. Davenport, however, continued to be an important regional jobbing center with 62.6 percent of the bi-state wholesale business headquartered in the city. The wholesale businesses contributed $50 million to the local economy in 1940. After World War II the Crescent Macaroni and Cracker Company, Halligan Coffee Company, Smith Brothers and Burdick Company, Sieg Company, Marbury Coats factory, General Electric Company distributorship, Schlegel Drug Stores wholesale division, Buhrer Brokerage Company food brokers, and Frank Lewis Company food brokers were all headquartered in the district. The last building built in the Crescent Warehouse Historic District was an automobile showroom for Vincent J. Neu Oldsmobile in 1950. The single-story building on the northwest corner of East Fourth and Iowa Streets housed the dealership for only nine years when the dealership's rapid growth forced it to move outside the central business district.

=== Loft Apartments ===
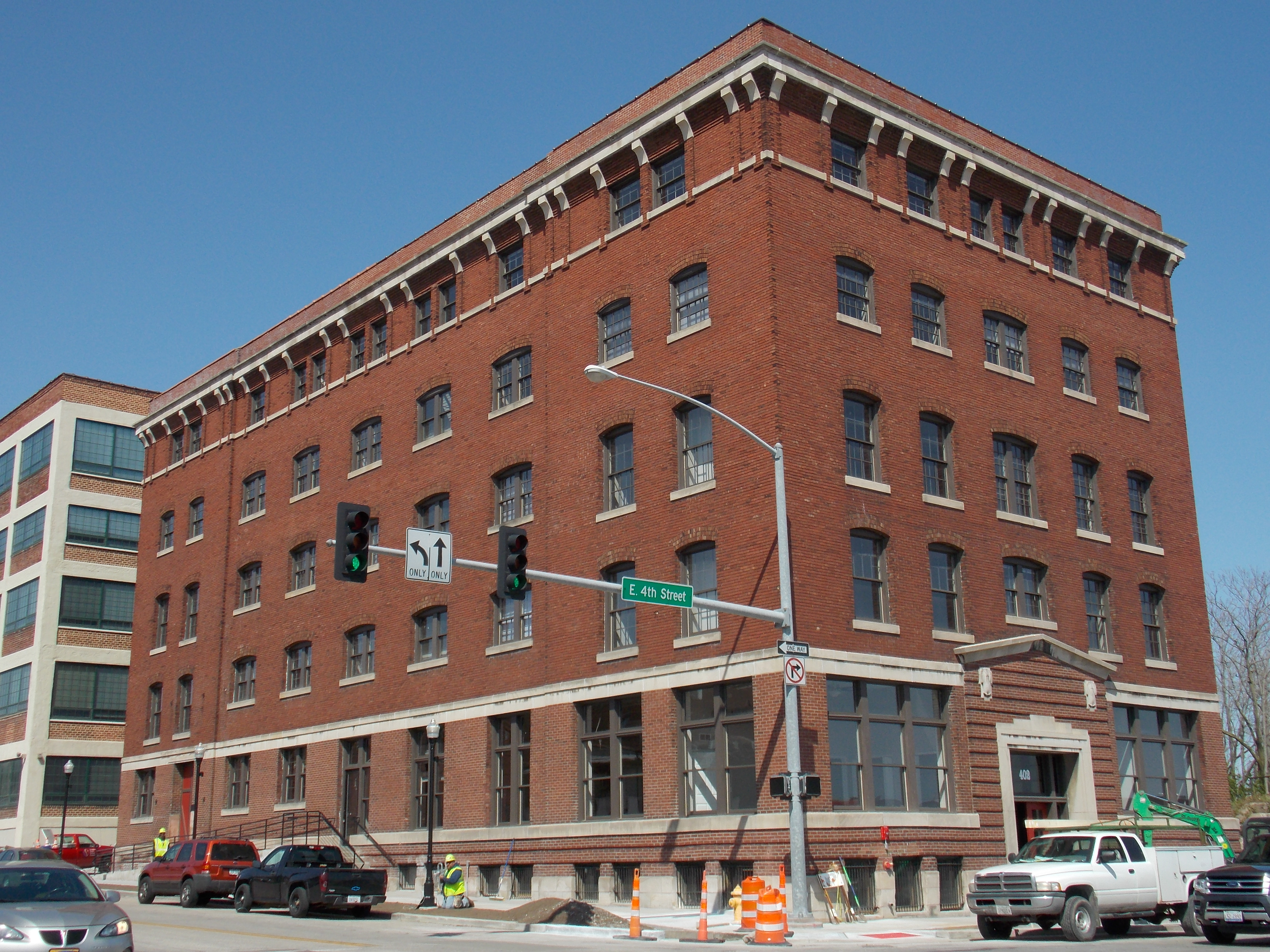
Halligan Coffee Co. Lofts

The buildings in the district continued to house a variety of businesses over the years. Although its ownership changed several times, the Crescent Macaroni and Cracker Company remained in operation until 1991. In 2003 The Alexander Company of Madison, Wisconsin started the process of converting several of the structures into loft apartment buildings. The Crescent building and the former Rock Island freight house (also known as the Waterloo Mills building) were converted into 73 units in 2005 and are now known as the Davenport Lofts. The Ewert and Richter warehouse buildings became a 56 unit complex that was completed in 2007 and is now known as 4th Street Lofts. The Kerker building was converted into 18 units in 2012 and is called the Kerker Lofts. That same year Restoration St. Louis, who had already renovated the Hotel Blackhawk and the Forrest Block in downtown Davenport, bought the Smith Brothers and Burdick Company building to convert into loft apartments, which opened in January 2015 as the Market Lofts with 37 units. In 2014 the Alexander Company converted the Sieg Iron building on Iowa Street into a 33 unit apartment building. Y & J Properties completed a $6.5 million renovation of the Halligan Coffee Company building into 45 market-rate lofts in April 2015. The following month the Crescent Electric Company building and the Sieg Iron Company building, contiguous buildings on East Fifth Street, received $3.1 million in historic tax credits from the state of Iowa. They are the last two buildings in the district to be renovated. Renovations to the buildings were completed in the spring of 2018 and the 62 units opened as the Pershing Hill Lofts.

== Architecture ==
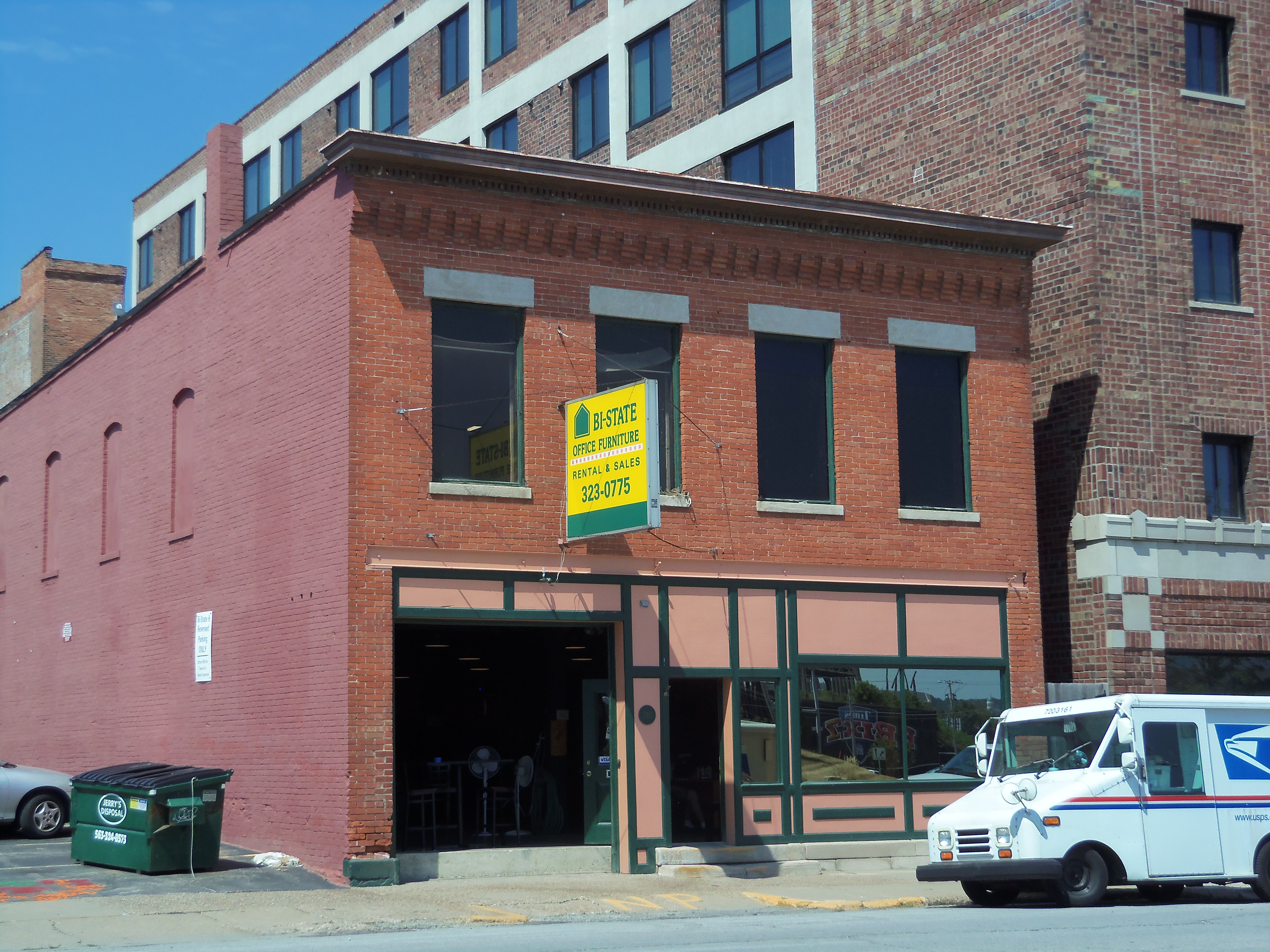
Davenport Paper Box Co. building

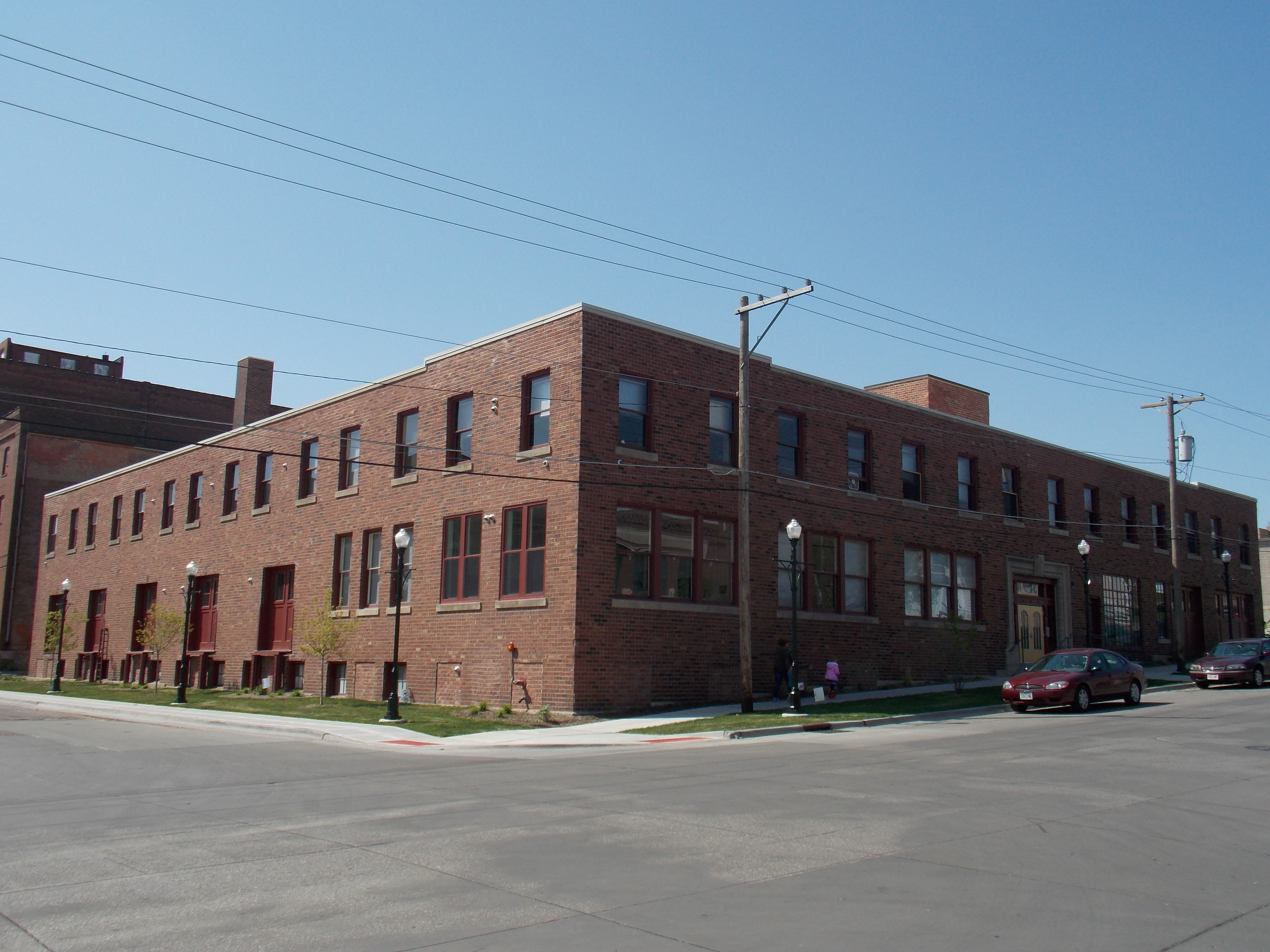
The second Sieg Iron Company building

The buildings in the district include multi-story wholesale and transfer warehouses, large and small-scale multi-story factories, and small-scale mixed-use buildings. Some of Davenport's most prominent architectural firms contributed buildings. Most of the buildings were built in the Vernacular commercial style. These structures feature segmental brick window arches, stone lintels, and brick corbelling along the cornice line. The first Sieg Iron Company building at 312 East Fifth Street and the Davenport Paper Box Company building at 310 East Fourth Street exemplify this style. The Smith Brothers and Burdick Company building at 427 Pershing Avenue and the Halligan Coffee Company building at 402 East Fourth Street were designed in the Neoclassical style. They were the product of Temple, Burrows, and McLane. Both buildings have a main floor and a cornice that are set off by stone and metal Classical ornamentation. In between is a multi-story shaft that contains segmental and flat-arched windows. The Sickles, Preston and Nutting Company building at 511 Pershing Avenue and the second Sieg Iron Company building at 500 Iowa Street were designed by Davenport architect Arthur Ebeling. They are typical of his style which features simple, functional buildings with minimal ornamentation and practical floor plans. The Davenport architectural firm of Clausen & Kruse contributed the Crescent Macaroni and Cracker Company building at 427 Iowa Street and both Ewert and Richter Transfer and Storage Company buildings at 320 East Fourth Street.

The two railroad-related structures in the Crescent Warehouse Historic District include the railroad bridge over the intersection of East Fourth Street and Pershing Avenue and the remaining section of the rail bed. The bridge is a Warren through-truss bridge. There is a similar span over the intersection of East Third and Iowa Streets in the Davenport Motor Row and Industrial Historic District. The second contributing structure is approximately 200 feet (61 m) of the second elevated crescent-shaped rail bed. It lies to the north of East Fourth Street in the southeast corner of the district. The rest of the berm and the bridge that spanned Fourth Street were removed in the 1970s. The original stone bridge abutments on the north side of Fourth Street remain in a deteriorated condition and without the facing stone.
