= John W. Ross (Iowa architect) =

American architect

John Wesley Ross (June 18, 1830 – June 20, 1914) was an architect in Davenport, Iowa. Originally of Westfield, Massachusetts, Ross moved to Davenport in 1874 where he designed several prominent structures. His son, Albert Randolph Ross, was a draughtsman in John W. Ross's office during 1884–7, and became a notable architect in his own right. Ross designed several buildings that are listed on the National Register of Historic Places (NRHP).

== Works ==
His works include:

- Davenport City Hall, 226 W. 4th St. Davenport, Iowa, built in 1895, Richardsonian Romanesque, NRHP-listed for its "association with the history of city government" and for its architecture "as an important, and increasingly rare, expression of the Richardsonian Romanesque style."
- Nicholas J. Kuhnen House, 702 Perry St., Davenport, Iowa, Italianate, NRHP-listed for its architecture
- Iowa Soldiers' Orphans' Home, 2800 Eastern Ave., Davenport, Iowa, including Classical Revival, Queen Anne, and "English Period Cottage" architecture, NRHP-listed for its architecture
- Hose Station No. 1, 117 Perry Street, Davenport, Iowa, an Italianate structure, NRHP-listed for its association with firefighting in Davenport and for its architecture "as an example of the Late Victorian Italianate in public works construction"
- South Side School, 209 S. College Ave., Geneseo, Illinois, built in 1889, a Romanesque structure, NRHP-listed in 1975.
- J. Schricker Mausoleum, Oakdale Memorial Gardens, 2501 Eastern Ave., Davenport, Iowa, built in 1899, a Neoclassical structure, a contributing building in Oakdale Cemetery Historic District, NRHP-listed in 2015.
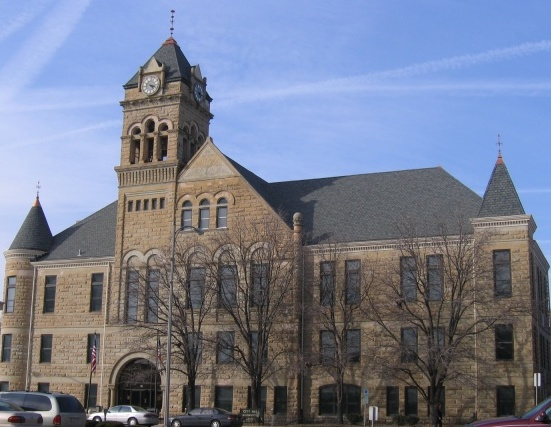
Davenport City Hall

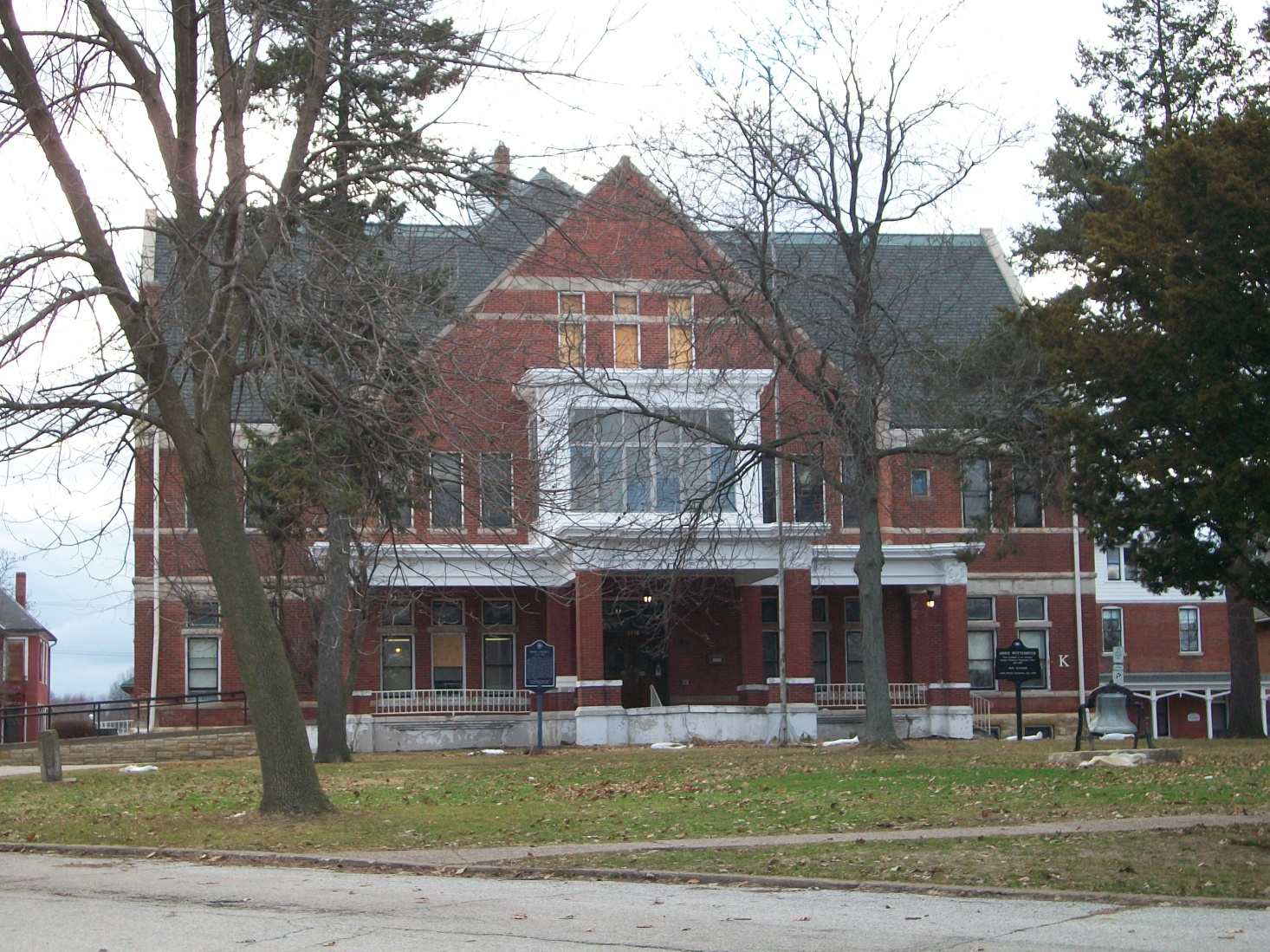
Iowa Soldiers' Orphans' Home

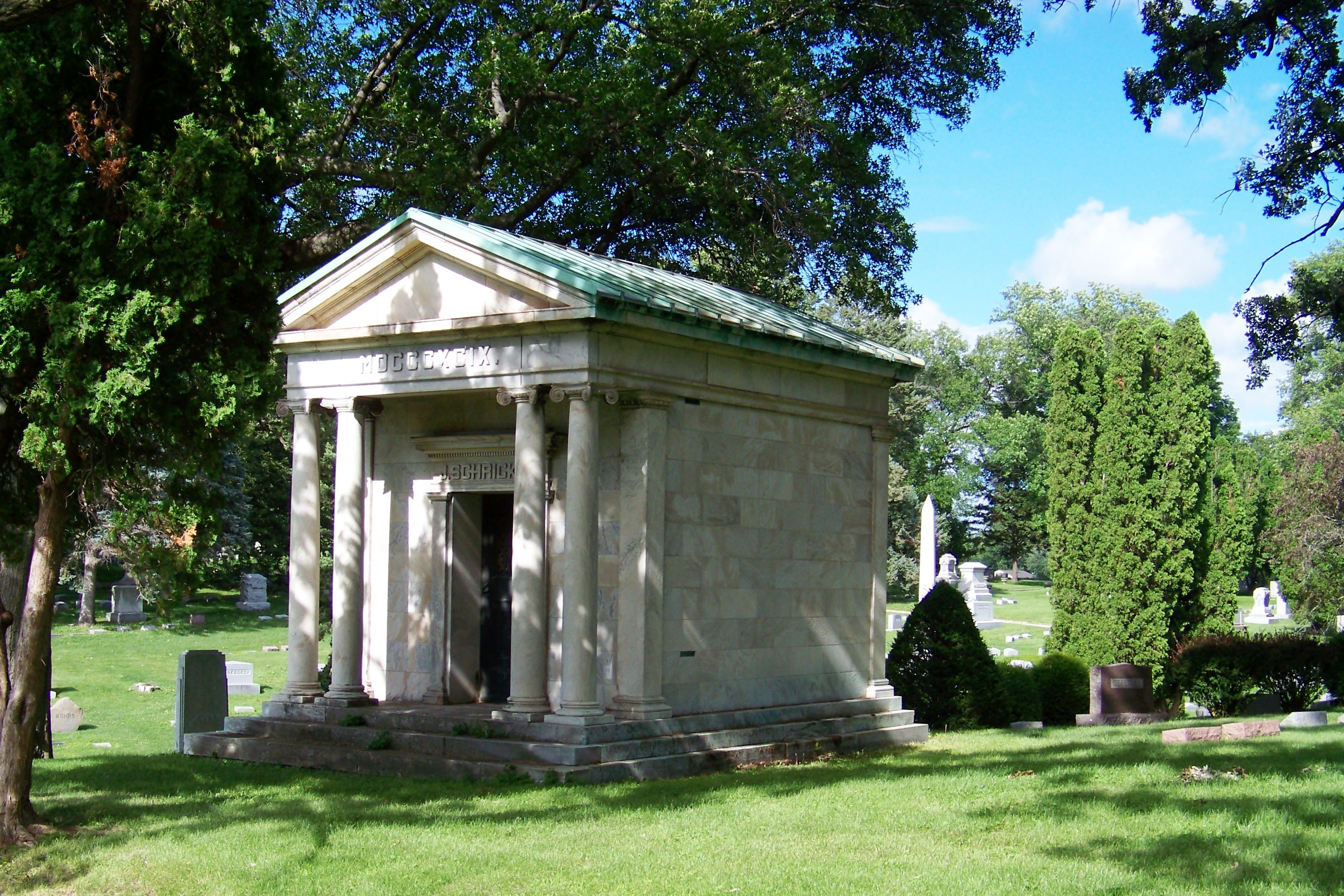
J. Schricker mausoleum at Oakdale Memorial Gardens

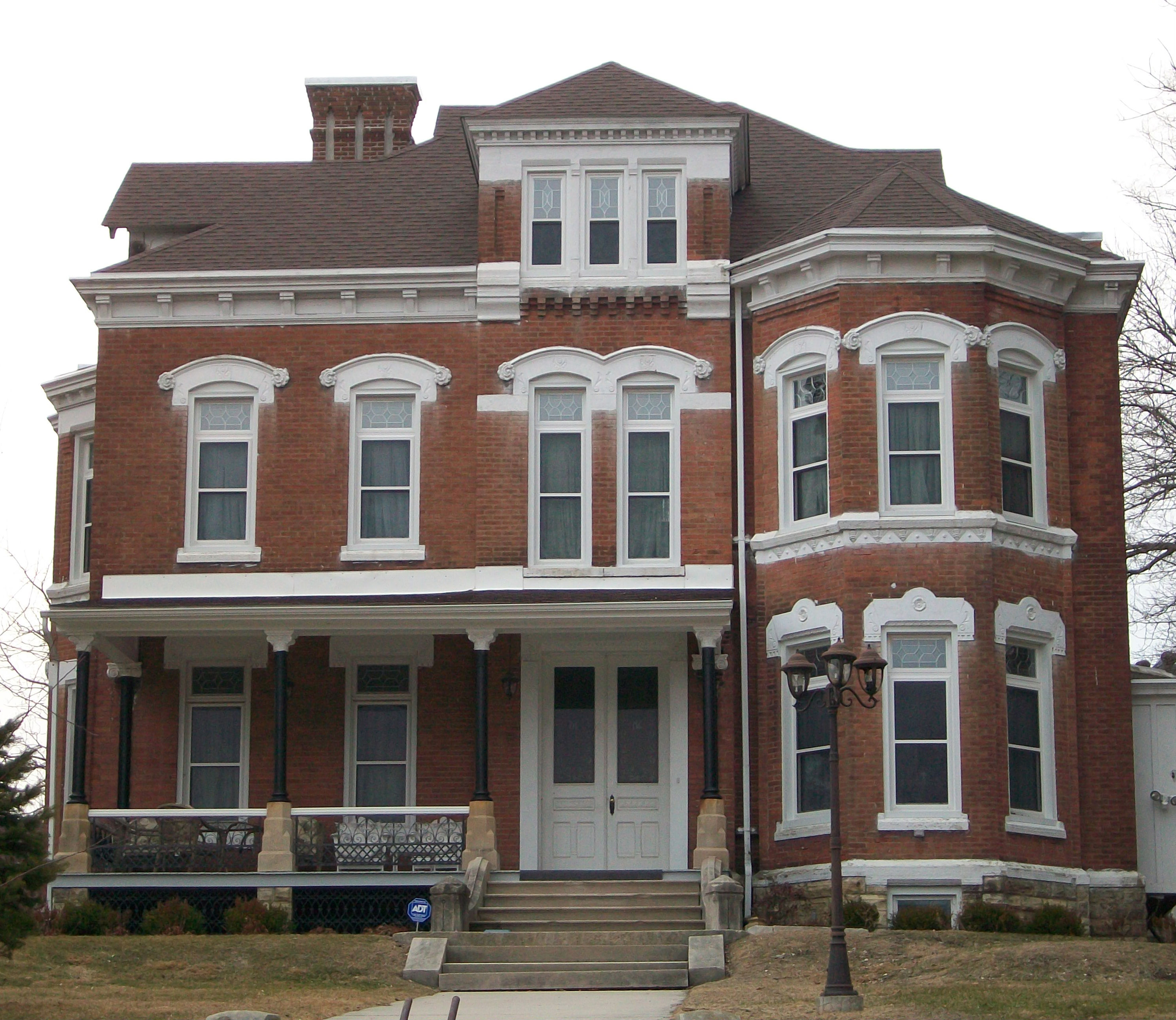
Nicholas J. Kuhnen House

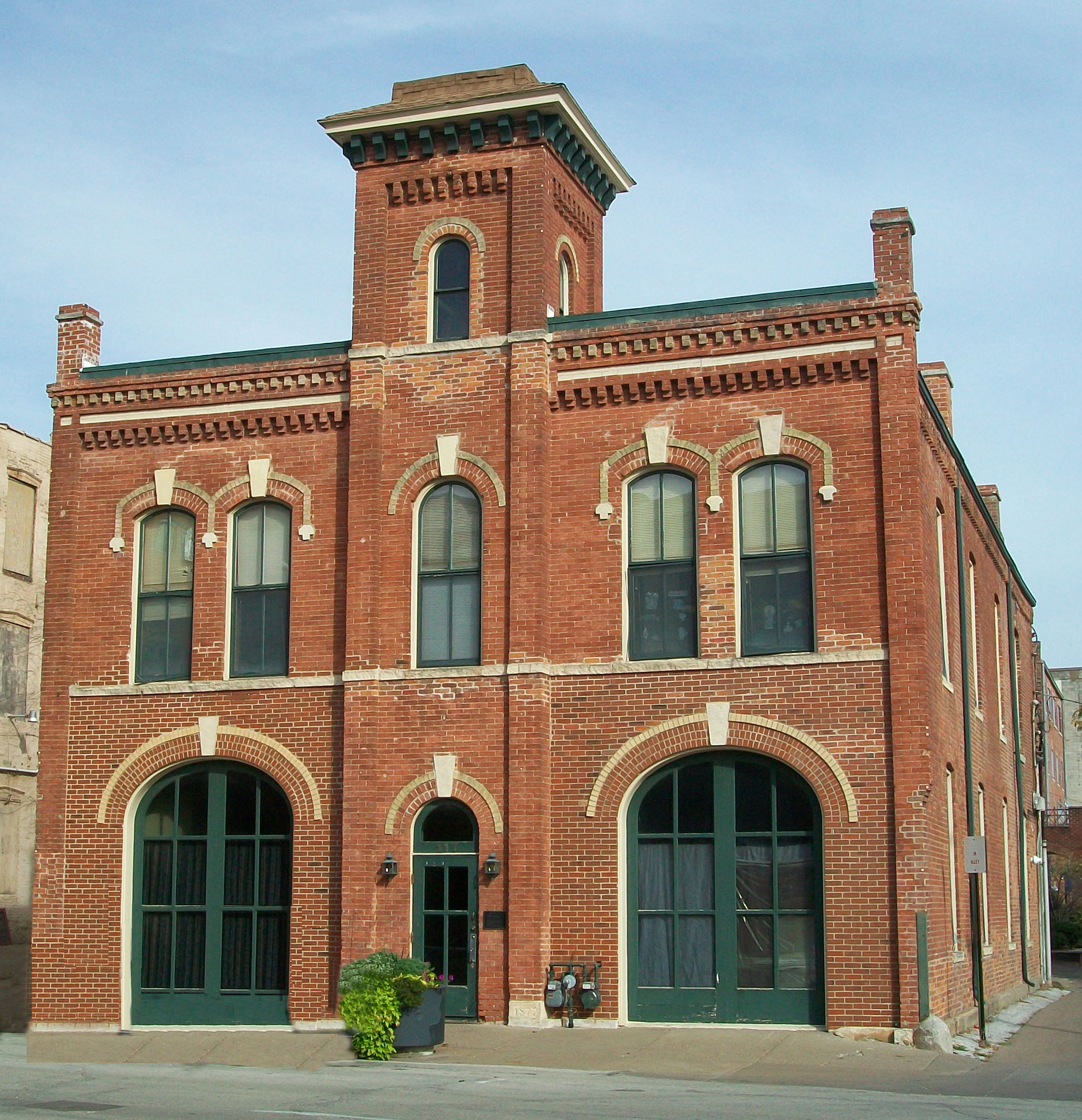
Hose Station No. 1

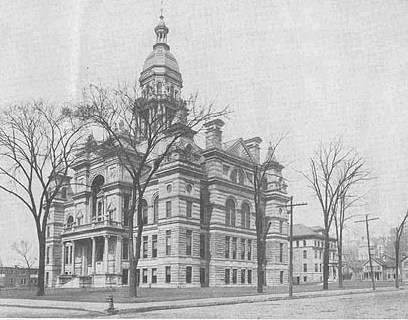
Scott County Courthouse (1886-1888)
