= Hose Station No. 1 =

- U.S. National Register of Historic Places
- U.S. Historic district – Contributing property
- Davenport Register of Historic Properties
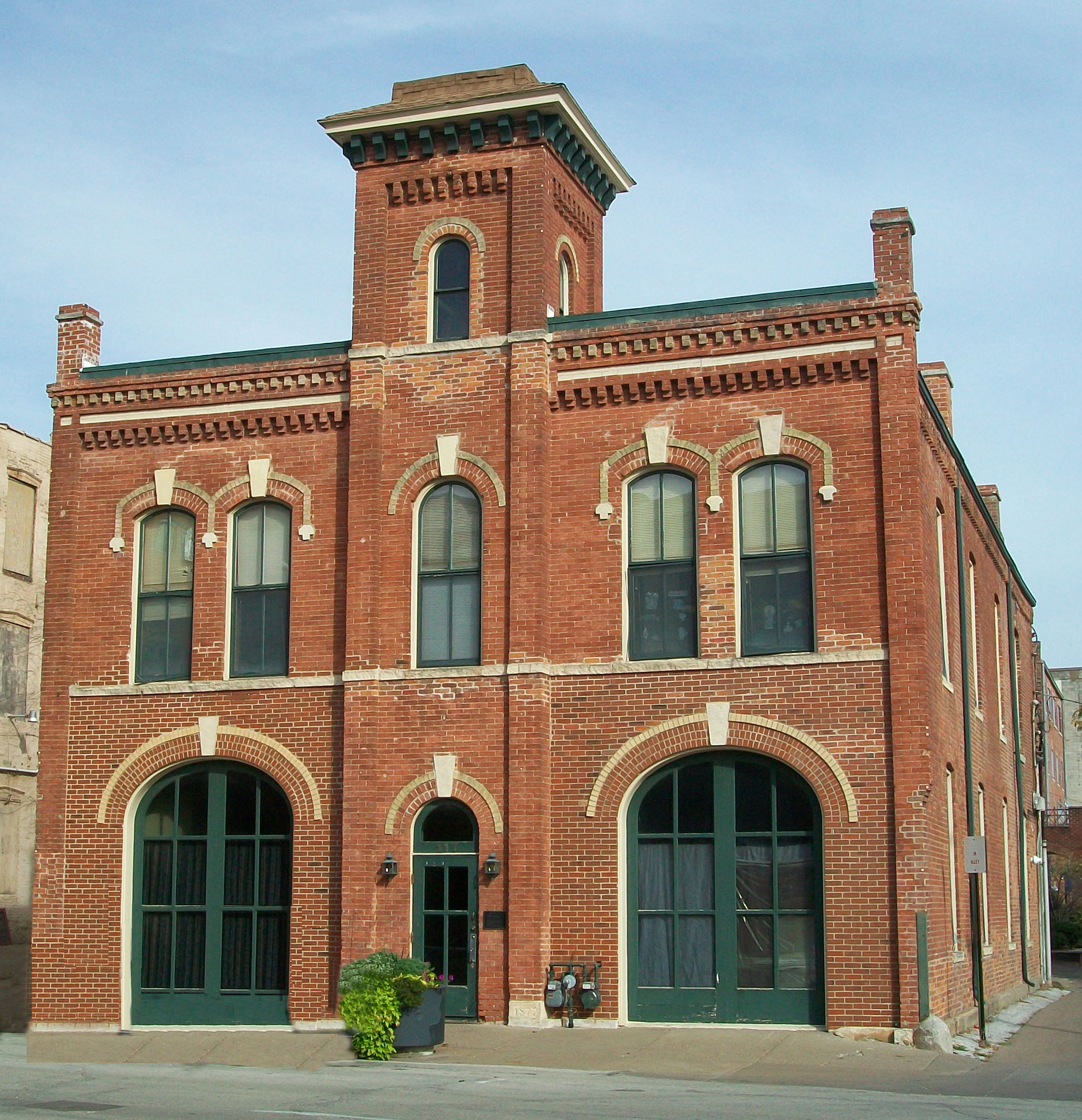

- Location within Iowa Location within the United States
- Location: 117 Perry St. Davenport, Iowa
- Coordinates: 41°31′15″N 90°34′20″W
- Area: less than one acre
- Built: 1877
- Architect: John W. Ross
- Architectural style: Italianate
- Part of: Davenport Motor Row and Industrial Historic District (ID100004113)
- MPS: Davenport MRA
- NRHP reference No.: 83002449
- DRHP No.: 30

Significant dates
- Added to NRHP: July 7, 1983
- Designated DRHP: June 2, 1999

The Hose Station No. 1 is a historic building located in downtown Davenport, Iowa, United States. It was listed on the National Register of Historic Places in 1983 and on the Davenport Register of Historic Properties in 1999. In 2019 it was included as a contributing property in the Davenport Motor Row and Industrial Historic District.

== History ==
Davenport's first city charter in 1839 permitted the town's trustees to establish a fire department. Not long after, all the residents of the town were required to maintain two buckets for fire protection. It wasn't until 1856 that volunteers were organized into the Independent Fire Engine and Hose Company, a privately operated organization. In the following years, a dozen other volunteer companies were formed, and a system of water mains and fire hydrants were put in that allowed for modern fire-fighting techniques.

Hose Station No. 1 was built in 1877 and the following year it housed the Fire King Engine 2nd Hose Company, which was still a volunteer crew. In 1878 the team became known as Hose Company No. 1 when it became a paid unit. Hose Station No. 1 was replaced by the Central Fire Station when it opened in 1902. In 1912 St. Alphonsus Catholic Church in Davenport purchased the station's old bell and placed it in the new church building that was under construction at the time. The second floor of the building became the clubhouse of Battery B, First Artillery Inc., a group of National Guard veterans who served in the 1916 Mexican border campaign. The first floor housed automotive uses from the 1930s to the 1950s. The building, which had fallen into disrepair, was renovated in the late 20th century.

== Architecture ==
Hose Station No. 1 was designed by Davenport architect John W. Ross. This is the earliest recorded commission of his. Ross is also known for his other civic designs: Davenport City Hall and the 1886 Scott County Courthouse.

Hose Station No. 1 is an Italianate structure built of red brick on a stone foundation. The rectangular structure has a central tower on the west elevation. The Italianate features of the building are the second-floor windows with their elongated shape, flat arch hoods, and 2/2 light configurations. The tower combines heavily hooded windows and there is a decorative brickwork cornice across the façade.

Firefighting equipment was stored behind two large doors on the main level of the building. The second floor provided dormitory space for the firefighters. The tower was designed so the fire hoses could be hung to dry. The words “Fire King” were displayed on the tower above the door.
