= National Register of Historic Places listings in east Davenport, Iowa =

Historic places in Davenport, Iowa

This is a list of the National Register of Historic Places listings in east Davenport, Iowa. This is intended to be a complete list of the properties and districts on the National Register of Historic Places in east Davenport, Iowa, United States. Eastern Davenport is defined as being all of the city east of Brady Street (U.S. Route 61) and north of 5th Street. The locations of National Register properties and districts may be seen in an online map.

There are 257 properties and districts listed on the National Register in Davenport. East Davenport includes 91 of these properties and districts; the city's remaining properties and districts are listed elsewhere. Many of these properties were included in a multiple property submission; they are marked below as "Davenport MRA."

This National Park Service list is complete through NPS recent listings posted August 22, 2025.

== Current listings ==
| | Name on the Register | Image | Date listed | Location | City or town | Description |
|---|---|---|---|---|---|---|
| 1 | Walker Adams House | Walker Adams House | July 27, 1984 (#84001313) | 1009 College Ave. 41°31′50″N 90°33′22″W | Davenport | An Italianate house, c.1875; Davenport Multiple Resource Area (MRA). |
| 2 | Ball-Waterman House | Ball-Waterman House | July 27, 1984 (#84001315) | 616 Kirkwood Boulevard; 41°32′11″N 90°33′58″W | Davenport | Late Victorian style residence from c. 1880; Davenport MRA. |
| 3 | Edward S. Barrows House | Edward S. Barrows House | November 21, 1976 (#76000807) | 224 E. 6th St. 41°31′34″N 90°34′18″W | Davenport | Greek Revival style house from c. 1850. |
| 4 | Leon Bismark Beiderbecke House | Leon Bismark Beiderbecke House | July 13, 1977 (#77000554) | 1934 Grand Ave. 41°32′21″N 90°33′54″W | Davenport | Boyhood home of jazz musician Bix Beiderbecke |
| 5 | John R. Boyle House | John R. Boyle House | July 7, 1983 (#83002403) | 408 E. 6th St. 41°31′33″N 90°34′09″W | Davenport | Italianate style house built in 1866; Davenport MRA. |
| 6 | Bridge Avenue Historic District | Bridge Avenue Historic District | November 28, 1983 (#83003626) | Bridge Ave. from River Dr. to 9th St. 41°31′41″N 90°33′28″W | Davenport | The district consists of fourteen homes along Bridge Avenue starting at River Drive and climbing the bluff to East Ninth Street; Davenport MRA. |
| 7 | Anthony Burdick House | Anthony Burdick House | July 27, 1984 (#84003854) | 833 College Ave. 41°31′43″N 90°33′21″W | Davenport | Italianate style residence c. 1880; Davenport MRA. |
| 8 | Diedrich Busch House | Diedrich Busch House | July 27, 1984 (#84001324) | 2340 E. 11th St. 41°31′53″N 90°32′32″W | Davenport | House built in 1877; Davenport MRA. |
| 9 | Calvary Baptist Church/First Baptist Church | Calvary Baptist Church/First Baptist Church | July 7, 1983 (#83002409) | 1401 Perry St. 41°32′04″N 90°34′20″W | Davenport | Romanesque Revival church built in 1890 when the congregation was called Calvary Baptist. In 1968 the congregation reverted to First Baptist Church; Davenport MRA. |
| 10 | W.S. Cameron House | W.S. Cameron House | July 27, 1984 (#84001325) | 623 Kirkwood Boulevard; 41°32′09″N 90°33′57″W | Davenport | House built c. 1880; Davenport MRA. |
| 11 | James Cawley House | James Cawley House | July 27, 1984 (#84001326) | 1406 Esplanade; 41°32′03″N 90°33′19″W | Davenport | House built in 1876; Davenport MRA. |
| 12 | Collins House | Collins House | October 8, 1976 (#76000808) | 1234 E. 29th St. 41°32′58″N 90°33′26″W | Davenport | Classical Revival style home built in 1860 as a farmhouse. |
| 13 | George Copeland House | George Copeland House | July 27, 1984 (#84001333) | 929 College Ave. 41°31′48″N 90°33′22″W | Davenport | House from c. 1880; Davenport MRA. |
| 14 | Cork Hill District | Cork Hill District | May 16, 1984 (#84001334) | Perry, Pershing, Iowa, 11th, 12th, and 13th Sts. 41°31′54″N 90°34′18″W | Davenport | The district included 12 contributing buildings when it was listed. It includes Greek Revival, Italianate, and Victorian architecture; Davenport MRA. |
| 15 | Crescent Warehouse Historic District | Crescent Warehouse Historic District | December 18, 2003 (#03001290) | Portions of E. 4th St., E. 5th St., Iowa St., and Pershing Ave. 41°31′27″N 90°34′13″W | Davenport | It includes 14 buildings deemed to be contributing to the historic character of the area, and two other contributing structures. |
| 16 | Currier House | Currier House | July 7, 1983 (#83002417) | 1421 Grand Ave. 41°32′06″N 90°33′53″W | Davenport | Queen Anne style residence from 1901; Davenport MRA. |
| 17 | Davenport Hose Station No. 3 | Davenport Hose Station No. 3 | July 27, 1984 (#84001336) | 326 E. Locust St. 41°32′18″N 90°34′12″W | Davenport | Neighborhood fire station built in 1921; Davenport MRA |
| 18 | Davenport Village | Davenport Village | March 17, 1980 (#80001459) | Roughly bounded by the Mississippi River, Spring, Judson, and 13th Sts., Kirkwood Boulevard, and Jersey Ridge Rd. 41°31′55″N 90°32′43″W | Davenport | Founded as a separate town called Upper Davenport in 1851, it was incorporated into the city of Davenport in 1856. Today it is known as the Village of East Davenport, a commercial and residential area. |
| 19 | Abner Davison House | Abner Davison House | July 27, 1984 (#84001341) | 1234 E. River Dr. 41°31′41″N 90°33′25″W | Davenport | The Italianate/Prairie style home was built in 1910 for Davenport attorney Abner Davison. It now serves as the location for Gilda’s Club of the Quad Cities; Davenport MRA. |
| 20 | Dils-Downer House | Dils-Downer House | July 7, 1983 (#83002422) | 1020 E. 15th St. 41°32′07″N 90°33′38″W | Davenport | A Shingle Style bungalow; Davenport MRA |
| 21 | East 14th Street Historic District | East 14th Street Historic District | November 18, 1983 (#83003649) | 14th St. from Pershing to Arlington Ave. 41°32′02″N 90°34′01″W | Davenport | Late Victorian homes along six blocks of East 14th Street; Davenport MRA. |
| 22 | D.C. Eldridge House | D.C. Eldridge House | July 27, 1984 (#84001402) | 1333 E. 10th St. 41°31′47″N 90°33′18″W | Davenport | Greek Revival house built in 1865 by one of the city's original settlers; Davenport MRA. |
| 23 | Theodore Eldridge House | Theodore Eldridge House | July 27, 1984 (#84001404) | 1404 E. 10th St. 41°31′49″N 90°33′17″W | Davenport | Italianate style residence built in 1878; Davenport MRA. |
| 24 | First Church of Christ, Scientist | First Church of Christ, Scientist | July 27, 1984 (#84001406) | 636 Kirkwood Boulevard; 41°32′11″N 90°33′55″W | Davenport | Classical Revival style church designed by the Davenport architectural firm of Clausen & Clausen and built in 1912. The structure now houses Harvest Time Family Worship Center; Davenport MRA |
| 25 | First Presbyterian Church | First Presbyterian Church | July 7, 1983 (#83002431) | 316 Kirkwood Boulevard; 41°32′11″N 90°34′12″W | Davenport | Richardsonian Romanesque church designed by the Davenport architectural firm of Clausen & Burrows: Davenport MRA. |
| 26 | Alice French House | Alice French House | July 7, 1983 (#83002434) | 321 E. 10th St. 41°31′47″N 90°34′13″W | Davenport | Colonial Revival style home of author Alice French who wrote under the pen name Octave Thanet; Davenport MRA. |
| 27 | William Gabbert House | William Gabbert House | July 7, 1983 (#83002435) | 1210 Tremont St. 41°31′56″N 90°33′41″W | Davenport | Gothic Revival style residence designed by George Shaw and built in 1895; Davenport MRA. |
| 28 | M.V. Gannon House | M.V. Gannon House | July 7, 1983 (#83002436) | 631 Farnam St. 41°31′36″N 90°33′59″W | Davenport | Italianate style home of prominent lawyer, politician, and publisher Michael V. Gannon; Davenport MRA. |
| 29 | Isaac Glaspell House | Isaac Glaspell House | July 7, 1983 (#83002439) | 621 LeClaire St. 41°31′35″N 90°34′04″W | Davenport | Greek Revival style residence designed by John Whitaker and built in 1875; Davenport MRA. |
| 30 | William T. Goodrich House | William T. Goodrich House | July 7, 1983 (#83002441) | 1156 E. 15th St. 41°32′07″N 90°33′29″W | Davenport | Queen Anne style residence from 1900; Davenport MRA. |
| 31 | Gordon–Van Tine Company Historic District | Gordon–Van Tine Company Historic District | March 7, 2017 (#100000718) | 736 Federal St. and 737 Charlotte St. 41°31′31″N 90°33′49″W | Davenport | Production, shipping and office facility for the Gordon–Van Tine Company, which produced mail-order houses. |
| 32 | Finley Guy Building | Finley Guy Building | July 27, 1984 (#84001426) | 310 E. Locust St. 41°32′18″N 90°34′13″W | Davenport | Mission/Spanish Revival style commercial building; Davenport MRA. |
| 33 | Israel Hall House | Israel Hall House | July 27, 1984 (#84001427) | 1316 E. 10th St. 41°31′49″N 90°33′20″W | Davenport | Greek Revival style residence built in 1878; Davenport MRA. |
| 34 | Isaac W. Harrison House | Isaac W. Harrison House | July 23, 2015 (#83004560) | 318 E. 10th St. 41°31′48″N 90°34′13″W | Davenport | Davenport MRA. |
| 35 | Louis Hebert House | Louis Hebert House | July 7, 1983 (#83002443) | 914 Farnam St. 41°31′45″N 90°34′01″W | Davenport | Greek Revival style house built in 1865; Davenport MRA. |
| 36 | Hillside | Hillside | February 4, 1982 (#82002640) | 1 Prospect Dr. 41°31′43″N 90°33′11″W | Davenport | Colonial Revival mansion that was built in 1906 overlooking the Mississippi River. It was designed by Frederick G. Clausen for Charles Schuler, who owned Schuler Coal. |
| 37 | William Holbrook House | William Holbrook House | July 27, 1984 (#84001440) | 804 Kirkwood Boulevard; 41°32′11″N 90°33′49″W | Davenport | Shingle Style, Queen Anne residence from 1892; Davenport MRA. |
| 38 | House at 919 Oneida Street | House at 919 Oneida Street | April 5, 1984 (#84001444) | 919 Oneida St. 41°31′47″N 90°33′32″W | Davenport | Late Victorian house built in 1875; Davenport MRA. |
| 39 | Iowa Soldiers' Orphans' Home Historic District | Iowa Soldiers' Orphans' Home Historic District | April 26, 1982 (#82002641) | 2800 Eastern Ave. 41°32′50″N 90°33′11″W | Davenport | A former orphanage built for children who lost their fathers during the American Civil War. It served as a state run facility until 1975. Since 1949 it was called the Annie Wittenmyer Home, and now serves as office space for non-profits. |
| 40 | Kimball-Stevenson House | Kimball-Stevenson House | July 7, 1983 (#83002458) | 116 E. 6th St. 41°31′33″N 90°34′24″W | Davenport | Italianate style house built in 1873 that once housed a brothel; Davenport MRA. |
| 41 | Nicholas J. Kuhnen House | Nicholas J. Kuhnen House | July 7, 1983 (#83002462) | 702 Perry St. 41°31′38″N 90°34′23″W | Davenport | Italianate style house designed by Davenport architect John Ross and built in 1887 for cigar manufacturer Nicholas J. Kuhnen; Davenport MRA. |
| 42 | Antoine LeClaire House | Antoine LeClaire House | March 22, 1974 (#74000809) | 630 E. 7th St. 41°31′38″N 90°33′55″W | Davenport | Italianate style mansion built in 1855 by Antoine LeClaire, one of the founders and promoters of the city of Davenport. The house also served as the residence of the first two Catholic bishops of Davenport. |
| 43 | Lincoln School | Lincoln School | October 24, 2002 (#02001239) | 318 E. 7th St. 41°31′38″N 90°34′14″W | Davenport | Elementary school building designed by Howard S. Muesse and built in 1940. It is part of the Public Schools for Iowa: Growth and Change MPS. |
| 44 | James E. Lindsay House | James E. Lindsay House | July 27, 1984 (#84001465) | 911 College Ave. 41°31′46″N 90°33′22″W | Davenport | Italianate style house built in 1876; Davenport MRA. |
| 45 | Joseph Mallet House | Joseph Mallet House | July 7, 1983 (#83002465) | 415 E. 10th St. 41°31′47″N 90°34′08″W | Davenport | A simplified version of the Italianate style built in 1876; Davenport MRA. |
| 46 | McBride-Hickey House | McBride-Hickey House | July 7, 1983 (#83002467) | 701 Iowa St. 41°31′37″N 90°34′10″W | Davenport | Late Victorian residence from 1890; Davenport MRA. |
| 47 | McClellan Heights Historic District | McClellan Heights Historic District | November 1, 1984 (#84000328) | Roughly bounded by the city limits, E. River Dr., East St., and Jersey Ridge and Middle Rds. 41°31′55″N 90°32′14″W | Davenport | Site of the American Civil War army camp, Camp McClellan, it became a residential area in the late 19th century. It includes 354 buildings deemed to contribute to the historic character of the area; Davenport MRA. |
| 48 | McKinley Elementary School | McKinley Elementary School | October 24, 2002 (#02001222) | 1716 Kenwood Ave. 41°32′13″N 90°32′12″W | Davenport | Elementary school designed by Kruse & Parrish and built in 1953. It is part of the Public Schools for Iowa: Growth and Change MPS. |
| 49 | McKinney House | McKinney House | July 7, 1983 (#83002468) | 512 E. 8th St. 41°31′41″N 90°34′04″W | Davenport | Greek Revival style residence built in 1872; Davenport MRA. |
| 50 | F.H. Miller House | F.H. Miller House | July 7, 1983 (#83002472) | 1527 Brady St. 41°32′09″N 90°34′25″W | Davenport | Italianate style house designed by W.L. Carroll and built in 1871. It served as the home of the third and fourth Catholic bishops of Davenport in the 20th century; Davenport MRA. |
| 51 | Joseph Motie House | Joseph Motie House | November 18, 1983 (#83003668) | 421 E. 10th St. 41°31′47″N 90°34′08″W | Davenport | A simplified version of the Italianate style from 1860; Davenport MRA. |
| 52 | Thomas Murray House | Thomas Murray House | July 27, 1984 (#84001485) | 628 Kirkwood Boulevard; 41°32′11″N 90°33′56″W | Davenport | Italianate style residence built in 1881; Davenport MRA. |
| 53 | Lucian Newhall House | Lucian Newhall House | July 7, 1983 (#83002476) | 526 Iowa St. 41°31′31″N 90°34′12″W | Davenport | Italianate style residence built in 1875; Davenport MRA. |
| 54 | Oscar Nichols House | Oscar Nichols House | July 7, 1983 (#83002477) | 1013 Tremont St. 41°31′50″N 90°33′39″W | Davenport | Stick, Eastlake style residence built in 1884; Davenport MRA. |
| 55 | Benjamin Nighswander House | Benjamin Nighswander House | July 27, 1984 (#84001487) | 1011 Kirkwood Boulevard; 41°32′09″N 90°33′39″W | Davenport | Queen Anne style residence built in 1896; Davenport MRA. |
| 56 | Oak Lane Historic District | Oak Lane Historic District | November 1, 1984 (#84000331) | Oak Lane between High and Locust Sts. 41°32′22″N 90°33′47″W | Davenport | Residential area that stretches along Oak Lane with houses designed by Gustav Hanssen and William A. Otis that were built between 1875 and 1906, Davenport MRA. |
| 57 | Oakdale Cemetery Historic District | Oakdale Cemetery Historic District | May 5, 2015 (#15000194) | 2501 Eastern Ave. 41°32′48″N 90°32′52″W | Davenport | Sprawling 78.1 acre Victorian cemetery, landscape designed by George F. de la Roche, with various structures designed by John W. Ross, Edward S. Hammatt, and Clausen & Kruse, incorporated in 1856, with burials from 1855 to the present day. |
| 58 | Henry Ockershausen House | Henry Ockershausen House | April 5, 1984 (#84001495) | 1024 Charlotte St. 41°31′39″N 90°33′34″W | Davenport | Queen Anne style residence built in 1908; Davenport MRA. |
| 59 | Outing Club | Outing Club | July 15, 1977 (#77000556) | 2109 Brady St. 41°32′28″N 90°34′22″W | Davenport | Colonial Revival style building designed by Davenport architect Parke T. Burrows and built in 1905 to house a social club, a purpose for which it remains today. |
| 60 | Pierce School No. 13 | Pierce School No. 13 | July 7, 1983 (#83002486) | 2212 E. 12th St. 41°31′58″N 90°32′42″W | Davenport | Former Renaissance Revival elementary school building designed by Davenport architect Parke T. Burrows. It now serves as commercial space; Davenport MRA. |
| 61 | Potter-Williams House | Potter-Williams House | April 5, 1984 (#84001522) | 427 E. 7th St. 41°31′36″N 90°34′07″W | Davenport | Greek Revival style residence built in 1872; Davenport MRA. |
| 62 | Hiram Price/Henry Vollmer House | Hiram Price/Henry Vollmer House | July 7, 1983 (#83002487) | 723 Brady St. 41°31′39″N 90°34′24″W | Davenport | Italianate style house that was built in 1870 and was owned by two congressmen who represented Iowa's Second Congressional District. Davenport MRA |
| 63 | The Priester Building | The Priester Building | January 17, 2017 (#100000493) | 601 Brady St. 41°31′34″N 90°34′26″W | Davenport | Modern movement office building from 1959. |
| 64 | Prospect Park Historic District | Prospect Park Historic District | November 1, 1984 (#84000338) | Roughly bounded by E. River Dr., Mississippi Ave., Prospect Terr., and 11th and Adams Sts. 41°31′47″N 90°33′09″W | Davenport | Residential area that includes 23 contributing buildings; Davenport MRA. |
| 65 | Jacob Quickel House | Jacob Quickel House | July 27, 1984 (#84001524) | 1712 Davenport St. 41°32′14″N 90°33′50″W | Davenport | Gothic Revival style residence from 1880: Davenport MRA. |
| 66 | Willam Radcliff House | Willam Radcliff House | July 27, 1984 (#84001530) | 904 College Ave. 41°31′45″N 90°33′24″W | Davenport | Bungalow/Craftsman style residence built in 1911; Davenport MRA. |
| 67 | Renwick House | Renwick House | July 7, 1983 (#83002492) | 1429 Brady St. 41°32′06″N 90°34′25″W | Davenport | Colonial Revival house from 1905; Davenport MRA. |
| 68 | Edward C. Roberts House | Edward C. Roberts House | July 27, 1984 (#84001533) | 918 E. Locust St. 41°32′19″N 90°33′42″W | Davenport | Prairie School style residence built in 1909; Davenport MRA. |
| 69 | Roslyn Flats | Roslyn Flats | July 7, 1983 (#83004375) | 739 Perry St. 41°31′41″N 90°34′20″W | Davenport | Three-story apartment building built over a raised basement in 1901; Davenport MRA. |
| 70 | Rowhouses at 702-712 Kirkwood Boulevard | Rowhouses at 702-712 Kirkwood Boulevard | July 27, 1984 (#84001535) | 702-712 Kirkwood Boulevard; 41°32′11″N 90°33′53″W | Davenport | Tudor Revival structure built in 1905; Davenport MRA. |
| 71 | Sacred Heart Roman Catholic Cathedral Complex | Sacred Heart Roman Catholic Cathedral Complex | April 5, 1984 (#84001537) | 406 and 422 E. 10th St. and 419 E. 11th St. 41°31′49″N 90°34′08″W | Davenport | Gothic revival style church built in 1891. Designation also includes the rectory and the former convent; Davenport MRA. |
| 72 | St. John's Methodist Church | St. John's Methodist Church | July 7, 1983 (#83002509) | 1325-1329 Brady St. 41°32′02″N 90°34′26″W | Davenport | Late Gothic Revival style church designed by Davenport Architects Parke Burrows and F.G. Claussen, and built in 1903; Davenport MRA. |
| 73 | St. Katherine's Historic District | St. Katherine's Historic District | April 5, 1984 (#84001551) | 901 Tremont St. 41°31′43″N 90°33′36″W | Davenport | Italian Vila and Gothic Revival style buildings designed by Davenport architects John C. Cochrane and Edward S. Hammatt. It served as a girls' school operated by the Episcopal Diocese of Iowa; Davenport MRA. |
| 74 | Louis C. and Amelia L. Schmidt House | Louis C. and Amelia L. Schmidt House | May 8, 2007 (#07000407) | 1138 Oneida Ave. 41°31′56″N 90°33′34″W | Davenport | Queen Anne style residence from 1895. |
| 75 | Fred B. Sharon House | Fred B. Sharon House | July 7, 1983 (#83002503) | 728 Farnam St. 41°31′40″N 90°34′01″W | Davenport | Second Empire style home built in 1910 by the founder of Davenport's Catholic newspaper The Catholic Messenger; Davenport MRA. |
| 76 | E.A. Shaw House | E.A. Shaw House | July 27, 1984 (#84001561) | 1102 College Ave. 41°31′53″N 90°33′25″W | Davenport | Queen Anne style residence designed by Davenport architect Gustave A. Hanssen and built in 1901; Davenport MRA. |
| 77 | Shields Woolen Mill | Shields Woolen Mill | July 7, 1983 (#83002504) | 1235 E. River Dr. 41°31′38″N 90°33′24″W | Davenport | A 19th century industrial building that has been repurposed as commercial and office space; Davenport MRA. |
| 78 | Charles S. Simpson House | Charles S. Simpson House | July 7, 1983 (#83002505) | 1503 Farnam St. 41°32′07″N 90°33′59″W | Davenport | Colonial/Georgian Revival style house built in 1910; Davenport MRA. |
| 79 | Henry H. Smith/J.H. Murphy House | Henry H. Smith/J.H. Murphy House | July 7, 1983 (#83002508) | 512 E. 6th St. 41°31′34″N 90°34′04″W | Davenport | Built by Davenport merchant Henry H. “Variety” Smith in 1854 based on the philosophy of phrenologist Orson Fowler. It was designed by Davenport architect Willett L. Carroll; Davenport MRA |
| 80 | James Smith House | James Smith House | July 27, 1984 (#84001563) | 1037 E. 18th St. 41°32′14″N 90°33′36″W | Davenport | Greek Revival style residence built in 1865; Davenport MRA. |
| 81 | William G. Smith House | William G. Smith House | April 5, 1984 (#84001566) | 1002 Bridge St. 41°31′49″N 90°33′29″W | Davenport | Queen Anne style residence built in 1894; Davenport MRA. |
| 82 | J.W. Stewart House | J.W. Stewart House | July 7, 1983 (#83002513) | 212 E. 6th St. 41°31′33″N 90°34′20″W | Davenport | Italianate style residence built in 1865; Davenport MRA. |
| 83 | George B. Swan House | George B. Swan House | July 7, 1983 (#83002514) | 909 Farnam St. 41°31′45″N 90°33′59″W | Davenport | Greek Revival style residence built in 1881; Davenport MRA. |
| 84 | Swedish Baptist Church | Swedish Baptist Church | July 7, 1983 (#83002515) | 700 E. 6th St. 41°31′36″N 90°33′52″W | Davenport | Built as a Baptist church in the late 19th century the building now houses Kingdom Generation Church; Davenport MRA. |
| 85 | I. Edward Templeton House | I. Edward Templeton House | July 7, 1983 (#83002517) | 1315 Perry St. 41°32′01″N 90°34′20″W | Davenport | Shingle Style house from 1890; Davenport MRA. |
| 86 | Vander Veer Park Historic District | Vander Veer Park Historic District | April 9, 1985 (#85000784) | Roughly bounded by Temple Lane, W. Central Park Ave., and Brady, High, and Harrison Sts. 41°32′35″N 90°34′28″W | Davenport | Established as Central Park on the former fair grounds, the botanical park and its surrounding neighborhoods make up the district; Davenport MRA. Extends into West Davenport. |
| 87 | Frank J. Von Ach House | Frank J. Von Ach House | July 27, 1984 (#84001579) | 1618 Davenport St. 41°32′13″N 90°33′51″W | Davenport | Queen Anne and Colonial Revival style residence built in 1896; Davenport MRA. |
| 88 | Warner Apartment Building | Warner Apartment Building | July 7, 1983 (#83002523) | 414-416 E. 6th St. 41°31′33″N 90°34′08″W | Davenport | Tudor Revival apartment building which has subsequently been torn down; Davenport MRA. |
| 89 | Charles Whitaker House | Charles Whitaker House | January 14, 1985 (#85000090) | 1530 E. 12th St. 41°31′57″N 90°33′09″W | Davenport | Queen Anne style residence from 1885; Davenport MRA. |
| 90 | WOC Broadcasting Center | WOC Broadcasting Center | February 17, 2021 (#100006171) | 805 Brady St. 41°31′43″N 90°34′25″W | Davenport | Modern-style television studio built in 1963. It was built for both WOC television and radio stations. It currently houses KWQC-TV. |
| 91 | Oscar C. Woods House | Oscar C. Woods House | November 1, 1984 (#84000342) | 1825 Grand Ave. 41°32′17″N 90°33′53″W | Davenport | McClelland style residence from 1900; Davenport MRA. |

== Former listings ==
| | Name on the Register | Image | Date listed | Date removed | Location | City or town | Description |
|---|---|---|---|---|---|---|---|
| 1 | Lewis M. Fisher House | Lewis M. Fisher House | July 7, 1983 (#83002432) | March 7, 2016 | 1003 Arlington Ave. 41°31′49″N 90°33′44″W | Davenport | Queen Anne and Colonial Revival style house built in 1895; Davenport MRA. |

== See also ==
- List of National Historic Landmarks in Iowa
- National Register of Historic Places listings in Iowa
