= Lucian Newhall House =

Lucian Newhall House may refer to:

- Lucian Newhall House (Davenport, Iowa)
- Lucian Newhall House (Lynn, Massachusetts)
