= James E. Lindsay House =

Historic house in Iowa, United States

- U.S. National Register of Historic Places
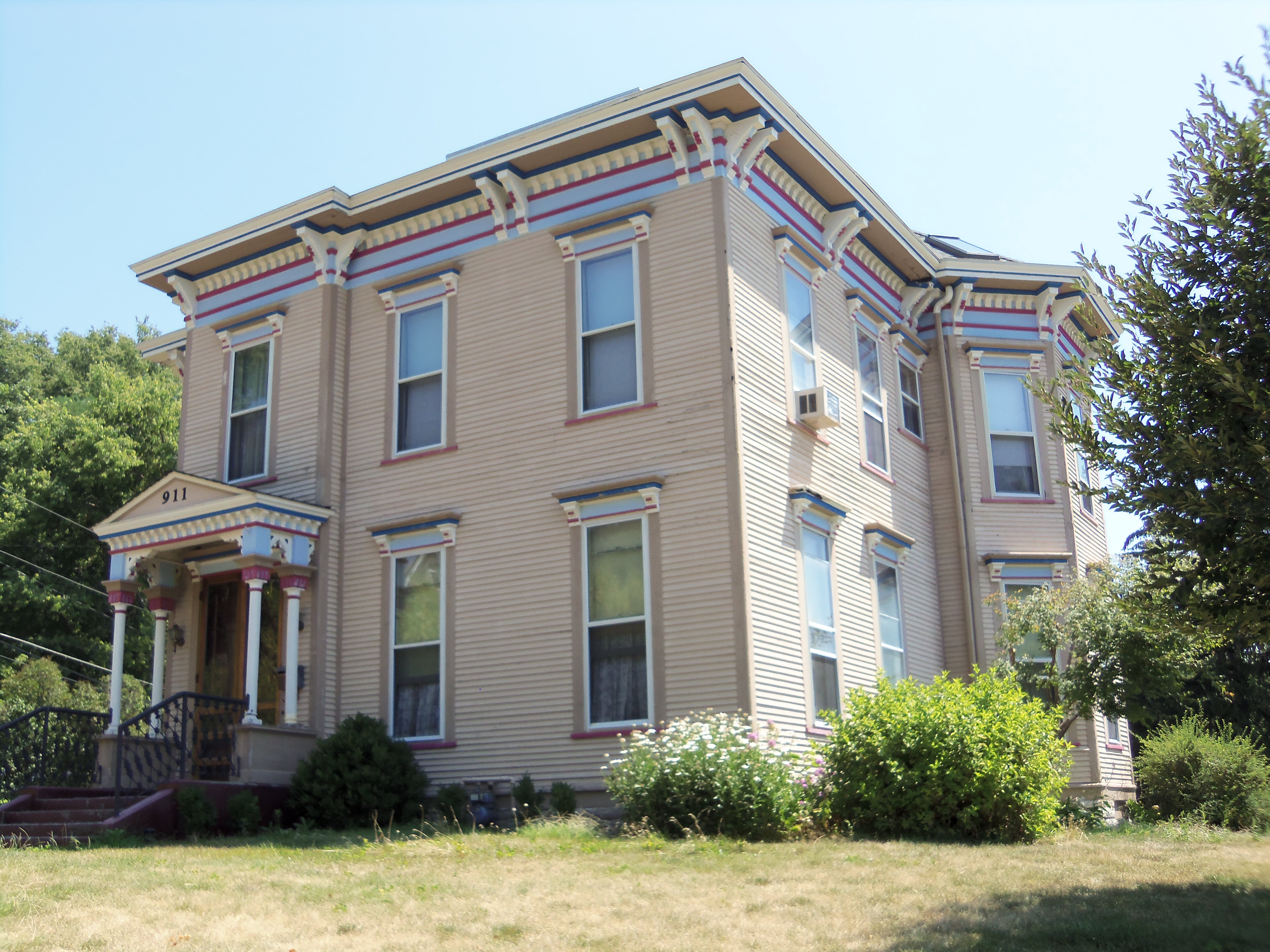

- Location within Iowa Location within the United States
- Location: 911 College Ave. Davenport, Iowa
- Coordinates: 41°31′45″N 90°33′22″W
- Area: less than one acre
- Built: 1876
- Architectural style: Italianate
- MPS: Davenport MRA
- NRHP reference No.: 84001465
- Added to NRHP: July 27, 1984

The James E. Lindsay House is a historic building located on the east side of Davenport, Iowa, United States. It has been listed on the National Register of Historic Places since 1984.

== James E. Lindsay ==
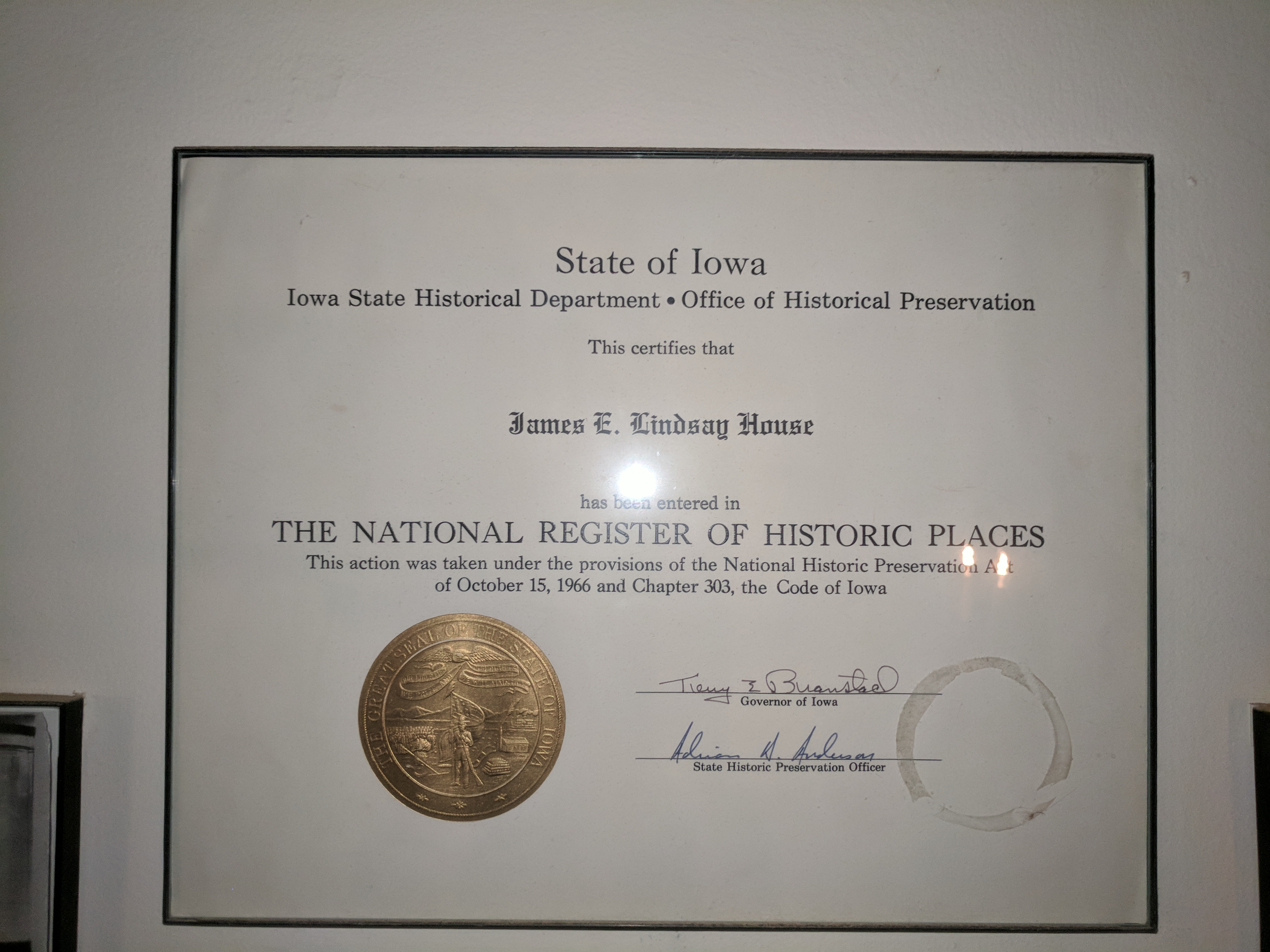
State of Iowa - Iowa State Historical Department - Office of Historical Preservation - This certifies that James E. Lindsay House has been entered in THE NATIONAL REGISTER OF HISTORIC PLACES - This action taken under provisions of the National Historic Preservation Act of October 15, 1966 and Chapter 303, the Code of Iowa. Signed by Governor of Iowa and State Historic Preservation Officer.

[[

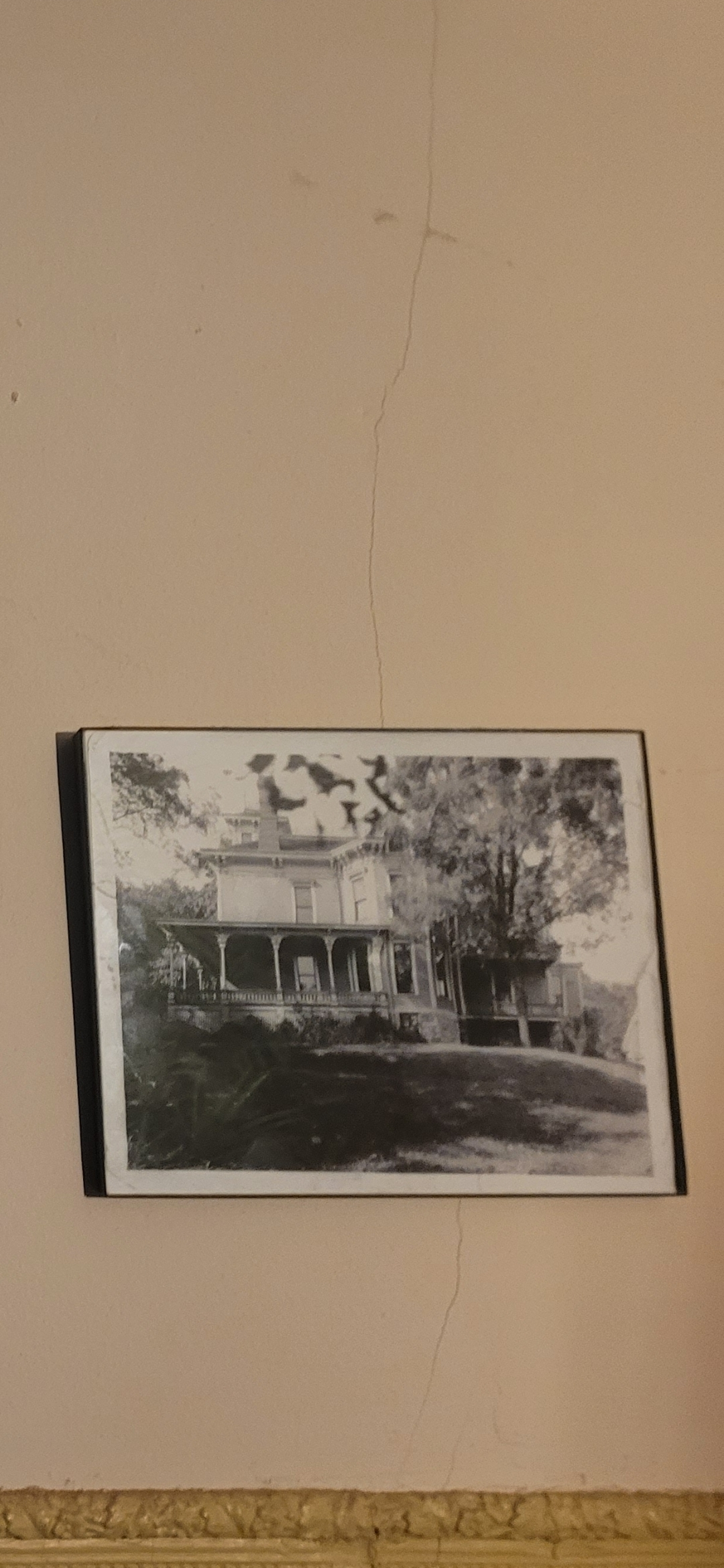
Historical photo of the James E Lindsey House in Davenport Iowa as viewed from the alley

|thumb]] [[

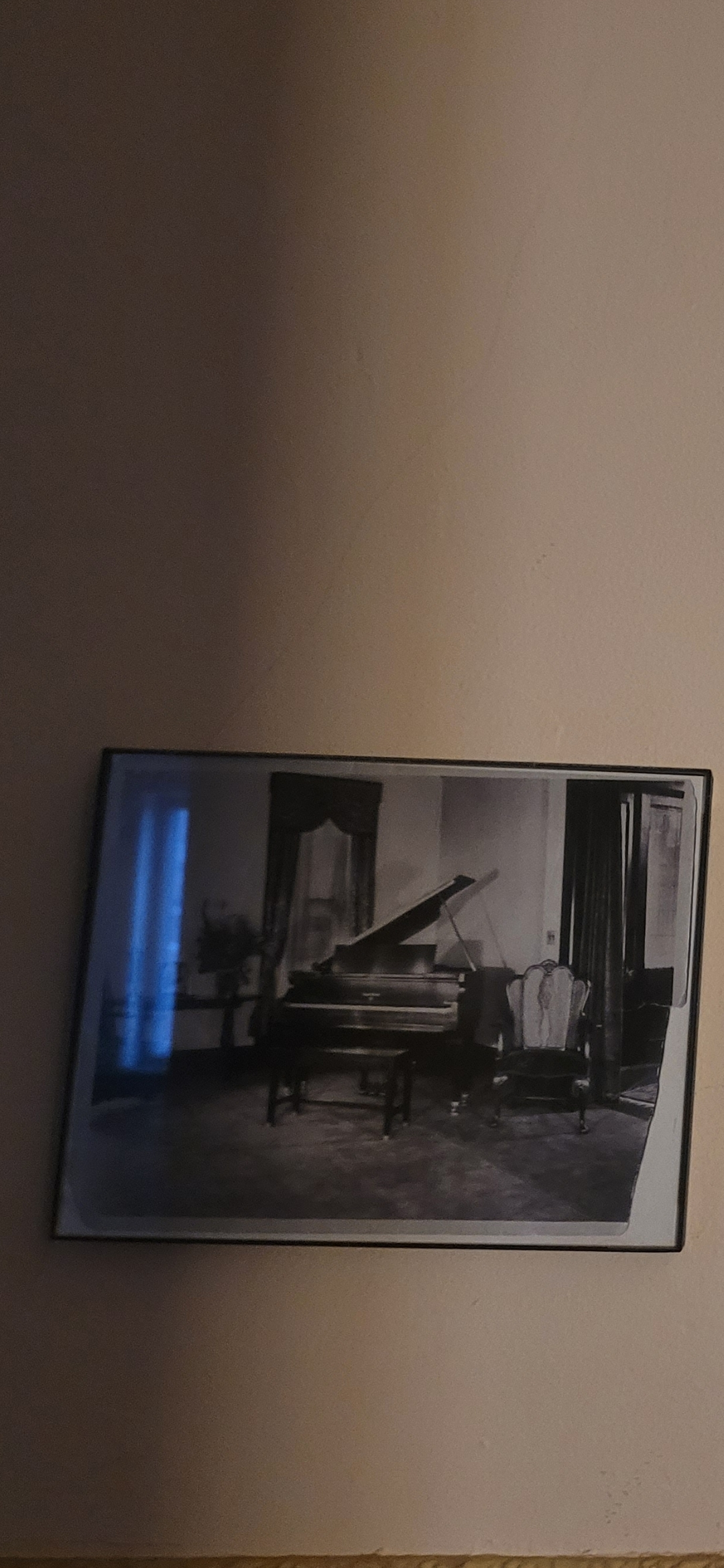
This photo is of the James E Lindsey home music room, which is on the right hand side when entering the home from college street and is still used as a music room today

|thumb]]

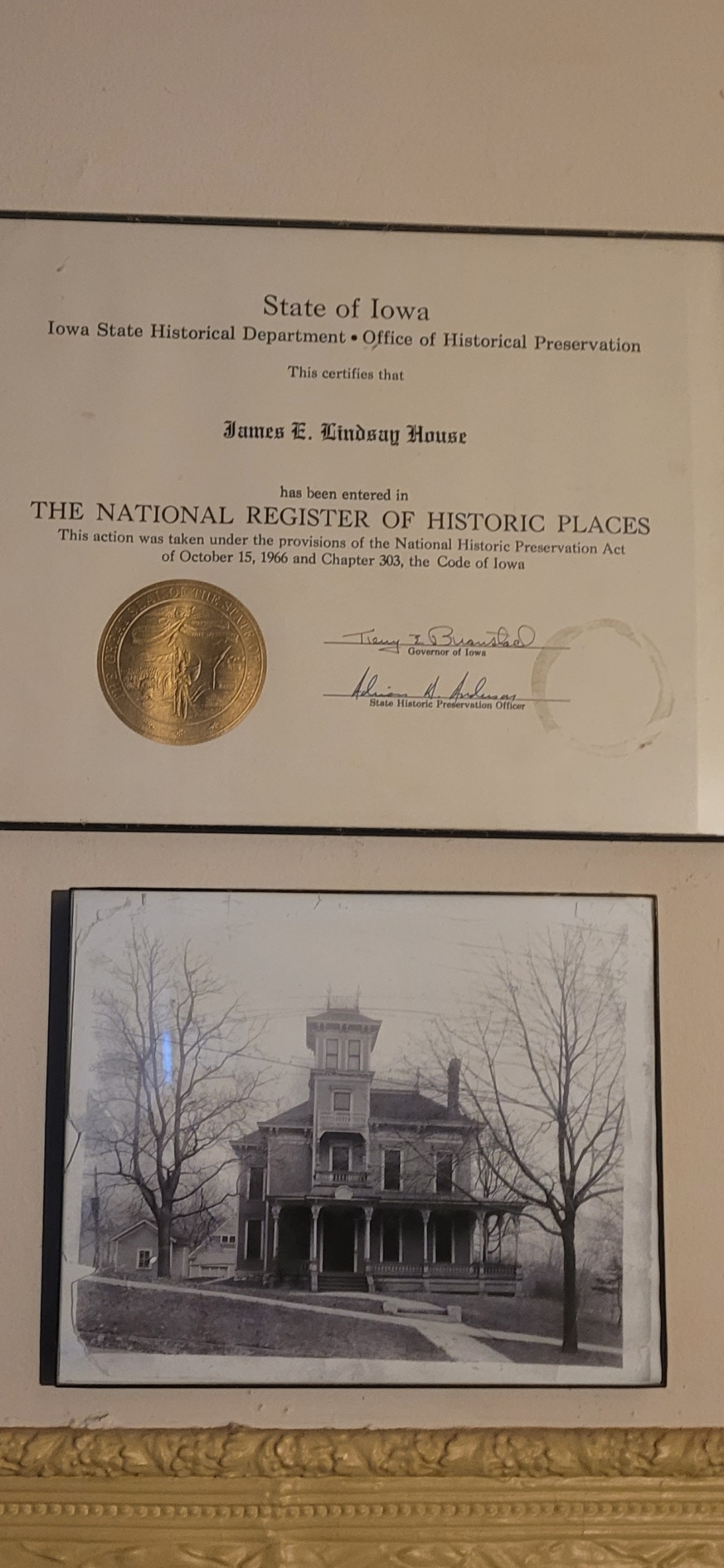
This photo shows both the Iowa historical registration certificate and the James E Lindsey home from College street

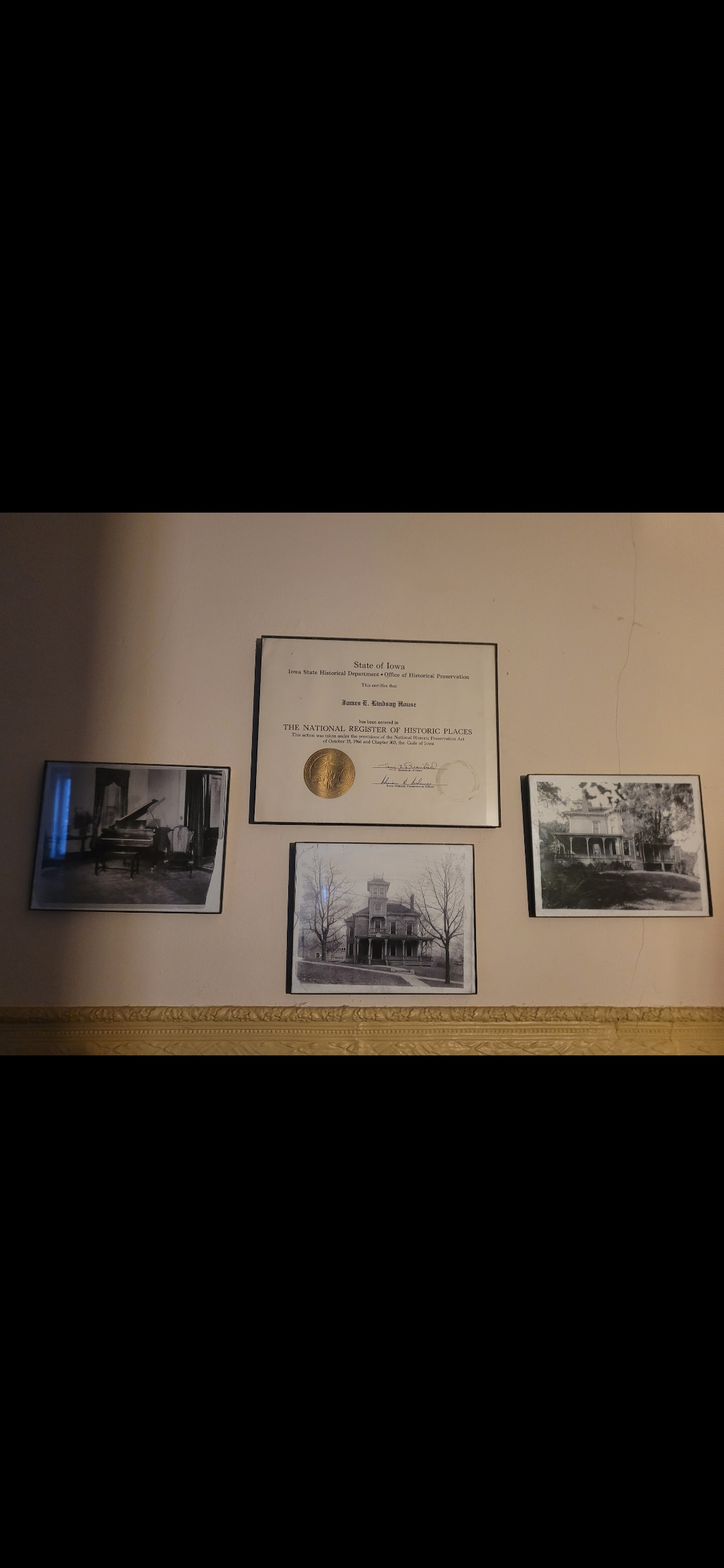
Photos of the Iowa Historical Registration and historical photos of the James E Lindsey house in Davenport Iowa. Including pictures of the music room by the main entrance, and the exterior of the home as viewed from College street and alley.

James Lindsay was a native of Essex County, New York and grew up working in his father's lumber mill. In 1856 he moved and purchased land in Wisconsin. He moved to Davenport in 1861 where his Wisconsin timber was rafted down the Mississippi River and sawed into lumber. He went into business with John B. Phelps. The two bought a mill on the east side of Davenport, which they named the Lindsay & Phelps, Co. His interests in lumber eventually led him to ventures in Arkansas, Minnesota, Washington State, Oregon, and Louisiana. In some of these ventures he joined with Frederick Weyerhaeuser from Rock Island, Illinois. In 1858 he married Mary Helen Phelps and they raised three children.

Lindsay built this home for his family in 1876. W.T. Waterman acquired the house from Lindsay's estate in the early 20th century. He was an associate in the law firm Lane and Waterman, which his father C.M. Waterman was one of the founding partners.

== Architecture ==
The Lindsay House is one of several Italianate style houses in the Fulton Addition. The two-story frame house is influenced by the Victorian styles of the era. It features an irregular roofscape, progressive setback of projecting masses, a bracketed cornice, window trim, double-door entry, and its original front porch.
