= Willam Radcliff House =

Historic house in Iowa, United States

- U.S. National Register of Historic Places
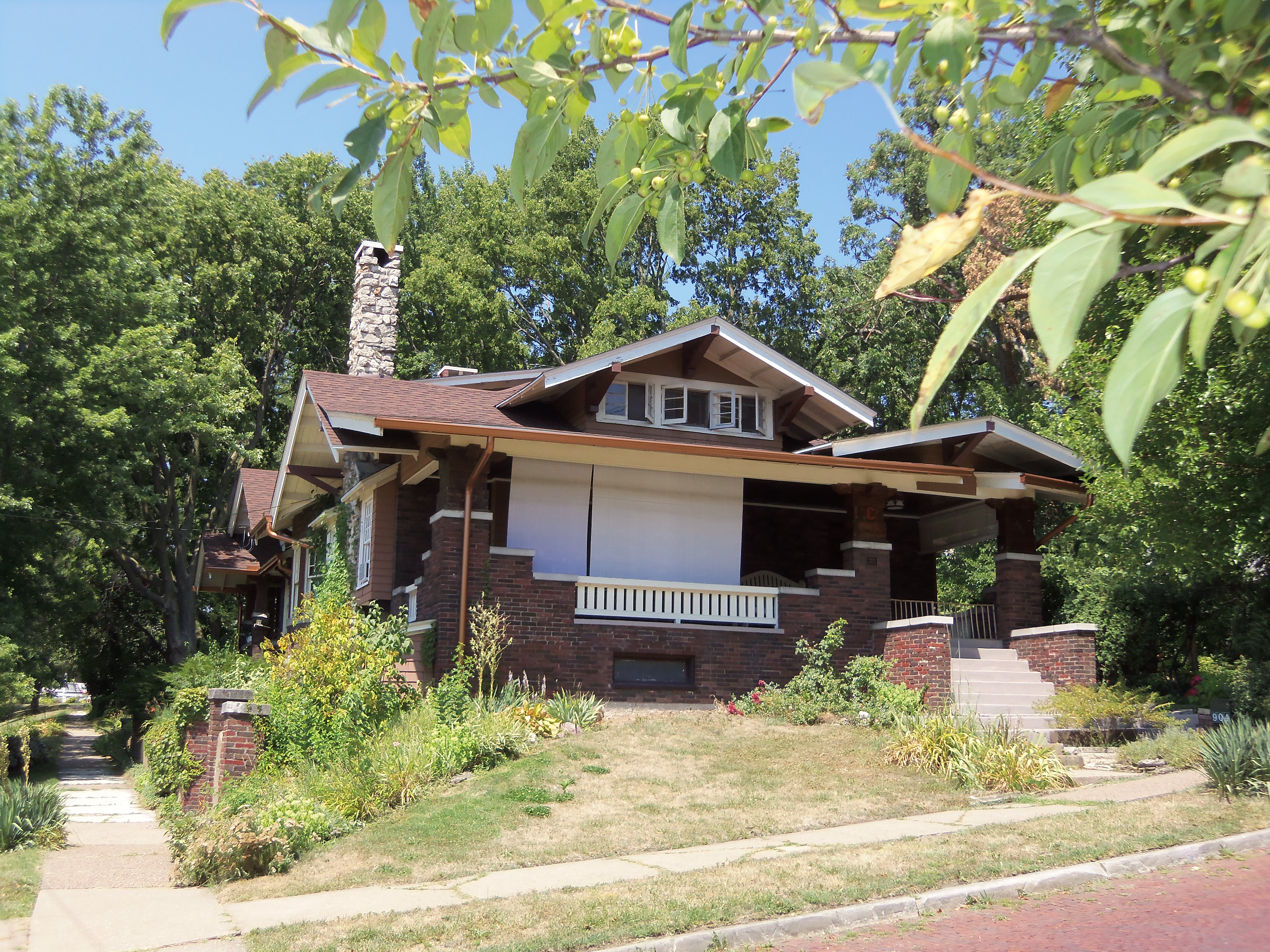

- Location within Iowa Location within the United States
- Location: 904 College Ave. Davenport, Iowa
- Coordinates: 41°31′45″N 90°33′24″W
- Area: less than one acre
- Built: 1911
- Architectural style: Bungalow/Craftsman
- MPS: Davenport MRA
- NRHP reference No.: 84001530
- Added to NRHP: July 27, 1984

The Willam Radcliff House is a historic building located on the east side of Davenport, Iowa, United States. It has been listed on the National Register of Historic Places since 1984.

== History ==
William and Emily Radcliff had this house built in 1911. Radcliff was the secretary and treasurer for the Register Life and Annuity Insurance Co.

== Architecture ==
The Radcliff's house is one of the more distinguished examples of the American Craftsman style in Davenport. It reflects the influence of California's prototypes of the style. These influences are found in the houses open plan, the wide eaves, the numerous gables, and the rounded ends of the porch brackets. The house's low profile emphasizes its horizontality. It is also expressed in its plain vergeboards with raked ends on the shallow gabled roofs and dormers. The materials used in the house's construction are also appropriate for the Craftsman style. It features plain wood, wall shingles, smooth brick, glazed gray terracotta, and rubble fieldstone.
