= William Gabbert House =

Historic house in Iowa, United States

- U.S. National Register of Historic Places
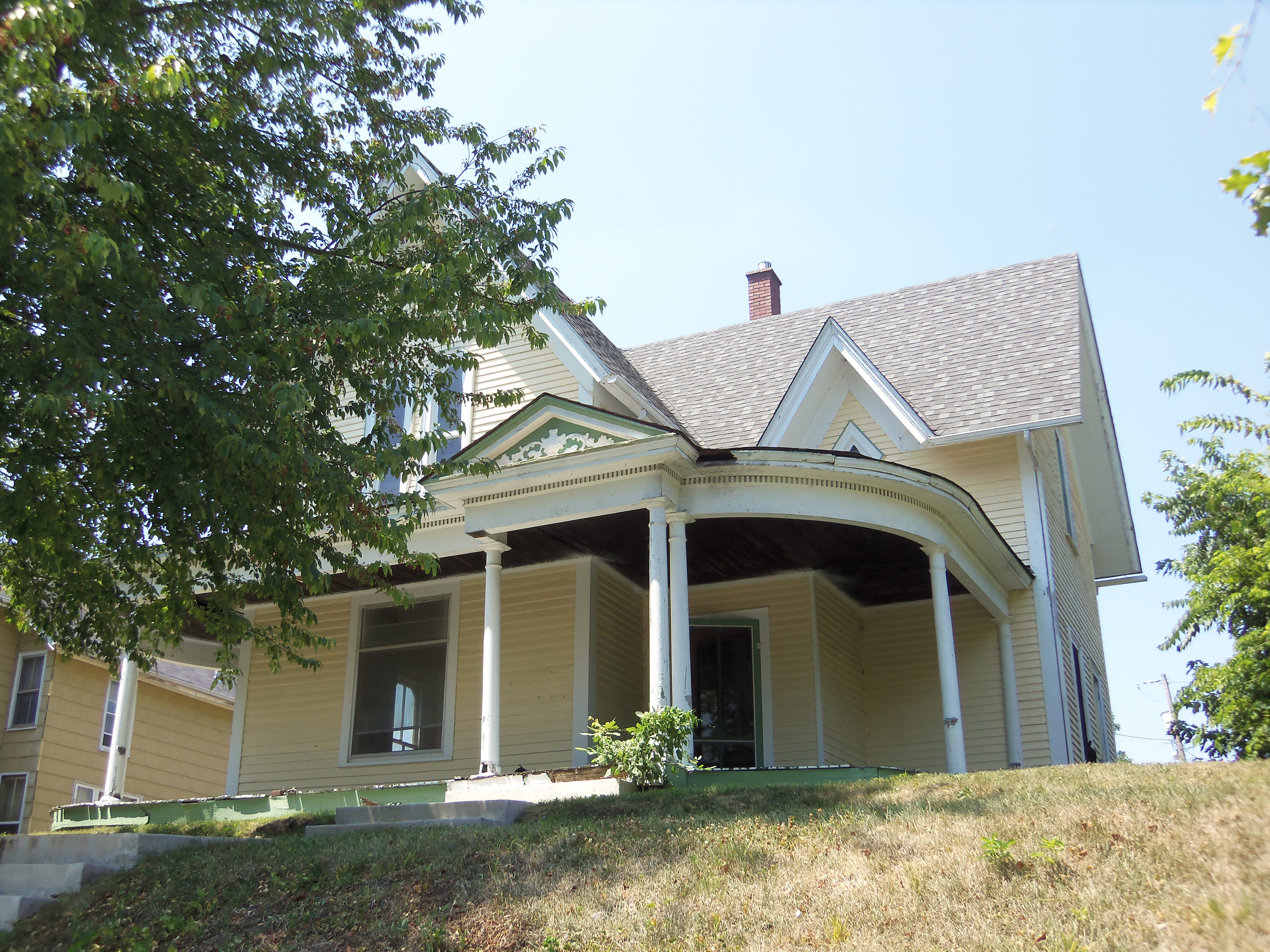

- Location within Iowa Location within the United States
- Location: 1210 Tremont St. Davenport, Iowa
- Coordinates: 41°31′56″N 90°33′41″W
- Area: less than one acre
- Built: 1873
- Built by: George Shaw
- Architectural style: Gothic Revival
- MPS: Davenport MRA
- NRHP reference No.: 83002435
- Added to NRHP: July 7, 1983

The William Gabbert House is a historic building located on the east side of Davenport, Iowa, United States. The structure is one of the last remaining Gothic Revival houses left in Davenport. The cross-gabled roof with the steep pitch and the small wall dormer are its distinguishable features. The chamfered corners on the windows and the diamond-shaped windows on the dormer and gable ends contributes to its sense of verticality. The Colonial Revival porch was added sometime in the 1890s and diminishes its impact. The house has been listed on the National Register of Historic Places since 1983.
