= Dils–Downer House =

Historic house in Iowa, United States

- U.S. National Register of Historic Places
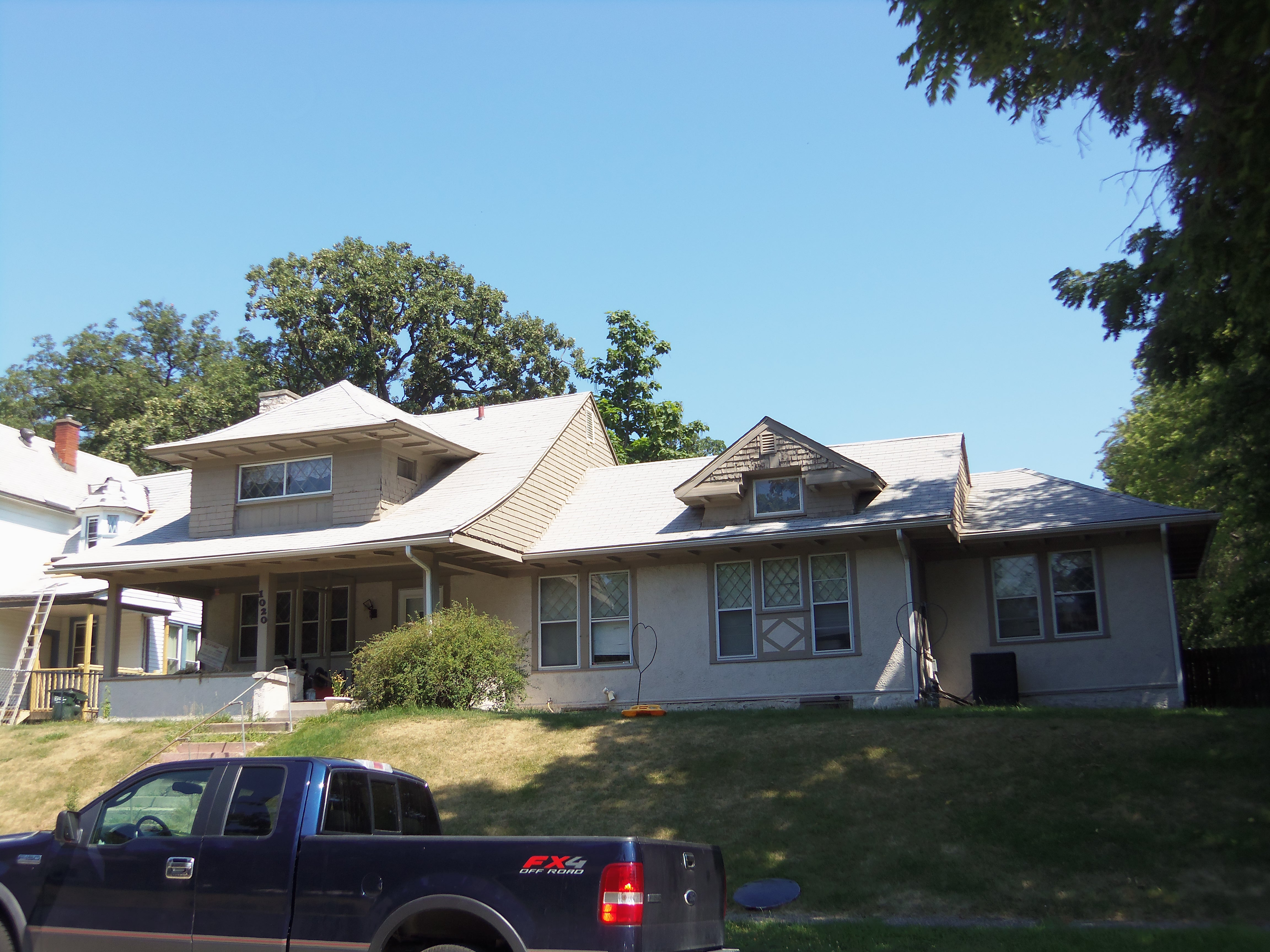

- Location within Iowa Location within the United States
- Location: 1020 E. 15th St. Davenport, Iowa
- Coordinates: 41°32′7″N 90°33′38″W
- Area: less than one acre
- Built: 1898
- Built by: Thomas M. Dils
- Architectural style: Shingle Style; Bungalow/Craftsman
- MPS: Davenport MRA
- NRHP reference No.: 83002422
- Added to NRHP: July 7, 1983

The Dils–Downer House is a historic building located on the eastside of Davenport, Iowa, United States. The Shingle Style Bungalow has been listed on the National Register of Historic Places since 1983.

== History ==
The house was built in 1898 by Thomas M. Dils, who was a local contractor and builder. He died in 1902 and his wife sold the house to Harry and Alice Downer. He worked as a school teacher and principal before he became a settlement house worker. Downer is most noteworthy for his two-volume historical work, History of Davenport and Scott County, Iowa. He resided in this house when he prepared and published the work in 1910.

== Architecture ==
The 1½-story structure is a side-gable Craftsman cottage with a long side wing. It features two dormers built in the Shingle Style. Many of the windows also feature diamond-shaped lights.
