= I. Edward Templeton House =

Historic house in Iowa, United States

- U.S. National Register of Historic Places
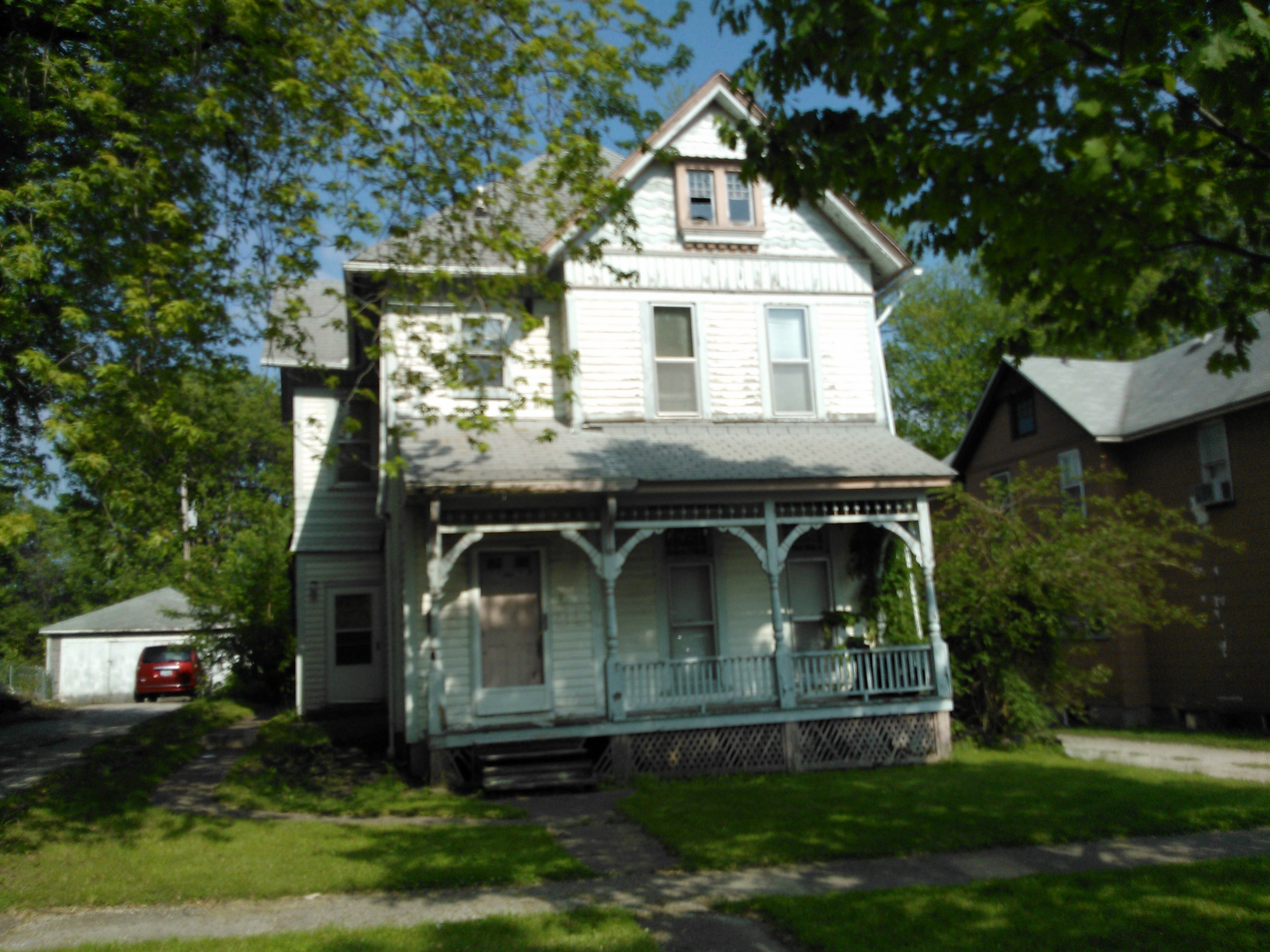

- Location within Iowa Location within the United States
- Location: 1315 Perry St. Davenport, Iowa
- Coordinates: 41°32′0″N 90°34′20″W
- Area: less than one acre
- Built: 1890
- Architectural style: Shingle Style
- MPS: Davenport MRA
- NRHP reference No.: 83002517
- Added to NRHP: July 7, 1983

The I. Edward Templeton House is a historic building located in the central part of Davenport, Iowa, United States. It has been listed on the National Register of Historic Places since 1983.

== History ==
This house was probably built for I. Edward Templeton, who was a conductor for the Chicago, Milwaukee and St. Paul Railroad. The 1890 structure is an example of an early mail order plan that was popular in the late 19th century. The plans, or in some cases the whole house, could be ordered from a catalogue or an advertisement found in newspapers or magazines.

== Architecture ==
The house is a simplified version of the Queen Anne style known as the Shingle Style. This structure is also an example of a "pinwheel" house. It is a two-story square box, with a pointed hipped roof, and gabled projections that are asymmetrically placed at the front and on the sides of the structure. The house also features an Eastlake porch, a variety of surface textures and stained glass transom lights.
