= Benjamin Nighswander House =

Historic house in Iowa, United States

- U.S. National Register of Historic Places
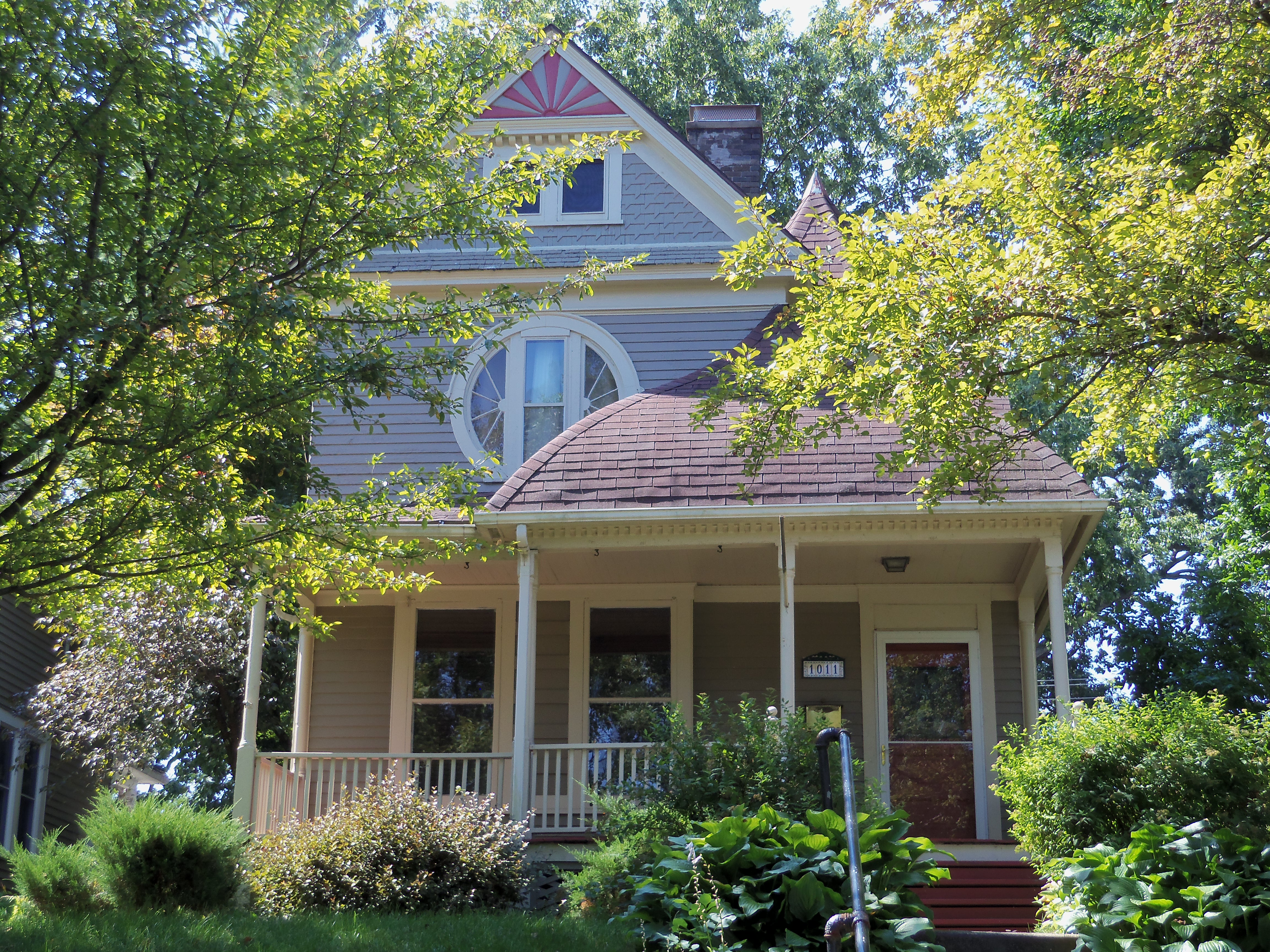

- Location within Iowa
- Location: 1011 Kirkwood Blvd. Davenport, Iowa
- Coordinates: 41°32′9″N 90°33′39″W
- Area: less than one acre
- Built: 1896
- Built by: Benjamin Nighswander
- Architectural style: Queen Anne
- MPS: Davenport MRA
- NRHP reference No.: 84001487
- Added to NRHP: July 27, 1984

The Benjamin Nighswander House is a historic building located on the east side of Davenport, Iowa, United States. The Queen Anne residence has been listed on the National Register of Historic Places since 1984.

== History ==
Benjamin Nighswander was a contractor and builder who built this house between 1895 and 1896. Nighswander himself lived across the alley from this house while it was being built. William Bryson occupied the house in 1898 and it suggests that Nighswander built it on speculation and not as his own use.

== Architecture ==
There are a few picturesque touches found on this house that distinguish it from the other houses in the neighborhood. The house is a frame structure that follows an L-plan with a front porch. The fanciful roofscape features a sweeping curve that extends over the porch. A small polygonal turret enhances the picturesque effect. Other noteworthy details include the gable-end shingling, the narrow, denticular belt coursing, and the second-floor window whose framing gives it a circular appearance.
