= Isaac Glaspell House =

Historic house in Iowa, United States

- U.S. National Register of Historic Places
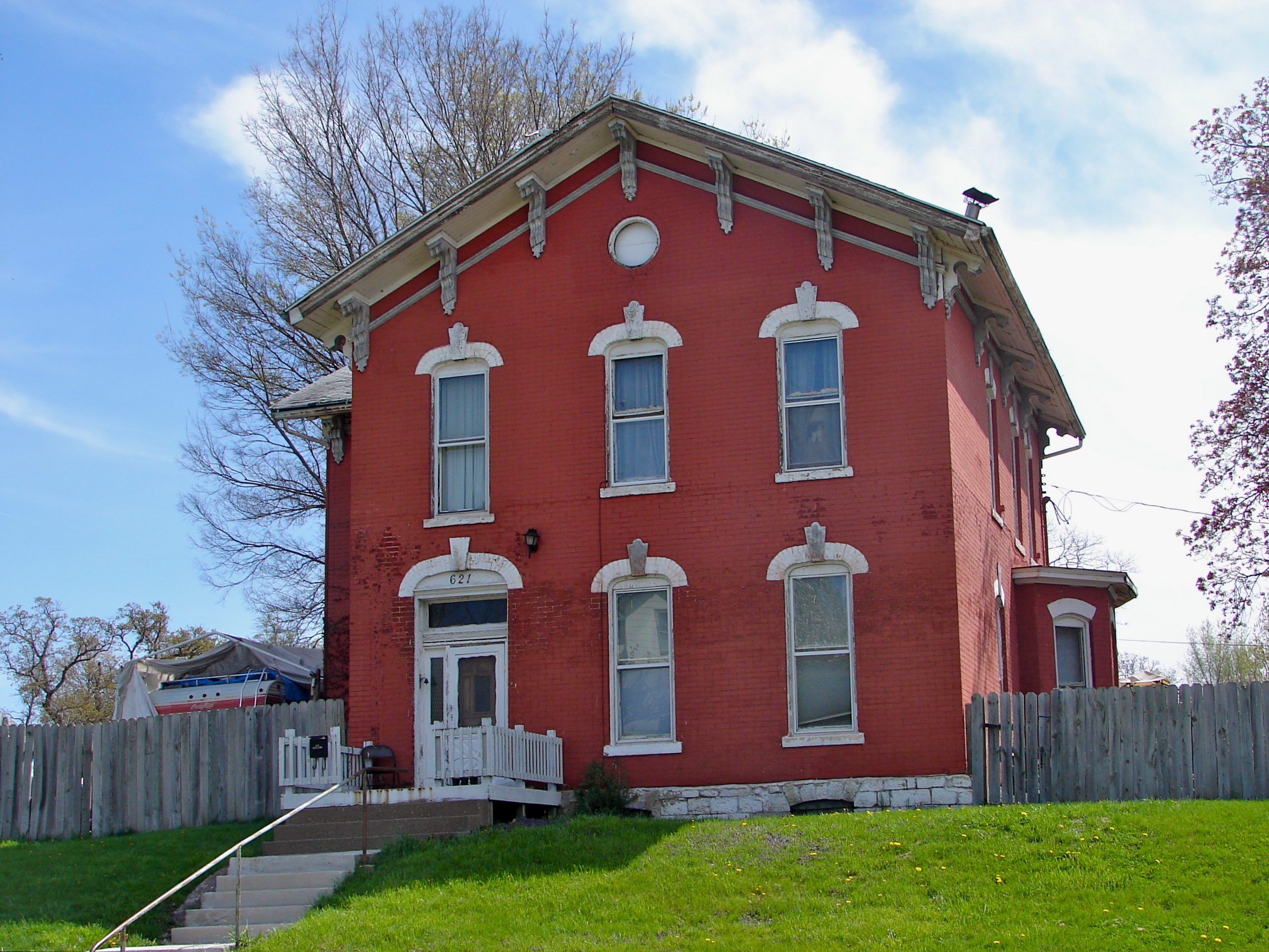

- Location within Iowa Location within the United States
- Location: 621 LeClaire St. Davenport, Iowa
- Coordinates: 41°31′34″N 90°34′4″W
- Area: less than one acre
- Built: 1875
- Built by: John Whitaker
- Architectural style: Greek Revival
- MPS: Davenport MRA
- NRHP reference No.: 83002439
- Added to NRHP: July 7, 1983

The Isaac Glaspell House is a historic building located on the east side of Davenport, Iowa, United States. Isaac Glaspell was a local grocer in the 1870s and 1880s and had this Greek Revival house built during that time. It is a two-story structure that features a front gable, three bay façade, with a single bay side wing. The exterior is composed of brick with stone and wood trims. The house is a vernacular form of the Greek Revival style found in Davenport. The notable details on this house are the bracketed eaves and the flat arch window heads that are topped by keystone brick hoods. The house had at least one wrap-around porch that was believed to have been added around the turn of the 20th century. It may have replaced an earlier porch, but it is no longer extant. The house sits on a raised lot. It has been listed on the National Register of Historic Places since 1983.
