= James Cawley House =

Historic house in Iowa, United States

- U.S. National Register of Historic Places
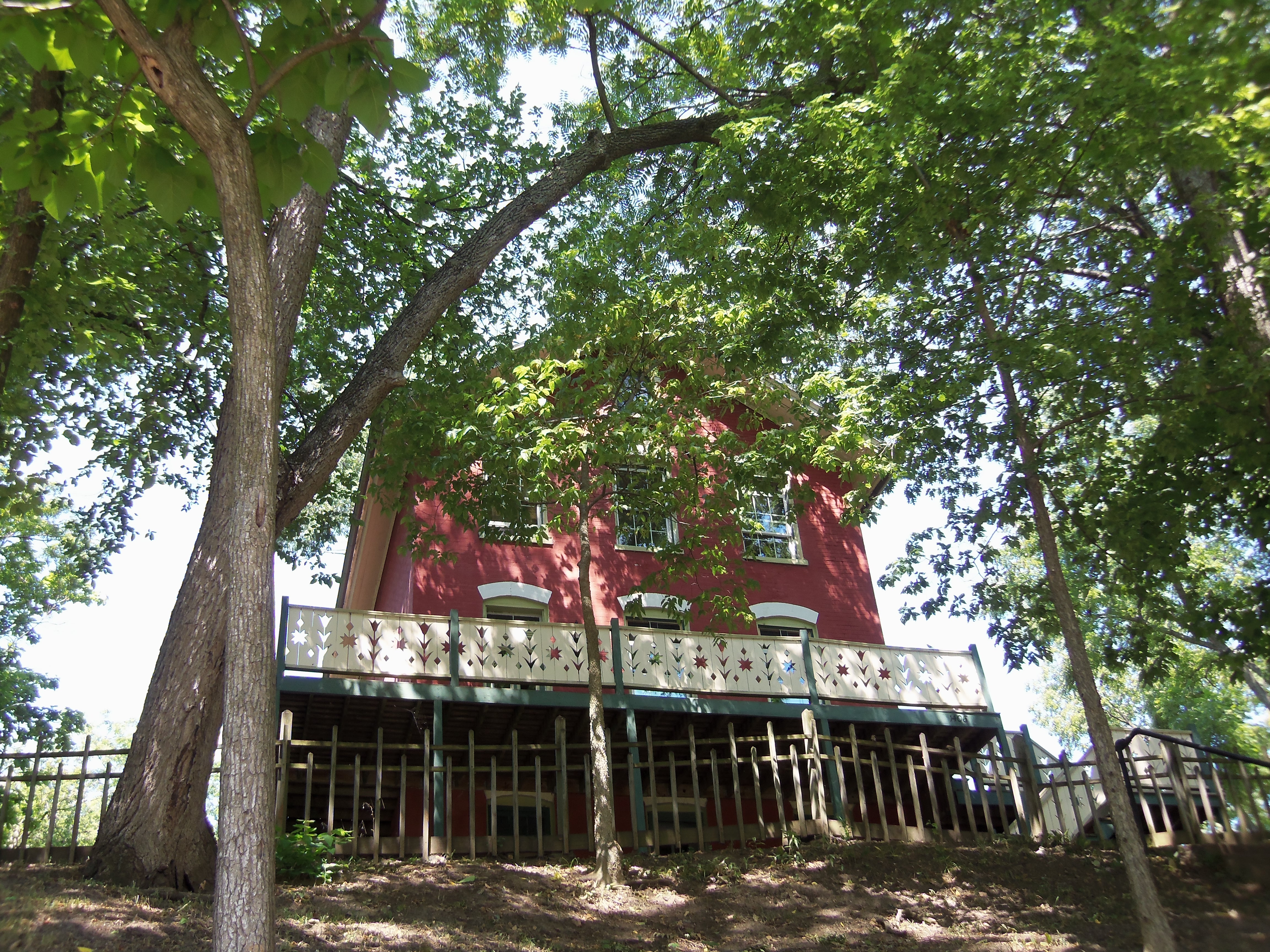

- Location within Iowa Location within the United States
- Location: 1406 Esplanade, Davenport, Iowa
- Coordinates: 41°32′3″N 90°33′20″W
- Area: 1 acre (0.40 ha)
- Built: 1876
- Architectural style: Vernacular (McClelland)
- MPS: Davenport MRA
- NRHP reference No.: 84001326
- Added to NRHP: July 27, 1984

The James Cawley House is a historic house located on the eastside of Davenport, Iowa, United States. James Cawley was a bricklayer who had this house built in 1876. His wife continued to live here into the 1890s after his death. The house follows a popular Vernacular style of architecture from the mid to late 19th-century Davenport known as the McClelland style. The unusual feature of this house in comparison to other examples in the city is the bank construction that allows for a walk-in basement on the front of the house. It is also one of the few McClelland style houses found in the Fulton Addition. Otherwise, the two-story brick house features a three-bay front-gabled form and rectangular shape, both elements typical of the style. The large porch on the front is not original to the house. The residence was listed on the National Register of Historic Places in 1984.
