= J.W. Stewart House =

Historic house in Iowa, United States

- U.S. National Register of Historic Places
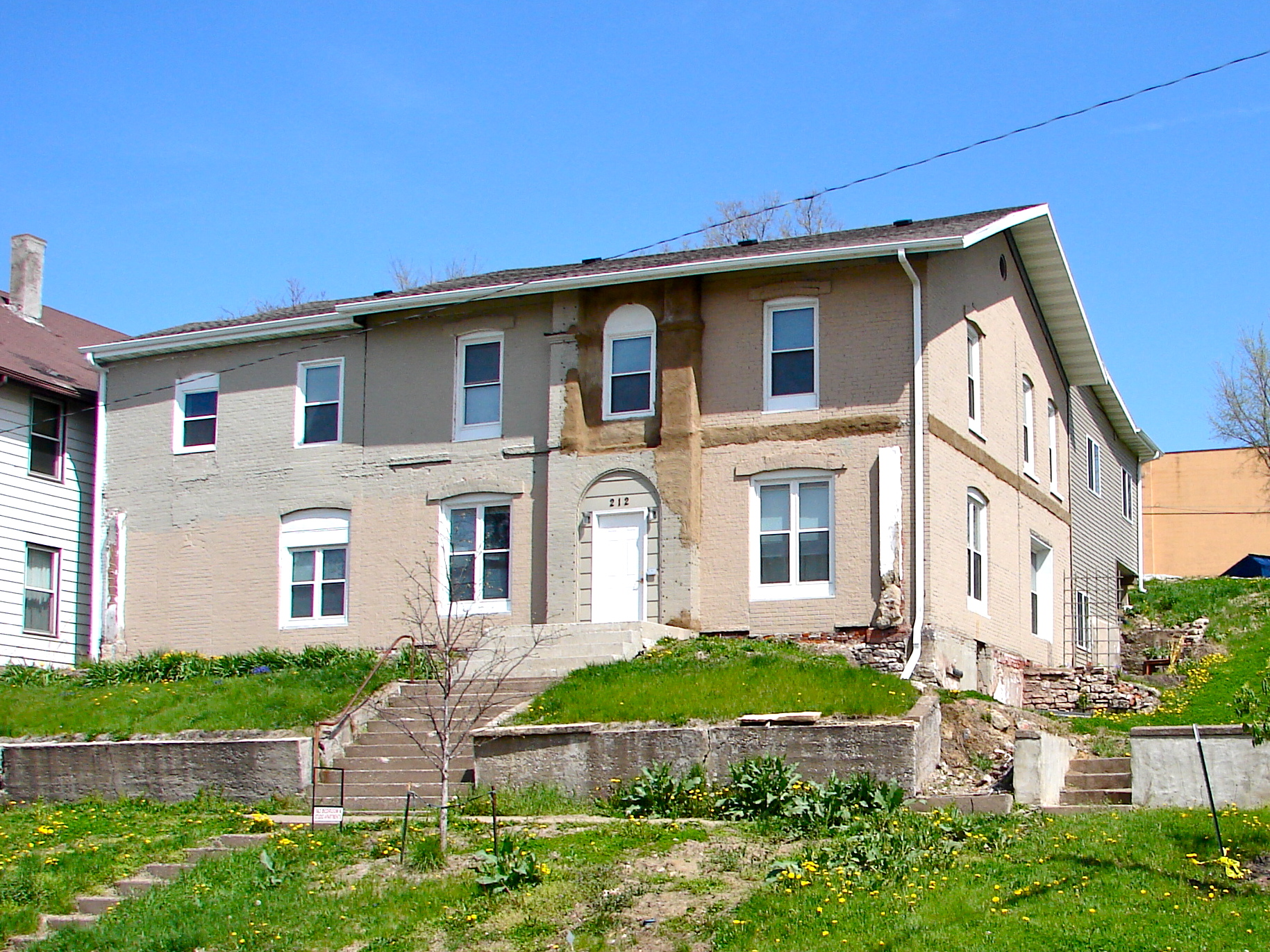

- Location within Iowa Location within the United States
- Location: 212 E. 6th St. Davenport, Iowa
- Coordinates: 41°31′33″N 90°34′19″W
- Area: less than one acre
- Built: 1865
- Architectural style: Italianate
- MPS: Davenport MRA
- NRHP reference No.: 83002513
- Added to NRHP: July 7, 1983

The J.W. Stewart House is a historic building located on the east side of Davenport, Iowa, United States. It has been listed on the National Register of Historic Places since 1983. J.W. Stewart, a partner in the law firm of Stewart and White, had this house built in 1865. The house was constructed in the Italianate style, but it has been substantially altered in the intervening years. It is now missing its front porch, which ran the width of the main elevation. It was dated from the early 20th-century. It is also missing a pair of short columns on high pedestals and an arched corbel table that framed the arched window on the second floor above the entrance. The round-arch entry way and the windows have also been altered.
