= Theodore Eldridge House =

Historic house in Iowa, United States

- U.S. National Register of Historic Places
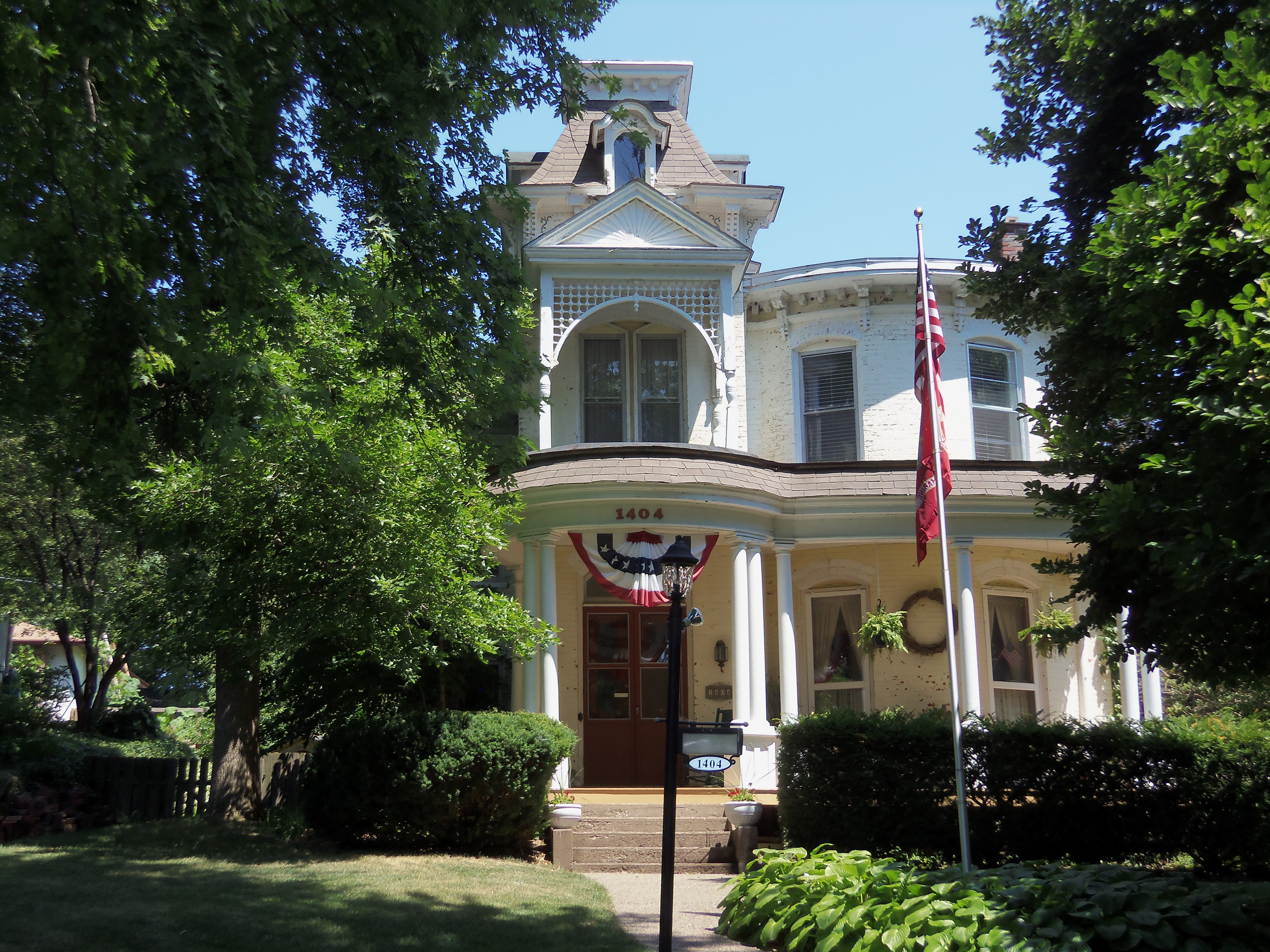

- Location within Iowa Location within the United States
- Location: 1404 E. 10th St. Davenport, Iowa
- Coordinates: 41°31′49″N 90°33′16″W
- Area: less than one acre
- Built: 1878
- Architectural style: Italianate
- MPS: Davenport MRA
- NRHP reference No.: 84001404
- Added to NRHP: July 27, 1984

The Theodore Eldridge House is a historic building located on the east side of Davenport, Iowa, United States. It has been listed on the National Register of Historic Places since 1984.

== History ==
Theodore Eldridge was a cousin of early Davenport settler and land speculator D.C. Eldridge. Theodore operated a restaurant and confectionery downtown where he lived upstairs until moving here in 1878.

== Architecture ==
The Theodore Eldridge house is one of several Italianate style houses in Davenport that follow the Villa form of the style. It combines the rectangular shape and hipped roof of the basic style with a Villa-style tower. The most unusual feature of this house is its bowed front wall. It suggests the work of one of Davenport's first professional architects Willet Carroll.
