= Rowhouses at 702-712 Kirkwood Boulevard =

- U.S. National Register of Historic Places
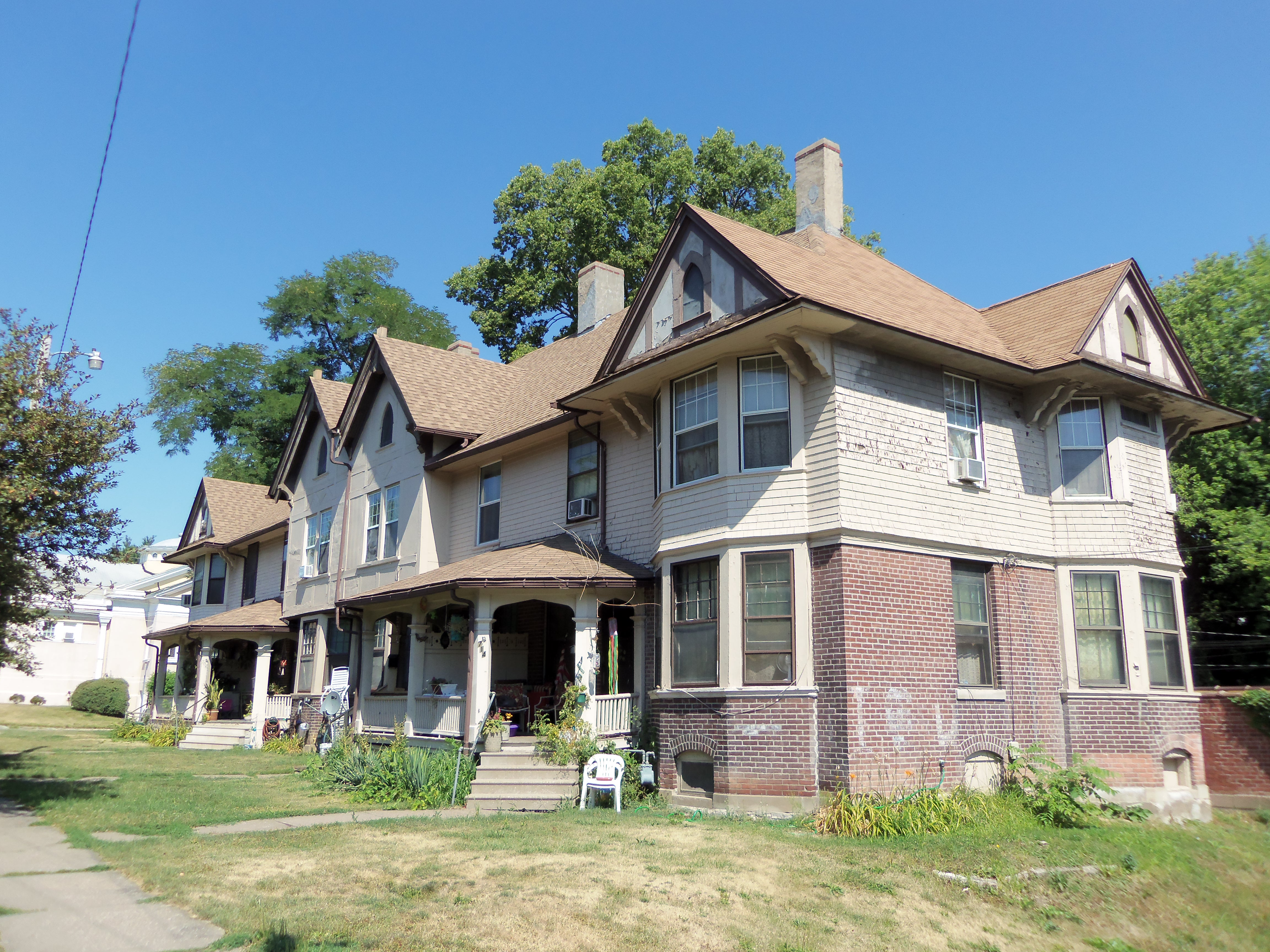

- Location within Iowa Location within the United States
- Location: 702-712 Kirkwood Blvd; Davenport, Iowa
- Coordinates: 41°32′11″N 90°35′52″W
- Area: 1 acre (0.40 ha)
- Built: 1905
- Architectural style: Tudor Revival
- MPS: Davenport MRA
- NRHP reference No.: 84001535
- Added to NRHP: July 27, 1984

The Rowhouses at 702-712 Kirkwood Boulevard is a historic building located on the east side of Davenport, Iowa, United States. The Tudor Revival structure has been listed on the National Register of Historic Places since 1984.

== History ==
This four-unit rowhouse was completed in 1905. Working class couples were the first occupants of the units. The heads of household of the four families were Bela Nagy, who worked as a draughtsman at Davenport Machine & Foundry; Albert Katz, who was the vice president of the Why Clothing Company; Rufus Scott, who worked for the Chicago, Rock Island & Pacific Railroad; and Norman Godfrey, who was the secretary of the Mississippi River Sash & Door Association.

== Architecture ==
Buildings that housed more than one family were built in Davenport by at least the Civil War. Although they were larger and had more entrances, rowhouses and duplexes built in the 19th-century generally resembled single-family homes. Around 1900 apartment buildings of three or more stories were built along more "urban" lines. The rowhouses that were built after the turn of the 20th-century tended to resemble rows of commercial blocks. This rowhouse returned to the earlier practice of building multi-family housing that resembled a single-family dwelling. It follows the English Tudor style that was popular in domestic architecture at that time in Davenport. The prominent gables indicate the location of the individual units.
