= Henry Ockershausen House =

Historic house in Iowa, United States

- U.S. National Register of Historic Places
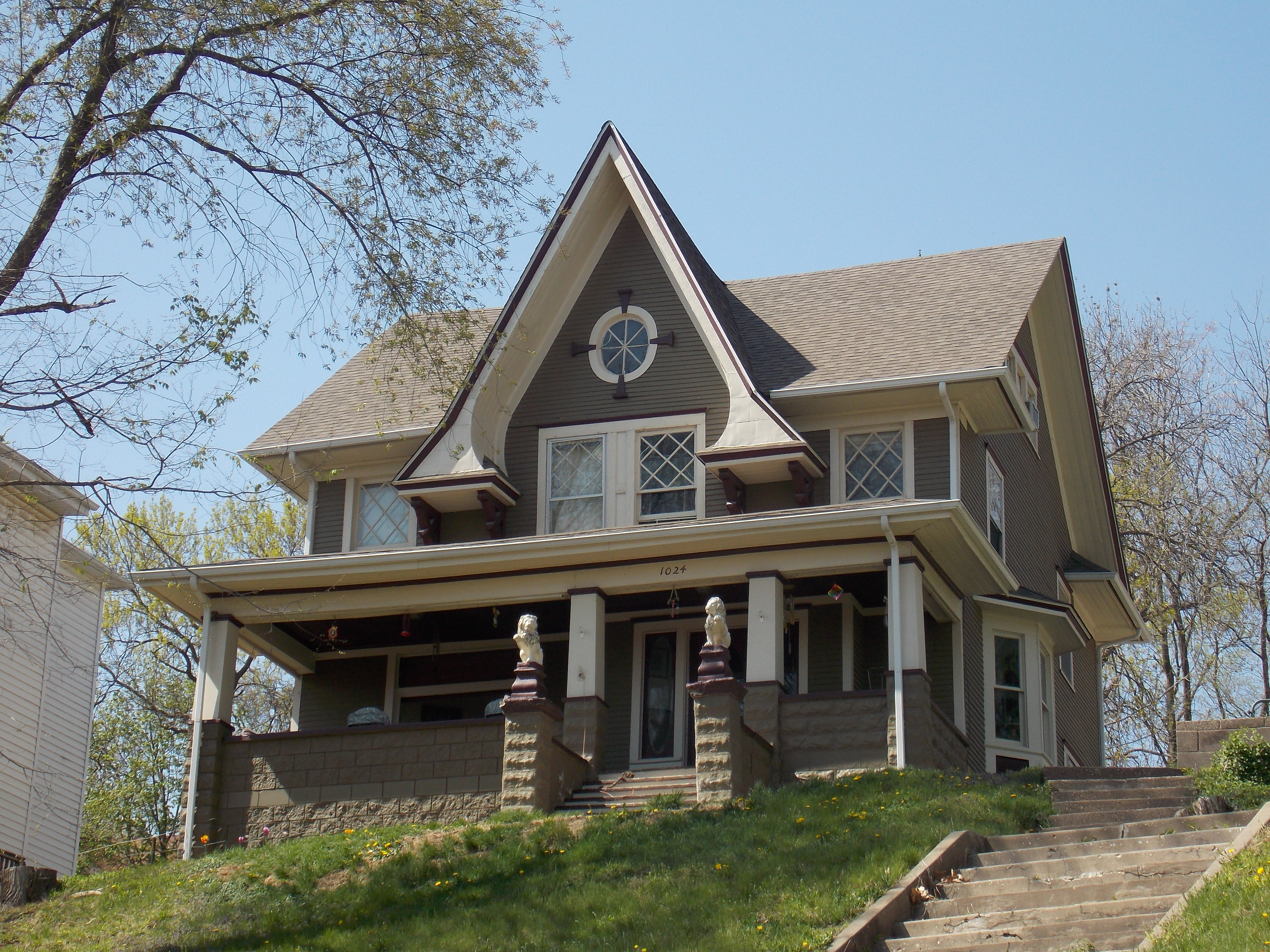

- Location within Iowa Location within the United States
- Location: 1024 Charlotte St. Davenport, Iowa
- Coordinates: 41°31′39.6″N 90°33′33.04″W
- Area: less than one acre
- Built: 1908
- Architectural style: Queen Anne; Colonial Revival
- MPS: Davenport MRA
- NRHP reference No.: 84001495
- Added to NRHP: April 5, 1984

The Henry Ockershausen House is a historic building located in a residential-light industrial neighborhood on the east side of Davenport, Iowa, United States. It has been listed on the National Register of Historic Places since 1984.

== History ==
Henry Ockershausen worked as a bank clerk at Citizen's National Bank and later at the German Savings Bank. He and his wife Minnie had this house built in 1908. It is located in a section of the city that had been destroyed in the East Davenport Fire of 1901.

== Architecture ==
The Henry Ockershausen House is a 2½-story, frame structure with a steep side-gable roof and a large front gable. It exemplifies the transition from the Queen Anne style, which was popular in the late 19th-century, to the Colonial Revival style that became popular in the early 20th-century. Its verticality in form, especially the large wall dormer in the center of the main facade, is from the Queen Anne style. The dormer's soffits curve inward and meet the partially returned cornices. Its verticality is enhanced from its location on the crest of a hill, which naturally draws the observer's eye upward. Various decorative elements suggest the Colonial Revival style. A large Adamesque oval window is located in the center of the wall dormer on the front, and there is a tall glass oval window at the main entrance. The full-length porch on the front of the house is built on a rock-faced stone foundation. It is noteworthy for the two lion statues on pedestals at the base of the steps.
