= Shields Woolen Mill =

- U.S. National Register of Historic Places
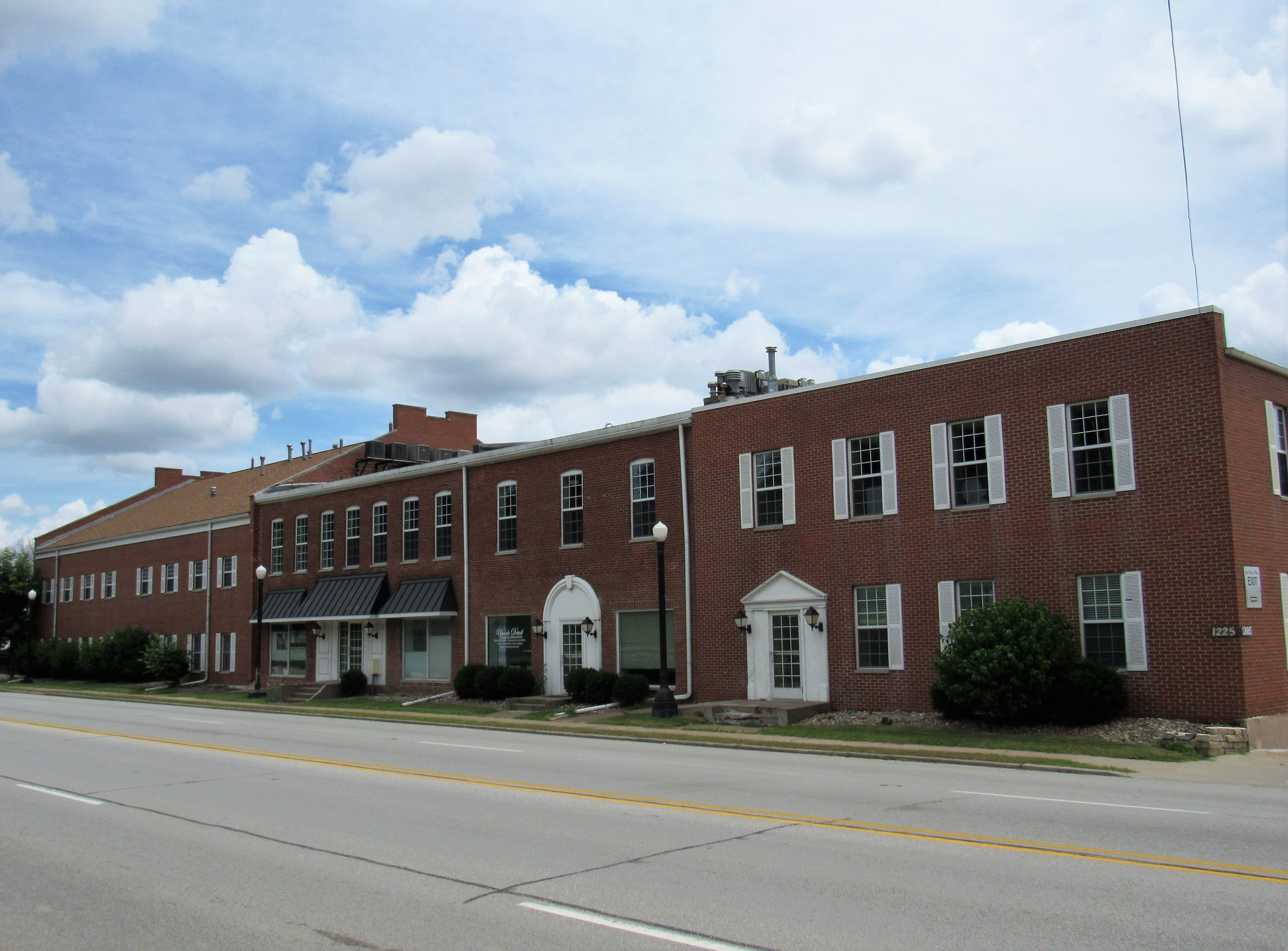

- Location within Iowa Location within the United States
- Location: 1235 E. River Drive; Davenport, Iowa
- Coordinates: 41°31′37″N 90°33′23″W
- Area: 1.5 acres (0.61 ha)
- Built: 1863-1868
- MPS: Davenport MRA
- NRHP reference No.: 83002504
- Added to NRHP: July 7, 1983

Shields Woolen Mill is located along the edge of the Mississippi River in Davenport, Iowa, United States. It has been listed on the National Register of Historic Places since 1983. The building has been repurposed as commercial and office space called One River Place.

== History ==
Because the Civil War cut off cotton supplies from the southern states, wool increased in popularity in the North. To take advantage of the situation Joseph Shields established Shields Woolen Mills in 1863. By 1870 he employed 52 people and the annual production value of the mill was $36,000, which made it the sixth largest industry in Davenport.

Several fires and financial problems caused Shield's problems and he committed suicide in 1878. By 1881 the business was reorganized as the Davenport Woolen Mills. In the 1890s the mill employed 140 people and its product line included clothing, cashmere, flannels, and blankets. It would be the high point of the company, however. As the sheep herds moved further west the production of woolen goods moved with them. The company's financial situation rose and fell and it finally closed in 1914.

== Architecture ==
This two-story industrial building has both shallow side gable and flat roofs. It is constructed in brick with a stone foundation and basement, which is exposed on the south elevation of the building. Segmental arch windows predominate throughout the structure. The middle section with the pedimented entrance is the original section of the building that was completed in 1863. Additions were made to the structure with the last one added in 1868. It is located in an old milling district along the Mississippi River. This is thought to be the oldest structure still standing in Davenport that was designed for steam-operated industrial use.
