= McBride–Hickey House =

Historic house in Iowa, United States

- U.S. National Register of Historic Places
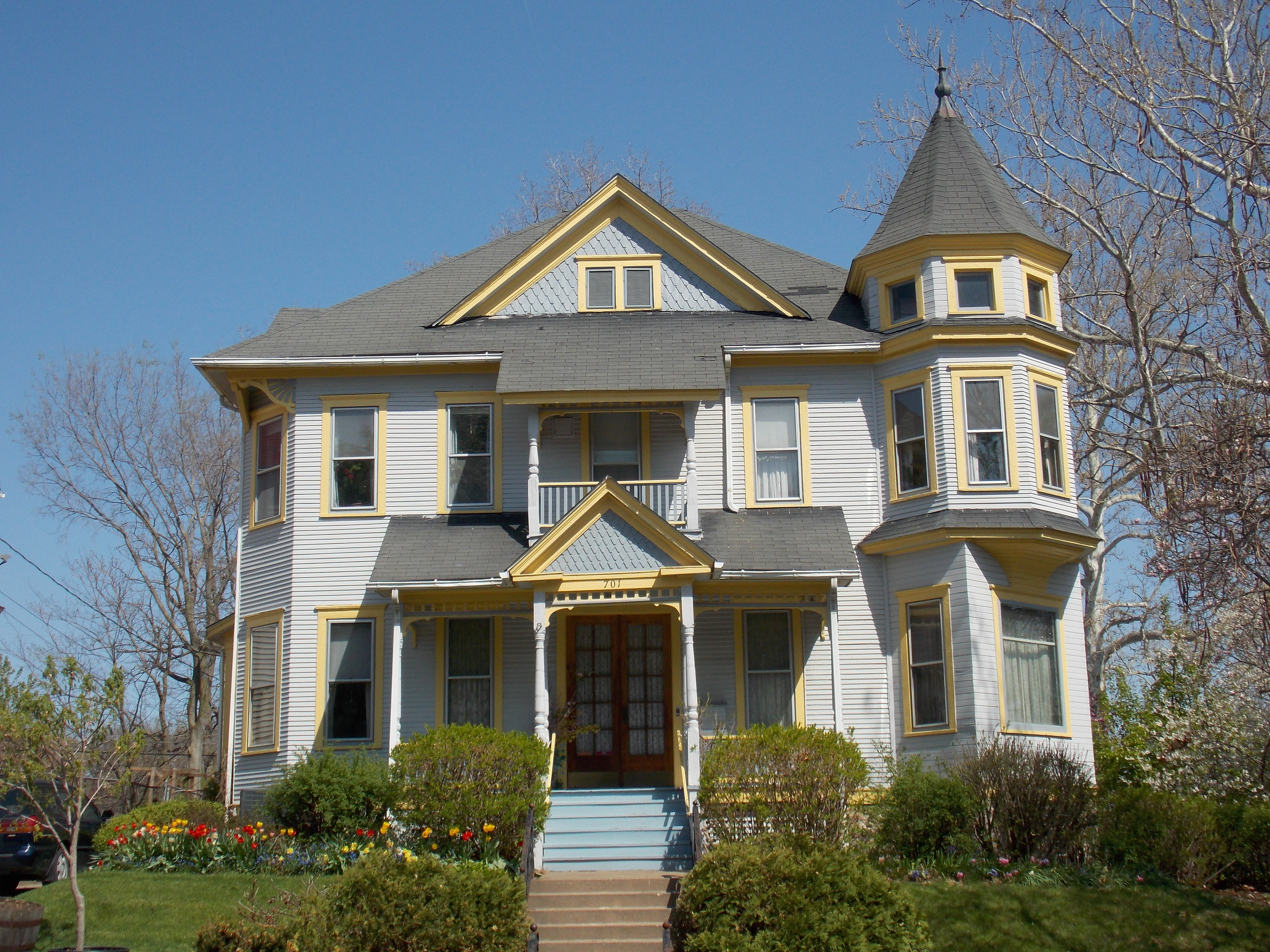

- Location within Iowa Location within the United States
- Location: 701 Iowa St. Davenport, Iowa
- Coordinates: 41°31′37″N 90°34′10″W
- Area: less than one acre
- Built: 1890
- Architectural style: Late Victorian; Late 19th and 20th Century Revivals
- MPS: Davenport MRA
- NRHP reference No.: 83002467
- Added to NRHP: July 7, 1983

The McBride–Hickey House is a historic building located on the east side of Davenport, Iowa, United States. It has been listed on the National Register of Historic Places since 1983.

== History ==
Patrick and Agatha McBride had this house built in 1890. Beginning in 1865 Patrick, an Irish immigrant, operated a grocery store in the city. After his death, Agatha sold the house in 1902 to Dennis J. Hickey, Sr. His two sons, Dennis Jr. and William, owned a wholesale and retail cigar company named Hickey Brothers. They resided in the house as well. William served as president and treasurer of the company and Dennis was the vice-president and secretary. The company was organized in 1901 with a single store. By 1905 they had several local stores and before the start of World War II it had grown into a company that did $2 million in business with 46 stores across the United States. It grew to 55 retail shops that operated in hotels and small shops by 1941. Eight years later they operated 120 stores in the United States and Cuba. The company headquarters remained in Davenport.

== Architecture ==
The McBride–Hickey House exemplifies the stylistic transition that happened in architecture in Davenport at the turn of the 20th century. The main block of the structure features a symmetrical, five-bay facade. The placement of the center bay, porch, and roof dormer contribute to the symmetry and suggest the Georgian Revival style. The asymmetry of Victorian architecture is found in the polygonal bays and a 3-stage corner tower. The Eastlake style porch and shingled dormer also add interest to what is basically a Georgian Colonial Revival facade.
