= Frank J. Von Ach House =

Historic house in Iowa, United States

- U.S. National Register of Historic Places
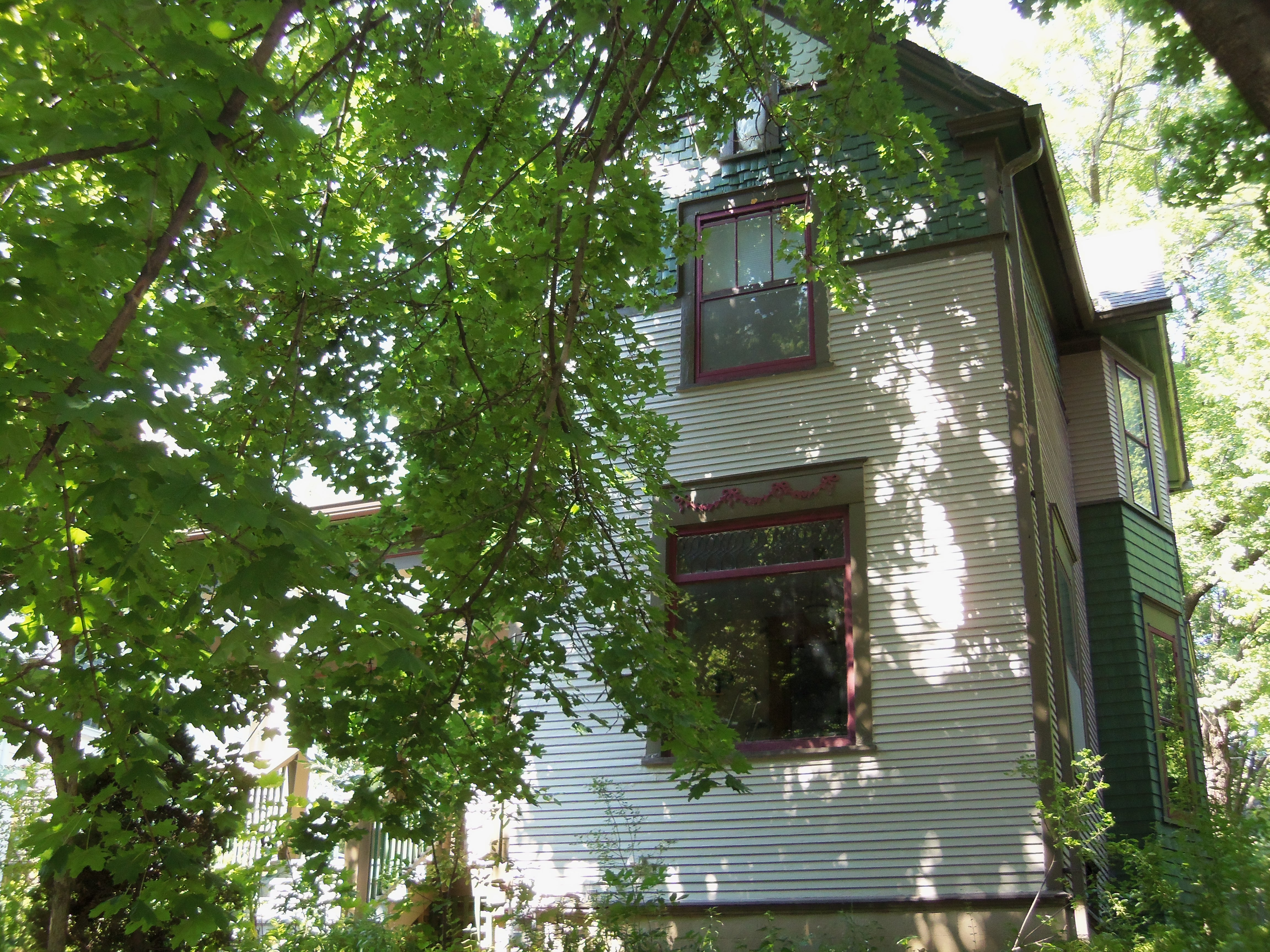

- Location within Iowa Location within the United States
- Location: 1618 Davenport St. Davenport, Iowa
- Coordinates: 41°32′4″N 90°35′42″W
- Area: less than one acre
- Built: 1896
- Architectural style: Queen Anne; Colonial Revival
- MPS: Davenport MRA
- NRHP reference No.: 84001579
- Added to NRHP: July 27, 1984

The Frank J. Von Ach House is a historic building located on the east side of Davenport, Iowa, United States. It has been listed on the National Register of Historic Places since 1984.

== History ==
Francis J. Von Ach was a traveling salesman for the August Steffen Company, a wholesale dry goods dealer. Prior to his association with Steffen, he worked as a salesman in smaller retail establishments. Von Ach was also a founder, and held leadership positions in, the Tri-City Travelers Association, which was a professional organization for traveling salesmen. Von Ach was the first occupant of this house.

== Architecture ==
The Von Ach house is a combination of the Queen Anne and the Colonial Revival styles. This combination was popular in turn of the 20th-century in Davenport. The Queen Anne style is found in the pinwheel plan, the variety of surface textures employed, and the irregular window placement. What is essentially a Victorian style structure is modified by the addition of the Neoclassical style porch, the aedicular frame surrounding the main entrance, and the Adamesque decorative details of the Colonial Revival.
