= McKinney House =

Historic house in Iowa, United States

- U.S. National Register of Historic Places
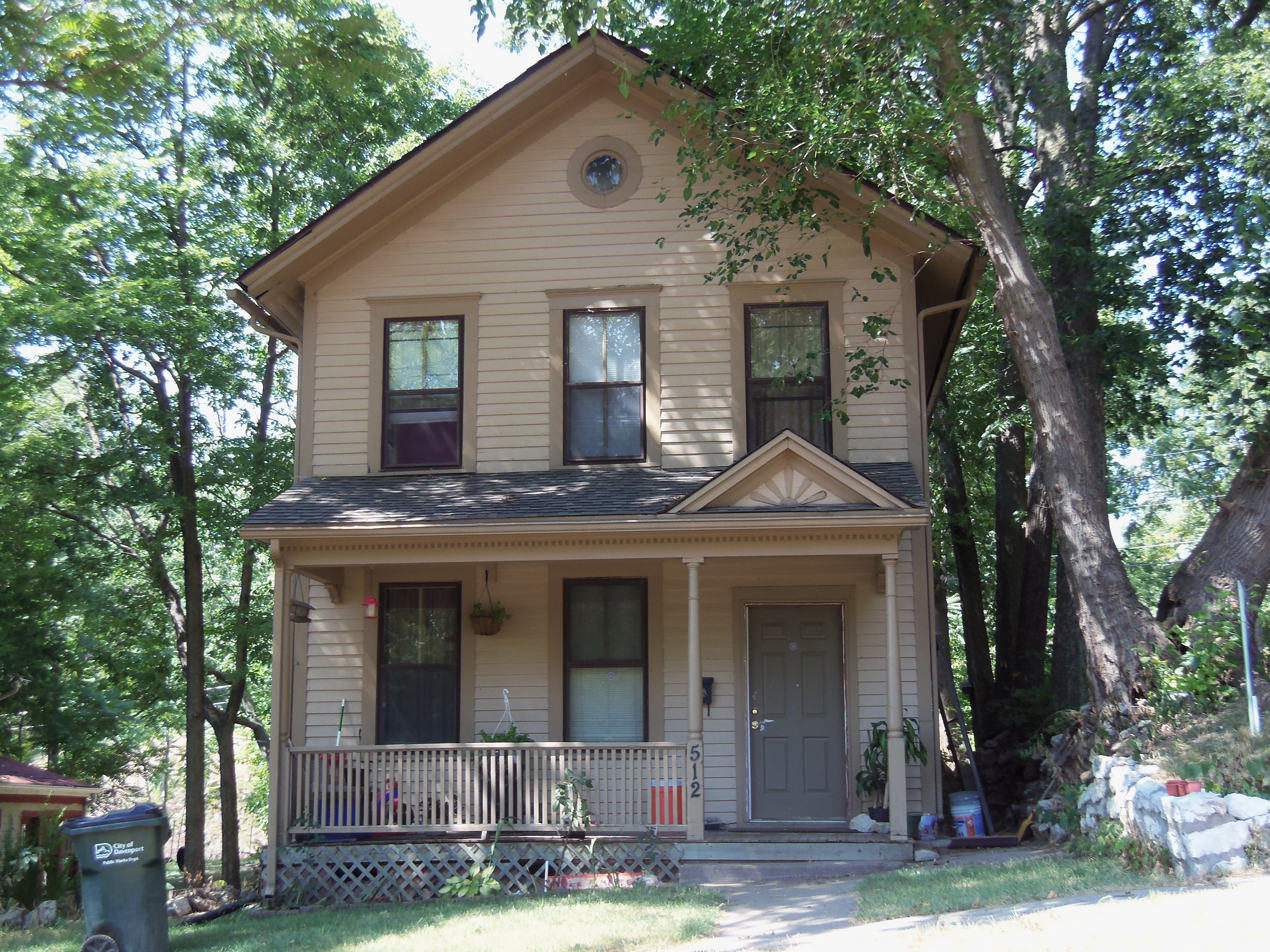

- Location within Iowa Location within the United States
- Location: 512 E. 8th St. Davenport, Iowa
- Coordinates: 41°31′41″N 90°34′4″W
- Area: less than one acre
- Built: 1872
- Architectural style: Greek Revival
- MPS: Davenport MRA
- NRHP reference No.: 83002468
- Added to NRHP: July 7, 1983

The McKinney House is a historic building located on the east side of Davenport, Iowa, United States. William McKinny built this house in 1872 in a neighborhood that was largely populated by Irish immigrants and their descendants. The house remained in the family until after 1900. This house exemplifies a vernacular form of the Greek Revival style that was popular in Davenport. The sunburst design on the porch's pediment is the only decorative element on what is a simple structure. There is also an oculus on the gable end. The house has been listed on the National Register of Historic Places since 1983.
