= Warner Apartment Building =

- U.S. National Register of Historic Places
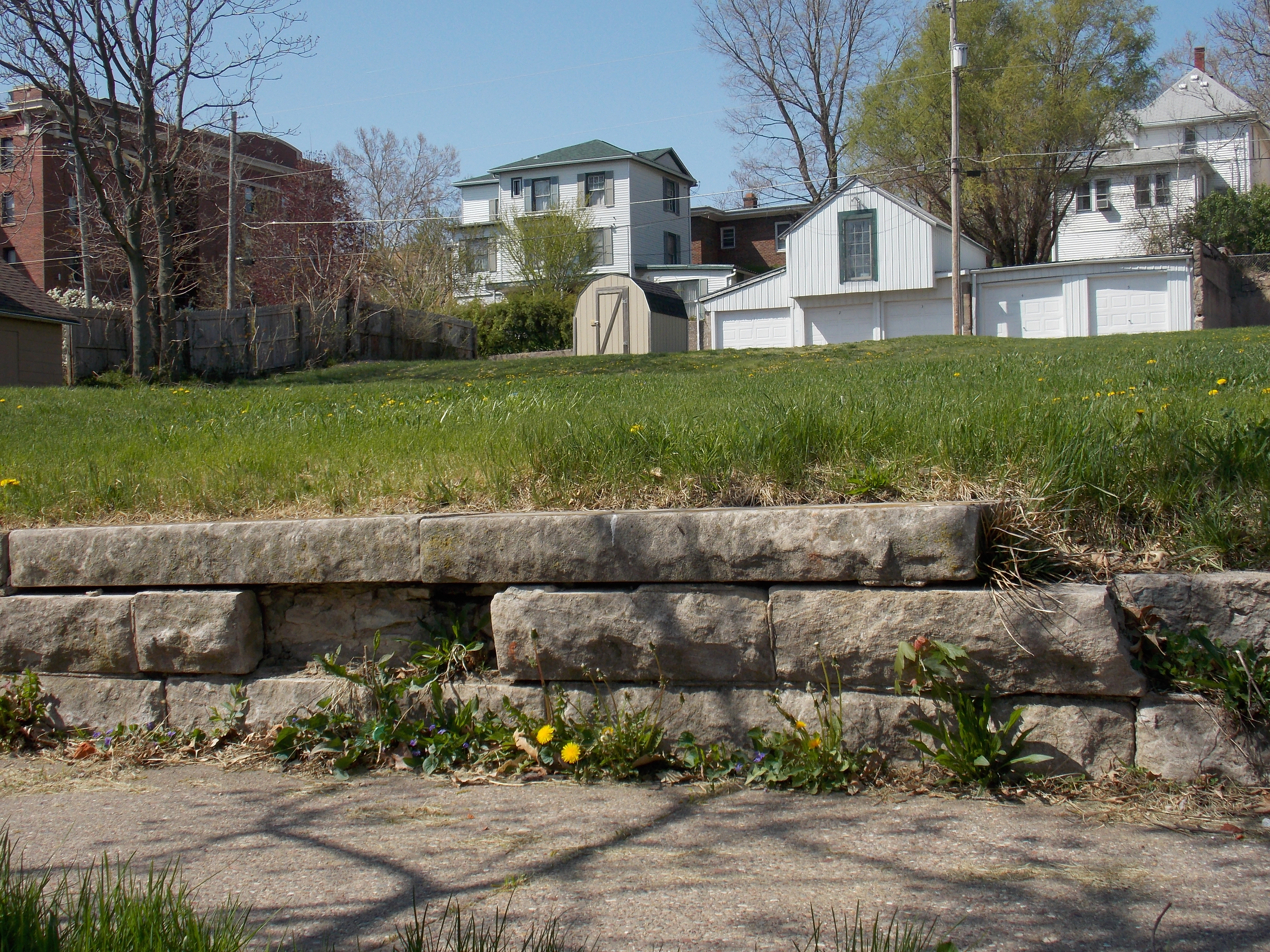
- The stone retaining wall along the sidewalk where the building was located.

- Location within Iowa Location within the United States
- Location: 414-416 E. 6th St. Davenport, Iowa
- Coordinates: 41°31′34″N 90°34′8″W
- Area: less than one acre
- Built: 1900
- Architectural style: Tudor Revival
- MPS: Davenport MRA
- NRHP reference No.: 83002523
- Added to NRHP: July 7, 1983

The Warner Apartment Building was a historic building located on the east side of Davenport, Iowa, United States. Dr. Fay L. Warner, a dentist, had the structure built in 1900 and lived here himself until 1908. A relative of his, Fred Warner, lived here in later years and managed the building. The three-story brick structure was one of the most distinguished apartment blocks in Davenport. The building featured a picturesque façade that was typical of Victorian era architecture. The round arch entrances were below ogee-arched moldings. At the top was a deep corbelled cornice frieze. The five sections of the main façade were articulated by full-height octagonal bays. The building was also banded by flat and projecting string courses. The structure was on a raised lot and had a low, stone retaining wall at the sidewalk. It was listed on the National Register of Historic Places in 1983, and has subsequently been demolished.
