= Ball–Waterman House =

Historic house in Iowa, United States

- U.S. National Register of Historic Places
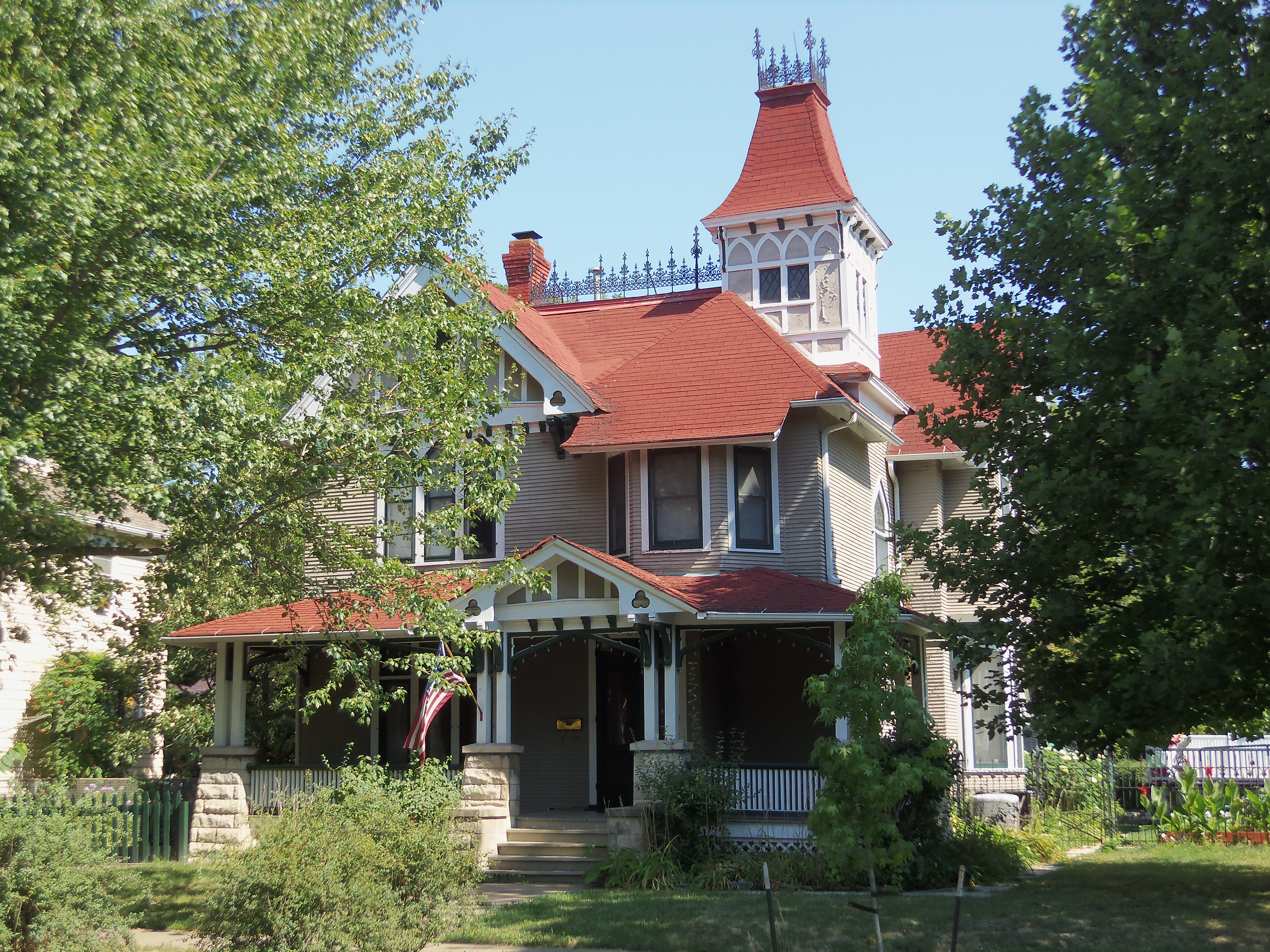

- Location within Iowa Location within the United States
- Location: 616 Kirkwood Boulevard; Davenport, Iowa
- Coordinates: 41°32′11″N 90°33′57″W
- Area: less than one acre
- Built: c. 1880
- Architectural style: Late Victorian; Tudor Revival
- MPS: Davenport MRA
- NRHP reference No.: 84001315
- Added to NRHP: July 27, 1984

The Ball–Waterman House is a historic building located on the eastside of Davenport, Iowa, United States. It has been listed on the National Register of Historic Places since 1984.

== History ==
It is believed that J.W. Ball built this house in 1880. It was purchased in 1893 by C. M. Waterman who was a circuit court judge at the time. In 1898, he became an associate justice of the Iowa Supreme Court. Waterman joined the prominent local law firm of Lane & Waterman in 1902. The Waterman's continued to live here until the 1920s.

== Architecture ==
The 2½-story frame house rests on a masonry foundation. It follows an irregular plan with a multi-gabled roof and a tower. These features are typical of the Queen Anne style. Iron roof crestings are found on the tower and across the peak of the roof. Another feature of interest is the polygonal bay window that sits below an overhanging gabled pavilion. A full veranda with stone pedestals covers the front of the house. The half-timbered gable ends and the arches on the veranda are typical of the Tudor Revival style that became popular in Davenport in the 1890s. It is believed that the Waterman's added these features after they bought the house. What is unusual here is that when a Queen Anne house was updated in Davenport it was typical that features found in the Neoclassical style were used and not those from other styles.
