= Jacob Quickel House =

Historic house in Iowa, United States

- U.S. National Register of Historic Places
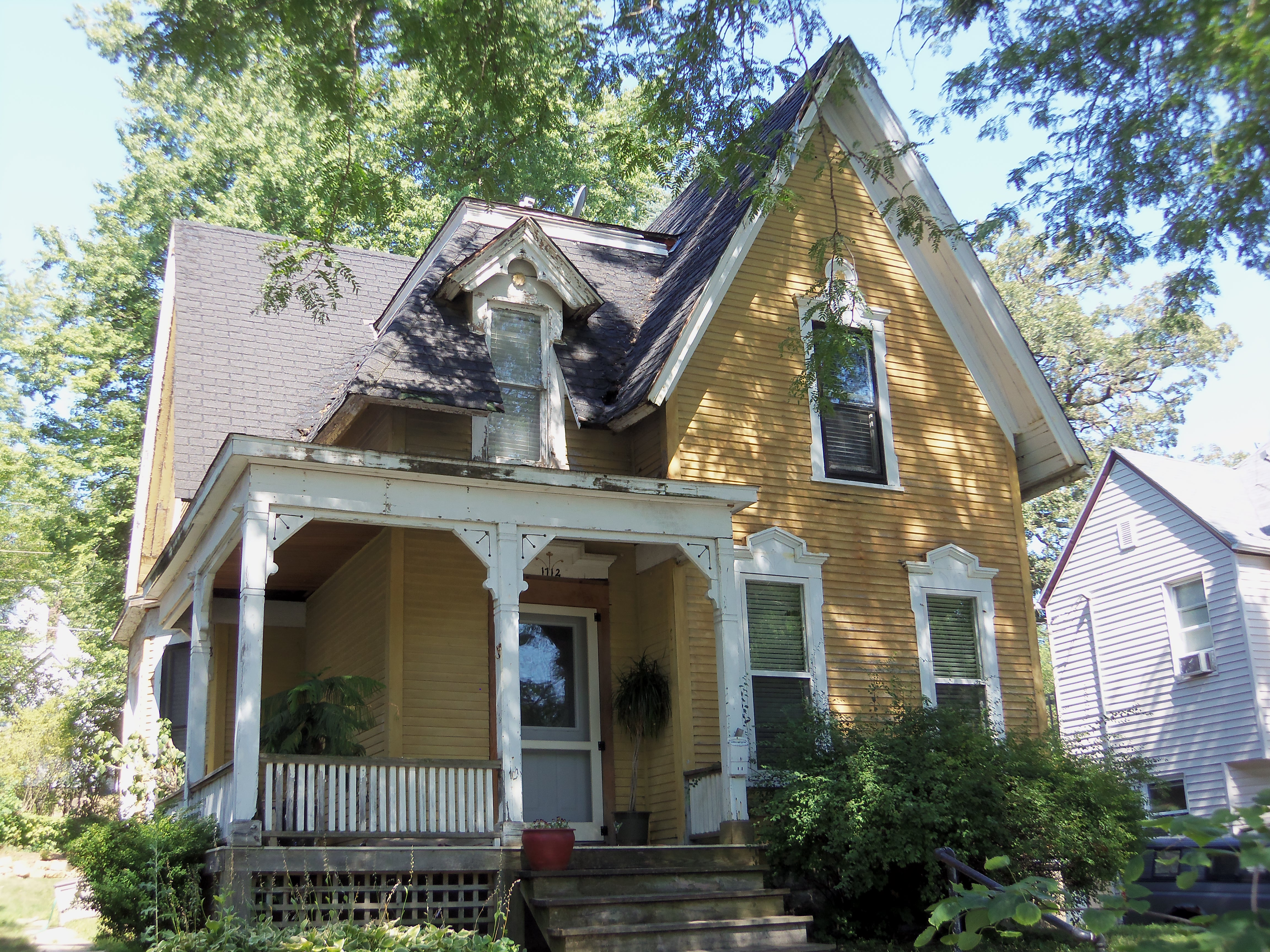

- Location within Iowa Location within the United States
- Location: 1712 Davenport St. Davenport, Iowa
- Coordinates: 41°32′14″N 90°33′24″W
- Area: less than one acre
- Built: 1880
- Architectural style: Late Gothic Revival
- MPS: Davenport MRA
- NRHP reference No.: 84001524
- Added to NRHP: July 27, 1984

The Jacob Quickel House is a historic building located on the east side of Davenport, Iowa, United States. It has been listed on the National Register of Historic Places since 1984.

== History ==
The Late Gothic Revival style residence was built in 1880. Jacob Quickel, who worked as a cutter at the Rock Island Arsenal, began living here in 1902. He is the earliest known person to reside here. C. Rollin Marks, who worked as a clerk at his family's business, the Security Fire Insurance Company, bought the house in 1907.

== Architecture ==
This is a rare Gothic Revival style house in Davenport. The style is realized in the very steep and narrow gables. It is also found in the strongly-shaped vergeboards, porch and window details, which all give the structure a rectilinear feeling. This is typical of the Late Gothic Revival in contrast to the earlier expression of the style, which is conveyed in its use of curves. The two-story frame house was built on a rock-faced stone foundation. It features a cross-gable plan and a porch that wraps around the front and the south side.
