= Isaac W. Harrison House =

Historic house in Iowa, United States

- U.S. National Register of Historic Places
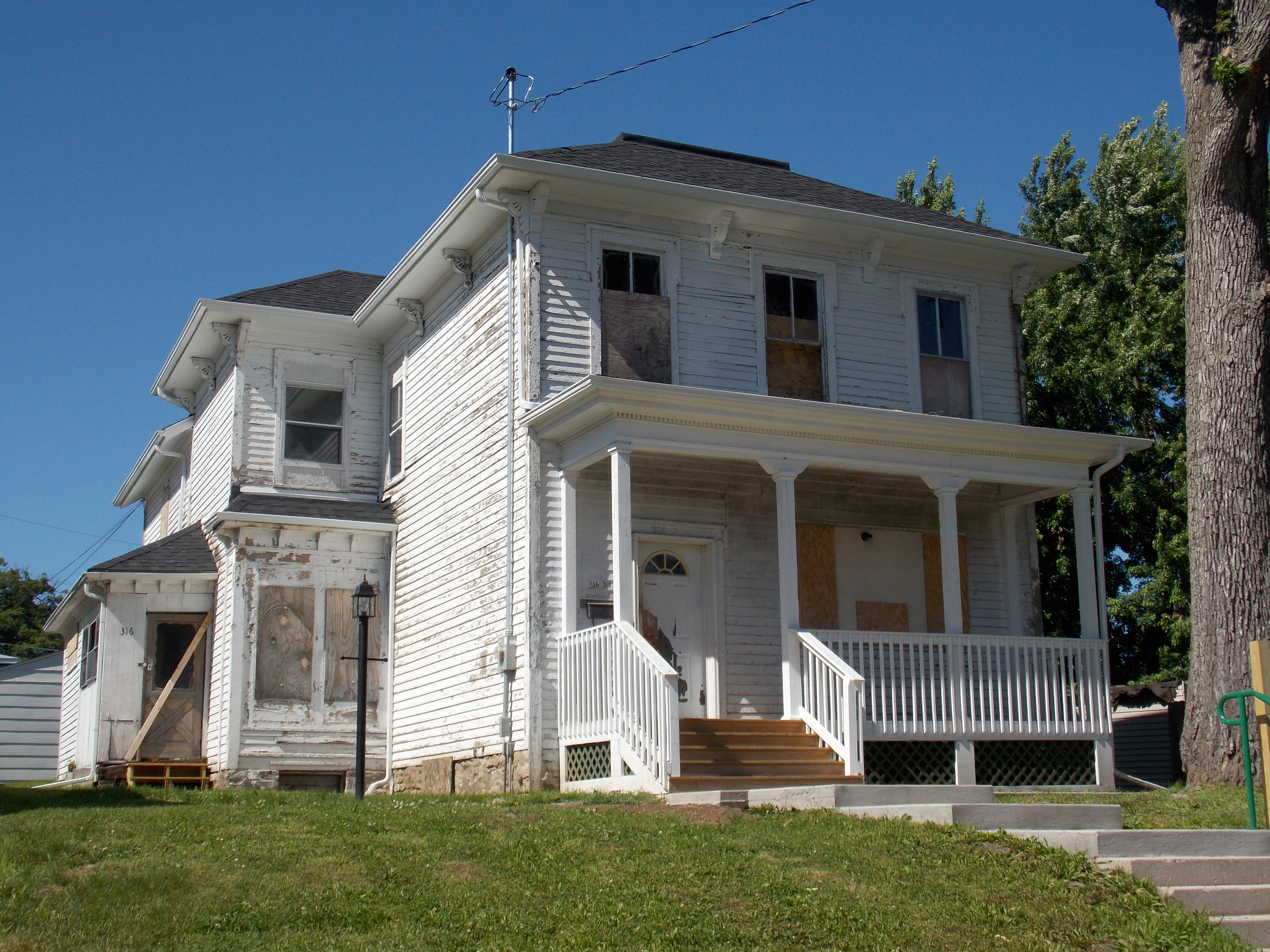
- The Isaac W. Harrison House in the process of being renovated.

- Location within Iowa Location within the United States
- Location: 318 E. 10th St. Davenport, Iowa
- Coordinates: 41°31′47″N 90°34′8″W
- Area: less than one acre
- Built: 1858
- Architectural style: Italianate
- MPS: Davenport MRA
- NRHP reference No.: 83004560
- Added to NRHP: July 23, 2015

The Isaac W. Harrison House is a historic building located in the Cork Hill neighborhood of Davenport, Iowa, United States. It is a somewhat simplified version of the Italianate style found in the city of Davenport. The house is a two-story, three–bay, frame structure with an entrance that is to the left of center. Like many early Italianate homes in Davenport it retained some features of the Greek Revival style. These are found in the glass framed doorway and the simple window pediments. It is also features bracketed eaves and is capped with a hipped roof.

Issac Harrison was a land and real estate agent who had this house built in 1858, three years after the area was subdivided. He lived here for over two decades. The front porch is not original. The house has been listed on the National Register of Historic Places since 2015.
