= W.S. Cameron House =

Historic house in Iowa, United States

- U.S. National Register of Historic Places
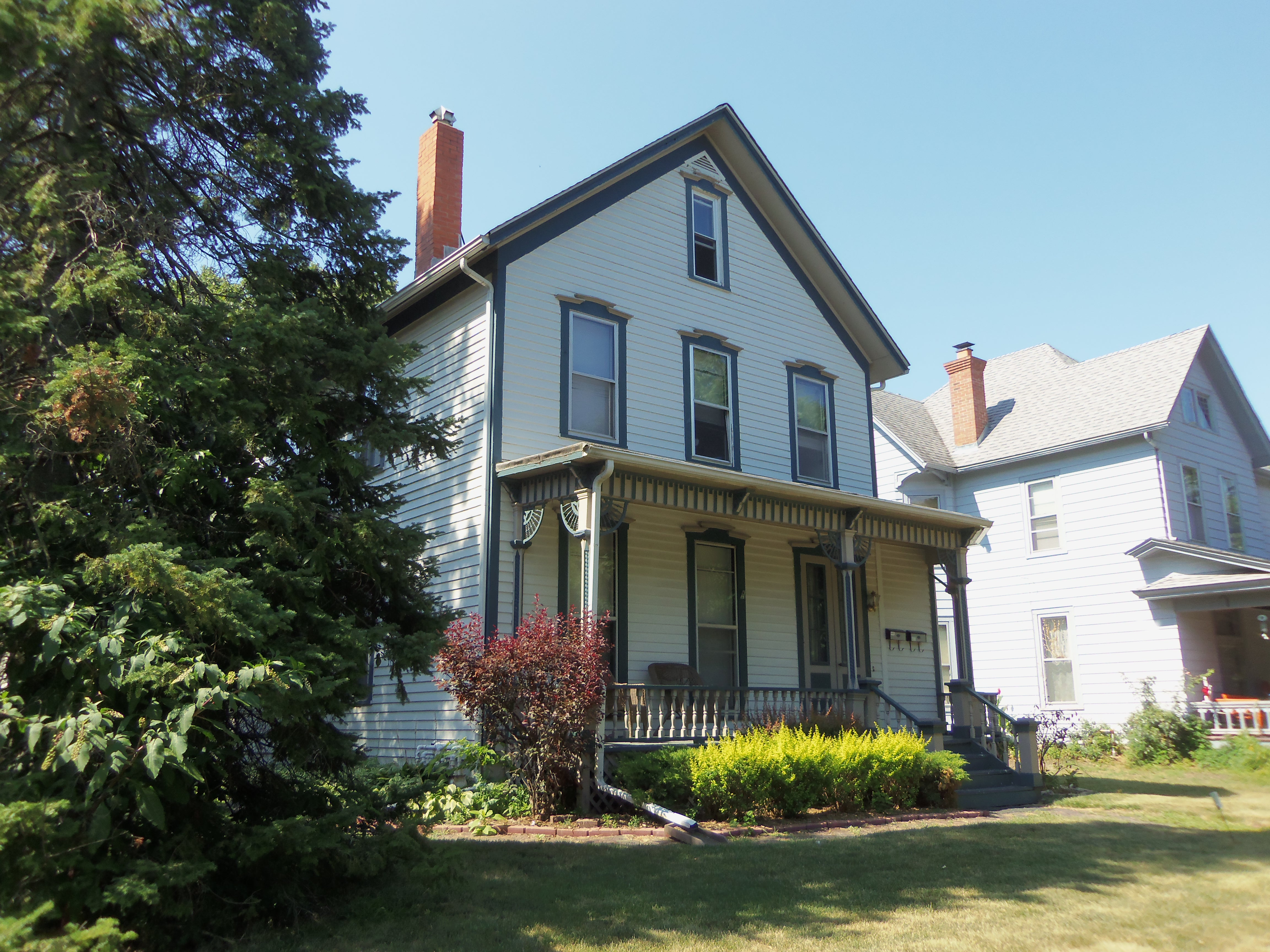

- Location within Iowa Location within the United States
- Location: 623 Kirkwood Boulevard; Davenport, Iowa
- Coordinates: 41°32′9″N 90°33′57″W
- Area: less than one acre
- Built: 1880
- Architectural style: Vernacular (McClelland)
- MPS: Davenport MRA
- NRHP reference No.: 84001325
- Added to NRHP: July 27, 1984

The W.S. Cameron House is a historic building located on the eastside of Davenport, Iowa, United States. W.S. Cameron, who owned a clothing store named W.S. Cameron & Sons, moved to this residence in 1884. The house is one of the most popular Vernacular house styles built in 19th-century Davenport known as the McClelland. The two-story frame house features a three bay front-gabled form, which is typical of the style. This particular example shows one of the adaptations of the style using applied decorations. The windows surrounds feature shallow, broken cornices and the front porch features brackets and an unusual spiral motif on the columns. The residence has been listed on the National Register of Historic Places since 1984.
