= Lucian Newhall House (Davenport, Iowa) =

Historic house in Iowa, United States

- U.S. National Register of Historic Places
- Location within Iowa Location within the United States
- Location: 526 Iowa St. Davenport, Iowa
- Coordinates: 41°31′38″N 90°34′12″W
- Area: less than one acre
- Built: 1875
- Architectural style: Italianate
- MPS: Davenport MRA
- NRHP reference No.: 83002476
- Added to NRHP: July 7, 1983

The Lucian Newhall House was a historic building located on the east side of Davenport, Iowa, United States near the downtown area. The Italianate residence was built in 1875 by Lucian Newhall. Charles Whitaker, a contractor, bought the property in 1887 for $1,000. After Whitaker sold the house it was solely a rental four-plex, and it has subsequently been torn down. The wood-frame structure sat on a stone foundation. It featured a bracketed porch, window bays on the sides and window surrounds. The entrances to the four units sat side by side in the center of the main façade. It was listed on the National Register of Historic Places in 1983.
