= St. Paul Lutheran Church (Davenport, Iowa) =

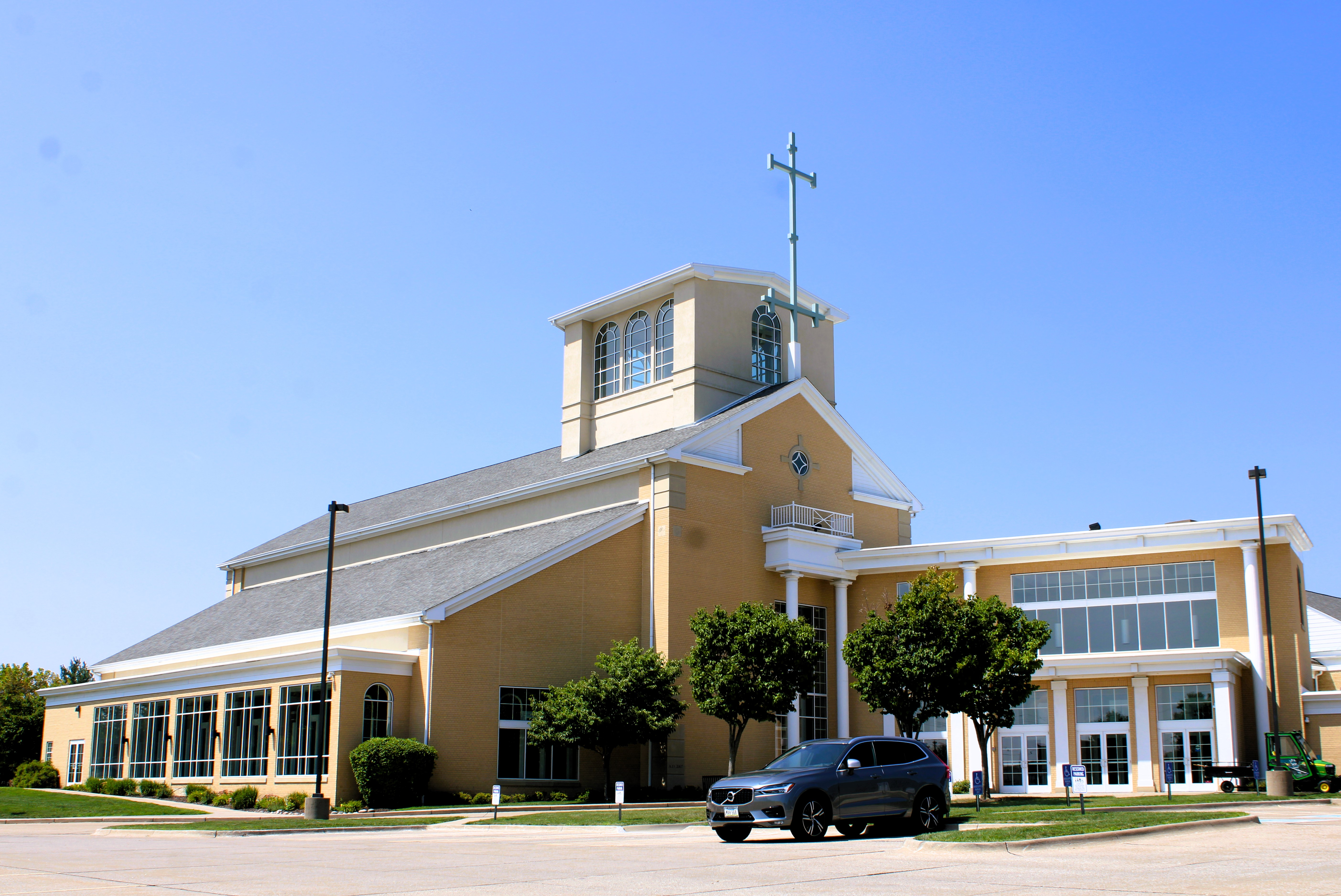
- St. Paul Lutheran Church in 2023

- Location within Iowa
- 41°32′30″N 90°34′28″W
- Location: 2136 Brady St. Davenport, Iowa
- Country: United States
- Denomination: Evangelical Lutheran Church in America
- Website: stpaulqc.org

Architecture
- Architect: Groth Design Group
- Style: Georgian Colonial Revival
- Completed: 2007
- Construction cost: $7.2 million

Specifications
- Capacity: 750
- Materials: Brick

Clergy
- Pastor(s): Sara Olson-Smith; Katy Warren; Maddy Tyler
- E.C. Mueller House
- U.S. Historic district – Contributing property
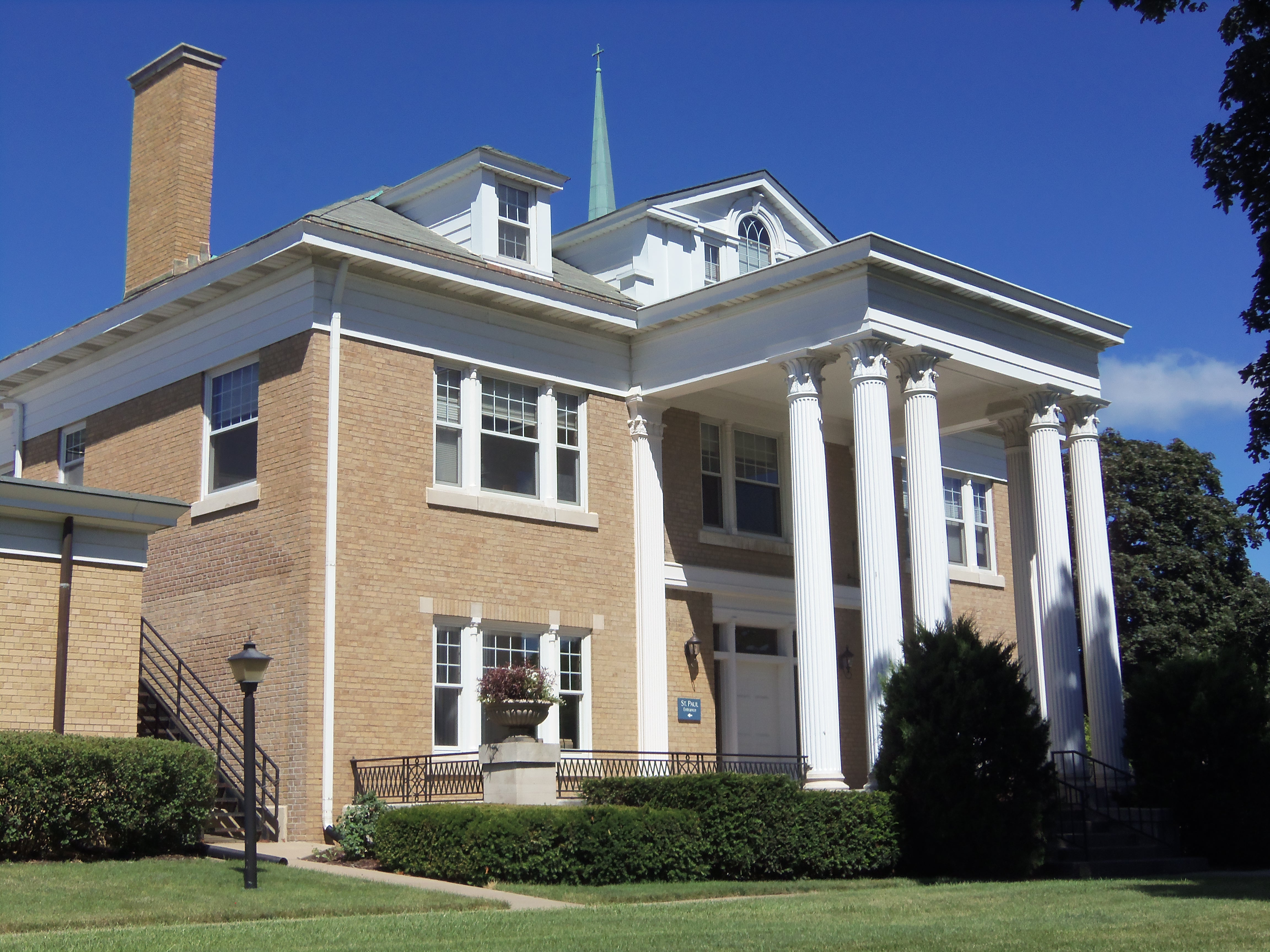
- E.C. Mueller House
- Part of: Vander Veer Park Historic District (ID85000784)
- Added to NRHP: April 9, 1985
- St. Paul's English Lutheran Church
- U.S. National Register of Historic Places
- U.S. Historic district – Contributing property
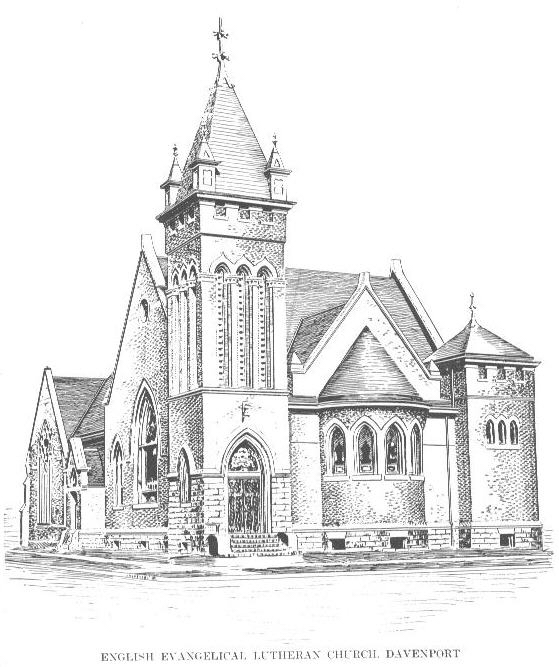
- The 1902 church with the front of the 1882 church, which can be seen at the far left.
- Location: 1402 Main St. Davenport, Iowa
- Area: less than one acre
- Built: 1902
- Architectural style: Gothic Revival
- MPS: Davenport MRA
- NRHP reference No.: 83002512
- Added to NRHP: July 7, 1983

St. Paul Lutheran Church is located in central, Davenport, Iowa, United States. It is affiliated with the Evangelical Lutheran Church in America (ELCA). The church's original property, which subsequently housed other Protestant congregations, was listed on the National Register of Historic Places in 1983, but has since been torn down. The present complex was built in 1952 and contains two buildings that are contributing properties in the Vander Veer Park Historic District. The present church building was completed in 2007.

== History ==
=== Development of the Lutheran Church in Davenport ===
The Lutheran Church was the last mainline Protestant congregation to organize in Davenport. Early attempts were made among the German immigrants, but they were met with only minimal success. In 1861, a German Lutheran minister was sent to Davenport. A year later he started organizing First German Evangelical Lutheran Zion Church and a building was erected in 1866. Theological disagreements erupted within the congregation and the pastor and a group of parishioners left to form Trinity German Evangelical Lutheran Church in 1869. They affiliated with the Lutheran Church–Missouri Synod. Zion languished until a new wave of German immigration came into the city in the 1870s. They continued German language services until World War I. Both Zion and Trinity remain in existence.

There is some evidence that early in the 1850s there were efforts to establish an English Lutheran Church as well. Property had been acquired in Green's second addition to the city of Davenport by the trustees of the First English Lutheran Church. There was a stipulation that a two-story building, no less than 70 by 40 feet (21 by 12 m) be constructed on the property. The condition was not met and the property was forfeited. The Davenport banking firm of Cook & Sargent was involved in the transaction.

=== Formation of the congregation ===
The Rev. George W. Snyder was commissioned to Davenport by the board of home missions on April 1, 1879. He had spent the previous year canvassing the city with the Rev. G.W. Diveley and was able to get the signatures of thirty people who wanted to belong to the new congregation. The congregation was affiliated with the Evangelical Lutheran Synod of Iowa on October 30, 1879, but no services or other functions were held by the congregation until a church building was constructed.

Snyder was able to raise $4,000 and secure property on the corner of Main and 14th Streets for $1,740. The first church building was built during the autumn of 1881 and the first service for the new congregation was held on January 22, 1882. The Sunday School, which was also organized that day, counted 34 students. The charter members of the new congregation included: H. B. Martin, Mrs. A. S. Martin, Jane Rhodes, Bernhard Reilley, Catherine Reilley, Anna A. Reilley, Philip Garner, Susan Garner, Lucinda Garner (who later became Mrs. John Roth) and Laura B. Snyder.

The small church was dedicated on April 30, 1882. Rev. G. W. Stelling, of Omaha, Nebraska, preached the sermon. Also assisting at the service were Rev. J. W. Goodlin, the secretary of the board of home missions, and Rev. S. D. Barnitz, the western secretary of the board. On April 1, 1891, Snyder ended his pastorate at St. Paul's to assume a charge at Council Bluffs, Iowa. The Rev. W. Henry Blancke accepted the call on June 24, 1891. The church building had become too small for the congregation, so a building committee and a finance committee were appointed and plans were developed for a new church. On May 4, 1902, the new sanctuary was dedicated. The new building, organ, and furnishings cost $26,000. Rev. E. F. Bartholomew, from Augustana College in Rock Island, Illinois, preached the dedication sermon in the morning and Rev. J. A. Wirt, of Des Moines, preached the evening sermon.

Blancke also served as president of the Civic Federation of Davenport during his pastorate. They employed legal extremes to fight vice and liquor. His continued leadership led to threats against himself, the congregation, and the church building. Membership suffered and fell to 100 in 1916 and the Sunday School had its lowest enrollment. After Blanke's pastorate ended the congregation grew spiritually, financially, and numerically.

=== Historic church building ===
Architecturally, the original 1881 church was a Gothic Revival structure. It featured a simple rectangular form with a steep pitched front-gabled roof, buttresses, and a large pointed-arch window on the main façade. The 1902 structure, which was attached to the older structure, was also designed in the Gothic Revival style. It featured a cross-gabled plan with towers tucked into the corners. The asymmetrical massing and the compactness of the structure emphasized the strong verticality of the structure. The rather plain brick exterior was punctuated with gothic-arched windows that were enhanced with narrow hood molds. An addition to the building was constructed in 1919.

== Later history ==
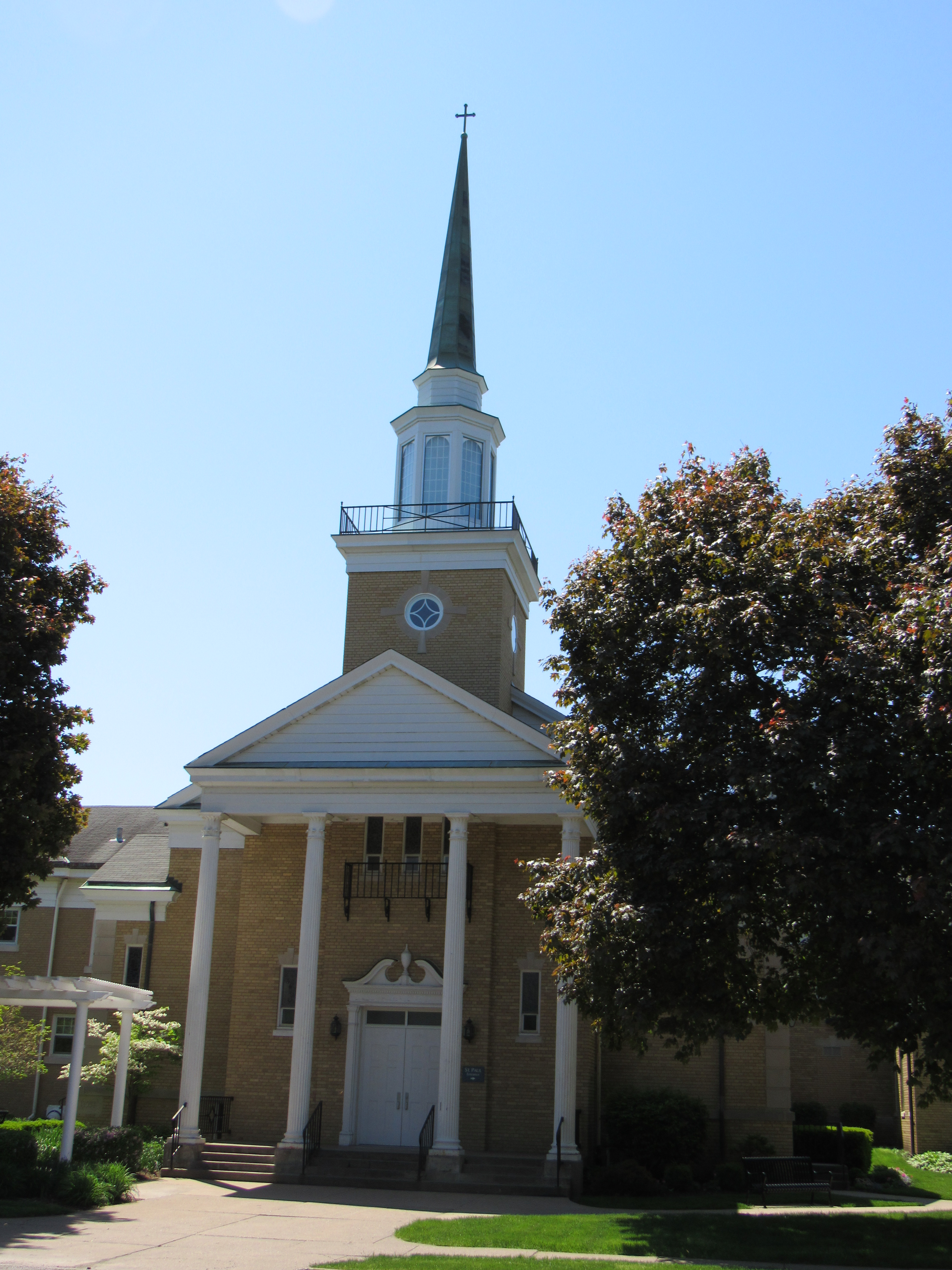
1952 church

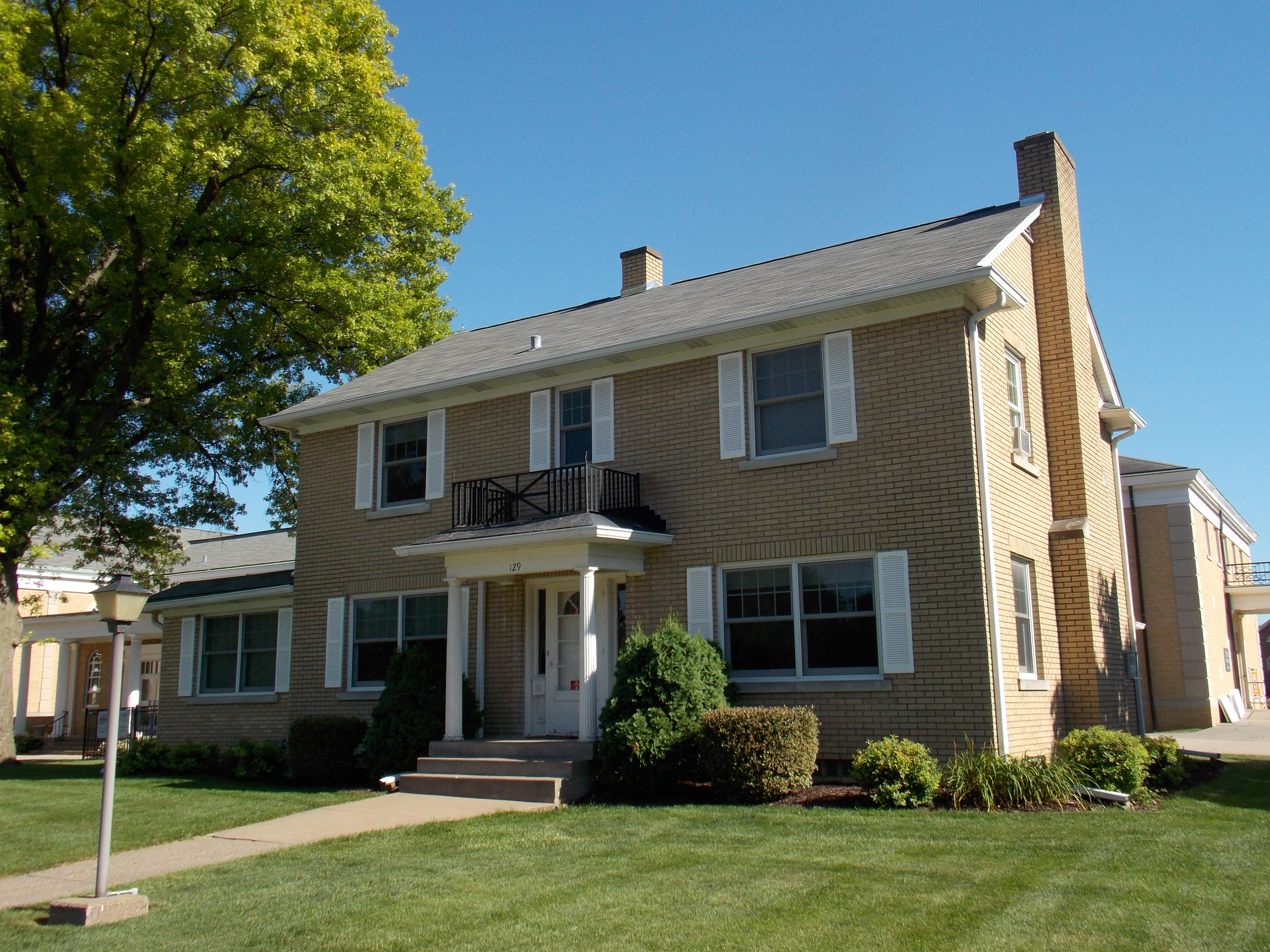
The house on Lombard Street.

By the middle of the 20th-century, the congregation outgrew its facilities yet again. This time the congregation chose to relocate further north and acquired property across Lombard Street from Vander Veer Park, and across Brady Street from the Outing Club. On the property was the E.C. Mueller House at 2136 Brady Street. The Georgian Revival home was designed by the Davenport architectural firm of Temple and Burrows. It was incorporated into the new church complex and housed administrative offices. It and another small house along Lombard Street are contributing properties in the Vander Veer Park Historic District. In 1952 a new sanctuary was built in the Georgian Revival style on the corner of Lombard and Brady Street. It contains 5,500 square feet (510 m^{2}) of space.

The old sanctuary was sold to El Bethel Assembly of God Church in 1952. The property was eventually sold to Third Missionary Baptist Church. They built a new sanctuary and tore the old church down. The location of the old church is now a parking lot for their present church.

=== Current church building ===
In 2007 the current St. Paul's sanctuary was built by the congregation. The $7.2 million expansion project was accomplished during the pastorate of Rev. Peter Marty and reflects the existing Georgian Revival style of the church's complex. The architect for the project was Groth Design Group of Cedarburg, Wisconsin and Estes Construction of Davenport was the main contractor.

The new worship space is 12,000 square feet (1,100 m^{2}) and seats 750 people. It features a tower of light, 10 stained glass windows from the 1952 sanctuary, and a 14-by-8-foot (4.3 by 2.4 m) widescreen. Wood craftsman Jay Stratton, glass sculptor Mark Fowler, and custom metal worker Mike Boyler created the altar, pulpit, and sanctuary cross. August Peter created a bronze baptismal font bowl and M.L. Bigelow and Company from American Fork, Utah built the pipe organ. The old sanctuary was turned into a gathering space and a chapel.

St. Paul's congregation, which now numbers around 3,000 people, has always been aware of its missionary responsibility. Over the years three other Lutheran churches have been founded from St. Paul's: St. Mark in Davenport, St. James in Bettendorf, and Faith Lutheran in Eldridge. In 1976, the congregation developed Camp Shalom near Maquoketa, Iowa. In more recent years it has housed a Pastoral Residency Program to assist newly called pastors in the ELCA.
