= Vander Veer Park =

Vander Veer Park may refer to:

- Vander Veer Park Historic District
- Vander Veer Botanical Park
