= Vander Veer Park Historic District =

Historic house in Iowa, United States

- U.S. National Register of Historic Places
- U.S. Historic district
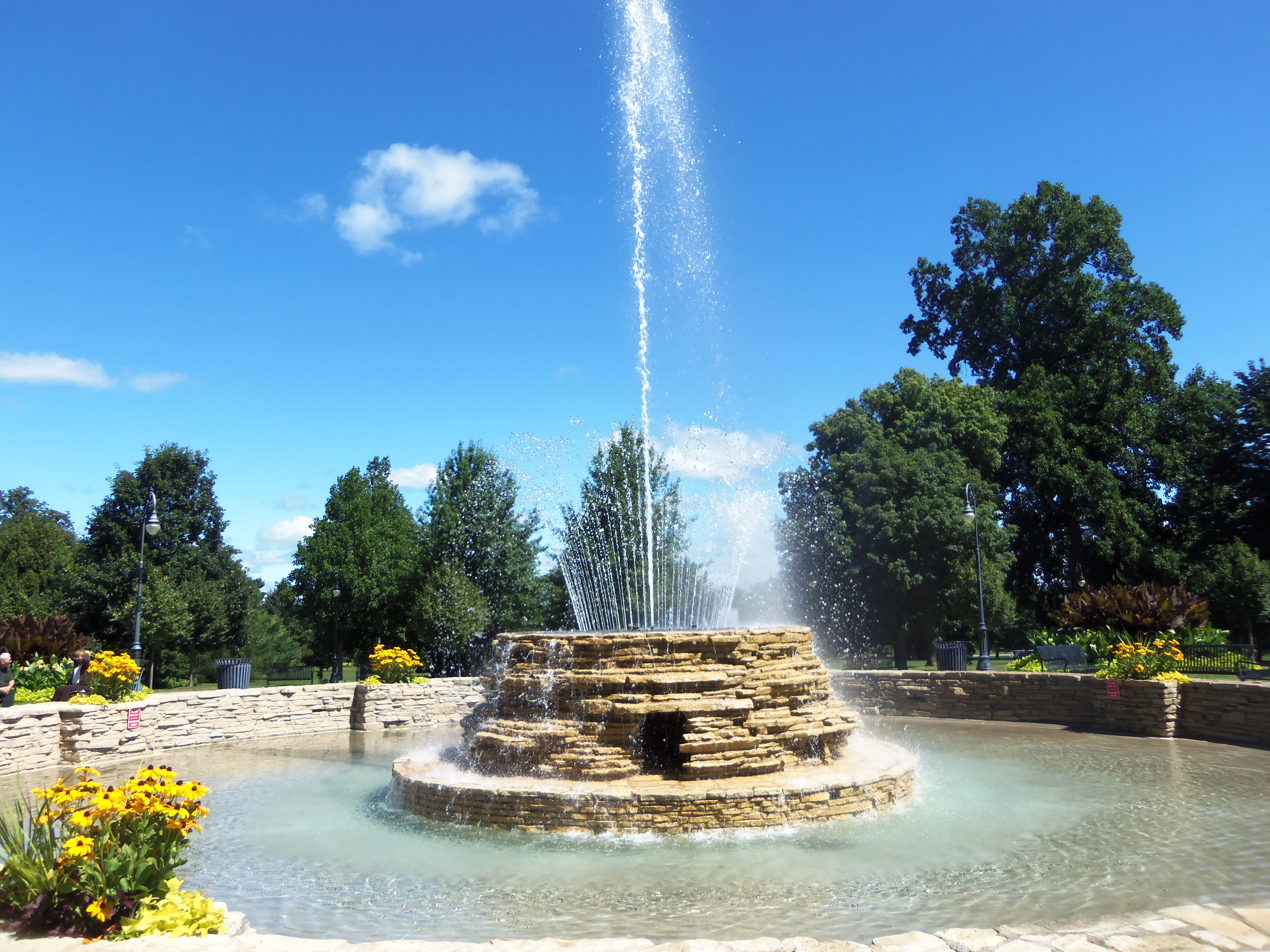
- Vander Veer Park fountain is a Civil Works Administration project.

- Location within Iowa Location within the United States
- Location: Roughly bounded by Temple Lane, W. Central Park Ave., Brady, High, and Harrison Sts., Davenport, Iowa
- Coordinates: 41°32′35″N 90°34′28″W
- Area: 70.8 acres (28.7 ha)
- Architect: Multiple
- Architectural style: Late 19th And Early 20th Century American Movements, Late 19th And 20th Century Revivals, Late Victorian
- MPS: Davenport MRA
- NRHP reference No.: 85000784
- Added to NRHP: April 9, 1985

The Vander Veer Park Historic District is a historic district in Davenport, Iowa, United States, that was listed on the National Register of Historic Places. Over its 70.8-acre (287,000 m^{2}) area, in 1985 it included 66 contributing buildings, two contributing structures, one contributing site, and one contributing object.

== Description ==
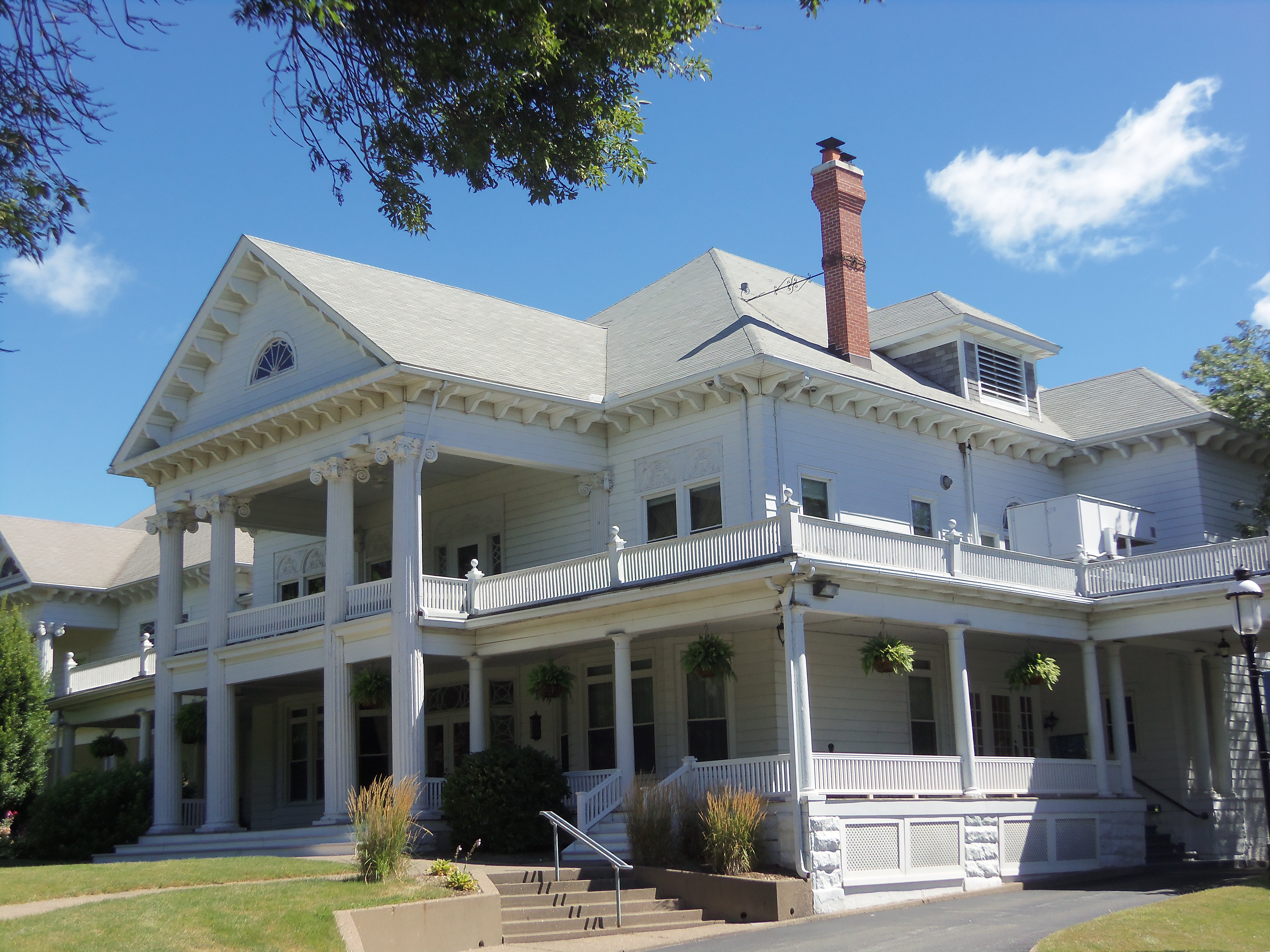
The Outing Club

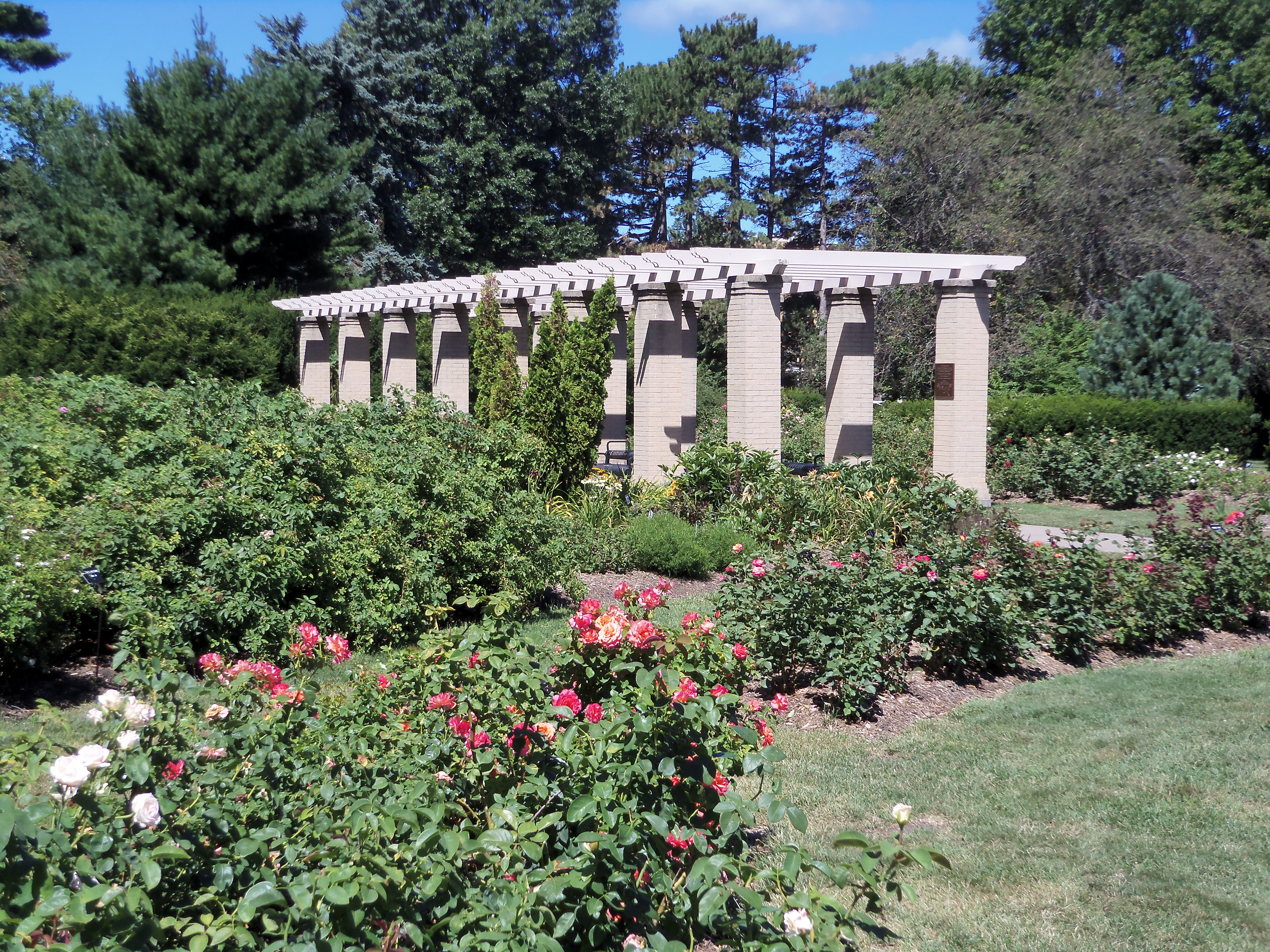
Rose Garden

The historic district consists of houses surrounding Vander Veer Park. The neighborhood is located 22 blocks north of the Mississippi River at the head of the Harrison-Main-Brady thoroughfares, which originate in the city's central business district and rise above the bluffs. The park is bounded on the north by Central Park Avenue, to the east by Brady Street, south by Lombard Street, and to the west by Harrison Street. Middle- and upper-middle-class houses were built between 1895 and 1915 and are Queen Anne and Tudor Revival style. The neighborhood is anchored on the south by St. Paul Lutheran Church and the Outing Club. The focal point of the historic district is Vander Veer Park, which is a trapezoid of 33 acres (13 ha). The beautiful atmosphere of the neighborhood is marred only by the density of traffic on Brady and Harrison Streets (formerly US 61).

== History ==
=== Vander Veer Park ===
In 1885 the city of Davenport acquired the property that had been the Scott County Fairgrounds. It is a significant example of landscape planning, and of the civic improvements that were being made by the city in the late 19th and early 20th centuries. Five years after the land was purchased and improved it was named Central Park after New York City's park of the same name. Like its namesake it featured naturalistic landscaping, a glasshouse, floral gardens, a large pond, picnic pavilion, and a picturesque bridge. Central Park was the first major park established by the City of Davenport. The year that it opened the city established the Board of Parks Commissioners. They acquired other properties and established residential parks similar to Central Park. The parks included both Lookout Park, later renamed Riverview Terrace, and Prospect Park that were brought into the city's system in 1894. Fejervary Park was acquired in 1902. Other major projects in the city's beautification program included riverfront improvement that created LeClaire Park and included the W.D. Petersen Memorial Music Pavilion, Dillon Fountain, and Union Station between 1911 and 1931.

Central Park was renamed Vander Veer after an early Davenport park commissioner in 1911. In the 1930s Civil Works Administration crews altered the park's plan by removing the corner entrances at Brady and Lombard Streets and at Harrison and Lombard Streets. The original street lights and the iron fountain were replaced with modern light standards and a stone-and-concrete fountain that was operated electrically.

=== Neighborhood ===
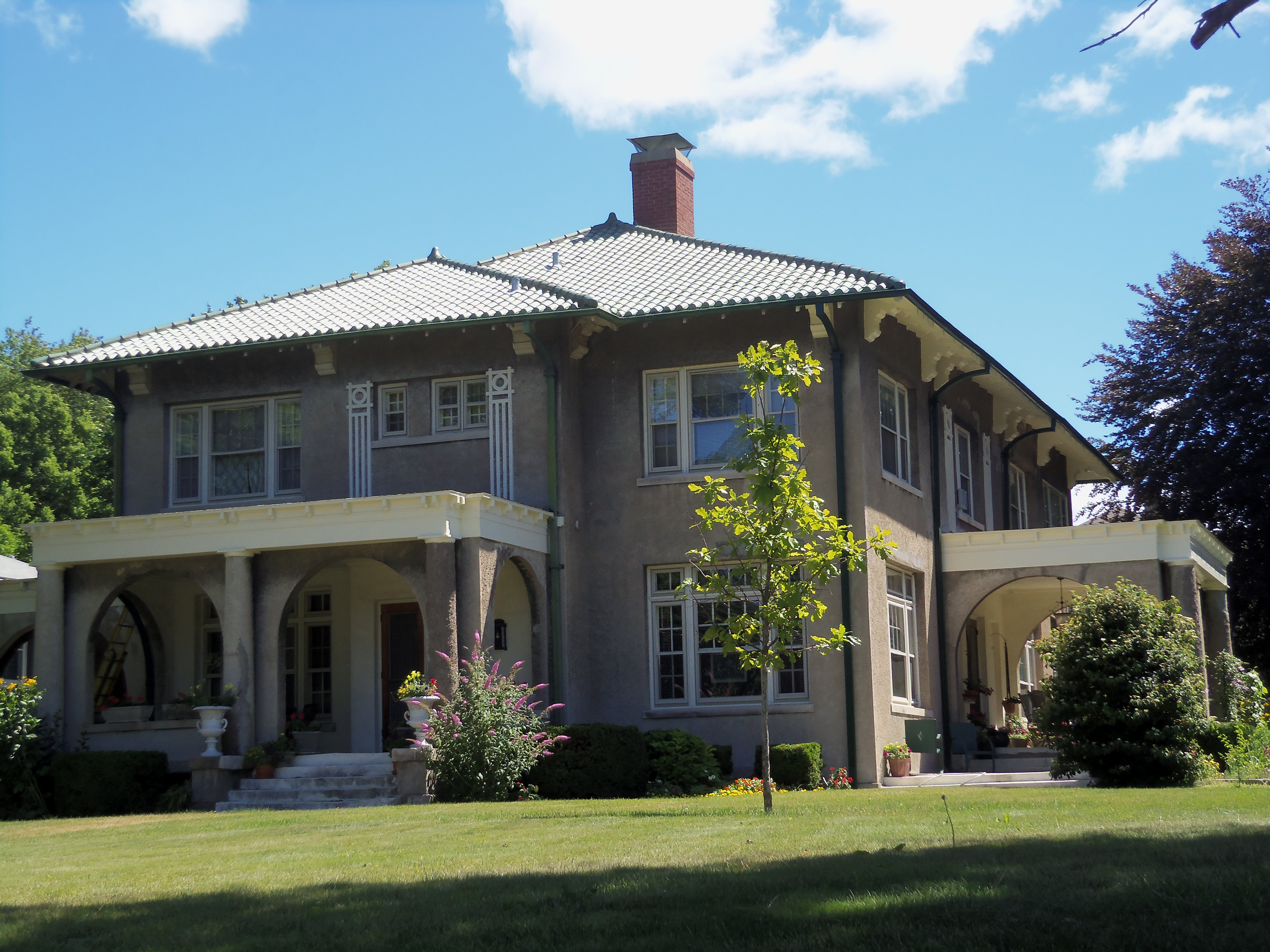
Louis Marks House

The establishment of Central Park increased the desirability and cost of the surrounding land for residential development. On the east side of Brady Street are the Central Park and Central Park Second additions that were platted in 1891 and 1896, respectively. The Outing Club and Temple Lane additions on the south side of the park, and two Norwood Park additions on the west side of Harrison were platted after 1900.

Davenport's streetcar system was electrified and expanded into residential areas beyond the original city core near the river in 1888. The Brady Street line, which traveled from Second Street to Central Park, aided the area's development as well as the neighborhoods further to the east. Established as a horsecar line in 1870, it was one of Davenport's first streetcar routes and connected the central business district with the county fairgrounds. By the end of the 19th-century, it became a commuter route for businessmen and middle-class office workers.

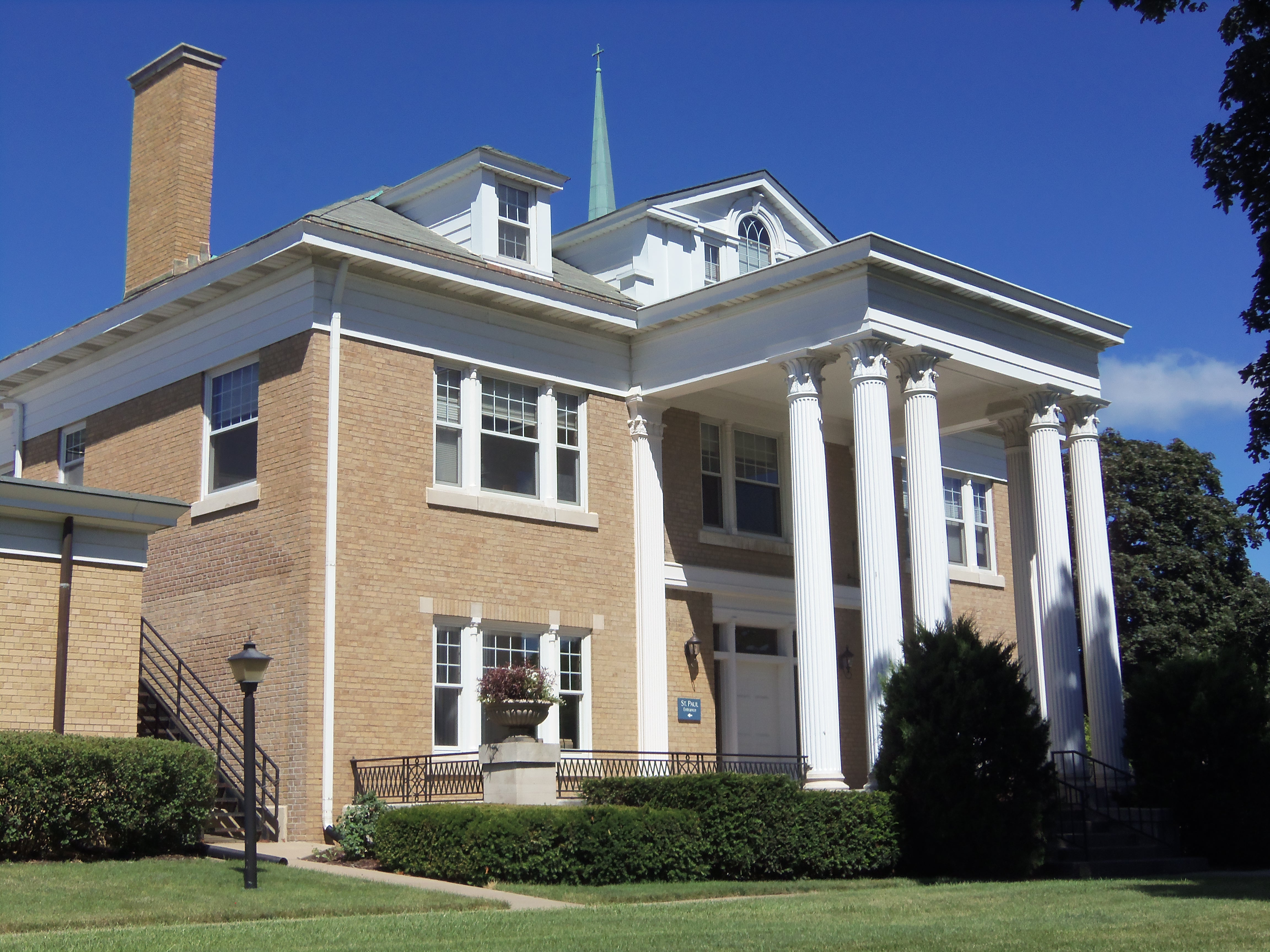
E.C. Mueller House

Because the neighborhood was relatively affluent several of the houses were designed by prominent local architects, and three of them lived near the park. Rudolph Clausen, of Clausen & Burrows, lived in a Tudor-style house at 2330 Harrison Street. The firm also designed the H.G. Pape House at 2326 Harrison. Edward S. Hammatt, who designed multiple buildings for the Episcopal Diocese of Iowa, designed his house at 2313 Brady Street. Gustav Hanssen's house was located at 124 Rusholme Street. He also designed two Neoclassical-style houses at 2317 and 2319 Brady Street. Hanssen was in a partnership with Dietrich Harfst who designed the Henry Deutsch House at 2101 Main Street (no longer extant) and the C.E. Hanssen House at 2322 Harrison Street in the American Craftsman style. A third house attributed to Hanssen and Harfst is the Henry Heubotter House at 2116 Main Street, which is a rambling version of the American foursquare. Although they didn't live in the neighborhood, Temple and Burrows designed the Georgian Revival E.C. Mueller House at 2136 Brady Street.
