= Bridge Avenue Historic District =

Historic district in Iowa, United States

- U.S. National Register of Historic Places
- U.S. Historic district
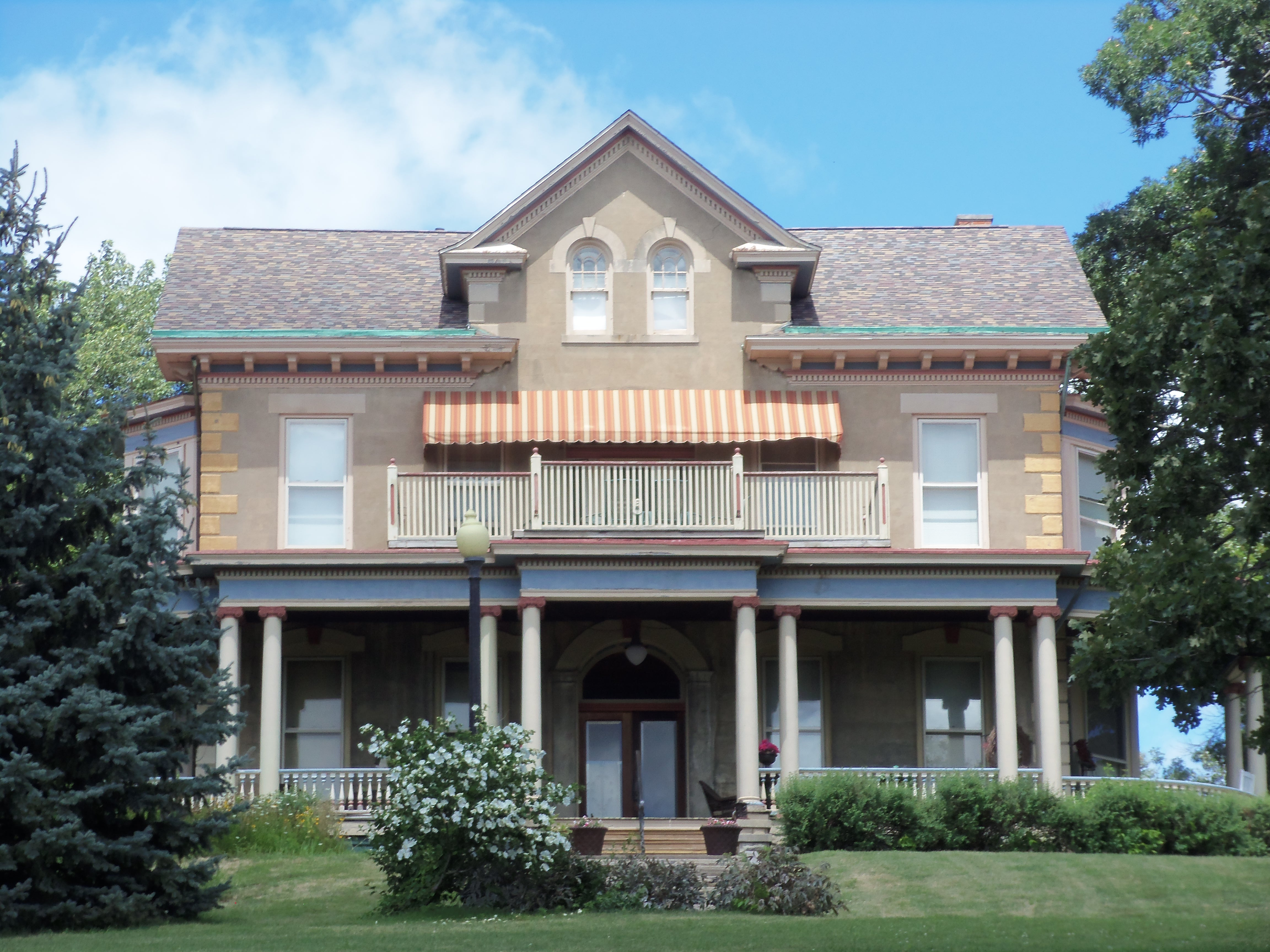
- Ambrose Fulton House (1871)

- Location within Iowa Location within the United States
- Location: Bridge Ave. from River Dr. to Ninth St., Davenport, Iowa
- Coordinates: 41°31′41″N 90°33′28″W
- Area: 6 acres (2.4 ha)
- Built: 1870-1910
- Architect: Multiple
- Architectural style: Italianate; Colonial Revival
- MPS: Davenport MRA
- NRHP reference No.: 83003626
- Added to NRHP: November 28, 1983

The Bridge Avenue Historic District is located in a residential neighborhood on the east side of Davenport, Iowa, United States. It has been listed on the National Register of Historic Places since 1983. The historic district stretches from River Drive along the Mississippi River up a bluff to East Ninth Street, which is near the top of the hill.

== Description ==
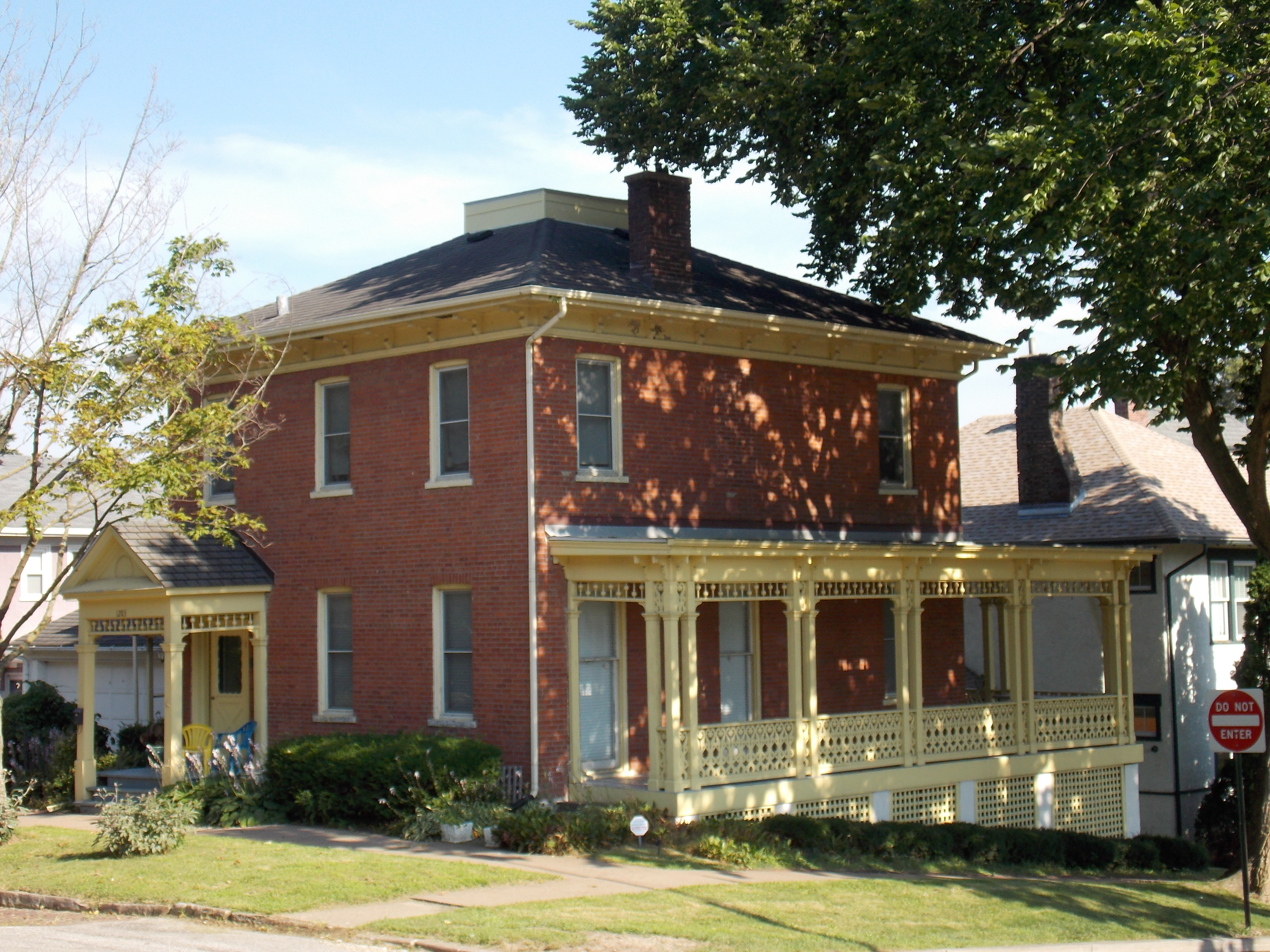
Nathan Rambo House

The historic district is made up of fourteen houses on the southern end of Bridge Avenue. The street itself rises steeply to the north from River Drive. It is located along the east side of a ravine that separates it from the St. Katherine's Historic District on the west. To the north and west is the LeClaire Reserve, a largely residential area built on property that had belonged to city founder Antoine LeClaire. A residential neighborhood to the east that dates from the early 20th Century includes the Prospect Park Historic District. The houses along this section of Bridge Avenue were largely built from the 1870s to 1910. The oldest house, however, was built in 1860. Ten of the houses are on the west side of the street and four are on the east side, which also includes the larger property of the Ambrose Fulton House. All but two of the houses are of frame construction. The two noncontributing elements in the district are a modern apartment building (730 Bridge) and a parking lot located at the foot of Bridge Avenue and Oneida Street.

== Architecture ==
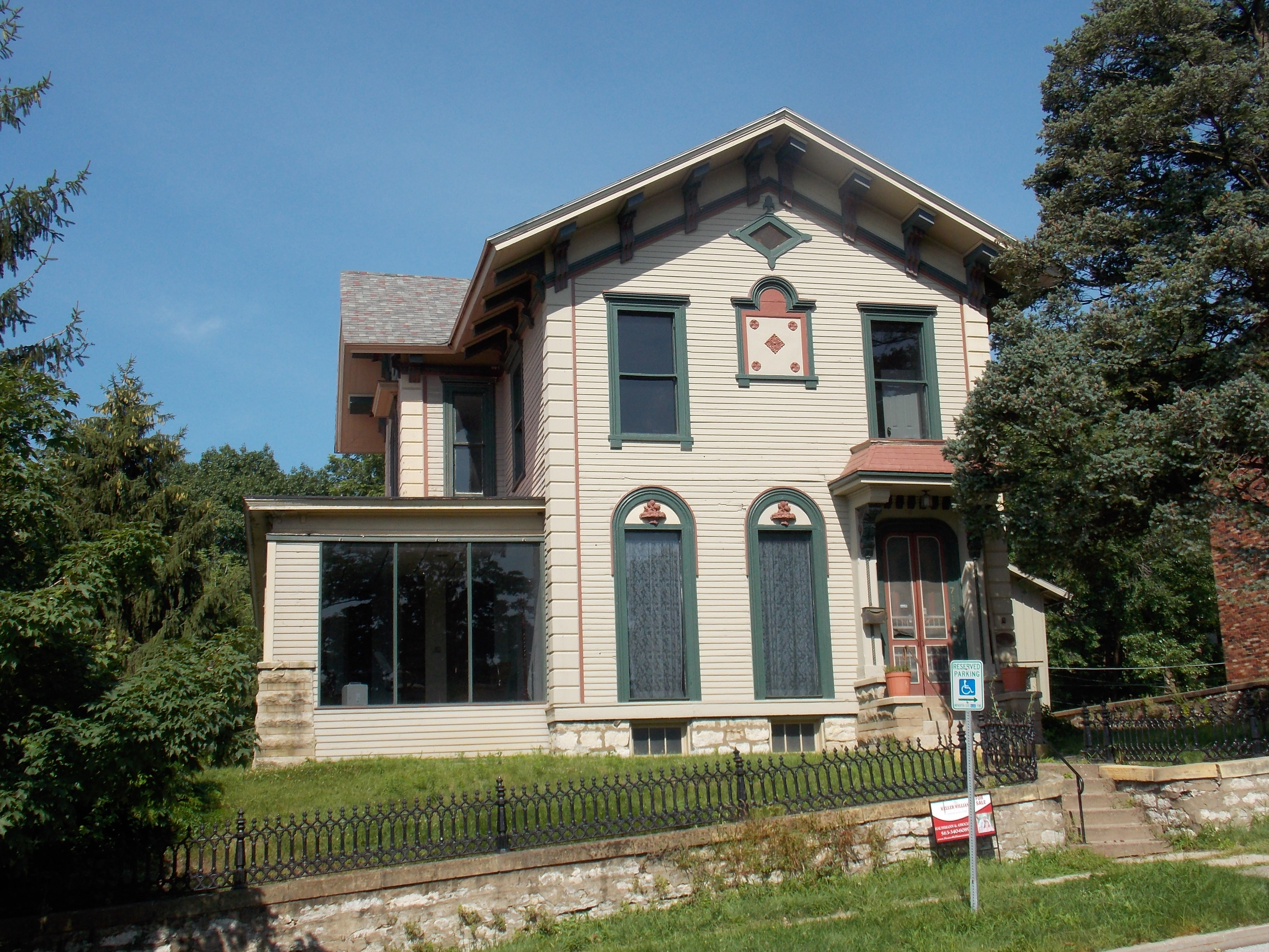
John Forrest House

The most prominent of the residences was built by Ambrose Fulton, who was significant to Davenport's early settlement and its industrial history. He was an early and aggressive promoter of the new town. Fulton was involved in multiple industries including flour mills, railroads, river commerce, land speculation, and retail commerce. Of the four oldest houses in the district, three are Italianate, including the Fulton House, and one is Second Empire. Three of the four houses feature quoined corners similar to that of the Fulton residence even though they are built of wood. Quoining is rare in Davenport's residential architecture and its noticeable incidence here suggest others were emulating Fulton. Besides Fulton, three other prominent members of the Davenport community built houses on Bridge Avenue. John B. Carmichael dealt in books, stationary, and wallpaper; Josiah Dow owned a grain mill; and John Forrest was a local politician and commercial developer. Forrest is also responsible for the Forrest Block downtown. Josiah's wife Maggie built a duplex on Bridge Avenue after her husband's death.

Nine of the more significant houses include:

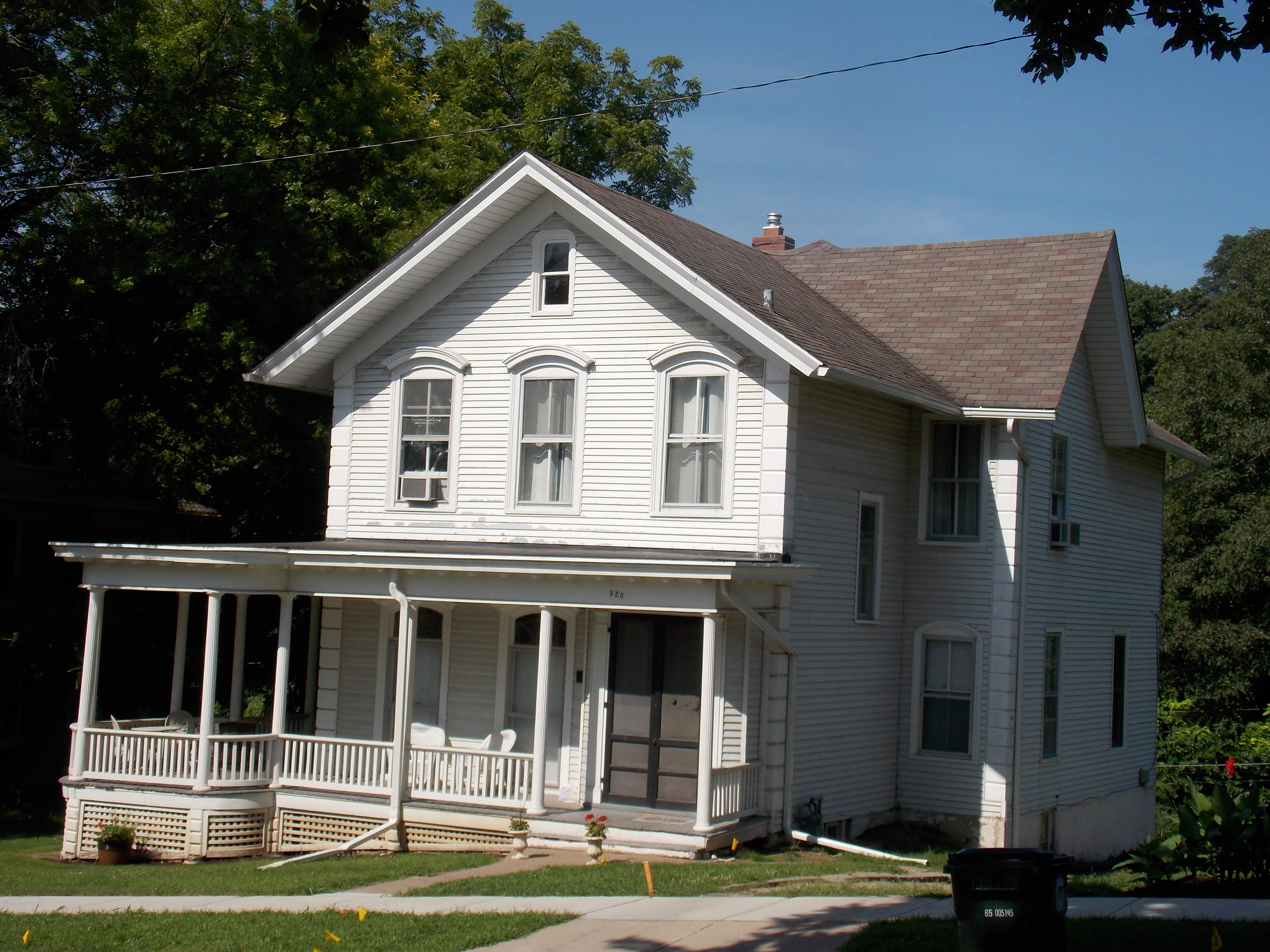
John B. Carmichael House

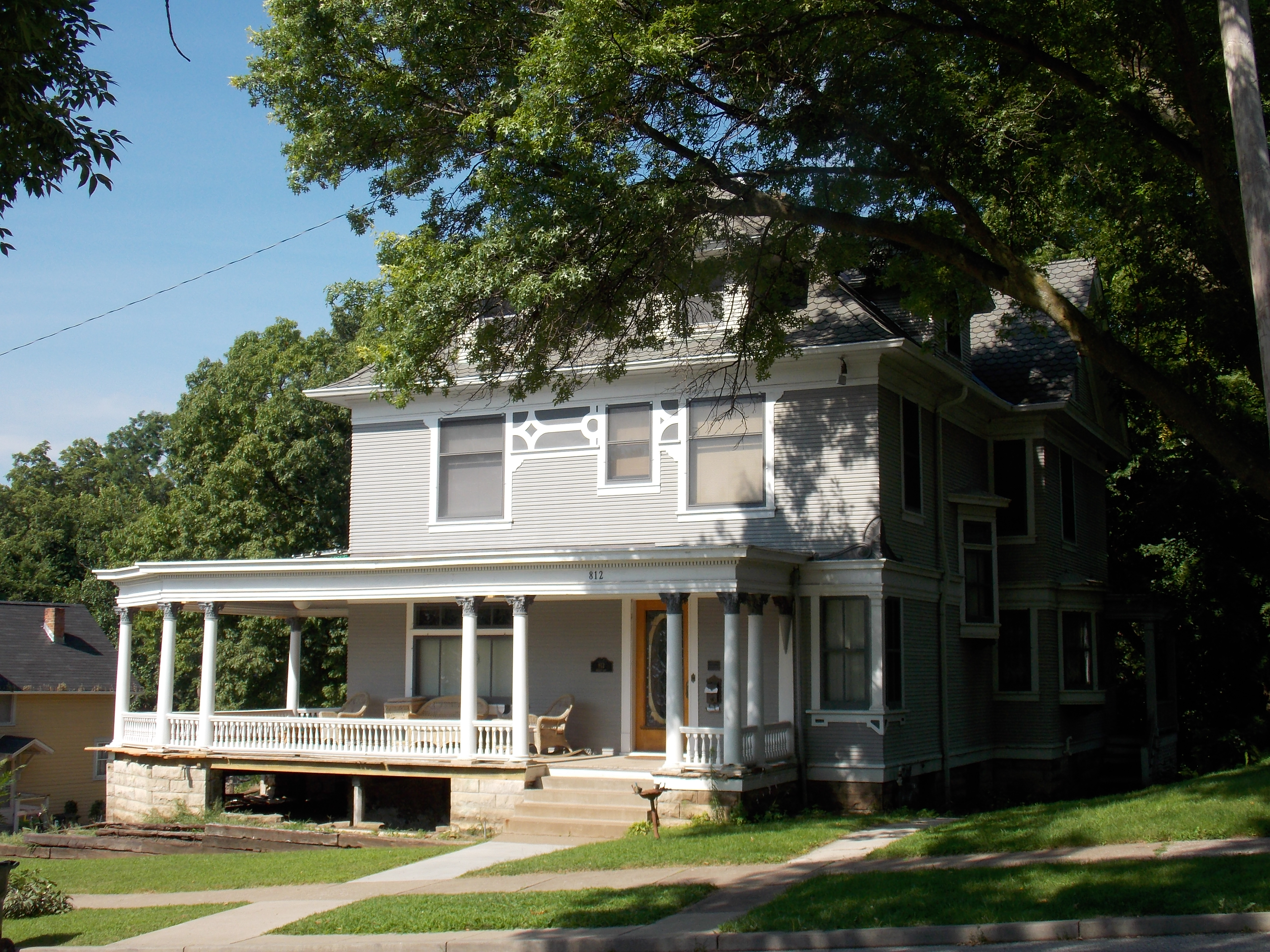
Cassius D. Hayward House

- Herman Andresen House (1885) 732 Bridge Avenue. The two-story frame residence features a bellcast mansard roof, and a molded cornice on the gable end.
- John B. Carmichael House (1885) 820 Bridge Avenue. The two-story, three-bay, front-gable frame house possesses Italianate characteristics that are found in the curved window heads and false wood quoining that is designed to look like masonry.
- Josiah Dow House (1874) 908 Bridge Avenue. The Second Empire frame house is a 2 1/2-story structure with a mansard roof, rectangular plan and an addition that was added to the back of the house.
- Maggie Dow House (1901) 815-815 1/2 Bridge Avenue. A two-story double house with a high hipped roof in the Georgian Revival style.
- John Forrest House (1875) 718 Bridge Avenue. A two-story, front-gable house with a cross gable and side porch in a combination Greek Revival and Italianate styles.
- A.C. Fulton House (1871) 1206 East River Drive. The house is a noteworthy example of vernacular domestic architecture that is based on the Italianate style. What makes the house unique in Davenport is that its side-gable form and symmetrical, five-bay main facade are derived from a vernacular Greek Revival style while the cornice, quoined corners, and window treatments follow the Italianate style. While the combination of these two styles in a single house is not unusual in the city, the form and mass are generally rendered in the Italianate while the decorative elements are Greek Revival. The columned porch adds to the house's eclecticism.
- Cassius D. Hayward House (1902) 812 Bridge Avenue. The Georgian Revival residence is a 2 1/2-story structure that follows an irregular plan and is capped by a hipped roof with dormers and projecting gables.
- W.J. Hayward House (1880) 802 Bridge Avenue. The two-story house follows an L-plan and features a three-bay symmetrical facade and a full-width porch. The Italianate house is capped with a hipped roof.
- Nathan Rambo House (1860) 1203 E. 9th Street. The two-story brick residence is a fine example of the "Cube-Form" Italianate house found in Davenport. It features an Eastlake-style entrance porch.
