= Outing Club =

- U.S. National Register of Historic Places
- U.S. Historic district – Contributing property
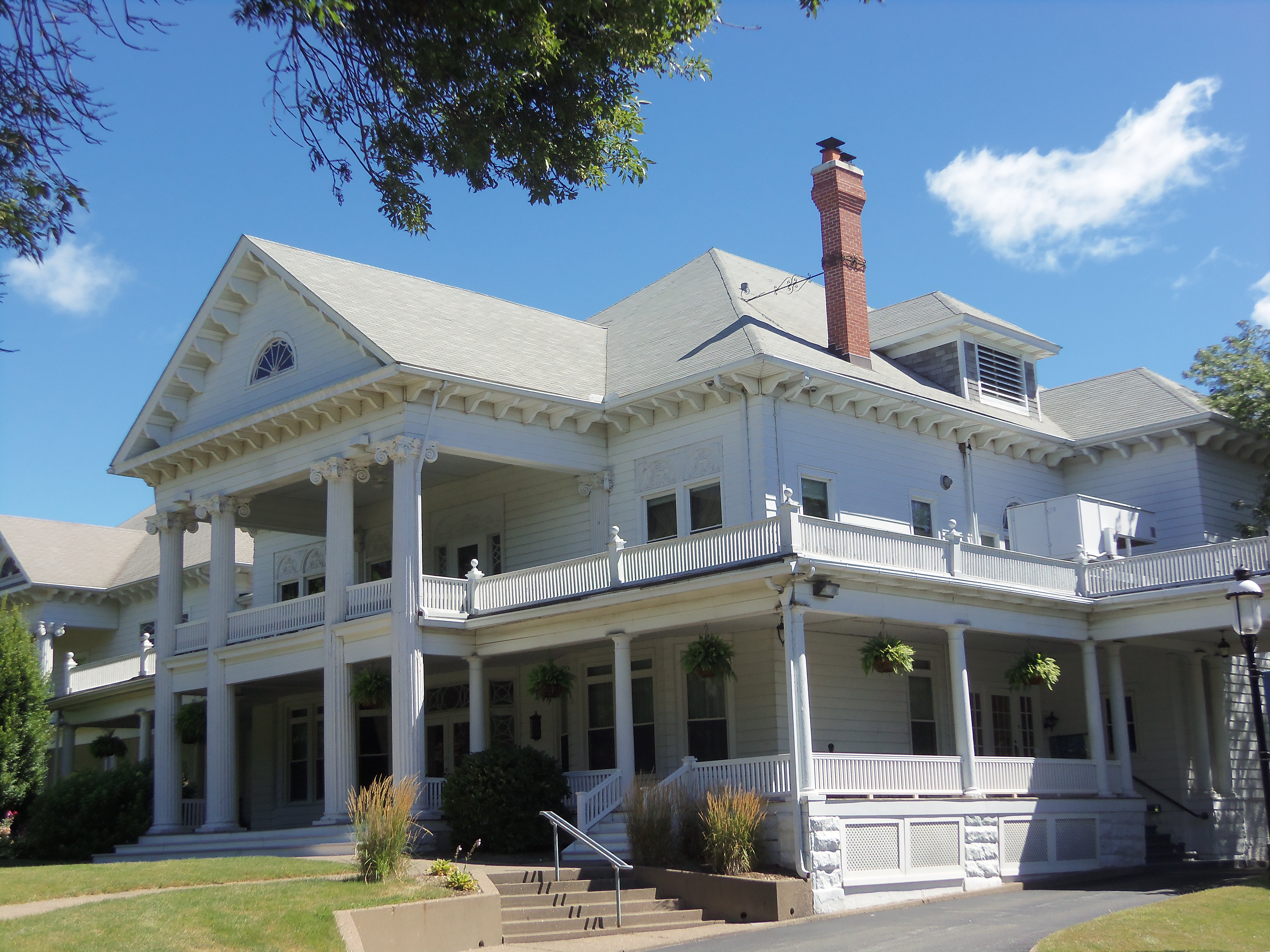
- Outing Club in 2013

- Location within Iowa Location within the United States
- Location: 2109 Brady Street; Davenport, Iowa
- Coordinates: 41°32′27″N 90°34′21″W
- Area: less than one acre
- Built: 1905
- Architect: Parke T. Burrows
- Architectural style: Colonial Revival
- Part of: Vander Veer Park Historic District (ID85000784)
- NRHP reference No.: 77000556
- Added to NRHP: July 15, 1977

The Outing Club is located in the central part of Davenport, Iowa, United States. It has been listed on the National Register of Historic Places since 1977. In 1985 it was included as a contributing property in the Vander Veer Park Historic District.

== History ==
In the early 1890s, the Rev. A.M. Judy of First Unitarian Church saw a need for a place for the young people of his congregation to gather for recreation and sporting activities. He enlisted the support of the Unity Club and they found that the estate of J.D. Brewster on Brady Street near Central Park, now Vander Veer Park, was available. The house would serve as a clubhouse and the grounds were large enough to support tennis and a variety of field sports. Citizens from the larger community expressed interest. Davenport's social elite took up Judy's idea and transformed what was a simple recreational facility and made it into an exclusive club by selling subscriptions. In June 1891, subscriptions to participate in the club began, and the required 300 were realized by July. The former Brewster residence was purchased and the club was organized.

As the club grew, outdoor concerts and dances were held. A bowling alley and shooting gallery were added. A larger clubhouse was required and a Colonial Revival structure was built in 1903. It included dining rooms, smoking and billiard rooms, a reading room and a ballroom. A fire destroyed the building in April 1905, but it was rebuilt and opened in July of the same year. Davenport architect Parke T. Burrows was responsible for the designs of the present building. The club has continued to grow over the years and it has expanded its facilities and activities.

== Architecture ==
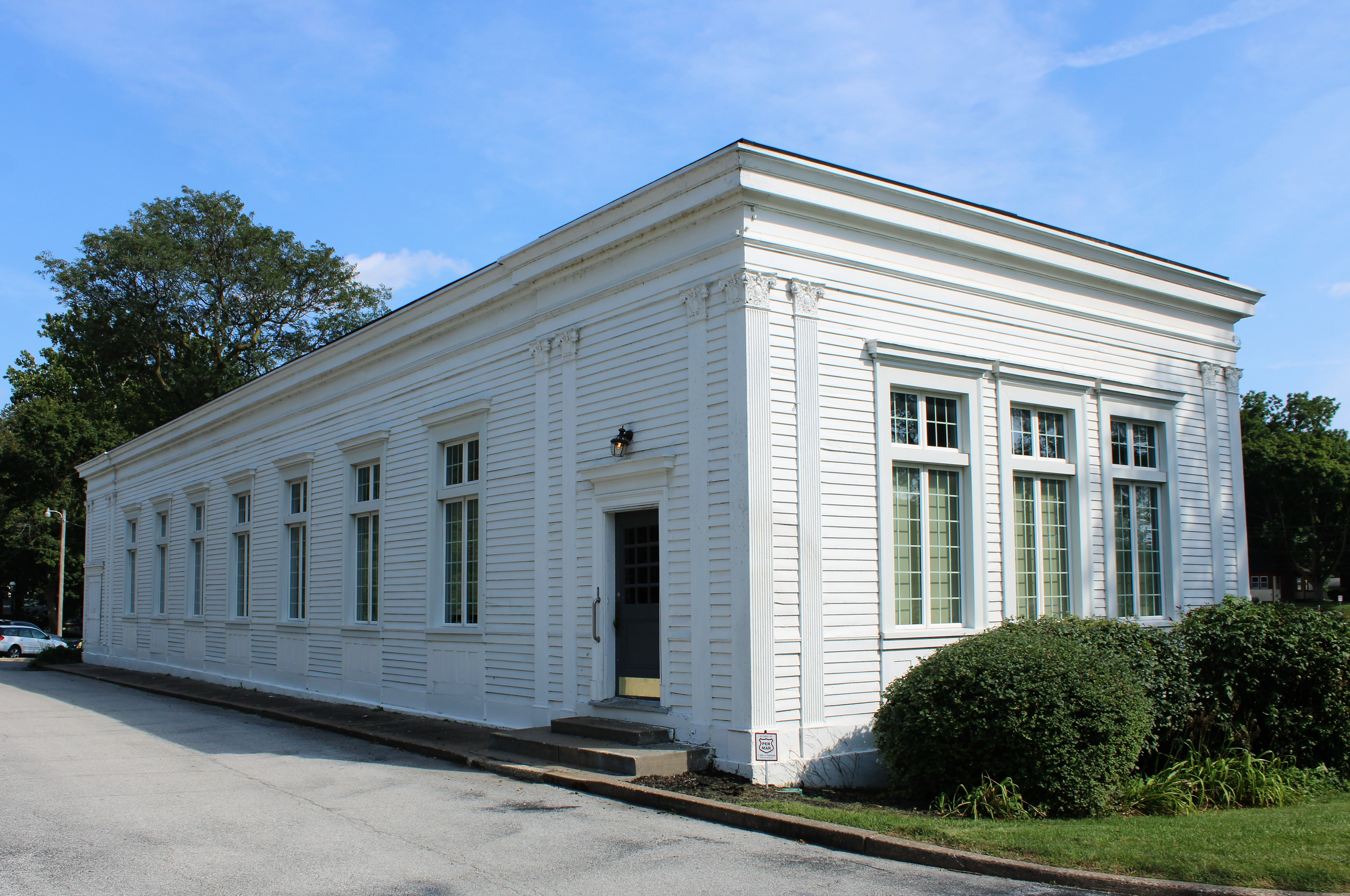
Bowling Alley in 2022

The historic designation includes two buildings, the main clubhouse and the bowling alley. Both are of frame construction. The 1905 clubhouse is a square, two-story structure that is capped with a hipped roof. The main facade features a large tetrastyle portico with columns in a Renaissance Ionic style. The opening between the two center columns is extremely wide to visually show off the wide front entrance. The cornices are bracketed, and the tympana has a semi-circular fanlight with radiating tracery. There are pilasters at the junction of the portico with the house that terminate at the second-floor level. A wide porch is located on the west and on a portion of the south elevations of the clubhouse. It forms a terrace on the second floor. The porch is supported by attenuated Tuscan columns. A porte-cochere is located on the south elevation. The north elevation had a portico similar to the west elevation, but it was replaced by a later addition.

The bowling alley is older than the main clubhouse, having been built sometime in the 1890s. It was originally a two-story structure, but it was struck by lightning in 1916 and remodeled into a single-story structure. The second story had housed billiard and card rooms. The building houses four bowling alleys. The pins were set by hand until 1976. The main facade is divided into nine bays. The entrances are located at the two ends of the rectangular structure and extend slightly beyond the main wall to form end pavilions. The doorways are framed by architraves that are capped with flat pediments. Paired Corinthian pilasters frame the ends of the pavilions. The windows in the center bays where the bowling allies are located are divided into four unequal sections by a Latin-cross sash.
