= Putnam Museum =

Putnam Museum and Science Center
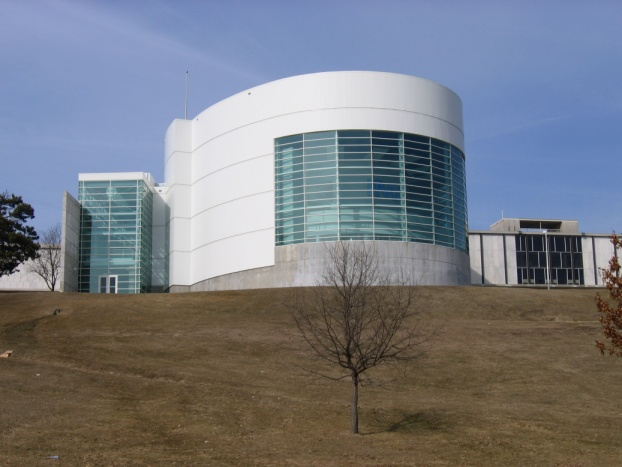
- Former name: 1867 - Davenport Academy of Natural Sciences 1900 - Davenport Academy of Sciences 1927 - Davenport Public Museum 1970 - Davenport Museum 1974 - Putnam Museum 1990 - Putnam Museum of History and Natural Science 2014 - Putnam Museum and Science Center
- Established: 1867
- Location: Davenport, Iowa, United States
- Type: History and Science museum
- Directors: Cindy Diehl Yang, president/CEO
- Public transit access: Davenport CitiBus
- Website: www.putnam.org

The Putnam Museum and Science Center, originally Davenport Academy of Natural Sciences, is a museum of history and natural science with an interactive science center in Davenport, Iowa, United States. The museum was founded in 1867 and was one of the first museums west of the Mississippi River. It houses around 250,000 historical artifacts and specimens in its collections. It is located at 1717 West 12th Street, at the corner of Division Street and West 12th Street on "museum hill," near Fejervary Park. It is an affiliate of the Smithsonian Institution.

== History ==
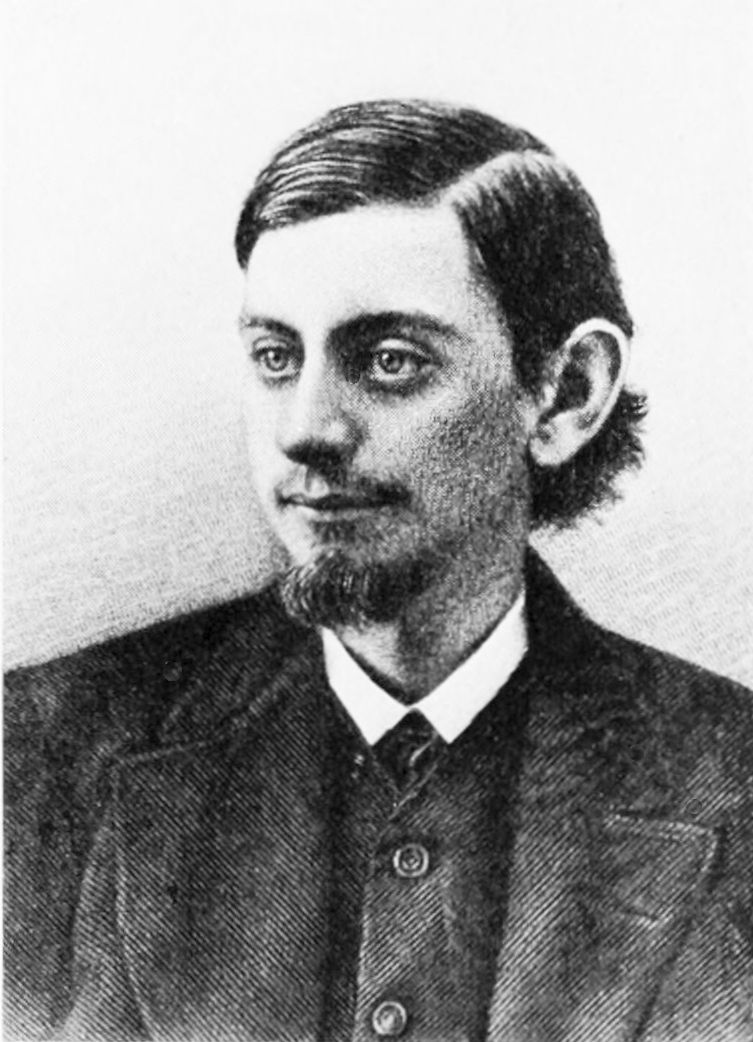
J. Duncan Putnam

The Davenport Academy of Natural Sciences was formed in 1867 by prominent collectors and community members in the Quad Cities. The membership base of the Davenport Academy quickly grew and eventually included Joseph Duncan Putnam (1855–1881) and Mary Louisa Duncan, his mother. Later, the academy was renamed after the Putnam family.

There have been a number of names for the institution: Davenport Academy of Natural Sciences, 1867–1900; Davenport Academy of Sciences, 1900–1927; Davenport Public Museum, 1927–1970; Davenport Museum, 1970–1974; Putnam Museum, 1974–1990; Putnam Museum of History and Natural Science, 1990–2014; and Putnam Museum and Science Center, 2014–present.

In 1997, the museum began losing money on operations and started to use its endowment to make up the shortfall. In 2002, the museum opened an IMAX theater at a cost of $14.5 million for which the board of directors took out a loan. The theater became a money maker for the institute, but the debt added to its losses. The development director left in December 2005, followed by the executive director, Chris Reich, in January 2006. Mark Bawden became the interim director and raised enough funds by April 2007 to retire the IMAX debt. He then stepped down to the development director post so that Kim Findlay could start as the new executive director on May 15, 2007. As development director, Bawden started a campaign to replenish the endowments.

In 2010, The Putnam Museum began to consider stepping away from the IMAX brand as another IMAX theater opened in Davenport. They ultimately removed its IMAX system for twin DLP projectors in June 2012. They then became affiliated with National Geographic Cinema Ventures' Museum Partnership Program.

The Putnam Museum began hosting large traveling exhibits, including King Tut Princess Diana, an Exhibition and the Titanic under Kim Findlay's leadership. The Immerse education program, which served area Title 1 schools, was also started during her tenure.

On July 1, 2019, Rachael Mullins started as the president and CEO. During her time, multiple changes were made to the museum, including the opening of the World Culture Gallery and an update to the regional history gallery. In January 2021, the Putnam joined Museums for All offering discounted admission for households receiving assistance by presenting their EBT card.

In October, 2023, Rachael Mullins announced her retirement. A nationwide search began to fill the president and CEO position. The new president and CEO, Cindy Diehl Yang, was announced in June 2024. Shortly after, the Putnam Museum announced a new extension of hours and the beginning of a large construction project.In 2025, the Putnam announced plans to excavate and mount a Triceratops skeleton for the museum in 2027, the first dinosaur mount for any Iowa museum.

== Exhibits ==
The Putnam Museum has many exhibits, including Featured Exhibits which regularly change.

Black Earth, Big River is an exploration of the past and present habitats of the Quad-Cities region. The exhibit features a 718-gallon aquarium filled with river fish, a walk-through cave, and a huge oak tree. Habitats and wildlife are explained throughout the exhibit, along with stories and taxidermy wildlife of the region.

Common Ground: Our Voice, Our Stories (previously River, Prairie, and People) explores regional history through a diverse array of stories and objects.

Fossils and Minerals features rotating displays from the museum's rock, mineral and gem collections as well as their paleontology collections.

Hall of Mammals explains various mammals through many means. Photographs, hands-on activities, and realistic dioramas are all provided in this multi-sensory exhibit.

Quad Cities Innovators tells the stories of local inventors and innovators from the region. Objects included are a bread slicing machine, an early automobile, and a chiropractic chair.

The Science Center is part of the museum's focus on science, technology, engineering and math (STEM) education, and supports national and statewide efforts to increase STEM skills. The area features large-scale interactives.

Unearthing Ancient Egypt uses artifacts and interactive displays to teach the community about ancient life in Egypt. Included in the exhibit are two mummies, canopic jars, sarcophagi, and ancient writing systems.

World Culture Gallery features artifacts from the world travels of some of the museum's founders such as the Putnam, Palmer, and Figge families.

== See also ==
- List of science centers
