= Prospect Park Historic District (Davenport, Iowa) =

Historic district in Iowa, United States

- U.S. National Register of Historic Places
- U.S. Historic district
- Davenport Register of Historic Properties
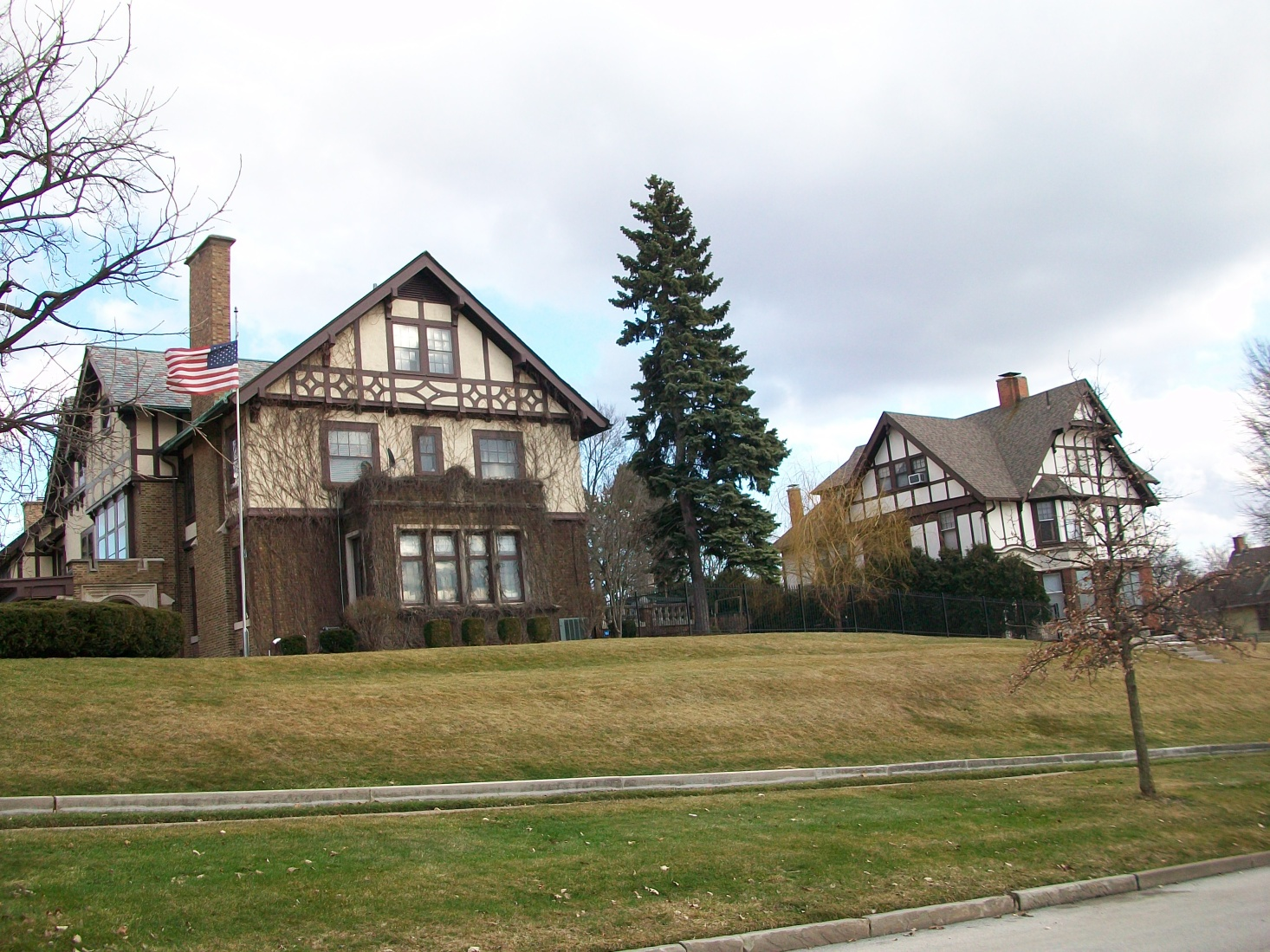
- The Edward C. Cressett House (left) and the Parke T. Burrows House

- Location within Iowa Location within the United States

- Location within city
- Location: Roughly bounded by E. River Dr., Mississippi Ave., Prospect Terr., 11th and Adams St., Davenport, Iowa
- Coordinates: 41°31′47″N 90°33′9″W
- Area: 23.2 acres (9.4 ha)
- Built: 1895-1925
- Architect: Temple & Burrows; et al.
- Architectural style: Neoclassical; Tudor Revival
- MPS: Davenport MRA
- NRHP reference No.: 84000338
- DRHP No.: 15

Significant dates
- Added to NRHP: November 1, 1984
- Designated DRHP: August 4, 1993

The Prospect Park Historic District in Davenport, Iowa, United States, is a historic district that was listed on the National Register of Historic Places in 1984. In its 23.2-acre (9.4 ha) area, it included 23 contributing buildings in 1984. The Prospect Park hill was listed on the Davenport Register of Historic Properties in 1993.

== History ==
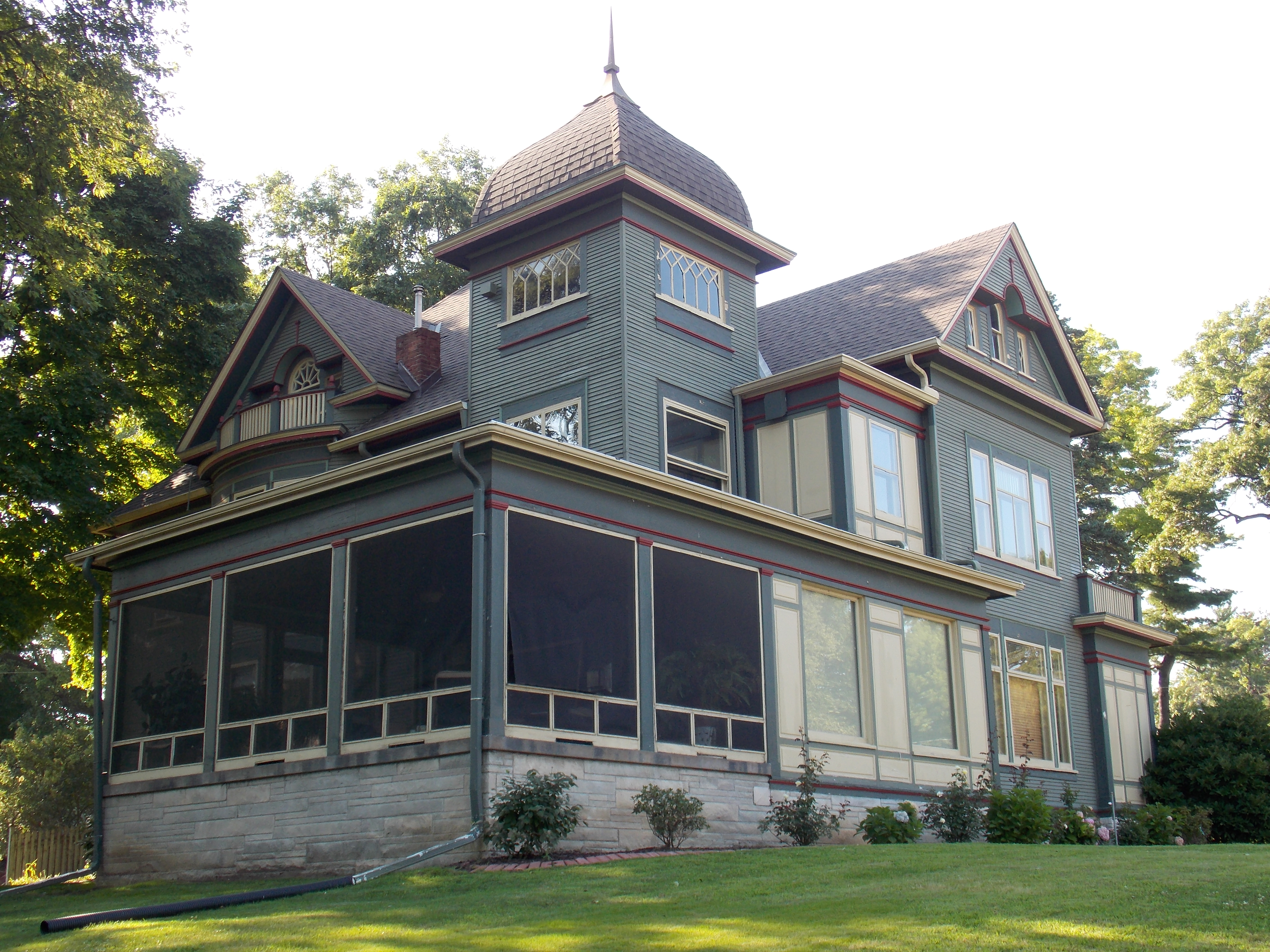
Ralph Lindsay House

The historic district is a small neighborhood located on the western border of the Village of East Davenport. It runs along Mississippi Avenue from Eleventh Street down to East River Drive and a block east along Prospect Drive and Prospect Terrace. For the most part the land was platted in 1894 by the Prospect Park Company. Several prominent Davenport businessmen were counted among its primary investors. The park land was acquired by the Davenport Board of Parks Commissioners in the same year. It was part of a city program to develop public parks throughout Davenport. Other parks in the program included Vander Veer, Riverview Terrace, and Fejervary. The neighborhood itself was developed from 1895 to 1910, and is one of many Davenport neighborhoods around the start of the 20th century to focus around a park. The neighborhood housed many prominent figures, including contractors, physicians, and attorneys. The proximity to and commanding view of the Mississippi River kept this neighborhood fashionable long after the original families had departed. Unlike similar west end and central neighborhoods, Prospect Park has retained mostly single family usage.

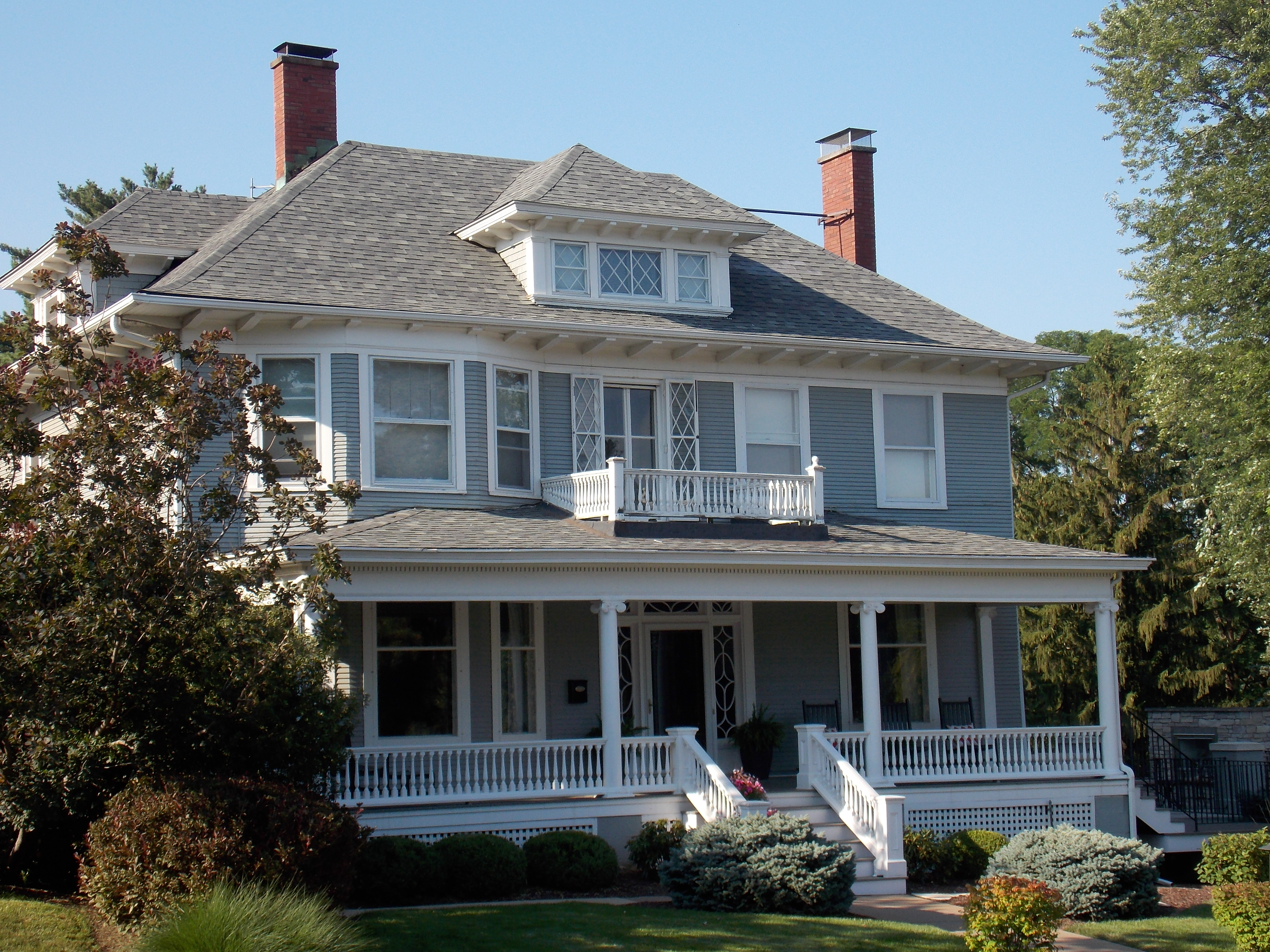
Anna McClelland House

The neighborhood included three "family enclaves" that are associated with individuals who were active in Davenport's commercial and industrial history in the late 19th and early 20th century. The Lanes lived on the upper end of Mississippi Avenue. Joseph R. Lane (1017 Mississippi) was an attorney, businessman, investor, and a one-term Republican U.S. Representative from Iowa's 2nd congressional district. His carriage house is one of the few of its size that remain in the city. One of his sons, Dick (1005 Mississippi), had a large cross-gambrel house to the south. Another son, Reed (1008 Mississippi), lived across the street in a multi-gabled house. The Richardson family lived beyond Prospect Park. They were involved with the Davenport Democrat and the Lee newspaper syndicate. Jenness, who was secretary and treasurer of the Democrat Company, lived in a frame Neoclassical house at 1802 East River Drive. His brother Morris, secretary of the Richardson Land and Timber Company, lived next door in a frame Shingle style house at 1810. The McClelland's were involved in a major 19th century contracting firm of T.W. McClelland & Company. Wilson, who was heir to the estate, lived at 1820 East River Drive, and his mother, Anna, lived at 1616 Prospect Drive overlooking the park.

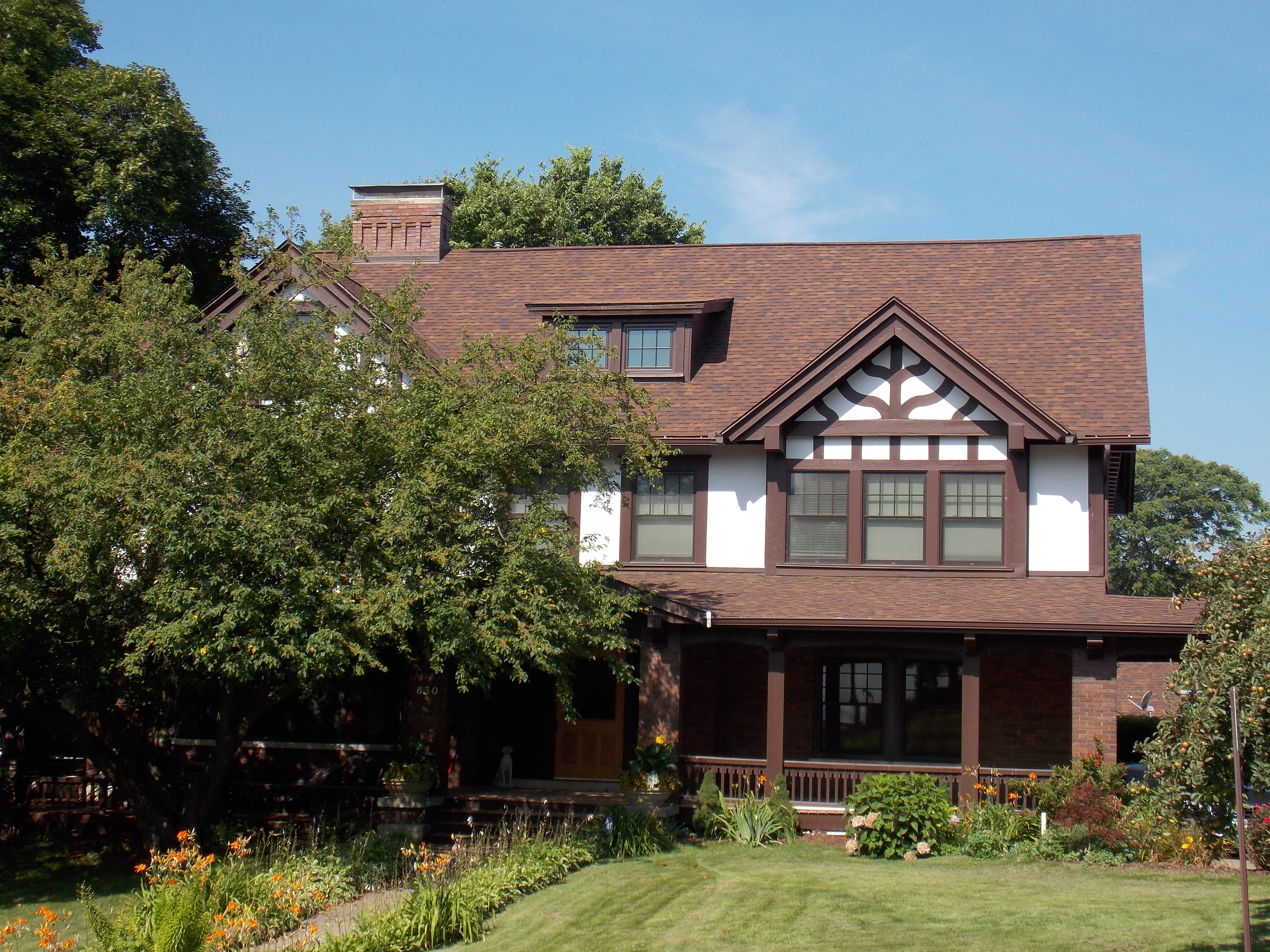
Rowland Harned House

Other significant people to Davenport economic life who lived in the neighborhood included Charles J. von Maur (1800 East River Drive) and Rowland Harned (830 Mississippi). They were partners in a local department store, Harned-Von Maur, that grew into the department store chain Von Maur. Davenport architect Parke T. Burrows, of the prominent local firm of Temple and Burrows, designed his Tudor Revival-style home at 935 Mississippi Avenue. He lived next door to lumber baron Edward S. Crossett in another Burrows-designed Tudor house. Other people involved in the lumber industry included Jules J. DeLescaille (901 Mississippi) and Ralph Lindsay, vice-president of the Lindsay-Phelps Company (224 Prospect Terrace).

== Architecture ==
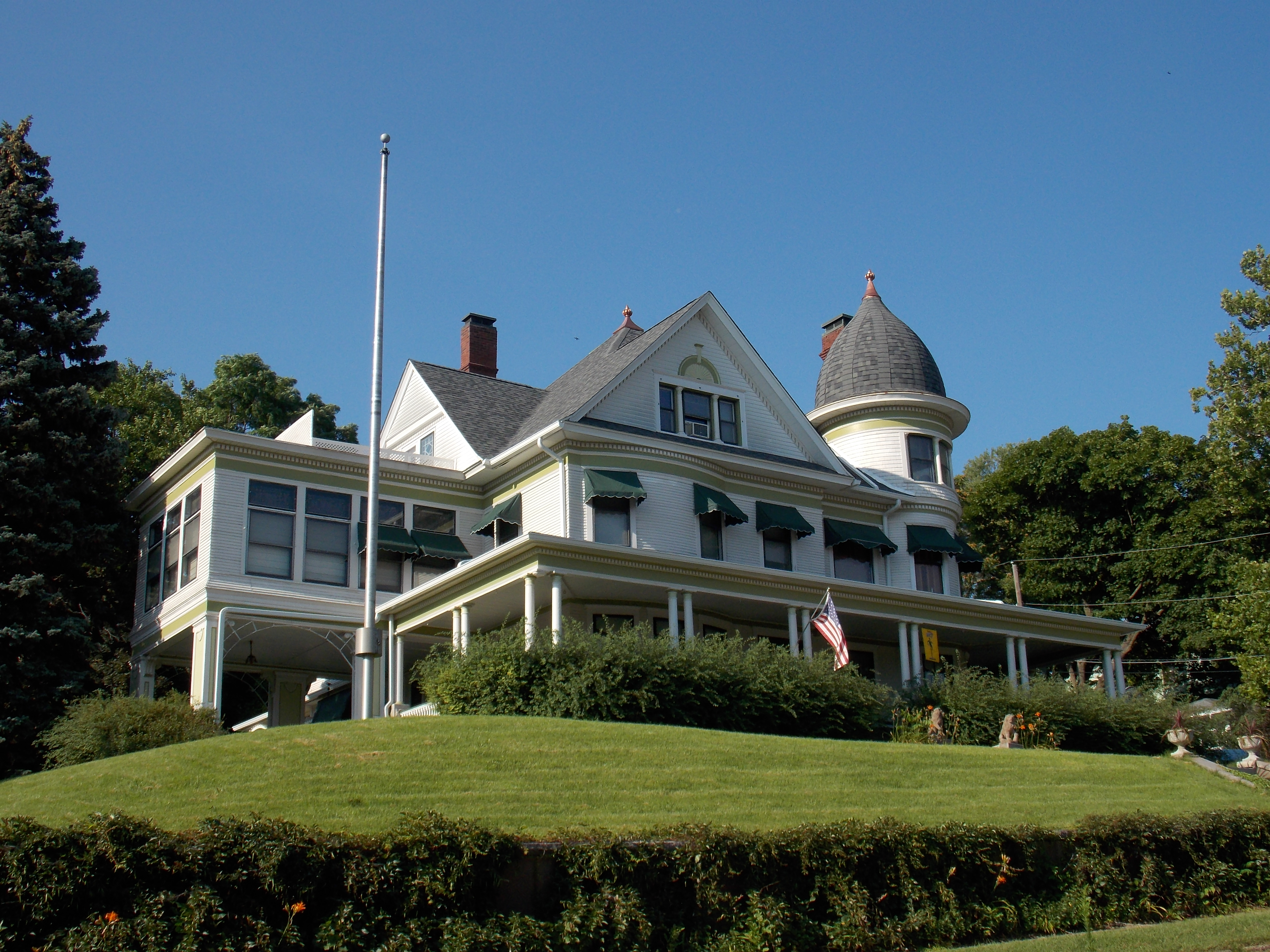
Jules deLescaille House

Houses in Prospect Park are very large, and are set back on spacious lots. The houses are late Queen Anne style, Neoclassical, and Tudor Revival and date from 1895 to 1925. One of the most prominent houses in the district is Hillside, a Georgian Revival style house located on the crest of the bluff at East River Drive and Mississippi Avenue. There is also a brick apartment building built after 1925 at 1022 Mississippi Avenue that does not fit in well with the surrounding single-family houses.

The neighborhood is architecturally distinct from those that surround it. Although it also contains large single-family homes, the Fulton Addition to the west dates primarily from the 1870s and 1880s. It includes the largely Victorian-style houses of the Bridge Avenue Historic District. The Mount Ida and East Davenport neighborhoods located to the north and east respectively were developed from the mid-1850s until well into the 20th century. They largely contain small-scale, closely spaced houses of working-class people.
