= Hillside (Davenport, Iowa) =

Historic house in Iowa, United States

- U.S. National Register of Historic Places
- U.S. Historic district – Contributing property
- Davenport Register of Historic Properties
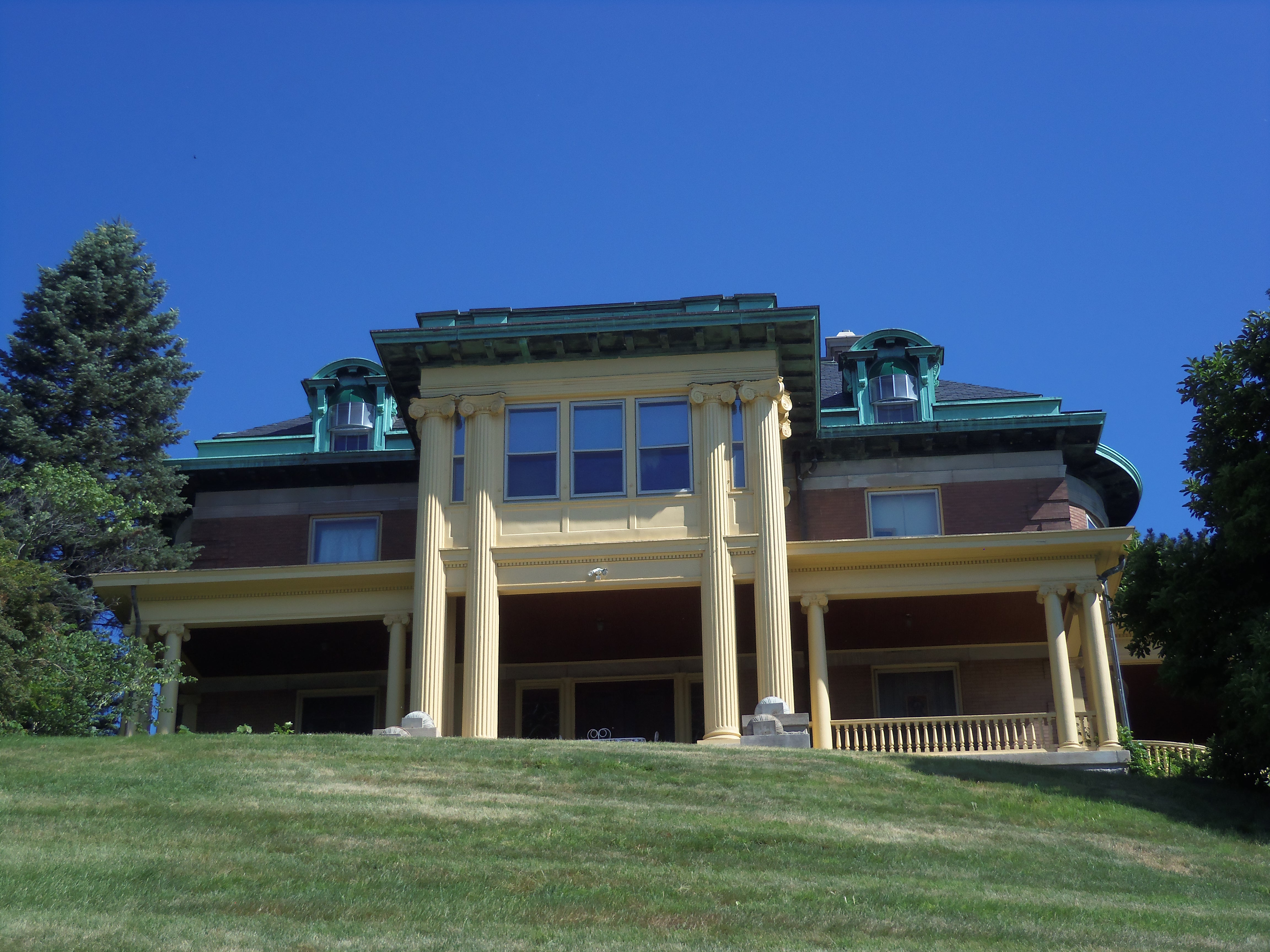

- Location within Iowa Location within the United States
- Location: 1 Prospect Dr. Davenport, Iowa
- Coordinates: 41°31′44″N 90°33′11″W
- Built: 1906
- Architect: Clausen & Clausen
- Architectural style: Georgian; Colonial Revival
- Part of: Prospect Park Historic District (ID84000338)
- NRHP reference No.: 82002640
- DRHP No.: 4

Significant dates
- Added to NRHP: February 4, 1982
- Designated DRHP: December 2, 1992

Hillside, also known as the Charles Schuler House, is a mansion overlooking the Mississippi River on the east side of Davenport, Iowa, United States. It has been individually listed on the National Register of Historic Places since 1982, and on the Davenport Register of Historic Properties since 1992. In 1984 it was included as a contributing property in the Prospect Park Historic District.

== Charles Schuler ==
The house was designed by prominent Davenport architect Frederick G. Clausen and built from 1905 to 1906 for Charles Schuler. He owned Schuler Coal, which operated coal mines in southern Illinois, Iowa, Colorado, and Wyoming. Schuler was also involved in the lumber and construction businesses and the president of several other companies, including a bank. He is credited as being one of the businessmen that helped Davenport grow from a small city to an important commercial center in the first part of the 20th century. The house remained in the Schuler family until the 1950s.

== Architecture ==
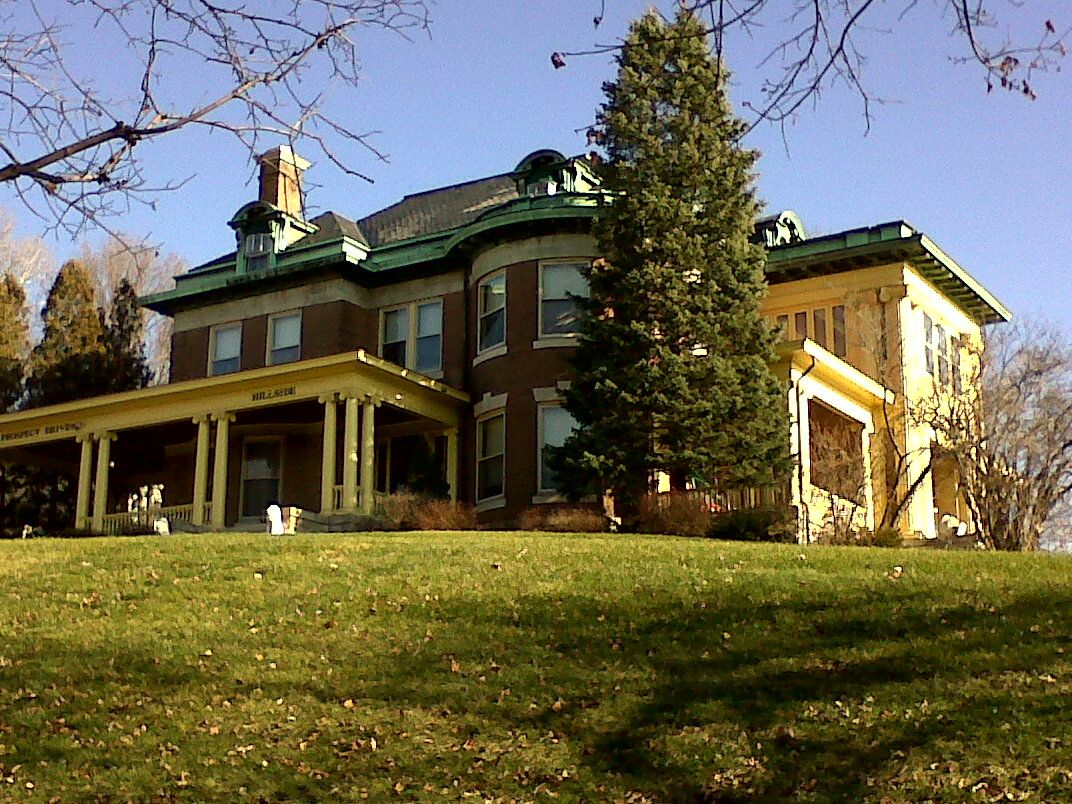
Hillside from Mississippi Avenue and River Drive

Hillside is considered a locally significant example of the Georgian Revival style. The house's design does not reflect the architectural features that were common in contemporary Victorian architecture, but incorporates elements of the Beaux-Arts and Art Nouveau styles.

The 2½-story mansion is a brick structure built on a limestone foundation. It follows a rectangular plan that features projecting semicircular bays or rectangular pavilions at the corners on the east and west sides. The home features a porte-cochere on the north side and porches on the east and west sides of the building. There is a porch that faces the south side that runs the length of the house whose floors are of hand-made mosaic tile. There is also a two-level projecting pavilion; the upper part of which was enclosed in the 1920s. The front columns are 30 feet (9 m) in height and feature fluted Ionic capitals. All of the secondary columns on the house are 15 feet (5 m) high. The structure is capped by a decked hipped roof with roof dormers that feature semicircular pediments above round arch windows. At the roofline is a copper cornice. The interior of the home features many of original architectural features, which include stained glass, three fireplaces, tapestry walls, pocket doors, and mahogany woodwork. The house is situated on a corner lot at the top of a bluff with a commanding view of the river.
