= Fejervary Park =

Public park in Davenport, Iowa

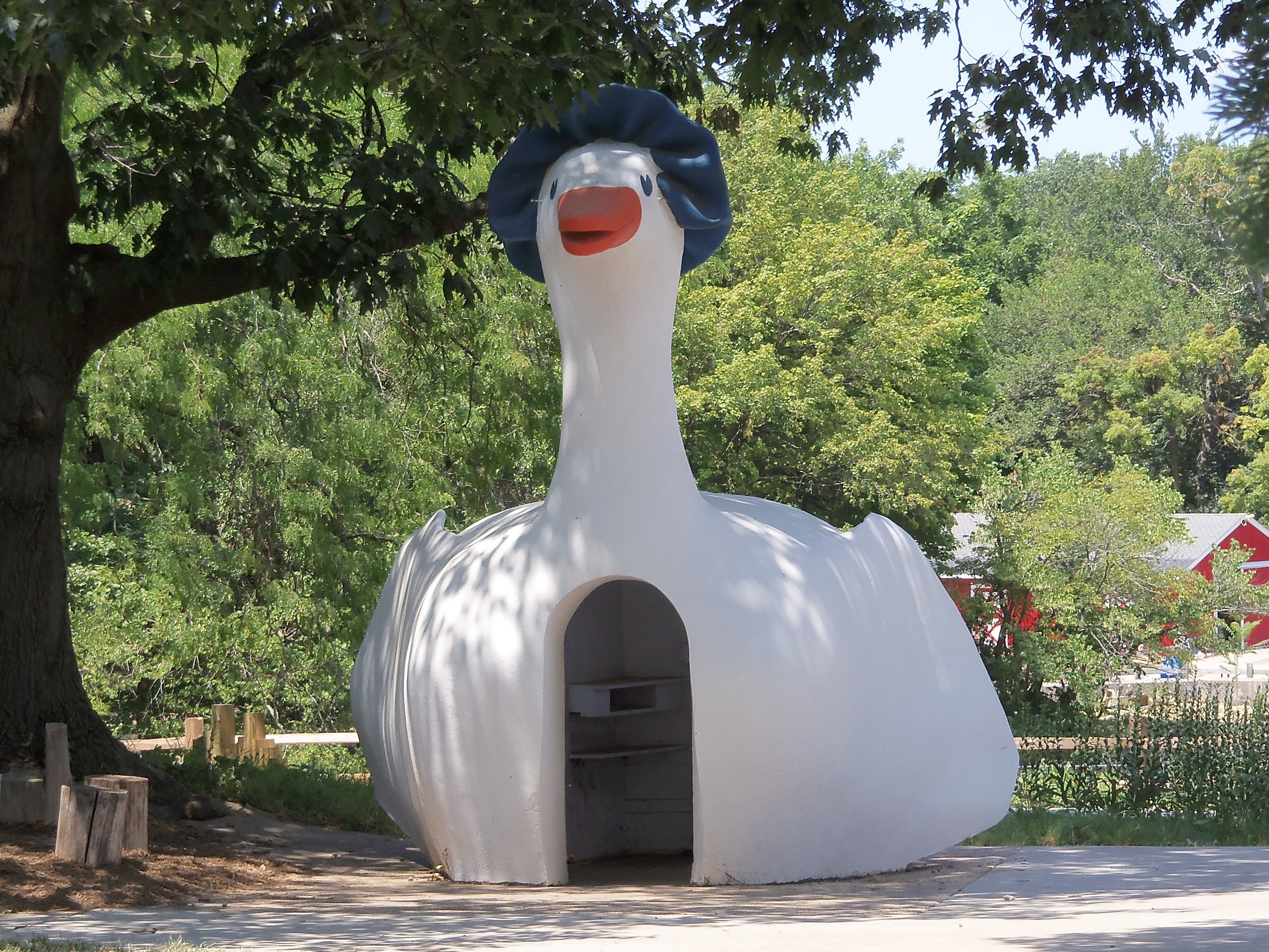
- Mother Goose Land entrance
- Interactive map of Fejervary Park
- Type: Public park
- Location: Davenport, Iowa
- Coordinates: 41°31′50″N 90°36′20″W
- Area: 75-acre (0.30 km^{2})
- Operator: Davenport Parks and Recreation
- Open: Year round
- Public transit: Davenport CitiBus

Davenport Register of Historic Properties
- Official name: Mother Goose
- Designated: February 7, 2007
- Reference no.: 36

Fejervary Park is located in the west end of Davenport, Iowa, United States. The 75-acre (0.30 km^{2}) park is dominated by rolling green grass hills and trees. It features play ground equipment and an aquatic center. The Putnam Museum is located just to the east of the park.

== History ==
The property for Fejervary Park was given to the city by Celestine Fejérváry, a daughter of Nicholas Fejérváry. He was a Hungarian nobleman who came to Davenport as a refugee in 1853 following the failure of an insurrection in his native Hungary. The park was the site of Fejervary’s estate. He chose the location for his home because the steep bluffs with a view of the Mississippi River reminded him of his home on the Danube River. The house, which was on the site at the time of the donation, is now gone. All that remains of the buildings is a carriage barn. The park land was acquired by the Davenport Board of Parks Commissioners as part of a city program to develop public parks throughout the city. Other parks in the program at the time included Vander Veer, Riverview Terrace, and Prospect.

A municipal zoo was added to the park in 1909. It became known as Mother Goose Land. Patrons would enter the zoo through a large Mother Goose structure. There was also a feature called Monkey Island. The Mother Goose entryway was listed on the Davenport Register of Historic Properties in 2007 and the zoo itself closed in 2008.
