= Vander Veer Botanical Park =

Botanical garden in Davenport, Iowa, U.S.

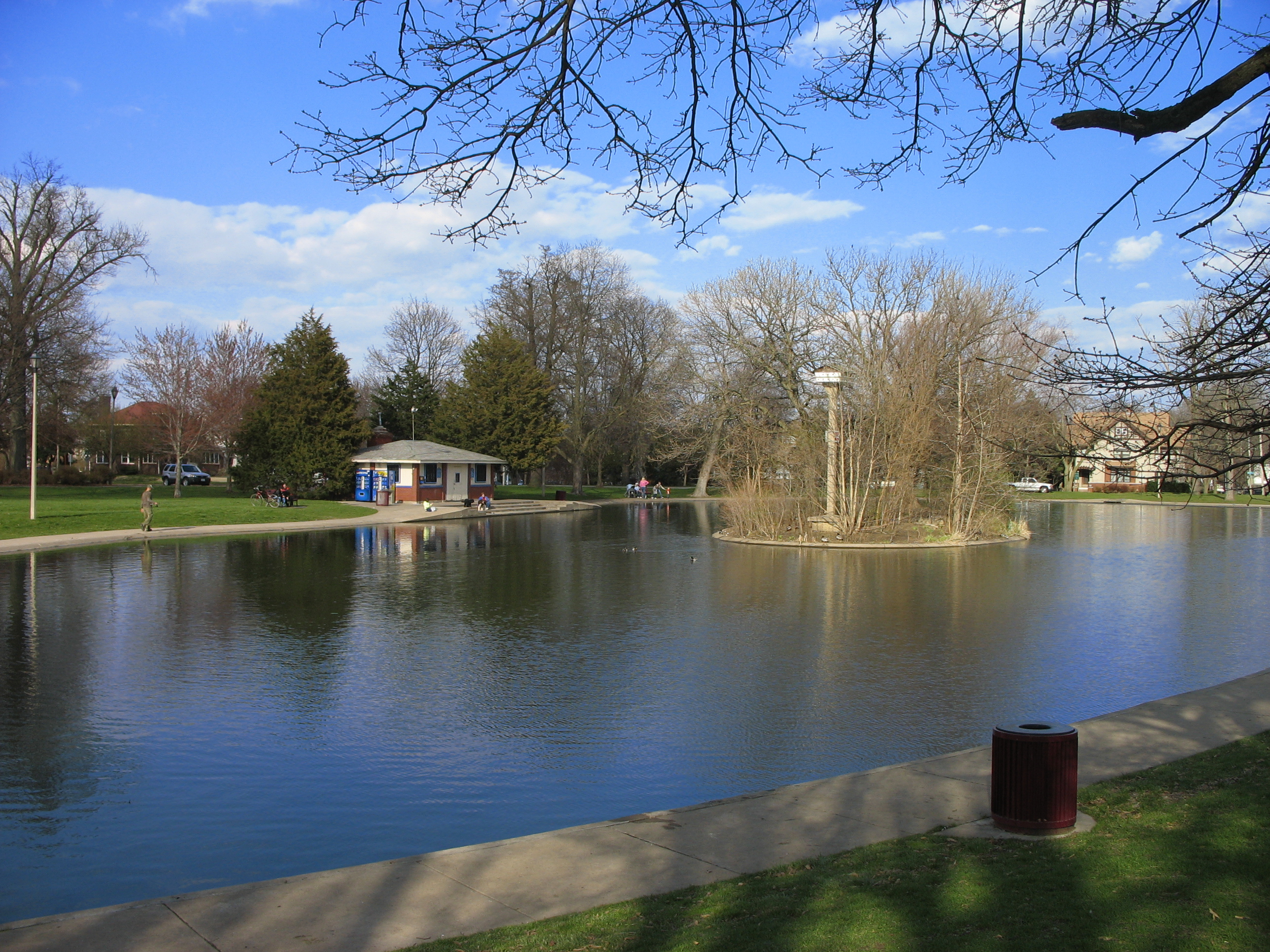
- The lagoon at Vander Veer Park
- Interactive map of Vander Veer Botanical Park
- Type: Public park
- Location: Davenport, Iowa
- Coordinates: 41°32′37.68″N 90°34′30.72″W
- Area: 33-acre (0.13 km^{2})
- Created: 1885
- Operator: Davenport Parks and Recreation
- Open: All year
- Public transit: Davenport CitiBus
- Vander Veer Botanical Park
- U.S. Historic district – Contributing property
- Davenport Register of Historic Properties
- Part of: Vander Veer Park Historic District (ID85000784)
- DRHP No.: 14

Significant dates
- Designated CP: April 9, 1985
- Designated DRHP: August 4, 1993

The Vander Veer Botanical Park is a 33-acre (130,000 m^{2}) botanical garden in the Vander Veer Park Historic District of Davenport, Iowa. It is believed to be one of the first botanical parks west of the Mississippi River. The park was listed on the Davenport Register of Historic Properties on August 4, 1993.

== History ==
Vander Veer Park was established in 1885. The city of Davenport purchased the land for $13,000 ($465,833 in 2025). The park was built on the old Scott County Fairgrounds land and modeled after New York City’s Central Park. Vander Veer was originally named Central Park. In 1912 the park was renamed after the first secretary of the Davenport Park Board of Commissioners, A.W. Vander Veer. A conservatory, music pavilion, and decorative fountains were added after World War I.

The park is currently maintained by the Davenport Parks and Recreation Horticulture team and supported by a nonprofit organization, The Friends of Vander Veer.

== Gallery ==
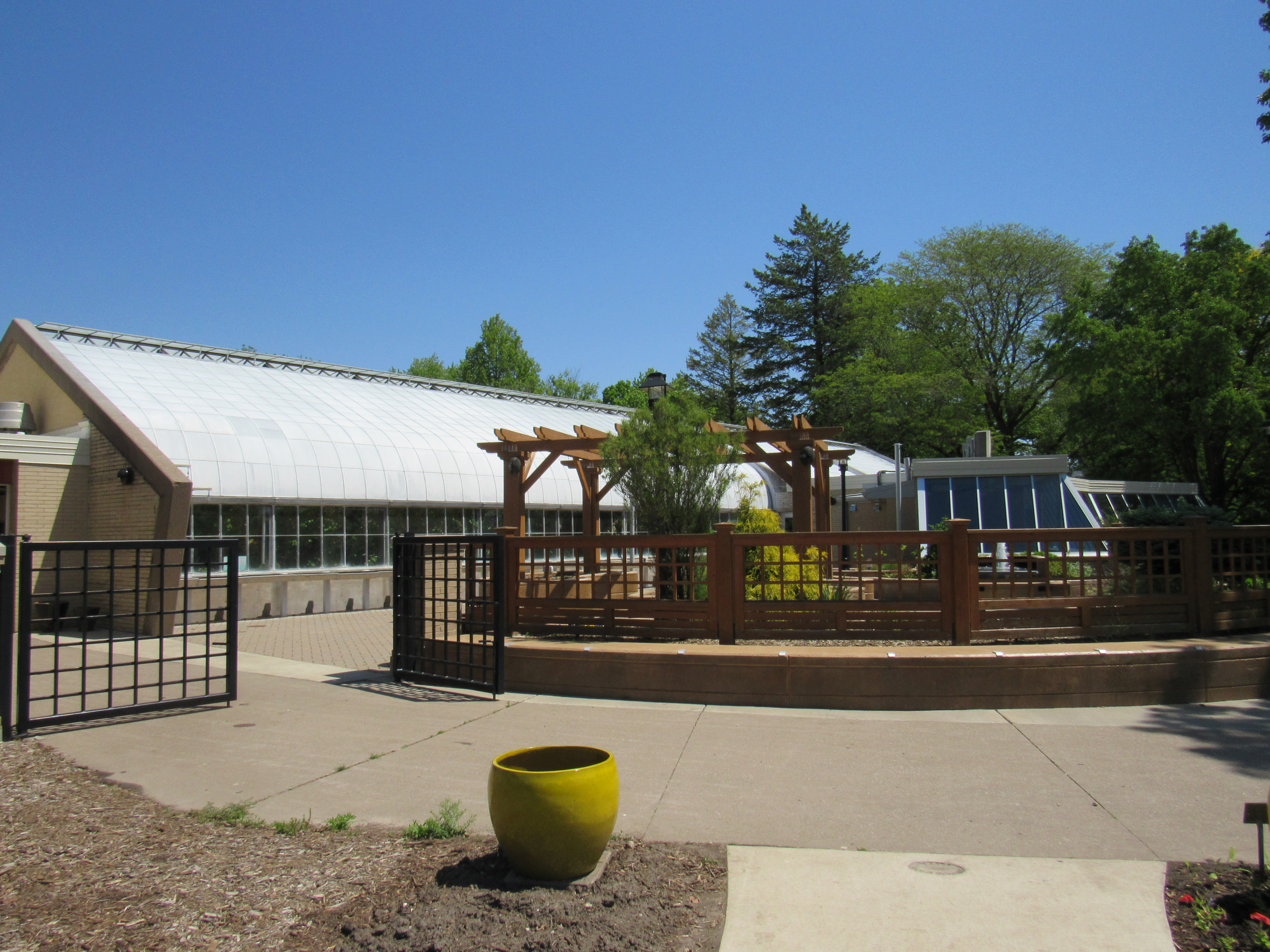
Conservatory

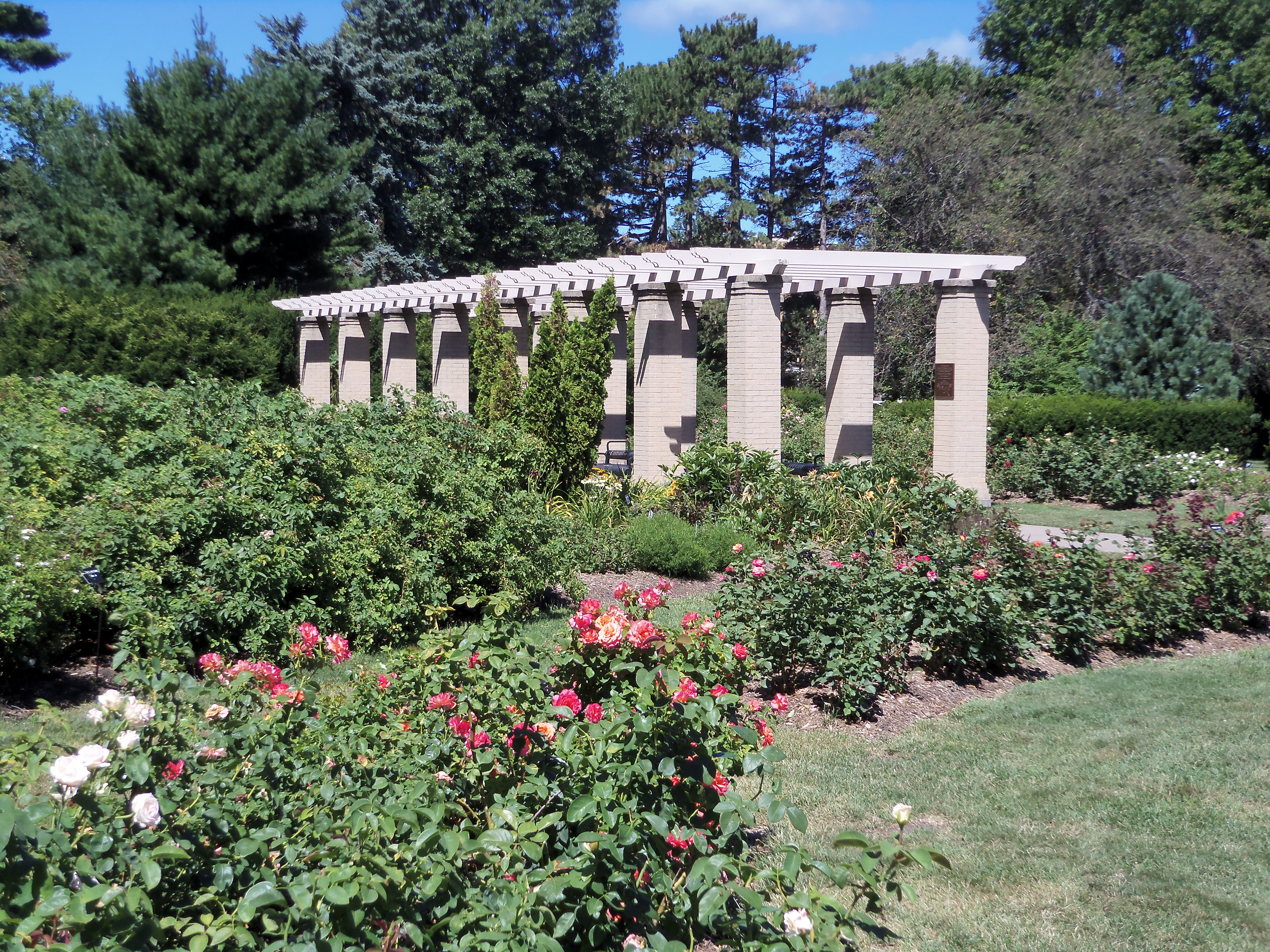
Rose Garden

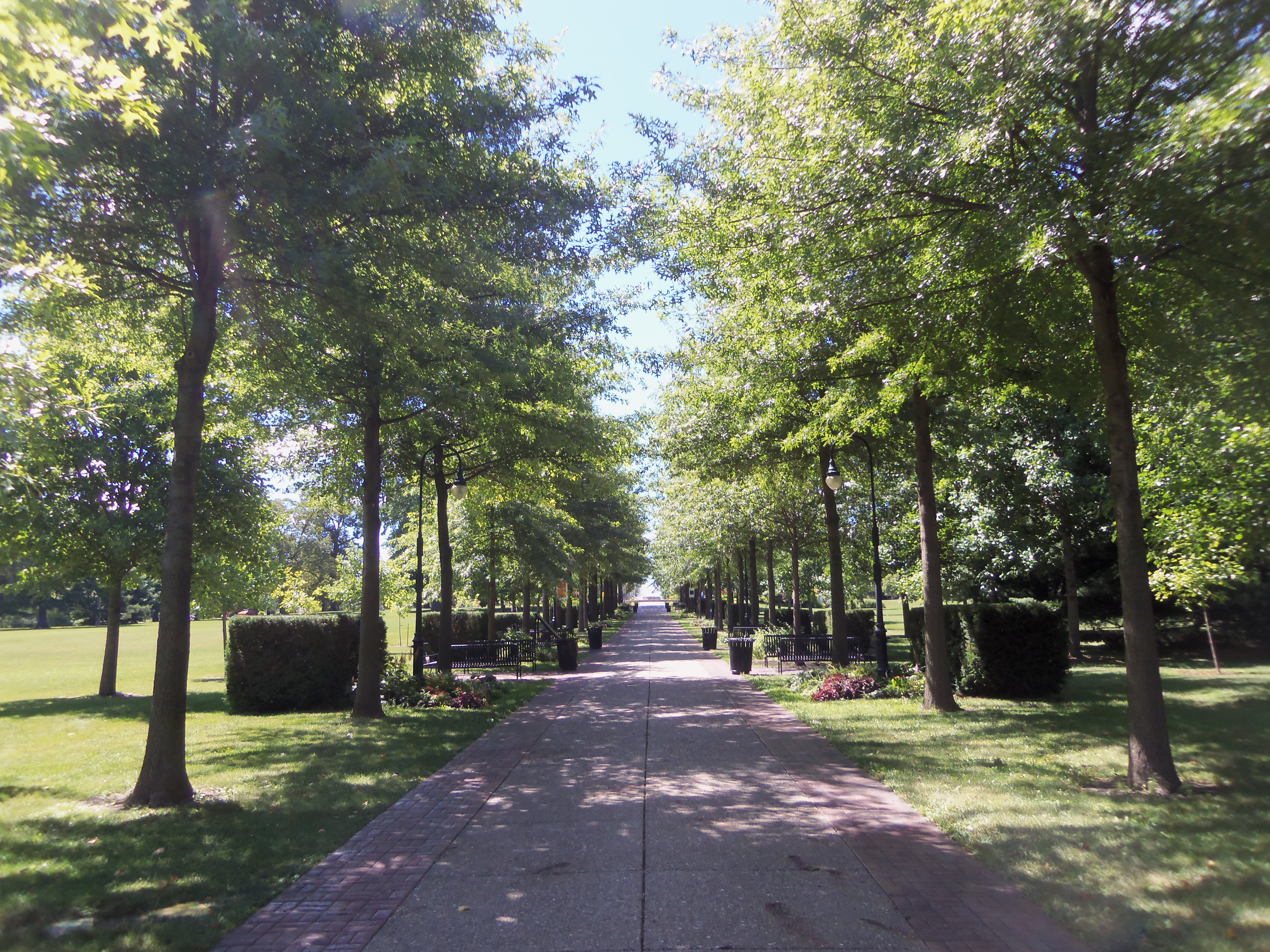
Grand Allee

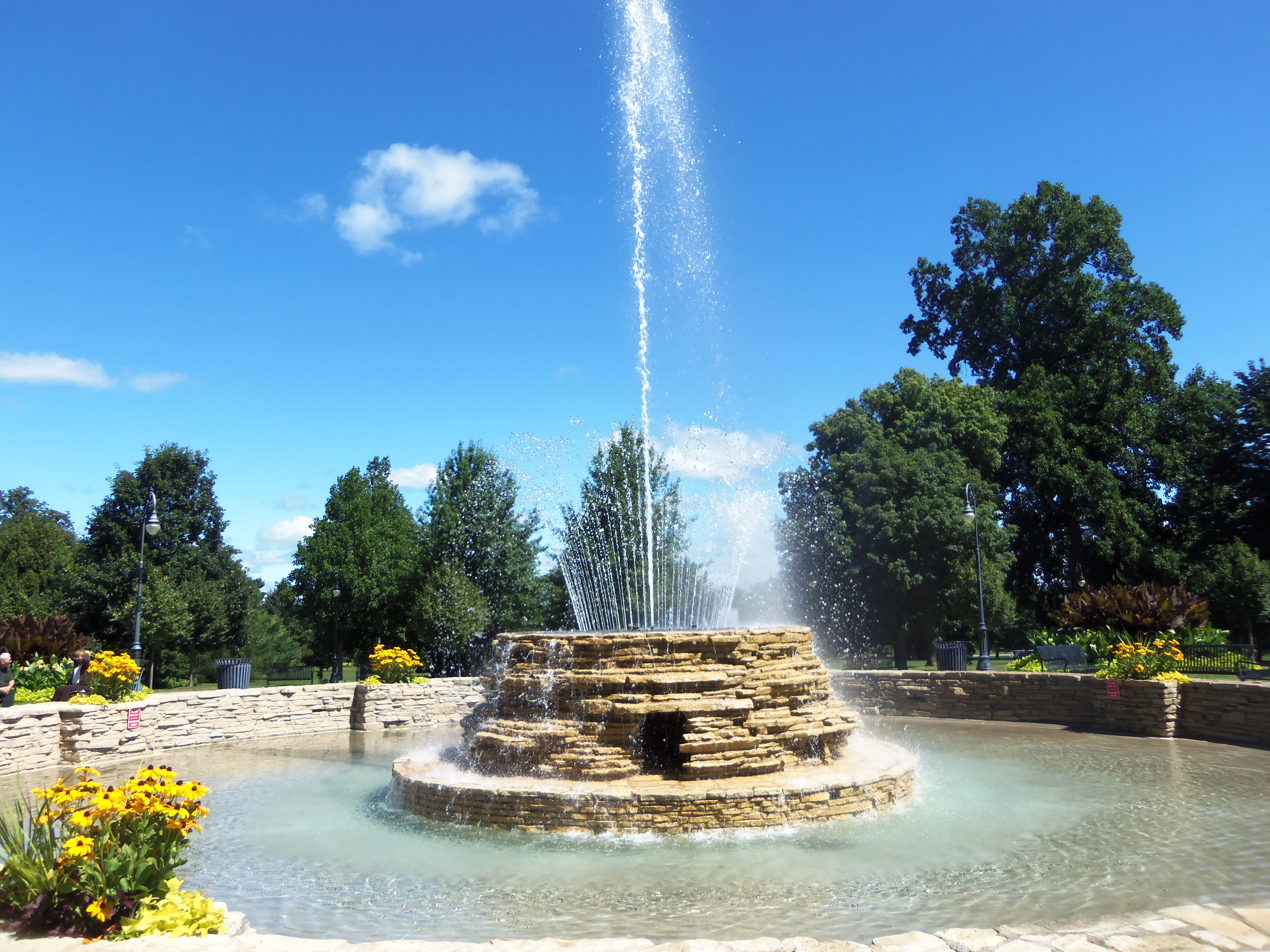
Fountain

== See also ==
- List of botanical gardens in the United States
