= Democrat Building =

- U.S. National Register of Historic Places
- U.S. Historic district – Contributing property
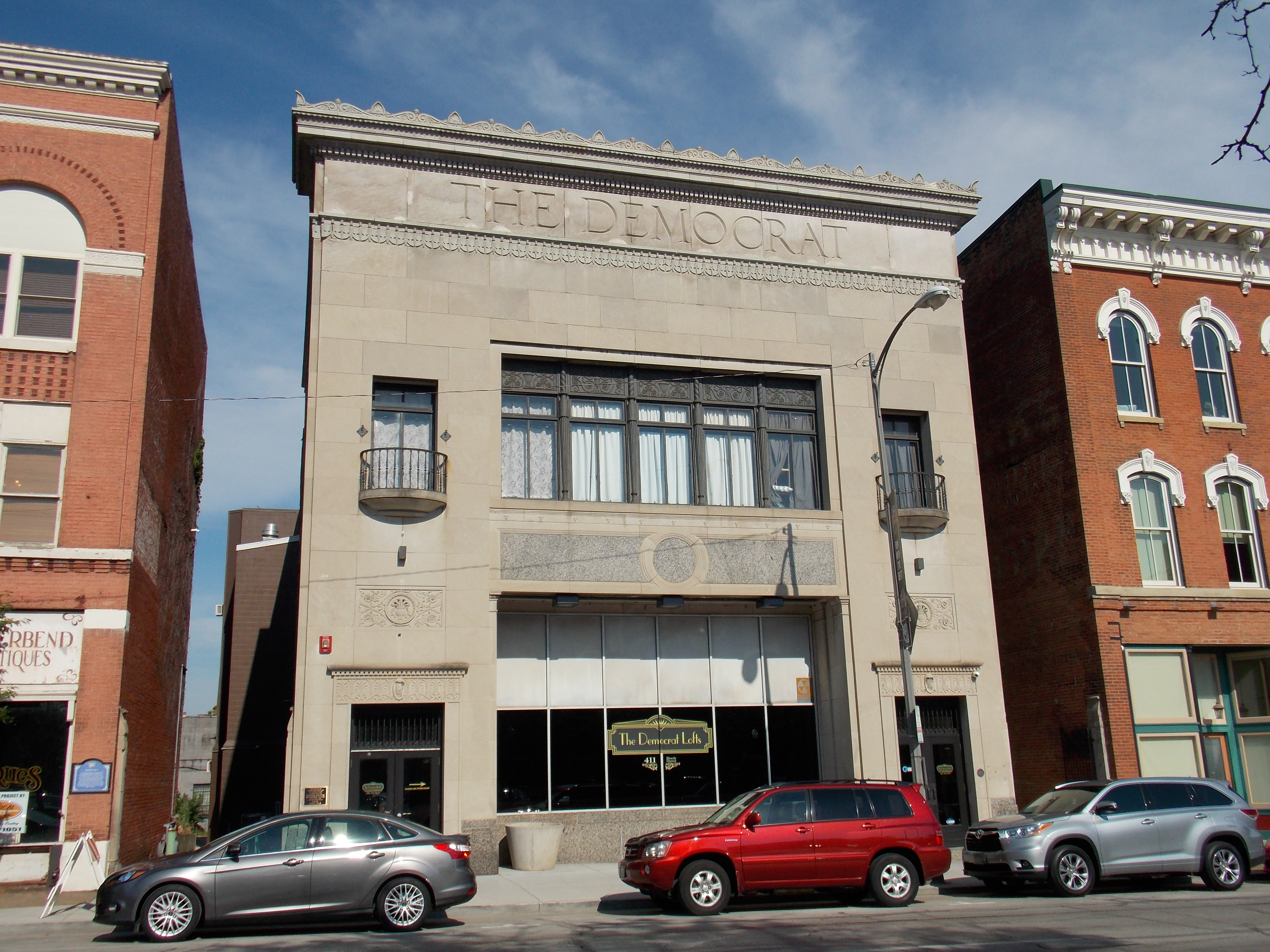

- Location within Iowa Location within the United States
- Location: 407-411 Brady St. Davenport, Iowa
- Coordinates: 41°31′26″N 90°34′26″W
- Area: less than one acre
- Built: 1923
- Architect: Rudolph J. Clausen
- Architectural style: Late 19th and Early 20th Century American Movements
- Part of: Davenport Downtown Commercial Historic District (ID100005546)
- MPS: Davenport MRA
- NRHP reference No.: 83002420
- Added to NRHP: July 7, 1983

Democrat Building is a historic building located in downtown Davenport, Iowa, United States. It was individually listed on the National Register of Historic Places in 1983. In 2020 it was included as a contributing property in the Davenport Downtown Commercial Historic District. The historic newspaper building is now an apartment building known as The Democrat Lofts.

== History ==
The Democrat Building was designed by a prominent Davenport architecture firm of Clausen & Kruse, and it was built in 1923. The firm also designed other historic buildings in Davenport including the Forrest Block, which is next door to the south, the Hibernia Hall, which is next door to the north, the Scott County Savings Bank, Davenport Municipal Stadium (now Modern Woodmen Park), The Linograph Company Building, and the W.D. Petersen Memorial Music Pavilion in LeClaire Park.

The building was built for a local newspaper the Davenport Democrat, which was started in 1848 as the Democratic Banner. Its editorial philosophy was in keeping with that of the political party of the same name. Over the years the paper purchased the Gazette (1887) and the Evening Leader (1902).

The paper was eventually bought by Lee Enterprises, which published the Daily Times. The merged newspapers became the Times-Democrat and is now known as the Quad-City Times. The building was sold to The Catholic Messenger, the newspaper for the Diocese of Davenport, in 1956. The building served as their headquarters for a couple of decades. The building also housed a dog training school, a vacuum cleaner salesroom, a dance hall and a specialty store. In 2014, a $6 million renovation turned the building into 21 apartments.

The building is considered significant because of its association with newspapers in Davenport, and as an example of the local influence of Louis Sullivan, whose work figures prominently in the history of American architecture.

== Architecture ==
The two-storied, freestanding, brick structure with concrete block facing was designed by Davenport architect Rudolph J. Clausen. A historical survey in 1983 indicated that the building utilizes steel in its construction. It was completed for about $300,000. The words “The Democrat” are etched across the top of the building. It bears the stylistic influence of Louis Sullivan's “jewel box” structures that are associated with the work he did late in his career in the Midwest. These influences are seen in the blocking of windows at the center of the highly geometric façade. The ornamentation of the horizontal band between stories, over the entrances, and along the parapet wall all feature the stylized motifs that are commonly found in his work.
