= Lend-A-Hand Club =

- Formerly listed on the U.S. National Register of Historic Places
- Lend-A-Hand Club

- Location within Iowa Location within the United States
- Location: 105 S. Main St. Davenport, Iowa
- Coordinates: 41°31′30″N 90°34′26″W
- Area: less than one acre
- Built: 1923
- Architect: Frederick G. Clausen
- Architectural style: Renaissance Revival
- MPS: Davenport MRA
- NRHP reference No.: 83002525

Significant dates
- Added to NRHP: July 7, 1983
- Removed from NRHP: December 19, 2014

The Lend-A-Hand Club was located in downtown Davenport, Iowa, United States, along the riverfront. It was listed on the National Register of Historic Places in 1983.

== History ==
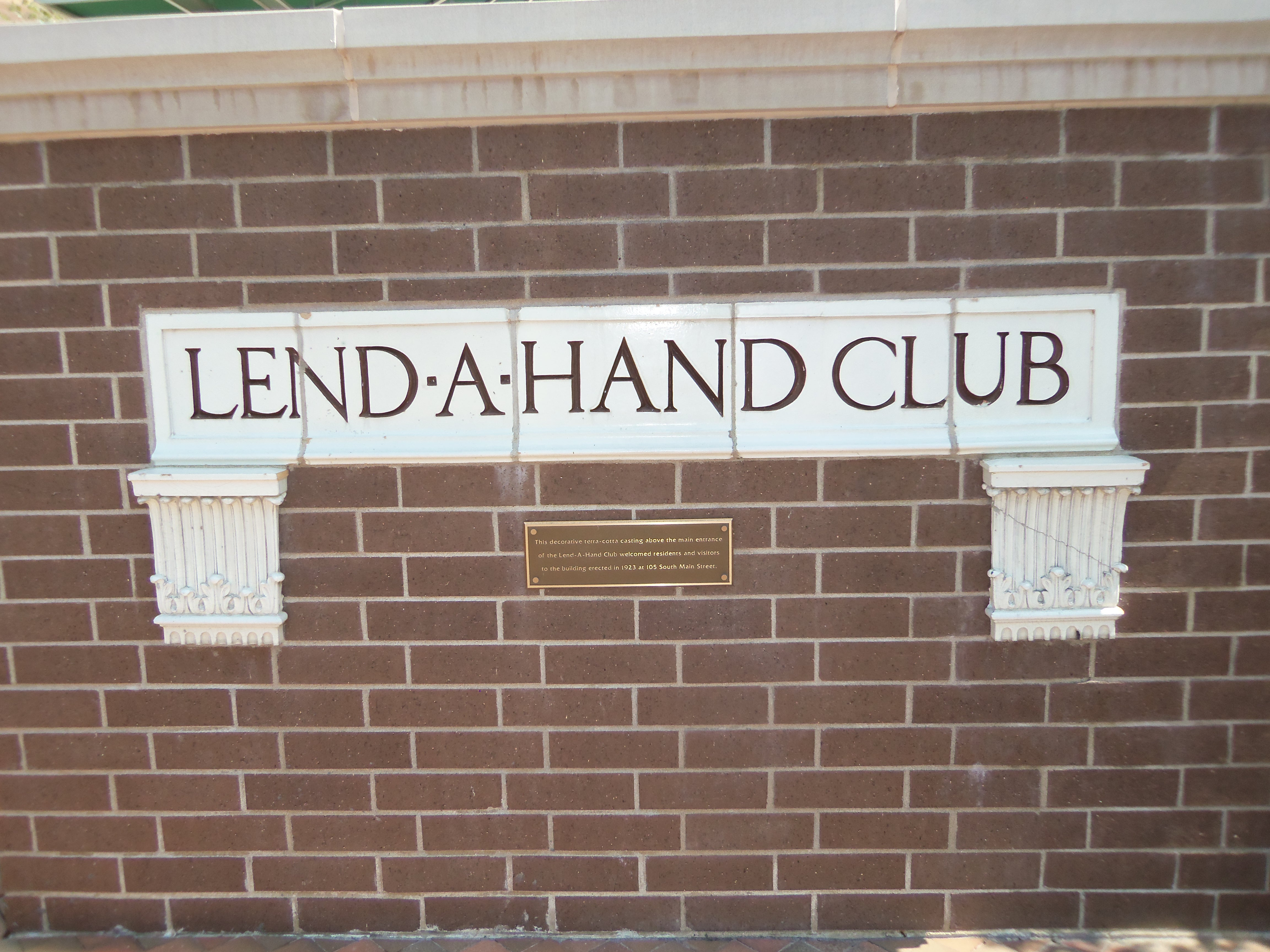
The Lend-A-Hand sign from the old building at the new facility at Third and Ripley Streets

The Lend-A-Hand Club was established in Davenport in 1886 as a chapter of the International Order of the King's Daughters and Sons. It became an affiliate of the national network of Lend-A-Hand Clubs launched during the 1870s by Edward Everett Hale, a Unitarian minister who had risen to nationwide prominence as an abolitionist and writer for the Atlantic Monthly prior to the American Civil War. The club was a place for young women who lived and worked away from home to associate in a safe environment.

Initially, it occupied various downtown locations that it rented. When it was housed in a department store it offered rest and reading rooms. When it moved to larger facilities it expanded to a cafeteria, reading rooms, parlor, shower and bath, laundry, arts and crafts, and a gymnasium. It also provided a lecture series on various women's topics. The Lend-A-Hand Club was the city's main woman's service facility and usurped any potential for the YWCA to establish itself in Davenport.

Money was raised and in 1922 a permanent location was secured and a building was constructed along South Main Street opposite the Dillon Memorial. The facility contained dormitory rooms, a lounge, cafeteria, and a swimming pool. Its construction was a part of major riverfront improvements there were completed in Davenport between 1912 and 1931. Programs offered by the club covered women's issues as bicycling for women, the pros and cons of women working outside the home, woman's suffrage, and other topics.

The building closed as a woman's facility in the 1960s. It was rented to the city of Davenport who converted it to elderly housing in 1973. A new building was constructed for the elderly at Third and Ripley Streets in the late 1980s and the Lend-A-Hand Club building was torn down in 1990. It was removed from the National Register in 2014.

== Architecture ==
The Lend-A-Hand Club was a three-story, brick, U-shaped building that was built over a raised basement. It was designed by Davenport architect Frederick G. Clausen in the Renaissance Revival style. It featured terracotta pilasters and cornice. Four decorative urns were located on the parapet. The shape of the building allowed the residential spaces to receive full natural light and air circulation. The main floor was a rectangular box that housed the social service elements of the facility.

== See also ==
- International Order of the King's Daughters and Sons

Other buildings designed by Frederick G. Clausen:

- Davenport Crematorium
- Hibernia Hall
- Hillside Mansion
- J.H.C. Petersen's Sons' Store
