= Central Office Building =

- U.S. National Register of Historic Places
- U.S. Historic district – Contributing property
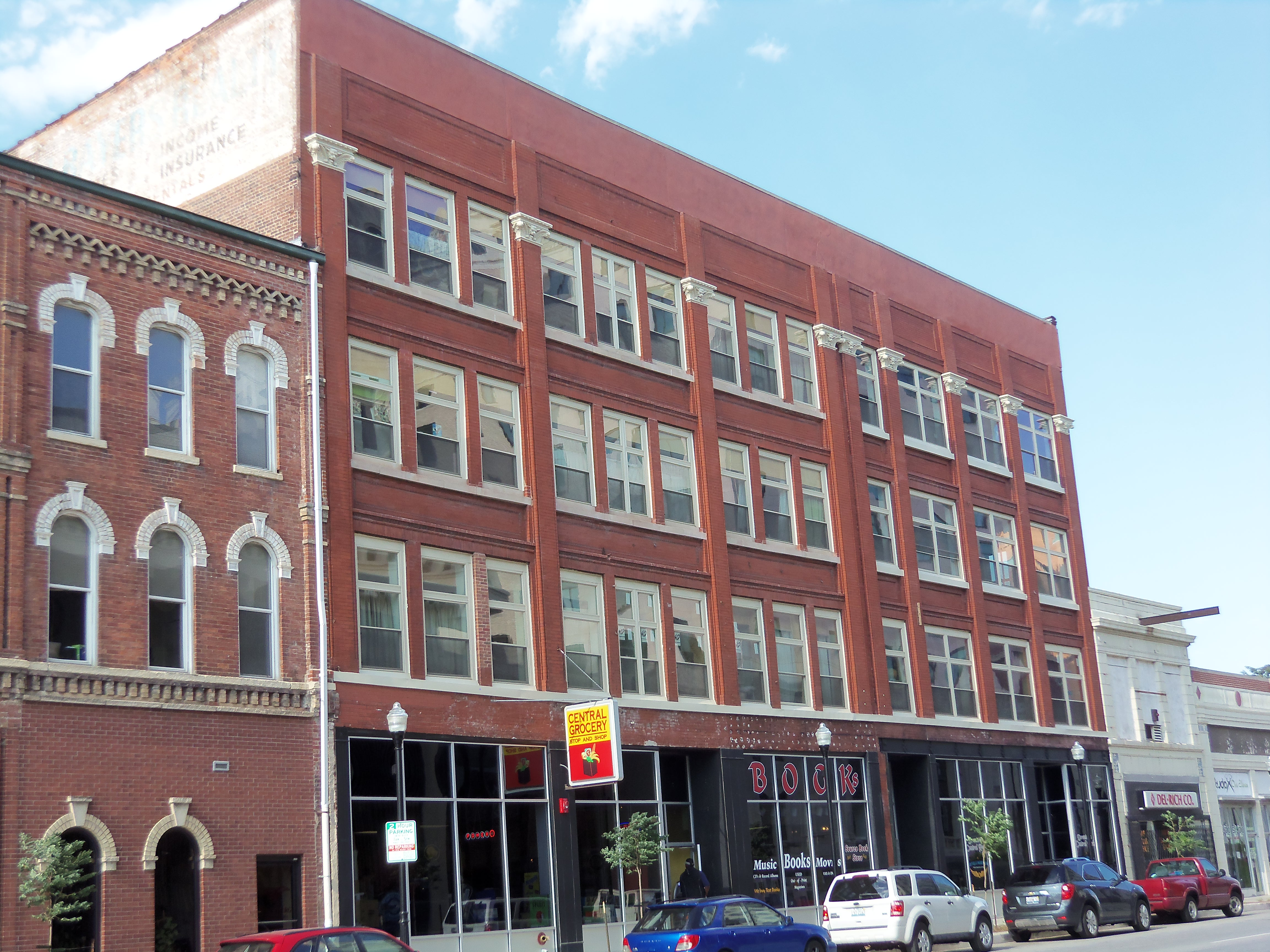

- Location within Iowa Location within the United States
- Location: 230 W. 3rd St. Davenport, Iowa
- Coordinates: 41°31′21″N 90°34′35″W
- Area: less than one acre
- Built: 1904, 1906
- Architect: Gustav Hansen; Clausen & Clausen
- Architectural style: Early Commercial
- Part of: Davenport Downtown Commercial Historic District (ID100005546)
- MPS: Davenport MRA
- NRHP reference No.: 83002411
- Added to NRHP: July 7, 1983

Central Office Building is a historic building located in downtown Davenport, Iowa, United States. It has been individually listed on the National Register of Historic Places since 1983. In 2020 it was included as a contributing property in the Davenport Downtown Commercial Historic District. It is located in the center of a block with other historic structures. It now houses loft apartments.

== History ==
The Central Office Building was built in two phases. The western half of the building is the oldest section of the structure that began in the 1850s as a brick church. It was remodeled into a 4-story building sometime between 1866 and 1881 by the Woeber Brothers for their carriage production facility and showroom. In 1887, Henry F. Petersen, who owned the J.H.C. Petersen's Sons' Store on Second and Main Streets, had the carriage building remodeled for a furniture store. Petersen was prominent in wholesale and retail goods in the city and his buildings housed his various interests. In 1904, Gustav Hansen designed the first phase of Petersen’s Central Office Building for $24,000. Two years later Clausen & Clausen designed the second phase. The building was constructed with retail businesses housed on the street level and office space above. Some of the early businesses included Spencer Furniture Company, Schiller Piano Company, and the Huebotter Furniture Company. Multiple retailers continue to fill the street level. Architectural firm Clausen & Kruse, formerly known as Clausen & Clausen, had offices on the third floor of the Central Office Building. The upper floors have subsequently been converted into loft apartments.

== Architecture ==
The building is four stories and constructed of brick. The façade is divided into seven bays with three bays on either side of a central bay that contains a stairwell to serve the upper floors. The pier and spandrel facade suggests the building's structural system, and it was used again in the J.H.C. Petersen's Sons Wholesale Building and that was also built by Petersen and designed by Clausen & Clausen. While it appears symmetrical at first closer inspection reveals that it is not. The bays on the west are sized to accommodate groups of three double-hung windows. The bays of the east are narrower and are designed to accommodate a pair of double-hung windows. The building also features pilasters with rolled edges and homed gargoyles that run through the upper elevation of the building. A simple cornice tops the building and raised parapets mark the two portions of the building.

The building shows elements of the Victorian and the Chicago Commercial styles. The cornice and the grotesques on the capitals are all Victorian while the expression of the structure in the façade reflects the Commercial.
