= Frederick G. Clausen =

Danish-born American architect (1848–1940)

Frederick George "Fritz" (Friedrich Georg) Clausen (1848–1940) was a Danish-born architect who came to the United States in 1869 and founded an architectural practice in Davenport, Iowa. The firm that he founded, presently named Studio 483 Architects, is still in business today, the oldest firm in continuous practice in the state of Iowa. Clausen has been termed the "premier 19th century architect" of Davenport, Iowa.

== Personal life ==
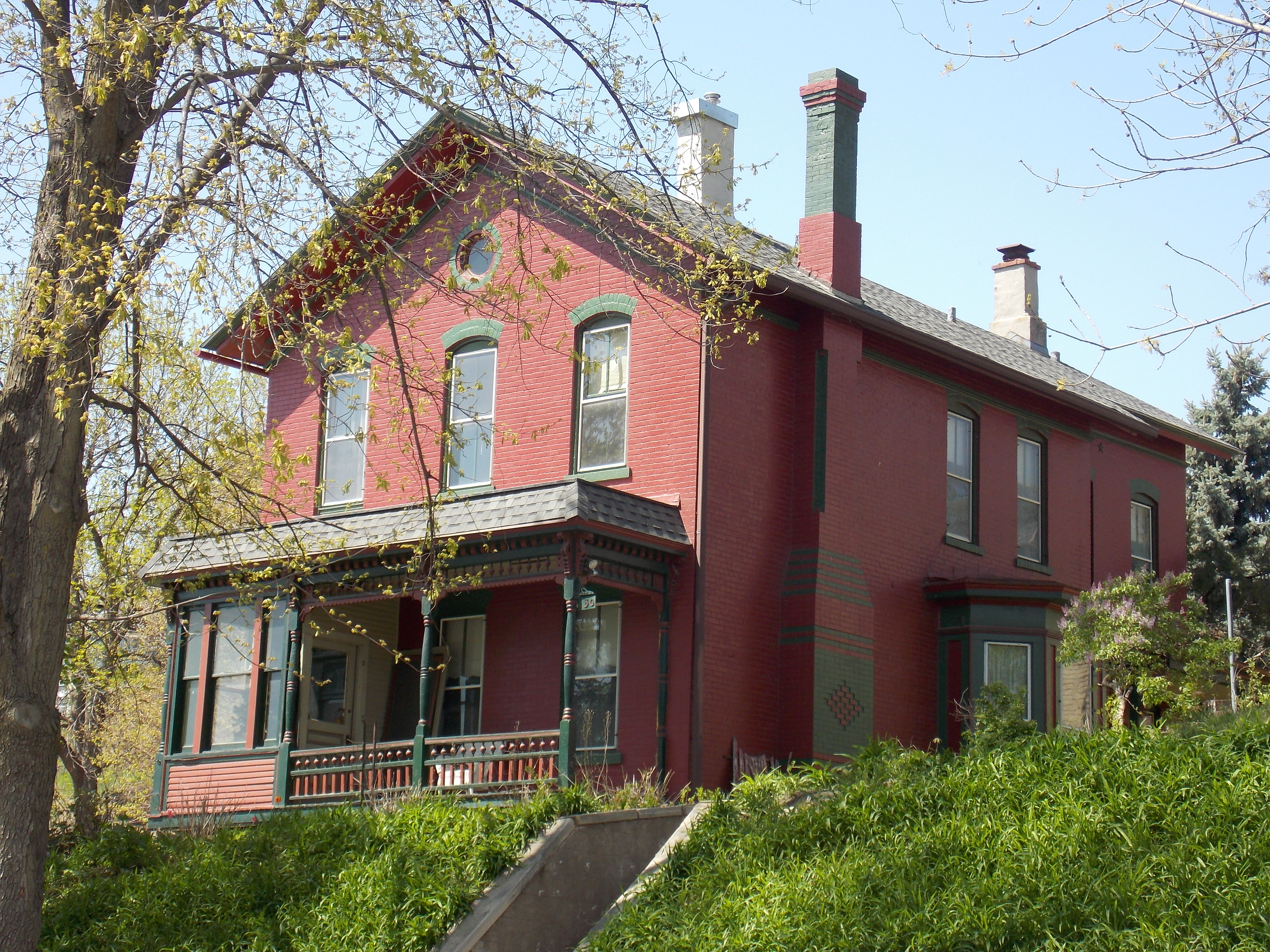
Frederick G. Clausen House on West Sixth Street

F. G. Clausen was born in Eckernförde, Schleswig, Denmark, on 13 February 1848. His official name in Eckernförde was: Fritz Georg Martin Clausen. He emigrated to the U.S. in 1869, but put his emigration request in Germany (Kreis Eckernförde) until 1871.

He was a Fellow of the Western Association of Architects (WAA) from 1885 to 1889. Following the incorporation of WAA into the American Institute of Architects (AIA) in 1889, he became a Member of AIA, continuing that membership until his retirement in 1914.

In addition to his architecture practice, Clausen was an alderman of the city of Davenport, and was instrumental in setting up the Davenport paid fire department in 1882, with three new fire appliances.

== Company history ==
After his arrival in America, Clausen initially worked as a draftsman for Thomas W. McClelland a local architect of some note. He opened his own firm - F.G. Clausen - in Davenport in 1871, working alone until 1896, and then partnered with Parke Burrows until 1904. When Burrows left, Clausen's son Rudolph J. Clausen, joined the company, which then became known as Clausen & Clausen.

Clausen retired in 1914, and his son continued in business as Clausen & Kruse with Walter O. "Stub" Kruse; and from 1925 with Carrol Klein as the head of interior design, forming Clausen, Kruse & Klein.

== Notable buildings ==
=== 1871-1896 (F.G. Clausen) ===
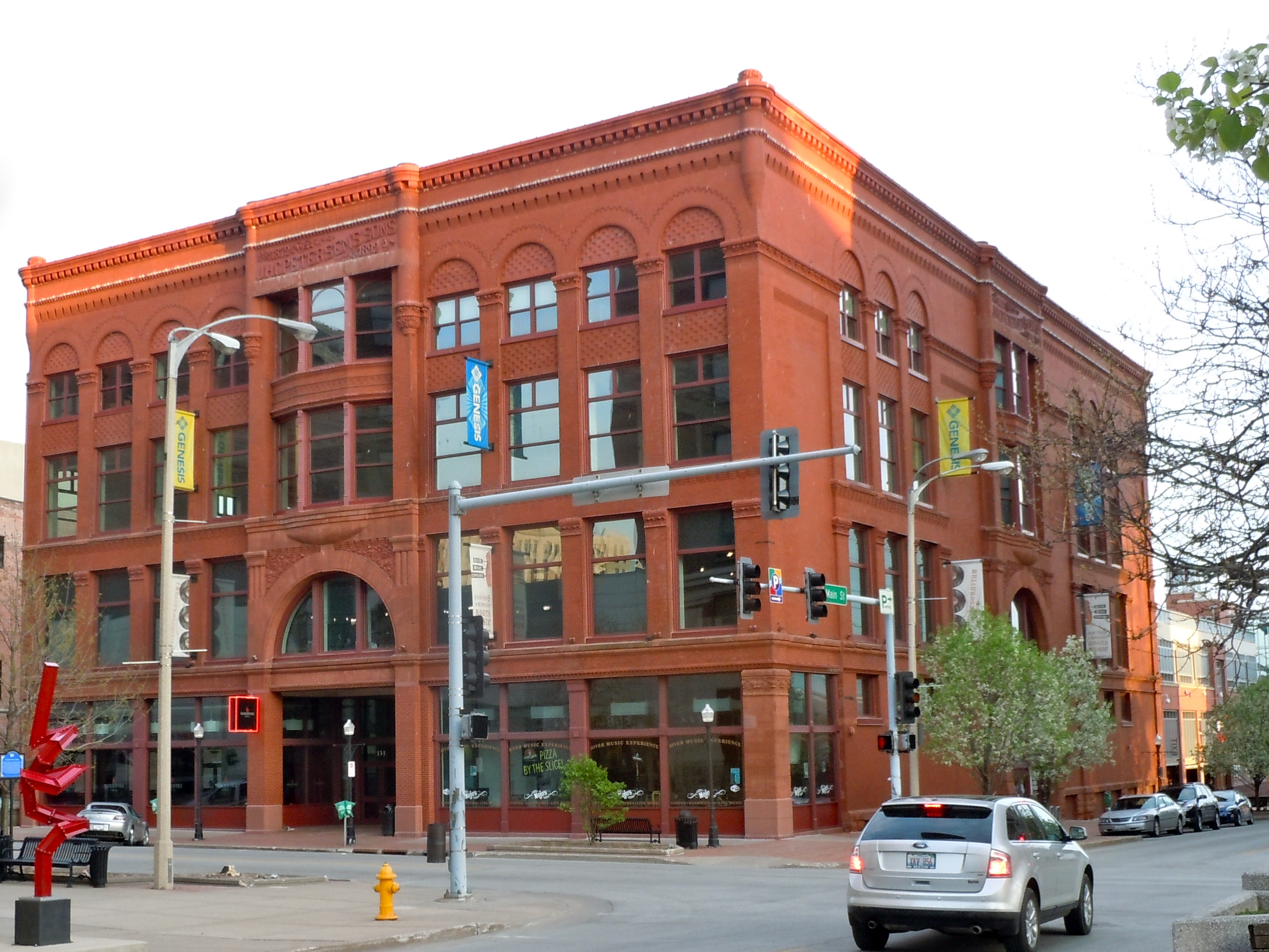
J.H.C. Petersen's Sons' Store

- Davenport Crematorium, 3902 Rockingham Rd. Davenport, IA (1891) NRHP-listed
- The Forrest Block, 401 Brady St. Davenport, IA (1875) NRHP-listed
- Hibernia Hall, 421 Brady St, Davenport, IA (1891) NRHP-listed
- Henry Lischer House, 624 W. 6th St., Davenport, IA (1871) Italianate style design, built for the publisher of Der Demokrat and vice president of the German Savings Bank. Contributing property in the Hamburg Historic District
- Dr. George McLelland Middleton House and Garage, 1221 Scott St. Davenport, IA (1903) NRHP-listed
- Christian and Elfrieda Mueller home, 530 Ripley St. Davenport, IA (c. 1885) Designed by Clausen and built for a local dry goods merchant as an anniversary present for his wife. Contributing property in the Hamburg Historic District
- Northwest Davenport Turner Society Hall, 1602 Washington St. Davenport, IA (1882) NRHP-listed
- J.H.C. Petersen's Sons' Store, 123-131 W. 2nd St. Davenport, IA (1892) NRHP-listed
- Max Petersen House, 1607 W. 12th St. Davenport, IA (1888) NRHP-listed
- School Number 6, 1420 W. 16th St. Davenport, IA (1893, 1902) NRHP-listed
- Scott County Jail, 428 Ripley St. Davenport, IA (1897) NRHP-listed

=== 1896-1904 (Clausen & Burrows) ===
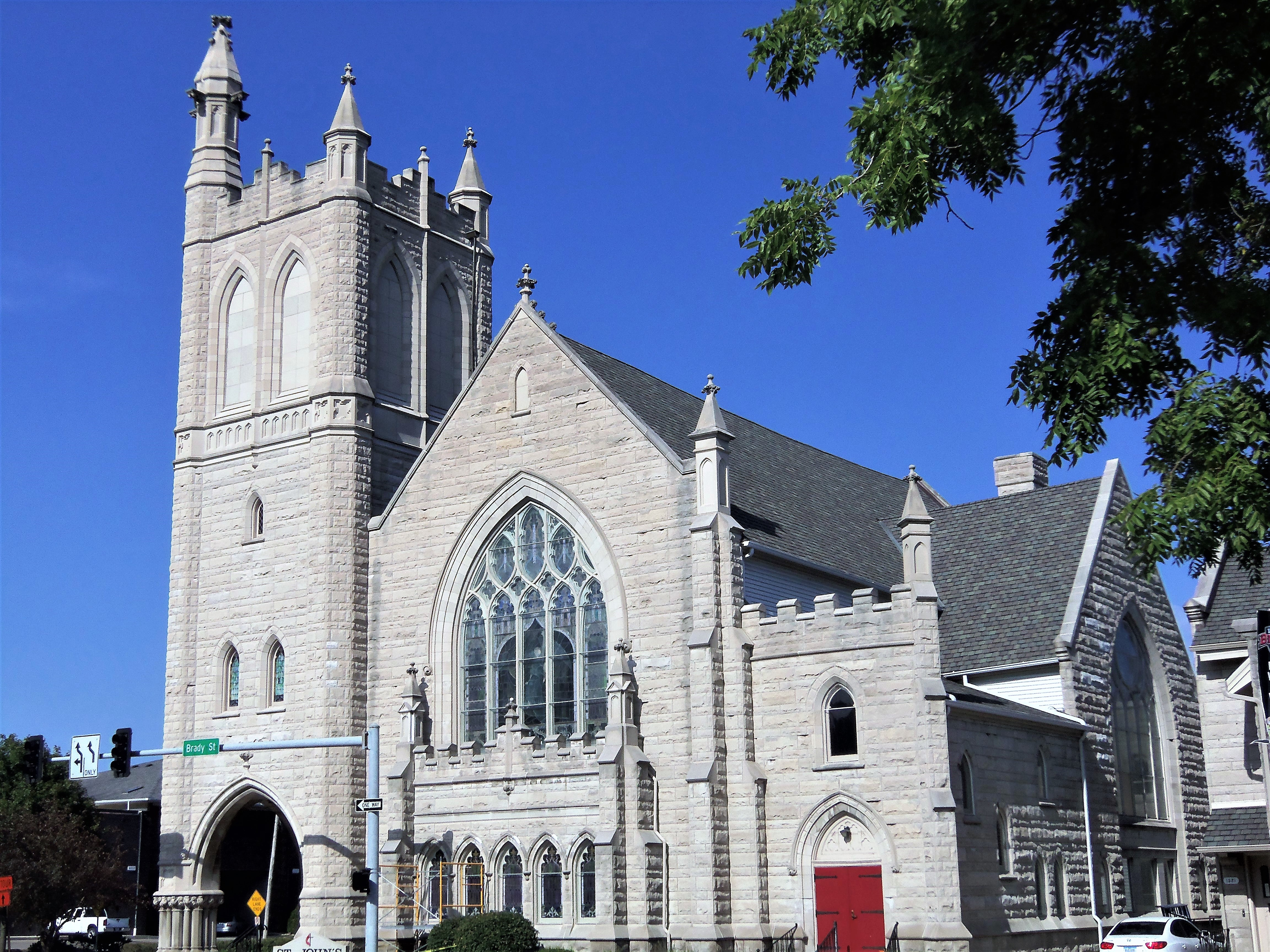
St. John's United Methodist Church

- Argyle Flats, 732 Brady St. Davenport, IA (1900) NRHP-listed
- Buchanan School, 2104 W. 6th St. Davenport, IA, NRHP-listed
- Davenport Central High School, 1120 Main St, Davenport, IA, NRHP-contributing property
- Saengerfest Halle, 1012 W. 4th St. Davenport, IA, NRHP-listed
- St. John's United Methodist Church, 1325-1329 Brady St. Davenport, IA, NRHP-listed
- Buildings in the St. Mary's Roman Catholic Church Complex, 516, 519, 522, and 525 Fillmore St. Davenport, IA, NRHP-listed
- Renwick Building, 324 Brady St. Davenport, IA, NRHP-listed
- Taylor School, 1400 Warren St. Davenport, IA, NRHP-listed
- Robert Wagner House, 904 23rd St., Rock Island, IL, NRHP-listed

=== 1904-1914 (Clausen & Clausen) ===
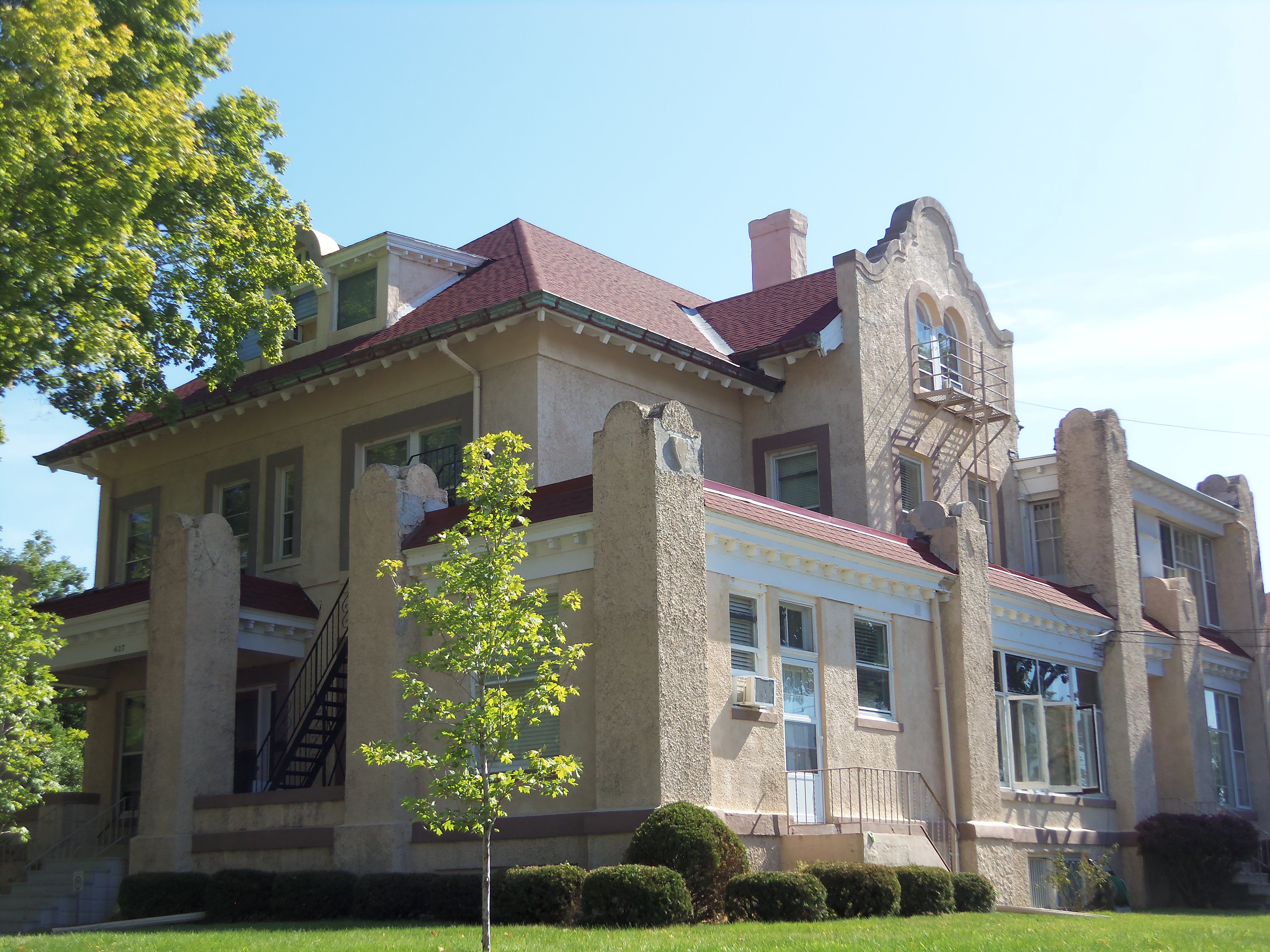
Louis P. and Clara K. Best House

- Best Building, 1701–1703 2nd Ave. Rock Island, IL (1908) NRHP-listed
- Louis P. and Clara K. Best Residence and Auto House, 627 Ripley St. Davenport, IA (1910) NRHP-listed
- Bethel AME Church, 325 W. 11th St. Davenport, IA (1909) NRHP-listed
- Smith Wildman and Jennie (Hearne) Brookhart House, 1203 East Washington Washington, IA (1910) NRHP-listed
- Central Office Building, 230 W. 3rd St. Davenport, IA (1904 & 1906) NRHP-listed
- First Church of Christ, Scientist, 636 Kirkwood Blvd. Davenport, IA (1912) NRHP-listed
- Hillside, 1 Prospect Dr. Davenport, IA (1906) NRHP-listed
- J.H.C. Petersen's Sons' Wholesale Building, 122-124 W. River Dr. Davenport, IA (1910) NRHP-listed
- One or more houses in the Riverview Terrace Historic District, Roughly Riverview Terrace, Clay and Marquette Streets, Davenport, IA NRHP-listed
- Schick's Express and Transfer Co., 118-120 W. River Dr. Davenport, IA (1905) NRHP-listed
- John Schricker House, 5418 Chapel Hill Rd. Davenport, IA (1910) NRHP-listed

=== Post 1914 ===
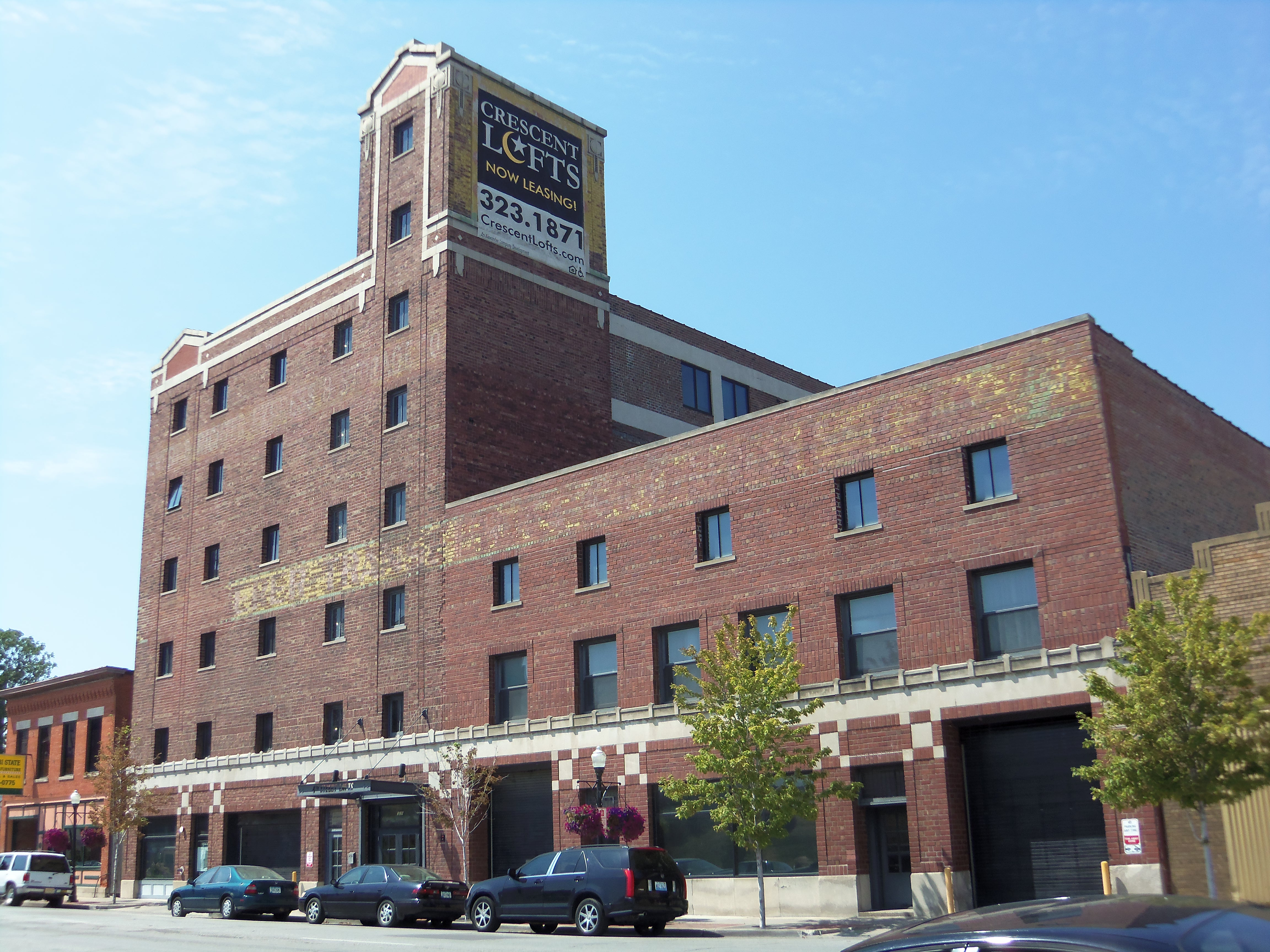
Ewert and Richter Express and Storage Co. warehouses in the Crescent Warehouse Historic District

These buildings were designed by Rudolph J. Clausen after Frederick's retirement:

- One or more buildings in the Crescent Warehouse Historic District, portions of E. 4th St., E. 5th St., Iowa St. and Pershing Ave. Davenport, IA (Clausen & Kruse), NRHP-listed
- One or more buildings in the Davenport Motor Row and Industrial Historic District, River Dr., 2nd & 3rd Sts. between Perry & Iowa Sts. Davenport, IA (Clausen & Kruse), NRHP-listed
- Dr. Kuno Struck House, 1645 W. 12th St. Davenport, IA (1911; Clausen & Kruse), NRHP-listed
- Building at 202 W. Third Street, Davenport, IA (1916; Clausen & Kruse), NRHP-listed
- Democrat Building, 407-411 Brady St. Davenport, IA (1923: Rudolph J. Clausen), NRHP-listed
- Lend-A-Hand Club, 105 Main St. Davenport, IA (1922; Frederick G. Clausen), NRHP-listed
- The Linograph Company Building, 420 W. River Dr. Davenport, IA (1919; Clausen & Kruse), NRHP-listed
- An addition to the Northwest Davenport Turner Society Hall, 1602 Washington St. Davenport, IA (Clausen, Kruse & Klein), NRHP-listed
- W.D. Petersen Memorial Music Pavilion, LeClaire Park, Davenport, IA (1924; Rudolph J. Clausen), NRHP-listed
- W.D. Petersen mausoleum, Oakdale Memorial Gardens, Davenport, IA (1921; Clausen & Kruse), contributing building in Oakdale Cemetery Historic District, NRHP-listed
- Rockford Morning Star Building, 127 N. Wyman St. Rockford, IL (1927; Clausen, Kruse & Klein), NRHP-listed
- Municipal Inn, LeClaire Park, Davenport, IA (1929; Clausen, Kruse & Klein), Davenport Register of Historic Properties
- Royal Neighbors of America National Home, 4760 Rockingham Rd. Davenport, IA (1931; Clausen, Kruse and Klein), NRHP-listed
