= Building at 202 W. Third Street =

Historic place in Iowa, United States

- U.S. National Register of Historic Places
- U.S. Historic district – Contributing property
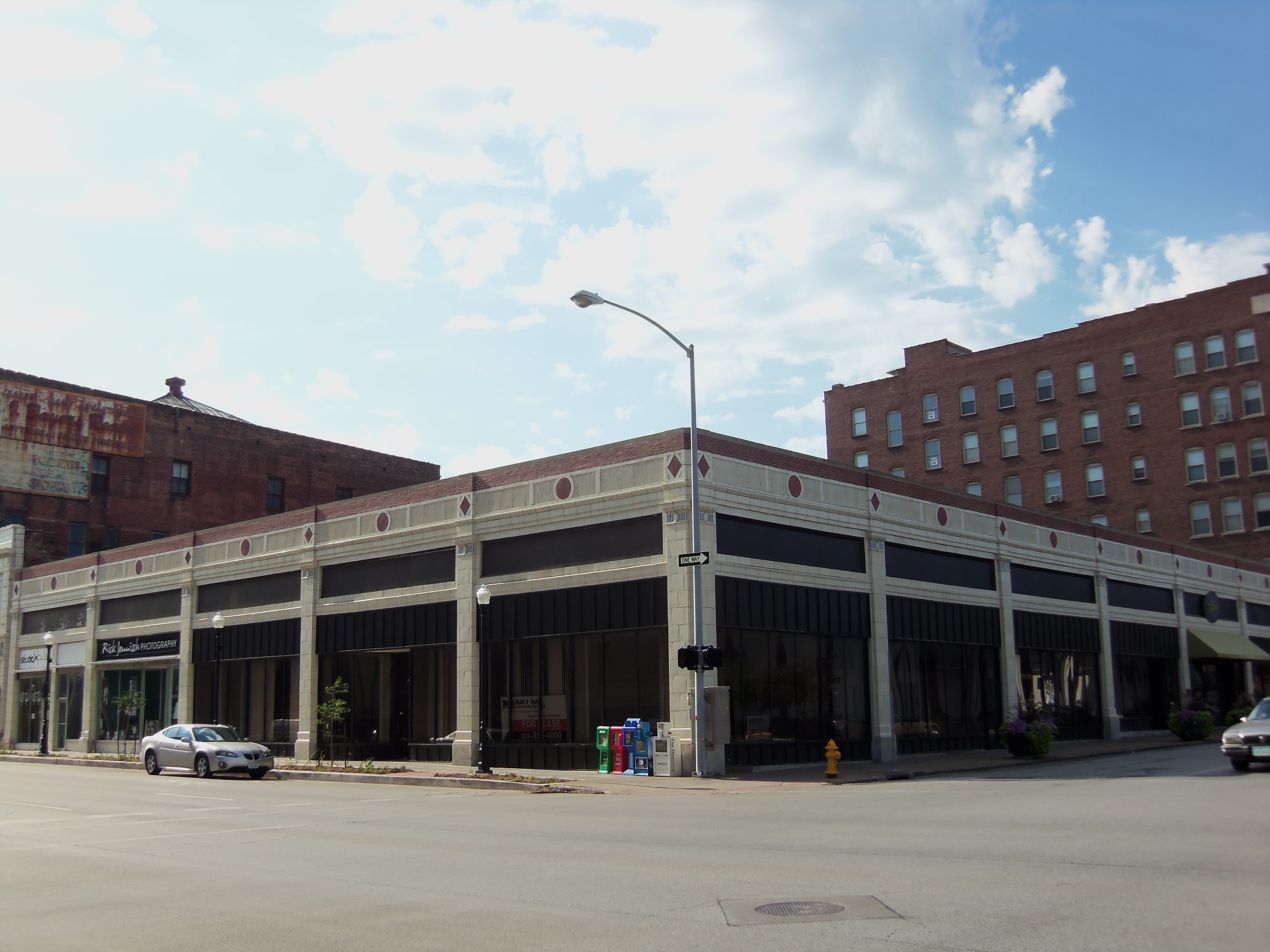

- Location within Iowa Location within the United States
- Location: 202 W. 3rd St. Davenport, Iowa
- Coordinates: 41°31′21″N 90°34′33″W
- Area: less than one acre
- Built: 1916
- Architect: Clausen & Kruse
- Architectural style: Classical Revival
- Part of: Davenport Downtown Commercial Historic District (ID100005546)
- MPS: Davenport MRA
- NRHP reference No.: 83001318
- Added to NRHP: July 7, 1983

The Building at 202 W. Third Street, also known as the M.D. Petersen Estate Building, is a historic building located in downtown Davenport, Iowa, United States. It has been individually listed on the National Register of Historic Places since 1983. In 2020 it was included as a contributing property in the Davenport Downtown Commercial Historic District.

== History ==
The building was built in 1916 and designed by the local architectural firm Clausen & Kruse. Prior to this building, the site was occupied by T.W. McClelland Company, which manufactured doors, sashes, and blinds. Businesses that have occupied this building include The Mecca Café and the Colorado Café, multiple cigar retailers including Main Cigar and the United Cigar Stores Co., offices of the Quad City Steamwheelers organization, law offices, Blu Clothing, and the Eastern Iowa Center for Problem Gambling. Other types of commercial enterprises that were housed here include a shoe shop, optical shop, and a candy business. The building was renovated in 2013 and in November, Me & Billy Kitchen and Bar was opened.

== Architecture ==
The building is a one-story structure on the corner of West Third and Main Streets that was designed to accommodate several businesses at the same time. It has a steel structure that is covered in terra cotta. There are indications that the building was designed to be a multi-story structure with as many as ten floors. The building is divided into five bays on the Third Street elevation and six on Main Street. Each elevation is dominated by large display windows. The steel structure, which was just becoming popular at the time, makes these large openings possible. The pilasters mounted on stone pedestals topped with an egg and dart motif suggests the Classical. It becomes more stylized in the cornice, which is highlighted by terra cotta discs and diamonds. The bottom edge of the storefronts also features mosaic tiles.
