= Dillon Memorial =

- U.S. National Register of Historic Places
- Davenport Register of Historic Properties
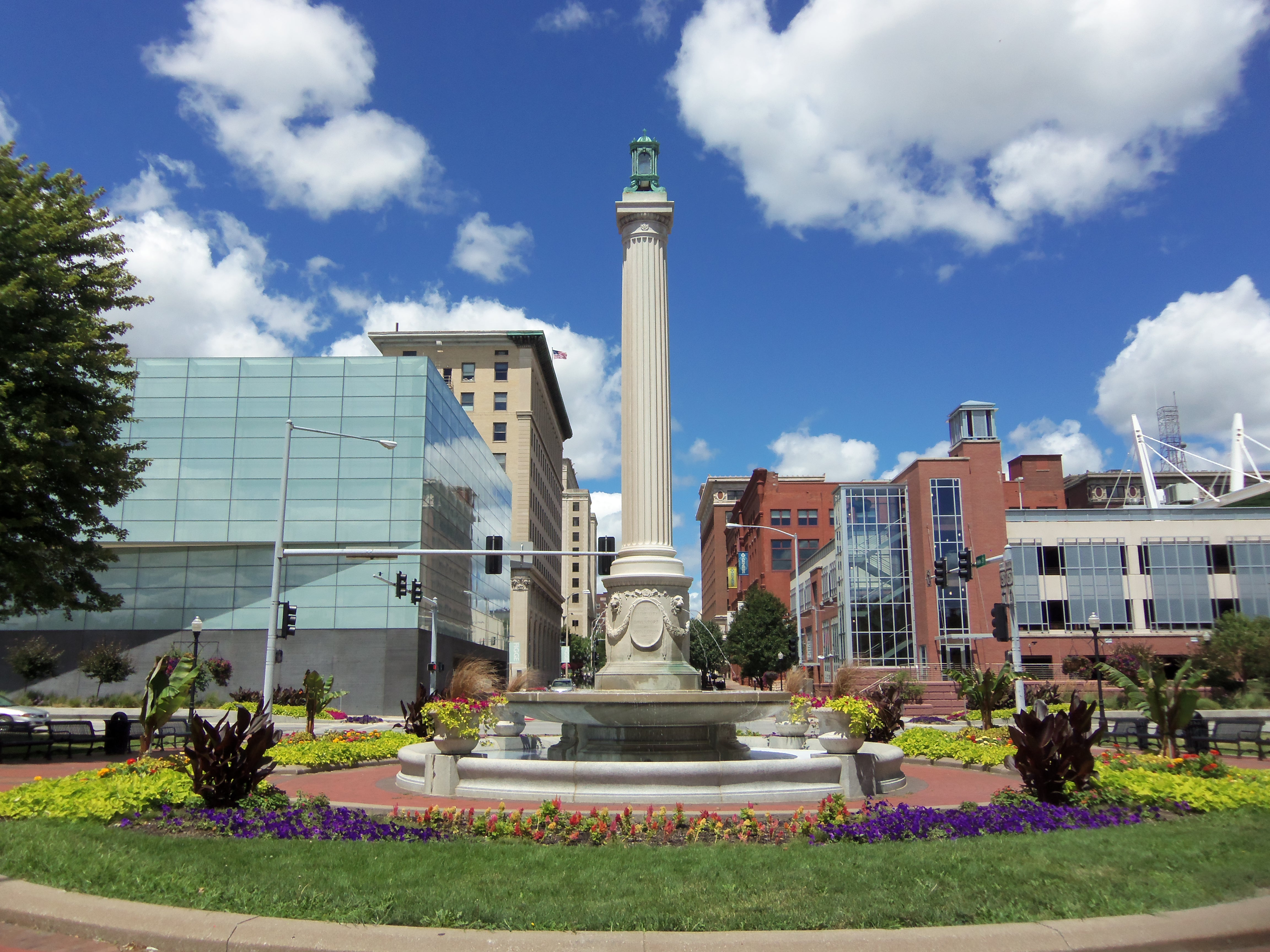

- Location within Iowa Location within the United States
- Location: S. Main St. Davenport, Iowa
- Coordinates: 41°31′12″N 90°34′32″W
- Area: less than one acre
- Built: 1918-1919
- Architect: Franklin & Arthur Ware, Paul Schultz
- Architectural style: Classical Revival
- MPS: Davenport MRA
- NRHP reference No.: 83002421
- DRHP No.: 10

Significant dates
- Added to NRHP: July 7, 1983
- Designated DRHP: June 2, 1993

The Dillon Memorial is a historic structure located in LeClaire Park, near downtown Davenport, Iowa, United States. It was listed on the National Register of Historic Places (NRHP) in 1983 and on the Davenport Register of Historic Properties in 1993. It is commonly referred to as the Dillon Fountain.

== History ==
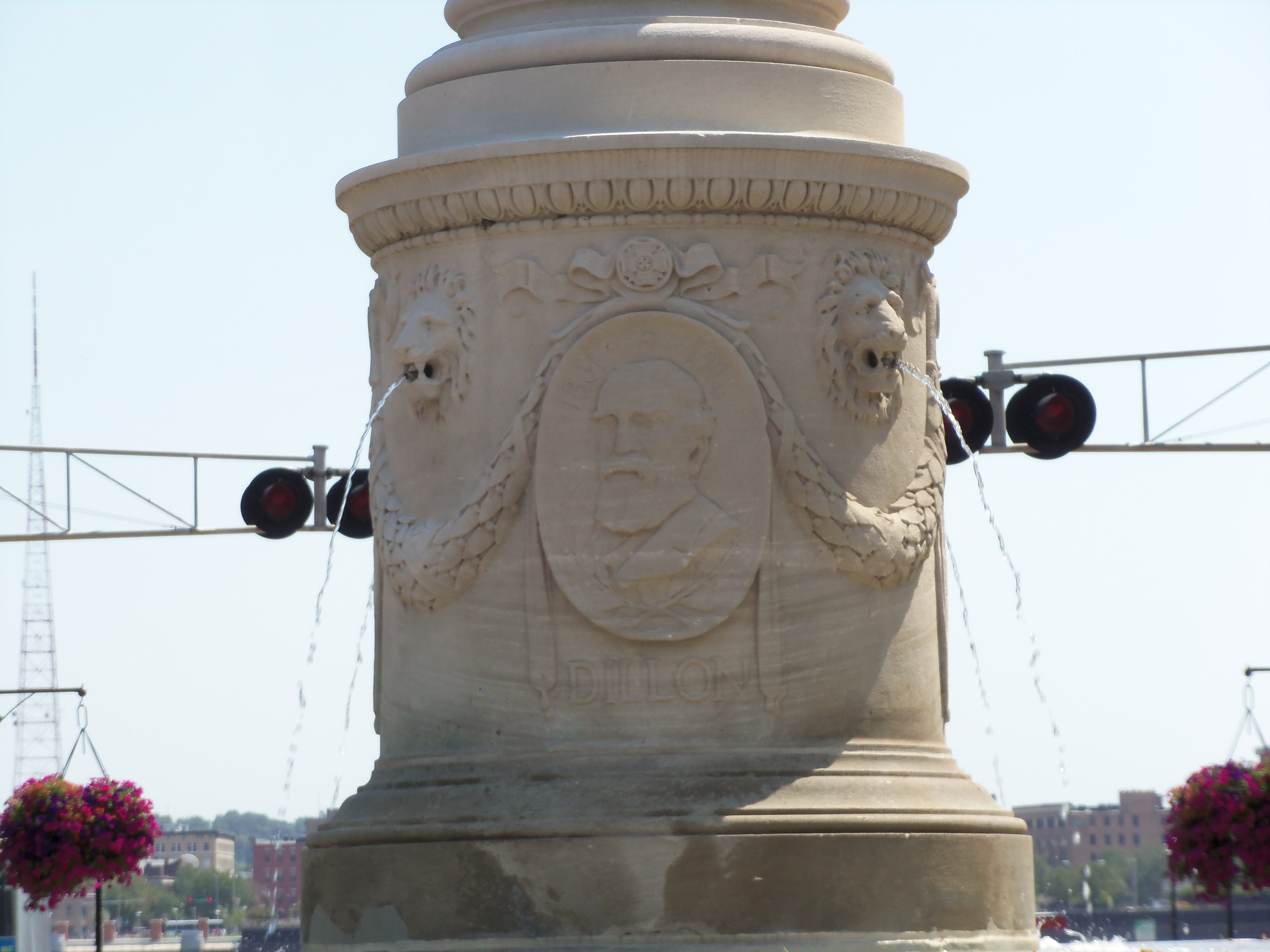
Dillon bas-relief

The structure memorializes John Forrest Dillon who was a Davenport attorney, an Iowa Supreme Court Justice and a judge on the United States Circuit Court. A bequest after his death on May 6, 1914, specified the construction and location of the fountain. The memorial anchors the south end of Main Street and faces the Civil War Monument twelve blocks to the north on top of the bluff. It was also meant to be a focal point and dramatic terminus for the street, which connects LeClaire Park with Vander Veer Park in central Davenport.

Like the Civil War Monument, Main Street surrounded the Dillon Memorial. When the memorial was constructed from 1918 to 1919 there were no other structures on the south side of River Drive. The memorial was part of a major riverfront development program by the Levee Improvement Commission along with Union Station and the W.D. Petersen Memorial Music Pavilion. It was at this time that the name of Riverfront Park was changed to LeClaire Park. In 1922 the Municipal Natatorium was built on the west side of the street from the memorial, and a year later the Lend-A-Hand Club was built to the east. The Lend-a-Hand building was also listed on the NRHP. In the late 20th century the memorial returned to its original state when the other two structures were torn down. Main Street was then closed south of River Drive and the area was incorporated into LeClaire Park in 1997. At that time the brick plaza was built around the fountain.

== Architecture ==
The Davenport Levee Improvement Commission sponsored a design competition for the memorial. New York artists Franklin and Arthur Ware won the competition and designed the memorial in association with Paul Schultz. The Dillon Memorial is a Neoclassical structure built in Bedford, Indiana limestone. The style is typical of monuments and public buildings that were built at the time. It also reflected Arthur Ware's training at the Ecole des Beaux-Arts in Paris.

The monument is an upright, fluted column surrounded by a circular basin, which functions as a fountain. A lantern sits on top of a platform capital. Bas-relief panels of lion heads and garland swags decorate the base of the column. There is also a bas-relief likeness of Judge Dillon on the column.
