= Buchanan School =

- U.S. National Register of Historic Places
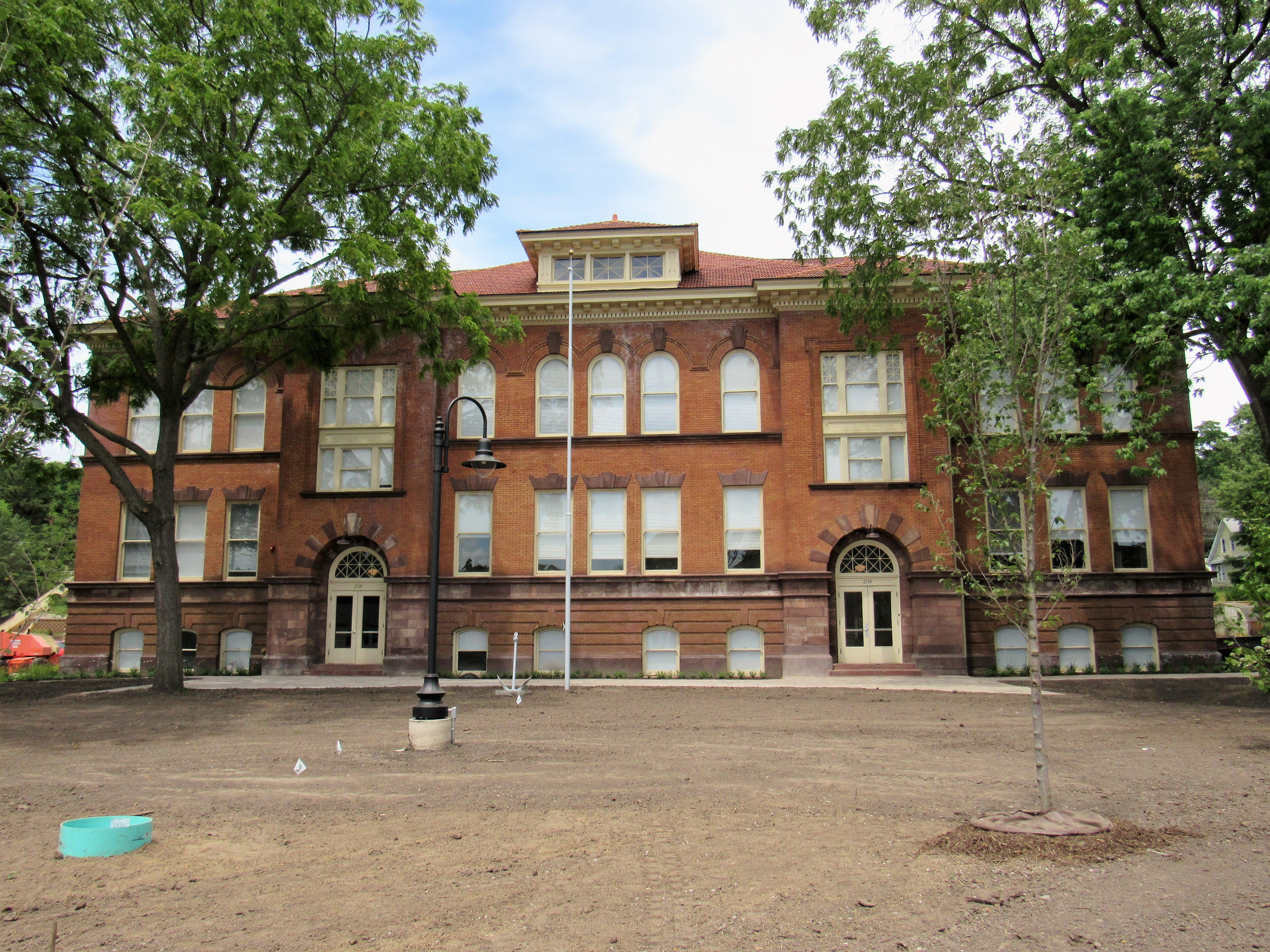
- The building as renovations were nearing completion in July 2019.

- Location within Iowa Location within the United States
- Location: 2104 W. 6th St. Davenport, Iowa
- Coordinates: 41°31′34″N 90°36′31″W
- Area: 1 acre (0.40 ha)
- Built: 1904
- Architect: Clausen & Burrows
- Architectural style: Colonial Revival
- MPS: Davenport MRA
- NRHP reference No.: 83002406
- Added to NRHP: July 7, 1983

Buchanan School, also known as The Naval Station, is a historic building located in the West End of Davenport, Iowa, United States. It was listed on the National Register of Historic Places in 1983. Since 2019 the building has housed a senior living apartment building.

== History ==
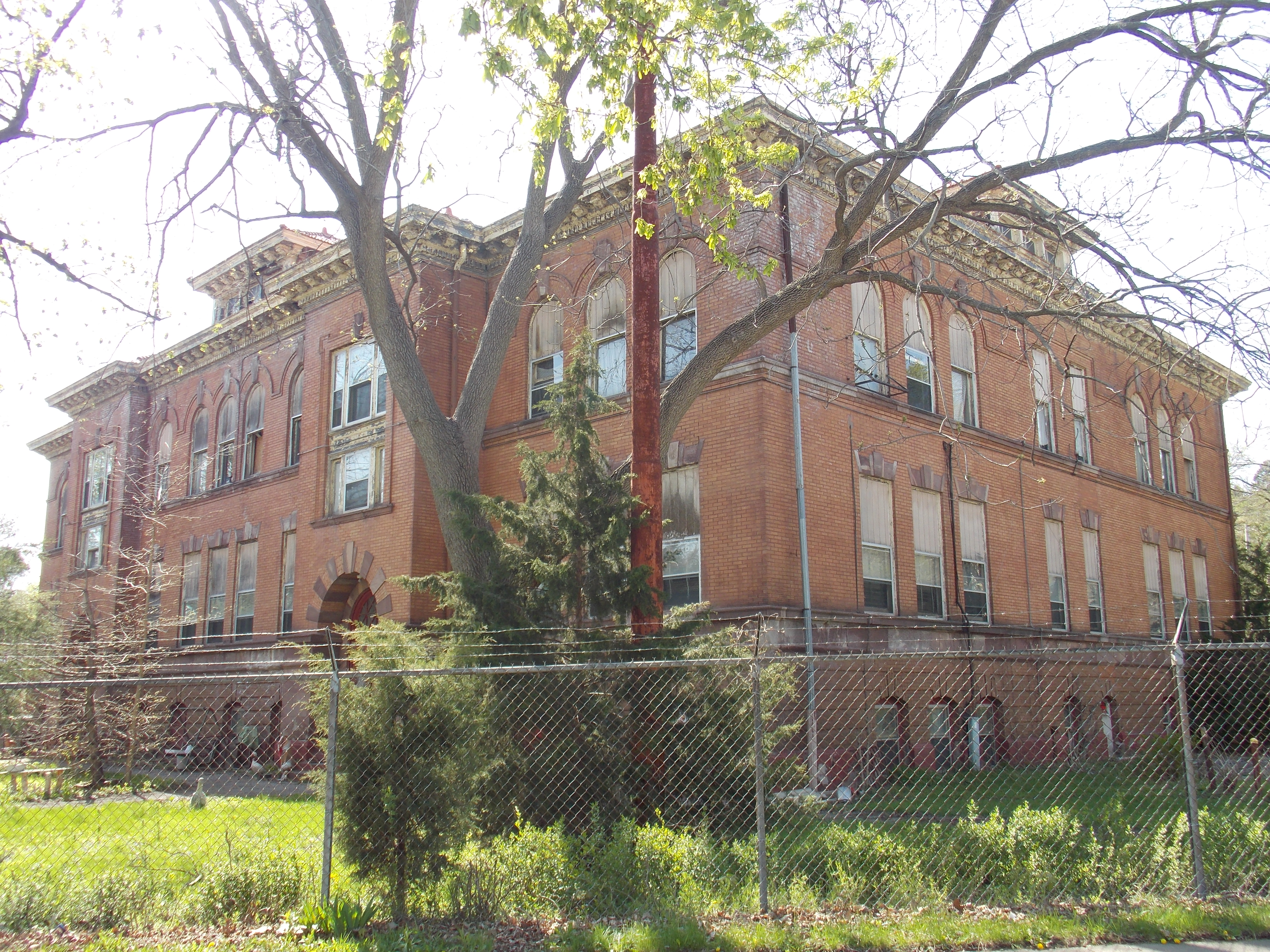
The building before it was renovated into apartments.

Buchanan School was built as School #14 in 1904 when J. B. Young was superintendent. It was one of eight elementary schools that were opened during his 30-year administration. Its name was changed to Buchanan four years after it opened. When the "6-3-3" system was adopted by Davenport schools around 1919 Buchanan continued serving its west end neighborhood as an elementary school. It continued in that capacity until 1940. The building sat vacant until 1951 when it was converted for use as a U.S. Naval Training Center. They continued to use the building until 1978 when it sat vacant again. In 1988 it was used for storage for an antique auto parts business. The building has subsequently been vacated again and has deteriorated.

In 2014 a proposal was announced to convert the former school building into 18 senior apartments, but funding fell through. By the time financing was secured the building was in a serious state of decline. The roof and the west wall, which were caving in, had to be stabilized. In the renovation process, all of the exterior's original decorative features were kept and repaired. The red clay roof tiles, bricks, and stonework that had deteriorated were replaced. On the interior, the original central staircase, classroom doors, and the open areas in the center of the second and third floors were all retained. The nearly $9 million renovation project, which was about twice the original estimate in 2014, was completed in the summer of 2019. The building, now known as The Naval Station, houses 18 senior living apartments with six units on each floor.

== Architecture ==
The school building was designed by the Davenport architectural firm of Clausen & Burrows. It sits on a full city block that is irregularly shaped by the intersection of the city street grid and Telegraph Road that follows the lower line of the river bluffs at this point. The building's design combines the Colonial Revival and Renaissance Revival styles. The rectangular structure is two stories high on a raised basement. It is built entirely with yellow bricks, however, the bricks on the lower level are laid in such a way as to suggest stone. The building features a hipped roof with bracketed eaves. The south elevation of the building has two entrances framed by round arches. The building has three different window styles. There are segmented windows on the basement level, rectangular windows on the main floor, and round arch windows on the second floor.
