= Northwest Davenport Turner Society Hall =

- Northwest Davenport; Turner Society Hall
- U.S. National Register of Historic Places
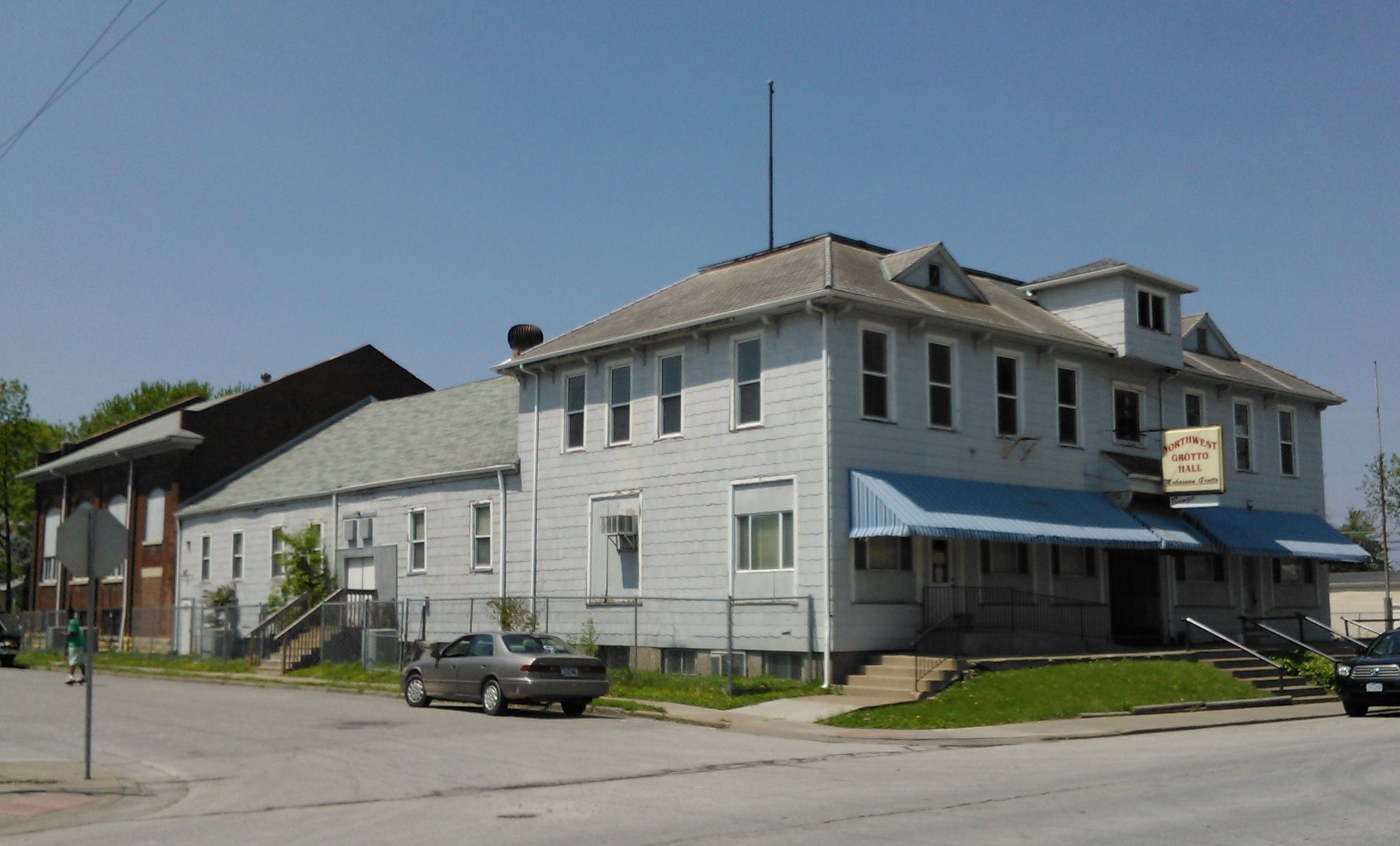
- Northwest Turner Hall in 2012

- Location within Iowa Location within the United States
- Location: 1602 Washington St. Davenport, Iowa
- Coordinates: 41°32′9″N 90°35′47″W
- Area: 1 acre (0.40 ha)
- Built: 1882, 1904, 1926
- Architect: Frederick G. Clausen; Rudolph J. Clausen
- NRHP reference No.: 79000941
- Added to NRHP: July 10, 1979

The Northwest Davenport Turner Society Hall is a historic building located in the old northwest side of Davenport, Iowa, United States. It has been listed on the National Register of Historic Places since 1979. The Northwest Davenport Turner Society Hall is significant for its association with Davenport's German community, which was the city's largest and most influential immigrant group. It also played an important role in the civic and cultural life of the northwest Davenport German community.

== History ==
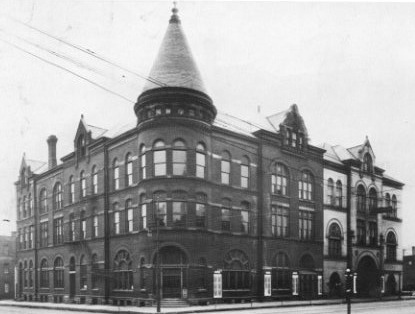
Central Turner Hall (1888) SW corner of Third & Scott Streets

=== Turners ===
Friedrich Ludwig Jahn (1778–1852) was a teacher in Berlin who started outdoor physical education classes in 1811. His twin goals were to promote physical fitness and German nationalism. Over the next three decades gymnastic societies known as Turnvereins opened in many German cities. Their members were known as “Turners”, the German word for gymnasts. The societies also served as gathering places for people who desired democratic reforms in the governments of the various German states. They supported the revolution that began in 1848 and when it failed they fled to the United States, and many came to Davenport.

=== The Turners in Davenport ===
Among those who came to Davenport were Theodor Gülich and Christian Müller, and their arrival led to the foundation of the Turner society in the city in 1852. Gülich's father and grandfather were active in the Schleswig-Holstein movement prior to the rebellion. He stated in 1854 at the Turner's first large public event that the local society would fight against nativism and the domination of the church. It would also work to promote freedom, education and well-being for all people. The early Turner's in Davenport took a progressive stand on social issues such as women's rights. They were also promoters of the German Free School Society in Davenport. Many of the early members also had a desire to return to the German states to continue the revolutionary struggle. Initially, the local Turner society was called the Sozialistischer Turnverein (Socialistic Turner Society). While they were harsh critics of American society, they strove to be good Americans. They expected any potential member to become an American citizen before joining. They also participated in the annual Fourth of July celebrations. At the centennial celebration in 1876, however, they stayed true to their anticlerical convictions and left the procession when a prayer was added to the festivities. As time went on, however, their radical attitudes subsided and they gradually abandoned their hopes of returning to Germany. In 1858 the organization changed its name to the Davenporter Turnverein and in 1882 it was changed to the Davenporter Turngemeinde. With the second wave of German immigration in the 1870s, the number of Turner societies in Davenport grew from one to three.

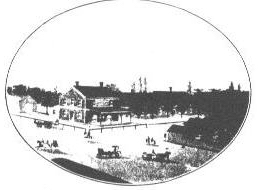
The original Northwest Turner building that was destroyed in a fire.

=== Northwest Turners ===
The Northwest Davenport Turner Society was established in 1871 and their first meeting place was Jacobsen's Hall at Locust and Division Streets, which was a combination boarding house and tavern. It was destroyed in a fire on July 4, 1882, and a new building was constructed soon after at 16th and Washington Streets. The Turner Hall continued to serve the physical and mental exercise of its members. Folk festivals were also held in an adjoining garden. The society continued to expand as did German immigration to the city. In 1904 the Turners expanded their hall and they hired Davenport architect Frederick G. Clausen, himself a Schleswig-Holstein native. It was renovated yet again in 1926 and it was the work of Clausen's son Rudolph, who continued his father's firm under the name of Clausen, Kruse and Klein.

Both the East and Northwest Turners continued to function in Davenport until at least the 1980s. The Northwest Davenport Turner Society sold their building in 1991 and it became Uncle Roscoe's Polo Club. In 1994 it was sold to the Mohassan Grotto, a Masonic organization. They used the building for bingo games that the organization used for fundraising. In 2017 Compassion Church acquired the building and uses it as a site for their breakfast ministry, known as Timothy's House of Hope. The Northwest Turners continue to operate, however, they are an organization without a hall. The membership currently meets at a variety of local venues and they sponsor bowling and golf teams.

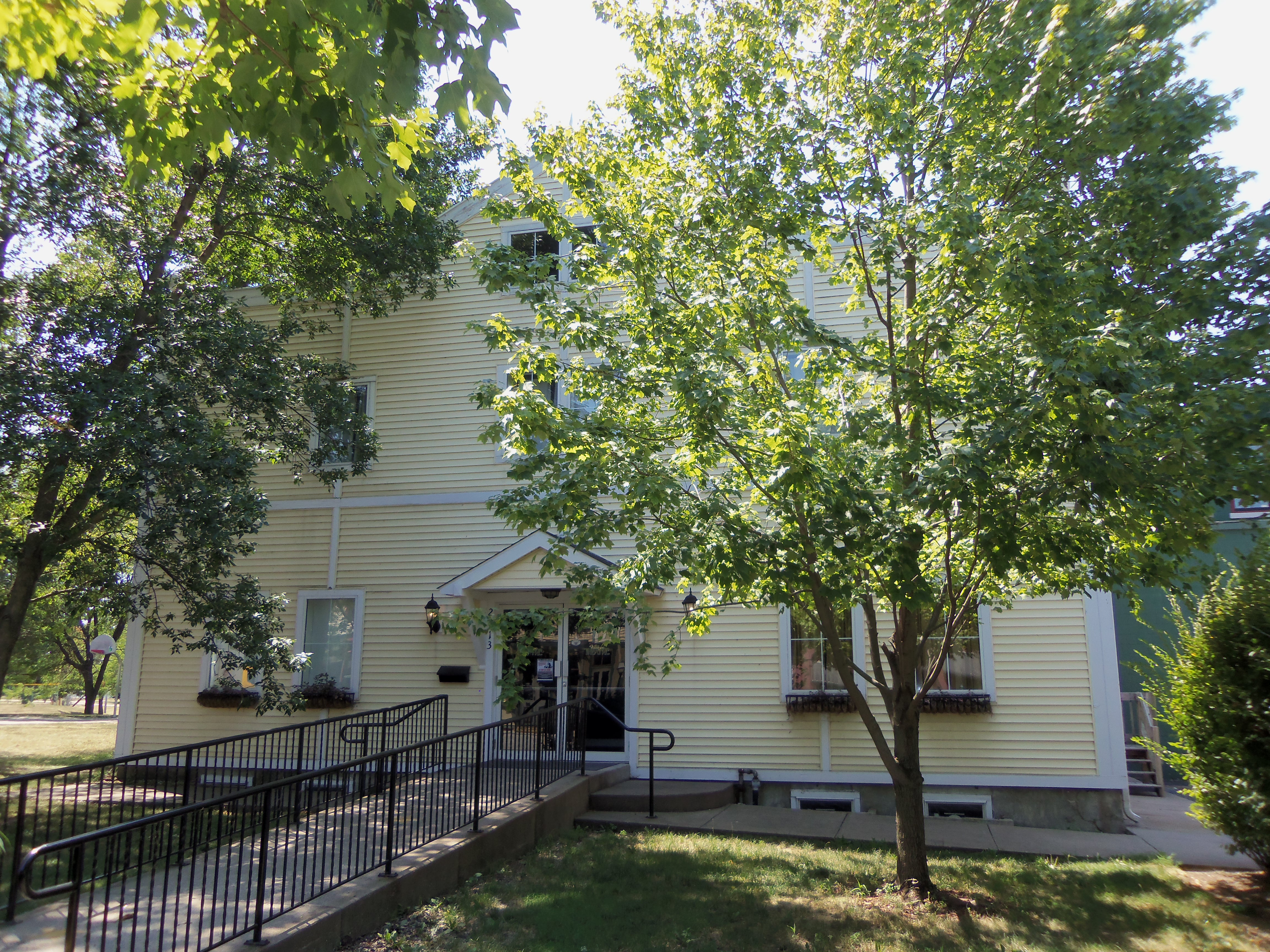
East Davenport Turner Hall

=== Turners in Scott County ===
At one time there were five Turner halls in Scott County. Two of the other halls were in Davenport. The Central Turner Hall was located at 401 W. Third St. near Washington Square on the west side of downtown. Built in 1888, it was the second largest Turner Hall in the United States. The building was damaged in a fire in 1961 and torn down in 1975 to make way for senior citizen housing. The East Turner Hall (1891) continues to stand in the Village of East Davenport and is in use as a theater. The Turner hall in Buffalo (1869) was destroyed in a fire in 1961 and the one in Eldridge (c. 1885) was destroyed in a fire in 2013.

== Architecture ==
The main block of the 1882 building was nearly square in its proportions. It was two stories tall and four bays wide and deep. It was capped with a hipped roof with bracketed eaves, and the roof deck was edged with iron cresting. There was a small gabled dormer centered above the main facade. The main entrance into the facility was located to the right of center and was surrounded by a flat frame that was capped with a shallow, triangular pediment. The gymnasium extended off the back of the main block. Like the main block, it was a frame structure, and it measured 74 feet (23 m) by 48 feet (15 m). Unlike the main block, it was capped with a gable roof.

The 1904 addition added three more bays to the north side of the main block. The original dormer was removed and two small triangular dormers flanked a projecting bay on the second floor. It culminated in a spire with flared eaves. Window treatment on the second floor of the addition matched the original structure. The first-floor windows were triple-storefront windows that flanked a secondary entrance. The main entrance into the facility was placed beneath the projecting bay. The original gymnasium was renovated into a combination movie theater and dance hall. A new gymnasium was attached to the west of the original. It is a brick structure built on a stone foundation and a raised basement. It has a gable roof whose ends culminate in shallow shoulder parapets. The side walls are four bays wide and are divided by flat engaged brick piers and corbelling across the top.

The 1926 renovation saw the alteration of the main facade. The windows on the first floor were enlarged, and plate glass windows replaced the double-hung sashes. The projecting bay over the main entrance and its spire was replaced by a hipped-roof dormer. The iron cresting was removed from the roof deck. A full basement was dug under the wood portion of the building. The front part of the building, which faced Washington Street, became two storefronts. The second floor was converted into an apartment. The main entrance opened into a hallway between the storefronts that lead to the auditorium/dance hall.
