= Argyle Flats =

- U.S. National Register of Historic Places
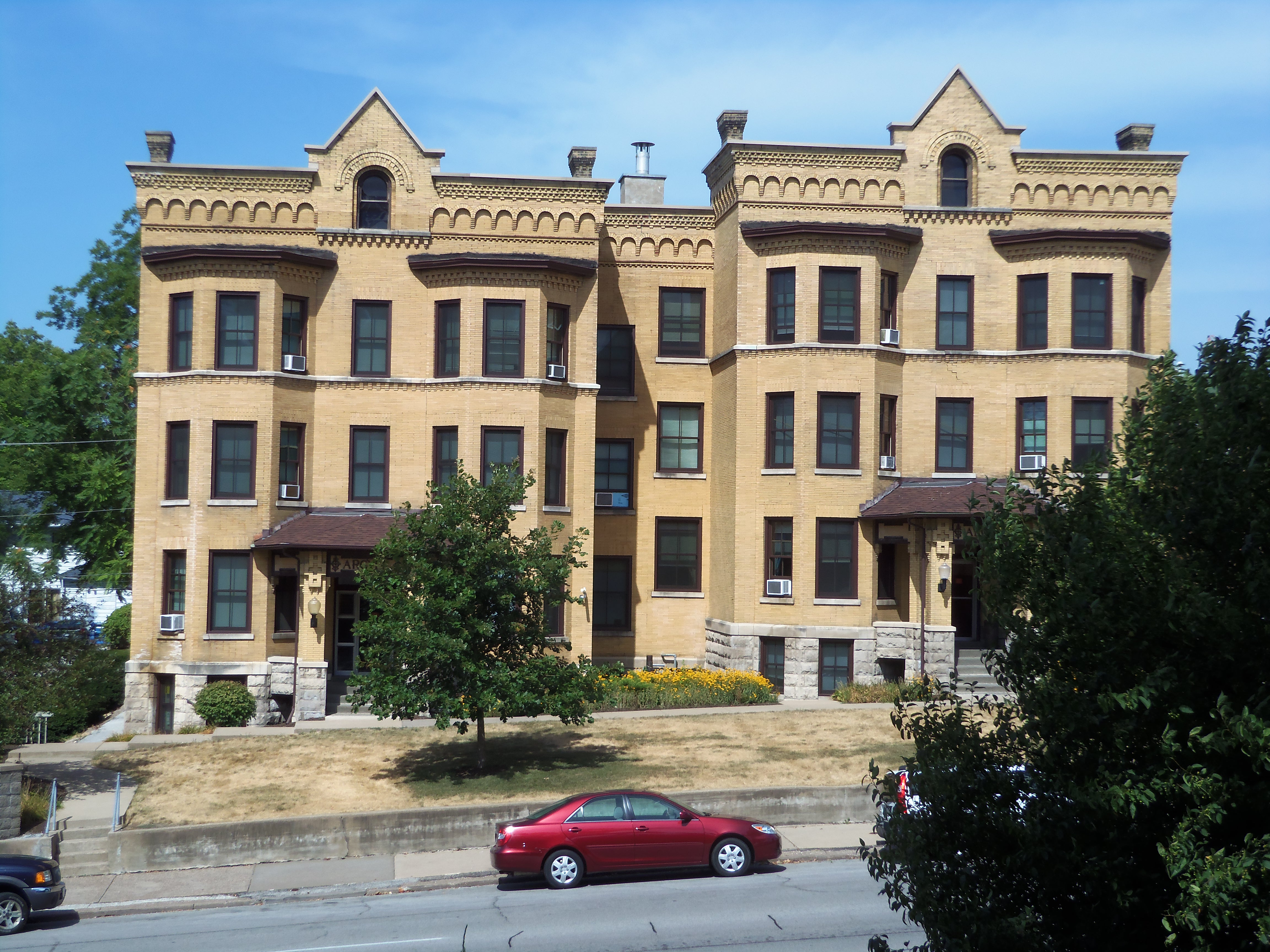
- Argyle Flats in 2012

- Location within Iowa Location within the United States
- Location: 732 Brady St. Davenport, Iowa
- Coordinates: 41°31′39″N 90°34′28″W
- Area: less than 1 acre (0.40 ha)
- Built: 1900
- Architect: Clausen & Burrows
- MPS: Davenport MRA
- NRHP reference No.: 83002397
- Added to NRHP: July 7, 1983

Argyle Flats is a historic building located on a busy thoroughfare in Davenport, Iowa, United States. It was listed on the National Register of Historic Places in 1983.

== History ==
The structure was designed by the Davenport architectural firm of Clausen & Burrows and completed in 1900. It was typical of the apartment blocks that were built in Davenport near the turn of the 20th century. It was advantageously located near the expanding campus of Palmer College of Chiropractic, along a streetcar line and within walking distance of the downtown area. Palmer College now owns the building.

== Architecture ==
Argyle Flats is a three-story structure built on a raised basement. Its basic form is compact and rectilinear. It rises three floors above an exposed basement and features an asymmetrical facade. The smooth brick walls contrast with the rough textures of the cornices that feature Romanesque Revival corbelling and round-arched windows on the attic level in pointed gables that rise above the coping. Decorative details are found at the building's main entrances and on the cornice. The cornice itself continues across the deeply recessed hyphen between the two facades, which minimizes the reality that the building is two separate blocks. Argyle Flats also features full-height, polygonal, projecting window bays. There are two entrances in the main facade that each lead to flats on one side of a bearing or party wall. The exteriors of both sides of the building are a mirror-image of the other, which is typical of the city's double houses. An adjustment is made, however, as the north section of the building sets higher on the hillside than the southern section. Elements of the Victorian era are found in its picturesque facade.

== Sources ==
- Martha H. Bowers (January 1982). "NRHP Multiple Resource Assessment: Historical and Architectural Resources of Davenport". National Park Service. (pages 1-30 of PDF document)
- Martha H. Bowers (July 1983). "NRHP Multiple Resource Assessment: Historical and Architectural Resources of Davenport, Iowa (Part II)". National Park Service. Northwest and north-central Davenport, the Fulton Addition, and McClellan Heights (pages 30-69 of PDF document)
