= Dr. George McLelland Middleton House and Garage =

Historic house in Iowa, US

- U.S. National Register of Historic Places
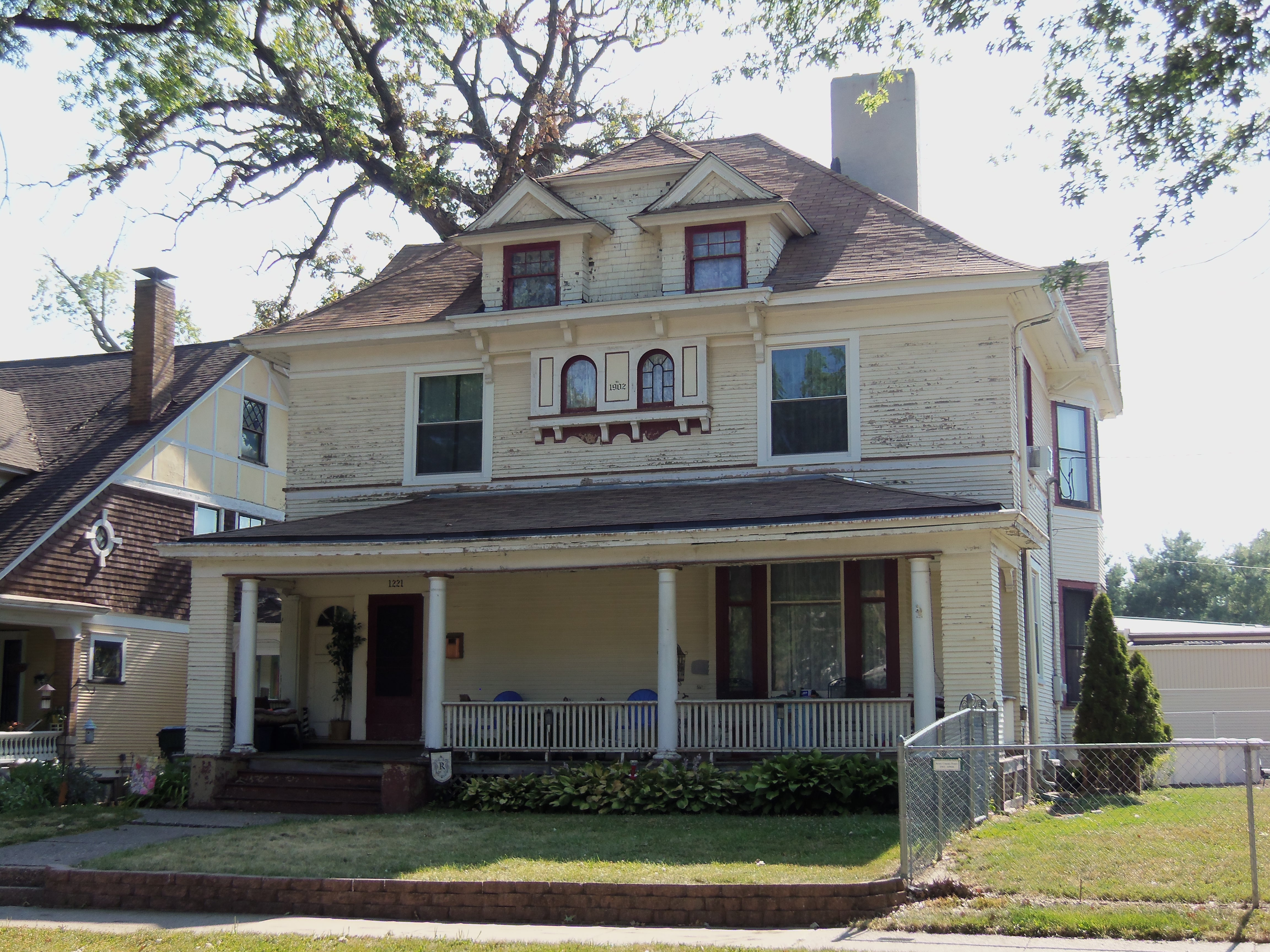

- Location within Iowa Location within the United States
- Location: 1221 Scott St. Davenport, Iowa
- Coordinates: 41°31′57.76″N 90°34′46.66″W
- Area: less than one acre
- Built: 1903
- Architect: Fritz G. Clausen
- Architectural style: Classical Revival
- NRHP reference No.: 82001549
- Added to NRHP: November 10, 1982

The Dr. George McLelland Middleton House and Garage is a historic building located in the central part of Davenport, Iowa, United States. The residence has been listed on the National Register of Historic Places since 1982.

== History ==
Dr. George Middleton was one of three sons, who all became doctors, of Dr. William Middleton who was a founding member of the School of Medicine at the University of Iowa. He was a general practice doctor in Davenport who also worked as a physician for local industry, including the Chicago, Rock Island and Pacific Railroad. Middleton had this house built in 1903 and lived here until 1918 when he and his wife, who had no children, sold the house when he went into the Army Medical Corps during World War I. The house was built on Dr. William Middleton's estate and George did not receive title to the house until 1915. One of his brothers built the house across the alley. Their parent's home, which is no longer extant, was behind the brother's homes. In 1940, the Dr. George Middleton House became a duplex. It was returned to a single-family home by the early 1980s.

== Architecture ==
Architect Frederick G. Clausen designed this house in the Neoclassical style. It features a hipped roof and two dormers that have their own hipped roof and gabled rooflines. The dormer unit projects slightly forward and is held in place with brackets. Below the dormers are two round-arch windows that are also bracketed and have an eccentric border. A large porch features four columns of the Doric order and clapboard covered piers. A two-story polygonal bay below a bracketed gable is located on the back of the south side of the house. The second front door from when the house was converted into a duplex remains as does a second-floor sun porch on the rear of the house.
