= The Linograph Company Building =

- U.S. National Register of Historic Places
- Davenport Register of Historic Properties
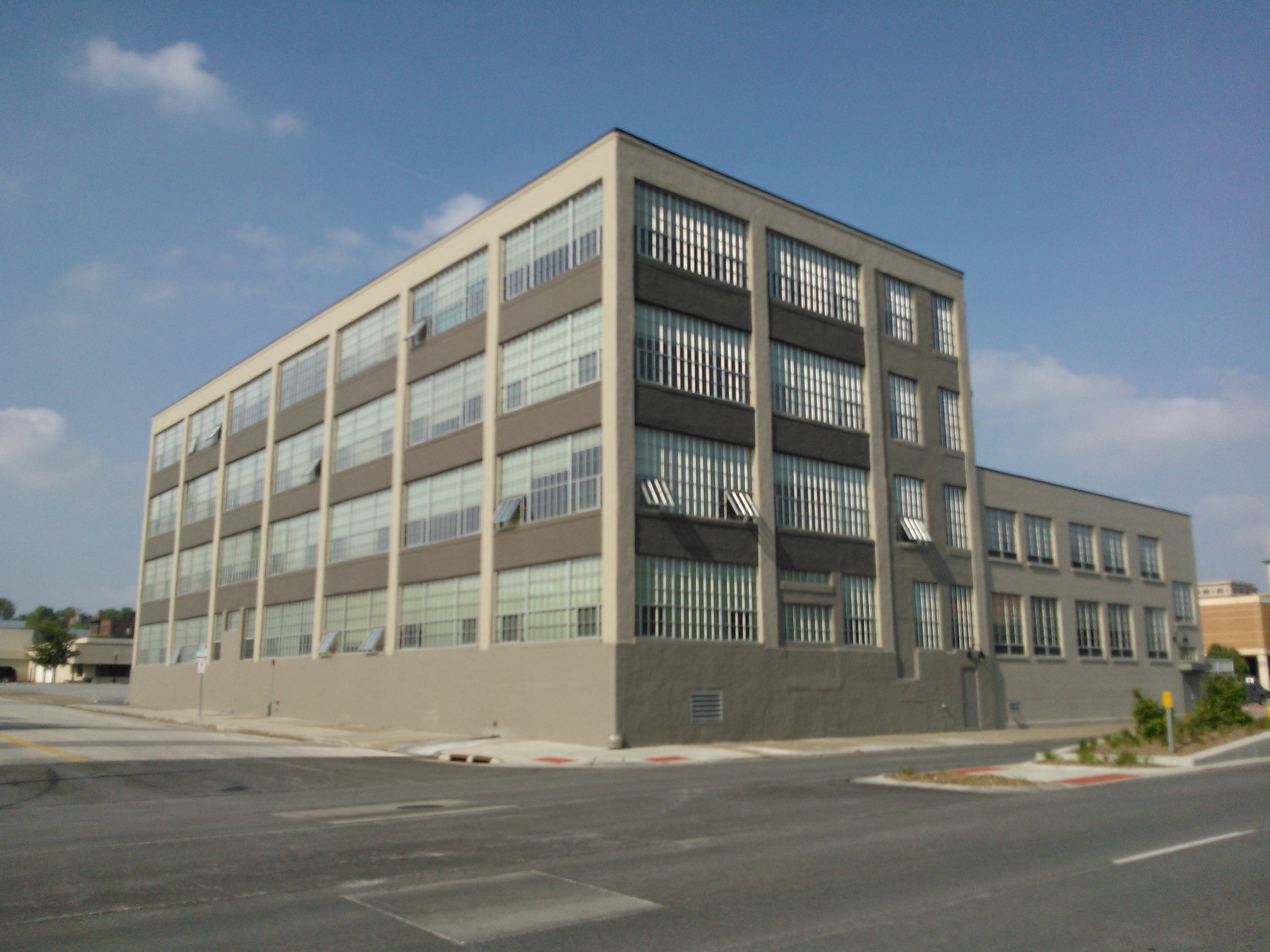

- Location within Iowa Location within the United States
- Location: 420 W. River Drive; Davenport, Iowa
- Coordinates: 41°31′13″N 90°34′46″W
- Area: less than one acre
- Built: 1920, 1949
- Architect: Clausen & Kruse; Arthur Ebeling
- Architectural style: Late 19th and Early 20th Century American Movements
- NRHP reference No.: 09000764
- DRHP No.: 51

Significant dates
- Added to NRHP: September 23, 2009
- Designated DRHP: January 13, 2009

The Linograph Company Building, also known as the Englehart Manufacturing Company Building and RiverWalk Lofts , is a historic building located in downtown Davenport, Iowa, United States. It was listed on the Davenport Register of Historic Properties and on the National Register of Historic Places in 2009.

== History ==
The Linograph Company Building was designed by two prominent Davenport architects. The original building was the work of the architectural firm of Clausen & Kruse. The 1949 addition was the work of Arthur Ebeling.

The building was an industrial facility for the company, which made the Linograph typesetting machine. The machines were distributed internationally, as well as across the country, and they "contributed significantly to the advancement of the typesetting process." The company occupied the building until 1944 when it was sold to a competitor, Intertype Corporation and Englehart Manufacturing Co. In 1954 The Salvation Army acquired the building, and used it for a variety of purposes, including an Adult Rehabilitation Center, which relocated in 2004. MetroPlains Development of St. Paul, Minnesota bought the building in July 2007, and started converting the building into loft apartments in October of the same year. The $8 million project was completed in 2009.

== Architecture ==
The building is a four-story, rectangular structure built of concrete on a raised concrete foundation. Extensions were added to the east of the original structure, which altered the building's main entrance. Some of the windows were filled in over the years, but large windows were placed in the building's fenestration during the 2009 renovation. A loading dock on the south side of the building was covered over at some point.
