= Harvest Time Family Worship Center =

- First Church of Christ, Scientist
- U.S. National Register of Historic Places
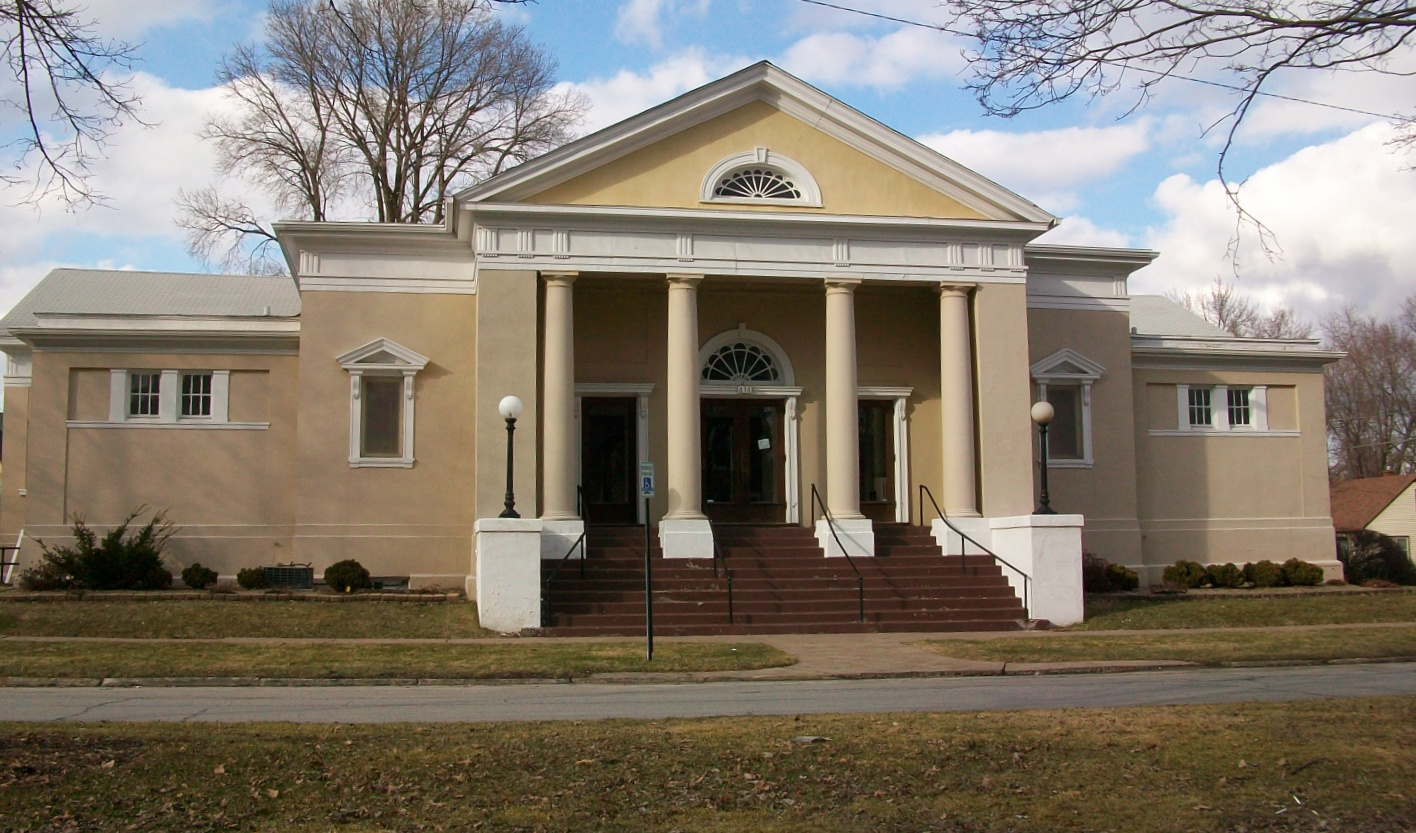
- The church building in 2010

- Location within Iowa Location within the United States
- Location: 636 Kirkwood Boulevard; Davenport, Iowa
- Coordinates: 41°32′11″N 90°33′54″W
- Area: less than one acre
- Built: 1912
- Architect: Clausen & Clausen
- Architectural style: Classical Revival
- MPS: Davenport MRA
- NRHP reference No.: 84001406
- Added to NRHP: July 27, 1984

The Harvest Time Family Worship Center, is a historic building that houses a Pentecostal congregation located in Davenport, Iowa, United States. It was added to the National Register of Historic Places in 1984 as the First Church of Christ, Scientist.

== History ==
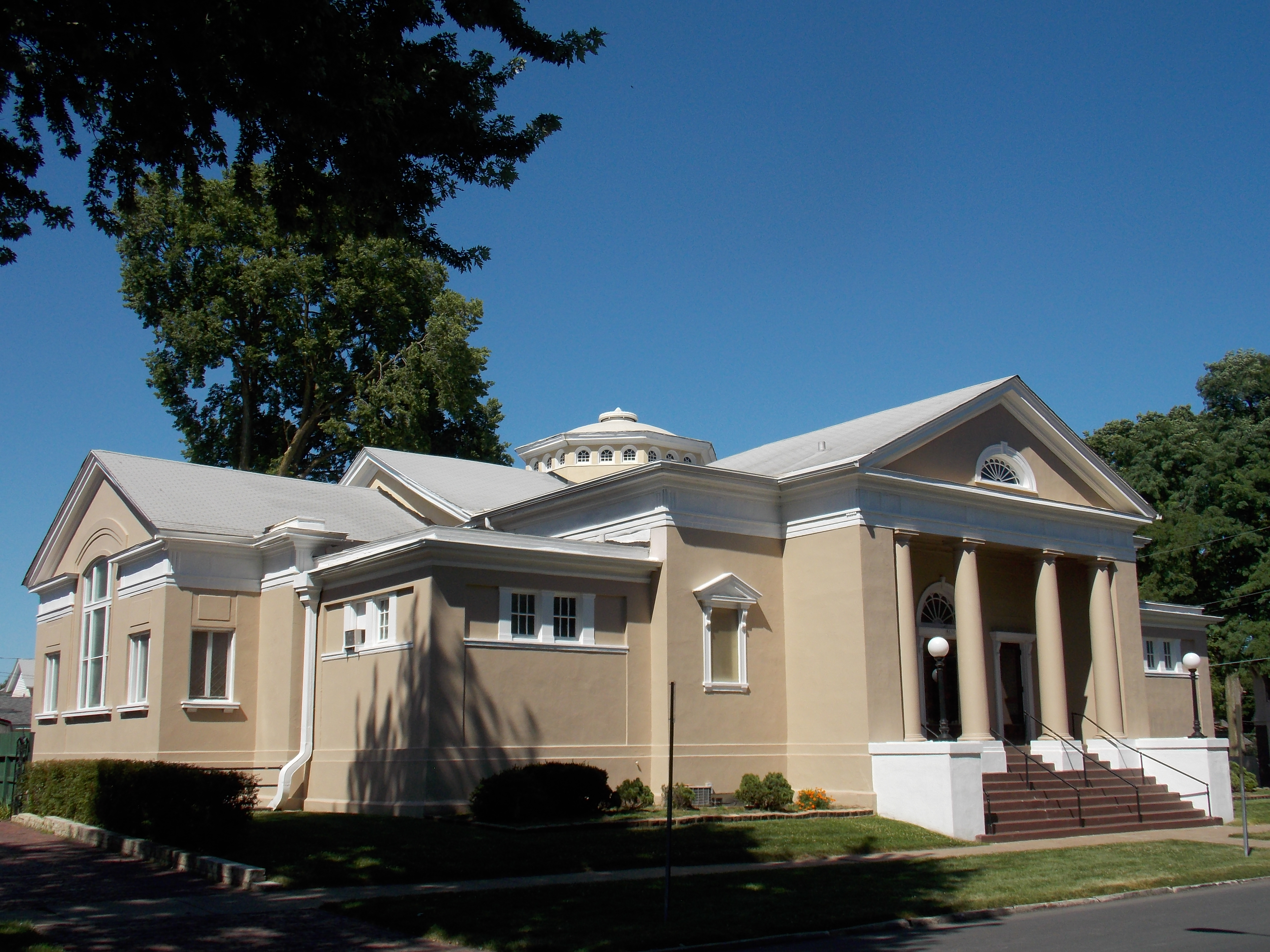
View of the historic church from the southwest.

The First Church of Christ, Scientist was established in Davenport in 1892 by 16 practitioners as a branch of the mother church in Boston. They built this building, which was designed by the prominent Davenport architectural firm of Clausen & Clausen, in 1912. A Christian Science Reading Room was opened downtown. First Church moved in the 1970s to a new facility on Fairhaven Road in Davenport.

The Harvest Time Family Worship Center was founded by the Revs. James and Cecelia Lee as the Pentecostal Deliverance Church in 1972. It was located in the 1500 block of Fillmore Street at the time. The congregation moved to this location in 1980.

== Architecture ==
The historic structure is a severe example of the Neoclassical style. The cross plan of the building is the only religious symbolism employed. It is very similar in that way to the original St. Anthony's Catholic Church (1836) downtown. The main facade is dominated by the tetrastyle temple front with columns in antis that follow the Doric order. The main entrance into the church is recessed behind the tetrastyle "screen" and it is surmounted by a fanlight. The entry itself is made up of three openings and follows a Palladian motif. The central opening features a rounded arch. At the crossing in the center of the structure is a polygonal belvedere. The wood and concrete structure is covered with stucco.

== See also ==
- National Register of Historic Places listings in east Davenport, Iowa
