= Smith Wildman and Jennie (Hearne) Brookhart House =

Historic house in Iowa, United States

- U.S. National Register of Historic Places
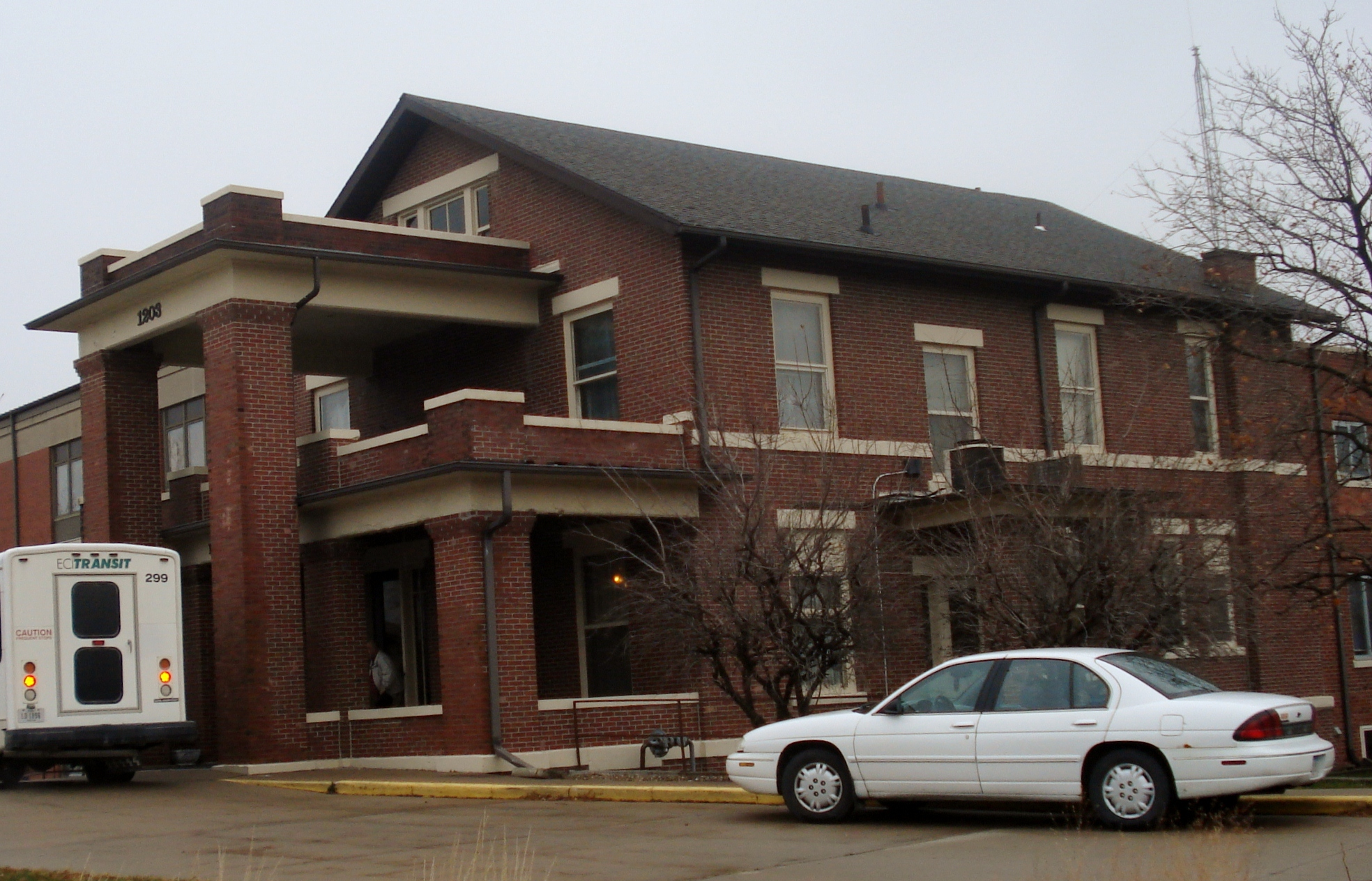

- Location within Iowa Location within the United States
- Location: 1203 East Washington; Washington, Iowa
- Coordinates: 41°17′52.54″N 91°40′41.86″W
- Area: 2.9 acres (1.2 ha)
- Built: 1910
- Architect: Clausen & Clausen
- Architectural style: Late 19th and Early 20th Century American Movements
- NRHP reference No.: 05000905
- Added to NRHP: August 22, 2005

The Smith Wildman and Jennie (Hearne) Brookhart House, now a part of the United Presbyterian Home, is a historic building located in Washington, Iowa, United States. It was listed on the National Register of Historic Places in 2005. Smith Wildman Brookhart was a lawyer, and was elected twice to the United States Senate as a Republican. He was a “fervent dry,” and fought the repeal of Prohibition while in the Senate. He also was a member of a group of senators from the Midwest and West that fought for government assistance for farmers. He married Jennie Hearne in 1897, and they had four sons and two daughters.

The Davenport architectural firm of Clausen & Clausen designed the house in a simple American Craftsman design, with an unadorned exterior and interior. It was completed in 1910. The two-story "fireproof" house is constructed of concrete, hollow ceramic tile, steel rods, steel mesh, and brick. Noteworthy is the double front porch. A broad single story porch stretches the width of the main facade, while the separate central portion of the porch reaches to the second floor. Originally the house was located on a small farm outside of town, but Washington grew to include the property. It became the offices of the United Presbyterian Home in 1946. The home's south wing, Sherman Hall, was built onto the back of the Brookhart house in the 1950s. Stewart Hall was added around 1980.
