= St. John's United Methodist Church (Davenport, Iowa) =

- St. John's Methodist Church
- U.S. National Register of Historic Places
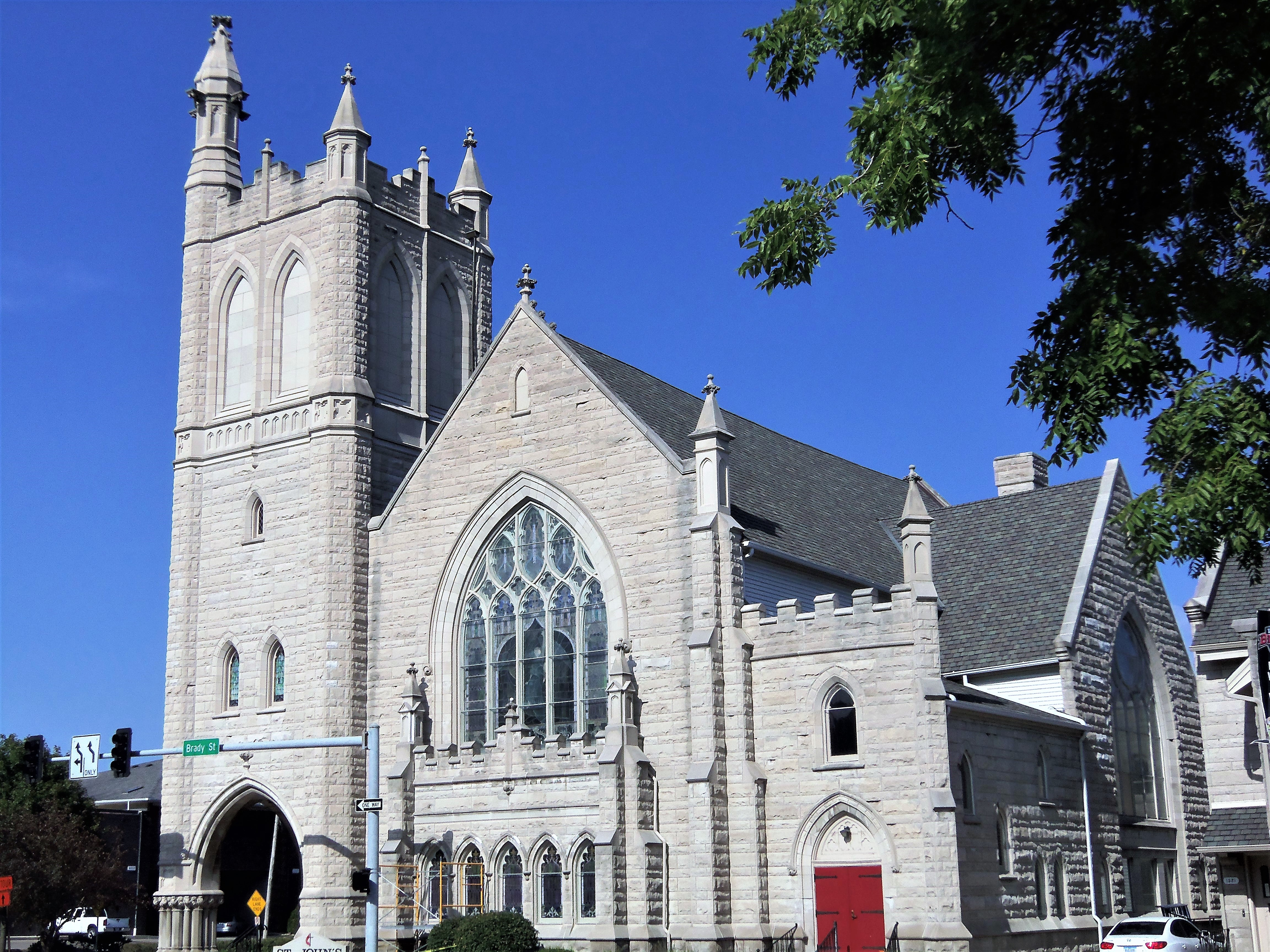
- St. John's Church in 2012

- Location within Iowa Location within the United States
- Location: 1325-1329 Brady St. Davenport, Iowa
- Coordinates: 41°32′1″N 90°34′25″W
- Area: 2 acres (0.81 ha)
- Built: 1903
- Architect: Parke Burrows; Frederick G. Clausen
- Architectural style: Late Gothic Revival
- MPS: Davenport MRA
- NRHP reference No.: 83002509
- Added to NRHP: July 7, 1983

St. John's United Methodist Church is located in central Davenport, Iowa, United States. It was listed on the National Register of Historic Places in 1983.

== History ==
=== Development of the Methodist Church in Davenport ===
The beginning of the Methodist Church in Davenport can be traced to the arrival of the Rev. E. C. Gavit of the Ohio Conference who was sent to minister among the Sac and Fox tribes in 1835. He was also instructed to visit White settlements along the way and from them, he was to receive his financial support. While he resided in the area that would become Davenport, his missionary territory stretched from the Missouri state border to St. Anthony Falls in Minnesota, which is in present-day Minneapolis.

In August 1836 the Methodist Society was organized in Rockingham, Iowa, the present southwest side of Davenport, with the assistance of the Illinois Conference. It consisted of seven or eight people. D.C. James had been assigned to the Rock Island District and preached at Rockingham. Later that year the Rockingham Circuit was formed. The circuit included an area of about 200 miles (320 km). It stretched from the Iowa River on the south to the Wapsipinicon River on the north and went inland to where ever there was a White settlement. Chauncey Hobart was put in charge of the circuit.

The first services in the city of Davenport itself were held in the spring of 1837 at the house of D.D. Eldridge. The missionary E.C. Gavit led the service and preached.

The first organized church in Davenport started in 1839 when William L. Cook was authorized to form a church organization. He found seven people and they formed the first class in Davenport. In a year it would grow to 20 members. Rev. Francis H. Chenowith was sent to be the first preacher in Davenport and a church building was begun in 1841 on the west side of Perry Street between Fourth and Fifth Streets. The small structure was built of brick and measured 30 by 40 feet (9.1 by 12.2 m). The congregation took the name Davenport Methodist Episcopal Church and later First Methodist Episcopal Church.

The congregation continued to grow and in 1853 plans were drawn up for a new church building at the corner of Fifth and Brady Streets. The new building was completed the following summer, and a parsonage was built soon after. In 1856 Wesley Chapel was formed with 60 members. The parent church had 375 members.

The congregation continued to grow and it was decided their church building was again too small. In 1867 property was purchased on top of the hill at the corner of 14th and Brady Streets. The Fourteenth Street Methodist Episcopal Church was formed at that location. Other small congregations also formed from the main church: Spring Street Church, Cook Chapel, and Gilruth Chapel. In 1873 a new main church was built further up Brady Street because the trains on 5th Street created too much noise.

=== St. John’s Church ===
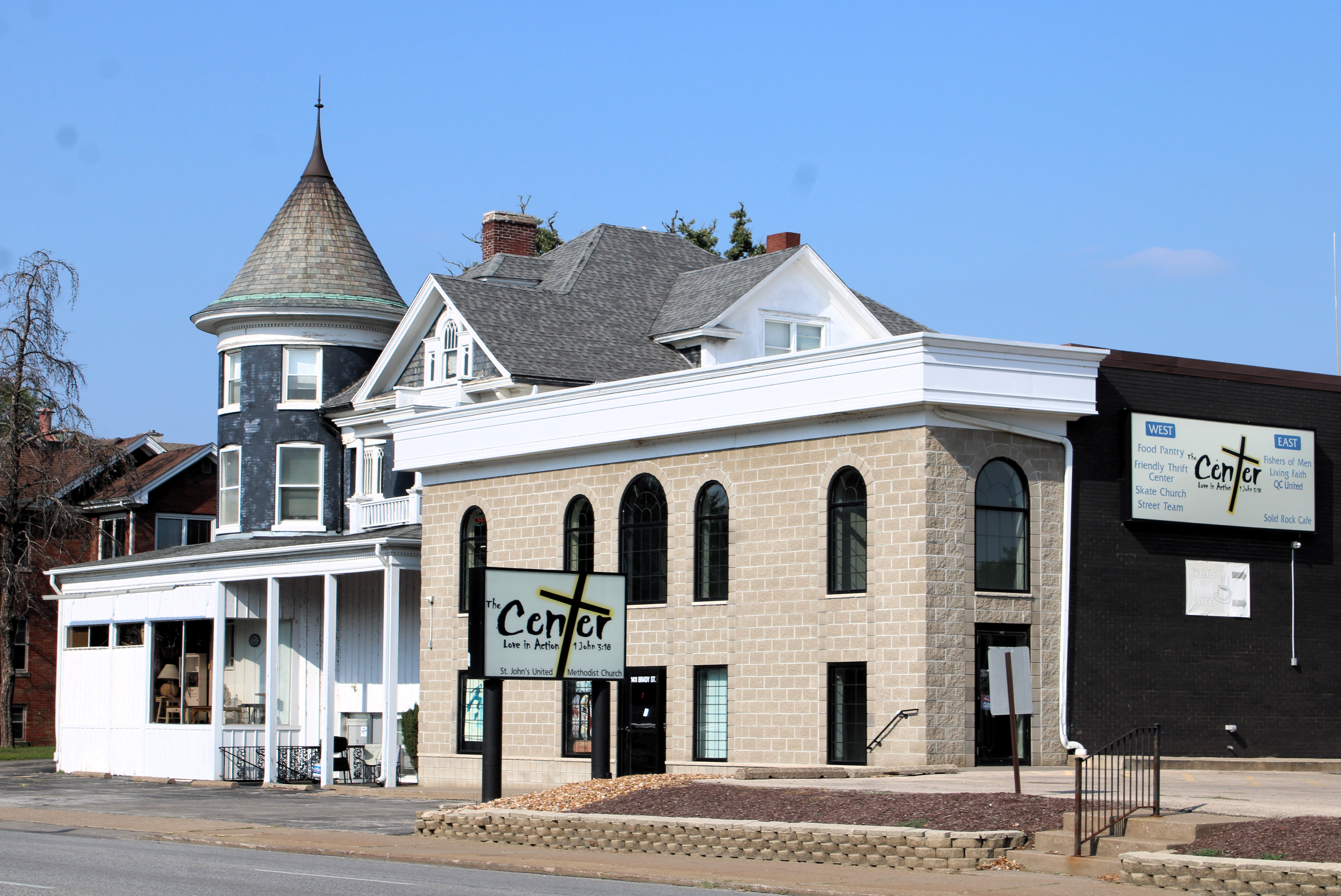
The center, which houses St. John's outreach ministries.

In 1899 First Methodist Episcopal Church and Fourteenth Street Methodist Episcopal Church were reorganized into Central Methodist Episcopal Church. In 1902 the cornerstone of the present church building was laid at the 14th and Brady location. Parke T. Burrows was the designing architect and Frederick G. Clausen was the superintending architect.

The new building was dedicated on December 13, 1903, as St. John's. It was built at a cost of $112,000. The church building has a large rectangular sanctuary and an imposing corner tower. In the early 20th century it had a congregation of 1,030 and a Sunday School of 623 pupils. Other Methodist congregations were formed in the 20th century: Grace (1925), Faith, and Christ (1965). St. John's has remained the largest congregation.

The church property expanded in the 21st century when the church renovated a former furniture store across 14th Street. Called The center, it created more space to expand the church's outreach ministries. An alternative worship site was created at Wertz Funeral Home at Kimberly and Jersey Ridge Roads. The location moved in 2007 to Eisenhower Elementary School.

== Architecture ==
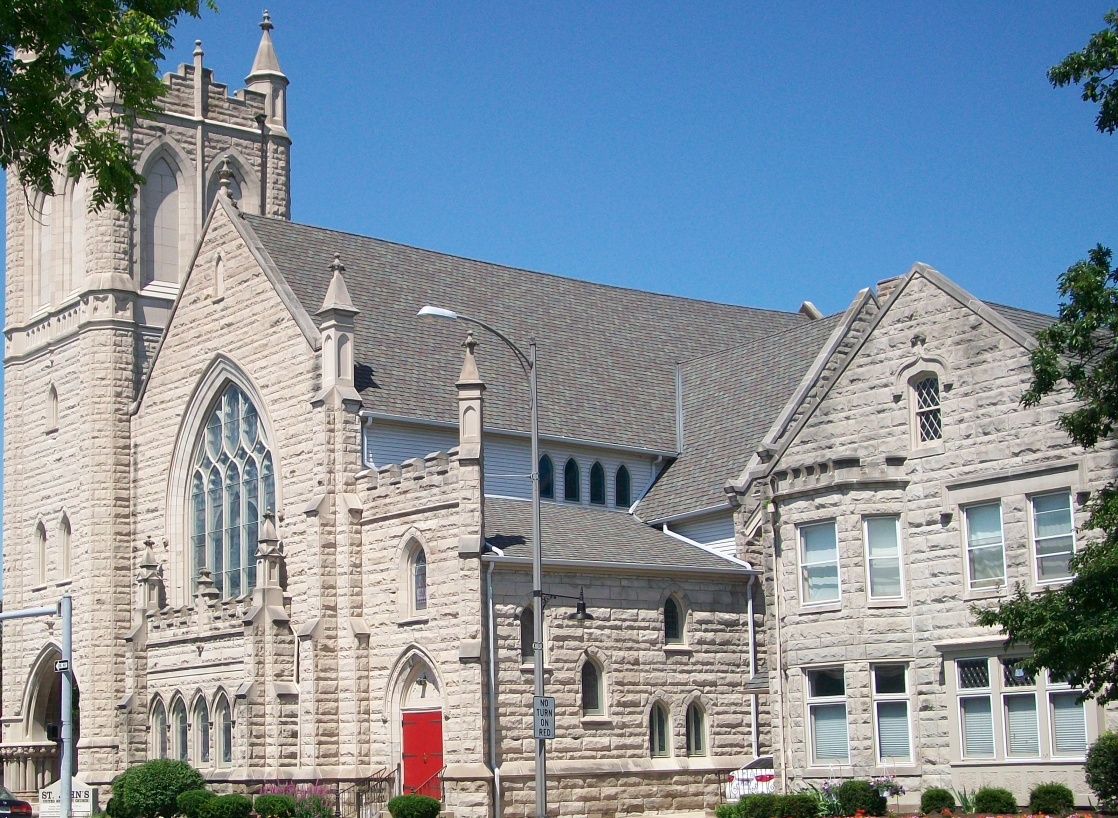
The parsonage can be seen on the right.

St. John's is a cruciform-plan structure with a prominent corner tower. The building is constructed of limestone in the English Gothic style. Instead of the soaring verticality, which is typical of a Gothic style church, St. John's presents a relatively low profile. This is emphasized in its strong horizontal masonry coursing and the massing of solid, geometrical forms. The main entrance into the church is located beneath the arched tower base. Large tracery windows dominate the west, north and south elevations. Lancet windows are found throughout the structure. A parsonage is located to the south of the church building and is constructed of the same materials. An education building is attached to the southeast corner of the sanctuary.

== Pipe organ ==
The M.P. Moller (Op. 9404, 1960) pipe organ features a traditional style console with roll top. It is equipped with three manuals, four divisions, 40 stops, 26 registers, 33 ranks, 1998 pipes and electro-pneumatic (EP) unit chests. The manual compass is 61 notes and the pedal compass is 32 notes. The drawknobs are organized in vertical rows on angled jambs. The balanced swell shoes/pedals are in standard AGO placement. The combination action is a remote pneumatic/mechanical capture system. Rounding out the features are AGO Standard (concave radiating) pedalboard, reversible full organ/tutti thumb piston, reversible full organ/tutti toe stud, combination action thumb pistons, and coupler reversible toe studs.

Stoplist:

GREAT

- 16' Quintade 61
- 8' Principal 61
- 8' Holzgedeckt 61
- 4' Octave 61
- 4' Quintaton 24
- 2' Blockflöte 61
- IV Fourniture 244
- Tremolo
- Unison Off
- Super
- Chimes 21 (present)

CHOIR

- 16' Erzähler 61
- 8' Lochgedeckt 61
- 8' Erzähler 12
- 8' Erzähler Celeste 49
- 4' Nachthorn 61
- 2' Prinzipal 61
- II Sesquialtera 122
- 8' Trumpet 61 (7" wind)
- Tremolo
- Sub
- Unison Off
- Super

SWELL

- 8' Bordun 61
- 8' Viola 61
- 8' Viola Celeste 54 GG
- 4' Prestant 61
- 4' Koppelflöte 61
- 2' Zauberflöte 61
- III Plein Jeu 183
- 16' Fagot 61 (1-42 L/2)
- 8' Trompette 61
- 4' Hautbois 61 (1-18 L/2)
- Tremolo
- Sub
- Unison Off
- Super

PEDAL

- 16' Contre Basse 32
- 16' Quintade GT
- 16' Erzähler CH
- 8' Geigen 12
- 8' Rohrgedeckt 32
- 8' Quintaton GT
- 8' Erzähler CH
- 4' Octave 12
- 4' Rohrflöte 12
- 2' Rohrflöte 12
- II Grave Mixture 64
- II Rauschquinte 24
- 16' Double Trumpet 12
- 8' Trumpet CH
- 4' Clarion CH
