= Linograph typesetting machine =

Line casting machine in letterpress printing

The Linograph typesetting machine was a "line casting" machine, modeled on the Linotype machine, that was used in letterpress printing. It was manufactured by the Linograph Corporation of Davenport, Iowa from July 1912 until sometime after 1938.

== History ==
When Ottmar Mergenthaler’s basic patent on a machine for casting type and then re-distributing matrixes expired in 1902 and 1909, it became possible for competitors to enter the field with machines compatible with Linotype matrixes. The Linograph and Intertype soon emerged with rival machines. By 1920 over 700 Linographs had been sold.

The Linograph design was simpler than the Linotype. Its innovative design was created by Hans Pedersen (later Peterson, 1872 - 1924), a Danish-American.
