= Forrest Block =

- U.S. National Register of Historic Places
- U.S. Historic district – Contributing property
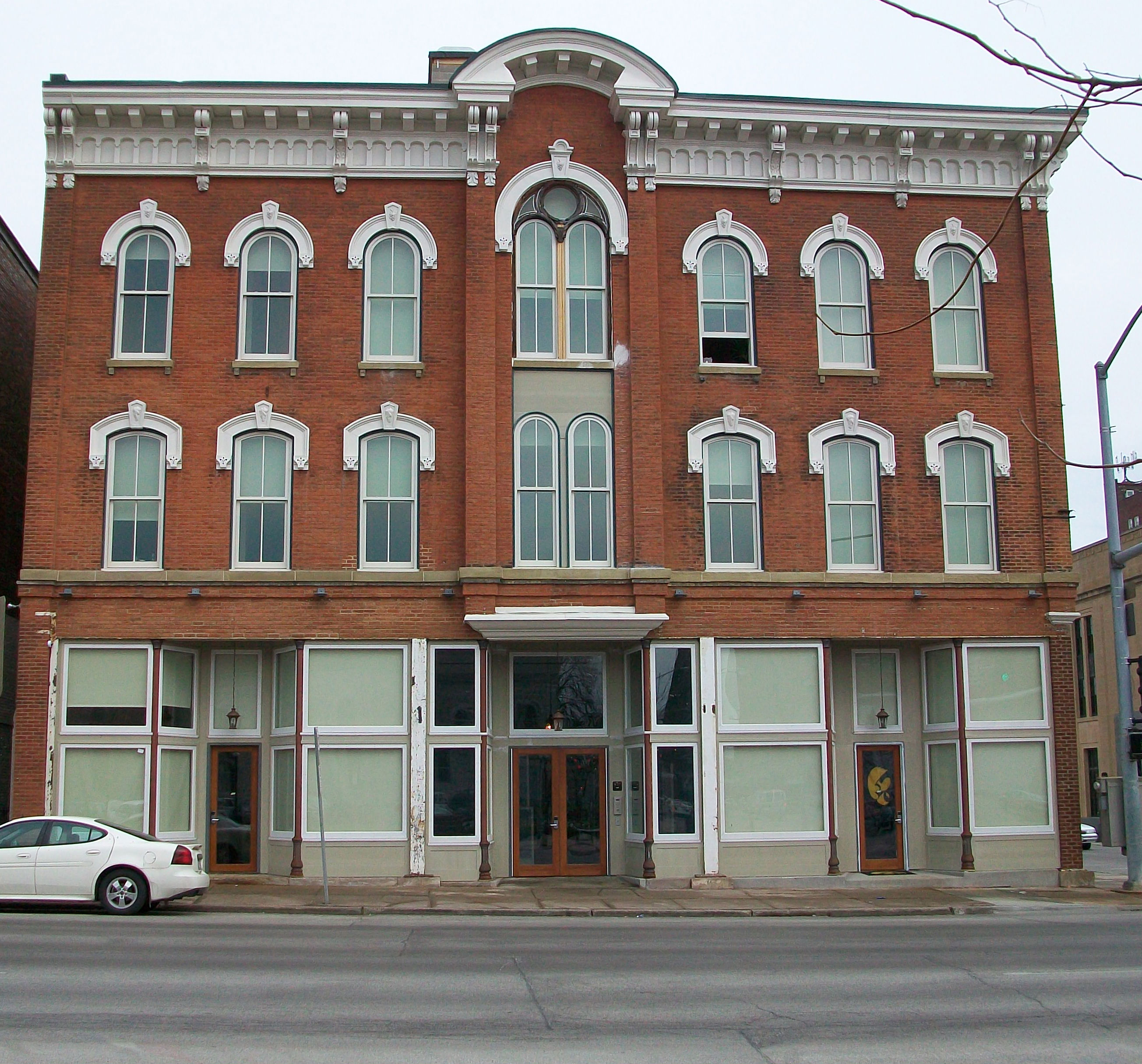

- Location within Iowa Location within the United States
- Location: 401 Brady St. Davenport, Iowa
- Coordinates: 41°31′22″N 90°34′26″W
- Area: less than one acre
- Built: 1875
- Built by: J.H. Whittaker
- Architect: Frederick G. Clausen
- Architectural style: Italianate
- Part of: Davenport Downtown Commercial Historic District (ID100005546)
- MPS: Davenport MRA
- NRHP reference No.: 83002433
- Added to NRHP: July 7, 1983

The Forrest Block is a historic building located in downtown Davenport, Iowa, United States. It was individually listed on the National Register of Historic Places in 1983. In 2020 it was included as a contributing property in the Davenport Downtown Commercial Historic District.

== History ==
The Forrest Block was constructed in 1875 by John Forrest as a commercial block. Forrest was a capitalist who invested his financial resources in several buildings downtown. This is the location of the homestead where he lived for 33 years before he redeveloped it. It is one of a number of large commercial buildings in Davenport that were designed in an elaborate Italianate style during the decade after the American Civil War. Prominent Davenport architect Frederick G. Clausen designed the building and J.H. Whittaker was the general contractor. The building is designed to have retail businesses on the main floor and professional offices on the upper floors.

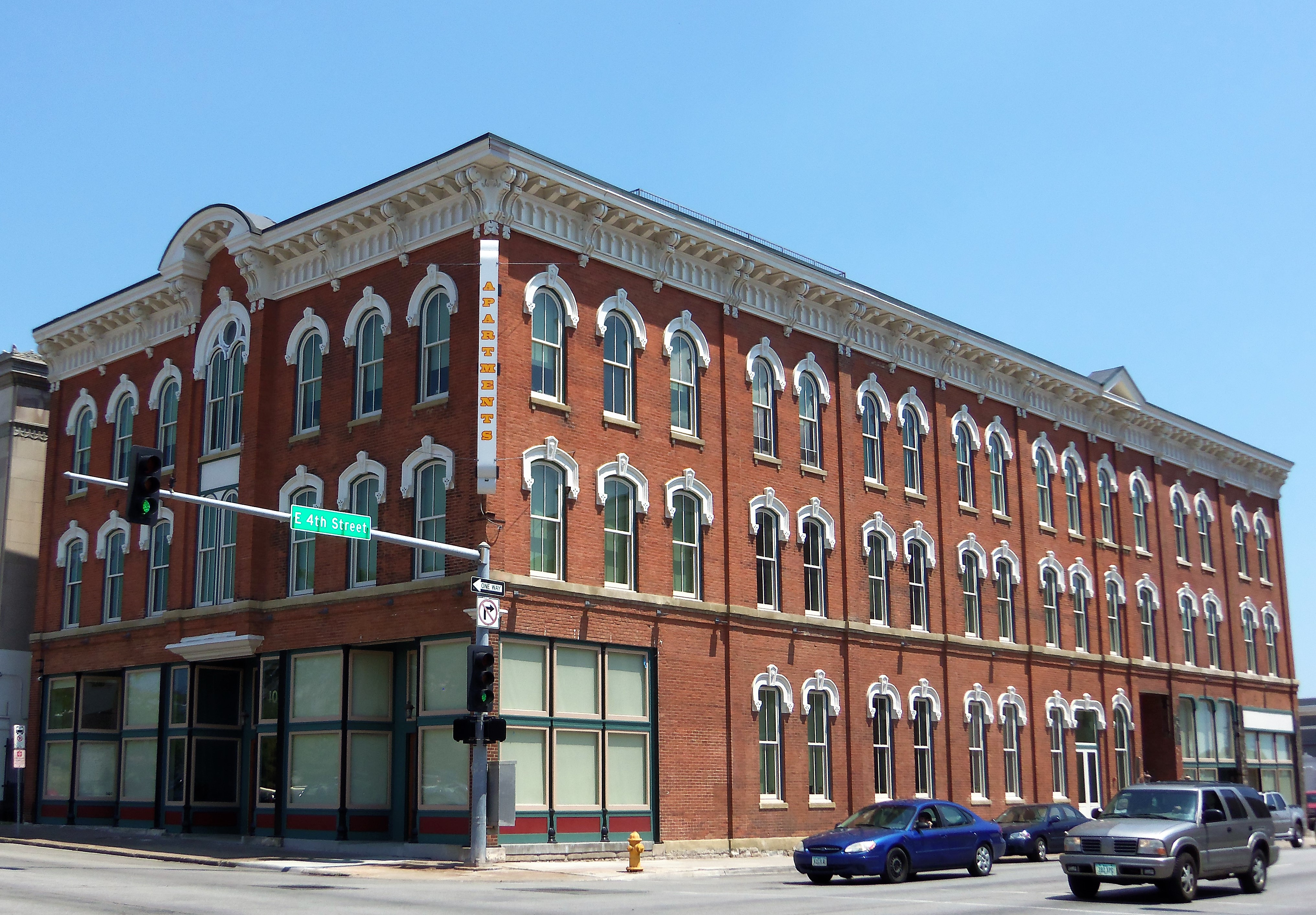
Forrest Block from the southwest

Over the course of its history, the building has housed small retail businesses, doctor's offices, a billiards parlor, a tavern, and an adult movie theater. The second floor was the location of the city's YMCA organization in 1886. The Ancient Order of United Workmen (AOUW) was located on the third floor. The post office occupied the corner storefront from 1889 to 1996. Other organizations that have been housed in the building include the Davenport Health Institute, the Tri-City Institute of Osteopathy, the Davenport Cooking School, and the Woodmen Hall. Dr. Jennie McCowen, a physician and a locally prominent leader for women’s rights, had her office in the building for many years. The second and third floors housed apartments in its more recent history. The building was called the Henley block for a while starting in 1910. The Forrest Block had not been occupied since the 1980s and was nearly torn down in 1991 to make way for a parking lot, but the city council blocked demolition because of protests by historic preservationists. Although it deteriorated over the years, the building remained structurally sound because when it was constructed it was "over-built" with extra floor bracing and other heavy-duty construction elements. The building's owners in 1999 received a state grant to install a new roof that helped stabilize the building as well.

Highland Brothers bought the building for $130,000 in 2005. The following year they announced plans to convert the building into 10 luxury condominiums and commercial space on the first-floor. Work began on the renovation project, but soon ended. In 2009 the building was bought by Restoration St. Louis, who also owned the Hotel Blackhawk, which they were in the process of renovating at the time. They started renovating the Forrest Block building in March 2010. The $3.5 million renovation turned the building into 24 market rate apartments. Four of the units are live-and-work spaces. The building, which is 36,000 square feet (3,300 m^{2}), was divided into one-, two- and three-bedroom apartments. Some of the apartments face an interior courtyard. The project was completed in January 2011. A rooftop garden was also added to the building.

== Architecture ==
The Forrest Block is a three-story, brick structure built on a stone foundation. It features a seven-bay symmetrical front and 17 bays on the upper floor of the southern elevation. Its location on a corner lot contributes to its imposing character. On the exterior of the building, each floor is distinct from the others. The windows on the main floor are nearly flat and become more rounded as they ascend. Each window has its own elaborate hood. The building is crowned with an imposing, bracketed cornice of pressed metal. On the Brady Street elevation the building features a pavilion which projects from the façade. It contains oversized Roman arched windows and a segmented cornice.
