= Davenport Crematorium =

- U.S. National Register of Historic Places
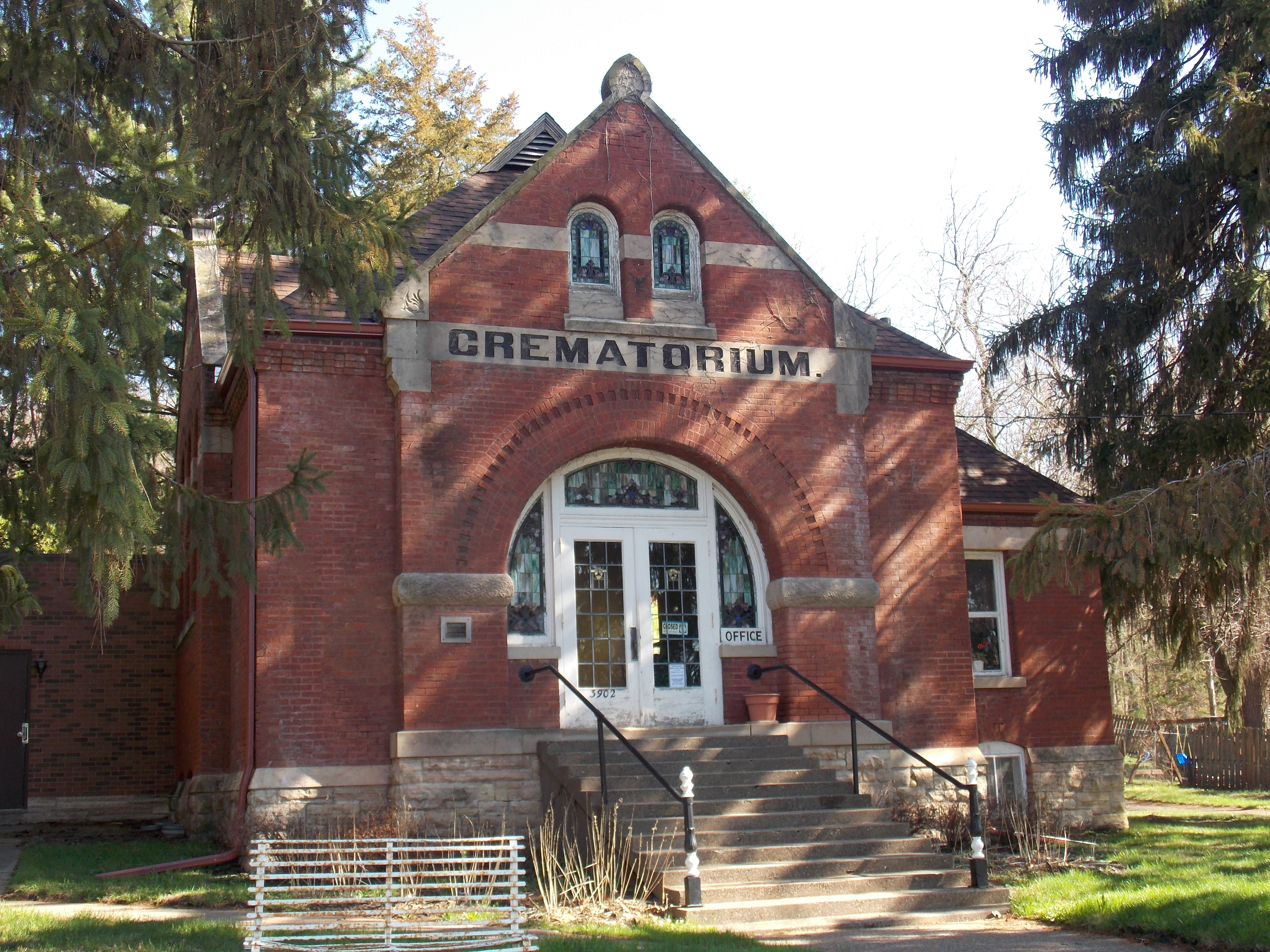
- Davenport Crematorium in 2014

- Location within Iowa Location within the United States
- Location: 3902 Rockingham Road; Davenport, Iowa
- Coordinates: 41°30′37″N 90°37′53″W
- Area: less than one acre
- Built: 1891
- Architect: F.G. Clausen
- Architectural style: Romanesque Revival
- NRHP reference No.: 83002418
- Added to NRHP: January 19, 1983

The Davenport Crematorium is located in Fairmount Cemetery in the West End of Davenport, Iowa, United States. It was the first crematorium established in the state of Iowa and one of the oldest in the United States. The facility was listed on the National Register of Historic Places in 1983.

== History ==
The first attempt to established a crematorium in Davenport occurred in 1880, four years after the first crematorium opened in the United States. There was little to show for this effort until 1885 when the Northwestern Cremation Society, later renamed the Davenport Cremation Society, was established. The society sold stock to raise funds and in 1889 commissioned prominent local architect, Frederick G. Clausen, to design a building. The following year they purchased land from the West Davenport Cemetery Association, now known as Fairmount Cemetery. The facility opened in 1891 and the first cremation was that of Otto Kochert on May 15 of that year. The crematorium was the first in the state of Iowa and thirteenth in the United States. It is the ninth oldest crematorium still in existence in the United States.

Initially, the crematorium served not only the city of Davenport, but the needs of the state of Iowa and larger cities such as Chicago, Minneapolis, Omaha, and Denver. In its first ten years it performed 133 cremations, by the mid-1980s it handled 6,000, and by 2014 that number has grown to 11,700 cremations. A small addition was made to the west side of the building in 1979 when a second crematory retort was added. Initially, the crematory used coke or hard coal for fuel and it took an hour and a half to complete the process. In later years the facility changed to natural gas and the time it took to complete the cremation process diminished. The building also houses Fairmount Cemetery's offices.

== Architecture ==
The 1½-story brick structure was designed in the Romanesque Revival style. It rests on a base composed of rubble-squared stone blocks over a partially raised, full basement. A hipped, cross gabled roof caps the building. Its exterior ornamentation is found in the round-arch doorway with stained glass sidelights and transom; lintels and bands created from carved stone; and gables trimmed in stone containing round-arch windows; and brick corbelling near the roofline. The main floor of the interior features a chapel, waiting area, and office space. The cremation retorts (incinerators) and holding room are in the basement.

== Fairmount Cemetery ==
The cemetery was established as the West Davenport Cemetery in 1881 by stockholders who were mostly of German descent. The first burial in the cemetery was John Dibbern on August 1, 1881. It acquired the name Fairmount Cemetery in 1900. A mausoleum, with 530 crypts, was constructed in 1929. By 2014 the cemetery had performed more than 18,600 burials.
