= National Register of Historic Places listings in west Davenport, Iowa =

This is a list of the National Register of Historic Places listings in west Davenport, Iowa. This is intended to be a complete list of the properties and districts on the National Register of Historic Places in west Davenport, Iowa, United States. West Davenport is defined as being all of the city west of Marquette Street and between Marquette and Brady Streets (U.S. Route 61 and north of 5th Street. The locations of National Register properties and districts may be seen in an online map.

There are 257 properties and districts listed on the National Register in Davenport. West Davenport includes 110 of these properties and districts; the city's remaining properties and districts are listed elsewhere. Many of these properties were included in a multiple property submission; they are marked below as "Davenport MRA." Two properties were once listed but have been removed.

This National Park Service list is complete through NPS recent listings posted December 12, 2025.

== Current listings ==
	Name on the Register	Image	Date listed	Location	City or town	Description
1	E.P. Adler House	E.P. Adler House	July 7, 1983 (#83002394)	2104 Main St. 41°32′27″N 90°34′33″W	Davenport	A c.1910 Colonial Revival, home of a leading businessman; Davenport Multiple Resource Area (MRA).
2	Ambrose Hall	Ambrose Hall	April 11, 1977 (#77000553)	518 W. Locust; 41°32′20″N 90°34′51″W	Davenport	The center section of the Second Empire building was built in 1885, and with additions, the building housed St. Ambrose College in its entirety until 1927. It continues to function as a college building.
3	American Telegraph & Telephone Co. Building	American Telegraph & Telephone Co. Building	July 7, 1983 (#83002396)	529 Main St. 41°31′32″N 90°34′31″W	Davenport	Two-story Richardsonian Romanesque commercial building from 1902; Davenport MRA.
4	Argyle Flats	Argyle Flats	July 7, 1983 (#83002397)	732 Brady St. 41°31′39″N 90°34′28″W	Davenport	Four-story apartment building designed by Davenport architectural firm Claussen & Burrows from 1902; Davenport MRA.
5	John W. Ballard House	John W. Ballard House	July 7, 1983 (#83002398)	205 W. 16th St. 41°32′09″N 90°34′33″W	Davenport	Late Victorian home from 1910; Davenport MRA.
6	Richard Benton House	Richard Benton House	July 7, 1983 (#83002399)	2204 and 2210 W. 3rd St. 41°31′21″N 90°36′42″W	Davenport	An Italianate and Greek Revival style residence from 1855; Davenport MRA.
7	Louis P. and Clara K. Best Residence and Auto House	Louis P. and Clara K. Best Residence and Auto House	May 28, 2010 (#10000296)	627 Ripley St. 41°31′36″N 90°34′41″W	Davenport	Mission Revival style home on the edge of the Hamburg Historic District.
8	Bethel AME Church	Bethel AME Church	July 7, 1983 (#83002401)	325 W. 11th St. 41°31′51″N 90°34′41″W	Davenport	Bungalow style building that was built by members of Davenport's African-American community; Davenport MRA.
9	Brammer Grocery Store	Brammer Grocery Store	July 7, 1983 (#83002404)	1649 W. 3rd St. 41°31′19″N 90°36′03″W	Davenport	Greek Revival style commercial building; Davenport MRA.
10	Alden Bryan House	Alden Bryan House	July 7, 1983 (#83002405)	2236 W. 3rd St. 41°31′21″N 90°36′45″W	Davenport	Greek Revival style house from 1870; Davenport MRA.
11	Buchanan School	Buchanan School	July 7, 1983 (#83002406)	2104 W. 6th St. 41°31′33″N 90°36′32″W	Davenport	Two-story Colonial Revival style building built on a raised basement. It was designed by the Davenport architectural firm of Clausen & Burrows; Davenport MRA.
12	William V. Carr House	William V. Carr House	July 7, 1983 (#83002410)	1531 W. 3rd St. 41°31′20″N 90°35′52″W	Davenport	House from c. 1860; Davenport MRA.
13	William Claussen House	William Claussen House	July 7, 1983 (#83002412)	2215 W. 2nd St. 41°31′15″N 90°36′41″W	Davenport	Greek Revival syle house from 1855; Davenport MRA.
14	Clifton	Clifton	February 21, 1979 (#79000940)	1533 Clay St. 41°31′50″N 90°35′51″W	Davenport	Italianate and Greek Revival style house from 1853.
15	College Square Historic District	College Square Historic District	November 18, 1983 (#83003628)	Roughly bounded by Brady, Main, Harrison, 11th, and 15th Sts. 41°31′56″N 90°34′33″W	Davenport	The site of two former colleges is now the location of a high school and Episcopal Cathedral campuses and a residential area; Davenport MRA.
16	Columbia Avenue Historic District	Columbia Avenue Historic District	November 1, 1984 (#84000298)	Roughly W. Columbia Ave. and Harrison, Ripley, and W. Hayes Sts. 41°32′49″N 90°34′40″W	Davenport	Residential area that contains brick apartment buildings that were built between 1930 and 1939; Davenport MRA.
17	Clarissa Cook Home for the Friendless	Clarissa Cook Home for the Friendless	July 7, 1983 (#83002414)	2223 W. 1st St. 41°31′11″N 90°36′38″W	Davenport	Built as a home for “destitute and indigent females” in 1884, it continues as a residence for female senior citizens; Davenport MRA.
18	Cottage at 1514 and 1516 W. Second Street	Cottage at 1514 and 1516 W. Second Street	July 7, 1983 (#83002416)	1514–1516 W. 2nd St. 41°31′17″N 90°35′51″W	Davenport	Residence built c. 1850; Davenport MRA.
19	Davenport Crematorium	Davenport Crematorium	January 19, 1983 (#83002418)	3902 Rockingham Rd. 41°30′34″N 90°38′04″W	Davenport	Designed by Davenport architect Frederick G. Clausen in the Romanesque Revival style. It is located in Fairmont Cemetery.
20	Davenport Downtown Commercial Historic District	Davenport Downtown Commercial Historic District	September 11, 2020 (#100005546)	2nd St. to 5th St., Perry St. to Western Ave. 41°31′23″N 90°34′14″W	Davenport	The district includes about 14 blocks of the central business district. It includes the elevated railroad tracks that runs along the north side of the downtown area.
21	Davenport Water Co. Pumping Station No. 2	Davenport Water Co. Pumping Station No. 2	April 5, 1984 (#84001338)	1416 Ripley St. 41°32′04″N 90°34′43″W	Davenport	Italianate style industrial building constructed in 1884; Davenport MRA.
22	Marie Clare Dessaint House	Marie Clare Dessaint House	November 1, 1984 (#84000300)	4808 Northwest Boulevard; 41°34′11″N 90°35′14″W	Davenport	Italian Villa that was built in what was a rural area outside of Davenport in 1870; Davenport MRA
23	Arthur Ebeling House	Arthur Ebeling House	July 27, 1984 (#84001397)	1106 W. 15th St. 41°32′07″N 90°35′21″W	Davenport	Colonial Revival style home of Davenport architect Arthur Ebeling; Davenport MRA.
24	Henry Ebeling House	Henry Ebeling House	July 27, 1984 (#84001399)	1623 W. 6th St. 41°31′32″N 90°35′58″W	Davenport	Late Victorian home from 1888; Davenport MRA.
25	Edward Edinger House	Edward Edinger House	July 7, 1983 (#83002424)	1018 W. 9th St. 41°31′45″N 90°35′17″W	Davenport	Late Victorian home designed by Davenport architect Edward S. Hammatt in 1890; Davenport MRA.
26	Henry P. Fennern House	Henry P. Fennern House	April 5, 1984 (#84001405)	1332 W. 4th St. 41°31′25″N 90°35′37″W	Davenport	Residence built in 1902; Davenport MRA.
27	Fred Finch House	Fred Finch House	July 7, 1983 (#83002428)	719 Main St. 41°31′39″N 90°34′31″W	Davenport	Colonial Revival home designed by Dietrich J. Harfst in 1905; Davenport MRA.
28	First Bible Missionary Church	First Bible Missionary Church	July 7, 1983 (#83002429)	2202 W. 4th St. 41°31′25″N 90°36′41″W	Davenport	Romanesque Revival building that was built by a Congregationalist Church congregation in the early 20th century; Davenport MRA.
29	First National Bank of Davenport	First National Bank of Davenport	September 13, 2018 (#100002918)	1606 Brady St. 41°32′10″N 90°34′29″W	Davenport	Three-story modern bank and office building completed in 1967.
30	Frick's Tavern	Frick's Tavern	September 9, 1974 (#74000808)	1402–1404 W. 3rd St. 41°31′21″N 90°35′40″W	Davenport	Two-story, Italianate style commercial building from 1872.
31	D. Julius Gaspard House	D. Julius Gaspard House	July 7, 1983 (#83002437)	510 W. 10½ St. 41°31′49″N 90°34′49″W	Davenport	Greek Revival style house from 1880; Davenport MRA.
32	Jacob Goering House	Jacob Goering House	July 7, 1983 (#83002440)	721 Harrison St. 41°31′39″N 90°34′37″W	Davenport	Greek Revival style house of an early labor organizer in Davenport; Davenport MRA.
33	Charles Grilk House	Charles Grilk House	July 27, 1984 (#84001423)	2026 Main St. 41°32′25″N 90°34′33″W	Davenport	Bungalow/Craftsman and Colonial Revival style house designed in 1906 by the Davenport architectural firm of Temple, Burrows & McLane; Davenport MRA.
34	Hamburg Historic District	Hamburg Historic District	November 18, 1983 (#83003656)	Roughly bounded by 5th, Vine, Ripley, and 9½ Sts.; also roughly bounded by W. 5th, 6th, 7th, 8th & 9th Sts. 41°31′36″N 90°34′57″W	Davenport	Residential district above downtown Davenport where middle and upper class German immigrants settled in the mid to late 19th century; Davenport MRA. Second set of addresses represent a boundary adjustment approved January 17, 2017.
35	Robert Henne House	Robert Henne House	July 7, 1983 (#83002445)	1445 W. 3rd St. 41°31′20″N 90°35′46″W	Davenport	Greek Revival style house from 1874; Davenport MRA.
36	John Hoersch House	John Hoersch House	November 1, 1984 (#84000304)	716 Vine St. 41°31′38″N 90°35′16″W	Davenport	House built in 1879; Davenport MRA.
37	Samuel Hoffman Jr. House	Samuel Hoffman Jr. House	July 7, 1983 (#83002448)	2108 W. 3rd St. 41°31′21″N 90°36′35″W	Davenport	Stick/Eastlake style house from 1915; Davenport MRA.
38	Hose Station No. 6	Hose Station No. 6	July 7, 1983 (#83002450)	1410 Marquette St. 41°32′03″N 90°35′31″W	Davenport	Neighborhood fire station from 1910; Davenport MRA.
39	Hose Station No. 7	Hose Station No. 7	July 7, 1983 (#83002451)	1354 W. 4th St. 41°31′25″N 90°35′39″W	Davenport	Neighborhood fire station designed in the Italianate style; Davenport MRA.
40	House at 1646 W. Second Street	House at 1646 W. Second Street	July 7, 1983 (#83002452)	1646 W. 2nd St. 41°31′17″N 90°36′03″W	Davenport	House built in 1865; Davenport MRA.
41	House at 2123 W. Second Street	House at 2123 W. Second Street	July 7, 1983 (#83002453)	2123 W. 2nd St. 41°31′15″N 90°36′36″W	Davenport	Greek Revival style house from 1855; Davenport MRA.
42	House at 2212 W. River Drive	House at 2212 W. River Drive	November 1, 1984 (#84000309)	2212 W. River Dr. 41°30′35″N 90°36′25″W	Davenport	House built in 1855; Davenport MRA.
43	Theodore Jansen House	Theodore Jansen House	July 7, 1983 (#83002455)	922 Myrtle St. 41°31′46″N 90°35′22″W	Davenport	Queen Anne style house from 1888; Davenport MRA.
44	Henry Kahl House	Henry Kahl House	July 7, 1983 (#83002457)	1101 W. 9th St. 41°31′41″N 90°35′22″W	Davenport	Mission/Spanish Revival style home designed by Davenport architect Arthur Ebeling in 1920. It became part of the Kahl Home for the Aged and Infirm; Davenport MRA.
45	Albert Kiene House	Albert Kiene House	July 27, 1984 (#84001450)	1321 W. 8th St. 41°31′39″N 90°35′37″W	Davenport	Second Empire style home from 1881; Davenport MRA.
46	George Klindt House	George Klindt House	July 7, 1983 (#83002459)	902 Marquette St. 41°31′44″N 90°35′30″W	Davenport	Second Empire style home; Davenport MRA.
47	Henry Klindt House	Henry Klindt House	July 27, 1984 (#84001454)	834 Marquette St. 41°31′43″N 90°35′29″W	Davenport	Queen Anne style home from 1890; Davenport MRA.
48	Koch Drug Store	Koch Drug Store	July 27, 1984 (#84001457)	1501 Harrison St. 41°32′06″N 90°34′37″W	Davenport	Late Victorian commercial building from 1881; Davenport MRA.
49	Nicholas Koester Building	Nicholas Koester Building	July 7, 1983 (#83002461)	1353 W. 3rd St. 41°31′20″N 90°35′39″W	Davenport	Italianate style commercial building from 1890; Davenport MRA.
50	Gustov C. Lerch House	Gustov C. Lerch House	July 7, 1983 (#83002463)	2222 W. 4th St. 41°31′25″N 90°36′44″W	Davenport	Shingle Style, Colonial Revival house from 1905; Davenport MRA.
51	John Lippincott House	John Lippincott House	July 7, 1983 (#83004527)	2122 W. 3rd St. 41°31′21″N 90°36′36″W	Davenport	Greek Revival style house from 1870; Davenport MRA.
52	Littig Brothers/Mengel & Klindt/Eagle Brewery	Littig Brothers/Mengel & Klindt/Eagle Brewery	July 7, 1983 (#83002464)	1235 W. 5th St. 41°31′28″N 90°35′31″W	Davenport	One of five breweries built in Davenport in the late 19th century; Davenport MRA.
53	John Littig House	John Littig House	November 1, 1984 (#84000310)	6035 Northwest Boulevard; 41°34′59″N 90°35′51″W	Davenport	A Shingle Style and Gothic Revival residence that was built in 1867; Davenport MRA.
54	John Lueschen House	John Lueschen House	July 27, 1984 (#84001468)	1628–1632 Washington St. 41°32′12″N 90°35′48″W	Davenport	Greek Revival style house from 1865; Davenport MRA.
55	August F. Martzahn House	August F. Martzahn House	July 7, 1983 (#83002466)	2303 W. 3rd St. 41°31′19″N 90°36′48″W	Davenport	A house built in a combination of the Prairie School and Bungalow/Craftsman styles in 1911; Davenport MRA.
56	Marycrest College Historic District	Marycrest College Historic District	April 14, 2004 (#04000341)	Portions of the 1500 and 1600 blocks of W. 12th St. 41°31′52″N 90°35′55″W	Davenport	Former Catholic college campus operated by the Congregation of the Humility of Mary. It is now a housing complex for senior citizens.
57	Patrick F. McCarthy House	Patrick F. McCarthy House	July 27, 1984 (#84001471)	942 Marquette St. 41°31′46″N 90°35′31″W	Davenport	Tudor Revival style house from 1905; Davenport MRA.
58	Joseph S. McHarg House	Joseph S. McHarg House	April 9, 1985 (#85000775)	5905 Chapel Hill Rd. 41°29′27″N 90°39′37″W	Davenport	Greek Revival style house from 1870; Davenport MRA.
59	McManus House	McManus House	July 7, 1983 (#83002469)	2320 Telegraph Rd. 41°31′27″N 90°36′48″W	Davenport	Italianate and Greek Revival style house from 1855: Davenport MRA.
60	Meadly House	Meadly House	July 27, 1984 (#84001476)	1425 W. 10th St. 41°31′45″N 90°35′43″W	Davenport	Second Empire style house from 1881; Davenport MRA.
61	Dr. George McLelland Middleton House and Garage	Dr. George McLelland Middleton House and Garage	November 10, 1982 (#82001549)	1221 Scott St. 41°31′56″N 90°34′47″W	Davenport	Classical Revival style house designed by Davenport architect Fritz G. Clausen in 1903.
62	Miller Building	Miller Building	July 7, 1983 (#83002471)	724 Harrison St. 41°31′38″N 90°34′38″W	Davenport	Late Victorian commercial building; Davenport MRA.
63	Severin Miller House	Severin Miller House	July 7, 1983 (#83002473)	2200 Telegraph Rd. 41°31′32″N 90°36′38″W	Davenport	Second Empire style house from 1868; Davenport MRA.
64	Daniel T. Newcome Double House	Daniel T. Newcome Double House	July 7, 1983 (#83002475)	722–724 Brady St. 41°31′39″N 90°34′28″W	Davenport	Second Empire residential building by Davenport builder T.W. McClelland; Davenport MRA.
65	Northwest Davenport Savings Bank	Northwest Davenport Savings Bank	July 27, 1984 (#84001491)	1529 Washington St. 41°32′08″N 90°35′45″W	Davenport	Classical Revival commercial building from 1912; Davenport MRA.
66	Northwest Davenport Turner Society Hall	Northwest Davenport Turner Society Hall	July 10, 1979 (#79000941)	1602 Washington St. 41°32′10″N 90°35′48″W	Davenport	Built in 1882. One of three Davenport Turnvereins.
67	Henry Pahl House	Henry Pahl House	July 7, 1983 (#83002480)	1946 W. 3rd St. 41°31′21″N 90°36′25″W	Davenport	Greek Revival style house from 1880; Davenport MRA.
68	B.J. Palmer House	B.J. Palmer House	July 27, 1984 (#84001497)	808 Brady St. 41°31′43″N 90°34′28″W	Davenport	Second Empire house built in 1874. It became the home of B.J. Palmer, who along with his father, developed the practice of chiropractic; Davenport MRA.
69	Peter J. Paulsen House	Peter J. Paulsen House	July 7, 1983 (#83002481)	705 Main St. 41°31′37″N 90°34′31″W	Davenport	Queen Anne style house built in 1895; Davenport MRA.
70	Henry Paustian House	Henry Paustian House	July 7, 1983 (#83002482)	1226 W. 6th St. 41°31′33″N 90°35′30″W	Davenport	Early example of a stone house built in the city of Davenport; Davenport MRA.
71	Peters' Barber Shop	Peters' Barber Shop	April 5, 1984 (#84001498)	1352 W. 3rd St. 41°31′21″N 90°35′39″W	Davenport	Single-story commercial building built in 1905; Davenport MRA.
72	J.C. Peters House	J.C. Peters House	July 27, 1984 (#84001500)	1339 W. 13th St. 41°31′57″N 90°35′35″W	Davenport	Greek Revival style house built in 1865; Davenport MRA.
73	Max Petersen House	Max Petersen House	December 25, 1979 (#79000942)	1607 W. 12th St. 41°31′50″N 90°35′57″W	Davenport	Queen Anne style house designed by Davenport architect Fredrick G. Clausen in 1888.
74	Frank Picklum House	Frank Picklum House	July 27, 1984 (#84001515)	1340 W. 7th St. 41°31′37″N 90°35′39″W	Davenport	House built in 1881;Davenport MRA.
75	Joachim Plambeck House	Joachim Plambeck House	July 27, 1984 (#84001516)	1421 W. 14th St. 41°32′01″N 90°35′41″W	Davenport	Late Victorian house from 1888; Davenport MRA.
76	Elizabeth Pohlmann House	Elizabeth Pohlmann House	July 27, 1984 (#84001518)	1403 W. 13th St. 41°31′57″N 90°35′39″W	Davenport	Queen Anne style house from 1896; Davenport MRA.
77	Henry Pohlmann House	Henry Pohlmann House	July 27, 1984 (#84001520)	1204 W. 13th St. 41°31′59″N 90°35′26″W	Davenport	House built in 1885; Davenport MRA.
78	F.J. Raible House	F.J. Raible House	November 28, 1983 (#83003683)	1537 W. 3rd St. 41°31′19″N 90°35′53″W	Davenport	Greek Revival style house built in 1870; Davenport MRA.
79	Ranzow-Sander House	Ranzow-Sander House	July 7, 1983 (#83002489)	2128 W. 3rd St. 41°31′21″N 90°36′37″W	Davenport	Queen Anne style house from 1881; Davenport MRA.
80	Jacob Raphael Building	Jacob Raphael Building	July 7, 1983 (#83002490)	628–630 Harrison St. 41°31′35″N 90°34′39″W	Davenport	Commercial building from 1875 that housed a cigar manufacturer; Davenport MRA.
81	Riverview Terrace Historic District	Riverview Terrace Historic District	November 1, 1984 (#84000339)	Roughly Riverview Terr. and Clay and Marquette Sts. 41°31′49″N 90°35′43″W	Davenport	Residential area consisting of 21 contributing buildings built around a park that overlooks the city's west end; Davenport MRA.
82	Royal Neighbors of America National Home Historic District	Royal Neighbors of America National Home Historic District	June 2, 2015 (#15000294)	4760 Rockingham Rd. 41°30′15″N 90°38′48″W	Davenport	A Georgian Revival style residential facility built in 1931. It was operated by the Royal Neighbors of America, a fraternal benefit society, from 1931 to 2004.
83	St. Joseph's Catholic Church	St. Joseph's Catholic Church	July 7, 1983 (#83002510)	W. 6th and Marquette Sts. 41°31′33″N 90°35′26″W	Davenport	The parish was founded in 1855 as St. Kunigunda to serve the city’s German community. The cornerstone for the present church was laid in 1881 when the parish name was changed to St. Joseph. The building currently houses Grace Fellowship Church; Davenport MRA.
84	St. Luke's Hospital	St. Luke's Hospital	July 7, 1983 (#83002511)	121 W. 8th St. 41°31′41″N 90°34′30″W	Davenport	Italianate style residence built by Daniel Newcomb that housed St. Luke’s Hospital when it was begun by the Episcopal Diocese of Iowa in 1892; Davenport MRA.
85	St. Mary's Academy	St. Mary's Academy	July 27, 1984 (#84001556)	1334 W. 8th St. 41°31′41″N 90°35′39″W	Davenport	Romanesque Revival parochial school building built in 1888. It later became a home for women and is now an apartment building; Davenport MRA.
86	St. Mary's Roman Catholic Church Complex	St. Mary's Roman Catholic Church Complex	April 5, 1984 (#84001558)	516, 519, 522, and 525 Fillmore Sts. 41°31′32″N 90°35′41″W	Davenport	Church, rectory, school and convent from St. Mary's parish. The buildings were built in the Romanesque and Colonial Revival styles; Davenport MRA.
87	St. Paul's English Lutheran Church	St. Paul's English Lutheran Church	July 7, 1983 (#83002512)	1402 Main St. 41°32′03″N 90°34′33″W	Davenport	Gothic Revival church building from 1902; Davenport MRA.
88	Richard Schebler House	Richard Schebler House	July 7, 1983 (#83002496)	1217 W. 7th St. 41°31′36″N 90°35′30″W	Davenport	Greek Revival house built in 1876; Davenport MRA.
89	F. Jacob Schmidt House	F. Jacob Schmidt House	July 7, 1983 (#83002499)	2143 and 2147 W. 5th St. 41°31′27″N 90°36′39″W	Davenport	Queen Anne style house built in 1890; Davenport MRA.
90	School Number 6	School Number 6	October 6, 2011 (#11000722)	1420 W. 16th St. 41°32′10″N 90°35′41″W	Davenport	1903 former school building that is being renovated into apartment units. Also known as Jackson School.
91	John C. Schricker House	John C. Schricker House	July 7, 1983 (#83002500)	1446 Clay St. 41°31′50″N 90°35′44″W	Davenport	Colonial Revival style house designed by Davenport architect Gustav Hansen in 1896; Davenport MRA
92	John Schricker House	John Schricker House	April 9, 1985 (#85000776)	5418 Chapel Hill Rd. 41°29′21″N 90°39′07″W	Davenport	House designed by the Davenport architectural firm of Clausen & Clausen in 1910; Davenport MRA.
93	Schroeder Bros. Meat Market	Schroeder Bros. Meat Market	July 7, 1983 (#83002501)	2146 W. 3rd St. 41°31′21″N 90°36′39″W	Davenport	Commercial Vernacular style building built in 1905; Davenport MRA.
94	Rudolph H. Sitz Building	Rudolph H. Sitz Building	July 7, 1983 (#83002506)	2202 W. 3rd St. 41°31′21″N 90°36′41″W	Davenport	Mission/Spanish Revival style commercial building; Davenport MRA.
95	Alvord I. Smith House	Alvord I. Smith House	July 7, 1983 (#83002507)	2318 W. 3rd St. 41°31′21″N 90°36′50″W	Davenport	Italianate style house from 1865; Davenport MRA.
96	Dr. Kuno Struck House	Dr. Kuno Struck House	July 27, 1984 (#84001567)	1645 W. 12th St. 41°31′50″N 90°36′01″W	Davenport	Tudor Revival style house designed by the Davenport architectural firm of Clausen & Kruse in 1911; Davenport MRA.
97	Taylor School	Taylor School	July 7, 1983 (#83002516)	1400 Warren St. 41°32′05″N 90°35′10″W	Davenport	Former school building designed in the Colonial Revival style by the Davenport architectural firm of Clausen & Burrows; Davenport MRA.
98	Lambert Tevoet House	Lambert Tevoet House	July 7, 1983 (#83002518)	2017 W. 2nd St. 41°31′16″N 90°36′28″W	Davenport	Greek Revival style house from 1870; Davenport MRA.
99	Trinity Episcopal Cathedral	Trinity Episcopal Cathedral	December 24, 1974 (#74000811)	121 W. 12th St. 41°31′52″N 90°34′28″W	Davenport	Only the second church built as a cathedral in the Protestant Episcopal Church. It was designed by New York architect Edward Tuckerman Potter in 1867 and opened in 1873. The tower, part of the original design, was completed in 1998.
100	Union Electric Telephone & Telegraph	Union Electric Telephone & Telegraph	July 7, 1983 (#83002519)	602 Harrison St. 41°31′33″N 90°34′39″W	Davenport	Classic Revival building that was constructed to house a now defunct telephone and telegraph company. It remains a commercial building; Davenport MRA.
101	Claus Untiedt House	Claus Untiedt House	July 27, 1984 (#84001577)	1429 W. 14th St. 41°32′04″N 90°35′42″W	Davenport	Late Victorian house built in 1890; Davenport MRA.
102	Vander Veer Park Historic District	Vander Veer Park Historic District	April 9, 1985 (#85000784)	Roughly bounded by Temple Lane, W. Central Park Ave., and Brady, High, and Harrison Sts. 41°32′35″N 90°34′28″W	Davenport	Established as Central Park on the former fair grounds, the botanical park and its surrounding neighborhoods make up the district; Davenport MRA. Extends into East Davenport.
103	Walter-Gimble House	Walter-Gimble House	July 7, 1983 (#83002522)	1232 W. 6th St. 41°31′33″N 90°35′31″W	Davenport	House that was built in 1875; Davenport MRA.
104	Washington Flats	Washington Flats	July 27, 1984 (#84001584)	1415–1431 Washington St. 41°32′04″N 90°35′45″W	Davenport	Two-story brick apartment building from 1905; Davenport MRA.
105	Washington Gardens	Washington Gardens	July 27, 1984 (#84001585)	1301 W. 13th St. 41°31′57″N 90°35′30″W	Davenport	Italianate commercial building from 1885 that has housed restaurants and taverns over the years; Davenport MRA.
106	Werthman Grocery	Werthman Grocery	July 27, 1984 (#84001588)	1402 W. 7th St. 41°31′37″N 90°35′40″W	Davenport	Commercial building from 1900; Davenport MRA.
107	Westphal-Schmidt House	Westphal-Schmidt House	July 27, 1984 (#84001591)	406 S. Fairmount St. 41°30′54″N 90°37′51″W	Davenport	Italianate style house from 1857; Davenport MRA.
108	Thomas C. Wilkinson House	Thomas C. Wilkinson House	July 27, 1984 (#84001592)	117 McManus St. 41°31′14″N 90°37′11″W	Davenport	Italian Villa style house built c. 1860; Davenport MRA.
109	Wolters Filling Station	Wolters Filling Station	July 27, 1984 (#84001595)	1229 Washington St. 41°31′57″N 90°35′46″W	Davenport	Small commercial structure in old Northwest Davenport; Davenport MRA.
110	Zoller Bros-Independent Malting Co.	Zoller Bros-Independent Malting Co.	July 7, 1983 (#83002527)	1801 W. 3rd St. 41°31′19″N 90°36′12″W	Davenport	One of five breweries that were established in Davenport in the 19th century; Davenport MRA.

== Former listings ==
	Name on the Register	Image	Date listed	Date removed	Location	City or town	Description
1	Clarissa C. Cook Library/Blue Ribbon News Building	Clarissa C. Cook Library/Blue Ribbon News Building	July 7, 1983 (#83002415 (different than Cook Memorial Library? 83004745))	December 19, 2014	528 Brady St. 41°31′31″N 90°34′28″W	Davenport	Davenport's first library building built in 1878; Davenport MRA.
2	Gilruth District #4 Schoolhouse	Gilruth District #4 Schoolhouse	September 16, 1977 (#77000555)	May 12, 2009	53rd and Marquette Sts. 41°34′27″N 90°35′26″W	Davenport	Demolished in 1991

== See also ==
- List of National Historic Landmarks in Iowa
- National Register of Historic Places listings in Iowa
