= Washington Gardens =

Washington Gardens may refer to:

== Places ==
In the United States

- Washington Gardens (Davenport, Iowa), listed on the National Register of Historic Places
- Washington Gardens (Boston), a former entertainment space
- Washington Gardens, a neighborhood in Detroit, Michigan
- Washington Gardens, a neighborhood in Hampton, Virginia

In Jamaica

- Washington Gardens, a neighborhood in Kingston
