= Henry Paustian House =

Historic house in Iowa, United States

- U.S. National Register of Historic Places
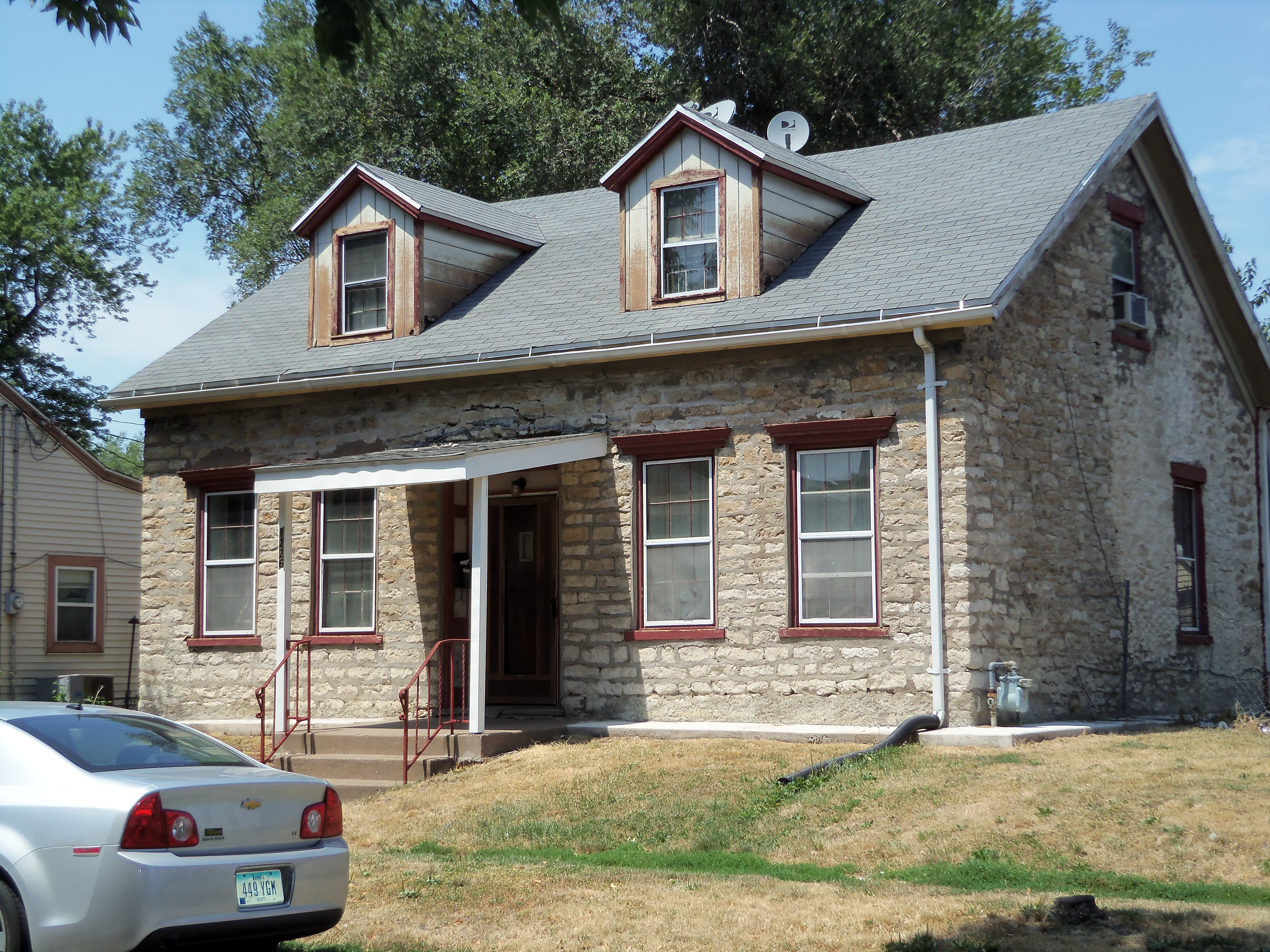

- Location within Iowa Location within the United States
- Location: 1226 W. 6th St. Davenport, Iowa
- Coordinates: 41°31′33″N 90°35′30″W
- Area: less than one acre
- Built: c. 1850
- MPS: Davenport MRA
- NRHP reference No.: 83002482
- Added to NRHP: July 7, 1983

The Henry Paustian House is a historic building located in the West End of Davenport, Iowa, United States. It has been listed on the National Register of Historic Places since 1983.

== History ==
There are very few examples left of the early houses built in the city of Davenport in the Vernacular style from its formative years, however, the Henry Paustian House is one such example. Henry C.F. Paustian was a carpenter and he may have had the assistance of John Paustian, a stone mason, to build this house. There are no city directories available before 1856 so it is impossible to accurately date the house, but it was probably built in the early 1850s.

== Architecture ==
The house is constructed of limestone. Typical elements of Davenport's early homes that are found in this structure are the single story, side-gable roof, and the entrance on the long side of the house. The only style elements of the house are found in its symmetry and the molded cornices above the windows and door.
