= Brammer Grocery Store =

- U.S. National Register of Historic Places
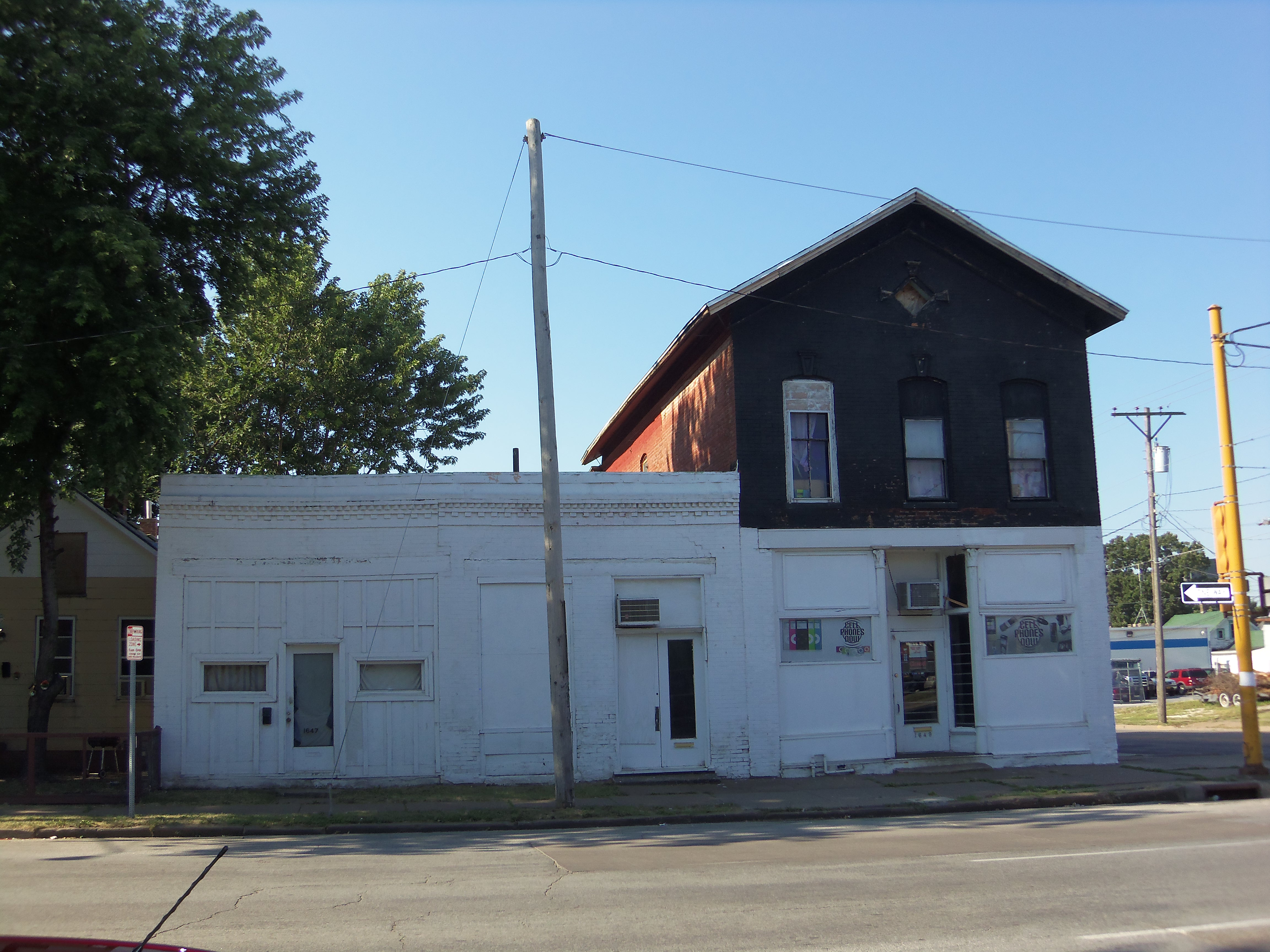
- Brammer Grocery Store in 2012

- Location within Iowa Location within the United States
- Location: 1649 W. 3rd St. Davenport, Iowa
- Coordinates: 41°31′19″N 90°36′3″W
- Area: less than one acre
- Built: 1885
- Architectural style: Greek Revival
- MPS: Davenport MRA
- NRHP reference No.: 83002404
- Added to NRHP: July 7, 1983

Brammer Grocery Store is a historic building located in the West End of Davenport, Iowa, United States. The building was listed on the National Register of Historic Places in 1983. The two-story, brick, Greek Revival style building is an example of a traditional local house form adapted to small-scale commercial use. It features a plain façade, a diamond-shaped light in the gable, and keystones over the second floor windows. John Brammer opened Brammer and Son, a grocery store, in this building in 1885. He joined with Louis Ott in 1895 and they added hardware and paint to their offerings. The store was renamed Brammer and Ott. The building has subsequently housed other business ventures over the years.
