= Rudolph H. Sitz Building =

- U.S. National Register of Historic Places
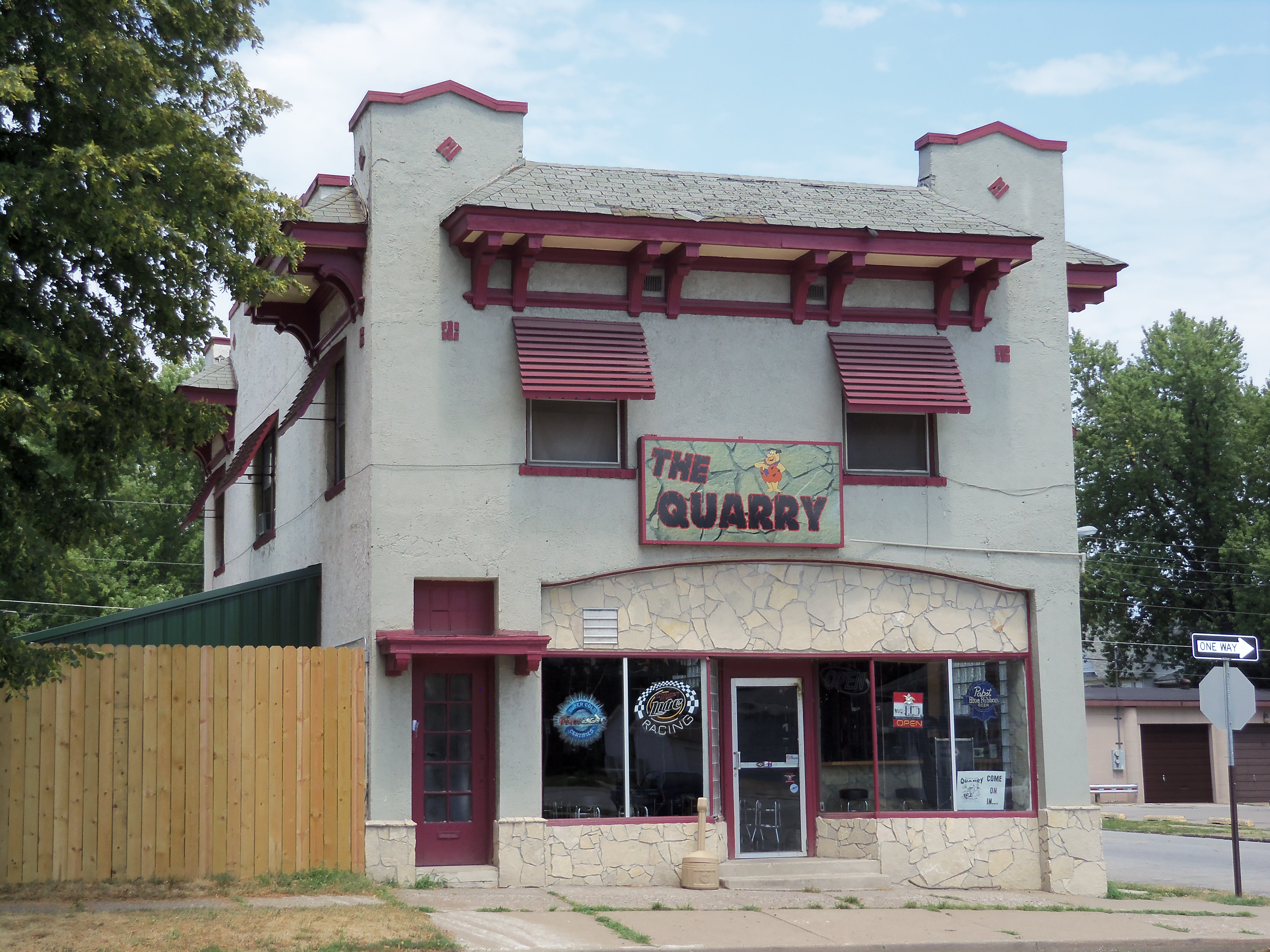

- Location within Iowa Location within the United States
- Location: 2202 W. 3rd St. Davenport, Iowa
- Coordinates: 41°31′21″N 90°36′41″W
- Area: less than one acre
- Built: 1913
- Architectural style: Mission/Spanish Revival
- MPS: Davenport MRA
- NRHP reference No.: 83002506
- Added to NRHP: July 7, 1983

The Rudolph H. Sitz Building is a historic building located in the West End of Davenport, Iowa, United States. Rudolph Sitz has this building built in 1913 to house his grocery store, which had been previously located at 2747 West Third Street. The building has subsequently been turned into a tavern. The two-story Mission Revival style structure features a curved, broken pediment, bracketed eaves on projecting eave sections, and an arch over the storefront. It is one of the few buildings in Davenport built in this style. It was listed on the National Register of Historic Places in 1983.
