= Elizabeth Pohlmann House =

Historic house in Iowa, United States

- U.S. National Register of Historic Places
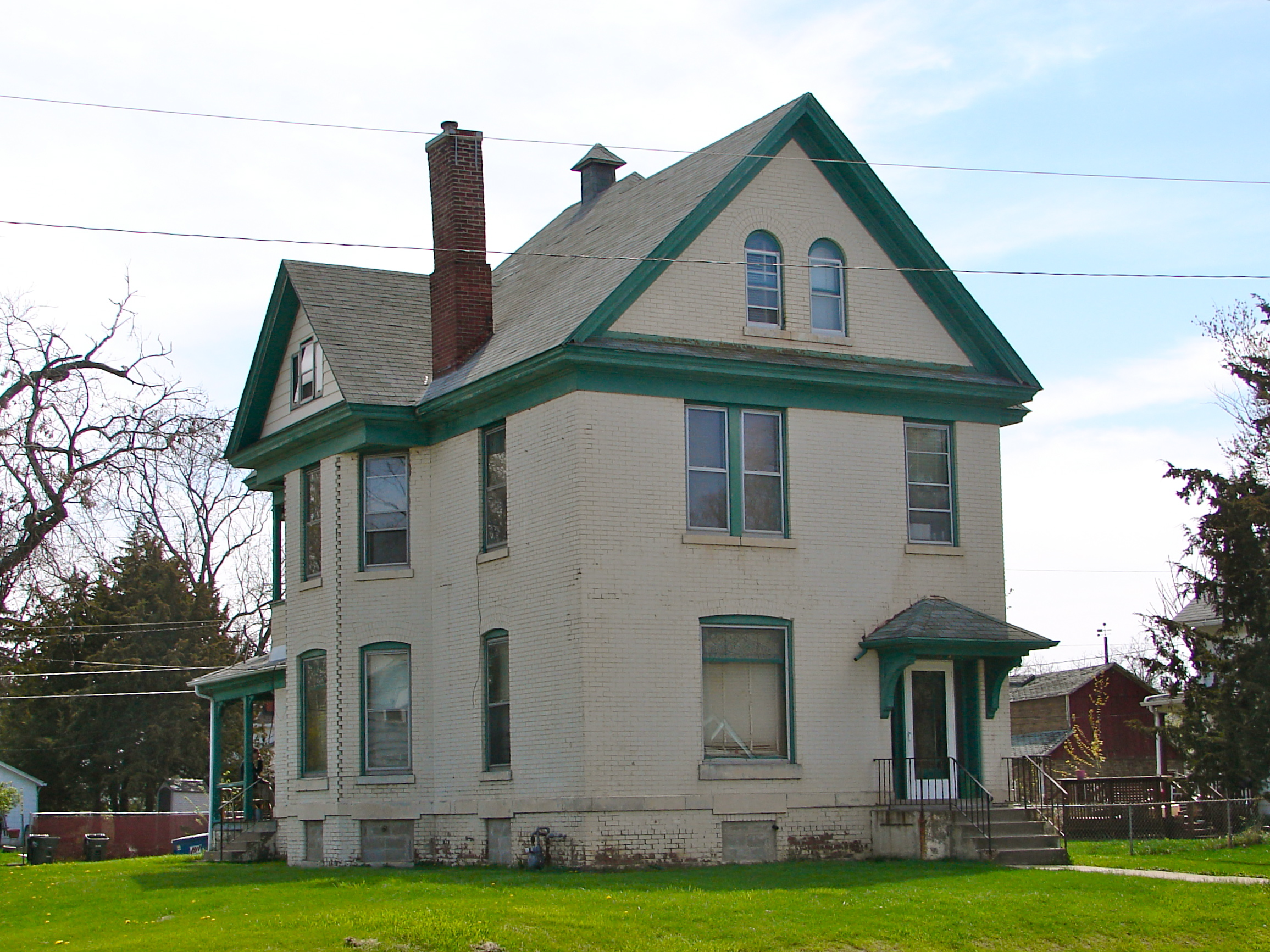

- Location within Iowa Location within the United States
- Location: 1403 W. 13th St. Davenport, Iowa
- Coordinates: 41°31′56″N 90°35′39″W
- Area: less than on acre
- Built: 1896
- Architectural style: Queen Anne
- MPS: Davenport MRA
- NRHP reference No.: 84001518
- Added to NRHP: July 27, 1984

The Elizabeth Pohlmann House is a historic building located in the West End of Davenport, Iowa, United States. Elizabeth Pohlmann was the widow of Herman B. Pohlmann, and she had this house built in 1896. The Pohlmann's were part of the German-ethnic community that lived on the northwest side of Davenport. The house features the hip roof and gable projections typically found in the Queen Anne style. But it also includes full cornice returns, which create pediments, and light colored brick typical of the Colonial Revival style. The 2½-story residence also features a main entrance framed by sidelights and an art glass transom over a plate glass parlor window. Both the front and the back of the house are missing prominent porches that were originally part of the structure. It has been listed on the National Register of Historic Places since 1984.
