= Washington Gardens (Davenport, Iowa) =

- U.S. National Register of Historic Places
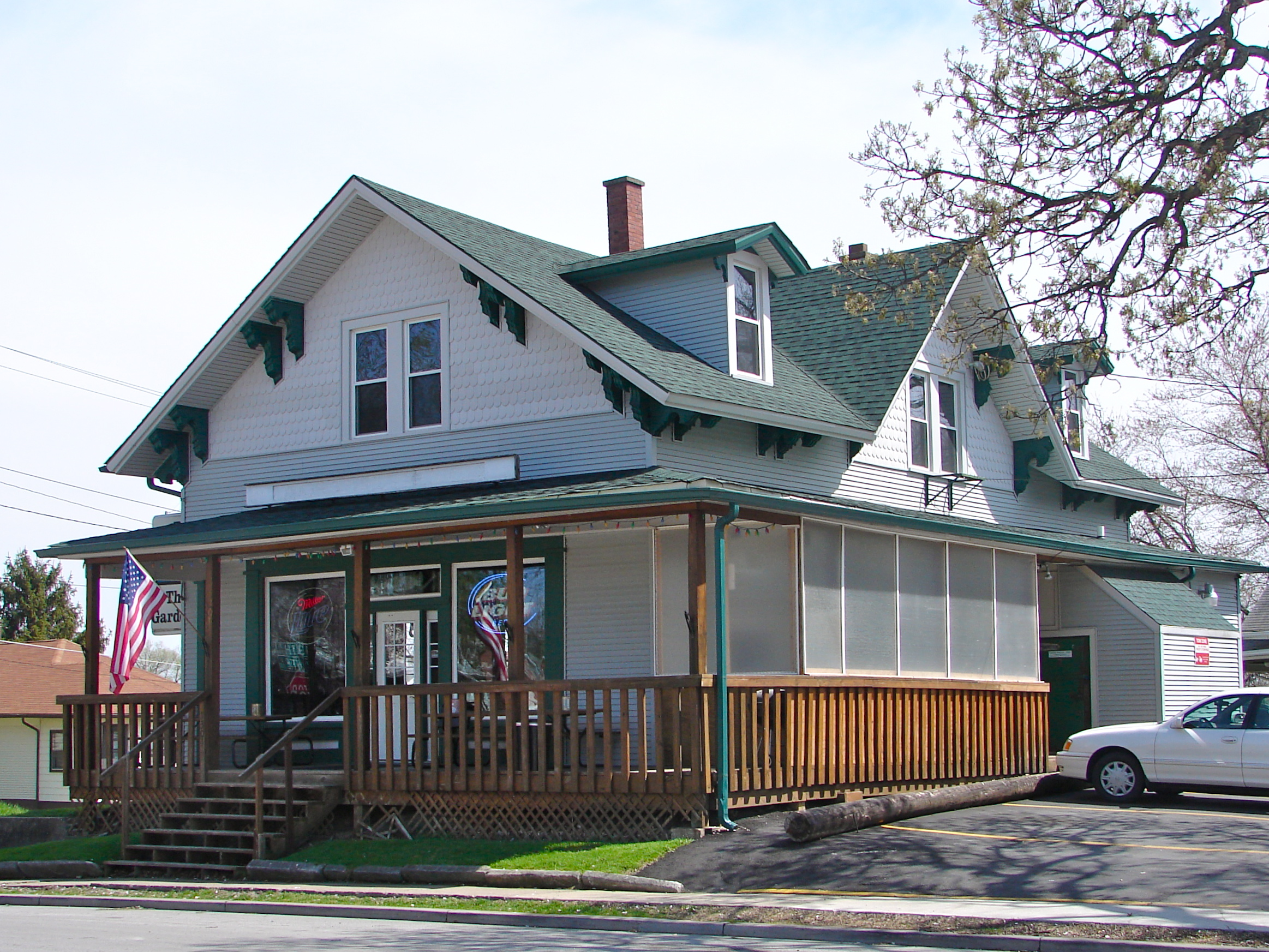

- Location within Iowa Location within the United States
- Location: 1301 W. 13th Street; Davenport, Iowa
- Coordinates: 41°31′57″N 90°35′40″W
- Area: less than one acre
- Built: 1885
- Architectural style: Italianate
- MPS: Davenport MRA
- NRHP reference No.: 84001585
- Added to NRHP: July 27, 1984

Washington Gardens is a historic building located in the West End of Davenport, Iowa, United States. It has been listed on the National Register of Historic Places since 1984.

== History ==
This combination tavern and residence was built by John Wiese in 1885. It is one of the oldest taverns in the city. Claus Gruneau bought it three years later from Wiese's widow, Sophie. He had previously operated the St. Louis House on Washington Square downtown. Adolph Herman "Audie" Brammann purchased is sometime later until his retirement in 1966. The facility originally combined a tavern, social hall and beer garden. It was a focal point for the local German community. The tavern itself was known alternately as Washington Park and Washington Gardens. The name came from the establishment's proximity to elaborately landscaped gardens used by the German community as beer gardens. The building continues to be used as a tavern.

== Architecture ==
The building is a commercial version of the Italianate style. The bracketed eaves in the gables are typical of the style. Originally the gables had round-arch windows that are associated with local German immigrants.

== See also ==
- National Register of Historic Places listings in west Davenport, Iowa
