= Henry P. Fennern House =

Historic house in Iowa, United States

- U.S. National Register of Historic Places
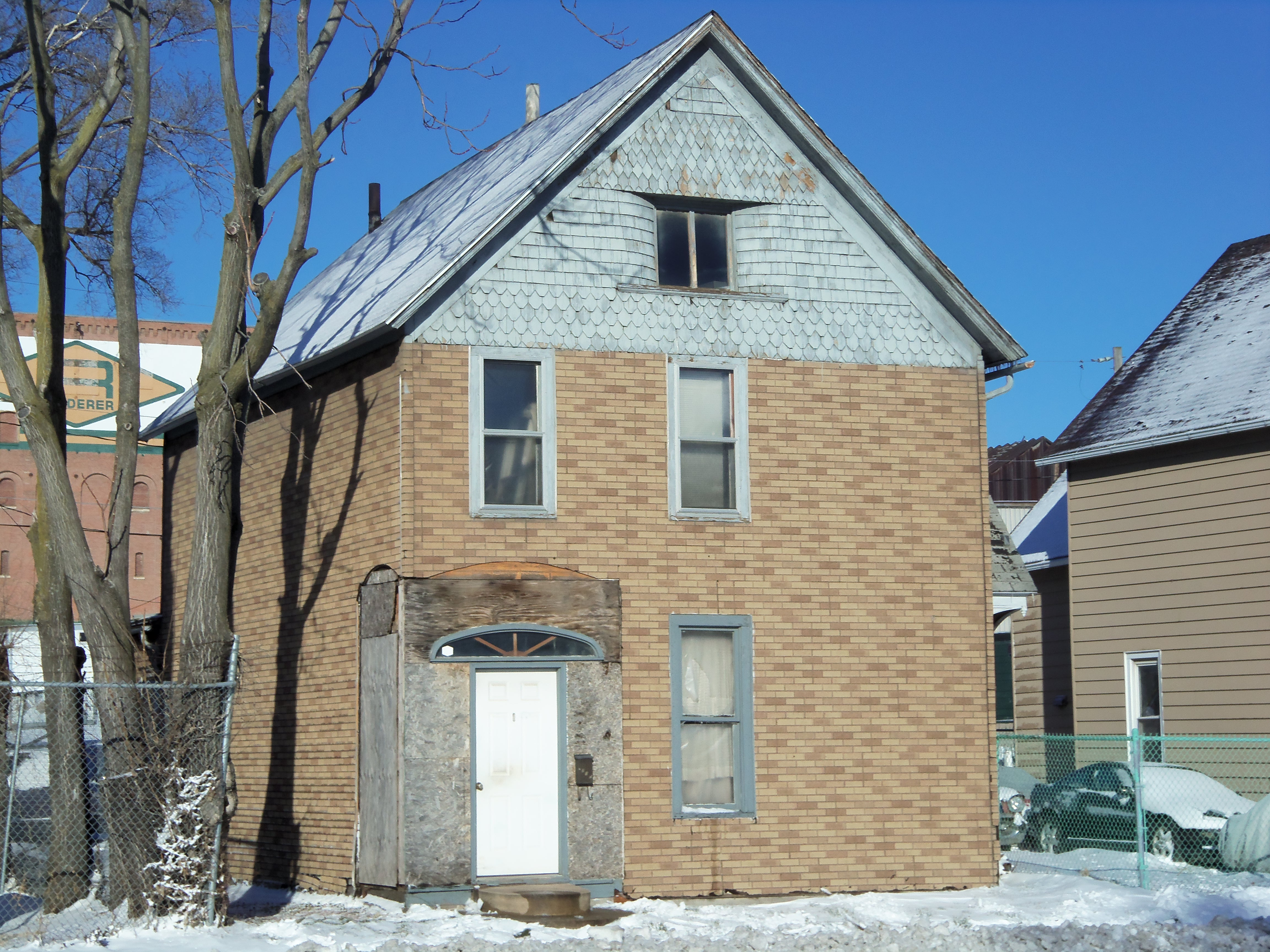

- Location within Iowa Location within the United States
- Location: 1332 W. 4th St; Davenport, Iowa
- Coordinates: 41°31′49″N 90°33′16″W
- Area: less than one are
- Built: 1902
- MPS: Davenport MRA
- NRHP reference No.: 84001405
- Added to NRHP: July 27, 1984

The Henry P. Fennern House is a historic building located in the West End of Davenport, Iowa, United States. This house dates from 1902 and was built by Henry P. Fennern, who had worked as a shipper for a local wholesale grocer, the J.F. Kelly Company. While the asbestos "brick" siding is not original, the decorative detail in the front gable is original to the house. It features three types of shingles and a small window set in curved reveals. This detail suggests Shingle style architecture. Another detail of the house, now missing, is the recessed, corner entrance with a spindle screen above. The house has been listed on the National Register of Historic Places since 1984.
