= House at 1646 W. Second Street =

Historic house in Iowa, United States

- U.S. National Register of Historic Places
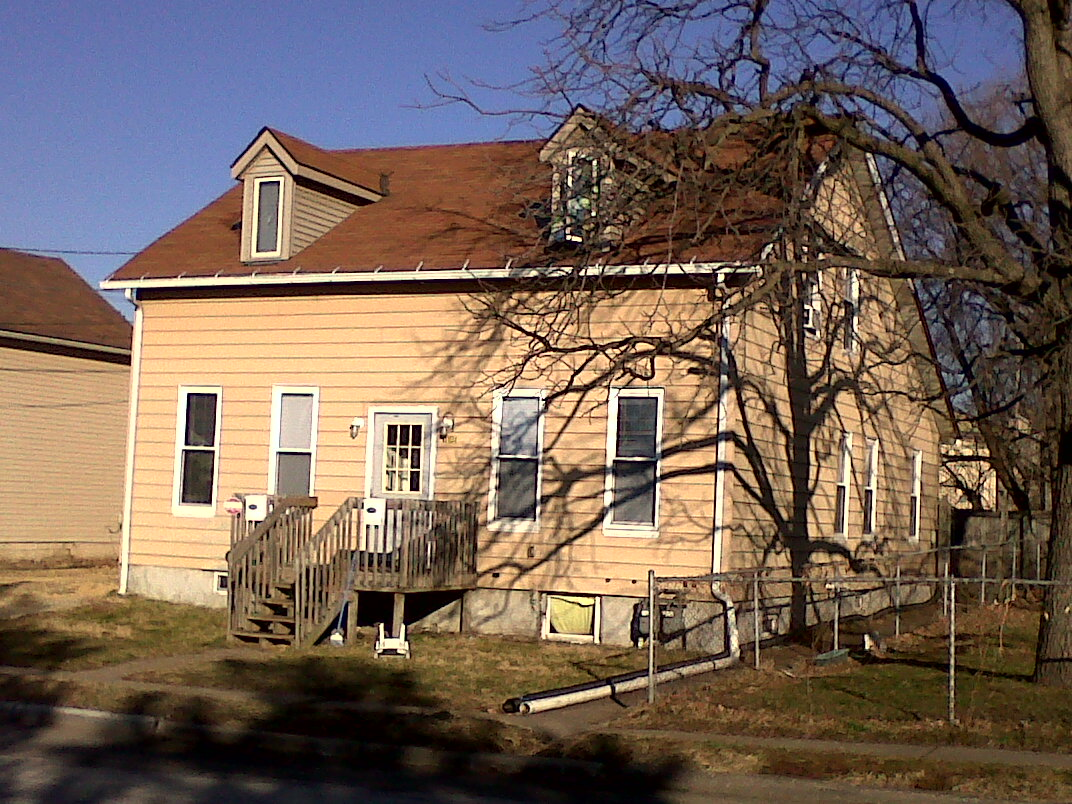

- Location within Iowa Location within the United States
- Location: 1646 W. 2nd St., Davenport, Iowa
- Coordinates: 41°31′15″N 90°36′35″W
- Built: c. 1865
- Architectural style: Saltbox
- MPS: Davenport MRA
- NRHP reference No.: 83002452
- Added to NRHP: July 7, 1983

The House at 1646 West Second Street is a historic building located in the West End of Davenport, Iowa, United States. The Saltbox-like style of this home, built in about 1865, has become rare in the city. The 1½-story frame structure features a five-bay wide symmetrical front. That symmetry and the placement of the two interior chimneys suggest influences of the Greek Revival style. The two dormers on the front roof and the porch are not original to the house. Early residents included Johann Putzier, sometime before 1884, and Sophie Sass and her descendants from 1885 to 1913. It was listed on the National Register of Historic Places in 1983.
