= Schroeder Bros. Meat Market =

- U.S. National Register of Historic Places
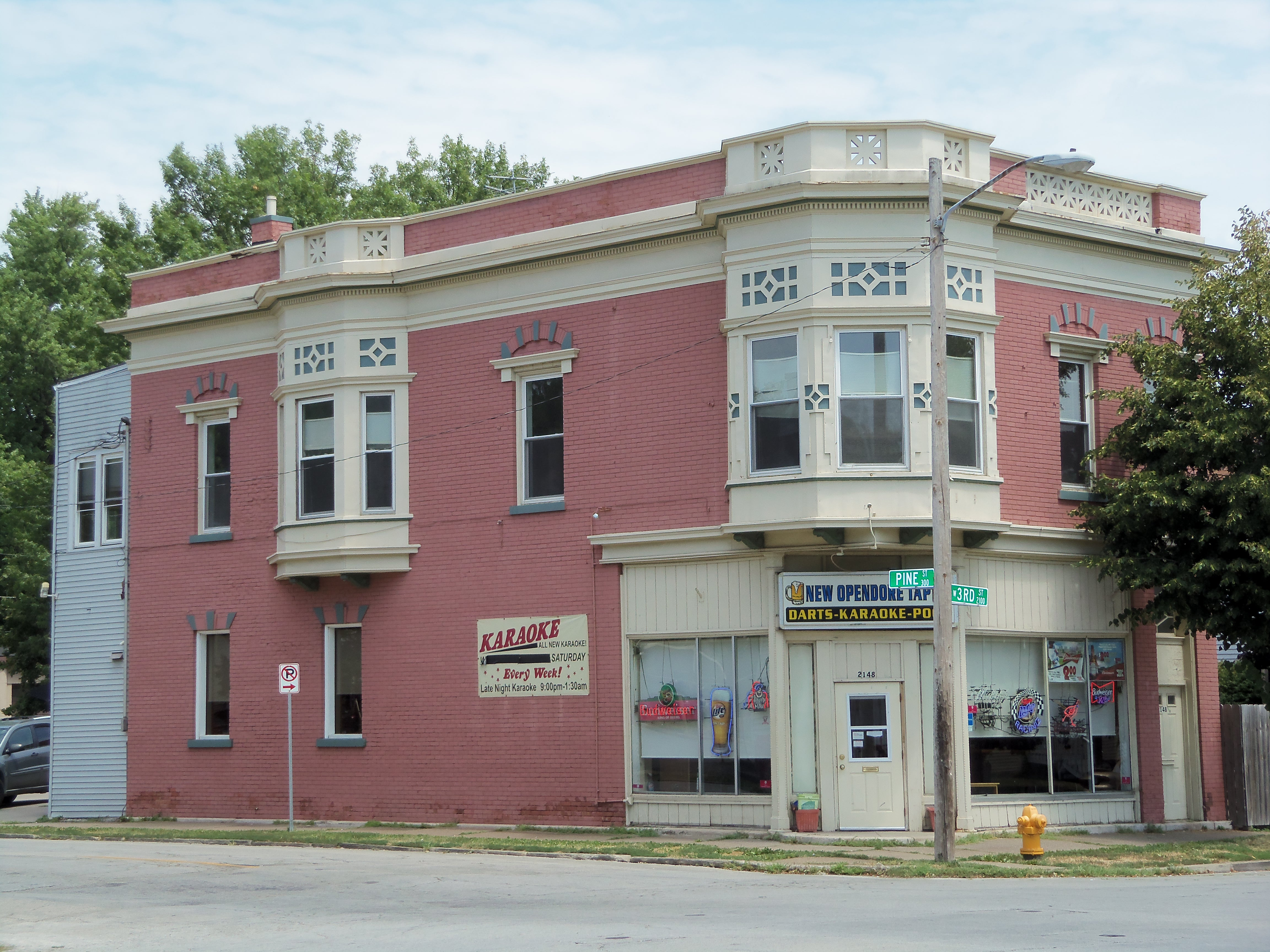

- Location within Iowa Location within the United States
- Location: 2146 W. 3rd Street; Davenport, Iowa
- Coordinates: 41°31′21″N 90°36′39″W
- Area: less than one acre
- Built: 1905
- Architectural style: Commercial Vernacular
- MPS: Davenport MRA
- NRHP reference No.: 83002501
- Added to NRHP: July 7, 1983

The Schroeder Bros. Meat Market is a historic building located in the West End of Davenport, Iowa, United States. The Commercial Vernacular style building was complete in 1905 and it has been listed on the National Register of Historic Places since 1983.

== History ==
The building was probably built for Henry and John Schroeder for their meat market. Another building that housed a cigar factory and residence occupied this property previously. Since at least the latter part of the 20th-century, the building has housed a tavern in the commercial space.

== Architecture ==
The building is a two-story brick structure that sits at the corner of West Third and North Pine Streets. The entrance into the first-floor commercial space faces the corner. Above the entrance is a pressed-metal oriel window, which gives the building a sense of prominence. Another oriel window is located further back along North Pine Street. The second floor also features rectangular windows with hoods above them. The building has a cornice across the top.
