= Lambert Tevoet House =

Historic house in Iowa, United States

- U.S. National Register of Historic Places
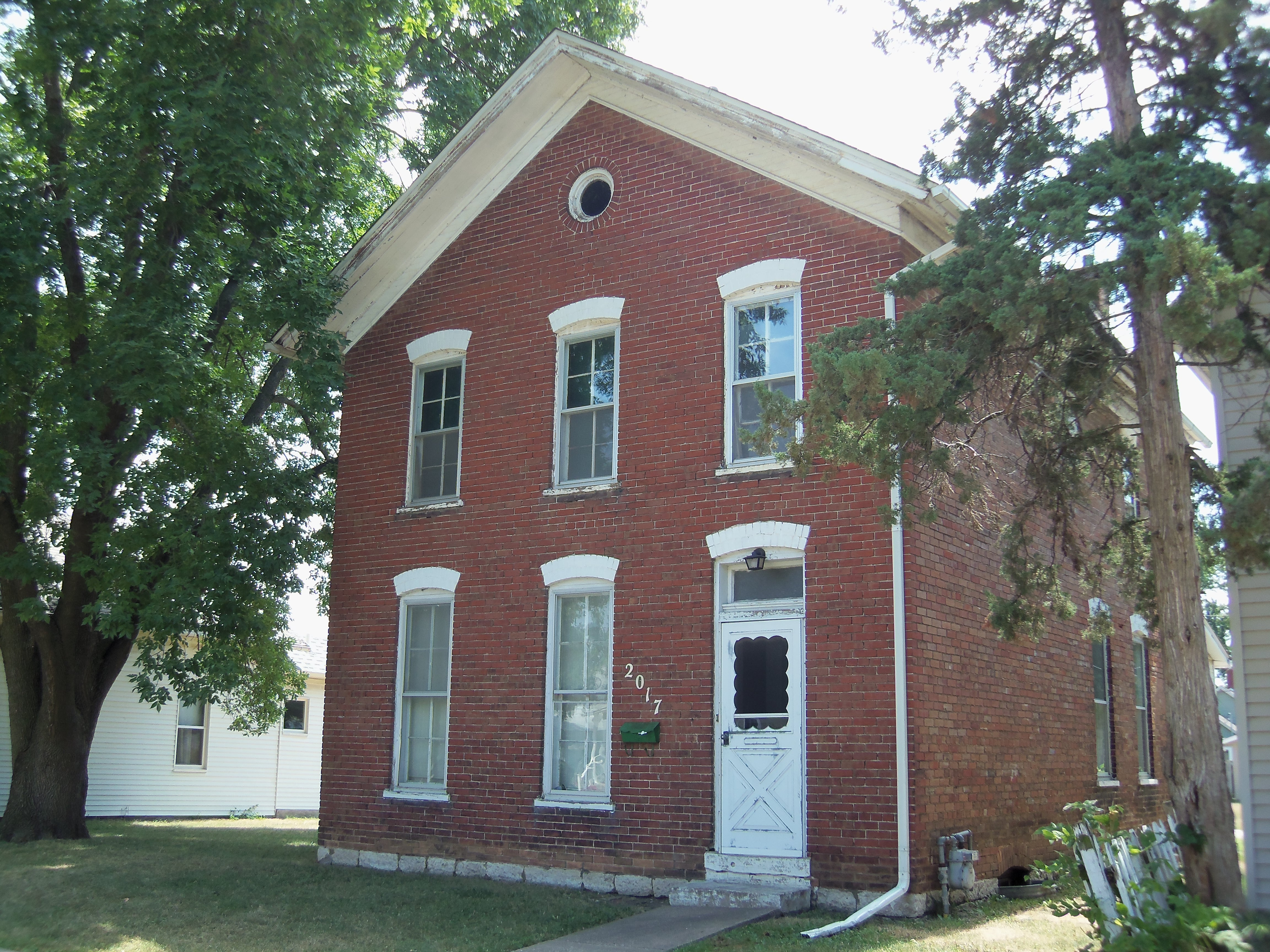

- Location within Iowa Location within the United States
- Location: 2017 W. 2nd St. Davenport, Iowa
- Coordinates: 41°31′16″N 90°36′29″W
- Area: less than one acre
- Built: 1870
- Architectural style: Greek Revival
- MPS: Davenport MRA
- NRHP reference No.: 83002518
- Added to NRHP: July 7, 1983

The Lambert Tevoet House is a historic building located in the West End of Davenport, Iowa, United States. Lambert Tevoet was a tailor who worked for Bartemeier and Geerts. He probably did not have the house built, but he was an early owner and lived here for many years. The house is an example of a popular form found in the city of Davenport: two-story, three-bay front gable, with an entrance off center and a small attic window below the roof peak. This house is built of brick and has little in the way of decoration. The house does feature simple window hoods and a transom over the front door. The style was popularized in Davenport by T.W. McClelland. The house has been listed on the National Register of Historic Places since 1983.
