= John W. Ballard House =

Historic house in Iowa, United States

- U.S. National Register of Historic Places
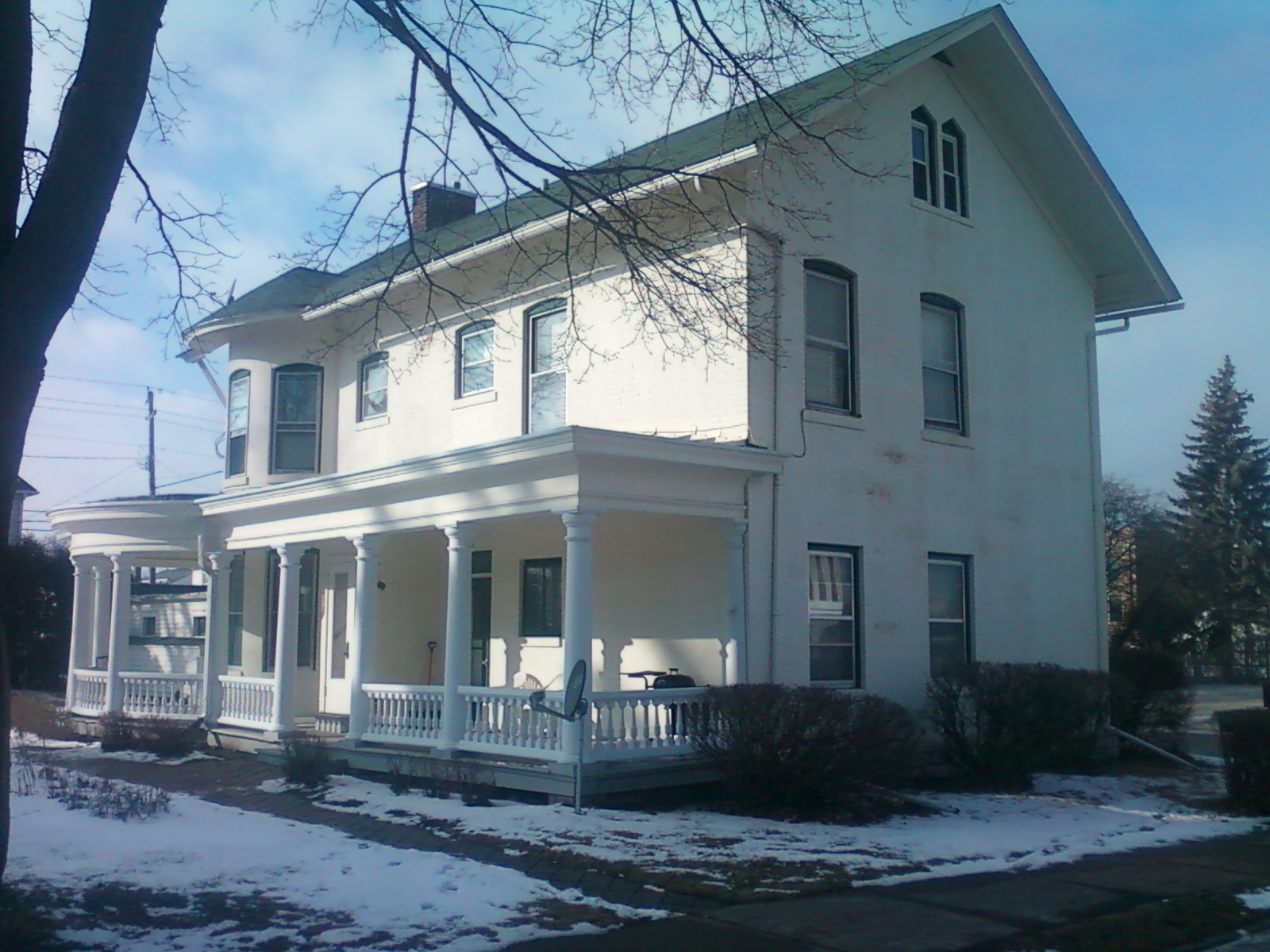

- Location within Iowa Location within the United States
- Location: 205 W. 16th St. Davenport, Iowa
- Coordinates: 41°32′8.53″N 90°34′33.14″W
- Area: less than one acre
- Built: 1871
- Architectural style: Late Victorian
- MPS: Davenport MRA
- NRHP reference No.: 83002398
- Added to NRHP: July 7, 1983

The John W. Ballard House is a historic building located in central Davenport, Iowa, United States. It has been listed on the National Register of Historic Places since 1983.

== History ==
John W. Ballard began living here in 1884, so he was probably not the person who had the house built. Ballard and his cousin, E.S. Ballord were partners in a pharmacy named E.S. Ballord & Co. In 1903 E.S. retired and John Ballard and his son continued the business as Ballard Drug & Dental Co.

== Architecture ==
Built in 1871, the home is one of the oldest surviving buildings in Davenport's upper Main Street area—if not the oldest. A Victorian Greek Revival design with turn-of-the-century neoclassical modifications, the house was reportedly "the most commanding structure in the neighborhood" at the time of construction. The main façade of the house faces a large yard to the south. It originally featured a single-story projecting window bay beside the main entrance. Sometime between 1892 and 1910 a two-story semi-circular bay and a porch that followed the bay was added. The two-story house is composed of brick and sits on a stone foundation. The addition is composed of wood construction.
