= Koch Drug Store =

- U.S. National Register of Historic Places
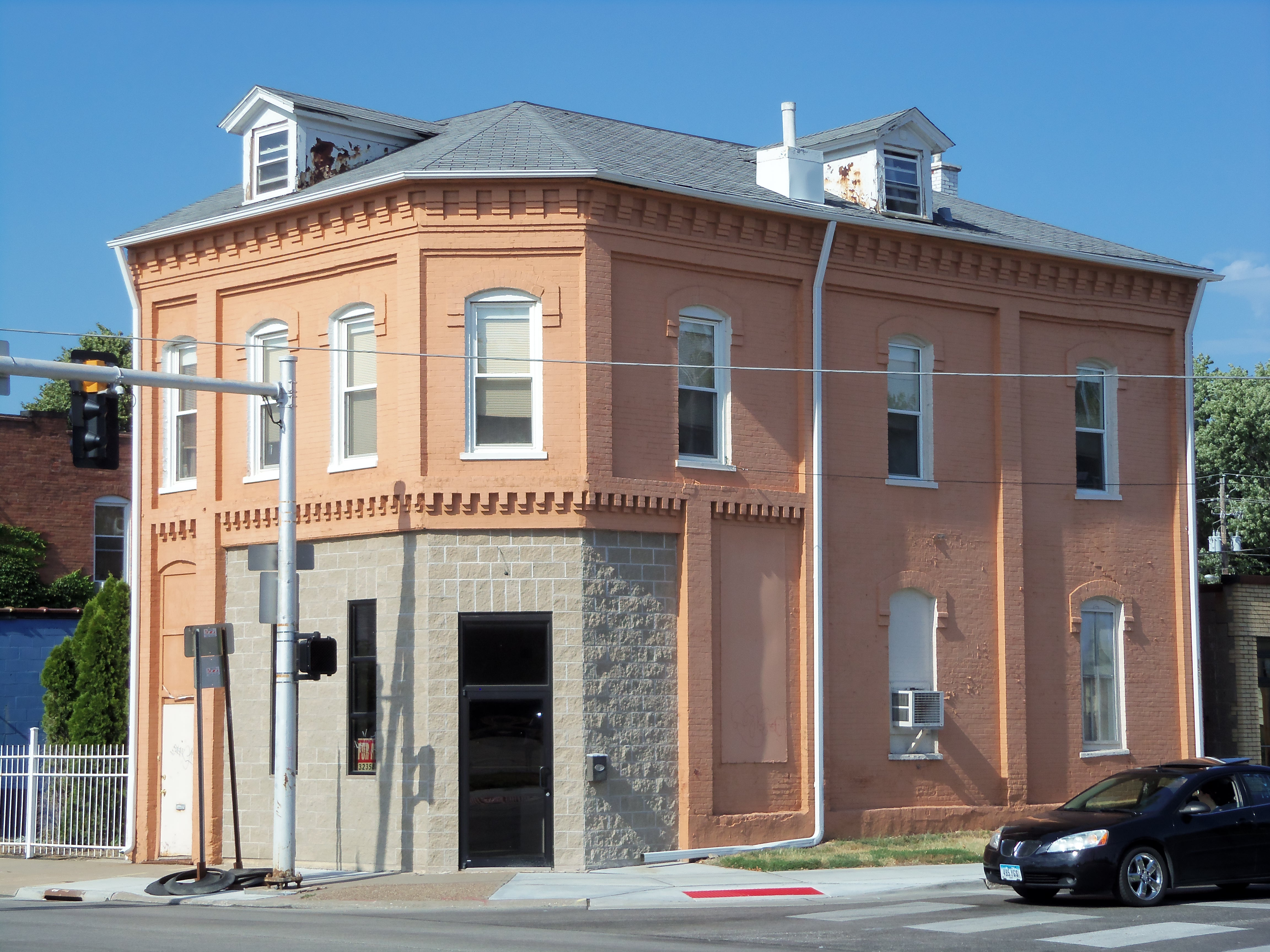

- Location within Iowa Location within the United States
- Location: 1501 Harrison St. Davenport, Iowa
- Coordinates: 41°31′21″N 90°35′24″W
- Area: less than one acre
- Built: 1881
- Architectural style: Late Victorian
- MPS: Davenport MRA
- NRHP reference No.: 84001457
- Added to NRHP: July 27, 1984

Koch Drug Store is a historic building located in the central part of Davenport, Iowa, United States. It is a Victorian style commercial building that was built in 1881. The structure was listed on the National Register of Historic Places in 1984.

== History ==
Francis J. Koch operated a pharmacy in this building beginning in 1881 and continued here for over a decade. Koch lived in the residential space upstairs. A pharmacy continued in occupation of the building until the 1920s, after which a variety of businesses were located there. After being vacant for at least five years, a bakery opened in 2014.

== Architecture ==
The two-story commercial and residential building occupies a corner lot on a main thoroughfare that leads to Davenport's Central Business District. It takes advantage of its location with two public façades and a chamfered corner, which is a common feature for corner commercial buildings in Davenport and across Iowa. The building also features a low hipped roof and dormers. The decorative elements are found in the pilasters and brick corbelling between floors at the corner and the west façade and at the cornice level. The storefront has been altered several times and has now been filled in.
