= Peters' Barber Shop =

- Peters’ Barber Shop
- U.S. National Register of Historic Places
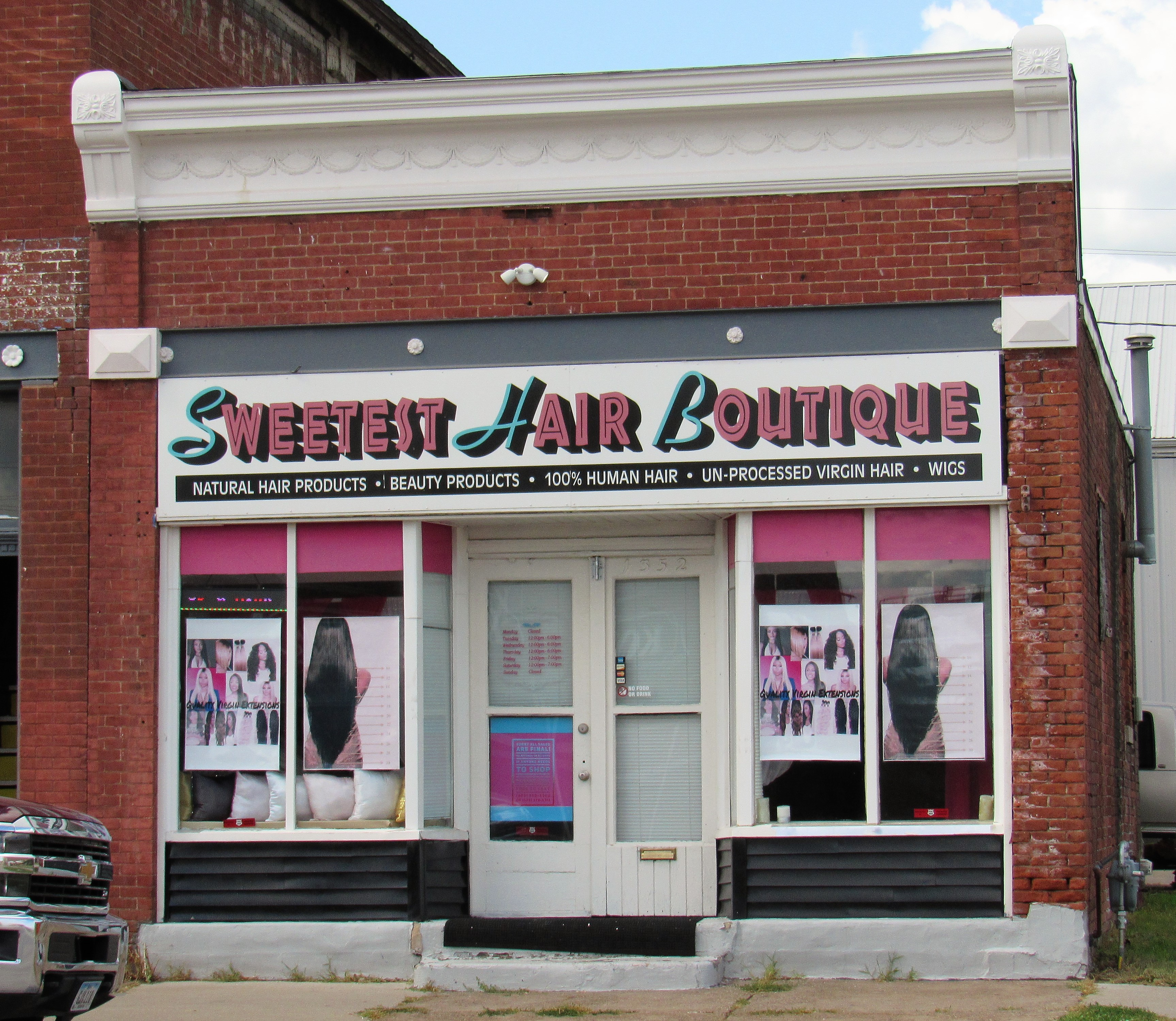

- Location within Iowa Location within the United States
- Location: 1352 W. 3rd St. Davenport, Iowa
- Coordinates: 41°31′57″N 90°35′36″W
- Area: less than one acre
- Built: 1905
- MPS: Davenport MRA
- NRHP reference No.: 84001498
- Added to NRHP: April 5, 1984

Peters’ Barber Shop is a historic building located in the West End of Davenport, Iowa, United States. It was completed in 1905 and it has been listed on the National Register of Historic Places since 1984.

== History ==
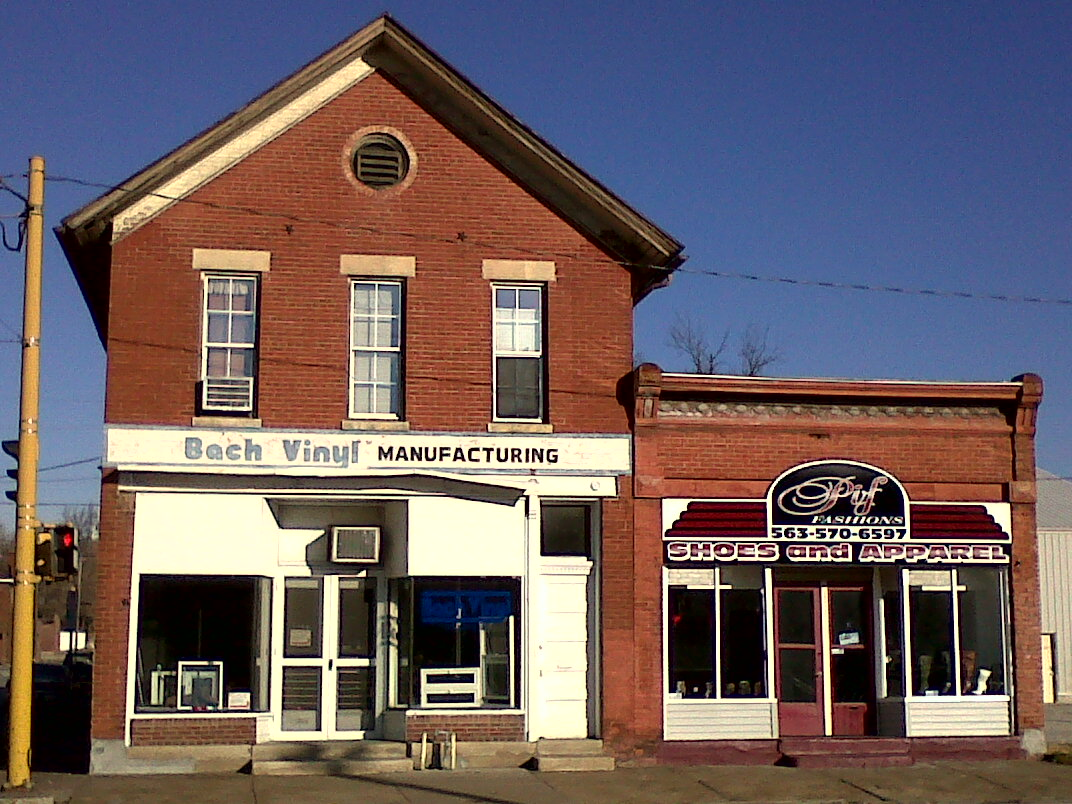
Peters’ Barber Shop (right) with the adjacent corner building.

The building was probably built by the owners of the building on the corner, which housed a meat market at the time. Adolph Peters began operating his barbershop in 1906. Others operated the same business in this building for many years before it housed other commercial interests.

== Architecture ==
The building is a single story brick structure that sits adjacent to a two-story building on the northeast corner of West Third and Fillmore Streets. It is part of a small commercial district near the historic German neighborhoods and the industrial areas along the Mississippi River. The building features a basic storefront with double doors flanked by two sets of windows and a simple cornice across the top of the façade. It is typical of small-scale, turn of the century, commercial architecture found in many Iowa communities.
