= Richard Benton House =

Historic house in Iowa, United States

- U.S. National Register of Historic Places
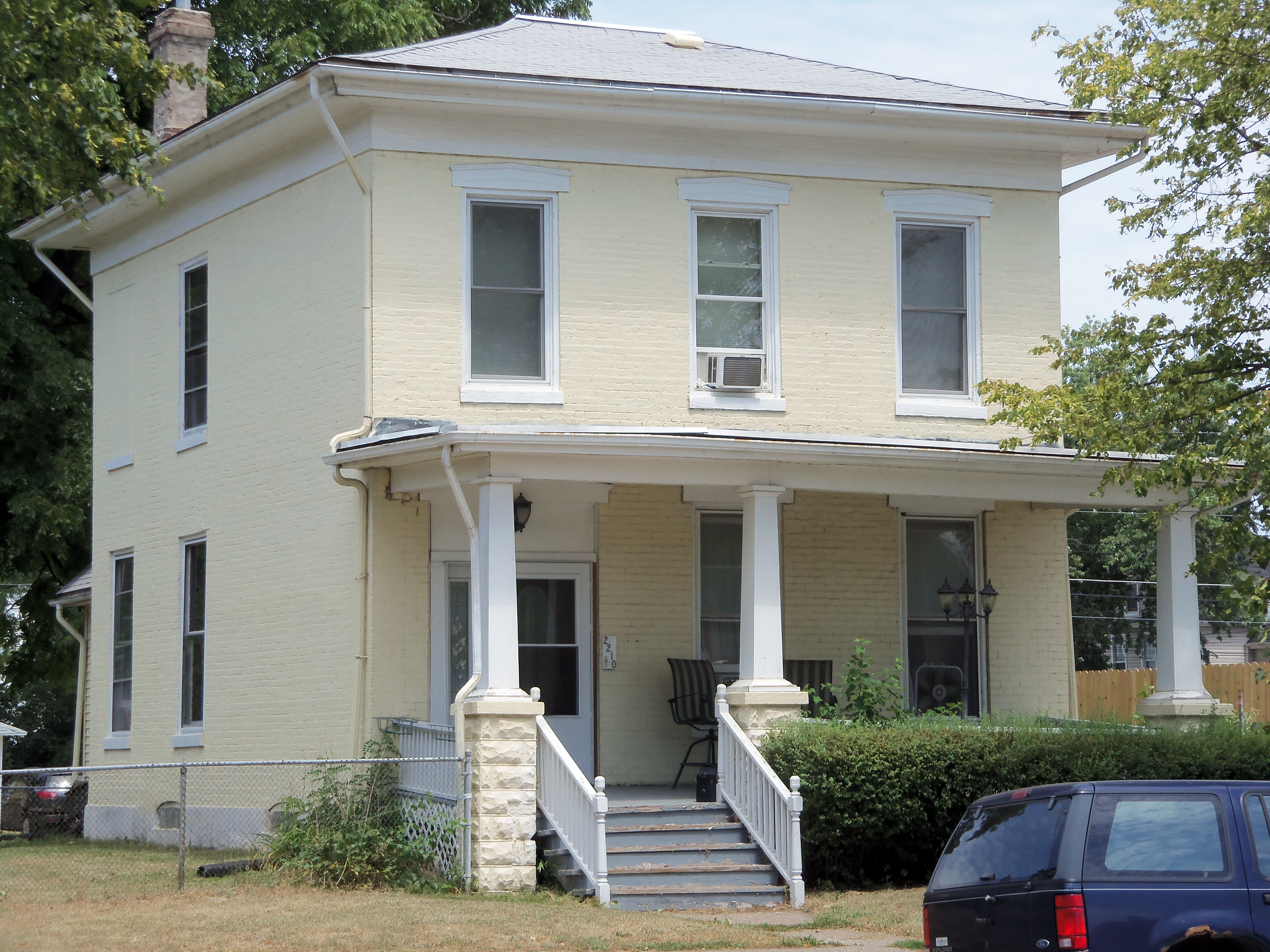

- Location within Iowa Location within the United States
- Location: 2204 and 2210 W. 3rd St. Davenport, Iowa
- Coordinates: 41°31′22″N 90°34′36″W
- Area: less than one acre
- Built: 1855
- Architectural style: Italianate; Greek Revival
- MPS: Davenport MRA
- NRHP reference No.: 83002399
- Added to NRHP: July 7, 1983

The Richard Benton House is a historic building located in the West End of Davenport, Iowa, United States. The combination Italianate and Greek Revival house was typical of Davenport's pre-Civil War architecture. The earliest known occupant of the house was Richard Benton who lived here from about 1872 to 1895. Benton owned a livery and stable. Eventually his son Charles joined him in the business. The residence has been listed on the National Register of Historic Places since 1983.
