= D. Julius Gaspard House =

Historic house in Iowa, United States

- U.S. National Register of Historic Places
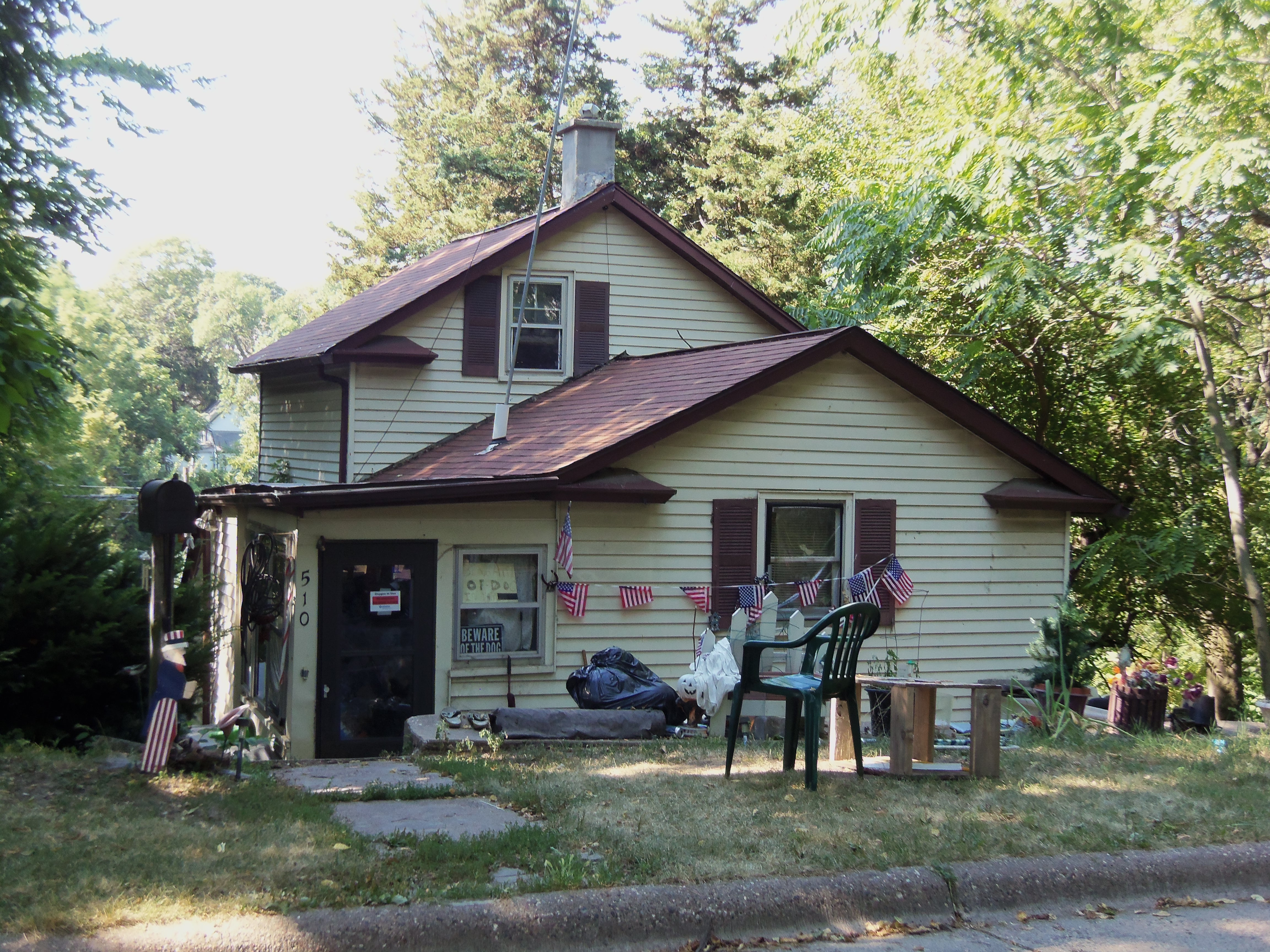

- Location within Iowa Location within the United States
- Location: 510 W. 10½ St. Davenport, Iowa
- Coordinates: 41°31′49″N 90°34′45″W
- Area: less than one acre
- Built: 1880
- Architectural style: Greek Revival
- MPS: Davenport MRA
- NRHP reference No.: 83002437
- Added to NRHP: July 7, 1983

The D. Julius Gaspard House is a historic building located on the hill above downtown Davenport, Iowa, United States. The two-story, Vernacular Greek Revival residence was built into a steep, sloping lot. The narrow two-bay front has its main staircase in a separate enclosed structure on the east side of the house. It is only one of a few examples of this kind of structure in Iowa. The house was built by D. Julius Gaspard, who worked as a stonemason. It has been listed on the National Register of Historic Places since 1983.
