= Henry Pohlmann House =

Historic house in Iowa, United States

- U.S. National Register of Historic Places
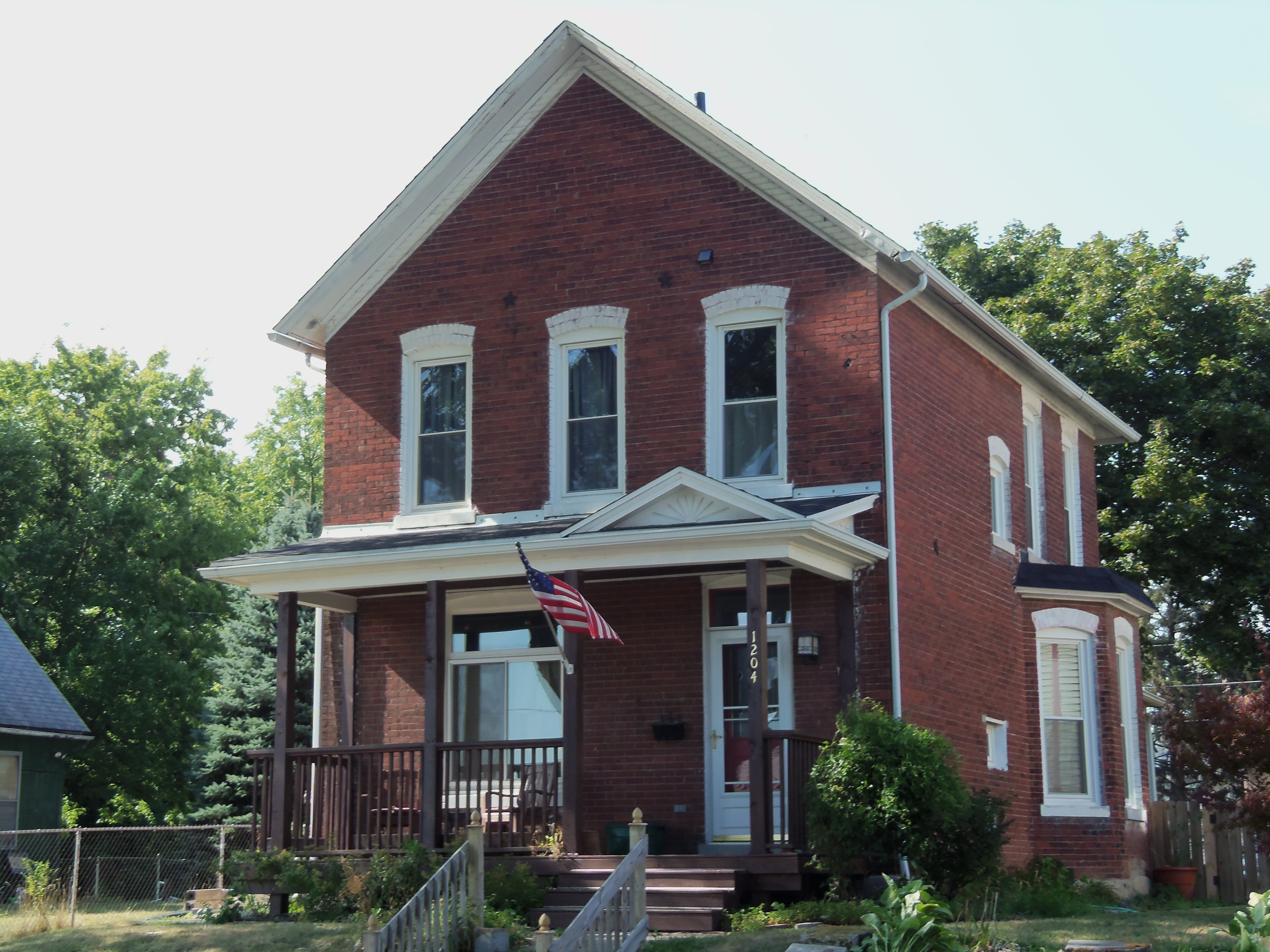

- Location within Iowa Location within the United States
- Location: 1204 W. 13th St. Davenport, Iowa
- Coordinates: 41°31′59″N 90°35′26″W
- Area: less than one acre
- Built: 1885
- MPS: Davenport MRA
- NRHP reference No.: 84001520
- Added to NRHP: July 27, 1984

The Henry Pohlmann House is a historic building located in the West End of Davenport, Iowa, United States. Henry Pohlmann was a brick manufacturer who worked for his family firm of H.B. Pohlmann. The two-story brick house is a McClelland front gable that is a popular 19th-century vernacular architectural style in Davenport. The three-bay front has an off-centered main entrance and there is a polygonal window bay on the east side of the house. The house has been listed on the National Register of Historic Places since 1984.
