= Marie Clare Dessaint House =

Historic house in Iowa, United States

- U.S. National Register of Historic Places
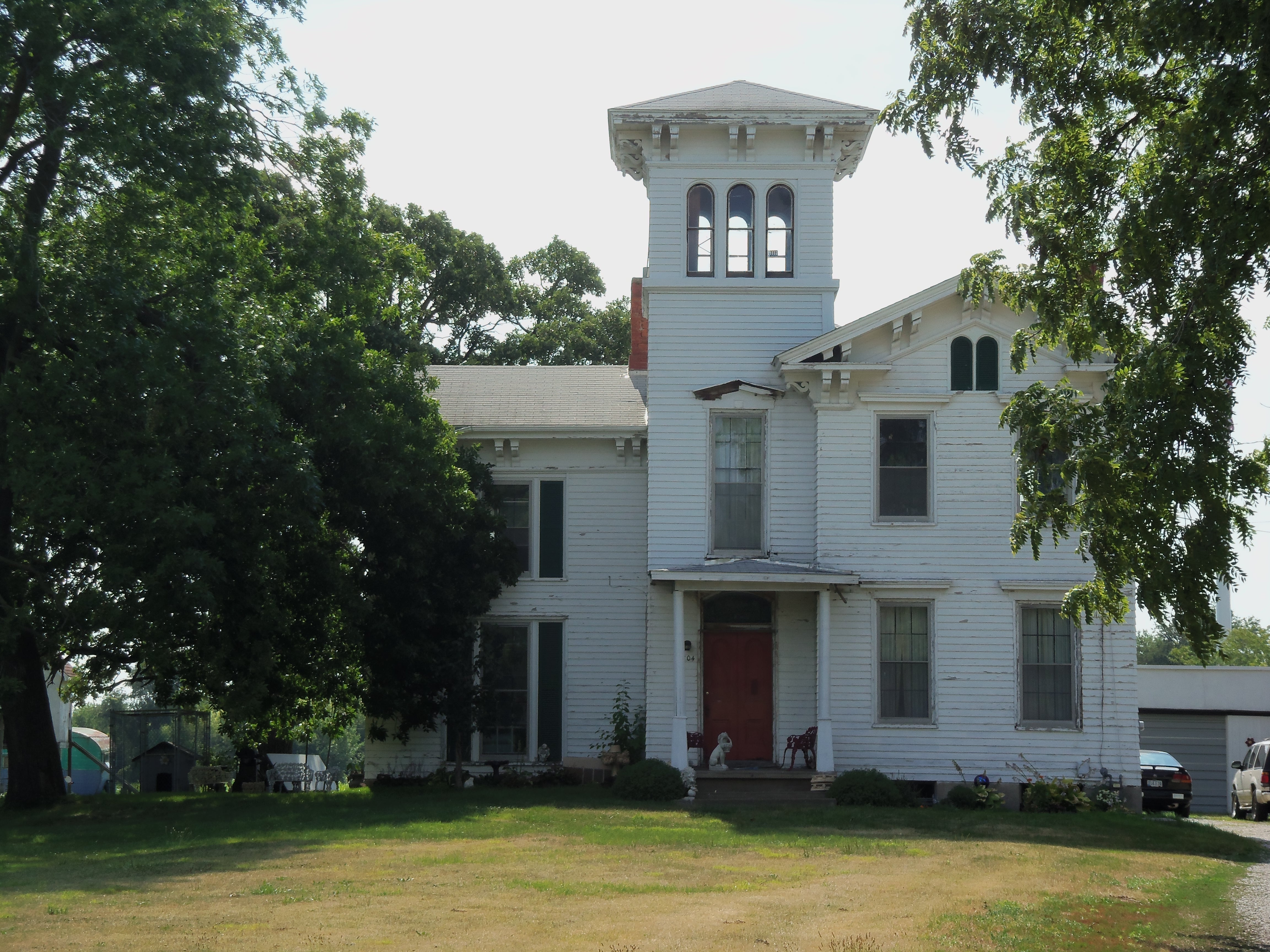

- Location within Iowa Location within the United States
- Location: 4808 Northwest Blvd. Davenport, Iowa
- Coordinates: 41°34′11″N 90°35′13″W
- Area: less than one acre
- Built: 1865-1870
- Architectural style: Italian Villa
- MPS: Davenport MRA
- NRHP reference No.: 84000300
- Added to NRHP: November 1, 1984

The Marie Clare Dessaint House is a historic building located on the northwest side of Davenport, Iowa, United States. The residence has been listed on the National Register of Historic Places since 1984.

== History ==
Marie Clare Dessaint had this built on the 143-acre (58 ha) property that she owned along what was then known as Allens Grove Road. The Dessaint family was engaged in the lumber milling business in Davenport. After Dessaint, the house passed to several other people, including Peter Kerker who owned the property from around 1871 to 1890. Simon Seng bought it in 1905 and the Seng family has owned it ever since. The house remains on an open lot in a semi-rural part of the city, but newer residential development has been built close by.

== Architecture ==
The house is considered one of the finest examples of the Italian Villa style in Davenport. The two-story, frame house follows a gable-roofed L-plan. A three-stage entrance tower rises from the angle. The house features large paired rolled brackets and architrave molding ornamentation on the broad cornice. The windows in the south wing of the house are flanked by recessed panels, which contain shutters that are flush with the wall surface. The front gable contains two small round-arched windows. The third stage of the tower has three round-arched windows on all four sides. The rectangular windows are topped with molded cornices. There is a 1½-story, gable-roofed, kitchen wing attached to the back of the house. The front porch and stoop are not original to the house.
