= Cottage at 1514 and 1516 W. Second Street =

Historic house in Iowa, United States

- Cottage at 1514 and 1516 W. Second St.
- U.S. National Register of Historic Places
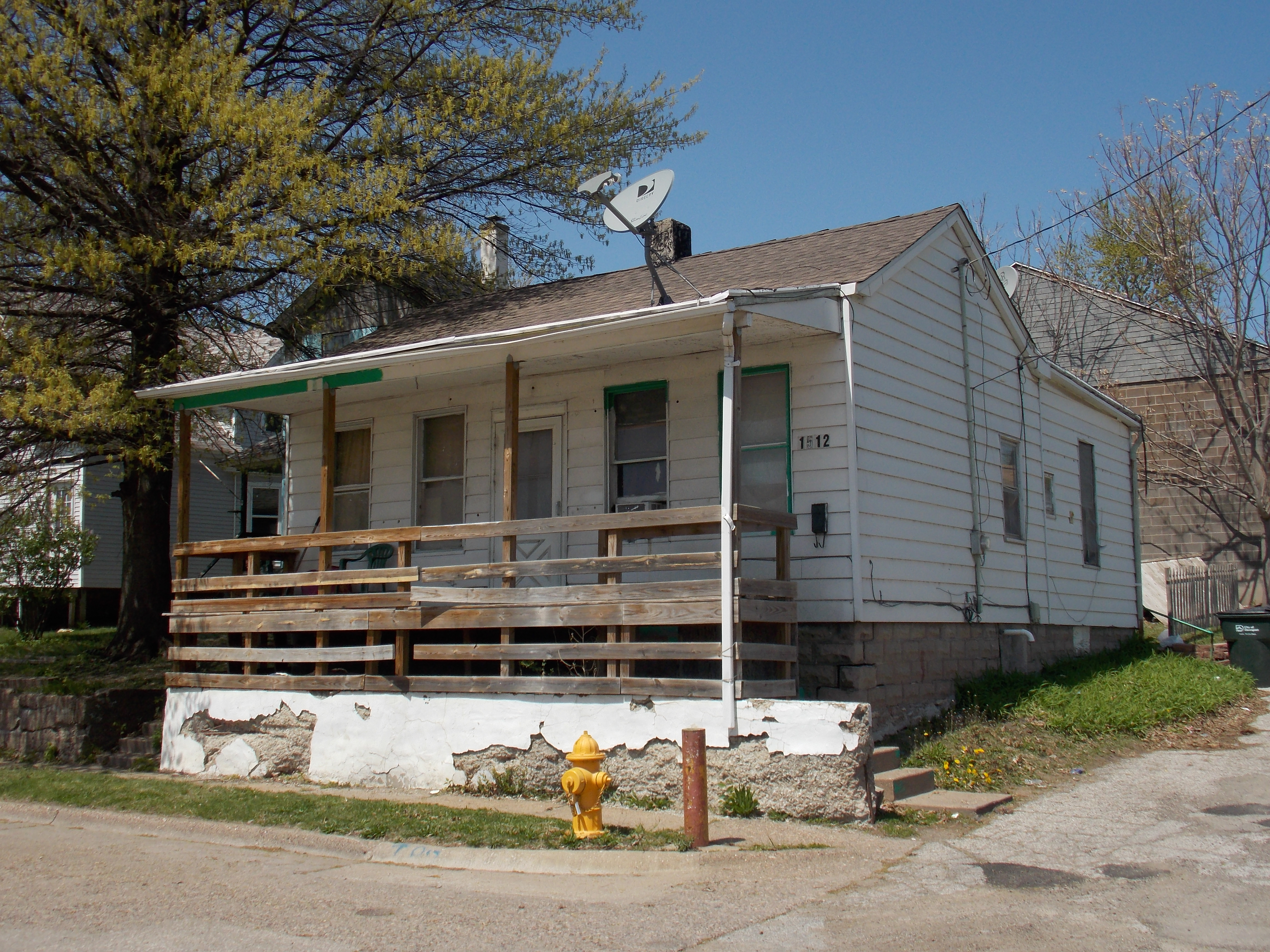

- Location within Iowa Location within the United States
- Location: 1514-1516 W. 2nd St., Davenport, Iowa
- Coordinates: 41°31′17.04″N 90°35′50.89″W
- Area: less than one acre
- Built: c. 1850
- MPS: Davenport MRA
- NRHP reference No.: 83002416
- Added to NRHP: July 7, 1983

The Cottage at 1514 and 1516 West Second Street is a historic building located in a residential-light industrial area of the West End of Davenport, Iowa, United States. Philippe Oszuscik in his 1979 study of Davenport architecture identified this small cottage as one of the earliest house types in the city. It features a full size front porch that was taken from the Galerie of Mississippi Valley French tradition and a symmetrical, 5-bay main facade that reflects the Georgian and Greek Revival styles. The present porch, however, is not original to the house. The side gable, single-story frame house is built on a stone foundation and has an extension off of the back. The cottage was listed on the National Register of Historic Places in 1983.
