= John Lueschen House =

Historic house in Iowa, United States

- U.S. National Register of Historic Places
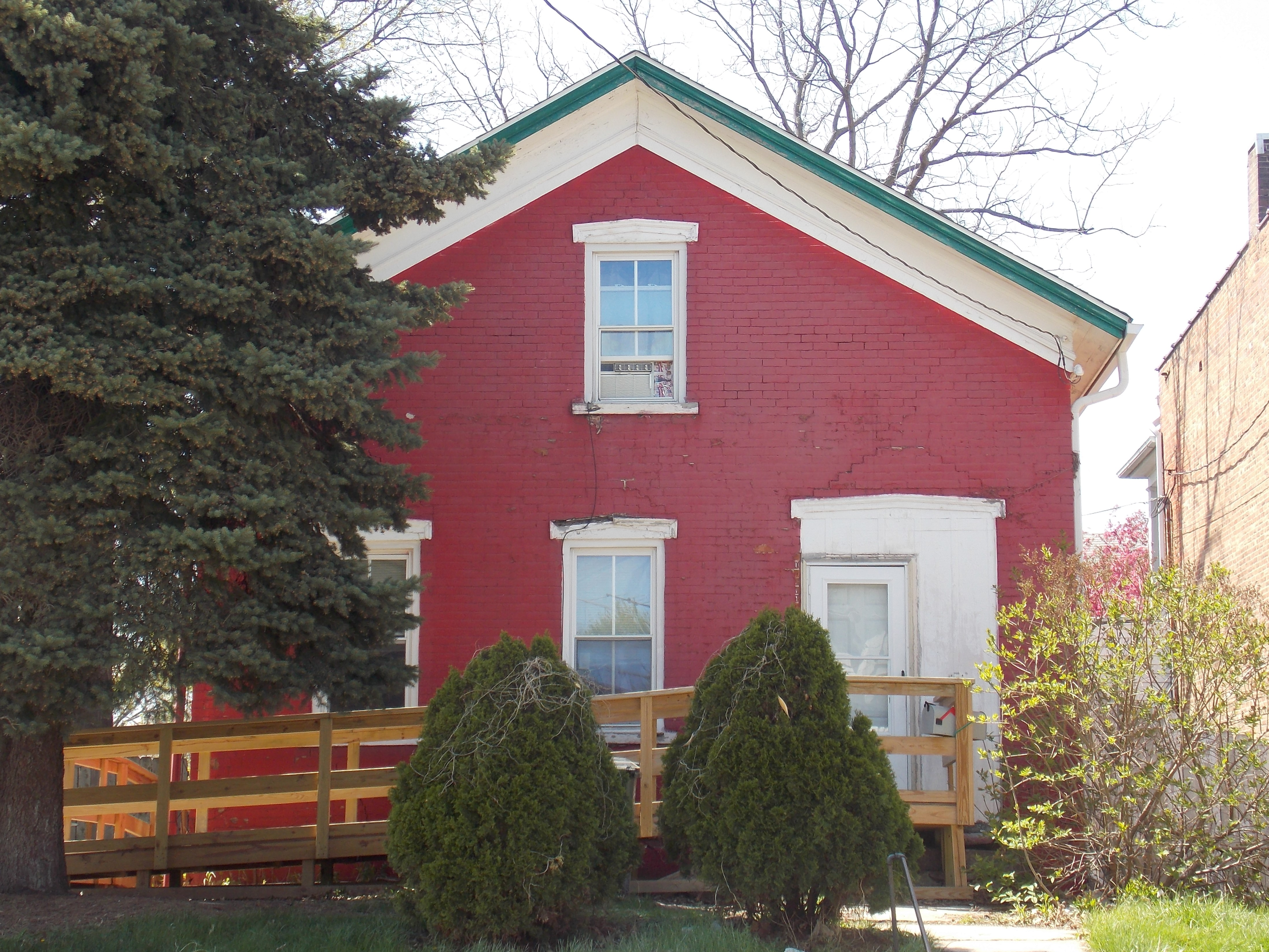

- Location within Iowa Location within the United States
- Location: 1628-1632 Washington St., Davenport, Iowa
- Coordinates: 41°32′11″N 90°35′47″W
- Area: less than one acre
- Built: 1865
- Architectural style: Greek Revival
- MPS: Davenport MRA
- NRHP reference No.: 84001468
- Added to NRHP: July 27, 1984

The John Lueschen House is a historic building located in the West End of Davenport, Iowa, United States. It is located in what was historically a German ethnic neighborhood. Little is known of the early inhabitants of the house, however, John Lueschen, a butcher who owned a meat market on Washington Street, lived here in the late 19th century. The small Greek Revival style residence features a simple design with shallow triangular window heads and a broad molded cornice frieze. The house has been listed on the National Register of Historic Places since 1984.
