= Werthman Grocery =

- U.S. National Register of Historic Places
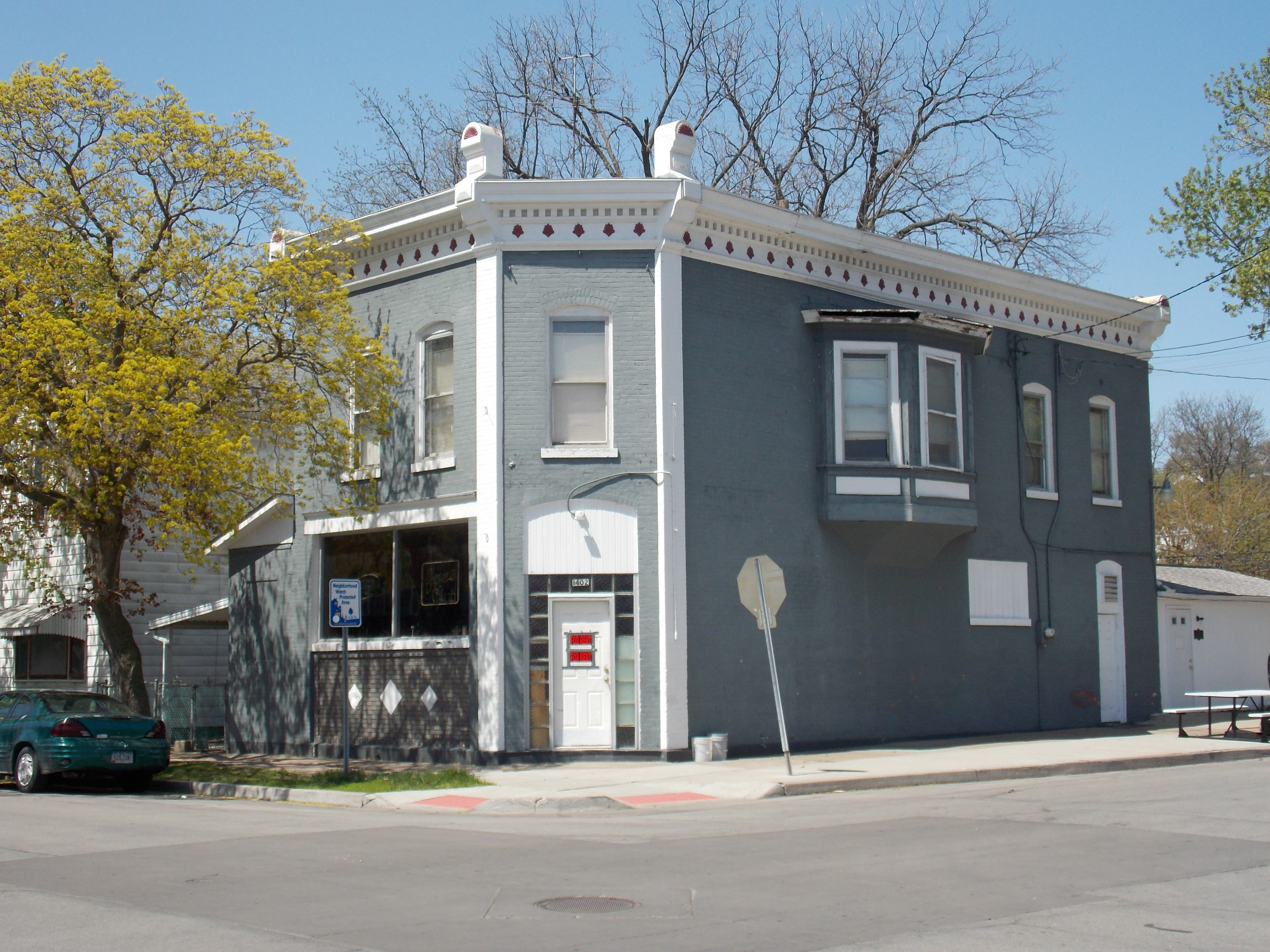

- Location within Iowa Location within the United States
- Location: 1402 W. 7th St. Davenport, Iowa
- Coordinates: 41°31′36.85″N 90°35′40.2″W
- Area: less than one acre
- Built: 1900
- MPS: Davenport MRA
- NRHP reference No.: 84001588
- Added to NRHP: July 27, 1984

Werthman Grocery is located at a commercial intersection in a residential neighborhood in the West End of Davenport, Iowa, United States. While it initially housed a grocery store, the building has been a long time neighborhood tavern. It was listed on the National Register of Historic Places in 1984.

== History ==
Henry Werthman opened a grocery store in this building in 1900. Several other members of the Werthman family lived within the one-block area in the early 20th-century. A tavern opened in the building by 1910. It was operated by John J. Bryson who lived in the second-floor apartment. A tavern has been housed here since that time, even during the Prohibition era. In those years it was listed in city directories as selling only "soft drinks".

== Architecture ==
The neighborhood tavern was and is a fixture in what was a predominantly working-class German neighborhood of Davenport. This two-story commercial building capitalizes on its corner location by way of the building's main entrance that was placed in a chamfered corner. The oriel window on the east side indicates the location of the residential space above the tavern, which was a common feature in many of Davenport's small commercial buildings from the 19th and early 20th century. The structure is composed of brick, built on a stone foundation. Its primary decorative feature is the metal cornice, with dentil molding, finials, and ornamental frieze.
