= Richard Schebler House =

Historic house in Iowa, United States

- U.S. National Register of Historic Places
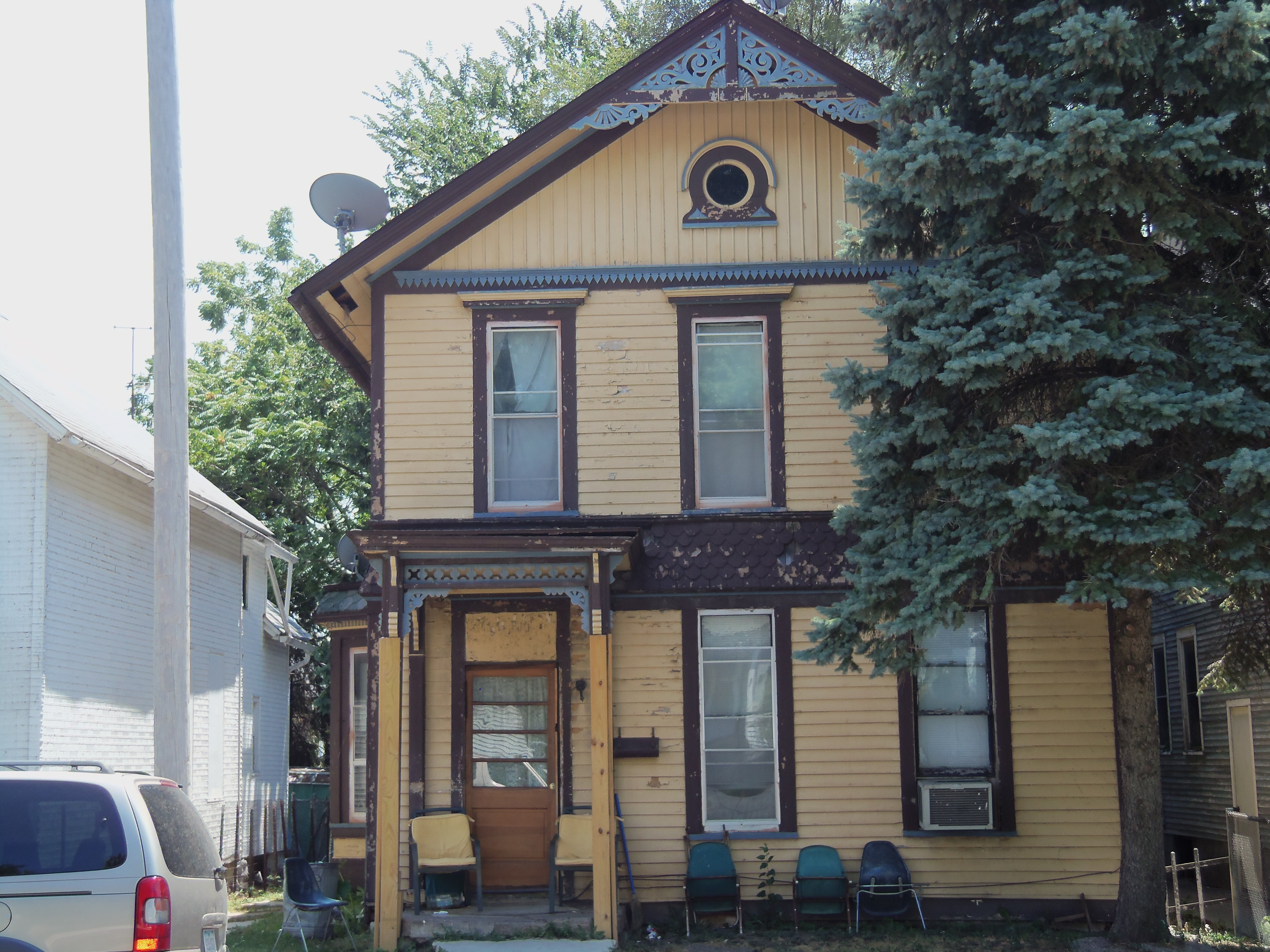

- Location within Iowa Location within the United States
- Location: 1217 W. 7th St. Davenport, Iowa
- Coordinates: 41°31′35″N 90°35′28″W
- Area: less than one acre
- Built: 1876
- MPS: Davenport MRA
- NRHP reference No.: 83002496
- Added to NRHP: July 7, 1983

The Richard Schebler House is a historic building located in the West End of Davenport, Iowa, United States. Richard Schebler, who built this house in 1876, was a grain buyer. Before living here he had lived elsewhere in the neighborhood. The house is an example of a popular form found in the city of Davenport: two-story, three–bay front gable, with an entrance off center and a small attic window below the roof peak. This house is also of wood construction, which allows for more elaboration. Here it is seen in the wall shingles, the small columned porch, and the surround of the attic window. Above the gable window is an intricately carved apron. Surrounding the entrance is an Eastlake-style porch. It has been listed on the National Register of Historic Places since 1983.
