= Theodore Jansen House =

Historic house in Iowa, United States

- U.S. National Register of Historic Places
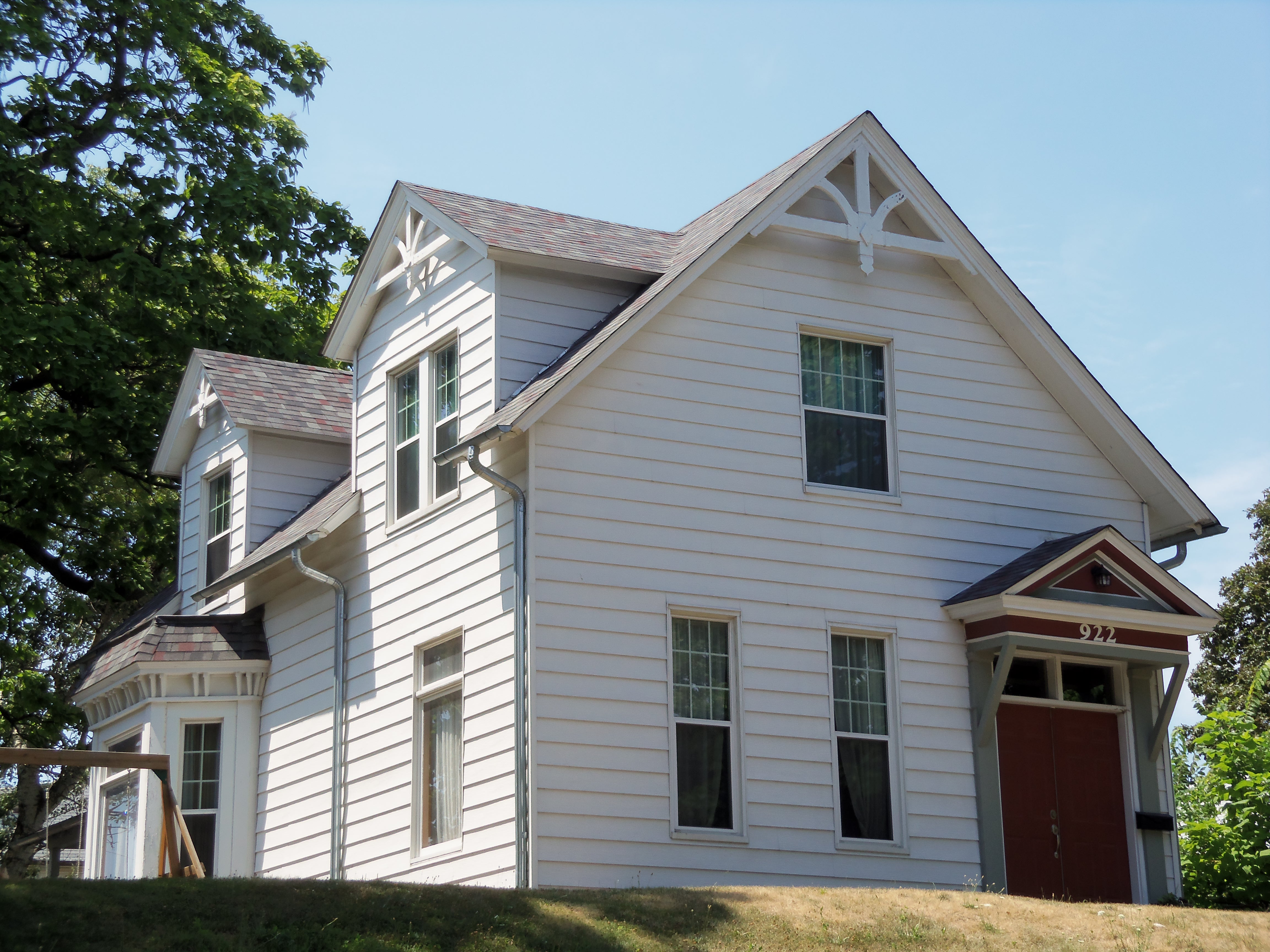

- Location within Iowa Location within the United States
- Location: 922 Myrtle St. Davenport, Iowa
- Coordinates: 41°31′46″N 90°35′21″W
- Area: less than one acre
- Built: 1888
- Architectural style: Queen Anne
- MPS: Davenport MRA
- NRHP reference No.: 83002455
- Added to NRHP: July 7, 1983

The Theodore Jansen House is a historic building located in the West End of Davenport, Iowa, United States. At the time this house was built in 1888, Theodore Jansen worked at American Hose Manufacturing Company as a blacksmith. In 1890 he started working for a carriage manufacturer, Young, Harford and Company. The Vernacular Queen Anne style residence is a 1½-story, front gable cottage with large wall dormers and a wing off the back. It features stickwork aprons on the main and the dormer gables. There is also a bracketed polygonal window bay on the first floor. It has been listed on the National Register of Historic Places since 1983.
