= Henry Ebeling House =

Historic house in Iowa, United States

- U.S. National Register of Historic Places
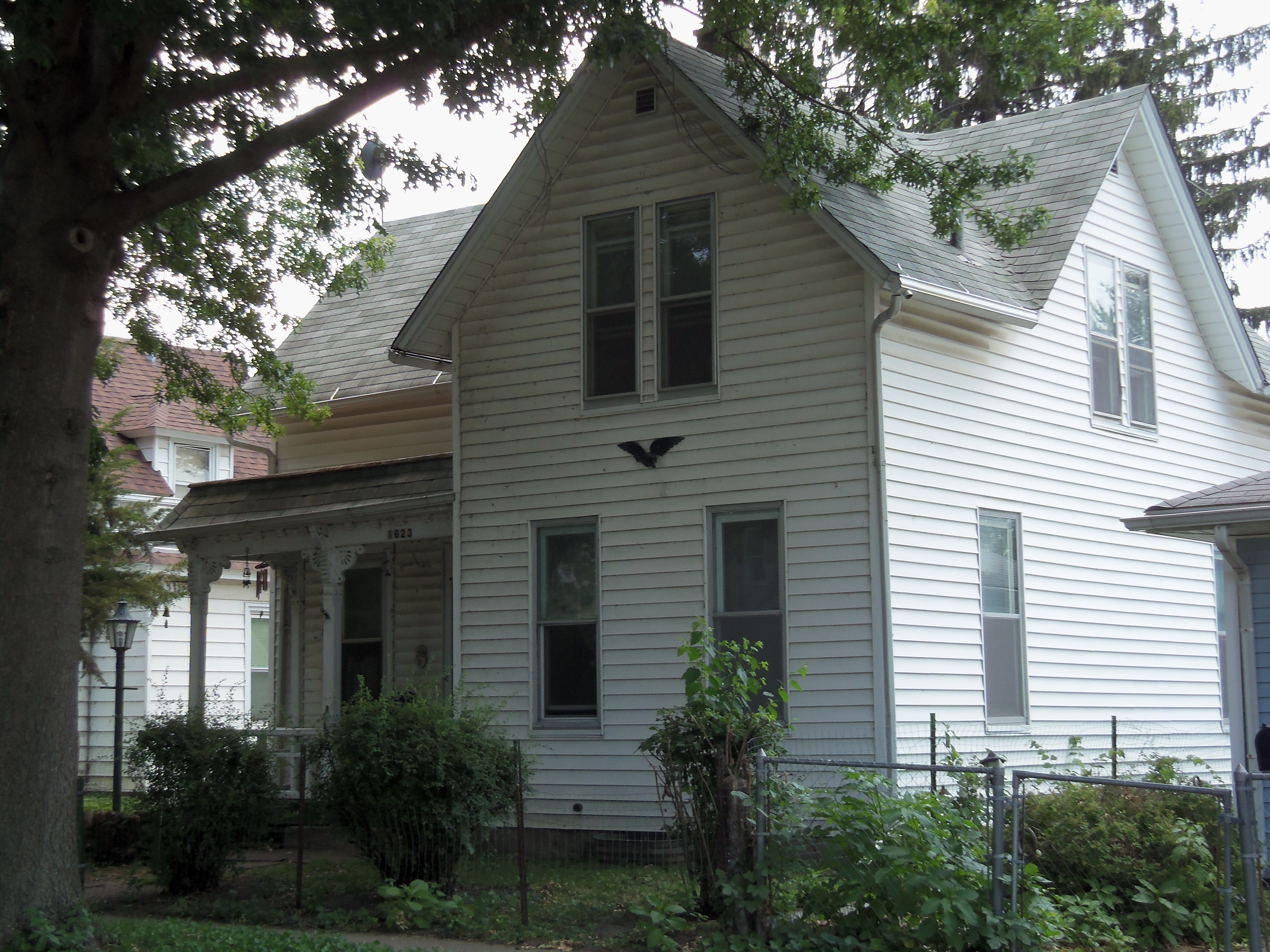

- Location within Iowa Location within the United States
- Location: 1623 W. 6th St. Davenport, Iowa
- Coordinates: 41°31′21″N 90°34′1″W
- Area: less than one acre
- Built: 1888
- Architectural style: Late Victorian
- MPS: Davenport MRA
- NRHP reference No.: 84001399
- Added to NRHP: July 27, 1984

The Henry Ebeling House is a historic building located in the West End of Davenport, Iowa, United States. Henry Ebeling, a local contractor was the first person to live in the house in 1888. He more than likely built it as well. The two-story house features a cross-gable plan, a polygonal bay window on the east side, and it has two additions made to the back. While some of the architectural details are now missing from the house, one can still see some of them on the front porch. The Late Victorian style residence has been listed on the National Register of Historic Places since 1984.
