= F.J. Raible House =

Historic house in Iowa, United States

- U.S. National Register of Historic Places
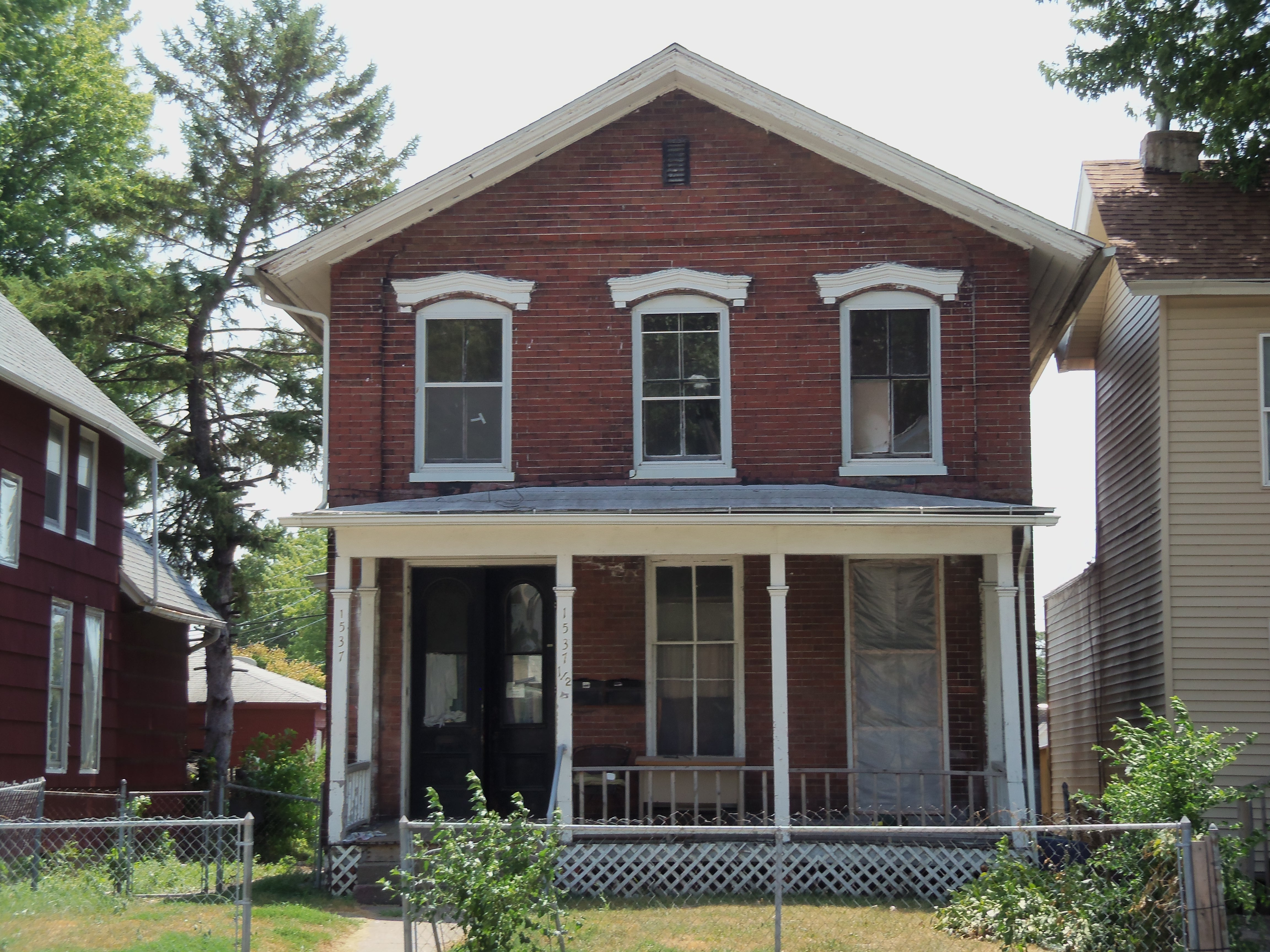

- Location within Iowa Location within the United States
- Location: 1537 W. 3rd St. Davenport, Iowa
- Coordinates: 41°31′19″N 90°35′53″W
- Area: less than one acre
- Built: 1870
- Architectural style: Greek Revival
- MPS: Davenport MRA
- NRHP reference No.: 83003683
- Added to NRHP: November 28, 1983

The F.J. Raible House is a historic building located in the West End of Davenport, Iowa, United States. F.J. Raible, who worked for a cigar manufacturer, began living in this house in 1884. While this house follows the Greek Revival style, which was very popular in Davenport, the main entrance and the windows are set within a slightly recessed plane. The window hoods are the only other decorative element on the house. This residence has been listed on the National Register of Historic Places since 1983.
