= Frick's Tavern =

- U.S. National Register of Historic Places
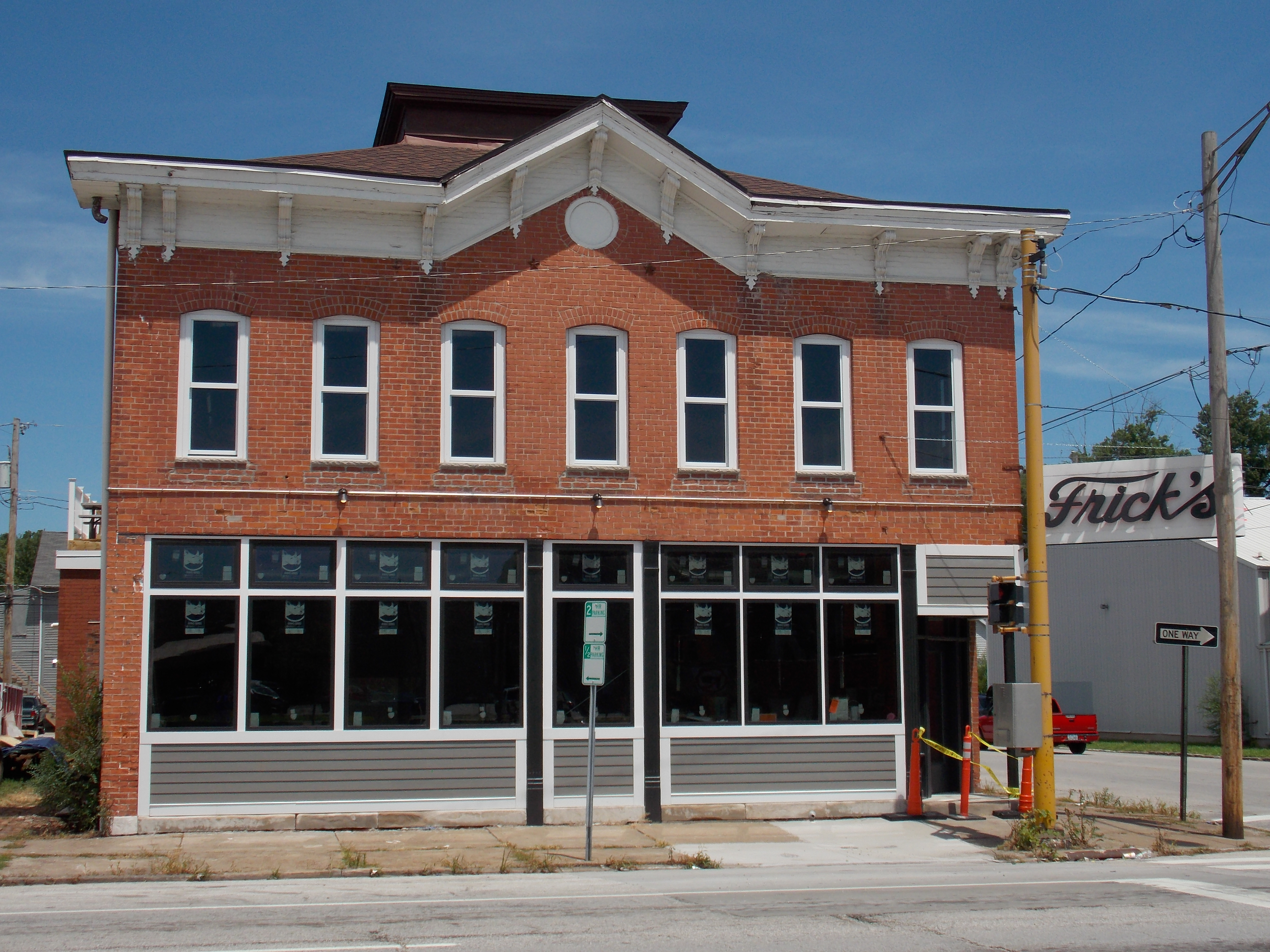
- Frick's in 2016

- Location within Iowa Location within the United States
- Location: 1402-1404 W. 3rd St. Davenport, Iowa
- Coordinates: 41°31′20″N 90°35′40″W
- Area: less than one acre
- Built: 1872
- Architectural style: Italianate
- NRHP reference No.: 74000808
- Added to NRHP: September 9, 1974

Frick's Tavern, also known as Frick's Place, is a historic building located in the West End of Davenport, Iowa, United States. It has been listed on the National Register of Historic Places since 1974. The building is a two-story brick structure that sits on the northwest corner of West Third and Fillmore Streets. It is part of a small commercial district near the historic German neighborhoods and the industrial areas along the Mississippi River. It is a typical commercial building in the West End which combined commercial space on the first floor and apartments on the second floor.

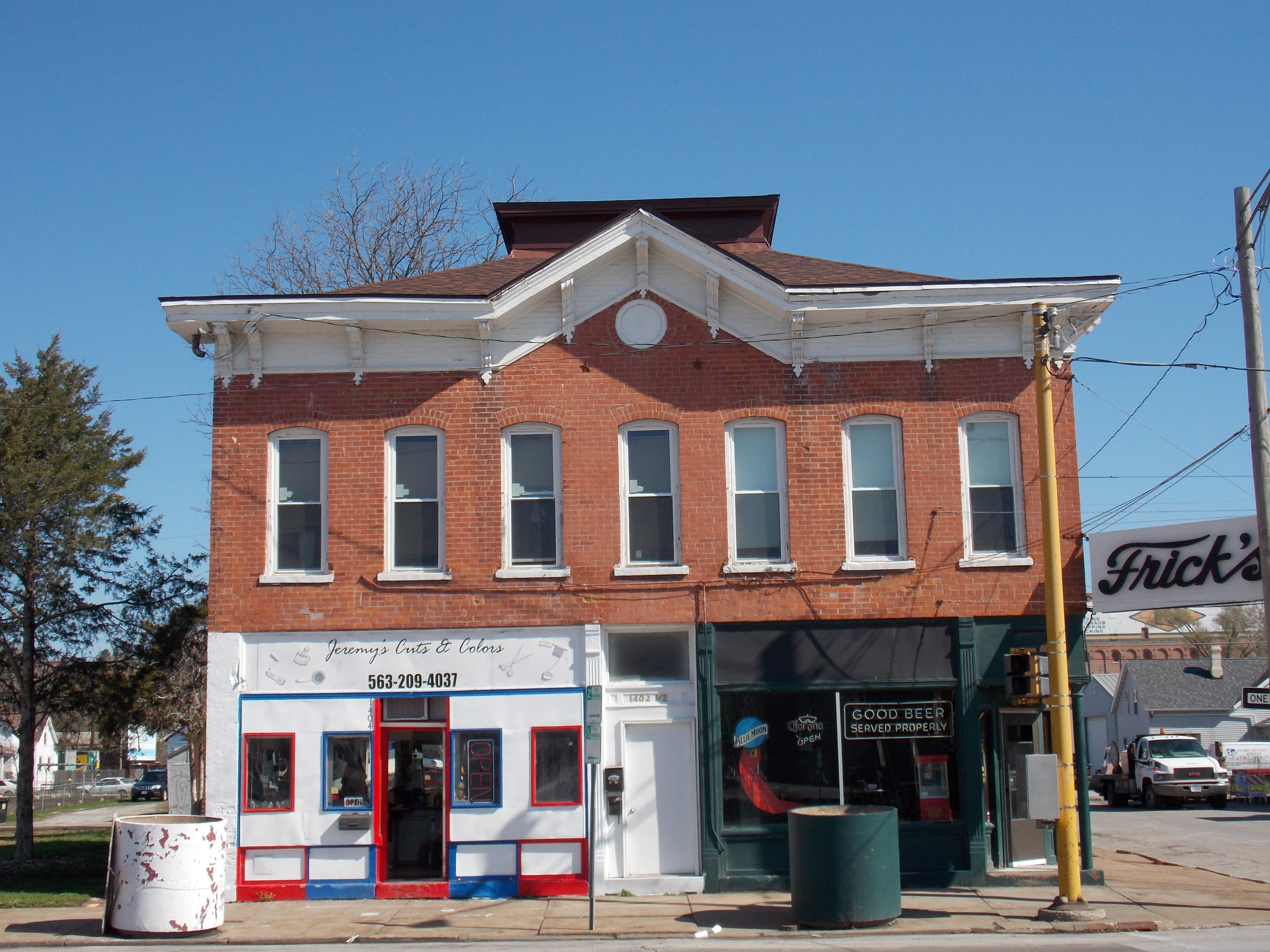
Frick's before the 2016 renovation

== History ==
The building was built in 1872. Over the years it has housed a bakery, tavern, barbershop and living quarters. A tavern opened in the building in 1876 and there has been one there ever since. It is the oldest bar in Davenport, and the second oldest in the State of Iowa. Charles Frick opened a tavern in the building in 1888 and his descendants kept it in operation for three generations. The family lived in the apartments above, and Floy Frick maintained a garden in the back. The bar was a center of social activity for Davenport's west end German community. After Ross Frick died in 1986, the family sold the business to Chuck Fogle. When Chuck died in 1992 his wife Betty continued ownership until she sold the business in 2015. A self-proclaimed teetotaler, Betty Fogle leased the business to five different people. She sold it to NKP LLC, who completed an extensive renovation of the building.

== Architecture ==
The building is designed in the Italianate style. It features bracketed eaves and flat-arched windows on the second floor. The building is topped with a hipped roof. The main floor of the building had two commercial spaces for most of its history. They were combined in the 2016 renovation and a full-size commercial kitchen was added. There was a door in between the commercial spaces on Third Street with access to the two apartments on the second floor. The apartments were also eliminated in 2016, and converted into an upstairs barroom. At the time the building became a tavern the rear section of the building, covered with a shingled surface, was added. There is also a brick addition in the back that was added at an unknown date. In 1923 the corner door entrance was added to the tavern. Shutters and chimneys were also removed over the years.
