= National Register of Historic Places listings in Downtown Davenport, Iowa =

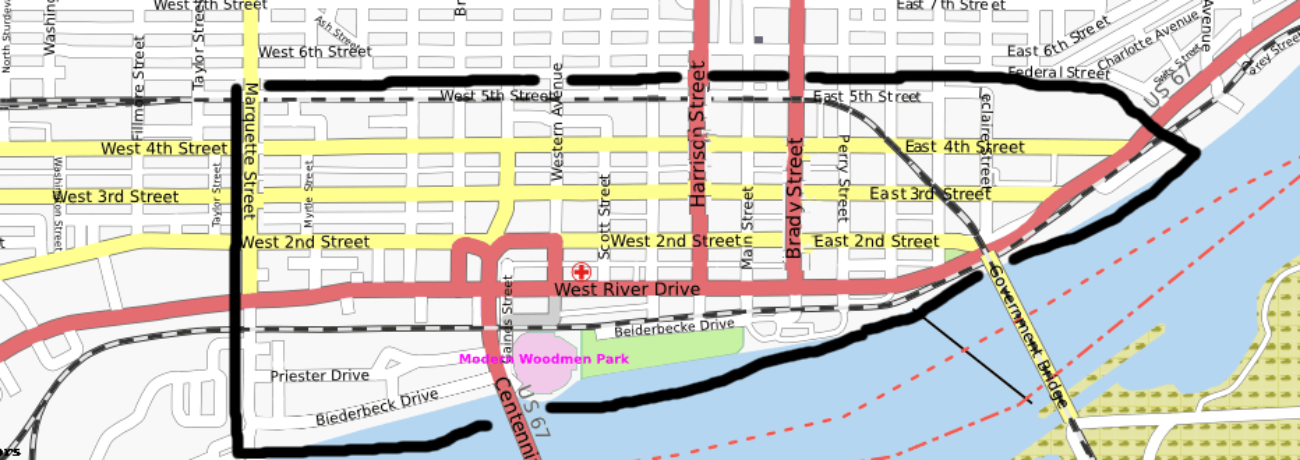
Border of Downtown Davenport

This is intended to be a complete list of the properties and districts on the National Register of Historic Places in Downtown Davenport, Iowa, United States. Downtown Davenport is defined as being all of the city south of 5th Street from Marquette Street east to the intersection of River Drive (U.S. Route 67) and East 4th Street. The locations of National Register properties and districts may be seen in an online map.

There are 257 properties and districts listed on the National Register in Davenport. Downtown Davenport includes 57 of these properties and districts; the city's remaining properties and districts are listed elsewhere. Another 10 properties were once listed but have been removed.

The National Register of Historic Places is the United States government's official list of districts, sites, buildings, structures, and objects deemed worthy of preservation. A property listed in the National Register, or located within a National Register Historic District, may qualify for tax incentives derived from the total value of expenses incurred preserving the property. The passage of the National Historic Preservation Act National Historic Preservation Act (NHPA) in 1966 established the National Register and the process for adding properties to it. For most of its history the National Register has been administered by the National Park Service (NPS), an agency within the United States Department of the Interior. Its goals are to help property owners and interest groups coordinate, identify, and protect historic sites in the United States.

The historic preservation movement began in the city in the mid-1970s with the renovation of several historic structures. A comprehensive study of the city's neighborhoods, districts and architecture began in 1978. The study was conducted in three phases. The first two phases were carried out from 1979 to 1982 and the third phases from 1982 to 1983. The results were published in two volumes. Davenport—Where the Mississippi Runs West reported on the first two phases and Davenport Architecture—Tradition and Transition reported on the third phase. A Multiple Resource nomination was submitted to the National Register of Historic Places that included 12 districts, more than 1,650 buildings on 350 parcels. By March 1985 all the districts and 249 properties were listed on the national register.

The Historic Preservation Commission was established in 1992, and the historic preservation ordinance was passed the same year. Davenport became a Certified Local Government in the state of Iowa. It was now responsible to review local projects participating in state and national preservation programs. It was also able to exercise some control over the modification and/or demolition of historic buildings in the city. The historic preservation ordinance also allowed the establishment of a local register of historic properties. The first four properties were added in 1992. As of 2011, there are 44 properties listed, of which 24 are individually listed on the National Register of Historic Places and 14 are contributing properties in a historic district on the National Register.

This National Park Service list is complete through NPS recent listings posted July 31, 2026.

== Current listings ==
	Name on the Register	Image	Date listed	Location	Description
1	Henry Berg Building	Henry Berg Building	July 7, 1983 (#83002400)	246 W. 3rd St. 41°31′21″N 90°34′37″W	Romanesque Revival style commercial building from c. 1875, built by gunsmith Henry Berg; Davenport MRA.
2	Blackhawk Hotel	Blackhawk Hotel	July 7, 1983 (#83002402)	309 Perry St. 41°31′22″N 90°34′20″W	Renaissance Revival style hotel that opened in 1915 and was expanded in 1920; Davenport MRA. The hotel has been host to several high-profile people including Carl Sandburg, Herbert Hoover, Richard Nixon, Jack Dempsey, and Cary Grant.
3	Building at 813–815 W. Second Street	Building at 813–815 W. Second Street	July 7, 1983 (#83002408)	813–815 W. 2nd St. 41°31′16″N 90°35′06″W	A Classical Revival style building that originally served as a warehouse until it was renovated in 2003 as a nightclub.
4	Building at 202 W. Third Street	Building at 202 W. Third Street	April 5, 1984 (#84001318)	202 W. 3rd St. 41°31′22″N 90°34′33″W	Single-story, Classical Revival style commercial building; Davenport MRA.
5	Building at 1119–1121 W. Third Street	Building at 1119–1121 W. Third Street	July 7, 1983 (#83002407)	1119–1121 W. 3rd St. 41°31′20″N 90°35′24″W	Three-story Early Commercial style building. The only decoration on the façade is brick corbelling at the cornice level and keystones over the windows.; Davenport MRA.
6	Central Fire Station	Central Fire Station	April 22, 1982 (#82002638)	331 Scott St. 41°31′23″N 90°34′47″W	Italianate and Classical Revival style building from 1902 that continues to serve as Davenport's fire department headquarters.
7	Central Office Building	Central Office Building	July 7, 1983 (#83002411)	230 W. 3rd St. 41°31′21″N 90°34′35″W	Four-story office and commercial building in the Early Commercial style and designed for H.F.C. Petersen who also owned the J.H.C. Petersen's Sons' Store; Davenport MRA.
8	Chicago, Milwaukee, St. Paul and Pacific Freight House	Chicago, Milwaukee, St. Paul and Pacific Freight House	November 14, 1985 (#85002825)	102 S. Ripley St. 41°31′12″N 90°34′45″W	Built in 1917 as a freight house for the Milwaukee Road. It has subsequently been used to house entertainment venues and a farmer's market; Davenport MRA.
9	City Market	City Market	April 5, 1984 (#84001329)	120 W. 5th St. 41°31′29″N 90°34′31″W	Romanesque Revival style building built in 1872 as a common marketplace in the city; Davenport MRA.
10	Davenport Bag and Paper Company Building	Davenport Bag and Paper Company Building	January 19, 2018 (#100001972)	301 E 2nd St. 41°31′17″N 90°34′15″W	Chicago-style manufacturing and warehousing building constructed in 1907.
11	Davenport Bank and Trust	Davenport Bank and Trust	July 7, 1983 (#83002395)	203 and 229 W. 3rd St. 41°31′20″N 90°34′33″W	Classical Revival style office building that opened in 1927. It is the tallest building in Davenport and it is part of the Davenport Multiple Resource Area (MRA).
12	Davenport City Hall	Davenport City Hall	April 22, 1982 (#82002639)	226 W. 4th St. 41°31′26″N 90°34′36″W	A Richardsonian Romanesque civic building, which was built in 1895 to replace the old city hall. The building was designed by John W. Ross and cost $100,000 to complete. The building continues to serve as city hall.
13	Davenport Downtown Commercial Historic District	Davenport Downtown Commercial Historic District	September 11, 2020 (#100005546)	2nd St. to 5th St., Perry St. to Western Ave. 41°31′23″N 90°34′14″W	The district includes about 14 blocks of the central business district. It includes the elevated railroad tracks that runs along the north side of the downtown area.
14	Davenport Hotel	Davenport Hotel	July 7, 1983 (#83002419)	324 Main St. 41°31′24″N 90°34′33″W	Davenport architect P.T. Burrows designed the Renaissance Revival hotel building that opened in 1907. It is now an apartment building; Davenport MRA.
15	Davenport Motor Row and Industrial Historic District	Davenport Motor Row and Industrial Historic District	June 27, 2019 (#100004113)	River Dr., 2nd & 3rd Sts. between Perry & Iowa Sts; 41°31′17″N 90°34′16″W	Commercial and light industrial district on the east side of downtown that played an important role in the local automotive industry in the early to the mid-20th century.
16	Democrat Building	Democrat Building	July 7, 1983 (#83002420)	407–411 Brady St. 41°31′26″N 90°34′26″W	Designed by Davenport architect Rudolph J. Clausen in 1923 for the Davenport Democrat. It also housed The Catholic Messenger for a time before becoming commercial space. The building is considered significant because of its association with newspapers in Davenport, and as an example of the local influence of Louis Sullivan, whose work figures prominently in the history of American architecture; Davenport MRA.
17	Dillon Memorial	Dillon Memorial	July 7, 1983 (#83002421)	S. Main St. 41°31′12″N 90°34′32″W	Classical Revival structure built in 1918 and dedicated to Davenport native Judge John Forrest Dillon; Davenport MRA.
18	Donahue Building	Donahue Building	July 7, 1983 (#83002423)	114 W. 3rd St. 41°31′21″N 90°34′29″W	Three-story commercial building from c. 1880 and is a rare example in Iowa with a basement level storefront. It was first used as Victorian Turkish Baths; Davenport MRA.
19	Ferdinand Ewert Building	Ferdinand Ewert Building	July 7, 1983 (#83002425)	1107 W. 2nd St. 41°31′16″N 90°35′21″W	Ferdinand Ewert Building. Now an empty lot. Davenport MRA
20	Ficke Block	Ficke Block	July 7, 1983 (#83002427)	307–309 Harrison St. 41°31′22″N 90°34′36″W	Late Victorian commercial and apartment buildings. The building is associated with a prominent Davenport Attorney Charles August (C.A.) Ficke. He was responsible for building or renovating numerous properties in the downtown area. The building originally housed the McCormick Harvesting Machine Company and apartments on the upper floors. Over the years it housed the L.R. Wareham pool hall and many other businesses; Davenport MRA.
21	First Federal Savings and Loan Association Building	First Federal Savings and Loan Association Building	October 25, 2016 (#16000577)	131 W. Third Street; 41°31′20″N 90°34′31″W	Three-story Modern bank building completed in 1966.
22	First National Bank Building	First National Bank Building	July 7, 1983 (#83002430)	201 W. 2nd St. 41°31′16″N 90°34′33″W	Nine-story bank and office building in the Renaissance Revival style. It was the first bank in the nation to open under the new National Banking and Currency Act; Davenport MRA.
23	Forrest Block	Forrest Block	July 7, 1983 (#83002433)	401 Brady St. 41°31′25″N 90°34′26″W	Three-story commercial block designed in the Italianate style in 1875. It is now an apartment building; Davenport MRA.
24	Germania-Miller/Standard Hotel	Germania-Miller/Standard Hotel	July 7, 1983 (#83002438)	712 W. 2nd St. 41°31′17″N 90°35′01″W	Former hotel built in 1871 that housed many German immigrants when they first arrived in Davenport. It now serves as a center and museum for German-American culture; Davenport MRA.
25	Hauschild's Hall	Hauschild's Hall	July 7, 1983 (#83002442)	1136 W. 3rd St. 41°31′21″N 90°35′27″W	Three-story building completed c. 1880 that served as the local headquarters of the German Knights of Labor. Davenport MRA
26	Bonaventura Heinz House (second)	Bonaventura Heinz House (second)	July 7, 1983 (#83002444)	1130 W. 5th St. 41°31′29″N 90°35′25″W	Greek Revival style residence from 1860; Davenport MRA.
27	Hibernia Hall	Hibernia Hall	July 7, 1983 (#83002446)	421 Brady St. 41°31′27″N 90°34′25″W	Designed by Frederick G. Clausen in the Romanesque Revival style in 1891 to house the local chapter of the Ancient Order of Hibernians. It is now commercial space; Davenport MRA.
28	Hiller Building	Hiller Building	July 24, 1974 (#74000810)	310–314 Gaines St. 41°31′22″N 90°35′00″W	Row houses built in the Federal style in 1859.
29	Hoffman Building	Hoffman Building	July 7, 1983 (#83002447)	510 W. 2nd St. 41°31′17″N 90°34′50″W	Greek Revival style commercial building from 1855. The building was typical of Davenport’s early commercial architecture with a steep-pitched side-gable roof. The building was replaced by a parking lot. Davenport MRA.
30	Hose Station No. 1	Hose Station No. 1	July 7, 1983 (#83002449)	117 Perry St. 41°31′15″N 90°34′21″W	Built in 1877 in the Italianate style as Davenport’s first fire station. It was replaced in 1902 by the Central Fire Station; Davenport MRA.
31	Hotel Mississippi-RKO Orpheum Theater	Hotel Mississippi-RKO Orpheum Theater	October 22, 1998 (#98001273)	106 E. 3rd St. 41°31′22″N 90°34′25″W	Art Deco style hotel and movie palace from 1931. It is now an apartment building and performing arts center; Davenport MRA.
32	House at 318–332 Marquette Street	House at 318–332 Marquette Street	July 7, 1983 (#83002454)	318–332 Marquette St. 41°31′23″N 90°35′28″W	2 1/2-story rowhouse from 1870; Davenport MRA.
33	International Harvester Truck Sales and Service Station	International Harvester Truck Sales and Service Station	March 31, 2025 (#100011580)	601 W. 2nd St. 41°31′16″N 90°34′55″W	It was built in 1927 by International Harvester for their first truck sales and service facility. It is now an apartment buildings known as Bowstring Lofts.
34	Iowa Reform Building	Iowa Reform Building	November 18, 1983 (#83003658)	526 W. 2nd St. 41°31′17″N 90°34′52″W	Built c. 1892 to house a German-language newspaper, the Iowa Reform, which remained in print until 1943. It continues to serve as a commercial building; Davenport MRA.
35	Kahl Building	Kahl Building	July 7, 1983 (#83002456)	326 W. 3rd St. 41°31′22″N 90°34′41″W	Ten-story office and theater building constructed in 1920, built by Henry Kahl and Davenport architect; Davenport MRA.
36	Koenig Building	Koenig Building	July 7, 1983 (#83002460)	619 W. 2nd St. 41°31′16″N 90°34′56″W	Italianate style commercial building; Davenport MRA. Replaced by a parking lot.
37	Linden Flats	Linden Flats	November 28, 1983 (#83003661)	219 Scott St. 41°31′19″N 90°34′47″W	Apartment block designed in a combination of the Federal and Colonial Revival styles by Clausen & Burrows. The building was torn down in 2005 after a fire destroyed it; Davenport MRA.
38	The Linograph Company Building	The Linograph Company Building	September 23, 2009 (#09000764)	420 W. River Dr. 41°31′14″N 90°34′47″W	Davenport architects Clausen & Kruse designed the building for industrial use in 1919. The building originally produced typesetting machines. In 1954 The Salvation Army acquired the building, and used it for a variety of purposes, including an Adult Rehabilitation Center, which relocated in 2004. The building is currently used for apartments.
39	Meiser Drug Store	Meiser Drug Store	July 7, 1983 (#83002470)	1115 W. 3rd St. 41°31′20″N 90°35′24″W	Commercial building built in 1888; Davenport MRA.
40	Old City Hall	Old City Hall	July 7, 1983 (#83002479)	514 Brady St. 41°31′30″N 90°34′28″W	Renaissance Revival style building from 1857 that served as city hall. The exterior was significantly altered when it was converted into apartments in 1910; Davenport MRA.
41	J.H.C. Petersen's Sons' Store	J.H.C. Petersen's Sons' Store	July 7, 1983 (#83002483)	123–131 W. 2nd St. 41°31′16″N 90°34′31″W	Former department store building built in the Romanesque Revival style in 1892. It was the flagship retail store of what would become Von Maur. The structure continues to serve as a commercial building and performing arts venue. The building was designed by Fredrick G. Clausen; Davenport MRA.
42	W.D. Petersen Memorial Music Pavilion	W.D. Petersen Memorial Music Pavilion	July 7, 1983 (#83002485)	Beiderbecke Dr. 41°31′07″N 90°34′46″W	The Mission/Spanish Revival style structure was designed by Rudolph J. Clausen and built on the riverfront in 1924; Davenport MRA.
43	Prien Building	Prien Building	July 7, 1983 (#83002488)	506–508 W. 2nd St. 41°31′18″N 90°34′49″W	Greek Revival style commercial building from 1855. A two-story brick structure that featured a prefabricated iron shop-front. Davenport MRA. Replaced by a parking lot.
44	Putnam-Parker Block	Putnam-Parker Block	September 15, 2011 (#11000662)	100–130 W 2nd St. 41°31′18″N 90°34′30″W	North side of West Second Street between Main and Brady Streets. Chicago Commercial style office towers designed by Daniel Burnham and built in 1910 (Putnam Building) and 1922 (Parker Building).
45	Renwick Building	Renwick Building	July 7, 1983 (#83002491)	324 Brady St. 41°31′24″N 90°34′28″W	Chicago Commercial style building built in 1897. The building was built by its namesake William Renwick, who was a prosperous Davenport industrialist in the late 19th and early 20th centuries. The building has housed various furniture stores over the years; Davenport MRA.
46	Saengerfest Halle	Saengerfest Halle	July 7, 1983 (#83002494)	1012 W. 4th St. 41°31′26″N 90°35′17″W	Built in 1914 to replace the original Saengerfest Halle that was built for a German music festival held in 1898. The present building known as the Coliseum, or The Col Ballroom, has been a popular entertainment and dance venue; Davenport MRA.
47	St. Anthony's Roman Catholic Church Complex	St. Anthony's Roman Catholic Church Complex	April 5, 1984 (#84001538)	407 and 417 Main St. 41°31′26″N 90°34′30″W	St. Anthony’s was the first Christian congregation to organize in Davenport in 1837. The original church, completed in 1838, is still standing behind the present Greek Revival church, whose front section was completed in 1853; Davenport MRA.
48	Schmidt Block	Schmidt Block	July 7, 1983 (#83002498)	115 E. 3rd St. 41°31′20″N 90°34′24″W	Romanesque Revival style commercial building from 1896. The building was built by Fritz T. Schmidt in 1896 to house his wine and liquor business, which was known as Fritz T. Schmidt and Sons. In the late 1970s and 1980s the building housed an upscale restaurant called J.K. Frizbee’s. Duck City, another upscale restaurant, occupies the building now; Davenport MRA.
49	Scott County Jail	Scott County Jail	July 7, 1983 (#83002502)	428 Ripley St. 41°31′28″N 90°34′45″W	The original Italianate style jail designed by Frederick G.Clausen in 1897. It is the main detention facility for Scott County, Iowa. In 2008, a $29.7 million expansion was completed, bringing the total available housing to 354 inmates.
50	Siemer House	Siemer House	November 16, 1977 (#77000557)	632 W. 3rd St. 41°31′21″N 90°34′58″W	Two-story late Victorian home from 1865. The house was a contributing resource to the West Third Street Historic District. Torn down in 2007.
51	Union Savings Bank and Trust	Union Savings Bank and Trust	July 7, 1983 (#83002520)	229 Brady St. 41°31′20″N 90°34′25″W	Seven-story bank and office building designed in the Classical Revival style by the Davenport architectural firm of Temple & Burrows; Davenport MRA.
52	Union Station and Burlington Freight House	Union Station and Burlington Freight House	July 7, 1983 (#83002521)	120 S. Harrison St. 41°31′11″N 90°34′40″W	Classical Revival style train station and freight house built in 1924; Davenport MRA.
53	United States Post Office and Court House	United States Post Office and Court House	March 25, 2005 (#05000192)	131 E. 4th St. 41°31′23″N 90°34′23″W	Art Deco/Moderne style building designed by Davenport architect Seth Temple. It currently serves as a Federal Courthouse for the Southern District of Iowa.
54	Walsh Flats/Langworth Building	Walsh Flats/Langworth Building	April 5, 1984 (#84001582)	320–330 W. 4th St. 41°31′26″N 90°34′41″W	Classical Revival style apartment block from 1910; Davenport MRA. Replaced by the Police Department.
55	West Third Street Historic District	West Third Street Historic District	November 18, 1983 (#83003741)	Roughly 3rd St. between Ripley and Myrtle Sts. 41°31′20″N 90°34′56″W	Commercial and residential district on the west side of downtown that was largely inhabited by German immigrants in the late 19th and early 20th centuries; Davenport MRA.
56	Philip Worley House	Philip Worley House	July 7, 1983 (#83002524)	425 Brady St. 41°31′27″N 90°34′26″W	Greek Revival style house from 1860; Davenport MRA.
57	Wupperman Block/I.O.O.F. Hall	Wupperman Block/I.O.O.F. Hall	July 7, 1983 (#83002525)	508–512 Brady St. 41°31′30″N 90°34′28″W	Three-story commercial building and former Independent Order of Odd Fellows (I.O.O.F.) clubhouse that was designed in the Renaissance Revival style; Davenport MRA.

== Former listings ==
	Name on the Register	Image	Date listed	Date removed	Location	Description
1	Burtis-Kimball House Hotel	Burtis-Kimball House Hotel	April 2, 1979 (#79003696)	September 10, 2008	210 E. 4th St. 41°31′25″N 90°34′20″W	Italianate and Second Empire style hotel designed by Frederick G. Clausen and built in 1874. It was the home to former US President Ronald Reagan in the early 1930s.
2	Clifton-Metropolitan Hotel		July 7, 1983 (#83002413)	November 12, 1997	130 W. River Dr. 41°31′13″N 90°34′31″W	Also known as the G. L. Davenport Building. Demolished in November, 1995
3	Matthais Ferner Building		July 7, 1983 (#83002426)	May 16, 2003	212 Main Street	Demolished in 1990.
4	W. T. Grant Company Building		April 7, 1984 (#83002426)	May 16, 2003	226 W. 2nd Street; 41°31′18″N 90°34′36″W	Demolished in 1990.
5	Bonaventura Heinz House (first)		April 5, 1984 (#84001435)	July 22, 2005	1128 W. 5th St. 41°31′29″N 90°35′25″W	Colonial Revival style home.
6	Lend-A-Hand Club	Lend-A-Hand Club	April 5, 1984 (#84001459)	December 19, 2014	105 S. Main St. 41°31′12″N 90°34′31″W	Built as a club and residence for young single women who worked away from home. It was torn down in 1990. The Renaissance Revival structure was designed by Davenport architect Frederick G. Clausen; Davenport MRA.
7	Mueller Lumber Company		July 7, 1983 (#83002474)	August 26, 2005	501 W. 2nd St. 41°31′16″N 90°34′49″W	Demolished in April, 1995.
8	Ochs Building		July 7, 1983 (#83002478)	May 16, 2003	214 Main Street	Demolished in 1990.
9	J.H.C. Petersen's Sons Wholesale Building		July 7, 1983 (#83002484)	December 19, 2014	122–124 W. River Dr. 41°31′14″N 90°34′30″W	Chicago Commercial style building that was located behind the Petersen's department store building; Davenport MRA. Demolished in 1995.
10	Riepe Drug Store/G. Ott Block	Riepe Drug Store/G. Ott Block	July 7, 1983 (#83002493)	December 19, 2014	403 W. 2nd St. 41°31′16″N 90°34′44″W	Three-story Romanesque Revival commercial and apartment building from 1871; Davenport MRA.
11	SAINTE GENEVIEVE (dredge)	SAINTE GENEVIEVE (dredge)	August 4, 1986 (#86002232)	March 6, 2019	Antoine LeClaire Park at 400 W. Beiderbecke Drive; 41°31′06″N 90°34′34″W	Cutterhead dredge built by the Dravo Contracting Co. in 1932; Davenport MRA. It left Davenport in 1990 and sank twice before it was scrapped.
12	Schauder Hotel		July 7, 1983 (#83002495)	December 19, 2014	126 W. River Dr. 41°31′14″N 90°34′31″W	Italianate style building that has subsequently been torn down; Davenport MRA. Demolished in 1995.
13	Schick's Express and Transfer Co.		July 7, 1983 (#83002497)	December 19, 2014	118–120 W. River Dr. 41°31′14″N 90°34′29″W	Early Commercial style building from 1905. It was one of the few utilitarian buildings in Davenport that opened its walls with large windows, indicating the structure beneath its brick surface. Davenport MRA. Demolished in 1995.
14	Col. Joseph Young Block		July 7, 1983 (#83002526)	December 19, 2014	502 Brady St. 41°31′29″N 90°34′28″W	Three-story commercial building from 1857 that was designed in the Renaissance Revival style; Davenport MRA. Collapsed on August 9, 2009.

== See also ==
- List of National Historic Landmarks in Iowa
- National Register of Historic Places listings in Iowa
