= Col. Joseph Young Block =

- Formerly listed on the U.S. National Register of Historic Places

- Location within Iowa Location within the United States
- Location: 502 Brady St. Davenport, Iowa
- Coordinates: 41°31′30″N 90°34′27″W
- Area: less than one acre
- Built: 1857
- Architectural style: Renaissance Revival
- MPS: Davenport MRA
- NRHP reference No.: 83002526

Significant dates
- Added to NRHP: July 7, 1983
- Removed from NRHP: December 19, 2014

The Col. Joseph Young Block was located just to the north of downtown Davenport, Iowa, United States. It was listed on the National Register of Historic Places in 1983. The building has subsequently been torn down. It occupied the same block as the Wupperman Block/I.O.O.F. Hall, which was next door, the Old City Hall, and the Clarissa C. Cook Library/Blue Ribbon News Building. The library and this building were removed from the National Register in 2014.

== History ==
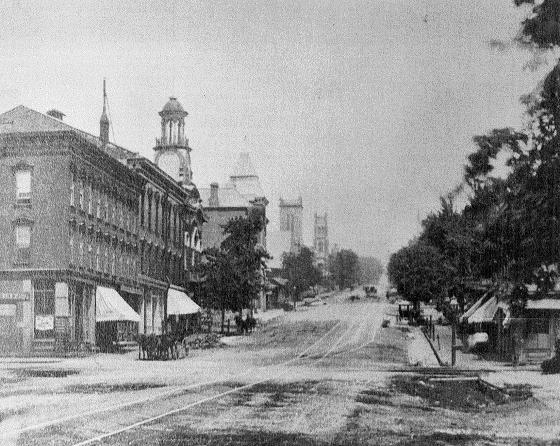
The Col. Young Block is the first building on the left in this 1880 photograph. Note the cornice that was later removed.

The building was constructed by Colonel Joseph Young, a land speculator, in 1857. He probably built this building on speculation. It housed retail and service businesses over the years, which included different saloons and restaurants. The building had been declining over the years and it was slated for demolition when a part of the building collapsed on August 9, 2009. The building was torn down later that year.

== Architecture ==
The Colonel Young Block was a three-story, nine bay, brick building that was built on a stone foundation. Its decorative elements were found in the tall narrow windows and their projecting hoods. When it was built it featured an ornate cornice that was removed in later years. A skim coat application had been applied to the exterior. The building's original three-bay storefronts were altered with a permastone covering.
