= J.H.C. Petersen's Sons Wholesale Building =

- Formerly listed on the U.S. National Register of Historic Places
- J.H.C. Petersen's Sons Wholesale Building is in the background with the store name on it

- Location within Iowa Location within the United States
- Location: 122-124 W. River Dr. Davenport, Iowa
- Coordinates: 41°31′14″N 90°34′30″W
- Area: less than one acre
- Built: 1909-1910
- Architect: Clausen & Clausen
- Architectural style: Commercial
- MPS: Davenport MRA
- NRHP reference No.: 83002484

Significant dates
- Added to NRHP: July 7, 1983
- Removed from NRHP: December 19, 2014

The J.H.C. Petersen's Sons Wholesale Building was a historic building located in downtown Davenport, Iowa, United States. It was built in 1910 and listed on the National Register of Historic Places in 1983.

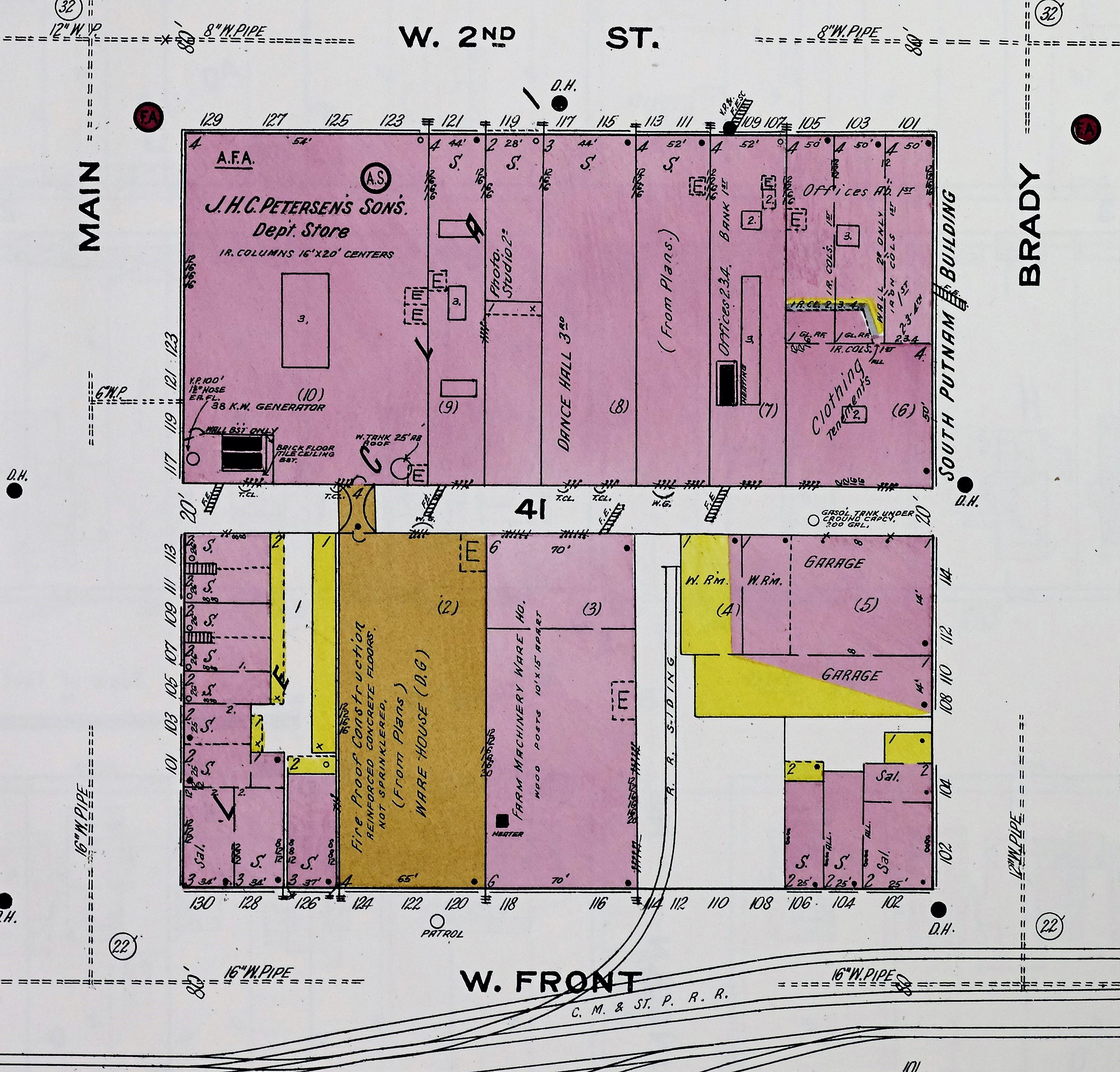
1910 Sanborn Map shows the Wholesale Building connected to the original store across the alley.

== History ==
The building was one of five buildings that were a part of the J.H.C. Petersen's Sons' Store. It was built as a warehouse between 1909 and 1910 during a period of expanding sales for the store. It stood between the Schick's Express and Transfer Co. building and the former Schauder Hotel. All three of these buildings along with the Clifton-Metropolitan Hotel on the corner of River Drive and Main Street were torn down to make way for a parking structure and the Davenport Skybridge. The property was delisted from the National Register in 2014.

== Architecture ==
Designed by the Davenport architectural firm of Clausen & Clausen, the building expresses a local adaptation of the Chicago Commercial style. Its internal structure is conservatively expressed in the facade. The exterior was covered in brick, which allowed for the use of large windows and improved daylight illumination on the interior. The wide segmented arches on the fourth floor and above the main entrance are simply decorative elements.
