= National Register of Historic Places listings in Davenport, Iowa =

Location of Davenport in Iowa

Davenport, Iowa, United States, has 254 properties and districts listed on the National Register of Historic Places. Latitude and longitude coordinates are provided for many National Register properties and districts; these locations may be seen together in an online map. One district, the Vander Veer Park Historic District, is split between east and west Davenport.

The remaining 32 properties and districts on the National Register in Scott County are listed separately.

This National Park Service list is complete through NPS recent listings posted August 8, 2025.

== Number of listings by region ==
The properties are distributed across all parts of Davenport. For the purposes of this list, the city is split into three regions: East Davenport, which includes all of the city east of Brady Street (U.S. Route 61) and north of 5th Street; Downtown Davenport, which includes all of the city south of 5th Street from Marquette Street east to the intersection of River Drive (U.S. Route 67) and 4th Street; and West Davenport, which includes all of the city west of Marquette Street and between Marquette and Brady Street (U.S. Route 61) north of 5th Street.

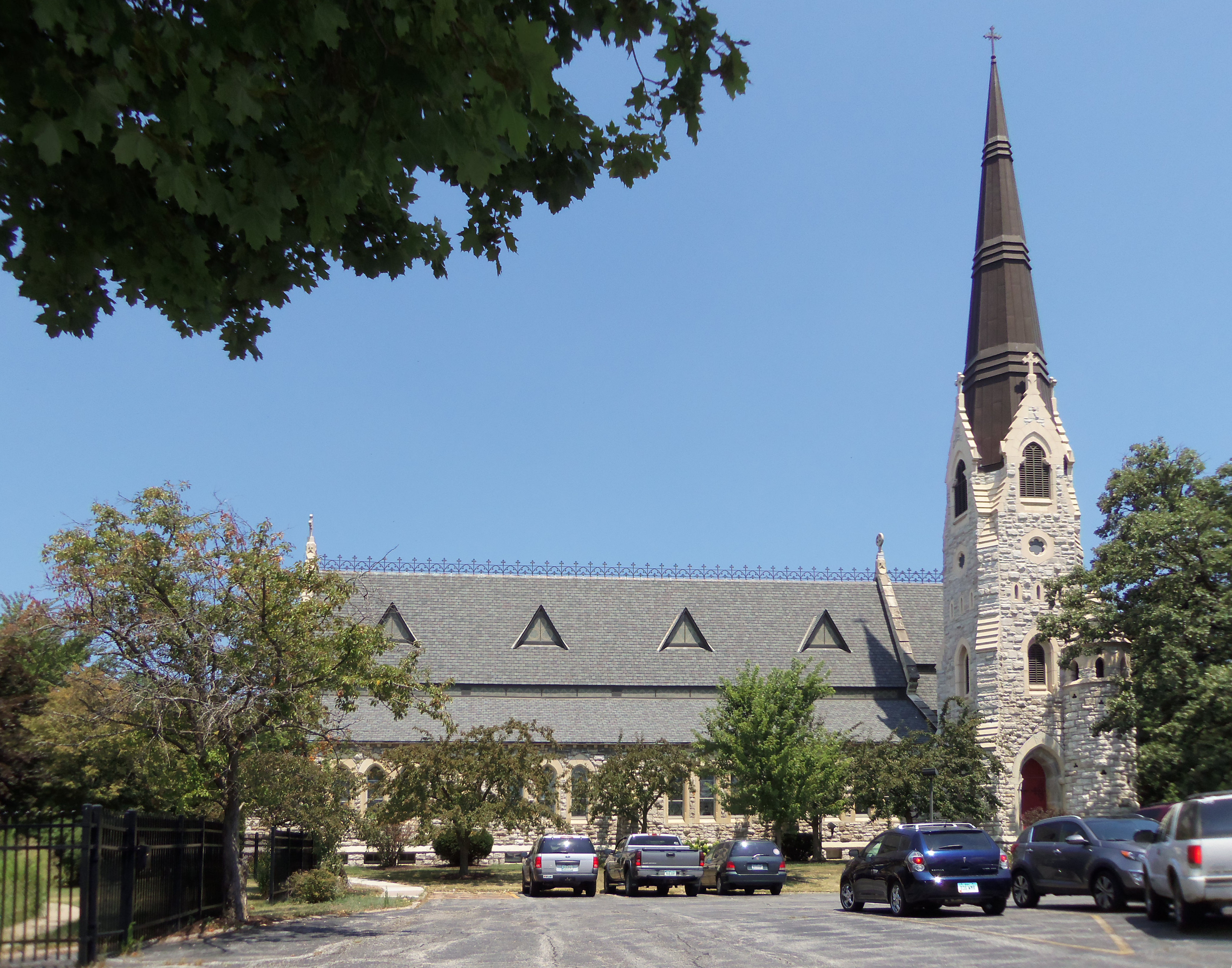
Trinity Episcopal Cathedral, in west Davenport

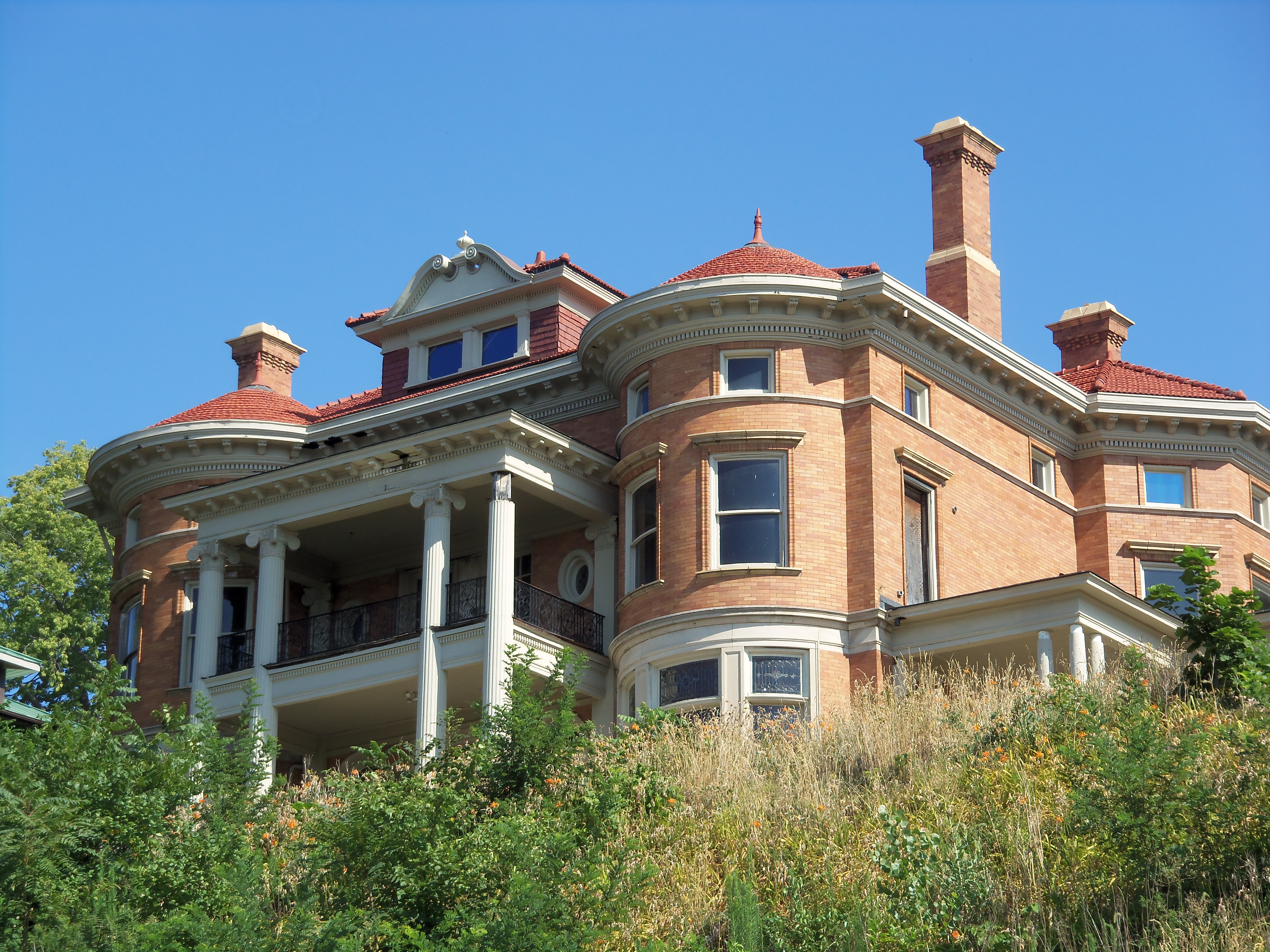
Hamburg Historic District, in west Davenport

| | Region | # of Sites |
|---|---|---|
| 1 | East Davenport | 91 |
| 2 | Downtown Davenport | 57 |
| 3 | West Davenport | 110 |
| (Duplicates): | | (2) |
| Total: | | 257 |

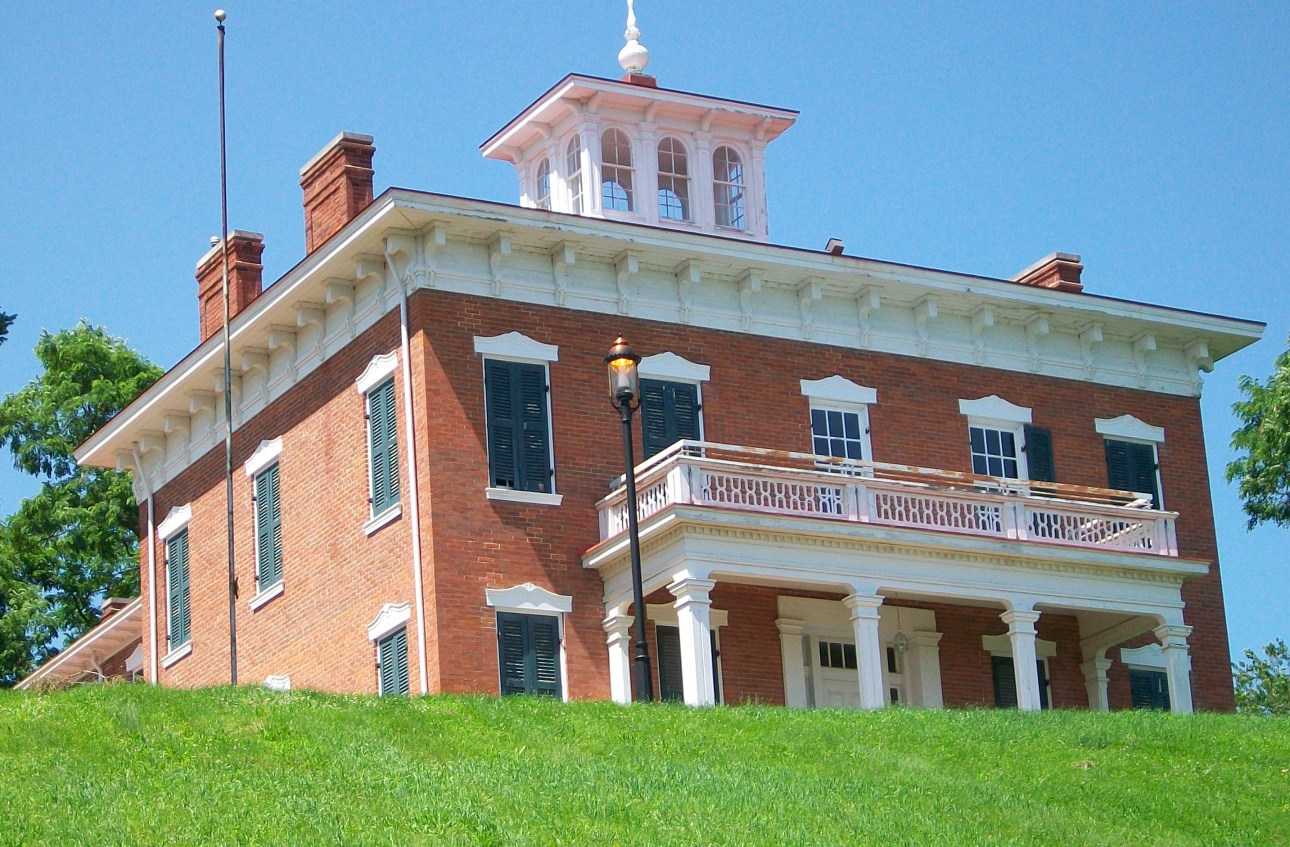
Antoine LeClaire House, in east Davenport

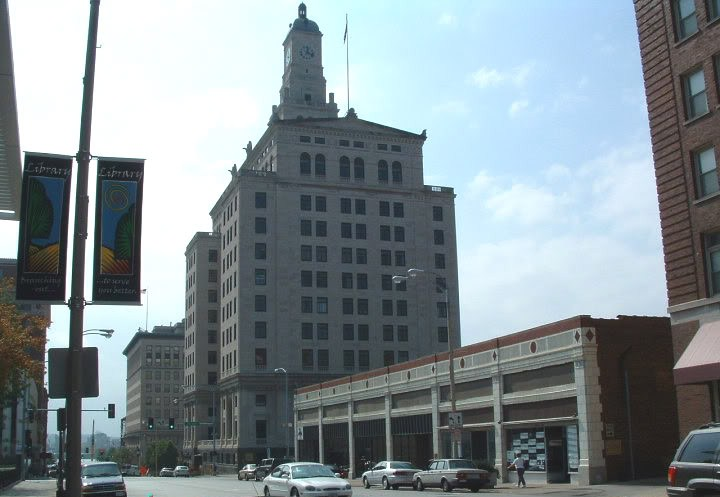
American Commercial and Savings Bank, Downtown Davenport

== See also ==
- List of National Historic Landmarks in Iowa
- National Register of Historic Places listings in Iowa
