= Schauder Hotel =

- Formerly listed on the U.S. National Register of Historic Places
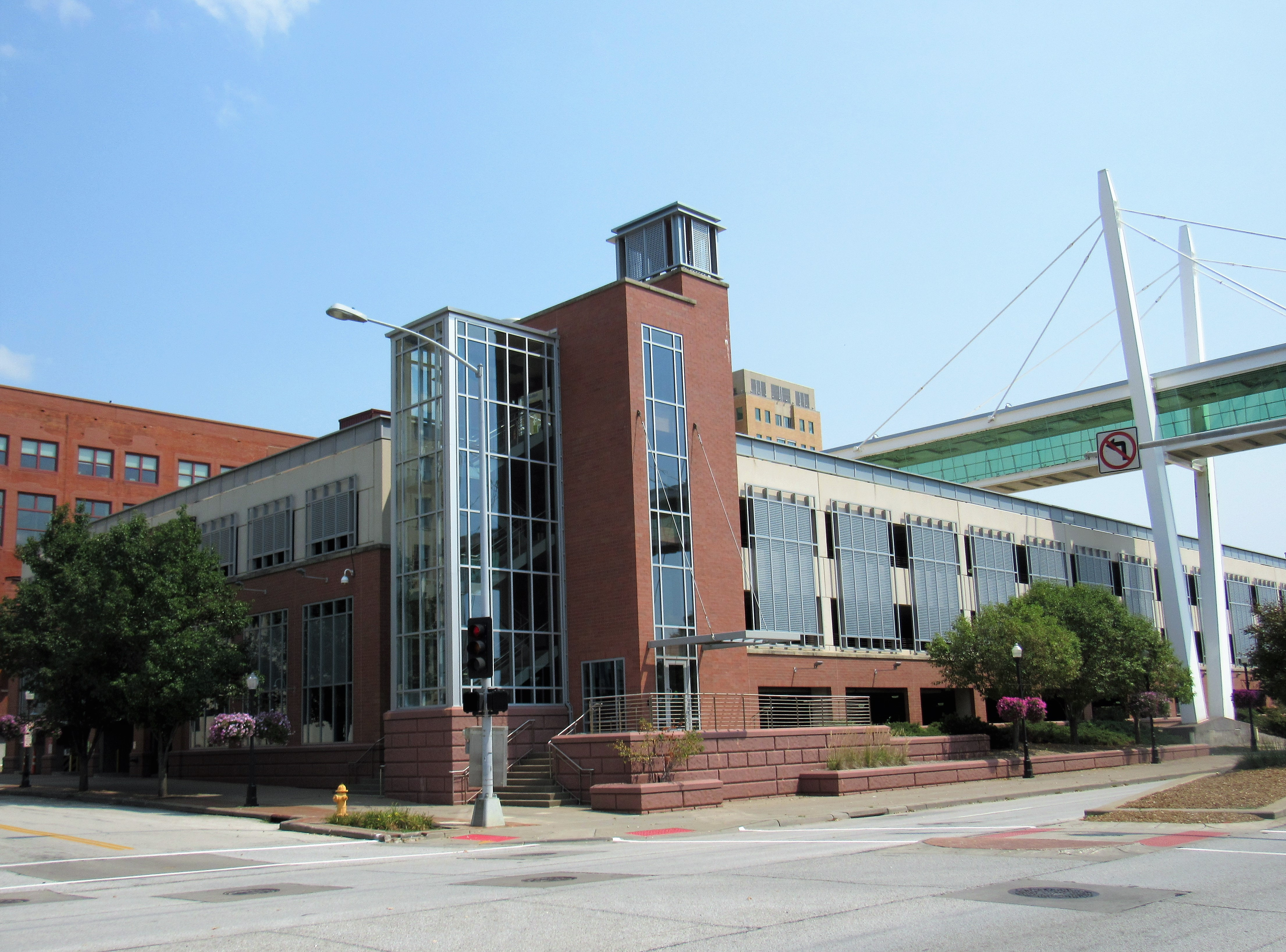
- The building was located where this parking ramp now stands.

- Location within Iowa Location within the United States
- Location: 126 W. River Dr. Davenport, Iowa
- Coordinates: 41°31′11″N 90°34′30″W
- Area: less than one acre
- Built: 1876
- Architectural style: Italianate
- MPS: Davenport MRA
- NRHP reference No.: 83002495

Significant dates
- Added to NRHP: July 7, 1983
- Removed from NRHP: December 19, 2014

The Schauder Hotel was a historic building located in downtown Davenport, Iowa, United States. It was built in the Italianate style facing the Mississippi River, and it was listed on the National Register of Historic Places in 1983.

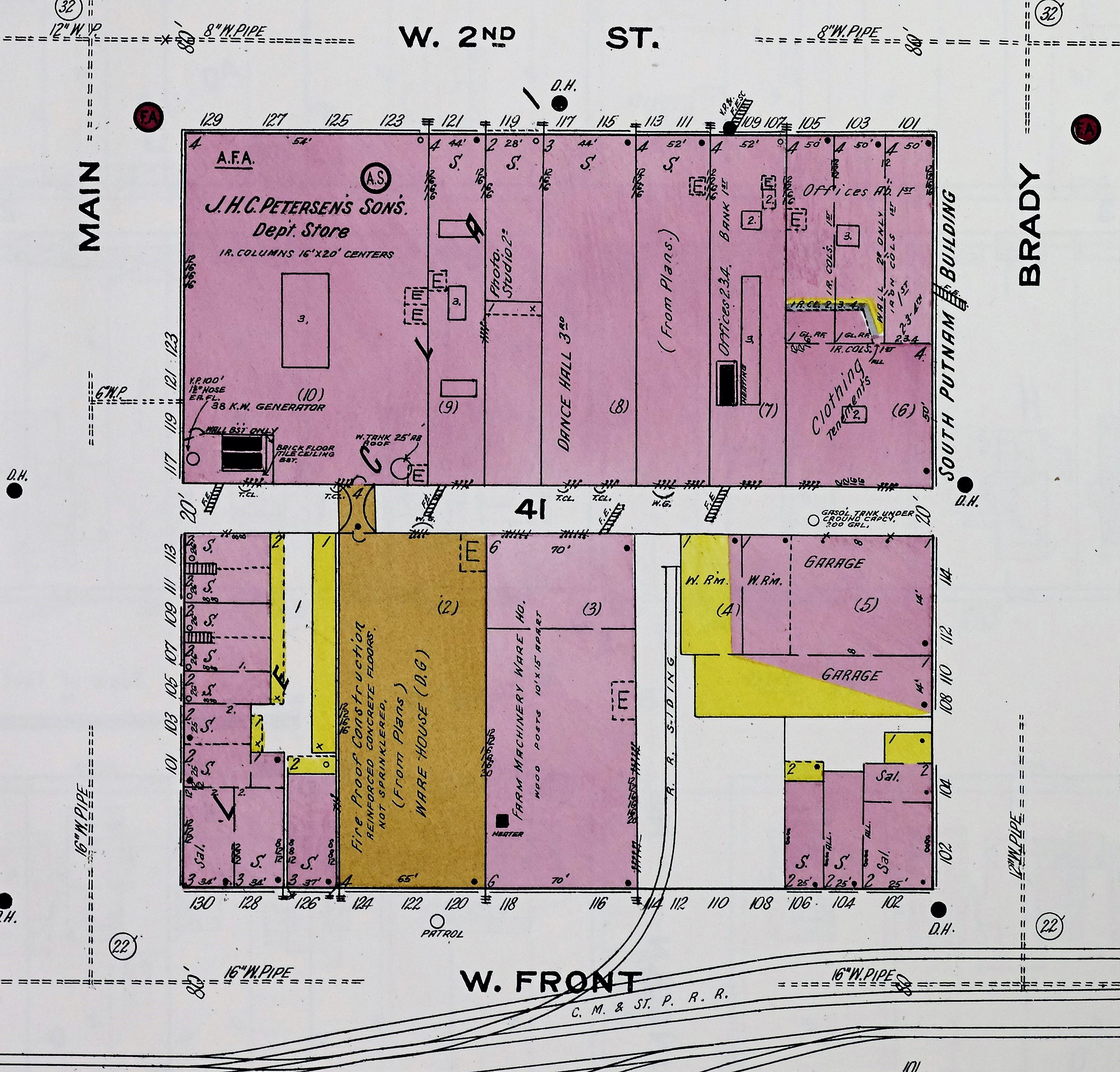
1910 Sanborn Map shows the Schauder Hotel next to the J.H.C. Petersen's Sons Wholesale Building (gold) on the lower half of the block.

== History ==
Louis Schauder built the hotel in 1876. At the time it was one of five hotels in a two-block section of West Front Street (now West River Drive). Schauder also operated the neighboring Perry Hotel. A saloon and music hall operated in the hotel by the 1880s. The hotel continued in operation until the turn of the 20th century. Eventually the building was acquired by the Petersen, Harned, and Von Maur department store and used for storage. It, along with the neighboring Clifton-Metropolitan Hotel, the J.H.C. Petersen's Sons Wholesale Building and the Schick's Express and Transfer Co., were torn down to make way for a public parking structure and the Davenport Skybridge. It was delisted from the National Register in 2014.

== Architecture ==
The three-story commercial building featured a four-bay facade above the ground floor. The tall, narrow windows with the decorative window hoods on the second and third floors expressed the Italianate style. The ground floor had been updated in later years and the original cornice was either partially removed or replaced.
