= Koenig Building =

- U.S. National Register of Historic Places
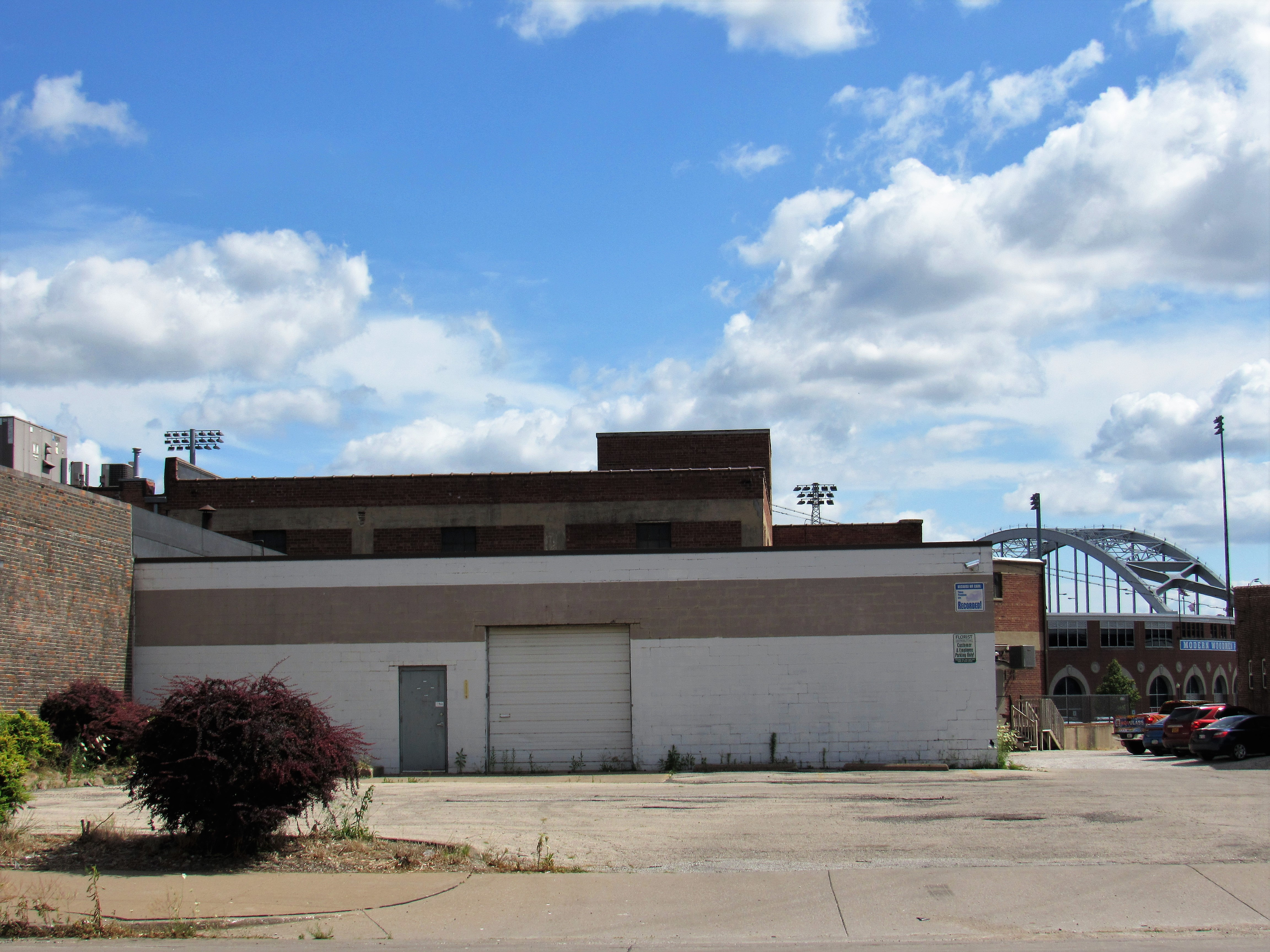
- Empty lot where the Koenig Building once stood.

- Location within Iowa Location within the United States
- Location: 619 W. 2nd St. Davenport, Iowa
- Coordinates: 41°31′16″N 90°34′56″W
- Built: 1872
- Architectural style: Italianate
- MPS: Davenport MRA
- NRHP reference No.: 83002460
- Added to NRHP: July 27, 1984

Koenig Building was a historic building located in downtown Davenport, Iowa, United States. The Italianate style commercial building was listed on the National Register of Historic Places in 1984. Augustus Koenig had this building constructed in 1872 for his daughters Pauline and Emma. They operated a millinery and fancy goods shop on the main floor and they lived in the apartments above. In later years the commercial space housed a tavern. The structure has subsequently been torn down and the property is now a surface parking lot.

The Koenig Building was a three-story brick structure. It featured a bracketed cornice with a curved pediment. The round-arch widows on the second and third floors had metal hoods with keystones. The building was typical of the city's Victorian commercial buildings.
