= Meiser Drug Store =

- U.S. National Register of Historic Places
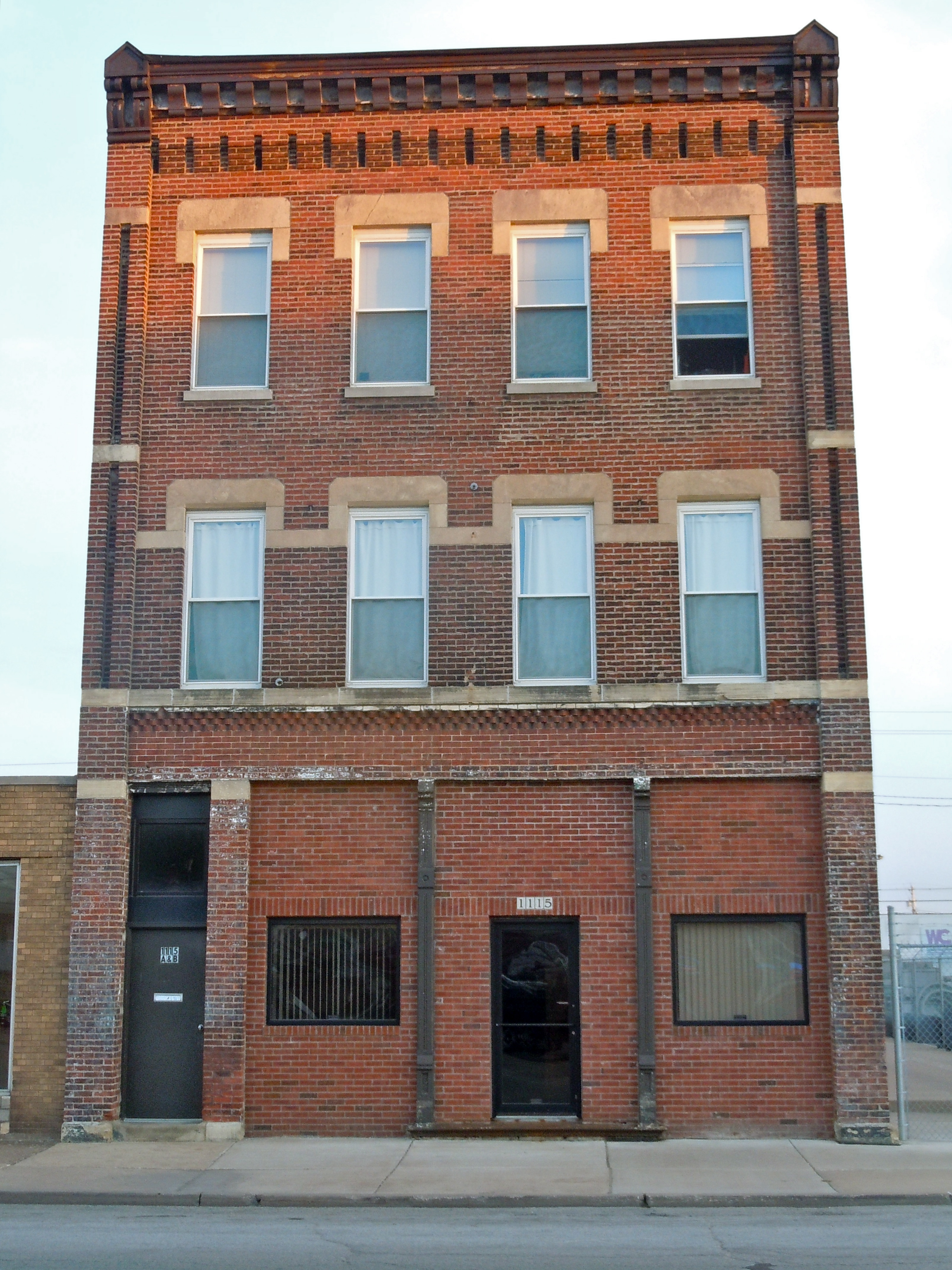

- Location within Iowa Location within the United States
- Location: 1115 W. 3rd St. Davenport, Iowa
- Coordinates: 41°31′20″N 90°35′23″W
- Area: less than one acre
- Built: 1888
- MPS: Davenport MRA
- NRHP reference No.: 83002470
- Added to NRHP: July 7, 1983

Meiser Drug Store is a historic building located in the West End of Davenport, Iowa, United States. It was built in 1888 and listed on the National Register of Historic Places in 1983. Amielius Meiser built this structure to house his drug store. He had previously operated an apothecary across the street, and he lived on the upper floors of both buildings. This building is noteworthy for the brick and metal cornice and the light colored stone used in the details.
