= Building at 1119–1121 W. Third Street =

- U.S. National Register of Historic Places
- Location within Iowa Location within the United States
- Location: 1119–1121 W. 3rd St. Davenport, Iowa
- Coordinates: 41°31′20″N 90°35′22″W
- Area: less than one acre
- Built: 1875
- Architectural style: Early Commercial
- MPS: Davenport MRA
- NRHP reference No.: 83002407
- Added to NRHP: July 7, 1983

The Building at 1119–1121 W. Third Street was a historic building located in the West End of Davenport, Iowa, United States. It was built in 1875 and featured elements of the Chicago School of architecture. The building was a three-story brick structure with flat arched windows. The third floor windows were shorter than those of the other two floors. The only decoration on the façade was brick corbelling at the cornice level and keystones over the windows. It was listed on the National Register of Historic Places in 1983. This combination commercial and residential rental property had been owned by a series of owners over the years. It has since been demolished and the property turned into a parking lot.

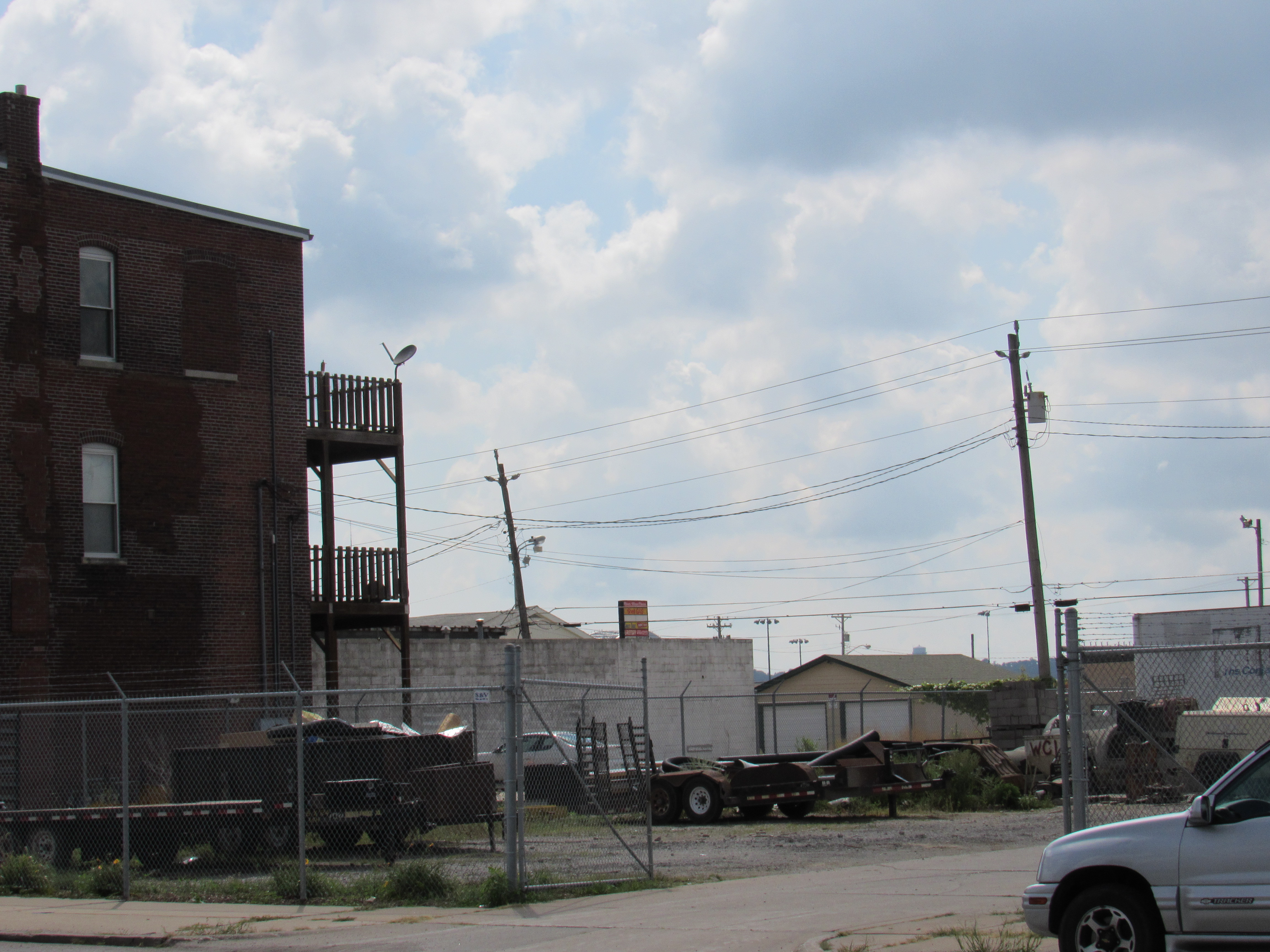
The building's location in 2017
