= Hauschild's Hall =

- Hauschild’s Hall
- U.S. National Register of Historic Places
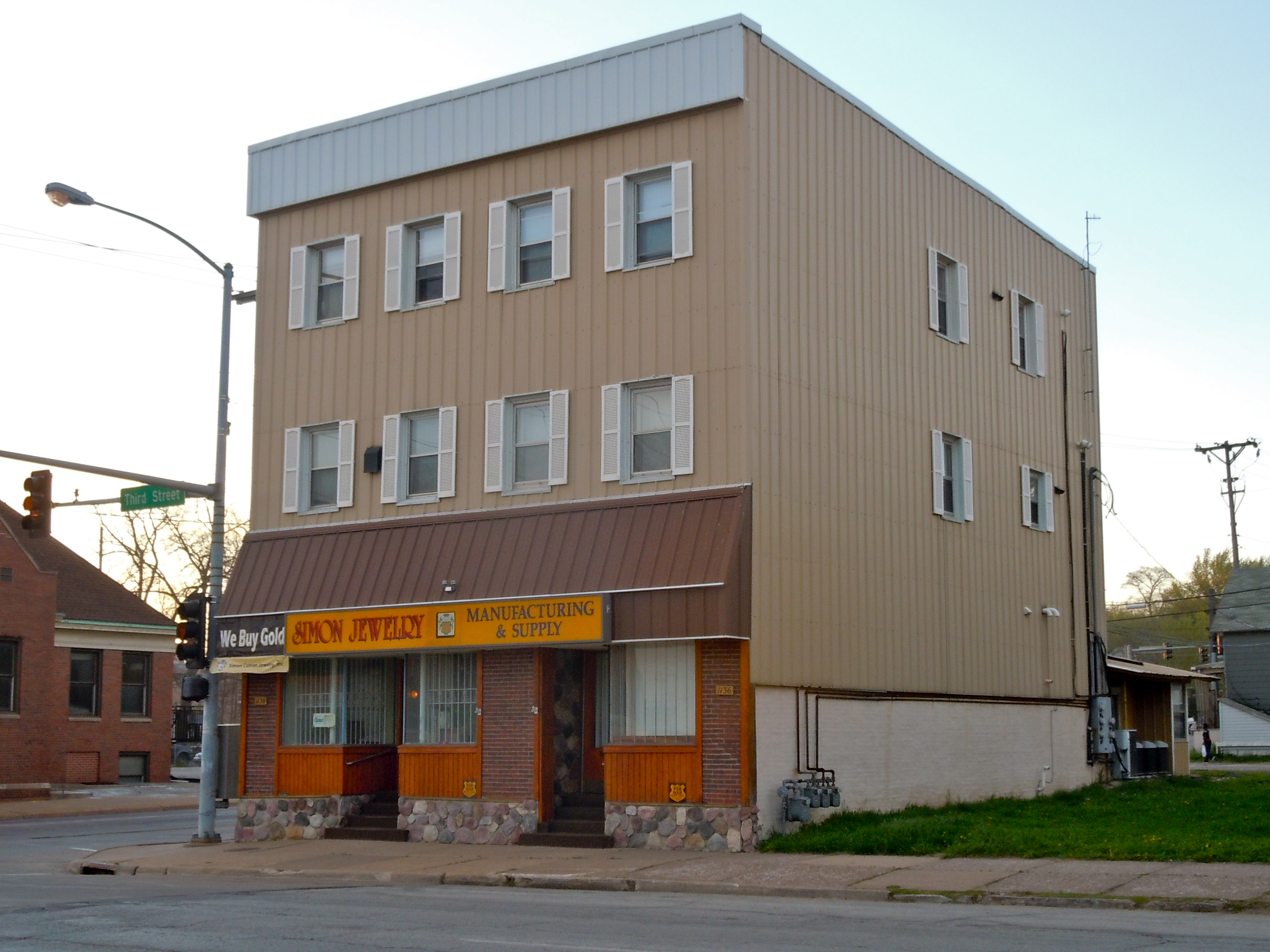
- Hauschild's Hall in 2011

- Location within Iowa Location within the United States
- Location: 1136 W. 3rd St. Davenport, Iowa
- Coordinates: 41°31′21″N 90°35′24″W
- Area: less than one acre
- Built: c. 1880
- MPS: Davenport MRA
- NRHP reference No.: 83002442
- Added to NRHP: July 7, 1983

Hauschild's Hall is a historic building located in the West End of Davenport, Iowa, United States. It was listed on the National Register of Historic Places in 1983. The building was constructed around 1880 in the German section of the city. It is a three-story commercial building with a store front on the main level and four bays on the upper floors. The window openings in the upper floors feature brick segmental arches with keystones and brick sills. The building was constructed in brick, but has subsequently been covered with siding. The cornice level of the building also features decorative brickwork that has also been covered.

The building served as the local headquarters of the German Knights of Labor. The local Chapter #2144 was organized in 1866 during a period of labor agitation and dissension within local labor groups.
