= International Harvester Truck Sales and Service Station =

- U.S. National Register of Historic Places
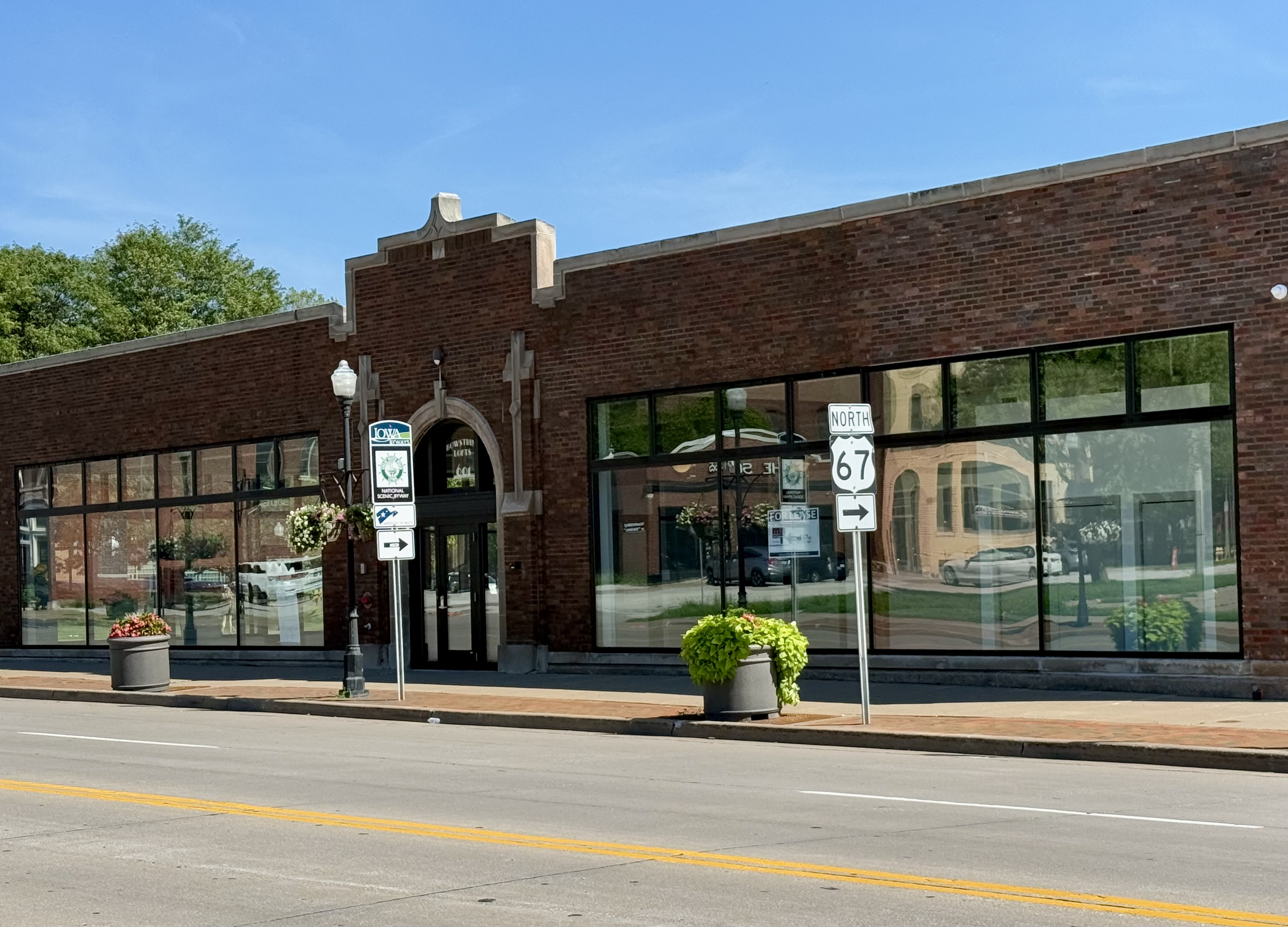
- Bowstring Lofts in 2025

- Location within Iowa Location within the United States
- Location: 601 W. 2nd St. Davenport, Iowa
- Coordinates: 41°31′15.7″N 90°34′54.8″W
- Area: less than one acre
- Built: 1927
- NRHP reference No.: 100011580
- Added to NRHP: March 31, 2025

The International Harvester Truck Sales and Service Station, also known as Bowstring Lofts, is a historic building located in downtown Davenport, Iowa, United States. International Harvester had the building built in 1927 for their first truck sales and service facility. For forty years it housed flower wholesaler Tri-City Florist Supply and Florist Distributing Inc. In 2024, the building opened as Bowstring Lofts. Its name comes from the arched steel roof support structures that are known as bowstring trusses, which are generally used to span longer distances in buildings and bridges. It was listed on the National Register of Historic Places in 2025.
