= House at 318–332 Marquette Street =

- U.S. National Register of Historic Places
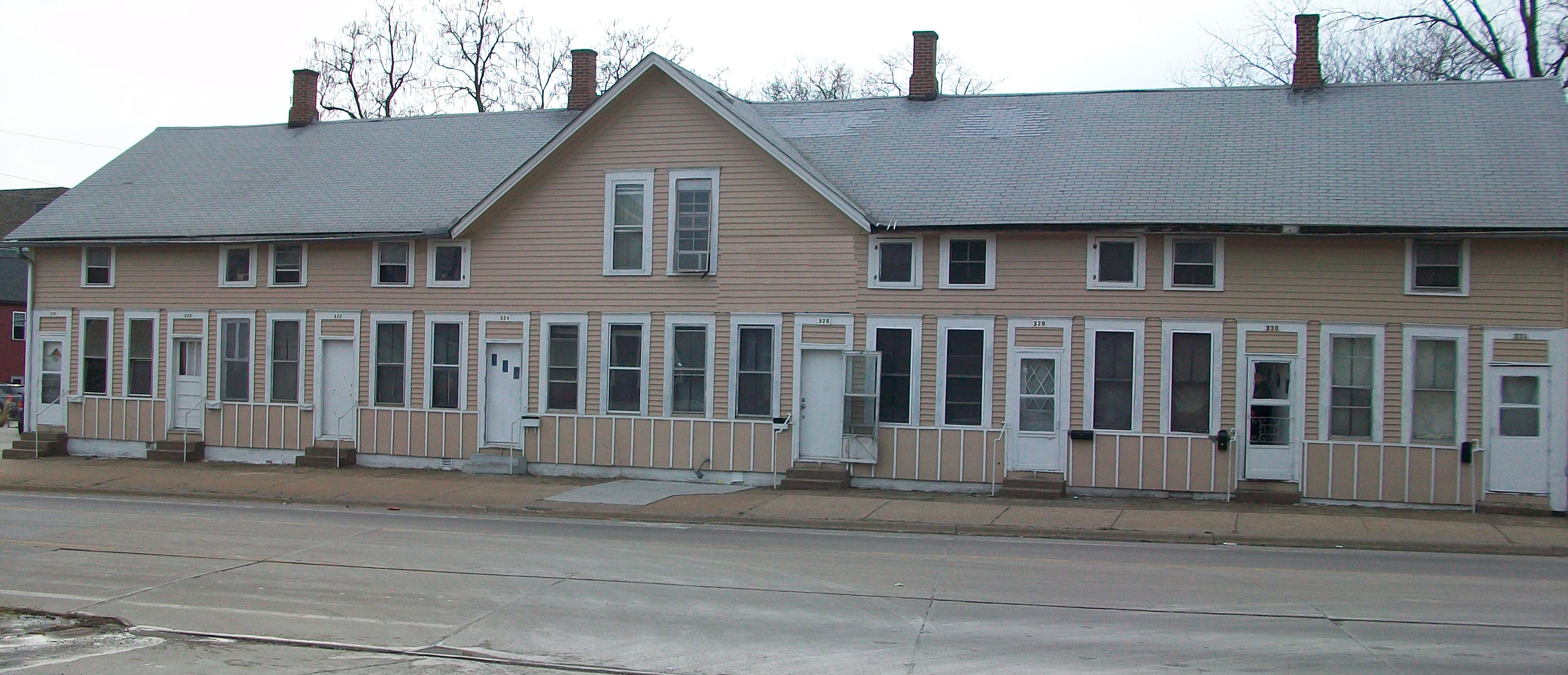

- Location within Iowa Location within the United States
- Location: 318–332 Marquette St. Davenport, Iowa
- Coordinates: 41°31′22″N 90°35′27″W
- Area: less than one acre
- Built: 1870
- MPS: Davenport MRA
- NRHP reference No.: 83002454
- Added to NRHP: July 7, 1983

The house at 318–332 Marquette Street is a historic building located in the West End of Davenport, Iowa, United States. The multiple-dwelling residential building was built by Lorenz Wahl who operated a grocery store. It has eight units, which housed mainly short term tenants over the years. The building is a 1½ story, side gable structure with small windows below the eaves. The units are symmetrically arranged with a door on the front and two windows to the side. While rare today, it was a common housing option in the years before and after the American Civil War when poor immigrants and laborers were moving into the city and created a housing shortage. It has been listed on the National Register of Historic Places since 1983.
