= Henry Berg Building =

- U.S. National Register of Historic Places
- U.S. Historic district – Contributing property
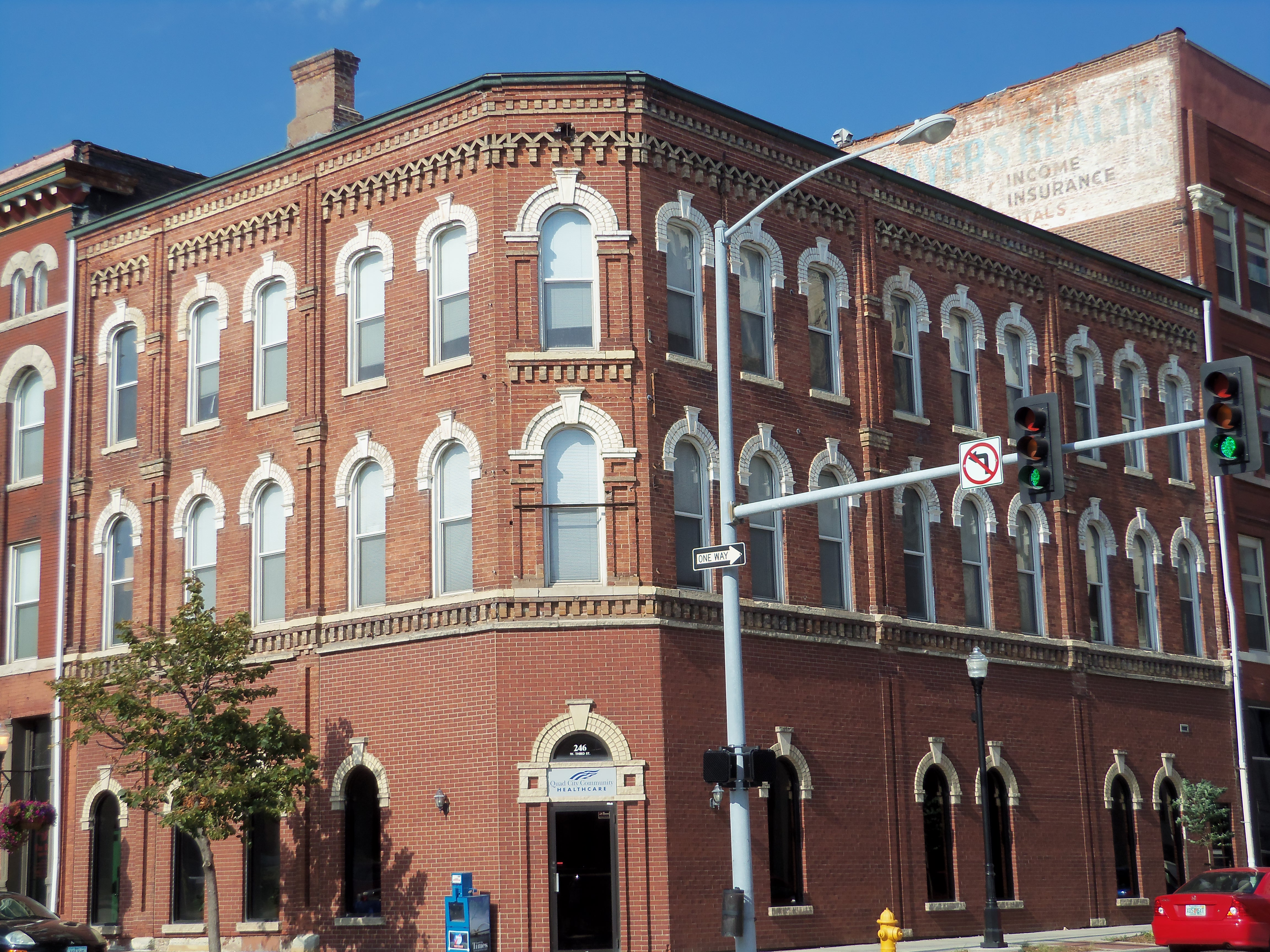
- Henry Berg Building in 2012

- Location within Iowa Location within the United States
- Location: 246 W. 3rd Street; Davenport, Iowa
- Coordinates: 41°31′22″N 90°34′36″W
- Area: less than one acre
- Built: 1874
- Architectural style: Romanesque Revival
- Part of: Davenport Downtown Commercial Historic District (ID100005546)
- MPS: Davenport MRA
- NRHP reference No.: 83002400
- Added to NRHP: July 7, 1983

The Henry Berg Building is a historic building located in downtown Davenport, Iowa, United States. It has been individually listed on the National Register of Historic Places since 1983. In 2020 it was included as a contributing property in the Davenport Downtown Commercial Historic District.

== History ==
The building was built in 1874 by Henry Berg who was a gunsmith. He occupied the retail space until 1910. Other businesses that occupied the storefront include the Hickey Brothers Cigar Store Number 6, Griffins Confectionary, Davenport Brick and Tile Company, Suburban Home Mortgage, and Craton's Sporting Goods. The upper floors have been divided into apartments. It is one of the last mid-19th century Victorian commercial buildings that remains downtown.

== Architecture ==
The building is three stories with a cut corner and two richly detailed facades. It is constructed of brick, and it is considered one of the most visually interesting commercial buildings from Davenport's mid-Victorian mercantile history. The corner entrance faces the intersection of West Third and Harrison Streets. Both facades feature three bays on the upper stories. The south elevation, which faces Third Street, has three windows in each bay. The west elevation, which faces Harrison Street, has two bays with double windows and one with single windows. The widow heads on the first and second floors are all arched and those on the third floor are flat arched. All the windows feature hoods of turned bricks and keystones. The Romanesque Revival style is found predominantly in the arched windows. It reflects the Rundbogenstil, or round-arched style, that was brought from Europe with German immigrants.

The upper stories of the building also feature decorative brickwork, which is the distinctive feature of the building. Turned bricks separate the main floor from the second floor. Paired pilasters with simplified capitals define the bays. The cornice at the top of the building is constructed of turned bricks layered in rows, to create an ornate pattern. The ground floor has been modified over the years.
