= J.H.C. Petersen's Sons' Store =

- J. H. C. Petersen's Sons' Store
- U.S. National Register of Historic Places
- U.S. Historic district – Contributing property
- Davenport Register of Historic Properties
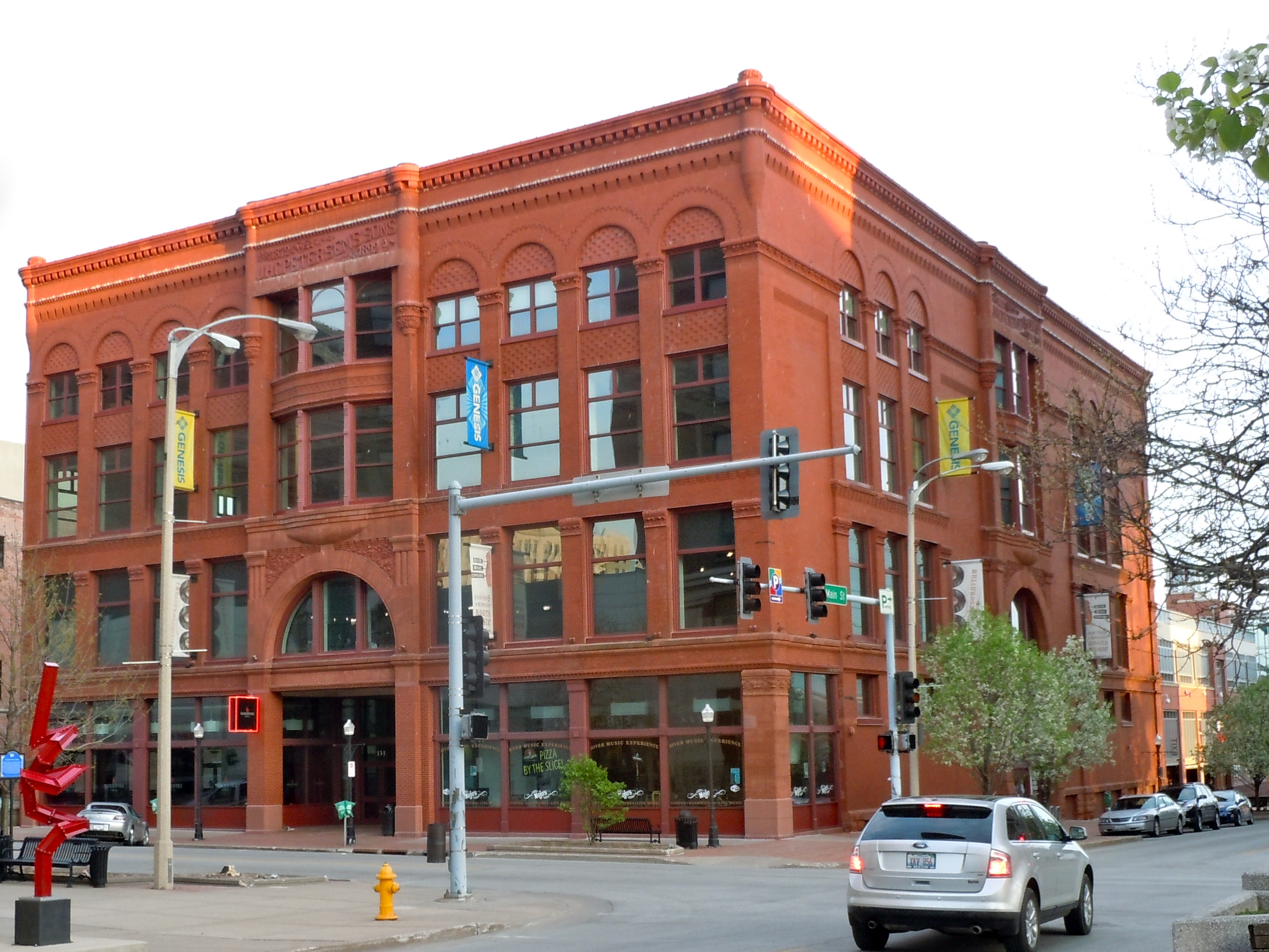

- Location within Iowa Location within the United States
- Location: 123-131 W. 2nd St. Davenport, Iowa
- Coordinates: 41°31′16″N 90°34′31″W
- Area: less than one acre
- Built: 1892
- Architect: Frederick G. Clausen
- Architectural style: Commercial Romanesque
- Part of: Davenport Downtown Commercial Historic District (ID100005546)
- MPS: Davenport MRA
- NRHP reference No.: 83002483
- DRHP No.: 38

Significant dates
- Added to NRHP: July 07, 1983
- Designated DRHP: November 7, 2001

The J.H.C. Petersen's Sons' Store also known as the Petersen Harned-Von Maur Store Building and the Redstone Building, is a historic building in Davenport, Iowa, United States. It was individually listed on the Davenport Register of Historic Properties and on the National Register of Historic Places. In 2020 it was included as a contributing property in the Davenport Downtown Commercial Historic District. The former department store building was modeled on the Rookery Building in Chicago.

== History ==
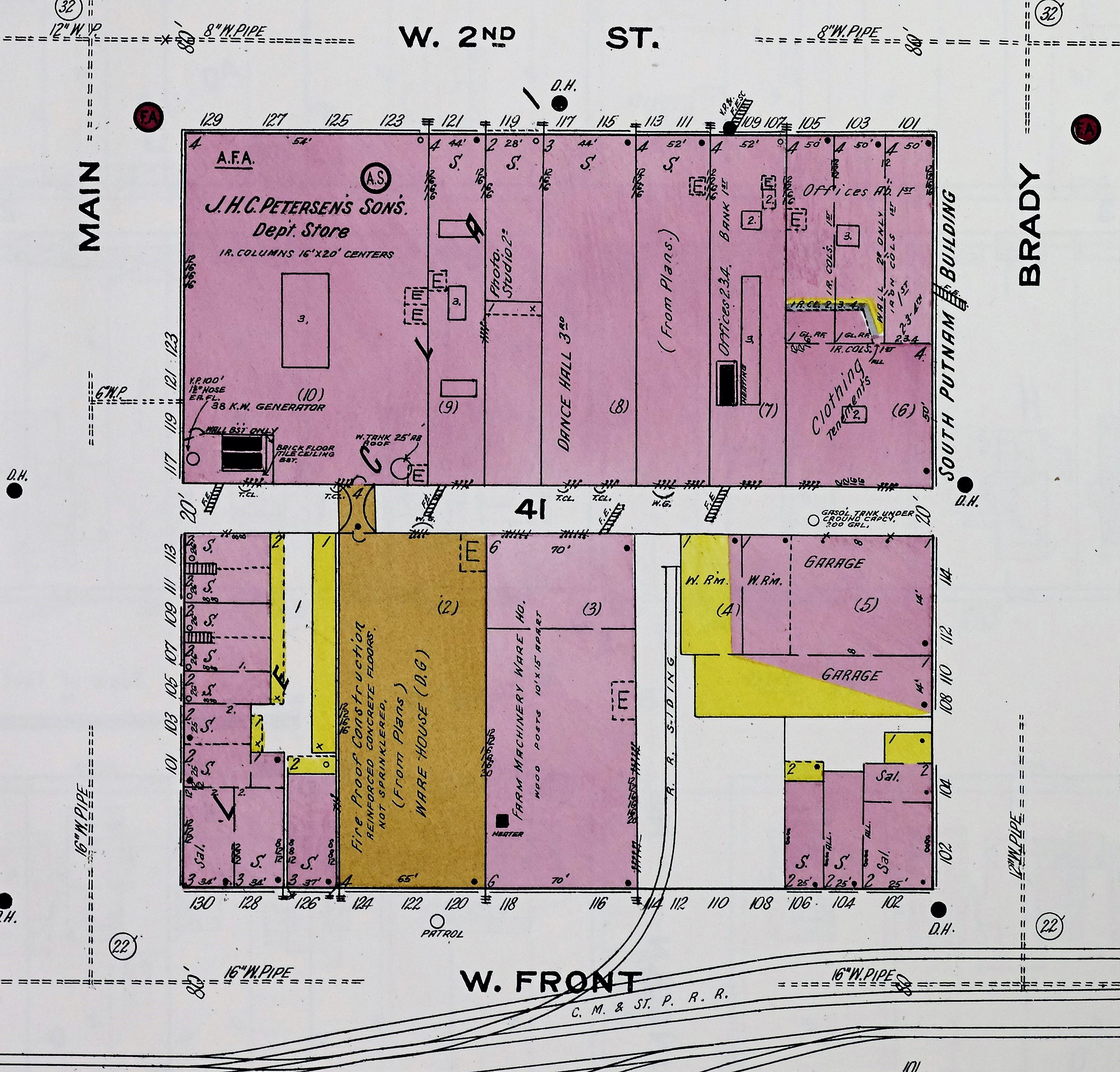
1910 Sanborn Map shows the original store building in the upper left corner of the block. Note the three storefronts immediately to the right and the warehouses across the alley were eventually incorporated into the store.

J.H.C. Petersen was an immigrant from Schleswig in present-day Germany where he was educated until he was 16. After settling in Scott County, Iowa he worked in farming and at a match-factory. He and his three sons Max, Henry, and William opened a dry goods store in 1872. By 1875 they were handling both wholesale and retail lines of merchandise from Chicago. Branch stores were opened in Clinton, Iowa and Geneseo, Illinois in the 1880s. The J.H.C. Petersen's Sons' Store was built in Downtown Davenport in 1892. The structure was designed by Frederick G. Clausen, a German immigrant who moved to Davenport. It followed the latest marketing principles of the day with specialized departments under one roof. The three sons took over the store's operations at this time. During this same time period, several competitors established operations in the city. J.H.C. died in 1910 and Max and Henry died in 1915. The following year William sold the store to one of their competitors, Harned and Von Maur Co. In 1928 the J.H.C. Petersen's Sons' store was consolidated into the Petersen-Harned-Von Maur Store and it ceased independent operations. The Redstone Building, however, would continue to house the flagship store well into the 20th century, keeping the Petersen name until 1989. The name of the department store chain, which expanded in several Midwest states, was simplified to Von Maur.

== Today ==
In June 2004, the River Music Experience opened in the Redstone Building. The River Music Experience is a non-profit museum focused on music, including jazz and blues, inspired by the river. A couple of years after opening, the River Music Experience focused more on live performances on the second floor. The River Music Experience sponsors an annual music festival, River Roots Live, in Downtown Davenport along with Ribfest, each summer. Today the building also features Mojo's coffee shop, a restaurant, and office space.

== Architecture ==
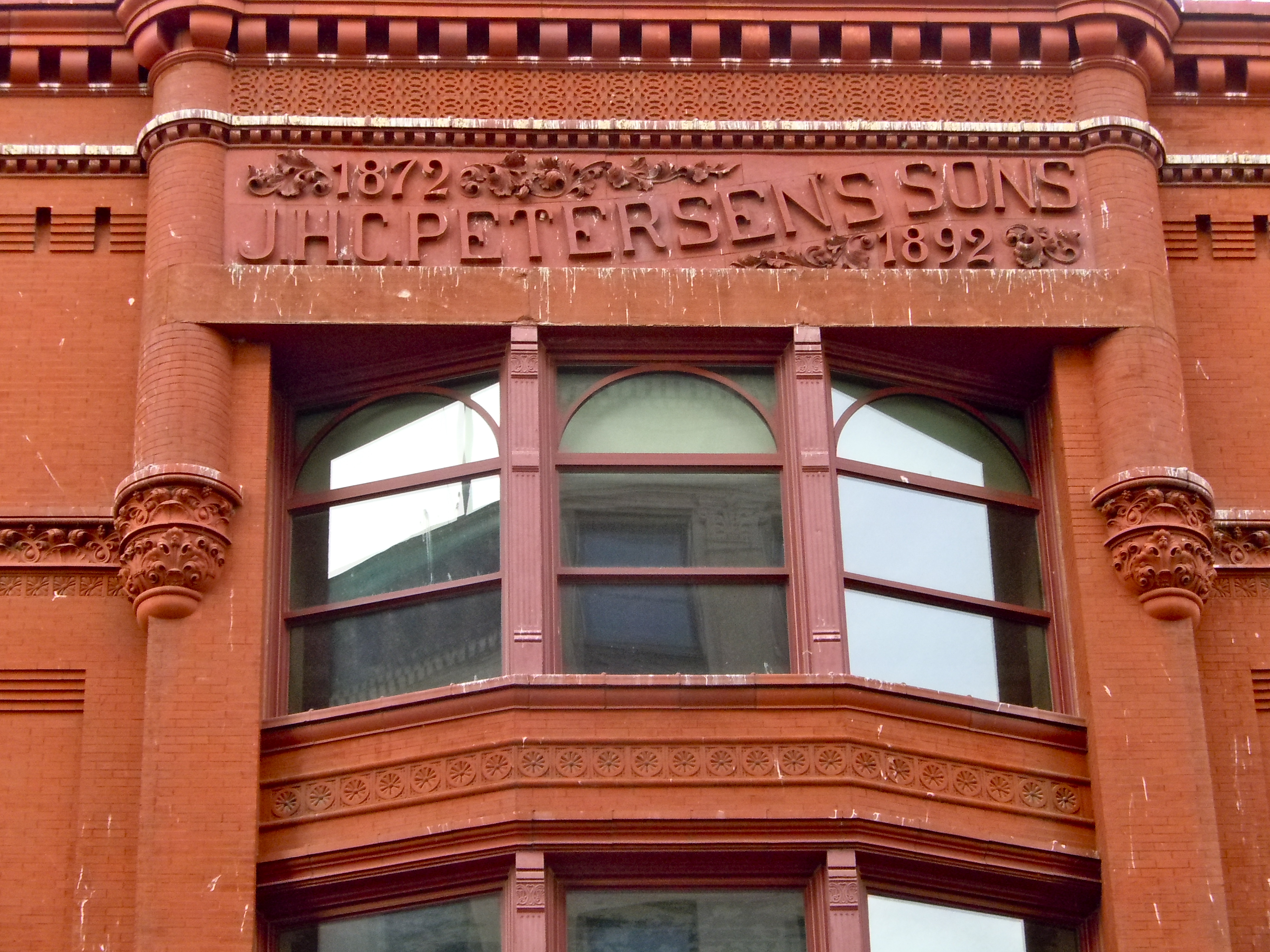
Facade detail over the main entry

The Petersen's Sons Store is a small-scale version of Burnham & Root's Rookery Building in Chicago. It is a local example of the late 19th-century development of the department store. The structure is four stories in height and built of stone on a brick foundation. It features round-arched arcades around groups of vertical windows and the nameplate decorated in terracotta on a slightly projecting entrance frontispiece. Diaperwork spandrels are located between the windows. The building culminates in elaborate parapets with oversized finials. At the roofline is a traditional brick cornice and the spandrels above the third floor arches are plain. The first floor storefronts were altered, but have since been restored.

== See also ==
Other buildings that were a part of the Petersen, Harned, von Maur complex:

- J.H.C. Petersen's Sons Wholesale Building
- Clifton-Metropolitan Hotel
- Schick's Express and Transfer Co.
- Schauder Hotel
