= Sainte Genevieve (dredge) =

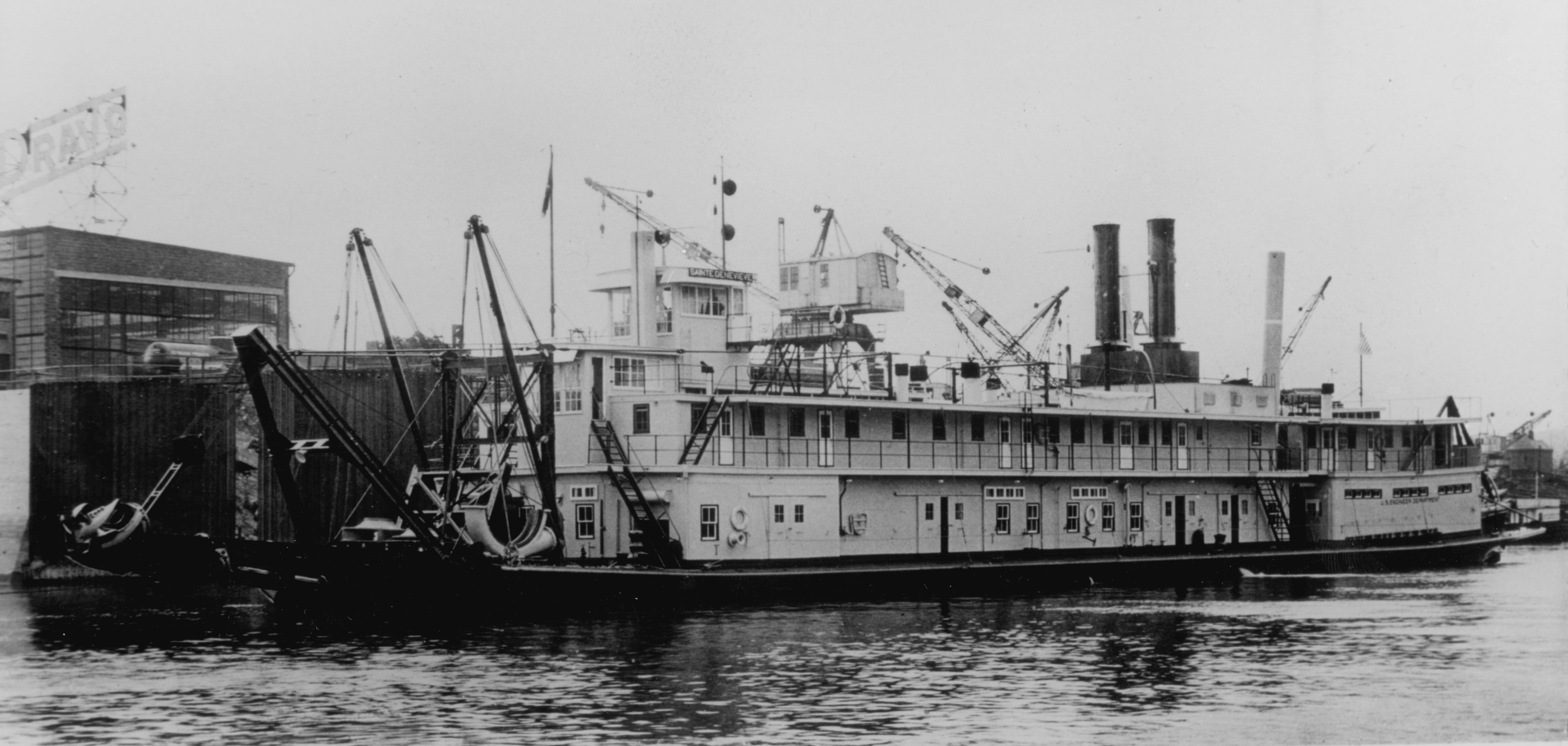

History
- Owner: United States Army Corps of Engineers
- Builder: Dravo Contracting Co.
- Launched: 1932
- Fate: Sank 1994

General characteristics
- Tonnage: 947 tons
- Displacement: 1,390 tons
- Length: 265.17 ft (80.82 m)
- Draft: 5.5 ft (1.7 m)
- Depth: 8 ft (2.4 m)
- SAINTE GENEVIEVE (dredge)
- Formerly listed on the U.S. National Register of Historic Places
- Location within Iowa
- Location: Antoine LeClaire Park at 400 W. Beiderbecke Drive, Davenport, Iowa
- Coordinates: 41°31′6″N 90°34′31″W
- Architectural style: Cutterhead dredge
- MPS: Davenport MRA
- NRHP reference No.: 86002232

Significant dates
- Added to NRHP: August 4, 1986
- Removed from NRHP: March 7, 2019

Sainte Genevieve, also known as The Genny, was a steam-powered Cutterhead dredge. At the time she was listed on the National Register of Historic Places in 1986, she was located on the Mississippi River along the levee near downtown Davenport, Iowa, United States.

== History ==
The boat was built by the Dravo Contracting Co. of Pittsburgh, Pennsylvania in 1932. She was Hull #1139 and weighed 947 tons. The Sainte Genevieve had a steel hull and a superstructure of wood with steel for strengthening. Between 1963 and 1973, 97% of her hull bottom and 71% of her sides were replated. Her paint scheme of grey and ivory with trim colours of dark red, black, and grey was consistent Mississippi River to keep it open to barge traffic. She was the last sternwheel vessel and the last steam-powered dredge operated by the Corps when she retired in 1984. She was given to the city of Davenport for use as a tourist attraction. Plans were to turn her into a dockside restaurant, a floating museum, or a bed and breakfast. Those plans were never realized, and she left Davenport in October 1990 for a new home on the Missouri River in St. Charles, Missouri, where there were plans to turn her into a museum, but that plan never materialized. The Sainte Genevieve sank in 1992 near Cairo, Illinois. She was raised and sank again in Cape Girardeau, Missouri in 1994. She was reportedly scrapped. The vessel was delisted from the National Register of Historic Places in 2019.
