= Philip Worley House =

Historic house in Iowa, United States

- Phillip Worley House
- U.S. National Register of Historic Places
- U.S. Historic district – Contributing property
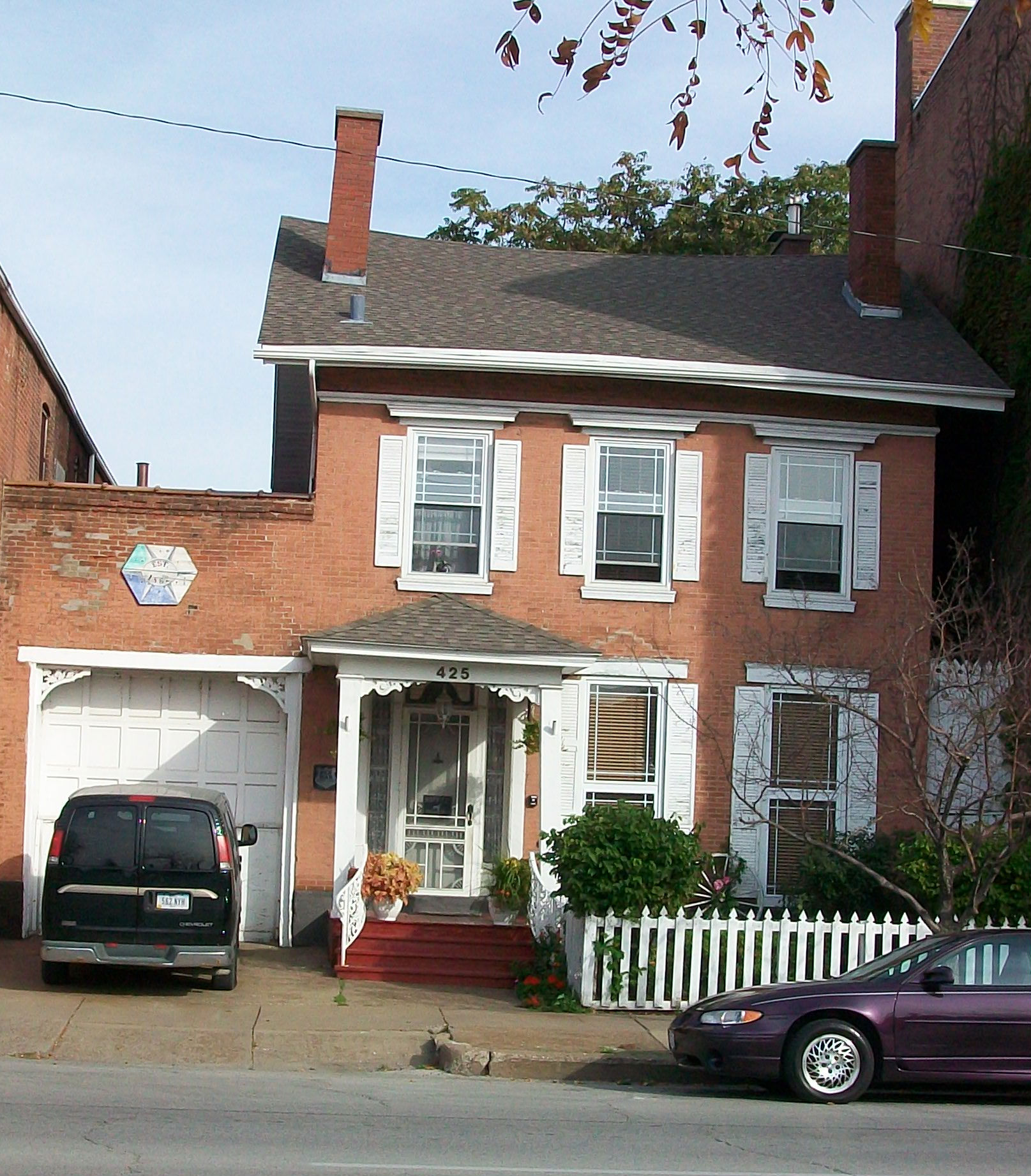

- Location within Iowa Location within the United States
- Location: 425 Brady Street; Davenport, Iowa
- Coordinates: 41°31′27″N 90°34′26″W
- Area: less than one acre
- Built: 1860
- Architectural style: Greek Revival
- Part of: Davenport Downtown Commercial Historic District (ID100005546)
- MPS: Davenport MRA
- NRHP reference No.: 83002524
- Added to NRHP: July 7, 1983

The Phillip Worley House is a historic building located in downtown Davenport, Iowa, United States. It was individually listed on the National Register of Historic Places since 1983. In 2020 it was included as a contributing property in the Davenport Downtown Commercial Historic District.

== History ==
In 1860, Dr. Phillip Worley built a residence for his family in the 400 block of Brady Street. At the same time, he built the one-story structure that is attached to the north side of the house to serve as his office. It is now a garage. His son, Dr. H.A. Worley, later lived and practiced medicine here until 1882 when his other son Charles Worley lived in this house and operated a stable in the building to the north. By 1910 the Worley family no longer lived in the residence and it was being used as a boarding house. It is a rare example of a mid-19th century single-family house in the downtown area. The house and former stable are now used as living space. The neighboring Hibernia Hall building is now used for commercial space and residential apartments. At one time they all housed an antique store.

== Architecture ==
The Worley House is a two-story, Greek Revival, brick structure that was built on what is likely a stone foundation. The Greek revival elements, which is why this residence is considered significant, include a boxy form, side-gable roofline, elongated first story windows, and hipped porch roof. The home also features an off-center front entrance and two windows on the first floor. There are three windows on the second floor that line up with the openings of the first. Wood shutters frame the sides of all the windows.
