= Building at 813–815 W. Second Street =

- U.S. National Register of Historic Places
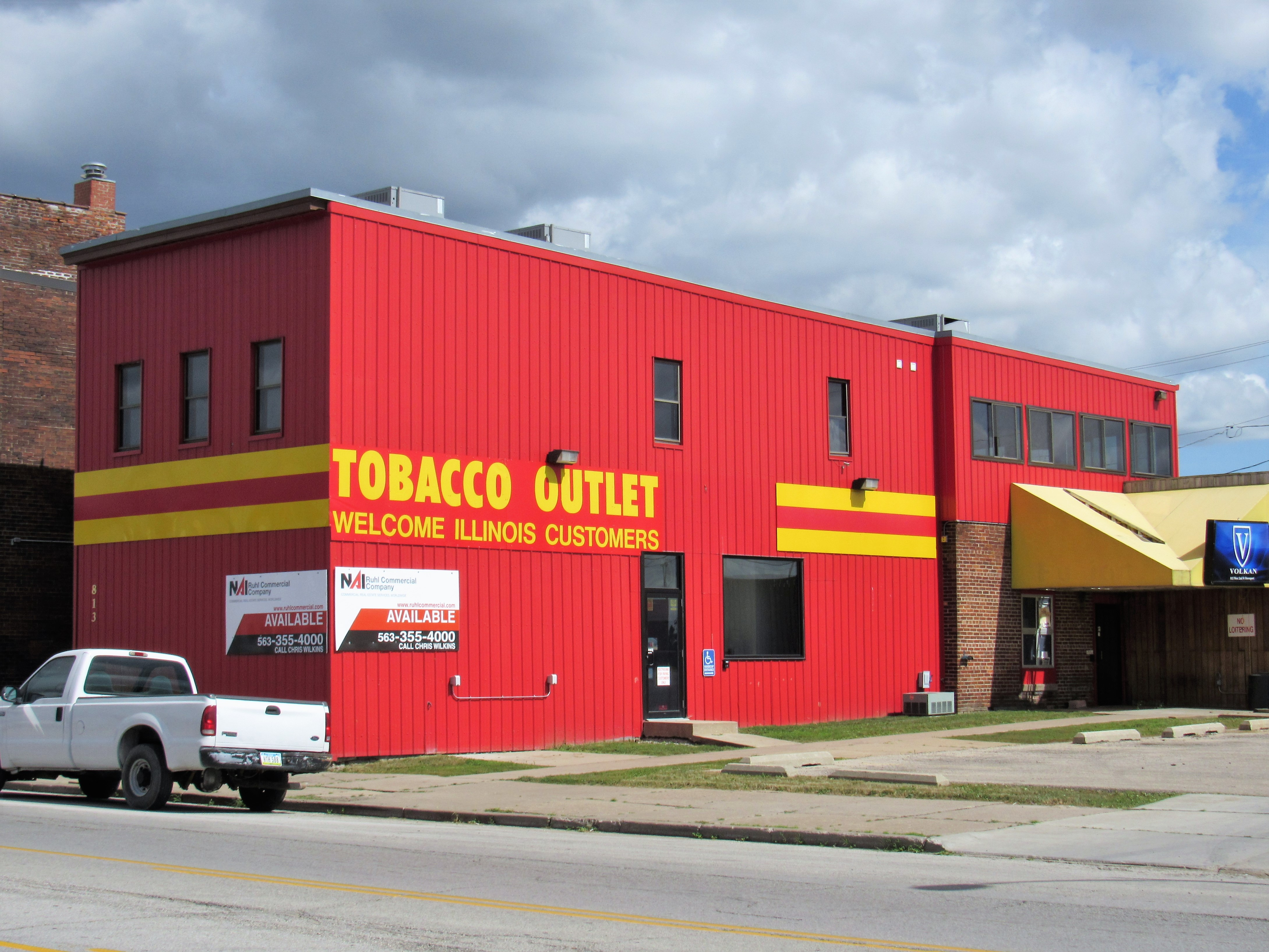

- Location within Iowa Location within the United States
- Location: 813–815 W. 2nd St. Davenport, Iowa
- Coordinates: 41°31′16″N 90°35′6″W
- Area: less than one acre
- Built: c. 1900
- Architectural style: Classical Revival
- MPS: Davenport MRA
- NRHP reference No.: 83002408
- Added to NRHP: July 7, 1983

Building at 813–815 W. Second Street is a historic building located near downtown Davenport, Iowa, United States. It was listed on the National Register of Historic Places in 1983. The building was built by Lorenz Wahle who was an associate in the German Savings Bank and had formerly worked as a grocer. The date of the building's construction is difficult to discern as the Wahle family owned two buildings on this site between 1870 and 1920. It is significant for its vaguely Neoclassical cast concrete facade, now hidden by metal siding, which is a unique feature in the city. The structure served as a warehouse until it was renovated in 2003 as a gay nightclub named "Club Fusion." In 2012, after the building had been empty for a few years, it was bought and converted into a convenience store and a bar.
