= Old City Hall (Davenport, Iowa) =

- U.S. National Register of Historic Places
- U.S. Historic district – Contributing property
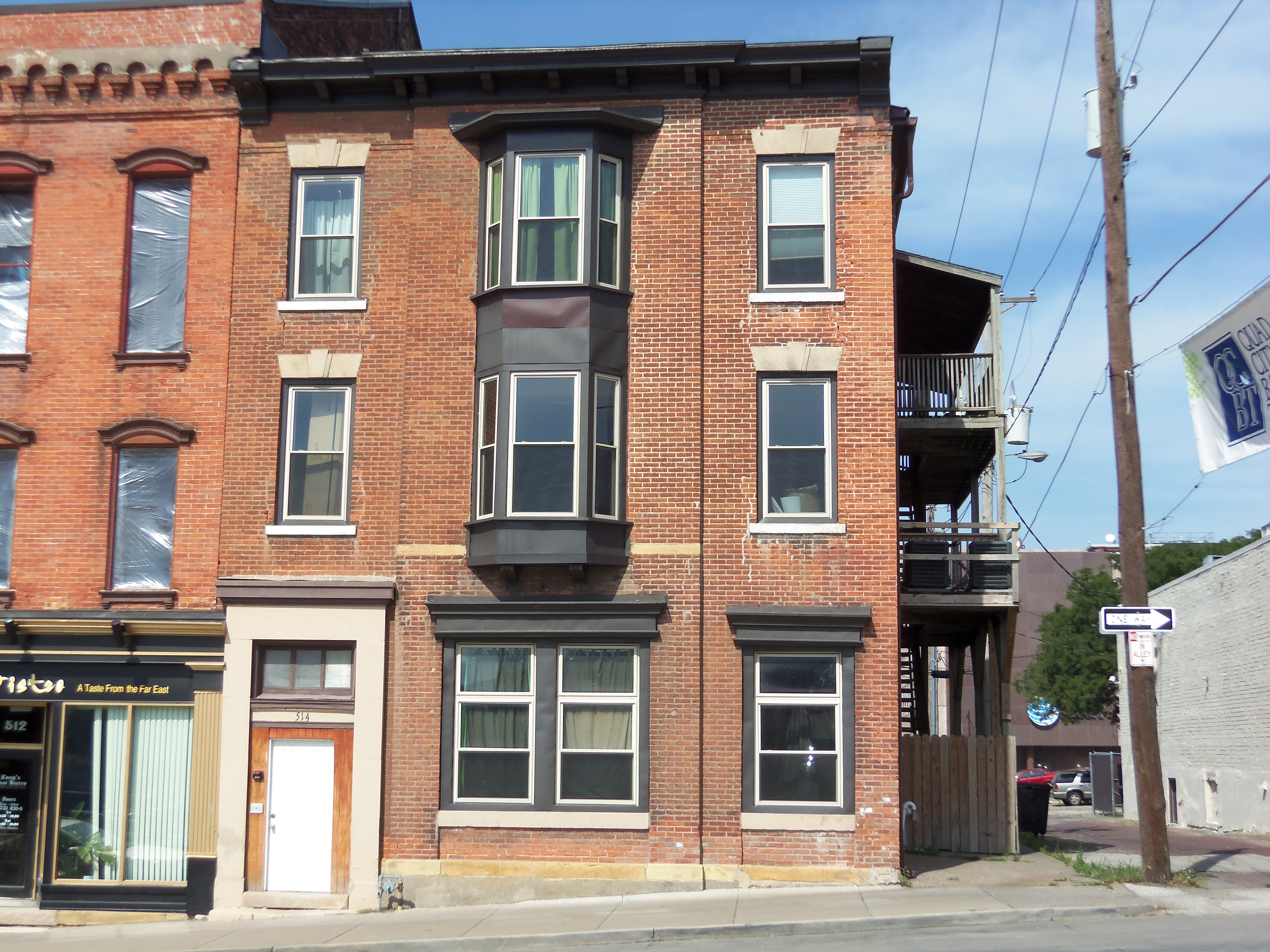
- Old City Hall in 2012

- Location within Iowa Location within the United States
- Location: 514 Brady St. Davenport, Iowa
- Coordinates: 41°31′31″N 90°34′27″W
- Area: less than one acre
- Built: 1857
- Built by: J.G. Birtness
- Part of: Davenport Downtown Commercial Historic District (ID100005546)
- MPS: Davenport MRA
- NRHP reference No.: 83002479
- Added to NRHP: July 7, 1983

The Old City Hall, also known as Oxford Flats, is located just north of downtown along a commercial corridor in Davenport, Iowa, United States. It was individually listed on the National Register of Historic Places in 1983. In 2020 it was included as a contributing property in the Davenport Downtown Commercial Historic District.

== History ==
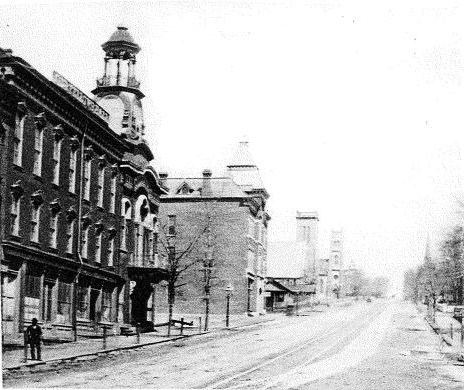
The first building with the tower on the left in this 1880 photo is the Old City Hall.

Designed by Davenport architect Willett Carroll, the building was built in 1857 as an engine house for a fire company. That year the city council rejected sites along Washington Square and Court House Square for a new city hall, so in early 1858 the engine house's hall became the council chambers and other municipal offices were moved into other sections of the building. It continued to be used as a combination city hall and fire station until Hose Station No. 1 was built in 1877. A significant number of local industrialists and professionals served as mayor when this building housed city hall. They include George B. Sargent (1857), Ebeneezer Cook (1858–59), Hiram Price (1859), George H. French (1861-1862), John L. Davies (1865-1866), Michael Donahue (1867-1868), John C. Bills (1871, 1882, 1892), Ernest Claussen (1883-1889), and C. A. Ficke (1890-1891). The current city hall was built in 1895 and five years later the city sold this building to John Ochs’ Sons realty. The building was converted around 1910 into a residential building containing six flats, and the structure was dramatically altered to its present appearance. It was renamed Oxford Flats and it reflected the trend of building apartment buildings on the edge of the downtown area. While the structure is the oldest building in Davenport that is associated with municipal government and politics, it remains an apartment building.

== Architecture ==
When it was originally built it exhibited elements of the Italian Renaissance Revival style, and it included a tower on top of the east elevation. It now reflects the Neoclassical style. The three-story, three bay, brick building was built on a stone foundation. The façade is dominated by a two-story polygonal oriel window that is ornamented with fleur-de-lis. The post and lintel entrance is on the left side of the east elevation, which is capped by a projecting cornice. The west elevation is topped with a half-hipped roof.
