= Clifton-Metropolitan Hotel =

Historic building in Davenport, Iowa, US

- Formerly listed on the U.S. National Register of Historic Places
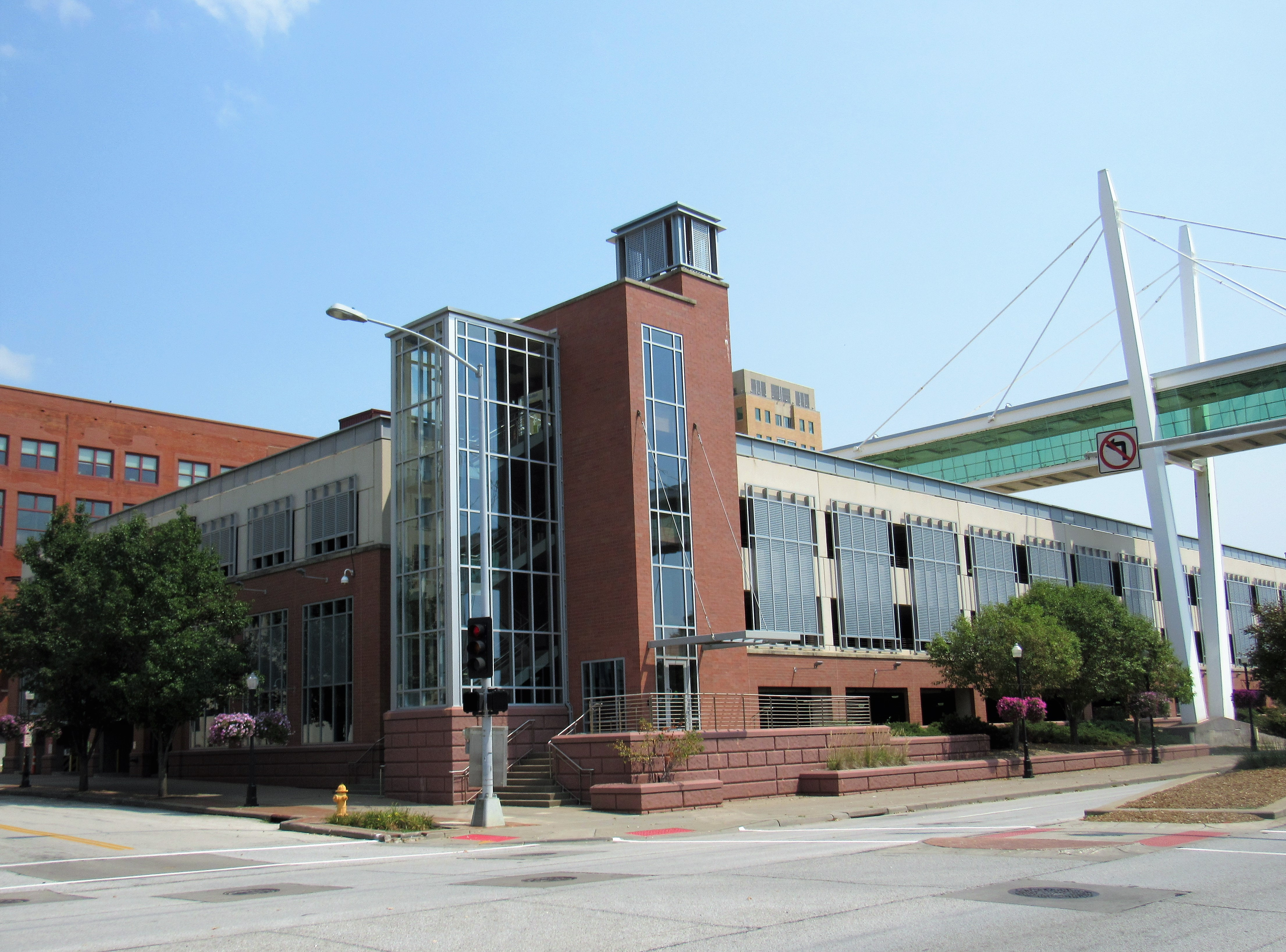
- The building was located at the corner where this parking ramp now stands.
- Location: 130 W. River Dr. Davenport, Iowa
- Area: less than one acre
- Built: 1841
- Architect: Henry Leonard
- Architectural style: Greek Revival
- MPS: Davenport MRA
- NRHP reference No.: 83002413

Significant dates
- Added to NRHP: July 7, 1983
- Removed from NRHP: November 12, 1997

Clifton-Metropolitan Hotel was a historic building located in downtown Davenport, Iowa, United States. The property was listed on the National Register of Historic Places in 1983. It has since been torn down and it was delisted from the National Register in 1997. The site on the corner of Main Street and River Drive, along with the neighboring site of the former Schauder Hotel, is now a public parking structure.

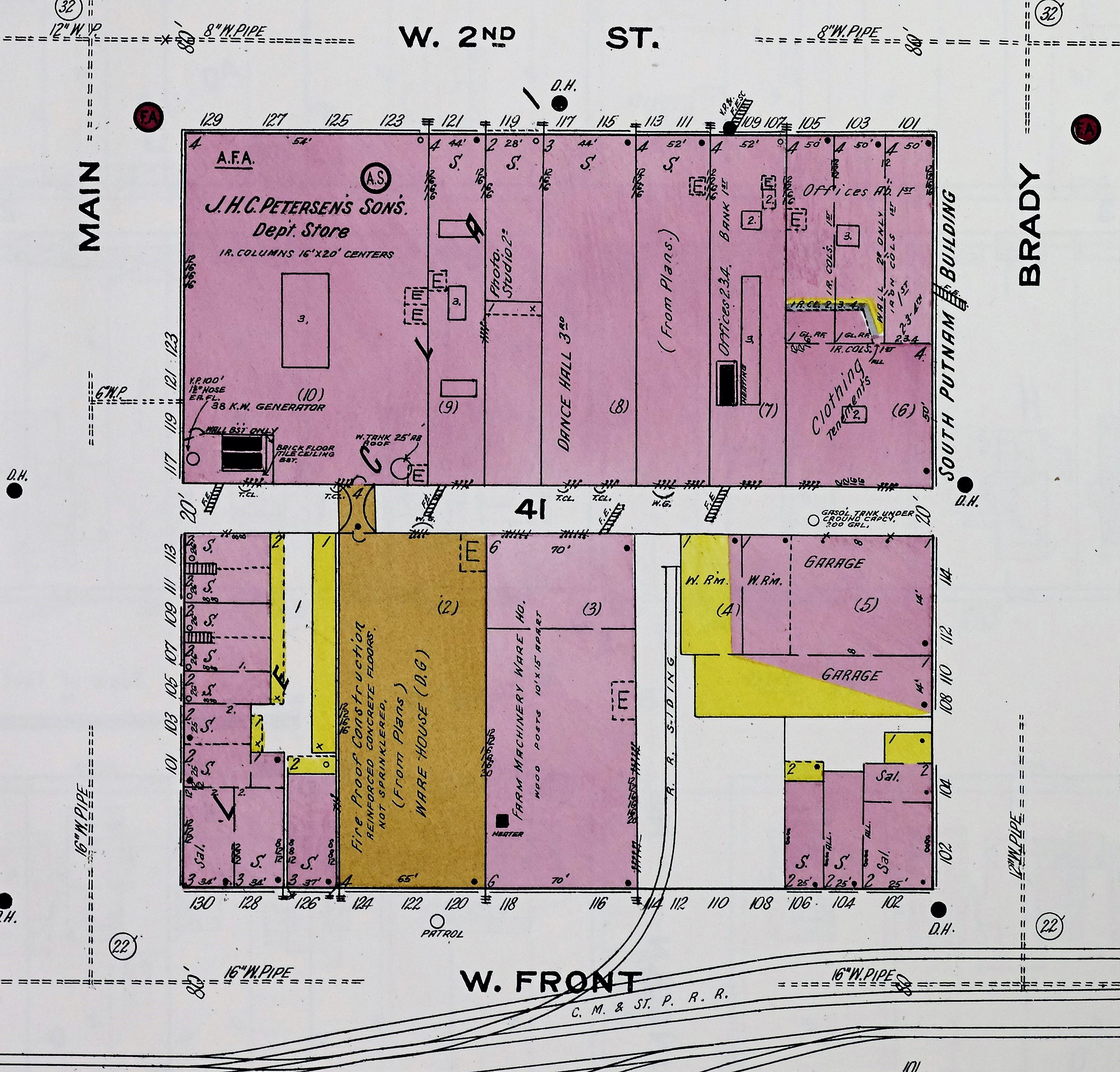
1910 Sanborn Map shows the Clifton-Metropolitan Hotel location on the corner of W. Front and Main Streets.

== History ==
The building was originally the G.L. Davenport store, which began business there in 1841. It was later the location of the Clifton-Metropolitan Hotel. The Clifton was part of the second phase of hotel construction and expansion in the city of Davenport, which lasted from about the time of the American Civil War until the early 20th-century. It was in business for several decades and lasted longer than most of its contemporaries. There is some evidence that the building may have housed a brothel after its service as a hotel. It was located on the edge of the city's notorious Bucktown District. Eventually, it became part of the Petersen Harned and Von Maur Department Store complex, where it was used for storage. The property passed to the President Riverboat Casino, who had plans for the building that never materialized.

== Demolition ==
The President Riverboat Casino planned to demolish the building in 1995 and threatened to sue if the preservationists voted to save the building. At the time it was torn down, to make way for the parking structure, it was the oldest commercial building in the city. The city ultimately rejected landmark status 8-to-1 and the building was demolished in November 1995.
