= Schick's Express and Transfer Co. =

- Formerly listed on the U.S. National Register of Historic Places
- Schick's Express and Transfer Co. building

- Location within Iowa Location within the United States
- Location: 118-120 W. River Dr. Davenport, Iowa
- Coordinates: 41°31′11″N 90°34′29″W
- Built: 1905
- Architect: Clausen & Clausen
- Architectural style: Early Commercial
- MPS: Davenport MRA
- NRHP reference No.: 83002497

Significant dates
- Added to NRHP: July 7, 1983
- Removed from NRHP: December 19, 2014

The Schick's Express and Transfer Co. was located in downtown Davenport, Iowa, United States. It was listed on the National Register of Historic Places in 1983. The building became part of the Petersen, Harned, von Maur department store complex.

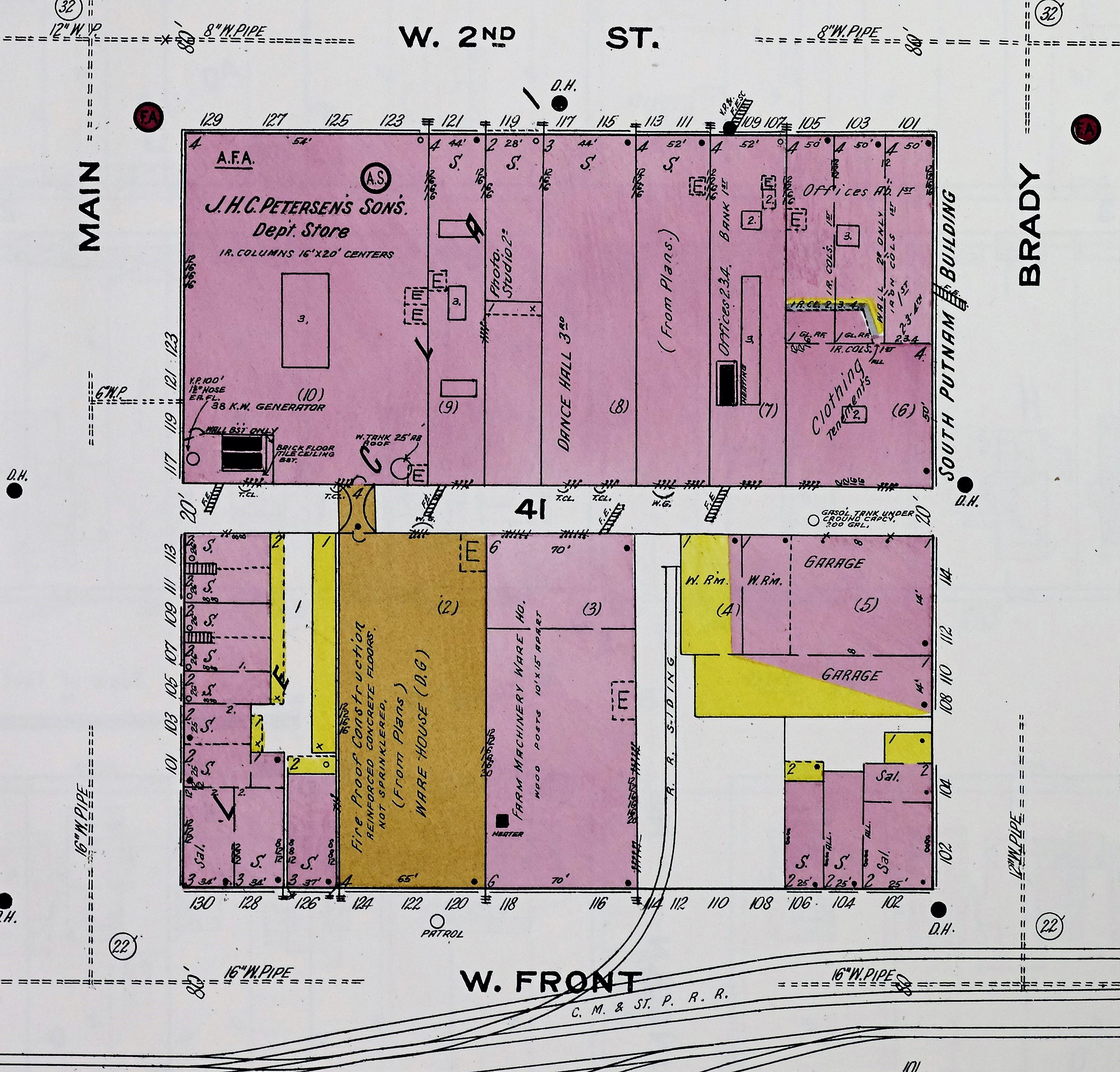
1910 Sanborn Map shows Schick's Express and Transfer Co. next to the J.H.C. Petersen's Sons Wholesale Building (gold) on the lower half of the block. The rail siding is next to this building.

== History ==
Schick's Express and Transfer Company built this warehouse for its new headquarters in 1905. It was located on Front Street (now River Drive) not far from the Chicago, Milwaukee, St. Paul and Pacific Freight House, which made access to transportation routes efficient. Eventually the building was acquired by the Petersen, Harned, and Von Maur Department Store for use as a warehouse. It and the J.H.C. Petersen's Sons Wholesale Building were torn down in the early 21st century to make way for a parking structure and the Davenport Skybridge. It was delisted from the National Register in 2014.

== Architecture ==
The building was an example of early Commercial architecture in Davenport. It was one of the few utilitarian buildings in Davenport that opened its walls with large windows, indicating the structure beneath its brick surface. It was also quite plain in appearance. The only decorative elements on the building were a restrained metal cornice, rustication at the corners, and stone jack arches.
