= Wupperman Block/I.O.O.F. Hall =

- U.S. National Register of Historic Places
- U.S. Historic district – Contributing property
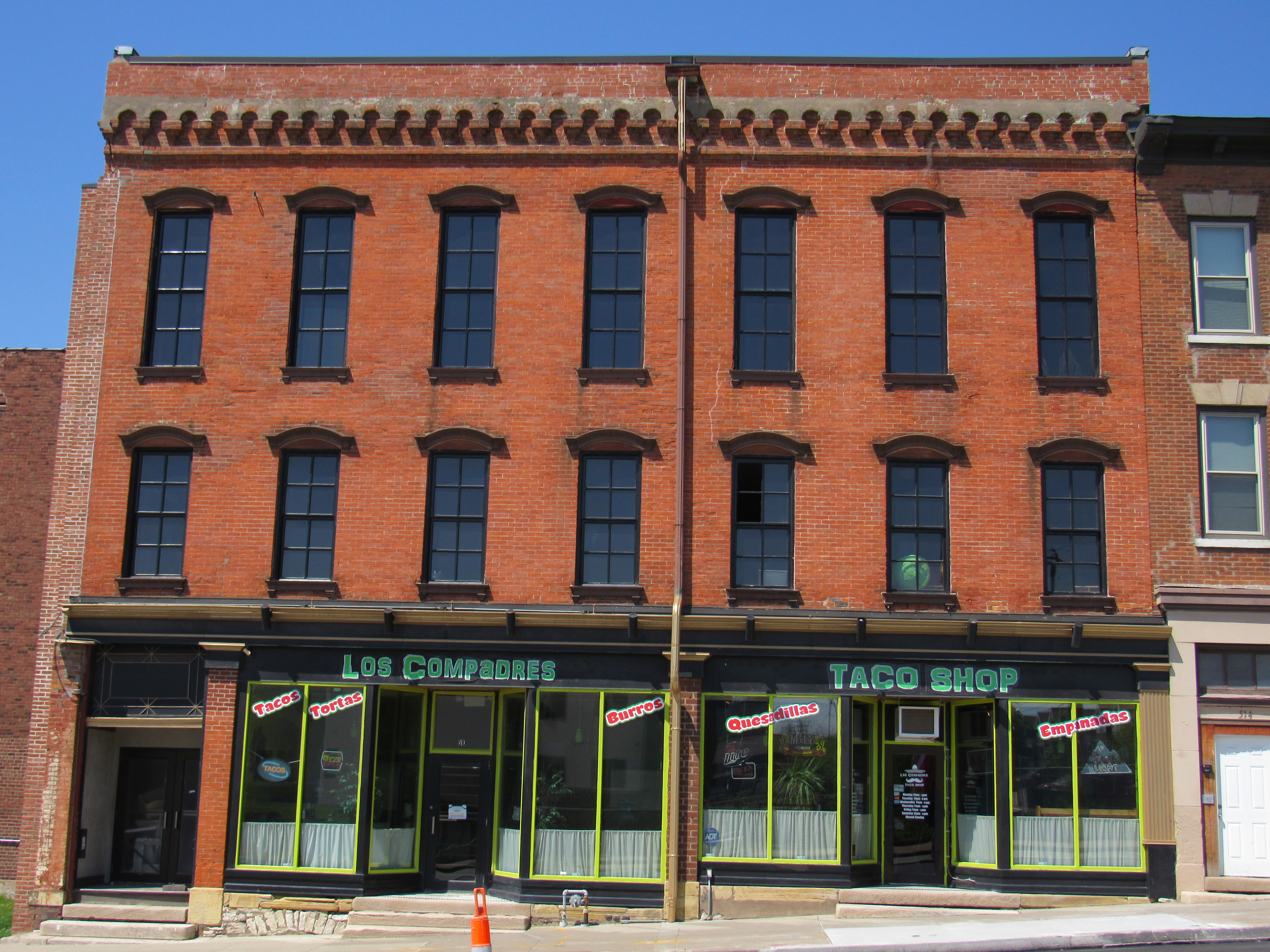
- Wupperman Block in 2017

- Location within Iowa Location within the United States
- Location: 508-512 Brady St. Davenport, Iowa
- Coordinates: 41°31′29.7″N 90°34′28″W
- Area: less than one acre
- Built: 1859
- Architectural style: Renaissance Revival
- Part of: Davenport Downtown Commercial Historic District (ID100005546)
- MPS: Davenport MRA
- NRHP reference No.: 83002525
- Added to NRHP: July 7, 1983

The Wupperman Block/I.O.O.F. Hall is a historic building located just north of downtown Davenport, Iowa, United States. It was individually listed on the National Register of Historic Places in 1983. In 2020 it was included as a contributing property in the Davenport Downtown Commercial Historic District.

== History ==
The building dates from 1859 when Hermann A. Wupperman built it to house his grocery store. He was in partnership with William P. Hall and their business was named Wupperman and Hall. The third floor was known as "Union Hall" before it was leased to Davenport Lodge No. 7 of the Independent Order of Odd Fellows (I.O.O.F.), who occupied the building for over one hundred years. During the Great Depression the Odd Fellows shared their space with other fraternal organizations. The storefronts on the first floor have been occupied by various businesses over the years.

== Architecture ==
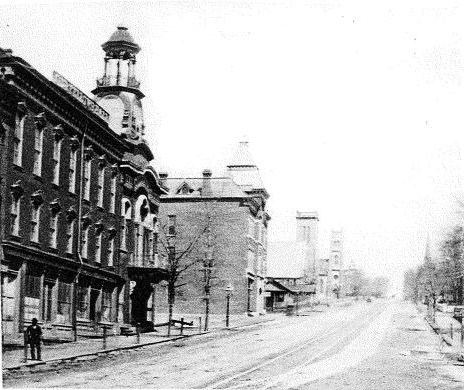
The Wupperman Block/I.O.O.F. Hall is the first building on the left in this 1880 photograph.

The Wupperman Block is a three-story, brick building that was built on a stone foundation. It is an early attempt at Renaissance Revival architecture in Davenport, which up until this time was dominated by the Greek Revival style. The structure is rectangular in shape and has a side-gable roof. The two storefronts on the first floor are largely intact. The main façade of the building is divided into three sections: the storefront, the upper wall and the cornice. Although the building has been renovated it maintains its cast iron shop fronts and flanking brick piers.

The upper floors of the building contain seven windows that are evenly distributed. The windows are all rectangular in shape, but each is topped with a curved cornice. The windows on the third floor are taller than the ones on the second, which gives the building a vertical orientation. At one time the windows on the third floor were stained glass and depicted symbols of the I.O.O.F. These windows have been removed.

When it was built, the building had a projecting cornice that has been replaced by a cornice of corbelled brick. The side-gabled roofline is unusual for a building in Iowa and suggests a European influence in its design. The building remains a good example of pre-Civil War commercial architecture.
