= D.C. Eldridge House =

Historic house in Iowa, United States

- U.S. National Register of Historic Places
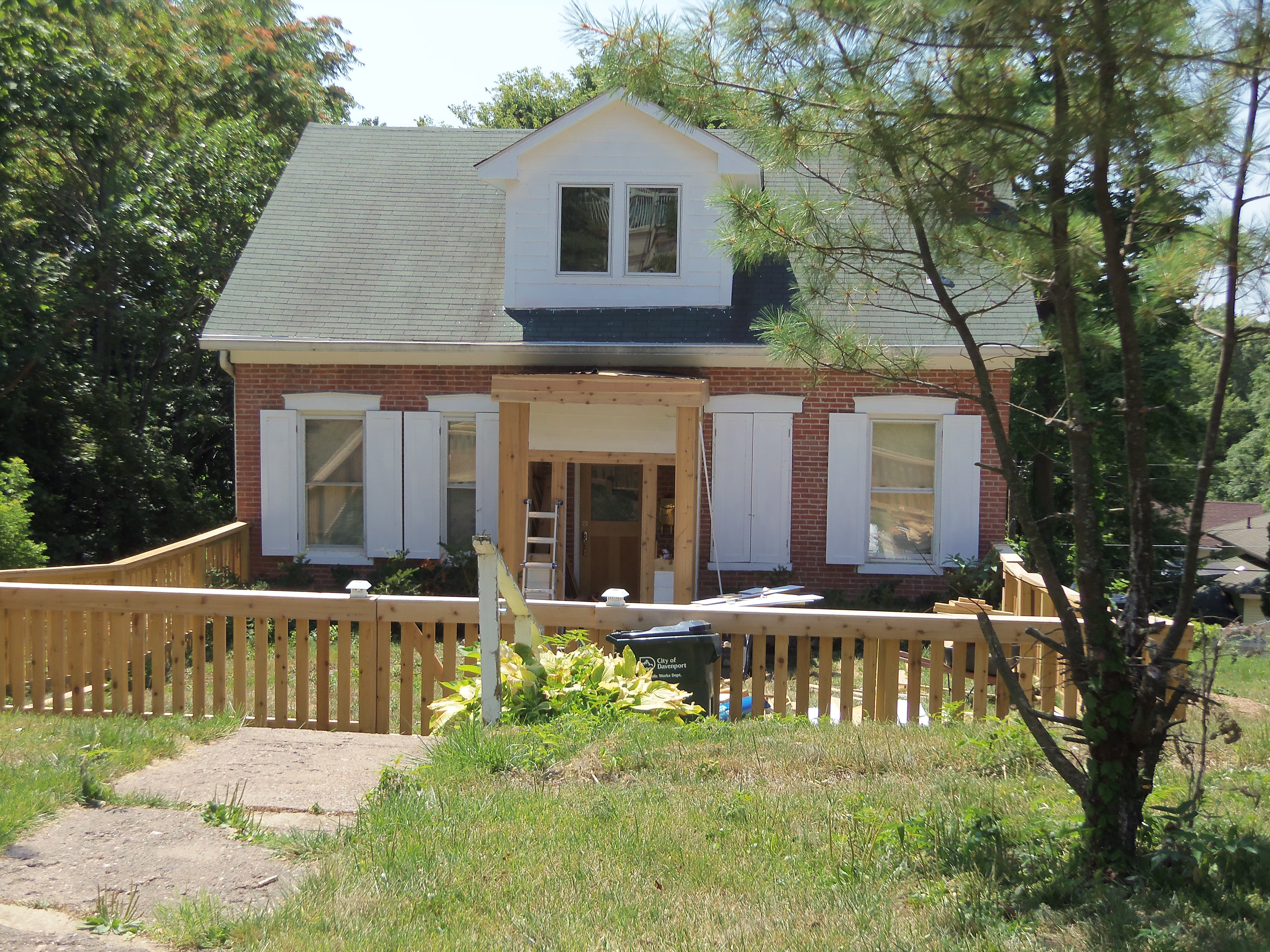
- The north façade in 2012

- Location within Iowa Location within the United States
- Location: 1333 E. 10th St., Davenport, Iowa
- Coordinates: 41°31′47″N 90°33′18″W
- Area: less than one acre
- Built: 1865
- Architectural style: Greek Revival
- MPS: Davenport MRA
- NRHP reference No.: 84001402
- Added to NRHP: July 27, 1984

The D.C. Eldridge House is a historic building located on the east side of Davenport, Iowa, United States. It has been listed on the National Register of Historic Places since 1984.

== Duncan Campbell Eldridge ==
Duncan Campbell Eldridge (also known as D.C. Eldridge) was one of the original settlers in the city of Davenport. In December 1836 he opened a store in a log house on the corner of Front Street (now River Drive) and Ripley Street. He was said to be the first person in the town to keep a general assortment of goods. Antoine LeClaire, who was named the towns first postmaster, named Eldridge his deputy. Eldridge was a Whig politically and served as postmaster during the administrations of Presidents John Tyler and Zachary Taylor.

The legislature of the Territory of Iowa incorporated the town in the winter of 1838–1839. The first election of officers was held on April 1, 1839, and Eldridge was elected one of the trustees. On July 25 of the same year seventeen people met in Eldridge's house to organize the Christian Church, also known as the Disciples of Christ.

== Architecture ==
The Greek Revival style was the first style to have a significant impact in Davenport. The home was believed to have been built by another early Davenport settler Ambrose Fulton in 1865. It is somewhat unusual from other examples of this style in Davenport. It is five bays rather than the typical three and its bank construction. From the north, the structure appears to be a small cottage, but its south façade reveals it to be a full two-story house. The north dormer and the porches on the north and south sides are believed to have been added 10 to 20 years after the house was built. The porch on the north side is a small, single bay structure while the porch on the south side is two stories and covers the full length of the structure.
