= Putnam-Parker Block =

- U.S. National Register of Historic Places
- U.S. Historic district – Contributing property
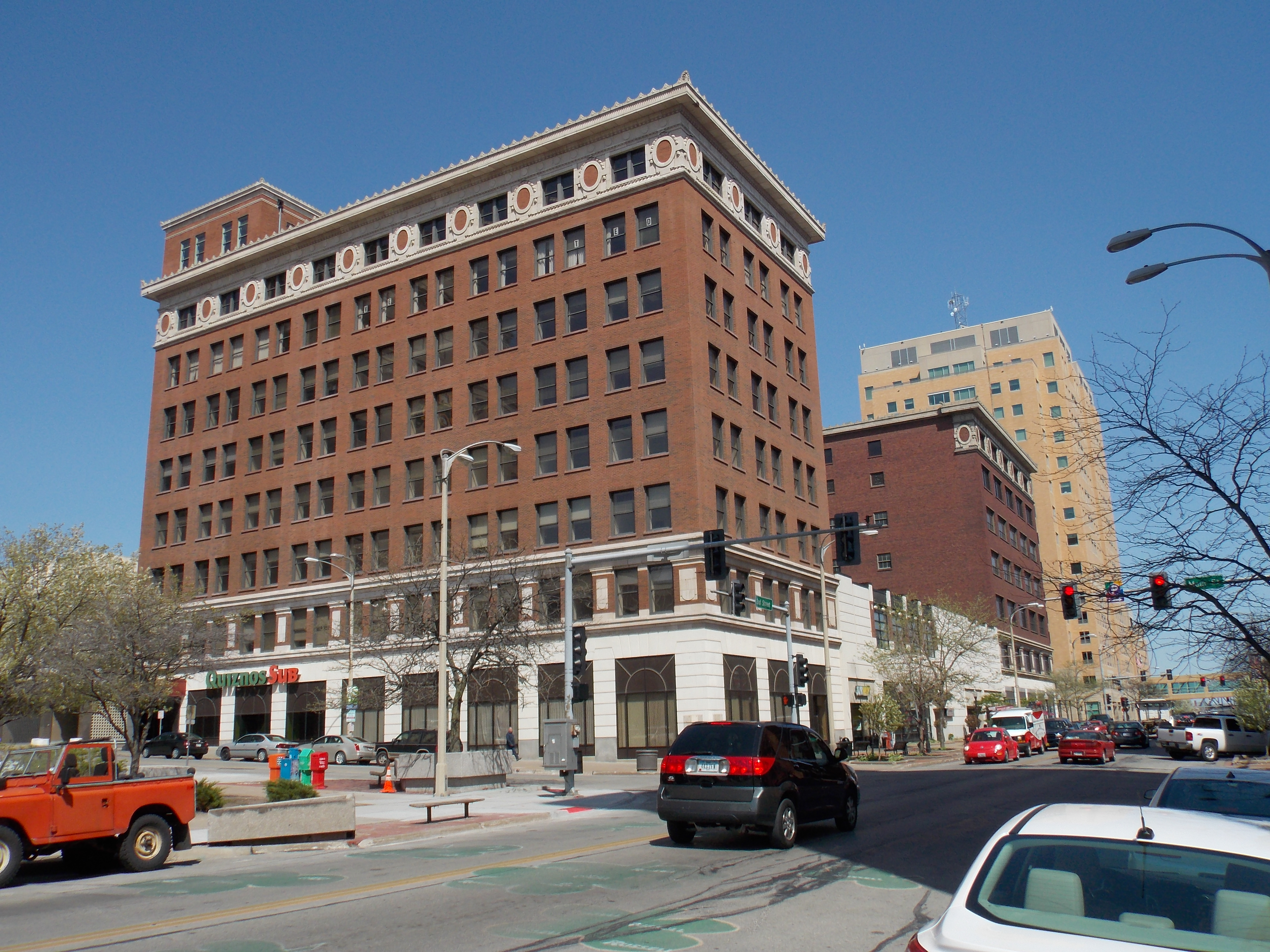

- Location within Iowa Location within the United States
- Location: 100-130 W. 2nd St. Davenport, Iowa
- Coordinates: 41°31′17.8″N 90°34′29.7″W
- Area: approximately 1 acre (0.40 ha)
- Built: Putnam Building 1909-1910; M.L. Parker Building 1922
- Built by: Gustav Wilke (Putnam); George A. Fuller Company (Parker)
- Architect: Peirce Anderson; D.H. Burnham & Co.
- Architectural style: Chicago School
- Part of: Davenport Downtown Commercial Historic District (ID100005546)
- NRHP reference No.: 11000662
- Added to NRHP: September 15, 2011

The Putnam-Parker Block, also known as City Square, are historic structures located in downtown Davenport, Iowa, United States. The property includes three buildings that take up the south half of block 43 in what is known as LeClaire's First Addition. The main façade of the structures face south along West Second Street. They were listed on the National Register of Historic Places in 2011. In 2020, it was included as a contributing property in the Davenport Downtown Commercial Historic District. The former Putnam Building now houses a Marriott Autograph Collection hotel named The Current Iowa.

== History ==
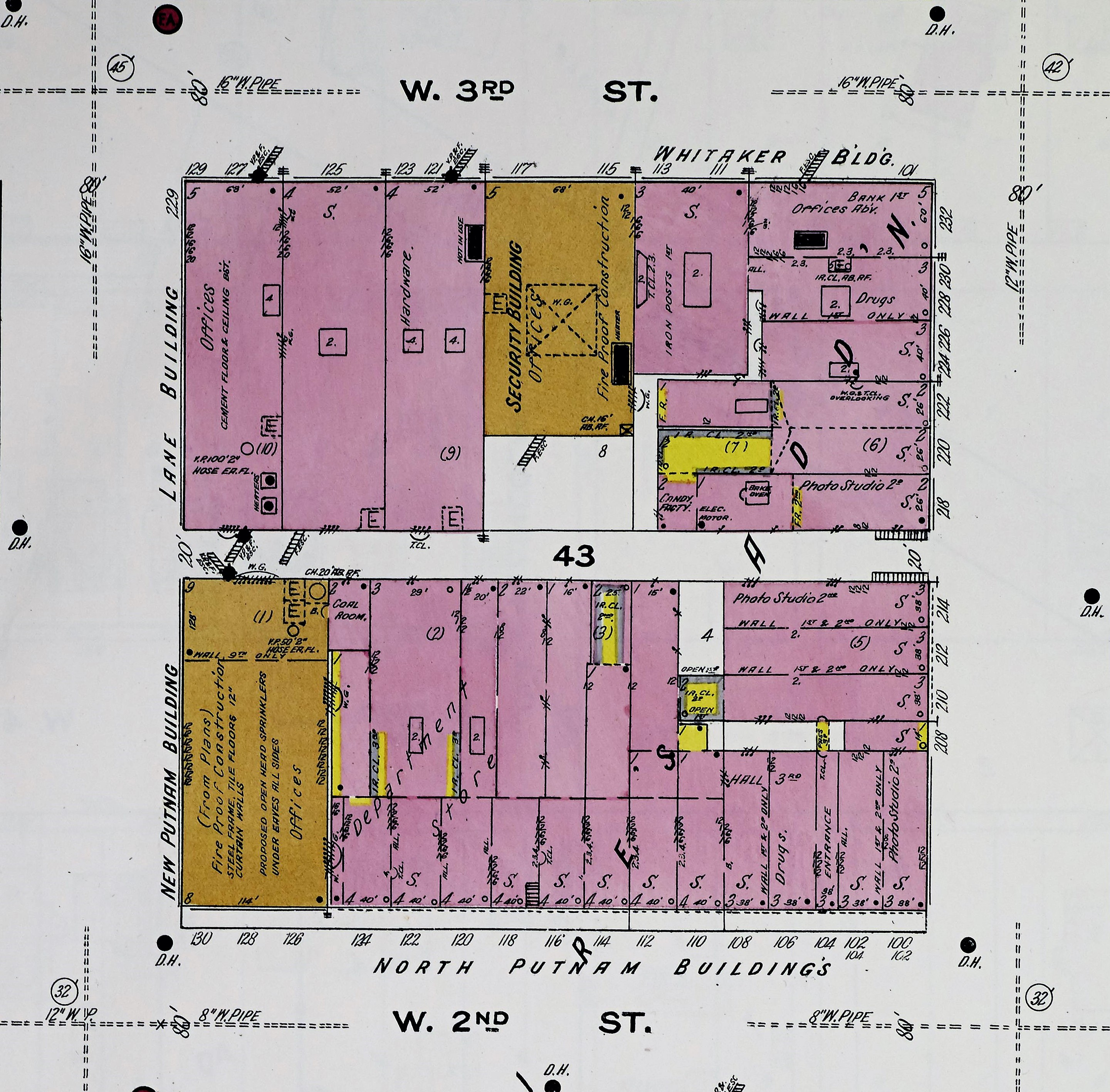
A 1910 Sanborn Fire Insurance Map shows the location of the Putnam Building (gold) on the lower left. The rest of the half-block, listed as the North Putnum Buildings, was built by Antoine Le Claire.

Antoine LeClaire, who was primarily responsible for establishing the city of Davenport, built a hotel named the LeClaire House on the northeast corner of Main and West Second Streets in 1839. It contained retail space on the ground level. At the other end of the block on the northwest corner of Brady and West Second Streets, he built a three-story brick building in 1850. It also provided retail space on the main level and LeClaire Hall on the upper floors. It was later renamed LeClaire Row. Charles Viele of Evansville, Indiana bought the half-block sometime before 1886. The LeClaire House was renamed the Newcomb House after Viele's sister, Mrs. V. Newcomb, and the LeClaire Row was renamed the Viele Building. The Fair, a department store that would eventually become the M.L. Parker Department Store occupied the retail space of the Newcomb house at this time.

William C. Putnam bought Viele's interest in the block in 1895. Putnam was a Davenport attorney and businessman who managed the block for both LeClaire and Viele. He renovated the buildings and lowered the stores to street level. Putnam and his mother, Mary Louisa Duncan Putnam, established the Putnam Trust. The trust owned the entire half-block of West Second Street. It benefited the Putnam Memorial Fund, which was the non-profit charitable support organization for the Davenport Academy of Sciences, now known as the Putnam Museum. The Putnam-Parker Block was a source of revenue for the trust. It is the only real estate development in the city known to serve this type of purpose. The trust paid for the construction of the present museum building and the neighboring building, which housed the former Davenport Museum of Art until it moved downtown as the Figge Art Museum.

In 2007, the W.C. Putnam Estate sold controlling interest in the Putnam-Parker Block to a group of investors called One Putnam Centre LLC and maintained a minority interest of 30%. The three buildings were sold to Amrit and Amy Gill in 2013, and they developed them into City Square. The Putnam Trust was dissolved in 2015 when the estate sold its last property, a parking lot on Main Street.

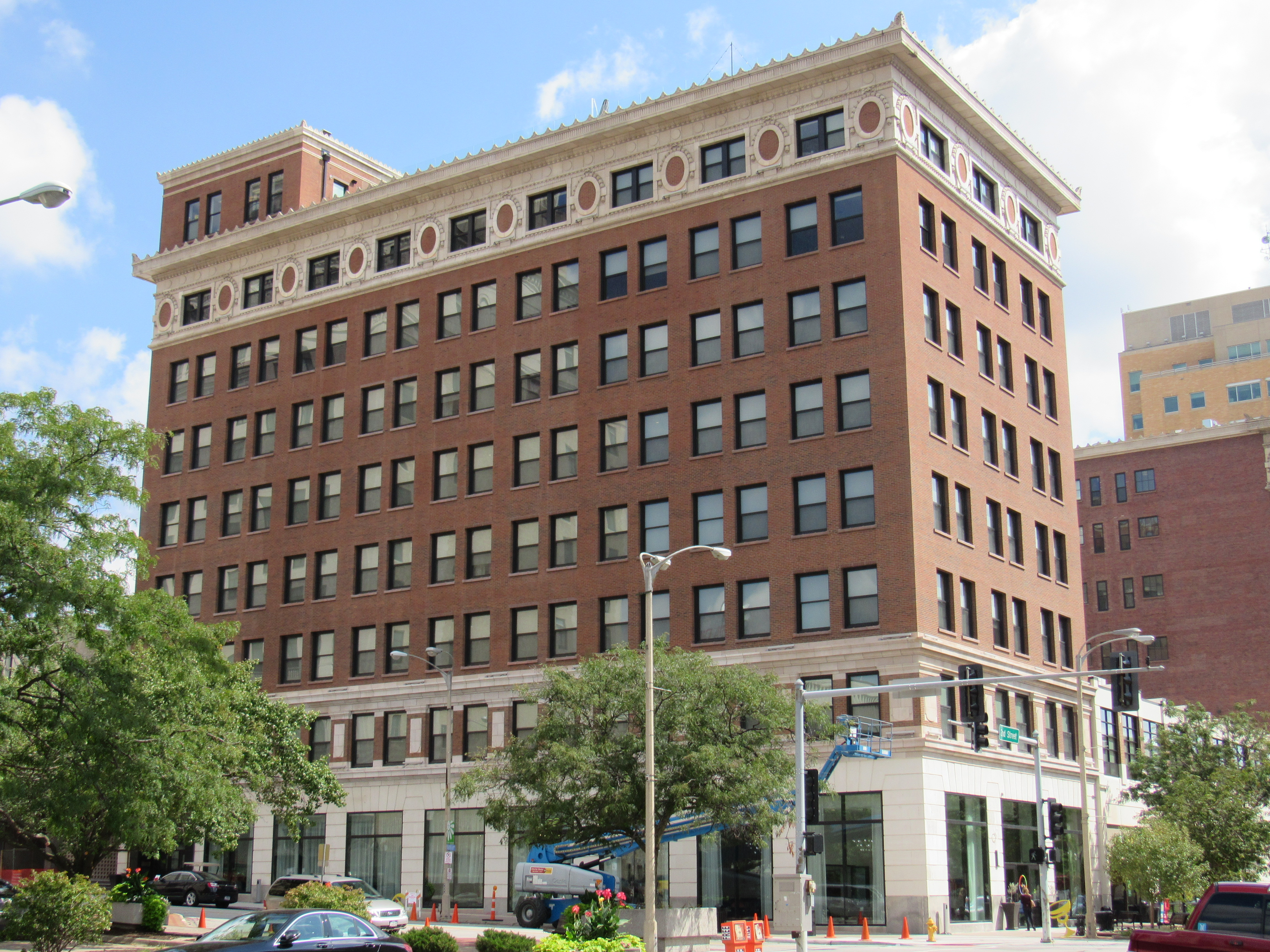
The Putnam Building in 2017.

=== Putnam Building ===
W.C. Putnam planned to replace the old hotel with a modern office building, but he died in 1906. The plans were eventually carried out by his brother, Edward K. Putnam. The Putnam Building was completed in 1910 by prominent Chicago contactor Gustav Wilke. The other structures on the block were renamed the North Putnam Buildings. This "was the first steel frame structure in Davenport that utilized the “tall” building design for an office building, relying on the steel frame structure to achieve its height, open floor plan, and large windows." A variety of retail and professional offices have been housed in the building over the years. Among them was the historical library of the Davenport Public Museum, now the Putnam Museum. H.E. Schraff Store occupied first-floor retail space from around 1928–1956, and men's clothing store Simon & Landauer from 1933 to 1964. The building contained 105 office spaces that housed some of the city's prominent attorneys, doctors, dentists, and businessmen. Entry into the offices was in the back of the building, off of Main Street. Two elevators served the upper floors. A major renovation of the building was completed in 1991 that upgraded the structure for modern office use. The local chamber of commerce moved their headquarters here about that time. In July 2017, another major renovation of the building was completed that created a boutique hotel named The Current Iowa.

=== M.L. Parker Building ===
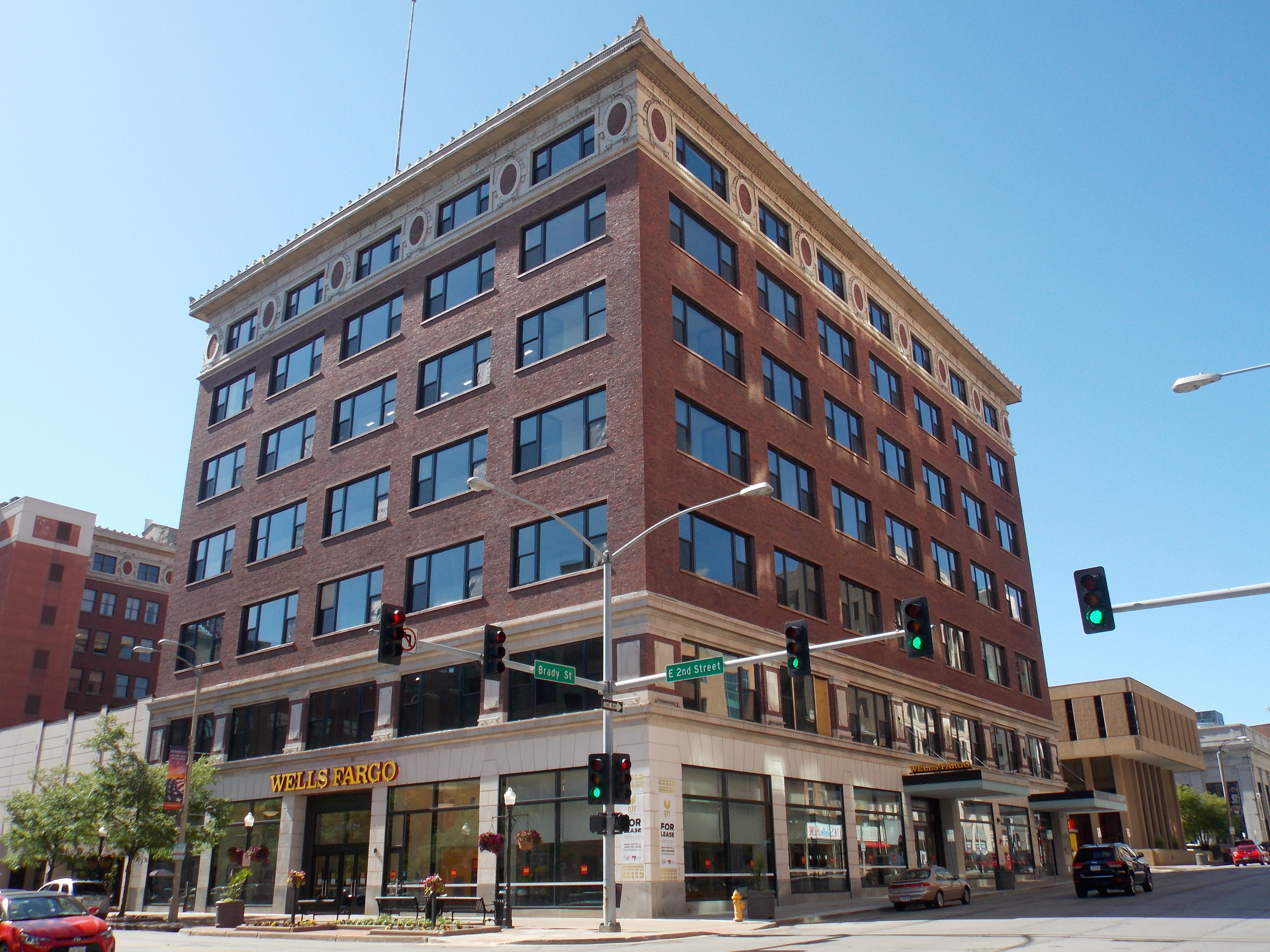
M.L. Parker Building in 2016

The M.L. Parker building was constructed by the prominent Chicago contracting firm George A. Fuller Company on the northwest corner of Brady and West Second Street in 1922. It was the only tall building in Davenport that housed a department store. The Fair Store opened before World War I and changed its name to the M.L. Parker Department Store in 1922. The W.C. Putnam Estate had reached a lease agreement with the store in 1916, but high building costs because of World War I delayed construction. Parker's occupied the entire building from February 14, 1923, until 1972. It was a major non-franchise company that operated a classic department store offering clothing, furniture, rugs, housewares and a toyland in the basement at Christmas. It was the city's largest department store during its existence, and claimed to be Iowa's largest department store at the time of this building's construction. In 1970, another Davenport department store, Peteresen Harned Von Maur, bought Parker's. They operated a budget outlet for their store here until 1974 after they closed Parker's. The upper floors of the building were converted into office space after that. Among the tenants in the office space were the accounting firm of McGladrey & Pullen, later RSM McGladrey, and Verizon operated a call center. The main floor retail space remained empty.

=== Putnam Center Building ===
Between the Putnam and Parker buildings is a two-story infill section. It was originally designed to complement the two towers. However, that structure was never built as funds were not available for its construction until the mid-20th century. Until then, the building that originally stood between the Putnam and Parker buildings was a four-story gabled structure built by LeClaire in the 1850s. The second floor was converted into a "shops building" that contained 16 to 20 shops lining an interior corridor. The old building suffered damage because of a fire on September 3, 1926. As a result, most of the upper stories on the back of the building were removed and the shops building concept was discontinued. Plans for the current structure were drawn up in 1955 and construction was completed in 1957. The original folded yellow brick facade was remodeled in the 1990s. Rather than having a unified appearance as originally envisioned, the Putnam-Parker Block appears to be the three separate structures that it has always been. Most of the Putnam Center Building housed the downtown J.C. Penney store until it moved to the newly constructed NorthPark Mall on the city's north side in 1973. The building continues to house retail establishments in its four storefronts. More windows were added to its second story when the building was renovated in 2017. Unlike the Putnam and Parker Buildings, the Putnam Center Building is not a contributing property in the historic designation.

=== City Square ===
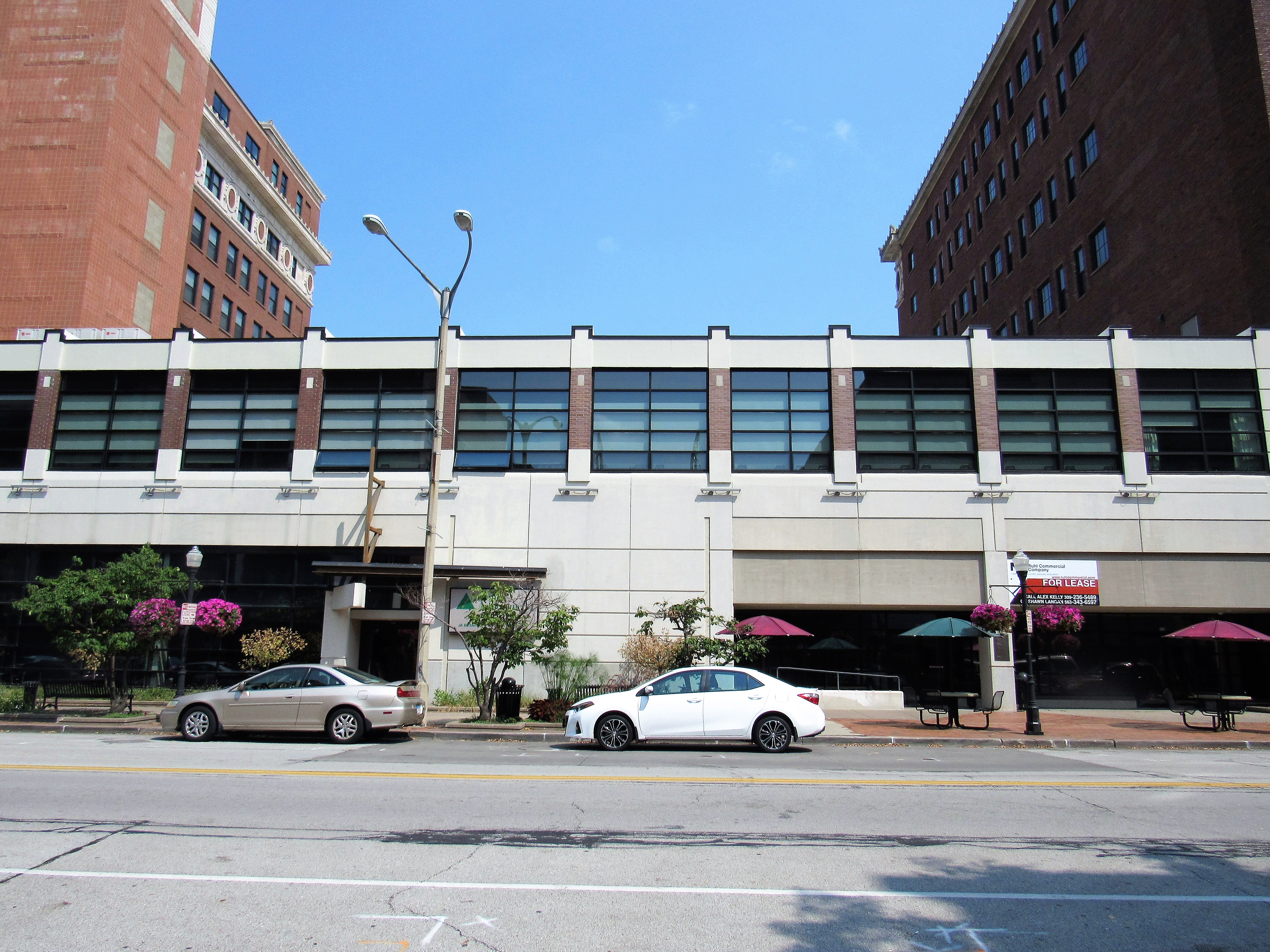
Putnam Center Building in 2018

In 2012, the city of Davenport was discerning what to do about the riverboat casino anchored in the Mississippi River. Three companies proposed development ideas concerning a new land-based casino. Amrit and Amy Gill of Restoration St. Louis, who renovated the Hotel Blackhawk in 2010, planned a $155 million (~$217 million in 2024) project to transform the Putnam and Parker buildings and adjoining properties. The city chose one of the other projects, and the Gills announced a new development in November 2013. Called City Square, the $60 million project would transform the Putnam-Parker block into a suite hotel and market-rate housing in the Putnam Building and Class A office space in the Parker Building.

The Parker Building now houses four floors of office space. Wells Fargo Bank was signed as the anchor tenant on the main floor. The top two floors house 20 luxury apartments. There is a connection to the Center Building on the second floor. The Putnam Building houses the hotel and apartments. The lobby, restaurant, and bar are located on the main floor. Most of the 78 suites are located on the second through the sixth floors, and the top two floors house 14 luxury apartments. A restaurant and a bar are located on the roof of the building. The hotel is also decorated with over 500 pieces of original artwork created by Midwest artists. The Putnam Center Building houses 12 extended stay rooms and houses amenities such as the swimming pool, fitness center, and executive conference space for the hotel. It also continues to house retail on the main floor. There is a connection with the Eastern Iowa Community College District's downtown campus on the north half of the block.

== Architecture ==
The Putnam and Parker buildings were originally designed by the Chicago architectural firm of D. H. Burnham & Company. The Putnam Building was the last building completed during Daniel Burnham's lifetime, and The Current Iowa is the only hotel in a building that was designed by his firm. The Parker Building is a modified design by Graham, Anderson, Probst & White, a successor to D. H. Burnham & Company with extensive experience designing department stores. Peirce Anderson, who worked for both of the firms, was the architect primarily responsible for the design of both the Putnum and Parker buildings. He served as chief designer for D.H. Burnham & Company when he designed the Putnam Building, and he was a partner and head of the design department for Graham, Anderson, Probst, and White when he designed the M.L. Parker Building. Taussig & Flesch, a Chicago firm that specialized in interior department store designs, was consulted on the Parker Building.

Anderson designed the whole half block to have the same appearance and the Putman and Parker buildings are nearly identical. They show clear references to the Chicago School. The Putnam Building is an eight-story structure that is 120 feet (37 m) tall. The Parker Building is seven stories tall and rises 100.29 feet (31 m) above the ground. Both structures are built on a brick foundation and feature a steel skeleton covered in red brick. Decorative materials include stone facing and decorative panels of terra cotta. The two towers each show a clearly defined tripartite façade. Neoclassical elements are found in the decorative cornice at the top. However, the simplified design and use of terra cotta show the Chicago School's influence.

The two-story Putnam Center Building was also designed by Graham, Anderson, Probst & White. By the 1950s when the building was designed, the firm had shifted its emphasis to designing Modernist structures.
