= Anthony Burdick House =

Historic house in Iowa, United States

- U.S. National Register of Historic Places
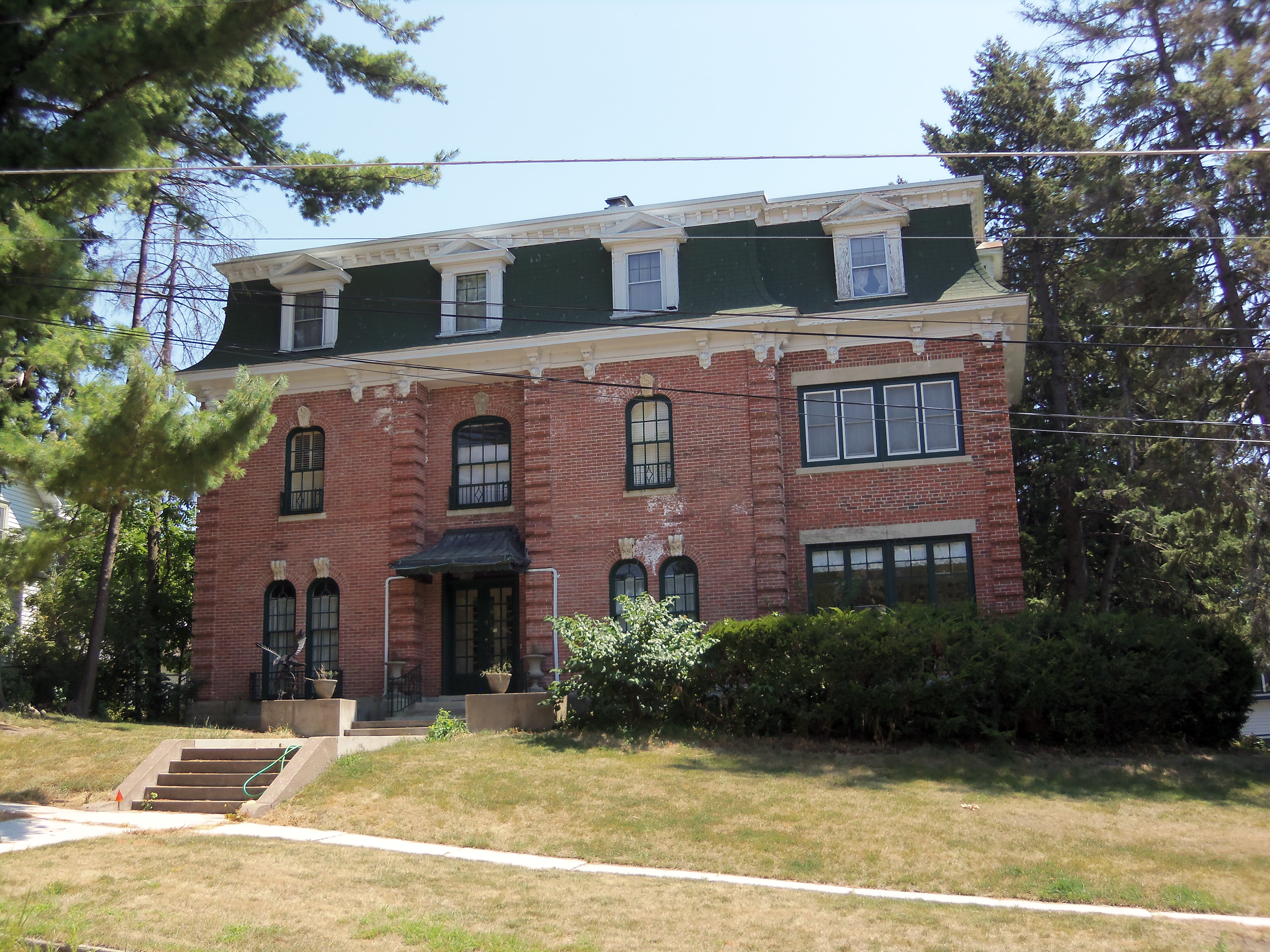

- Location within Iowa Location within the United States
- Location: 833 College Ave. Davenport, Iowa
- Coordinates: 41°31′42″N 90°33′21″W
- Area: less than one acre
- Built: 1880
- Architect: Willet Carroll
- Architectural style: Italianate
- MPS: Davenport MRA
- NRHP reference No.: 84003854
- Added to NRHP: July 27, 1984

The Anthony Burdick House is a historic building located on the eastside of Davenport, Iowa, United States. It has been listed on the National Register of Historic Places since 1984.

== History ==
City directories attribute this house to Anthony Burdick who had it built in 1880. Burdick settled in Davenport in 1869 and was engaged in several commercial and financial ventures. Notable among these activities was president of First National Bank for 25 years and his ownership of a wholesale jobbing firm, Smith Brothers & Burdick. He was also the president of a local financial firm called the Davenport Clearinghouse Association.

The attribution of this house to Burdick is not absolute. Oszuscik in 1979 referred to it as the Shields House and dates it to 1870. Given that there are similarities between this house and the F.H. Miller House (1871) on Brady Street puts that within the realm of possibility. Willet Carroll, however, designed both of these houses so their similarities may be attributed to only that. Carroll was one of the first professional architects working in Davenport.

== Architecture ==
The Anthony Burdick House combines the rectilinearity of the Italianate style and the mansard roof of the Second Empire style. A noteworthy feature is the entrance bay, which is recessed rather than flush or projecting from the main façade. It also features numerous window sizes and shapes. The two-story house follows a rectangular plan and there is a gabled-roofed wing off of the back. There is a modillion cornice at the roof deck and a bracketed and molded frieze. Keystones decorate the tops of the windows and there is brick quoining on the corners. There have been several alterations made to this house. The central tower has been removed and an addition was added to the south side of the structure. The original dormers have been replaced as have the polychrome shingles. The house sits on a raised lot that slopes toward the south.
