= Antoine LeClaire House =

Historic house in Iowa, United States

- U.S. National Register of Historic Places
- Davenport Register of Historic Properties
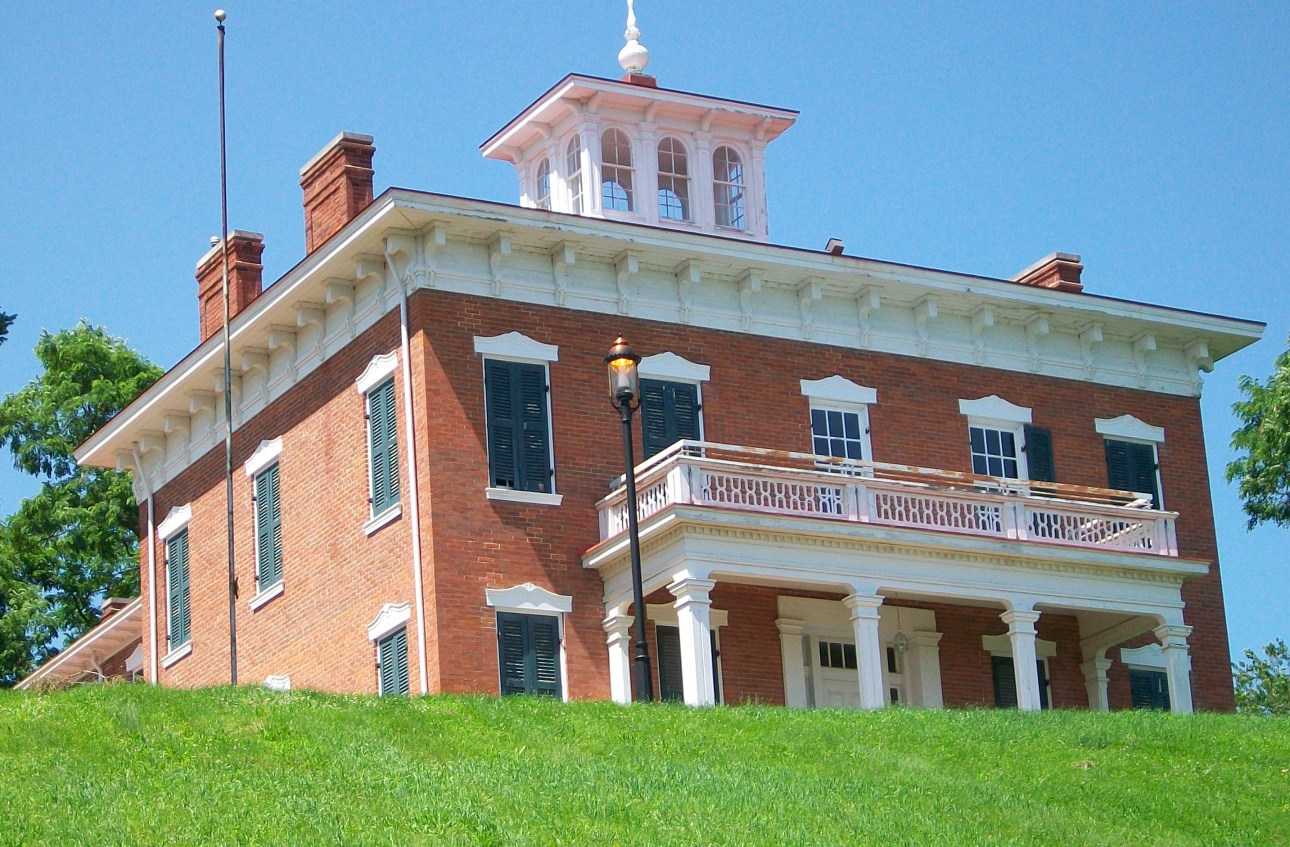

- Location within Iowa Location within the United States
- Location: 630 E. 7th St. Davenport, Iowa
- Coordinates: 41°31′37″N 90°33′54″W
- Area: 1 acre (0.40 ha)
- Built: 1855
- Architectural style: Italianate
- NRHP reference No.: 74000809
- DRHP No.: 1

Significant dates
- Added to NRHP: March 22, 1974
- Designated DRHP: September 16, 1992

The Antoine LeClaire House is a historic building located on the east side of Davenport, Iowa, United States. It is a community center that was built as a private home by one of the founders of the city of Davenport. It also housed two of Davenport's Catholic bishops. The home was constructed in 1855. It was listed on the National Register of Historic Places in 1974, and on the Davenport Register of Historic Properties in 1992.

== History ==
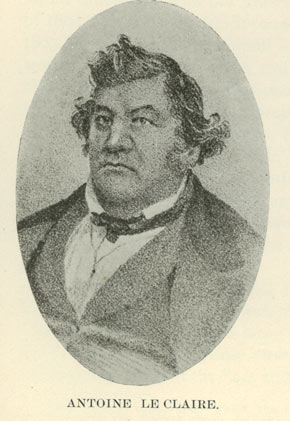
Antoine LeClaire

=== Antoine Le Claire ===
Antoine Le Claire was an interpreter for the U.S. Government stationed at Fort Armstrong on Rock Island on the Mississippi River. In 1832 he was the interpreter for the treaty signing between the Sac (Sauk) and Meskwaki tribes and the United States after the Black Hawk War. The tribes gave Le Claire two parcels of land in Iowa, one at the top of the Rock Island Rapids and one below. The lower parcel became part of the city of Davenport, which he was instrumental in establishing in 1836.

Le Claire became Davenport's first citizen. He established the first church (St. Anthony's), ferry service, steam mill, store, hotel, and foundry. His philanthropy included the establishment of two other churches, the property for the Scott County Courthouse, and Iowa College, which later became Grinnell College. There is also some indication that Le Claire was involved in the Underground Railroad.

Le Claire agreed to build his first house on the location where the Black Hawk Treaty was signed. He built a small log structure on the site in 1833 after the treaty was ratified by the United States Senate. It was replaced by a small white house that became known as the Treaty House. Le Claire and his wife Marguerite lived in the modest house until 1855 when they built an Italianate mansion in the center of the Le Claire Reserve. The Reserve is one of the parcels deeded to Le Claire by the tribes and covers much of the east side of Davenport south of Locust Street. The house, and others being built by Davenport's wealthier citizens, shows the progress the city had made in the twenty years since its founding.

Le Claire donated the Treaty House to the Mississippi and Missouri Railroad. It was not only Davenport's first railroad station, but the first station west of the Mississippi. The house had to be moved from its original location. With his support, the first railroad bridge had been built across the Mississippi and its location was just below his Italianate mansion. It was completed a year after the house. The first locomotive to cross the river was named the Antoine LeClaire. The steamboat Effie Afton struck the bridge and the following lawsuit became one of Abraham Lincoln's best-known cases.

Le Claire and his wife lived in the mansion until they died in 1861 and 1876 respectively. The couple had no children, but they informally adopted his nephew, Louis Antoine Le Claire, after Antoine Le Claire's half-brother Alexis died in 1849. He inherited the couple's property upon their death.

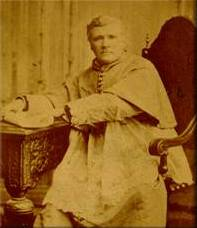
Bishop John McMullen

=== Diocese of Davenport ===
The title to the St. Anthony's church property, named Church Square, was deeded by LeClaire to Bishop Mathias Loras of the Diocese of Dubuque in 1839 to support the Catholic Church in Davenport. Commercial properties were built on the east side of the block. Income from these properties was a factor in Davenport being named a see city with its own bishop in 1881. The Very Reverend John McMullen from Chicago was named the first bishop of the Diocese of Davenport. The clergy of the diocese purchased the LeClaire House for the bishop's residence. McMullen died in the house less than two years later. His successor, Henry Cosgrove, moved into the residence after he was named Bishop of Davenport in 1884. When Cosgrove died in 1906 his successor, James Davis, chose to live elsewhere because the house needed extensive repairs and it needed to be renovated. Previously there had been a friendly rivalry between Cosgrove and Davis after the later had a new rectory built at Sacred Heart Cathedral, where he was the rector, because it was larger and more modern. The diocese sold the LeClaire House and purchased the F.H. Miller House as the new residence for the bishop.

=== Later years ===
After the Catholic diocese sold the house in 1908 it was converted into apartments. At some point the original three porches were removed and the brick was painted white. By the start of World War I, the neighborhood was in decline and the LeClaire House began to deteriorate along with it. It was purchased and saved from ruin by Glen Daut, who filled its nomination to the National Register and lobbied for renovation.

In 1976 the Bicentennial Commission of the city of Davenport purchased the house from Daut as one of their projects. An extensive renovation process has been ongoing since then. Extensive work has been done to the exterior and interior with all the mechanical systems having been replaced.

== Architecture ==
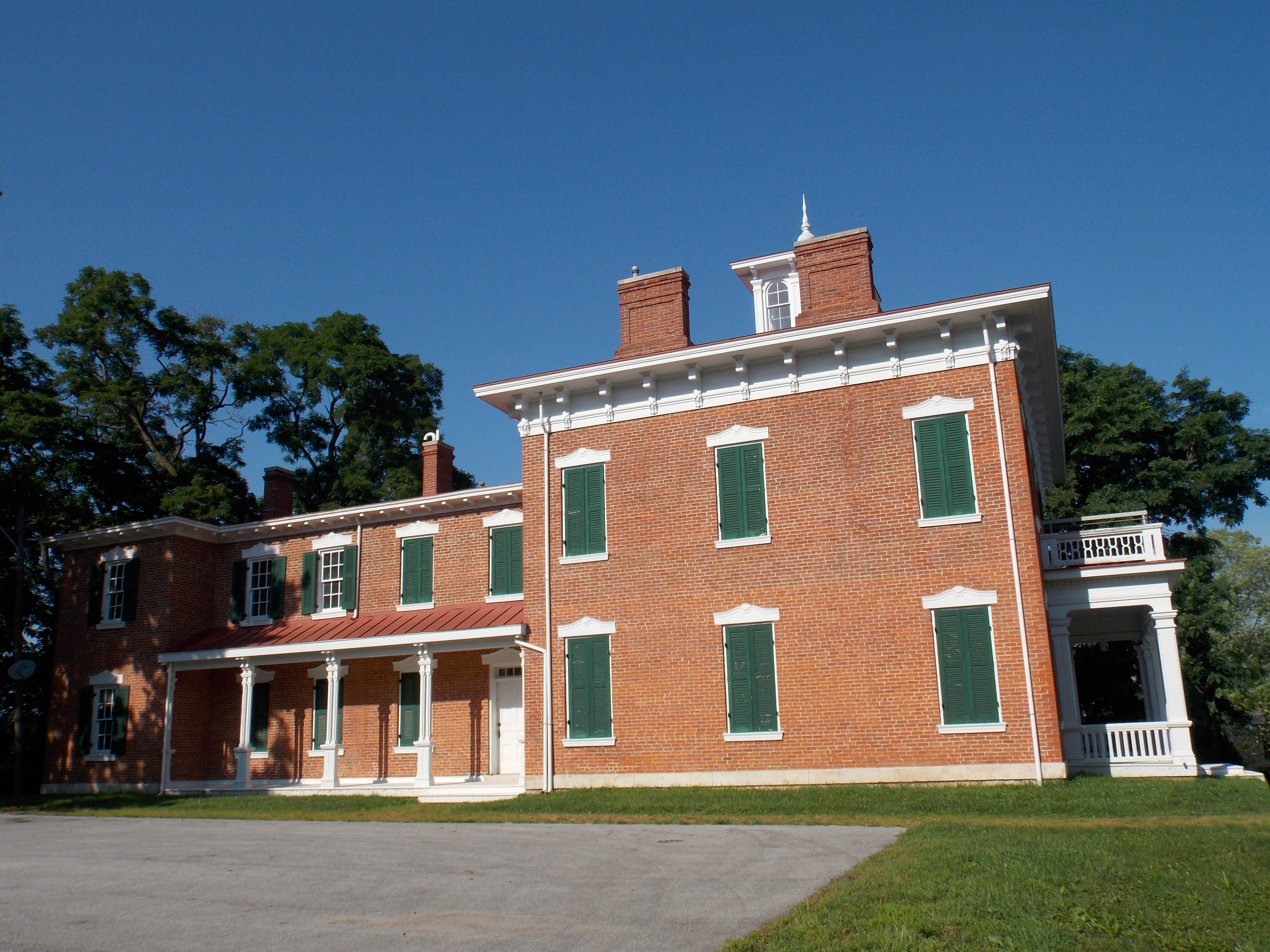
View of the west elevation showing the back wing of the house

The LeClaire House is a two-story, brick, 14-room Tuscan Italianate mansion on the top of a bluff 125 feet (38 m) above the Mississippi River. The rooms are evenly divided on the two floors. The front square section of the house has four rooms on each floor and there are three rooms in a back wing. A large corridor stretches from the front to the back of the house on both floors. The exterior features a shallow hipped roof, wide, bracketed eaves, and a belvedere on the top of the roof. The house has nine fireplaces, 12-foot (3.7 m) high ceilings, ornate plaster medallions, and a 3-story elliptical staircase. There are also Greek Revival elements to the house as well. They are found in the doorway framed between pilasters and the scroll pediments over the windows. The property originally had a circular drive made of cinders that was lighted with gas lamps. The estate also contained carriage barns, a summer kitchen, an ice house, and a plum grove.

== Renovation Goals ==
Five goals were established as guiding principles for the LeClaire House renovation:

1. The area will have a resource by which future generations of residents can develop a better understanding and appreciation of Davenport's important role in the settlement of not only eastern Iowa, but also the entire state.

2. The rehabilitation of LeClaire House, especially due to its visually prominent bluff-top location, will stimulate the interest of both residents and tourists alike in local history. This will in turn foster a greater appreciation and support for the area's cultural assets.

3. Completion of the LeClaire House will encourage additional investment in the neighborhood that could eventually have a beneficial impact on the neighborhood's housing stock and the local economy.

4. The quality of life for the neighborhood in particular and community pride in the area as a whole will be enhanced when the highly visible homestead of the city's co-founder is fully restored and in use.

5. The City will have a self-supporting community/local history interpretive center in the central city providing a unique service to non-profit groups, neighborhood associations, and the general public.

== Significance ==
The LeClaire House is historically significant both in its architecture and the importance of Antoine Le Claire to the local community. It was one of the first Italianate residences in Davenport and it was influential in the design of other large-scale homes in the city. Le Claire was the founder of the city, one of its most prominent philanthropists and entrepreneurs in its early years. He is also significant in the establishment of the Catholic Church in Davenport. While his death predates the establishment of the diocese, he donated the property for both St. Anthony's and St. Margaret's churches. The later church was largely built by LeClaire, and became the city's first Catholic Cathedral.
