= Davenport Downtown Commercial Historic District =

Historic district in Iowa, United States

- U.S. National Register of Historic Places
- U.S. Historic district
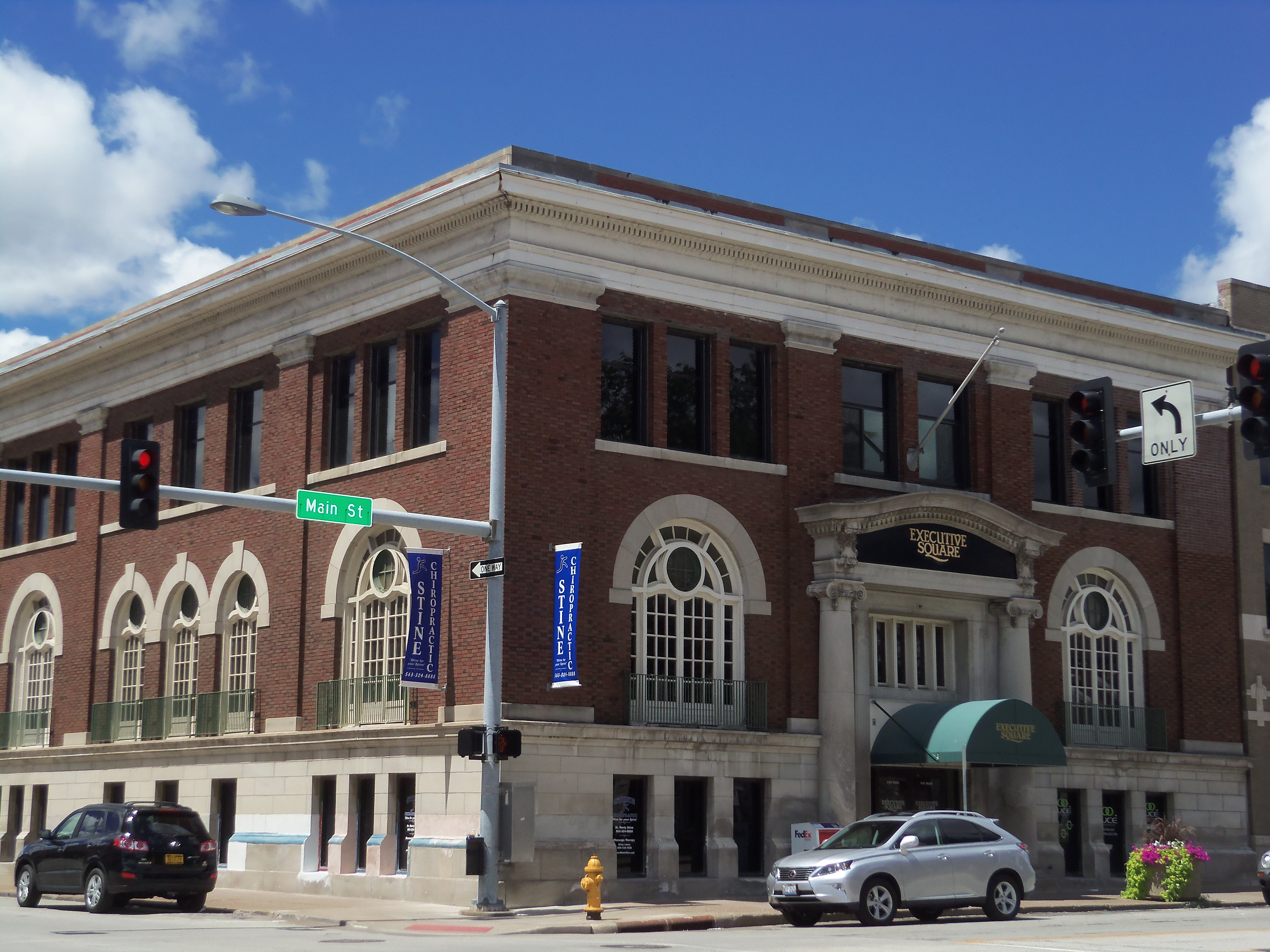
- Davenport Commercial Club (1905)

- Location within Iowa Location within the United States
- Interactive map showing the location of Davenport Downtown Historic District
- Location: 2nd St. to 5th St., Perry St. to Western Ave., Davenport, Iowa
- Coordinates: 41°31′22.6″N 90°34′13.5″W
- Area: 49 acres (20 ha)
- Architect: J.W. Ross; Clausen & Kruse; Edward Durell Stone et al
- Architectural style: Greek Revival; Victorian; Late 19th and 20th Century Revivals; Late 19th and 20th Century American Movements; Modern Movement
- NRHP reference No.: 100005546
- Added to NRHP: September 11, 2020

The Davenport Downtown Commercial Historic District is a nationally recognized historic district located in the central business district of Davenport, Iowa, United States. It was listed on the National Register of Historic Places in 2020. At the time of its nomination it consisted of 43 resources, which included 33 contributing buildings, one contributing structure, and nine non-contributing buildings. In addition, the district also contains 33 buildings that are individually listed on the National Register. This historic district is bordered by four other districts: the Crescent Warehouse Historic District and the Davenport Motor Row and Industrial Historic District on the east, the Hamburg Historic District to the northwest, and the West Third Street Historic District on the west.

== History ==
Davenport was founded in 1836 on land along the Mississippi River that was part of the Black Hawk Purchase, a 40-to-50-mile (64 to 80 km) tract of land in what is now eastern Iowa. It was platted by land company stockholders that included George Davenport, a merchant and trader at Fort Armstrong and the city's namesake, and Antoine LeClaire, a French-Indian interpreter, lawyer, and speculator. Part of the original town plat is within the historic district. Because there was a question concerning the title to the land, lots were slow to sell so LeClaire platted additions on land to the east of the original plat, also in the district. He received the land as the interpreter for the 1832 treaty that ended the Black Hawk War. He set aside one of the squares for St. Anthony's Catholic Church, the town's first church, which has been located there ever since.

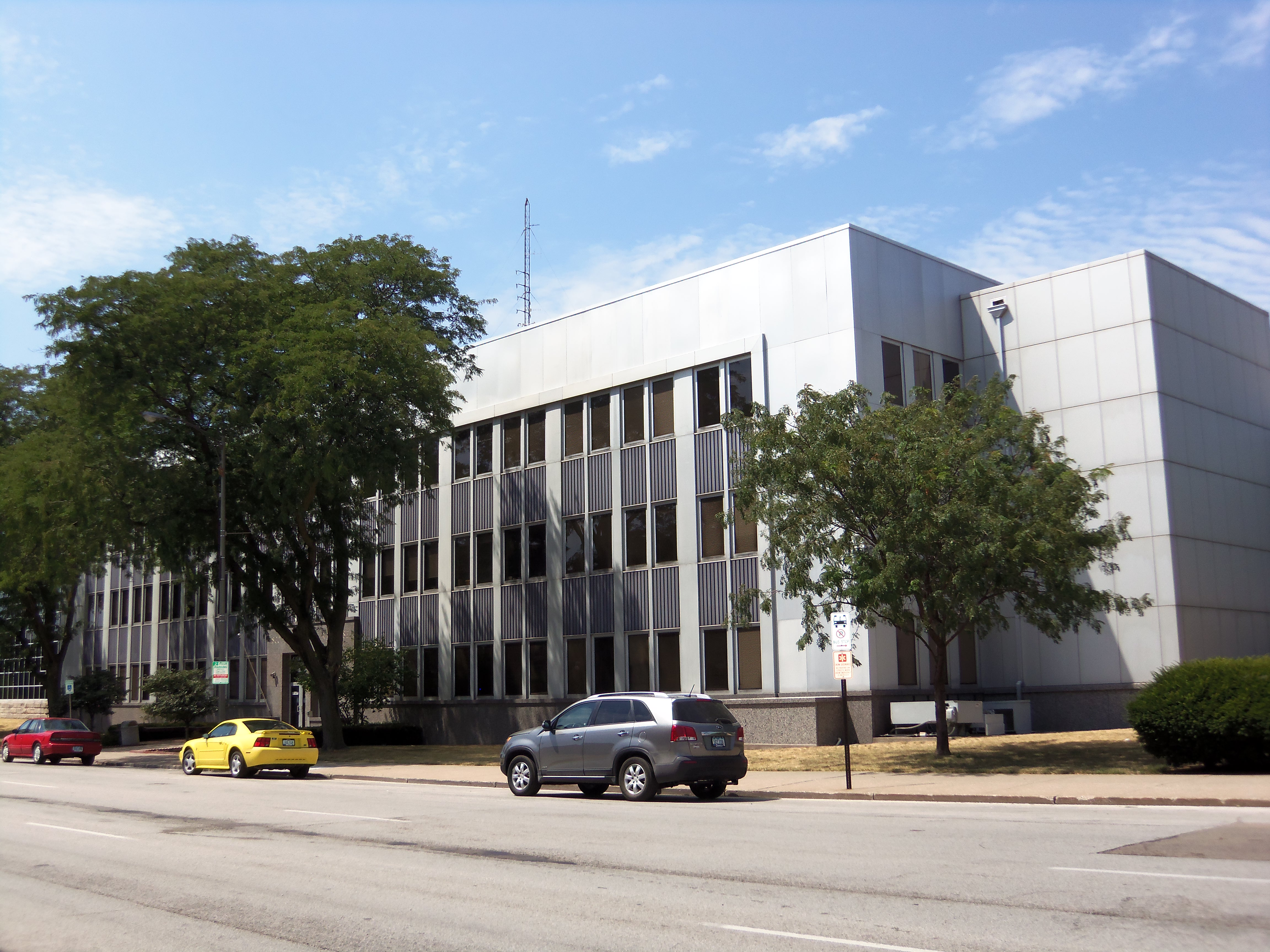
Scott County Courthouse (1956)

Scott County was established by the legislature of the Wisconsin Territory in 1837, and the city fought a protracted battle for the county seat from 1838 to 1840. As part of the deal to gain that distinction, Davenport and LeClaire donated a park square for the courthouse, and the county's three courthouses and its jail have all been built there. The first court sessions were held in St. Anthony's Church until the first courthouse was completed.

Davenport was the first city in Iowa to receive rail service. The Chicago, Rock Island and Pacific Railroad (CRI&P) entered the city in 1856 after the first railroad bridge across the Mississippi River was completed in 1856. The CRI&Ps mainline followed the base of the river bluff on the north side of the downtown area. From 1901 to 1903 the tracks were elevated along Fifth Street. They are the contributing structure in the historic district. The CRI&P passenger station was also located in the district, but service ended there in 1968 and the depot was torn down in the 1970s. The city was also served by three other rail lines, five streetcar lines, and an interurban line called the Clinton, Davenport & Muscatine Railway (Originally the Davenport & Muscatine Railway (Incorporated 1910) and the Iowa & Illinois Railway (Incorporated 1901) until their 1916 merger after being purchased by the United Light & Railways Co.). The latter's station is still extant on Brady Street.

The period of significance for the historic district is from 1850, when the present St. Anthony's Church was begun, until 1968 when the present Davenport Public Library was completed. During the intervening years buildings were constructed for civic, commercial, light industrial, entertainment, multiple dwelling, and fraternal uses. By the 1890s the city had become the financial center of the region and the state. The district was the location for the city's financial institutions, including the city's tallest building, Davenport Bank and Trust (1927). Several hotels, including the Davenport Hotel (1907), were built in the district to serve the main train stations and Hotel Blackhawk (1914, 1920) was a convention-oriented hotel. In addition to the county courthouse, the district also includes Davenport City Hall (1895), Central Fire Station (1901), and the United States Courthouse (1933). Light industrial uses included cigar manufacturing, wood planning, and carriage and plow manufacturing before those buildings were converted into other uses. Initially, commerce focused on dry goods, groceries, specialty stores, and wholesale goods before fashionable department stores were built, including the J.H.C. Petersen's Sons' Store (1892) and M.L. Parker (1922). Multiple theaters were located in the district, but only two remain the Capital Theatre (1922) and the former RKO Orpheum (1931). Of the apartment buildings constructed downtown, the Dorothea (1910) was one of the few buildings constructed by a woman.

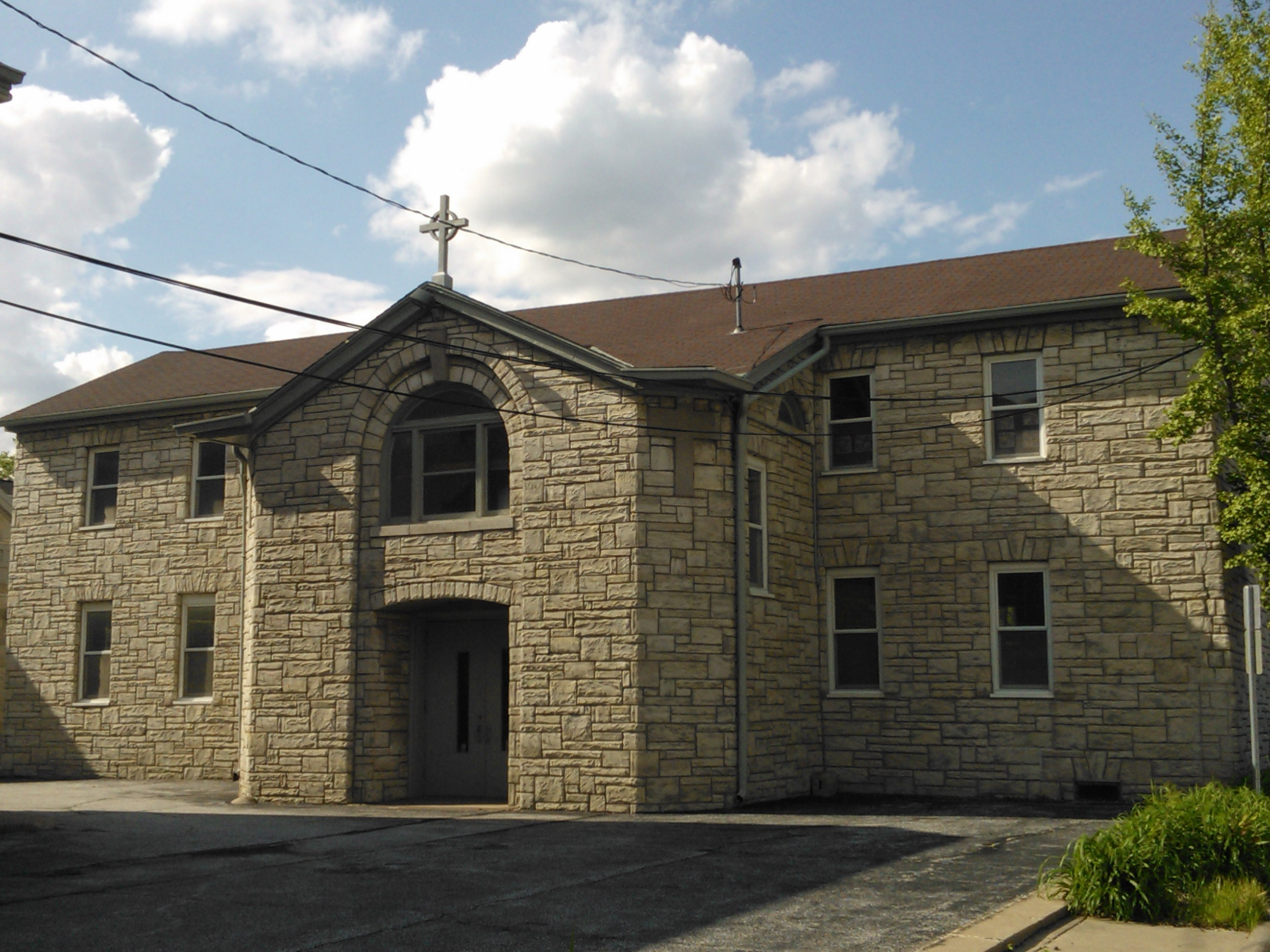
Original St. Anthony's Church (1838)

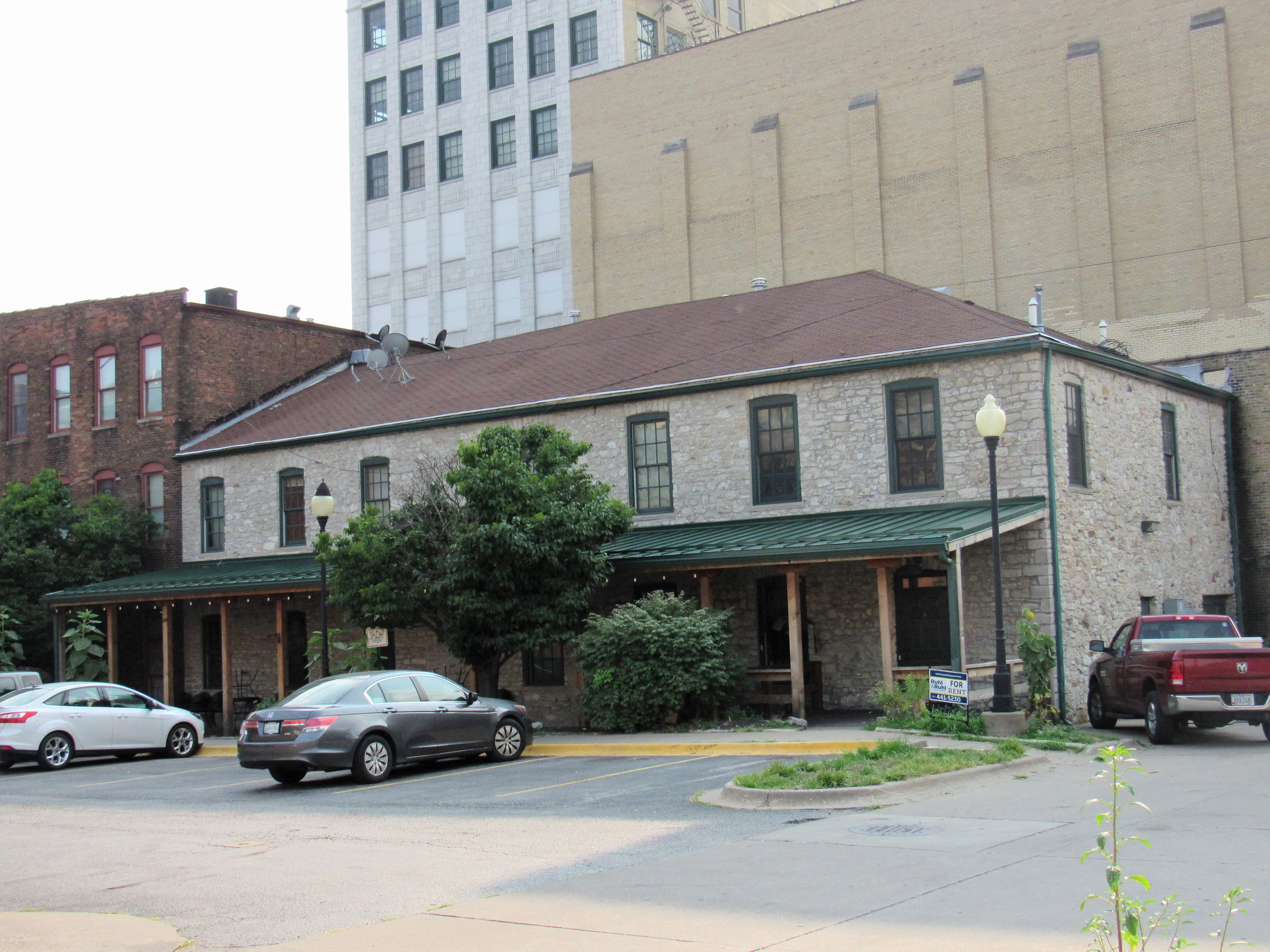
Woeber Carriage Works (1857)

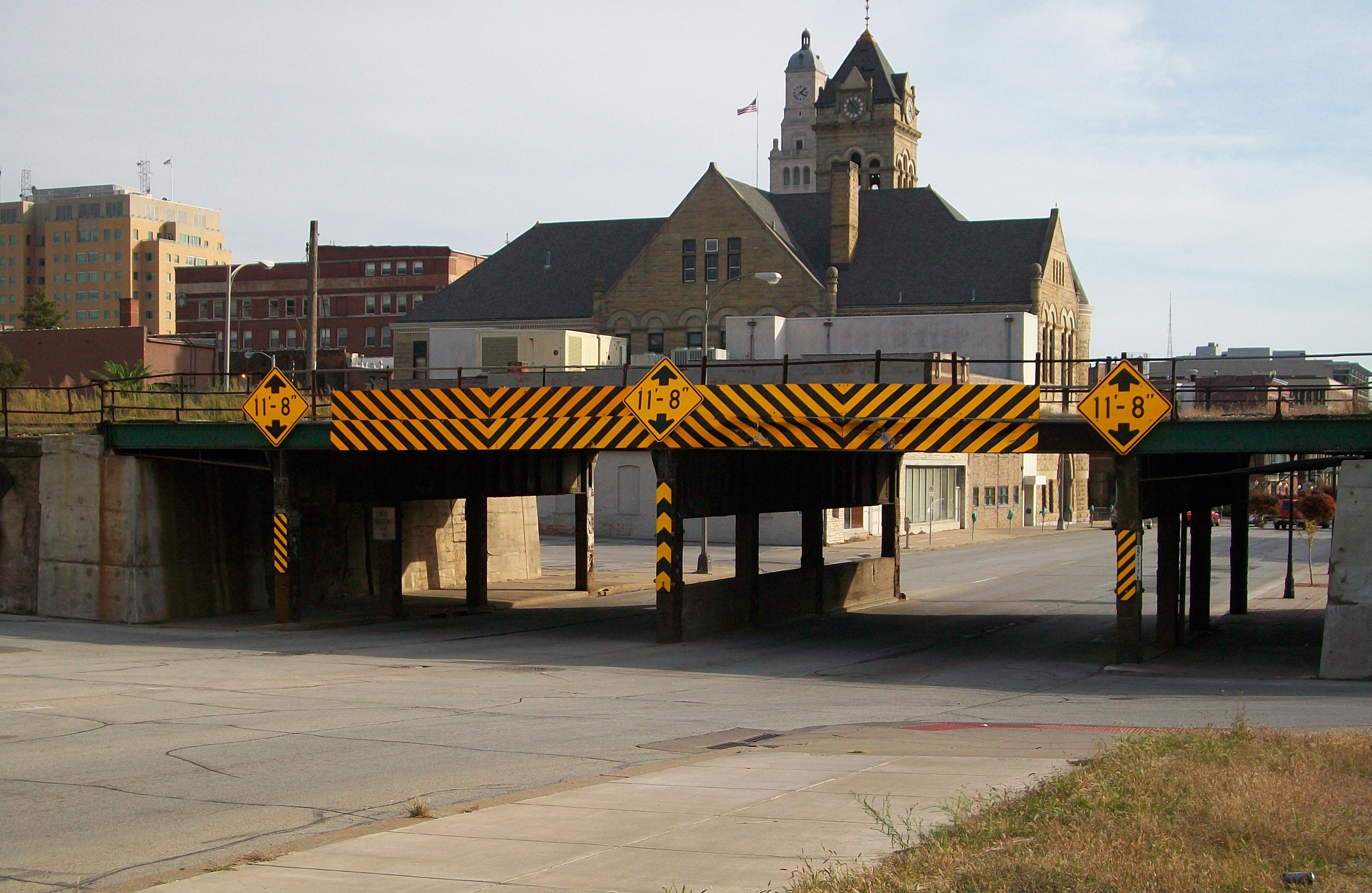
Elevated railroad tracks (1907)

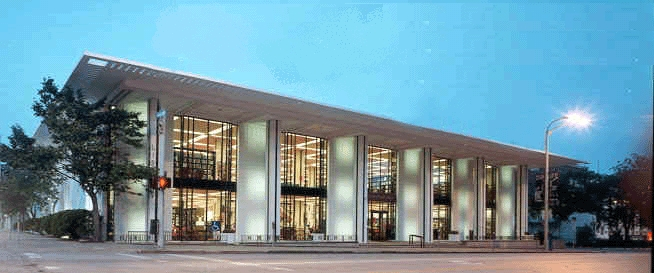
Davenport Public Library (1968)
