= First Baptist Church (Davenport, Iowa) =

- Calvary Baptist Church/ First Baptist Church
- U.S. National Register of Historic Places
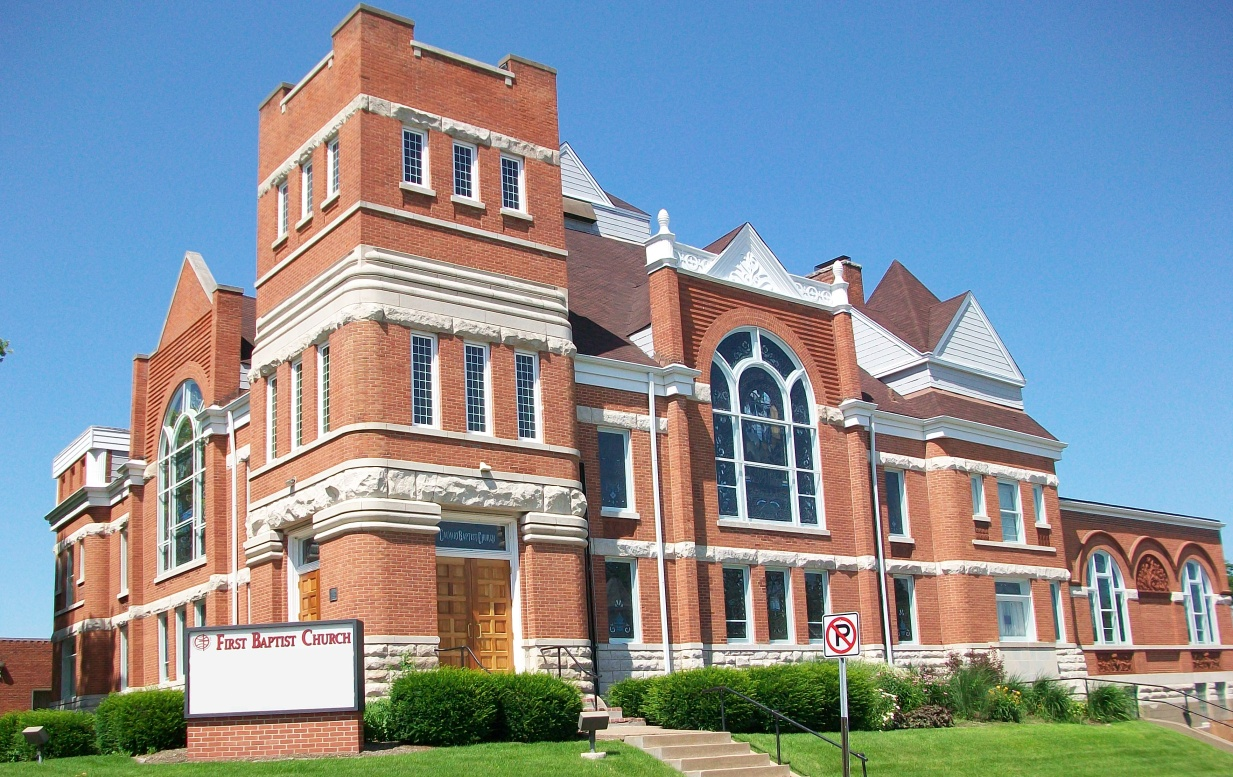
- First Baptist Church from the southwest in 2010

- Location within Iowa Location within the United States
- Location: 1401 Perry St. Davenport, Iowa
- Coordinates: 41°32′3″N 90°34′20″W
- Area: 2 acres (0.81 ha)
- Built: 1890
- Architect: John S. Woolacott
- Architectural style: Romanesque
- MPS: Davenport MRA
- NRHP reference No.: 83002409
- Added to NRHP: July 7, 1983

First Baptist Church is located in central Davenport, Iowa, United States. It was listed on the National Register of Historic Places in 1983 as Calvary Baptist Church/First Baptist Church. It is affiliated with American Baptist Churches USA.

== History ==
In 1839 First Baptist Church organized and held its first service in the home of John M. Eldridge on Brady Street. The Rev. Israel Fisher was its first pastor. The charter members were: J. M. Eldridge, Mary Eldridge, John Swartout, Charles Swartout, Mr. and Mrs. Richard Price and Mr. and Mrs. David Wilson. Richard Price and David Wilson were the church's first deacons.

Baptists then occupied a series of buildings in the city. They moved into a room over a store on Front Street, now River Drive. Services were held there until the congregation built a brick structure at the corner of Fourth and Brady Streets on a lot donated by Antoine LeClaire. The congregation met there until they moved into a new building on the corner of Sixth and Main Streets. They sold the Brady Street location to St. Luke's Episcopal Church.

In October 1851 sixteen persons who had taken letters from the First Baptist Church met in a schoolhouse on Perry Street to organize Second Baptist Church. The first officers of the church were Dr. J. M. Witherwax, C. G. Blood, W. M. Crosson, Levi Davis and J. Solomon.

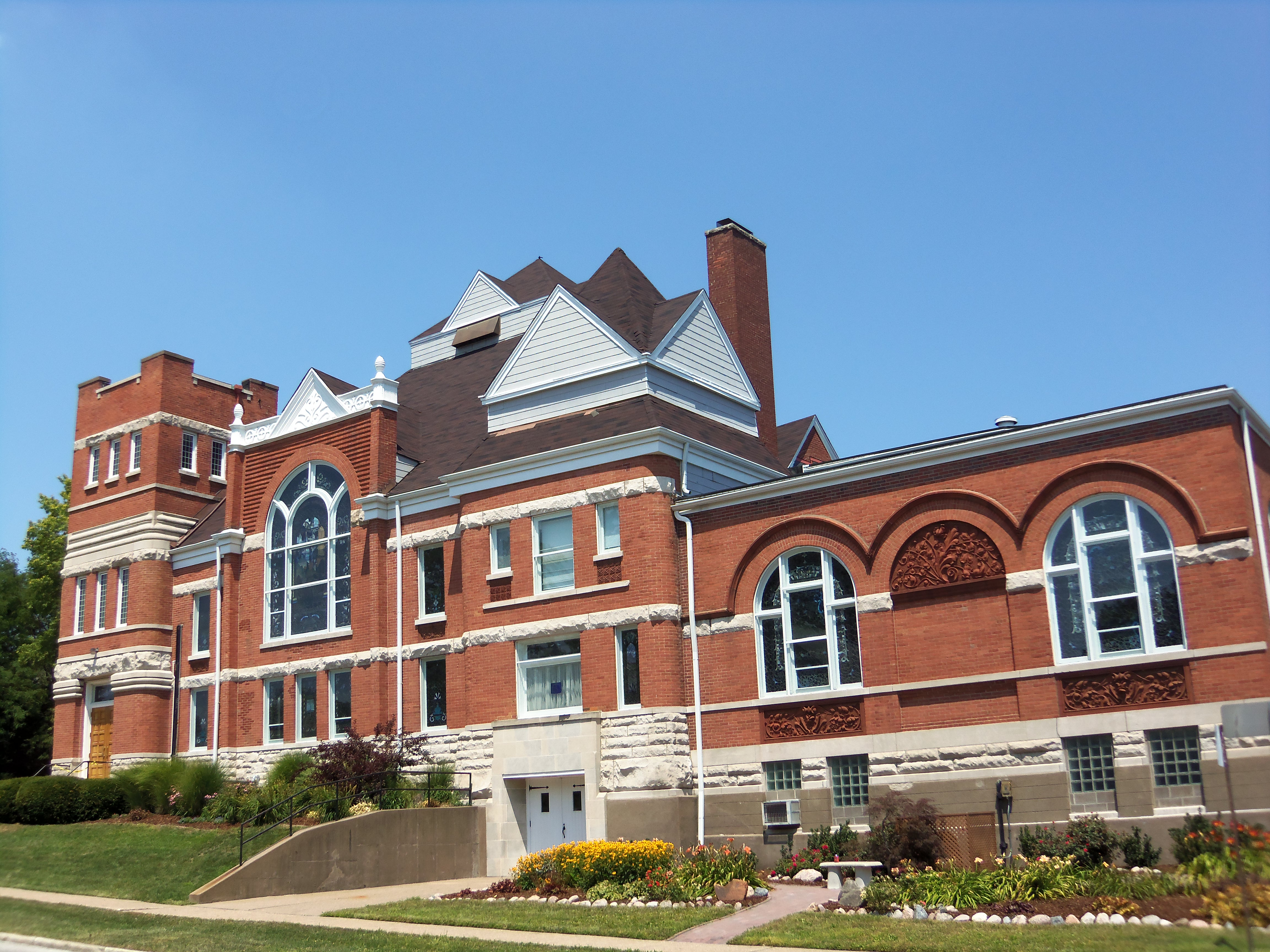
First Baptist Church from the southeast

The Second Baptist congregation purchased a house on the northwest corner of Fourth and Perry Streets and held services there. In 1852 they sold this lot and bought one on the southwest corner of Fourth and Perry. A short time later they moved to Third and Brady Streets into a place called the Medical College. That same year the Rev. E.M. Miles joined the community as its pastor. He stayed for five years, and toward the end of his pastorate, they built a church building at the corner of Fourth and Perry Streets.

Second Baptist incurred considerable debt in building its new building. Soon after the building was completed both First and Second Baptist were joined. In 1864 the Rev. D.S. Watson became the pastor, the debt was canceled, and the church was renamed Calvary Regular Baptist Church. On May 6, 1886, under the pastorate of the Rev. Frank L. Wilkins, D.D. the congregation decided to build a new church building on the corner of Perry and Fourteenth Streets.

The property for the new church was acquired for $3,400. Chicago architect John S. Woolacott designed the structure that was built by John Whittaker. The cornerstone for the new building was laid on September 21, 1889, and it was dedicated on Sunday, May 25, 1890. The total cost of the building and its furnishing was $33,000. That price included a pipe organ, which cost $3,100.

In 1968 the congregation reverted to the name First Baptist Church.

== Architecture ==
First Baptist is a late 19th-century interpretation of the Romanesque style inspired by Henry Hobson Richardson known as Richardsonian Romanesque. It combines late Victorian polychrome surface areas with a shingle-style roofline treatment. The sanctuary is nearly square in plan and features a very high hipped roof with blind dormers, corner pavilions, and a three-stage tower. The structure was built of red brick and rough stone. It incorporates wide, rounded arch windows in its massive form. They are accompanied by smaller rectangular windows that are grouped in twos and threes. Period stained glass fills the window openings. The corner tower originally had a spire on top. It was removed in the 1950s after it was damaged in a storm. A classroom wing is attached to the sanctuary.
