= Scott County Jail (Iowa) =

- U.S. National Register of Historic Places
- U.S. Historic district – Contributing property
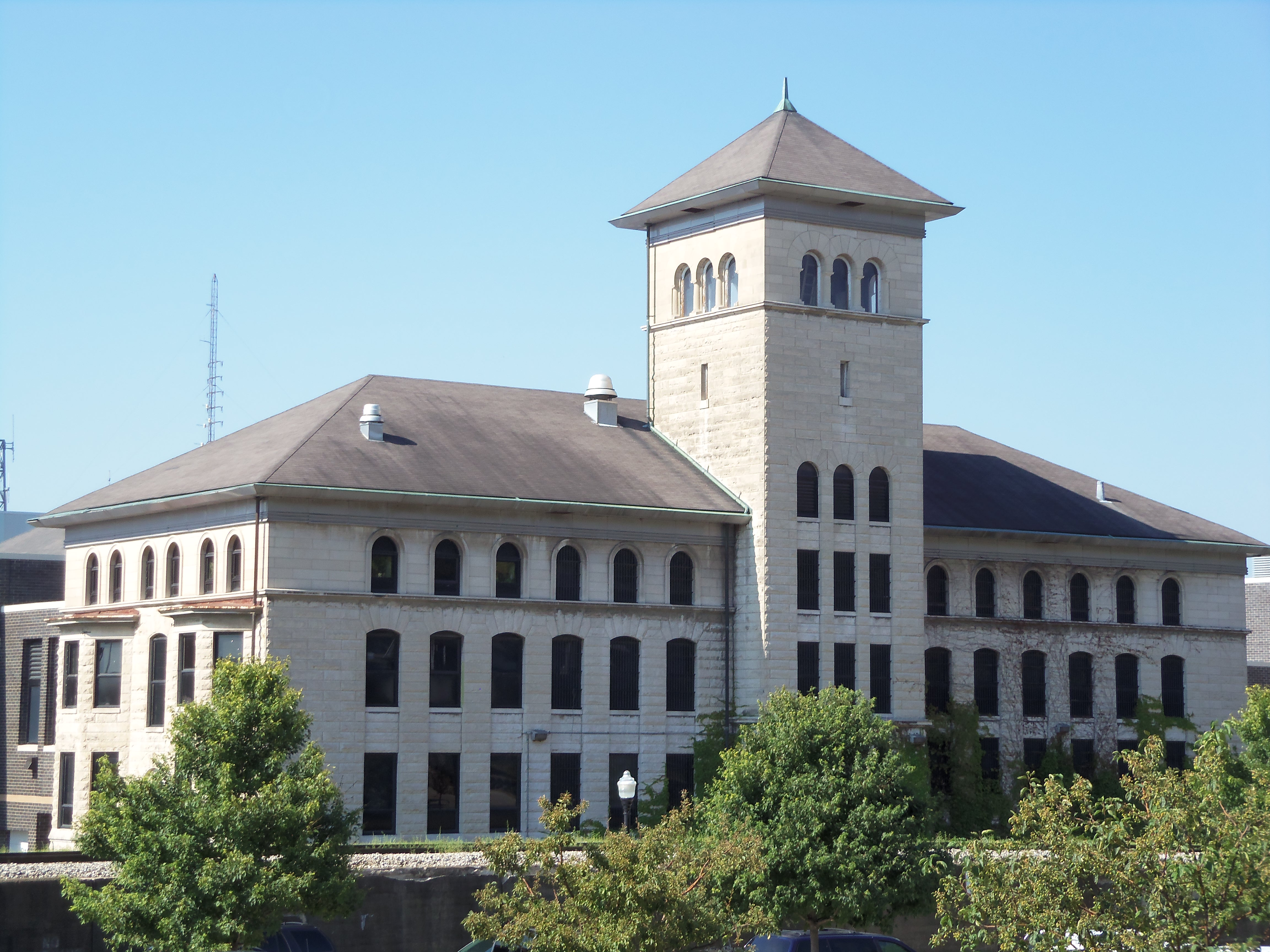
- 1897 jail in 2012

- Location within Iowa Location within the United States
- Location: 428 Ripley St. Davenport, Iowa
- Coordinates: 41°31′28″N 90°34′45″W
- Area: 1 acre (0.40 ha)
- Built: 1897
- Built by: Larkin
- Architect: Frederick G. Clausen
- Architectural style: Italianate
- Part of: Davenport Downtown Commercial Historic District (ID100005546)
- MPS: Davenport MRA
- NRHP reference No.: 83002502
- Added to NRHP: July 07, 1983

The Scott County Jail is the main detention facility for Scott County, Iowa, United States. Inmates are housed for no more than one year, by Iowa law. It is located in the county seat, Davenport, and is part of same facility as the Scott County Courthouse.

== History ==
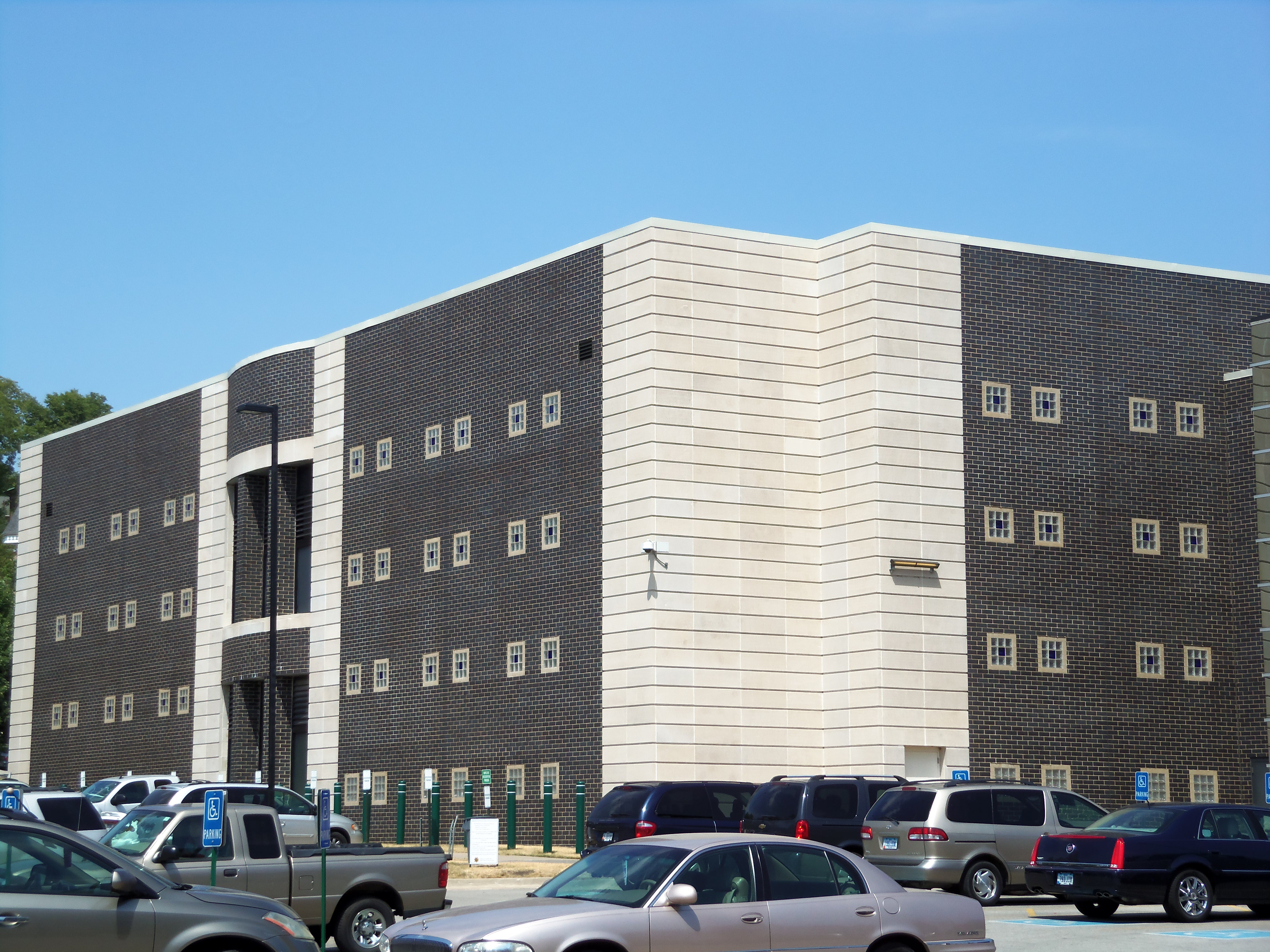
Scott County Jail's 2007 expansion

The oldest section of the jail was completed in 1897, but its opening was delayed until its metal jail cells were completed the following year. It was designed by prominent Davenport architect Frederick G. Clausen in the Italianate style. The style, which was popular in the late Victorian Era can be found in the limestone's rusticated finish on the lower stories and then rising to a smooth finish at the attic level. Other elements include the smaller scale, round-arched windows across the third-floor, the wide eaves and the tower on the building's north side. A tunnel connected the jail to the courthouse that faced West Fourth Street. The main entrance was moved from West Fifth Street to Ripley Street when the Chicago, Rock Island and Pacific Railroad tracks were elevated in 1903. The building was individually listed on the National Register of Historic Places in 1983. In 2020 it was included as a contributing property in the Davenport Downtown Commercial Historic District.

An annex was added to the jail in 1983 to alleviate crowding. It was built between the jail and the courthouse, and connected the two buildings. The jail became too small again, and in 1999 the inmate capacity was capped at 214. In 2004 a bond referendum was passed by county voters to expand the size of the jail. The $29.7 million expansion was opened in 2007. A new entrance pavilion that provides security screening to the entire complex was added at the same time. An annex that was opened on the north side of Davenport to house inmates was closed when the main jail was enlarged.

The 2007 addition is a four-story structure, and faces south on West Fourth Street in Downtown Davenport. The 75,000-square-foot (7,000 m^{2}) jail has a capacity of 354 inmates.
