= F. H. Miller House =

Historic house in Iowa, United States

- U.S. National Register of Historic Places
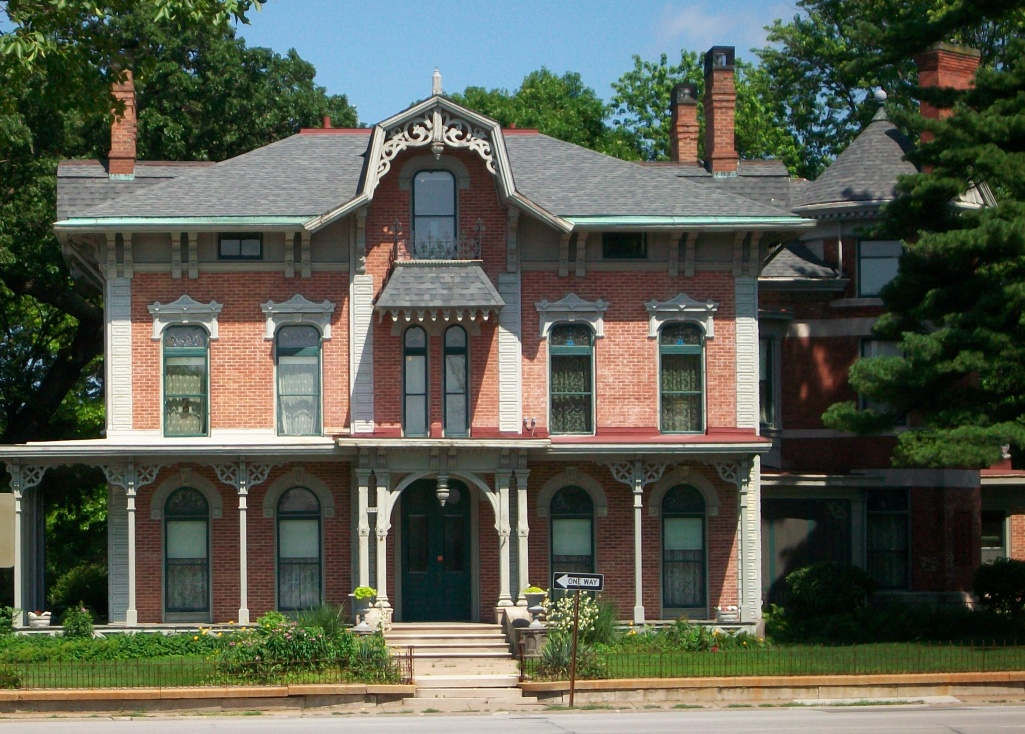

- Location within Iowa Location within the United States
- Location: 1527 Brady St. Davenport, Iowa
- Coordinates: 41°32′09″N 90°34′26″W
- Area: Less than 1 acre (0.40 ha)
- Built: 1871
- Built by: John Drew
- Architect: W. L. Carroll
- Architectural style: Italianate
- MPS: Davenport MRA
- NRHP reference No.: 83002472
- Added to NRHP: July 7, 1983

The F. H. Miller House is a historic building located in the central part of Davenport, Iowa, United States. The house served as the official residence for two of Davenport's Catholic bishops and as a bed and breakfast. In 2008, the building then housed the Office of Advancement and Alumni Relations for St. Ambrose University, and was called the St. Ambrose Alumni House. In November 2023, it was purchased privately from the university and is now The Hilltop Inn of Davenport. The property is currently being restored and preserved as best as possible to many of its original styles and furnishings. The Hilltop Inn of Davenport has recently began business and is operating as a vacation rental (Airbnb and Vrbo) and an event rental center for various gatherings. It has been listed on the National Register of Historic Places since 1983.

== History ==
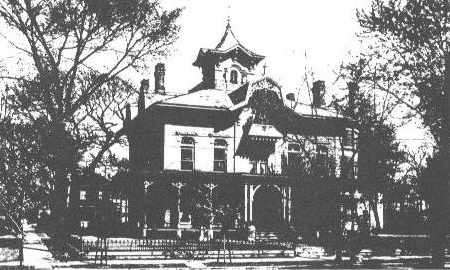
The house at the time that Bishop James Davis resided there. Note the cupola, or belvedere, on the top.

The house was built by John Drew for John Dahms in 1871. He lost his fortune and was forced to sell the house in a sheriff's sale in 1880 to Frank H. Miller, a wholesale grocer. He had been Davenport's largest wholesale grocer and jobber from the Civil War to the turn of the 20th century.

In 1907 the house was purchased by the Catholic Diocese of Davenport for $26,500 and it became the residence and headquarters for the diocese's bishop, James Davis. Previous bishops had resided at the Antoine LeClaire House in Davenport. Bishop Davis moved into the Miller House on June 24, and a desk was placed in the corner of the living room for the Rev. Joseph P. Stahl, who served as both chancellor and secretary to the bishop. Davis established the first Carmelite Monastery in the Midwest adjacent to the home in 1911. He continued to live in the residence until his death in 1926. His successor, Henry Rohlman, lived in the house until 1933 when he moved to the Selma Schricker House on Clay Street. The Miller House became the novitiate for the Sisters of St. Francis of Clinton, Iowa. After the sisters moved out in 1941 it was bought by Thomas Hinrichsen and the house was divided into six apartments to house workers at the Rock Island Arsenal. It was listed on the National Register of Historic Places in 1983.

The house was bought from Hinrichsen by Herb Tyler in 1989 and was completely renovated and turned into a bed and breakfast called the Bishop's House Inn, which was named after the two bishops who had made it their home. St. Ambrose University bought the bed and breakfast in 1995 and operated it until May 2008. At that time the building was repurposed to hold private and public functions on the ground floor, and office space on the upper floors.

== Architecture ==
W. L. Carroll was the architect for the residence, which was built in the Italianate style by John Drew. The house is constructed of red brick and features stone trim and a porch that wraps around the ground floor of the building. At one time the exterior was stuccoed and painted. The three-story structure has elaborate bracketed cornices, and was originally topped with a belvedere. The house has five bays across the front with a door in the center bay. The Gambrel roof dormers are a unique feature of this house. It was one of the first Italianate houses in Davenport that utilized windows shaped other than rectangular.
