= Scott County Courthouse (Iowa) =

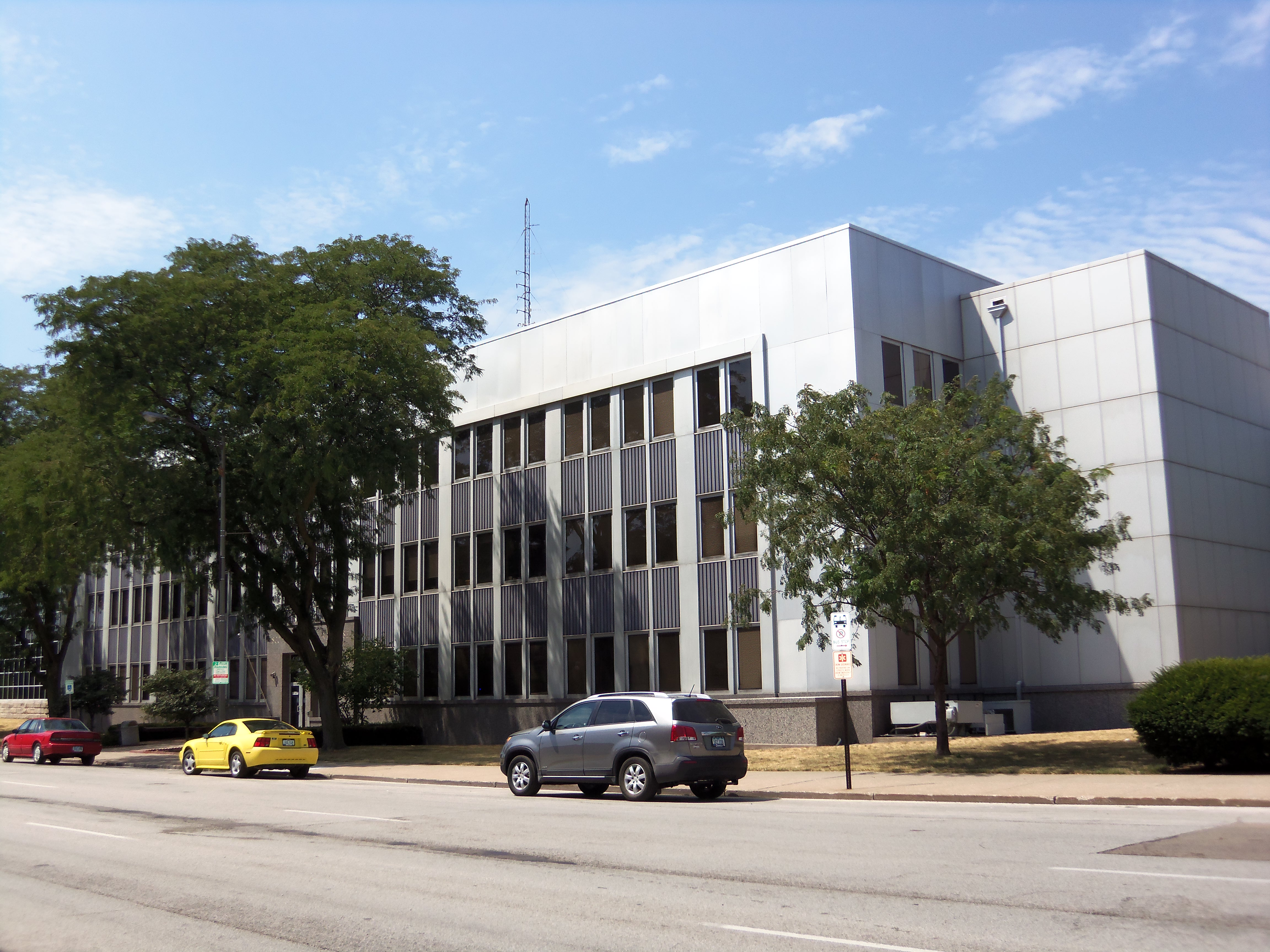
- Scott County Courthouses in 2012

General information
- Type: Courthouse
- Architectural style: International Style
- Location: 400 W. 4th St., Davenport, Iowa, United States
- Coordinates: 41.523889°N 90.579167°W
- Construction started: 1955
- Completed: 1956
- Inaugurated: October 21, 1956
- Renovated: 1998-2009
- Cost: $1,480,000 ($13.8 million renovation)
- Owner: Scott County

Technical details
- Floor count: Three
- Floor area: 84,000 square feet (7,800 m^{2})

Design and construction
- Architect: Arthur Ebeling (Associate Architect)
- Architecture firm: Dougher, Rich & Woodburn
- Main contractor: Priester Construction Co.

Other information
- Public transit: Davenport CitiBus
- Scott County Courthouse
- U.S. Historic district – Contributing property
- Part of: Davenport Downtown Commercial Historic District (ID100005546)
- Added to NRHP: September 11, 2020

The Scott County Courthouse in Davenport, Iowa, United States was built from 1955 to 1956 and extensively renovated over a ten-year period between 1998 and 2009. It is the third building the county has used for court functions and county administration. It is part of a larger county complex that includes the county jail, administration building and juvenile detention facility. In 2020 the courthouse was included as a contributing property in the Davenport Downtown Commercial Historic District on the National Register of Historic Places.

== History ==
Scott County was established in 1837 by the legislature of the Wisconsin Territory. Until this time the area had been a part of Des Moines County. The first court sessions in the county were held in St. Anthony's Catholic Church. The juries met in a room that was made available by George Davenport.

=== County Seat election ===
Davenport and Rockingham, a town a mile south on the Mississippi River, contended for the county seat. An election was held in February 1838. Because the population base at the time was in the southern part of the county, Rockingham was favored. Davenport's promoters paid $3,000 in whiskey and bribes to miners from Dubuque, Iowa to vote for Davenport, which won the election. Rockingham contested the election and a new election was set for August 1838. A rule was put in place whereby one had to be a resident for at least 60 days in order to vote in the election. Both towns' promoters defrauded the ballot box this time. Laborers were imported to work in the mills at least 60 days before the election and Illinois citizens were invited to vote. When the county commissioners purged the polls after the election Davenport won by two votes. Rockingham again protested and the legislature of the Iowa Territory, of which Scott County had become a part in 1838, set a new election for the summer of 1840.

The third election had four jurisdictions vying for the county seat. Besides Davenport and Rockingham the geographical center of the county, or "Sloperville," entered the race as did Winfield, a town along the Mississippi near the mouth of Duck Creek. Sloperville dropped out early. The other three jurisdictions made offers of land, buildings, and cash. Winfield offered 90 acres (36 ha) of land and $100 in labor and materials. Rockingham made an offer to build the courthouse and jail. Davenport's promoters, especially Antoine LeClaire and George Davenport, promised to build a courthouse and jail free of charge. Davenport's offer of land, cash, and building materials was valued at $5,000. The town also stressed its more central location and that its proposed courthouse site was on higher ground away from the Mississippi River, and therefore would not flood. Rockingham and Winfield could not match the offer and Davenport won after Rockingham withdrew on the eve of the election. The election results were celebrated in Davenport with bonfires, fireworks, and speeches. Rockingham was later annexed into the city of Davenport, and Winfield is now part of Bettendorf.

=== 1842 courthouse ===
The county's first courthouse was a Greek Revival style building built in 1842. It was a two-story structure that featured stately columns and a round cupola. The building was located on Bolivar Square, one of the four public squares laid out by Antoine LeClaire when he plotted the town in 1836.

=== 1886 courthouse ===
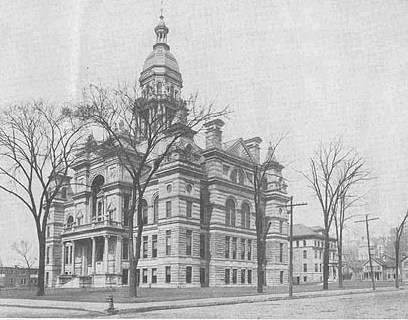
Scott County Courthouse built in 1886

As the county grew a larger courthouse was needed and an ornate Beaux Arts structure was built in 1886. It was designed by former Davenport architect John C. Cochrane. The building was constructed of Bedford stone by Lang & Moody. It measured 100 by 125 feet (30 by 38 m) and rose three stories above a raised basement. The large central dome rose to a height of 150 feet (46 m) and weighed 11,025 tons. The four corners of the building were marked by turreted towers. The exterior was decorated with elements symbolizing the pioneer experience and life in the Mississippi River Valley. Marble plaques on either side of the main entrance listed the names of the county's early pioneers. The east side of the third floor housed the James Grant Law Library, which was owned by the Scott County Bar Association. The courthouse was built at a cost of $125,000.

The courthouse, however, was built on sandy soil and slowly sank. The large vault, which had been built on the ground floor, dropped below ground level. A stairway was constructed down into the vault. Around 1930 termites began to eat away at the wood beams that supported the structure. The building continued to sink into the sandy soil it was built on, which necessitated costly repairs. To help alleviate the weight of the building the dome was removed in 1932. The courthouse continued to sink so the tower wall was torn down the following year. This time 450 tons of brick, which had supported the dome, were removed. Chemicals and other methods were used to get rid of the termites, but they failed. The county made a request for a federal grant of $6,480 to repair and prop up the foundation. It was approved and work began in 1940. Scott County voters approved a $1.5 million bond issue in 1945 to build a new courthouse and the old structure was finally torn down in March 1955. The various county offices moved into rented space in the downtown area.

=== 1956 courthouse ===
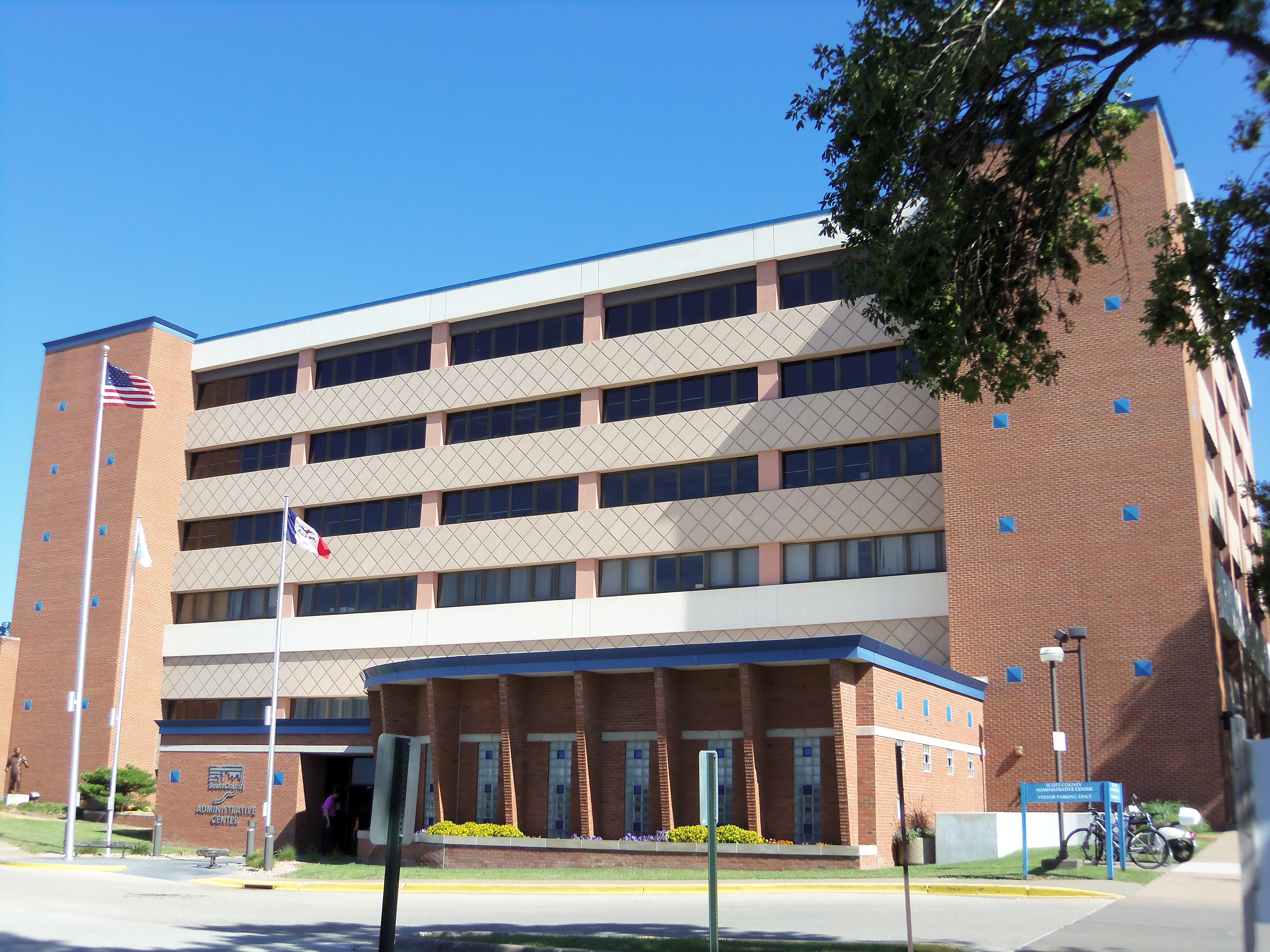
Scott County Administration Building

The present courthouse was built from 1955 to 1956 at a cost of $1,480,000. Disagreements over location, design, and cost resulted in delays and redesigns. Iowa Governor Leo Hoegh spoke at the dedication on October 21, 1956. In 1983 the courthouse and the Scott County Jail were joined together by an addition to the jail, whose original building was constructed in 1896. A ten-year $13.8 million renovation project began in 1998 after many county offices were moved from the courthouse into a new Scott County Administrative Center. Court related offices were moved into newly renovated areas during the project. In 2004 a bond referendum was passed by county voters to expand the size of the jail. The $29.7 million expansion was opened in 2007 and expanded the courthouse and jail complex with a 75,000-square-foot (7,000 m^{2}) addition. The new entrance pavilion provided security screening to the entire courthouse for the first time.

In 2010 the county board of supervisors approved a $176,000 plan to renovate the courthouse's 11 court rooms. Renovations include electrical wiring, technology upgrades, painting, replacing carpet and ceiling tiles and asbestos removal.

The Scott County Administrative Center was built as a warehouse for a transfer company in the 1930s. It was acquired by the county in 1974, and the first sections of the building were occupied by the county in 1976. The building was called the Bicentennial Building for 27 years. It was extensively renovated with the addition of the sixth floor. That project was completed in 2003. The building houses both county and state offices.

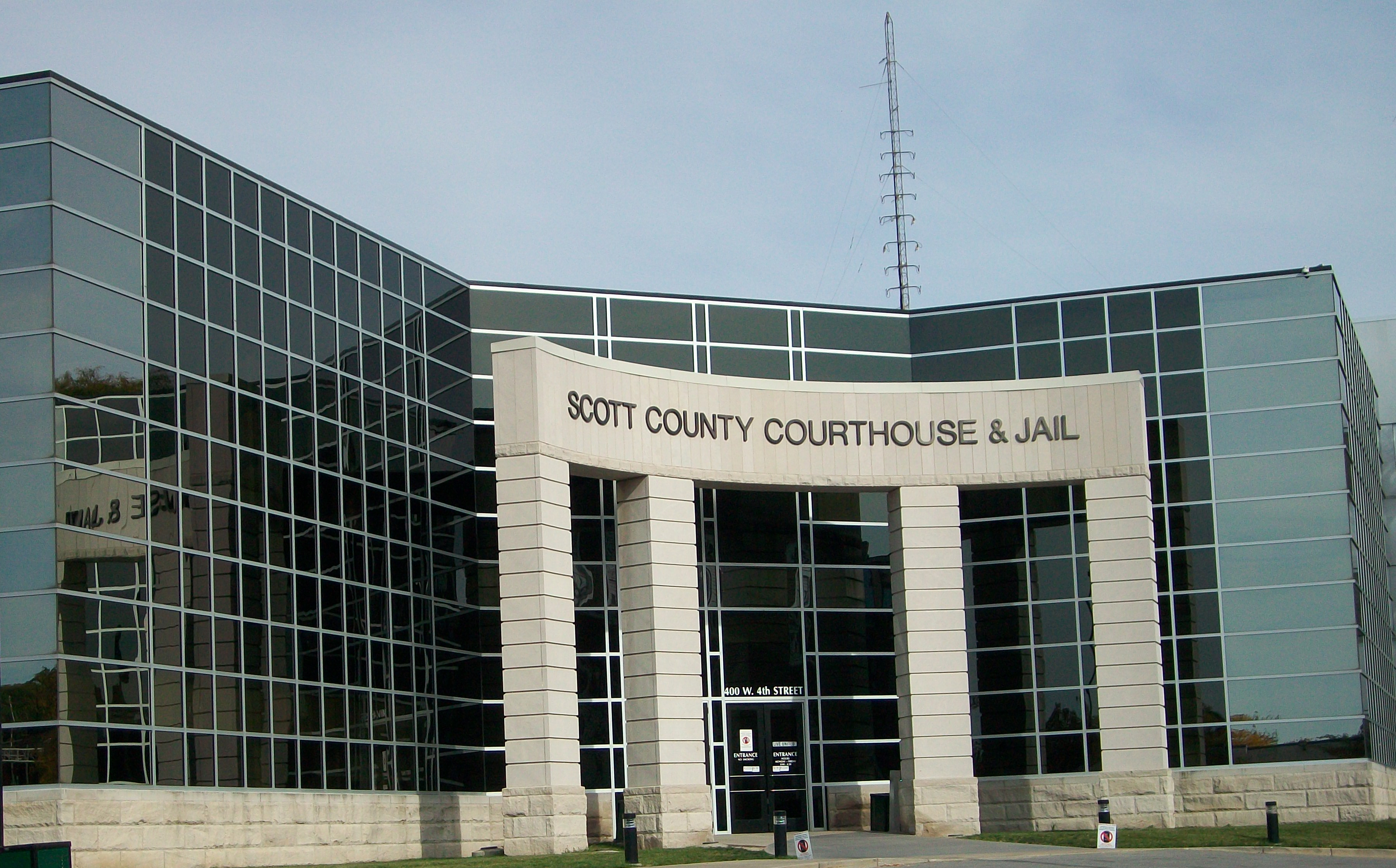
Entrance built in 2007

== Architecture ==
The 1956 courthouse itself is a three-story rectangular structure. It was designed in the modern architectural style by Chester C. Woodburn of the Des Moines architectural firm of Dougher, Rich & Woodburn. Davenport architect Arthur H. Ebeling served as the associate architect. Priester Construction Company of Davenport was the main contractor. The exterior is clad in aluminum sheets that had been rolled at Alcoa's Davenport plant in nearby Riverdale, Iowa. It was the first courthouse in the United States to be clad in aluminum. The building's foundation is faced with granite, as is the surround for what served as the building's main entrance. There are corrugated metal sections between the floors and fixed-pane windows. The building is topped by a flat roof. The interior features 84,000 square feet (7,800 m^{2}) of space. When the jail was expanded in 2007 a new entrance into the courthouse and jail complex was created on the west side of the courthouse. The new entrance pavilion has a glass and metal façade with a freestanding stone archway in front of the building.
