= Antoine Le Claire =

American businessman (1797–1861)

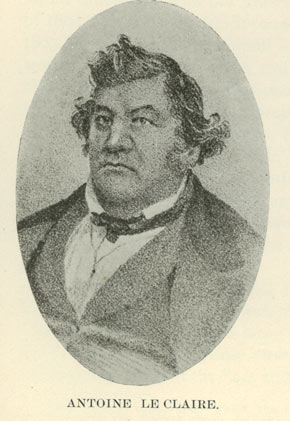
- A portrait of Le Claire derived from an oil painting
- Born: December 15, 1797; St. Joseph, Michigan
- Died: September 25, 1861 (aged 63); Davenport, Iowa
- Occupations: Interpreter, merchant
- Known for: Founding Davenport, Iowa
- Spouse: Marguerite Lepage (m. 1820)
- Children: Informally adopted nephew Louis Le Claire
- Parent: François LeClaire

Signature
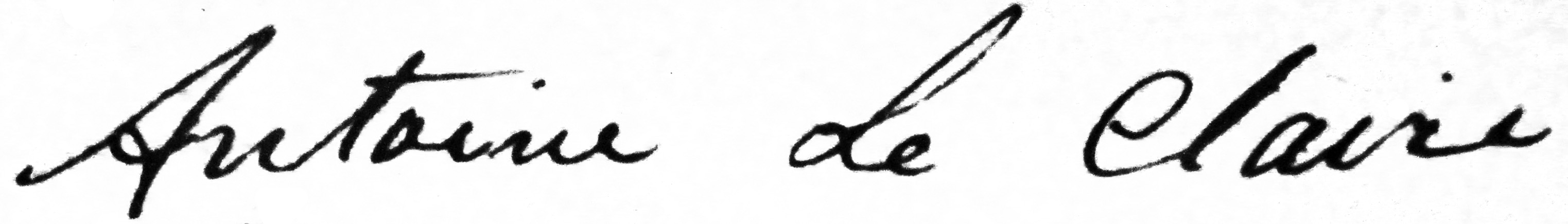

Antoine Le Claire (also LeClaire; December 15, 1797 – September 25, 1861) was an American military interpreter, businessman, philanthropist, and principal founder of Davenport, Iowa.

== Biography ==
=== Early life ===
Le Claire was born on December 15, 1797, in present-day St. Joseph, Michigan, then in the Northwest Territory. His father, François Le Claire, was French Canadian and came to the Americas with Lafayette. His mother was a Native American from the Potawatomi tribe. His father opened a trading post in Milwaukee, Wisconsin, where he traded with several Native American tribes. François supported the side of the United States during the War of 1812. He was subsequently captured by the territorial militia at his trading post in Peoria, Illinois, and held as a prisoner in Alton, Illinois. While his father was imprisoned, Antoine met General William Clark who was impressed with Le Claire's faculty with languages; Clark sent Antoine to school to improve his English and he entered government service. Le Claire spoke English, French, Spanish, and a dozen Native American dialects. He came to Fort Armstrong in 1818, where he became the interpreter for Colonel George Davenport. A short time later, he moved to Peoria, where he met and married his wife Marguerite LePage in 1820. She was born on October 16, 1802, in Portage des Sioux, St. Charles County, Missouri. She was the daughter of a French Canadian, Antoine LePage, and the granddaughter of the Sauk chief Acoqua. After Peoria the Le Claires spent a short time in Arkansas where he observed the movements of Native Americans before moving back to Fort Armstrong in 1827.

=== Landowner ===
In 1832, at the end of the Black Hawk War, Le Claire was present at the peace treaty signing as an interpreter. Sauk and Meskwaki territories west of the Mississippi River were purchased by the United States government. Because he was respected by the Native Americans, the Le Claires were given three parcels of land. One of the parcels was at the head of the Rock Island Rapids on the west side of the river. The second was given to Marguerite by Keokuk, the Sauk chief. It was also located on the west side of the river and had been the location of the Meskwaki village. Keokuk stipulated that Le Claire build a house on the spot where the peace treaty was signed, or lose the land. After the United States Congress approved the peace treaty in 1833, Le Claire built a house, known as the Treaty House. The third parcel of land was given by the Potawatomie on the Illinois side of the river where present day Moline, Illinois, is situated.

Le Claire was named the postmaster and the justice of the peace in 1833. His jurisdiction included all the lands that had been included in the Black Hawk Purchase. He was responsible for resolving disputes between the Native Americans and the white settlers. He generally took a hands-off approach which the independent-minded settlers found appealing. In 1834 he established the area's first ferry service across the river. LeClaire also served as Black Hawk's translator when the Sauk warrior wrote his memoirs.

=== Davenport ===
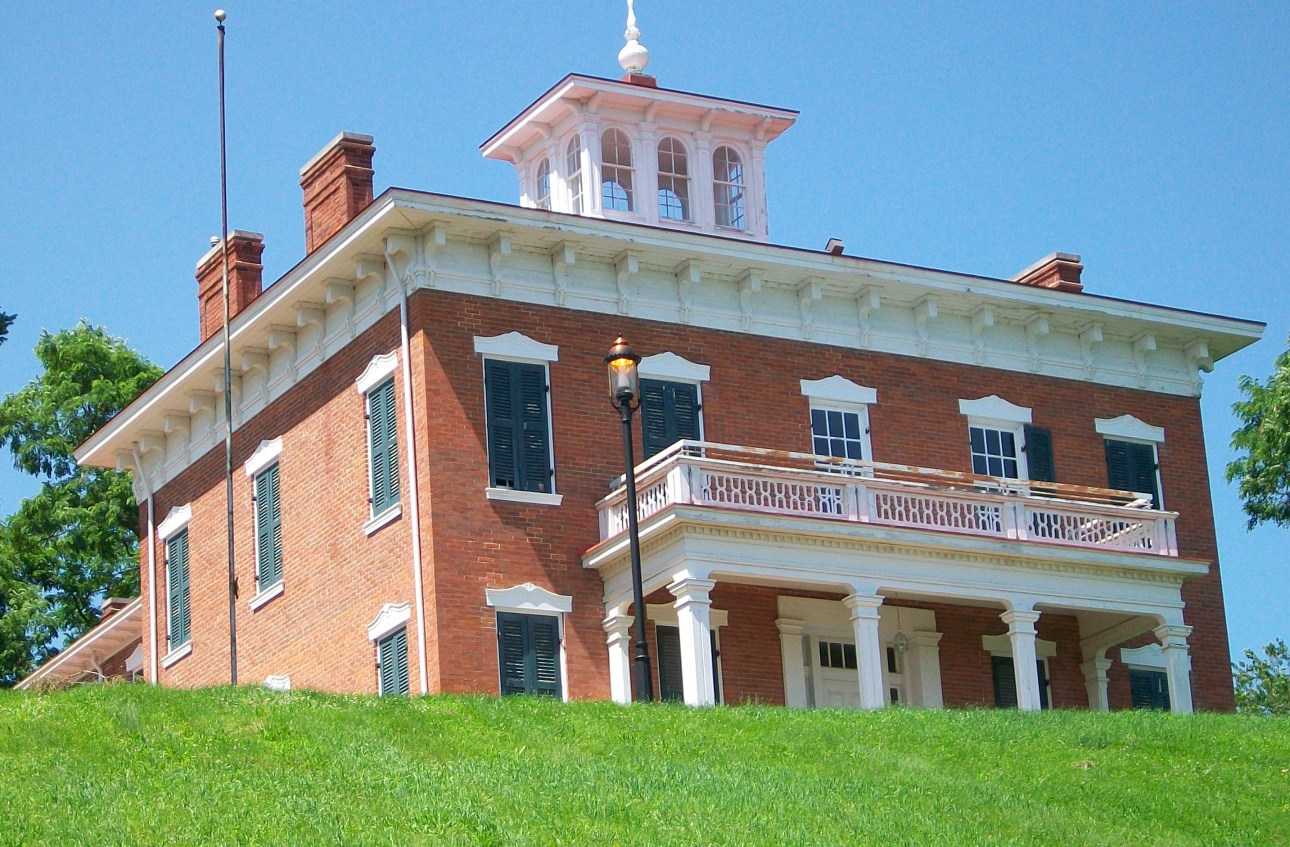
Antoine LeClaire House (1855)

George Davenport gathered a group of investors at his home on February 23, 1836, to create a company in order to develop a new town. It was to be located on the Iowa side of the Mississippi River opposite the town of Stevenson, Illinois, which is now the city of Rock Island. Antoine Le Claire was part of the group. While he owned a great deal of land, he did not have a great deal of money. The other investors paid him $1,750 for the site that now lies between the river and Seventh Street and between Harrison Street to just past Warren Street.

While Le Claire was the driving force in the development of Davenport, the town was not named for him. Not only did he not have enough money to develop buildings on the land, but he was also a half-breed with a French surname and a devout Catholic. The other investors had English surnames, money to invest and government contracts. George Davenport also failed to have his name attached to the new town across the river (Stevenson), and so the town on the Iowa side of the river was named after him.

Le Claire had the town laid out in the conventional fashion of a grid pattern of 36 squares. Three of the squares were set aside for public squares: Lafayette Square, which is a public park today; Bolivar Square, site of the Scott County Courthouse; and Washington Square, present site of the downtown YMCA. The levee along the river was also left open for public use. The east–west streets but one were named for Native American tribes: Sac, Fox (another name for the Meskwaki), Ottawa, Chippewa, and Potawatomie. Later those streets would be renamed Second through Sixth Streets. Front Street, now River Drive, was along the levee. The north–south streets retain their original names: Ripley, Scott, Western, Gaines, Brown and Warren.

=== Businessman ===
Le Claire joined with George Davenport to develop the first public house in the area, which was named the Le Claire House. He also established the first foundry in the young town, and with A. C. Fulton he built the first mill. He was involved with a group of investors who brought the railroad to Davenport in the 1850s. On his property north of the Rock Island Rapids Le Claire owned and operated a sandstone quarry. Stone from this quarry was used for the Clock Tower on Rock Island Arsenal, the first buildings on the Augustana College campus in Rock Island, and the abutments on the Government Bridge.

=== Philanthropy ===
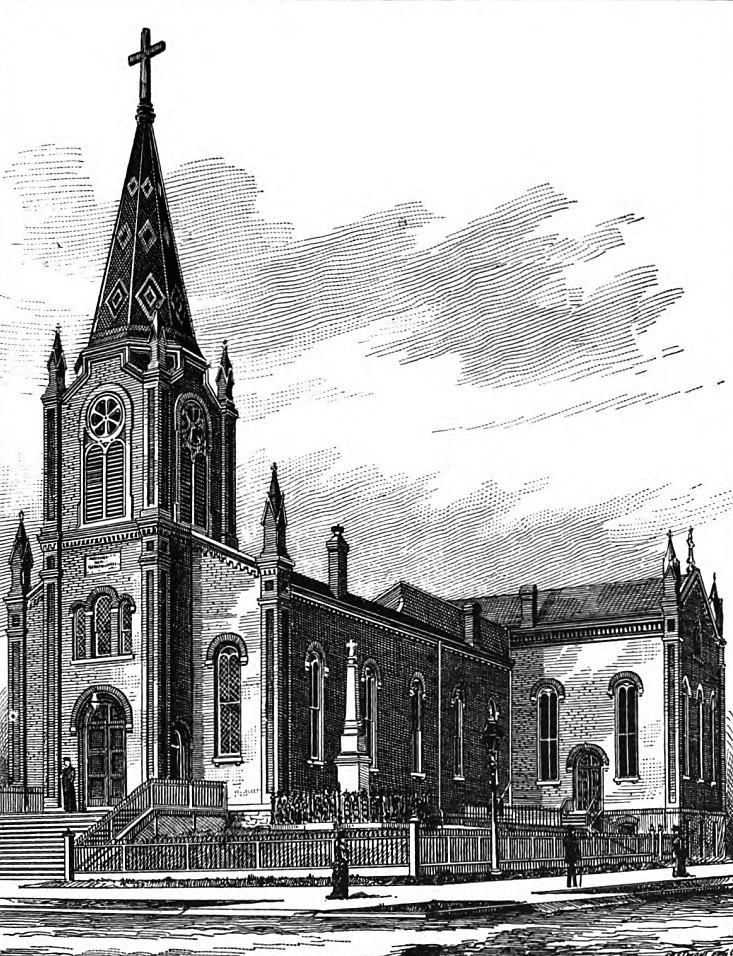
St. Marguerite's Church, later Davenport's first Catholic Cathedral, with the Le Claire grave in the foreground.

When the first addition was made to Davenport, Le Claire set aside one of the squares for a Catholic church. In April 1837 he joined with the missionary priest Samuel Charles Mazzuchelli to lay the cornerstone for the original St. Anthony's Church. The title to the property, named Church Square, was deeded to Bishop Mathias Loras of Dubuque in 1839 to support the Catholic Church in Davenport. Because of this support Davenport was named a See City with its own bishop in 1881. When the church decided to establish a third parish in Davenport, Le Claire donated another square on a bluff on the east side of the city for St. Marguerite's, also called St. Margaret's. The LeClaires also built and furnished the rectory, and provided financial support for building the new church. Le Claire donated property two miles outside of Davenport for St. Marguerite's Cemetery. Both St. Anthony's and St. Marguerite's were named in honor of the LeClaires for their generosity. Antoine LeClaire had also been a member of the St. Anthony's choir, where he played the bass viol. While they were devout Catholics their generosity was not limited to the Catholic Church. LeClaire also provided the land for the initial First Baptist Church, Edwards Congregational, and other churches.

The Le Claires' philanthropy existed in other areas of society as well. He donated Bolivar Square to Scott County, which sealed Davenport's attempt to be named the county seat. In 1846 he donated the land for the establishment of Iowa College, which eventually left Davenport and became Grinnell College. In 1855 he built a new house and donated the Treaty House to the Mississippi and Missouri Railroad and it became Davenport's first railroad station. The LeClaires hosted members of the Sauk and Meskwaki tribes, who camped on their estate and were allowed to stay as long as they liked.

=== Later life and death ===
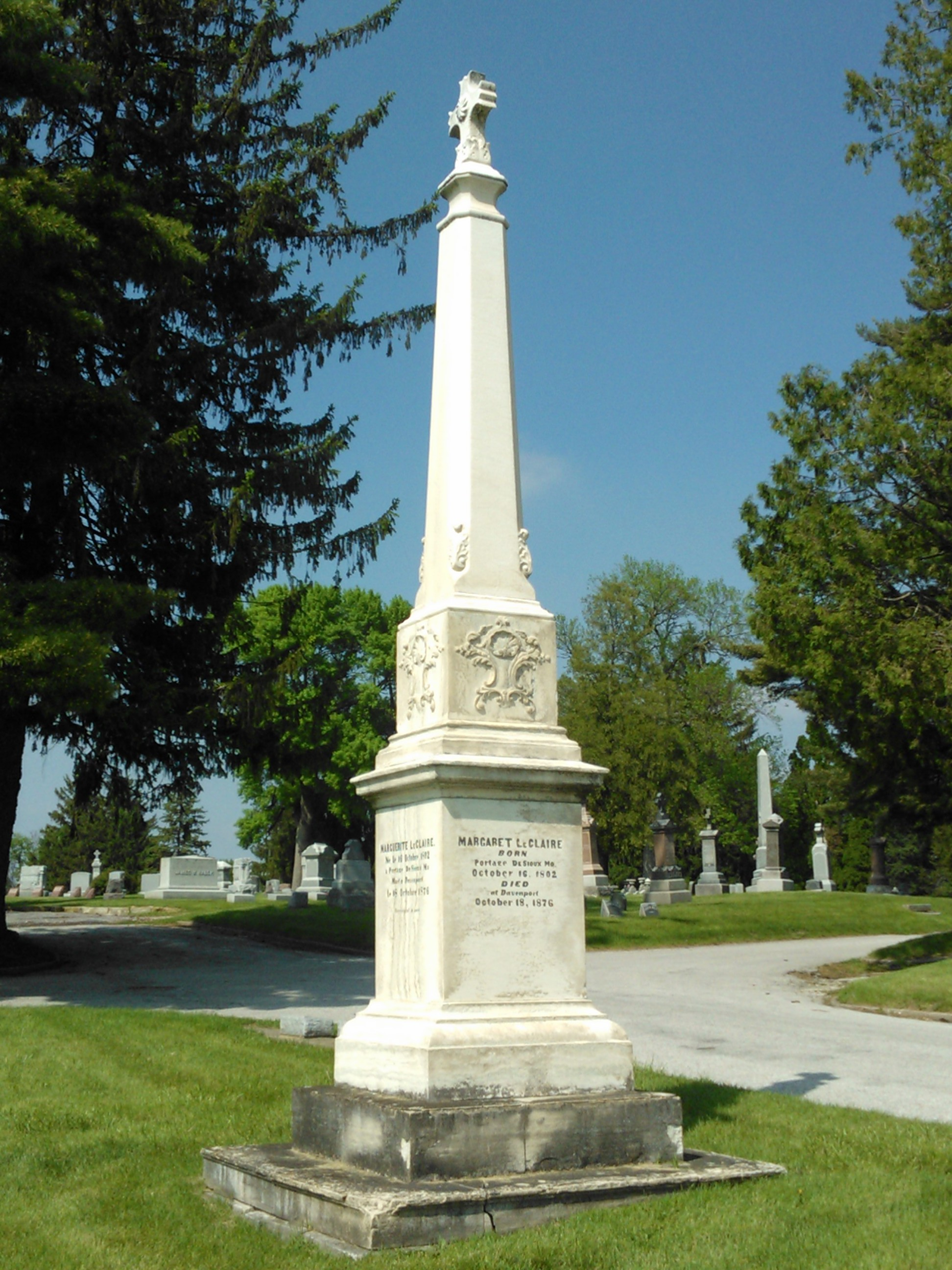
Le Claire Graves at Mt. Calvary Cemetery

The Le Claires had no children of their own. When his half brother Alexis died in 1849 Antoine and Marguerite informally adopted his son Louis. He even introduced Louis to former President Millard Fillmore as "my boy."

During the Panic of 1857 many banks in the Midwest failed, and the Cook and Sargent Bank in Davenport appeared to be in danger. Le Claire called for calm among the citizens of Davenport and to keep their money in the bank. He assured them the bank was secure and guaranteed its safety with his own money. The bank, however, failed for other reasons and Le Claire still made good on his promise. The strain may have hastened his death.

Antoine Le Claire died on September 25, 1861. His funeral was held in St. Marguerite's Church and he was buried in the church yard. The Rev. J.A.M. Pelamourgues from St. Anthony's presided at the funeral with two other priests. The Rev. John Donlan preached the funeral sermon. Marguerite Le Claire died on October 18, 1876, and was buried next to her husband. When Sacred Heart Cathedral was built in 1891, and St. Marguerite's was torn down, the Le Claires' bodies were moved to St. Marguerite's Cemetery, now Mount Calvary Cemetery.

== Legacy ==
Numerous places in the Quad City area of Iowa and Illinois are named for Le Claire. They include:

- Le Claire, Iowa, established on LeClaire's property above the Rock Island Rapids
  - Le Claire Township, Scott County, Iowa
- LeClaire Hotel, Moline, Illinois
- LeClaire Park, Davenport
- LeClaire Street, Davenport
