= Picklum =

Picklum is a surname. Notable people with the surname include:

- Molly Picklum (born 2002), Australian surfer

== See also ==
- Frank Picklum House, historic building in Davenport, Iowa
