= Frank Picklum House =

Historic house in Iowa, United States

- U.S. National Register of Historic Places
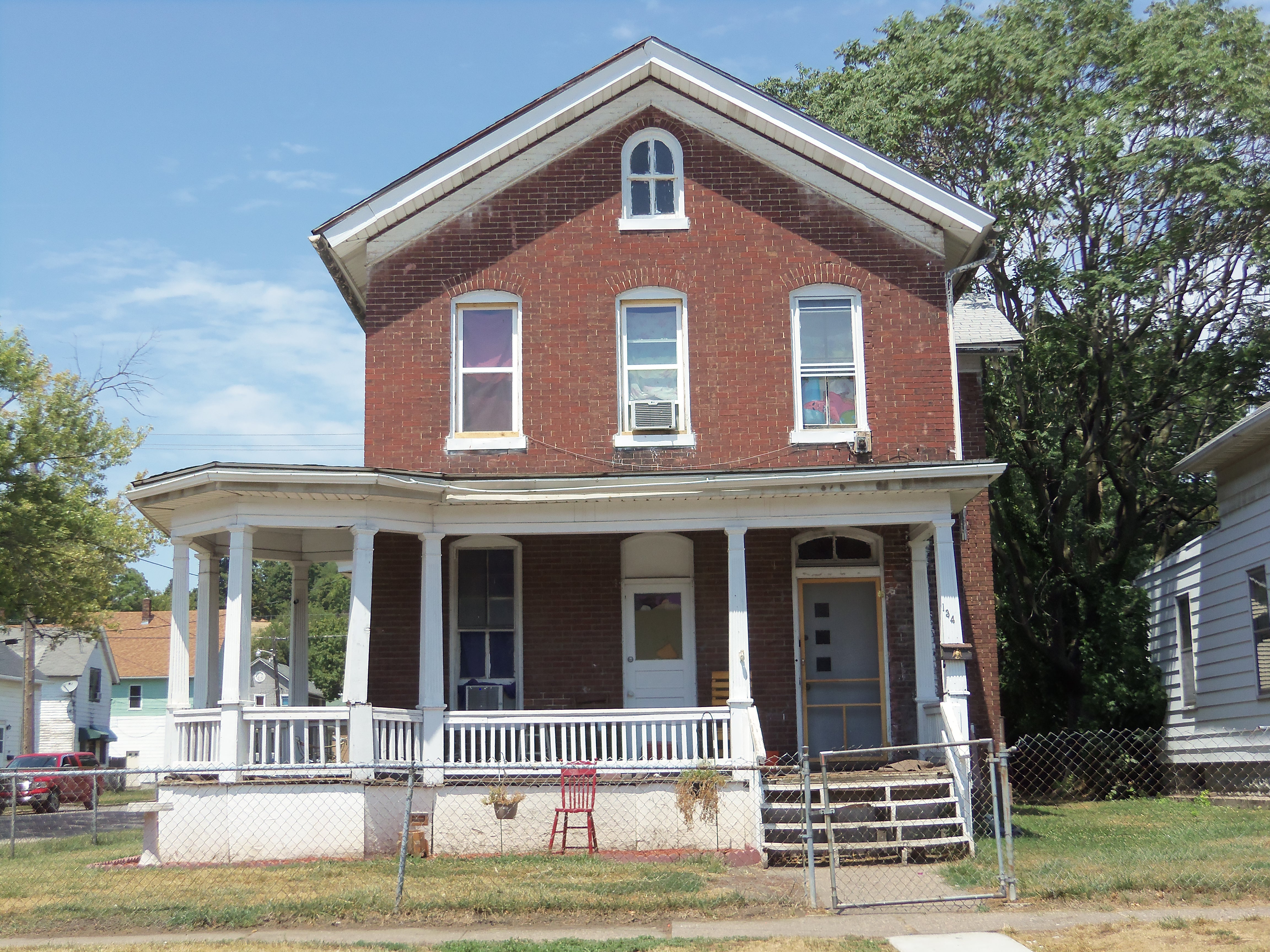

- Location within Iowa Location within the United States
- Location: 1340 W. 7th St. Davenport, Iowa
- Coordinates: 41°31′36″N 90°35′38″W
- Area: less than one acre
- Built: 1881
- MPS: Davenport MRA
- NRHP reference No.: 84001515
- Added to NRHP: July 27, 1984

The Frank Picklum House is a historic building located in the West End of Davenport, Iowa, United States. Picklum, who was a bricklayer and later a contractor, was the first person to live in the house and may have built it. Rooms were available for rent in the house by the late 1890s, but Picklum still lived here. The house was built in the McClellan style that was popular in late 19th century Davenport. The large Colonial Revival-style porch with the polygonal bay on the west side updated what is essentially a simple style. It has been listed on the National Register of Historic Places since 1984.
