= West Marshall Community School District =

Public school district in State Center, Iowa, United States

Location
- State Center, Iowa Marshall County United States
- Coordinates: 42°01′11″N 93°10′13″W

District information
- Type: Public
- Grades: K-12
- Superintendent: Jacy Large
- Schools: 3
- Budget: $12,976,000
- NCES District ID: 1931080

Students and staff
- Students: 970 (2022-23)
- Teachers: 65.94 FTE
- Staff: 56.74 FTE
- Student–teacher ratio: 14.71
- Athletic conference: Heart of Iowa Conference
- District mascot: Trojans
- Colors: Black and Gold

Other information
- Website: wmcsd.org

West Marshall Community School District is a rural public school district in central Iowa, United States. West Marshall spans the western side of Marshall County, with a small area in Story County, and includes the small towns of State Center, Melbourne, St. Anthony, Clemons, Rhodes, and LaMoille.

== Schools ==
All of the district facilities are in State Center:

- West Marshall Elementary School
- West Marshall Intermediate School
- West Marshall Middle School
- West Marshall High School

=== West Marshall High School ===
==== Athletics ====
The Trojans compete in the Heart of Iowa Conference in the following sports:

- Cross Country
- Volleyball
- Football
- Basketball
- Wrestling
- Track and Field
- Golf
- Tennis
- Baseball
- Softball

==== State championships ====
- Football - 1999 State Champions, Class 1A
- Boys' Track and Field - 2012 State Champions, Class 2A

== See also ==
- List of school districts in Iowa
- List of high schools in Iowa
