= Minerva Creek Bridge =

- U.S. National Register of Historic Places
- Location within Iowa Location within the United States
- Location: County Road S52 over Minerva Creek
- Nearest city: Clemons, Iowa
- Coordinates: 42°08′21″N 93°09′21″W
- Area: less than one acre
- Built: 1910
- Built by: N.M. Stark and Company
- Architect: W.W. Morehouse
- Architectural style: Luten arch
- MPS: Highway Bridges of Iowa MPS
- NRHP reference No.: 98000497
- Added to NRHP: May 15, 1998

The Minerva Creek Bridge is located in Liberty Township north of Clemons, Iowa, United States. It spans Minerva Creek for 68 feet (21 m). The Marshall County Board of Supervisors awarded a $14,090 contract to the N.M. Stark and Company of Des Moines to build six concrete bridges. They were all designed by W.W. Morehouse, the Marshall County Engineer. This single-span concrete Luten arch bridge was completed the same year for $2,550. It was the longest of the six bridges in the contract. The bridge was listed on the National Register of Historic Places in 1998.
