= Dunbar, Iowa =

- Unincorporated community
- Location within Iowa Location within the United States
- Coordinates: 41°56′26″N 92°46′53″W
- Country: United States
- State: Iowa
- County: Marshall
- Elevation: 932 ft (284 m)
- Time zone: UTC-6 (Central (CST))
  - Summer (DST): UTC-5 (CDT)
- ZIP code: 50158
- Area code: 641

Dunbar is an unincorporated community and former railroad depot village in Green Castle Township, Marshall County, Iowa, United States.

== History ==
Dunbar was platted in 1882 in Greencastle Township, halfway between LeGrand and Gilman. Many of the settlers were from Norway, and the church established there was associated with the United Norwegian Lutheran Church.

The Dunbar Creamery Company, a co-op, was organized in 1901. A grain company and lumber business followed. The Dunbar Savings Bank was organized in 1909. Dunbar also had a post office and general store in that era.

The Chicago, Milwaukee, St. Paul and Pacific Railroad served Dunbar from 1881 until 1980. Dunbar's population was 44 in 1902, and 55 in 1925.

Dunbar's population in 1940 was 50.
