= Demographics of Iowa =

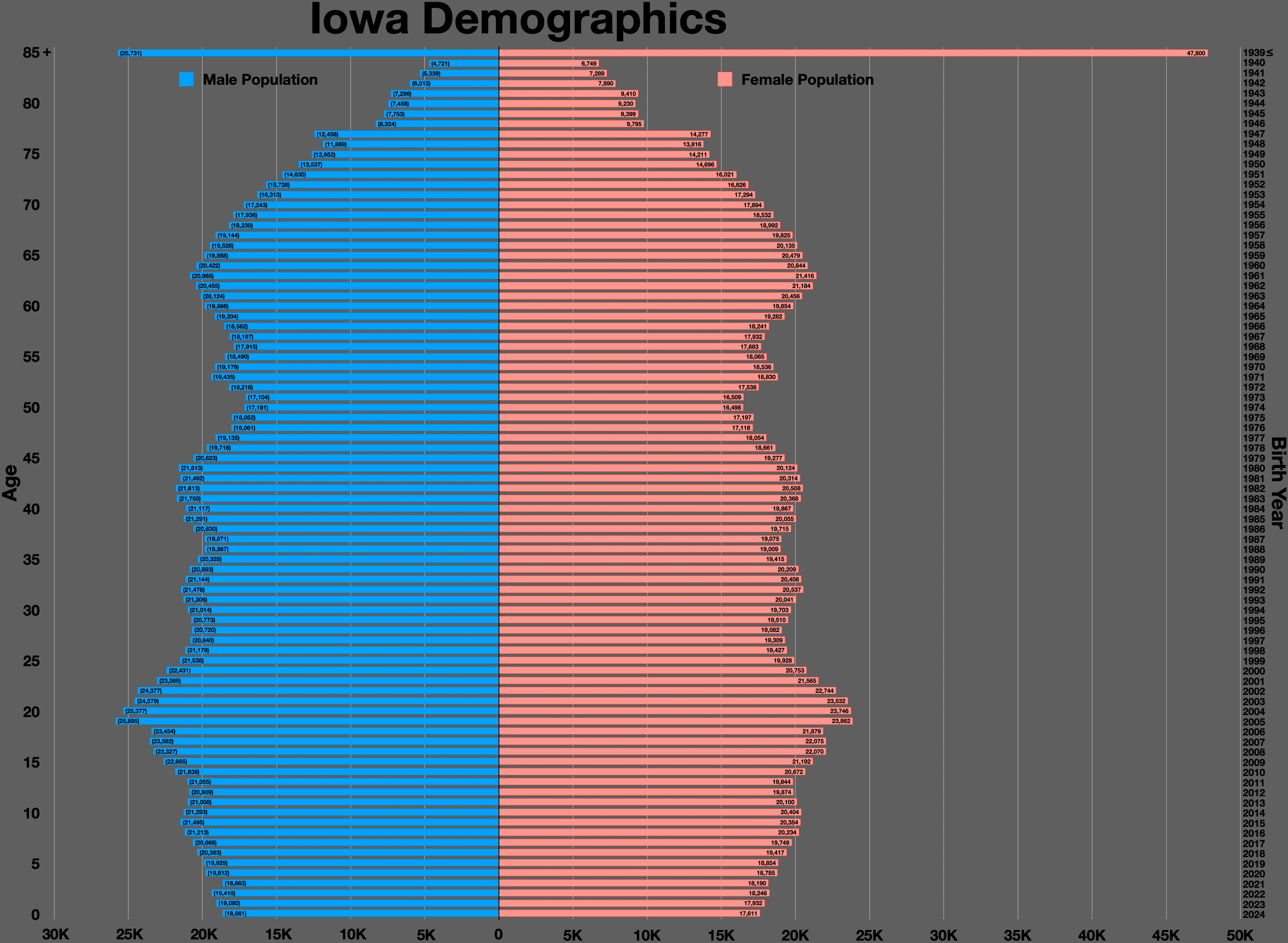
Iowa population pyramid

Historical population
Census	Pop.	Note	%±
1840	43,112		—
1850	192,214		345.8%
1860	674,913		251.1%
1870	1,194,020		76.9%
1880	1,624,615		36.1%
1890	1,912,297		17.7%
1900	2,231,853		16.7%
1910	2,224,771		−0.3%
1920	2,404,021		8.1%
1930	2,470,939		2.8%
1940	2,538,268		2.7%
1950	2,621,073		3.3%
1960	2,757,537		5.2%
1970	2,824,376		2.4%
1980	2,913,808		3.2%
1990	2,776,755		−4.7%
2000	2,926,324		5.4%
2010	3,046,355		4.1%
2020	3,190,369		4.7%
2025 (est.)	3,238,387		1.5%
Source: 1910–2020

The population of Iowa according to the 2020 census was 3,190,369 on April 1, 2020, a 4.73% increase since the 2010 United States census. As of the 2020 census, the center of population of Iowa is near Van Cleve, Marshall County. The population density was 57.1 per square mile. Persons under the age of 5 years are 5.8% of Iowa's population, 22.5% are under 18 and 18.9% are 65 or older. Males make up 50.2% of the population. According to HUD's 2022 Annual Homeless Assessment Report, there were an estimated 2,419 homeless people in Iowa.

== Early settlement ==
The first permanent white settler within the present-day limits of the state of Iowa was fur trader Julien Dubuque, who crossed the Mississippi in 1785 and obtained from the Indians a lease of the lead mines in the vicinity of the present-day city of Dubuque. The mines continued to operate until his death in 1810. The first white settlement was Fort Madison, built in 1808 and abandoned in 1813. In 1829 Isaac Galland established the settlement of Nashville (in what is now Lee County), but it was abandoned before the Black Hawk War. In 1833, after the end of the war, a rush of white settlers into the area began. The initial population in 1833 was estimated as 500 settlers, and a sheriff's census in 1836 showed a population of 10,531. By 1838 it increased to 22,859. The 1840 census showed a population of 43,112 and by 1844 this number increased to 75,152. When Iowa was admitted into the Union, in 1846, the population numbered 102,388 and the 1850 United States census counted 192,214.

== Largest cities ==
The most populous cities in Iowa are as of the 2020 Census:

1. Des Moines: 214,133
2. Cedar Rapids: 137,710
3. Davenport: 101,724
4. Sioux City: 85,797
5. Iowa City: 74,828
6. West Des Moines: 68,723
7. Ankeny: 67,887
8. Waterloo: 67,314
9. Ames: 66,427
10. Council Bluffs: 62,799
11. Dubuque: 59,667

== Immigration ==
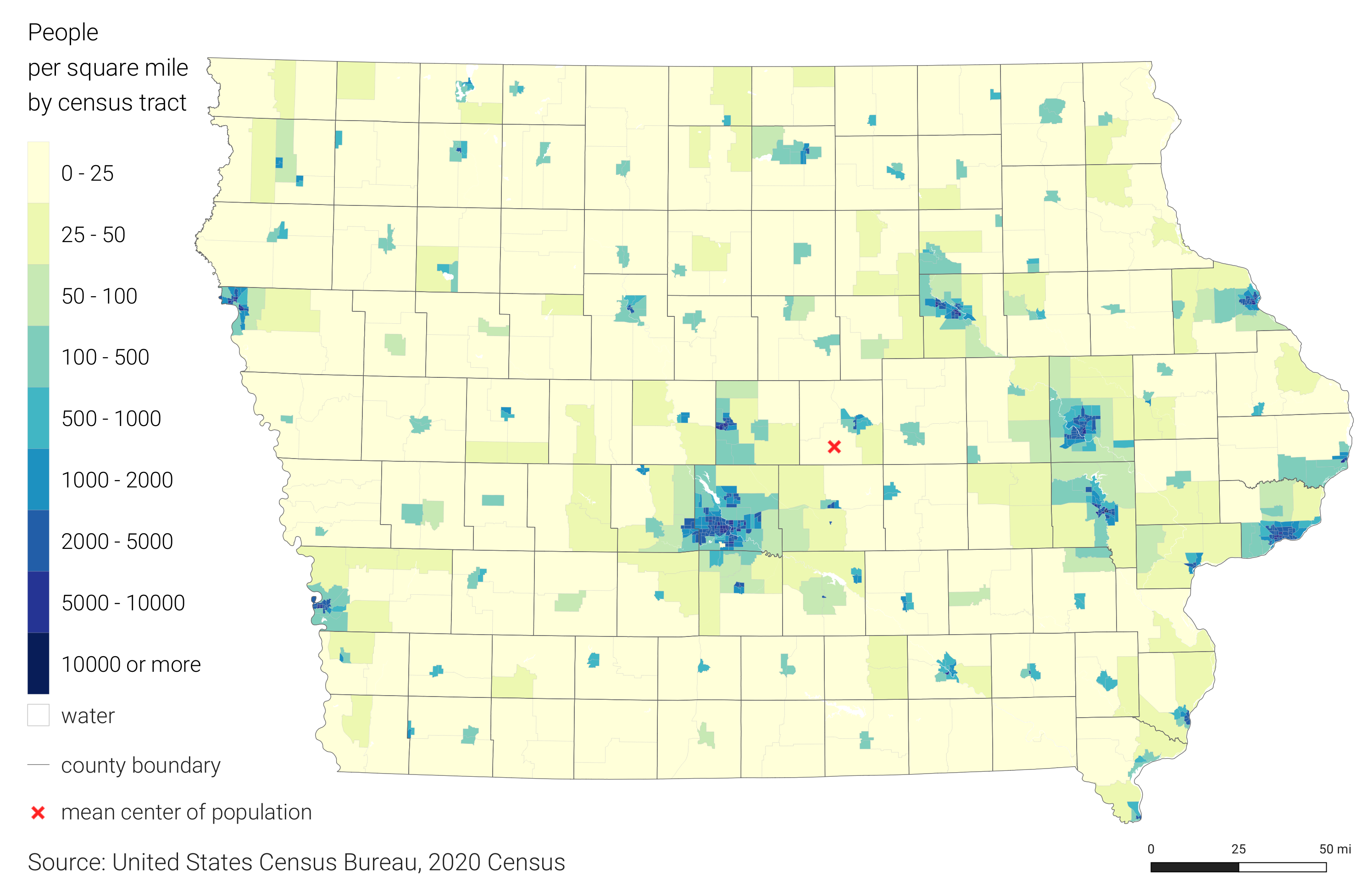
Iowa 2020 Population Density map

Of the residents of Iowa, 70.8% were born in Iowa, 23.6% were born in a different U.S. state, 0.6% were born in Puerto Rico, U.S. Island areas, or born abroad to American parent(s), and 5% were foreign born. In 2018, 175,137 immigrants comprised 6 percent of the state's population. The top countries of origin for Iowa's immigrants in 2018 were Mexico (26 percent of all immigrants), India (6 percent), Vietnam (5 percent), China (4 percent) and Thailand (4 percent). Another 5 percent of the state's population were native-born Americans who had at least one immigrant parent. Immigration from outside the USA resulted in a net increase of 29,386 people, while migration within the country produced a net loss of 41,140 people.

== Languages ==
As of 2000, 94.2% of residents of Iowa spoke only English and 5.8% spoke a language other than English, including Spanish (2.9%), other Indo-European languages (1.8%), Asian and Pacific Island languages (0.9%) and other languages (0.2%). William Labov and colleagues, in the monumental Atlas of North American English, found the English spoken in Iowa divides into multiple linguistic regions. Natives of northern Iowa—including Sioux City, Fort Dodge, and the Waterloo region—tend to speak the dialect linguists call North Central American English, which is also found in North and South Dakota, Minnesota, Wisconsin, and Michigan. Natives of central and southern Iowa—including such cities as Council Bluffs, Davenport, Des Moines, and Iowa City—tend to speak the North Midland dialect also found in eastern Nebraska, central Illinois, and central Indiana. Natives of East-Central Iowa—including cities such as Cedar Rapids, Dubuque, and Clinton tend to speak with the Northern Cities Vowel Shift, a dialect that extends from this area and east across the Great Lakes Region.

== Native Americans ==
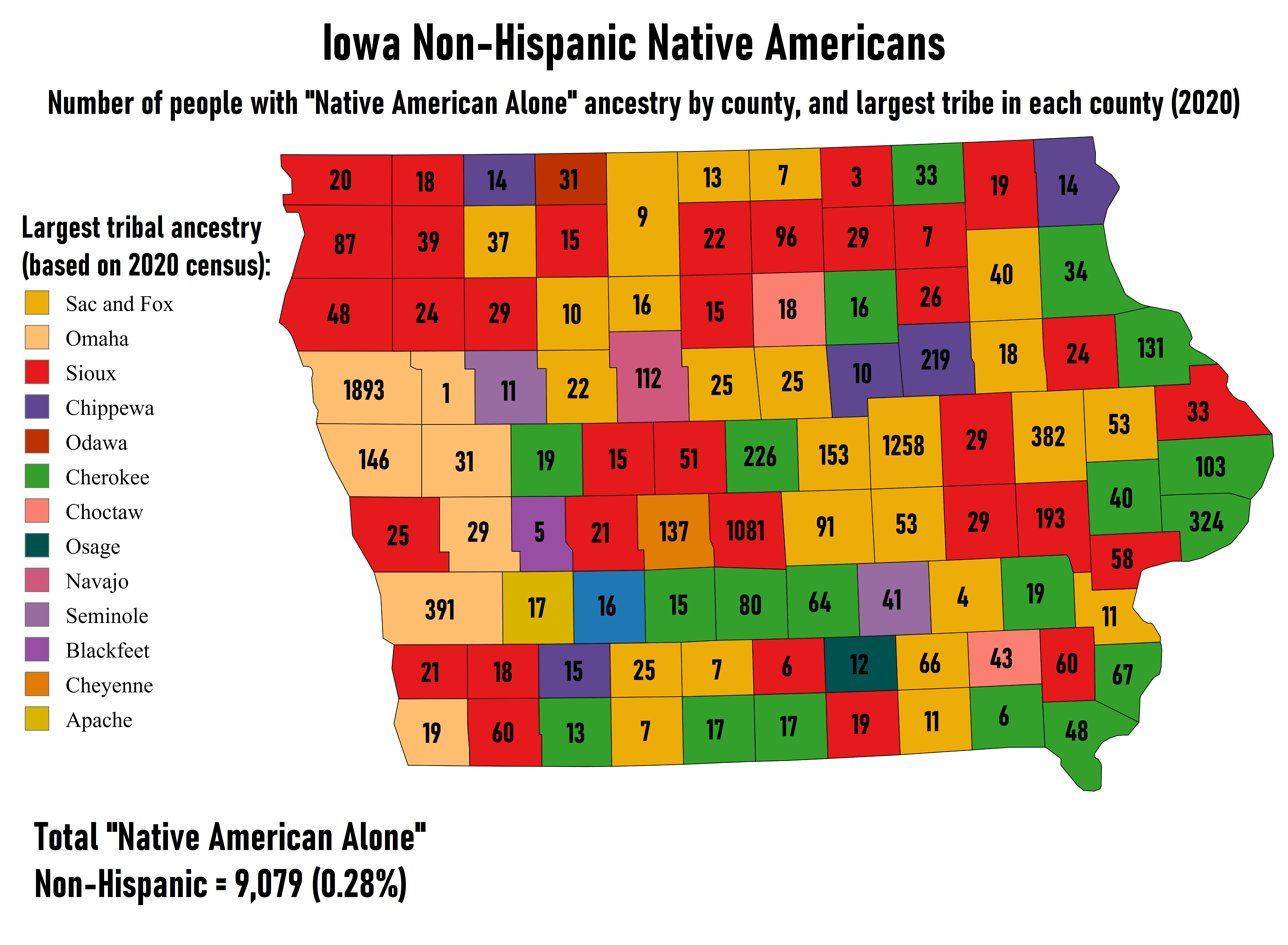
Largest Non-Hispanic Native American ancestry by county and numbers of people reporting "Native American Alone"

The main tribe which inhabited most of what is now Iowa at the time of early European exploration of North America, were the Iowa people. Several other tribes have historically inhabited parts of Iowa at various times, namely the Foxes and the Sauk, the Dakota, the Chippewa, the Illinois (in eastern borderlands of Iowa), the Otoe and Missouria (in southern borderlands of Iowa), the Omaha and Ponca (in western borderlands of Iowa), the Odawa, the Potawatomi and the Ho-Chunk. Today the only federally recognized tribe in Iowa is the Sac and Fox Tribe of the Mississippi in Iowa (also commonly known as the Meskwaki Nation). The Foxes first moved into Iowa after 1804, and by the time of the Black Hawk War all were gathered there. In 1842 they left their Iowa lands and moved to Kansas together with the Sauk. But between 1850 and 1859 some Foxes and Sauk returned from Kansas to Iowa and bought a tract of land near Tama, where they established a settlement and have lived ever since. Apart from the Sac and Fox, there are also many Native American people living in Iowa who identify as Sioux, Ho-Chunk, Omaha, Chippewa, and few more tribes.

In the 2020 United States census, in total 14,486 people in Iowa identified as being Native American alone (including Hispanic Natives), and 41,472 did in combination with one or more other races.

== Race and ethnicity ==
As of the 2020 census White Americans were 84.46% of the population in Iowa (including 82.69% Non-Hispanic Whites). Non-Hispanic Blacks were 4.05% of the population, Asians 2.35%, Native Americans 0.28%, Pacific Islanders 0.18% and people of other races 0.27%. Non-Hispanic people with two or more races were 3.41% (including 1.11% people with partially Native American ancestry) and Hispanics, of any race, were 6.77%.

The largest White American ethnic group in Iowa is German (17.1% of all Whites), followed by English as the second most numerous ethnicity (10.3% of all Whites). Another very common White ethnicity in Iowa is Irish. The largest Hispanic ethnicity is Mexican, followed by Guatemalan. The largest Black ethnicity is African-American, followed by Congolese. And the largest Asian ethnicity is Indian, followed by Vietnamese.

Iowa – Racial and ethnic composition Note: the US Census treats Hispanic/Latino as an ethnic category. This table excludes Latinos from the racial categories and assigns them to a separate category. Hispanics/Latinos may be of any race.
Race / Ethnicity (NH = Non-Hispanic)	Pop 2000	Pop 2010	Pop 2020	% 2000	% 2010	% 2020
White alone (NH)	2,710,344	2,701,123	2,638,201	92.62%	88.67%	82.69%
Black or African American alone (NH)	60,744	86,906	129,321	2.08%	2.85%	4.05%
Native American or Alaska Native alone (NH)	7,955	8,581	9,079	0.27%	0.28%	0.28%
Asian alone (NH)	36,345	52,597	75,017	1.24%	1.73%	2.35%
Pacific Islander alone (NH)	888	1,797	5,605	0.03%	0.06%	0.18%
Other race alone (NH)	2,103	2,132	8,487	0.07%	0.07%	0.27%
Mixed race or Multiracial (NH)	25,472	41,675	108,673	0.87%	1.37%	3.41%
Hispanic or Latino (any race)	82,473	151,544	215,986	2.82%	4.97%	6.77%
Total	2,926,324	3,046,355	3,190,369	100.00%	100.00%	100.00%

=== Ancestry ===
The top fifteen largest European ancestries in Iowa according to 2024 American Community Survey were:

- German (946,883)
- Irish (420,012)
- English (322,361)
- Norwegian (132,407)
- Dutch (98,695)
- Swedish (69,603)
- Italian (65,874)
- Scottish (58,654)
- French (50,345)
- Danish (46,577)
- Czech (45,583)
- Polish (34,070)
- Scotch-Irish (21,693)
- Welsh (16,514)
- Swiss (14,087)

== Religion ==
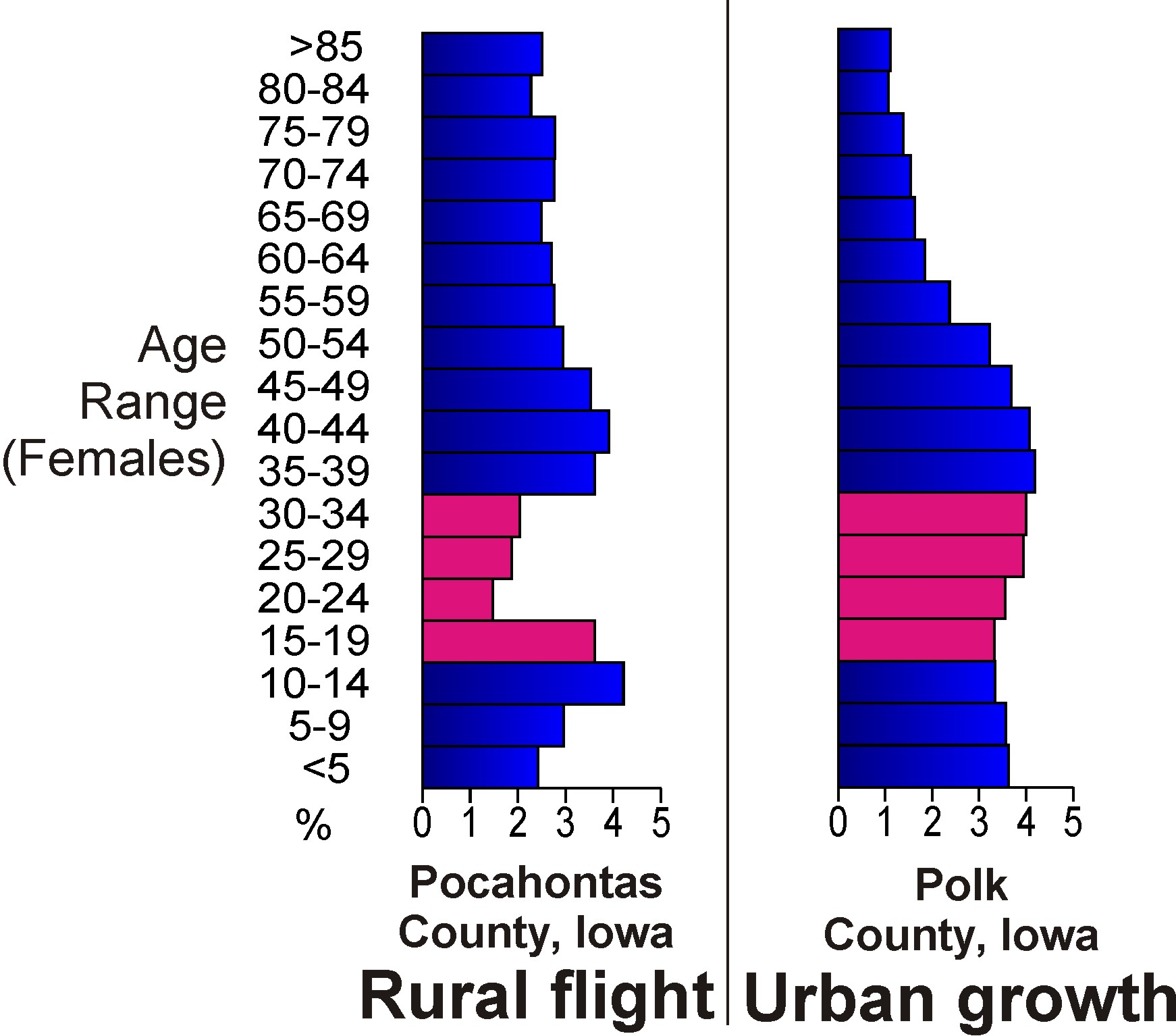
Population age comparison between rural Pocahontas County and urban Polk County, illustrating the flight of young adults (red) to urban centers in Iowa

As of 2024 religious denominations in Iowa included: Protestants (52%), Catholics (23%), Latter-day Saints (1%), Muslims (1%), other religions (3%), religiously unaffiliated (18%), people who did not answer (2%). A survey from the Association of Religion Data Archives (ARDA) in 2010 found that the largest Protestant denominations were the United Methodist Church with 235,190 adherents and the Evangelical Lutheran Church in America with 229,557. The largest non-Protestant religion was Catholicism with 503,080 adherents. The state has a great number of Calvinist denominations. The Presbyterian Church (USA) had almost 290 congregations and 51,380 members followed by the Reformed Church in America with 80 churches and 40,000 members, and the United Church of Christ had 180 churches and 39,000 members. According to the 2020 Public Religion Research Institute's study, 26% of the population were irreligious.

The study Religious Congregations & Membership: 2000 found that in the southernmost two tiers of Iowa counties and in other counties in the center of the state, the largest religious group was the United Methodist Church; in the northeast part of the state, including Dubuque and Linn counties (where Cedar Rapids is located), the Catholic Church was the largest; and in ten counties, including three in the northern tier, the Evangelical Lutheran Church in America was the largest. The study also found rapid growth in Evangelical Christian denominations. Dubuque is home to the Archdiocese of Dubuque, which serves as the ecclesiastical province for all three other dioceses in the state and for all the Catholics in Iowa.

Historically, religious sects and orders who desired to live apart from the rest of society established themselves in Iowa; for example, the Amish and Mennonites have communities near Kalona and in other parts of eastern Iowa such as Davis County and Buchanan County. Other religious sects and orders living apart include Quakers around West Branch and Le Grand, German Pietists who founded the Amana Colonies, followers of Transcendental Meditation who founded Maharishi Vedic City, and Order of Cistercians of the Strict Observance monks and nuns at the New Melleray and Our Lady of the Mississippi Abbeys near Dubuque.

By 1878, approximately 1000 Jews, many of whom were immigrants from Poland and Germany, lived in Iowa. As of 2016, about 6,000 Jews lived in Iowa, with about 3,000 in Des Moines alone.

== LGBTQ population ==
The United States Census Bureau does not measure sexual orientation but plans are in place to start measuring it starting in 2027 with the American Community Survey. According to analysis of Gallup data by The Williams Institute, around 3.6% of adults (age 18+) in Iowa are LGBTQ, and around 27% of Iowa's LGBTQ adults over the age of 25 are raising children.

== Vital statistics ==
Note: Births in table don't add up, because Hispanics are counted both by their ethnicity and by their race, giving a higher overall number.

Live births by single race/ethnicity of mother
Race	2014	2015	2016	2017	2018	2019	2020	2021	2022	2023	2024
White	32,423 (81.7%)	32,028 (81.1%)	31,376 (79.6%)	30,010 (78.1%)	29,327 (77.6%)	29,050 (77.2%)	27,542 (76.3%)	28,167 (76.5%)	27,527 (75.4%)	26,961 (74.8%)	26,771 (73.5%)
Black	2,467 (6.2%)	2,597 (6.6%)	2,467 (6.3%)	2,657 (6.9%)	2,615 (6.9%)	2,827 (7.5%)	2,685 (7.4%)	2,567 (7.0%)	2,562 (7.0%)	2,613 (7.2%)	2,707 (7.4%)
Asian	1,408 (3.5%)	1,364 (3.4%)	1,270 (3.2%)	1,321 (3.4%)	1,176 (3.1%)	1,106 (2.9%)	1,067 (2.9%)	1,055 (2.9%)	1,032 (2.8%)	956 (2.7%)	986 (2.7%)
Pacific Islander	...	...	...	...	...	...	...	...	323 (0.9%)	420 (1.2%)	386 (1.0%)
Native American	284 (0.7%)	242 (0.6%)	147 (0.4%)	311 (0.8%)	152 (0.4%)	308 (0.8%)	143 (0.4%)	129 (0.3%)	136 (0.4%)	142 (0.4%)	135 (0.4%)
Hispanic (any race)	3,315 (8.3%)	3,418 (8.6%)	3,473 (8.8%)	3,527 (9.2%)	3,694 (9.8%)	3,695 (9.8%)	3,725 (10.3%)	3,903 (10.6%)	4,172 (11.4%)	4,211 (11.7%)	4,667 (12.8%)
Total	39,687 (100%)	39,482 (100%)	39,403 (100%)	38,430 (100%)	37,785 (100%)	37,649 (100%)	36,114 (100%)	36,835 (100%)	36,506 (100%)	36,052 (100%)	36,436 (%)

- Since 2016, data for births of White Hispanic origin are not collected, but included in one Hispanic group; persons of Hispanic origin may be of any race.

== Economics ==
In 2020-2024 the median household income in Iowa was $75,059 (in 2024 dollars) and the per capita income was $40,877. The unemployment rate as of January 2026 was 3.4%.
