= Le Grand Bridge =

Le Grand Bridge may refer to:

- Le Grand Bridge (1896), Le Grand, Iowa, listed on the NRHP in both Marshall and Tama counties
- Le Grand Bridge (1914), Le Grand, Iowa, listed on the NRHP in Marshall County
