= Marshall High School =

Marshall High School and variants may refer to:

- Marshall High School (Arkansas), Marshall, Arkansas
- Marshall High School (Illinois), Marshall, Illinois
- East Marshall Senior High School, Le Grand, Iowa
- West Marshall High School, State Center, Iowa
- Marshall County High School (Kentucky), Draffenville, Kentucky
- Marshall High School (Michigan), Marshall, Michigan
- Marshall County Central High School, Newfolden, Minnesota
- Marshall High School (Minnesota), Marshall, Minnesota
- Marshall School, Duluth, Minnesota
- S.V. Marshall High School, Holmes County, Mississippi
- Marshall Senior High School (Missouri), Marshall, Missouri
- Marshall High School (Marshall, North Carolina), listed on the NRHP in North Carolina
- Marshall High School (Bend, Oregon), Bend, Oregon
- Marshall High School (Portland, Oregon). Portland, Oregon
- Marshall County High School (Tennessee), Lewisburg, Tennessee
- Marshall High School (Texas), Marshall, Texas
- George C. Marshall High School, Idylwood, Virginia
- Marshall High School (Wisconsin), Marshall, Dane County, Wisconsin

== John Marshall High School ==
- John Marshall High School (Los Angeles), California
- John Marshall Metropolitan High School, Chicago, Illinois
- John Marshall Community High School (Indiana), Indianapolis, Indiana
- John Marshall High School (Minnesota), Rochester, Minnesota
- John Marshall High School (New York), Rochester, New York
- John Marshall High School (Ohio), Cleveland, Ohio
- John Marshall High School (Oklahoma), Oklahoma City, Oklahoma
- John Marshall High School (Leon Valley, Texas)
- John Marshall High School (Richmond, Virginia)
- John Marshall High School (West Virginia), Glen Dale, West Virginia
- John Marshall High School (Wisconsin), Milwaukee, Wisconsin

== See also ==
- Thurgood Marshall High School (disambiguation)
