= Minerva Township, Marshall County, Iowa =

Township in Marshall County, Iowa, U.S.

Coordinates: 42.078°N 93.174°W

Minerva Township is a township in Iowa's Marshall County, near the geographic center of the state.

== History ==
Minerva Township was first settled in 1851 and formally established in 1866, and in its early days, a protestant church was noted to be located in the town. The township was named for two creeks, the Little and Big Minerva creeks.

== Geography ==
Minerva is located in Iowa's rural regions. Marshall County Highway S62, locally known as Hopkins Avenue, acts as the main road through most of central Minerva Township. The town is located directly to the south of Bangor and to the east of Clemons, equidistantly 4.5 miles away from both.

Minerva is approximately 10 miles away from Marshalltown, the closest settlement with over 25,000 people. It's also about 40 miles away from Des Moines, which is the location of the closest airport with regularly-scheduled commercial service.

== Demographics ==
In the 2020 United States census, Minerva Township was counted as having 456 people, with 439 identifying as only white, one as Native American, one as Asian American, one as Native Hawaiian, five as a member of some other race, and nine as descending from two or more races. The census also showed the median income in the township being $49,700 USD/year per household. According to Niche, the median home value in Minerva Township is $59,500 USD, nearly $170,000 below Niche's national average.

=== Political affiliation ===
Minerva Township is a mostly conservative community and generally votes for the Republican Party. In the 2020 United States presidential election, at least 65% of residents votes for GOP incumbent Donald Trump over Democratic nominee Joe Biden, though the township supported Biden generally more than they did 2016 Democratic presidential nominee Hillary Clinton.
