= Bromley, Iowa =

- Unincorporated community
- Location within Iowa Location within the United States
- Coordinates: 42°07′8″N 93°07′47″W
- Country: United States
- State: Iowa
- County: Marshall
- Elevation: 935 ft (285 m)
- Time zone: UTC-6 (Central (CST))
  - Summer (DST): UTC-5 (CDT)
- Area code: 641
- GNIS feature ID: 464470

Bromley is an unincorporated community and former village in Minerva Township, Marshall County, Iowa, United States.

== History ==
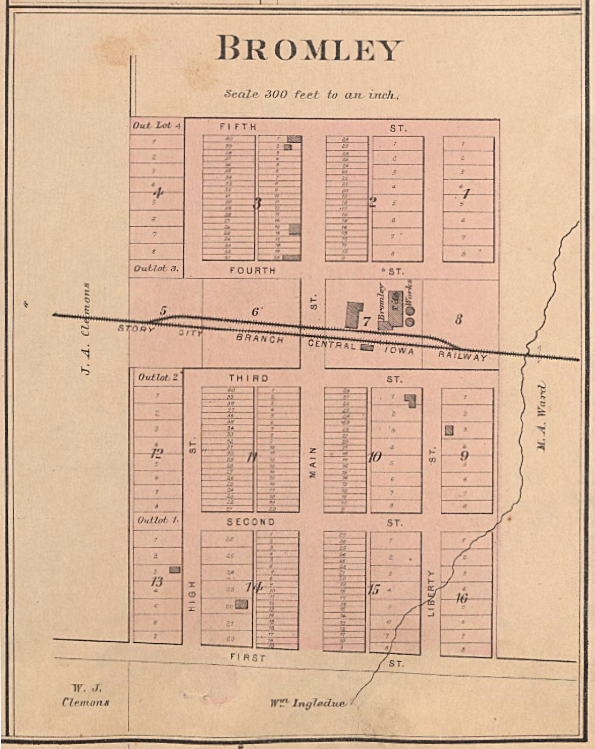
Town plat of Bromley, Iowa, in 1885

Bromley was platted by Charles Bromley in September 1881.

The community was built adjacent to the Story City Branch of the Central Iowa Railway. The town plat was divided into sixteen blocks, with three north-south streets (High, Main, and Liberty streets) and five east-west streets (first through fifth streets). A railroad depot was built at the center of the community, with the Central Iowa Railroad bisecting the community. Bromley was located between Minerva and Clemmons (Clemmons Grove).

Bromley's population was estimated at 100 in 1890, 150 in 1900, and 150 in 1925.

Despite the community's location on a major rail line and the presence of a brick and tile factory in the community, Bromley did not stay prosperous after its early years. By 1940, Bromley's population had declined to just 4 residents.

Early 20th Century historians suspected Bromley's failure to prosper might have been its location: just two miles west of Minerva and one mile east of Clemmons. According to historian William Battin (1912), "the town failed to grow."

Today, Bromley is the site of Bromley Pond, just east of Clemmons.
