= Greencastle Township =

Greencastle Township may refer to:

- Greencastle Township, Putnam County, Indiana
- Greencastle Township, Marshall County, Iowa
