= Minerva Creek =

Stream in Hardin and Marshall County, Iowa, U.S.

Coordinates: 42°07′13″N 93°01′59″W

Minerva Creek is a stream in Hardin and Marshall counties, Iowa, United States. It is a tributary to the Iowa River.

Minerva Creek was named after Minerva, the Roman goddess of crafts and wisdom.

Over the creek spans the Minerva Creek Bridge, which is listed on the National Register of Historic Places. Minerva Creek is located in central Iowa and flows for approximately 16 miles before joining the Iowa River. The creek passes through rural farmland and wooded areas, providing habitat for a variety of wildlife, including fish, birds, and mammals.

The name Minerva Creek has its roots in ancient mythology. Minerva was a goddess in Roman mythology associated with wisdom, crafts, and strategic warfare. The name was likely chosen by early settlers in the area who were familiar with classical literature and mythology.

The Minerva Creek Bridge is an important landmark in the area. The bridge was built in 1884 and is a rare example of a bowstring arch truss bridge. It was added to the National Register of Historic Places in 1998 and has since been restored and preserved as a historic site. The bridge is a popular destination for tourists and locals alike, who come to admire its unique design and learn about its history.

Overall, Minerva Creek and its surroundings offer a glimpse into Iowa's natural and cultural heritage, providing visitors with opportunities for outdoor recreation, education, and exploration.
