= JMH =

JMH may refer to:

== Hospitals ==
- Jackson Memorial Hospital, associated with the University of Miami school of medicine

== Publications ==
- Journal of Mental Health, published bimonthly in the United Kingdom
- The Journal of Military History, published quarterly by the Society for Military History
- Journal of Mississippi History, published quarterly by the Mississippi Historical Society
- Journal of Modern History, published by the University of Chicago Press
- Journal of Mormon History, published quarterly by the Mormon History Association

== Schools ==
- James Madison High School (disambiguation)
- James Meehan High School, in New South Wales, Australia
- John Maland High School, in Devon, Alberta, Canada
- John Marshall High School (disambiguation)
- Jordan-Matthews High School, in Siler City, North Carolina

== Science ==
- John-Milton-Hagen blood group antigen, protein fixed to cell membrane by GPI linkage
- Java Microbenchmark Harness, a Java harness for building, running, and analysing nano/micro/milli/macro benchmarks written in Java and other languages targeting the JVM.
