= Le Grand Bridge (1896) =

- U.S. National Register of Historic Places
- Location within Iowa Location within the United States
- Location: Abbot Ave. over the Iowa River
- Nearest city: Le Grand, Iowa
- Coordinates: 42°1′54″N 92°45′58″W
- Area: less than one acre
- Built: 1896; 130 years ago
- Architects: Marshalltown Bridge and Iron Works
- Architectural style: pinned Pratt through truss
- MPS: Highway Bridges of Iowa MPS
- NRHP reference No.: 98000481
- Added to NRHP: May 15, 1998

The Le Grand Bridge was a bridge north of Le Grand, Iowa, United States. It spanned the Iowa River for 242 feet (74 m), carrying traffic on a gravel road named Abbot Avenue. Since Abbott Avenue is the border between Marshall and Tama counties, the bridge is in two counties lengthwise. Many bridges span from one county to another, but few are lengthwise split. It necessitated a joint session of the two counties' Boards of Supervisors on June 29, 1896, to approve the project. The pinned Pratt through truss bridge was built in 1896 by the Marshalltown Bridge and Iron Works for $3,548. It was listed on the National Register of Historic Places in 1998. The bridge collapsed in the Iowa flood of 2008.

== See also ==
- Le Grand Bridge (1914), over the same Iowa River backwater, wholly in Marshall County
