= Van Cleve, Iowa =

- Unincorporated community
- Location within Iowa Location within the United States
- Coordinates: 41°55′53″N 93°01′09″W
- Country: United States
- State: Iowa
- County: Marshall
- Elevation: 1,050 ft (320 m)
- Time zone: UTC-6 (Central (CST))
  - Summer (DST): UTC-5 (CDT)
- GNIS feature ID: 462530

Van Cleve (or Vancleve) is an unincorporated community in Marshall County, in the U.S. state of Iowa.

== Geography ==
Van Cleve is located at 41°55′53″N 93°01′09″W.

== History ==
Van Cleve was platted in section 11 of Weston Township in November 1880 by Weston T. Plumb, adjacent to the Iowa Central Railroad.

Van Cleve's post office opened in 1881.

The population of Van Cleve was 107 in 1902. In 1912, Van Cleve was the site of a school house, the post office, lumber yard, and a Congregational church.

Van Cleve's population was 77 in 1925. Van Cleve County Park is adjacent to Van Cleve.

Van Cleve's post office closed in 1939. The population in 1940 was 70.

The U.S. Bureau of the Census declared that the 2020 geographic center of Iowa's population was in Van Cleve.

== See also ==
LaMoille, Iowa
