= Marshall Township, Marshall County, Iowa =

Township in Marshall County, Iowa, U.S.

Coordinates: 42.048°N 92.910°W

Marshall Township is a township in Marshall County, Iowa, USA.

== History ==
Marshall Township was established in 1855.
