= Marietta Township, Marshall County, Iowa =

Township in Marshall County, Iowa, U.S.

Coordinates: 42.078°N 93.059°W

Marietta Township is a township in Marshall County, Iowa, USA.

== History ==
Marietta Township was established in 1852.
