= Ferguson, Iowa =

- City
- Location of Ferguson, Iowa
- Coordinates: 41°56′19″N 92°51′46″W
- Country: United States
- State: Iowa
- County: Marshall

Area
  - Total: 0.25 sq mi (0.66 km^{2})
  - Land: 0.25 sq mi (0.66 km^{2})
  - Water: 0 sq mi (0.00 km^{2})
- Elevation: 915 ft (279 m)

Population (2020)
  - Total: 97
  - Density: 379.0/sq mi (146.32/km^{2})
- Time zone: UTC-6 (Central (CST))
  - Summer (DST): UTC-5 (CDT)
- ZIP code: 50078
- Area code: 641
- FIPS code: 19-27255
- GNIS feature ID: 2394759

Ferguson is a city in Marshall County, Iowa, United States. The population was 97 at the time of the 2020 census.

== History ==
Ferguson was founded in 1882.

== Geography ==
Ferguson is located at 41°56′15″N 92°51′54″W (41.937460, -92.865004).

According to the United States Census Bureau, the city has a total area of 0.26 square miles (0.67 km^{2}), all land.

== Demographics ==
Historical populations
Year	Pop.	±%
1910	127	—
1920	207	+63.0%
1930	175	−15.5%
1940	183	+4.6%
1950	178	−2.7%
1960	186	+4.5%
1970	203	+9.1%
1980	173	−14.8%
1990	166	−4.0%
2000	126	−24.1%
2010	126	+0.0%
2020	97	−23.0%
Source:"U.S. Census website". United States Census Bureau. and Iowa Data Center; Source: U.S. Decennial Census

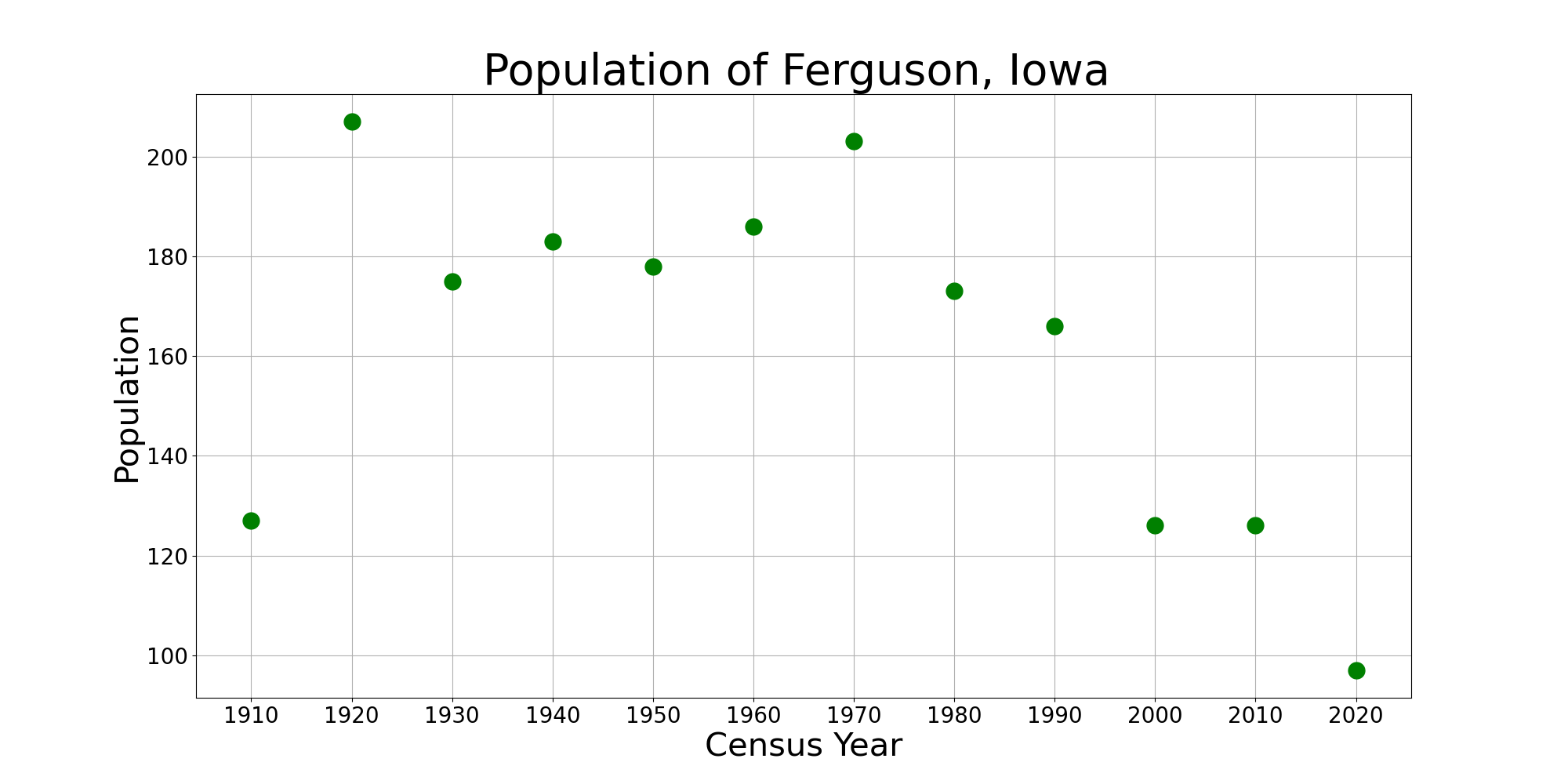
The population of Ferguson, Iowa from US census data

=== 2020 census ===
As of the census of 2020, there were 97 people, 42 households, and 32 families residing in the city. The population density was 379.0 inhabitants per square mile (146.3/km^{2}). There were 51 housing units at an average density of 199.2 per square mile (76.9/km^{2}). The racial makeup of the city was 88.7% White, 0.0% Black or African American, 1.0% Native American, 0.0% Asian, 0.0% Pacific Islander, 0.0% from other races and 10.3% from two or more races. Hispanic or Latino persons of any race comprised 6.2% of the population.

Of the 42 households, 16.7% of which had children under the age of 18 living with them, 54.8% were married couples living together, 4.8% were cohabitating couples, 16.7% had a female householder with no spouse or partner present and 23.8% had a male householder with no spouse or partner present. 23.8% of all households were non-families. 16.7% of all households were made up of individuals, 7.1% had someone living alone who was 65 years old or older.

The median age in the city was 54.5 years. 17.5% of the residents were under the age of 20; 4.1% were between the ages of 20 and 24; 16.5% were from 25 and 44; 36.1% were from 45 and 64; and 25.8% were 65 years of age or older. The gender makeup of the city was 52.6% male and 47.4% female.

=== 2010 census ===
As of the census of 2010, there were 126 people, 55 households, and 38 families living in the city. The population density was 484.6 inhabitants per square mile (187.1/km^{2}). There were 59 housing units at an average density of 226.9 per square mile (87.6/km^{2}). The racial makeup of the city was 98.4% White and 1.6% from two or more races.

There were 55 households, of which 21.8% had children under the age of 18 living with them, 41.8% were married couples living together, 16.4% had a female householder with no husband present, 10.9% had a male householder with no wife present, and 30.9% were non-families. 20.0% of all households were made up of individuals, and 10.9% had someone living alone who was 65 years of age or older. The average household size was 2.29 and the average family size was 2.61.

The median age in the city was 51 years. 19% of residents were under the age of 18; 5.7% were between the ages of 18 and 24; 16% were from 25 to 44; 44.4% were from 45 to 64; and 15.1% were 65 years of age or older. The gender makeup of the city was 46.0% male and 54.0% female.

=== 2000 census ===
As of the census of 2000, there were 126 people, 55 households, and 36 families living in the city. The population density was 505.7 inhabitants per square mile (195.3/km^{2}). There were 56 housing units at an average density of 224.8 per square mile (86.8/km^{2}). The racial makeup of the city was 96.83% White and 3.17% Native American. Hispanic or Latino of any race were 0.79% of the population.

There were 55 households, out of which 21.8% had children under the age of 18 living with them, 43.6% were married couples living together, 16.4% had a female householder with no husband present, and 34.5% were non-families. 29.1% of all households were made up of individuals, and 10.9% had someone living alone who was 65 years of age or older. The average household size was 2.29 and the average family size was 2.83.

In the city, the population was spread out, with 23.8% under the age of 18, 4.8% from 18 to 24, 21.4% from 25 to 44, 34.9% from 45 to 64, and 15.1% who were 65 years of age or older. The median age was 44 years. For every 100 females, there were 100.0 males. For every 100 females age 18 and over, there were 95.9 males.

The median income for a household in the city was $40,893, and the median income for a family was $46,250. Males had a median income of $42,083 versus $22,250 for females. The per capita income for the city was $22,777. There were 4.4% of families and 4.3% of the population living below the poverty line, including 15.4% of under eighteens and none of those over 64.

== Education ==
East Marshall Community School District serves the community. The district was established on July 1, 1992 by the merger of the LDF and SEMCO school districts.
