= Liscomb Township, Marshall County, Iowa =

Township in Marshall County, Iowa, U.S.

Coordinates: 42.166°N 92.943°W

Liscomb Township is a township in Marshall County, Iowa, USA.

== History ==
Liscomb Township was established in 1869.
