= Quarry, Iowa =

- Unincorporated community
- Location within Iowa Location within the United States
- Coordinates: 42°01′5″N 92°48′22″W
- Country: United States
- State: Iowa
- County: Marshall
- Established: 1868
- Elevation: 892 ft (272 m)
- Time zone: UTC-6 (Central (CST))
  - Summer (DST): UTC-5 (CDT)
- ZIP code: 50158
- Area code: 641

Quarry is a rural unincorporated community in Marshall County, Iowa, United States.

== History ==
The town of Quarry was established in 1868 by George F. Kirby and Isaac B. Howe, the owners of the Le Grand Quarry Company, located a mile or so NW of the town of LeGrand. The Chicago & NorthWestern Railway had recently passed through connecting Marshalltown with Chicago in 1863. Howe was the Supt. of the Iowa Division of that railroad, and Kirby was his assistant in 1866 when they first began organizing their quarry company. First they needed a rail station for shipping their product, which was conveniently accomplished considering their positions with the railroad. Since Railroad stations brought immediate prosperity to an area, by 1868 the firm of Kirby&Howe had a village laid out with housing for their workers. There were a hotel, markets, a post office and a saloon and a school the following year. During its heyday, between 60 and 150 laborers worked in the Quarry quarries. The post office remained in operation until it was discontinued in 1909.

While the primary product of the new town was the excellent quality marble of the quarries, they also produced limestone blocks for construction of many notable buildings, a great quantity of ballasting for the railroad. Later the quarries became famous in paleontology when it was discovered that the LeGrand stone contained a significant amount of fossilized crinoids.

Quarry's population in 1940 was 144.
