= Bill Crews (politician) =

American politician

Mayor of Melbourne, Iowa
- In office 1984–1998

Personal details
- Born: July 12, 1952 (age 74)

Bill Crews (born July 12, 1952) is an American politician who served as the mayor of Melbourne, Iowa, from 1984 through 1998. Crews came out at the LGBT Equality March on Washington, D.C., in 1993, where he attracted national attention as a result of hate graffiti on his Melbourne house.

== Political career ==
Crews was an attorney working in the office of the Iowa state governor when he was approached to run for mayor, having moved to Melbourne just three months earlier. At the elections held the following year, Crews won all 57 votes cast. He was re-elected in the 1987, 1991, and 1995 elections.

During Crews' service as mayor of Melbourne, the city built a new fire station and library, improved water and sewer infrastructure and increased cash reserves.

Formerly a moderate Republican, he claimed "I was a Republican from before the fundamentalists took over the Iowa party. I believe in progressive, fiscally responsible government. I am now a registered Democrat. I'm pro-choice; I've always been."

Crews ran for the Iowa Senate in 1992 but lost by just 57 votes. After moving to the District of Columbia, Crews served two terms as an elected Advisory Neighborhood Commissioner (SMD 6C07) in the neighborhood of Capitol Hill. Crews also served as the Zoning Administrator for the District of Columbia from 2005 through 2007. Crews was once again elected as an Advisory Neighborhood Commissioner in 2010.

== Personal life ==
Crews' father, a United Methodist minister who fought for social justice, was killed in a car accident in 1973. Bill Crews was also active in the United Methodist church after coming out, until 1998 when he relocated to Washington, D.C., with his husband.
