= Washington Township, Marshall County, Iowa =

Township in Marshall County, Iowa, U.S.

Coordinates: 41.992°N 93.058°W

Washington Township is a township in Marshall County, Iowa, United States.

== History ==
Washington Township was created in 1859.
