= Le Grand Township, Marshall County, Iowa =

Township in Marshall County, Iowa, U.S.

Coordinates: 41.992°N 92.825°W

Le Grand Township is a township in Marshall County, Iowa, United States.

== History ==
Le Grand Township was established in 1855.
