= Timber Creek Township, Marshall County, Iowa =

Township in Marshall County, Iowa, U.S.

Coordinates: 41.992°N 92.942°W

Timber Creek Township is a township in Marshall County, Iowa, USA.

== History ==
Timber Creek Township was created in 1861.
