= Jefferson Township, Marshall County, Iowa =

Township in Marshall County, Iowa, U.S.

Coordinates: 41.906°N 92.941°W

Jefferson Township is a township in Marshall County, Iowa, USA.

== History ==
Jefferson Township was established in 1855.
