= Bangor Township, Marshall County, Iowa =

Township in Marshall County, Iowa, U.S.

Coordinates: 42.1657°N 93.0594°W

Bangor Township is a township in Marshall County, Iowa, United States.

== History ==
Bangor Township was established in 1855.
