= Laurel, Iowa =

- City
- Location of Laurel, Iowa
- Coordinates: 41°53′02″N 92°55′20″W
- Country: United States
- State: Iowa
- County: Marshall

Area
  - Total: 0.25 sq mi (0.64 km^{2})
  - Land: 0.25 sq mi (0.64 km^{2})
  - Water: 0 sq mi (0.00 km^{2})
- Elevation: 1,040 ft (320 m)

Population (2020)
  - Total: 220
  - Density: 892.7/sq mi (344.66/km^{2})
- Time zone: UTC-6 (Central (CST))
  - Summer (DST): UTC-5 (CDT)
- ZIP code: 50141
- Area code: 641
- FIPS code: 19-43680
- GNIS feature ID: 2395643

Laurel is a city in Marshall County, Iowa, United States. The population was 220 at the time of the 2020 census.

== History ==
Laurel was platted in 1880 by Conrad Weissenburger, and it was incorporated in 1902. The city was named after Laurel, Ohio, by settler Rufus Archerd.

== Geography ==
According to the United States Census Bureau, the city has a total area of 0.25 square miles (0.65 km^{2}), all land.

== Education ==
East Marshall Community School District serves the community. The district was established on July 1, 1992 by the merger of the LDF and SEMCO school districts.

== Notable people ==
- Gertrude Baniszewski, convicted murderer of Sylvia Likens; lived as a recluse after her release and died of lung cancer
- Esther Dendel (1910–2002), non-fiction writer

== Demographics ==
Historical populations
Year	Pop.	±%
1910	179	—
1920	195	+8.9%
1930	232	+19.0%
1940	232	+0.0%
1950	257	+10.8%
1960	223	−13.2%
1970	245	+9.9%
1980	278	+13.5%
1990	271	−2.5%
2000	266	−1.8%
2010	239	−10.2%
2020	220	−7.9%
Source:"U.S. Census website". United States Census Bureau. and Iowa Data Center; Source: U.S. Decennial Census

=== 2020 census ===
As of the census of 2020, there were 220 people, 102 households, and 70 families residing in the city. The population density was 892.7 inhabitants per square mile (344.7/km^{2}). There were 114 housing units at an average density of 462.6 per square mile (178.6/km^{2}). The racial makeup of the city was 96.4% White, 0.0% Black or African American, 0.0% Native American, 1.4% Asian, 0.0% Pacific Islander, 0.0% from other races and 2.3% from two or more races. Hispanic or Latino persons of any race comprised 0.5% of the population.

Of the 102 households, 27.5% of which had children under the age of 18 living with them, 51.0% were married couples living together, 3.9% were cohabitating couples, 27.5% had a female householder with no spouse or partner present and 17.6% had a male householder with no spouse or partner present. 31.4% of all households were non-families. 21.6% of all households were made up of individuals, 7.8% had someone living alone who was 65 years old or older.

The median age in the city was 50.3 years. 21.8% of the residents were under the age of 20; 3.2% were between the ages of 20 and 24; 18.6% were from 25 and 44; 32.3% were from 45 and 64; and 24.1% were 65 years of age or older. The gender makeup of the city was 54.1% male and 45.9% female.

=== 2010 census ===
As of the census of 2010, there were 239 people, 109 households, and 64 families living in the city. The population density was 956.0 inhabitants per square mile (369.1/km^{2}). There were 122 housing units at an average density of 488.0 per square mile (188.4/km^{2}). The racial makeup of the city was 98.7% White, 0.4% African American, 0.4% Asian, and 0.4% from two or more races. Hispanic or Latino of any race were 2.1% of the population.

There were 109 households, of which 29.4% had children under the age of 18 living with them, 37.6% were married couples living together, 14.7% had a female householder with no husband present, 6.4% had a male householder with no wife present, and 41.3% were non-families. 38.5% of all households were made up of individuals, and 19.3% had someone living alone who was 65 years of age or older. The average household size was 2.19 and the average family size was 2.89.

The median age in the city was 43.8 years. 25.5% of residents were under the age of 18; 5.4% were between the ages of 18 and 24; 20.9% were from 25 to 44; 30.1% were from 45 to 64; and 18% were 65 years of age or older. The gender makeup of the city was 49.8% male and 50.2% female.

=== 2000 census ===
As of the census of 2000, there were 266 people, 109 households, and 70 families living in the city. The population density was 1,056.7 inhabitants per square mile (408.0/km^{2}). There were 122 housing units at an average density of 484.7 per square mile (187.1/km^{2}). The racial makeup of the city was 96.24% White, 0.38% Native American, 1.13% Pacific Islander, and 2.26% from two or more races. Hispanic or Latino of any race were 2.63% of the population.

There were 109 households, out of which 26.6% had children under the age of 18 living with them, 54.1% were married couples living together, 7.3% had a female householder with no husband present, and 34.9% were non-families. 32.1% of all households were made up of individuals, and 20.2% had someone living alone who was 65 years of age or older. The average household size was 2.44 and the average family size was 3.00.

In the city, the population was spread out, with 26.3% under the age of 18, 4.9% from 18 to 24, 25.9% from 25 to 44, 25.9% from 45 to 64, and 16.9% who were 65 years of age or older. The median age was 40 years. For every 100 females, there were 97.0 males. For every 100 females age 18 and over, there were 96.0 males.

The median income for a household in the city was $32,031, and the median income for a family was $38,125. Males had a median income of $30,208 versus $17,188 for females. The per capita income for the city was $14,980. About 1.4% of families and 7.0% of the population were below the poverty line, including 9.2% of those under the age of eighteen and 12.2% of those 65 or over.
