= Esther Dendel =

American author and craftswoman (1910–2002)

Esther Sietmann Warner Dendel (1910–2002) was an American author and craftswoman who published several books on craftsmanship and Liberian traditions. She was the cofounder of Denwar Ceramics and was awarded the Annual Author Award by the Irvine Library in 1968.

== Early life and education ==
On February 2, 1910, Dendel was born to Lewis and Grace Sietmann on a farm outside of Laurel, Iowa. At age 11, she became a member of her local 4-H club and was named Iowa State 4-H President at the age of 17. In 1927, Dendel graduated from high school as the valedictorian of her class and began attending Iowa State College, though she left school after two years to work as a Home demonstration agent of the Extension Department of West Virginia Agricultural College.

Eventually, Dendel resumed her education, earning a degree from the Home economics Department of Iowa State College in 1938. Upon her graduation, she was awarded a Lydia Roberts Fellowship, which allowed her to continue her studies at Columbia University in New York City, where she earned a master's degree in art, with an emphasis in sculpture.

== Career ==
=== Life in Liberia ===
Warner Dendel married botanist Robert Warner on December 9, 1939. The couple, who had met at Iowa State College, moved to Liberia after Robert was appointed Research Director for the Firestone Tire and Rubber Company. While in Liberia, Dendel made two trips across the country, travelling on foot through the rainforest and staying in villages where she learned about traditional Liberian customs, folklore and art forms. She reportedly funded these trips by capturing and training baby chimpanzees and selling them to a farm in Florida.

=== Return to the United States ===
In 1943, Dendel and her husband returned to the United States, where she began teaching art at the University of Minnesota at St. Paul. The couple divorced soon after moving back to the U.S.

In 1945, Dendel moved to Costa Mesa, California, where she founded Denwar Ceramics alongside Jo Dendel, whom she had met in Liberia. The couple, who were married in 1950, created and sold unique dishes and pottery. During the 1960s, the Dendels began hosting weekly instructional pottery workshops. Their work has been displayed in both the Museum of Modern Art and the Bowers Museum.

=== Death ===
Esther Dendel died of old age in 2002 at the age of 92. She is buried in Laurel, Iowa.

== Literary works ==
Throughout her career, Dendel wrote several instructional books on crafts, as well as books on African myths and art forms inspired by her time living in Liberia.

Dendel's memoir New Song in a Strange Land (1948) was a narrative of her life in Africa and was illustrated by Jo Dendel.

=== Bibliography ===
==== Books about craftsmanship ====
- The Basic Book of Fingerweaving (1950)
- African Fabric Crafts: Sources of African Design and Technique (1974)
- The Basic Book of Twining (1978)
- Designing from Nature: A Source Book for Artists and Other Craftsmen (1978)
- You Cannot Unsneeze a Sneeze and Other Tales from Liberia (1995)

==== Memoirs ====
- New Song in a Strange Land (1948)
- Seven Days to Lomaland (1954)

==== Novels ====
- The Silk Cotton Tree (1958)
