= Le Grand Bridge (1914) =

- U.S. National Register of Historic Places
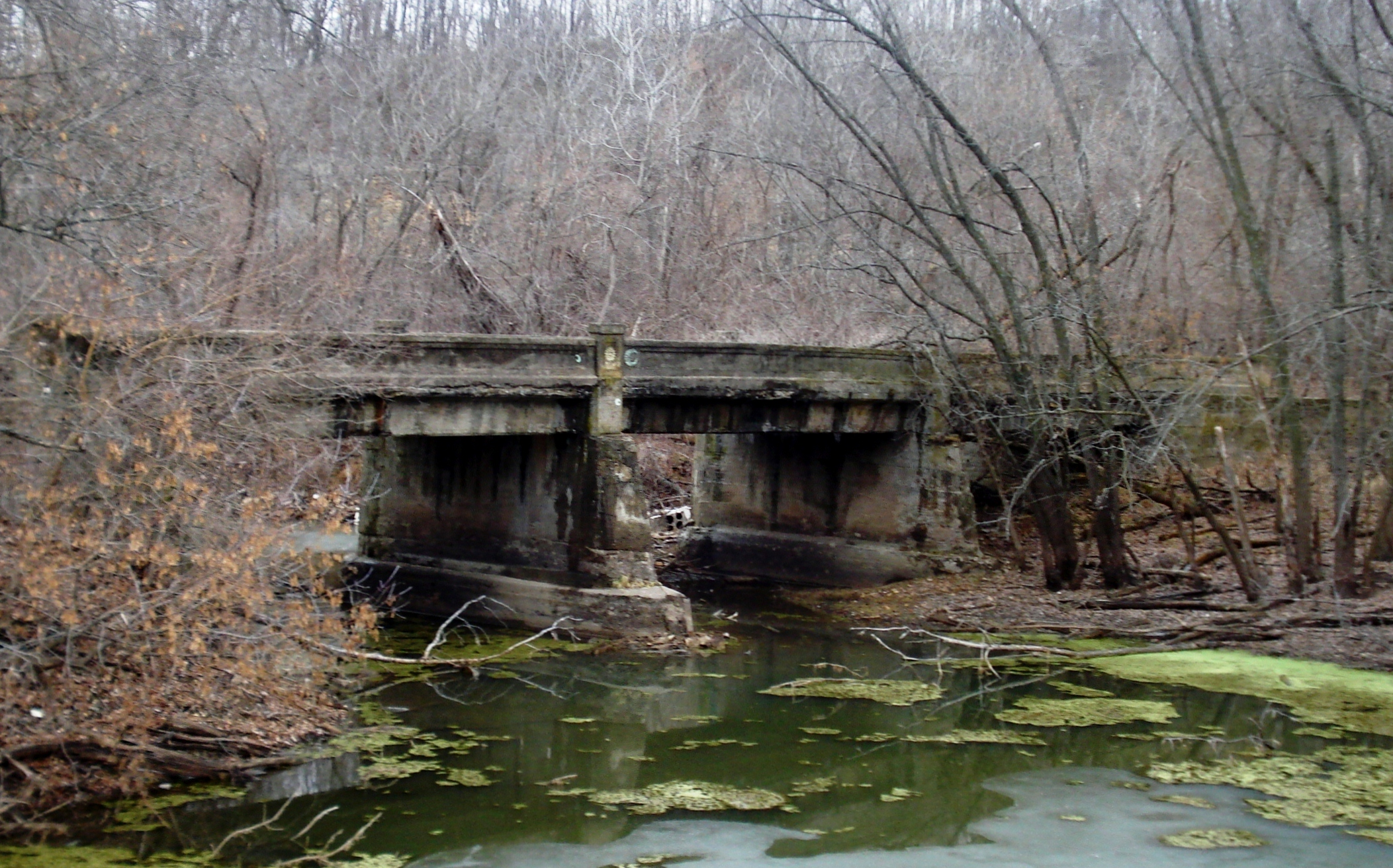

- Location within Iowa Location within the United States
- Nearest city: Le Grand, Iowa
- Coordinates: 42°1′47″N 92°46′59″W
- Area: less than one acre
- Built: 1914
- Architect: Marshall City Engineer, IA State Hwy; Capital City Construction
- Architectural style: concrete deck girder
- MPS: Highway Bridges of Iowa MPS
- NRHP reference No.: 98000499
- Added to NRHP: May 15, 1998

The Le Grand Bridge is an abandoned concrete girder bridge built in 1914–1915. It is an early example of concrete-girder work by the Iowa State Highway Commission.

== History ==
The LeGrand Bridge carried traffic over the Iowa River for more than fifty years. The bridge is a multiple-span reinforced concrete girder construction. This type of bridge construction was typical in Marshall County, Iowa since the Brockway Act of 1913. Marshall county supervisors contracted with Des Moines-based Capital City Construction Company to build the bridge, which was completed early in 1915. The county later rechanneled the river and rerouted the road. The LeGrand Bridge now stands abandoned over a backwater of the river.

== See also ==
- Le Grand Bridge (1896)
