= State Center Township, Marshall County, Iowa =

Township in Marshall County, Iowa, U.S.

Coordinates: 41.992°N 93.174°W

State Center Township is a township in Marshall County, Iowa, USA.

== History ==
State Center Township was created in 1866.
