= Bangor, Iowa =

- Unincorporated community
- Location within Iowa Location within the United States
- Coordinates: 42°10′24″N 93°05′37″W
- Country: United States
- State: Iowa
- County: Marshall County
- Time zone: UTC-6 (Central (CST))
  - Summer (DST): UTC-5 (CDT)
- US: 50051

Bangor is an unincorporated community in Marshall County, Iowa, United States. It is located at the intersections of County Highway E18 and S62, five miles southwest of Liscomb and six miles south of Union. It is located near the west bank of the Iowa River, at 42.172838N, -93.089073W.

== History ==
Bangor was founded by Abijah Hodgins in August 1854; it was a Quaker settlement, and according to one historian, the town "played a role in the Underground Railroad".

Bangor's population was 52 in 1902, and 40 in 1925. The population was 70 in 1940.
