= Eden Township, Marshall County, Iowa =

Township in Marshall County, Iowa, U.S.

Coordinates: 41.9039°N 93.1828°W

Eden Township is a township in Marshall County, Iowa, USA.

== History ==
Eden Township was established in 1855.
