= Iowa Township, Marshall County, Iowa =

Coordinates: 42.121°N 92.993°W

Iowa Township is a township in Marshall County, Iowa, USA. In 2021, its population was estimated to be 40,137.

== History ==
Iowa Township was established in 1855.
