= Marion Township, Marshall County, Iowa =

Township in Marshall County, Iowa, U.S.

Coordinates: 42.0844°N 92.8311°W

Marion Township is a township in Marshall County, Iowa, USA.

== History ==
Marion Township was established in 1854.
