= East Marshall Community School District =

Public school district in Gilman, Iowa, United States

Location
- Gilman, Iowa Marshall County, Tama, Jasper, and Poweshiek counties United States
- Coordinates: 41.880370°N 92.790508°W

District information
- Type: Local school district
- Grades: K-12
- Established: 1992
- Superintendent: Kevin Seeney
- Schools: 3
- Budget: $13,097,000 (2020-21)
- NCES District ID: 1900040

Students and staff
- Students: 713 (2022-23)
- Teachers: 43.33 FTE
- Staff: 51.46 FTE
- Student–teacher ratio: 16.46
- Athletic conference: North Iowa Cedar League
- District mascot: Mustangs
- Colors: Purple and Gold

Other information
- Website: www.emmustangs.org

East Marshall Community School District is a rural public school district headquartered in Gilman, Iowa. It operates an elementary school in Laurel, a middle school in Gilman, and a high school in Le Grand.

The district is mostly in Marshall County with portions in Tama, Jasper, and Poweshiek counties. The district includes Gilman, Laurel, Le Grand, Ferguson and a small portion of Marshalltown.

The district was established on July 1, 1992, by the merger of the LDF and SEMCO school districts.

The school's mascot is the Mustang. Their colors are purple and gold.

== Schools ==
- East Marshall Elementary School
- East Marshall Middle School
- East Marshall Senior High School

=== East Marshall Senior High School ===
==== Athletics ====
The Mustangs compete in the North Iowa Cedar League Conference in the following sports:

- Cross Country
  - Boys' 2014 Class 2A State Champions
- Volleyball
- Football
- Basketball
- Wrestling
- Track and Field
- Golf
- Baseball
- Softball
- Soccer

== See also ==
- List of school districts in Iowa
- List of high schools in Iowa
