= Vienna Township, Marshall County, Iowa =

Township in Marshall County, Iowa

Coordinates: 42.167°N 92.826°W

Vienna Township is a township in Marshall County, Iowa, USA.

== History ==
Vienna Township was established in 1855.
