= Logan Township, Marshall County, Iowa =

Township in Marshall County, Iowa, U.S.

Coordinates: 41.906°N 93.058°W

Logan Township is a township in Marshall County, Iowa, USA.

== History ==
Logan Township was created in 1869.
