= Gilman, Iowa =

- City
- Location of Gilman, Iowa
- Coordinates: 41°52′35″N 92°47′18″W
- Country: United States
- State: Iowa
- County: Marshall

Area
  - Total: 0.54 sq mi (1.39 km^{2})
  - Land: 0.54 sq mi (1.39 km^{2})
  - Water: 0 sq mi (0.00 km^{2})
- Elevation: 1,030 ft (310 m)

Population (2020)
  - Total: 542
  - Density: 1,011.8/sq mi (390.67/km^{2})
- Time zone: UTC-6 (Central (CST))
  - Summer (DST): UTC-5 (CDT)
- ZIP code: 50106
- Area code: 641
- FIPS code: 19-30900
- GNIS feature ID: 2394900
- Website: https://gilman.ia.gov/

Gilman is a city in the southeastern corner of Marshall County, Iowa, United States. The population was 542 at the time of the 2020 census.

== History ==
Gilman got its start in the year 1870, following construction of the Central Railroad of Iowa through the territory. The town is named for Charles Gilman, a railroad contractor. Gilman was incorporated in 1876. Gilman celebrates No-Rivers Day at the Gilman No-Rivers Festival. The annual festival is orchestrated by the Gilman Events committee.

== Geography ==
According to the United States Census Bureau, the city has a total area of 0.54 square miles (1.40 km^{2}), all land.

== Demographics ==
Historical populations
Year	Pop.	±%
1880	553	—
1890	473	−14.5%
1900	465	−1.7%
1910	430	−7.5%
1920	490	+14.0%
1930	428	−12.7%
1940	483	+12.9%
1950	508	+5.2%
1960	491	−3.3%
1970	513	+4.5%
1980	642	+25.1%
1990	586	−8.7%
2000	600	+2.4%
2010	509	−15.2%
2020	542	+6.5%
Source:"U.S. Census website". United States Census Bureau. and Iowa Data Center; Source: U.S. Decennial Census

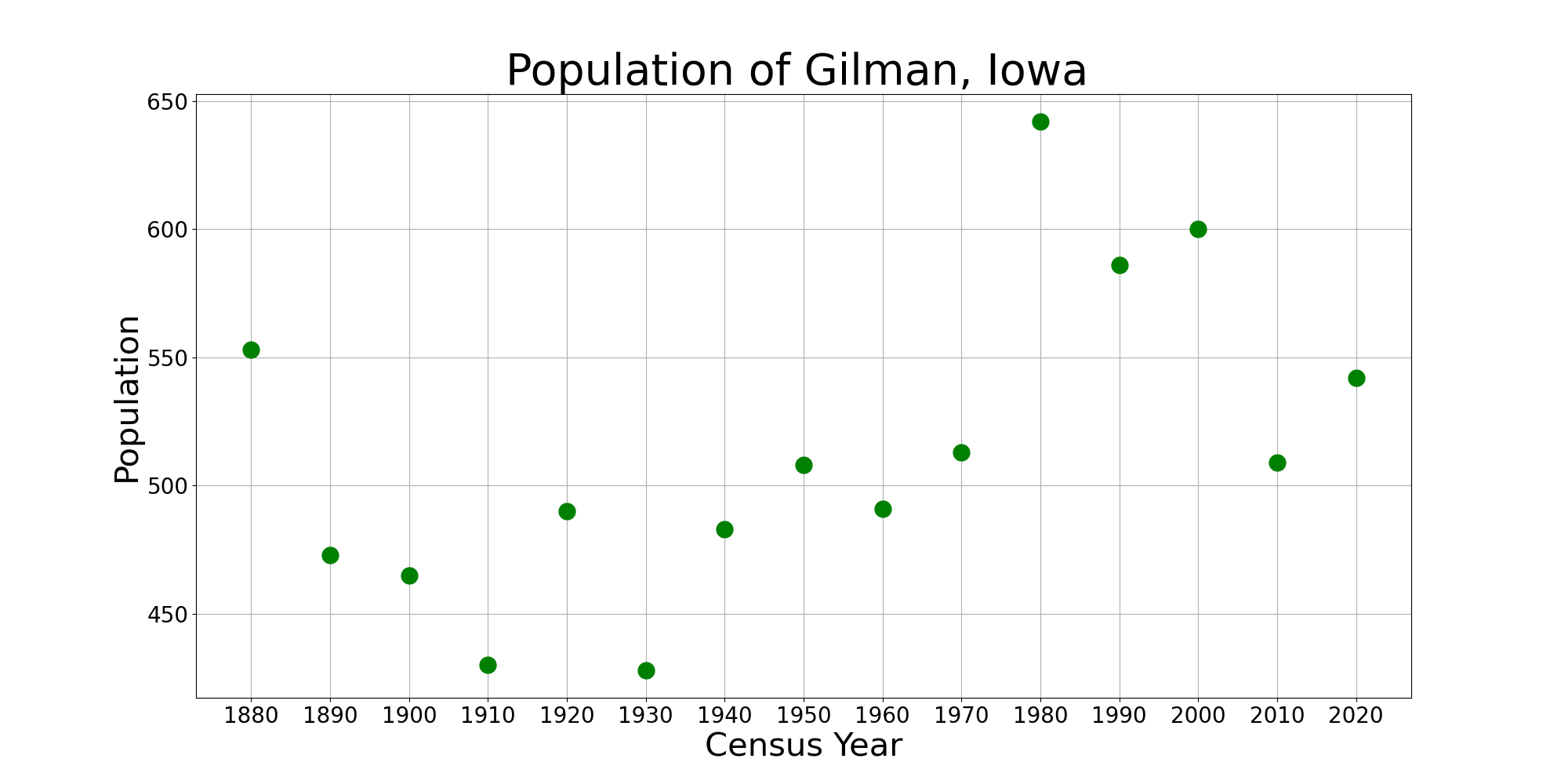
The population of Gilman, Iowa from US census data

=== 2020 census ===
As of the census of 2020, there were 542 people, 220 households, and 130 families residing in the city. The population density was 1,011.8 inhabitants per square mile (390.7/km^{2}). There were 241 housing units at an average density of 449.9 per square mile (173.7/km^{2}). The racial makeup of the city was 94.5% White, 0.4% Black or African American, 0.4% Native American, 0.4% Asian, 0.0% Pacific Islander, 0.6% from other races and 3.9% from two or more races. Hispanic or Latino persons of any race comprised 2.6% of the population.

Of the 220 households, 28.6% of which had children under the age of 18 living with them, 44.5% were married couples living together, 14.5% were cohabitating couples, 23.6% had a female householder with no spouse or partner present and 17.3% had a male householder with no spouse or partner present. 40.9% of all households were non-families. 33.2% of all households were made up of individuals, 12.3% had someone living alone who was 65 years old or older.

The median age in the city was 37.1 years. 30.3% of the residents were under the age of 20; 3.1% were between the ages of 20 and 24; 25.8% were from 25 and 44; 23.4% were from 45 and 64; and 17.3% were 65 years of age or older. The gender makeup of the city was 49.6% male and 50.4% female.

=== 2010 census ===
At the 2010 census there were 509 people in 233 households, including 142 families, in the city. The population density was 942.6 inhabitants per square mile (363.9/km^{2}). There were 253 housing units at an average density of 468.5 per square mile (180.9/km^{2}). The racial makup of the city was 99.6% White, 0.2% from other races, and 0.2% from two or more races. Hispanic or Latino of any race were 0.8%.

Of the 233 households 28.8% had children under the age of 18 living with them, 48.1% were married couples living together, 11.6% had a female householder with no husband present, 1.3% had a male householder with no wife present, and 39.1% were non-families. 34.8% of households were one person and 15% were one person aged 65 or older. The average household size was 2.18 and the average family size was 2.83.

The median age was 42.6 years. 23.6% of residents were under the age of 18; 5.3% were between the ages of 18 and 24; 24.2% were from 25 to 44; 30.1% were from 45 to 64; and 16.9% were 65 or older. The gender makeup of the city was 48.7% male and 51.3% female.

=== 2000 census ===
At the 2000 census there were 600 people in 248 households, including 162 families, in the city. The population density was 1,099.0 inhabitants per square mile (424.3/km^{2}). There were 259 housing units at an average density of 474.4 per square mile (183.2/km^{2}). The racial makup of the city was 99.50% White, and 0.50% from two or more races. Hispanic or Latino of any race were 0.33%.

Of the 248 households 32.7% had children under the age of 18 living with them, 53.2% were married couples living together, 10.1% had a female householder with no husband present, and 34.3% were non-families. 29.4% of households were one person and 14.5% were one person aged 65 or older. The average household size was 2.42 and the average family size was 2.98.

27.5% were under the age of 18, 5.3% from 18 to 24, 27.0% from 25 to 44, 23.3% from 45 to 64, and 16.8% were 65 or older. The median age was 39 years. For every 100 females, there were 92.9 males. For every 100 females age 18 and over, there were 82.8 males.

The median household income was $33,523 and the median family income was $42,500. Males had a median income of $35,000 versus $20,250 for females. The per capita income for the city was $15,070. About 9.9% of families and 12.7% of the population were below the poverty line, including 18.9% of those under age 18 and 8.9% of those age 65 or over.

== Education ==
East Marshall Community School District serves the community. The district was established on July 1, 1992, by the merger of the LDF and SEMCO school districts.

== See also ==
- List of cities in Iowa
