= Melbourne, Iowa =

- City
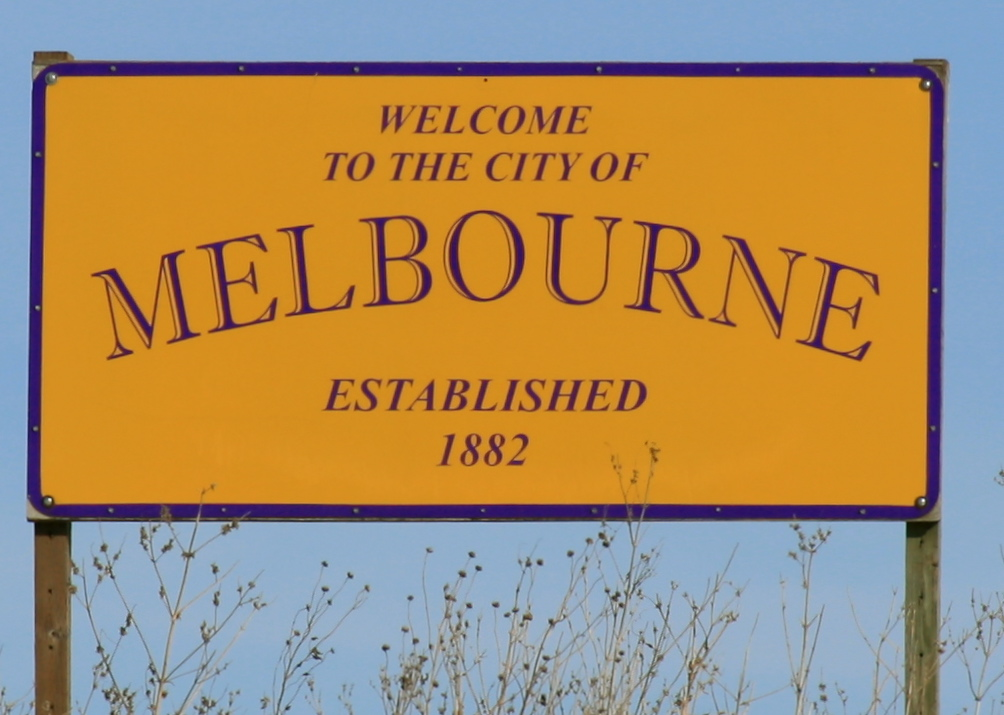
- Sign for Melbourne, Iowa along Highway 330

- Location of Melbourne, Iowa
- Coordinates: 41°56′30″N 93°06′08″W
- Country: United States
- State: Iowa
- County: Marshall
- Established: 1882

Area
  - Total: 0.53 sq mi (1.37 km^{2})
  - Land: 0.53 sq mi (1.37 km^{2})
  - Water: 0 sq mi (0.00 km^{2})
- Elevation: 1,040 ft (320 m)

Population (2020)
  - Total: 786
  - Density: 1,489/sq mi (574.8/km^{2})
- Time zone: UTC-6 (Central (CST))
  - Summer (DST): UTC-5 (CDT)
- ZIP code: 50162
- Area code: 641
- FIPS code: 19-50880
- GNIS feature ID: 2395086
- Website: www.melbourneiowa.com

Melbourne is a city in Marshall County, Iowa, United States. The population was 786 at the time of the 2020 census.

== History ==
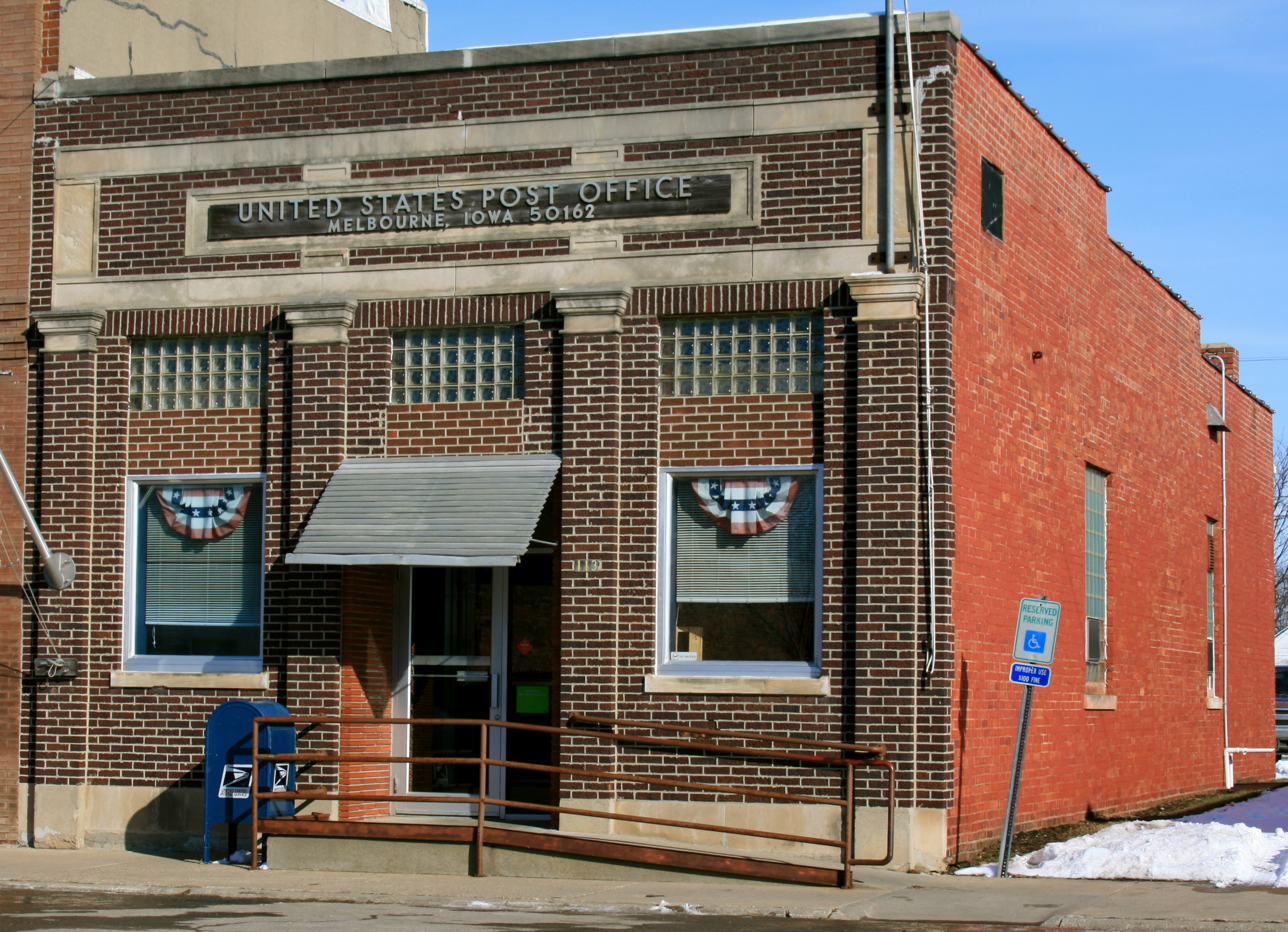
Melbourne Post Office

The town of Melbourne was platted February 23, 1882, by Milwaukee Land Company, in section 6 of Logan Township and was incorporated December 30, 1895. Melbourne was the only town in Marshall County to be served continuously by two major railroads. Melbourne's growth was rapid and made possible by three railroads and the population increased to 423 by 1910. Melbourne suffered the worst disaster in the town's history when a fire consumed the whole business district in 1903; then in 1981 the southern end of town was destroyed by a tornado.

The mayor of Melbourne from 1984 until 1998 was Bill Crews, an openly gay man who revealed his orientation during his term, in 1993. At the time, Melbourne was believed to be the smallest municipality in the United States to have an openly gay mayor.

== Demographics ==
Historical populations
Year	Pop.	±%
1900	366	—
1910	423	+15.6%
1920	481	+13.7%
1930	426	−11.4%
1940	480	+12.7%
1950	510	+6.2%
1960	517	+1.4%
1970	661	+27.9%
1980	732	+10.7%
1990	669	−8.6%
2000	794	+18.7%
2010	830	+4.5%
2020	786	−5.3%
Source:"U.S. Census website". United States Census Bureau. and Iowa Data Center; Source: U.S. Decennial Census

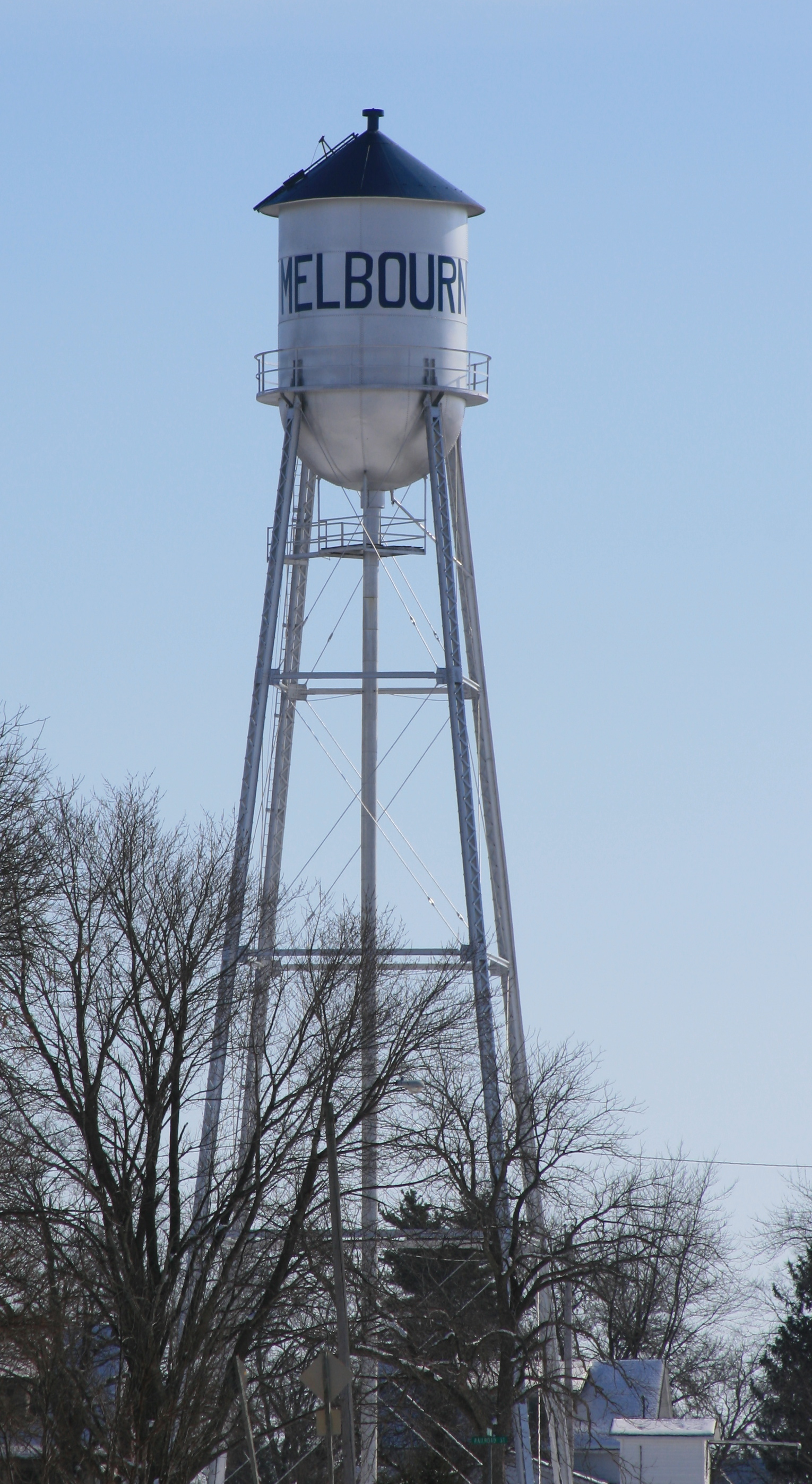
Water tower in Melbourne

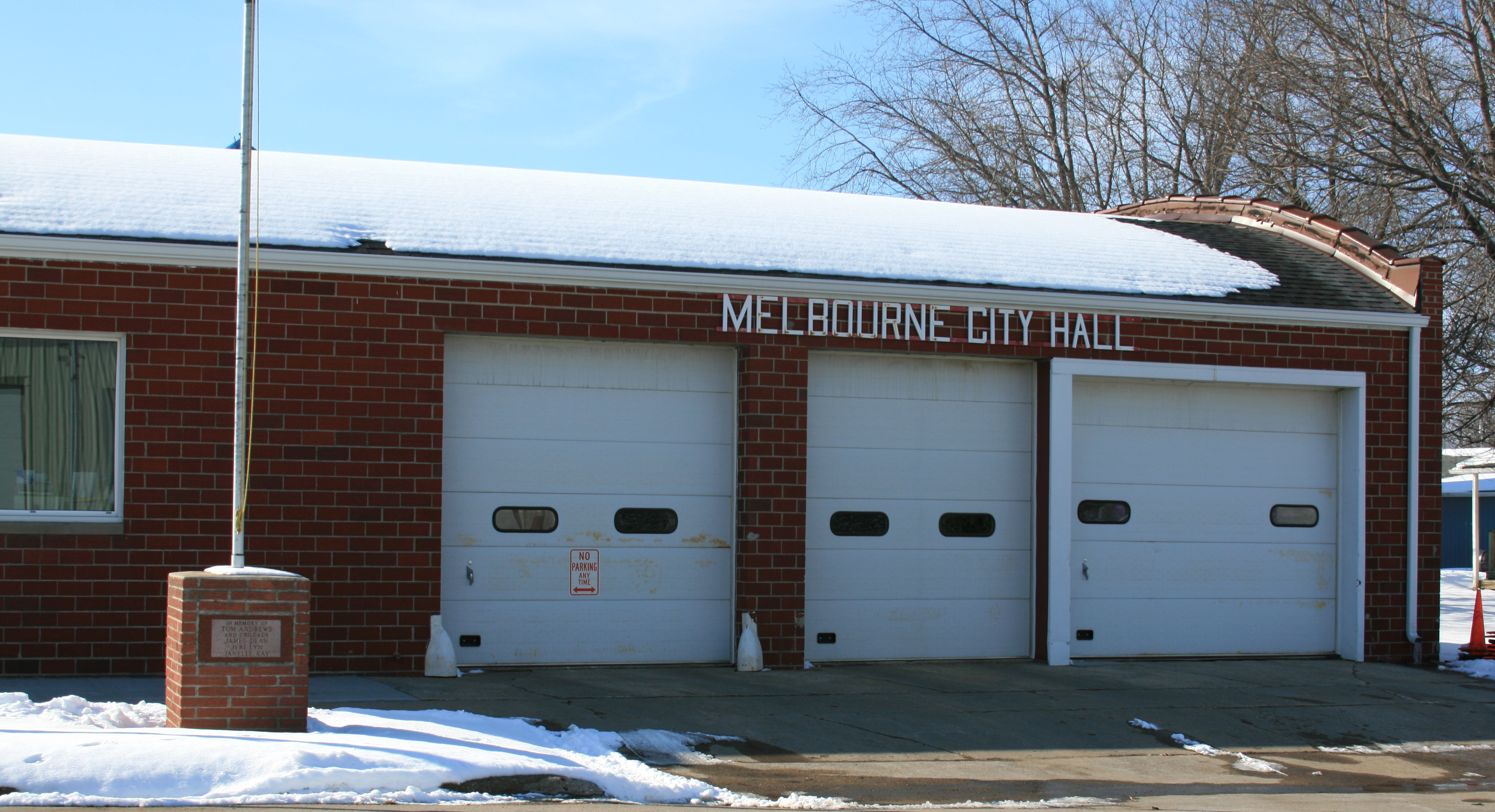
Melbourne City Hall

=== 2020 census ===
As of the census of 2020, there were 786 people, 295 households, and 195 families residing in the city. The population density was 1,488.7 inhabitants per square mile (574.8/km^{2}). There were 323 housing units at an average density of 611.8 per square mile (236.2/km^{2}). The racial makeup of the city was 95.7% White, 0.4% Black or African American, 0.0% Native American, 0.3% Asian, 0.0% Pacific Islander, 0.8% from other races and 2.9% from two or more races. Hispanic or Latino persons of any race comprised 2.5% of the population.

Of the 295 households, 33.6% of which had children under the age of 18 living with them, 54.6% were married couples living together, 9.5% were cohabitating couples, 17.3% had a female householder with no spouse or partner present and 18.6% had a male householder with no spouse or partner present. 33.9% of all households were non-families. 26.8% of all households were made up of individuals, 9.8% had someone living alone who was 65 years old or older.

The median age in the city was 37.3 years. 30.2% of the residents were under the age of 20; 5.5% were between the ages of 20 and 24; 24.7% were from 25 and 44; 25.7% were from 45 and 64; and 14.0% were 65 years of age or older. The gender makeup of the city was 53.1% male and 46.9% female.

=== 2010 census ===
As of the census of 2010, there were 830 people, 322 households, and 218 families living in the city. The population density was 1,456.1 inhabitants per square mile (562.2/km^{2}). There were 354 housing units at an average density of 621.1 per square mile (239.8/km^{2}). The racial makeup of the city was 98.6% White, 0.4% African American, and 1.1% from two or more races. Hispanic or Latino of any race were 1.0% of the population.

There were 322 households, of which 36.6% had children under the age of 18 living with them, 54.0% were married couples living together, 7.5% had a female householder with no husband present, 6.2% had a male householder with no wife present, and 32.3% were non-families. 24.8% of all households were made up of individuals, and 8.7% had someone living alone who was 65 years of age or older. The average household size was 2.58 and the average family size was 3.07.

The median age in the city was 34.8 years. 27.7% of residents were under the age of 18; 7.4% were between the ages of 18 and 24; 30.5% were from 25 to 44; 23.3% were from 45 to 64; and 11% were 65 years of age or older. The gender makeup of the city was 50.4% male and 49.6% female.

=== 2000 census ===
As of the census of 2000, there were 794 people, 318 households, and 218 families living in the city. The population density was 1,402.4 inhabitants per square mile (541.5/km^{2}). There were 332 housing units at an average density of 586.4 per square mile (226.4/km^{2}). The racial makeup of the city was 99.50% White, 0.13% African American, and 0.38% from two or more races. Hispanic or Latino of any race were 0.38% of the population.

There were 318 households, out of which 37.4% had children under the age of 18 living with them, 57.2% were married couples living together, 7.9% had a female householder with no husband present, and 31.4% were non-families. 26.7% of all households were made up of individuals, and 12.3% had someone living alone who was 65 years of age or older. The average household size was 2.50 and the average family size was 3.07.

In the city, the population was spread out, with 27.5% under the age of 18, 9.9% from 18 to 24, 31.6% from 25 to 44, 20.0% from 45 to 64, and 11.0% who were 65 years of age or older. The median age was 33 years. For every 100 females, there were 95.6 males. For every 100 females age 18 and over, there were 86.4 males.

The median income for a household in the city was $47,019, and the median income for a family was $51,250. Males had a median income of $36,528 versus $24,667 for females. The per capita income for the city was $18,641. About 3.1% of families and 3.7% of the population were below the poverty line, including 4.7% of those under age 18 and 2.4% of those age 65 or over.
