= Liscomb, Iowa =

- City
- Location of Liscomb, Iowa
- Coordinates: 42°11′28″N 93°0′12″W
- Country: United States
- State: Iowa
- County: Marshall

Area
  - Total: 1.01 sq mi (2.62 km^{2})
  - Land: 1.01 sq mi (2.62 km^{2})
  - Water: 0 sq mi (0.00 km^{2})
- Elevation: 1,007 ft (307 m)

Population (2020)
  - Total: 291
  - Density: 288.2/sq mi (111.27/km^{2})
- Time zone: UTC-6 (Central (CST))
  - Summer (DST): UTC-5 (CDT)
- ZIP code: 50148
- Area code: 641
- FIPS code: 19-45660
- GNIS feature ID: 2395729

Liscomb is a city in Marshall County, Iowa, United States. The population was 291 at the time of the 2020 census.

== History ==
Liscomb was platted in 1869. It was named for an official of the Iowa Central Railroad.

== Geography ==
According to the United States Census Bureau, the city has a total area of 0.98 square miles (2.54 km^{2}), all land.

== Demographics ==
Historical populations
Year	Pop.	±%
1880	452	—
1890	313	−30.8%
1900	338	+8.0%
1910	354	+4.7%
1920	347	−2.0%
1930	326	−6.1%
1940	340	+4.3%
1950	278	−18.2%
1960	295	+6.1%
1970	328	+11.2%
1980	296	−9.8%
1990	258	−12.8%
2000	272	+5.4%
2010	301	+10.7%
2020	291	−3.3%
Source:"U.S. Census website". United States Census Bureau. and Iowa Data Center; Source: U.S. Decennial Census

=== 2020 census ===
As of the census of 2020, there were 291 people, 107 households, and 77 families residing in the city. The population density was 288.2 inhabitants per square mile (111.3/km^{2}). There were 121 housing units at an average density of 119.8 per square mile (46.3/km^{2}). The racial makeup of the city was 95.5% White, 0.7% Black or African American, 0.7% Native American, 0.0% Asian, 0.0% Pacific Islander, 2.1% from other races and 1.0% from two or more races. Hispanic or Latino persons of any race comprised 3.4% of the population.

Of the 107 households, 37.4% of which had children under the age of 18 living with them, 55.1% were married couples living together, 15.0% were cohabitating couples, 12.1% had a female householder with no spouse or partner present and 17.8% had a male householder with no spouse or partner present. 28.0% of all households were non-families. 22.4% of all households were made up of individuals, 11.2% had someone living alone who was 65 years old or older.

The median age in the city was 35.5 years. 31.6% of the residents were under the age of 20; 3.1% were between the ages of 20 and 24; 25.8% were from 25 and 44; 24.4% were from 45 and 64; and 15.1% were 65 years of age or older. The gender makeup of the city was 51.2% male and 48.8% female.

=== 2010 census ===
As of the census of 2010, there were 301 people, 118 households, and 82 families living in the city. The population density was 307.1 inhabitants per square mile (118.6/km^{2}). There were 127 housing units at an average density of 129.6 per square mile (50.0/km^{2}). The racial makeup of the city was 93.0% White, 3.0% Asian, 2.7% from other races, and 1.3% from two or more races. Hispanic or Latino of any race were 2.0% of the population.

There were 118 households, of which 36.4% had children under the age of 18 living with them, 51.7% were married couples living together, 9.3% had a female householder with no husband present, 8.5% had a male householder with no wife present, and 30.5% were non-families. 22.0% of all households were made up of individuals, and 11% had someone living alone who was 65 years of age or older. The average household size was 2.55 and the average family size was 2.91.

The median age in the city was 37.5 years. 26.9% of residents were under the age of 18; 8.3% were between the ages of 18 and 24; 23.8% were from 25 to 44; 25.8% were from 45 to 64; and 15% were 65 years of age or older. The gender makeup of the city was 48.8% male and 51.2% female.

=== 2000 census ===
As of the census of 2000, there were 272 people, 113 households, and 72 families living in the city. The population density was 276.6 inhabitants per square mile (106.8/km^{2}). There were 125 housing units at an average density of 127.1 per square mile (49.1/km^{2}). The racial makeup of the city was 98.16% White, 0.37% Native American, and 1.47% from two or more races.

There were 113 households, out of which 31.0% had children under the age of 18 living with them, 54.0% were married couples living together, 7.1% had a female householder with no husband present, and 35.4% were non-families. 31.0% of all households were made up of individuals, and 17.7% had someone living alone who was 65 years of age or older. The average household size was 2.41, and the average family size was 3.00.

Age spread: 25.0% under the age of 18, 7.7% from 18 to 24, 28.7% from 25 to 44, 22.1% from 45 to 64, and 16.5% who were 65 years of age or older. The median age was 39 years. For every 100 females, there were 90.2 males. For every 100 females age 18 and over, there were 100.0 males.

The median income for a household in the city was $40,000, and the median income for a family was $41,071. Males had a median income of $28,750 versus $21,667 for females. The per capita income for the city was $16,678. About 9.2% of families and 8.1% of the population were below the poverty line, including 5.2% of those under the age of eighteen and 10.3% of those 65 or over.

== Education ==
BCLUW Community School District operates public schools serving Liscomb. The schools are BCLUW Elementary School in Conrad, BCLUW Middle School in Union, and BCLUW High School in Conrad.

The Beaman-Conrad-Liscomb school district served Liscomb until July 1, 1992, when it merged into BCLUW.
