= Liberty Township, Marshall County, Iowa =

Township in Marshall County, Iowa, U.S.

Coordinates: 42.1583°N 93.1811°W

Liberty Township is a township in Marshall County, Iowa, USA.

== History ==
Liberty Township was established in 1855.
