= St. Anthony, Iowa =

- City
- Location of St. Anthony, Iowa
- Coordinates: 42°07′31″N 93°11′51″W
- Country: United States
- State: Iowa
- County: Marshall

Area
  - Total: 0.61 sq mi (1.59 km^{2})
  - Land: 0.61 sq mi (1.59 km^{2})
  - Water: 0 sq mi (0.00 km^{2})
- Elevation: 1,027 ft (313 m)

Population (2020)
  - Total: 76
  - Density: 124.0/sq mi (47.87/km^{2})
- Time zone: UTC-6 (Central (CST))
  - Summer (DST): UTC-5 (CDT)
- ZIP code: 50239
- Area code: 641
- FIPS code: 19-69780
- GNIS feature ID: 2396473

St. Anthony or Saint Anthony is a city in Marshall County, Iowa, United States. The population was 76 at the time of the 2020 census.

== History ==
St. Anthony was incorporated in 1897 and it was named by two of its founders, John Q. Saint and Anthony R. Pierce.

== Geography ==
According to the United States Census Bureau, the city has a total area of 0.56 square miles (1.45 km^{2}), all land.

== Demographics ==
Historical populations
Year	Pop.	±%
1900	174	—
1910	199	+14.4%
1920	203	+2.0%
1930	202	−0.5%
1940	211	+4.5%
1950	175	−17.1%
1960	130	−25.7%
1970	156	+20.0%
1980	140	−10.3%
1990	112	−20.0%
2000	109	−2.7%
2010	102	−6.4%
2020	76	−25.5%
Source:"U.S. Census website". United States Census Bureau. and Iowa Data Center; Source: U.S. Decennial Census

=== 2020 census ===
As of the census of 2020, there were 76 people, 34 households, and 21 families residing in the city. The population density was 124.0 inhabitants per square mile (47.9/km^{2}). There were 42 housing units at an average density of 68.5 per square mile (26.5/km^{2}). The racial makeup of the city was 89.5% White, 0.0% Black or African American, 0.0% Native American, 1.3% Asian, 0.0% Pacific Islander, 0.0% from other races and 9.2% from two or more races. Hispanic or Latino persons of any race comprised 6.6% of the population.

Of the 34 households, 20.6% of which had children under the age of 18 living with them, 35.3% were married couples living together, 5.9% were cohabitating couples, 17.6% had a female householder with no spouse or partner present and 41.2% had a male householder with no spouse or partner present. 38.2% of all households were non-families. 32.4% of all households were made up of individuals, 5.9% had someone living alone who was 65 years old or older.

The median age in the city was 47.0 years. 23.7% of the residents were under the age of 20; 6.6% were between the ages of 20 and 24; 18.4% were from 25 and 44; 31.6% were from 45 and 64; and 19.7% were 65 years of age or older. The gender makeup of the city was 59.2% male and 40.8% female.

=== 2010 census ===
As of the census of 2010, there were 102 people, 40 households, and 27 families living in the city. The population density was 182.1 inhabitants per square mile (70.3/km^{2}). There were 50 housing units at an average density of 89.3 per square mile (34.5/km^{2}). The racial makeup of the city was 92.2% White, 1.0% African American, 2.9% Native American, 1.0% Asian, and 2.9% from two or more races. Hispanic or Latino of any race were 5.9% of the population.

There were 40 households, of which 37.5% had children under the age of 18 living with them, 40.0% were married couples living together, 15.0% had a female householder with no husband present, 12.5% had a male householder with no wife present, and 32.5% were non-families. 25.0% of all households were made up of individuals, and 5% had someone living alone who was 65 years of age or older. The average household size was 2.55 and the average family size was 3.00.

The median age in the city was 35 years. 28.4% of residents were under the age of 18; 4% were between the ages of 18 and 24; 27.4% were from 25 to 44; 33.3% were from 45 to 64; and 6.9% were 65 years of age or older. The gender makeup of the city was 53.9% male and 46.1% female.

=== 2000 census ===
As of the census of 2000, there were 109 people, 44 households, and 28 families living in the city. The population density was 194.5 inhabitants per square mile (75.1/km^{2}). There were 52 housing units at an average density of 92.8 per square mile (35.8/km^{2}). The racial makeup of the city was 96.33% White, 0.92% Native American, 0.92% from other races, and 1.83% from two or more races. Hispanic or Latino of any race were 0.92% of the population.

There were 44 households, out of which 29.5% had children under the age of 18 living with them, 50.0% were married couples living together, 11.4% had a female householder with no husband present, and 34.1% were non-families. 25.0% of all households were made up of individuals, and 6.8% had someone living alone who was 65 years of age or older. The average household size was 2.48 and the average family size was 2.90.

In the city, the population was spread out, with 24.8% under the age of 18, 11.0% from 18 to 24, 35.8% from 25 to 44, 15.6% from 45 to 64, and 12.8% who were 65 years of age or older. The median age was 34 years. For every 100 females, there were 84.7 males. For every 100 females age 18 and over, there were 100.0 males.

The median income for a household in the city was $30,625, and the median income for a family was $37,500. Males had a median income of $26,875 versus $19,375 for females. The per capita income for the city was $15,218. There were 7.9% of families and 13.1% of the population living below the poverty line, including 15.4% of under eighteens and 5.3% of those over 64.
