= LaMoille, Iowa =

- Unincorporated community
- Location within Iowa Location within the United States
- Coordinates: 42°01′50″N 93°02′19″W
- Country: United States
- State: Iowa
- County: Marshall
- Established: 1867
- Elevation: 968 ft (295 m)
- Time zone: UTC-6 (Central (CST))
  - Summer (DST): UTC-5 (CDT)
- ZIP code: 50158
- Area code: 641

LaMoille (also Lamoille) is a rural unincorporated community in Marshall County, Iowa, United States, lying halfway between Marshalltown and State Center.

== History ==
In August 1855, James B. Abell bought 80 acres in Section 2, and Bryon G. Brown bought 80 acres in Section 3, Washington Township. This is land that LaMoille now occupies in part, for the section line of 2 and 3 is LaMoille's main street. Each man paid $1.50 an acre at the government land office in Iowa City.

Surveyors for the Cedar Rapids and Missouri River Railroad moved on from the line's western terminus at Marshalltown in the spring of 1863. They selected a route along the north side of Linn Creek for the first nine miles because the rising grade was more advantageous. They bridged Linn Creek, known for its flash flooding even then, a mile and a half west of Cedar Crossing (now LaMoille) where the Waterloo stage line from Marietta to Edenville and Des Moines crossed the creek. Here the railroad erected a depot and water tank in late 1863 to service engines which needed water supplies at about seven mile intervals.

John L. Stevens, an employee of the railroad now known as the Chicago and North Western, platted a town on November 8, 1867, in Section 2, Washington township, under direction of the railroad. It was named LaMoille by Issac B. Howe, railroad superintendent, after a town of the same name in his home state of Vermont.

LaMoille was laid out in 1867. It was named after Lamoille, Vermont.

The population was 113 in 1940.
