= Greencastle Township, Marshall County, Iowa =

Township in Marshall County, Iowa, U.S.

Coordinates: 41.906°N 92.824°W

Greencastle Township is a township in Marshall County, Iowa, USA.

== History ==
Greencastle Township was organized in 1856.
