= Clemons, Iowa =

- City
- Location of Clemons, Iowa
- Coordinates: 42°06′50″N 93°09′31″W
- Country: United States
- State: Iowa
- County: Marshall

Area
  - Total: 0.25 sq mi (0.65 km^{2})
  - Land: 0.25 sq mi (0.65 km^{2})
  - Water: 0 sq mi (0.00 km^{2})
- Elevation: 958 ft (292 m)

Population (2020)
  - Total: 140
  - Density: 560.0/sq mi (216.23/km^{2})
- Time zone: UTC-6 (Central (CST))
  - Summer (DST): UTC-5 (CDT)
- ZIP code: 50051
- Area code: 641
- FIPS code: 19-14160
- GNIS feature ID: 2393558

Clemons is a city in Marshall County, Iowa, United States. The population was 140 at the 2020 census.

== History ==
Clemons was founded in 1882, and it was incorporated in 1903.

== Geography ==
According to the United States Census Bureau, the city has a total area of 0.27 square miles (0.70 km^{2}), all land.

== Demographics ==
Historical populations
Year	Pop.	±%
1910	213	—
1920	216	+1.4%
1930	241	+11.6%
1940	207	−14.1%
1950	202	−2.4%
1960	198	−2.0%
1970	178	−10.1%
1980	175	−1.7%
1990	173	−1.1%
2000	148	−14.5%
2010	148	+0.0%
2020	140	−5.4%
Source:"U.S. Census website". United States Census Bureau. and Iowa Data Center; Source: U.S. Decennial Census

=== 2020 census ===
As of the census of 2020, there were 140 people, 46 households, and 28 families residing in the city. The population density was 560.0 inhabitants per square mile (216.2/km^{2}). There were 64 housing units at an average density of 256.0 per square mile (98.8/km^{2}). The racial makeup of the city was 96.4% White, 0.0% Black or African American, 0.7% Native American, 0.0% Asian, 0.0% Pacific Islander, 1.4% from other races and 1.4% from two or more races. Hispanic or Latino persons of any race comprised 4.3% of the population.

Of the 46 households, 17.4% of which had children under the age of 18 living with them, 54.3% were married couples living together, 4.3% were cohabitating couples, 26.1% had a female householder with no spouse or partner present and 15.2% had a male householder with no spouse or partner present. 39.1% of all households were non-families. 30.4% of all households were made up of individuals, 10.9% had someone living alone who was 65 years old or older.

The median age in the city was 36.0 years. 32.9% of the residents were under the age of 20; 2.1% were between the ages of 20 and 24; 23.6% were from 25 and 44; 25.7% were from 45 and 64; and 15.7% were 65 years of age or older. The gender makeup of the city was 47.1% male and 52.9% female.

=== 2010 census ===
As of the census of 2010, there were 148 people, 57 households, and 43 families living in the city. The population density was 548.1 inhabitants per square mile (211.6/km^{2}). There were 66 housing units at an average density of 244.4 per square mile (94.4/km^{2}). The racial makeup of the city was 96.6% White, 2.7% Asian, and 0.7% from two or more races. Hispanic or Latino of any race were 0.7% of the population.

There were 57 households, of which 29.8% had children under the age of 18 living with them, 66.7% were married couples living together, 3.5% had a female householder with no husband present, 5.3% had a male householder with no wife present, and 24.6% were non-families. 21.1% of all households were made up of individuals, and 7.1% had someone living alone who was 65 years of age or older. The average household size was 2.60 and the average family size was 2.98.

The median age in the city was 42.5 years. 25% of residents were under the age of 18; 7.4% were between the ages of 18 and 24; 22.3% were from 25 to 44; 26.3% were from 45 to 64; and 18.9% were 65 years of age or older. The gender makeup of the city was 55.4% male and 44.6% female.

=== 2000 census ===
As of the census of 2000, there were 148 people, 61 households, and 43 families living in the city. The population density was 547.7 inhabitants per square mile (211.5/km^{2}). There were 68 housing units at an average density of 251.6 per square mile (97.1/km^{2}). The racial makeup of the city was 97.30% White, 1.35% African American, and 1.35% from two or more races.

There were 61 households, out of which 26.2% had children under the age of 18 living with them, 52.5% were married couples living together, 14.8% had a female householder with no husband present, and 29.5% were non-families. 21.3% of all households were made up of individuals, and 11.5% had someone living alone who was 65 years of age or older. The average household size was 2.43 and the average family size was 2.84.

In the city, the population was spread out, with 23.6% under the age of 18, 8.1% from 18 to 24, 33.1% from 25 to 44, 23.6% from 45 to 64, and 11.5% who were 65 years of age or older. The median age was 36 years. For every 100 females, there were 117.6 males. For every 100 females age 18 and over, there were 98.2 males.

The median income for a household in the city was $46,964, and the median income for a family was $45,625. Males had a median income of $32,500 versus $27,188 for females. The per capita income for the city was $18,517. There were none of the families and 4.2% of the population living below the poverty line, including no under eighteens and none of those over 64.
