= Le Grand, Iowa =

- City
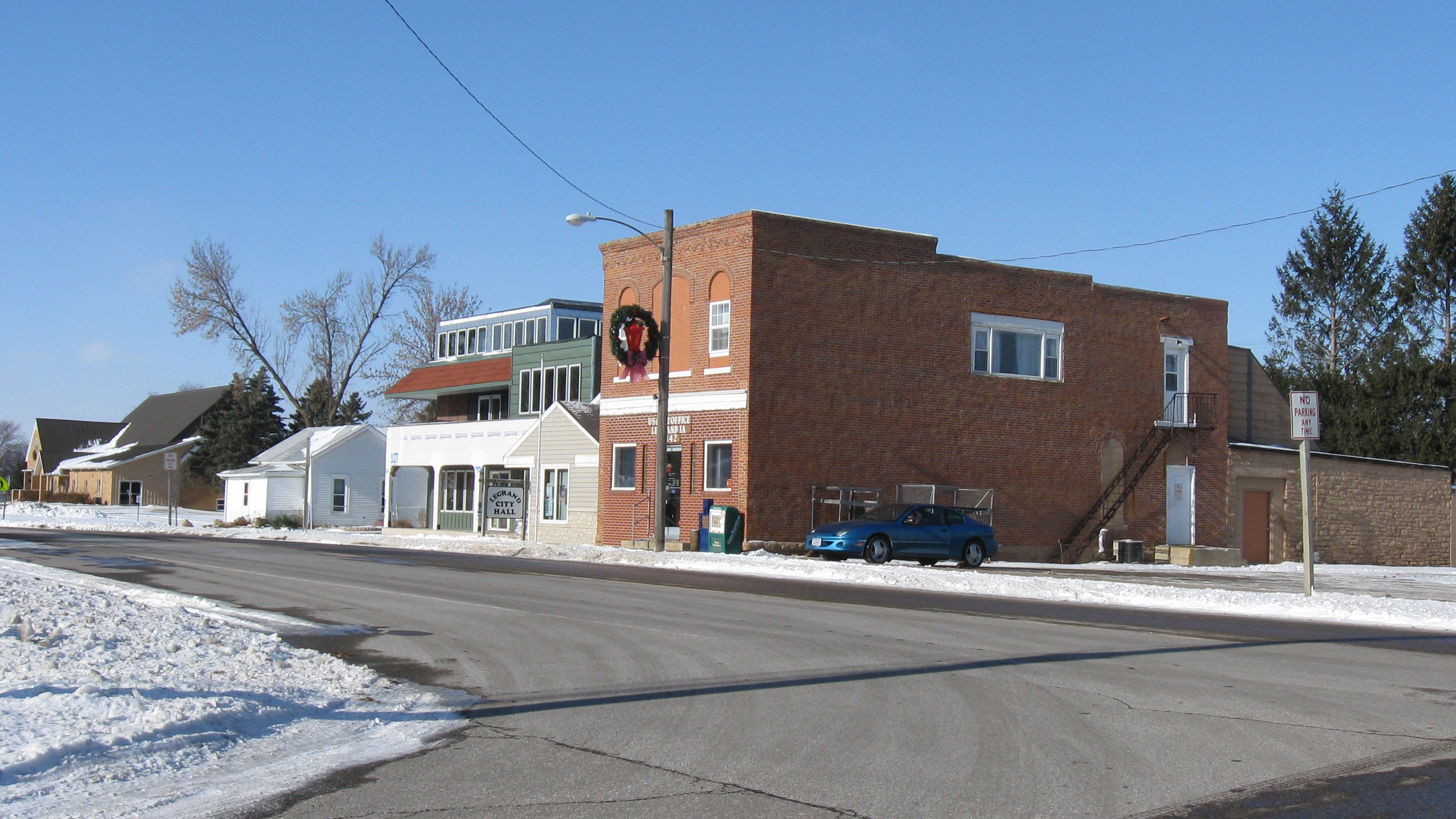
- Downtown Le Grand, Iowa

- Location of Le Grand, Iowa
- Coordinates: 42°00′12″N 92°46′30″W
- Country: United States
- State: Iowa
- Counties: Marshall, Tama

Area
  - Total: 1.05 sq mi (2.71 km^{2})
  - Land: 1.04 sq mi (2.69 km^{2})
  - Water: 0.0077 sq mi (0.02 km^{2})
- Elevation: 932 ft (284 m)

Population (2020)
  - Total: 905
  - Density: 871.4/sq mi (336.44/km^{2})
- Time zone: UTC-6 (Central (CST))
  - Summer (DST): UTC-5 (CDT)
- ZIP code: 50142
- Area code: 641
- FIPS code: 19-44220
- GNIS feature ID: 2395654
- Website: www.legrandiowa.com

Le Grand is a city in Marshall and Tama counties in the U.S. state of Iowa. The population was 905 at the time of the 2020 census.

== History ==
Le Grand was laid out in 1852, and it was incorporated in 1891. The city was named for Le Grande Byington, the original owner of the town site.

As early as about 1866 the firm of Kirby and Howe established the LeGrand Quarry Co. on the outskirts of LeGrand. This included a railroad station and village known as 'Little Italy' where workers produced the fine limestone, marble and crushed rock for which the area became famous. The village was platted by them in 1868 as Quarry, Iowa.

== Geography ==
According to the United States Census Bureau, the city has a total area of 1.05 square miles (2.72 km^{2}), of which 1.04 square miles (2.69 km^{2}) is land and 0.01 square miles (0.03 km^{2}) is water.

== Demographics ==
Historical populations
Year	Pop.	±%
1880	341	—
1890	378	+10.9%
1900	408	+7.9%
1910	338	−17.2%
1920	320	−5.3%
1930	382	+19.4%
1940	329	−13.9%
1950	393	+19.5%
1960	465	+18.3%
1970	565	+21.5%
1980	921	+63.0%
1990	854	−7.3%
2000	883	+3.4%
2010	938	+6.2%
2020	905	−3.5%
Source:"U.S. Census website". United States Census Bureau. and Iowa Data Center; Source: U.S. Decennial Census

=== 2020 census ===
As of the census of 2020, there were 905 people, 373 households, and 243 families residing in the city. The population density was 871.4 inhabitants per square mile (336.4/km^{2}). There were 393 housing units at an average density of 378.4 per square mile (146.1/km^{2}). The racial makeup of the city was 91.7% White, 0.8% Black or African American, 0.3% Native American, 0.0% Asian, 0.0% Pacific Islander, 2.4% from other races and 4.8% from two or more races. Hispanic or Latino persons of any race comprised 6.4% of the population.

Of the 373 households, 27.6% of which had children under the age of 18 living with them, 51.7% were married couples living together, 6.7% were cohabitating couples, 24.4% had a female householder with no spouse or partner present and 17.2% had a male householder with no spouse or partner present. 34.9% of all households were non-families. 30.0% of all households were made up of individuals, 15.8% had someone living alone who was 65 years old or older.

The median age in the city was 40.3 years. 28.2% of the residents were under the age of 20; 4.6% were between the ages of 20 and 24; 21.9% were from 25 and 44; 25.3% were from 45 and 64; and 20.0% were 65 years of age or older. The gender makeup of the city was 48.3% male and 51.7% female.

=== 2010 census ===
As of the census of 2010, there were 938 people, 382 households, and 276 families living in the city. The population density was 901.9 inhabitants per square mile (348.2/km^{2}). There were 401 housing units at an average density of 385.6 units per square mile (148.9 units/km^{2}). The racial makeup of the city was 97.1% White, 0.1% African American, 0.4% Native American, 0.1% Asian, 0.1% Pacific Islander, 1.6% from other races, and 0.5% from two or more races. Hispanic or Latino of any race were 3.5% of the population.

There were 382 households, of which 32.2% had children under the age of 18 living with them, 55.8% were married couples living together, 11.3% had a female householder with no husband present, 5.2% had a male householder with no wife present, and 27.7% were non-families. 23.6% of all households were made up of individuals, and 8.1% had someone living alone who was 65 years of age or older. The average household size was 2.46 and the average family size was 2.87.

The median age in the city was 41.9 years. 25.3% of residents were under the age of 18; 7.3% were between the ages of 18 and 24; 22.2% were from 25 to 44; 29.1% were from 45 to 64; and 16% were 65 years of age or older. The gender makeup of the city was 48.8% male and 51.2% female.

=== 2000 census ===
As of the census of 2000, there were 883 people, 339 households, and 261 families living in the city. The population density was 847.0 inhabitants per square mile (327.0/km^{2}). There were 353 housing units at an average density of 338.6 units per square mile (130.7 units/km^{2}). The racial makeup of the city was 97.96% White, 0.34% African American, 0.45% Native American, 0.34% Asian, 0.23% from other races, and 0.68% from two or more races. Hispanic or Latino of any race were 1.81% of the population.

There were 339 households, out of which 36.3% had children under the age of 18 living with them, 64.9% were married couples living together, 10.3% had a female householder with no husband present, and 23.0% were non-families. 20.6% of all households were made up of individuals, and 8.8% had someone living alone who was 65 years of age or older. The average household size was 2.60 and the average family size was 3.00.

27.4% are under the age of 18, 7.2% from 18 to 24, 26.2% from 25 to 44, 25.4% from 45 to 64, and 13.8% who were 65 years of age or older. The median age was 36 years. For every 100 females, there were 95.4 males. For every 100 females age 18 and over, there were 94.2 males.

The median income for a household in the city was $39,333, and the median income for a family was $42,153. Males had a median income of $33,333 versus $23,036 for females. The per capita income for the city was $16,470. About 3.3% of families and 4.5% of the population were below the poverty line, including 5.3% of those under age 18 and 5.0% of those age 65 or over.

== Education ==
East Marshall Community School District serves the community. The district was established on July 1, 1992, by the merger of the LDF and SEMCO school districts.

== Notable person ==
Jack Coombs, nicknamed "Colby Jack" after his alma mater was an American professional baseball player.

== See also ==
- Le Grand Bridge (1896)
- Le Grand Bridge (1914)
