= Marshall County, Iowa =

County in Iowa, United States

- County
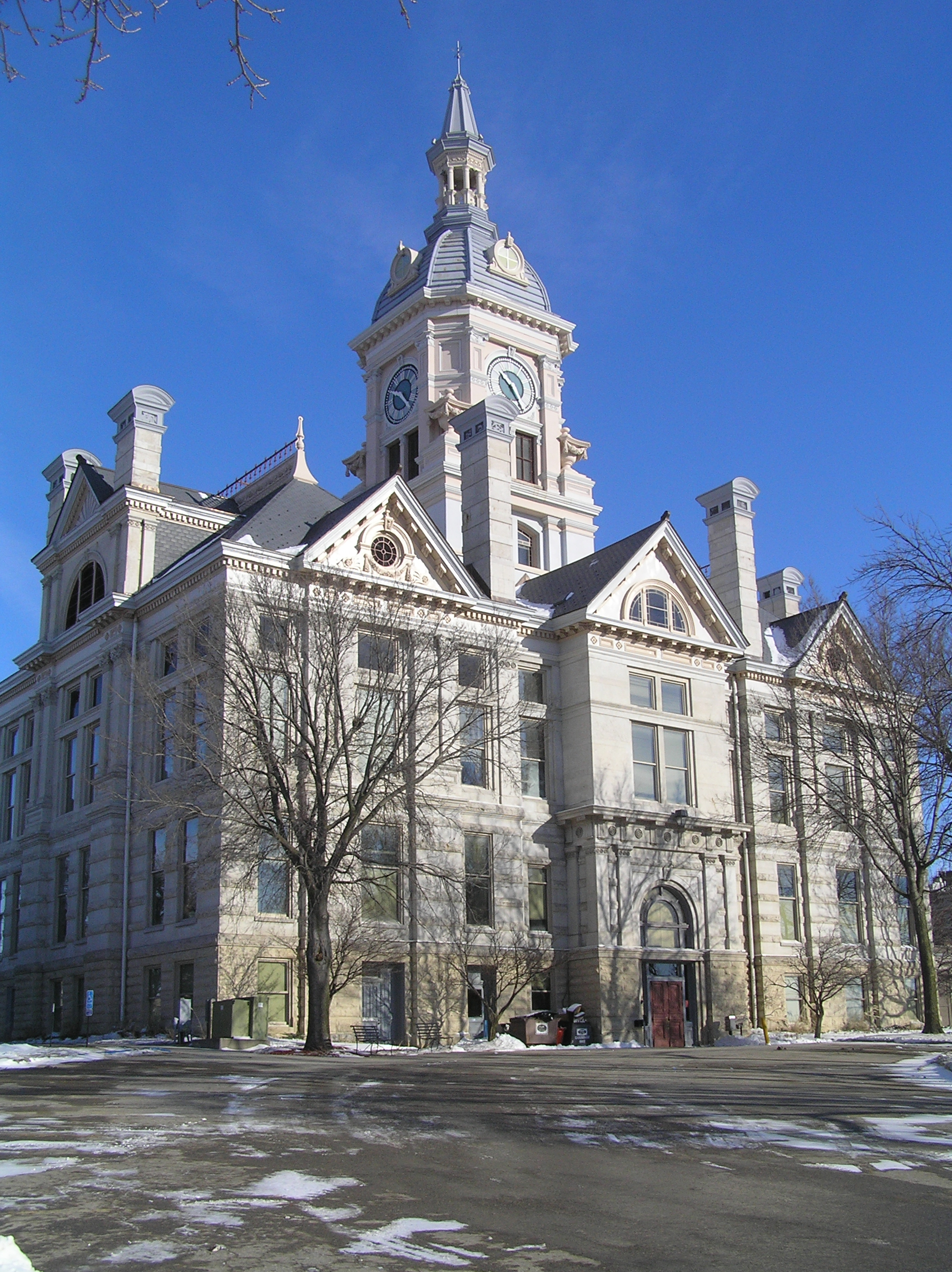
- The courthouse in Marshalltown is on the NRHP

- Location within the U.S. state of Iowa
- Coordinates: 42.041700°N 92.981403°W
- Country: United States
- State: Iowa
- Founded: January 13, 1846
- Named for: John Marshall
- Seat: Marshalltown
- Largest city: Marshalltown

Area
  - Total: 573.199 sq mi (1,484.58 km^{2})
  - Land: 572.503 sq mi (1,482.78 km^{2})
  - Water: 0.696 sq mi (1.80 km^{2}) 0.12%

Population (2020)
  - Total: 40,105
  - Estimate (2025): 39,890 ▼
  - Density: 70.052/sq mi (27.047/km^{2})
- Time zone: UTC−6 (Central)
  - Summer (DST): UTC−5 (CDT)
- Area code: 641
- Congressional district: 1st
- Website: marshallcountyia.gov
- Iowa county number 64

Marshall County is a county located in the U.S. state of Iowa. As of the 2020 census, the population was 40,105, and was estimated to be 39,890 in 2025. The county seat and largest city is Marshalltown. The county was formed on January 13, 1846, and named after John Marshall, Chief Justice of the United States Supreme Court. Marshall County comprises the Marshalltown, Iowa Micropolitan Statistical Area. In 2010, the center of population of Iowa was located in Marshall County, near Melbourne.

== Geography ==
According to the United States Census Bureau, the county has a total area of 573.199 square miles (1,484.58 km^{2}), of which 572.503 square miles (1,482.78 km^{2}) is land and 0.696 square miles (1.80 km^{2}) (0.12%) is water. It is the 43rd largest county in Iowa by total area.

=== Transit ===
- Marshalltown Municipal Transit

=== Major highways ===
- US 30
- Iowa 14
- Iowa 96
- Iowa 146
- Iowa 330

=== Adjacent counties ===
- Jasper County (South)
- Tama County (East)
- Story County (West)
- Hardin County (Northwest)
- Grundy County (North)

== Demographics ==
Historical population
Census	Pop.	Note	%±
1850	338		—
1860	6,015		1,679.6%
1870	17,576		192.2%
1880	23,752		35.1%
1890	25,842		8.8%
1900	29,991		16.1%
1910	30,279		1.0%
1920	32,630		7.8%
1930	33,727		3.4%
1940	35,406		5.0%
1950	35,611		0.6%
1960	37,984		6.7%
1970	41,076		8.1%
1980	41,652		1.4%
1990	38,276		−8.1%
2000	39,311		2.7%
2010	40,648		3.4%
2020	40,105		−1.3%
2025 (est.)	39,890	▼	−0.5%
U.S. Decennial Census; 1790–1960 1900–1990; 1990–2000 2010–2020

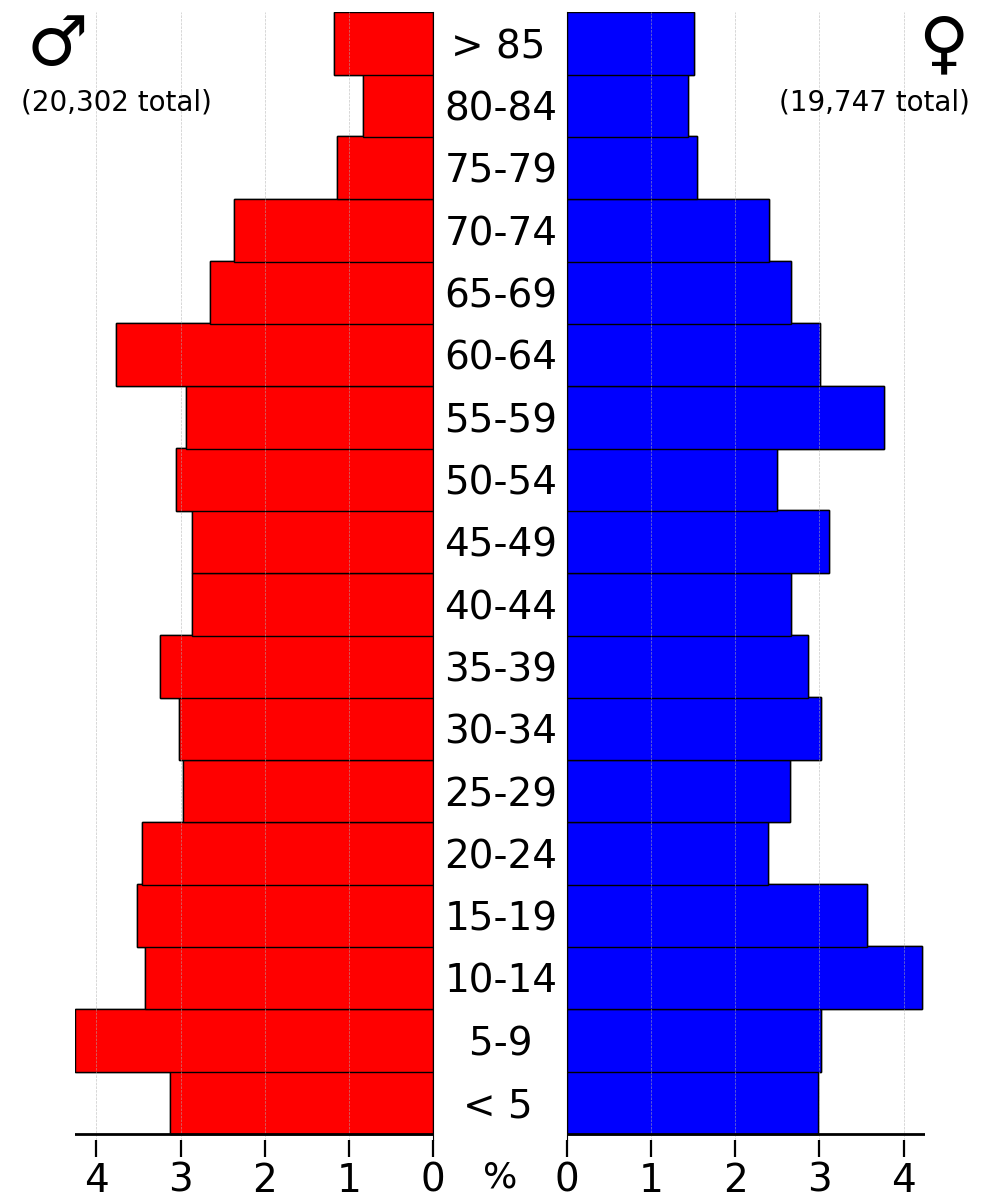
2022 US Census population pyramid for Marshall County from ACS 5-year estimates

=== Housing market ===
As of the second quarter of 2025, the median home value in Marshall County was $150,876.

=== American Community Survey ===
As of the 2024 American Community Survey, households averaged 2.48 persons per household. The county's median household income was $72,785, approximately 11.1% of residents lived at or below the poverty line, the estimated employment rate was 63.9%, 21.4% of residents held a bachelor's degree or higher, and 87.0% had at least a high school diploma.

=== Racial and ethnic composition ===
Marshall County, Iowa – racial and ethnic composition Note: the US Census treats Hispanic/Latino as an ethnic category. This table excludes Latinos from the racial categories and assigns them to a separate category. Hispanics/Latinos may be of any race.
Race / ethnicity (NH = non-Hispanic)	Pop. 1980	Pop. 1990	Pop. 2000	Pop. 2010	Pop. 2020
White alone (NH)	40,739 (97.81%)	37,308 (97.47%)	34,640 (88.12%)	31,807 (78.25%)	27,438 (68.42%)
Black or African American alone (NH)	266 (0.64%)	278 (0.73%)	348 (0.89%)	629 (1.55%)	785 (1.96%)
Native American or Alaska Native alone (NH)	75 (0.18%)	94 (0.25%)	127 (0.32%)	104 (0.26%)	153 (0.38%)
Asian alone (NH)	163 (0.39%)	294 (0.77%)	307 (0.78%)	526 (1.29%)	1,514 (3.78%)
Pacific Islander alone (NH)	—	—	17 (0.04%)	39 (0.10%)	33 (0.08%)
Other race alone (NH)	135 (0.32%)	10 (0.03%)	35 (0.09%)	33 (0.08%)	59 (0.15%)
Mixed race or multiracial (NH)	—	—	314 (0.80%)	493 (1.21%)	983 (2.45%)
Hispanic or Latino (any race)	274 (0.66%)	292 (0.76%)	3,523 (8.96%)	7,017 (17.26%)	9,140 (22.79%)
Total	41,652 (100.00%)	38,276 (100.00%)	39,311 (100.00%)	40,648 (100.00%)	40,105 (100.00%)

=== 2020 census ===
As of the 2020 census, there were 40,105 people, 15,358 households, and 10,161 families residing in the county. The median age was 39.2 years, 25.2% of residents were under the age of 18, and 19.3% were 65 years of age or older. For every 100 females there were 102.4 males, and for every 100 females age 18 and over there were 101.6 males age 18 and over.

The racial makeup of the county was 73.8% White, 2.0% Black or African American, 0.8% American Indian and Alaska Native, 3.8% Asian, 0.1% Native Hawaiian and Pacific Islander, 10.3% from some other race, and 9.2% from two or more races. Hispanic or Latino residents of any race comprised 22.8% of the population.

68.3% of residents lived in urban areas, while 31.7% lived in rural areas.

There were 15,358 households in the county, of which 31.3% had children under the age of 18 living in them. Of all households, 50.3% were married-couple households, 18.9% were households with a male householder and no spouse or partner present, and 24.1% were households with a female householder and no spouse or partner present. About 28.6% of all households were made up of individuals and 13.5% had someone living alone who was 65 years of age or older.

There were 16,745 housing units at an average density of 29.25 per square mile (11.3/km^{2}); 8.3% were vacant. Among occupied housing units, 72.3% were owner-occupied and 27.7% were renter-occupied. The homeowner vacancy rate was 1.3% and the rental vacancy rate was 10.3%.

=== 2010 census ===
As of the 2010 census, there were 40,648 people, 15,538 households, and _ families residing in the county. The population density was 71.00 inhabitants per square mile (27.4/km^{2}). There were 16,831 housing units at an average density of 29.40 per square mile (11.4/km^{2}). The racial makeup of the county was 88.74% White, 1.67% African American, 0.46% Native American, 1.32% Asian, 0.12% Pacific Islander, 5.65% from some other races and 2.04% from two or more races. Hispanic or Latino people of any race were 17.26% of the population.

=== 2000 census ===
As of the 2000 census, there were 39,311 people, 15,338 households, and 10,460 families residing in the county. The population density was 68.67 inhabitants per square mile (26.5/km^{2}). There were 16,324 housing units at an average density of 28.51 per square mile (11.0/km^{2}). The racial makeup of the county was 90.44% White, 0.93% African American, 0.35% Native American, 0.78% Asian, 0.06% Pacific Islander, 6.03% from some other races and 1.42% from two or more races. Hispanic or Latino people of any race were 8.96% of the population.

There were 15,338 households 31.10% had children under the age of 18 living with them, 55.40% were married couples living together, 9.30% had a female householder with no husband present, and 31.80% were non-families. 26.90% of households were one person and 12.20% were one person aged 65 or older. The average household size was 2.48 and the average family size was 3.00.

The age distribution was 25.30% under the age of 18, 8.10% from 18 to 24, 26.30% from 25 to 44, 23.90% from 45 to 64, and 16.40% 65 or older. The median age was 39 years. For every 100 females there were 99.20 males. For every 100 females age 18 and over, there were 96.50 males.

The median household income was $38,268 and the median family income was $46,627. Males had a median income of $33,809 versus $24,063 for females. The per capita income for the county was $19,176. About 7.10% of families and 10.20% of the population were below the poverty line, including 14.30% of those under age 18 and 8.60% of those age 65 or over.

== Communities ==
=== Cities ===
- Albion
- Clemons
- Ferguson
- Gilman
- Haverhill
- Laurel
- Le Grand
- Liscomb
- Marshalltown
- Melbourne
- Rhodes (previously named Edenville)
- St. Anthony
- State Center

=== Census-designated place ===
- Green Mountain

=== Other unincorporated communities ===
- Bangor
- Bromley
- Dunbar
- Harvester
- LaMoille
- Marietta
- Minerva
- Quarry
- Van Cleve
- Wolf Lake Addition

=== Townships ===
- Bangor
- Eden
- Greencastle
- Iowa
- Jefferson
- Le Grand
- Liberty
- Liscomb
- Logan
- Marietta
- Marion
- Marshall
- Minerva
- State Center
- Taylor
- Timber Creek
- Vienna
- Washington

=== Population ranking ===
The population ranking of the following table is based on the 2020 census of Marshall County.

† county seat

Rank	City/Town/etc.	Municipal type	Population (2020 Census)	Population (2024 Estimate)
1	† Marshalltown	City	27,591	27,886
2	State Center	City	1,391	1,403
3	Le Grand (partially in Tama County)	City	905	891
4	Melbourne	City	786	771
5	Gilman	City	542	530
6	Albion	City	448	444
7	Liscomb	City	291	292
8	Rhodes	City	271	269
9	Laurel	City	220	214
10	Haverhill	City	165	164
11	Clemons	City	140	135
12	Green Mountain	CDP	113	115
13	Ferguson	City	97	98
14	St. Anthony	City	76	77

== Politics ==
Prior to 1964, Marshall County was strongly Republican, never backing a Democratic presidential candidate from 1880 to 1960 and only failing to back a Republican candidate during those years in 1912 with a strong third-party campaign by former president Theodore Roosevelt on the Bull Moose ticket. Since then, it has become far more of a swing county, having backed the national winner in the seven presidential elections from 1992 to 2016. That streak was broken in 2020, when Donald Trump won the county but lost nationally. The county is considered a bellwether polity.

United States presidential election results for Marshall County, Iowa
Year	Republican		Democratic		Third party(ies)	
Year	No.	%	No.	%	No.	%
1896	4,541	61.85%	2,626	35.77%	175	2.38%
1900	4,878	65.07%	2,329	31.07%	289	3.86%
1904	4,229	66.74%	1,203	18.98%	905	14.28%
1908	3,887	61.34%	1,941	30.63%	509	8.03%
1912	926	13.79%	2,162	32.19%	3,629	54.03%
1916	4,172	60.32%	2,414	34.90%	330	4.77%
1920	9,334	79.10%	2,166	18.36%	300	2.54%
1924	9,010	68.09%	1,516	11.46%	2,707	20.46%
1928	9,326	72.90%	3,384	26.45%	82	0.64%
1932	6,604	48.98%	6,385	47.36%	494	3.66%
1936	7,377	52.66%	6,297	44.95%	334	2.38%
1940	8,503	56.44%	6,497	43.13%	65	0.43%
1944	7,325	55.67%	5,598	42.55%	234	1.78%
1948	6,698	52.19%	5,602	43.65%	533	4.15%
1952	11,135	65.93%	5,314	31.46%	441	2.61%
1956	10,305	62.74%	5,755	35.04%	365	2.22%
1960	10,265	60.23%	6,761	39.67%	16	0.09%
1964	6,323	39.09%	9,815	60.68%	38	0.23%
1968	9,402	56.35%	6,362	38.13%	922	5.53%
1972	10,798	60.85%	6,618	37.30%	328	1.85%
1976	9,562	51.33%	8,695	46.67%	373	2.00%
1980	10,707	54.56%	7,114	36.25%	1,805	9.20%
1984	10,839	54.63%	8,809	44.40%	192	0.97%
1988	7,657	43.63%	9,760	55.62%	132	0.75%
1992	6,784	37.09%	8,303	45.40%	3,202	17.51%
1996	7,017	40.50%	8,669	50.04%	1,638	9.46%
2000	8,785	49.85%	8,322	47.22%	517	2.93%
2004	9,557	49.87%	9,443	49.27%	164	0.86%
2008	8,278	44.36%	10,023	53.71%	362	1.94%
2012	8,472	44.44%	10,257	53.80%	335	1.76%
2016	9,146	50.87%	7,652	42.56%	1,182	6.57%
2020	9,571	52.77%	8,176	45.08%	389	2.14%
2024	9,815	56.83%	7,134	41.31%	321	1.86%

== See also ==
- Marshall County Courthouse
- National Register of Historic Places listings in Marshall County, Iowa
