= John C. Cochrane =

American architect (1835–1887)

John Crombie Cochrane
- Born: 1835
- Died: 1887 (aged 51–52)
- Occupation: Architect
- Buildings: Iowa State Capitol, Illinois State Capitol

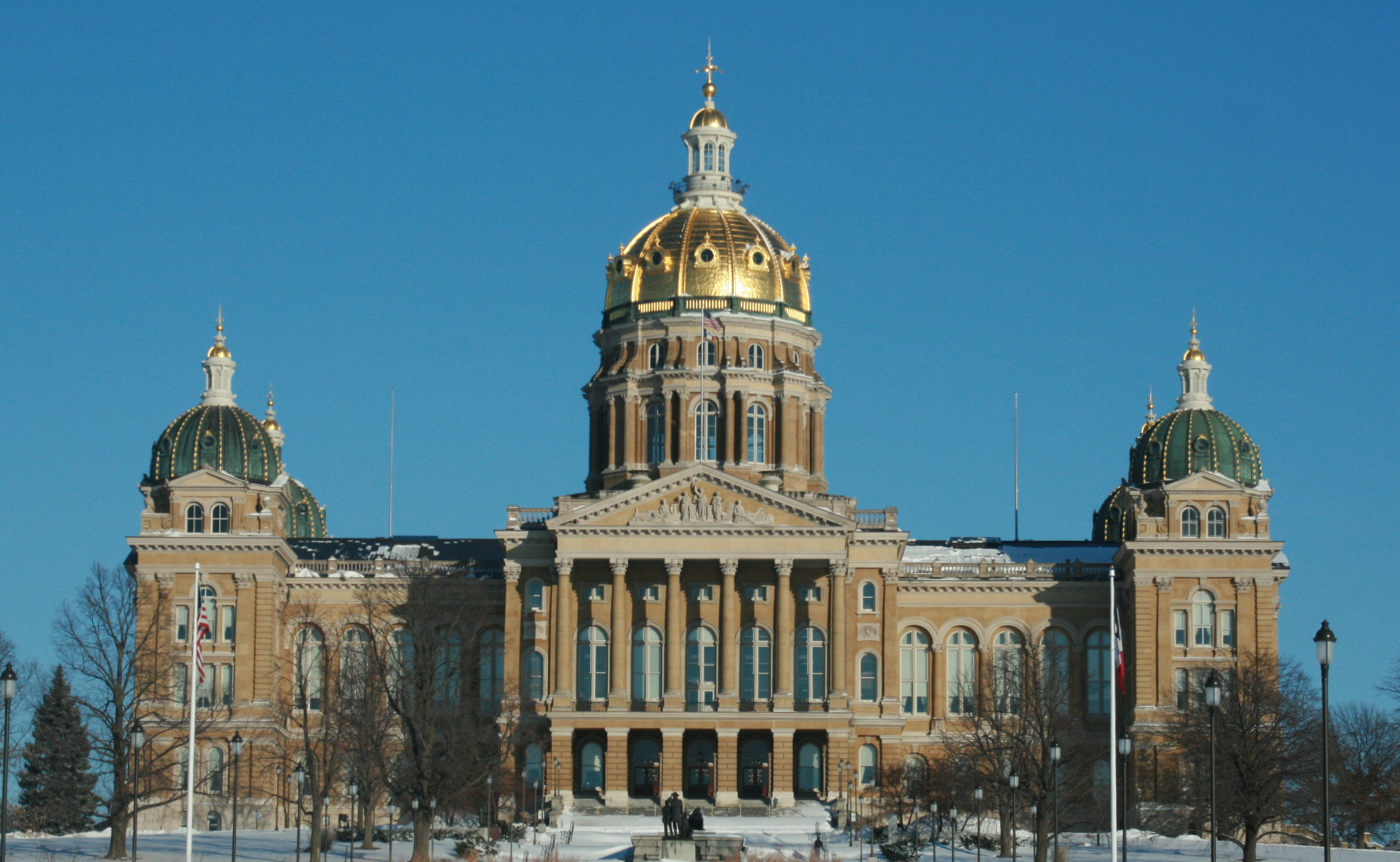
Iowa State Capitol

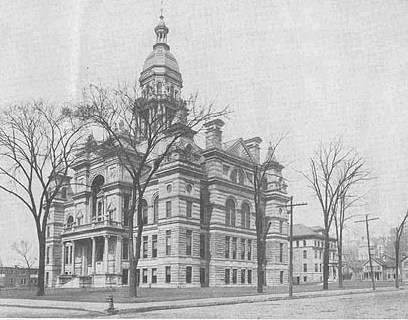
The former Scott County Courthouse

John Crombie Cochrane (1835–1887) was an architect in the 19th century practicing in Chicago, Illinois. He formed Cochrane and Garnsey with George O. Garnsey.

He began work in Davenport, Iowa in 1856, moving to St. Louis in 1858 after the Panic of 1857. With the onset of the Civil War, he returned to his boyhood home in New Hampshire. In 1864, he moved to Chicago and began working as an architect, with his design being selected for the Illinois State Capitol in 1868.

He designed numerous buildings, including:

- Iowa State Capitol, Grand Ave. and E. 12th St., Des Moines, Iowa (Cochrane, J.), listed on the National Register of Historic Places (NRHP)
- Illinois State Capitol, Capitol Avenue and Second Street, Springfield, IL NRHP-listed
- Cook County Hospital, 1835 West Harrison St., Chicago, IL NRHP-listed
- All Saints Episcopal Church, 4550 N. Hermitage, Chicago, IL, Chicago Historical Landmark, a rare local example of the "stick style".
- Lambrite-Iles-Petersen House, 510 W. 6th St., Davenport, IA, one of the earliest examples of Italianate architecture in the state of Iowa and a contributing property in the Hamburg Historic District.
- Livingston County Courthouse, 112 W. Madison, Pontiac, IL (Cochrane, J.C.) NRHP-listed
- Marshall County Courthouse, Courthouse Sq., Marshalltown, IA (Cochrane, J.C.) NRHP-listed
- Ivory Quinby House, 605 N. 6th St., Monmouth, IL (Cochrane, J.C.) NRHP-listed
- One or more buildings in Marshalltown Downtown Historic District, Roughly bounded by 2nd St., State St., 3rd. Ave., and E. Church St., Marshalltown, IA (Cochrane, John C.) NRHP-listed
- One or more buildings in St. Katherine's Historic District, 901 Tremont St., Davenport, IA (Cochrane, John C.) NRHP-listed
- The former Scott County Courthouse, Davenport, IA, completed by architect John W. Ross after Cochrane's death
- Riverside Presbyterian Church, Riverside, Illinois
- Private residence at 140 Herrick Road in Riverside, Illinois
