= Hotel Tallcorn =

Historic hotel in Iowa

Coordinates: 42.0493°N 92.9107°W

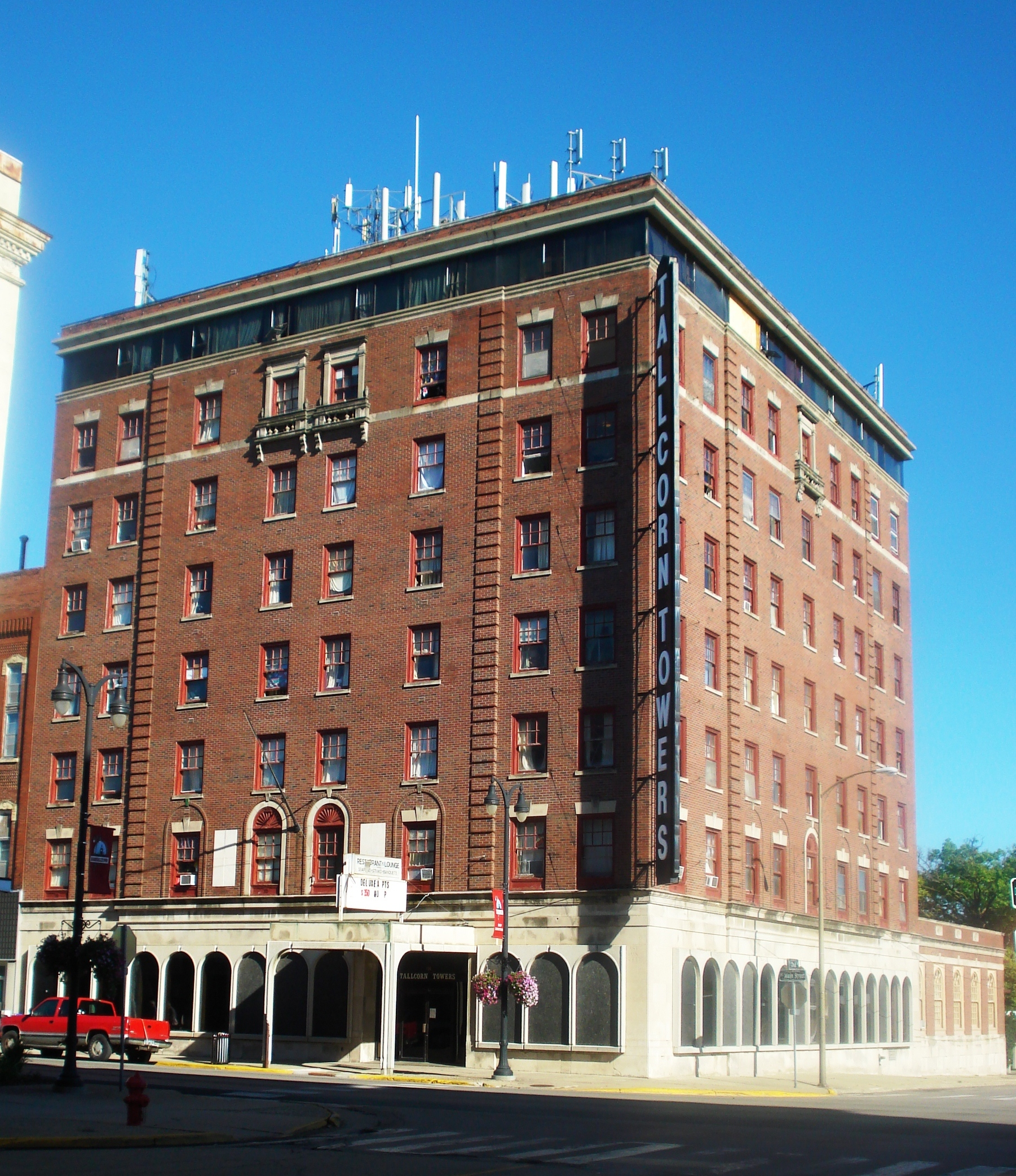
- Tallcorn Towers
- Interactive map of the Hotel Tallcorn area

General information
- Location: Marshalltown, Iowa, United States
- Completed: 1928
- Cost: $500,000
- Client: Eppley Hotel Company

Technical details
- Size: 7-stories
- Hotel Tallcorn
- U.S. Historic district – Contributing property
- Location within Iowa Location within the United States
- Part of: Marshalltown Downtown Historic District (ID01001463)
- Added to NRHP: January 17, 2002

The Hotel Tallcorn is located in Marshalltown, Iowa. Today it is called the Tallcorn Towers Apartments. Built in 1928 by the Eppley Hotel Company, local citizens contributed $120,000 to ensure the successful completion of this seven-story hotel. It was completed in connection to the seventy-fifth anniversary of Marshalltown. The hotel's sale in 1956 from the Eppley chain to the Sheraton Corporation was part of the second largest hotel sale in United States history. The Tallcorn was listed as a contributing property in the Marshalltown Downtown Historic District on the National Register of Historic Places in 2002.

== History ==
In the 1920s, Marshalltown was a bustling community, and hub of three railways: the Chicago and Northwestern, the Chicago-Great Western, and the Minneapolis and St. Louis. Even so, the town lacked a major amenity — a hotel suitable to serve as a community center for social functions.

Seeing this need, the Eppley Hotel Company of Omaha built and operated the Hotel Tallcorn. They hired H.L. Stevens and Company as the architect, the same company that had designed and built The Chieftain in Council Bluffs The Martin in Sioux City.

Completed on October 5, 1928, Hotel Tallcorn was the first hotel of its kind in Marshalltown. It opened with 125 rooms ranging from $1.50 to $13.00 per night. At that time, Marshalltown was a town of 20,000 people — but the Hotel Tallcorn was built large enough to support a town of 50,000 people. Hotel Tallcorn showed confidence in the community and eventually, a convention hall and theatre were also built.

Hotel Tallcorn was a major part of Downtown Marshalltown when it was built. There were a pharmacy and soda fountain room on the first floor. The building also included a cigar stand, gift shop, café, and tea room. A former manager of the room believed the store was stocked with some of the best novelties in the state, including perfumes valued at $35.00 per ounce — almost three times the cost of the most expensive room!

Hotel Tallcorn has been converted from a 128-room hotel into 42 one-bedroom and 7 two-bedroom apartments. An $11 million restoration was completed at Hotel Tallcorn, following the state and national historic preservation guidelines. The project was partially funded through historic preservation tax credits. As part of the restoration, the stone masonry and windows were repaired and the original sign was repainted.

After restoration, the Hotel Tallcorn has reclaimed its position as an anchor in the Marshalltown Downtown Historic District, which was named an Iowa Great Place in 2014. The building is listed on the National Register of Historic Places because it was significant in the development of Downtown Marshalltown.
