= Lambrite–Iles–Petersen House =

Historic house in Iowa, United States

- U.S. Historic district – Contributing property
- Davenport Register of Historic Properties
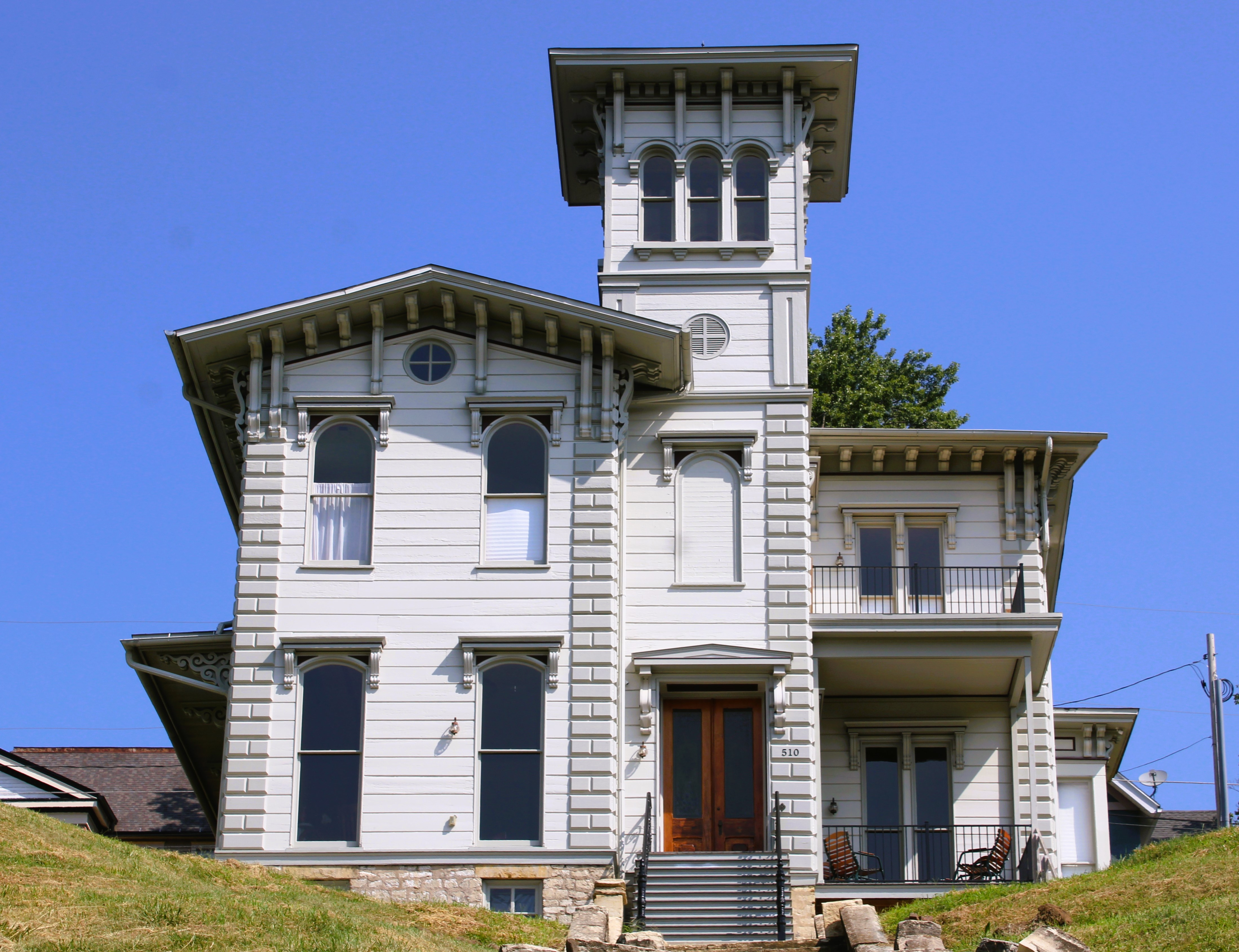
- Lambrite-Iles-Petersen House in 2023

- Location within Iowa Location within the United States
- Location: 510 W. 6th St. Davenport, Iowa
- Coordinates: 41°31′33.7074″N 90°34′49.137″W
- Built: 1856
- Architect: John C. Cochrane
- Architectural style: Italian villa
- Part of: Hamburg Historic District (ID83003656)
- MPS: Davenport MRA
- DRHP No.: 54

Significant dates
- Added to NRHP: November 18, 1983
- Designated DRHP: July 25, 2012

The Lambrite–Iles–Petersen House is a historic home located in the Hamburg Historic District in Davenport, Iowa, United States. The district was added to the National Register of Historic Places in 1983. The house was individually listed on the Davenport Register of Historic Properties in 2012. This was the first residence built in the city in the Italian villa style and one of the earliest examples in the state of Iowa. The house is named for three of its early owners: Joseph Lambrite, a lumber mill owner who built the house, Dr. Thomas Iles, a physician, and John H.C. Petersen, who founded Davenport's largest department store that grew to become Von Maur.

== History ==
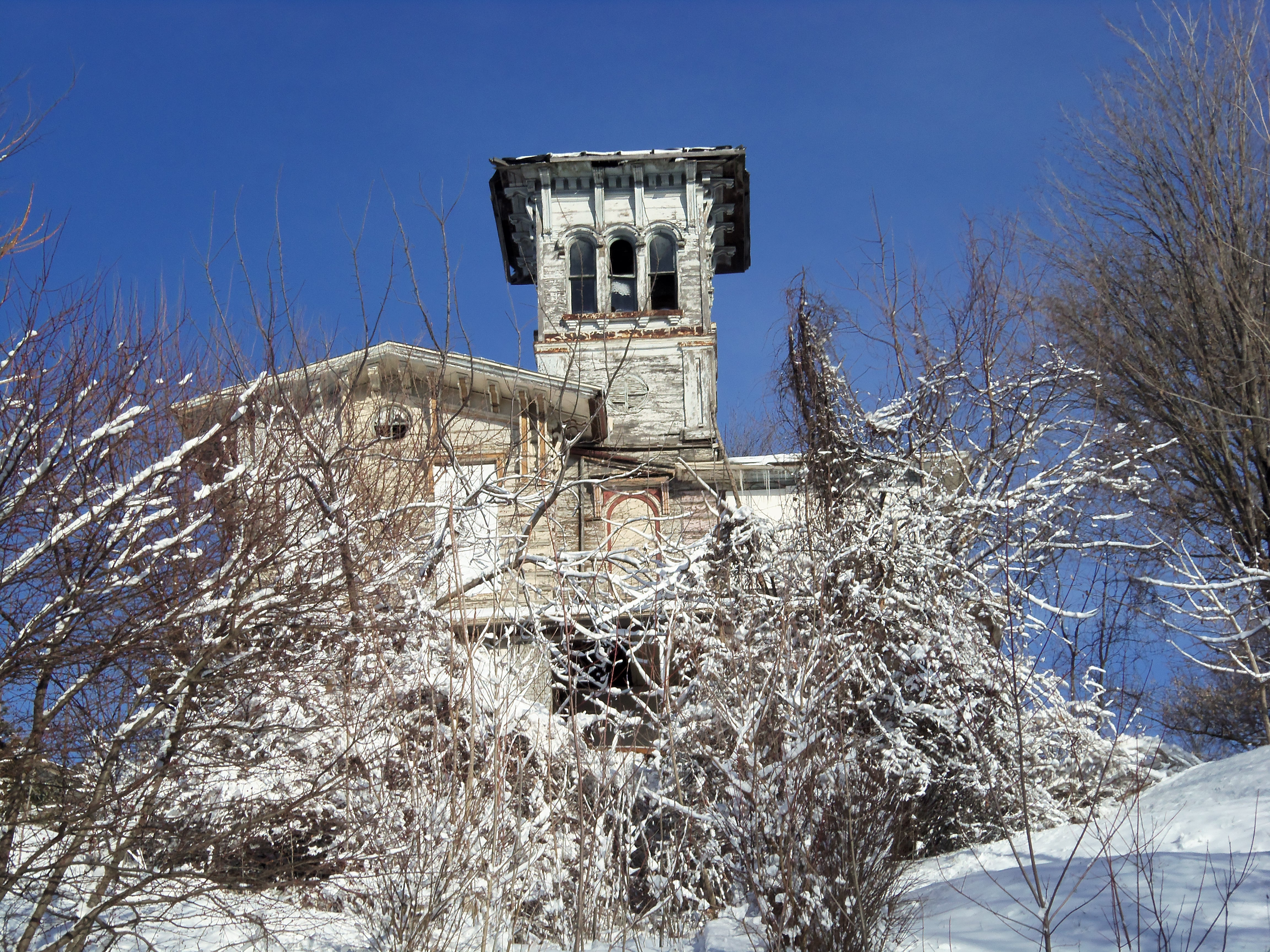
The house in December 2012

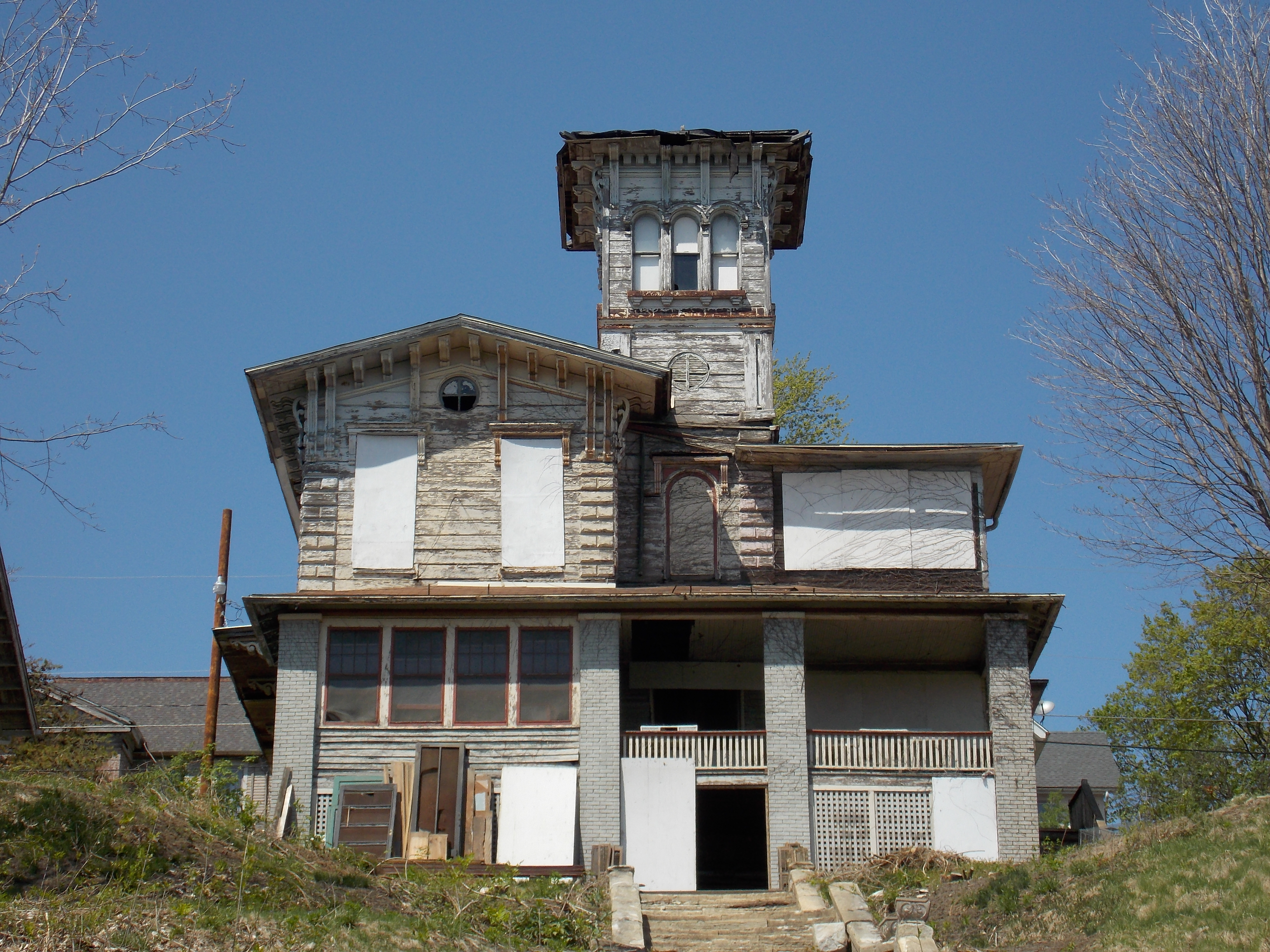
The house in April 2015

The Lambrite–Iles–Petersen House was designed by one of Davenport's first professional architects John C. Cochrane, and it was built in 1856. Soon after the house was built Lambrite lost everything in the Panic of 1857. Several other people owned the house until it was purchased by Thomas Iles around 1863. John H.C. Petersen bought the house after Iles's death in the mid-1880s and owned it until his own death in 1910. The Petersen family retained ownership of the house for ten years, selling it to Joseph Schick in 1920. Schick enclosed the porches in the craftsman-style, creating sunrooms, and built a craftsman-style bungalow on the west lawn in 1925.

The house was eventually turned into three apartments until co-owners Gordon Muller and Dean Christensen restored the house in the mid-1970s. Since that time, maintenance on the house has been neglected and it was declared uninhabited by the city in 2010. Its local landmark status recognizes its significance, history, and assists the city's historic preservation commission if it decides to intervene on the structure's behalf. The house was added to Iowa's most endangered properties list in 2013. In May 2014 the city of Davenport began the process of condemning the house. It was the first time the city has attempted to save an abandoned house through condemnation. In September 2014 the city purchased the house through condemnation for $34,000. In February the following year, Dick and Linda Stone of Muscatine, Iowa bought the house for $38,000. They have been restoring the house ever since, including the restoration of the original secco fresco that covers the walls on the three-story central staircase.

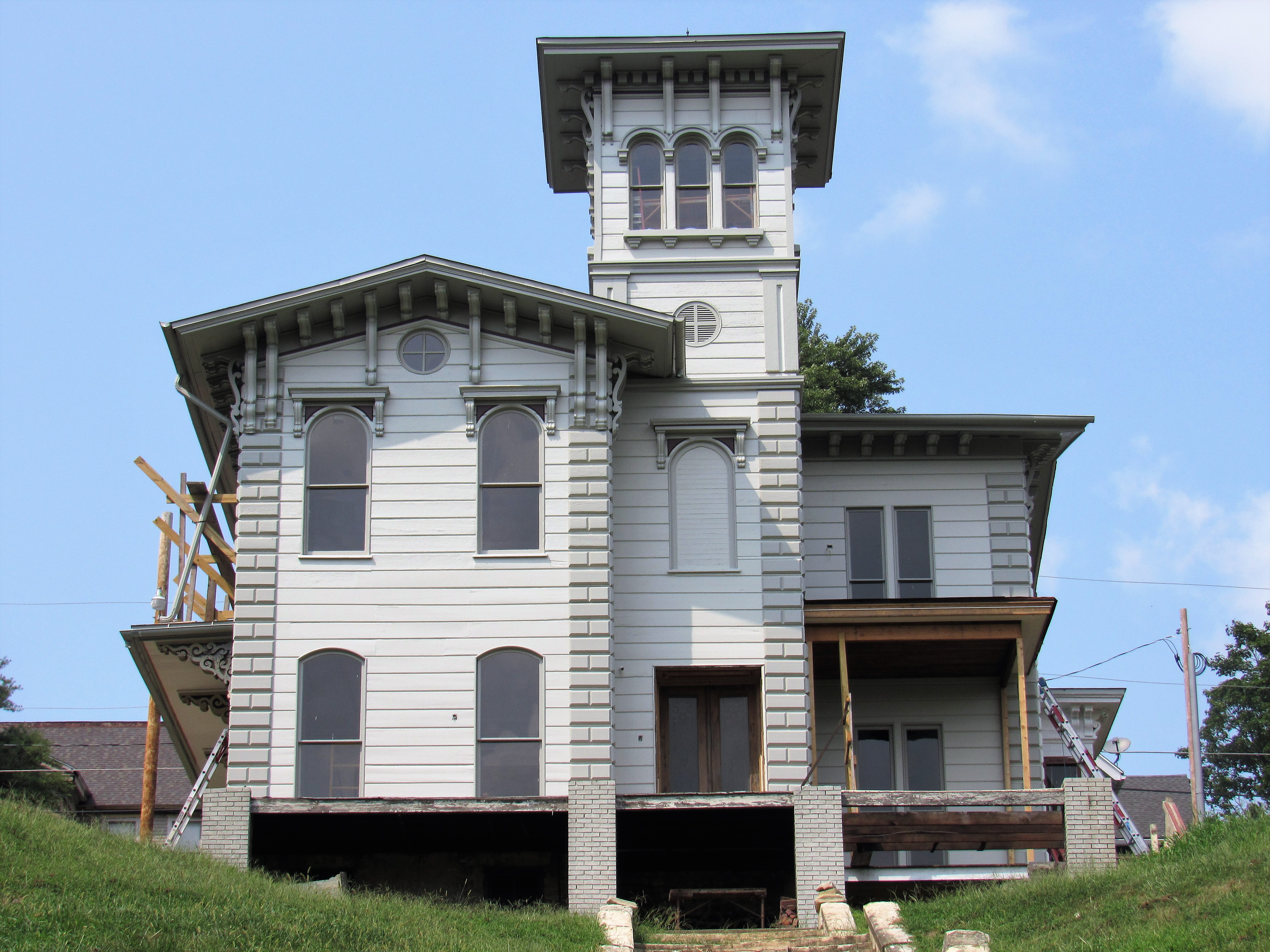
The house in August 2018

=== Joseph Lambrite ===
Joseph Lambrite was a partner in Davenport's largest sawmill, a major industry in the city's early history. The mill was located on the Mississippi River between Scott and Ripley Streets.

=== Thomas Jefferson Iles ===
Thomas Iles was a physician in Midway, Kentucky. He married Maria Louisa Nuckols and together they had eight children, seven boys, and a girl. In 1862 the family moved to Davenport. He served as the chief surgeon of the Civil War Confederate prison camp located at the Rock Island Arsenal. Iles became a prominent doctor in Davenport after the war, and he owned the house until his death.

=== John H.C. Petersen ===
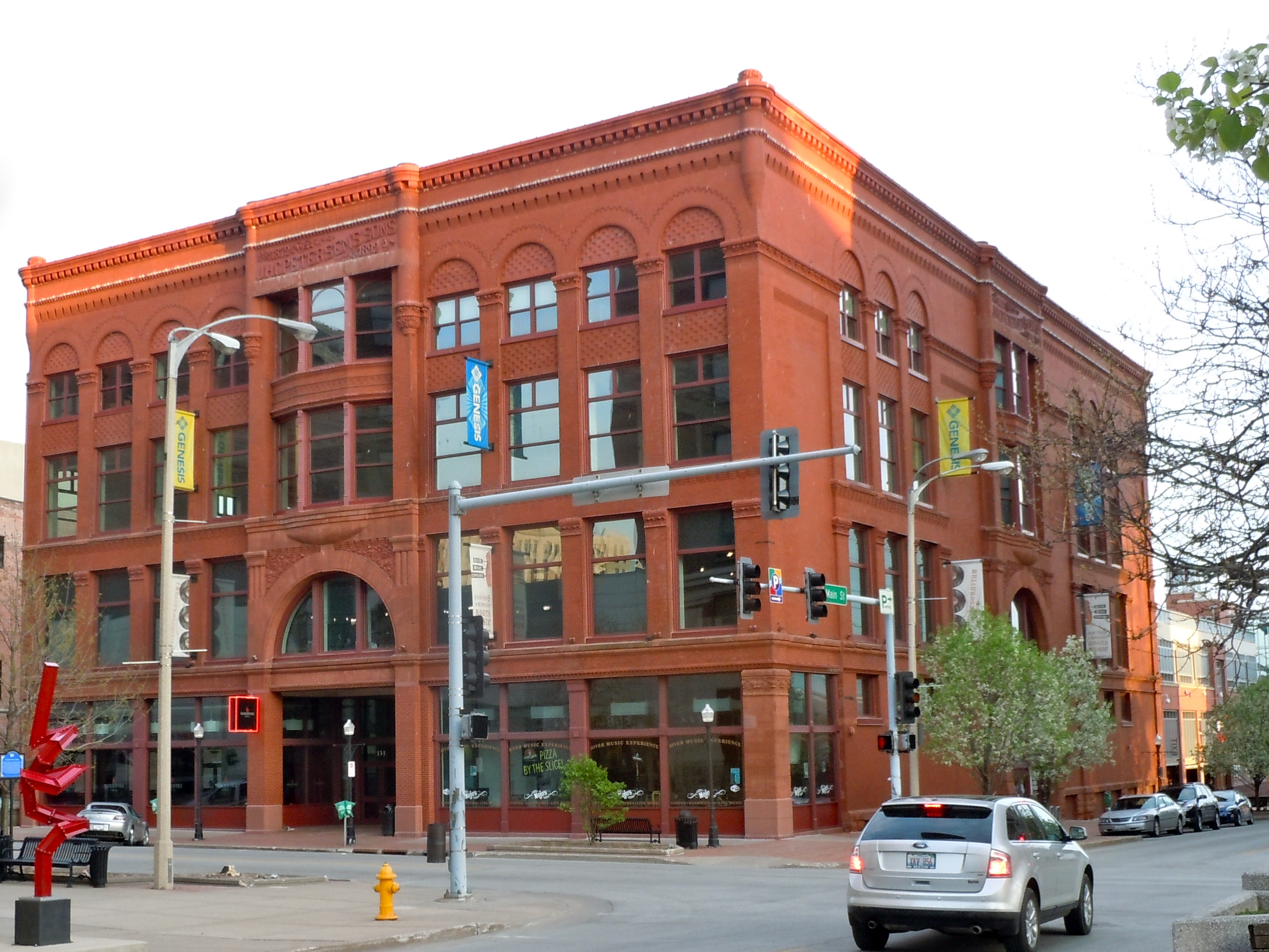
J.H.C. Petersen's Sons' Store in downtown Davenport

John H. C. Petersen was born in Schleswig in present-day Germany and went to school until he was 16 when he was apprenticed to a dry-goods seller. Petersen married Johanna Elsbeth Hansen in 1844 and they had ten children together. The family immigrated to the United States in 1860 and settled in Scott County, Iowa where he initially worked as a farm hand. Two years later he began his mercantile career. For the first few years, he had a partner to whom he later sold his interest in the business. In 1872 he established the business by which he would be known for the rest of his life. The J.H.C. Petersen's Sons' Store was located at 219 Second Street. As the business grew he added the building at 220 Second Street and then later 217-217½ Second Street. The store became one of the foremost mercantile establishments in Davenport. In 1916 it was sold to Charles J. von Maur, R.H. Harned, and Cable von Maur, who owned their own store. The two stores were merged into a new store named Petersen Harned Von Maur in 1928. In 1989 the store's name was shortened to Von Maur.

== Architecture ==
The house is a two-story frame structure in the Italian Villa style. It features a three-story tower, bracketed eaves, tall windows, and quoins on the corners. It is unknown who painted the three-story fresco in the central staircase. It was painted using the trompe l'oeil style that makes the walls look like white marble with inset panels of green marble that are trimmed with wood molding. The porches added in 1925 have been removed and two small porches and a balcony have been restored. The roof is composed of a synthetic slate. A two-story addition was built onto the back house, and it has been rebuilt in the 21st-century restoration. A two-car garage that is architecturally compatible with the house was built into the hillside next to the house.
