= Christian Jipp Home & Grocery =

Historic house in Iowa, United States

- U.S. Historic district – Contributing property
- Davenport Register of Historic Properties
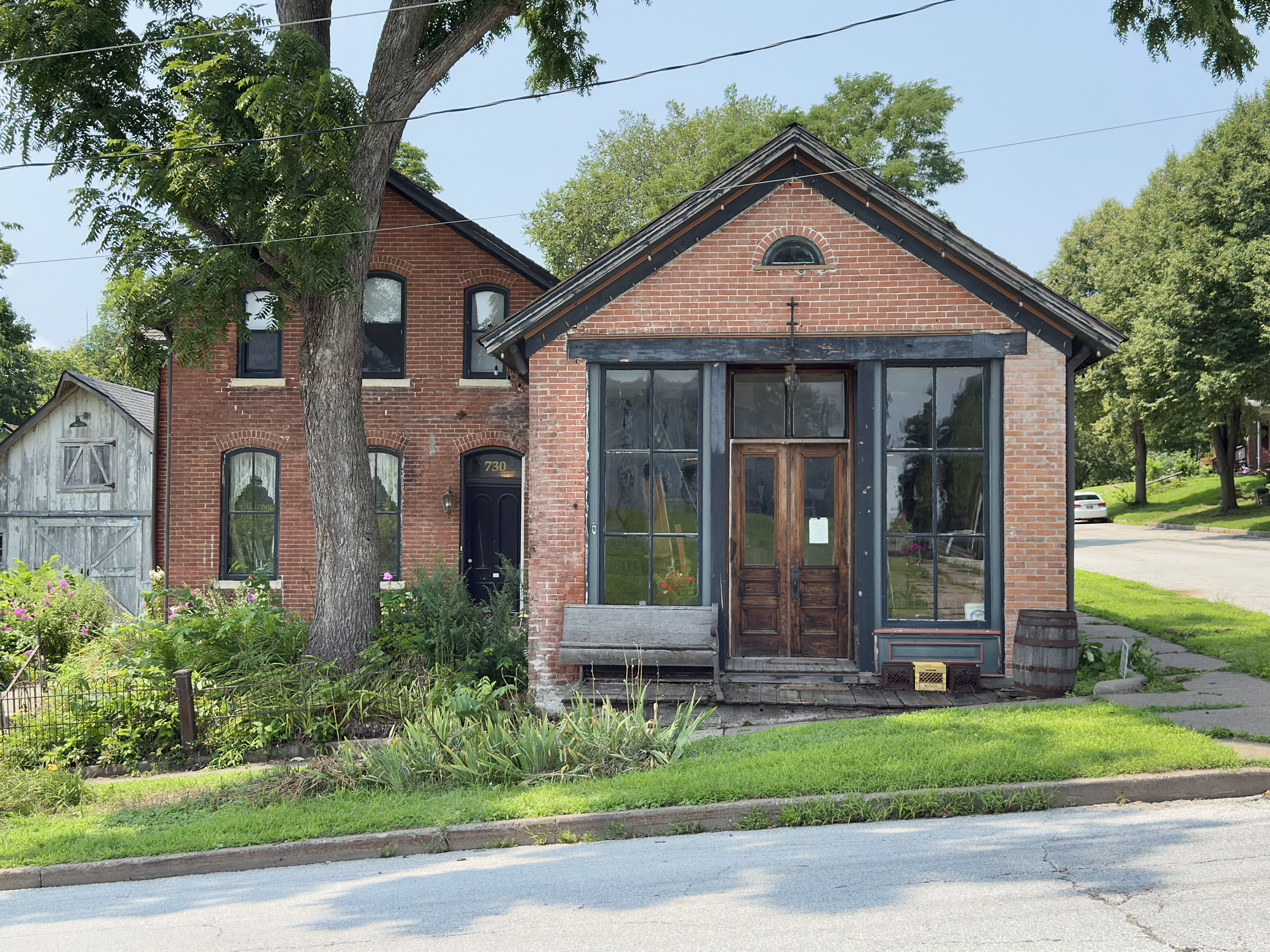

- Location within Iowa Location within the United States
- Location: 730-732 Gaines St. Davenport, Iowa
- Coordinates: 41°31′40″N 90°35′0″W
- Area: less than one acre
- Built: 1868/1878
- Part of: Hamburg Historic District (ID83003656)
- MPS: Davenport MRA
- DRHP No.: 44

Significant dates
- Added to NRHP: November 18, 1983
- Designated DRHP: July 5, 2005

The Christian Jipp Home & Grocery is a historic building located in the Hamburg Historic District in Davenport, Iowa, United States. The district was added to the National Register of Historic Places in 1983. The house and grocery was individually listed on the Davenport Register of Historic Properties in 2005.

== History ==
The grocery store was completed in 1868 by Christian Jipp, an immigrant from present-day Germany. It was one of the first retail buildings that was built on the bluff in Davenport. Jipp, his wife and three daughters lived in the back of the store until the house was added in 1878. He operated the store until 1906 and the store itself remained open until 1958 when it was converted into a laundromat and the house became a rental property. The building had been vacant for 20 years and was slated by the city for demolition in 2004 when the Gateway Redevelopment Group received private and public funds to stabilize the structure and then to renovate it. The building now serves as the Architectural Rescue Shop, which collects, restores, preserves and sells old architectural items. There is also an apartment on the second floor of the structure.
