= Marshalltown Downtown Historic District =

Historic district in Iowa, United States

- U.S. National Register of Historic Places
- U.S. Historic district
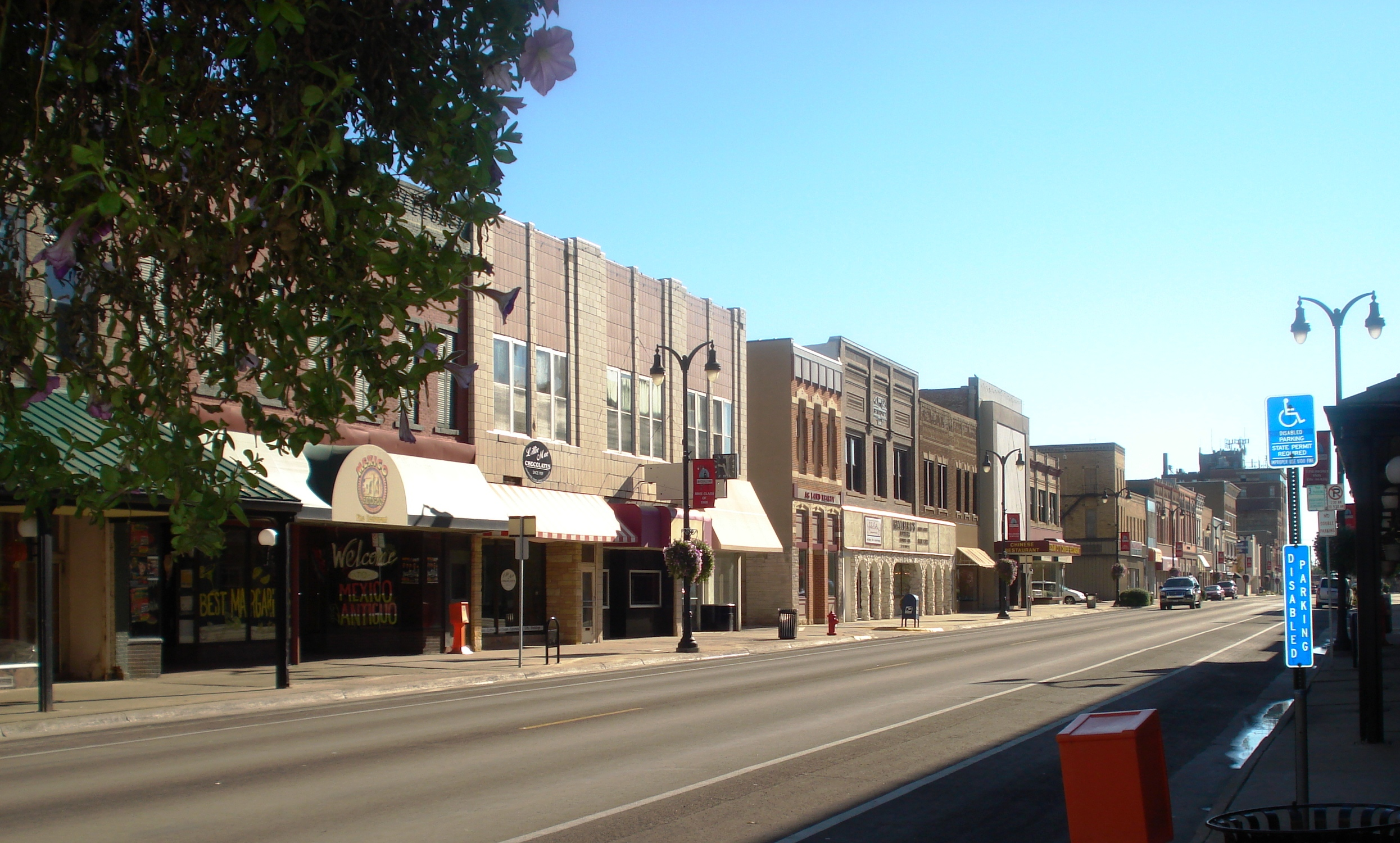

- Location within Iowa Location within the United States
- Interactive map showing the location of Marshalltown Downtown Historic District
- Location: Roughly bounded by 2nd St., State St., 3rd. Ave., and E. Church St. Marshalltown, Iowa
- Coordinates: 42°02′57″N 92°54′48″W
- Area: more than 10 acres (4.0 ha)
- Architectural style: Italianate; Romanesque Revival
- NRHP reference No.: 01001463
- Added to NRHP: January 17, 2002

The Marshalltown Downtown Historic District is a historic district located in Marshalltown, Iowa, United States. It was listed on the National Register of Historic Places in 2002. At the time of its nomination it contained 96 resources, which included 79 contributing buildings, one contributing site, and 16 non-contributing buildings. The historic district covers most of the city's central business district. All of it is within the original town of Marshalltown, which was laid out and recorded on August 15, 1853, as the village of Marshall. Confusion with a town with the same name in Henry County led this village to be renamed Marshalltown in 1862. It was incorporated the following year.

The district contains a mix of commercial buildings, an opera house, a movie theater, a fraternal hall, and warehouses. The civic buildings include the Marshall County Courthouse, sheriff's residence, municipal building, civic auditorium and public library. The buildings range in size from narrow, two-story commercial blocks to three-story corner blocks, and the seven-story Hotel Tallcorn. The period of significance is from 1862 to 1950, and the buildings are constructed during that time frame. The commercial Italianate, Romanesque Revival, and especially vernacular architecture are dominant. Prominent architects who have buildings in the district include John C. Cochrane (courthouse; 1886), Patton and Miller (public library; 1902), Harry E. Reimer (Marshalltown Municipal Building; 1921), and Josselyn and Todd (Marshalltown Memorial Coliseum; 1929).

A tornado struck Marshalltown on July 19, 2018. It did significant damage to many buildings in the historic district, including the courthouse, city hall, and the civic auditorium.
