= All Saints Episcopal Church (Chicago) =

Church in Ravenswood, Chicago

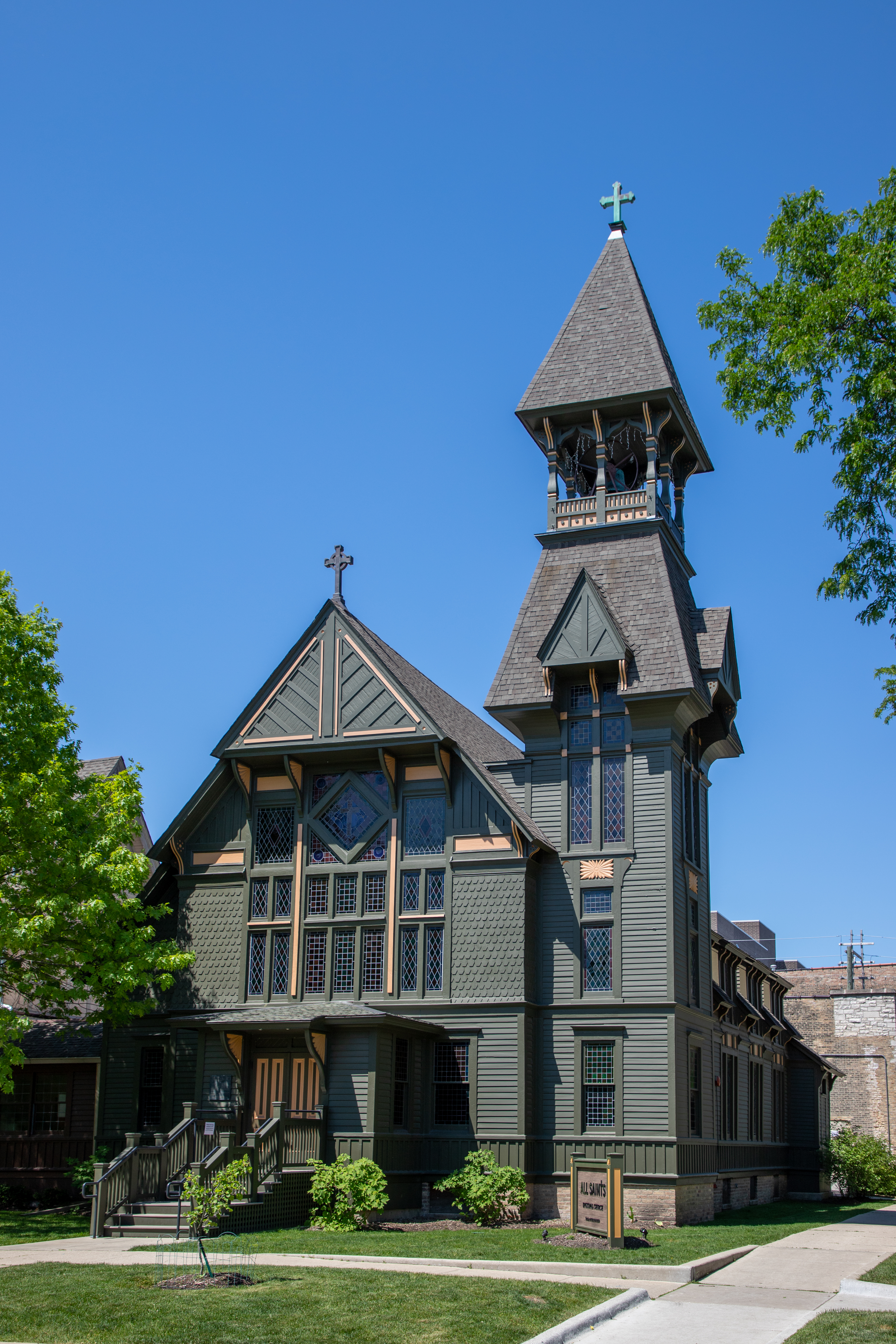
- All Saints Episcopal Church

- Location within Chicago Location within Illinois Location within the United States

Religion
- Affiliation: Episcopal
- Province: 5
- Region: United States
- Leadership: The Rev’d E. Suzanne Wille, Rector The Rev’d Courtney Reid, Associate Rector
- Status: Active

Location
- Location: 4550 North Hermitage Avenue; Chicago, Illinois, United States
- State: Chicago
- Coordinates: 41°57′54″N 87°40′22″W

Architecture
- Architect: John C. Cochrane
- Style: Stick style
- Completed: 1883

Specifications
- Capacity: ~200
- Spire: 1
- Chicago Landmark
- Official name: All Saints Church and Rectory
- Designated: December 27, 1982

Website
- http://www.allsaintschicago.org/

All Saints Episcopal Church (or All Saints) is a church of the Episcopal Church of the United States at 4550 North Hermitage Avenue in the Ravenswood neighborhood of Chicago, Illinois. Built in 1883, the structure was declared a Chicago Landmark in 1982. All Saints organizes community outreach programs that include a food pantry and events.

== History ==
The church was designed by architect John C. Cochrane and built in 1883 at the corner of Wilson and Hermitage Avenues. Previously, the congregation gathered in a nearby Methodist church. The building was created in stick style as shown by the use of vertical beams and decorative shingles and continues to be a rare example of stick style architecture in the city, in addition to being Chicago's oldest wood-frame church. Wood was likely used because other available materials, such as stone, were too expensive. Furthermore, the church's location was outside of Chicago's city limits, where wood construction was not permitted after the Great Chicago Fire in 1871. The stained glass windows were originally designed by the Healy & Millet firm. John Hulla designed the adjoining rectory in 1905 in a Tudor Revival style. The congregation intended to demolish and replace the sanctuary in the early 1900s, however the Great Depression stalled their plan.

The church community flourished through the 1950s but in 1960, attendance began to dwindle and by 1992, the church was in danger of being shuttered, despite being declared a city landmark only ten years earlier. At that time, the congregation's membership was reported to be only about 30, but increased interest and attendance since 1992 prevented the closure of the church. The church's attendance has continued to grow, and some sources have noted that All Saints could be considered the "fastest growing Episcopal congregation in Chicago." In 1992, a renovation plan for the church began and was completed in 2016 with a $2 million renovation plan to address structural issues with the church and restore its exterior design.

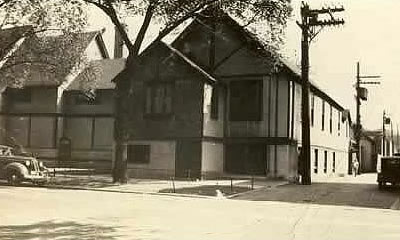
All Saints Episcopal Church in early 20th century

The church was recognized with the Richard H. Driehaus Foundation Preservation Award in 2017.

== Church and community services ==
The church offers several morning services on Sundays which either follow a low church or broad church format. In addition, the church partners with Ravenswood Community Services (RCS) to provide outreach and aid to disadvantaged members of the community. The church kitchen operates a weekly food pantry with the help of volunteers from both RCS and the congregation, and has sometimes catered to as many as 400 individuals in one night.

== Special events ==
All Saints has been noted for some events that deviate from typical Sunday services. One such special service in the Fall is an annual pet blessing, where members of the congregation are invited to bring their pets to church to receive blessings. In 2010, the service included 74 dogs, 13 cats, one rabbit, one lizard, and several other animals. The Day of the Dead is celebrated along with All Saints' Day in a single service. A New Orleans-style brass band is invited to process into the church and accompanies the choir during this service.

== References in literature ==
Poet Carl Sandburg was believed to be one of early congregants of All Saints. One of his poems, entitled Onion Days, describes a produce seller named Jasper in the following manner:

Jasper belongs to an Episcopal church in Ravenswood and on certain Sundays
He enjoys chanting the Nicene Creed with his daughters on each side of him joining their voices with his.

Sandberg is thought to be referring to All Saints in this particular passage, as it was the only Episcopal church in Ravenswood.
