= Henry Lischer House =

Historic house in Iowa, United States

- U.S. Historic district – Contributing property
- Davenport Register of Historic Properties
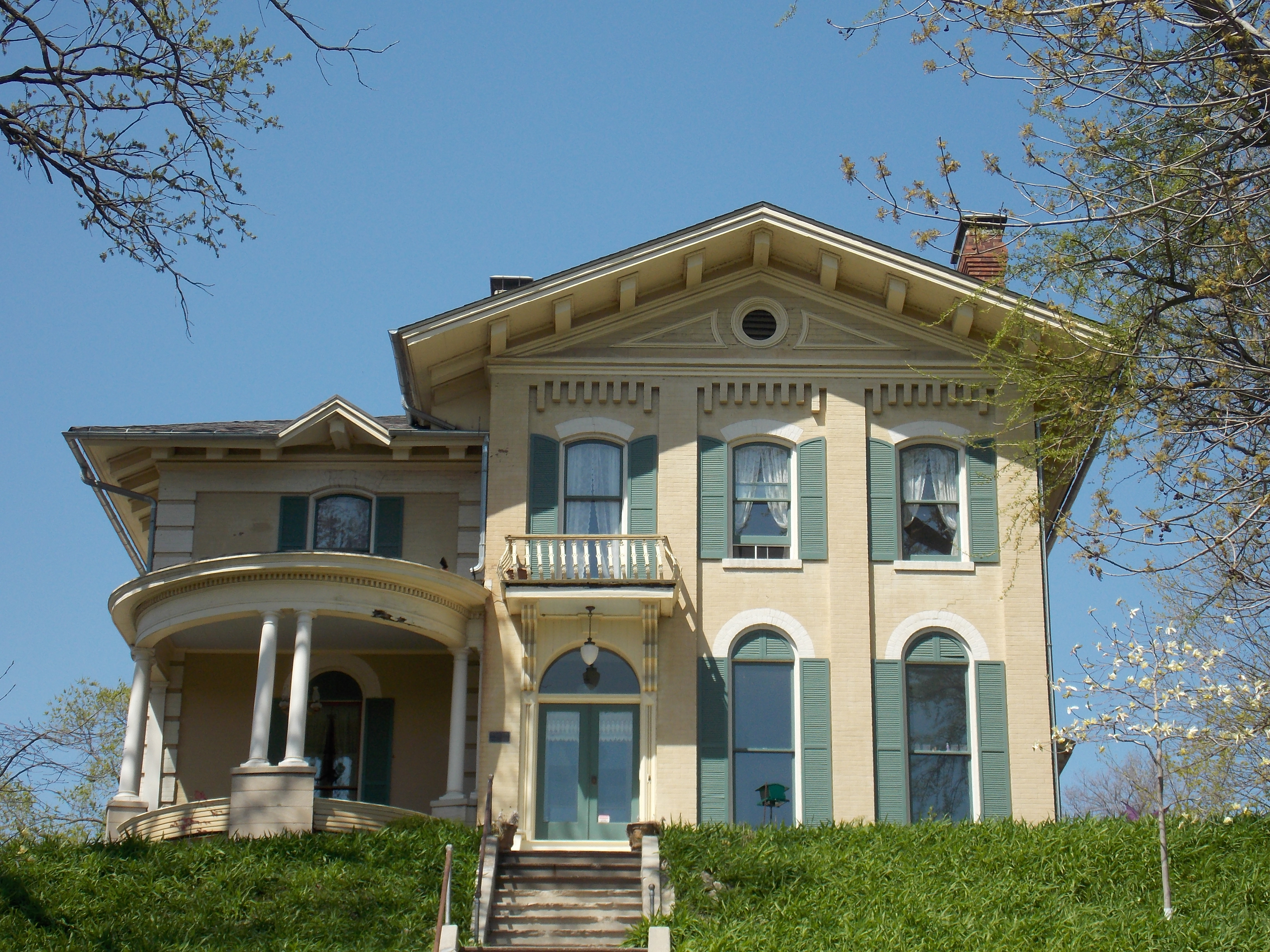

- Location within Iowa Location within the United States
- Location: 624 W. 6th St. Davenport, Iowa
- Coordinates: 41°31′33″N 90°34′56″W
- Area: less than one acre
- Built: c. 1870
- Built by: Frank Kurk; Frank Noe
- Architect: W.L. Carroll
- Architectural style: Italian Villa
- Part of: Hamburg Historic District (ID83003656)
- MPS: Davenport MRA
- DRHP No.: 6

Significant dates
- Added to NRHP: November 18, 1983
- Designated DRHP: January 6, 1993

The Henry Lischer House is a historic building located in the Hamburg Historic District in Davenport, Iowa, United States. The district was added to the National Register of Historic Places in 1983. The house was individually listed on the Davenport Register of Historic Properties in 1993.

== Henry Lischer ==
The home is associated with Henry Lischer, the owner and publisher of one of Davenport's German-language newspapers, Der Demokrat. The paper was founded by Theodor Gülich in November 1851. Lischer and his partner, Theodor Olshausen, bought the paper in 1856. Both were German immigrants who became newspapermen in St. Louis, Missouri. At its inception the paper was aligned with the political philosophy, and financial support, of the Democratic Party. However, it was a “free paper” that was not beholden to party doctrines and supported the right of freedom and human rights. It began to support the positions of the Republican Party. It was opposed to slavery and printed a supportive obituary to abolitionist John Brown. Lischer and Olshausen left Davenport in 1860 to return to St. Louis where they took over the Westliche Post. The new owners of Der Demokrat experienced financial problems as a result of their radical views and the economic downturn as a result of the American Civil War. Lischer, who still had a financial interest in the paper, returned to Davenport and became its sole owner for the next 40 years. After the Civil War, editorials in the paper fought the prohibition of alcohol, which was supported by the Republican Party. Even after the state of Iowa successfully passed prohibition laws in 1882, Scott County remained defiant with the support of the paper. Lischer's sons continued their father's work after his death.

== House ==
The Italian Villa style house was designed by Davenport architect W.L. Carroll. Contracts for construction were let in 1868 to Frank Kurk as the contractor and Frank Noe for the brickwork. It sits high on a bluff above the street. In 1874 Lischer and his son-in-law and next door neighbor Frederick G. Clausen built the stone wall and the staircases that led from the sidewalk to their respective residences.
