= Frank & John Bredow House =

- U.S. Historic district – Contributing property
- Davenport Register of Historic Properties
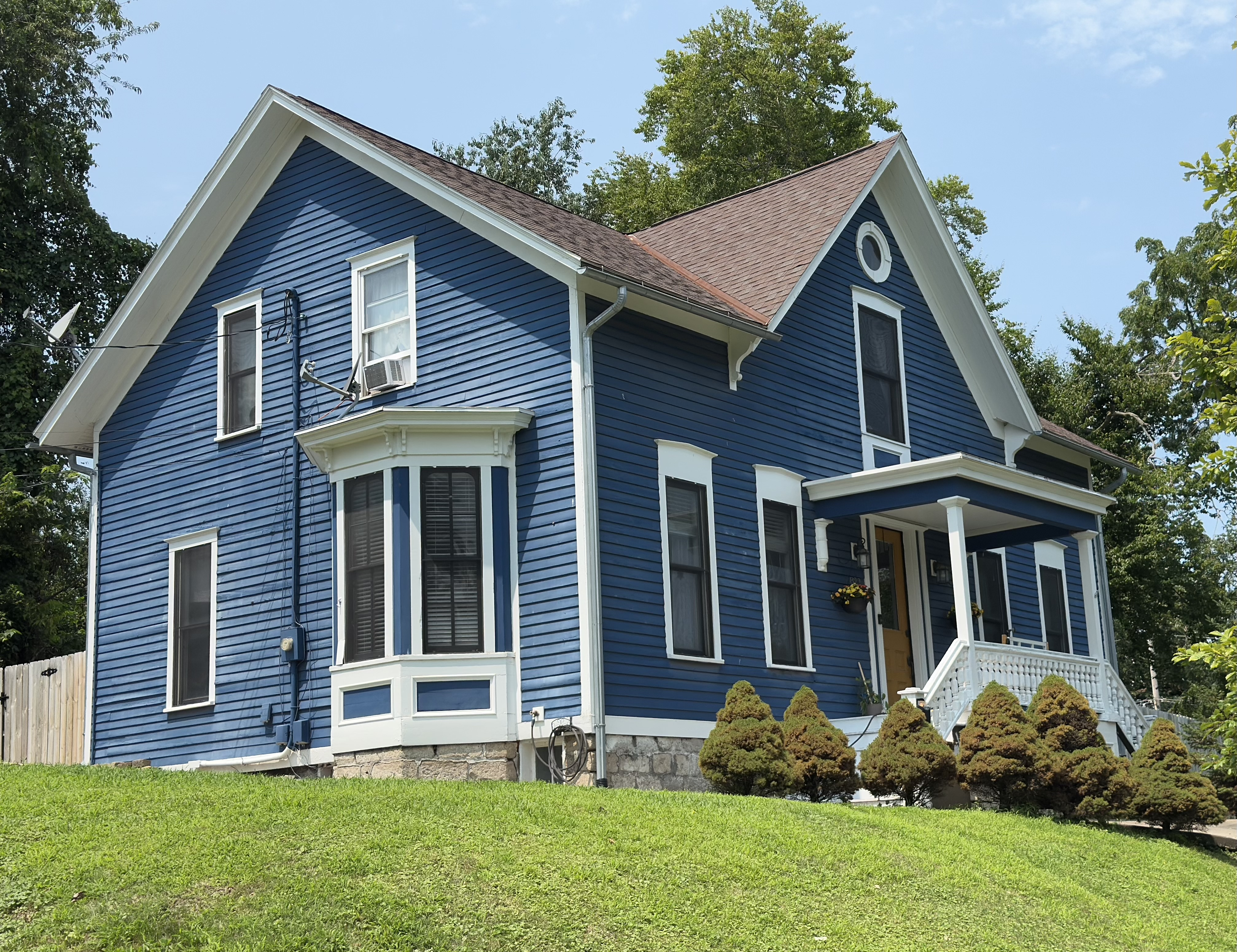

- Location within Iowa Location within the United States
- Location: 822 Gaines St. Davenport, Iowa
- Coordinates: 41°31′43″N 90°35′0″W
- Area: less than one acre
- Built: c. 1876
- Architectural style: Greek Revival
- Part of: Hamburg Historic District (ID83003656)
- MPS: Davenport MRA
- DRHP No.: 33

Significant dates
- Designated CP: November 18, 1983
- Designated DRHP: February 2, 2000

The Frank & John Bredow House is a historic building located in the Hamburg Historic District in Davenport, Iowa, United States. The district was added to the National Register of Historic Places in 1983. The house was individually listed on the Davenport Register of Historic Properties in 2000.

== History ==
John T. and Anna Bredow were both born in Schleswig-Holstein in 1825. Their eldest son, John F., was born there in 1853. The family immigrated to Kiel, Wisconsin about the same time. Their sons Frank and Gerhard were born in Wisconsin. In 1870 the family moved to Davenport, where John T. operated a tavern. He built the family home on Gaines Street around 1876. His son John F. married Bertha Krieger in 1883 they had a daughter, Rhoda, who was born the following year. The three lived with John T. and Anna in the house on Gaines Street. The other sons had moved elsewhere. John F. worked for the German Savings Bank for 25 years. He became president of Iowa Mantle Manufacturing Co. and then president of Hydraulic Concrete Construction Co.

The elder Bredow died around 1896, and John F. and his family continued to live in the house until 1920 when they moved to West Fourth Street. At some point, after they moved the house, it was divided into apartments. By 2005 the house had been vacant for 20 years; it was boarded up, part of its roof was missing and it was slated for demolition by the city. Volunteers from the Gateway Redevelopment Group and the Davenport HAPPEN program renovated the structure into a single-family home.
