= Dr. Heinrich Matthey House =

Historic house in Iowa, United States

- U.S. Historic district – Contributing property
- Davenport Register of Historic Properties
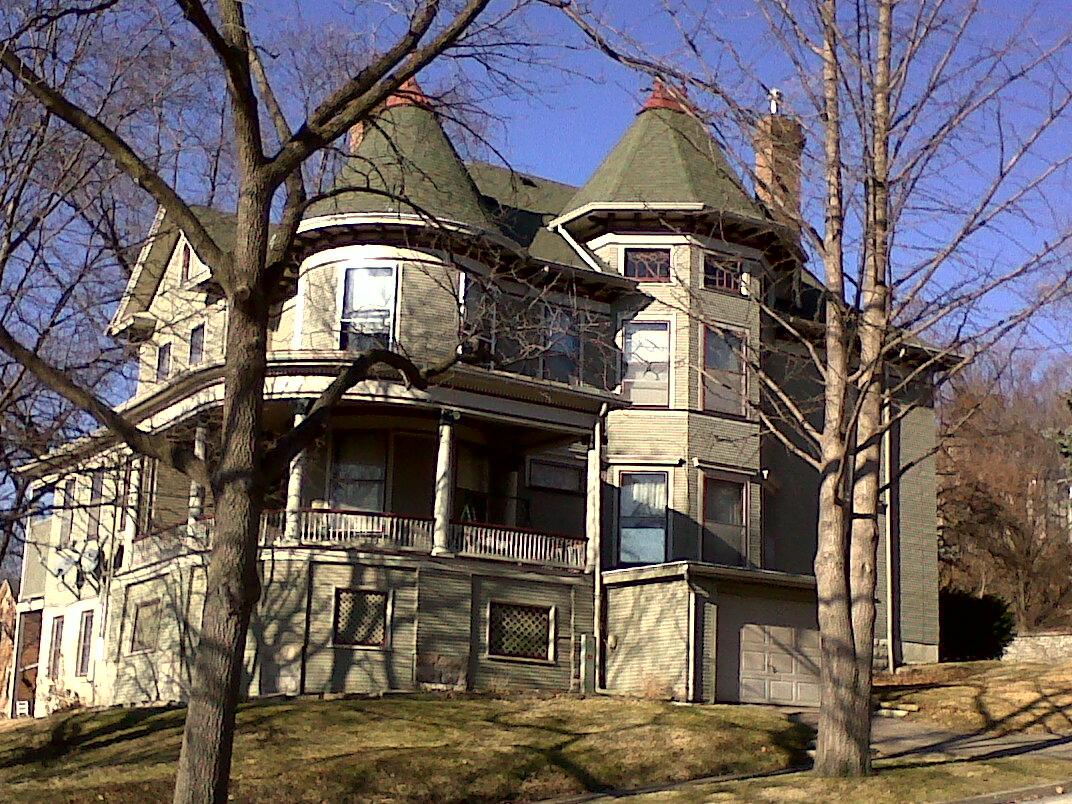

- Location within Iowa Location within the United States
- Location: 505 W. 6th St. Davenport, Iowa
- Coordinates: 41°31′32″N 90°34′49″W
- Area: less than an acre
- Built: 1900
- Architectural style: Georgian Revival
- Part of: Hamburg Historic District (ID83003656)
- MPS: Davenport MRA
- DRHP No.: 5

Significant dates
- Added to NRHP: November 18, 1983
- Designated DRHP: January 6, 1993

The Dr. Heinrich Matthey House is a historic building located in the Hamburg Historic District in Davenport, Iowa, United States. The district was added to the National Register of Historic Places in 1983. The house was individually listed on the Davenport Register of Historic Properties in 1993.

== Dr. Heinrich Matthey ==
The home is associated with Davenport physician Heinrich Matthey. He and his twin brother Carl were born on October 20, 1852, to Heinrich and Emilie (Kuntz) Matthey in Prussia. When he was 21, Heinrich immigrated to Milwaukee, Wisconsin with his parents in 1873. They moved to Davenport three years later. Matthey joined his father in publishing the Sternan Banner. In 1880 he moved to Sterling, Illinois where he published the Sterling Beobachter. After two years he sold the paper and returned to Germany, where he studied medicine in Leipzig and Würzburg, graduating in 1887. His brother Carl, who had stayed in Germany to study medicine, moved to Davenport and set up his medical practice. Heinrich returned to Davenport upon the completion of his studies and set up his practice. The two brothers merged their practices in 1889. The following year Heinrich married Hilda Mueller, daughter of lumber baron Chris Mueller, and they raised two children. Heinrich spent two terms on the local school board.

== Architecture ==
The Matthey house is located a block away from Hilda's parents and even closer to her three brothers. It architecturally embraces a transitional style that combines the Georgian and Colonial Revival styles with elements of the Queen Anne style. The Georgian Revival features include the rectangular form, a high hipped roof, a Palladian window in the dormer, a symmetrical front with the entrance on the right and a columned porch. On the east side of house is a projecting window bay and a tower on the southeast corner of the house that are reminiscent of the Queen Anne style.
