= Near East Side Historic District =

Historic district in Wisconsin, United States

- U.S. National Register of Historic Places
- U.S. Historic district
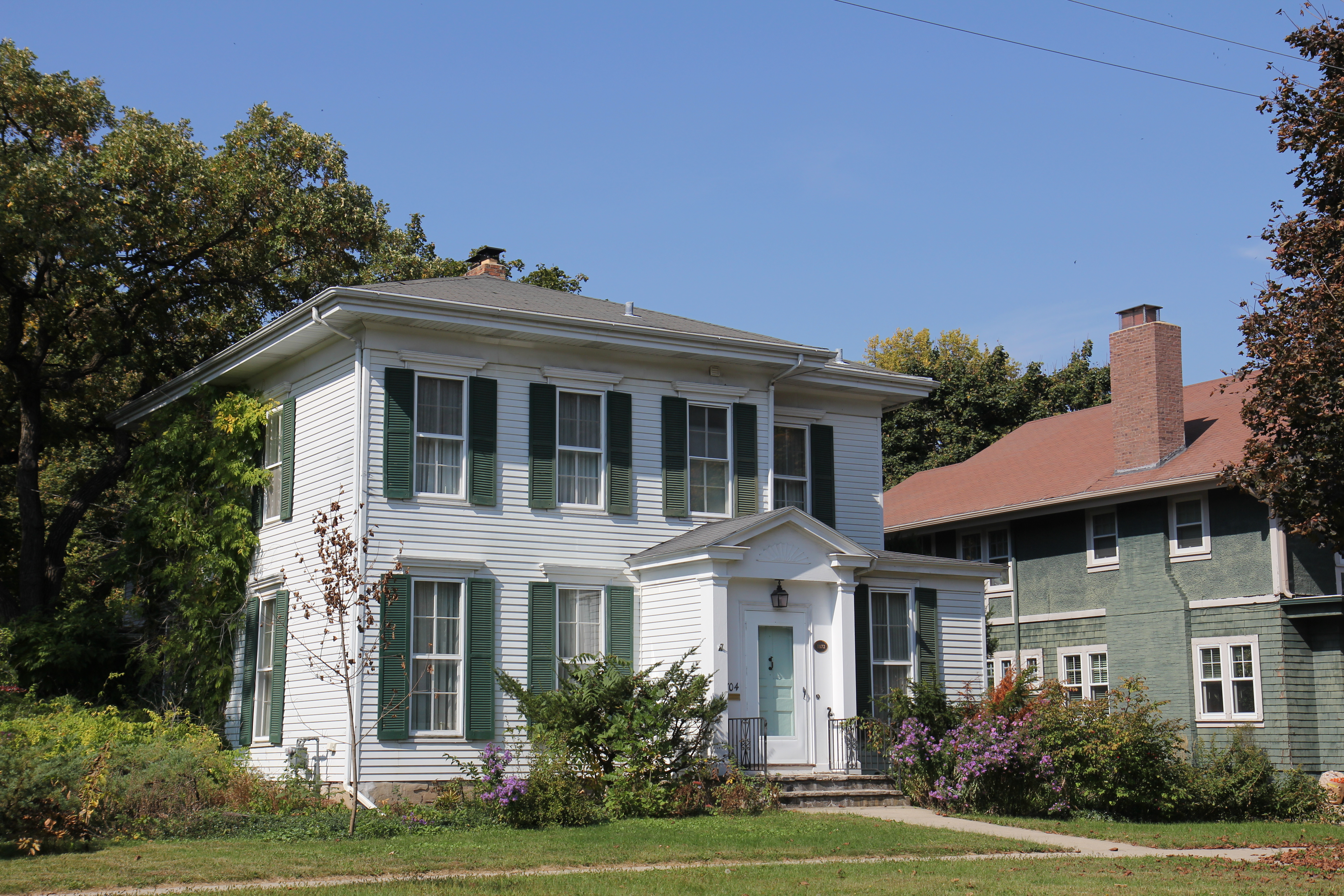
- 704 Park Street
- Location: Beloit, Wisconsin
- NRHP reference No.: 83003419
- Added to NRHP: January 7, 1983

The Near East Side Historic District is a neighborhood in Beloit, Wisconsin composed of stylish homes of prominent citizens from the 1800s and the buildings of Beloit College. It was added to the National Register of Historic Places in 1983.

This district's land is part of the claim of Caleb Blodgett, Beloit's first permanent settler. The 1837 Kelsou Survey and the 1840 Hopkins Survey laid out the streets and lots. Here are some sites that the NRHP nomination considers pivotal, roughly in the order built. These buildings show the same general progression of architectural styles that is found all over southern Wisconsin.

- Beloit College Mound Group is a collection of mounds built by Woodland people forty feet above the Rock River, probably between 700 and 1100 A.D. About 23 of 27 mounds remain, including a turtle effigy, linear, and conical mounds.
- Middle College at 700 College St was originally a 4-story Greek Revival-styled building designed by a Mr. Ross and built in 1848. It had flat stone lintels and was built from red brick made by Asa Curtis in nearby Turtle township. After a series of upgrades, a 1939 remodeling removed the fourth story and added the grand front portico and the cupola. The building initially housed classrooms, dormitory, chapel and library, and was called simply "the College." Only after North and South College were added was it called Middle College.
- The Rasey house at 517 Prospect St is a 1.5-story house built in 1850 as a fund-raiser for Beloit College – built with donated labor and materials. The style is roughly Greek Revival, seen in the low-pitched roof, the frieze beneath the eaves, and the plain lintels. The walls are clad in small coursed cobblestones, with quoins decorating the corners. The college's first president lived in the house for a year before it was sold to Deacon Samuel Hinman.
- The Aaron Chapin house at 709 College Ave, a.k.a. the President's House, is a 2-story house designed by Lucas Bradley in Greek Revival style house and built in 1851. Hallmarks of the style are the symmetry and the low-pitched roof. The house already had some Italianate elements at the start, but in 1871 Chapin added the bay windows and a cupola. In 1937 Ellen Chapin gave the house to Beloit College and it was remodeled, restoring it to a more Greek Revival look, finally adding the portico in the late 1940s. Chapin was the first president of the college, a teacher and writer on economics.
- The Jesse McQuigg house at 635 College Ave is a 1.5-story brick home built before 1857, and is considered by some "the best preserved, example of Greek Revival architecture in Beloit." All the classic elements are intact: low-pitched roof, cornice returns, frieze, and simple lintels. Jesse McQuigg owned the house from 1857 to 1886. The house's history before that is unknown.
- North College at 608 Emerson St is a 3-story dormitory designed by Lucas Bradley in Greek Revival style and built in 1854, with pilastered walls of red brick from Asa Curtis's kiln nearby, with a low-pitched hip roof. It originally looked somewhat different, but the architrave, frieze and the pedimented portico were added in 1940 to make this building look more like Middle College. It served as a dormitory for men until 1891, then was used as classrooms until 1930, then a dorm for women until the 1950s. After that it housed an infirmary and offices.
- The Whitney house (pictured above) at 704 Park Ave is a 2-story frame home built in 1855. Italianate influence shows in the low-pitched hip roof, the massing, and the decorative lintels above the windows.
- The Charles Parker house at 231 Roosevelt is a 2-story frame Italianate-styled house built in 1856 on the bluff above the Rock River, with a low-pitched hip roof, wide eaves supported by paired brackets, and a cupola on top. Parker was a principal of the Parker and Stone Reaper Company, which produced the Appleby Twine Binder. Parker was also a founder of the Beloit Water Company in 1885.
- South College, at 700 College Ave, is a 2-story cream brick chapel designed by Lucas Bradley and built around 1858. It is a simplified version of a building Bradley proposed for Racine High School. Initially the first floor housed the Academy and the second the chapel, but since 1889 the building has served various functions.
- The Thomas Bailey house at 824 Church St is a 2-story frame house built in 1858 with Gothic Revival stylings: the steeply pitched roof, the tall windows, and the scroll-sawed bargeboards. The emphasis on vertical in places makes one think of a country church. Bailey was a produce merchant and grain dealer.
- The Elijah Kendall house at 818 Church St is a 2-story Italianate-style house built in 1860. It has a low-pitched roof with broad eaves supported by brackets. Elijah Kendall was a carpenter, who lived there with patternmaker Eugene Kendall and blacksmith Hubert Kendall.
- Memorial Hall on Beloit College's campus at 615 Prospect Ave was designed by Cochrane and Garnsey of Chicago and built in 1867. The WHS survey considers it "one of the finest extant examples of Victorian Gothic architecture in Beloit." Hallmarks of Gothic Revival style in this building are the point-topped arches, the steep roof surfaces, and the cresting on the ridges. It initially housed mementos from the Civil War. Since then it has housed the college's library, the music department, the natural history collection, and now the Logan Museum of Anthropology.
- The Richard Newcomb house at 905 Bushnell St (the NE corner of Horace White Park) is a frame Italianate-style house built in 1869. It has a low-pitched roof supported by paired brackets and framed by symmetric chimneys, a full-width front porch topped with a balustrade, and tall, symmetric windows with elegant hood moulds.
- The Sereno Merrill house at 703 Park Ave is a large frame Italian Villa style house built in 1869. The form is asymmetric and picturesque, with a 3-story corner tower. Ionic columns flank the front entry. Merrill was the principal of Beloit Seminary until it merged with Beloit College. Then he built a paper mill in Rockton, patented a paper machine, and started the O.E. Merrill Company to make parts for his paper-making machines. In 1873 he helped organize Eclipse windmill Company. He also served as president of several banks, alderman, Wisconsin assemblyman, and in other civic roles.
- The John Holmes house at 1103–1105 Chapin St is a 1.5-story Second Empire-style house built in 1875. The mansard roof is the distinguishing feature of Second Empire style. This roof is shingled with slate. Below the roof, the walls are cream brick, with a rather elaborate frieze and windows heads consistent with the overall style. Holmes was a surveyor, farmer, builder, and trader. He was Secretary and Treasurer of Beloit Savings Bank and held offices in his Presbyterian church.
- The Anna Pratt house at 726 Church St is a 2.5-story Queen Anne house built in 1890. Typical for the style, it has a complex roof line, a corner turret, bargeboards, and careful attention to varied surface textures, with fish-scale shingles on the second story, narrow clapboard below, and an interesting waffle pattern in the gable ends of the front porch.
- Eaton Chapel at 720 College St was designed by Patton and Fisher and built in 1891 – a Richardsonian Romanesque-style structure with a large tapered bell tower. Hallmarks of the style are the round-topped openings, the off-center tower producing a picturesque silhouette, and the rusticated stone, though the Richardsonian flavor more commonly limits rusticated stone to lower parts of a structure.
- Pearsons Hall of Science at 504 Emerson St is an instructional building of Beloit College, built in 1891–92. It was designed by Burnham and Root of Chicago in Romanesque Revival style. A hallmark of the style in this building is the round-arched tops on many openings. The building marked an expansion of science education at the school, supported partly by a $60,000 grant from Dr. D.K. Pearsons of Chicago. Roy Chapman Andrews and Erastus G. Smith taught in the building.
- The Moses Reitler house at 925 Bushnell St is a 3-story house built in 1892, with two gable-roofed wings and a polygonal tower. A conventional Queen Anne/Eastlake-style porch shelters the front door, but above that are simply decorated enclosed porches on the second and third story. The house is clad in a variety of shingle patterns. The shingles and tower are Queen Anne-style features, but the simplicity of design draws from Shingle style. Moses Reitler was a German Jew who sold clothing in Beloit. His son Eugene owned the house after him.
- The Charles and Della Emerson house at 732 Church St is a 2.5-story Queen Anne-styled house built in 1894, with the typical complex roof, asymmetric front porch, and shingles in the gable ends. Atypical of Queen Anne are the concentric shingle pattern in the gable ends and the small columns supporting the front porch. Charles owned Emerson's Drug Store.
- The Paley house at 802 Park Ave is a 2.5-story house built in 1895. With a round corner tower, asymmetric wrap-around porch, bay windows, and shingles in the gable ends, it has many classic features of Queen Anne style. The concentric shingle pattern in the gable ends and the small columns supporting the porch are a bit odd for Queen Anne, but interestingly similar to the Emerson house above. John Paley was president of Beloit State Bank, and his wife and two daughters served as directors and cashiers.
- The Noble Ross house at 819 Park Ave is a 2.5-story Queen Anne house built in 1896 with a complex roof, a conical tower and varied windows and bays. Noble Ross was one of the founders of Beloit Iron Works, which made paper-making machines.
- The Carnegie Library at 634 College St on the Beloit College Campus was built in 1904, designed by Patton and Miller of Chicago – the "finest extant example in Beloit of the Classical Revival" style. Elements of that style in this building are the colossal Corinthian columns and pilasters and the heavy cornice. The building was started with a gift from Andrew Carnegie's foundation like other Carnegie libraries, this one amounting to $50,000. The building served as Beloit College's library until 1962 – since then as the World Affairs Center and offices.
- The William Hamilton house at 805 Church St is a later Queen Anne-style, 2.5 stories and built in 1905. The basic shape of the house is a cube, probably influenced by the American Foursquare style that was becoming popular, but the cube was decorated with a very Queen Anne-ish corner turret and asymmetric wrap-around porch. William Hamilton was a professor of Mathematics and Astronomy and Registrar at Beloit College, and pushed the college toward career-oriented programs.
- The G.M. Moss house at 636 Harrison is a 2.5-story house built in 1906, with the first story clad in shingles and the higher ones clad in stucco and ornamental half-timbering. The design draws from Prairie Style and Tudor Revival style. Moss was the secretary-treasurer of a wholesale grocery business.
- The Philhower house at 808 Park Ave is a 2.5-story house built in 1906, with Prairie Style showing in its emphasis on the horizontal – the broad eaves almost suggesting an Oriental pagoda. But the striking thing is the flat-topped piers rising from corners and through the roof surfaces. The first owner was grocer E.L. Philower.
- The Dr. Daniel Connell house at 816 Wisconsin Ave is a 2-story house built in 1913 with Prairie Style influence seen in the emphasis on horizontal, the wide eaves, bands of windows, and the stucco with rectangular trim. The tile roof also suggests Japanese architecture related to Prairie Style. The house was built for a Mrs. R. Watrous, then bought by surgeon Dr. Connell and his wife four years later.
- The Dazey house at 746 Park Ave is a 2-story house built in 1922. It mixes Craftsman style (exposed rafter tails and tapered columns alongside the door) with Prairie Style (emphasis on horizontal, rectangular subdivision, and bands of windows). C.A. Dazey, a local realtor and developer, built this house first in his Dazey's Subdivision.
