= Marshall County Courthouse (Iowa) =

- U.S. National Register of Historic Places
- U.S. Historic district – Contributing property
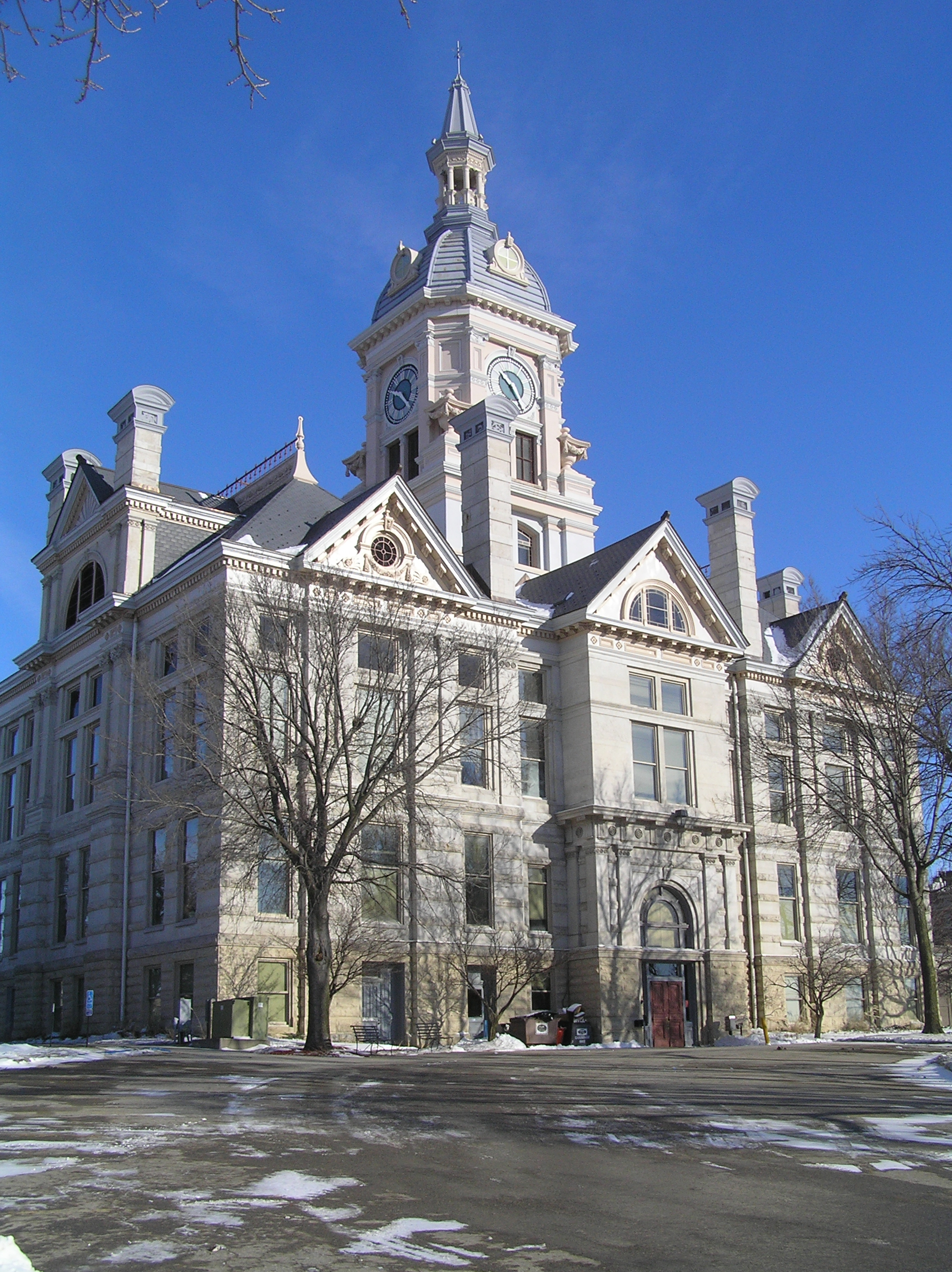
- The south elevation in 2007

- Location within Iowa Location within the United States
- Interactive map showing the location for Marshall County Courthouse
- Location: Courthouse Square; Marshalltown, Iowa
- Coordinates: 42°2′55″N 92°54′42″W
- Built: 1886
- Architect: John C. Cochrane
- Architectural style: Classical Revival
- Part of: Marshalltown Downtown Historic District (ID01001463)
- MPS: County Courthouses in Iowa TR (AD)
- NRHP reference No.: 72000478
- Added to NRHP: November 21, 1972

The Marshall County Courthouse is located in Marshalltown, Iowa, United States. The current building was completed in 1886 to replace an earlier building. The courthouse is a dominant landmark in downtown Marshalltown. It was individually listed on the National Register of Historic Places in 1972. In 2002 it was listed as a contributing property in the Marshalltown Downtown Historic District. It is the third building the county has used for a courthouse and county business.

== History ==
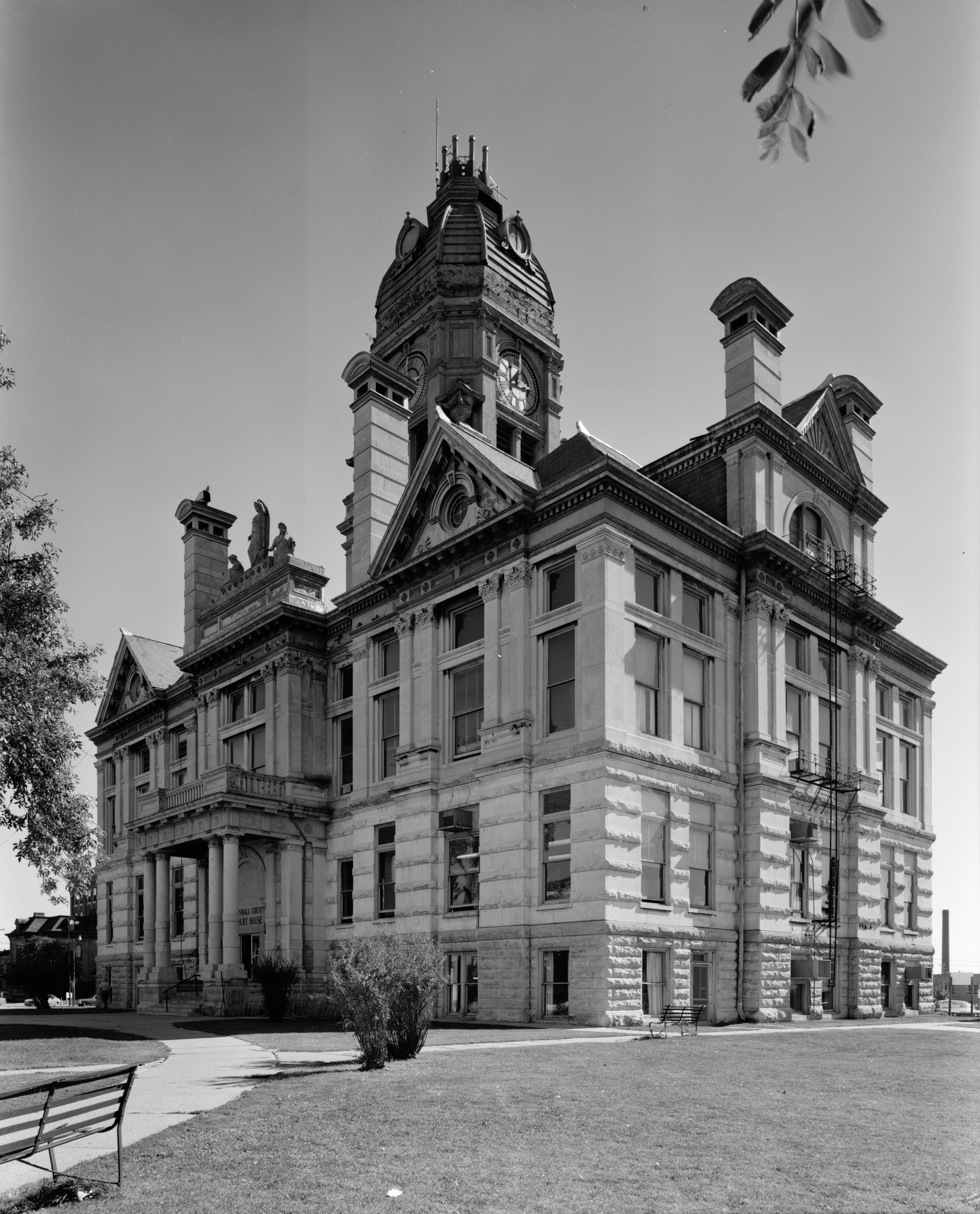
Marshall County Courthouse, September 1977

Initially, county business was carried out in the homes of county officials. The first county seat was Marietta, located a few miles northwest of Marshalltown, and the first courthouse was built there. The single-story frame structure measured 32 by 22 feet (9.8 by 6.7 m). It was sold for $175 when the county seat moved to Marshalltown.

The citizens of Marshall, as the town was then called, wanted the county seat moved there so they had a courthouse built free of charge. The two-story brick building with a stone foundation measured 60 by 40 feet (18 by 12 m), and was built by hundreds of people from the community. It was built facing the town square on its east side in 1858 and opened in 1860. County offices were on the first floor and the courtroom was on the second floor. By the mid-1870s it was in disrepair. Voters, however, rejected initial attempts to replace it.

In 1881 citizens of Marshall County voted for a $100,000 courthouse to be built on the public square in Marshalltown deeded by Henry Anson. David Wood Townsend contracted and oversaw the building of the new courthouse. The cornerstone of the new building was laid in 1884 and the new courthouse was dedicated in 1886.

The building was designed by John C. Cochrane, whose firm had designed the State Capitol Building in Des Moines. The courthouse was constructed using native limestone over brick. On November 21, 1972, the building had been placed on the National Register of Historic Places.

In 1973 the State Fire Marshall ordered the building repaired or removed. The Courthouse had been well maintained until the market crash of 1929. During the Great Depression and war years, taxpayers could not afford to pay for needed repairs, so the building began to deteriorate. The Friends of the Courthouse Committee, a newly formed organization, decided to save the building. A referendum was held and it was decided to restore the courthouse. In 1974 voters approved a $3.2 million bond issue to pay for the renovation. The renovated Courthouse was rededicated on November 19, 1978.

The courthouse was damaged in a tornado on July 19, 2018, which ripped the spire from the top of the building's cupola. The building also suffered water damage because of the storm. Initial repair costs of $15.5 million were raised to $30 million by June 2019. The increased costs include improvements to the building beyond the insurance-funded repairs. The dome was removed on May 13, 2019, for repairs and it was replaced by a temporary roof. On March 31, 2020, a new dome was lifted into place.

== Architecture ==
The 2½-story limestone structure is built on the raised basement of rusticated stone. The center pavilion projects from the main facade and extends beyond the roofline with three statues at the top. A portico with four columns rises to a balcony at the second story on the north elevation. Pedimented wall dormers surround the building at the roofline. A hip roof caps the structure. In the center is a high square limestone tower with a clock, dome, and small cupola at the top. It rises to a height to 175 feet (53 m). The interior features a rotunda with a dome, columns, terrazo floors, and carved woodwork. The courthouse is located in the center of the town square.
