= Cochrane and Garnsey =

American architectural firm

Cochrane and Garnsey was a Chicago, Illinois-based architectural firm. John C. Cochrane and George O. Garnsey were the principals.

Works:

- Memorial Hall of Beloit College; 615 Prospect Ave, Beloit, Wisconsin; Cochrane and Garnsey (1867); part of Near East Side Historic District
- Illinois State Capitol; Springfield, Illinois; primarily Alfred Piquenard (1868-1888); NRHP-listed
