= Hamburg Historic District (Davenport, Iowa) =

Historic district in Iowa, United States

- U.S. National Register of Historic Places
- U.S. Historic district
- Davenport Register of Historic Properties
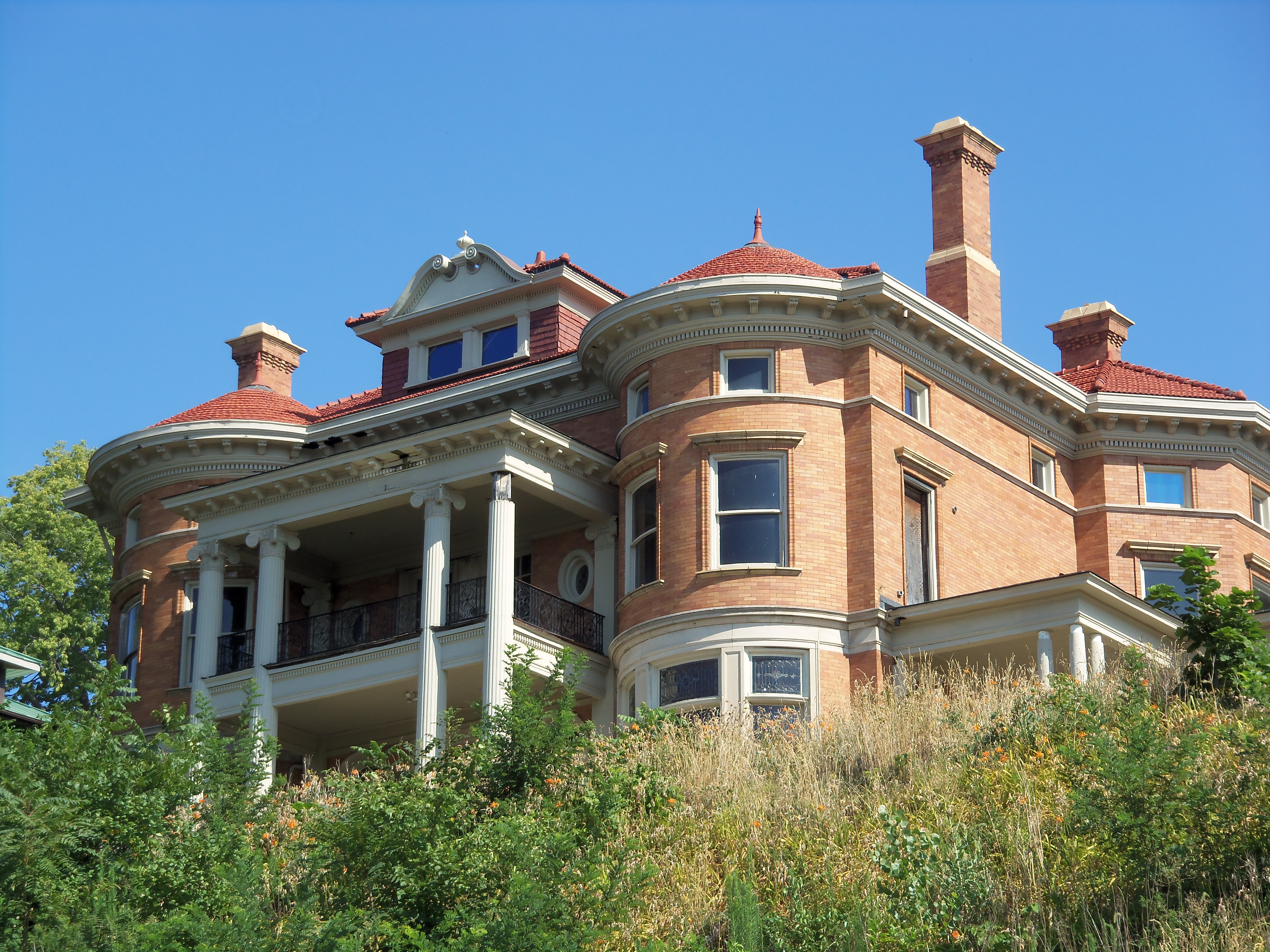
- Overview

- Location within Iowa Location within the United States
- Location: Roughly bounded by 5th, Vine, Ripley, and 9½ Streets, Davenport, Iowa
- Coordinates: 41°31′36″N 90°34′57″W
- Area: 79 acres (32 ha)
- Architect: Benjamin Aufderheide; Frederick G. Clausen; Gustav A. Hanssen; Deidrich J. Harfst; Thomas McClelland et al.
- Architectural style: Late Victorian
- MPS: Davenport MRA
- NRHP reference No.: 83003656; 100000541 (decrease)
- DRHP No.: 32

Significant dates
- Added to NRHP: November 18, 1983
- Boundary decrease: January 17, 2017
- Designated DRHP: November 1, 1999

The Hamburg Historic District, also known as the Gold Coast, is a residential neighborhood located on a bluff northwest of downtown Davenport, Iowa, United States. It is listed on the National Register of Historic Places in 1983. In 1999, it was listed on the Davenport Register of Historic Properties The historic district is where the city's middle and upper-income German community built their homes in the 19th and early 20th centuries. Germans were the largest ethnic group to settle in Davenport.

== Description ==
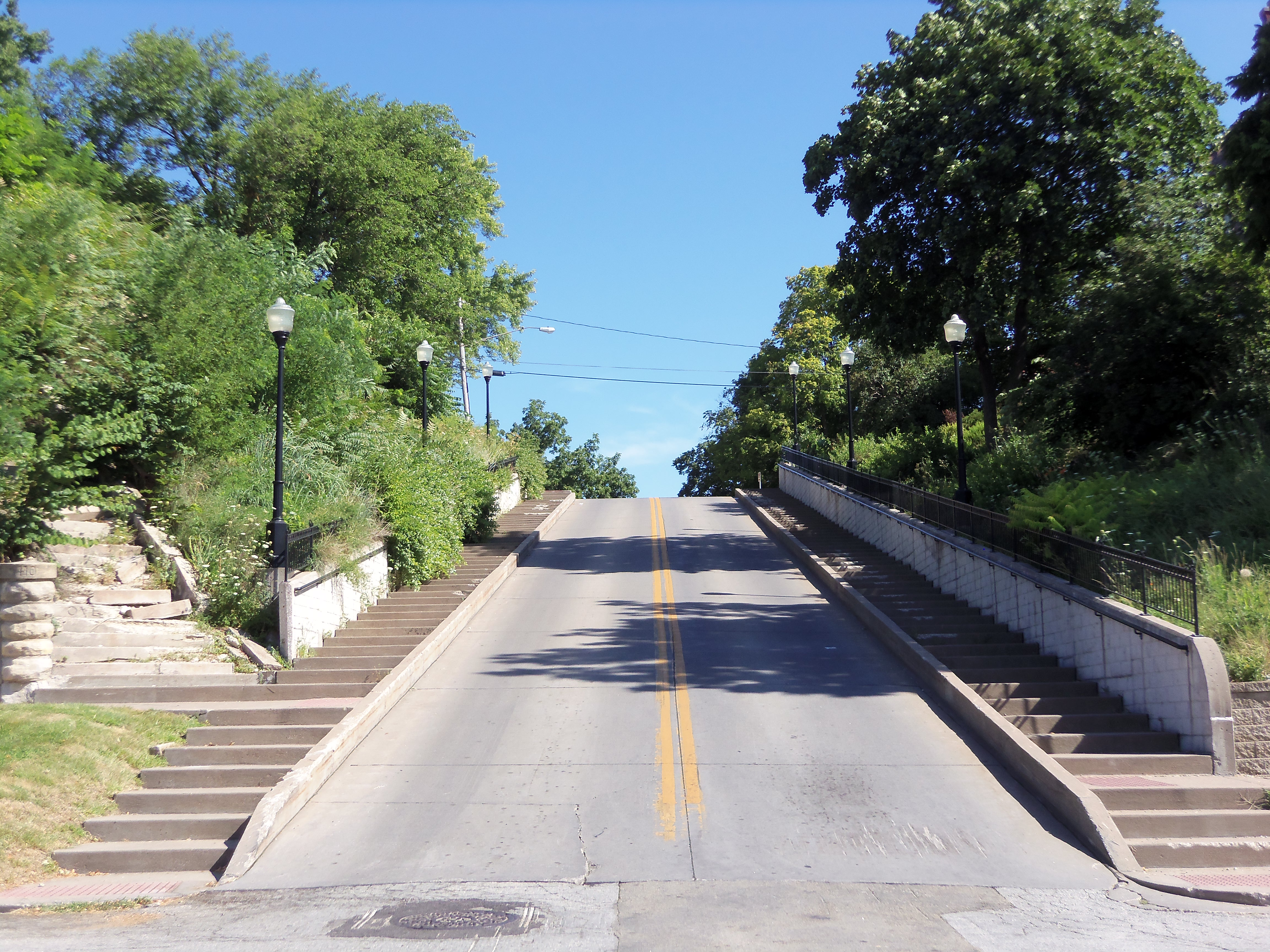
Ripley Street steps

Hamburg is located to the northwest of Davenport's central business district. The neighborhood itself goes as far north as Locust Street and to the west as far as Division Street. It includes the highest concentration of historic buildings and some of the best examples of architectural styles in the neighborhood. The Mississippi River is located five blocks to the south. There is a gradual slope to the land as one travels to the north. After the alley north of Fifth Street, it dramatically rises into a bluff. It peaks at about Seventh Street and descends less dramatically to Ninth Street. The southern part of this area provides a prominent view of the cityscape and the river. For this reason, it became a prime location for the middle and upper-income Germans who immigrated to Davenport to build their homes. The Chicago, Rock Island and Pacific Railroad tracks built along Fifth Street are yet another boundary for the area. The north side of Sixth Street (along the bluff line) that extends from Ripley Street to Gaines Street is known as the "Gold Coast."

At the time the historic district's boundaries were amended in 2017, it consisted of 312 resources, which included 229 contributing buildings, three contributing structures, and 80 non-contributing buildings. In 2017, the districts boundaries were decreased at its corners because of the number of demolitions that occurred in those areas since 1983. They were increased to include one adjacent property.

The period of significance was also established in 2017 as 1848 to 1926. Of the 219 properties in the district, 140 are two-story single-family residences with a few duplexes mixed in. A couple apartment buildings and commercial buildings are located along Gaines Street. Of the main buildings, 78 were built between 1848 and 1879, 72 built between 1880 and 1899, and 67 were built between 1900 and 1926. Nine were constructed after the period of significance from 1927 through 2016.

== History ==
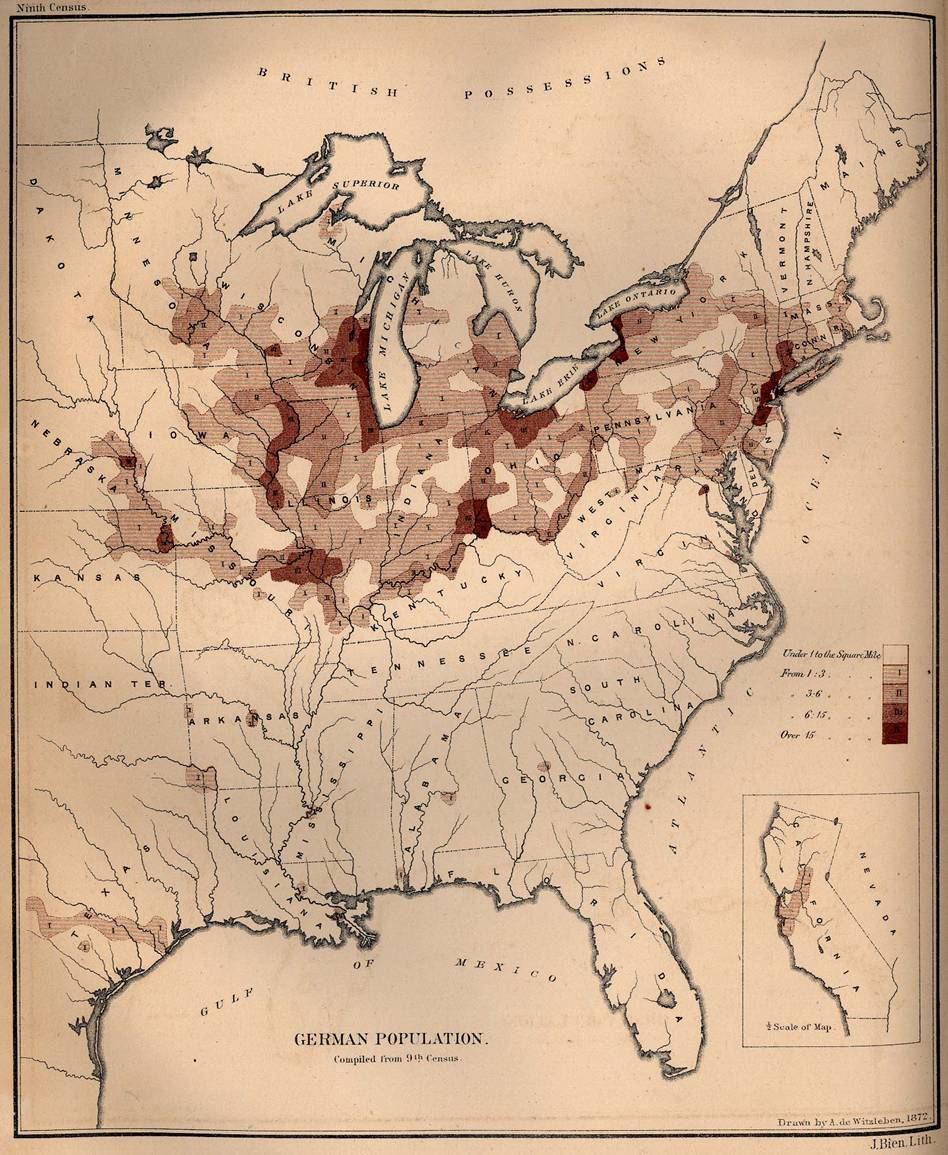
US German population in 1872. Davenport is in the center of the dark band along the Mississippi River in Eastern Iowa

German immigrants started moving into the city in noticeable numbers starting in the late 1840s. In 1848, 250 Germans came to Davenport and by 1850, that number rose to close to 3,000, or 20% of the city's population. German immigration remained strong through the 1880s. The Iowa census of 1890 showed that a quarter of Scott County's residents were natives of Germany. A disproportionate number of those immigrants came from Schleswig-Holstein, which was in a border and personal rights dispute with Denmark in the 1840s. German “free thinkers” from the two states were leaving in large numbers and many came to Davenport. Their political and philosophical thinking tended to be anti-clerical and secular. It would eventually dominate Davenport politics and set the city apart from communities of similar size in the Midwest. Other German immigrants to Davenport came from Bavaria, Hamburg, Hanover, and Mecklenburg. Davenport's small Hungarian community, refugees from the revolution against Austria in the 1840s, generally lived in the German neighborhoods, as well.

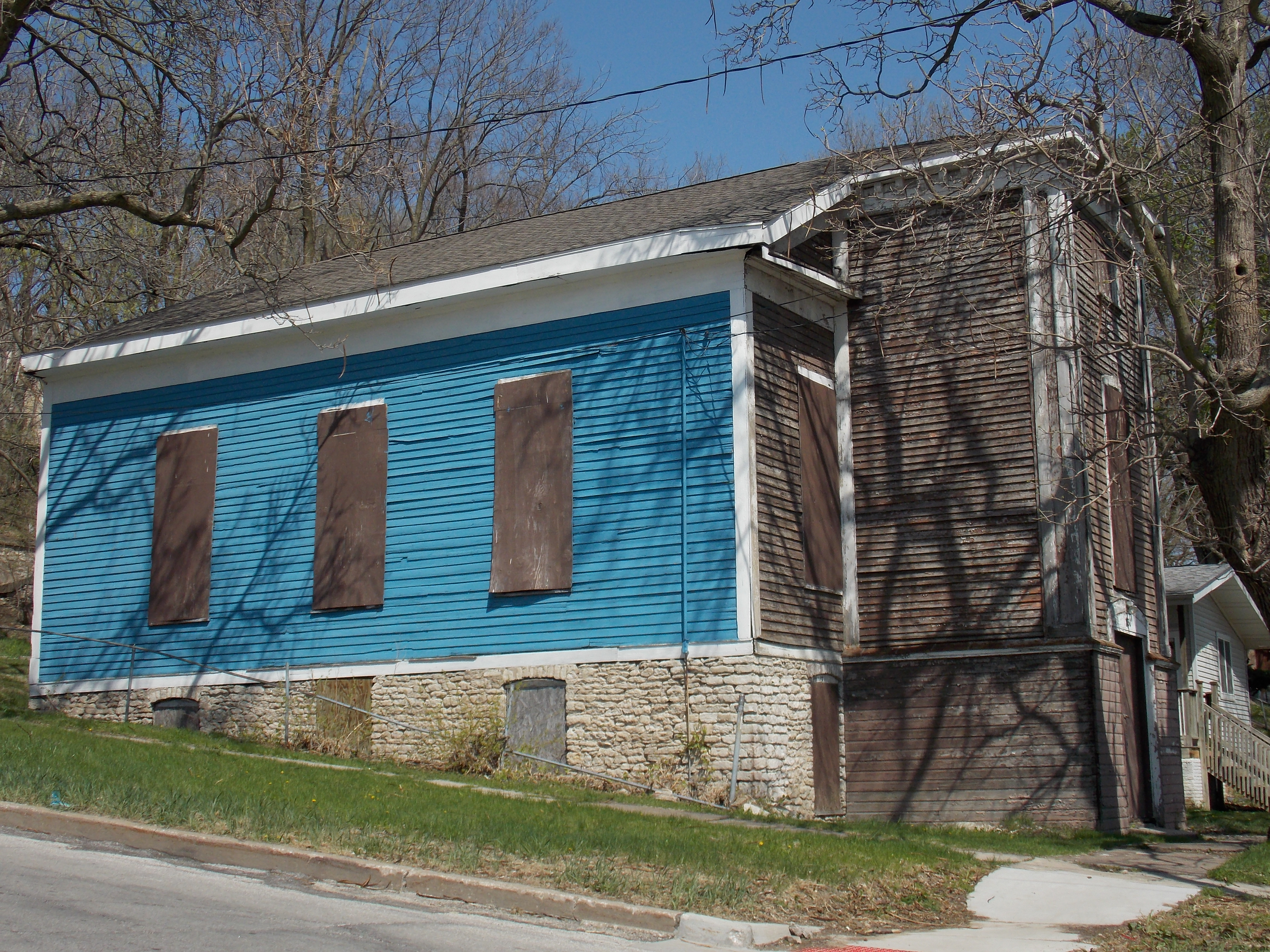
The former German Methodist Episcopal Church

Initially, the native-born citizens of Davenport resented the large numbers of Germans coming to the city and the influence they were asserting. They were also opposed to separate German societies, schools, cultural organizations, and events. Supporting the Temperance movement was one way opponents expressed anti-German sentiments. In 1855, the Know Nothing movement emerged with the goal of keeping local politics to native-born people. By the end of the Civil War, with the sons of both Germans and non-Germans dying for a common cause, there was a sense of acceptance even though the numbers of Germans coming into the city continued to increase.

Because of the size of Davenport's German population, their customs dominated the city's economic, cultural, and political life. Many of those who were leaders in civic life lived in the Hamburg District. The lower income Germans tended to live below the hill and above the factories along the Mississippi River. Their neighborhoods are collectively known as the West End, although they were not all German, and included the West Third Street Historic District. Harrison Street is generally the dividing line between the Germans on the west and the non-Germans on the east side. German influence in Davenport started to wane in the early decades of the 20th century, especially with the onset of World War I. The war, coupled with the younger generation's lack of a distinct German identity, led to the decline of German influence.

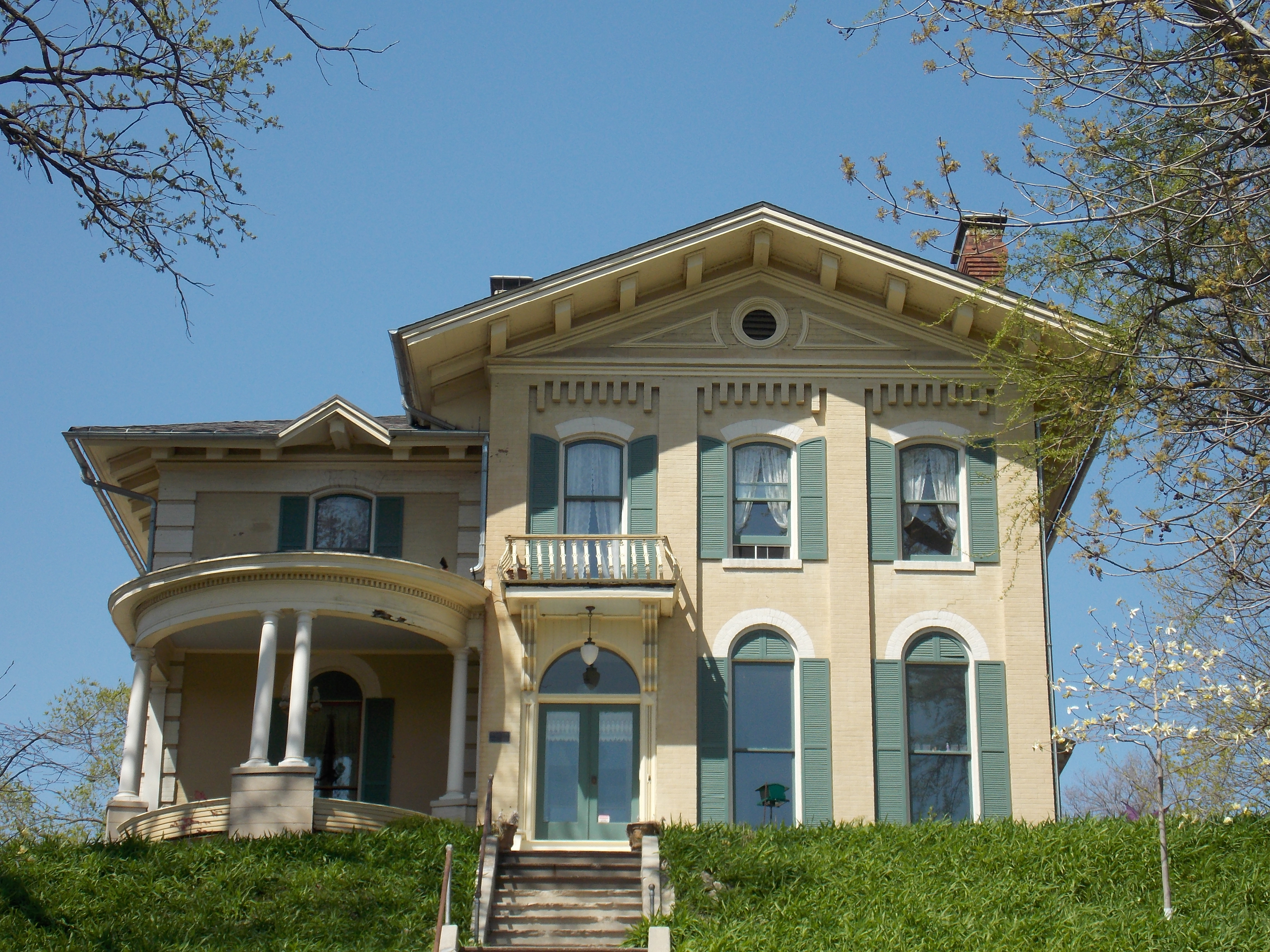
Henry Lischer House

Prominent Davenport citizens who lived in the Hamburg District included Henry Lischer, who published the influential German-language newspaper Der Demokrat; merchants August Steffen and his son August as well as F. Max D. Peterson, who was a partner in the J.H.C. Petersen's Sons' Store; brewers Henry Frahm and Henry Koehler; the Mueller's who owned a large lumber mill; H.H. Andressen who founded the German Savings Bank, which was later renamed American Commercial and Savings Bank; politician and German-American leader Hans Reimer Clausen; grocer Charles Beiderbecke; and financier William H. Weise. All of the above-named men had roots in Schleswig-Holstein, they built significant houses in the Hamburg District, and many of their children married a son or daughter from one of the other's families.

== Architecture ==
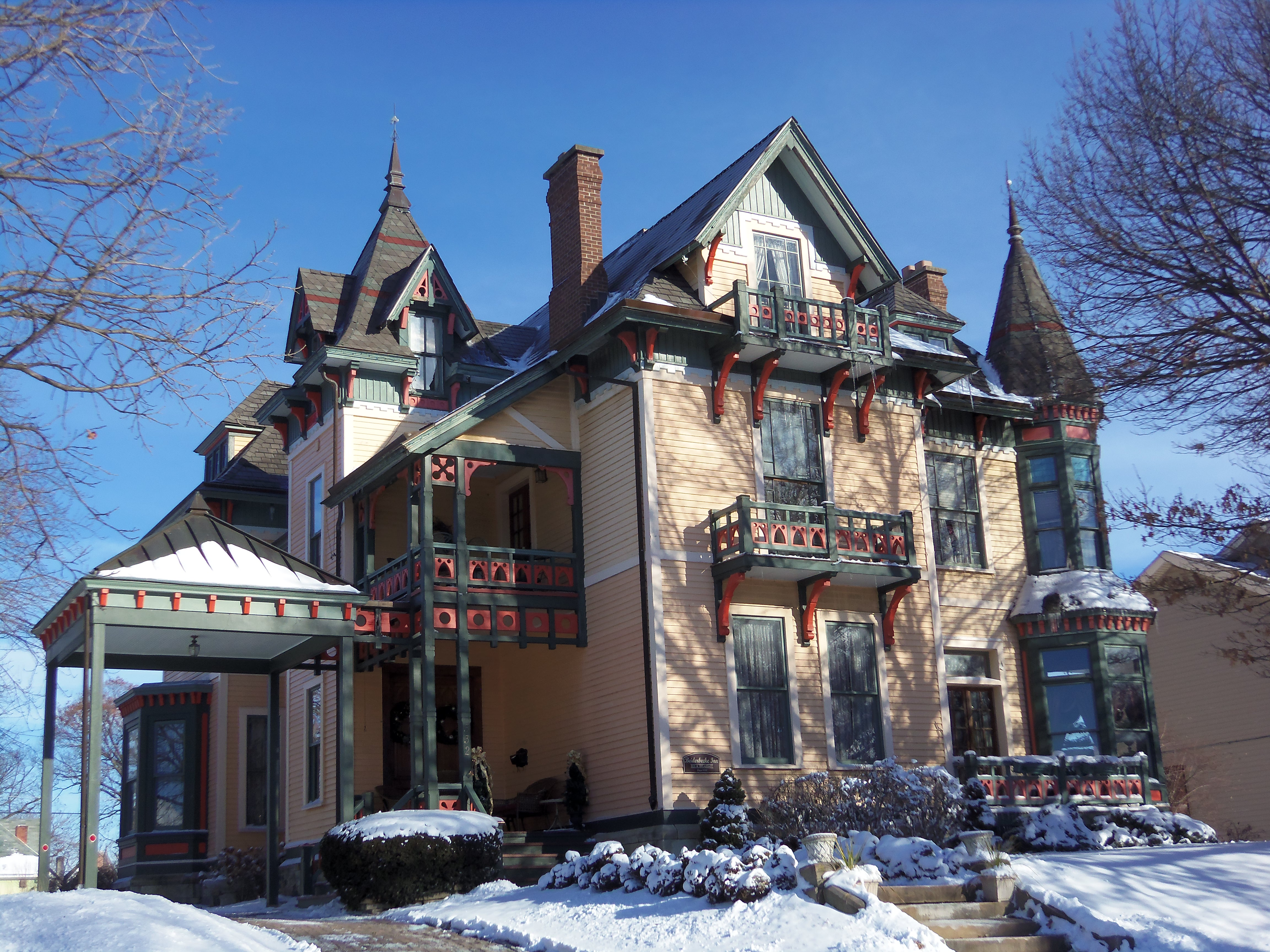
Charles Beiderbecke House

The geographical location of the Hamburg District is a fairly steep bluff north of the downtown area. The sidewalk on Ripley Street is replaced by steps as it climbs the hill. The area has the largest concentration of historically significant houses in Davenport. As with other areas of the city, the simple Greek Revival style was the first to appear in Hamburg. These homes are generally at the base of the hill. The style is realized in cottages and the more popular two-story, 3-bay front gable homes. Other homes in the district include large Victorian homes in the Gothic Revival, Second Empire, Italianate, and the Queen Anne styles built in the 19th century. Many of these homes crown the bluff and offer vistas overlooking the river valley below. There are also examples of early 20th century Georgian Revival and American Craftsman homes. The historic district is rounded out by smaller and more simple late 19th and early 20th century homes and a few modern dwellings.

The Hamburg Historic District is largely a residential area today. Institutional architecture that existed has largely been torn down or converted to residential use. One such building on West Seventh Street was built for Iowa College, which moved from the area in the 1850s to the present College Square Historic District. The former German Methodist Episcopal Church remains on West Sixth Street, while Zion and Trinity Lutheran Churches built new buildings outside of the district in the mid-20th century. Many civic, cultural, religious, and commercial buildings that served the German citizens of the city were not built in the Hamburg District.

== Contributing Properties ==
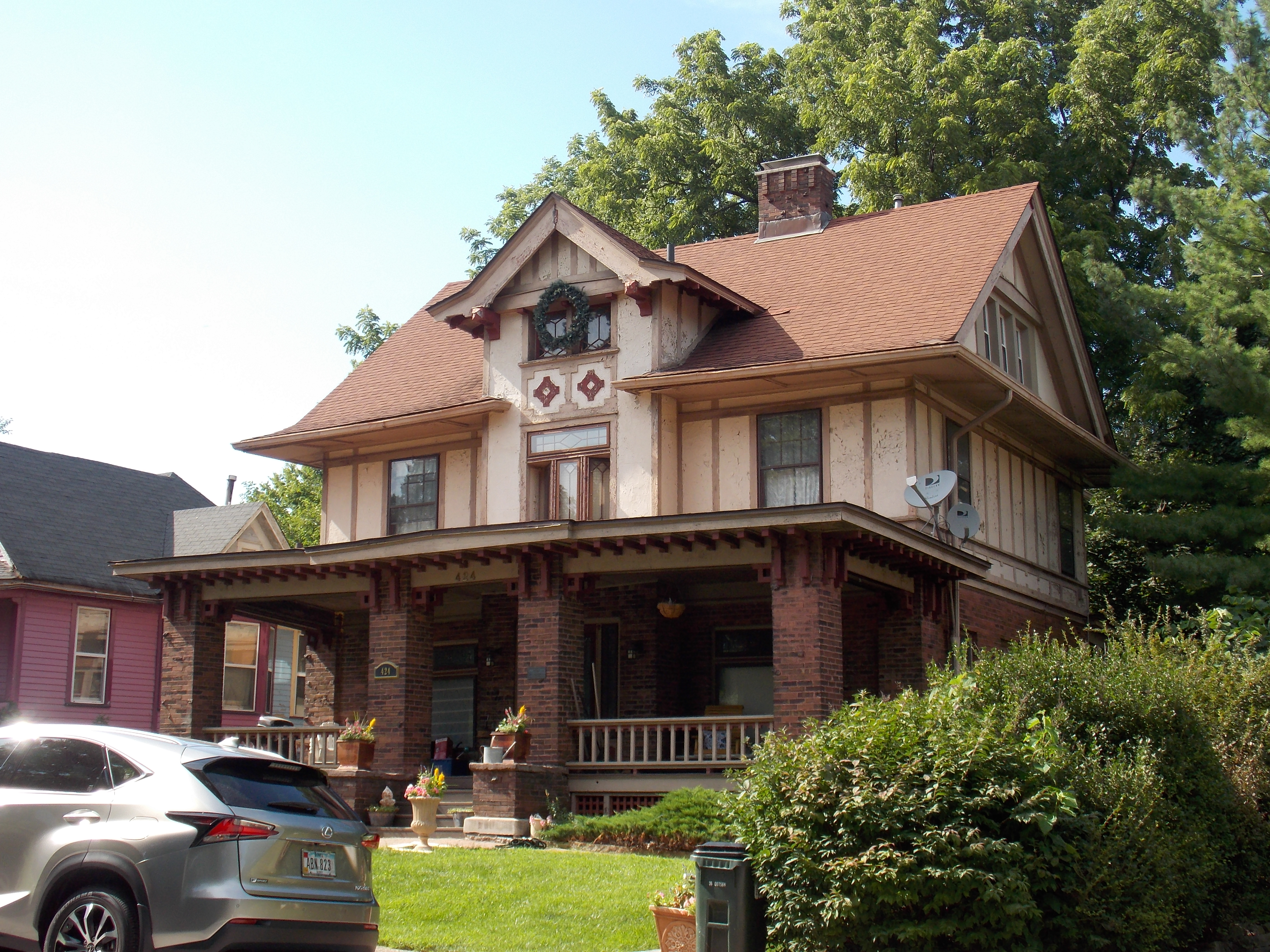
Deidrich J. Harfst House

The following is a listing of the more historically and architecturally significant houses in the district by architectural style. One of the houses is individually listed on the National Register of Historic Places and five are listed on the Davenport Register of Historic Properties. The extant brick streets and allies in the district were added as contributing structures in 2017.

=== Craftsman ===
- Deidrich J. Harfst House (1905) 424 W. 7th Street
- William H. Korn House (c. 1915) 730 W. 8th Street
- Charles E. Meier House (c. 1905) 519 W. Eighth Street

=== Greek Revival ===
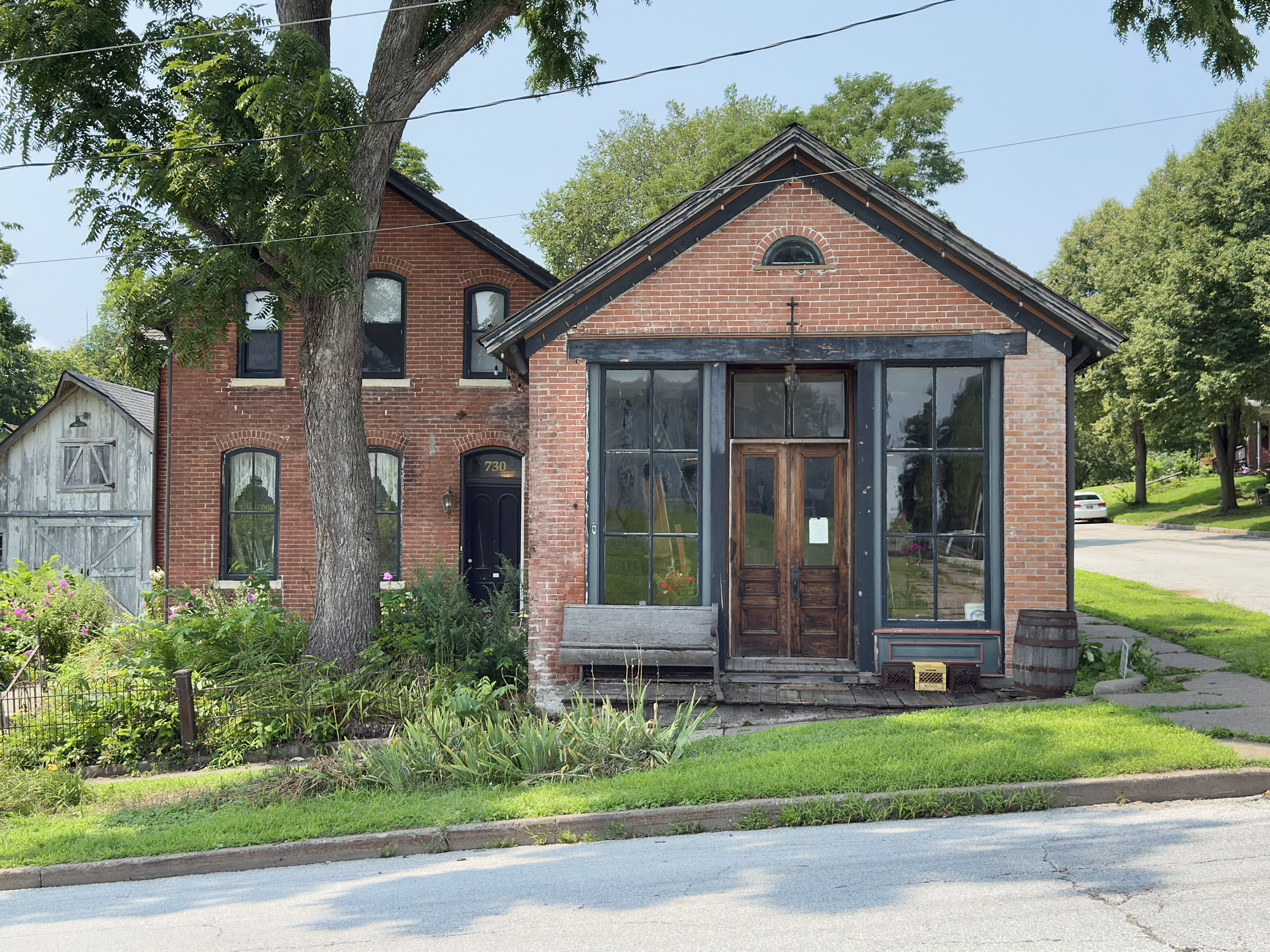
Christian Jipp Home & Grocery

- 716 W. 5th Street
- Frank & John Bredow House (c. 1876; DRHP-listed) 822 Gaines Street
- Goettsch House (c. 1850) 801 W. 6th Street
- Christian Jipp Home & Grocery (1868; DRHP-listed) 730-732 Gaines Street
- John G. & Angela Otten House (1864) 906 W. 5th Street
- Emanuel Rothschild House (c. 1855) 714 W. 6th Street
- Hans Stoltenberg House (c. 1870) 911 W. 7th Street
- Frederick Wunder House (1858) 916 W. 9th Street

=== Georgian Revival ===
- Henry Koehler House (1896) 817 W. 7th Street
- Dr. Heinrich Matthey House (1900; DRHP-listed) 505 W. 6th Street
- Christian Mueller House (c. 1910) 530 Ripley Street
- August Steffen Jr. House ("Overview"; 1901) 412 W. 6th Street

=== Gothic Revival ===
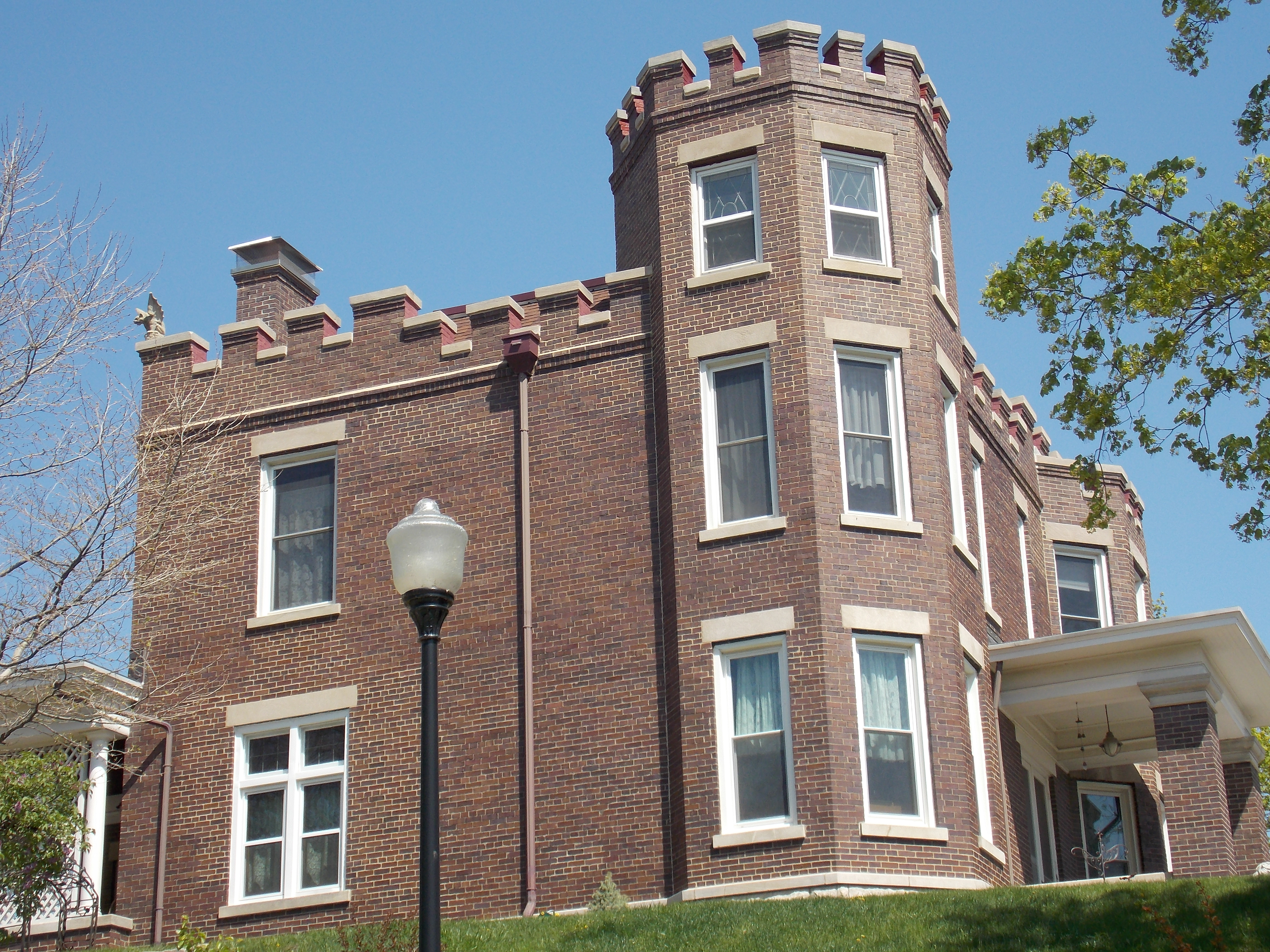
Henry Christian Struck House

- Charles Beiderbecke House (1881) 532 W. 7th Street
- Henry Frahm House (c. 1880) 321 W. 6th Street
- Francis Ochs House (c. 1870) 729 W. 6th Street
- Henry Christian Struck House (1909) 615 Ripley Street

=== Italianate ===
- Lambrite-Iles-Petersen House (1856; DRHP-listed) 510 W. 6th Street
- Henry Lischer House (1871; DRHP-listed) 624 W. 6th Street
- Petersen-Hanssen House (1878) 629 Brown Street
- August Steffen Sr. House (c. 1865) 420 W. 6th Street
- William J. Wiese House (c. 1895) 709 Brown Street

=== McClelland ===
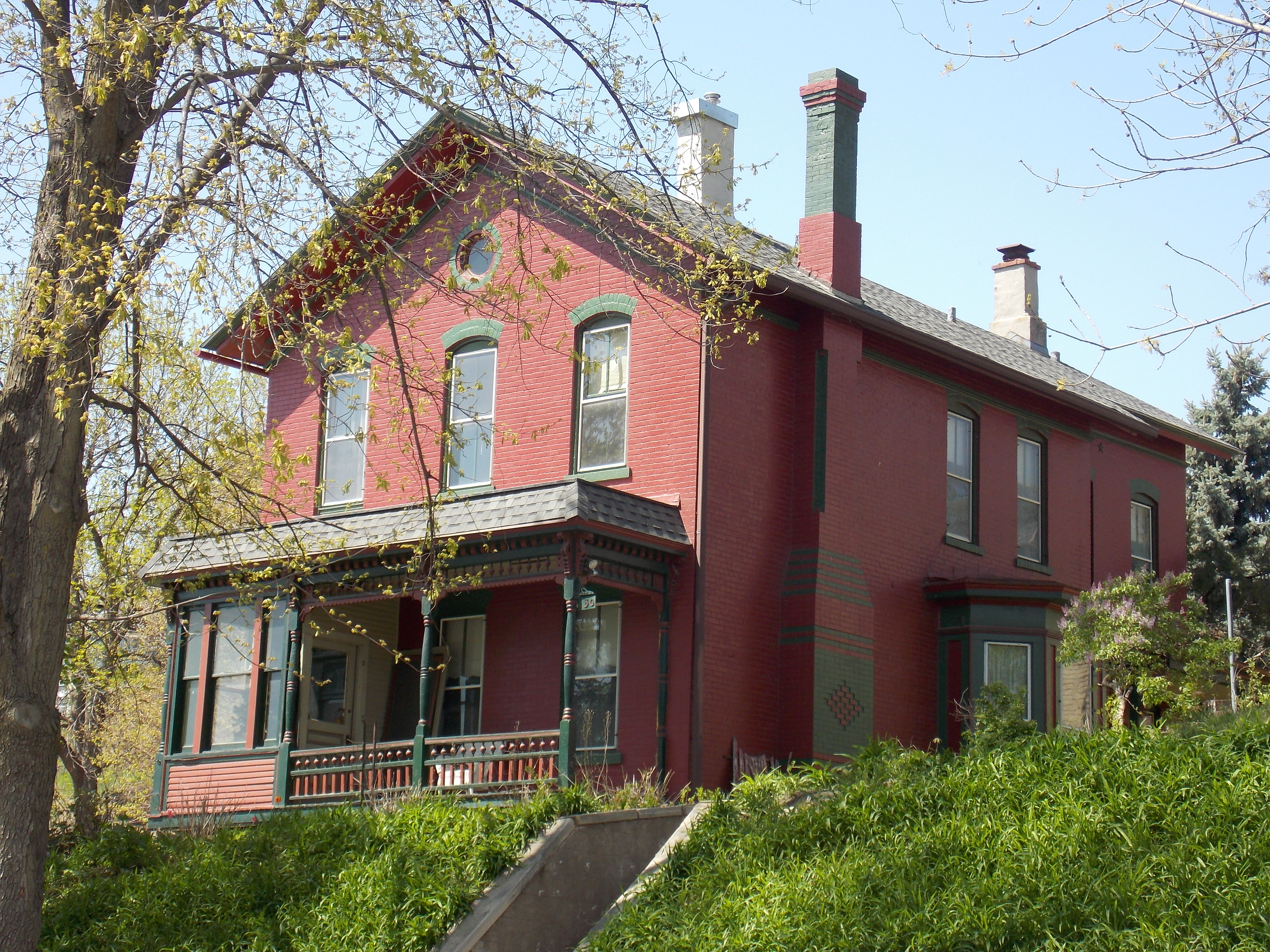
Frederick G. Clausen House

A vernacular house type named for Thomas McClelland, a prolific builder/contractor in Davenport, who built a significant number of them.

- John Bahls House (1864) 614 W. 5th Street
- Peter Bindschaedel House (1870) 917 W. 8th Street
- Frederick G. Clausen House (c. 1865) 630 W. 6th Street
- Henry & Franciska Dohrman House (1868) 630 Warren Street
- Gustav Hageboeck House (1870) 623 W. 6th Street
- Friederich Hartmann House (1868) 604 W. 5th Street
- Charles Hill House (c. 1875) 724 W. 8th Street
- Lavinius W. Petersen House (c. 1865) 530 Western Avenue

=== Mission Revival ===
- Louis P. and Clara K. Best Residence and Auto House (1910; NRHP-listed) 627 Ripley Street

=== Queen Anne ===
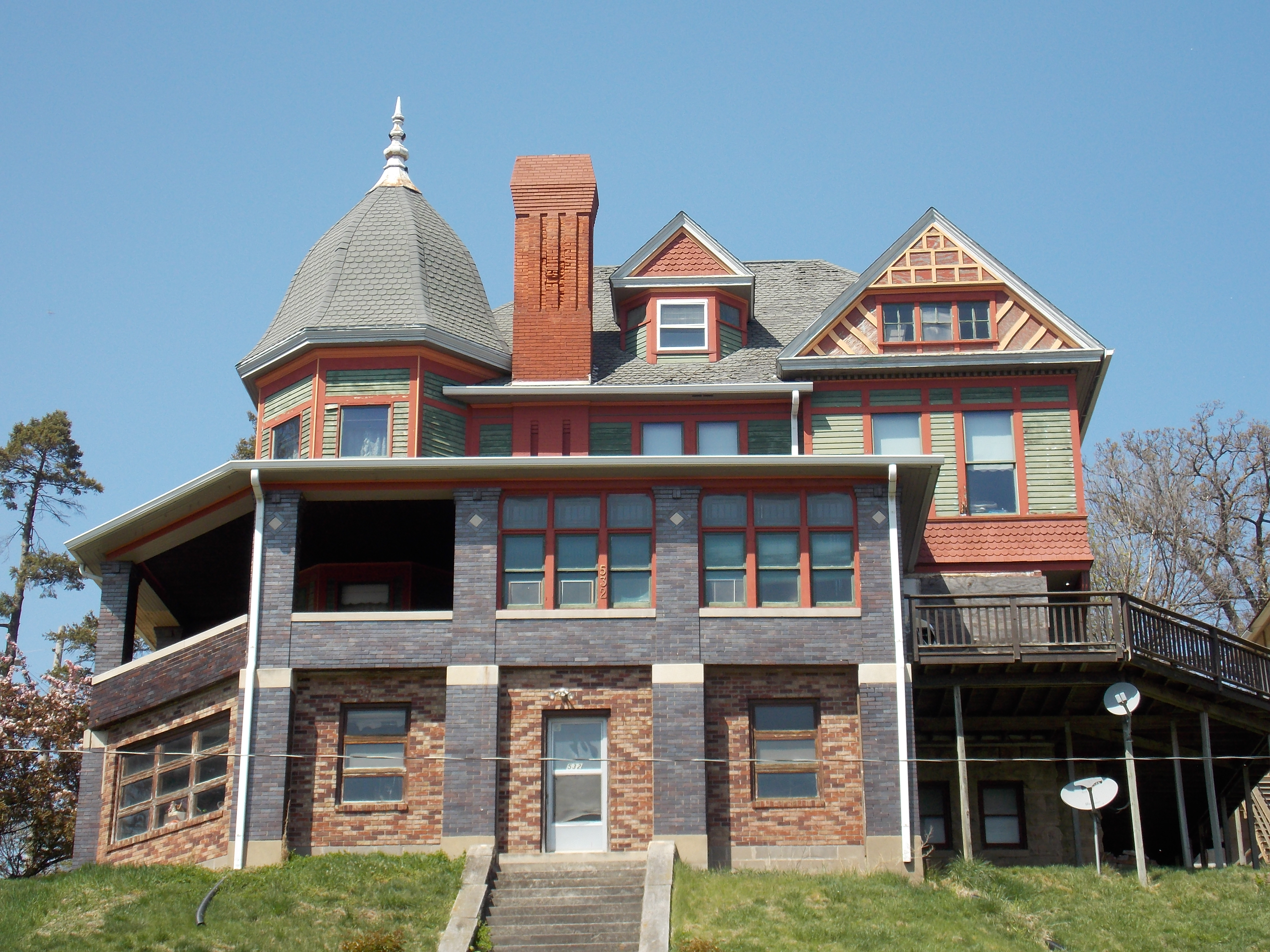
J.O. Seiffert House - A. J. Hirschel House

- H.H. Andressen House (c. 1865, 1885) 726 W. 6th Street
- Carl Beiderbecke House (c. 1890) 510 W. 7th Street
- William Hahn - Edward Berger House (1895) 803 W. 7th Street
- William Hoersch House (c. 1892) 402 W. 7th Street
- Oscar C. Koehler House (c. 1895) 817 W. 7th Street
- Claussen-Mueller House (c. 1900) 413 W. 6th Street
- Edward C. Mueller House (c. 1895) 429 W. 6th Street
- Louis Naeckle House (c. 1895) 703 Ripley Street
- Herman Schmidt House (c. 1895) 525 W. 9th Street
- George Schriebel House (c. 1855) 732 W. 5th Street
- J.O. Seiffert House - A. J. Hirschel House (c. 1890) 532 W. 6th Street
- J.C. Struck House (c. 1896) 703 Ripley Street
- Hennings Witt House (1894) 604 Gaines Street

=== Second Empire ===
- Henry Frahm House (c. 1880) 321 W. 6th Street
