= National Register of Historic Places listings in Jasper County, Iowa =

Location of Jasper County in Iowa

There are 18 properties and districts in Jasper County, Iowa, United States, which are listed on the National Register of Historic Places. Latitude and longitude coordinates are provided for many National Register properties and districts; these locations may be seen together in a map.

This National Park Service list is complete through NPS recent listings posted November 13, 2026.

	Name on the Register	Image	Date listed	Location	City or town	Description
1	Thomas Arthur House	Thomas Arthur House	October 7, 1982 (#82000410)	322 N. 8th Ave., E. 41°42′24″N 93°02′59″W	Newton	
2	August H. Bergman House	August H. Bergman House	July 13, 1989 (#89000856)	629 1st Ave. E. 41°41′56″N 93°02′44″W	Newton	
3	Samuel D. Butters House		May 21, 2026 (#100013063)	306 East Plainsmen Road; 41°35′43″N 93°14′00″W	Prairie City	
4	Byal Orchard Historic District		October 28, 1994 (#94001255)	W. 108th St. about 1.5 miles (2.4 km) south of its junction with Iowa Highway 223; 41°08′01″N 93°15′04″W	Mingo	
5	Colfax Spring City Commercial Historic District	Colfax Spring City Commercial Historic District	November 5, 2018 (#100003065)	Roughly Division to Front Sts. between Elm & Locust Sts. 41°40′38″N 93°14′42″W	Colfax	
6	Emerson Hough Elementary School	Emerson Hough Elementary School	October 24, 2002 (#02001232)	700 N. 4th Ave., E. 41°42′12″N 93°02′41″W	Newton	
7	First Avenue East Historic District	First Avenue East Historic District	December 7, 2020 (#100005888)	415–629 1st Ave. East, 5–10 Cardinal Ct. 41°41′58″N 93°02′54″W	Newton	
8	First Avenue West Historic District		December 7, 2020 (#100005889)	414–622 1st Ave. West; 41°41′58″N 93°03′33″W	Newton	
9	Fred Maytag Park Historic District		November 10, 2010 (#10000917)	301 S. 22nd Ave., W. 41°41′48″N 93°01′27″W	Newton	
10	German Evangelical Reformed Church		March 7, 1979 (#79000902)	North of Newton; 41°49′03″N 93°01′09″W	Newton	
11	James Norman Hall House	James Norman Hall House	July 12, 1984 (#84003853)	416 E. Howard St. 41°40′43″N 93°14′19″W	Colfax	
12	Jasper County Courthouse	Jasper County Courthouse	July 2, 1981 (#81000249)	1st Ave. between W. 1st St. and W. 2nd St. 41°42′00″N 93°03′15″W	Newton	
13	J.G. and Regina Long House	J.G. and Regina Long House	April 14, 1997 (#97000307)	8628 S. 104th Ave. W. 41°33′06″N 93°11′55″W	Prairie City	This Italianate house was built just west of Monroe, and was still located there when it was listed on the National Register in 1997. It was moved to its present location south of Prairie City in 2013.
14	Lynnville Mill and Dam	Lynnville Mill and Dam	November 25, 1977 (#77000522)	East St. 41°35′00″N 92°47′13″W	Lynnville	
15	Maytag Plant No. 1 Historic District		June 25, 2026 (#100013157)	Roughly bounded by W 4th St N, N 3rd Ave W, IIRR; 41°42′11″N 93°03′27″W	Newton	
16	Newton Downtown Historic District	Newton Downtown Historic District	September 22, 2014 (#14000665)	Centered around Courthouse Sq. 41°41′58″N 93°03′16″W	Newton	
17	Red Bridge	Red Bridge	May 15, 1998 (#98000521)	County Road S74 over the South Skunk River; 41°32′28″N 93°01′15″W	Monroe	
18	St. Stephen's Episcopal Church	St. Stephen's Episcopal Church	September 22, 1977 (#77000523)	223 E. 4th St., N. 41°42′04″N 93°03′00″W	Newton	

== See also ==
- List of National Historic Landmarks in Iowa
- National Register of Historic Places listings in Iowa
- Listings in neighboring counties: Mahaska, Marion, Marshall, Polk, Poweshiek, Story
