= National Register of Historic Places listings in Marshall County, Iowa =

Location of Marshall County in Iowa

This is a list of the National Register of Historic Places listings in Marshall County, Iowa.

This is intended to be a complete list of the properties and districts on the National Register of Historic Places in Marshall County, Iowa, United States. Latitude and longitude coordinates are provided for many National Register properties and districts; these locations may be seen together in a map.

There are 19 properties and districts listed on the National Register in the county. Another property was once listed but has been removed.

This National Park Service list is complete through NPS recent listings posted August 21, 2026.

	Name on the Register	Image	Date listed	Location	City or town	Description
1	Thaddeus Binford House	Thaddeus Binford House	January 12, 1984 (#84001286)	110 N. 2nd Ave. 42°03′04″N 92°54′34″W	Marshalltown	
2	Dobbin Round Barn	Dobbin Round Barn	June 30, 1986 (#86001459)	Off County Road S52; 41°59′06″N 93°11′58″W	State Center	
3	Matthew Edel Blacksmith Shop and House	Matthew Edel Blacksmith Shop and House	March 11, 1983 (#83000391)	1st St. and 3rd Ave. 41°56′42″N 92°57′40″W	Haverhill	
4	Glick-Sower House	Glick-Sower House	April 22, 1993 (#93000331)	201 E. State St. 42°03′00″N 92°54′33″W	Marshalltown	
5	Frederick and Mary Grumme House		February 6, 2026 (#100012698)	503 West Main Street; 42°02′57″N 92°55′18″W	Marshalltown	
6	Home Oil Service Station		June 16, 2025 (#100011924)	108 4th Street SE; 42°00′50″N 93°09′42″W	State Center	
7	Le Grand Bridge		May 15, 1998 (#98000481)	Abbot Ave. over the Iowa River; 42°01′54″N 92°45′58″W	Le Grand	Extended into Tama County. Profile from the Iowa Department of Transportation
8	Le Grand Bridge	Le Grand Bridge	May 15, 1998 (#98000499)	County Road T37 over a backwater of the Iowa River; 42°01′47″N 92°46′59″W	Le Grand	
9	Marshall County Courthouse	Marshall County Courthouse	November 21, 1972 (#72000478)	Courthouse Sq. 42°02′55″N 92°54′42″W	Marshalltown	
10	Marshalltown Downtown Historic District	Marshalltown Downtown Historic District	January 17, 2002 (#01001463)	Roughly bounded by 2nd St., State St., 3rd. Ave., and E. Church St. 42°02′57″N 92°54′48″W	Marshalltown	
11	Minerva Creek Bridge		May 15, 1998 (#98000497)	County Road S52 over Minerva Creek; 42°08′21″N 93°09′21″W	Clemons	
12	Quarry Bridge	Quarry Bridge	May 15, 1998 (#98000498)	County Road I-4 over the Iowa River; 42°01′35″N 92°48′29″W	Marshalltown	
13	August and Josephine Riemenschneider Farmstead		February 16, 2022 (#100007464)	201 4th Ave. NE; 42°01′08″N 93°09′31″W	State Center	
14	State Center Commercial Historic District		September 20, 2002 (#02001034)	Blocks 200 and 100 of W. Main St. and 100 E. Main St. 42°00′58″N 93°09′51″W	State Center	
15	Robert H. Sunday House	Robert H. Sunday House	November 9, 1988 (#88002141)	1701 Woodfield Rd. 42°01′36″N 92°55′40″W	Marshalltown	
16	Watson's Grocery	Watson's Grocery	October 22, 1998 (#98001271)	106 Main St. 42°00′59″N 93°09′50″W	State Center	
17	C.H. Whitehead House	C.H. Whitehead House	January 15, 1979 (#79000916)	108 N. 3rd St. 42°02′57″N 92°55′22″W	Marshalltown	
18	Leroy R. Willard House	Leroy R. Willard House	October 22, 1976 (#76000794)	609 W. Main St. 42°02′57″N 92°55′22″W	Marshalltown	
19	Louis F. and Emma M. (Edler) Wohlert House-Emma Wohlert Maternity Home		December 2, 2024 (#100011083)	407 3rd Ave NE; 42°01′14″N 93°09′41″W	State Center	

== Former listing ==
	Name on the Register	Image	Date listed	Date removed	Location	City or town	Description
1	First Church of Christ, Scientist	First Church of Christ, Scientist	December 29, 1978 (#79000915)	May 22, 1998	412W. Main St.	Marshalltown	Demolished in August, 1985.

== See also ==
- List of National Historic Landmarks in Iowa
- National Register of Historic Places listings in Iowa
- Listings in neighboring counties: Grundy, Hardin, Jasper, Story, Tama
