= First Avenue West Historic District =

Historic district in Iowa, United States

- U.S. National Register of Historic Places
- U.S. Historic district
- Location within Iowa Location within the United States
- Location: 414–622 1st Ave. West, Newton, Iowa
- Coordinates: 41°41′58″N 93°03′33″W
- NRHP reference No.: 100005889
- Added to NRHP: December 7, 2020

The First Avenue West Historic District is a nationally recognized historic district located in Newton, Iowa, United States. It was listed on the National Register of Historic Places in 2020. At the time it was studied for the City of Newton it contained 33 resources, which included 25 contributing buildings and eight non-contributing buildings. The district is mainly a residential area made up of single-family houses and their outbuildings. It is immediately adjacent to the Newton Downtown Historic District to the east. Many of the homes in the district were built by locally prominent businessmen, especially those involved with the washing machine industry, as well as bankers, and merchants; many of which contributed to the development of the City of Newton. There are many examples of high-style architecture popular when the houses were built in the late-19th and early-20th centuries. The most popular style in the district, however, is the two-story American Foursquare. There are also bungalows. In addition to houses, there are two commercial buildings, an apartment building, and New City Hall all of which are non-contributing properties due to their age. Two of the houses have been deemed to be individually eligible for the National Register of Historic Places.
