= Thomas Arthur House =

Historic house in Iowa, United States

- U.S. National Register of Historic Places
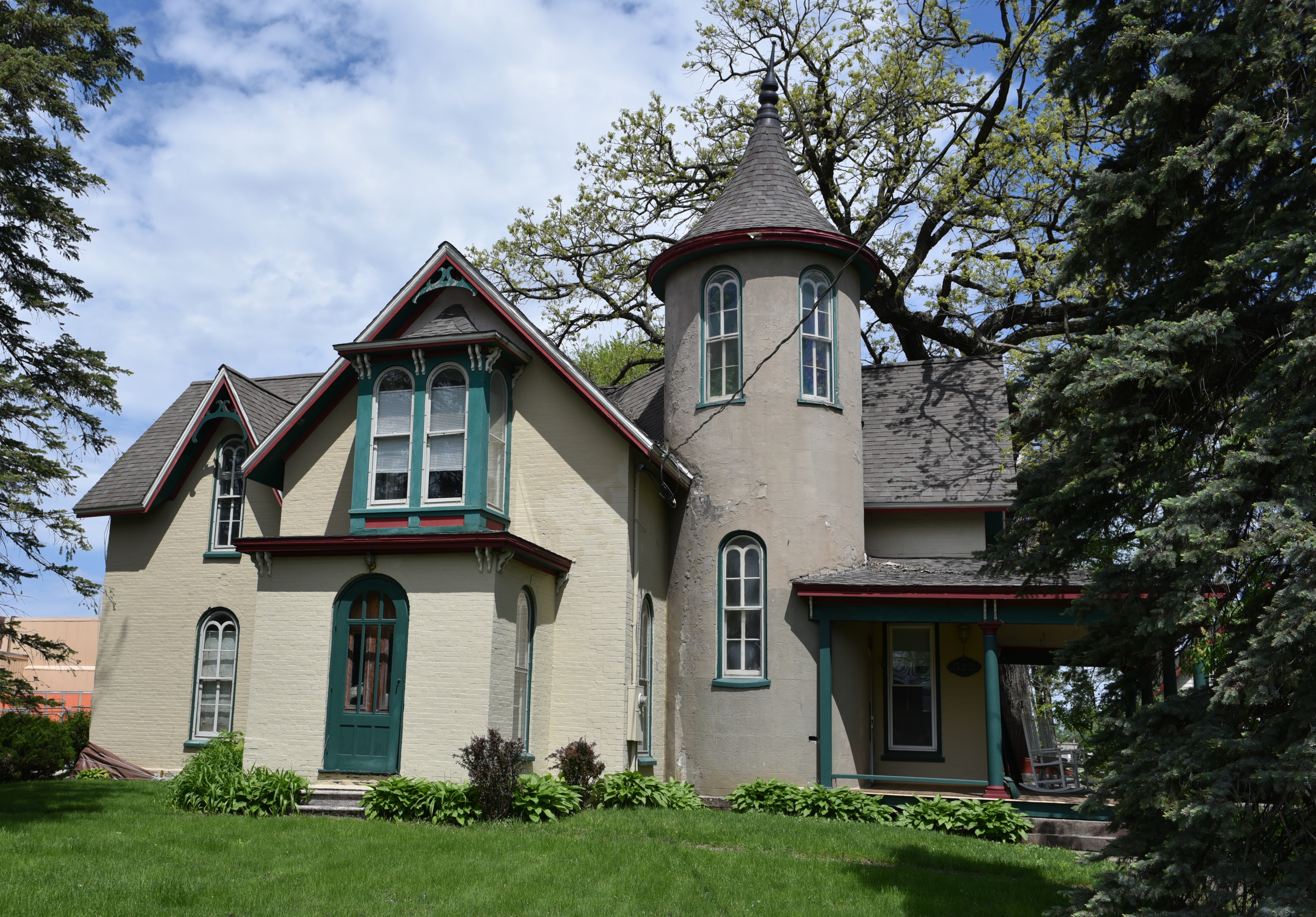

- Location within Iowa Location within the United States
- Location: 322 N. 8th Ave., E. Newton, Iowa
- Coordinates: 41°42′24″N 93°03′01″W
- Area: less than one acre
- Built: 1865
- Built by: Thomas Arthur
- Architectural style: Late Gothic Revival
- NRHP reference No.: 82000410
- Added to NRHP: October 7, 1982

The Thomas Arthur House is a historic residence located in Newton, Iowa, United States. Arthur was a land agent who held two offices in Jasper County government. He was also one of the incorporators for St. Stephen's Episcopal Church in Newton, was involved in acquiring the property for the church, and may have donated it. He moved his family to Oakland, California about 1876, and the house was sold to the Rev. Joseph Evans Ryan, the Rector for St. Stephan's. Built in 1865, the painted brick Late Gothic Revival house is the only elaborate house in that style in the city, and only one of a few such houses in central Iowa. Its distinguishing feature is a three-story, round tower with a flared, conical roof. The only access to the second floor is by way of the tower. The house was listed on the National Register of Historic Places in 1982.
