= Robert H. Sunday House =

Historic house in Iowa, United States

- U.S. National Register of Historic Places
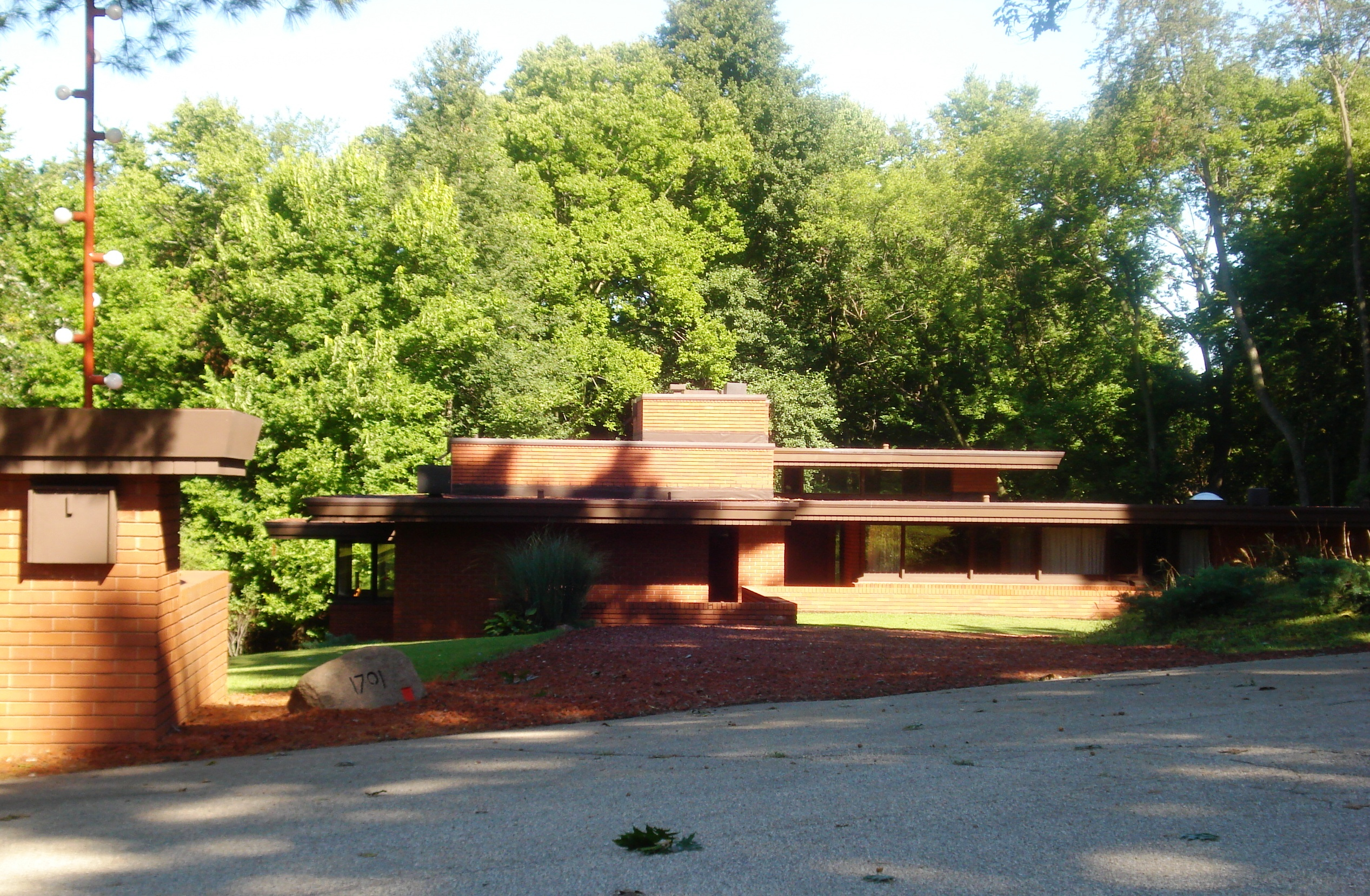

- Location within Iowa Location within the United States
- Location: 1701 Woodfield Rd. Marshalltown, Iowa
- Coordinates: 42°1′36″N 92°55′40″W
- Built: 1957–1960
- Architect: Frank Lloyd Wright
- Architectural style: Late 19th And Early 20th Century American Movements
- MPS: Iowa Usonian Houses by Frank Lloyd Wright, 1945–1960, MPS
- NRHP reference No.: 88002141
- Added to NRHP: November 9, 1988

The Robert H. Sunday House is located in Marshalltown, Iowa, United States. It was designed by Frank Lloyd Wright in the Usonian style, and was listed on the National Register of Historic Places in 1988. Initially the Sundays choose the Usonian Automatic, a natural concrete block model, for their home. When it provided unworkable, Wright sent the plans for this house. In style and materials it is very similar to the 1953 Usonian Exhibition House. It was the sixth of seven houses designed by Wright and built in this style in Iowa. Sunday, who owned Marshall Lumber in Marshalltown, acted as his own general contractor. In fact, he and his wife did much of the work themselves. It is also believed to be last of this style built in brick. John H. "Jack" Howe, a Wright assistant who supervised the initial construction, designed an addition to this house in 1970 that conforms seamlessly with the original. It includes the family room, family room terrace, and the dining room. The original house followed an L-shaped plan, and with the addition it is now a T-shaped plan. Howe had previously designed (1964) the building for Sunday's business.

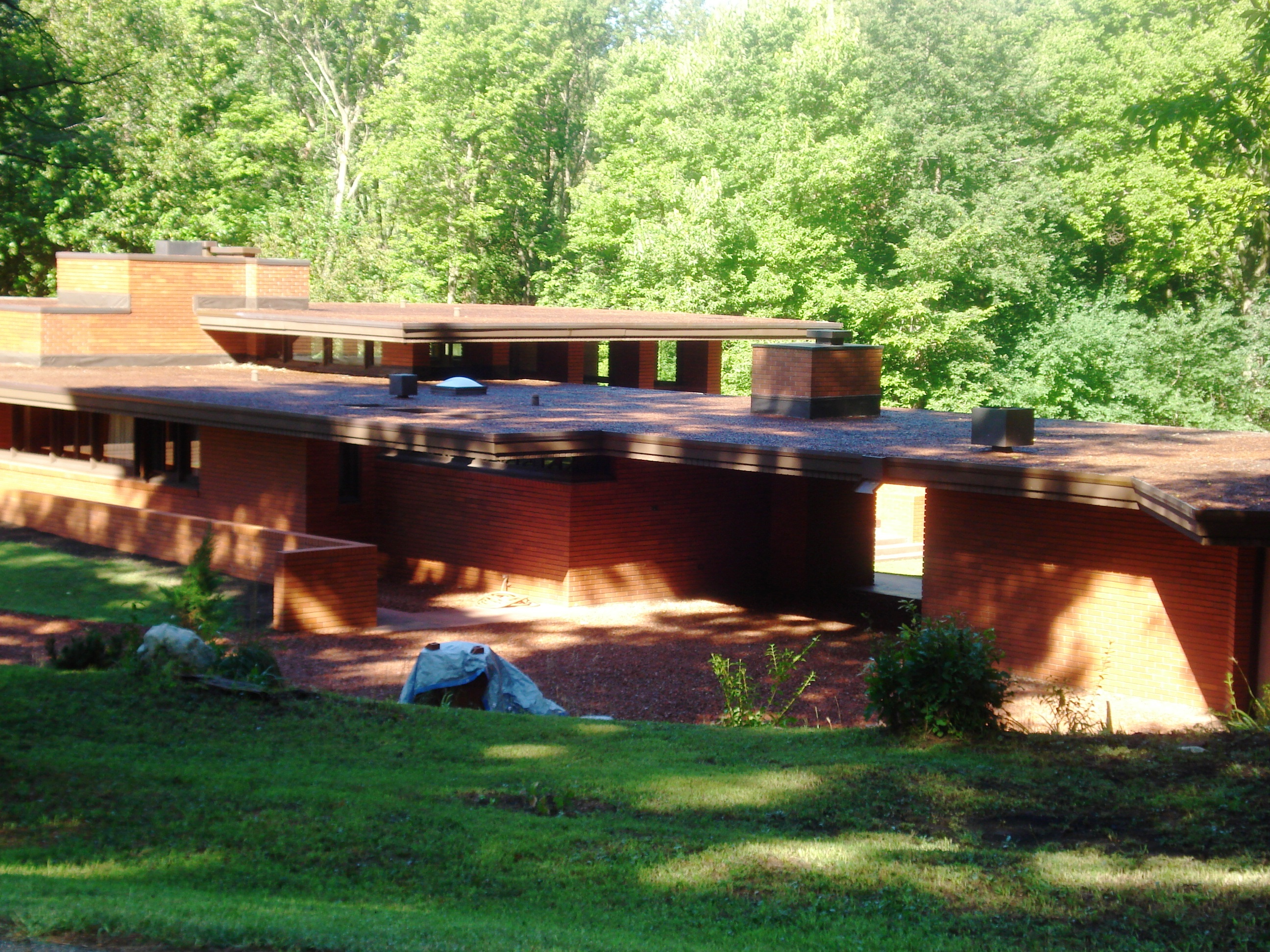

== See also ==
- List of Frank Lloyd Wright works
- National Register of Historic Places listings in Marshall County, Iowa
