= State Center Commercial Historic District =

Historic district in Iowa, United States

- U.S. National Register of Historic Places
- U.S. Historic district
- Location within Iowa Location within the United States
- Location: Blocks 200 and 100 of W. Main St. and 100 E. Main St., State Center, Iowa
- Coordinates: 42°00′58″N 93°09′51″W
- Area: 9 acres (3.6 ha)
- Architectural style: Prairie School; Late 19th & early 20th century Revivals
- MPS: Iowa's Main Street Commercial Architecture MPS
- NRHP reference No.: 02001034
- Added to NRHP: September 20, 2002

The State Center Commercial Historic District is a nationally recognized historic district located in State Center, Iowa, United States. It was listed on the National Register of Historic Places in 2002. At the time of its nomination it contained 36 resources, which included 31 contributing buildings, two contributing structures, and three non-contributing buildings. The historic district covers the town's central business district. State Center is located at the highest point in Marshall County, midway between Marshalltown and Nevada. The town was established by the Cedar Rapids & Missouri Railroad on 80 acres (32 ha) of land in 1863. It was initially named "Centre Station," but William Barnes, the first railroad agent, changed the town's name to "State Centre."

The Lincoln Highway was originally routed on Fourth and Fifth Streets through town. The route was changed around 1924 bringing it down Main Street, which was paved in 1930. Unlike many other towns along the route, the street was paved with concrete rather than brick pavers. Main Street is one of the contributing structures in the historic district.

The district contains a mix of commercial buildings, an opera house, a medical facility, residential and industrial structures. Civic buildings include the fire station, city hall, post office, and former high school (now a middle school). Watson's Grocery was individually listed on the National Register of Historic Places in 1998. The buildings range in size from small-scale and modest size structures, which reflect the impact of destructive fires in 1895 and 1917 and State Center's modest commercial economy. The period of significance is from 1869 to 1952, and the buildings are constructed during that time frame. Late 19th and early 20th-century revival styles and the Prairie School style are dominant.
