= First Avenue East Historic District =

Historic district in Iowa, United States

- U.S. National Register of Historic Places
- U.S. Historic district
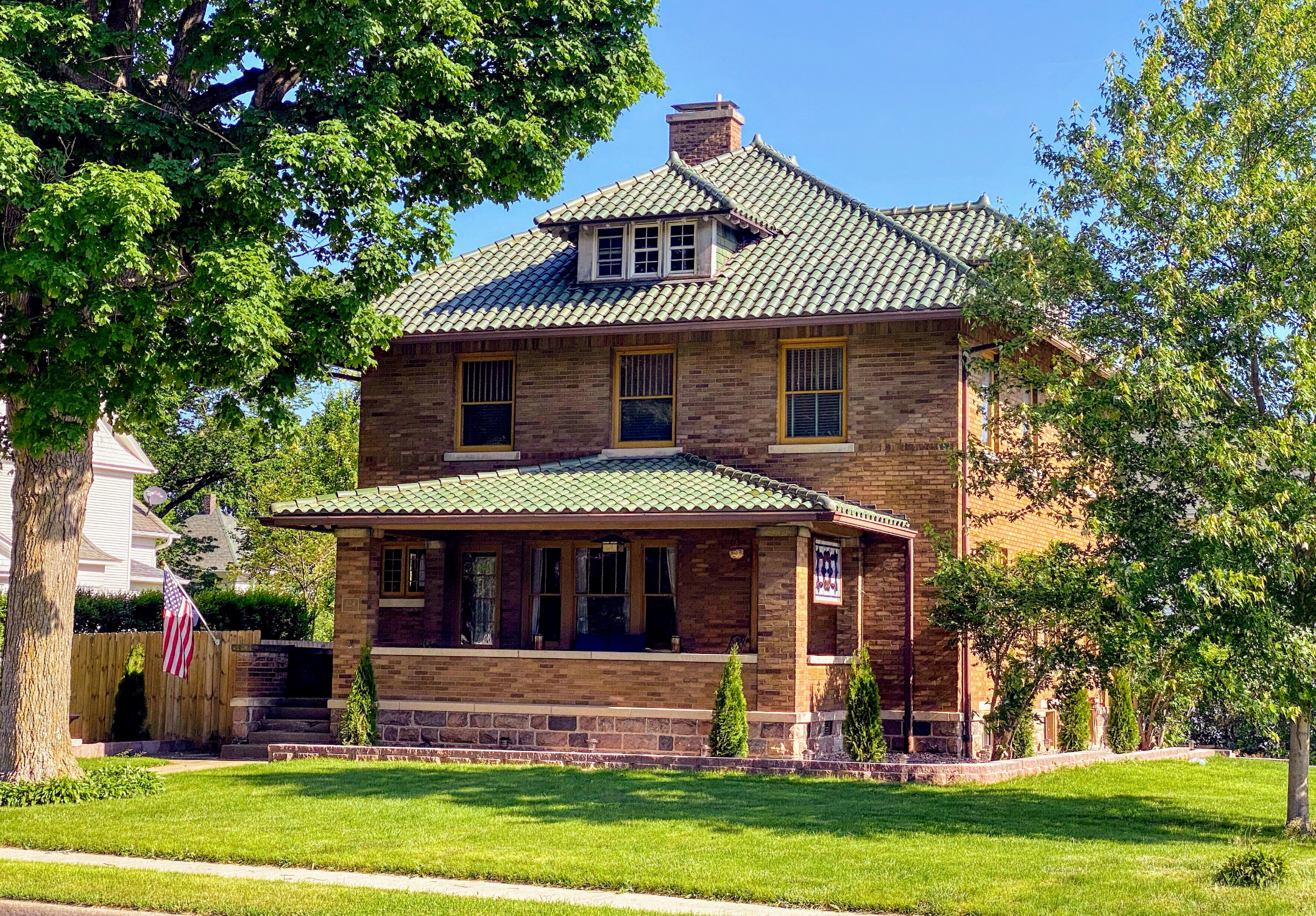
- Hummel House

- Location within Iowa Location within the United States
- Location: 415–629 1st Ave. East, 5–10 Cardinal Ct., Newton, Iowa
- Coordinates: 41°41′58″N 93°02′54″W
- NRHP reference No.: 100005888
- Added to NRHP: December 7, 2020

The First Avenue East Historic District is a nationally recognized historic district located in Newton, Iowa, United States. It was listed on the National Register of Historic Places in 2020. At the time it was studied for the City of Newton it contained 30 resources, which included 20 contributing buildings and 10 non-contributing buildings. The district is mainly a residential area made up of single-family houses and their outbuildings. It is immediately adjacent to the Newton Downtown Historic District to the west. Many of the homes in the district were built by locally prominent businessmen, especially those involved with the washing machine industry, as well as bankers, and merchants; many of which contributed to the development of the City of Newton. There are many examples of high-style architecture popular when the houses were built in the late-19th and early-20th centuries. The most visible style in the district, however, is the two-story American Foursquare. There are also bungalows. In addition to houses, there are several commercial buildings in the district, two of which, Jasper County Farm Bureau (1952) and Yes Way Gas Station (1968) are contributing properties. The August H. Bergman House is individually listed on the National Register of Historic Places and four others have been deemed to be individually eligible.
