= St. Stephen's Episcopal Church (Newton, Iowa) =

- U.S. National Register of Historic Places
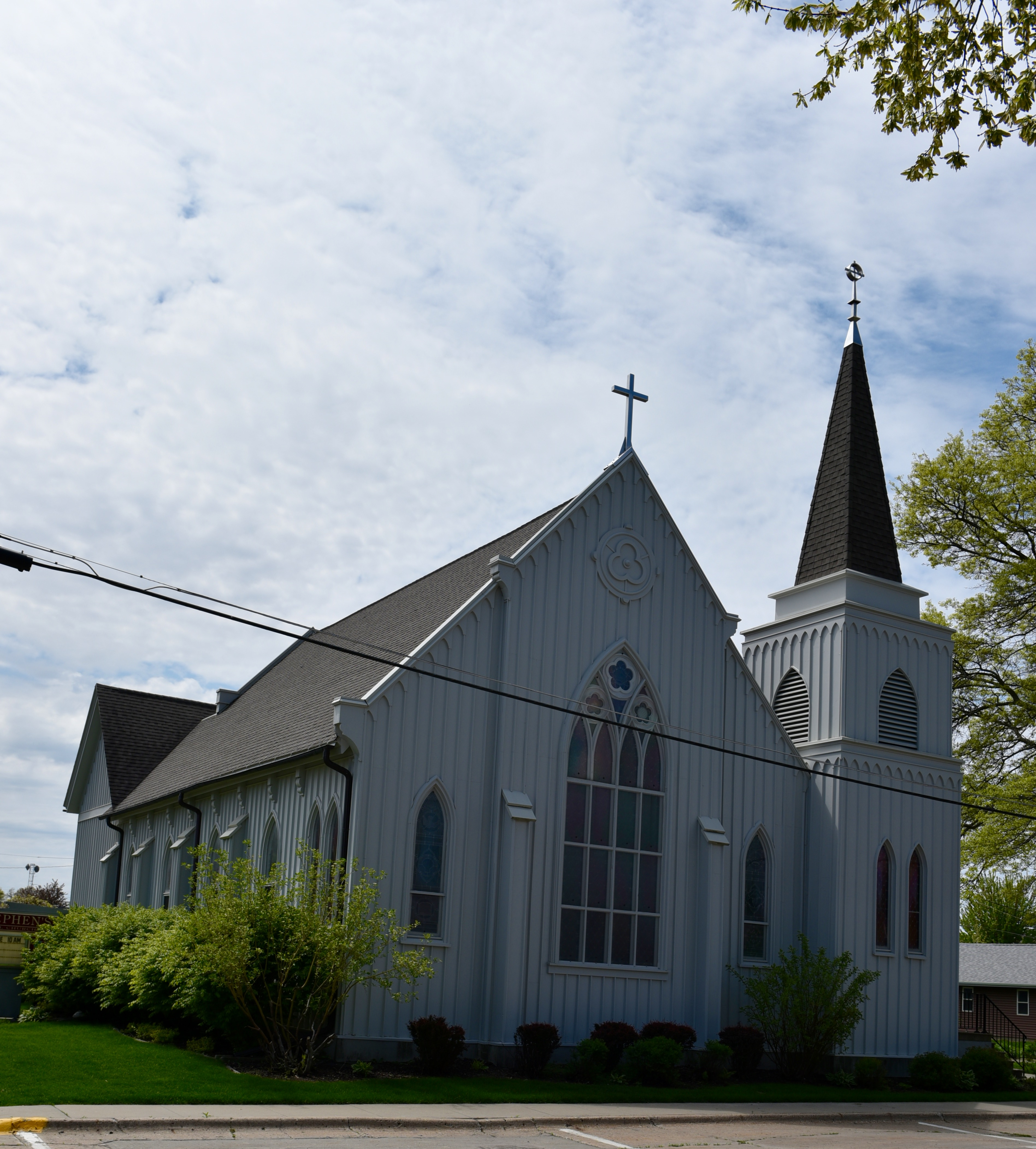

- Location within Iowa Location within the United States
- Location: 223 E. 4th St., N. Newton, Iowa
- Coordinates: 41°42′4″N 93°3′0″W
- Area: less than one acre
- Built: 1881
- Built by: David S. Strover, builder Joe Stevens, carpenter
- Architectural style: Carpenter Gothic
- NRHP reference No.: 77000523
- Added to NRHP: September 22, 1977

St. Stephen's Episcopal Church is an historic Carpenter Gothic style Episcopal Church church building located in Newton, Iowa, United States. Completed in 1881, it was built by the contractor David S. Strover and master carpenter Joe Stevens. On September 22, 1977, it was listed on the National Register of Historic Places. It serves a parish church in the Episcopal Diocese of Iowa.

In 2015, the church reported 217 members; in 2023, it reported 103 members. No membership statistics were reported in 2024 national parochial reports. Plate and pledge financial support reported by the church in 2024 was $45,346. Average Sunday Attendance (ASA) reported in 2024 was 21 persons. This was a relative decrease from ASA of 47 persons reported in 2015.

== History ==
The parish was formed on December 1, 1867, by the Rev. W. T. Currie from St. Paul's Church in Durant. It was incorporated the following year. Prior to this, worship services were held occasionally in the Jasper County Courthouse and in Union Hall. Some of the services were conducted by Iowa's first bishop, Henry Washington Lee, who encouraged the mission work in Newton.

Property for the church was bought by Thomas Arthur for $825. David S. Stover designed the church and Joseph Stevens was responsible for construction, which began in 1871. The church was completed in 1874, with the exception of the bell tower. The first liturgy was celebrated in the church on April 19, 1874, by Rev. J. Sanders Reed of Des Moines. The building is Carpenter Gothic in design. The stained glass windows are a combination of English, Victorian and Arts-and-Crafts. The organ was bought by Col. Ryan, Thomas Arthur, and Lena Clark for $700. It was first used on Christmas 1874. It is the oldest church in continual use for worship in Newton.

By 1878 the parish had been reduced to 30 communicants. Between 1878 and 1911 the parish was too small to support a priest. With the exception of weddings and funerals, services were not being held. There was also no resident priest during the Great Depression. Rev. Joseph Gregori began to revitalize the parish beginning in 1949 and it became an independent parish in 1962. The education wing was completed the following year. The tower base, which serves as the narthex, was originally on the northeast corner of the main facade. It was moved to the other side in the 1960s and the second level of the tower and the spire were added at that time. They were part of the original plan for the church, but were not built because of a lack of funds.

== Architecture ==
The sanctuary measures 52 by 32 feet (15.8 by 9.8 m), and the education wing is 53 by 50 feet (16 by 15 m). The exterior is of the entire complex is covered with board-and-batten siding. Even though the education wing was added almost 90 years after the sanctuary they conform stylistically. The window openings and the entryways feature pointed arch windows. The exception is a round arch over the entry into the education wing. Other architectural elements include short buttresses and small brackets beneath the narrow eaves. A small chancel extends off of the back. The altar, pews, choir stalls, and stained glass windows are from the early years of the church.
