= Byal Orchard Historic District =

Historic district in Iowa, United States

- U.S. National Register of Historic Places
- U.S. Historic district
- Location within Iowa Location within the United States
- Location: W. 108th St. about 1.5 miles (2.4 km) south of its junction with Iowa Highway 223
- Nearest city: Mingo, Iowa
- Coordinates: 41°47′38″N 93°14′40″W
- Area: 13 acres (5.3 ha)
- NRHP reference No.: 94001255
- Added to NRHP: October 28, 1994

Byal Orchard Historic District is a nationally recognized historic district located northeast of Mingo, Iowa, United States. It was listed on the National Register of Historic Places in 1994. At the time of its nomination it contained three resources, which included two contributing sites, and one contributing structure. It includes four strands of top-worked apple trees that were planted 1933 to 1934, and a windbreak of Ash and Mulberry trees that were planted in 1936. They both count as the sites, and the structure is a network of traffic corridors that were established 1933 to 1934. Its historic significance comes from the symbiotic relationship between science and practice in Iowa agriculture. They used planting techniques that were advocated by researchers at Iowa State College, now Iowa State University, and carried out by progressive fruit growers like Hugh and Roscoe Byale. In this instance they employed Hibernal root stock and top-work grafting. The Armistice Day Blizzard in 1940 wiped out most of Iowa's apple orchards, but it validated the techniques employed here.
