= Watson's Grocery =

Historic grocery store in Iowa, United States

- U.S. National Register of Historic Places
- U.S. Historic district – Contributing property
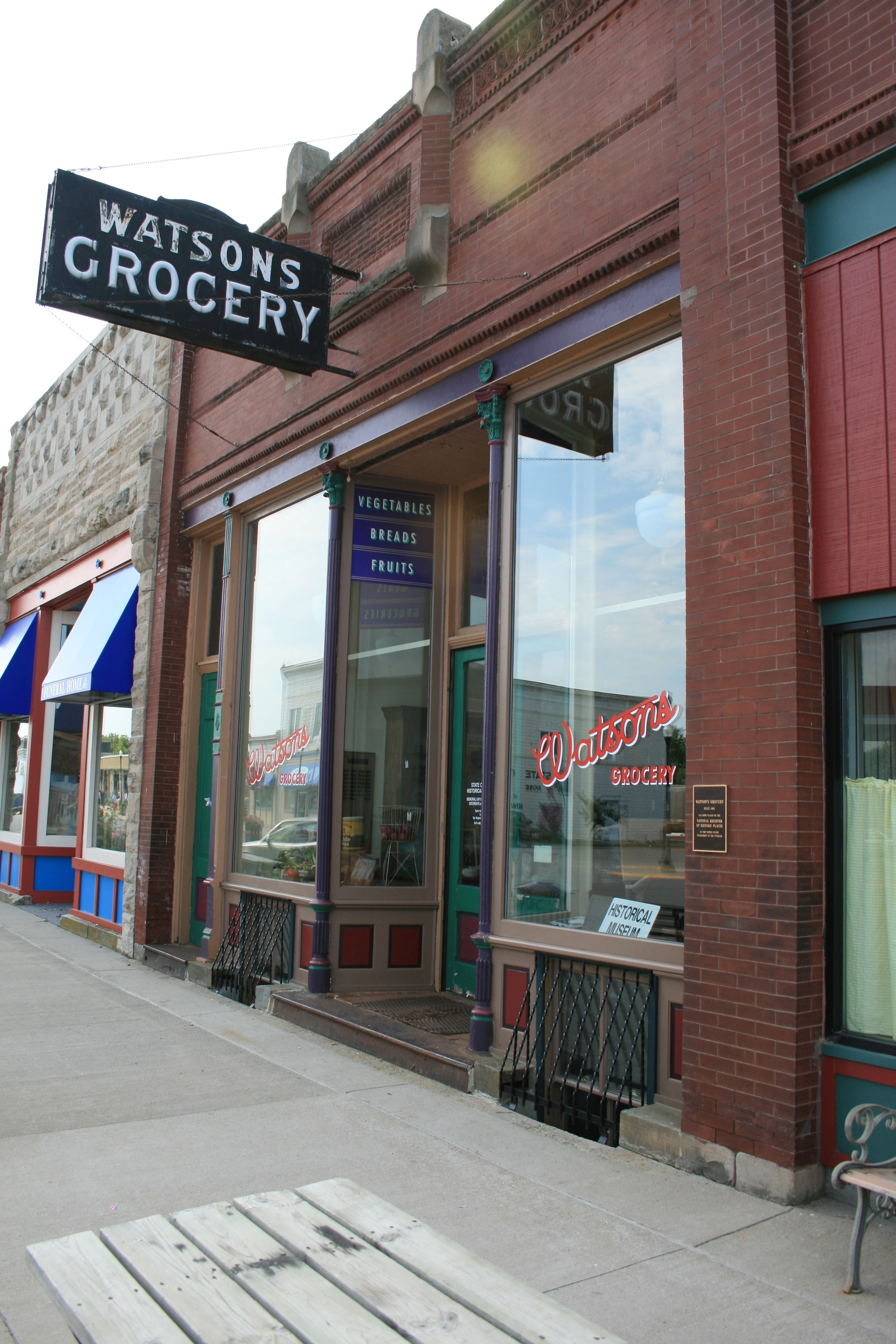

- Location within Iowa Location within the United States
- Location: 106 W. Main Street; State Center, Iowa
- Coordinates: 42°00′59″N 93°09′50″W
- Built: 1895
- Architectural style: Late Victorian
- Part of: State Center Commercial Historic District (ID02001034)
- NRHP reference No.: 98001271
- Added to NRHP: October 22, 1998

The Watson's Grocery is located in State Center, Iowa. The store was built in 1895 for William Watson, owner of Watson's Grocery Store, and has been listed on the National Register of Historic Places since 1998. It was listed as a contributing property on the State Center Commercial Historic District in 1998.

== History ==
William Watson established Watson's Grocery Store in 1885. A fire destroyed the original store. In 1895 a new building was constructed at 106 W Main Street. The building and interior would remain nearly unchanged throughout its years of operation. In 1981, Florence Watson closed the store, locking the doors and leaving everything as it was. Florence died eight years later in 1989. On October 19, 1989, the community of State Center reopened Watson's Grocery Store as an early Twentieth Century grocery store museum.
