= C.H. Whitehead House =

Historic house in Iowa, United States

- U.S. National Register of Historic Places
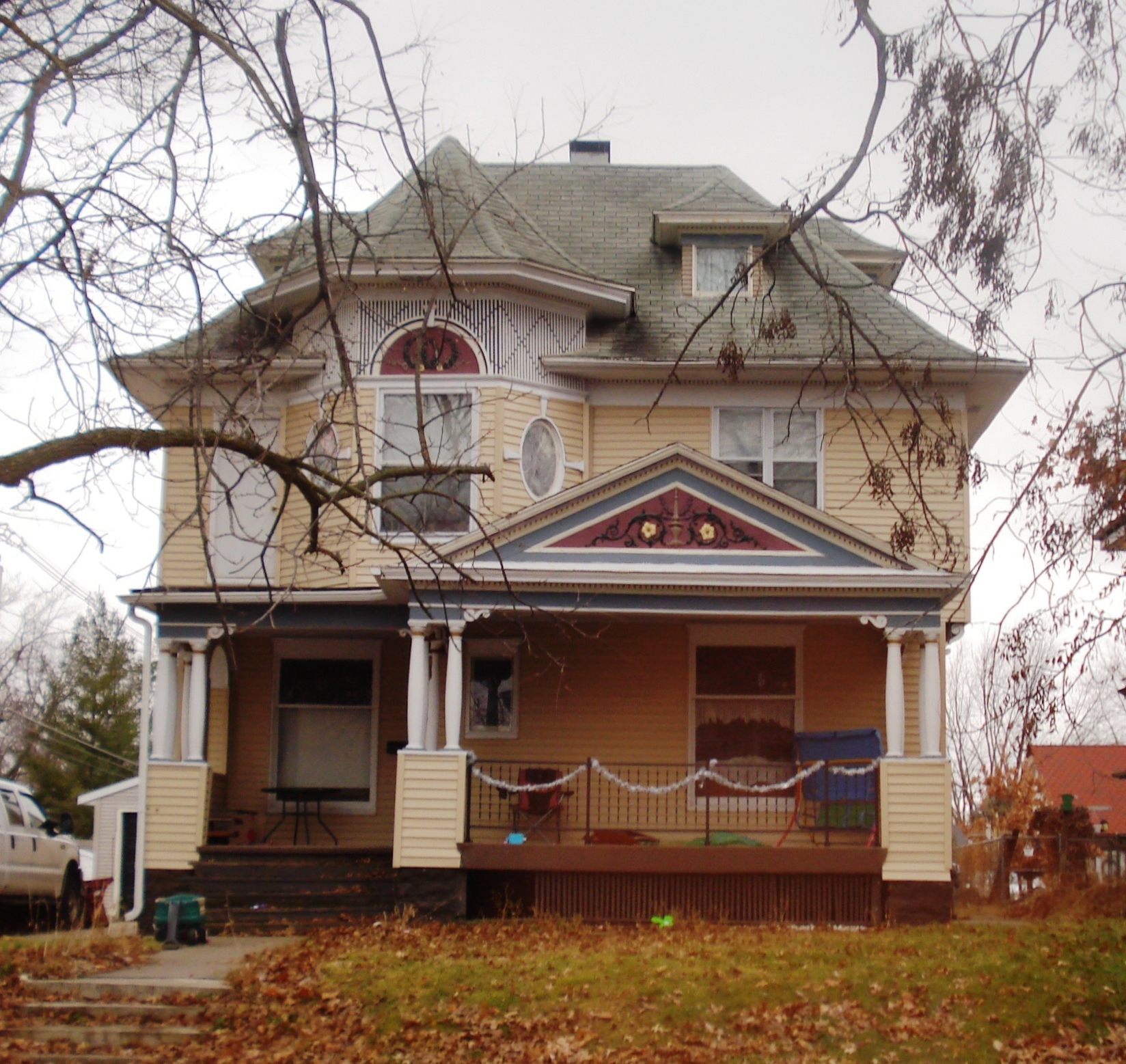

- Location within Iowa Location within the United States
- Location: 108 N. 3rd St. Marshalltown, Iowa
- Coordinates: 42°03′04″N 92°55′06″W
- Built: c. 1900
- NRHP reference No.: 79000916
- Added to NRHP: January 15, 1979

The C.H. Whitehead House is a historic residence located in Marshalltown, Iowa, United States. Whitehead was a Boone County, Iowa native who came to Marshalltown in 1898, where he established a women's and children's clothing store that is thought to be the first of its kind in Iowa. He had this home built around the turn of the 20th century. The house does not exemplify any one style, but is a compilation of several styles. The Queen Anne style is found in overall asymmetry of the main facade, especially the projecting bay and the porch's pediment, as both are off-centered. The Georgian Revival style is found in the rectangular form of the structure, the horizontal proportions, and the Adamesque details. The 17th century colonial architecture of New England is found in the way the second floor overhangs the first floor on the side elevations. The house was listed on the National Register of Historic Places in 1979.
