= Colfax Spring City Commercial Historic District =

Historic district in Iowa, United States

- Colfax Spring City Commercial; Historic District
- U.S. National Register of Historic Places
- U.S. Historic district
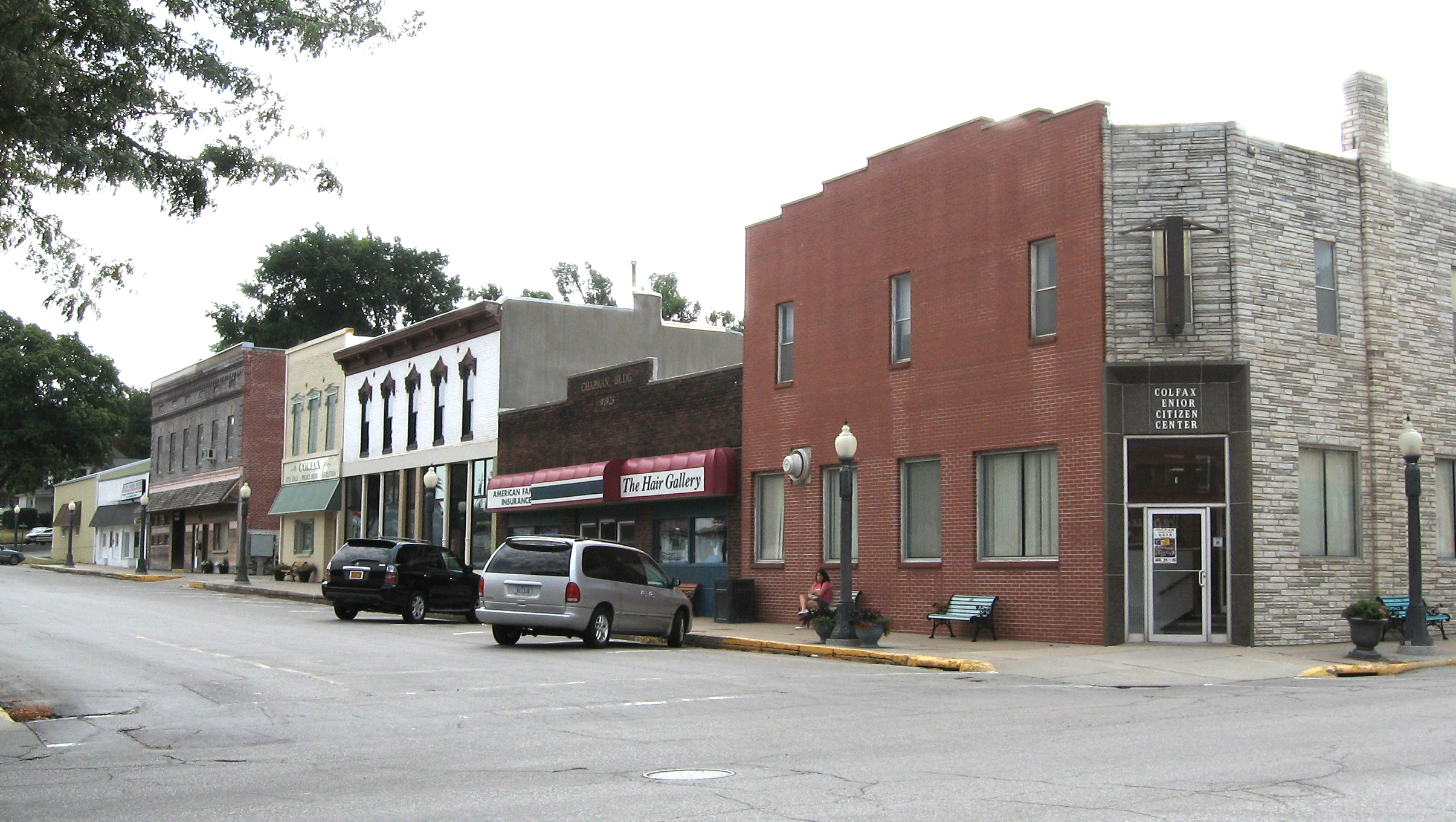
- East Howard and North Walnut Streets

- Location within Iowa Location within the United States
- Location: Roughly Division to Front Sts. between Elm & Locust Sts., Colfax, Iowa
- Coordinates: 41°40′39.6″N 93°14′42.4″W
- Area: about 11 acres (4.5 ha)
- NRHP reference No.: 100003065
- Added to NRHP: November 5, 2018

The Colfax Spring City Commercial Historic District is a nationally recognized historic district located in Colfax, Iowa, United States. It was listed on the National Register of Historic Places in 2018. At the time of its nomination it contained 48 resources, which included 28 contributing buildings, two contributing sites, two contributing structures, 12 non-contributing buildings, and four non-contributing structures. Colfax was platted in 1866 or 1867 as a railroad and farm-to-market town along the Chicago, Rock Island and Pacific Railroad. Coal mines were also located to the south of town. Mineral water was discovered in the area in 1875, which led to the development of the mineral water-based health industry in Colfax. The historic district represents the growth during this time period. After the health-related mineral water industry declined, Colfax expanded its farm-to-market economy in the late inter-war and post-World War II years.

The historic district covers Colfax's central business district, and includes civic buildings, churches, retail establishments, fraternal organizations, banks, automobile-related strictures, and two parks. The buildings are between one and three stories with most being one to two stories. Most of the buildings are of masonry construction with the former Presbyterian Church parsonage, the only house in the district, built of wood. It is also the only first generation building left in the district. Many of the other buildings from that era (1860s-1890s) were destroyed in fires or tornados. Architectural styles in the district include Italianate, Neoclassical, Tudor, Late Gothic Revival, Mediterranean Revival, and Modern.
