= Fred Maytag Park =

- Fred Maytag Park Historic District
- U.S. National Register of Historic Places
- U.S. Historic district
- Location within Iowa Location within the United States
- Location: 301 S. 22nd Ave., W. Newton, Iowa
- Coordinates: 41°41′18.8″N 93°03′20″W
- Area: 40 acres (16 ha)
- Architect: John Reed Fugard, et al.
- Architectural style: Late 19th and 20th Century Revivals; Modern Movement
- NRHP reference No.: 10000917
- Added to NRHP: November 10, 2010

Fred Maytag Park is a public park located in Newton, Iowa, United States. It was listed as a historic district on the National Register of Historic Places in 2010. At the time of its nomination it contained 39 resources, which included seven contributing buildings, nine contributing sites, eight contributing structures, four contributing objects, four non-contributing buildings, two non-contributing sites, three non-contributing structures, and two non-contributing objects. The park was a gift from F.L. Maytag, founder of the Maytag Company, to the people of Newton. It is significant as an example of a privately funded public park during the Great Depression. The 40-acre (16 ha) partial of land was acquired by Maytag in 1935. It had previously served as the fairgrounds owned by the Jasper County Agricultural Society. He made an agreement with the city council that the park would be privately owned and operated, but open for public use. The city was required to provide water and electricity. It remained a privately owned park until 1977 when it was conveyed to the city.

The park was laid out by the Chicago landscape design firm of Simonds, West, and Blair. Chicago architect and Newton native, John Reed Fugard, designed the swimming pool (1935), bathhouse (1935), amphitheater (1936), the Superintendent's residence and office (1936). Buildings that pre-date the establishment of the park include a pioneer log cabin (1848) and the livestock workshed (c. 1920). Both were part of the fairgrounds, and the log cabin is believed to be the last structure of its kind extant in Jasper County. Other historic elements include the north entry structures (1935), the roadway (1935), the flagpole area (1935), an incinerator (c. 1935), two stone privies (c. 1935), three stone fireplaces (1935), four concrete boundary pillars (1935, 1936), two parking areas (north, 1935; west 1936), the ice skating rink (1936), the north softball field (1936), the tennis courts (1936), children's playground (1936), and the west shelter house (1940)
