= Thaddeus Binford House =

Historic house in Iowa, United States

- U.S. National Register of Historic Places
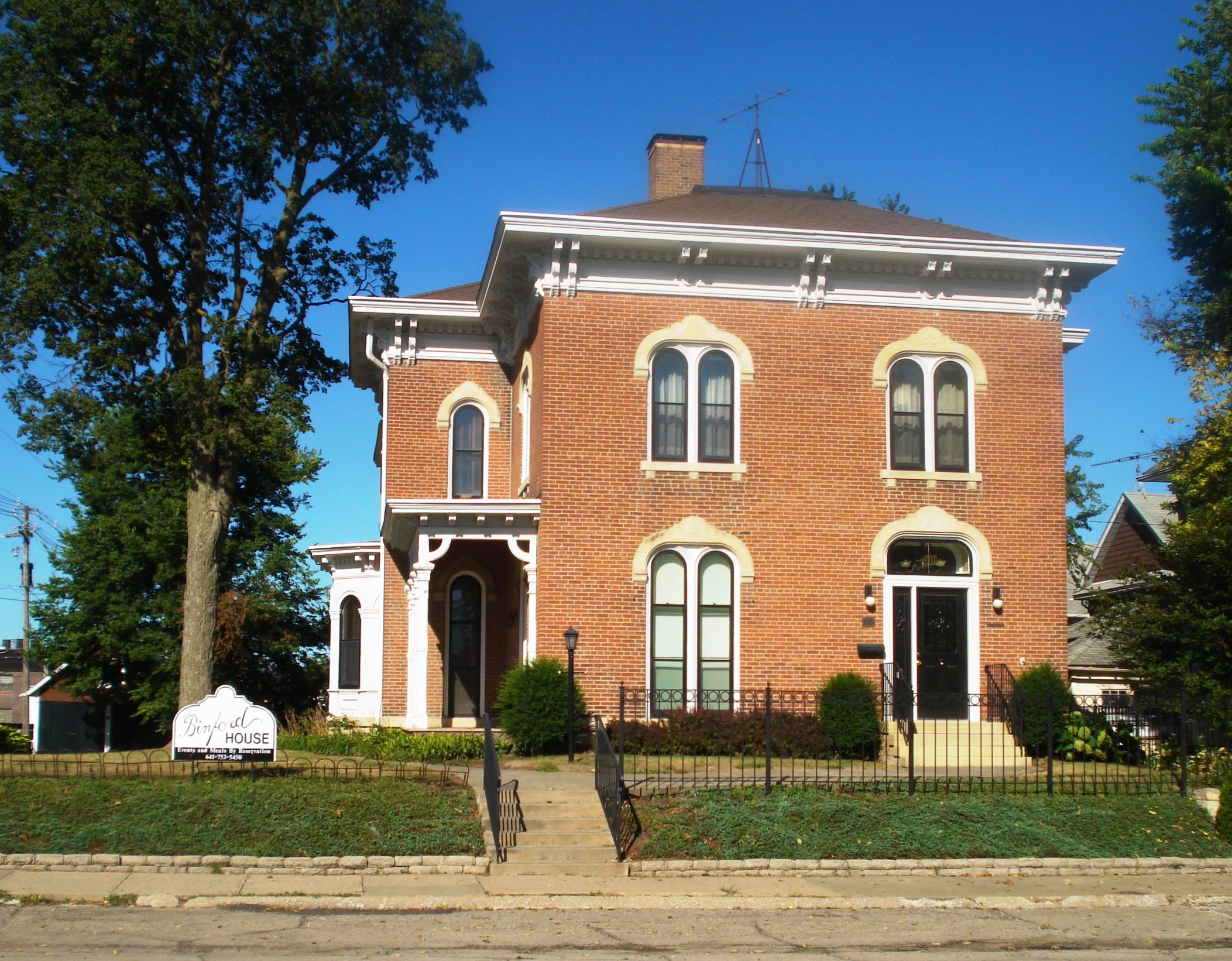

- Location within Iowa Location within the United States
- Location: 110 N. 2nd Ave. Marshalltown, Iowa
- Coordinates: 42°3′4″N 92°54′34″W
- Built: 1874
- Architectural style: Italianate
- NRHP reference No.: 84001286
- Added to NRHP: January 12, 1984

The Thaddeus Binford House is located in Marshalltown, Iowa. The house was built in 1874 for Thaddeus Binford, a wealthy Quaker attorney, and has been listed on the National Register of Historic Places since 1984.

== History ==
The Binford house was home to Jessie Florence Binford (1876–1966), daughter of Thaddeus and Angie (Beasley) Binford. Jessie Binford was a long-time Hull House resident and executive director of the Juvenile Protective Association. While at Hull House, Binford became interested in criminal justice and children's issues, becoming the Director of the Legal Aid Society when it was established at Hull House in 1906. She was known throughout the thirties, forties, and fifties for her efforts to fight the growing problem of illegal drugs. Binford was active in the fight to preserve the Harrison-Halsted neighborhood as a residential community and opposing the sale of Hull House property to the City of Chicago. Jessie Binford returned to her native Marshallown in 1963, giving away her family residence and choosing to spend her last three years in the nearby Hotel Tallcorn.
