= Emerson Hough Elementary School =

- U.S. National Register of Historic Places
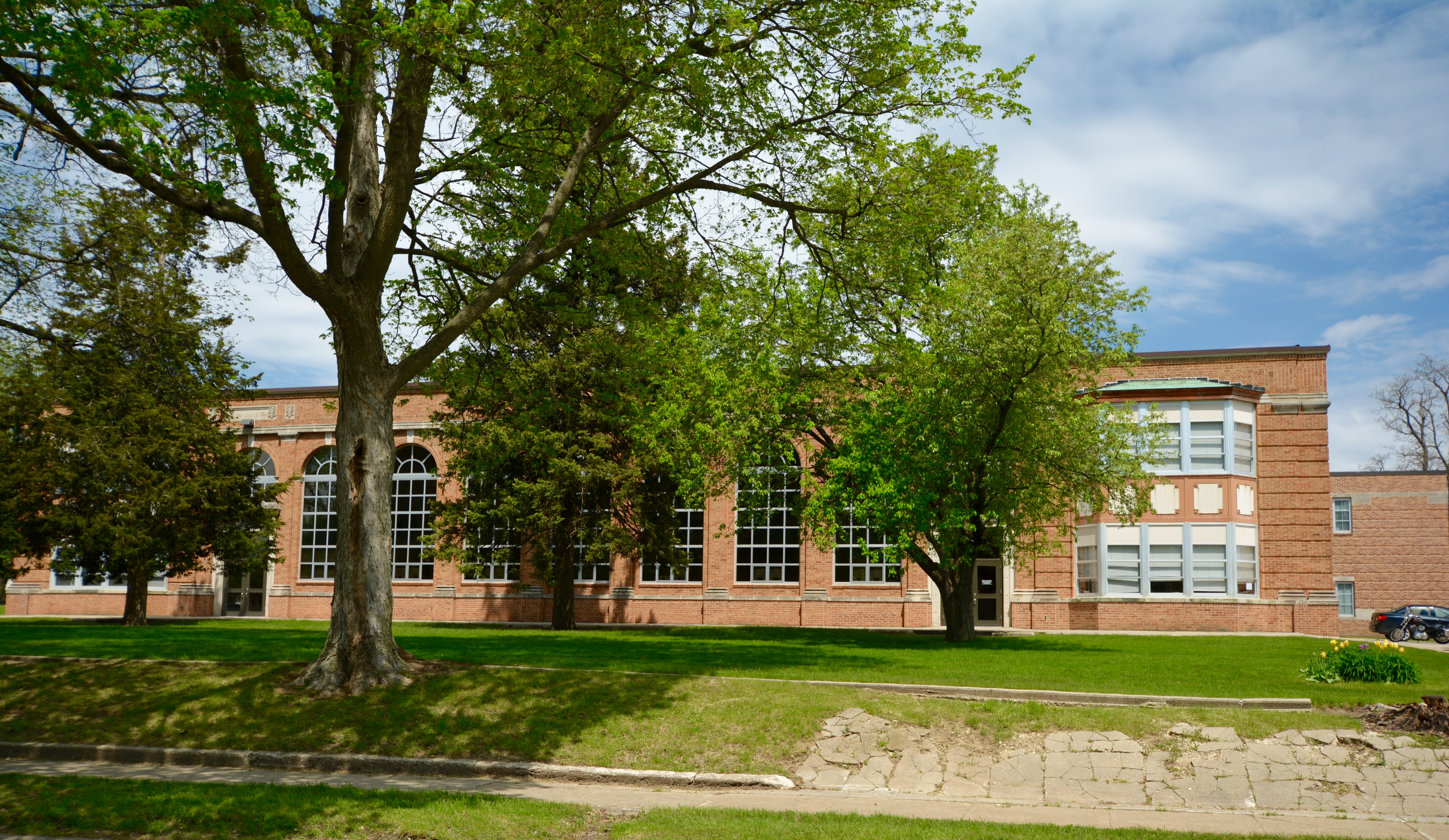

- Location within Iowa Location within the United States
- Location: 700 N. 4th Ave., E. Newton, Iowa
- Coordinates: 41°42′12″N 93°02′42″W
- Area: 2 acres (0.81 ha)
- Built: 1927
- Architectural style: Renaissance Revival
- MPS: Public Schools for Iowa: Growth and Change MPS
- NRHP reference No.: 02001232
- Added to NRHP: October 24, 2002

Emerson Hough Elementary School is a historic complex located in Newton, Iowa, United States. It was the first school in the state to employ the Platoon system of education where students spent half of their day studying fundamental subjects and the other half studying specialty subjects like art. Enrollment in the local public schools increased 57 percent between 1923 and 1927. The district could not afford to build the number schools required using a traditional education system, but they could house twice the number of students in a single building using the Platoon system. The school was named for Newton native Emerson Hough, who wrote novels about the American West and co-founded the Izaak Walton League. The two-story brick Italian Renaissance Revival structure was built in 1927. The building was expanded to the north in 1993, and at that time the interior was extensively renovated. Only the gymnasium and the front central hallway were not altered. The building was listed on the National Register of Historic Places in 2002.
