= August H. Bergman House =

Historic house in Iowa, United States

- U.S. National Register of Historic Places
- U.S. Historic district – Contributing property
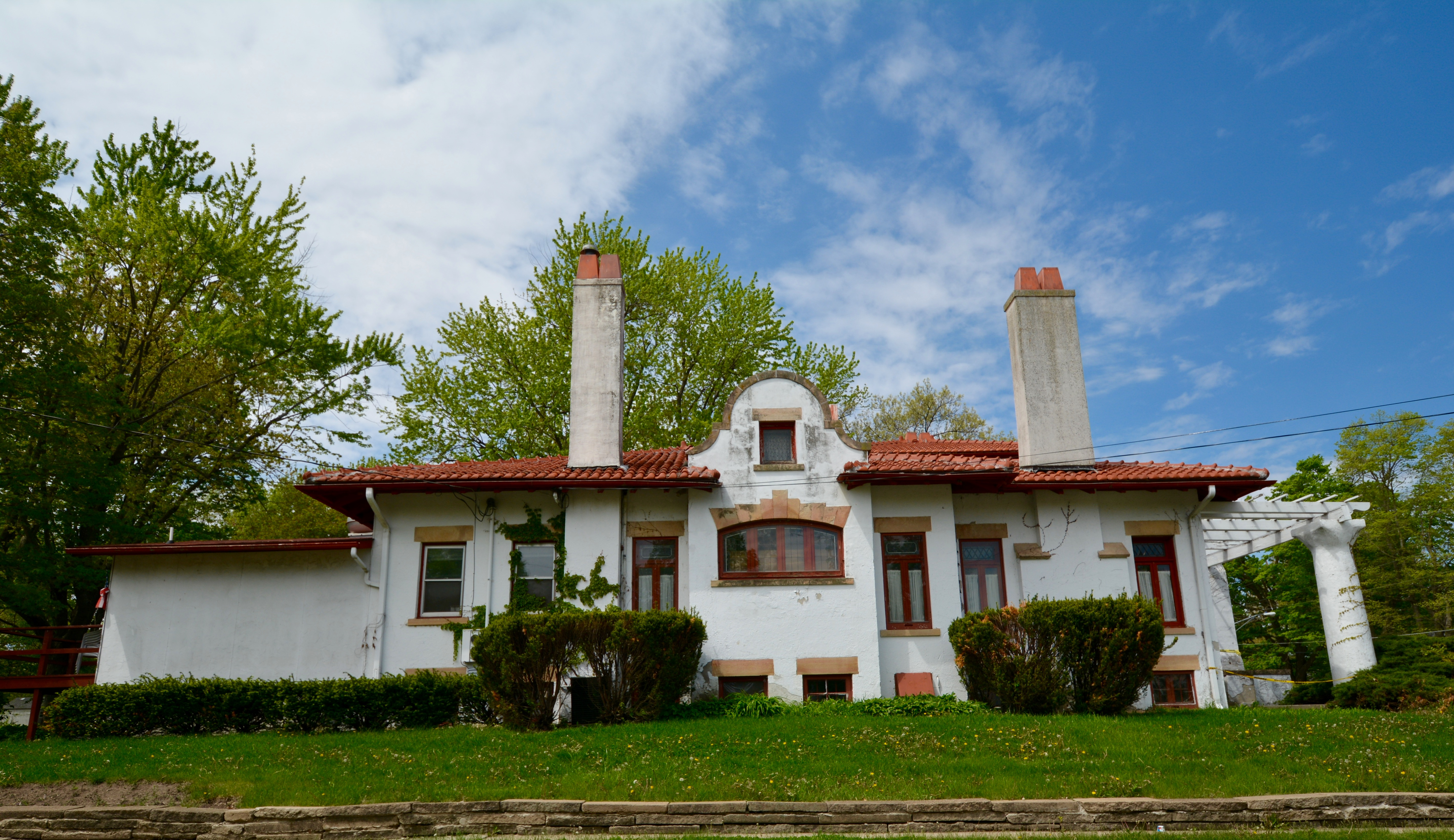

- Location within Iowa Location within the United States
- Location: 629 1st Ave., E. Newton, Iowa
- Coordinates: 41°41′57″N 93°02′44″W
- Area: less than one acre
- Built: 1909
- Built by: R.P. Rasmussen
- Architect: Proudfoot & Bird
- Architectural style: Mission Revival
- Part of: First Avenue East Historic District (ID100005888)
- MPS: Architectural Legacy of Proudfoot & Bird in Iowa MPS
- NRHP reference No.: 89000856
- Added to NRHP: July 13, 1989

The August H. Bergman House is a historic building located in Newton, Iowa, United States. Bergman was an investor in several washing machine companies, including Maytag. He was also a member of the Iowa Senate between 1922 and 1930. While there he was responsible for establishing the gasoline tax to support upgrading and paving the roads in the state. This is the only known example of a Mission Revival house designed by the prominent Des Moines architectural firm of Proudfoot & Bird. It was built by R. P. Rasmussen for $17,000 in 1909. It features a hipped red tile roof, stucco walls, stone trim, belvedere, Mission-shaped dormers, broad eaves, and a full-length single-story porch with a pergola.

The house was individually listed on the National Register of Historic Places in 1989. In 2020, it was included as a contributing property in the First Avenue East Historic District.
