= Dobbin Round Barn =

- U.S. National Register of Historic Places
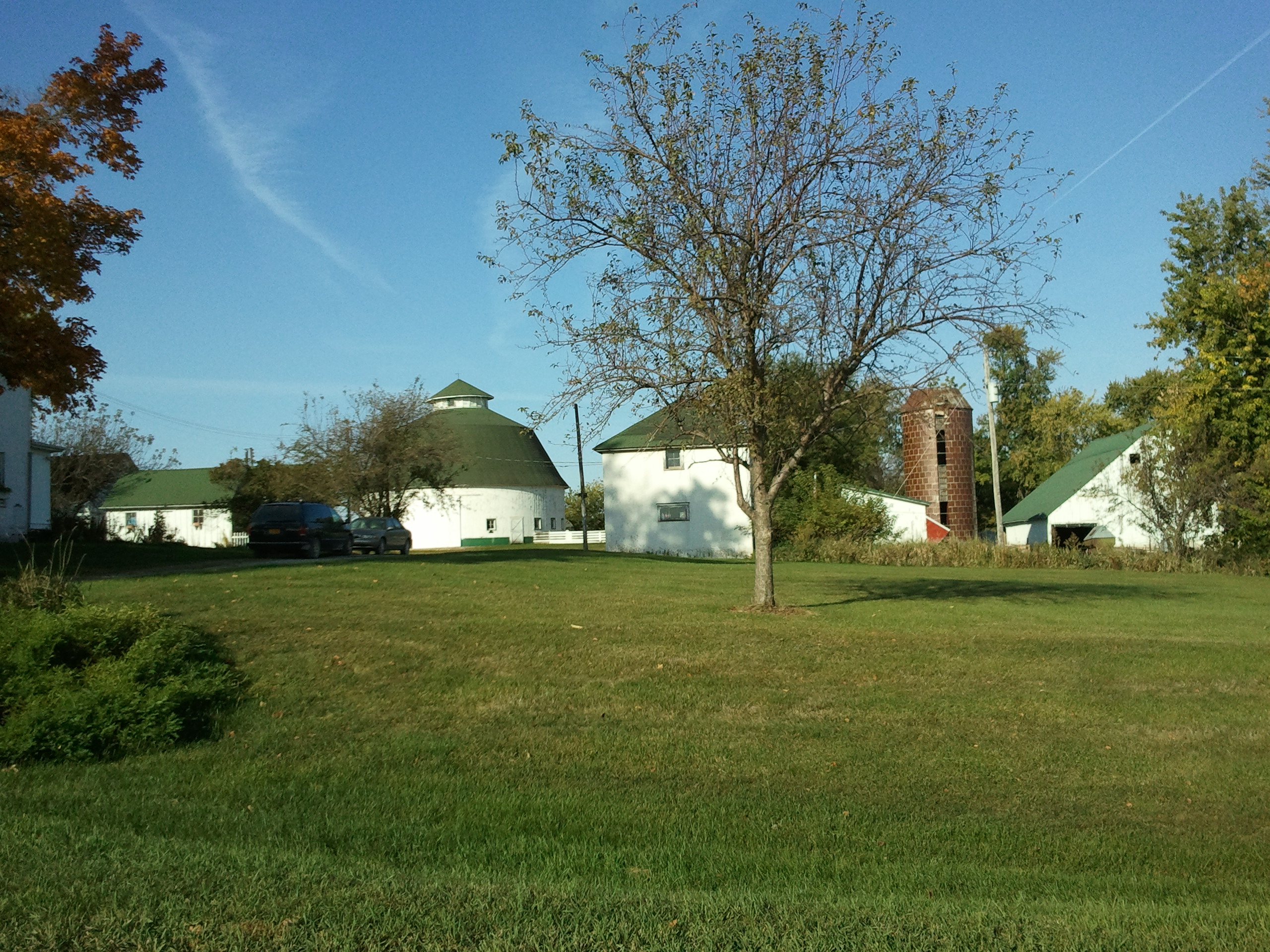

- Location within Iowa Location within the United States
- Location: Off County Road S52
- Nearest city: State Center, Iowa
- Coordinates: 41°59′6″N 93°11′58″W
- Area: less than one acre
- Built: 1919
- Built by: Ike Ingersol; Amos Thompson
- MPS: Iowa Round Barns: The Sixty Year Experiment TR
- NRHP reference No.: 86001459
- Added to NRHP: June 30, 1986

The Dobbin Round Barn is a historic building located near State Center in rural Marshall County, Iowa, United States. The true round barn was built in 1919 by Ike Ingersol and Amos Thomson. It was built from a Gordon Van Tine Co. kit for $6,000. It features white vertical siding, a two-pitch roof, louvered cupola and a 12-foot (3.7 m) diameter central silo. The barn has a diameter of 60 feet (18 m). It was built as a dairy and horse barn. The barn has been listed on the National Register of Historic Places since 1986. It is currently owned by Daniel Dobbin.
