= Newton, Iowa =

- City
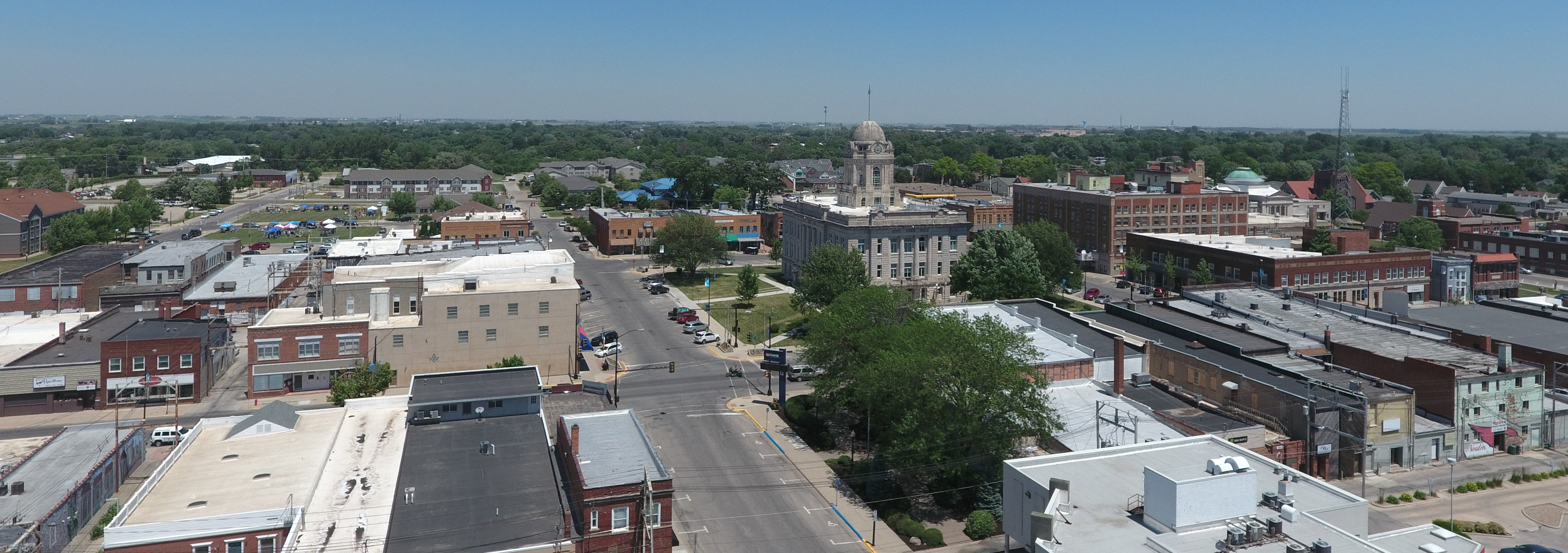
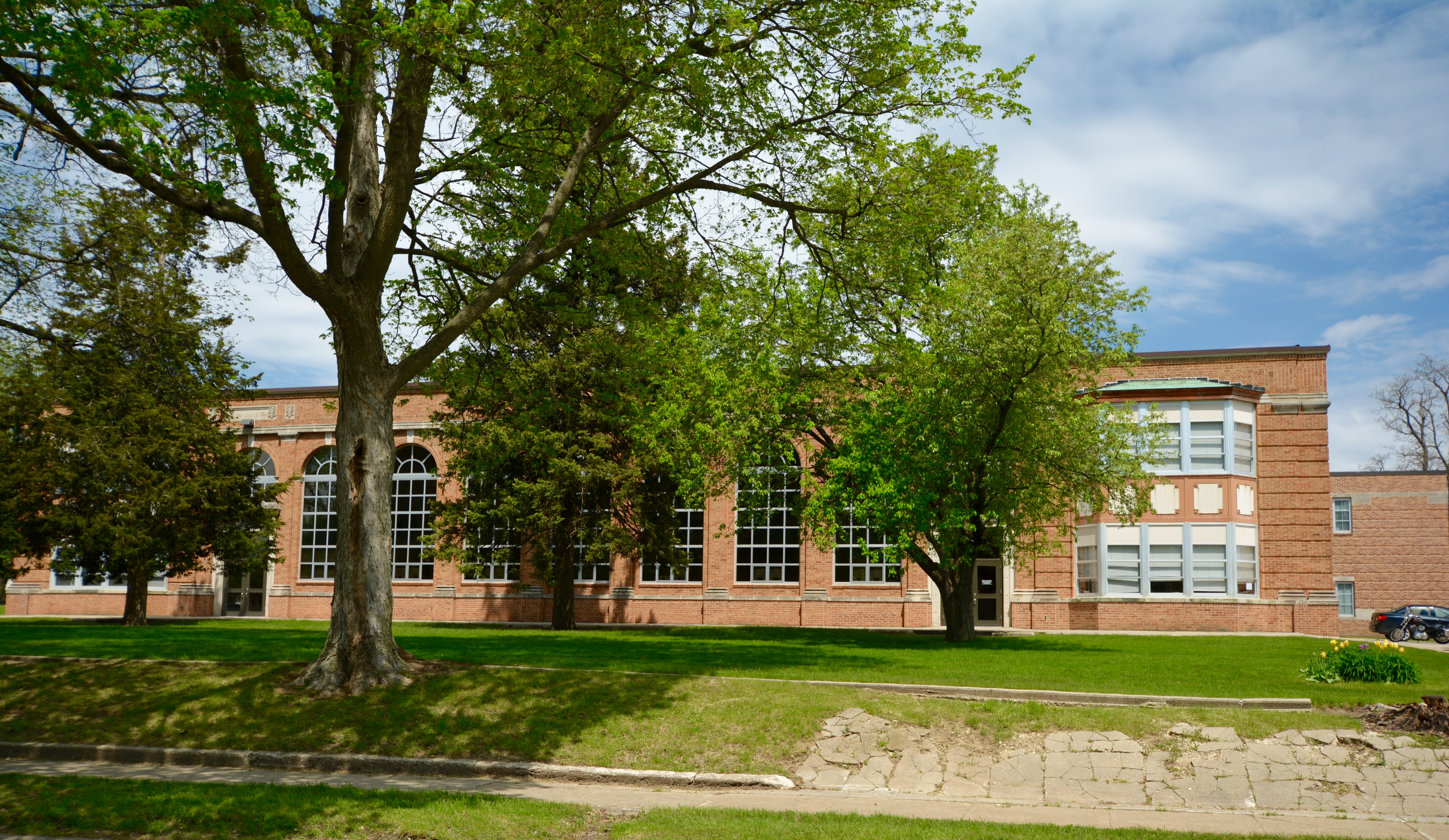
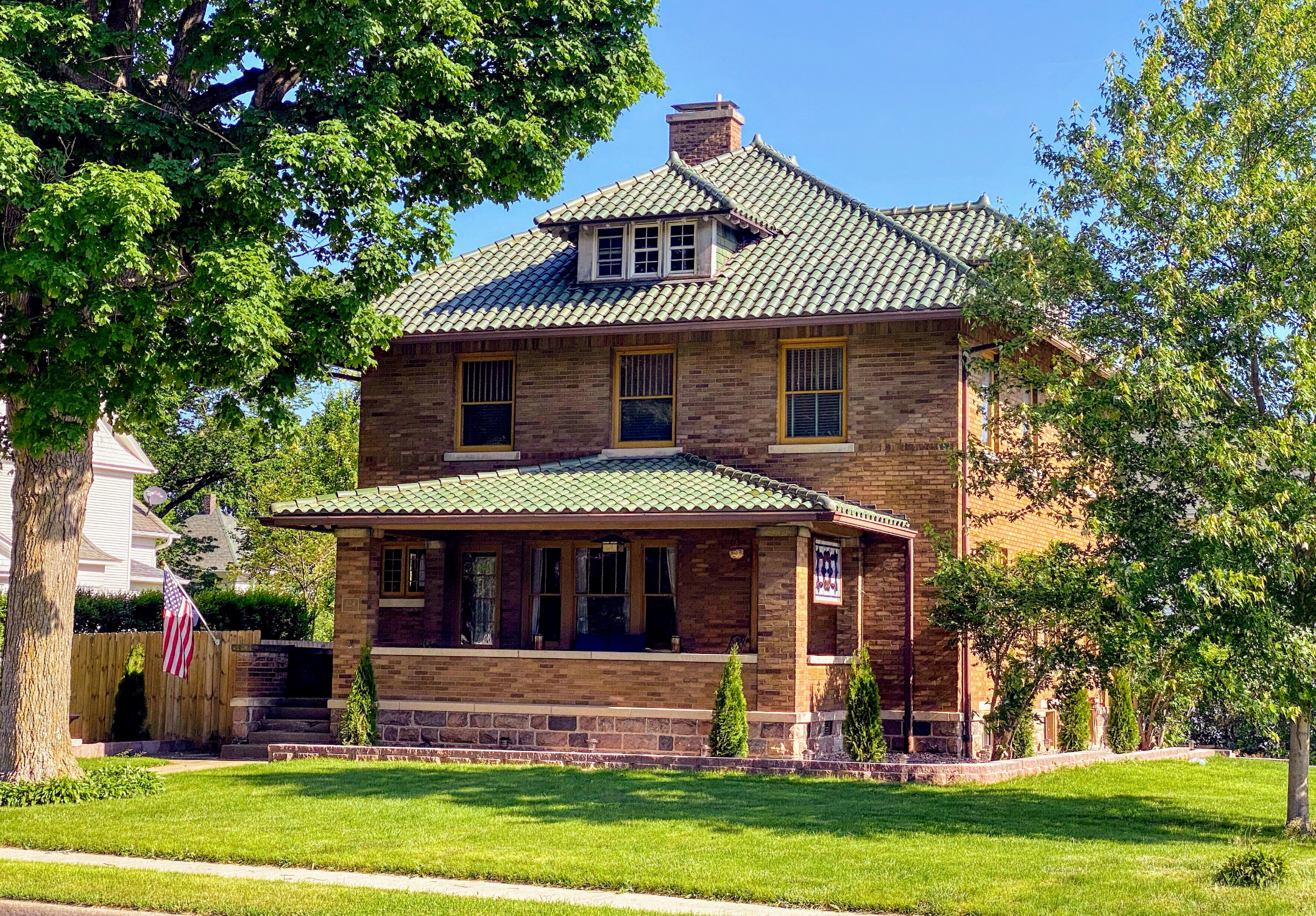
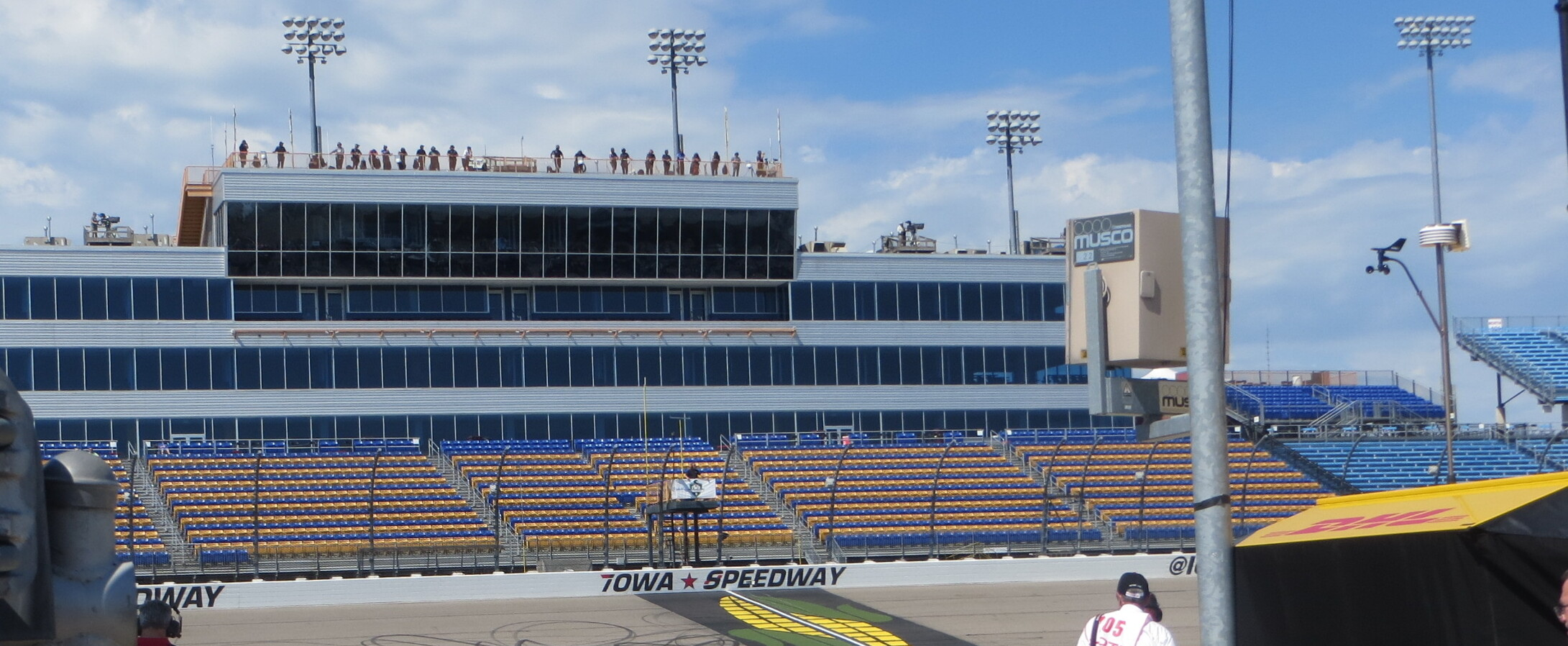
- Downtown Newton Emerson Hough Elementary School First Avenue East Historic District Iowa Speedway

- Logo

- Location of Newton, Iowa
- Coordinates: 41°41′55″N 93°2′49″W
- Country: United States
- State: Iowa
- County: Jasper

Area
  - Total: 11.34 sq mi (29.37 km^{2})
  - Land: 11.34 sq mi (29.37 km^{2})
  - Water: 0 sq mi (0.00 km^{2})
- Elevation: 950 ft (290 m)

Population (2020)
  - Total: 15,760
  - Rank: 26th in Iowa
  - Density: 1,390.0/sq mi (536.69/km^{2})
- Time zone: UTC-6 (Central (CST))
  - Summer (DST): UTC-5 (CDT)
- ZIP code: 50208
- Area code: 641
- FIPS code: 19-56505
- GNIS feature ID: 0459514
- Website: www.newtongov.org

Newton is the county seat of and the most populous city in Jasper County, Iowa, United States. Located 30 miles (48 km) east of Des Moines, Newton is in Central Iowa. As of the 2020 Census, the city population was 15,760. It is the home of Iowa Speedway and Maytag Dairy Farms.

== History ==
=== Early history ===
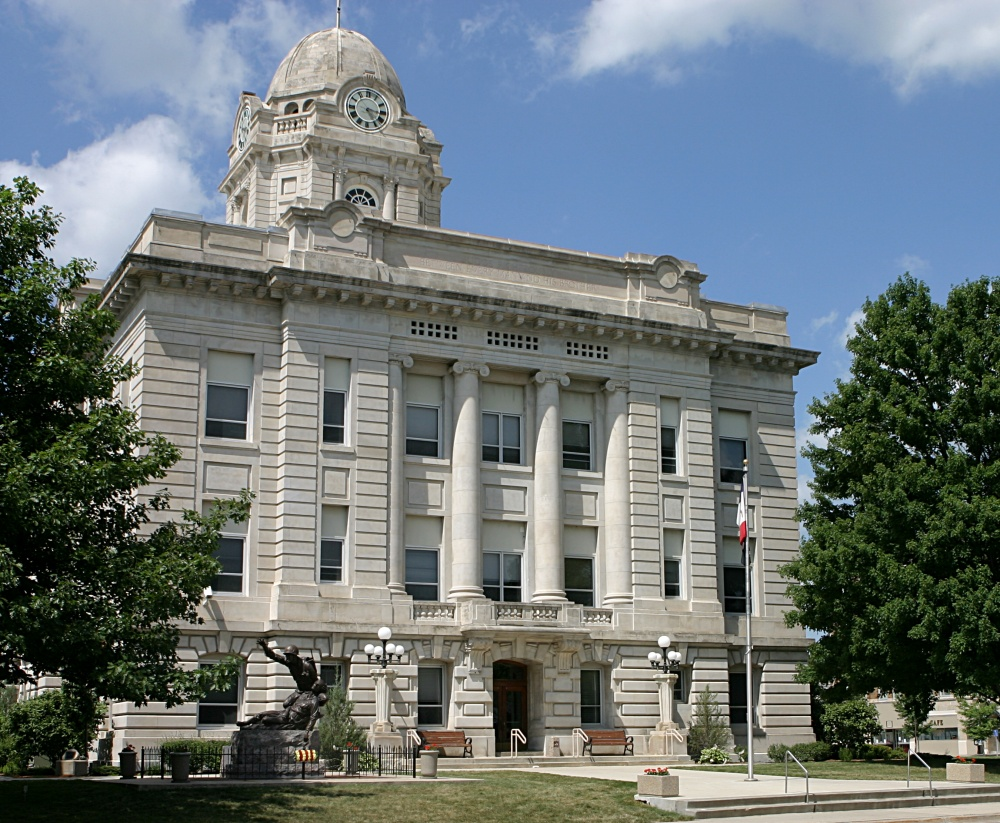
Jasper County Courthouse.

Newton was founded in 1846 as Newton City, then shortened to Newton in 1847 and incorporated as a city in 1857. It was named to pair with Jasper County, following a common American naming scheme at the time in honor of Revolutionary War soldiers John Newton and William Jasper. In the late 19th century, Newton's growth was fueled by the development of coal mines in the region. The first significant mine in the area was the Couch mine of the Jasper County Coal and Railway Company, opened in the 1870s. For a while, it was the largest mine in the county, producing 70 tons per day. William Snooks opened a mine near Newton in 1886. In the early 20th century, large scale mining in the Newton area had declined, but there were still several mines in the area that were worked intermittently.

=== Maytag and the era of growth ===
In the 20th century, Newton was a manufacturing community, much of its growth derived from the washing machine industry. Its most distinctive landmark, the Jasper County Courthouse, was built in 1911.

Newton entered the national stage in 1938 when martial law was declared during a strike at the Maytag Washing Machine Company. Iowa governor Nelson Kraschel ordered the Iowa National Guard to protect the company with tanks and machine guns ready against the workers. With the backing of four troops (companies) of the 113th Cavalry Regiment, Maytag company beat the strike and forced workers to return to work with a 10% pay cut.

At the conclusion of World War II, the Maytag Washing Machine Company expanded its operations in Newton, becoming the Maytag Corporation. Known for its dependable line of washing machines and clothes dryers, the company later persuaded the town of Newton to change the name of its headquarters address in the city to "One Dependability Square." In 2001, a decision to cut labor costs resulted in a reduction of the labor force at the Newton plant in favor of newer Maytag facilities in Mexico. Layoffs at the Newton plant continued through 2005. Whirlpool's acquisition of Maytag in early 2006 led to speculation over the future of Maytag operations in Newton. On May 10, 2006, Whirlpool announced that it would close the Newton plant and corporate offices in the fall of 2007. The plant employed about 1,000 workers and the corporate offices employed about 800 at the time of the announcement.

In January 2007, Whirlpool said in a statement that it sold most of the Maytag headquarters complex to Iowa Telecommunications Services Inc., a Newton-based telephone company which would use the complex to consolidate employees in a single location.

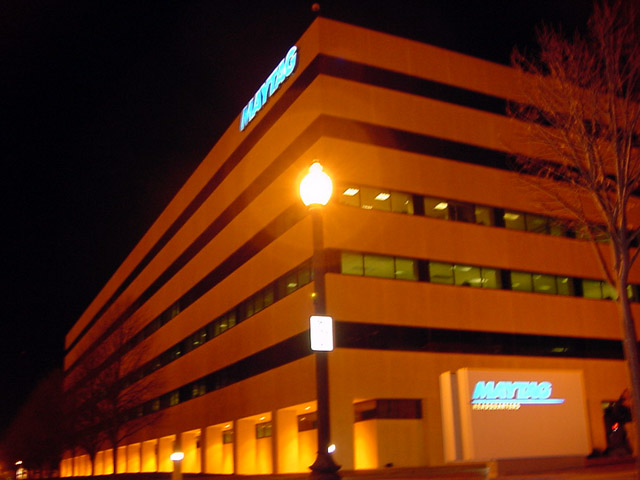
Former headquarters of the Maytag Corporation, sold to Newton Enterprises in April 2012

Although the company did not disclose financial details, Newton economic development officials said Iowa Telecom paid $1.5 million for the buildings assessed at more than $12 million. The Maytag plant officially ended production on October 25, 2007.

=== "Newton's future" and the rebound after Maytag ===
After Maytag announced its departure, community leaders and City administration worked together to develop a plan to diversify Newton's economy. After the Maytag plant closed, unemployment skyrocketed—rising to almost 10%. In 2010, Jasper County had the highest unemployment rate of Iowa's 99 counties at 8.2%. However, in the following years, the unemployment rate dropped considerably—down to 5.4% in 2013. More impressively, Newton's population did not drop following the departure of Maytag. Newton has had a steady population of about 15,000 since the 1960s.

Between 2007 and 2017, the following companies started in or moved to Newton: Underwriter's Laboratory, Trinity Structural Towers, TPI Composites, Aureon, Walter G. Anderson, the Iowa Speedway, Health Enterprises, Engineered Plastics Company, Pact Manufacturing, Advanced Wheel Sales, and Hawkeye Stages.

Legacy Plaza, the former Maytag corporate campus, contains eight buildings dating back to the early 1900s. The site was donated to Des Moines Area Community College (DMACC) by Reza Kargarzadeh in 2016.

==== Green manufacturing and sustainability ====
One of the industrial sectors Newton has attracted in recent years is green manufacturing. In December 2007, TPI Composites announced plans to open a plant to manufacture massive wind turbine blades, which are now in production. Today, TPI Composites employs over 1,100 people and has expanded its operations by 100,000 square feet as they began manufacturing composite bus bodies with Proterra.

Additionally, Trinity Structural Towers, a company which manufactures wind turbine towers, opened in 2008. President Barack Obama visited the Trinity Structural Towers plant on April 22, 2009, that year's Earth Day. While at the factory in Newton, the President said that he traveled to the factory to usher in "a new era of energy exploration in America."

Newton was awarded the National Sustainable Community of the Year Award (Small City Category) by Siemens and the US Chamber of Commerce in 2010 for its successful, pro-active approach to recovery.

==== Newton's future: a comprehensive plan ====
In 2012, the Newton City Council passed "Newton's Future: A Comprehensive Plan." The Comprehensive Plan was written with the input of Newton citizens and reflects the community's goals for the future; the top goals identified in the plan were to grow Newton's population with an emphasis toward targeting young families, increase employment opportunities, improve the City's curb appeal, and fill vacant buildings and increase local shopping options.

== Arts and culture ==
Newton is passionate in its support of the arts and culture.

=== Visual arts and sculpture ===
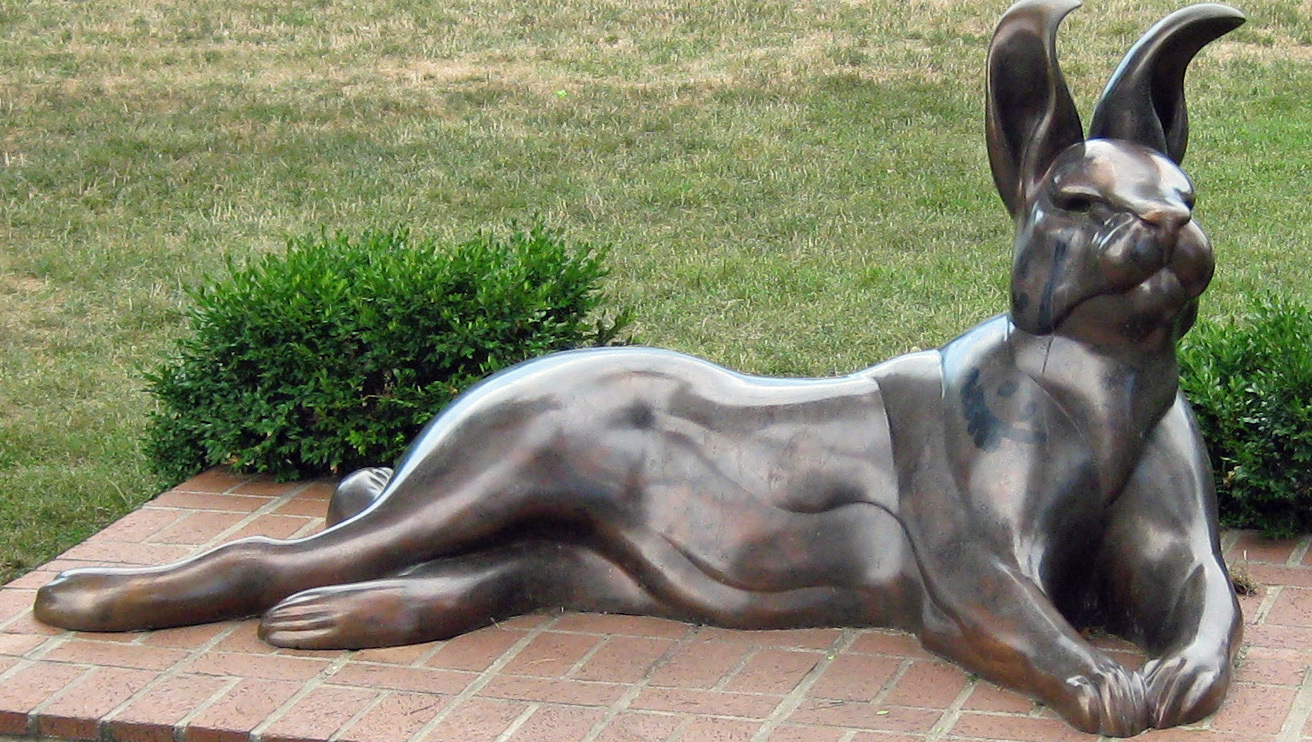
"International Harvester AKA Harvey" a public art sculpture in Maytag Park, Newton, Iowa.

Newton has an active arts community, with several non-profit organizations dedicated to the arts and many artists residing in the city.

The Iowa Sculpture Festival was an annual event hosted in Newton which began in 2002. The purpose and goal of the Iowa Sculpture Festival is to celebrate the development and growth of sculpture as an art form and to feature artists who create sculptures. The weekend-long event featured both local and internationally accomplished artists. The annual event ended in 2017.

Newton features more than 100 displays of public art with sculptures and painted murals throughout the community. The Iowa Sculpture Festival Committee sponsors a self-guided year-round sculpture and mural tour.

The Centre for Arts and Artists opened in Newton in 2005. The Centre for Arts and Artists is composed of 10 resident artist studios, a clay and kiln room, a therapeutic art room for children, a classroom, an extensive art and sculpture collection as well as a gift shop. Classes for all ages are taught at the Centre throughout the year.

=== Performing arts ===
In addition to having an active visual arts community, Newton also has an active music and theater community. Each summer, Newton hosts the Bowlful of Blues, a blues festival at the Maytag Bowl featuring renowned blues artists from across the county such as John Primer, Walter Trout, Shaun Murphy, Willie Kent, and others.

Additionally, the City of Newton puts on free weekly concerts at the Maytag Bowl throughout the summer in an event called "Concerts at the Bowl." This event features local bands of all genres. The Newton City Band, a full concert band composed of Newton citizens, also performs at this event.

The Newton Community Theater performs several shows each year ranging from large-cast musicals, such as Les Misérables, to small cast ensemble plays, such as The Dixie Swim Club.

=== Historic preservation ===
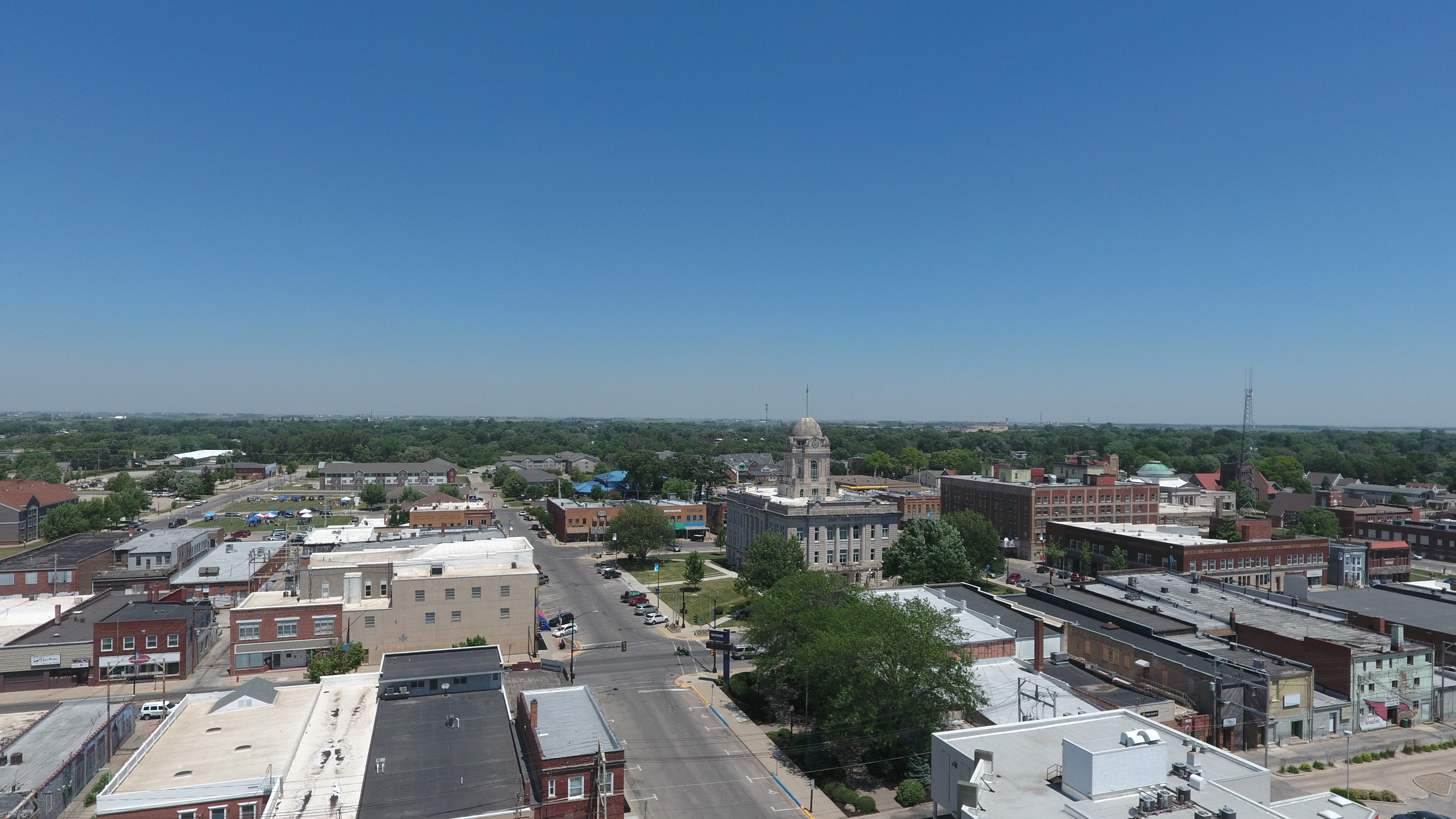
An aerial image of downtown Newton.

In February 2014, Newton was selected to take part in the Main Street Iowa program, which is a coordinating program for the Main Street America program and part of the Iowa Economic Development Authority. Newton Main Street is a 501(c)3 organization with a goal of economic development within the context of historic preservation. In September 2014, Newton's downtown was designated to the National Register of Historic Places. The district has 87 properties within it.

The Fred Maytag Park Historic District, which includes Maytag Bowl, Maytag Park and Maytag Pool, was listed on the National Register of Historic Places in November 2010.

Newton has several other places listed on the National Register of Historic Places including the Thomas Arthur House, August H. Bergman House, Emerson Hough Elementary School, the Jasper County Courthouse, and St. Stephen's Episcopal Church.

The Jasper County Historical Museum is located on the southwest est side of Newton and features historical artifacts from throughout Newton's history, including many early-model washing machines manufactured by Maytag. The museum is managed by the Jasper County Historical Society.

=== Other arts and culture ===
Newton began hosting Newton Fest in 2015. The annual celebration is meant to celebrate the arts, food, music, history and more.

Newton also hosts the Miss Iowa USA and Miss Teen Iowa USA Pageants annually. The winners of these competitions go on to represent Iowa at the Miss USA Pageants.

Newton is home to one of America's first business aircraft. The aircraft was a Travel Air 6000 owned by Harry Ogg, owner of the Automatic Washing Machine Company and was named "Smiling Thru".

=== Entertainment, recreation and sports ===
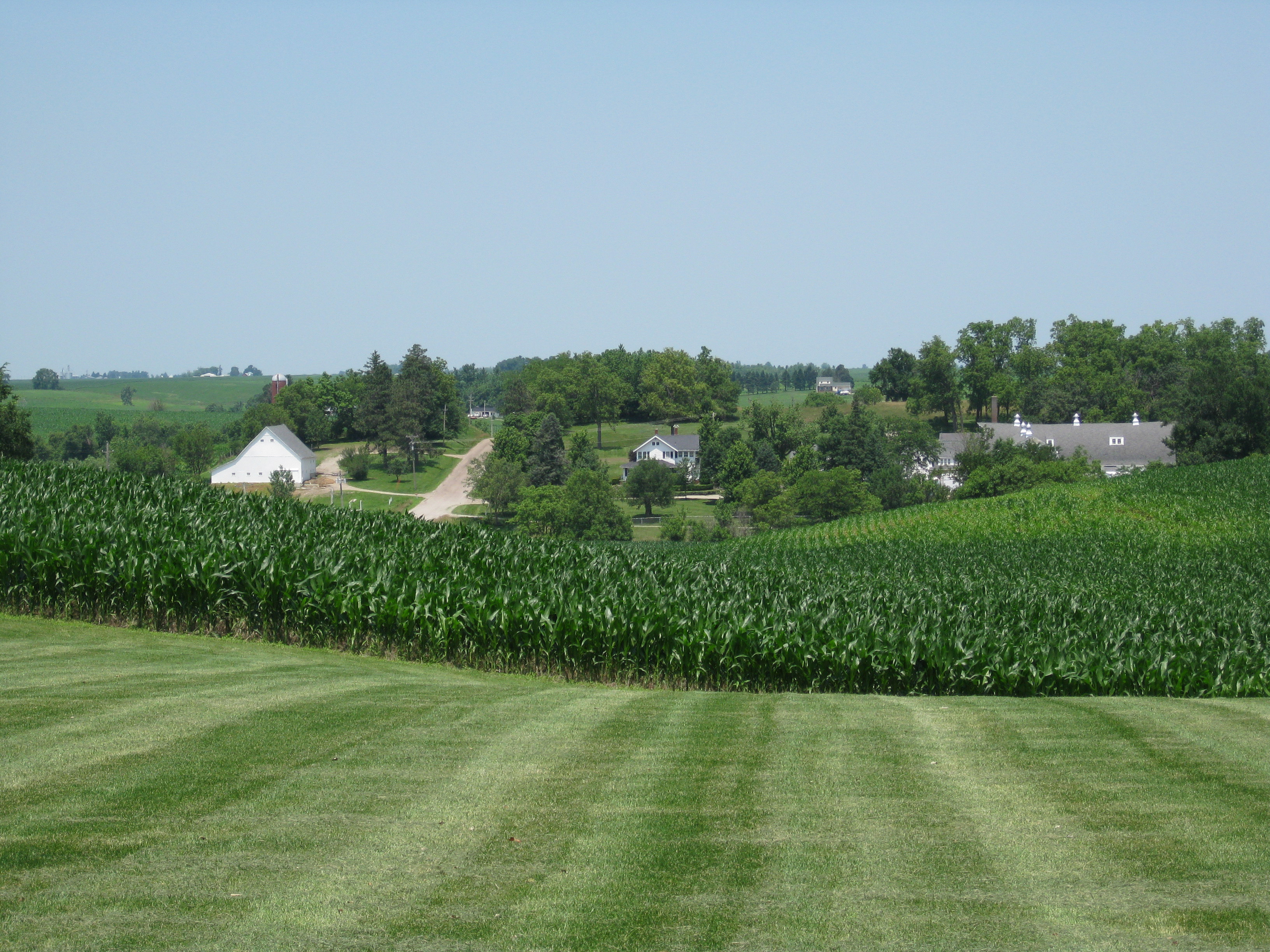
View of Maytag Dairy Farms from the visitor center.

In 1919, E.H. Maytag, the son of Maytag Appliance company founder F.L. Maytag, purchased a single Holstein cow to provide fresh clean milk to his children. Upon E.H.’s death in 1940, his sons Fred and Robert Maytag assumed leadership of the farms and Fred pursued his idea of creating a uniquely American blue cheese made from cow's milk. Maytag Dairy Farms collaborated with Iowa State University to pioneer the first great American blue cheese that could compete with classic European cheeses such as Roquefort made from sheep's milk. The cheese plant and caves were completed a year later and the first wheels of Maytag Blue Cheese were formed in October 1941. 77 years after Fred made the first wheels of Maytag Blue Cheese, the leadership of the company is transitioning to his grandchildren—the great-grandchildren of E.H. Maytag.

Newton has two historic movie theaters that are still in operation. The Valle Drive in is one of four drive-in theaters still in operation in Iowa. The Valle Drive in is the oldest of all of these theaters, having opened in 1948. The Capitol II Theater is located in the historic downtown district of Newton and has been in operation since April 1927; originally operating as a vaudeville theater.

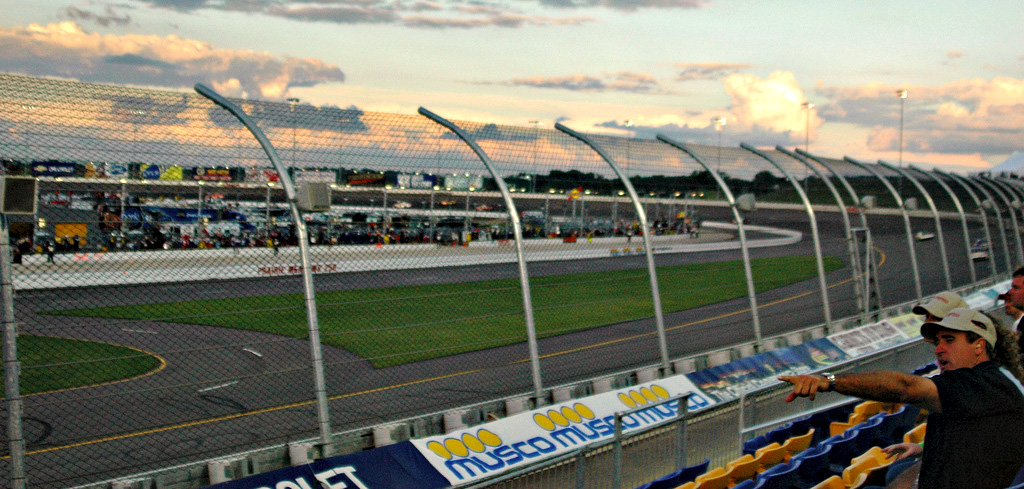
An image from the grandstand at Iowa Speedway.

Newton is home to Iowa Speedway, a 7/8-mile racing track purchased by NASCAR in 2014. It is the only short track owned by NASCAR west of the Mississippi River. The track hosts a series of races throughout the summer, including NASCAR Cup Series, IndyCar Series, Indy Lights and ARCA Menards Series races.

The Newton High School completes in class 4A athletics through the Iowa High School Athletic Association. The mascot of the high school is a Cardinal. The IHSAA athletics that Newton participates in includes: baseball, basketball, bowling, cross country, football, golf, soccer, softball, swimming, tennis, track & field, volleyball, and wrestling.

Newton is home to several parks and recreation areas. The City maintains 13 City parks and recreational areas, including the flagship park of the community, Maytag Park. Maytag Park is on the National Registrar of Historic Places. Amenities at Maytag Park include the Maytag Bowl—a historic bandshell, a public swimming pool, and a disc golf course. In addition to the City parks, Project AWAKE, a local non-profit organization, maintains the Newton Arboretum and Botanical Gardens as well as Sersland Park, a downtown park. The Newton Arboretum and Botanical Gardens occupies six acres of land and features over 150 species of trees, a rose garden, a butterfly garden, a water garden, and a native prairie.

==== Death of Rocky Marciano ====
On August 31, 1969, world boxing champion Rocky Marciano and two other occupants died when their airplane crashed in Newton. This was the third of a series of airplane accidents or incidents in Iowa involving celebrities, after a 1959 accident in Clear Lake and a 1960 incident in Carroll that involved a plane carrying the Los Angeles Lakers basketball team.

== Education ==
The Newton Community School District offers public K – 12 schools.

Newton Christian School offers private Preschool to 8th grade.

DMACC Newton Campus Community College

== Geography ==
According to the United States Census Bureau, the city has a total area of 11.19 square miles (28.98 km^{2}), all land.

=== Streets and addresses ===
Newton is divided into four quadrants: 1st Avenue divides the north and south segments of Newton, and 1st Street divides the east and west segments. Roads labeled as avenues run east and west, while roads labeled as streets run north and south. Newton's street numbering system also extends into rural Jasper County.

A typical street name would appear "E 5th St S". The east or west label comes first, followed by the street, then followed by the north or south label. This example indicates the street is in the southeast quadrant of Newton.

A typical avenue name would appear "N 5th Ave W". In the case of avenues, the north or south label comes first, followed by the avenue, and then followed by the east or west label. This example indicates the avenue is in the northwest quadrant of Newton.

All addresses within Newton fall within the 50208 ZIP Code.

== Climate ==
According to the Köppen Climate Classification system, Newton has a hot-summer humid continental climate, abbreviated "Dfa" on climate maps.

Climate data for Newton, Iowa, 1991–2020 normals, extremes 1893–present
Month	Jan	Feb	Mar	Apr	May	Jun	Jul	Aug	Sep	Oct	Nov	Dec	Year
Record high °F (°C)	68 (20)	72 (22)	90 (32)	96 (36)	99 (37)	102 (39)	107 (42)	105 (41)	100 (38)	95 (35)	80 (27)	74 (23)	107 (42)
Mean maximum °F (°C)	50.9 (10.5)	56.8 (13.8)	72.4 (22.4)	82.4 (28.0)	89.0 (31.7)	93.3 (34.1)	96.0 (35.6)	93.8 (34.3)	91.0 (32.8)	83.4 (28.6)	68.8 (20.4)	55.8 (13.2)	97.0 (36.1)
Mean daily maximum °F (°C)	28.0 (−2.2)	33.0 (0.6)	46.4 (8.0)	60.4 (15.8)	71.4 (21.9)	81.2 (27.3)	84.6 (29.2)	82.5 (28.1)	76.2 (24.6)	62.5 (16.9)	46.7 (8.2)	33.6 (0.9)	58.9 (14.9)
Daily mean °F (°C)	19.2 (−7.1)	23.7 (−4.6)	36.1 (2.3)	48.8 (9.3)	60.6 (15.9)	70.6 (21.4)	74.2 (23.4)	72.0 (22.2)	64.3 (17.9)	51.5 (10.8)	37.0 (2.8)	25.2 (−3.8)	48.6 (9.2)
Mean daily minimum °F (°C)	10.7 (−11.8)	14.4 (−9.8)	25.8 (−3.4)	37.1 (2.8)	49.8 (9.9)	60.0 (15.6)	63.8 (17.7)	61.4 (16.3)	52.4 (11.3)	40.4 (4.7)	27.3 (−2.6)	16.9 (−8.4)	38.3 (3.5)
Mean minimum °F (°C)	−9.9 (−23.3)	−4.8 (−20.4)	6.0 (−14.4)	23.7 (−4.6)	37.1 (2.8)	49.6 (9.8)	55.2 (12.9)	52.9 (11.6)	39.3 (4.1)	25.9 (−3.4)	11.4 (−11.4)	−3.1 (−19.5)	−13.3 (−25.2)
Record low °F (°C)	−31 (−35)	−34 (−37)	−18 (−28)	9 (−13)	23 (−5)	38 (3)	44 (7)	37 (3)	23 (−5)	13 (−11)	−8 (−22)	−22 (−30)	−34 (−37)
Average precipitation inches (mm)	0.93 (24)	1.10 (28)	2.06 (52)	3.44 (87)	4.84 (123)	5.01 (127)	3.93 (100)	4.30 (109)	3.59 (91)	2.66 (68)	2.01 (51)	1.27 (32)	35.14 (892)
Average snowfall inches (cm)	9.2 (23)	6.0 (15)	4.5 (11)	0.8 (2.0)	0.0 (0.0)	0.0 (0.0)	0.0 (0.0)	0.0 (0.0)	0.0 (0.0)	0.3 (0.76)	1.6 (4.1)	6.3 (16)	28.7 (71.86)
Average precipitation days (≥ 0.01 in)	6.4	6.3	8.0	10.1	11.8	10.5	8.3	8.8	7.4	7.6	6.2	6.9	98.3
Average snowy days (≥ 0.1 in)	4.1	3.7	1.7	0.4	0.0	0.0	0.0	0.0	0.0	0.2	0.8	4.0	14.9
Source 1: NOAA
Source 2: National Weather Service

== Demographics ==
Historical population
Census	Pop.	Note	%±
1860	1,617		—
1870	1,983		22.6%
1880	2,607		31.5%
1890	2,564		−1.6%
1900	3,682		43.6%
1910	4,616		25.4%
1920	6,627		43.6%
1930	11,560		74.4%
1940	10,462		−9.5%
1950	11,723		12.1%
1960	15,381		31.2%
1970	15,619		1.5%
1980	15,292		−2.1%
1990	14,789		−3.3%
2000	15,579		5.3%
2010	15,254		−2.1%
2020	15,760		3.3%
2025 (est.)	15,741		−0.1%
U.S. Decennial Census

=== 2020 census ===
As of the 2020 census, Newton had a population of 15,760, with 6,750 households and 3,991 families. The population density was 1,396.4 inhabitants per square mile (539.2/km^{2}). There were 7,312 housing units at an average density of 647.9 per square mile (250.1/km^{2}).

97.4% of residents lived in urban areas, while 2.6% lived in rural areas.

Among households, 26.0% had children under the age of 18 living with them. Of all households, 41.9% were married-couple households, 8.2% were cohabiting-couple households, 20.0% were households with a male householder and no spouse or partner present, and 29.8% were households with a female householder and no spouse or partner present. Non-families made up 40.9% of all households. About 34.7% of all households were made up of individuals, and 15.8% had someone living alone who was 65 years of age or older.

Of the city's housing units, 7.7% were vacant. The homeowner vacancy rate was 2.7% and the rental vacancy rate was 8.1%.

The median age was 41.6 years. 24.4% of residents were under the age of 20; 5.4% were between the ages of 20 and 24; 23.7% were from 25 to 44; 24.7% were from 45 to 64; and 21.9% were 65 years of age or older. 22.1% of residents were under the age of 18. The gender makeup of the city was 48.2% male and 51.8% female. For every 100 females there were 93.1 males, and for every 100 females age 18 and over there were 90.3 males age 18 and over.

Racial composition as of the 2020 census
Race	Number	Percent
White	14,115	89.6%
Black or African American	449	2.8%
American Indian and Alaska Native	75	0.5%
Asian	125	0.8%
Native Hawaiian and Other Pacific Islander	13	0.1%
Some other race	205	1.3%
Two or more races	778	4.9%
Hispanic or Latino (of any race)	606	3.8%

=== 2010 census ===
As of the census of 2010, there were 15,254 people, 6,668 households, and 4,047 families residing in the city. The population density was 1,363.2 inhabitants per square mile (526.3/km^{2}). There were 7,339 housing units at an average density of 655.9 per square mile (253.2/km^{2}). The racial makeup of the city was 96.7% White, 0.7% African American, 0.3% Native American, 0.6% Asian, 0.4% from other races, and 1.2% from two or more races. Hispanic or Latino of any race were 1.7% of the population.

There were 6,668 households, of which 28.0% had children under the age of 18 living with them, 44.6% were married couples living together, 11.5% had a female householder with no husband present, 4.6% had a male householder with no wife present, and 39.3% were non-families. 34.6% of all households were made up of individuals, and 15.9% had someone living alone who was 65 years of age or older. The average household size was 2.24 and the average family size was 2.85.

The median age in the city was 41.6 years. 22.7% of residents were under the age of 18; 7.8% were between the ages of 18 and 24; 23.8% were from 25 to 44; 26.4% were from 45 to 64; and 19.3% were 65 years of age or older. The gender makeup of the city was 47.8% male and 52.2% female.

=== 2000 census ===
As of the census of 2000, there were 15,579 people, 6,713 households, and 4,269 families residing in the city. The population density was 1,518.9 inhabitants per square mile (586.5/km^{2}). There were 7,162 housing units at an average density of 698.3 per square mile (269.6/km^{2}). The racial makeup of the city was 97.55% White, 0.60% Asian, 0.39% African American, 0.22% Native American, 0.10% Pacific Islander, 0.33% from other races, and 0.80% from two or more races. Hispanic or Latino of any race were 1.21% of the population.

There were 6,713 households, out of which 29.1% had children under the age of 18 living with them, 51.4% were married couples living together, 9.4% had a female householder with no husband present, and 36.4% were non-families. 32.0% of all households were made up of individuals, and 14.1% had someone living alone who was 65 years of age or older. The average household size was 2.25 and the average family size was 2.84.

Age spread: 23.6% under the age of 18, 7.6% from 18 to 24, 27.2% from 25 to 44, 22.3% from 45 to 64, and 19.2% who were 65 years of age or older. The median age was 39 years. For every 100 females, there were 90.8 males. For every 100 females age 18 and over, there were 87.0 males.

The median income for a household in the city was $40,345, and the median income for a family was $49,977. Males had a median income of $37,248 versus $22,631 for females. The per capita income for the city was $20,552. About 4.8% of families and 6.8% of the population were below the poverty line, including 8.0% of those under age 18 and 6.4% of those age 65 or over.

== Government ==
Newton is administered by a mayor and a six-person city council. The mayor is elected to a term of two years. Newton's current mayor is Randy Ervin. His predecessor was Evelyn George. The city council consists of one member elected from each of Newton's four wards and two members elected at-large. The council members are elected to terms of four years.

=== State and federal facilities ===
The United States Postal Service operates the Newton Post Office.

The Iowa Department of Corrections Newton Correctional Facility is in unincorporated Jasper County, near Newton.

== Notable people ==
- Matt Chatham, 3x Super Bowl champion, New England Patriots
- Jay Clark, Olympic sport shooter
- John C. Cook, politician, lawyer, judge
- Nick Easley, awarded the 2019 Outback Bowl MVP while playing for the University of Iowa Hawkeyes
- Edgar S. Furniss Jr., political scientist and educator
- Lyle Goodhue, scientist and inventor, born in Jasper County and graduated from Newton High School
- Sara Haines, Correspondent for ABC News and Good Morning America, co-host of The View, and host of The Chase
- Emerson Hough, author
- F.L. "Fritz" Maytag III, businessman and entrepreneur
- Harold Blaine Miller, 1st Public Relations Director of the United States Navy, rear admiral (USN), Eisenhower appointee, pilot, public relations executive, college administrator, and author; born in Newton.
- Charles Murray, American policy writer and researcher, co-author of The Bell Curve
- Sharon Needles, drag queen, winner of fourth season of reality television series RuPaul's Drag Race
- Maurice H. Rees, Medical educator and Dean of University of Colorado School of Medicine from 1925 to 1945
- Mike Spegal, professional poker player
- Bessie Anderson Stanley, writer of the verse "Success", born in Newton
- Nate Teut, former MLB player

== Points of interest ==
- Iowa Speedway
- Jasper County Historical Museum
- Newton Arboretum and Botanical Gardens
- Maytag Dairy Farms
- Historic Maytag Park

== Sister cities ==
Newton is currently twinned with:

- Smila, Cherkasy Oblast, Ukraine
