= Jasper County Courthouse (Iowa) =

Historic courthouse in Newton, Iowa, U.S.

- U.S. National Register of Historic Places
- U.S. Historic district – Contributing property
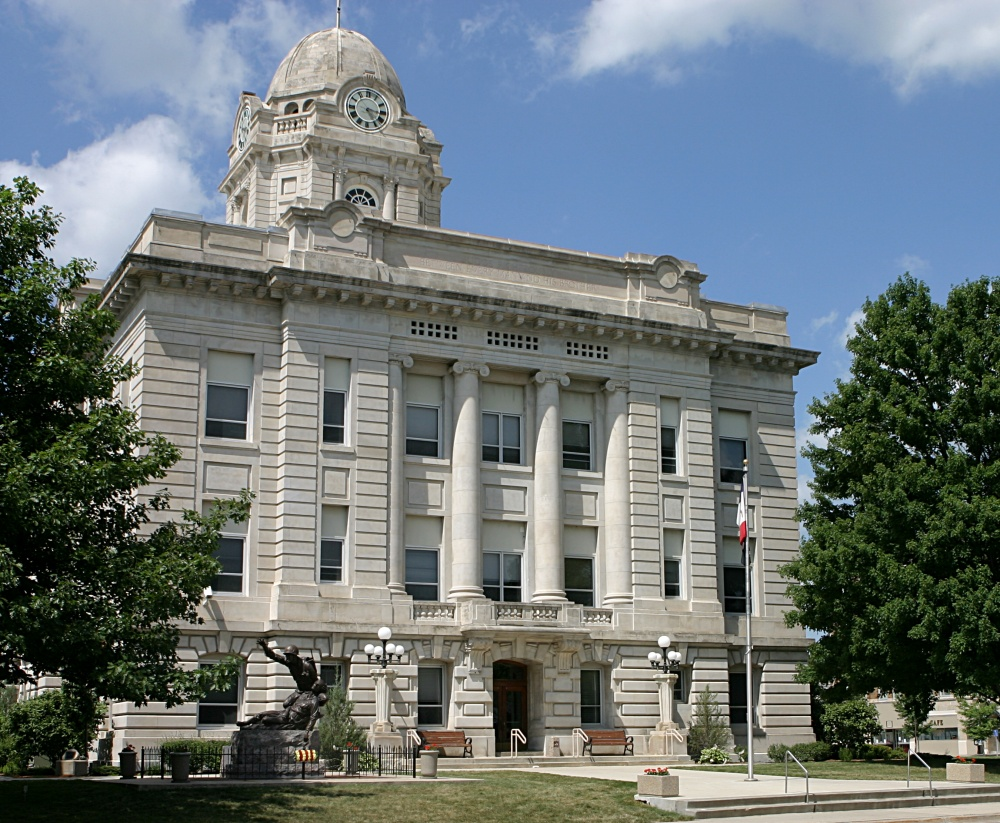
- Jasper County Courthouse

- Location within Iowa Location within the United States
- Location: 1st Ave. between W. 1st St. & W. 2nd St., Newton, Iowa, U.S.
- Coordinates: 41°42′0″N 93°3′15″W
- Area: less than one acre
- Built: 1909-1911
- Architect: Proudfoot & Bird
- Architectural style: Beaux Arts
- Part of: Newton Downtown Historic District (ID14000665)
- MPS: County Courthouses in Iowa TR
- NRHP reference No.: 81000249
- Added to NRHP: July 2, 1981

The Jasper County Courthouse is located in Newton, Iowa, United States, and was built from 1909 to 1911. It was individually listed on the National Register of Historic Places in 1981. In 2014 it was included as a contributing property in the Newton Downtown Historic District.

== History ==
Court was first held in Jasper County in 1846 in a one-room addition to the log cabin of Matthew D. Springer. The first courthouse was built of lumber in 1847; it was 30 by 18 feet (9.1 by 5.5 m) and cost a total of $87.50. That courthouse was later moved to a farm near Newton. A second courthouse was a brick structure that was faced with limestone and built in 1857 at a total cost of $26,600. Its basement was sandstone. The 62 by 50 feet (19 by 15 m) building featured porticos that extended 12 feet (3.7 m) from the building that were held up by Ionic columns. A cupola that rose 83 feet (25 m) above the ground.

== Current courthouse ==
The third and current courthouse was dedicated in 1911. The simplified version of the Beaux Arts style was designed by the prominent Des Moines architectural firm of Proudfoot & Bird. It is built of Indiana limestone except for the doors and window casings which are wooden. American general and Iowa politician James B. Weaver wrote of the current courthouse in the 1912 county history, "long after the pages of this county history are worn and turned yellow with age, in all human probability this building will stand in all its massive beauty". The Jasper County Medical Society held their annual meetings at the courthouse.

The courthouse measures 121 by 80 feet (37 by 24 m) with a clock tower that rises 140 feet (43 m). The clock was created with the help of private donations, and its faces are set into the parapets around the tower. The interior has ceramic tile and marble, and freestanding column screens divide the hallways from the rotunda. The outside of the building is decorated during the Christmas season. There was a renovation of the courthouse in 1986 that fixed the interior and involved the dome and paintings. Then-governor of Iowa Terry Branstad visited the courthouse for its 100th anniversary on July 4, 2011. The significance of the courthouse is derived from its association with county government, and the political power and prestige of Newton as the county seat.
