= State Center, Iowa =

- City
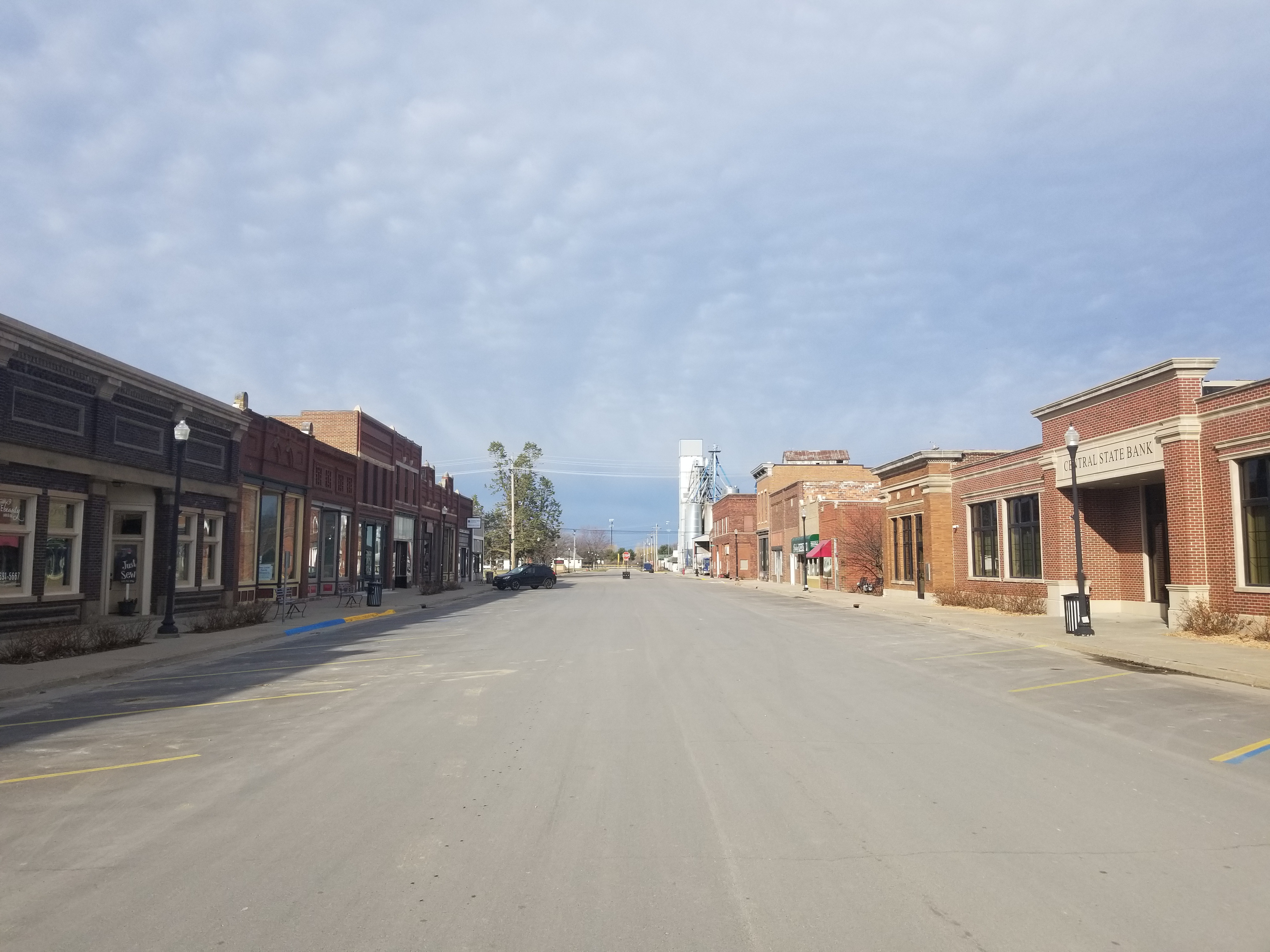
- Central State Center in April 2022
- Nickname: Rose Capital of Iowa
- Location of State Center, Iowa
- Coordinates: 42°00′53″N 93°09′55″W
- Country: United States
- State: Iowa
- County: Marshall

Area
  - Total: 1.00 sq mi (2.58 km^{2})
  - Land: 1.00 sq mi (2.58 km^{2})
  - Water: 0 sq mi (0.00 km^{2})
- Elevation: 1,070 ft (330 m)

Population (2020)
  - Total: 1,391
  - Density: 1,394.4/sq mi (538.37/km^{2})
- Time zone: UTC-6 (Central (CST))
  - Summer (DST): UTC-5 (CDT)
- ZIP code: 50247
- Area code: 641
- FIPS code: 19-75135
- GNIS feature ID: 2395958
- Website: http://www.statecenteriowa.org/

State Center is a city in Marshall County, Iowa, United States. The population was 1,391 at the time of the 2020 census. State Center is known as the Rose Capital of Iowa.

== History ==
State Center got its start in the year 1864, following construction of the railroad through the territory. It was named for its location near the geographical center of the state.

== Geography ==
According to the United States Census Bureau, the city has a total area of 0.98 square miles (2.54 km^{2}), all land.

== Demographics ==
Historical populations
Year	Pop.	±%
1870	559	—
1880	880	+57.4%
1890	854	−3.0%
1900	1,008	+18.0%
1910	898	−10.9%
1920	975	+8.6%
1930	1,012	+3.8%
1940	1,033	+2.1%
1950	1,040	+0.7%
1960	1,142	+9.8%
1970	1,232	+7.9%
1980	1,292	+4.9%
1990	1,248	−3.4%
2000	1,349	+8.1%
2010	1,468	+8.8%
2020	1,391	−5.2%
Source:"U.S. Census website". United States Census Bureau. and Iowa Data Center; Source: U.S. Decennial Census

=== 2020 census ===
As of the 2020 census, State Center had a population of 1,391, with 583 households and 374 families. The population density was 1,394.4 inhabitants per square mile (538.4/km^{2}). There were 630 housing units at an average density of 631.5 per square mile (243.8/km^{2}).

The median age was 40.3 years. 25.1% of residents were under the age of 18, 27.7% were under the age of 20, and 19.2% were 65 years of age or older. 4.1% of residents were between the ages of 20 and 24, 22.9% were from 25 to 44, and 26.1% were from 45 to 64. The gender makeup of the city was 49.7% male and 50.3% female. For every 100 females there were 98.7 males, and for every 100 females age 18 and over there were 93.7 males age 18 and over.

Of the 583 households, 30.5% had children under the age of 18 living with them. Of all households, 51.8% were married-couple households, 5.0% were cohabiting couple households, 18.5% had a male householder with no spouse or partner present, and 24.7% had a female householder with no spouse or partner present. About 35.8% of households were non-families, 32.1% were made up of individuals, and 14.6% had someone living alone who was 65 years of age or older.

Of housing units, 7.5% were vacant. The homeowner vacancy rate was 2.7% and the rental vacancy rate was 7.5%. 0.0% of residents lived in urban areas, while 100.0% lived in rural areas.

Racial composition as of the 2020 census
Race	Number	Percent
White	1,307	94.0%
Black or African American	3	0.2%
American Indian and Alaska Native	1	0.1%
Asian	3	0.2%
Native Hawaiian and Other Pacific Islander	0	0.0%
Some other race	19	1.4%
Two or more races	58	4.2%
Hispanic or Latino (of any race)	81	5.8%

=== 2010 census ===
As of the census of 2010, there were 1,468 people, 568 households, and 399 families living in the city. The population density was 1,498.0 inhabitants per square mile (578.4/km^{2}). There were 630 housing units at an average density of 642.9 per square mile (248.2/km^{2}). The racial makeup of the city was 96.7% White, 0.5% African American, 0.1% Native American, 0.3% Asian, 1.2% from other races, and 1.2% from two or more races. Hispanic or Latino of any race were 3.5% of the population.

There were 568 households, of which 36.6% had children under the age of 18 living with them, 54.9% were married couples living together, 11.3% had a female householder with no husband present, 4.0% had a male householder with no wife present, and 29.8% were non-families. 24.6% of all households were made up of individuals, and 12.7% had someone living alone who was 65 years of age or older. The average household size was 2.52 and the average family size was 3.02.

The median age in the city was 39.2 years. 28.1% of residents were under the age of 18; 5.9% were between the ages of 18 and 24; 23.6% were from 25 to 44; 25.5% were from 45 to 64; and 16.9% were 65 years of age or older. The gender makeup of the city was 49.7% male and 50.3% female.

=== 2000 census ===
As of the census of 2000, there were 1,349 people, 559 households, and 354 families living in the city. The population density was 1,384.4 inhabitants per square mile (534.5/km^{2}). There were 597 housing units at an average density of 612.7 per square mile (236.6/km^{2}). The racial makeup of the city was 97.78% White, 0.15% Native American, 0.07% Asian, 1.11% from other races, and 0.89% from two or more races. Hispanic or Latino of any race were 1.85% of the population.

There were 559 households, out of which 29.9% had children under the age of 18 living with them, 53.8% were married couples living together, 5.7% had a female householder with no husband present, and 36.5% were non-families. 33.3% of all households were made up of individuals, and 18.4% had someone living alone who was 65 years of age or older. The average household size was 2.35 and the average family size was 3.00.

25.4% are under the age of 18, 6.7% from 18 to 24, 27.1% from 25 to 44, 20.6% from 45 to 64, and 20.2% who were 65 years of age or older. The median age was 39 years. For every 100 females, there were 90.5 males. For every 100 females age 18 and over, there were 86.8 males.

The median income for a household in the city was $35,766, and the median income for a family was $45,156. Males had a median income of $33,661 versus $25,156 for females. The per capita income for the city was $17,744. About 5.7% of families and 8.7% of the population were below the poverty line, including 15.4% of those under age 18 and 5.7% of those age 65 or over.

== Education ==
West Marshall Community School District operates public schools. The school colors are black and gold, and the mascot is a Trojan. The schools include West Marshall Elementary, West Marshall Middle School, and West Marshall High School.

== See also ==
- Dobbin Round Barn, listed on the National Register of Historic Places
- Watson's Grocery, also listed on the National Register of Historic Places
