= Newton Downtown Historic District (Newton, Iowa) =

Historic district in Iowa, United States

- U.S. National Register of Historic Places
- U.S. Historic district
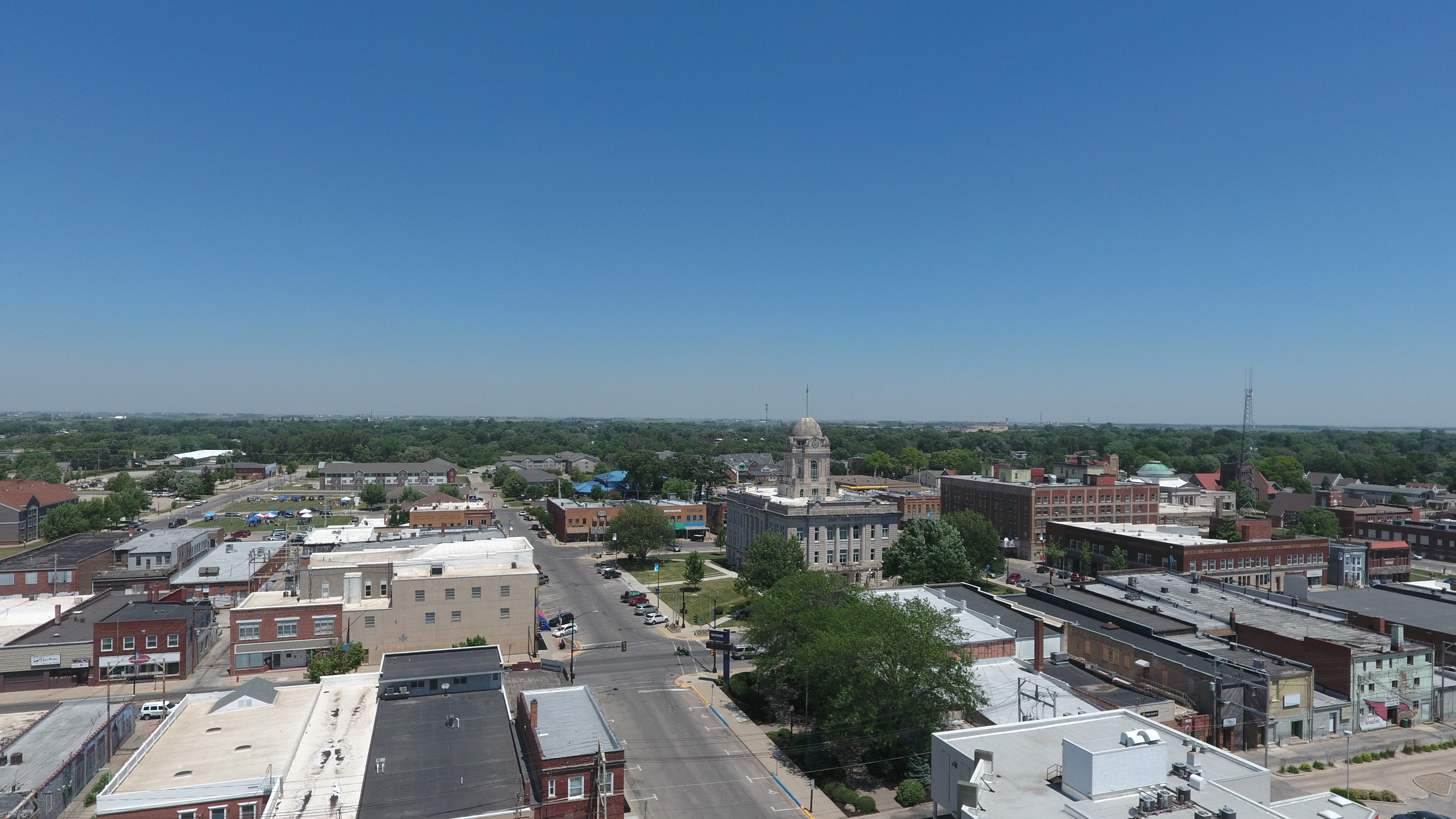

- Location within Iowa Location within the United States
- Location: Centered around Courthouse Sq. Newton, Iowa
- Coordinates: 42°02′57″N 92°54′48″W
- Area: 26.4 acres (10.7 ha)
- NRHP reference No.: 14000665
- Added to NRHP: September 22, 2014

The Newton Downtown Historic District is a nationally recognized historic district located in Newton, Iowa, United States. It was listed on the National Register of Historic Places in 2014. At the time of its nomination it contained 85 resources, which included 60 contributing buildings, one contributing site, and 24 non-contributing buildings. Jasper County was established by the Iowa Territorial Legislature in 1846, and Newton was incorporated the following year as the county seat. The town grew slowly at first around the Jasper County Courthouse. Businesses largely served the needs of the local farmers as well as the town's residents. The Mississippi and Missouri Railroad, later the Chicago, Rock Island and Pacific Railroad, came to Newton in 1867. This changed the town's economy from agricultural-based to manufacturing, and the central business district expanded outward as the community grew. Several washing machine companies established themselves in Newton, most notably Maytag. The emergence of Maytag as a major corporation in the mid-20th century led to the transformation of the downtown area. Between 1951 and 1952, 18 businesses installed new storefronts, transforming them from their original Victorian appearance to a more modern appearance. The modernization continued into the 1960s.

Various architects, mostly from Iowa, designed most of the important buildings in the district. The exception was Henry Raeder, a Chicago architect who designed the Hotel Maytag (1926). Most of the buildings in the district, however, were designed by local builder-contractors. All of the buildings are of masonry construction. A majority of the structures housed retail concerns on the main floor with apartments or offices on the upper floors. Other buildings housed banks, restaurants, service stations, the local newspaper, a hotel, and fraternal organizations. Three churches, the Salvation Army, First United Methodist, and First Presbyterian, are located in the district. Government buildings located here include the former city hall, former post office, and county public services. The present county courthouse (1911) is individually listed on the National Register. The courthouse square is the contributing site.
