= Calkin (disambiguation) =

Calkin or calkins may refer to:

- a Caulkin, part of a horseshoe

== Geography ==
- Calkin Glacier, a glacier west of Sentinel Peak, flowing north from the Kukri Hills in Victoria Land, Antarctica

== Mathematics ==
- In functional analysis, the Calkin algebra, named after John Wilson Calkin
- The Calkin–Wilf tree in number theory

== People ==
- Calkin (surname)
- Calkins (surname)

== Other uses ==
- Calkins Media, a media company based in Levittown, Pennsylvania
- C.C. Calkins, a small steamboat built in 1890 which served on Lake Washington
