= Calkins =

Calkins is a surname. Notable people with the surname include:

- Blaine Calkins (born 1968), Canadian politician
- Blean Calkins (1921–2003), sports radio broadcaster
- Buzz Calkins (born 1971), American racing car driver
- Dick Calkins (1894–1962), comic strip artist
- Earnest Elmo Calkins (1868–1964), American advertising executive
- Frank C. Calkins (1878–1974), American geologist
- Gary Nathan Calkins (1869–1943), American zoologist
- George H. Calkins (1830–1896), American physician and politician
- Helen Calkins (1893–1970), American mathematician
- Homer D. Calkins (1911–1996), American environmentalist
- Hugh Calkins (1924–2014), American academic administrator
- Irving Calkins (1875–1958), American sport shooter
- Mary Whiton Calkins (1863–1930), American philosopher and psychologist
- Michelle Calkins, Canadian synchronized swimmer and coach
- William H. Calkins (1842–1894), American politician from Indiana

== See also ==
- Calkin (surname)
- Calkins, Montana
