= Lennox Merit Series air conditioner =

Air conditioner product by Lennox International

Lennox Merit Series
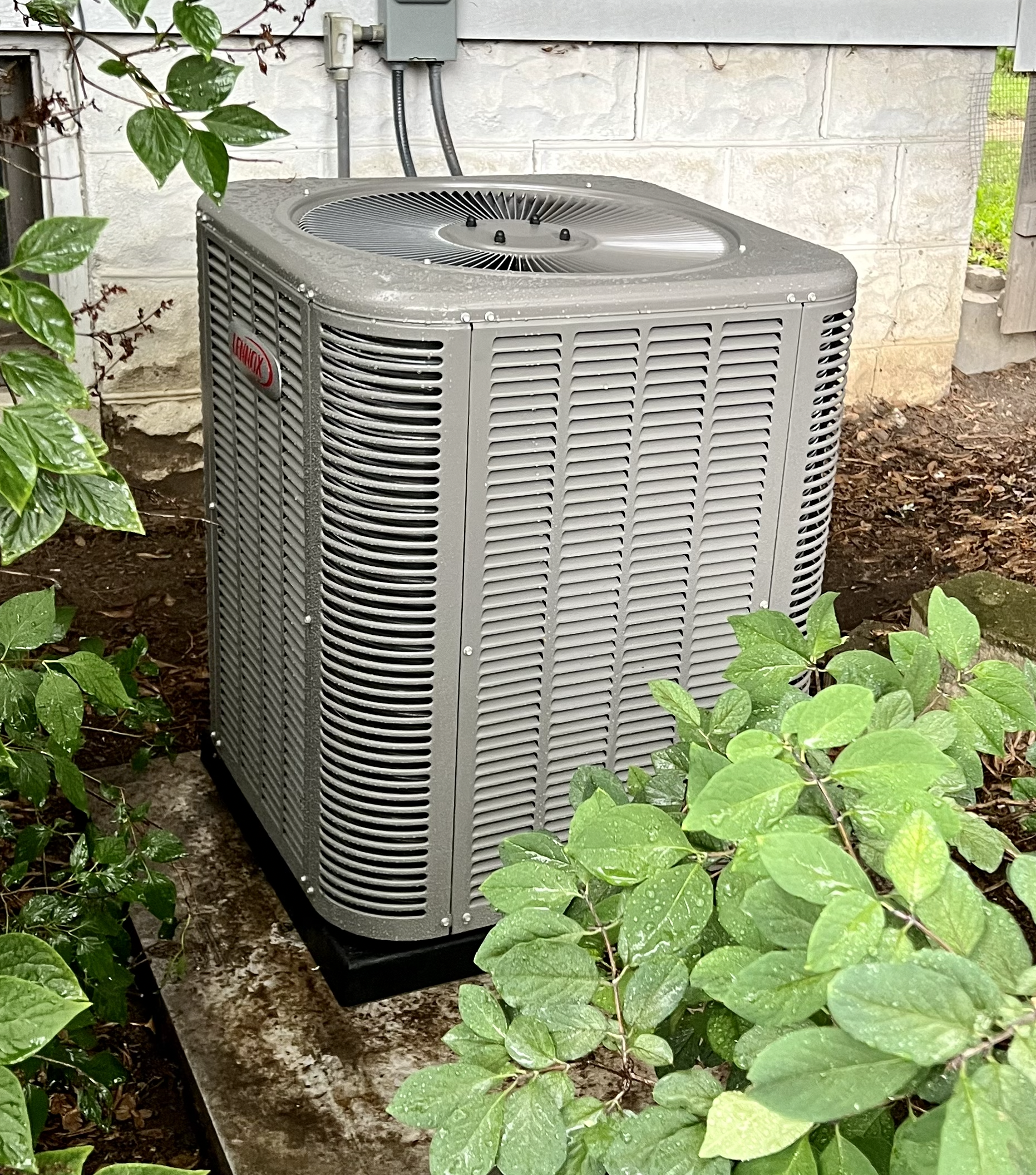
- Lennox Merit series 13ACXN030-230 2.5 ton
- Type: Air Conditioner
- Manufacturer: Lennox International
- Current supplier: Lennox
- Website: Lennox

Lennox Merit series is a line of residential air conditioners made by Lennox International. The Merit series is considered the budget series in the three tiers of Lennox air conditioner models. The series is manufactured in Saltillo, Mexico.

== History ==
Lennox has three different series of air conditioners, Elite, Dave Lennox Signature Collection and Merit series. The Merit series is the lowest cost Lennox air conditioner, and there are 4 models of Single-stage with a 13, 14, 15 or 16 Seasonal energy efficiency ratio (SEER) rating. The units are also available with ratings from 1.4 tons to 5 tons. The company offers a warranty of up to ten years

The Merit series is manufactured in Saltillo, Mexico, under the name LII United Products. The Merit series is the primary Lennox-brand product serving Sun Belt market. The Saltillo location allowed Lennox to serve the Sun Belt with lower cost of shipping the units. The 300,000 sqft plant began in 2007 with an expected full production date of 2010. The Merit air conditioner line was the only Merit series product which was produced in Mexico.

== Reception ==
Lennox air conditioners are known for energy efficiency, however they are louder than other brands of air conditioners: the industry average of 40 to 60 decibels, and Lennox machines are 70 decibels. Even though the Merit series is considered the budget line of Lennox air conditioners, it is still more expensive than most comparable models on the market. All Lennox models including the Merit series are known for being higher priced but efficient and reliable. In 2022 Consumer Reports survey of members gave Lennox air conditioning units a top rating of Excellent.
