= Death sticks =

Death sticks or Deathstick may refer to:

- A slang term for cigarettes
- A brand of framing hammer
- The Elder Wand, a fictional, powerful magical artifact in the Harry Potter universe
