= DW Norris =

D.W. (Fritz) Norris (February 2, 1876 – October 5, 1949), a.k.a. David Windsor “Fritz” Norris Jr. was an American newspaper publisher and businessman.

== Early life ==
He was born in Chicago, Ill. He graduated from Grinnell College in 1892.

== Career ==
He began to sell advertising in 1897 in Marshalltown, Iowa for the Marshalltown Times Republican and in 1899, purchased the paper and became editor and publisher.

In 1904 he purchased a furnace business from Dave Lennox for $54,789 that was based on a novel patented furnace design using riveted steel, incorporated the operation as "Lennox Furnace Company" and proceeded to sell 600 furnaces in the first year. Under his management, the company grew to hold an important place in the heating industry by the 1940s (and during World War II, parts for bombs and aircraft) with multiple manufacturing locations. Norris continued to control and managed the firm until his death in 1949. His descendants continued to play a role in the company. Today, the furnace company is a publicly traded company called Lennox International, Inc.
