= Claw hammer =

Common carpentry tool

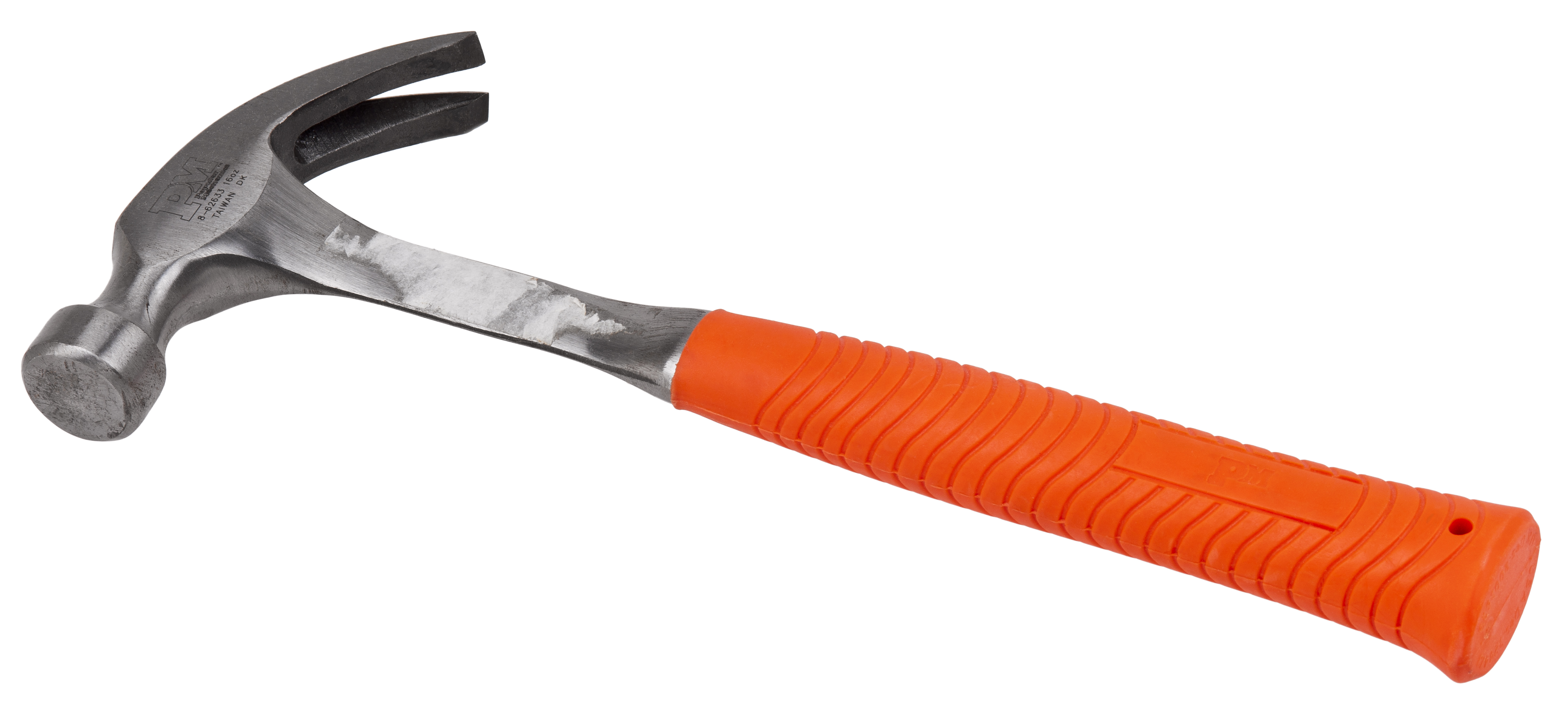
Standard claw hammer

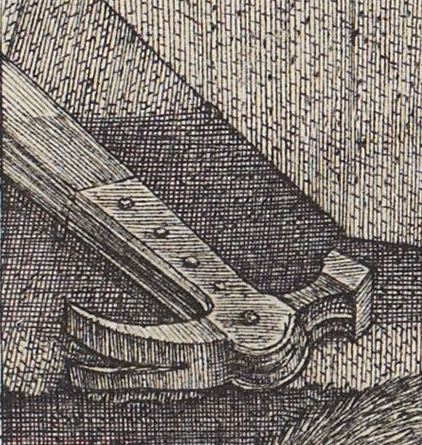
16th century claw hammer from Dürer's "Melencolia I" (1514)

A claw hammer is a hammer primarily used in carpentry for driving nails into or pulling them from wood. Historically, a claw hammer has been associated with woodworking, but is also used in general applications. It is not suitable for heavy hammering on metal surfaces (such as in machining work), as the steel of its head is somewhat brittle; the ball-peen hammer is more suitable for such metalwork.

An early claw hammer is seen in Albrecht Dürer's etching "Melencolia I," dated 1514, halfway up the left side. There are several nails in the lower right corner.

== Design ==
A claw hammer is composed of a metal head and a handle, which historically was made of wood but also may be of steel, fiberglass, or other composite. One side of the head has a poll with either a smooth or textured surface and used for driving, while the other is formed into a pair of downward curving V-shaped claws and used for prying — most commonly extracting nails from wood. The greater the curve of the claw(s), and longer the handle, the greater the leverage that may be applied.

== Types ==
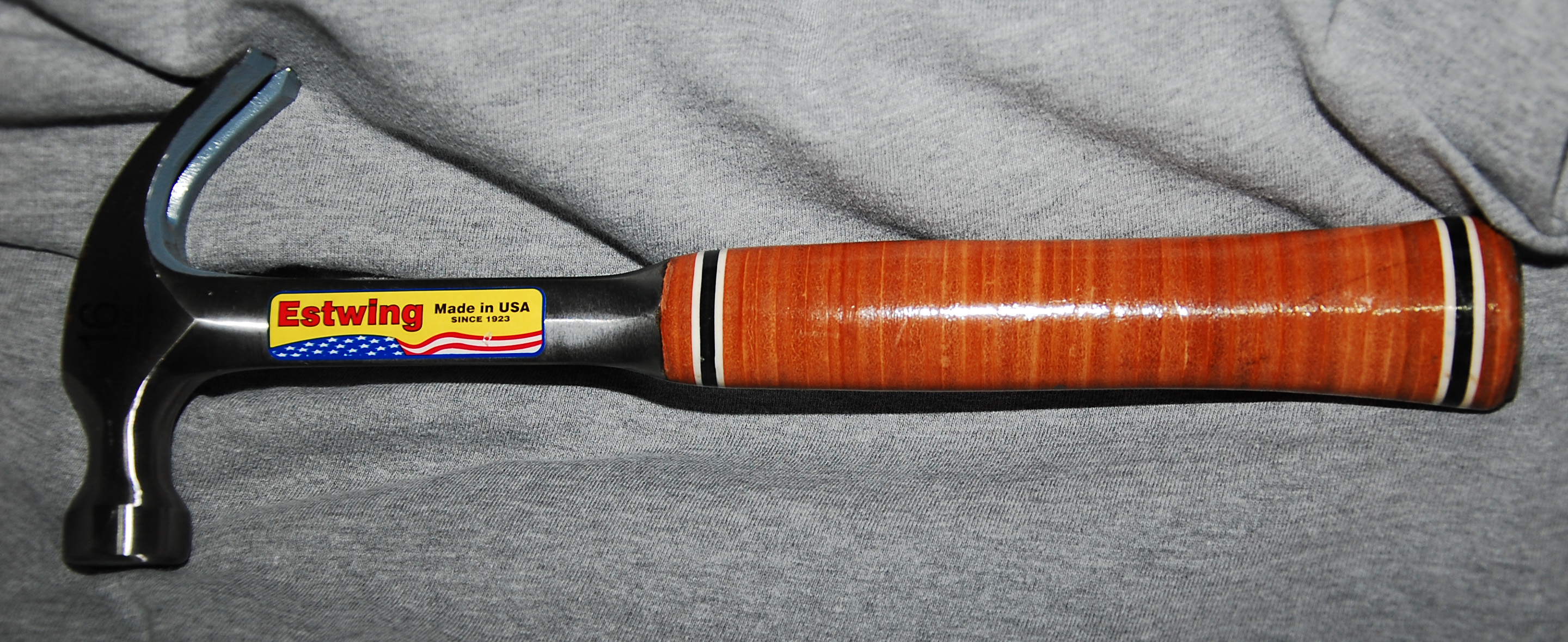
Traditional-style claw hammer with leather-wrapped handle

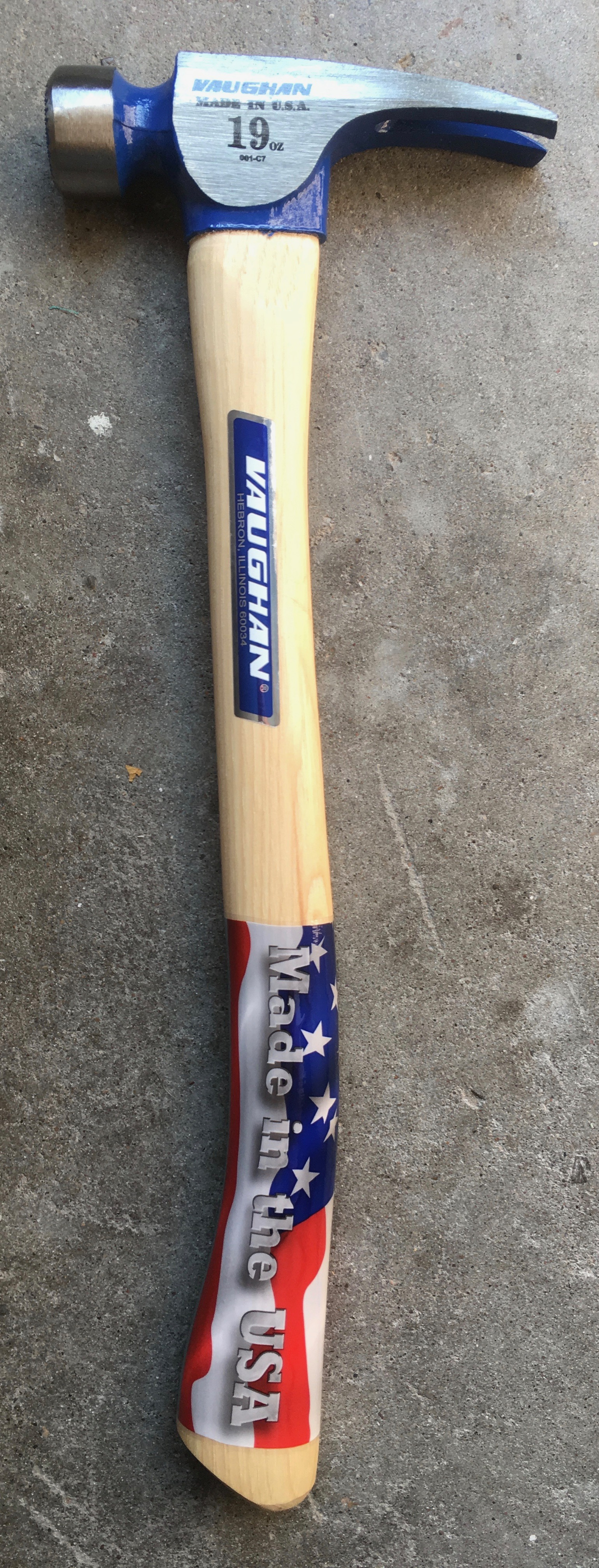
A 19-ounce hatchet-handled Vaughan "California Framer" framing hammer

- Two-piece. The most popular type. This hammer is constructed from a forged steel head with a hole for fixing a handle. One end is made to fit the hole in the hammer head, then a steel wedge is driven into the wood which forces it to expand and secure the hammer head to the handle. Other handle materials include glass fiber and even carbon fiber.
- Single-piece. Forged heat-treated steel where the head and handle are integral. These hammers often have polymer grips to add to their ergonomics and decrease vibrations when the hammer is used.
- Framing hammer. This is an oversized claw hammer used in framing carpentry. The larger and heavier head can decrease the number of blows required to fully drive a nail, minimized further by increased leverage (torque) and head speed generated by longer handles. Framing hammers also characteristically have a checkered "milled" face, which reduces skip-off of the head if the blow is not precisely struck on the nail. The slight indentations left on the wood by the checkered face are considered unimportant in rough carpentry. Framing hammers also have a much straighter claw than regular claw hammers, as the claw is designed more for prying nailed boards apart, rather than removing nails (though its claw can also be used in that capacity).
  The size of this type of hammer is commonly designated by the weight of its head, which may range from 7–32 oz (200–910 g).

== Bibliography ==
- Hazra Choudhary, A text book on workshop technology
