= Leroy R. Willard House =

Historic house in Iowa, United States

- U.S. National Register of Historic Places
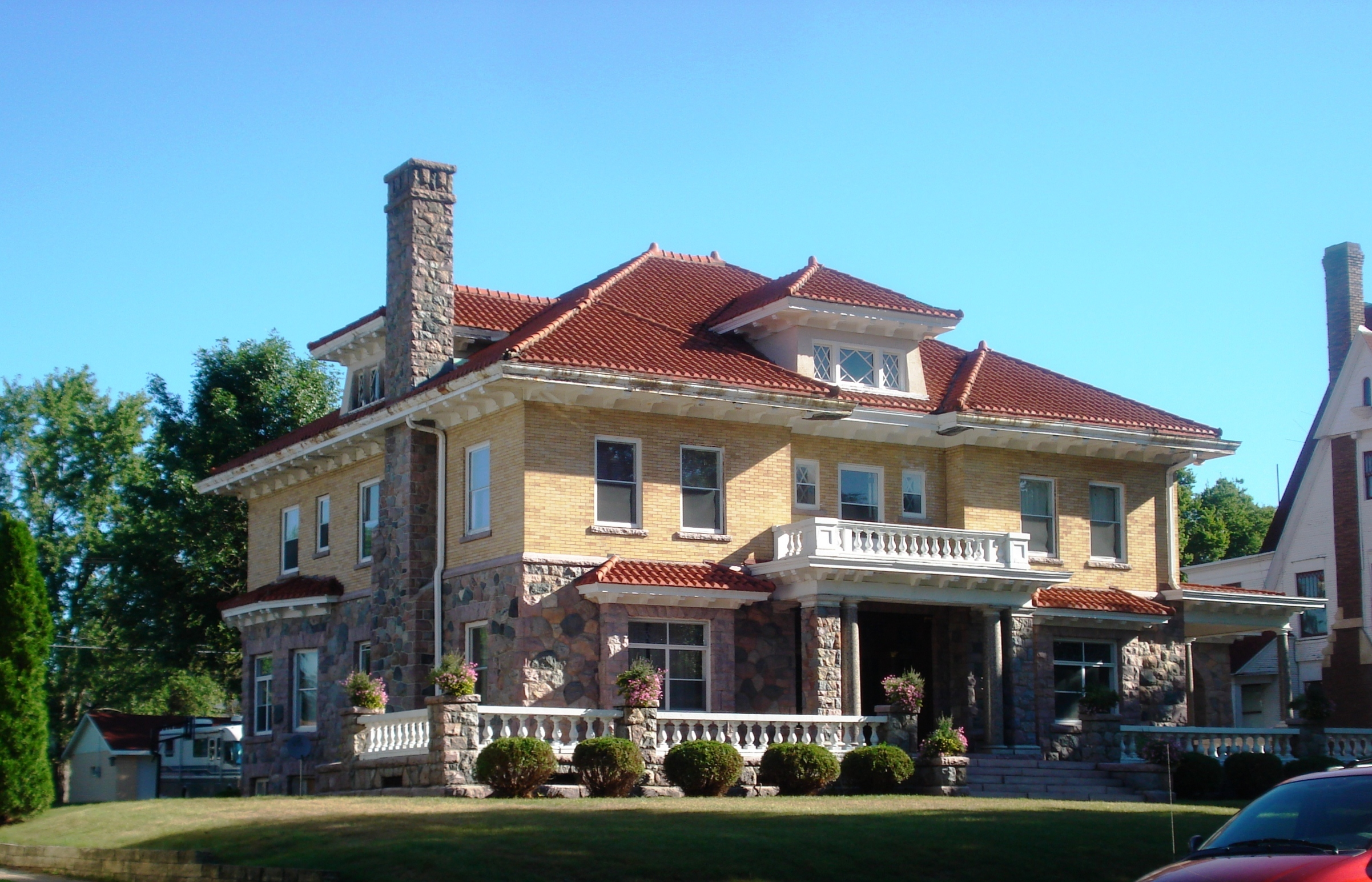

- Location within Iowa Location within the United States
- Location: 609 W. Main St. Marshalltown, Iowa
- Coordinates: 42°02′57″N 92°55′22″W
- Built: 1910
- Architect: Charles Eckman
- Architectural style: Edwardian/Georgian
- NRHP reference No.: 76000794
- Added to NRHP: October 22, 1976

The Leroy R. Willard House, also known as Willard Mansion, is located in Marshalltown, Iowa. The house was built in 1910 for Leroy R Willard and has been listed on the National Register of Historic Places since 1976.

== History ==
LeRoy Randall Willard (1 July 1864 - 2 October 1917) was owner of the Marshall Oil Company. The home was designed by Charles Eckman using Edwardian Georgian architectural styles.
