= Dave Lennox =

American businessman

David Lennox (April 15, 1855 – February 15, 1947) was an American inventor and businessman. A furnace manufacturing business he founded in 1895 in Marshalltown, Iowa evolved into what is today known as Lennox International, a global corporation specializing in air conditioning, heating, and commercial refrigeration. Lennox helped to develop what has been described as the first riveted-steel furnace in 1895. His contributions to furnace design have been described as significant steps forward in durability and efficiency from the cast iron furnaces commonly in use near the end of the 19th century.

== Early life ==
Born in Detroit, Michigan on April 15, 1855, Lennox was the son of a railroad mechanic. His family moved to Aurora, Illinois shortly before the American Civil War, where Lennox's father enlisted in the Union Army. His father was killed in 1863 at the battle of Champion Hill, east of Vicksburg, Mississippi. The surviving Lennox family moved to Chicago in 1865, where Lennox's mother ran a grocery store while he worked in various machine shops.

David Lennox moved to Marshalltown, Iowa in July, 1881, where he initially was hired by the Iowa Steel Wire Company to make barbs for their barbed wire fencing. He fabricated a custom machine to cut the steel barbs and soon afterwards started his own blacksmith and machine shop. Lennox designed a staple-cutting machine for Ed Sears, a local businessman, well drills that were used to penetrate deeper into the ground, also developed new designs for trowels in which the Marshalltown Company was founded, heavy-duty shears, and other tools.

== Furnace business ==
In 1895, Ernest Bryant and Ezra Smith, two businessmen from Oskaloosa, Iowa, shared with Lennox their plans for a furnace using riveted steel for the heating surface. The furnaces used to heat homes at that time were made entirely of cast iron, which had a tendency to warp and crack after extended use and could cause smoke and coal gases to seep into houses. Bryant, Smith, and Lennox entered into an agreement in which Lennox made the iron castings used for the grates, fronts, and other parts of their steel furnaces. When Bryant and Smith were unable to pay Lennox for the iron castings after losing their financial backing, Lennox took over their patents and reworked their original design. Marketing the furnaces under his own Torrid Zone brand name, Lennox's furnace business grew and became a success.

Lennox sold his furnace business in 1904 to a group of local Marshalltown businessmen, led by David Windsor Norris, a local business and civic leader and owner of the local newspaper, the Marshalltown Times Republican. According to company records, the sales price was $57,789.14. Norris began operating the company under the name Lennox Furnace Company. The company grew across the United States throughout the first half of the 20th century, expanded into the air conditioning industry in the early 1950s, and was renamed Lennox Industries. Expanding further into commercial refrigeration and international markets, Lennox Industries became Lennox International Inc. in 1984. After 95 years of private ownership by the Norris family, the company now known as Lennox International made its initial public offering in 1999 and is currently traded on the New York Stock Exchange under the symbol "LII."

== Later enterprises ==
Following the sale of his furnace business, Dave Lennox continued to manage the Lennox Machine Company in Marshalltown, employing more than 100 people locally in the manufacture of portable gasoline engines, boilermakers' tools, wagon scales and pressured pipe taps. Lennox sold the Lennox Machine Shop in 1912 to the Ryerson Brothers of Chicago for $110,000, but continued to work in a small machine shop behind his Marshalltown home during his subsequent retirement.

Lennox died at his home in Marshalltown on February 15, 1947, at the age of 91. Since 1972, two actors have portrayed Dave Lennox in advertising campaigns for Lennox-branded air conditioners, furnaces, and indoor air quality products.

From 1972 until his death in 1986, Lennox was portrayed by Hollywood actor Bill Tracy, whose photo still appears on many Lennox dealer trucks and advertising. Tracy was originally hired because he had hands that looked worn like a real working man.

Lennox was then portrayed by Bob Tibbets St. Louis-based actor and radio personality, who portrayed Lennox on TV and radio, as well as home shows and dealer events, until his retirement in December 2016, after 30 years.
