= Marshalltown, Iowa =

- City
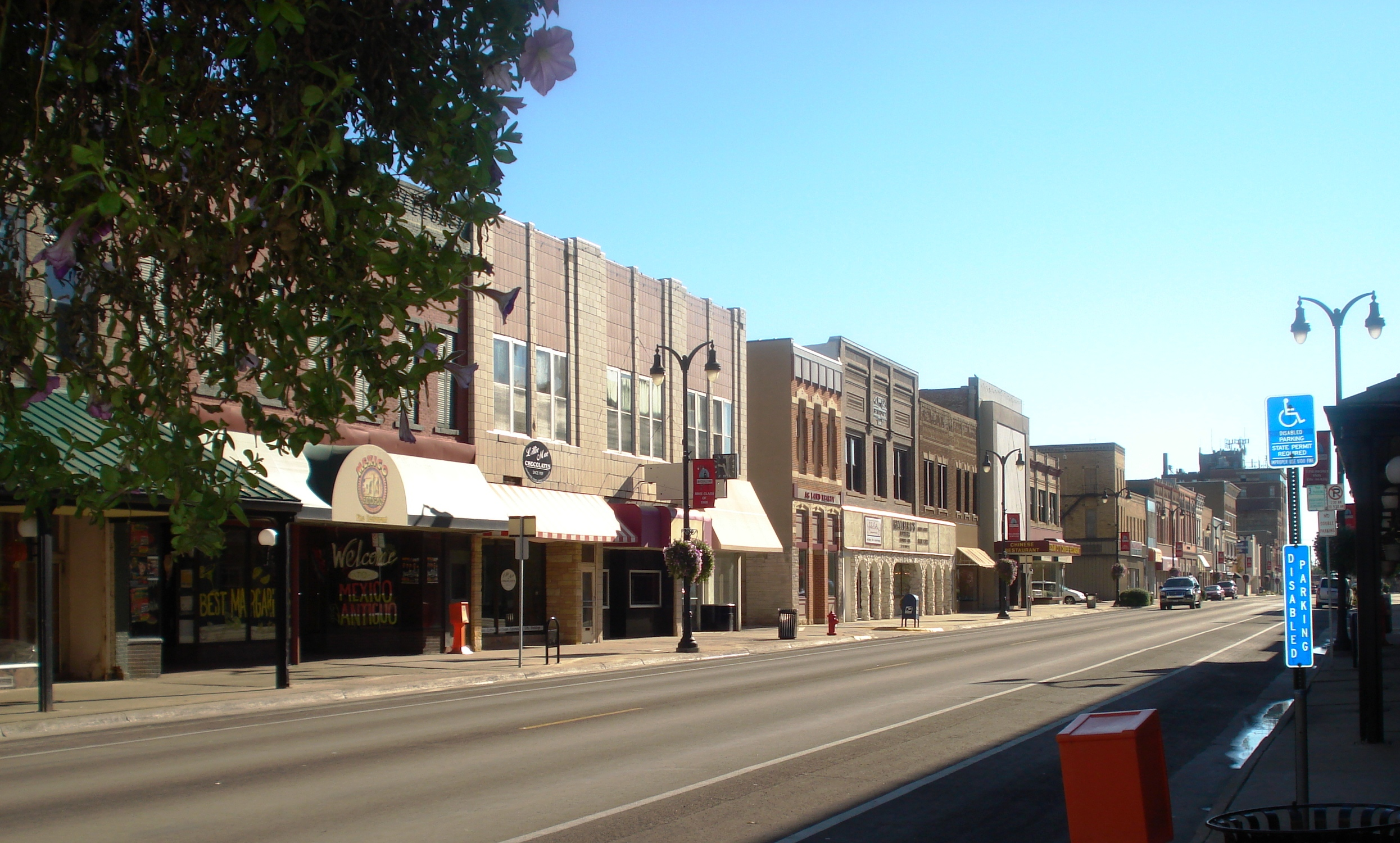
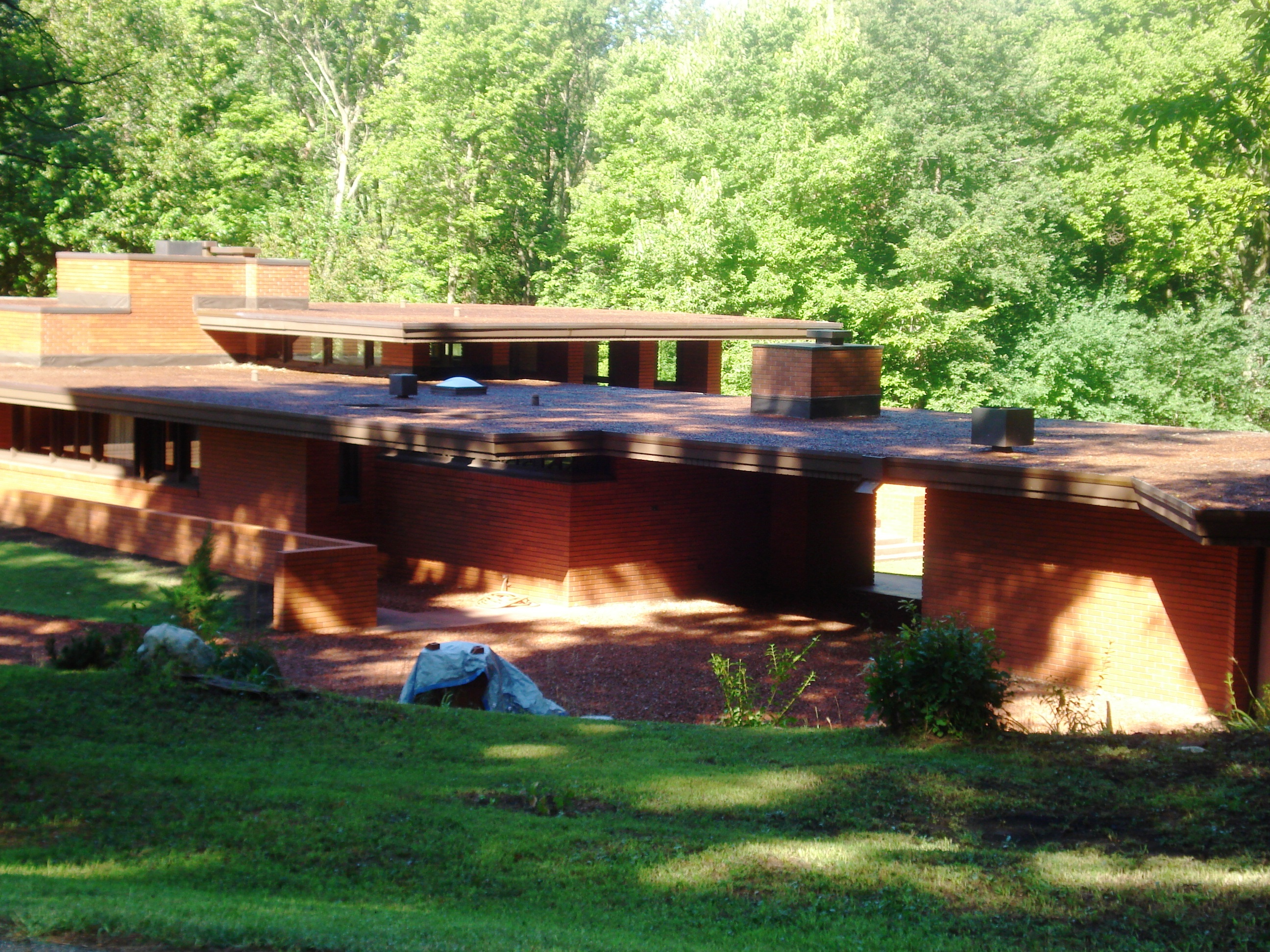
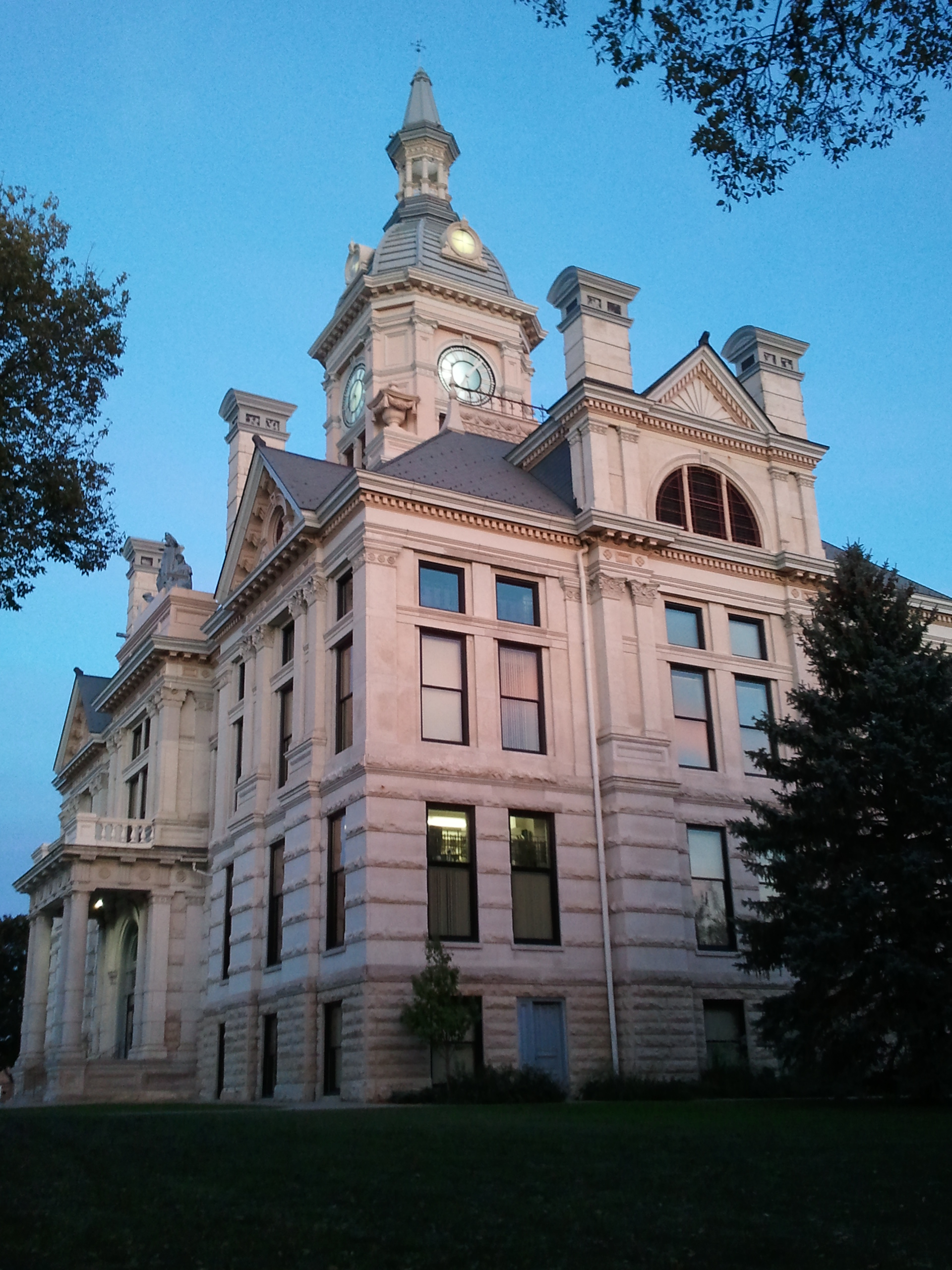
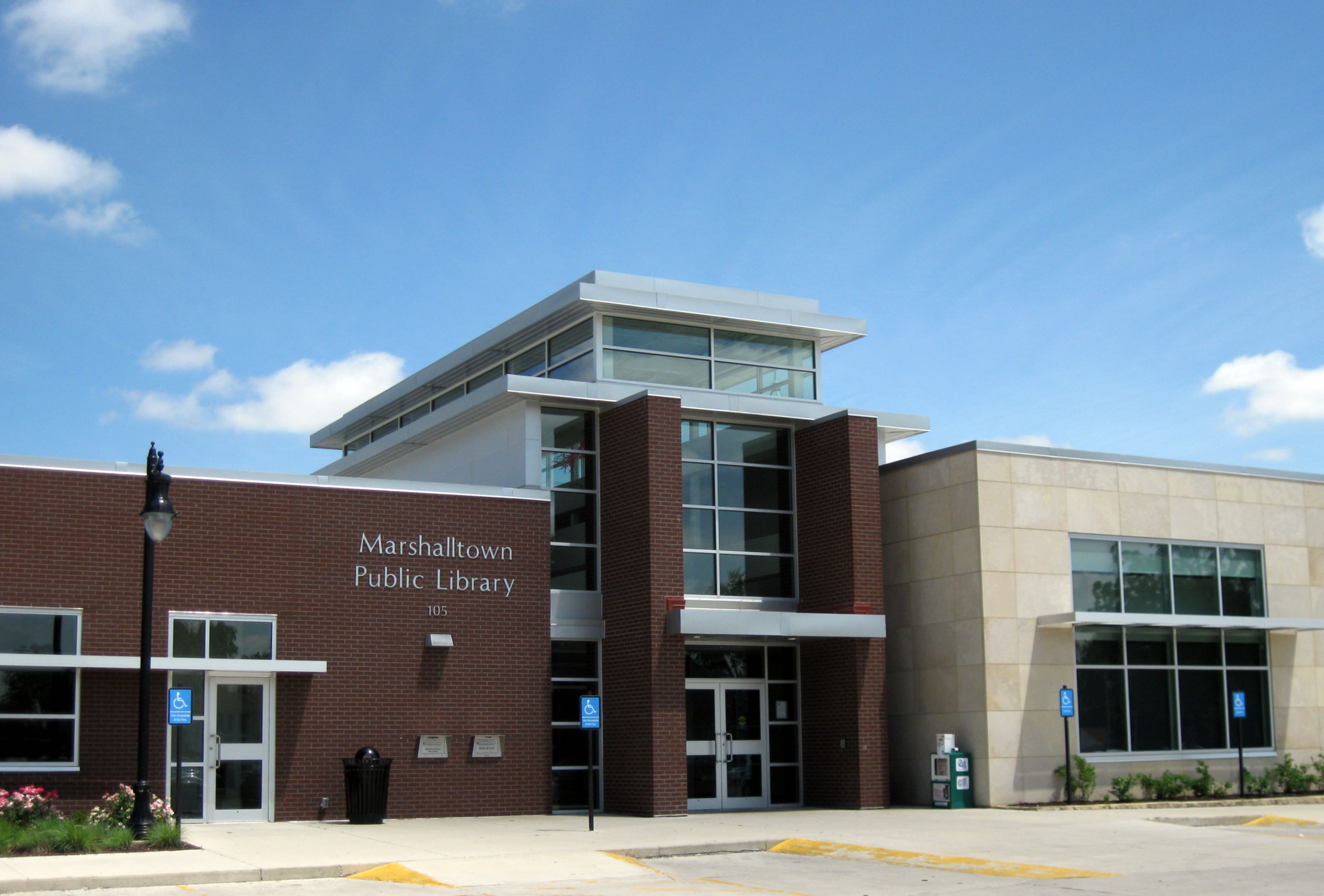
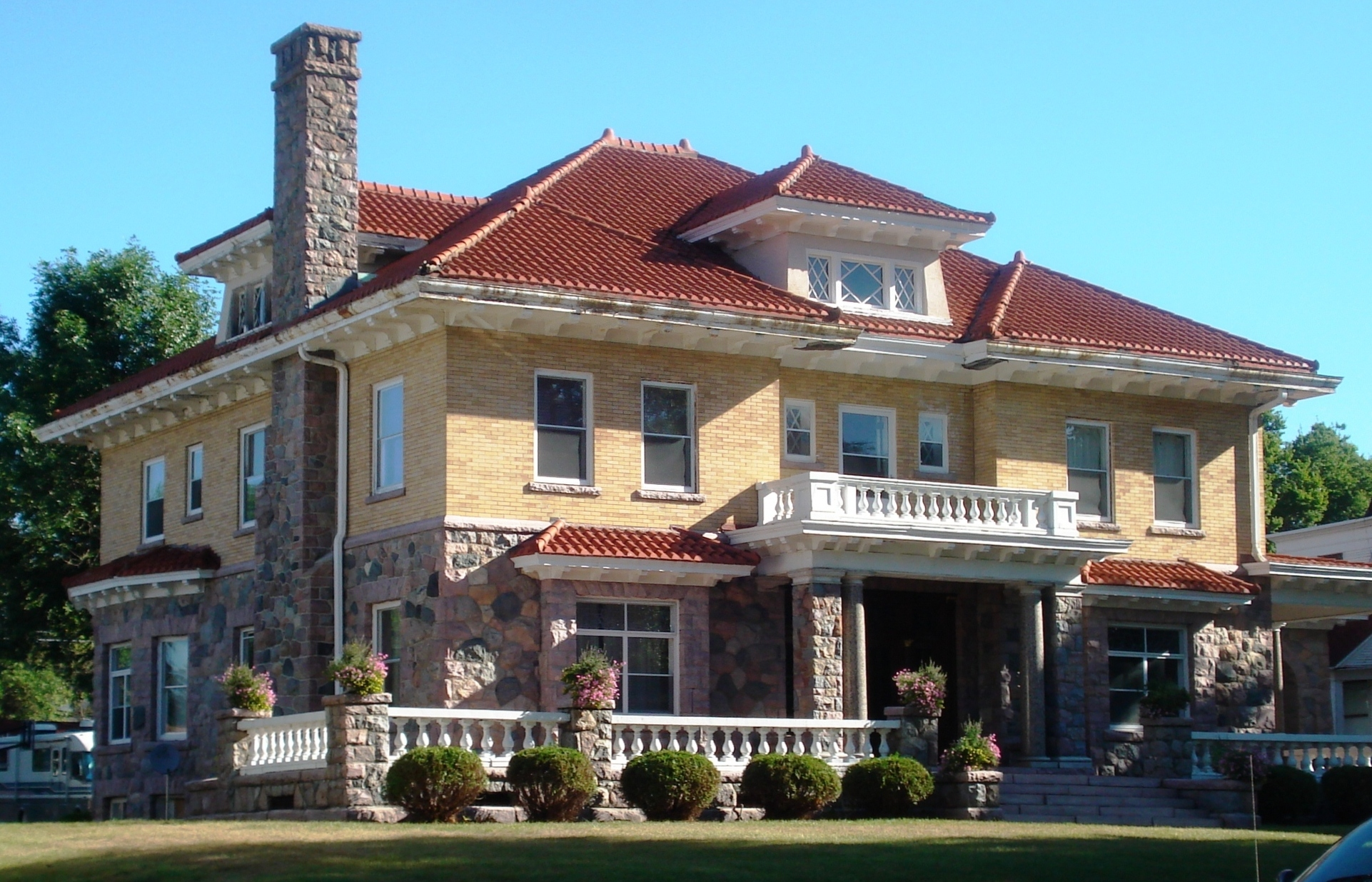
- Downtown Marshalltown Robert H. Sunday House Marshall County Courthouse Marshalltown Library Leroy Willard Mansion
- Interactive map of Marshalltown, Iowa
- Coordinates: 42.034300°N 92.906266°W
- Country: United States
- State: Iowa
- County: Marshall
- Settled: April 1851 as of Anson
- Founded: 1853 as of Marshall; July 11, 1855; 1862 as of Marshalltown
- Incorporated: March 5, 1923
- Founder: Henry Anson

Government
  - Mayor: Joel Greer
  - Mayor Pro-Tem: Mike Ladehoff
  - City Council: Mark Mitchell; Greg Nichols; Melisa Fonseca
  - At Large: Barry Kell; Jeff Schneider; Gary Thompson

Area
  - City: 19.193 sq mi (49.710 km^{2})
  - Land: 19.167 sq mi (49.643 km^{2})
  - Water: 0.026 sq mi (0.068 km^{2}) 0.14%
- Elevation: 899 ft (274 m)

Population (2020)
  - City: 27,591
  - Estimate (2024): 27,886
  - Density: 1,439.5/sq mi (555.79/km^{2})
  - Urban: 27,381
  - Metro: 40,392
- Time zone: UTC–6 (Central (CST))
  - Summer (DST): UTC–5 (CDT)
- ZIP Code: 50158
- Area code: 641
- FIPS code: 19-49755
- GNIS feature ID: 2395024
- Website: marshalltown-ia.gov

Marshalltown is a city in and the county seat of Marshall County, Iowa, United States. The population was 27,591 at the 2020 census, and was estimated at 27,886 in 2024, making it the 17th-most populous city in Iowa. Marshalltown is home to the Iowa Veterans Home and Marshalltown Community College.

== History ==
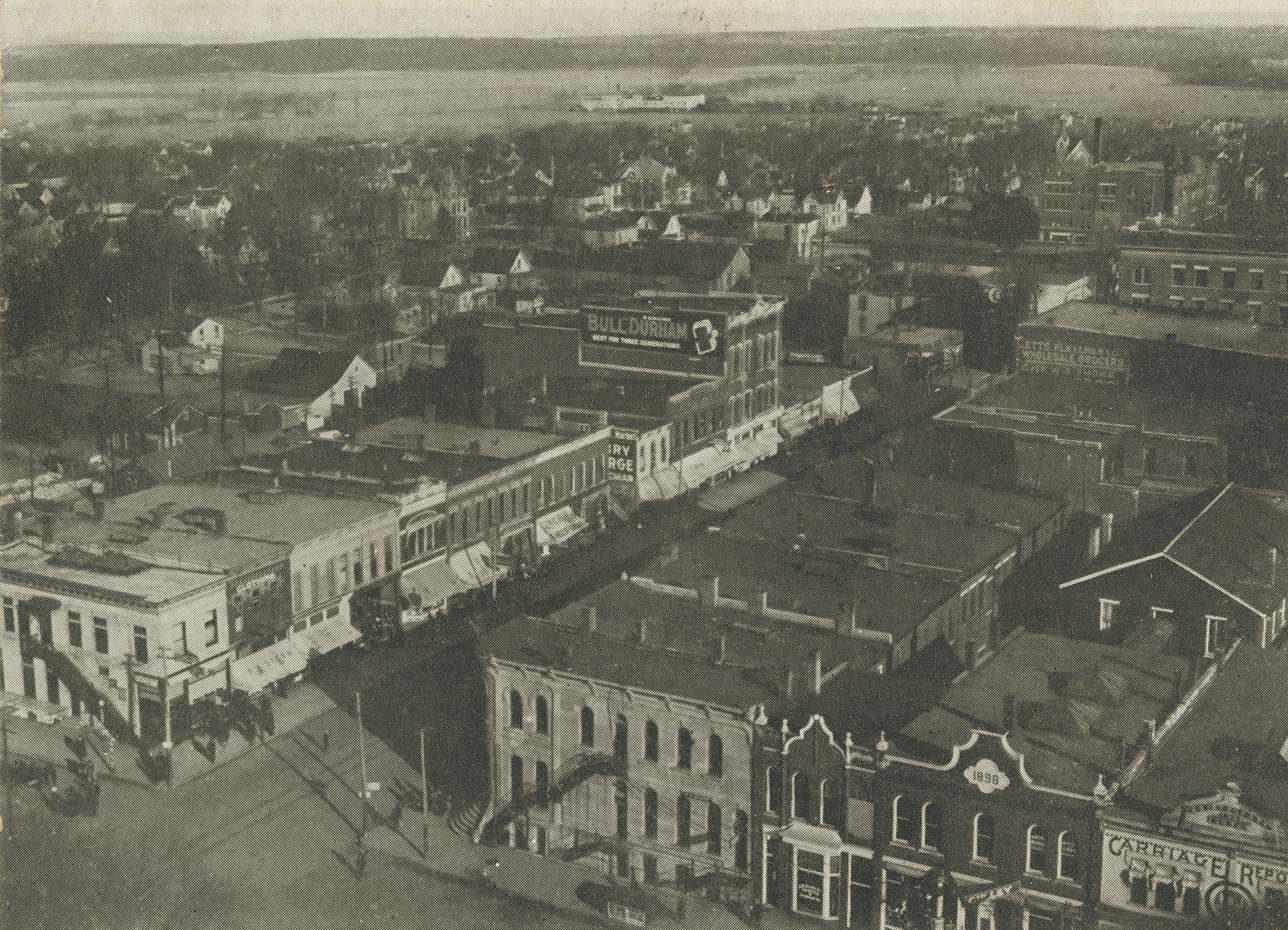
Main Street, 1910

Henry Anson was the first European settler in what is now called Marshalltown. In April 1851, Anson found what he described as “the prettiest place in Iowa.” On a high point between the Iowa River and Linn Creek, Anson built a log cabin. A plaque at 112 West Main Street marks the site of the cabin. In 1853 Anson named the town Marshall, after Marshall, Michigan, a former residence of his.

The town became Marshalltown in 1862 because another Marshall already existed in Henry County (In 1880, Marshall's name changed to Wayland). With the help of Potawatomi chief Johnny Green, Anson persuaded early settlers to stay in the area. In the mid-1850s, Anson donated land for a county courthouse. Residents donated money for the building's construction.

In 1863 the title of county seat transferred from the village of Marietta to Marshalltown. This event was the result of a considerable amount of political wrangling bordering on warfare. The determining factor was the location of the east/west railroad across Iowa and the winning company was the Cedar Rapids & Missouri River railroad under lease by the pioneer parent of the Chicago Northwestern Railway.

The young town then began growing. By 1900, Marshalltown had 10,000 residents. Many industries began developing in Marshalltown, like Fisher Controls, Lennox International and Marshalltown Company.

Marshalltown plays a small but significant role in the life of Ebe Dolliver, a main character in MacKinlay Kantor's Pulitzer Prize-winning novel "Andersonville" (1955).

=== Baseball ===
Adrian Constantine "Cap" Anson, son of Henry and Jennette Anson, was the first pioneer child born in the new town and is today known as Marshalltown's “first son.” Adrian became a Major League Baseball player and was inducted into the National Baseball Hall of Fame in 1939. He was regarded as one of the greatest players of his era and one of the first superstars of the game.

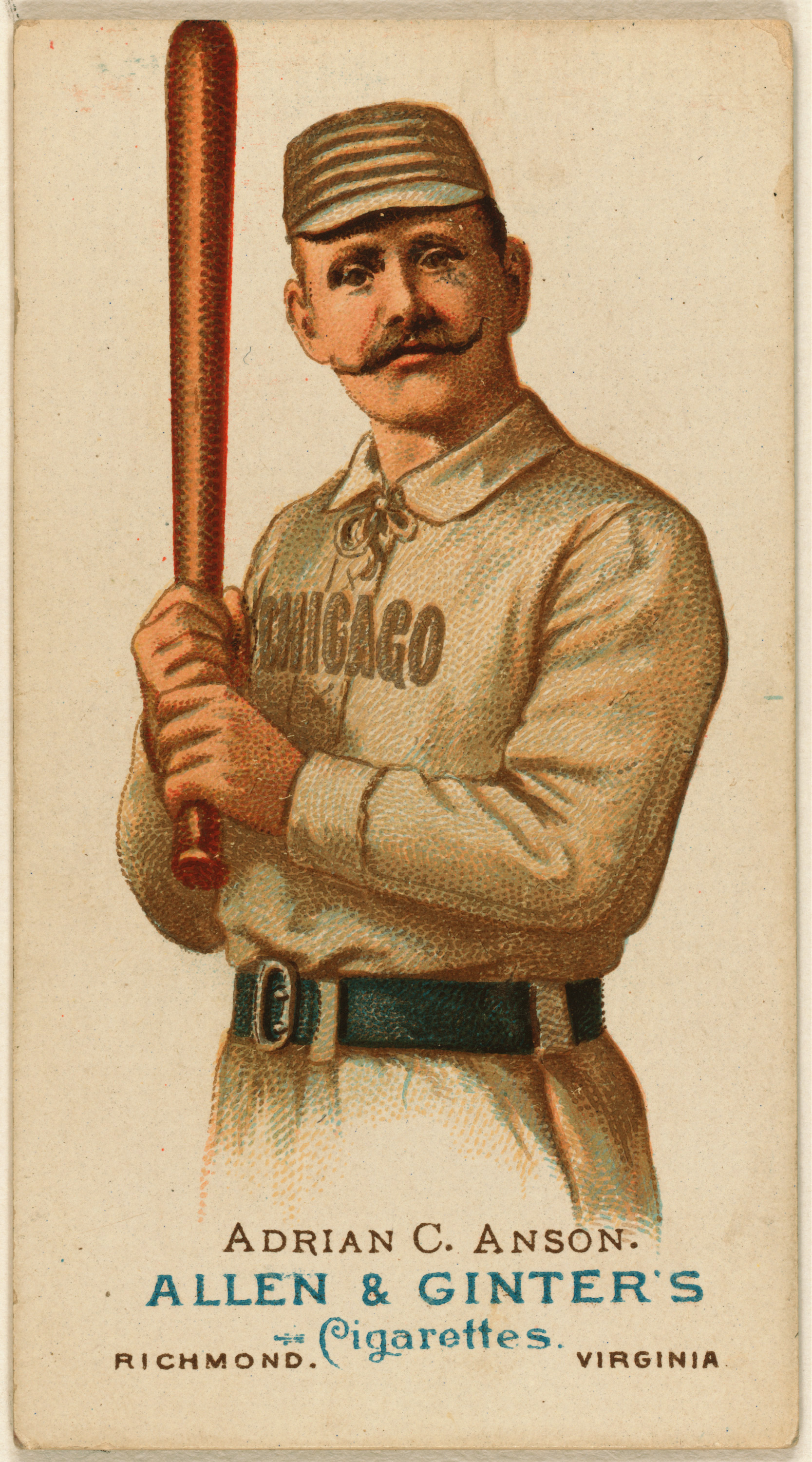
Adrian Cap Anson

Baseball steadily became popular as Marshalltown grew in the mid-1800s. Adrian's brother Sturgis also became a talented baseball player and both went to play on intra-school teams at the University of Notre Dame. Both later returned to Marshalltown to play baseball for the town team. Along with their father Henry, the town's founder, they put together a team and became the most prominent team in the state of Iowa. The Marshalltown team, with Henry Anson at third base, Adrian's brother Sturgis in center field, and Adrian at second base, won the Iowa state championship in 1868. In 1870 Marshalltown played an exhibition game with the talented Rockford Forest Citys. Although Marshalltown lost the game, Rockford's management offered contracts to all three of the Ansons. Adrian accepted the contract, which began his professional career in baseball in 1871.

Baseball continued its popularity in Marshalltown. In the early 1880s Billy Sunday played for the town baseball team. In 1882, with Sunday in left field, the Marshalltown team defeated the state champion Des Moines team 13–4. Marshalltown later formed a minor league team naming it after the Anson family, the Marshalltown Ansons. From 1914 to 1928 the team played in the Central Association and Mississippi Valley League.

=== Natural disasters ===
==== Tornado history ====
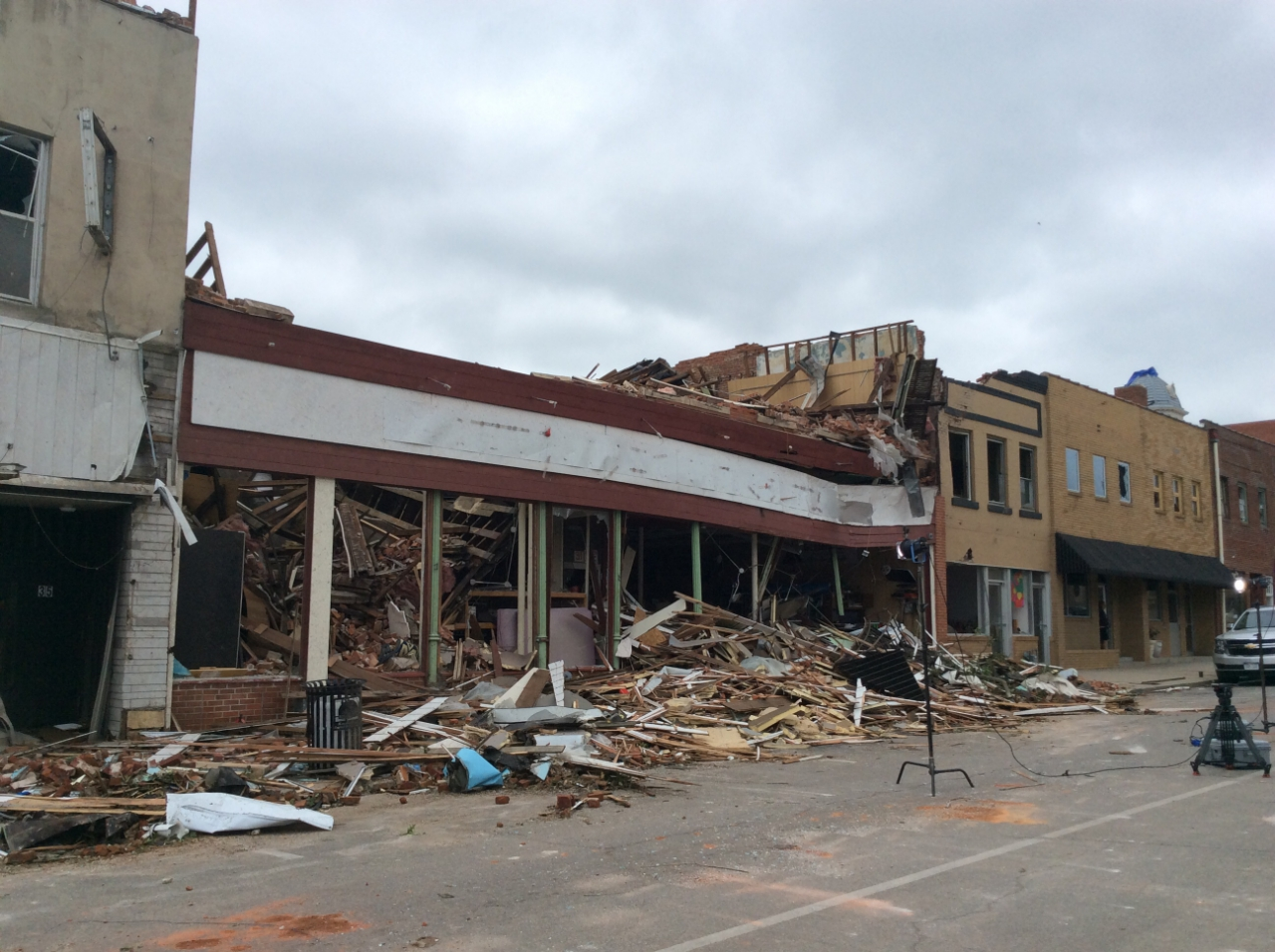
Major structural damage in downtown Marshalltown, Iowa, as a result of an EF3 tornado in July 2018.

On April 23, 1961, the south side of town was hit by an F3 tornado. It damaged numerous structures in the area, causing $1 million (1961 USD) in the town alone. It killed one person and injured 12. Marshalltown would be hit again on July 19, 2018, when another EF3 tornado with peak winds of 145 mph moved directly through downtown at 4:37 p.m. local time, which prompted the National Weather Service to issue a Tornado Emergency for eastern Marshall and southwestern Tama counties (which included Marshalltown.) It destroyed the spire from the top of the courthouse, while heavily damaging or destroying several homes, businesses, and historic downtown buildings. It was on the ground for 23 minutes along a 8.41-mile-long (13.53 km) path of destruction up to 1,200 yards (1,100 m) wide. Although there were no fatalities, 23 people were injured.

==== 2020 derecho ====
On August 10, 2020, Marshalltown was hit by a powerful derecho, which caused extensive damage throughout the city. Over a hundred cars parked near a factory had their windows blown out. Reports described 99 miles per hour (160 kilometers per hour; 44 meters per second) winds, roofs being ripped off, and loose wood debris embedded in the sides of buildings. One week after the storm, nearly 7,000 residents of the city were still waiting for power restoration; 99 percent restoration was achieved on August 23. The damage to public parks in the city and surrounding Marshall County was "extensive", particularly to trees.

=== Immigration ===
Marshalltown's Hispanic population in particular boomed in the 1990s and 2000s with immigrants mostly from Mexico, just like in many other Midwestern towns with meat-packing plants. Another smaller wave of Burmese refugees later arrived in the 2010s.

Federal law enforcement have twice raided the Swift & Company (now JBS) meatpacking plant, first in 1996 and again in 2006, arresting suspected undocumented immigrants for alleged identity theft. One study estimated the 2006 raid caused a 6-month to 1-year economic recession in the area. Explaining the 2006 raid's effect on the community, Police Chief Michael Tupper told The Washington Post in 2018 that “I think that there's just a lot of fear that it could happen again. It was a very traumatic experience for our community. Not just for the families and people that were directly impacted, but for our school system, for our local economy, for our community as a whole. It was, in many ways, a devastating experience.”

== Geography ==
According to the United States Census Bureau, the city has a total area of 19.193 square miles (49.71 km^{2}), of which 19.167 square miles (49.64 km^{2}) is land and 0.026 square miles (0.067 km^{2}) (0.14%) is water. Neighboring counties include Hardin and Grundy to the north, Tama to the east, Jasper to the south, and Story to the west.

=== Climate ===
According to the Köppen Climate Classification system, Marshalltown has a hot-summer humid continental climate, abbreviated "Dfa" on climate maps.

Climate data for Marshalltown, Iowa, 1991–2020 normals, extremes 1893–present
Month	Jan	Feb	Mar	Apr	May	Jun	Jul	Aug	Sep	Oct	Nov	Dec	Year
Record high °F (°C)	65 (18)	73 (23)	90 (32)	94 (34)	104 (40)	105 (41)	112 (44)	109 (43)	103 (39)	94 (34)	81 (27)	73 (23)	112 (44)
Mean maximum °F (°C)	49.2 (9.6)	55.2 (12.9)	70.9 (21.6)	81.8 (27.7)	88.2 (31.2)	91.8 (33.2)	93.3 (34.1)	91.5 (33.1)	89.4 (31.9)	82.9 (28.3)	68.8 (20.4)	54.5 (12.5)	94.6 (34.8)
Mean daily maximum °F (°C)	27.5 (−2.5)	32.3 (0.2)	45.4 (7.4)	59.5 (15.3)	70.7 (21.5)	80.4 (26.9)	83.5 (28.6)	81.5 (27.5)	75.4 (24.1)	62.2 (16.8)	46.5 (8.1)	33.5 (0.8)	58.2 (14.6)
Daily mean °F (°C)	18.2 (−7.7)	22.6 (−5.2)	35.1 (1.7)	47.7 (8.7)	59.6 (15.3)	69.8 (21.0)	73.1 (22.8)	70.6 (21.4)	63.0 (17.2)	50.4 (10.2)	36.4 (2.4)	24.5 (−4.2)	47.6 (8.7)
Mean daily minimum °F (°C)	9.0 (−12.8)	13.0 (−10.6)	24.9 (−3.9)	35.9 (2.2)	48.5 (9.2)	59.2 (15.1)	62.7 (17.1)	59.7 (15.4)	50.6 (10.3)	38.6 (3.7)	26.3 (−3.2)	15.6 (−9.1)	37.0 (2.8)
Mean minimum °F (°C)	−14.5 (−25.8)	−9.1 (−22.8)	3.2 (−16.0)	21.7 (−5.7)	33.7 (0.9)	46.8 (8.2)	51.9 (11.1)	49.3 (9.6)	35.4 (1.9)	23.0 (−5.0)	9.5 (−12.5)	−5.9 (−21.1)	−18.2 (−27.9)
Record low °F (°C)	−34 (−37)	−35 (−37)	−32 (−36)	4 (−16)	20 (−7)	35 (2)	42 (6)	35 (2)	20 (−7)	−3 (−19)	−11 (−24)	−28 (−33)	−35 (−37)
Average precipitation inches (mm)	0.97 (25)	1.16 (29)	2.10 (53)	3.82 (97)	4.94 (125)	5.93 (151)	4.58 (116)	4.37 (111)	3.65 (93)	2.66 (68)	2.10 (53)	1.39 (35)	37.87 (962)
Average snowfall inches (cm)	6.3 (16)	5.3 (13)	3.3 (8.4)	0.7 (1.8)	0.0 (0.0)	0.0 (0.0)	0.0 (0.0)	0.0 (0.0)	0.0 (0.0)	0.2 (0.51)	1.7 (4.3)	7.8 (20)	25.3 (64)
Average precipitation days (≥ 0.01 in)	6.6	6.6	7.6	10.8	12.9	11.7	9.0	9.2	8.5	8.7	6.5	7.0	105.1
Average snowy days (≥ 0.1 in)	4.1	4.2	1.6	0.3	0.0	0.0	0.0	0.0	0.0	0.3	1.0	4.1	15.6
Source: NOAA

== Demographics ==
Historical population
Census	Pop.	Note	%±
1860	981		—
1870	3,218		228.0%
1880	6,240		93.9%
1890	8,914		42.9%
1900	11,544		29.5%
1910	13,374		15.9%
1920	15,731		17.6%
1930	17,373		10.4%
1940	19,240		10.7%
1950	19,821		3.0%
1960	22,521		13.6%
1970	26,219		16.4%
1980	26,938		2.7%
1990	25,178		−6.5%
2000	26,009		3.3%
2010	27,552		5.9%
2020	27,591		0.1%
2024 (est.)	27,886		1.1%
U.S. Decennial Census; 2020 Census

=== Racial and ethnic composition ===
Marshalltown, Iowa – racial and ethnic composition Note: the US Census treats Hispanic/Latino as an ethnic category. This table excludes Latinos from the racial categories and assigns them to a separate category. Hispanics/Latinos may be of any race.
Race / ethnicity (NH = non-Hispanic)	Pop. 1990	Pop. 2000	Pop. 2010	Pop. 2020	% 1990	% 2000	% 2010	% 2020
White alone (NH)	24,323	21,754	19,360	15,892	96.60%	83.64%	70.27%	57.60%
Black or African American alone (NH)	252	331	568	708	1.00%	1.27%	2.06%	2.57%
Native American or Alaska Native alone (NH)	79	90	79	132	0.31%	0.35%	0.29%	0.48%
Asian alone (NH)	266	270	457	1,470	1.06%	1.04%	1.66%	5.33%
Pacific Islander alone (NH)	—	12	34	30	—	0.05%	0.12%	0.11%
Other race alone (NH)	10	35	24	49	0.04%	0.13%	0.09%	0.18%
Mixed race or multiracial (NH)	—	252	398	676	—	0.97%	1.44%	2.45%
Hispanic or Latino (any race)	248	3,265	6,632	8,634	0.98%	12.55%	24.07%	31.29%
Total	25,178	26,009	27,552	27,591	100.00%	100.00%	100.00%	100.00%

=== 2020 census ===
As of the 2020 census, there were 27,591 people, 10,275 households, and 6,588 families residing in the city.

The population density was 1,437.48 inhabitants per square mile (555.0/km^{2}). There were 11,248 housing units at an average density of 586.02 per square mile (226.3/km^{2}), of which 8.7% were vacant; 98.9% of residents lived in urban areas and 1.1% lived in rural areas.

There were 10,275 households, of which 33.2% had children under the age of 18 living in them. Of all households, 45.7% were married-couple households, 7.0% were cohabitating couples, 27.7% had a female householder with no spouse or partner present, and 19.5% had a male householder with no spouse or partner present. About 30.3% of all households were made up of individuals and 14.0% had someone living alone who was 65 years of age or older.

The homeowner vacancy rate was 1.5% and the rental vacancy rate was 10.7%.

The median age was 36.7 years; 26.4% of residents were under the age of 18 and 18.6% were 65 years of age or older. For every 100 females there were 101.0 males, and for every 100 females age 18 and over there were 99.8 males age 18 and over; the gender makeup of the city was 50.2% male and 49.8% female.

Racial composition as of the 2020 census
Race	Number	Percent
White	17,881	64.8%
Black or African American	738	2.7%
American Indian and Alaska Native	298	1.1%
Asian	1,470	5.3%
Native Hawaiian and Other Pacific Islander	30	0.1%
Some other race	3,974	14.4%
Two or more races	3,200	11.6%

=== 2010 census ===
As of the 2010 census, there were 27,552 people, 10,335 households, and 6,629 families residing in the city. The population density was 1,429.05 inhabitants per square mile (551.8/km^{2}). There were 11,171 housing units at an average density of 579.41 per square mile (223.7/km^{2}). The racial makeup of the city was 84.83% White, 2.21% African American, 0.58% Native American, 1.69% Asian, 0.16% Pacific Islander, 7.94% from some other races and 2.58% from two or more races. Hispanic or Latino people of any race were 24.07% of the population.

There were 10,335 households 33.0% had children under the age of 18 living with them, 47.1% were married couples living together, 11.9% had a female householder with no husband present, 5.2% had a male householder with no wife present, and 35.9% were non-families. 29.8% of households were one person and 12.6% were one person aged 65 or older. The average household size was 2.55 and the average family size was 3.18.

The median age was 37.3 years. 26.1% of residents were under the age of 18; 9.2% were between the ages of 18 and 24; 23.1% were from 25 to 44; 24.9% were from 45 to 64; and 16.7% were 65 or older. The gender makeup of the city was 49.8% male and 50.2% female.

=== 2000 census ===
As of the 2000 census, there were 26,009 people, 10,175 households, and 6,593 families residing in the city. The population density was 1,442.72 inhabitants per square mile (557.0/km^{2}). There were 10,857 housing units at an average density of 602.24 per square mile (232.5/km^{2}). The racial makeup of the city was 86.79% White, 1.34% African American, 0.37% Native American, 1.04% Asian, 0.07% Pacific Islander, 8.57% from some other races and 1.83% from two or more races. Hispanic or Latino people of any race were 12.55% of the population.

There were 10,175 households out of which 30.0% had children under the age of 18 living with them, 50.5% were married couples living together, 10.8% had a female householder with no husband present, and 35.2% were non-families. 29.7% of all households were made up of individuals and 13.5% had someone living alone who was 65 years of age or older. The average household size was 2.44 and the average family size was 3.02.

In the city the population was spread out with 24.5% under the age of 18, 8.9% from 18 to 24, 26.0% from 25 to 44, 23.0% from 45 to 64, and 17.6% who were 65 years of age or older. The median age was 38 years. For every 100 females there were 98.0 males. For every 100 females age 18 and over, there were 95.3 males.

The median income for a household in the city was $35,688, and the median income for a family was $45,315. Males had a median income of $32,800 versus $23,835 for females. The per capita income for the city was $19,113. About 8.8% of families and 12.5% of the population were below the poverty line, including 17.5% of those under age 18 and 10.6% of those age 65 or over.

=== Recent estimates ===
According to realtor website Zillow, the average price of a home as of November 30, 2025, in Marshalltown is $169,711.

As of the 2023 American Community Survey, there are 10,127 estimated households in Marshalltown with an average of 2.59 persons per household. The city has a median household income of $68,854. Approximately 14.0% of the city's population lives at or below the poverty line. Marshalltown has an estimated 63.5% employment rate, with 19.7% of the population holding a bachelor's degree or higher and 82.1% holding a high school diploma. There were 10,893 housing units at an average density of 568.32 per square mile (219.4/km^{2}).

== Economy ==
=== Local businesses ===
- Marshalltown Company, a manufacturer of American tools for many construction and archaeological applications, is based in Marshalltown.

=== Top employers ===
According to the city's 2024 Annual Comprehensive Financial Report, the largest employers in the city are:

Number	Employer	Industry	Number of employees
1	(JBS) Swift & Company	Pork processors	2,700
2	Emerson Electric Process Management/Fisher Controls	Valves and regulators manufacturer	1,100
3	Marshalltown Community School District	Education	900
4	Lennox Industries, Inc.	Furnace and air conditioning manufacturer	750
5	Iowa Veteran's Home	Hospital care facility	750
6	UnityPoint Health	Hospital	317
7	Walmart	Retail	300
8	HyVee Food Stores	Grocery store	286
9	Marshalltown Community College	Education	282
10	YMCA-YWCA	Sports and Fitness	207
11	Marshalltown Company	Tool manufacturing	200
12	City of Marshalltown	Municipal government	173
13	Marshall County	County government	171
14	McFarland Clinic PC	Medical clinic	170
—	—	Total	8,306

== Education ==
Marshalltown Community School District serves Marshalltown.

The first schoolhouse in Marshalltown was a log cabin built in 1853. The building stood on Main Street between Third and Fourth Streets. Neary Hoxie served as the first teacher.

In 1874, high school classes were held in an old building on North Center Street. The high school had 45 students and C. P. Rogers served as the school's superintendent.

As of 2020, there are multiple schools in Marshalltown. There are six elementary schools, one intermediate school, a Catholic school (PreK–6) and Christian school (1–8), and a middle school (7–8). There is also Marshalltown High School, with over 1,000 students. East Marshall Community School District serves small portions of the Marshalltown city limits. The district was established on July 1, 1992, by the merger of the LDF and SEMCO school districts. The BCLUW Community School District serves some rural areas nearby Marshalltown.

== Infrastructure ==
=== Transportation ===
U.S. Route 30 bypasses the town to the south, while Iowa Highway 14 runs through the center of town. An expressway, Iowa Highway 330 connects Marshalltown to Des Moines.

Marshalltown has bus (Marshalltown Municipal Transit or MMT) and taxicab services. It is also served by Trailways Coach Nationwide.

A municipal airport serves the county, approximately four miles north of town. The closest commercial airport is Des Moines International Airport, 53 miles (85.3 km) miles to the southwest.

Construction of the Cedar Rapids and Missouri River Railroad reached Marshalltown in 1862. This railroad was sold to the Chicago and North Western Railway in 1884, which itself was sold to Union Pacific Railroad in 1995. There has been no passenger rail service in Marshalltown since the last services there were discontinued in the early 1960s.

== Notable people ==
- Cap Anson, Major League Baseball player and manager, Baseball Hall of Fame in 1939
- Matthew Bucksbaum, businessman and philanthropist: with brothers Martin and Maurice co-founded General Growth Properties greatly accelerating modern post-war suburbanization
- Jerry Burke, pianist and organist from The Lawrence Welk Show
- Blean Calkins, radio sportscaster, president of National Sportscasters & Sportswriters Association 1979–1981
- Edwin N. Chapin (1823–1896), postmaster and newspaper publisher
- Nettie Sanford Chapin (1830–1901), teacher, historian, author, newspaper publisher, suffragist
- Jeff Clement, baseball player for University of Southern California, Pittsburgh Pirates and Minnesota Twins
- T. Nelson Downs, stage magician also known as "King of Koins"
- Jim Dunn, former owner of MLB's Cleveland Indians
- Joseph Carlton Petrone, US Ambassador to the United Nations Office at Geneva
- George Gardner Fagg, United States federal appellate judge
- Admiral Frank Jack Fletcher (1885–1973), commander during Battle of the Coral Sea and Battle of Midway
- Benjamin T. Frederick, U.S. Representative, Marshalltown city councilman
- Ben Hanford (1861–1910), two-time Socialist Party candidate for Vice President of the United States
- Frank Hawks, record-breaking aviator during 1920s and 1930s
- Anna Arnold Hedgeman (1899–1990), African American civil rights leader
- Clifford B. Hicks (1920–2010), children's book author
- Wally Hilgenberg (1942–2008), football player
- Mary Beth Hurt (1946–2026), film, television and stage actress, 3-time Tony Award nominee
- Toby Huss (1966– ), actor and voice actor, Adventures of Pete and Pete, National Lampoon's Vegas Vacation, King of the Hill, Halt and Catch Fire
- Laurence C. Jones (1884–1975), founder of Piney Woods Country Life School in Mississippi
- Lance Corporal Darwin Judge (1956–1975), one of last two soldiers killed in Vietnam War
- Noel T. Keen, plant physiologist
- Maury Kent (1885–1966), MLB player, Iowa, Iowa State and Northwestern coach
- Joseph Kosinski (1974– ), director of Disney film Tron Legacy
- Richard W. Lariviere (1950– ), president and CEO of Field Museum of Natural History
- Milo Lemert (1890–1918), received Medal of Honor for actions during World War I
- Dave Lennox, inventor and businessman, founded Lennox furnace manufacturing business in Marshalltown in 1895
- Meridean Maas (1934–2020), nurse, nursing professor at University of Iowa
- Vera McCord (1870s-1949), actress and film director, born in Marshalltown
- Elizabeth Ruby Miller (1905–1988), state legislator
- Merle Miller (1919–1986), novelist, activist
- Modern Life is War, hardcore punk band
- Allie Morrison (1904–1966), wrestler, world and Olympic champion
- Stephen B. Packard (1839–1922), Governor of Louisiana briefly in 1877
- Jim Rayburn (1909–1970), founder of Young Life
- Adolph Rupp (1901–1977), Hall of Fame college basketball coach, once head coach at Marshalltown High School
- Jean Seberg (1938–1979), actress, star of such films as Saint Joan, Breathless, Paint Your Wagon and Airport
- Lee Paul Sieg, former president of University of Washington
- Jimmy Siemers (b. 1982) – professional water skier
- Jeanne Rowe Skinner - American U.S. Navy officer and former First Lady of Guam.
- Wynn Speece (1917–2007), "Neighbor Lady" on WNAX (AM) for 64 years
- Billy Sunday (1862–1935), Major League Baseball player and Christian evangelist of early 20th Century
- Henry Haven Windsor (1859–1924), author, magazine editor, publisher, founder and first editor of Popular Mechanics
- Michelle Vieth, Mexican-American actress, born in Marshalltown
- Peter Zeihan (1973–), geopolitical strategist, author, and speaker
- Delano T. Smith (1830–1905), Minnesota lawyer, politician, and businessman

== Sister city relations ==
- Budyonnovsk, Stavropol Krai, Russia.
- Minami-Alps, Yamanashi, Japan.
- Zdolbuniv, Rivne region, Ukraine.
