= Marshalltown Company =

American construction equipment company

- Type: Private
- Founder: Jesse Williams, E. Lester Williams
- Headquarters: Marshalltown, Iowa, United States
- Key people: Dave Lennox
- Products: construction tools
- Website: http://www.marshalltown.com

Marshalltown Company is a privately held American manufacturer of construction tools and equipment used for archaeology, asphalt, concrete, drywall, EIFS, flooring, masonry, painting, plastering, stucco, tile, and wallpaper based in Marshalltown, Iowa. Marshalltown, founded in 1851, was one of the top producers of construction tools and equipment in the world, including the Marshalltown pointing trowel, a tool often used by American archaeologists.

== Company history ==
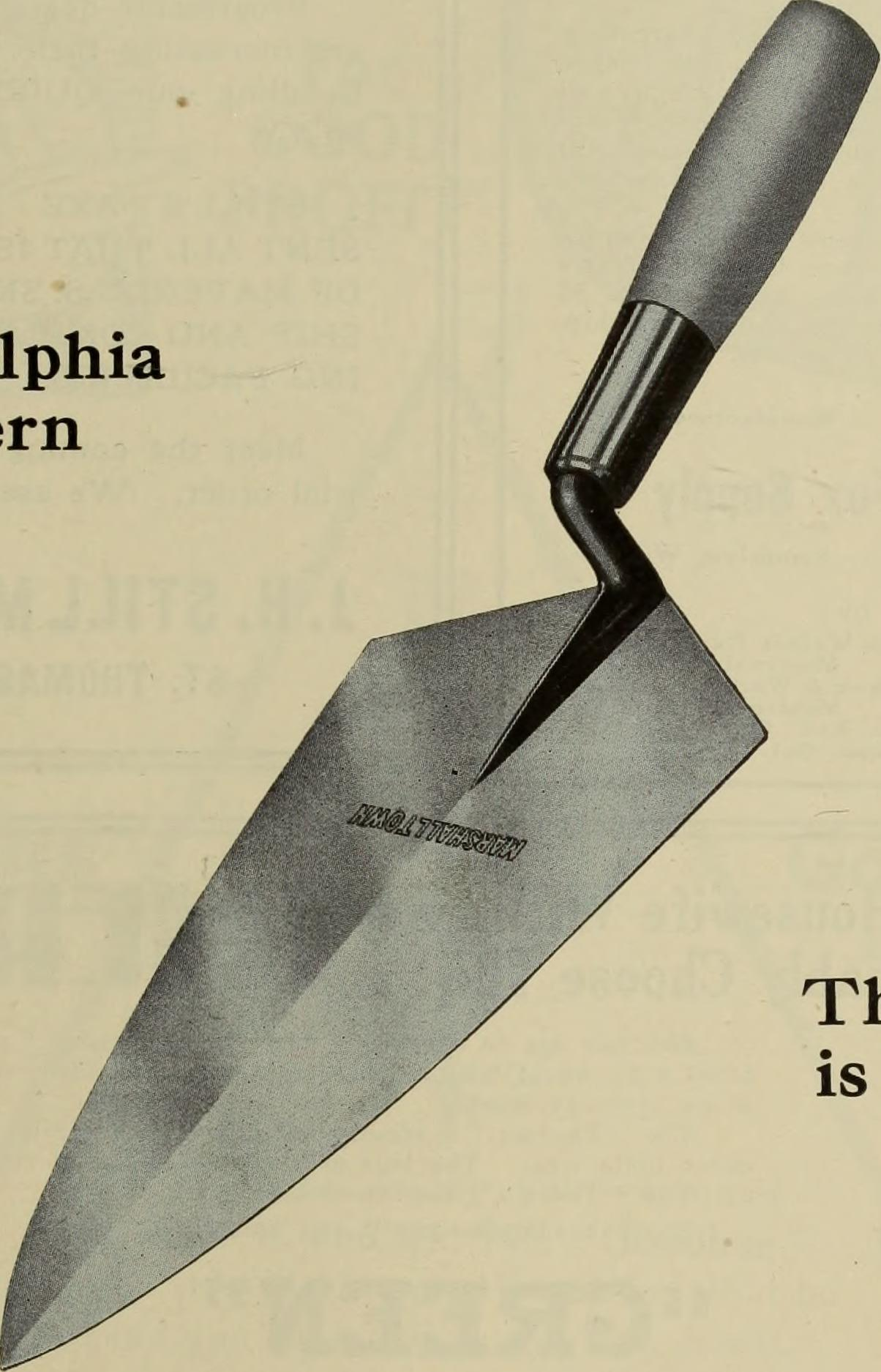
An advertisement for a Marshalltown Trowel from 1912.

The origins of Marshalltown can be traced back to the American inventor and entrepreneur Dave Lennox. While working in his machine shop in the mid-1880s in Marshalltown, Iowa, Mr. Lennox received a visit from a stonemason who asked him to make a better plastering trowel while working on the construction site of the Marshall County Courthouse.

Using the mason's criteria, Mr. Lennox forged the trowel and delivered it to the worker, who then showed it off to other masons in the area. Those masons considered the new trowel to be greatly improved and requested more. Mr. Lennox, having other interests, decided to forgo the opportunity and instead, in 1890, gave his apprentice, Jesse Williams, who ran a small machine shop, the charge of making the trowels.

In 1902 Jesse's brother, Lester Williams, entered into a partnership with him and built the Williams Brothers Machine shop on South 8th Avenue in Marshalltown, Iowa, the site where the current plant is located today.

By 1905 the brothers began specializing in trowels and referred to that part of the business as Marshalltown Trowel Works.

That same year the brothers acquired the services of salesman and promoter Al Higgin, who promoted their products across the country.

World War I introduced Marshalltown trowels to new markets. In 1918, Marshalltown sent 18,000 trowels overseas for US soldiers to use while working on European jobsites Soldiers stationed in France reported that masons building Pershing Stadium near Paris used and preferred Marshalltown trowels, and a general demand was created for the trowels as workers returned from the war.

Following World War II, new facilities were constructed and business remained strong during the postwar period. In the 1970s, the company saw substantial growth as a result of introducing new types of products and expanding overseas markets.

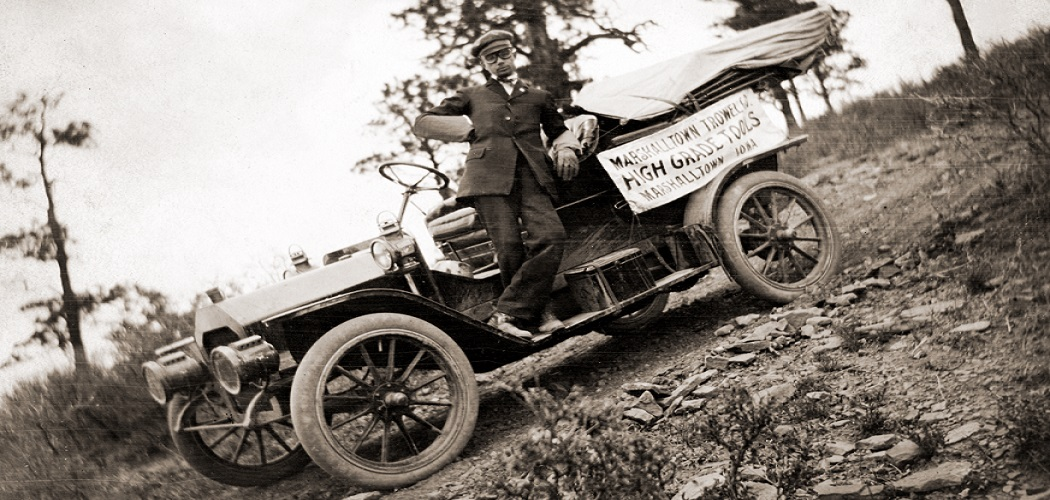
Al Higgin in His Sales Truck

Marshalltown purchased Vaughan & Bushnell Manufacturing, an Illinois-based manufacturer of hand tools, in May 2024.

== Business ==
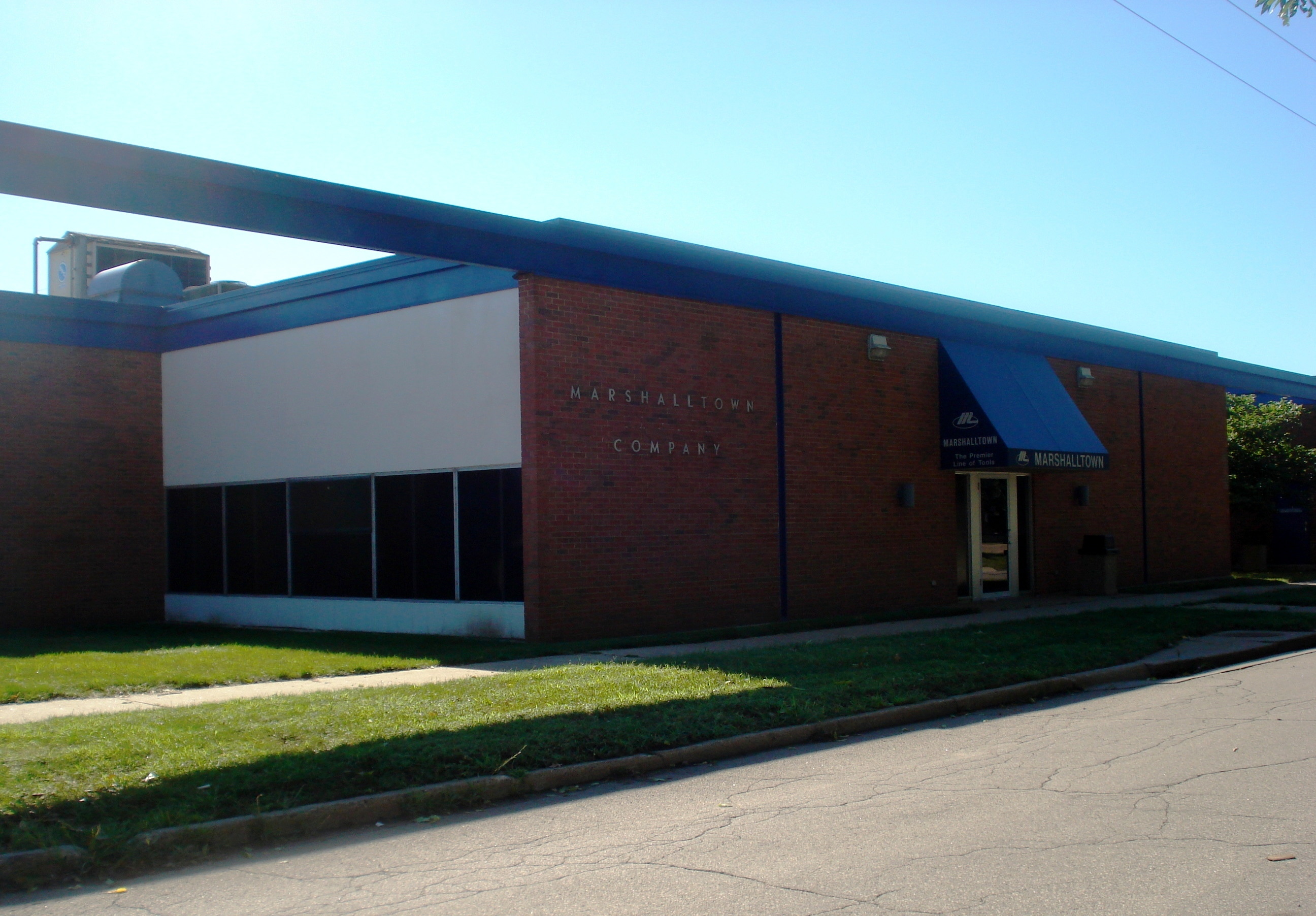
Marshalltown Company location in Marshalltown, Iowa.

Today, Marshalltown has expanded its product lines and markets since producing its first trowel in 1890. In addition to the original Marshalltown premier line of tools, the Q.L.T. line was introduced for the everyday handyman. Marshalltown tools are shipped globally and are used in such countries as Canada, Mexico, Great Britain, Australia, New Zealand, South Africa, Italy, the Netherlands, and Saudi Arabia.
