= Vaughan & Bushnell Manufacturing =

American company

- Company type: Subsidiary
- Industry: Manufacturing
- Founded: 1869 in Peoria, Illinois
- Founder: Alexander Vaughan
- Headquarters: Hebron, Illinois
- Products: Striking tools
- Owner: Marshalltown Company
- Number of employees: 130
- Website: vaughanmfg.com

Vaughan & Bushnell Manufacturing, also known as Vaughan Manufacturing and branded as simply Vaughan, is an American manufacturing company that specializes in the production of hammers, axes, prybars, and hand saws. The company produces more than 250 different kinds of hammers.

== History ==
Vaughan was founded in 1869 in Chicago, Illinois by Alexander Vaughan, an 18-year-old blacksmith, as a plumbing business. Vaughan soon set up a blacksmith shop behind a hardware store in Chicago owned by Sidney Bushnell. On June 15, 1869, Vaughan was granted a patent for an improved post auger and began producing custom tools.

In 1871, much of the company was destroyed in the Great Chicago Fire, and Bushnell invested additional funds for the company, which was incorporated in 1882 as the Vaughan and Bushnell Manufacturing Company. The company began shifting its focus to hammers, hatchets, axes, and wrecking bars.

In 1922, the Vaughan family bought out the Bushnell family's interests in the company, and in 1940 opened a factory in the nearby (and unrelated) city of Bushnell. In 1963, company's headquarters were relocated to Hebron, Illinois. In 1993, the company became the first striking tool manufacturer to receive ISO 9002 certification.

The company announced plans to close in 2024 due to financial difficulties, but was acquired in May of that year by Marshalltown Hammer, a division of the Marshalltown Company.

== Gallery ==
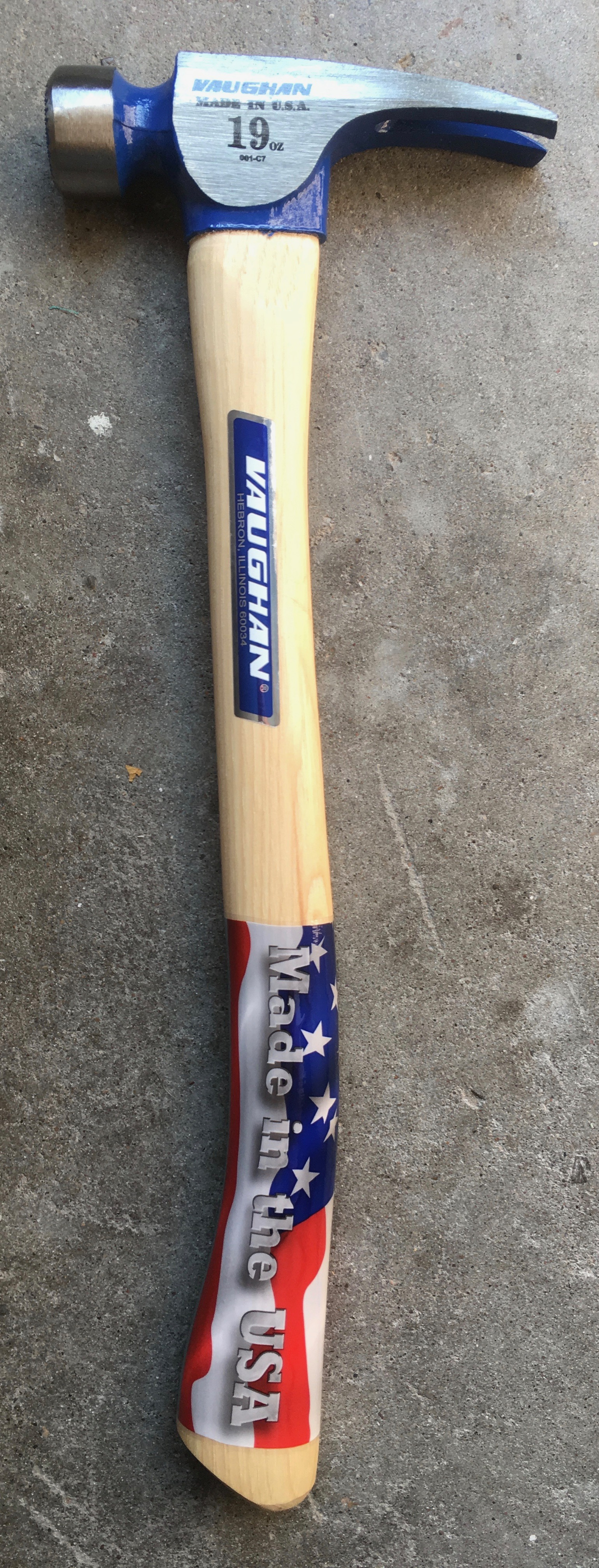
A Vaughan "California Framer" framing hammer.
