= Calkin (surname) =

Calkin is a surname. Notable people with the surname include:

- Hervey C. Calkin (1828–1913), American politician from New York
- James Calkin (1786–1862), English composer, organist and teacher, father of John Baptiste
- John Baptiste Calkin, English composer, organist and music teacher
- John Williams Calkin, mathematician
- Neil J. Calkin, mathematician

== See also ==
- Calkins (surname)
