= Helen Calkins =

American mathematician (1893–1970)

- Born: October 20, 1893; Quincy, Illinois
- Died: June 17, 1970 (aged 76); Quincy, Illinois
- Education: Knox College; Columbia University; Cornell University
- Occupations: Mathematician, professor
- Known for: Earned math PHD before World War II

Helen Calkins (1893–1970) was an American mathematician and professor, and one of the few women to earn a PhD in mathematics in the United States before World War II.

== Biography ==
Helen Calkins was born on October 20, 1893, to Anna Burns Schermerhorn and Addison Niles Calkins, in Quincy, Illinois. The eldest of two daughters, she was a student at Quincy High School from 1908–1912 and then she attended Knox College in Galesburg, Illinois, starting in 1912, graduating in 1916 with a special honor in mathematics. Her first job was teaching math at a junior high school in Quincy. In 1917 she taught at the senior high school in Jacksonville, Illinois for a year before returning to Knox College as a math instructor 1918–1920. In February 1932 at Columbia University (1920–1921) she earned her master's degree with the thesis: The unity in mathematics, as illustrated by a certain differential equation.

In February 1932, Calkins was awarded her PhD from Cornell; her advisors were: Charles F. Roos and David Clinton Gillespie. Her dissertation was titled, Some Implicit Functional Theorems, which concerned "a problem of maximizing a functional not of the ordinary calculus of variations type." Roos referred to it writing "I think that Miss Calkins' thesis is of unusual interest."

Calkins joined the math department at the Pennsylvania College for Women (now Chatham University) in Pittsburgh, where she was usually the only member of the mathematics department that she headed. She enjoyed service on faculty committees, especially those concerning course curriculum and the library. With the start of World War II in 1941, Calkins became a statistician in engineering defense training at the Pennsylvania State College. In 1943, she spent a year at the University of Minnesota, to teach math to pre-flight cadets. Calkins retired as professor emeritus in 1957, from the school then known as Chatham College.

Helen Calkins died on June 17, 1970, at the Good Samaritan Home in Quincy, Illinois of heart disease. She was 76 years of age.

== Memberships ==
According to Judy Green, Calkins belonged to the Delta Delta Delta social sorority, the Pi Lambda Theta education honor and professional association, the College Club of Pittsburgh, and the Daughters of the American Revolution as well as several professional societies.

- American Mathematical Society
- Mathematical Association of America
- Sigma Delta Epsilon
- American Association of University Professors
- Phi Mu Epsilon
