= Framing hammer =

Form of claw hammer

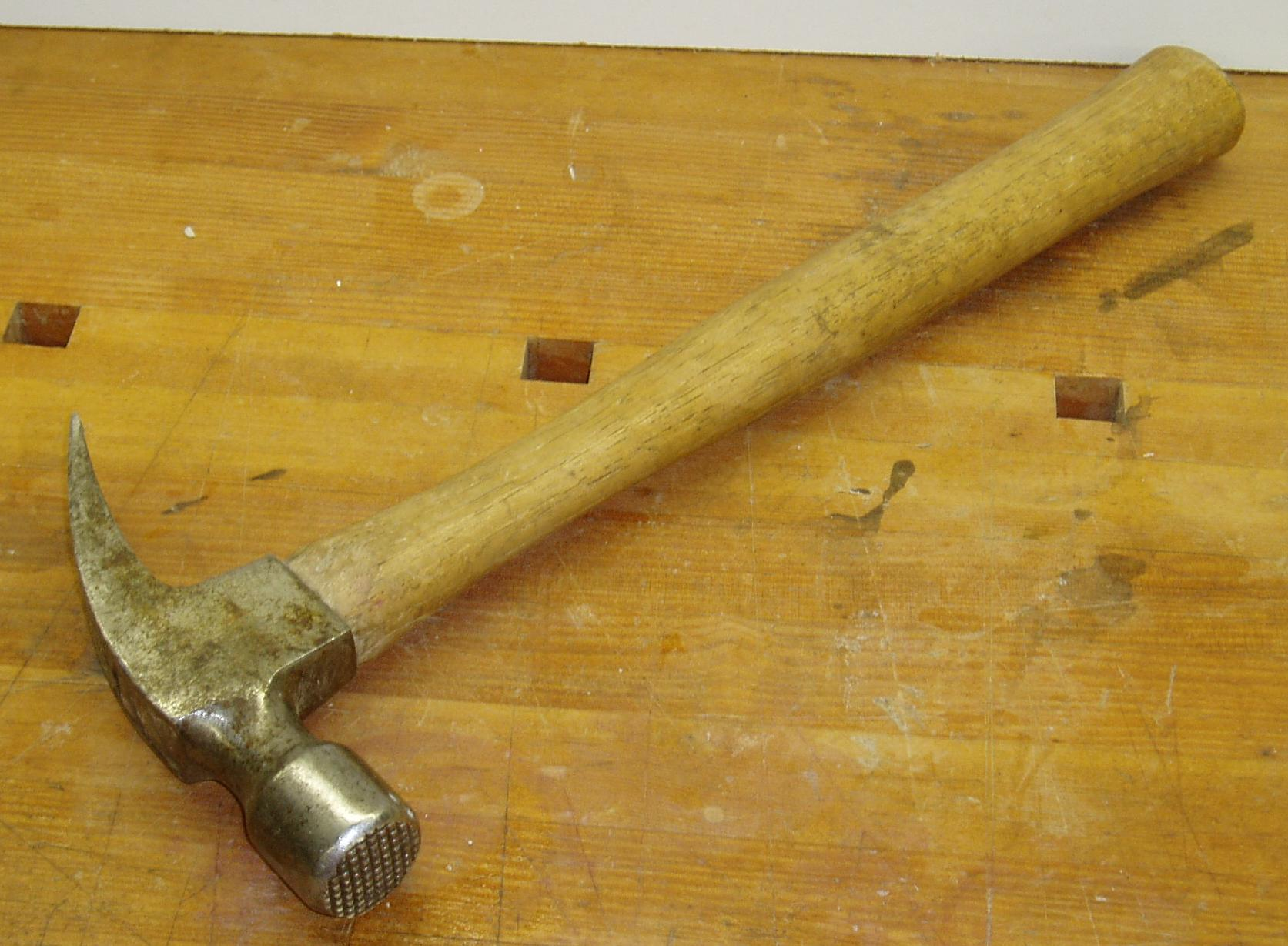
22-ounce wooden-handled traditional framing hammer with milled head and "straight" claw

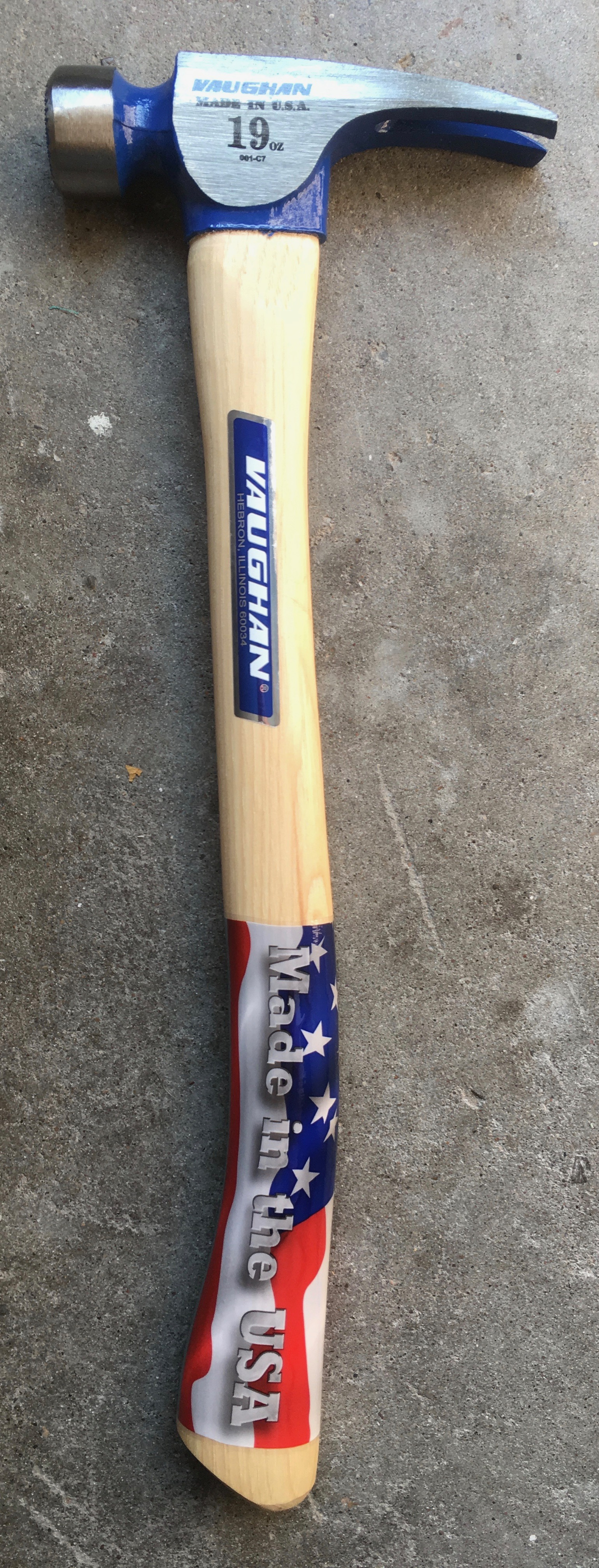
A 19-ounce hatchet-handled Vaughan "California Framer"

A framing hammer is a form of claw hammer used for heavy wood construction, particularly house framing and concrete formwork. It is a heavy duty rip hammer with a straight claw and a wood, metal, or fiberglass handle. Head weights vary from 20 to 32 ounces (567 to 907 grams) for steel, and 12 to 16 ounces (340 to 454 grams) for titanium. Heavy heads, longer handles and milled faces allow for driving large nails quickly into dimensional lumber. Other features include a sharp checkerboard "milled" face for gripping nails, and, since the 1980s, an unusually large and short face for increasing driving area without increasing weight.

Extremely straight claws, large, short face, and exceptionally long handles, including with a curved hatchet-styled grip, are traits of what is known as a "California framer".

== Characteristics ==
The milled face of the head consists of a waffle-like grid of small four sided pyramids. Nails typically used for framing have a grid of intersecting raised metal lines on the head of the nail. The raised marks on the head of the hammer grip this grid, which helps to prevent the hammer from sliding off the nail head when striking a nail. Since the frame typically will not be seen on the finished house, the inevitable marring of wood surfaces by the milled hammer face is not an issue. A hammer with a smooth striking surface is known as a finishing hammer and is used where marring of the wood is to be avoided for cosmetic reasons. Some framing hammers have a magnetized slot along the top edge of the striking surface to hold a nail. This allows the nail to be placed and driven quickly with just one hand.

The straight claw serves the dual purpose of removing nails and acting as a crowbar to pry apart (rip) lumber. It does not have as much leverage for removing nails as a curved claw hammer when using the face of the claw as the fulcrum, but the handle can be pulled to the side to greatly increase leverage by using a very short fulcrum. For pulling nails, a wooden block can be placed under the head of the hammer close to the nail to increase leverage.

Wooden handles are usually made of hickory, an extremely tough wood, but can be readily broken if one misses the nail and hits the handle instead. Broken wooden handles can often be replaced. Single piece steel hammers are available and are the most durable, but typically do not absorb the shock of the hammer blows well. Fiberglass is becoming a common handle material due to its increased durability and shock and vibration absorbing capabilities. Steel and fiberglass handles generally have rubber or rubber-like grips for increased comfort and better grip. Low quality rubber handled hammers are known to often separate from the hammer and cause injury to the user. Wooden hammers have relatively little grip, which can allow the hammer to slide from the hand. Some carpenters and other users prefer this, as they can begin a stroke by gripping the hammer towards the center of the handle, and allow the handle to slide through their hand as they swing. This allows greater control during the beginning of the stroke, but increased leverage and more power when the hammer actually strikes the nail.

Light-weight titanium heads with longer handles allow for increased velocity, resulting in greater energy delivery, while decreasing arm fatigue and risk of carpal tunnel syndrome.

Framing hammers have increasingly been replaced by nail guns for the majority of nails driven on a wood-framed house.
