= Lennox International =

American climate control product manufacturer

Lennox International Inc.
- Type: Public
- Traded as: NYSE: LII; S&P 500 component
- Industry: HVAC
- Founded: 1895; 131 years ago
- Founder: Dave Lennox
- Headquarters: Richardson, Texas, U.S.
- Key people: Alok Maskara (CEO)
- Revenue: ▲US$5.34 billion (2024)
- Operating income: ▲US$1.03 billion (2024)
- Net income: ▲US$807 million (2024)
- Total assets: ▲US$3.47 billion (2024)
- Total equity: ▲US$850 million (2024)
- Owner: John W. Norris, III (9.8%)
- Number of employees: 14,200 (2024)
- Website: lennox.com

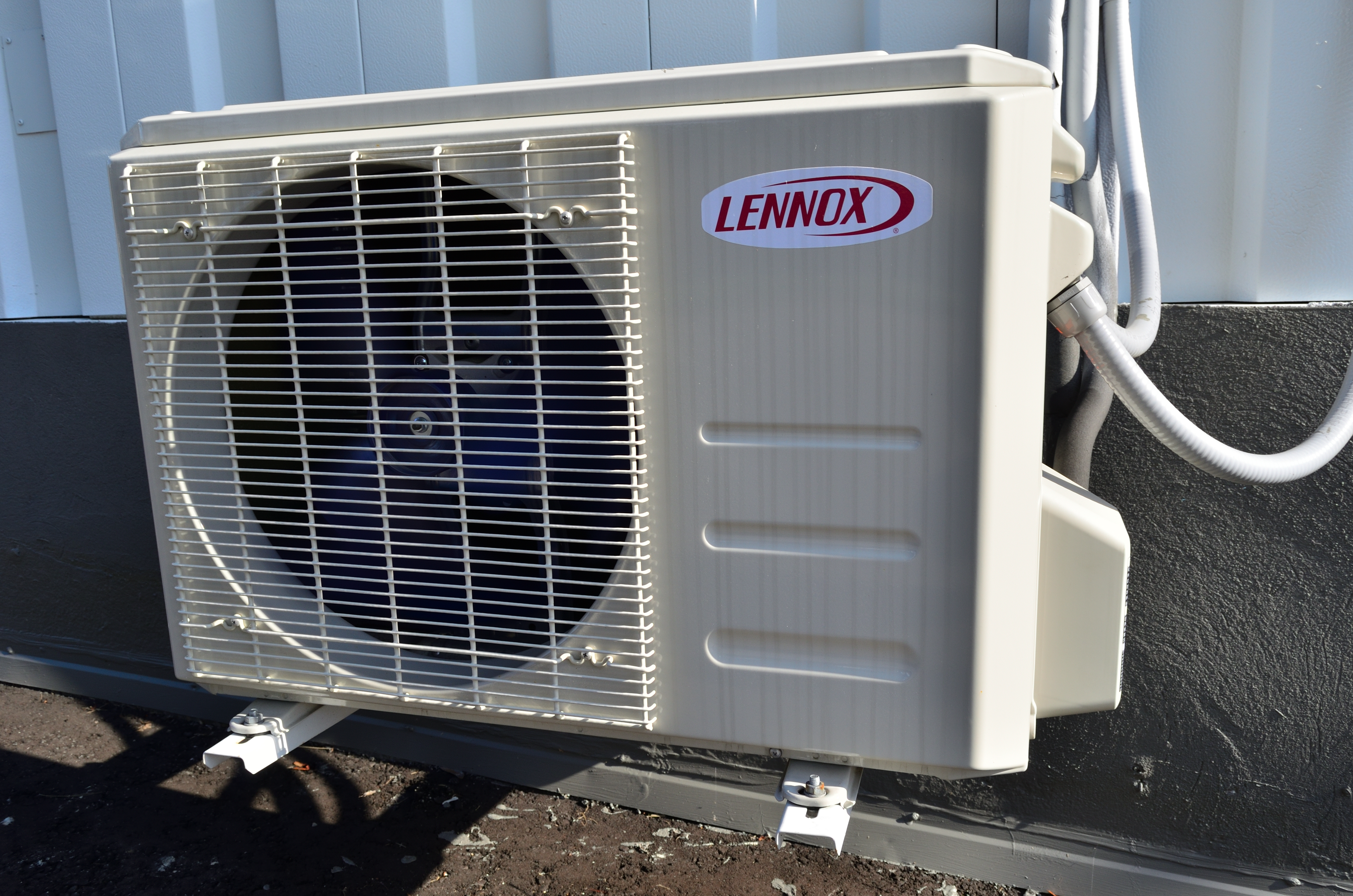
A Lennox air conditioner

Lennox International Inc. is an American provider of climate control products for the heating, ventilation, and air conditioning (HVAC) and refrigeration markets. Based in Richardson, Texas, the company is 9.8% owned by John W. Norris, III, a descendant of DW Norris, who acquired the company in 1904. The company's largest production facilities are in Saltillo, Mexico, Marshalltown, Iowa, and Orangeburg, South Carolina.

== History ==
Previous logo

The company was founded in 1895, in Marshalltown, Iowa, by Dave Lennox, the owner of a machine repair business for railroads. Inventors Ezra William Smith and Ernest Bryant brought their idea for a riveted steel coal-fired furnace to his machine shop to build parts for a prototype. In lieu of payment, Lennox accepted their patent, obtaining rights to the idea and founded the Lennox Furnace Co.

In 1904, DW Norris acquired the company. He managed the company until his death in 1949.

From 1964 to 1965, Lennox produced a small crawler tractor and mower called the Lennox Kitty Track 600. It featured a 6 hp (4.5 kW) Briggs & Stratton engine and a 32" mower deck.

In 1999, the company became a public company via an initial public offering.

A 2018 tornado destroyed the plant in Marshalltown, but the company would rebuild it. As of 2024, there were over 750 workers employed at that location.

=== Acquisitions and divestitures ===
In 1971, the company sold its low pressure gas cylinder business to Worthington Industries.

In 1973, Lennox acquired Heatcraft, including the Larkin, Bohn, Chandler, and Climate Control brands.

In 1998, the company acquired Pyro Industries, a manufacturer of pellet stoves.

In December 2010, the company acquired Kysor/Warren from The Manitowoc Company for $138 million.

In September 2023, the company sold its European commercial HVAC and refrigeration businesses to funds managed by Syntagma Capital.

In October 2023, the company acquired AES.

== Brands ==
The company operates the following brands:

=== Home Comfort Solutions ===
- Lennox
- Armstrong Air
- Ducane
- AirEase
- Concord Air
- MagicPak
- ADP Advanced Distributor Products
- Allied Air
- Heat Controller
- Healthy Climate Solutions
- Lennox Stores

=== Building Climate Solutions ===
- Lennox
- Model L
- CORE
- Enlight
- Xion
- Energence
- Prodigy
- Strategos
- Raider
- Lennox VRF
- Lennox National Account Services
- Allied Commercial
- Elite
- AES Industries
- AES Mechanical
- ES Reclaim
- Heatcraft Worldwide Refrigeration
- Bohn
- MAGNA
- Larkin
- Climate Control
- Chandler Refrigeration
- Frigua-Bohn
- IntelliGen
- Interlink
- Supco/Dura-dyne

== Legal issues ==
In 1998, the company paid $6.2 million to settle an age discrimination lawsuit brought by 11 former employees and the Equal Employment Opportunity Commission, after the employees, who were 41 to 58 years old, were fired or demoted.

In 2026, Lennox was named along with several other major HVAC manufacturers in proposed federal class-action lawsuits alleging that the companies conspired to raise and coordinate prices for HVAC equipment. One lawsuit, filed by an HVAC contractor in the United States District Court for the Eastern District of Michigan, named Lennox International and Lennox Industries as defendants along with manufacturers including Carrier Global, Trane Technologies, Daikin, Rheem, Bosch and AAON. The complaint alleged violations of federal antitrust law.

In May 2026, the federal court consolidated the related cases for pretrial proceedings and stayed discovery pending further proceedings.
