= Calkins, Montana =

Ghost town in Meagher County, Montana

Coordinates: 46°26′30″N 110°55′16″W

Calkins is a ghost town in Meagher County, in the U.S. state of Montana.

== History ==
A post office was established in Calkins in 1915, and remained in operation until it was discontinued in 1930. The town was named for R. M. Calkins, a railroad official.
