= Blean Calkins =

American sports broadcaster (1921–2003)

Blean Anson Calkins (August 11, 1921 – March 16, 2003) was a sports radio broadcaster for over 30 years. He was President of the National Sportscasters and Sportswriters Association (NSSA) from 1978 to 1981, and served on the NSSA Board with such contemporaries as Curt Gowdy, Chris Schenkel, Keith Jackson and Ray Scott. He was named Iowa's Sportscaster of the Year four times.

Calkins broadcast Iowa Hawkeyes basketball and football home games along with Iowa high school athletics on KWPC out of Muscatine for over 30 years. Calkins also did morning drive sports on album rock 99 Plus through most of the 1980s, and sold advertising on at KFMH and KWPC.

== Awards ==
- Iowa Sportscaster of the Year award: 1969, 1974, 1975, 1976
- He received the News Media Award in 1982 from the Iowa High School Athletics Association
- Iowa High School Athletic Directors Association award for Outstanding Contributions to High School Athletics, 1993

== Personal life ==
Blean Calkins was married to Bonnie Calkins, and had a son, Doug. His wife died in 1998, and he died in his sleep at home in Muscatine in 2003, at the age of 81. He had been living with a heart ailment since suffering a massive heart attack in 1989.
