= Lincoln School =

Lincoln School may refer to:

== United Kingdom ==
- Lincoln Grammar School was a boys' grammar and boarding school on Wragby Road in Lincoln, Lincolnshire which in 1974 became Lincoln Christ's Hospital School, a co-educational comprehensive school
- Lincoln School of Art became part of De Montfort University in 1994, then part of the University of Lincoln in 2001

== United States ==
=== Alabama ===
- Lincoln School (Huntsville, Alabama), listed on the National Register of Historic Places (NRHP)
- Lincoln Normal School, a middle school in Marion, Alabama

=== California ===
- Lincoln School (Paso Robles, California), listed on the NRHP in San Luis Obispo County, California

=== Colorado ===
- Lincoln School (Erie, Colorado), listed on the NRHP in Weld County, Colorado
- Lincoln School (Fort Morgan, Colorado), listed on the NRHP
- Lincoln School (La Junta, Colorado), listed on the NRHP in Colorado

=== Idaho ===
- Lincoln School (Twin Falls, Idaho), listed on the NRHP in Idaho

=== Illinois ===
- Abraham Lincoln School for Social Science (Chicago, Illinois), defunct social workers school
- Lincoln School (Rock Island, Illinois), listed on the NRHP

=== Iowa ===
- Lincoln School (Davenport, Iowa), listed on the NRHP
- Lincoln School (Farley, Iowa), listed on the NRHP
- Lincoln School (Oskaloosa, Iowa), listed on the NRHP

=== Kansas ===
- Lincoln School (Atchison, Kansas), listed on the NRHP in Kansas
- Lincoln School (Newton, Kansas), listed on the NRHP in Kansas

=== Kentucky ===
- Lincoln School (Paducah, Kentucky), listed on the NRHP in Kentucky

=== Maine ===
- Lincoln School (Acton, Maine), listed on the NRHP

=== Massachusetts ===
- Lincoln School (Winchester, Massachusetts), listed on the NRHP in Massachusetts

=== Michigan ===
- Lincoln School (Iron River, Michigan), listed on the NRHP in Michigan

=== Minnesota ===
- Lincoln School (Eveleth, Minnesota), a former elementary school, now home to the East Range Developmental Achievement Center
- Lincoln School Building (Virginia, Minnesota), listed on the NRHP

=== Missouri ===
- Lincoln School (Canton, Missouri), listed on the NRHP
- Lincoln School (Springfield, Missouri), listed on the NRHP
- Lincoln School (Vandalia, Missouri), listed on the NRHP

=== Montana ===
- Lincoln School (Missoula, Montana), listed on the NRHP in Montana

=== New York ===
- Lincoln School (Hornell, New York), listed on the NRHP
- Lincoln School for Nurses, New York City, New York, a private nursing school in The Bronx (1898–1961)
- New Lincoln School, New York City, New York, a private school in Manhattan (1948–1988)

=== Oregon ===
- Lincoln High School (Portland, Oregon)

=== Rhode Island ===
- Lincoln School (Providence, Rhode Island)

=== South Dakota ===
- Lincoln School (Belle Fourche, South Dakota), listed on the NRHP in South Dakota
- Lincoln School No. 12 in Meckling, South Dakota, listed on the NRHP in South Dakota

=== Tennessee ===
- Lincoln School (Pikeville, Tennessee), listed on the NRHP

=== West Virginia ===
- Lincoln School in Wheeling, West Virginia, predecessor of Lincoln High School (Wheeling, West Virginia)

=== Wisconsin ===
- Lincoln School (Madison, Wisconsin), listed on the NRHP in Wisconsin
- Lincoln Elementary School, in the Madison Metropolitan School District
- Lincoln School (Racine, Wisconsin), listed on the NRHP
- Lincoln School (Shawano, Wisconsin), listed on the NRHP

=== Wyoming ===
- Lincoln School (Laramie, Wyoming), listed on the NRHP

== Schools with related names ==
=== Schools named Lincoln Middle School ===
- Lincoln County Middle School (disambiguation), multiple schools
- Lincoln Middle School (disambiguation), multiple schools

=== K-8 schools ===
- Abraham Lincoln Elementary School, Chicago, Illinois
- Lincoln School in Brookline, Massachusetts
- Lincoln Public Schools, Lincoln, Massachusetts
- Lincoln Public Schools, Nebraska

== See also ==
- Lincoln Academy (disambiguation)
- Lincoln College (disambiguation)
- Lincoln Elementary School (disambiguation)
- Lincoln High School (disambiguation)
- Lincoln Institute (disambiguation)
- Lincoln Law School (disambiguation)
- Lincoln University (disambiguation)
- Asociación Escuelas Lincoln, Buenos Aires, Argentina
- Lincoln-Way Community High School District
