= Lincoln High School =

Lincoln High School may refer to:

== Costa Rica ==
- Lincoln School (Costa Rica), San José, Costa Rica

== New Zealand ==
- Lincoln High School (New Zealand), Christchurch, New Zealand

== United States ==
=== Alabama ===
- Lincoln Normal School, Marion, Alabama

=== Arkansas ===
- Lincoln High School in Camden, Arkansas, a school for African Americans shut down in 1970 after desegregation
- Lincoln High School (Lincoln, Arkansas)
- Lincoln High School (Fort Smith, Arkansas), segregated black school operating between 1892 and 1966

=== California ===
- Lincoln High School (Lincoln, California)
- Lincoln High School (San Diego, California)
- Lincoln High School (Stockton, California)

=== Florida ===
- Lincoln High School (Gainesville, Florida)
- Lincoln High School (Riviera Beach, Florida), defunct segregated black school in the School District of Palm Beach County
- Lincoln High School (Tallahassee, Florida)
- Old Lincoln High School, Tallahassee, Florida
- Lincoln Memorial High School, Bradenton, Florida

=== Idaho ===
- Lincoln High School (Idaho Falls, Idaho)

=== Illinois ===
- East St. Louis Lincoln High School, East St. Louis, Illinois, consolidated in 1998
- Lincoln Community High School, Lincoln, Illinois

=== Indiana ===
- Vincennes Lincoln High School, Vincennes, Indiana
- Lincoln Senior High School (Cambridge City, Indiana)

=== Kansas ===
- Lincoln Junior and Senior High School, Lincoln Center, Kansas

=== Kentucky ===
- Lincoln High School (Paducah, Kentucky)

=== Maine ===
- Lincoln High School (Maine), Lincoln, Maine, now Mattanawcook Academy

=== Maryland ===
- Lincoln High School (Maryland), Rockville, segregated black school renamed George Washington Carver in 1951

=== Massachusetts ===
- Lincoln-Sudbury Regional High School, Sudbury

=== Michigan ===
- Lincoln High School (Warren, Michigan)
- Lincoln High School (Ypsilanti, Michigan)

=== Missouri ===
- Lincoln High School (Kansas City, Missouri), renamed Lincoln College Preparatory Academy in 1986

=== Nebraska ===
- Lincoln High School (Lincoln, Nebraska)
- Lincoln East High School, Lincoln, Nebraska
- Lincoln North Star High School, Lincoln, Nebraska
- Lincoln Northeast High School, Lincoln, Nebraska
- Lincoln Southeast High School, Lincoln, Nebraska
- Lincoln Southwest High School, Lincoln, Nebraska

=== New Jersey ===
- Lincoln High School (New Jersey), Jersey City, New Jersey

=== New York ===
- Lincoln High School (Yonkers, New York)

=== North Carolina ===
- Lincoln High School (Chapel Hill, North Carolina), segregated black school

=== Ohio ===
- Lincoln High School (Canton, Ohio)
- Lincoln High School (Gahanna, Ohio)
- Lincoln-West High School, Cleveland

=== Oregon ===
- Lincoln High School (Portland, Oregon)

=== Pennsylvania ===
- Lincoln High School (Ellwood City, Pennsylvania)

=== Rhode Island ===
- Lincoln High School (Rhode Island)

=== South Carolina ===
- Lincoln High School (McClellanville, South Carolina)
- Lincoln High School (Sumter, South Carolina)

=== South Dakota ===
- Lincoln High School (South Dakota), Sioux Falls, South Dakota

=== Texas ===
- Lincoln High School (Dallas)
- Lincoln High School (Palestine, Texas), listed on the NRHP in Anderson County, Texas

=== West Virginia ===
- Lincoln High School (West Virginia), Shinnston, West Virginia
- Lincoln High School (Wheeling, West Virginia) in Wheeling, West Virginia
- Lincoln School in Hinton, West Virginia

=== Washington ===
- Lincoln High School (Tacoma, Washington)
- Lincoln High School (Seattle, Washington)

=== Wisconsin ===
- Lincoln High School (Alma Center, Wisconsin), see Dairyland Conference
- Lincoln High School (Manitowoc, Wisconsin)
- Lincoln High School (Milwaukee, Wisconsin)
- Lincoln High School (Wisconsin Rapids, Wisconsin)

== See also ==
- Lincoln School (disambiguation)
- Lincoln County High School (disambiguation)
- Lincoln Park High School (disambiguation)
- Abraham Lincoln High School (disambiguation)
