= West End, Davenport, Iowa =

Area of city of Davenport, Iowa, USA

West End
- District
- Interactive map of West End
- Coordinates: 41°32′35″N 90°35′27″W
- Country: USA
- State: Iowa
- County: Scott County
- City: Davenport, Iowa
- Time zone: UTC−06:00 (CST)
  - Summer (DST): UTC−05:00 (CDT)

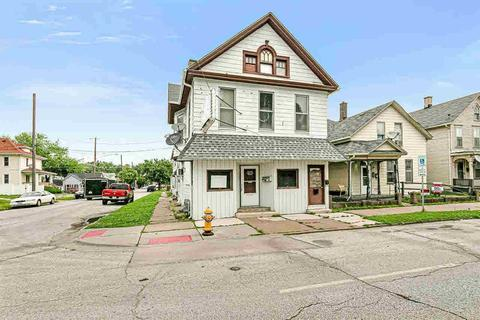
A house in the area.

The West End is an area of the city of Davenport, Iowa and is bordered by both W. 9th street, W. 8th Street, N. Marquette Street, the Mississippi River, and I-280. Its main streets are Rockingham Road, Telegraph Road, N. Division Street, and N. Marquette St. The area is also known to be "West Davenport".

== History ==
The West End and its history traces back with the War of 1812 in which the Sauks were fighting the British on what would be known as Credit Island. On September 4–5, 1814, another Credit Island battle occurred with Major Zachary Taylor as the commander of the U.S. and the Sauks' commander being Black Hawk. In the end, only one person was killed, marking the location as a historic site for visitors.

In 1832, Chief Keokuk signed a treaty to end the Black Hawk War along with General Winfield Scott while Antoine LeClaire, a Native himself with French descent, served as translator. When Davenport was established in 1836 by Antoine LeClaire and named after his good friend Colonel George Davenport, the West End was also established.

In 1836, the areas bordered today by W. 9th street, W. 8th Street, N. Marquette Street, the Mississippi River, and I-280, were laid out as the Rockingham Township, simply known as Rockingham. For over a century, Rockingham was a rival city to its eastern neighbor, Davenport.

In 1890, the state's very first crematory opened in the nearby cemetery by Tri-City, designed by architect Fritz Clausen, who designed it in a style called "Richardsonian Romanesque". Clausen is Davenport's single most important architect in its history. The first cremation at the place was truly a dead large sheep.

Throughout the late 1800s and early 1900s, murders and suicides occurred. One such case was a woman by the name of Maggie Durley who was murdered by her husband, a man named William Durley. Durley dumped his wife's body onto the area's rural parts and confessed it was punishment for her. Another case involved a couple who committed suicide by jumping into the Mississippi river over at Credit Island.

By the 1930s, the notorious period known as the "Great Depression" began to affect the West End, with severe sickness, hunger, and unsanitary living conditions plaguing the area. Eventually, through the county and municipal government, the federal Civil Works Administration employed thousands of men. More than 200 jobs were created by the construction of Lock and Dam 15 project in 1932. Hundreds of state employees worked on completing the Kimberly Road Outerbelt Bypass in 1936.

On January 22, 1958, the old Rockingham Township lost its battle with Davenport to try to become seat of the Scott County and ultimately became part of Davenport.

At some point in 1970, Keota Avenue, below Rockingham, was flooded.

== Demographics ==
The West End's demographics are mostly White with a smaller percentage of African Americans and a fair amount of those who are of Hispanic or Latino descent. The area is known within Davenport as having the highest amount of those who live below the poverty line. Residents of the West End neighborhood have been under-educated since the Great Depression; the highest education level most commonly received is an associate's degree.

== Education ==
The area consists of two elementary schools, Hayes and Monroe and one intermediate school, Franklin L. Smart Intermediate School, which are part of the Davenport Community School District. The former Rockingham Elementary school opened as a K-6 school in 1926 and closed in 1940. Rockingham Elementary then became Roosevelt Elementary School and reopened in the 1945-1946 school year as a K-3 school. The school closed at the end of the 1997-1998 school year and became the Roosevelt Community Center.

== Landmarks ==
The historic places include Credit Island, Tri-City Jewish Cemetery, the Putnam Museum, and the House at 2123 W. Second Street.

== Former places ==
In 1902, a circus by the name of the "Harris Nickel Plate Show" was performed near Rockingham and South Howell Street. The area is now a manufacturing company.

== See also ==
- Rockingham Township, Iowa
- Credit Island
