= ALHS =

ALHS may refer to:

- Abraham Lincoln High School (disambiguation)
- Avon Lake High School
