= Lincoln Academy =

Lincoln Academy may refer to:

== Schools ==
- Lincoln Academy (Maine) (est. 1801), a private boarding and day school in Newcastle, Maine, US
- Lincoln Academy (Kings Mountain, North Carolina) (1886–1955), a former public elementary and secondary school (with boarding students) for African American students, US
- Old Lincoln High School (1869–1969), a former public secondary school for African American students in Tallahassee, Florida, US
- The Priory City of Lincoln Academy (est. 1896), a state-funded secondary academy in Lincoln, Lincolnshire, England
- Lincoln Memorial High School (1930–2019), a former public secondary school and later middle school primarily for African Americans in Bradenton, Florida, US
- Academy at Lincoln, a public middle school in Greensboro, North Carolina, US, among the Guilford County Schools

== Other organizations ==
- The Lincoln Academy of Illinois, Springfield, Illinois, US

== See also ==
- Lincoln College (disambiguation)
- Lincoln Institute (disambiguation)
- Lincoln School (disambiguation)
- Lincoln University (disambiguation)
