= Lincoln Middle School =

Lincoln Middle School may refer to:

== Canada ==
- Lincoln Middle School (Winnipeg, Manitoba); see Robert Browning School

== United States ==
- Lincoln Middle School (Alameda, California)
- Lincoln Middle School (Santa Monica, California)
- Lincoln Middle School (Fort Collins, Colorado)
- Lincoln Middle School (Gainesville, Florida)
- Lincoln Middle School (La Salle, Illinois), LaSalle Elementary School District 122
- Lincoln Middle School (Mount Prospect, Illinois), Mount Prospect, Illinois
- Lincoln Middle School (Park Ridge, Illinois)
- Lincoln Middle School (Rockford, Illinois), a public school in Rockford, Illinois
- Lincoln Middle School (Indianapolis, Indiana), Metropolitan School District of Pike Township
- Lincoln Middle School (Portland, Maine)
- Lincoln Middle School (Dunellen, New Jersey), Dunellen Public Schools
- Lincoln Middle School (El Paso, Texas)
- Lincoln Middle School (Pullman, Washington)
- Lincoln Middle School (Washington, D.C.)
- Lincoln Middle School (Meriden, Connecticut)

== See also ==
- Lincoln School (disambiguation)
- Lincoln Elementary School (disambiguation)
- Lincoln High School (disambiguation)
