= Kimball High School (Kimball, West Virginia) =

School in Kimball, West Virginia, United States

Coordinates: 37.4254°N 81.5034°W

Kimball High School, also known as Kimball Negro High School, was in Kimball, West Virginia in McDowell County, West Virginia. It was part of the Browns Creek School District. The school became a junior high school as students were integrated into Welch High School. The school's basketball team was known as the "Terrors".

== History ==
In 1925, its basketball team lost in the championship game to Lincoln High School of Wheeling, West Virginia. The tournament was the first for basketball teams from African American high schools held in the state. The school also had a cheerleading squad.

Photographs of the basketball team and of "Students and Teachers in a Kimball Negro High School Classroom, McDowell County" were taken in 1950. The football team won the WVAU state football championship in 1952.

Kimball High School was converted into a junior high school in 1966.
