= Lincoln University =

Lincoln University or University of Lincoln may refer to:

== United States ==
=== California ===
- Abraham Lincoln University, a law school in Los Angeles
- Claremont Lincoln University, an accredited online graduate university in Claremont
- Lincoln University (California), a private university in Oakland

=== Illinois ===
- Lincoln Christian University (1944–2024), a private university based in Lincoln
- Lincoln College (Illinois) (1865–2022), a private, independent liberal arts college located in Lincoln

=== Other states ===
- Juarez–Lincoln University, a former university (1971–1991) based in Fort Worth and Austin, Texas
- Lincoln Memorial University, a private liberal arts college in Harrogate, Tennessee
- Lincoln University (Missouri), a public historically black public university in Jefferson City, Missouri
- Lincoln University (Pennsylvania), a public historically black university in Chester County, Pennsylvania
  - Lincoln University (CDP), Pennsylvania, a census-designated place in Lower Oxford Township, Chester County
- University of Nebraska–Lincoln, a public research university in Lincoln, Nebraska

== Other countries ==
- Lincoln College (University of Adelaide), a religious residential college in North Adelaide, South Australia
- Lincoln University College, Malaysia, a private university in Petaling Jaya, Selangor
- Lincoln University (New Zealand), a public university in Lincoln, Canterbury Region, South Island
- University of Lincoln, a public research university in Lincoln, England
- Lincoln Bishop University, the other university in Lincoln, England

== See also ==
- Lincoln Academy (disambiguation)
- Lincoln College (disambiguation)
- Lincoln Institute (disambiguation)
- Lincoln Law School (disambiguation)
- Lincoln School (disambiguation)
- Morrill Land-Grant Colleges Act; schools created this way are sometimes called Lincoln Universities, since Lincoln signed the first Morrill Act
