= Henry Lawrence (American football) =

American football player (born 1951)

No. 70
- Position: Offensive tackle

Personal information
- Born: September 26, 1951 (age 75); Danville, Pennsylvania, U.S.
- Listed height: 6 ft 4 in (1.93 m)
- Listed weight: 272 lb (123 kg)

Career information
- High school: Lincoln Memorial (Palmetto, Florida)
- College: Florida A&M (1970–1973)
- NFL draft: 1974: 1st round, 19th overall pick

Career history
- Oakland / Los Angeles Raiders (1974–1986)

Awards and highlights
- 3× Super Bowl champion (XI, XV, XVIII); 2× Pro Bowl (1983, 1984); Second-team All-American (1973); First-team Little All-American (1973)

Career NFL statistics
- Games played: 187
- Games started: 148
- Fumble recoveries: 9
- Stats at Pro Football Reference

Henry Lawrence (born September 26, 1951) is an American former professional football player who was an offensive tackle for 13 seasons with the Oakland / Los Angeles Raiders of the National Football League (NFL). He played college football for the Florida A&M Rattlers. Twice selected to the Pro Bowl, he won three Super Bowls with the Raiders.

== Biography ==
Lawrence played in Super Bowl XI and was a starter in Super Bowl XV and Super Bowl XVIII for the Raiders earning three Super Bowl Championship Rings. Lawrence is a member of Alpha Phi Alpha fraternity. At the 2010 Alpha Phi Alpha Convention, Henry was the recipient of the Jesse Owens Achievement Award for his athletic excellence.

Lawrence features in the documentary film Through the Tunnel about Lincoln Memorial High School in Palmetto, Florida. He and his coach, Eddie Shannon, made the transition to Manatee High School in the wake of desegregation.

Lawrence contributed lead vocals to two songs (Lo Down and Stagger Lee) on the 2025 CD (recorded in 2003) posthumous release of music by Rock and Roll Hall Of Fame pianist Johnnie Johnson. The collection includes other guest artists.

Lawrence has five children: Ishmael Lawrence, Isaac Lawrence, Juliet Lawrence, Itanza Lawrence and Portia Whitaker.
