= Gilruth Schoolhouse =

- Formerly listed on the U.S. National Register of Historic Places
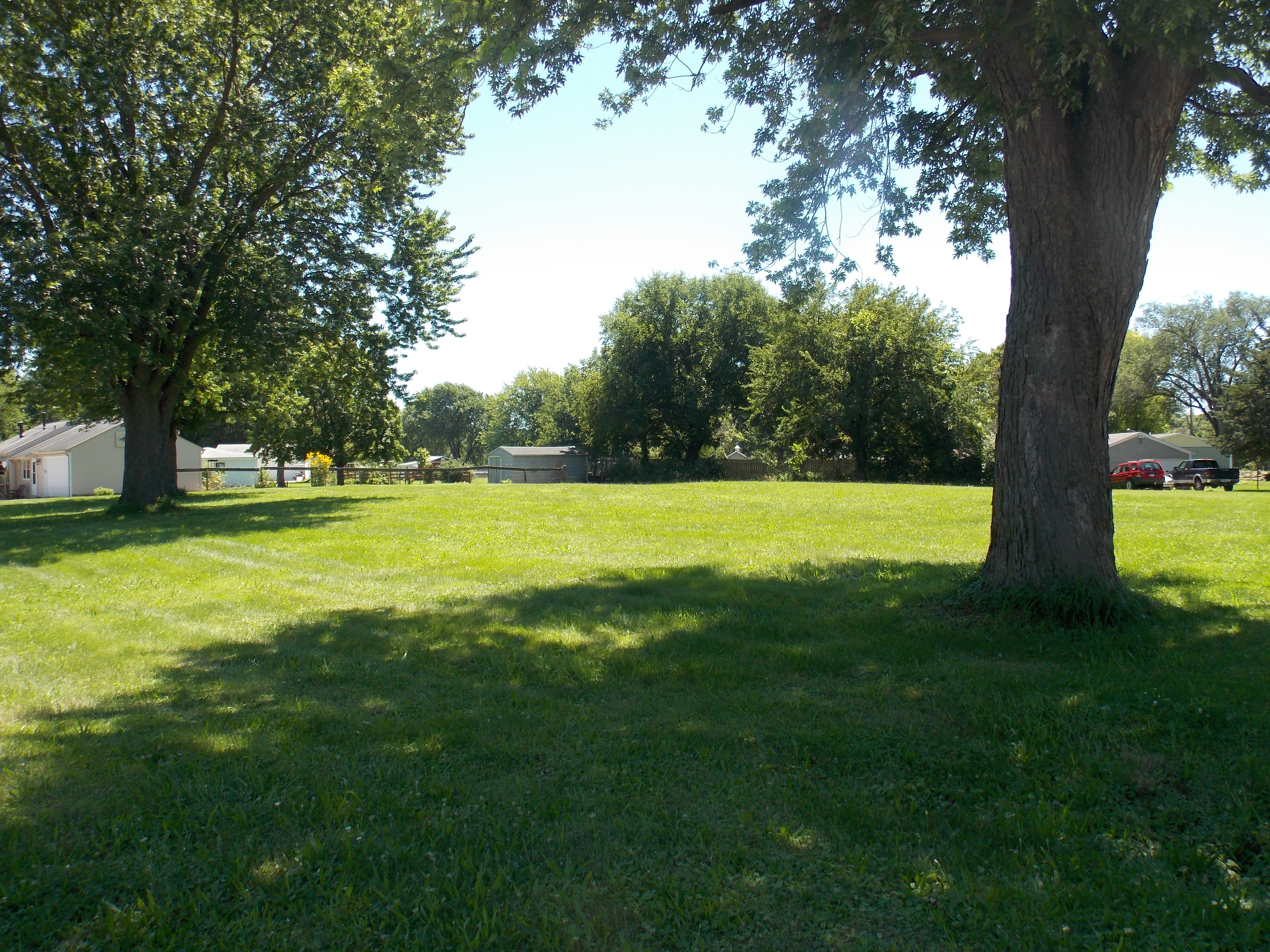
- The lot where the schoolhouse was located
- Location: 53rd and Marquette Sts., Davenport, Iowa
- Built: 1871
- NRHP reference No.: 77000555

Significant dates
- Added to NRHP: September 16, 1977
- Removed from NRHP: May 12, 2009

The Gilruth Schoolhouse was a historic building located in Davenport, Iowa, United States. The one-room school was built in 1871 by the Rev. James Gilruth, who was a Methodist minister, wrestler, and axe thrower. The school was started as a subscription school to educate Gilruth's children, grandchildren, and neighbors. This was a common type of school in Iowa before education was publicly funded. In such a system, parents generally organized and financially supported the school, hired the teacher, and devised the curriculum.

In the school's early years, the boys and girls sat on opposite sides of the school. One punishment for bad behavior was to have an offending student sit on the other side of the building. Eventually, the Gilruth school was absorbed into the Davenport Community School District as District #4. The school closed in 1960, and the property was bought nine years later by the families of Roger Jepsen, John Platt, and T.H. Deevers for historical preservation. The Kimberly Village Christian Reformed Church renovated the building in 1971 for use as a preschool. The property was listed on the National Register of Historic Places in 1977. In 1991, the school building was torn down when its owner could not find a buyer; it was delisted from the National Register in 2009.
