= Houston Coal Company Store =

- U.S. National Register of Historic Places
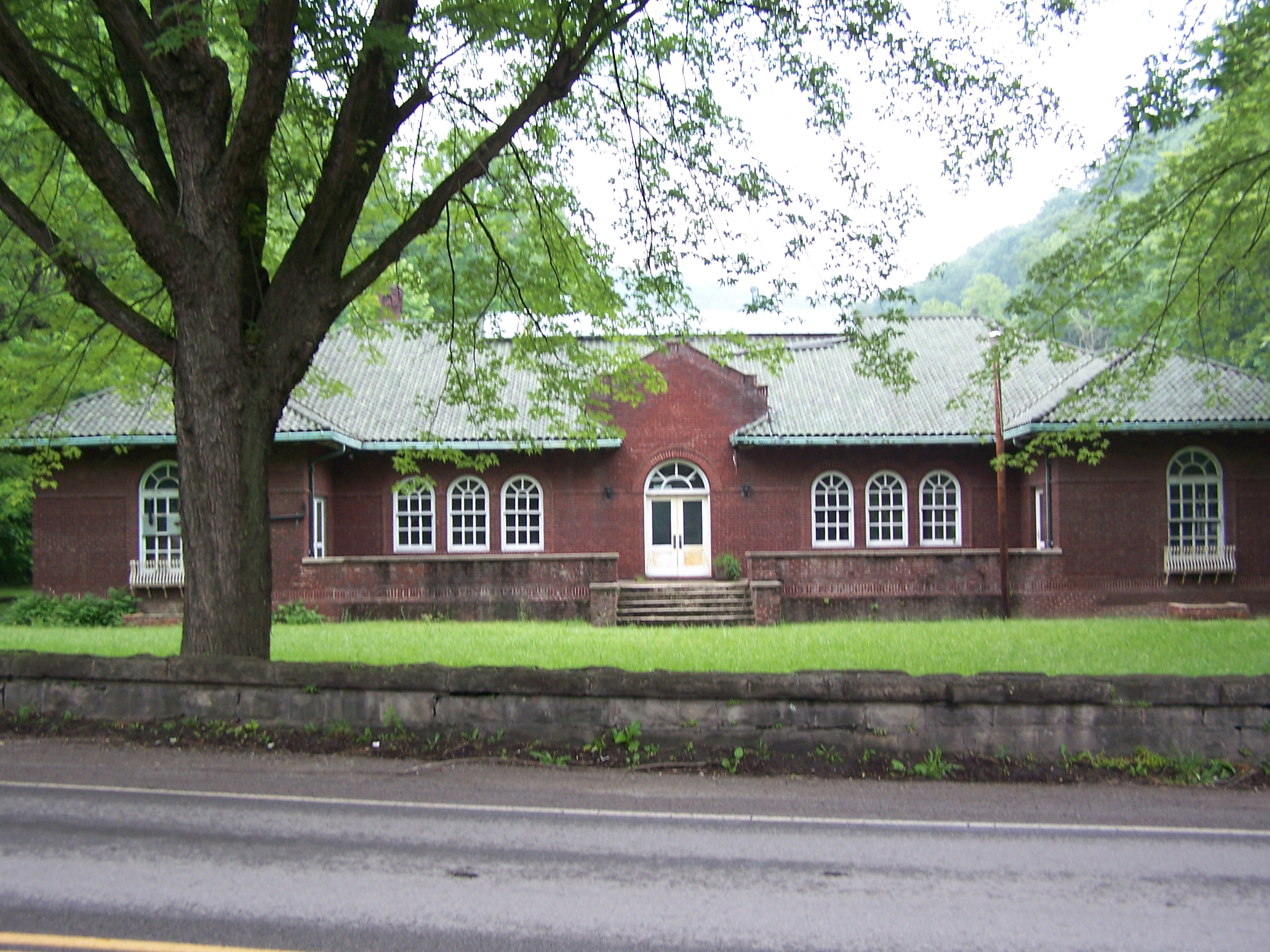

- Location within West Virginia Location within the United States
- Location: US 52, Kimball, West Virginia
- Coordinates: 37°25′48″N 81°30′32″W
- Architectural style: Late 19th And 20th Century Revivals, Italian Renaissance
- MPS: Coal Company Stores in McDowell County MPS
- NRHP reference No.: 92000331
- Added to NRHP: April 17, 1992

The Houston Coal Company Store, also known as the Koppers Store, is an intact example of a coal company store, located at Carswell, West Virginia. The 1923 Italian Renaissance building possesses a detailed brick exterior and a clay tile roof, with skylights at the roof's peak. The store served a small mining community of Carswell, West Virginia, first for the Houston Coal Company and later for the Koppers Coal Company. Another store, now disappeared, served the upper end of the long hollow. The store is surrounded by an expansive lawn, bordered by a stream.
