= Terror of the Tug =

- Written by: Jean Battlo
- Genre: Historical drama

Premiere
- Date: 2000
- Place: McDowell County, West Virginia

Terror of the Tug is a play written by Jean Battlo and based on events in the life of Police Chief Sid Hatfield just after the Matewan Massacre, a notable event in the history of West Virginia and its Pocahontas Coalfield, and the history of mining labor relations in the United States.

The events in the play Terror of the Tug took place after the historical events of the Coal Wars battle, depicted in the 1987 movie Matewan.

The Tug of the title is the Tug Fork of the Big Sandy River that flows through the coal-mining region of West Virginia and Kentucky.
