= Furio Nordio =

Italian bobsledder

Medal record

Bobsleigh

World Championships
Gold medal – first place	1960 Cortina d'Ampezzo	Four-man
Gold medal – first place	1961 Lake Placid	Four-man

Furio Nordio was an Italian bobsledder who competed in the early 1960s. He won two gold medals in the four-man event at the FIBT World Championships (1960, 1961).
