= Monroe Elementary School (Davenport, Iowa) =

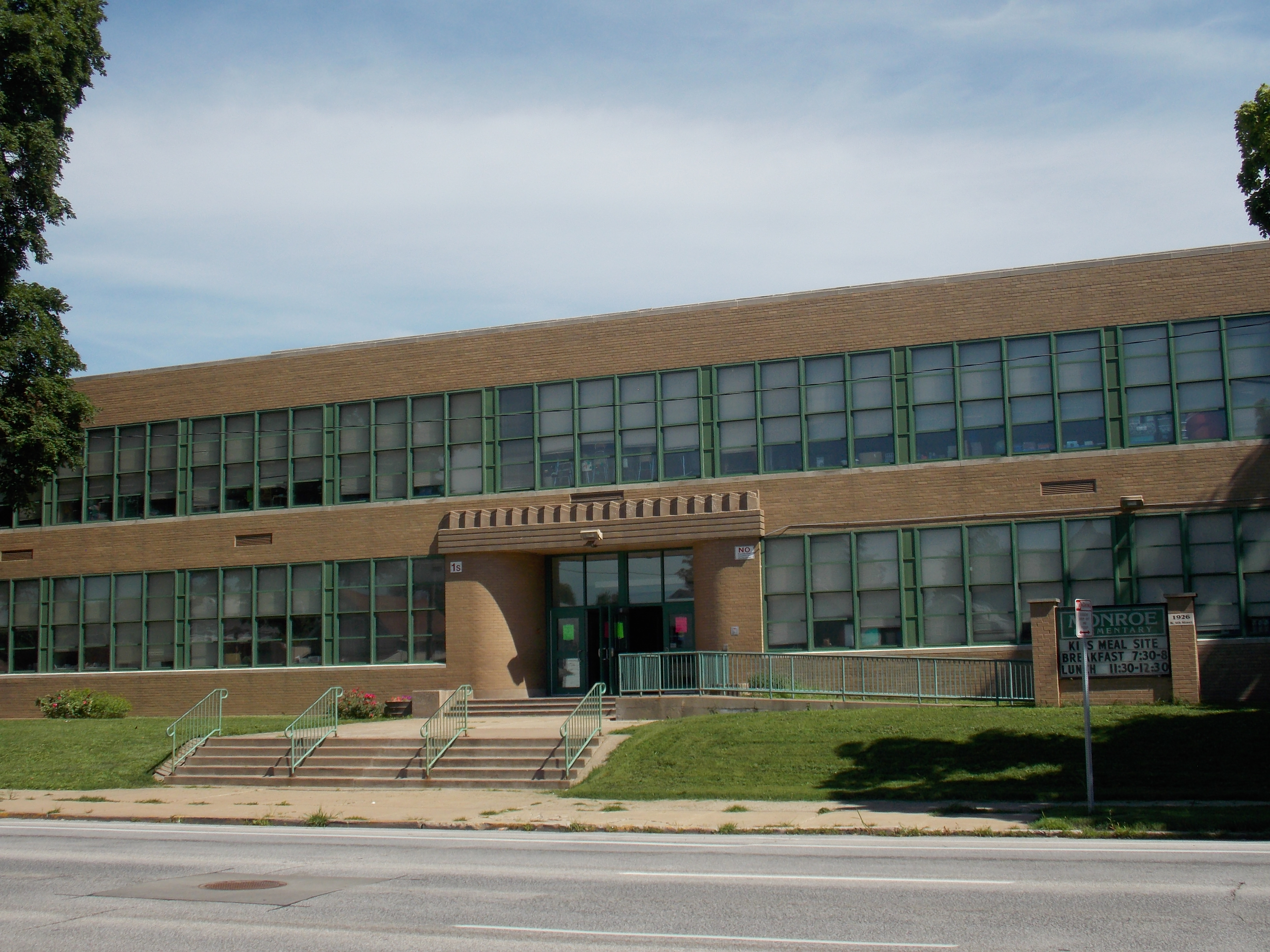
- Location: 1926 West 4th St. Davenport, Iowa

History
- Built: 1940

Site notes
- Area: 3.7 acres (1.5 ha)
- Architect(s): Kruse & Parish; Willis, T.S., General Contractor
- Architectural style: Moderne
- Governing body: Local

Monroe Elementary School is a building in Davenport, Iowa, United States in the West End. It was nominated for on the National Register of Historic Places on September 9, 2002.

== History ==
The Davenport Board of Education did an evaluation of its elementary school facilities in the 1920s as well as a study of the projected growth of the city and where that growth would take place. The projection was for the number of elementary-aged students to rise by almost three thousand students between 1930 and 1950, but no building plan based on these projections was prepared. The elementary school population, however, already rose to that projection by 1936. The board decided at that time to close twelve of its old elementary school buildings and build six new ones. The plan would cost the school district $2.5 million with the federal government contributing 45% of the costs as part of the Public Works Administration. In addition to Monroe, the new elementary schools included Madison, Lincoln, McKinley, Washington, and Jefferson.

The floor plans for all six school buildings were designed by the Chicago architectural firm of Smith & Childs, and they are all similar in layout. Local architects were employed to design the stylistic features for each building. The Davenport architectural firm of Kruse & Parish was chosen for Monroe who designed the exterior in the Moderne style. Of the six school buildings constructed during this period, Monroe is considered "the most impressive in quality of design." Its Moderne elements are found in the bands of windows, corner windows, glass brick, and curved walls. The building was constructed by T.S. Willis. Ground for the new building was broken in 1939 and classes were begun in 1940.

The property was covered in a study of Public Schools for Iowa: Growth and Change MPS Its listing status is DR, which means Date Received/Pending Nomination.

== See also ==
- Davenport Community School District
