= Eric Wennerberg =

Swedish bobsledder

Medal record

Bobsleigh

Representing Sweden

World Championships
Bronze medal – third place	1961 Lake Placid	Four-man

Eric Wennerberg (21 January 1917 in Landskrona – 15 May 2001) was a Swedish bobsledder who competed from the early 1950s to the late 1960s. He won a bronze medal in the four-man event at the 1961 FIBT World Championships in Lake Placid, New York.

He represented Djurgårdens IF. Wennerberg died 15 May 2001 in Segeltorp.
