= Gunnar Garpö =

Swedish bobsledder

Medal record

Men's Bobsleigh

World Championships
Bronze medal – third place	1961 Lake Placid	Four-man

Gunnar Charles Garpö (13 October 1919 – 18 May 1976) was a Swedish bobsledder who competed from the early 1950s to the early 1960s. He won a bronze medal in the four-man event at the 1961 FIBT World Championships in Lake Placid, New York.

Garpö also finished seventh in the four-man event at the 1952 Winter Olympics in Oslo.
