= Lincoln Elementary School =

Lincoln Elementary School is a common name for elementary schools in the U.S. It may refer specifically to:

- Lincoln Elementary School (Newark, California), part of the Newark Unified School District
- Lincoln Elementary School (Oakland, California)
- Abraham Lincoln Elementary School (Pomona, California)
- Lincoln Elementary School (Denver, Colorado), a Denver Landmark
- Abraham Lincoln Elementary School (Chicago), Illinois - See List of Chicago Public Schools
- Lincoln Elementary School (Ottawa, Illinois)
- Lincoln Elementary School (Manchester, Iowa), listed on the NRHP in Iowa
- Lincoln Elementary School (Ottawa, Kansas)
- Abraham Lincoln Elementary, in Medford, Oregon
- The former Woodrow Wilson Junior High School (Eugene, Oregon), which was renamed Lincoln Elementary School several decades before its closure
- Lincoln Elementary School (Pittsburgh, Pennsylvania), listed on the National Register of Historic Places in Pennsylvania
- Lincoln Elementary School (Ellensburg, Washington), part of the Ellensburg School District
- Lincoln Elementary School, part of the Madison Metropolitan School District

== See also ==
- Lincoln School (disambiguation)
- Lincoln Middle School (disambiguation)
