= 1919 Kimball mining disaster =

1919 explosion in West Virginia, USA

Coordinates: 37°25.808′N 81°30.518′W

Kimball mining disaster
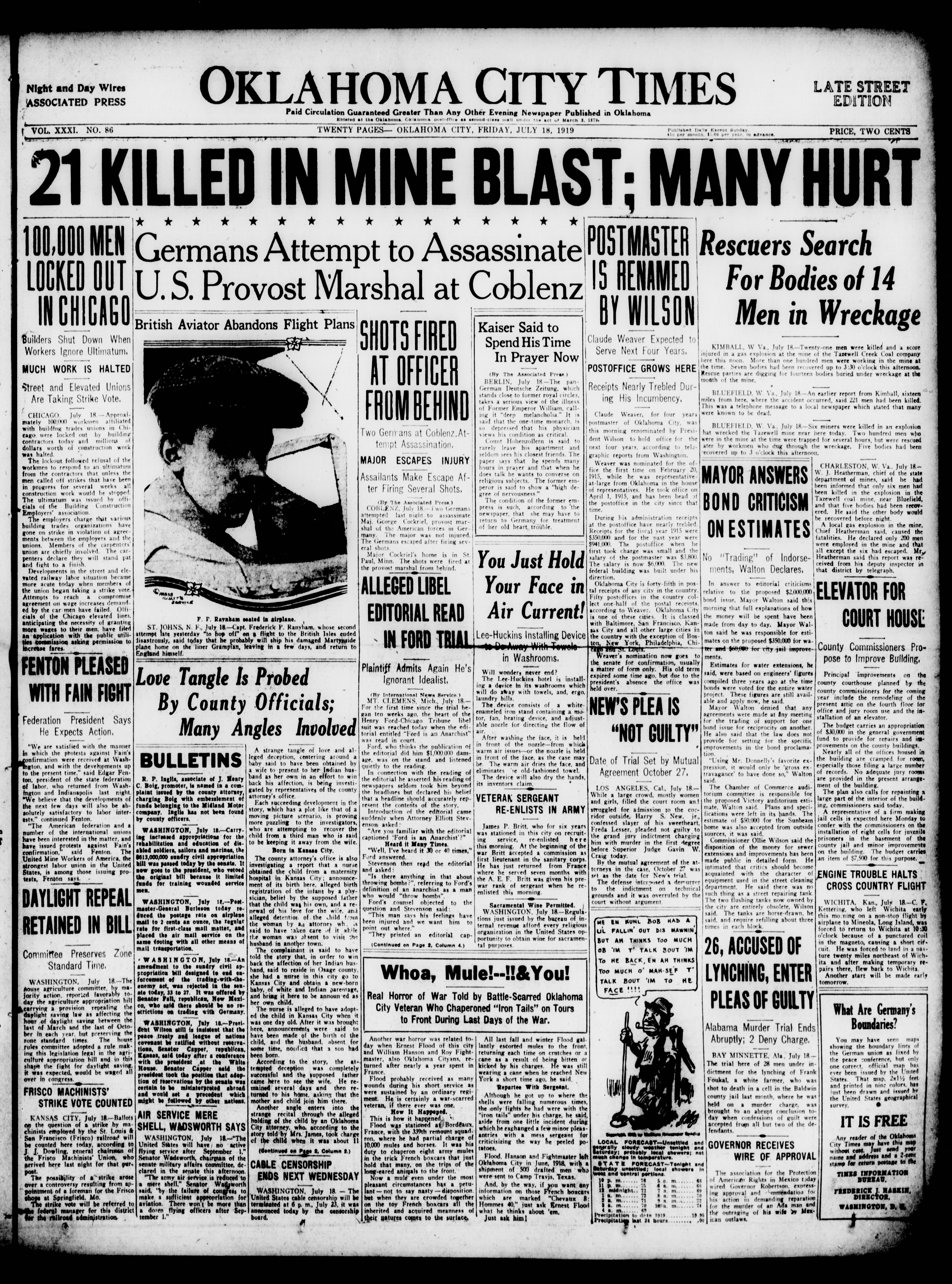
- Front page of the Oklahoma City times July 18, 1919
- Date: July 18, 1919
- Location: Carswell coal mine in Kimball, West Virginia which was owned by the Tazewell Creek Coal company
- Cause: Coal mine explosion
- Deaths: 6

The Kimball mining disaster happened on July 18, 1919, at the Carswell coal mine in Kimball, West Virginia, killing six miners. Initial reports said that 221 men had been killed but they were trapped by the explosion. A rescue party was able to dig through the wreckage, allowing 215 to return alive to the surface.

== Bibliography ==
Notes

References

- Greenberg, Michael I. (2006). Encyclopedia of Terrorist, Natural, and Man-made Disasters. Jones & Bartlett Learning. ISBN 9780763737825. - Total pages: 295
- The Oklahoma City Times (July 18, 1919). "Rescuers Search For bodies of 14 men in Wreckage". The Oklahoma City Times. Oklahoma City. ISSN 2333-0201. OCLC 13764083.
