= Lincoln College =

Lincoln College may refer to:

in Australia

- Lincoln College (University of Adelaide), a residential College of the University of Adelaide

in Malaysia

- Lincoln University College, Malaysia, a private higher education institution formerly known as Lincoln College

in New Zealand

- Lincoln University, New Zealand, formerly called Lincoln College (1961–1990)

in the United Kingdom

- Lincoln College, Oxford, a constituent college of the University of Oxford
- Lincoln College, Lincolnshire, a further education college in Lincolnshire

in the United States

- Lincoln College (Illinois), a private institution with campuses in Lincoln and Normal, Illinois
- Lincoln College of New England, a for-profit associates' college in Southington, Connecticut
- Lincoln Land Community College, Springfield, Illinois
- Lincoln College, former name of Washburn University, Kansas
- Lincoln Technical Institute, also known as Lincoln Tech, and part of the Lincoln Group of Schools
- Lincoln College of Technology, part of the Lincoln Group of Schools

== See also ==
- Lincoln Academy (disambiguation)
- Lincoln Institute (disambiguation)
- Lincoln School (disambiguation)
- Lincoln University (disambiguation)
- University of Lincoln, in the United Kingdom
- Morrill Land-Grant Colleges Act; schools created this way are sometimes called Lincoln Colleges, since Lincoln signed the first Morrill Act
- Lincoln Group of Schools
