= Tri-City Jewish Cemetery (Davenport, Iowa) =

Cemetery

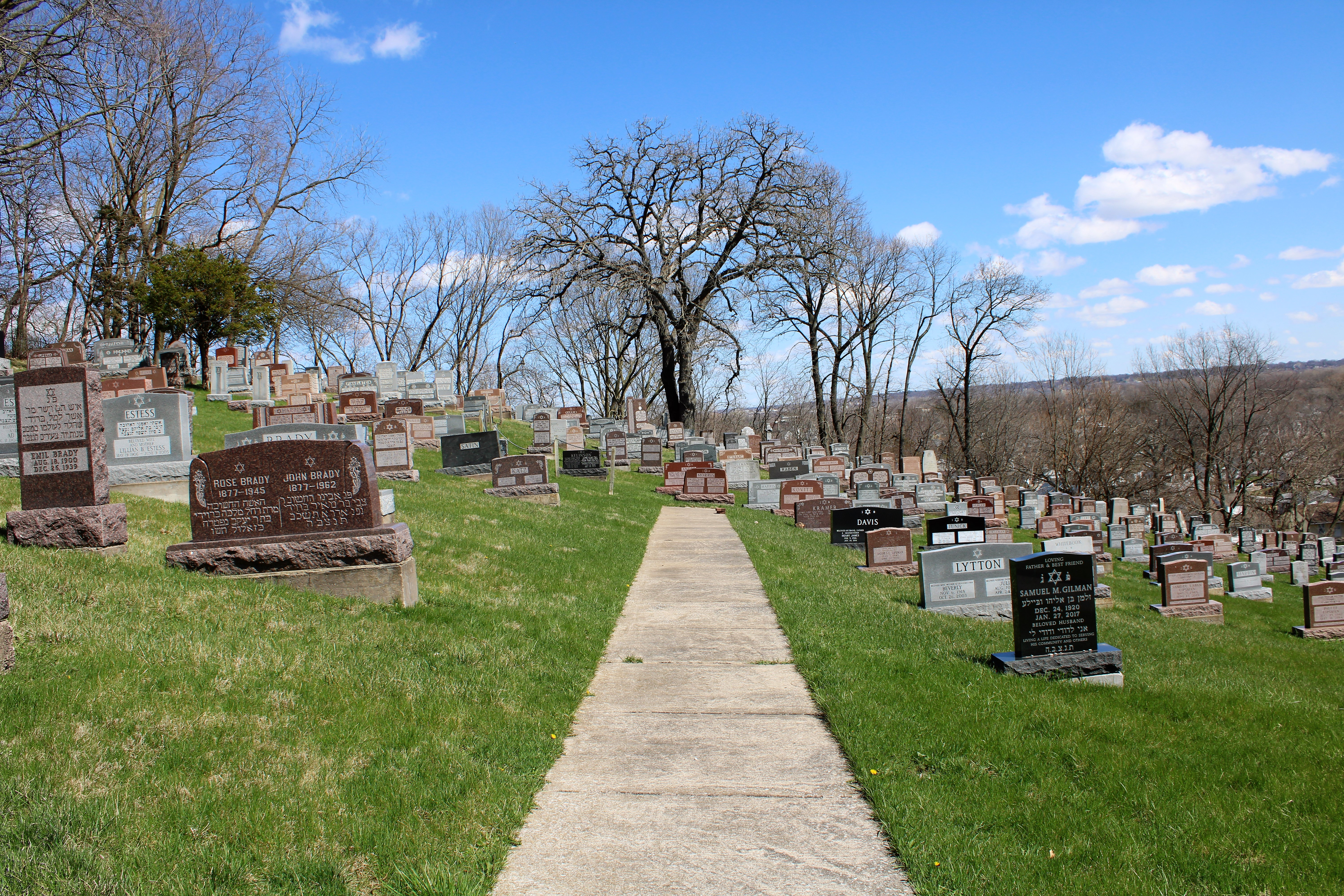
- Interactive map of Tri-City Jewish Cemetery

Details
- Established: 1800s
- Location: 602 S Fairmount St. Davenport, Iowa
- Country: United States
- Coordinates: 41°30′43″N 90°37′52″W
- Type: Jewish
- Owned by: Jewish Federation of the Quad Cities
- Find a Grave: Tri-City Jewish Cemetery

Tri-City Jewish Cemetery, also known as the B'nai Ameth Cemetery, is located above Rockingham Road in the West End of Davenport, Iowa. It is located on a very steep hill. The place has had some problems with littering likely caused by younger citizens with beer cans being left at the landmark.
