= McKinley Elementary School (Davenport, Iowa) =

- U.S. National Register of Historic Places
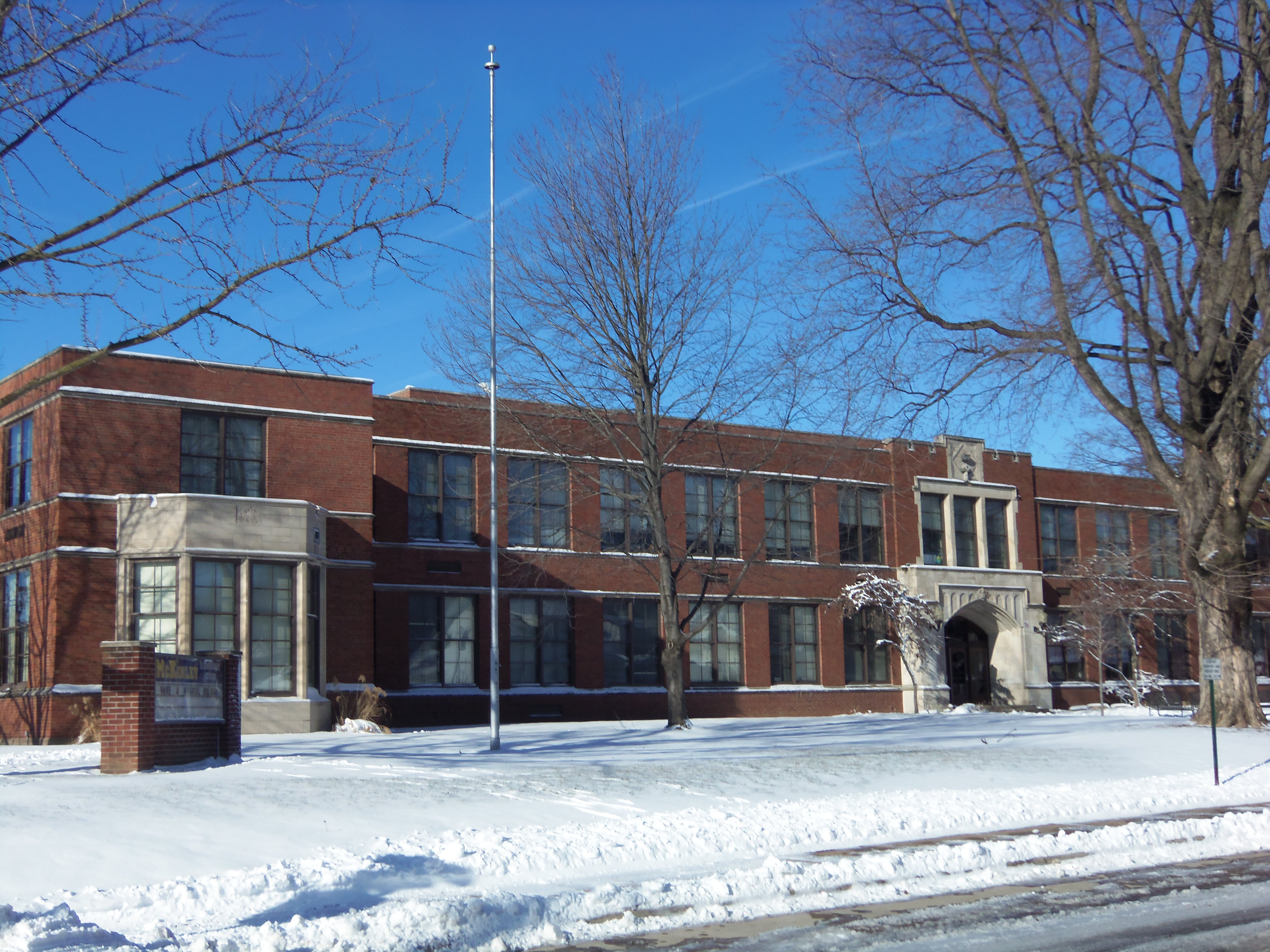

- Location within Iowa Location within the United States
- Location: 1716 Kenwood St. Davenport, Iowa
- Coordinates: 41°31′41″N 90°34′4″W
- Area: 4.13 acres (1.67 ha)
- Built: 1940, 1953
- Architect: Smith & Childs; Kruse & Parish
- Architectural style: Late 19th and 20th Century Revivals; Collegiate Gothic
- MPS: Public Schools for Iowa: Growth and Change MPS
- NRHP reference No.: 02001222
- Added to NRHP: October 24, 2002

McKinley Elementary School is located on the east side of Davenport, Iowa, United States. It was listed on the National Register of Historic Places in 2002.

== History ==
The Davenport Board of Education did an evaluation of its elementary school facilities in the 1920s as well as a study of the projected growth of the city and where that growth would take place. The projection was for the number of elementary-aged students to rise by almost three thousand students between 1930 and 1950, but no building plan based on these projections was prepared. The elementary school population, however, already rose to that projection by 1936. The board decided at that time to close twelve of its old elementary school buildings and build six new ones. The plan would cost the school district $2.5 million with the federal government contributing 45% of the costs as part of the Public Works Administration. In addition to McKinley, the new elementary schools included Monroe, Lincoln, Madison, Washington, and Jefferson.

The floor plans for all six school buildings were designed by the Chicago architectural firm of Smith & Childs, and they are all similar in layout. Local architects were employed to design the stylistic features for each building. The Davenport architectural firm of Kruse & Parish was chosen for McKinley. The building was constructed by Tunnicliff Construction Co. Ground for the new building was broken in 1939 and classes were begun in 1940. Davenport's population continued to increase after World War II and in 1953 second story classrooms were built on the projecting ends of the building and a two-story addition that included classrooms and a cafeteria in the lower level was added to the northwest corner of the building. Two years later Hoover Elementary School was built to the west to elevate congestion at both McKinley and Lincoln. Enrollment continued to climb during the 1960s and started to decline in the 1970s. The decline has continued into the first decade of the 21st-century.

== Architecture ==
McKinley Elementary School is a three-story structure set on a basement composed of steel-reinforced concrete. The exterior is covered in dark red brick that is accented with limestone. A flat roof tops the building. The classrooms at both ends of the building project slightly from the main facade. There is a bay window on the south side. The main entrance into the building is a tripartite door with a Gothic arch transom above. It is capped with heavy decorative stonework that features a carving of a book and beehive above the door. The library windows above the entrance are also surrounded by stone. The roof level features crenellated brick with a stone coping. The windows are organized in groups of two, they have decorative stone lintels and they are connected to a stone belt-course. The 1953 addition was built using the same brick and stone belt-course as the original building.

The library, gymnasium, auditorium, science, art, and vocal music rooms are located in the center of the building. Also in the center of the building is a separate community room for use by local citizens. The classrooms are separated from these common areas. A kindergarten room with its own exterior entrance is located on the south side of the building. The gymnasium, auditorium, and the community room are opposite the main entrance and the school office on the first floor. The library is located above the entrance on the second floor. The science, art, and music rooms are located above the gymnasium, auditorium, and the community room on the third floor. They and their storage rooms are the only rooms on that floor.

== See also ==
- Davenport Community School District
