= Robby Stevenson =

American football player (born 1976)

No. 87
- Position: Punter / Placekicker

Personal information
- Born: February 7, 1976 (age 50); Bradenton, Florida, U.S.
- Listed height: 6 ft 2 in (1.88 m)
- Listed weight: 173 lb (78 kg)

Career information
- High school: Manatee
- College: Florida (1995–1997)

Awards and highlights
- SEC Championship (1995, 1996); Bowl Alliance National Championship (1996)

Robert Louis Stevenson (born February 7, 1976) is an American former college football player who was a punter and placekicker for the Florida Gators football team of the University of Florida.

== Early life ==
Stevenson was born in Bradenton, Florida, and grew up playing soccer. Ironically, Stevenson wanted to play quarterback, but the Manatee High School Hurricanes needed a kicker more, and as a lifetime soccer player, he filled the need. Stevenson played for the Hurricanes football team from 1992 to 1994. The Hurricanes won the Florida Class 5A state football championship in 1992, in which Stevenson kicked a 47-yard field goal, and returned to the state final again in 1993. As a junior, he kicked a school record 52-yard field goal. As a senior in 1994, he averaged 45.4 yards per punt and had 75 percent of his kickoffs result in touchbacks.

He was recognized by USA Today as a high school All-American and the nation's top punter. In addition, he was named to the Florida Super Seniors Team and played in the Georgia vs. Florida High School All-Star Game. He was named the nation's best combination kicker and punter by National Recruiting Advisor. In 1995, the Tom Lemming Prep Football Report named Stevenson as the nation's best kicker.

== College career ==
Stevenson accepted an athletic scholarship to attend the University of Florida in Gainesville, Florida, where he played for coach Steve Spurrier's Florida Gators football team from 1995 to 1997. He earned the starting punter position as a true freshman in 1995, and served as the Gators' primary punter through the end of his junior season in 1997.

Prior to the 1998 season, Stevenson was diagnosed with Graves' disease. Although he initially hoped to take a medical redshirt in 1998 and return the following year, the diagnosis effectively ended his football career.

Stevenson was criticized by some commentators for his inconsistency, as evidenced by delivering short kicks in lopsided victories but long punts in pressure situations when they mattered most. His longest punt was sixty-four yards against the Vanderbilt Commodores in 1996. Stevenson posted a career average of 40.7 yards per punt during his three-year tenure as the Gators starting punter, which ranks seventh on the Gators' all-time list—one place ahead of his Gators head coach, Steve Spurrier.

Stevenson's best season average was 42.1 yards per punt in 1996, when Florida won the Southeastern Conference (SEC) title with an undefeated 8–0 conference season, and defeated the top-ranked Florida State Seminoles in the Sugar Bowl to win the consensus national championship. During the 1997 season, he handled both the punting and kickoff duties for the Gators with twenty-one of seventy-one kickoffs resulting in touchbacks.

== Life after football ==
Stevenson graduated from the University of Florida with a bachelor's degree in health and human performance in 2001. He and his wife Holly live in Palmetto, Florida, and they have three daughters.

== See also ==
- Florida Gators football
- List of University of Florida alumni
