= David Braine (athletic director) =

American college athletics administrator

Biographical details
- Born: July 7, 1943 (age 83); Grove City, Pennsylvania, U.S.

Playing career
- 1962–1964: University of North Carolina
- Positions: Defensive back and placekicker

Coaching career (HC unless noted)
- 1976-1977: Assistant Coach, Virginia
- 1974-1975: Assistant Coach, Georgia Tech
- 1971-1973: Assistant Coach, Richmond
- 1967-1970: Assistant Coach, Virginia Military Institute
- 1966-1967: Coach, Manatee High School, Florida

Administrative career (AD unless noted)
- 1997-2006: AD, Georgia Tech
- 1988-1997: AD, Virginia Tech
- 1985-1987: AD, Marshall
- 1983-1984: Assistant AD, Fresno State
- 1978-1983: Assistant AD, Virginia

David Braine (born July 7, 1943) is an American former college football coach who held the position of athletic director at Virginia Tech from 1988 to 1997 and Georgia Tech from 1997 to 2006.

== Early life and education ==
Braine is a native of Grove City, Pennsylvania. He earned a Master's of Arts and Teaching in 1966 from the University of North Carolina. Braine played football for Tar Heels during the 1962–1964 seasons as a placekicker and defensive back.

== Career ==
Braine's administrative career began with two years as the athletic director at Marshall University and assistant positions at Fresno State and Virginia. Braine had previously spent two years at Georgia Tech as an assistant football coach under Pepper Rodgers, and he also coached at Virginia, Richmond and Virginia Military Institute.

=== Virginia Tech ===
During Braine's tenure at Virginia Tech, the school won an NIT Championship in basketball and nine Atlantic 10 Conference titles in other sports. Braine also oversaw improvement in Virginia Tech's athletics facilities.

Braine helped rebuild Virginia Tech football program by securing ties with the Big East Conference and by supporting Virginia Tech's football coach Frank Beamer, following a 2-8-1 football season in 1992. David Braine played a key role in making the Hokies' members of the Atlantic Coast Conference. He was enshrined in the Virginia Tech Sports Hall of Fame for his contributions in Blacksburg.

=== Georgia Tech ===
Braine became athletic director at Georgia Tech on June 3, 1997. Athletic highlights during Braine's tenure at Georgia Tech include the men's basketball team's 2004 NCAA runner-up finish and a school-record streak of nine straight bowl games for the football program. Other athletics highlights during Braine's tenure at Georgia Tech include No. 1 national rankings in baseball and golf and 12 ACC team titles in seven different sports.

Facility upgrades completed during Braine's tenure at Georgia Tech include the $75 million renovation and expansion of Bobby Dodd Stadium at Historic Grant Field, the reconstruction of Russ Chandler Baseball Stadium and the new Georgia Tech Aquatic Center, which hosted the 2006 NCAA Swimming Championships.

During Braine's tenure, the Homer Rice Center for Sports Performance was created. Also during Braine's tenure, Georgia Tech was named the recipient of the first-ever Atlantic Coast Conference Sportsmanship School of the Year Award in 2004.

Braine retired in 2006 due to health concerns after he was diagnosed with Crohn's disease.
