= Davenport Mid City High School =

Public secondary school in Davenport, Iowa, United States

Coordinates: 41.5752°N 90.5809°W

Location
- 3801 Marquette St. Davenport, Iowa 52806; United States

Information
- Type: Public
- Established: 2014
- School district: Davenport Community School District
- Superintendent: TJ Schneckloth
- Principal: Jenni Weipert
- Teaching staff: 20.52 (FTE)
- Grades: 9-12
- Enrollment: 306 (2025-2026)
- Student to teacher ratio: 14.91
- Colors: Purple and White
- Mascot: Maverick
- Website: www.davenportschools.org/midcity/

Davenport Mid City High School is a public alternative high school located in north central Davenport, Iowa. Mid City High School was established in 2014 in the building that was formerly a medical facility. It replaced the previous alternative school in the district, which was called the Kimberly Center.

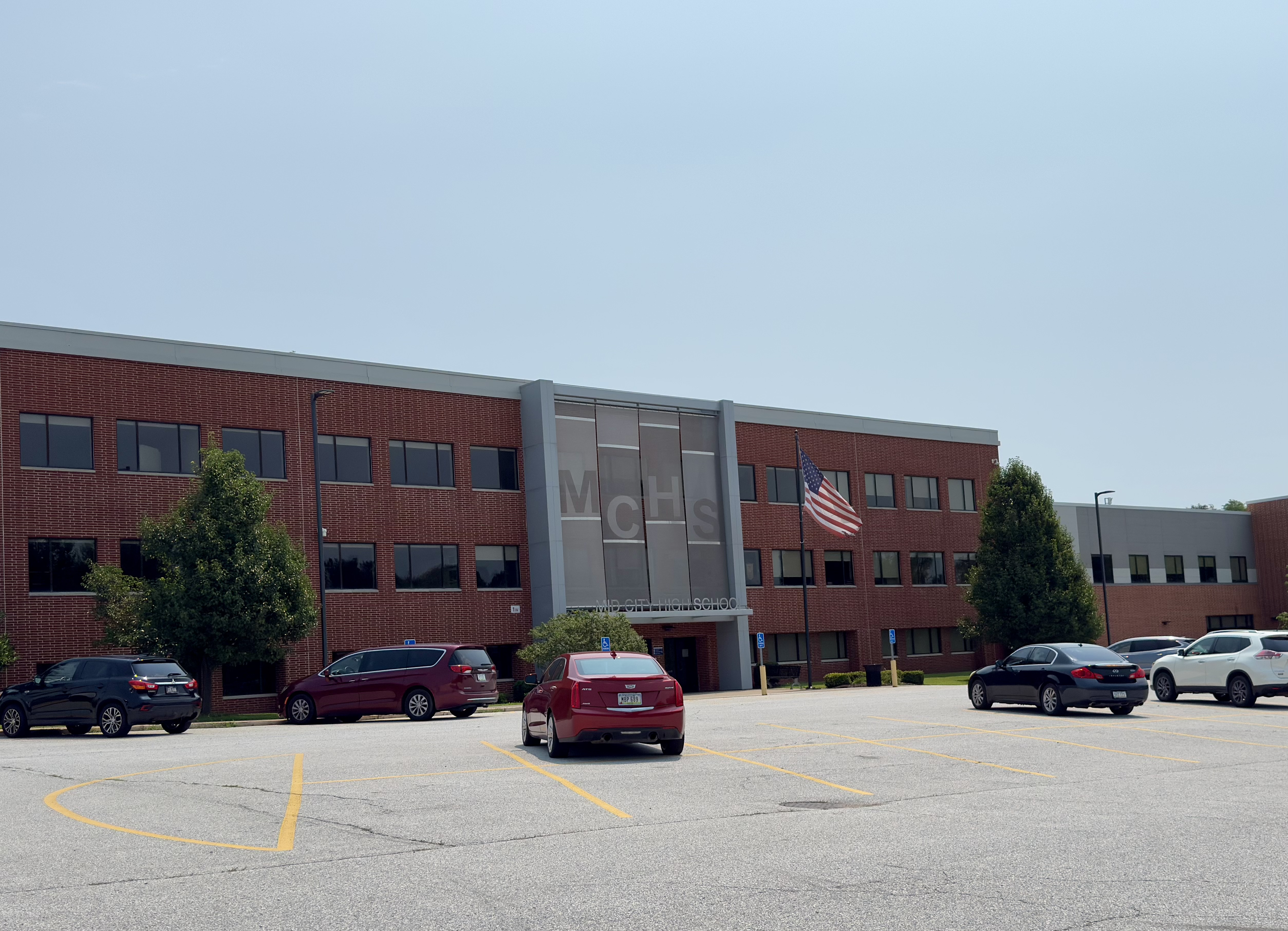
Mid City High School

The purpose of the alternative high school is to decrease the school district's dropout rate. Many of the students enrolled here had problems in their previous schools. Classroom configurations include both traditional settings and collaborative learning settings that are more appropriate for team and project-based learning. The schools mascot, Mavericks, was chosen to reflect a student body that is "unorthodox, independent-minded and individualist, nonconformist, free speech, original or eccentric."

The school is housed in a building that originally housed a medical-office complex at the former Davenport Osteopathic Hospital. In addition to the original building that is 37,355 square feet (3,500 m^{2}), the district added a physical activity center at 14,300 square feet (1,300 m^{2}) and it contains a multipurpose stage, a junior high-sized basketball/sports court, locker rooms, bathrooms, and two classrooms.

== See also ==
- List of high schools in Iowa
