= Kimball, West Virginia =

- Town
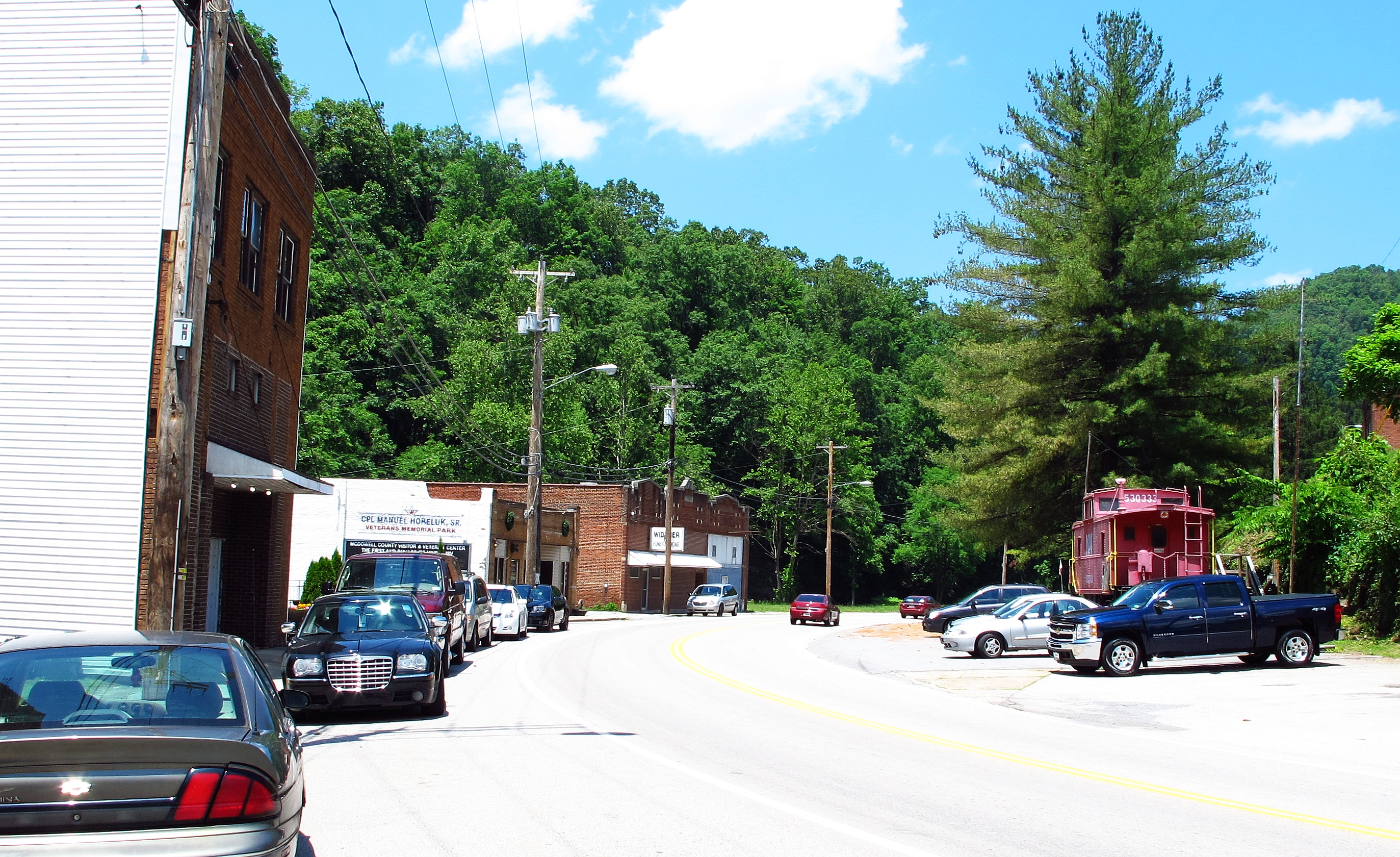
- Kimball in 2014

- Logo

- Location of Kimball in McDowell County, West Virginia.
- Coordinates: 37°25′39″N 81°30′24″W
- Country: United States
- State: West Virginia
- County: McDowell
- Established: 1911

Government
  - Mayor: Adam Gianato

Area
  - Total: 0.25 sq mi (0.66 km^{2})
  - Land: 0.25 sq mi (0.66 km^{2})
  - Water: 0 sq mi (0.00 km^{2})
- Elevation: 1,510 ft (460 m)

Population (2020)
  - Total: 145
  - Density: 570/sq mi (220/km^{2})
- Time zone: UTC-5 (Eastern (EST))
  - Summer (DST): UTC-4 (EDT)
- ZIP code: 24853
- Area code: 304
- FIPS code: 54-43780
- GNIS feature ID: 1541195
- Website: https://kimball.wv.gov/Pages/default.aspx

Kimball is a town in McDowell County, West Virginia, United States. Per the 2020 census, the population was 145. Kimball was incorporated in 1911 and named for Frederick J. Kimball, a railroad official. Kimball is the site of the first war memorial building erected in memory of the African-American veterans of World War I. As of 2024, the town still has a municipal government, where the mayor also acts as the town's only police officer.

== History ==
The Kimball mining disaster took place on July 18, 1919, at the Carswell coal mine in Kimball, killing six miners. Initial reports said that 221 men had been killed, but they were trapped by the explosion. A rescue party was able to dig through the wreckage, allowing 215 to return alive to the surface.

== Geography ==
According to the United States Census Bureau, the town has a total area of 0.25 square miles (0.65 km^{2}), all land.

The town is on the Norfolk Southern Railway (former Norfolk and Western) network.

== Demographics ==
Historical population
Census	Pop.	Note	%±
1910	1,630		—
1920	1,428		−12.4%
1930	1,467		2.7%
1940	1,580		7.7%
1950	1,359		−14.0%
1960	1,175		−13.5%
1970	962		−18.1%
1980	871		−9.5%
1990	550		−36.9%
2000	411		−25.3%
2010	194		−52.8%
2020	145		−25.3%
U.S. Decennial Census; 2010 2020

=== Racial and ethnic composition ===
Kimball town, West Virginia – Racial and ethnic composition Note: the US Census treats Hispanic/Latino as an ethnic category. This table excludes Latinos from the racial categories and assigns them to a separate category. Hispanics/Latinos may be of any race.
Race / Ethnicity (NH = Non-Hispanic)	Pop 2000	Pop 2010	Pop 2020	% 2000	% 2010	% 2020
White alone (NH)	140	73	50	34.06%	37.63%	34.48%
Black or African American alone (NH)	260	111	78	63.26%	57.22%	53.79%
Native American or Alaska Native alone (NH)	0	0	1	0.00%	0.00%	0.69%
Asian alone (NH)	0	0	0	0.00%	0.00%	0.00%
Native Hawaiian or Pacific Islander alone (NH)	1	0	0	0.24%	0.00%	0.00%
Other race alone (NH)	0	0	2	0.00%	0.00%	1.38%
Mixed race or Multiracial (NH)	10	10	11	2.43%	5.15%	7.59%
Hispanic or Latino (any race)	0	0	3	0.00%	0.00%	2.07%
Total	411	194	145	100.00%	100.00%	100.00%

=== 2010 census ===
As of the census of 2010, there were 194 people, 78 households, and 52 families living in the town. The population density was 776.0 inhabitants per square mile (299.6/km^{2}). There were 133 housing units at an average density of 532.0 per square mile (205.4/km^{2}). The racial makeup of the town was 37.6% White, 57.2% African American, and 5.2% from two or more races.

There were 78 households, of which 33.3% had children under the age of 18 living with them, 32.1% were married couples living together, 26.9% had a female householder with no husband present, 7.7% had a male householder with no wife present, and 33.3% were non-families. 29.5% of all households were made up of individuals, and 12.8% had someone living alone who was 65 years of age or older. The average household size was 2.49 and the average family size was 3.08.

The median age in the town was 43 years. 23.7% of residents were under the age of 18; 10.3% were between the ages of 18 and 24; 18.6% were from 25 to 44; 28.9% were from 45 to 64; and 18.6% were 65 years of age or older. The gender makeup of the town was 45.4% male and 54.6% female.

=== 2000 census ===
At the 2000 census, there were 411 people, 166 households and 107 families living in the town. The population density was 1,578.6 inhabitants per square mile (609.5/km^{2}). There were 233 housing units at an average density of 894.9 per square mile (345.5/km^{2}). The racial makeup of the town was 34.06% White, 63.26% African American, 0.24% Pacific Islander, and 2.43% from two or more races.

There were 166 households, of which 22.3% had children under the age of 18 living with them, 33.1% were married couples living together, 27.1% had a female householder with no husband present, and 35.5% were non-families. 33.7% of all households were made up of individuals, and 20.5% had someone living alone who was 65 years of age or older. The average household size was 2.48 and the average family size was 3.12.

24.1% of the population were under the age of 18, 10.7% from 18 to 24, 18.2% from 25 to 44, 23.4% from 45 to 64, and 23.6% who were 65 years of age or older. The median age was 42 years. For every 100 females, there were 72.7 males. For every 100 females age 18 and over, there were 62.5 males.

The median household income was $17,333, and the median family income was $21,429. Males had a median income of $23,750 versus $21,250 for females. The per capita income for the town was $10,269. About 23.6% of families and 33.2% of the population were below the poverty line, including 48.1% of those under age 18 and 14.4% of those age 65 or over.

== Economy ==
From October 2005 when it opened until its closure in January 28, 2016, a Walmart superstore was the largest employer in the town. Before a Walmart opened on the site, the building was home to a Kmart on the property. opening on March 9, 1995. At the time Kimball was the smallest city in US with a Kmart (although it served shoppers normally from the bigger town of Welch. The store closed in 2003 following a bankruptcy & mass-closures.

Kimball is home to the Five Loaves and Two Fishes food bank, which features a hydropanel water production system which can produce 950 gallons of clean drinking water monthly.

== Education ==
Kimball Negro High School served African American students until it was converted to a junior high school in the wake of integration.

== Arts and culture ==
The Houston Coal Company Store is a one-story building constructed with dark red brick and covered by a hipped green tile roof, surrounded by a shaded yard. Arched windows and projecting wings along the facade introduce stylistic variation to the structure. Across Carswell Hollow Road, the owner's former residence, built with similar materials, incorporates Tudor-style influences. Both buildings were designed by a Cincinnati architect, reflecting a cohesive architectural approach.

== Media ==
The town was once served three times weekly by the now defunct Welch News out of the nearby county seat, Welch.

== Notable people ==
- Jean Battlo (1939-2024) - West Virginia playwright, born and raised in Kimball
- Tracy Gravely (born 1968) - former Canadian Football League linebacker
- Jerry Tennant (1938-2024) - American bobsledder competing in the 1961 FIBT World Championships, born in Kimball

== See also ==
- List of U.S. communities with African-American majority populations in 2020
