= Börje-Bengt Hedblom =

Swedish bobsledder

Medal record

Bobsleigh

World Championships
Bronze medal – third place	1961 Lake Placid	Four-man

Börje-Bengt Hedblom was a Swedish bobsledder who competed from the early 1950s to the early 1960s. He won a bronze medal in the four-man event at the 1961 FIBT World Championships in Lake Placid, New York.
