= Jerry Tennant =

American bobsledder (1938–2024)

Medal record

Bobsleigh

World Championships
Silver medal – second place	1961 Lake Placid	Two-man
Silver medal – second place	1961 Lake Placid	Four-man

Jerry Randolph Tennant (March 29, 1938 – April 21, 2024) was an American bobsledder who competed in the early 1960s in Italy, Germany, Switzerland, and the United States. He won two silver medals at the 1961 FIBT World Championships in Lake Placid, New York, both in the two-man and four-man events. Tennant, and driver Gary Sheffield, also held the two-man world record course time before Eugenio Monti and Sergio Siorpaes of Italy won the gold medal. Tennant and Sheffield still hold a place in American bobsled history as they are the highest placing two-man Olympic or World Championship team since 1961. USA two-man teams won bronze medals in 1967, 1997, and 2009.

Tennant was born in Kimball, West Virginia on March 29, 1938. He died in Princeton, West Virginia on April 21, 2024. He served in the United States Marine Corps.
