= Carswell, West Virginia =

Unincorporated community in West Virginia, United States

Carswell
- Unincorporated community
- View of a wooded area in Carswell, West Virginia in 2026

- Location within the state of West Virginia Carswell (the United States)
- Coordinates: 37°26′22″N 81°30′31″W
- Country: United States
- State: West Virginia
- County: McDowell
- Time zone: UTC-5 (Eastern (EST))
  - Summer (DST): UTC-4 (EDT)
- GNIS feature ID: 1554079

Carswell is an unincorporated community located in McDowell County, West Virginia, United States. Carswell lies to the north of the town of Kimball.
