= Jean Battlo =

American playwright (1939–2024)

- Born: July 4, 1939; Kimball, West Virginia, U.S.
- Died: August 3, 2024 (aged 85)
- Occupations: Playwright, theatre artist, author

Teresa Jean Battlo (July 4, 1939 – August 3, 2024) was an American playwright from West Virginia. She is known for writing plays on Appalachian themes and history, which have been performed in several states.

== Life and career ==
Battlo was born and raised in Kimball, in McDowell County, West Virginia. Her parents were Italian immigrants who moved to West Virginia to work in the coal mines. After attending Welch High School in Welch, Battlo earned a B.A. and an M.A. at Marshall University where she studied history, drama, and literature, and minored in philosophy. Battlo has also completed 35 hours of classical studies at William and Mary. She launched her writing career by publishing two volumes of poetry, Bonsai and Modern Haiku.

At the request of a local theatre group, Battlo wrote her first plays, A Highly Successful West Virginia Business and Caves. The group turned to Battlo, whose poetry had established her as a writer, for new plays because they could not afford the royalties for most established playwrights. Her West Virginia plays attempt to dispel widely held stereotypes of Appalachian people and West Virginians. Battlo said, "These people are not caricatures, not ‘mammy Yokums, not hillbilly stereotypes. These are people I live with. They’re real. They watch CNN. They know what’s going on in the world. They just haven’t lost touch with their roots." From 1987–1989, Battlo served as Writer-in-Residence for Theatre West Virginia, in Beckley, where she continued to teach playwriting workshops.

Many of Battlo's plays focus on historical themes. #8 tells the story of a Jewish family shortly before the Holocaust. Between Two Worlds was written to celebrate the centennial of West Virginia author Pearl S. Buck's birth. The play The House on Second Street is about the Lizzie Borden murders. With help from a West Virginia Humanities Council seed grant, Battlo researched the 1921 murder of "Smilin'" Sid Hatfield, which became the basis for the 2000 play The Terror of the Tug. The Terror of the Tug is performed every summer by McArts, the McDowell County community arts organization, which Battlo founded and directed.

Battlo established the Globe Stage in McDowell County, which is a replica of Shakespeare's Globe Theatre.

Battlo was also the founder of Coal Camp Creations, under the auspices of McArts. Coal Camp Creations brings together West Virginia artists and craftspeople to produce artistic statues out of coal mined in McDowell County.

Battlo died on August 3, 2024, at the age of 85.

== Critical response and awards ==
Scenes from Battlo's plays Frog Songs and Shakespeare: Love in Series were included in Linda Pinnell's textbook Getting Started in Theater.

The House on Second Street was a finalist in the 1998 Forest-Shiras Competition. The play #8 was a finalist for Camel-Sea and a finalist for the Eugene O'Neill National Playwright's Competition in 1990, and was optioned by Off-Broadway Stage Arts.

Her plays have been performed throughout Appalachia. Companies that have staged Battlo's works include: the Tennessee Stage Company, the Southern Appalachian Repertory Theater in North Carolina, and Theater West Virginia and the Charleston Stage Company, both in West Virginia.

Battlo won awards in 1997 and 1998 for her earliest books of poetry, Bonsai and Modern Haiku.

In 1992 she was nominated for and awarded the Italian-American Woman of the Year honor.

== Published works ==
=== Plays ===
- #8
- Caves
- Frog Songs
- A Highly Successful West Virginia Business
- The House on Second Street
- The Little Theater's Production of "Hamlet"
- The Morning Glory Tree
- Of Freckled Human Nature
- Shakespeare: Love in Series, co-authored with Alma Bennett
- The Terror of the Tug
- Voltaire's Confession

=== Other published works ===
- Bonsai
- Modern Haiku
- Pictorial History of McDowell County
- The Mahotep Synod
- Appalachian Gothic Tales
- McDowell County in West Virginia and American History
- Behold the Man
