= Lincoln Institute =

Lincoln Institute may refer to:

- Abraham Lincoln Institute, Maryland, US
- Lincoln Institute (Kentucky), a former high school near Louisville, US
- Lincoln Institute of Health Sciences, now part of La Trobe University in Melbourne as of 1987
- Lincoln Institute of Land Policy, a think tank in Cambridge, Massachusetts, US
- Lincoln Institute (Missouri), now Lincoln University, Missouri, US

== See also ==
- Lincoln Academy (disambiguation)
- Lincoln College (disambiguation)
- Lincoln School (disambiguation)
- Lincoln University (disambiguation)
