= Lincoln School (Belle Fourche, South Dakota) =

- U.S. National Register of Historic Places
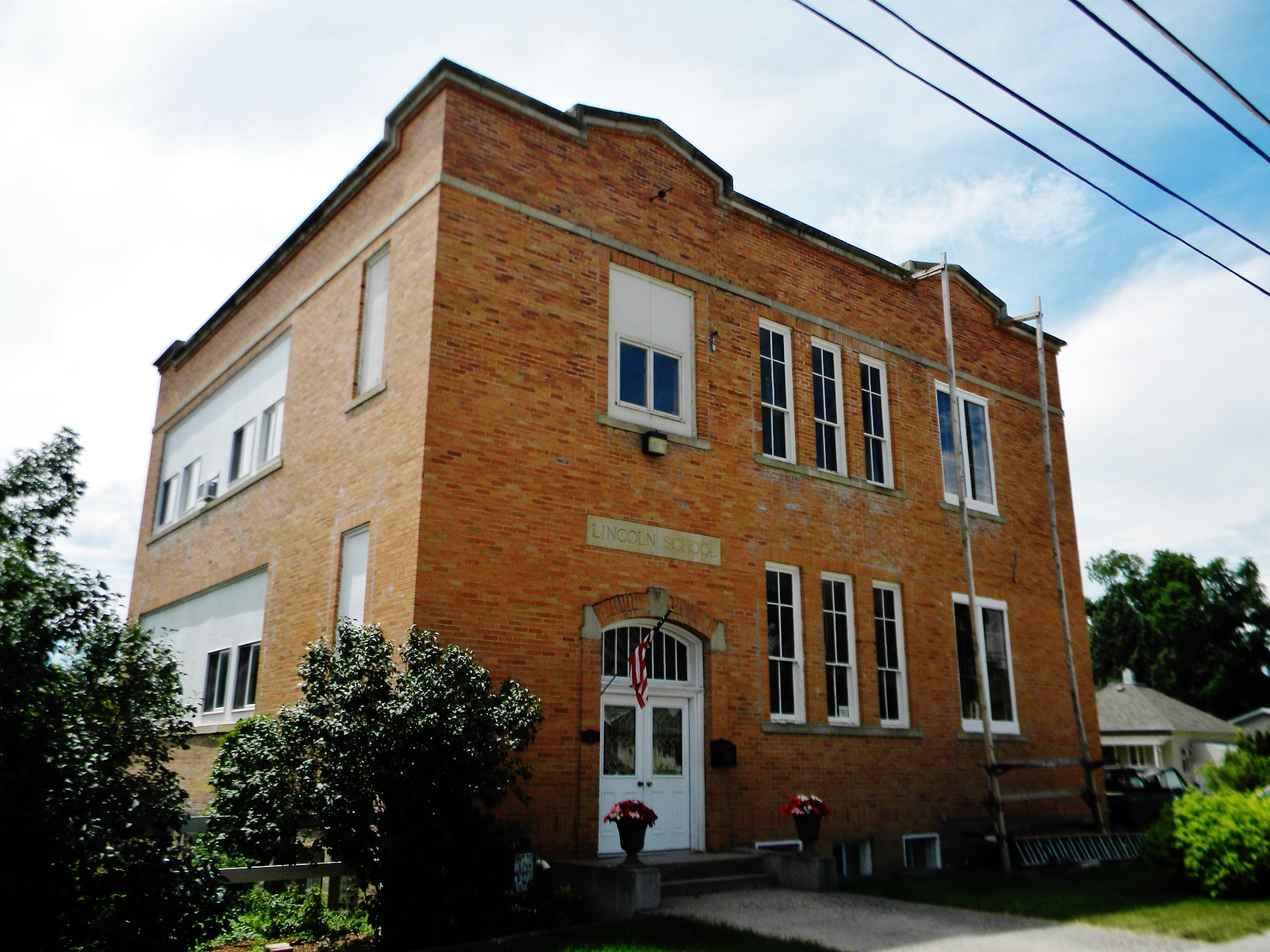
- Lincoln School in 2015

- Location within South Dakota
- Location: 706 Jackson Street, Belle Fourche, South Dakota
- Coordinates: 44°40′00″N 103°51′00″W
- Area: less than one acre
- Built: 1919
- Built by: W. W. Beach Co.
- MPS: Schools in South Dakota MPS
- NRHP reference No.: 01000098
- Added to NRHP: February 9, 2001

The Lincoln School is a historic school building located in Belle Fourche, South Dakota. It was listed on the National Register of Historic Places in 2001.

== History ==
The Lincoln School was built in 1919 as part of a statewide school building standardization program. This initiative aimed to replace the small, timber-framed, rural schoolhouses with larger, rectangular buildings, often built of stone or brick. The W. W. Beach Company of Sioux City, Iowa, was contracted to carry out construction.

By the 1950s, the state was already looking to replace the school, which was far too small to meet the growing local education demands; in 1953, state surveys estimated Lincoln School was operating 68% over capacity. The school shut down in the 1960s and served as office space. It was purchased for use as a single-family dwelling in the 1990s and remains so today.

== Architecture ==
Lincoln School sits in the middle of a residential area at the southeast corner of Jackson Street and 7th Avenue. The square, two-story school building itself does not adhere to any specific architectural style but does include some Romanesque elements that were typical of schoolhouses built during this era. It is constructed out of brown brick and is simple in ornamentation, with only a thin belt course between the roof and second-story windows. The windows, although not original, are still mostly in their original positions. These are encircled by decorative masonry with concrete sills. The main entrance is located on the right side of the northern facade and is encircled by a slightly raised brick and concrete archway. Its roof is flat and features a few gabled parapets that are flush with the rest of the building.

Inside, the school originally consisted of only four rooms and a basement. Hallways ran the width of one side of the building on both floors, which led into the classrooms. A multi-purpose room, restrooms, and the boiler were located in the basement.
