= Manatee High School =

Public high school in Bradenton, Florida, United States

Location
- 902 33rd Street Court West; Bradenton, Florida 34205; United States; 27°29′30″N 82°35′39″W

Information
- Type: Public Secondary, Coeducational
- Established: 1897
- School district: Manatee County School District
- Superintendent: Laurie Breslin
- Principal: Shannon Fleming
- Staff: 90.00 (FTE)
- Grades: 9–12
- Enrollment: 1,998 (2024–2025)
- Student to teacher ratio: 22.20
- Colors: Red, blue and white
- Nickname: Hurricanes
- Rival: Palmetto High School Southeast High School
- Accreditation: Southern Association, Florida Department of Education
- Newspaper: The Macohi
- Yearbook: 'Cane Echo
- Website: School website
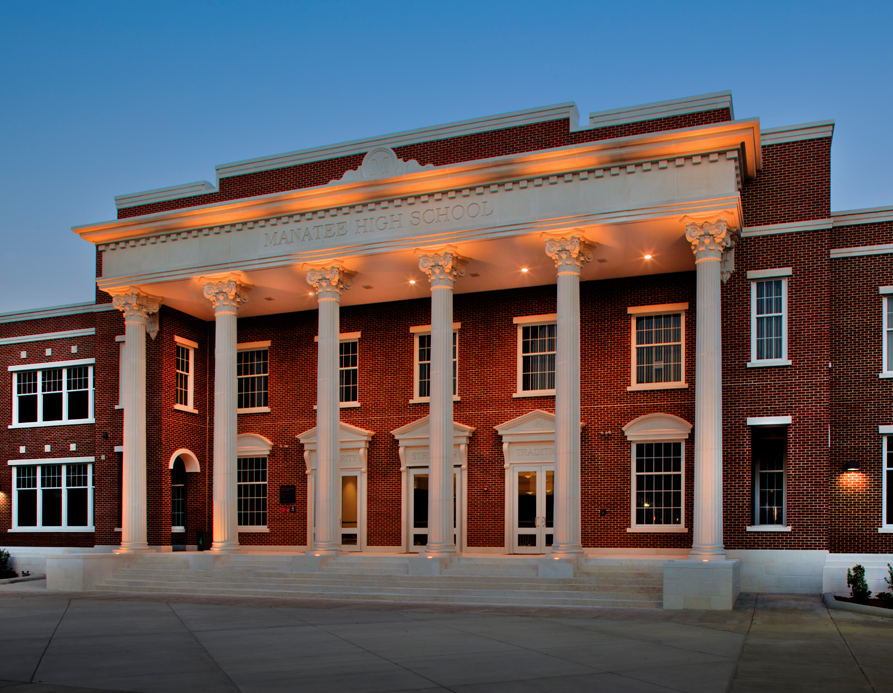
- Manatee High School's Davis Building

Manatee High School is the oldest public high school in Bradenton, Florida, operated by the Manatee County School District.

== History ==
Bradentown High School opened in 1897 on what is now 15th Street West and Ballard Park Drive operating out of a wooden two-story building. A brick building replaced the original building in 1912. The original building became the Bradentown Intermediate School serving students from 3rd to 6th grade until closing in 1923 when a replacement was built. After the new intermediate school was built the old one bought by Bradenton's municipal government and demolished. Sometime prior to 1915 students who lived across the Manatee River in Palmetto started attending the school and it became known as Manatee County High School. Sometime during the 1920s it became known as Bradenton High School as a high school was created in Palmetto.

African American students were excluded and attended Lincoln Academy and then Lincoln High School in Bradenton and Memorial High School in Palmetto which were combined into Lincoln Memorial High School in Palmetto. A documentary film about their history is called Through the Tunnel, named for the tunnel used to reach the school's athletic field across U.S. 41. Many of Lincoln Memorial High Schools students were integrated into Manatee High School in the wave of desegregation when Lincoln High was made into a middle school.

In 1930, Bradenton High School relocated to the site where Biltmore Grade School formerly operated. The Biltmore Grade School was originally built in 1926 but closed one year later because of the collapse of the Florida Land Boom. The school's second location would end up becoming the Bradenton Junior High School in 1938 serving students in 7th to 9th grade before being made into the county school district administration offices in 1956 which served in that role until being demolished in 1989 when a new administration building was built. The building that formerly housed the Biltmore Grade School became known as the Davis Building after a longtime principal of the school, Paul F. Davis. Both Bradenton High School and Palmetto High School merged with each other in 1947 and the school would be renamed once again to Manatee County High School but ended up splitting again in 1959 with the school getting the name Manatee High School. Walker Junior High School which existed across the street from Manatee High School would be absorbed by Manatee High in 1969 as a part of the school district doing redistricting for desegregation. In 1997 a major redesign for the Davis Building that included new classrooms, a science-technology building, gym, and administration building was constructed. Most of Walker Junior High School was demolished in 1998 with only the western portion remaining. The Davis Building was demolished in 2011 and replaced.

== The Macohi ==
The school newspaper, The Macohi, takes its name from the school's former name, Manatee County High School, combining the first two letters of each word to create "Macohi." Originally published as The Oracle, the paper is now in its 107th volume. In 1990, the paper was awarded a Silver Crown Newspaper (for high schools) by the Columbia Scholastic Press Association. The school's yearbook is the "'Cane Echo." Both publications are currently advised by Meaghan Malone.

== Notable people ==
=== Alumni ===
- Bill Anderson – former NFL tight end
- Lucius D. Battle – diplomat (graduated from Bradenton High School)
- Chris Berry – broadcaster
- Brandon Carnes – professional track and field athlete
- Kelly Cassidy – congresswoman from Illinois
- Demarcus Christmas – NFL defensive tackle for Seattle Seahawks
- Ed Culpepper – former NFL player
- Kathleen Flinn – author
- Tommie Frazier – football player at Nebraska, member of College Football Hall of Fame
- David Lawrence Jr. – journalist
- Jill McCormick – former fashion model and philanthropist
- Brian McRae – MLB center fielder
- Alvoid Mays – former NFL player
- Scott Makar former Florida Solicitor General (2007-2011), judge for the 1st Florida District Court of Appeal (2012–2022) and current judge on the 5th Florida District Court of Appeal (2023–present).
- Dan Miller – former congressman representing Florida's 13th congressional district from 1993 to 2003. During the September 11 attacks, Representative Miller was with President George W. Bush.
- Chris Perez – MLB relief pitcher
- Ace Sanders – former NFL wide receiver for Jacksonville Jaguars
- Robby Stevenson – former kicker for Florida Gators
- Willie Taggart – head coach for Florida Atlantic Owls football, former head coach of Florida State Seminoles football, Oregon Ducks football and South Florida Bulls football
- Richard Trapp – former AFL wide receiver prior to NFL merger
- Tyrone Williams – former NFL player
- Jimmy Heagerty- Houseguest of Big Brother 27

=== Staff ===
- Former head football coach David Braine went on to become a college athletic director, most recently at Georgia Tech.
- Former assistant football coach Danny Hope went on to become the head coach at Purdue.
- Former assistant football coach Hootie Ingram went on to become athletic director at FSU.

== Athletics ==
Manatee High School athletic teams have won 16 FHSAA state championships. The following sports are available to students at Manatee:

- Baseball (boys)
  - State champs – 1925, 1931, 1932, 1942 & 1963
- Basketball (boys and girls)
- Cheerleading (girls)
- Competitive Cheerleading (girls)
  - State champs – 2013
- Cross country (boys and girls)
- Football (boys)
  - State champs – 1983, 1985, 1989, 1992 & 2011
- Golf (boys and girls)
- Lacrosse (boys and Girls)
- Soccer (boys and girls)
- Softball (girls)
- Swimming and diving (boys and girls)
- Tennis (boys and girls)
  - Boys state champ – 1985
- Track and Field (boys and girls)
  - Boys state champs – 1955–1957
- Volleyball (girls)
- Weightlifting (boys and girls)
  - Boys state champ – 1990
- Wrestling (boys)
- Flag Football (girls)

=== Hawkins Stadium ===
Manatee High School's sports venue is the Joe Kinnan Field at Hawkins Stadium. It is the home stadium for the Manatee Hurricanes, the school's football team.
