= Lincoln County Middle School =

Lincoln County Middle School may refer to:

- Lincoln County Middle School (Lincolnton, Georgia), Lincolnton, Georgia
- Lincoln County Middle School (Kentucky), Stanford, Kentucky
