= Abraham Lincoln High School =

Abraham Lincoln High School may refer to:

- Abraham Lincoln High School (Los Angeles, California)
- Abraham Lincoln High School (San Francisco)
- Abraham Lincoln High School (San Jose, California)
- Abraham Lincoln High School (Colorado), Denver, Colorado
- Abraham Lincoln High School (Council Bluffs, Iowa)
- Abraham Lincoln High School (Des Moines, Iowa)
- Abraham Lincoln High School (Minnesota), Bloomington, closed in 1982
- Abraham Lincoln High School (Brooklyn), New York
- Abraham Lincoln High School (Philadelphia), Pennsylvania
- Abraham Lincoln High School (Port Arthur, Texas), merged into Memorial High School

== See also ==
- Lincoln High School (disambiguation)
