= FIBT World Championships 1961 =

Winter sport competition

1961 World Championships
- Location: Lake Placid, New York

The FIBT World Championships 1961 took place in Lake Placid, New York, United States for the second time after hosting the event previously in 1949.

== Two man bobsleigh ==
Pos	Team	Time
Gold	Italy (Eugenio Monti, Sergio Siorpaes)	
Silver	United States (Gary Sheffield, Jerry Tennant)	
Bronze	Italy (Sergio Zardini, Romano Bonagura)	

Monti won his fifth straight championship in this event, a record that still stands as of 2008. Zardini won his third straight championship medal in this event with his third different brakeman.

== Four man bobsleigh ==
Pos	Team	Time
Gold	Italy (Eugenio Monti, Sergio Siorpaes, Furio Nordio, Renzo Alverà)	
Silver	United States (Stanley Benham, Gary Sheffield, Jerry Tennant, Chuck Pandolph)	
Bronze	Sweden (Gunnar Åhs, Gunnar Carpö, Erik Wennerberg, Börje-Bengt Hedblom)	

== Medal table ==
Rank	Nation	Gold	Silver	Bronze	Total
1	Italy (ITA)	2	0	1	3
2	United States (USA)	0	2	0	2
3	Sweden (SWE)	0	0	1	1
Totals (3 entries)		2	2	2	6
