= House at 2123 W. Second Street =

Historic house in Iowa, United States

- U.S. National Register of Historic Places
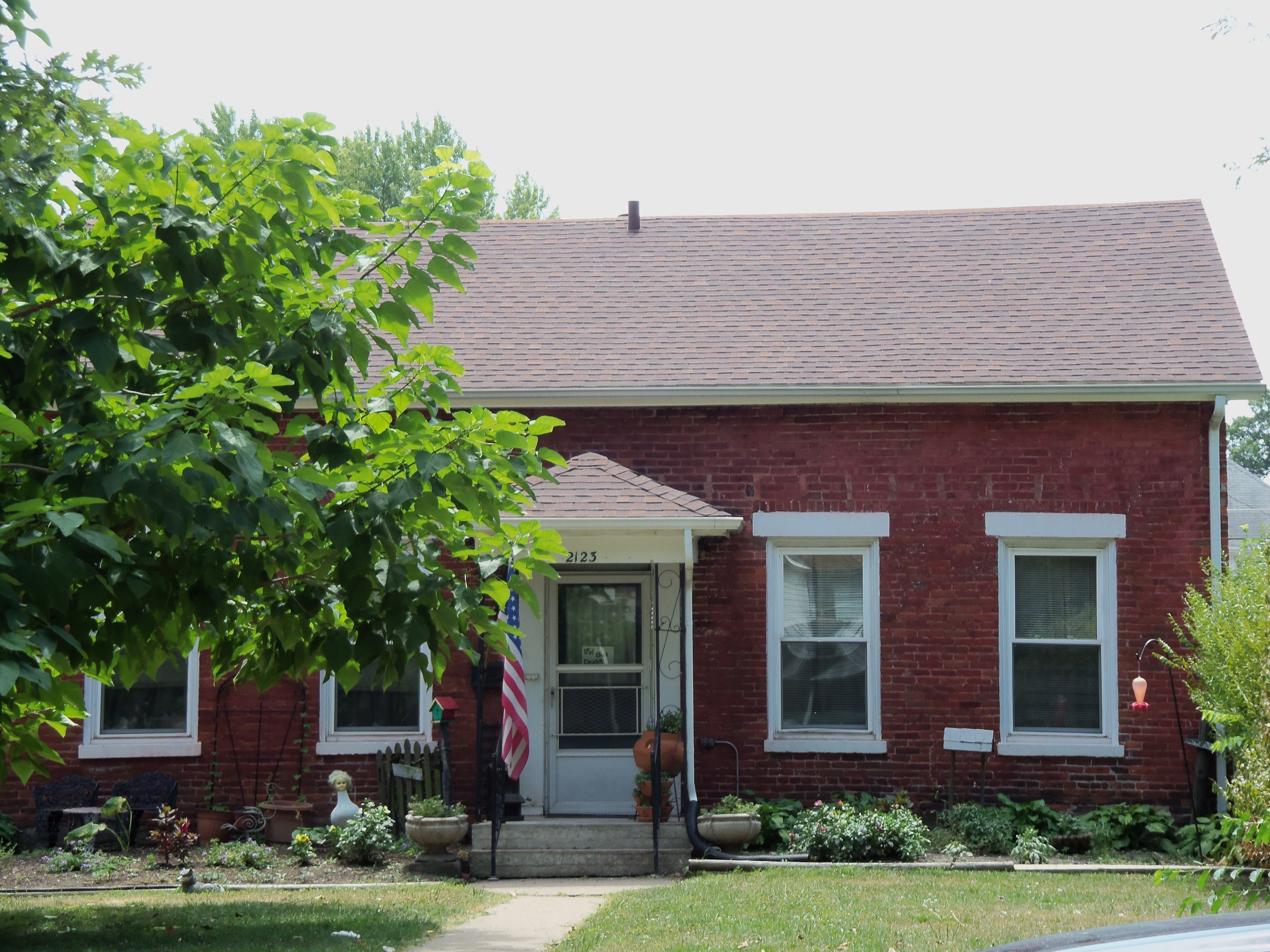

- Location within Iowa Location within the United States
- Location: 2123 W. 2nd St. Davenport, Iowa
- Coordinates: 41°31′15″N 90°36′35″W
- Area: less than one acre
- Built: 1855
- Architectural style: Greek Revival
- MPS: Davenport MRA
- NRHP reference No.: 83002453
- Added to NRHP: July 7, 1983

The House at 2123 W. Second Street is a historic building located in the West End of Davenport, Iowa, United States. Before 1871 the property on which this house is located was owned by Ebenezer and Clarissa Cook, a prominent couple whose family estate was in the neighborhood. The 1½-story brick, Saltbox and Greek Revival style residence was a rarity in Davenport. It has been listed on the National Register of Historic Places since 1983.
