= Lincoln School (Madison, Wisconsin) =

- U.S. National Register of Historic Places
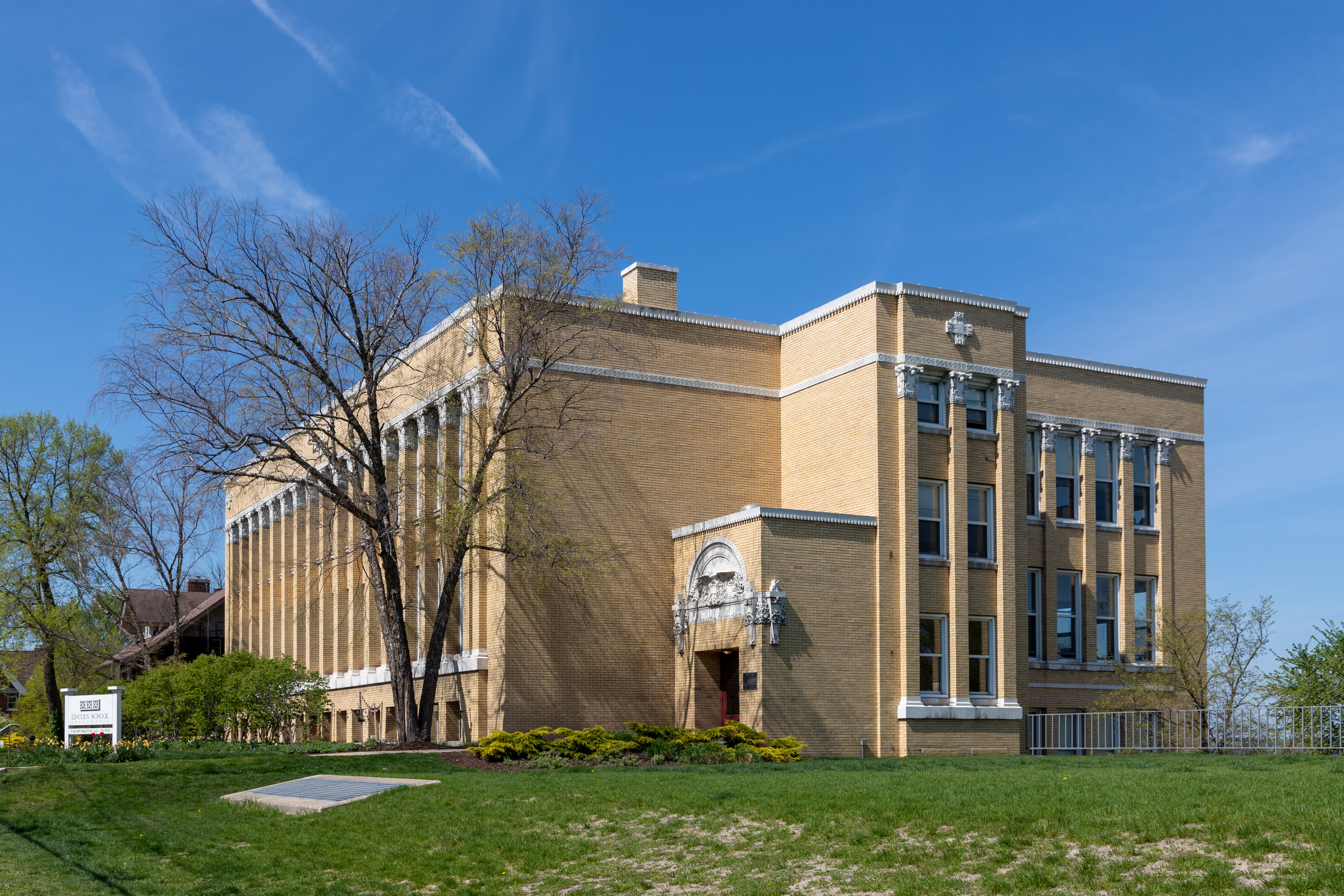

- Location within Wisconsin Location within the United States
- Location: 728 E. Gorham St., Madison, Wisconsin
- Coordinates: 43°04′59″N 89°22′49″W
- Area: 2.6 acres (1.1 ha)
- Built: 1915
- Architect: Claude & Starck
- Architectural style: Prairie School
- NRHP reference No.: 80000123
- Added to NRHP: August 28, 1980

Lincoln School is a historic school building at 728 E. Gorham Street in Madison, Wisconsin. The school was built in 1915 on the site of the Second Ward School, which had been in operation since 1866. Architects Claude and Starck, who designed several other Wisconsin schools along with libraries throughout the Midwest, designed the school in the Prairie School style. The school has a yellow brick exterior with terra cotta banding, multi-story brick pilasters topped with terra cotta capitals separating its windows, and a terra cotta tympanum atop both main entrances. The terra cotta moldings have the same designs as the Merchants National Bank in Winona, Minnesota; its architects, Purcell and Elmslie, were colleagues of Claude and Starck and likely gave them permission to copy the design. The school operated until 1963, when the Madison Art Center moved into the building; the Art Center left in 1980, and it was converted to apartments in 1985.

The school was added to the National Register of Historic Places on August 28, 1980.
