= East Range Academy of Technology and Science =

Location
- 2000 Siegel Boulevard, Eveleth, Minnesota 55734; United States
- 47.480556°N 92.520278°W

Information
- Type: Public Charter High School
- Established: 2007
- Faculty: About 17.0
- Grades: 9–12
- Enrollment: 115 (as of 2014–2015)
- Website: mnerats.org

East Range Academy of Technology and Science (ERATS) is a public charter high school located in Mt. Iron, Minnesota, United States, serving grades 9th to 12th. ERATS is Minnesota Public Charter School #4166 and is authorized by Osprey Wilds formerly known as Audubon Center of the North Woods. ERATS serves students from many Iron Range towns including Eveleth, Gilbert, Virginia, Mt. Iron, Buhl, Chisholm, Hibbing, Cherry, Biwabik, Aurora, and Hoyt Lakes. ERATS is located near Walmart and Lake Country Power in Mt. Iron off Highway 169. As of the 2022–2023 school year, the school had an enrollment of approximately 160 students and 35 staff members.
