= Lincoln School (Davenport, Iowa) =

- U.S. National Register of Historic Places
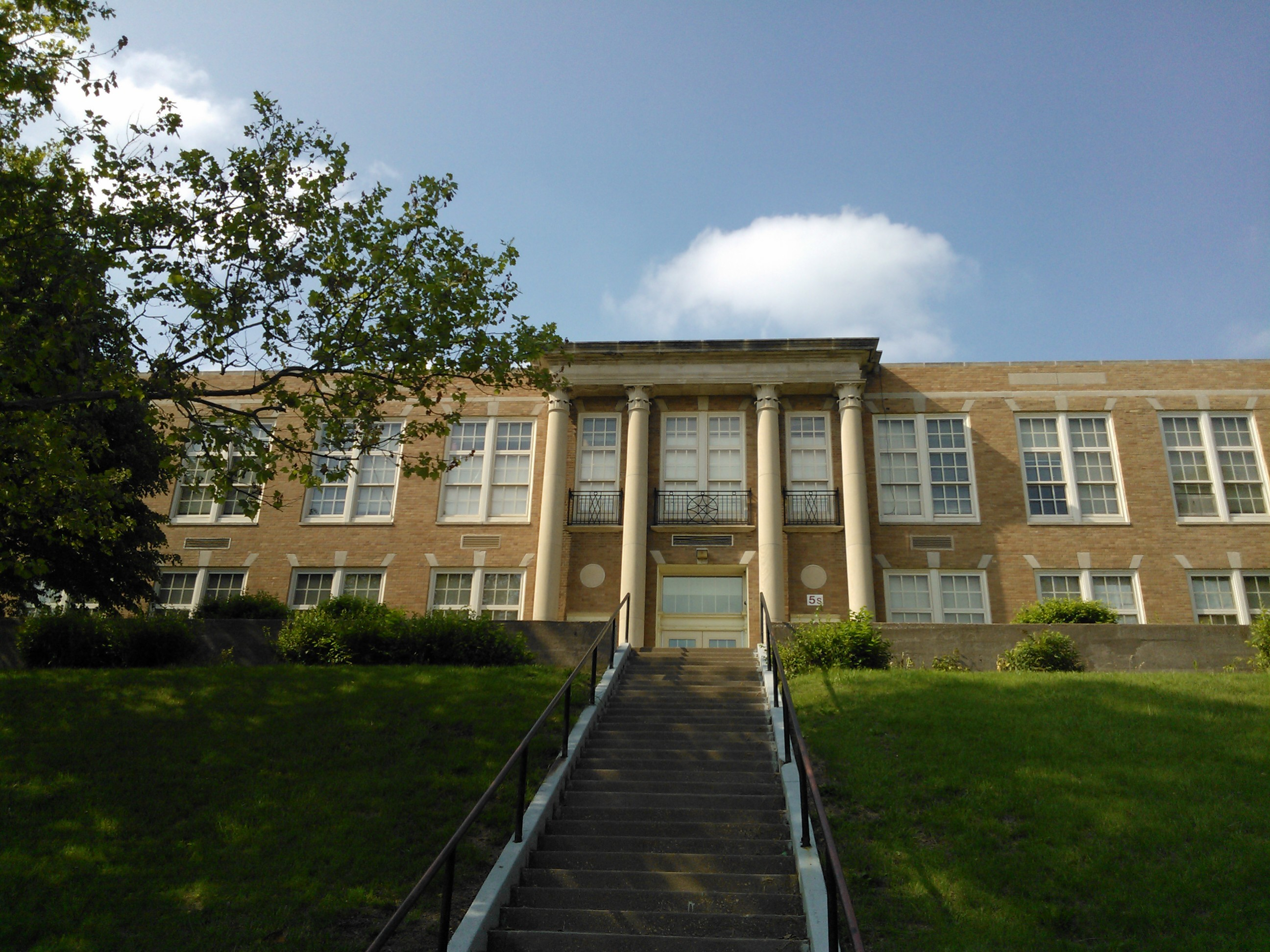

- Location within Iowa Location within the United States
- Location: 318 E. 7th St. Davenport, Iowa
- Coordinates: 41°31′37″N 90°34′13″W
- Area: 3.31 acres (1.34 ha)
- Built: 1940
- Architect: Smith & Childs; Howard S. Muesse
- Architectural style: Colonial Revival
- MPS: Public Schools for Iowa: Growth and Change MPS
- NRHP reference No.: 02001239
- Added to NRHP: October 24, 2002

Lincoln School is located on the east side of Davenport, Iowa, United States. It has been listed on the National Register of Historic Places since 2002.

== History ==
The Davenport Board of Education did an evaluation of its elementary school facilities in the 1920s as well as a study of the projected growth of the city and where that growth would take place. The projection was for the number of elementary-aged students to rise by almost three thousand students between 1930 and 1950, but no building plan based on these projections was prepared. The elementary school population, however, already rose to that projection by 1936. The board decided at that time to close twelve of its old elementary school buildings and build six new ones. The plan would cost the school district $2.5 million with the federal government contributing 45% of the costs as part of the Public Works Administration. In addition to Lincoln, the new elementary schools included Monroe, Madison, Washington, Jefferson, and McKinley. Lincoln was the only new facility to be built on the location of one of the older buildings.

The floor plans for all six school buildings were designed by the Chicago architectural firm of Smith & Childs, and they are all similar in layout. Local architects were employed to design the stylistic features for each building. Davenport architect Howard S. Muesse was chosen for Lincoln School. The building was constructed by Langlois Construction Co. Ground for the new building was broken in 1939 and classes were begun in 1940. Davenport's population continued to increase after World War II and in 1952 second story classrooms were built on the projecting ends of the building and a two-story addition that included classrooms and a cafeteria in the lower level was added to the northwest corner of the building. Three years later Hoover Elementary School was built further to the east to elevate congestion at both Lincoln and McKinley.

Enrollment continued to climb during the 1960s and started to decline in the 1970s. The decline continued into the first decade of the 21st-century. The school became Lincoln Integrated Academy of Arts in 2005, as one of 10 charter schools in the state of Iowa. On April 9, 2012 the Davenport Community School District decided to close Lincoln School at the end of the school year. The decision was based on the need to close a budget deficit and for lack of enrollment. The school district plans to continue maintenance on the building and hopes to find a community use for it.

== Architecture ==
Lincoln School is a three-story structure set on a basement composed of steel-reinforced concrete. The exterior is covered in light brown brick that is accented with limestone. A flat roof tops the building. The main entrance into the building is flanked by four, two-story columns in the Corinthian order. The entrance itself is a double door with a large transom above and it is capped with decorative stone. Wrought iron balconies project from the second story above the entrance. The windows are organized in groups of two, they have decorative stone lintels and they are connected to a stone belt-course. The 1952 addition was built using the same brick as the original building, but the window patterns are different.

The library, gymnasium, auditorium, science, art, and vocal music rooms were located in the center of the building. Also in the center of the building was a separate community room for use by local citizens. The classrooms were separated from these common areas. A kindergarten room with its own exterior entrance was located in the west wing. The gymnasium, auditorium, and the community room were opposite the main entrance and the school office on the first floor. The library was located above the entrance on the second floor. The science, art, and music rooms were located above the gymnasium, auditorium, and the community room on the third floor. They and their storage rooms were the only rooms on that floor. The back wall of the music room curved and the side walls narrowed toward the entrance.
