= Lincoln County High School =

Lincoln County High School can refer to any of the following United States high schools:

- Lincoln County High School (Georgia) in Lincolnton, Georgia
- Lincoln County High School (Kentucky) in Stanford, Kentucky
- Lincoln County High School (Montana) in Eureka, Montana
- Lincoln County High School (Nevada) in Panaca, Nevada
- Lincoln County High School (Tennessee) in Fayetteville, Tennessee
- Lincoln County High School (West Virginia) in West Hamlin, West Virginia
