= Lincoln School (Erie, Colorado) =

- U.S. National Register of Historic Places
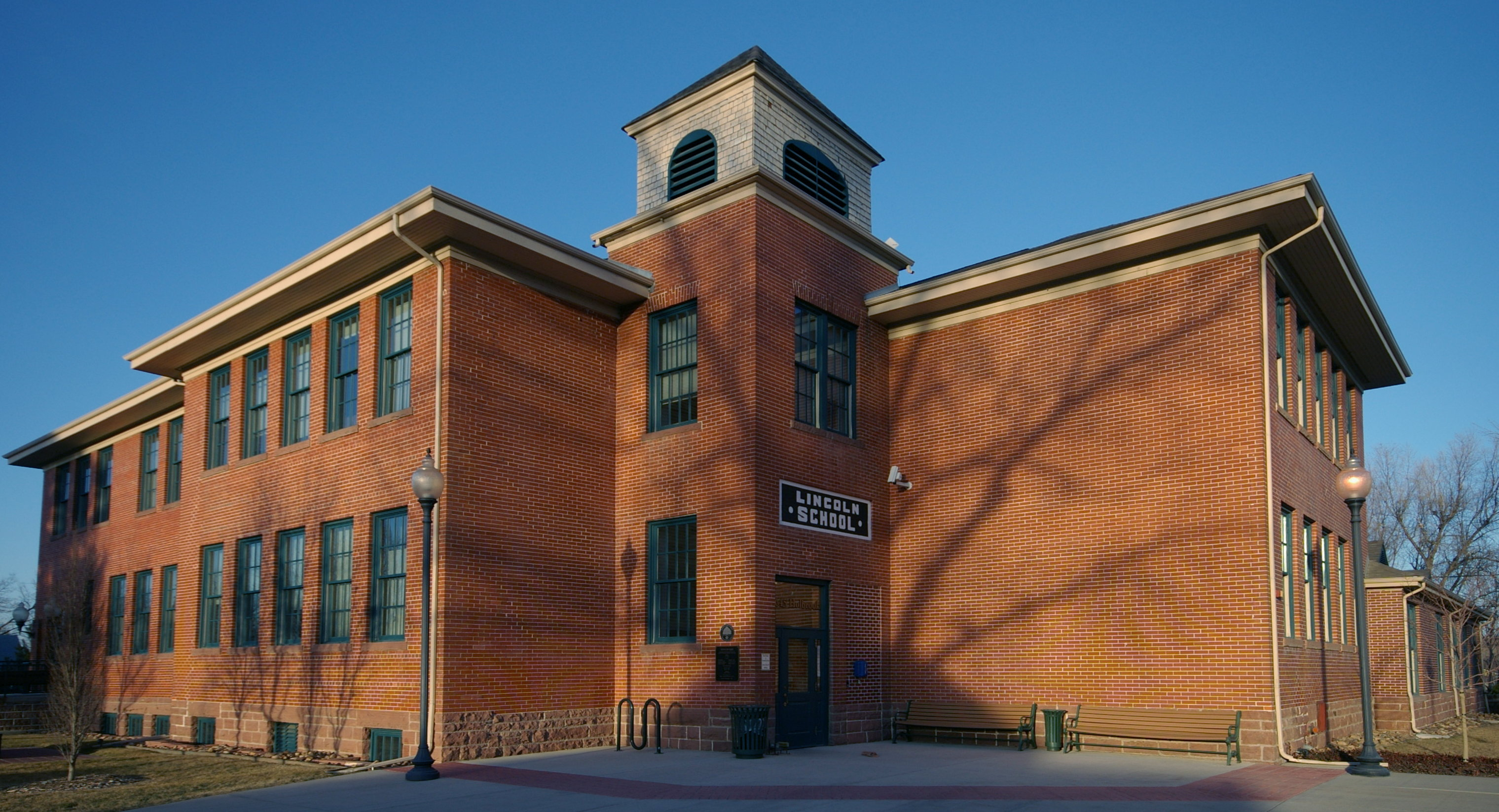

- Location within Colorado
- Location: 645 Holbrook St., Erie, Colorado
- Coordinates: 40.0507°N 105.0499°W
- Area: 1 acre (0.40 ha)
- Built: 1906
- NRHP reference No.: 81000188
- Added to NRHP: July 22, 1981

The Lincoln School in Erie, Colorado, at 645 Holbrook St., was built in 1906. It was listed on the National Register of Historic Places in 1981. It was expanded in 1920 by addition of four more classrooms. It served as a school until 1966. It operated as a school until 1966. In 1981 it was serving as the Erie Town Hall.

In 2021, it is still the town hall. It was renovated and turned into a town hall in 1998. In 2015, it was designated Erie's third local landmark.
