= Lincoln Law School =

Lincoln Law School may refer to one of two unrelated California law schools:

- Lincoln Law School of San Jose, San Jose, California, a part of the Californian Lincoln University until 1993
- Lincoln Law School of Sacramento, Sacramento, California

It may also refer to:

- School of Law at the University of Lincoln in England
- University of Nebraska College of Law in Lincoln, Nebraska
- Lincoln College of Law in Springfield, Illinois
- Lincoln University School of Law in St. Louis, Missouri
