= Davenport Community School District =

Public school district in Davenport, Iowa, United States

Location
- Davenport, Iowa East Central Iowa United States

District information
- Type: Public
- Motto: Growing Excellence
- Grades: K-12
- Established: 1858
- Superintendent: TJ Schneckloth
- Schools: 27
- Budget: $233,260,000 (2020-21)

Students and staff
- Students: 13,523 (2023-24)
- Teachers: 972.56 FTE
- Staff: 1085.90 FTE
- Student–teacher ratio: 13.90
- Athletic conference: Mississippi Athletic Conference

Other information
- Website: www.davenportschools.org

The Davenport Community School District is a public school district in Scott County, Iowa. The school district covers 109 square miles (280 km^{2}) that includes the city of Davenport, where it is based, and the western Scott County communities of Blue Grass, Buffalo and Walcott in addition to a small section of Muscatine County. The district also includes the census-designated place of Plainview.

Founded in 1858, it established one of the first publicly-funded high schools in the United States, the third teachers' training school, and hired the first female superintendent in the country. It serves nearly 16,000 students in 32 school buildings.

== History ==
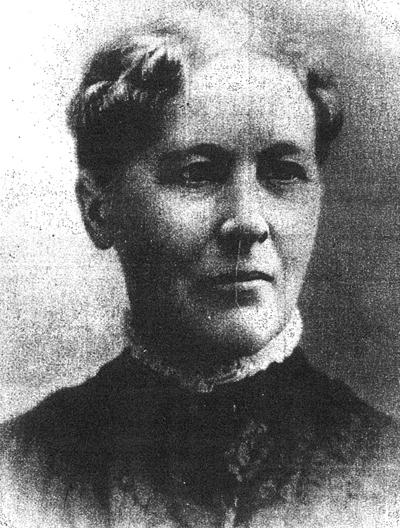
Phebe Sudlow

The first schools in Davenport were subscription schools, where students paid a fee to attend. They were held in crude surplus buildings or in private homes. Marianne Hall opened the first school in 1838 followed by the school started by the Rev. Michael Hummer the same year. The following year, Moses Parmele opened a school, as did the Rev. J.A.M. Pelamourges who opened a school at St. Anthony's Church that remained open until 1968. Similar schools opened in the 1840s. As the population increased in the 1850s there was a desire to establish public supported schools. Six schools were built during the decade. Five were built around the town's commercial and industrial core, and one was built in the Village of East Davenport, which had recently been annexed to Davenport. A school was also founded for African American children at the same time. It lasted for only a short time as there were too few children to justify the expense. Davenport schools were integrated at that time. After a new state constitution and school legislation passed in Iowa, the Davenport Independent School District was formed in 1858.

City founder Antoine LeClaire loaned the new district $500 to get started. Abraham S. Kissell was named the first superintendent for the district as well as the state of Iowa. He had previously been a teacher in Davenport. He supported graded schools and equal pay for female teachers. The district also educated students 14 to 17 from its very beginning in what was called an “intermediate” school. They decided to not call it a high school because a majority of taxpayers did not support funding a high school, which was seen as a way of subsidizing the education of the children from wealthy families. In 1861, Kissell began serving as the president of the Iowa State Teachers Association, and in 1868 he became the Iowa State Superintendent of Schools.

The district's sixth superintendent was Phebe Sudlow who held the position from 1874 to 1929. She had been a teacher and principal in Davenport since 1858. She was the country's first female superintendent. Sudlow insisted and received the same salary as her predecessor. In 1877, she was elected as the president of the Iowa State Teachers Association. She was also the first woman to hold that position. She left Davenport to take a teaching position at the State University of Iowa.

Other innovations the district initiated in the 19th century included adding drawing, physical education, music, and German classes to the curriculum. Most other public schools did not add such courses until the early 20th century. Kindergarten was added to the elementary schools in 1913 and intermediate schools were added in 1919 when Frank L. Smart was the superintendent. While these had been implemented in larger school districts, they were unusual in smaller districts.

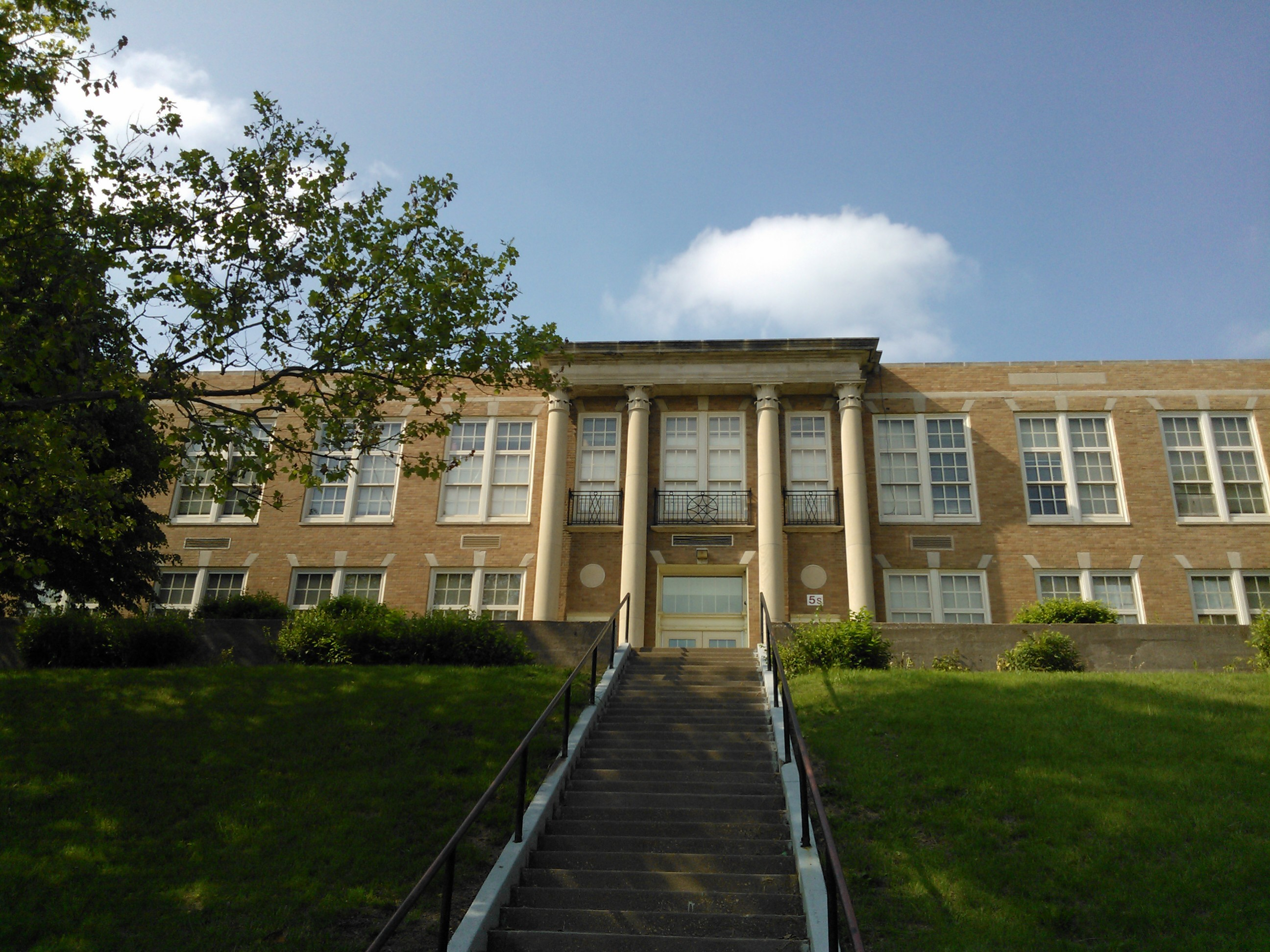
Lincoln Elementary School

The school district operated the Davenport Teacher Training School from 1859 to 1924. At that time, teachers were only required to pass an exam to become a certified teacher. Davenport’s training school provided new teachers with a year of additional classes before they took the exam. The school operated out of various school basements and spare classrooms before it became part of the high school curriculum in 1915. The program ended in 1924 with the advent of state teacher’s colleges and licensing standards.

The Davenport Board of Education evaluated its elementary school facilities in the 1920s and at the same time did a study of the projected growth of the city and where that growth would take place. They projected that the number of elementary-aged students would rise by almost 3,000 students between 1930 and 1950, but they did not prepare a building plan based on these projections. By 1936, the elementary school population had reached the projected number of students. The board decided to close twelve of its old elementary schools and build six new ones. The plan cost the school district $2.5 million with the federal government contributing 45% of the costs that were paid for through the Public Works Administration. The new elementary schools built at that time included Jefferson, Lincoln, Madison, McKinley, Monroe and Washington.

== List of schools ==
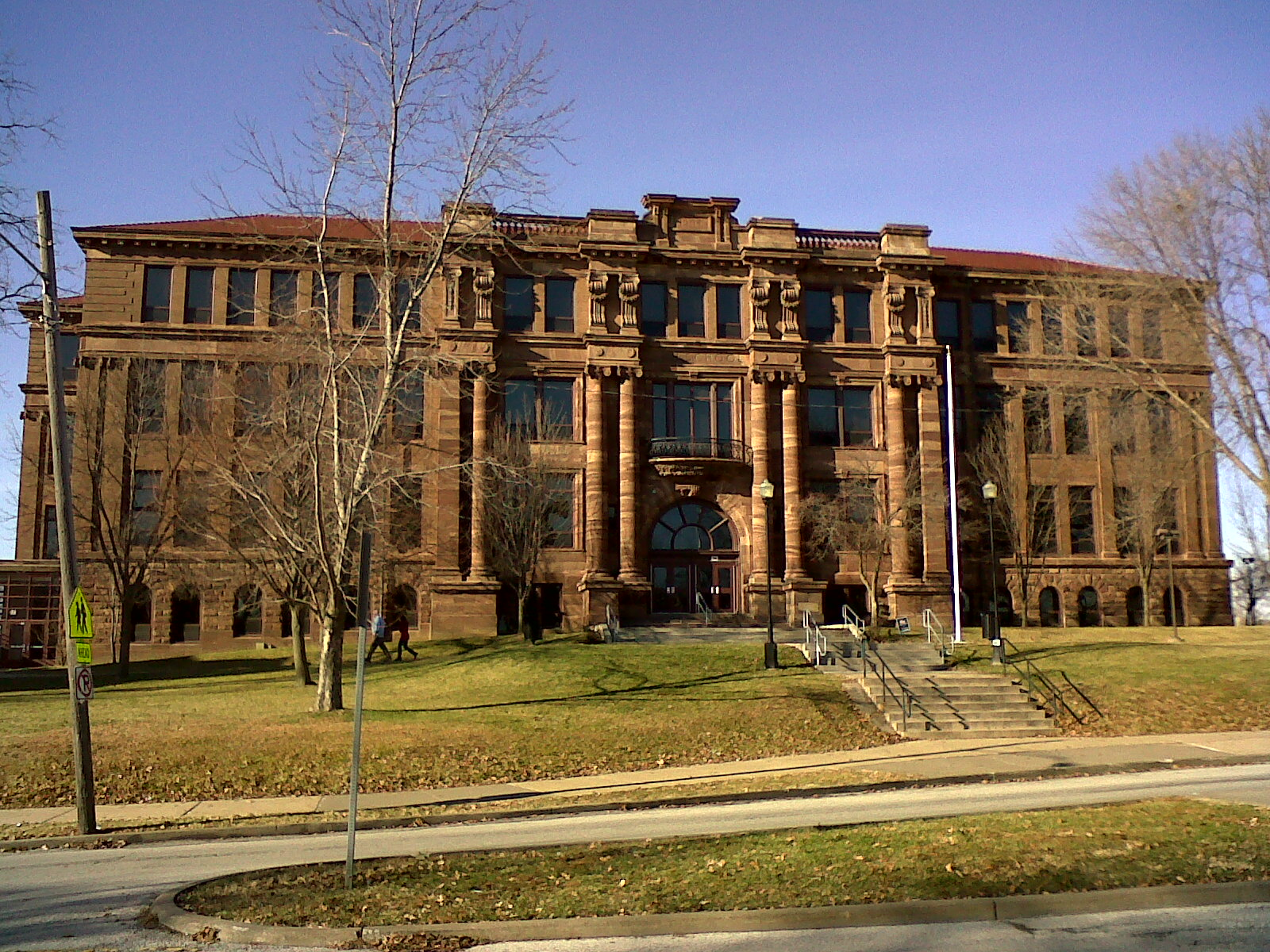
Central High School

High schools

- Central
- North
- West

Alternative school

- Mid City

Intermediate schools

- Smart
- Sudlow
- Walcott
- Williams
- Wood

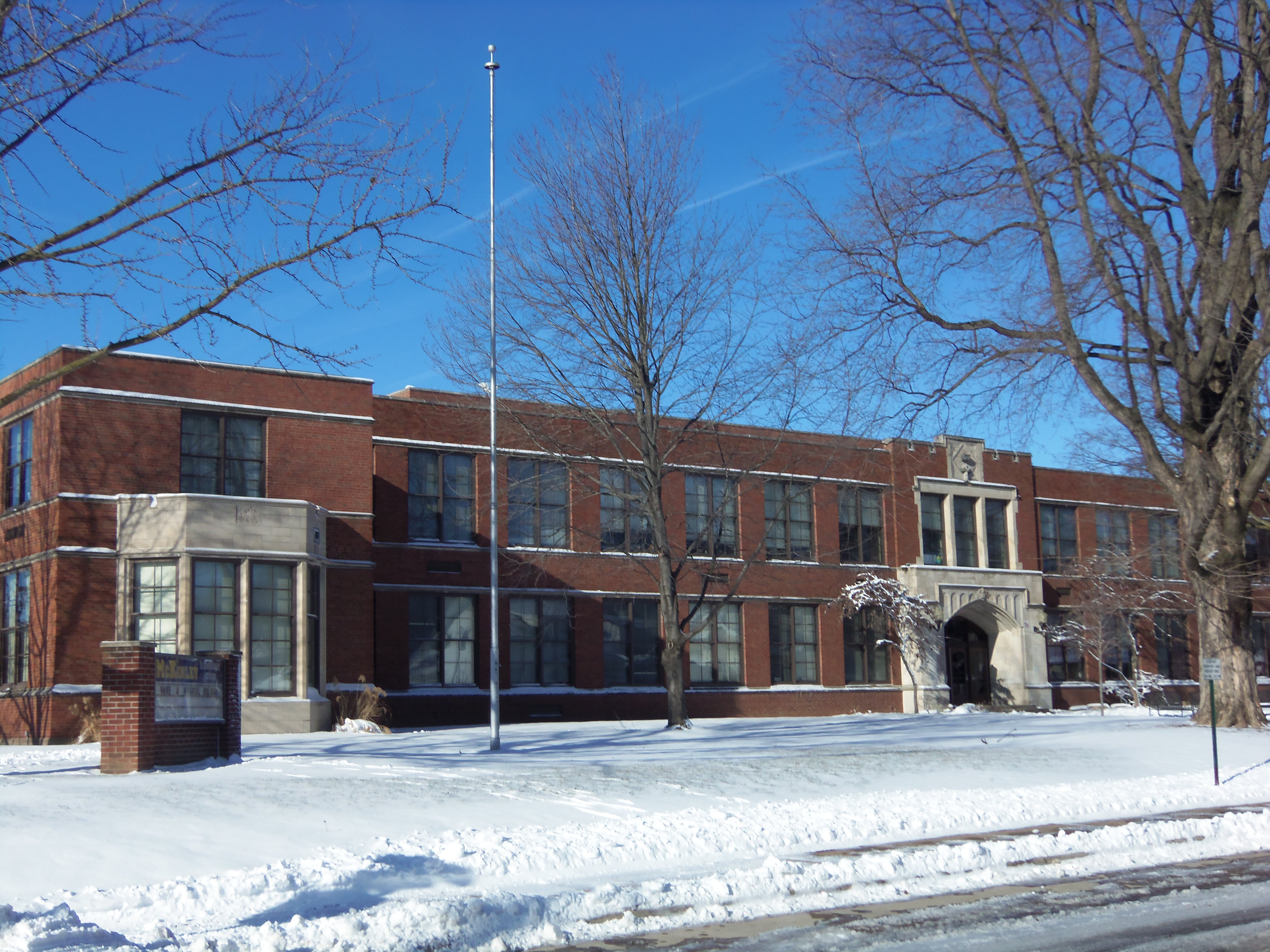
McKinley Elementary School

Elementary schools

- Adams
- Blue Grass
- Buffalo
- Eisenhower
- Fillmore
- Garfield
- Harrison
- Hayes
- Jackson
- Jefferson
- Madison
- McKinley
- Truman
- Walcott
- Wilson

Preschool centers

- Children's Village at Hayes
- Children's Village at Hoover
- Children's Village West

== Closed schools ==
Closed schools

- Rockingham-Roosevelt Elementary (closed 1997-1998)
- Hoover Elementary (closed 1997-1998)
- Perry Elementary (closed 1999-2000)
- Grant Elementary (closed 2001-2002)
- Johnson Elementary (closed 2001-2002)
- Lincoln Elementary/Lincoln Academy for the Arts (closed 2012-2013)
- J. B. Young Intermediate/J.B. Young K-8 (closed 2015-2016)
- Buchanan Elementary (closed 2022-2023)
- Monroe Elementary (closed 2022-2023)
- Washington Elementary (closed 2022-2023)

Historic schools

- Old Washington Elementary (built 1865)
- Old Adams Elementary (built 1854)
- Old Jefferson Elementary (built 1857; closed at the end of the 1918-1919 school year)
- Old Madison Elementary (built 1865)
- Old Monroe Elementary (built 1868)
- Old Jackson Elementary (built 1903)
- Old Van Buren Elementary (built 1903)
- Old Harrison Elementary (built 1871; closed at the end of the 1930-1931 school year)
- Old Tyler Elementary (built 1892)
- Old Polk Elementary (built 1878)
- Old Taylor Elementary (built 1897)
- Old Fillmore Elementary (built 1899)
- Old Pierce Elementary (built 1900)
- Old Buchanan Elementary (built 1904)

== Historic schools ==
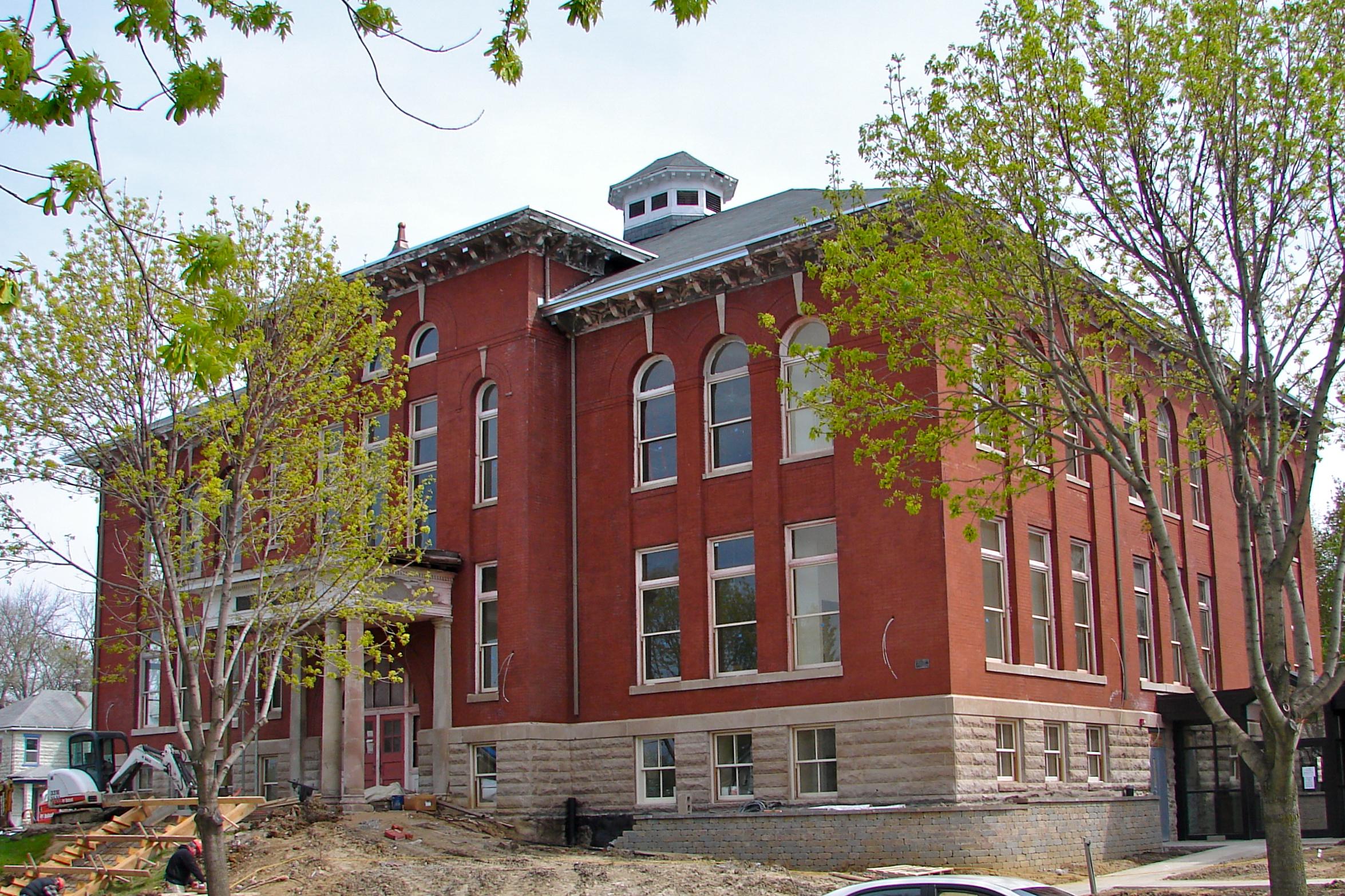
Taylor School

The following is a list of former Davenport public school buildings that are listed on the National Register of Historic Places:

- Buchanan School
- Lincoln School
- Pierce School No. 13
- School Number 6
- Taylor School

== See also ==
- List of school districts in Iowa
