= Lincoln Memorial High School =

Florida high school

Coordinates: 27.5284°N 82.5616°W

Lincoln Memorial High School, established as Lincoln Academy Grammar School, was the only public high school for African Americans in Manatee County, Florida prior to desegregation. Located in Palmetto, Florida, it was originally established as Lincoln Academy in 1930, making it Manatee County's first school for blacks. In 1949, Lincoln Academy was merged with Memorial High School, becoming Lincoln Memorial High School. The high school became Lincoln Middle School in 1969 after desegregation.

== History ==
Established as Lincoln Academy serving area students up to 8th grade, in 1930 the school added 9th through 12th grades. It was Manatee County's first school for blacks. In 1949, Lincoln Academy was merged with Memorial High School which served African American students in Palmetto, becoming Lincoln Memorial High School. When the schools merged, students and faculty selected the Trojan as the school mascot. Eddie Shannon coached the football team. The academy building became Bradenton Elementary School.

The school's football field was on the other side of U.S. 41 and a tunnel was used to access it. The documentary film Through the Tunnel directed by Durand Adams, Charles E. Williams and Charles Clapsaddle was made about the history and the tunnel which remains and connects Lincoln Park and Lincoln Middle School.

Lincoln Memorial High School became Lincoln Middle School in 1969 due to desegregation. Students from Lincoln Memorial High School were dispersed to various schools within Manatee County and the school was designated as a middle school, which it remains to this day. The school building was demolished in 1999 and a new school was constructed.

Lincoln Memorial Academy was a charter school in Palmetto, Florida. The academy's charter was revoked in 2019. A lawsuit challenging the revocation and claiming wrongful termination of the academy's charter was dismissed in 2023.

== Notable alumni ==
- Henry Lawrence, football player

== See also ==
- Manatee High School
