= Lincoln High School (Wheeling, West Virginia) =

School in West Virginia, United States

Coordinates: 40.0714°N 80.7219°W

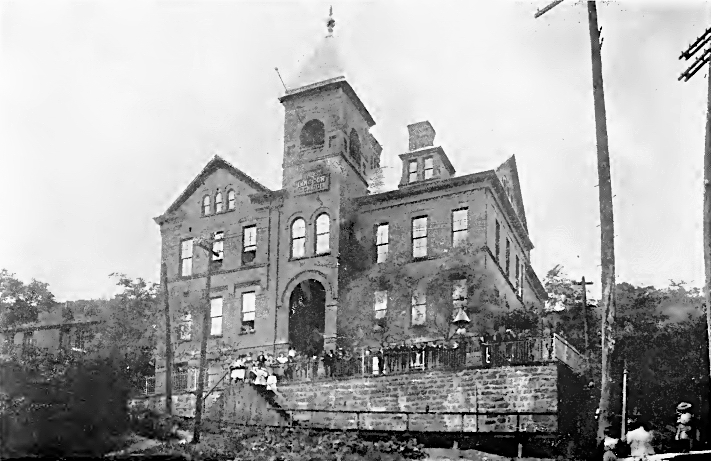

Lincoln High School, originally Lincoln School, was a segregated school for African Americans in Wheeling, West Virginia (Ohio County, West Virginia). It opened after the American Civil War in 1866 and closed in 1954 with desegregation. After 1900 it included a high school. It was where African American children of Ohio County, West Virginia and Marshall County, West Virginia could send their children to public school.

Dr. Hupp and John Jackson founded it in 1866. It opened in a two-room building on Twelfth Street in Wheeling.

Its most recent school building opened on Chapline Street in 1943.

The Ohio County Public Library posted photos from the school's history including images from the school's programs.

Flem B. Jones served as principal and appealed for facilities and staffing.
