= List of shipwrecks in 1895 =

The list of shipwrecks in 1895 includes ships sunk, foundered, grounded, or otherwise lost during 1895.

table of contents
1895
Jan	Feb	Mar	Apr
May	Jun	Jul	Aug
Sep	Oct	Nov	Dec
Unknown date

== January ==
=== 1 January ===
List of shipwrecks: 1 January 1895
Ship	State	Description
Sea Fox	United States	The sloop became waterlogged in a squall one mile (1.6 km) off Eastern Point in Gloucester, Massachusetts on 18 December 1894. Her two crew were rescued by Grace Freeman (United States). She drifted across Cape Cod Bay and went ashore at Race Point in Provincetown, Massachusetts on 1 January 1895.

=== 2 January ===
List of shipwrecks: 2 January 1895
Ship	State	Description
Antoinette	Canada	After losing parts of her masts in the Bristol Channel near Lundy on 1 January during a voyage from Newport, Wales, to Santos, Brazil, with a cargo of coal, the barque broke her tow and drifted onto the Doom Bar in the Camel estuary, where she was wrecked. All of her crew were saved.

=== 5 January ===
List of shipwrecks: 5 January 1895
Ship	State	Description
Eli	United States	The steamer sprung a leak and sank at dock in Little Rock, Arkansas, a total loss.

=== 6 January ===
List of shipwrecks: 6 January 1895
Ship	State	Description
Mattie K.	United States	The steamer was sunk by ice in the Ohio River at Duffie, Ohio. Raised and repaired.
Oneida	United States	The steamer sank in the Little Kanawha River at Parkersburg, West Virginia. Raised and repaired. Back in service by May.

=== 6 January ===
List of shipwrecks: 6 January 1895
Ship	State	Description
R. E. Phillips	United States	The steamer was sunk by ice in the Ohio River at New Matamoras, Ohio. Raised, repaired, and returned to service as F. A. Goebel.

=== 10 January ===
List of shipwrecks: 10 January 1895
Ship	State	Description
Aurelea	United States	The steamer ran ashore in Mispellion Creek, careened and filled. Refloated soon after.

=== 11 January ===
List of shipwrecks: 11 January 1895
Ship	State	Description
Bell	United States	The steamer sank in a windstorm while lying at Caruthersville, Missouri, a total loss.
Cupid	United Kingdom	The schooner sank in the Teifi Estuary. She was later refloated.

=== 12 January ===
List of shipwrecks: 12 January 1895
Ship	State	Description
Diana	United States	The steamer sprung a leak and sank while lying at Decker's Station, Indiana in the White River. Her machinery was salvaged.
J. F. Joy	United States	The railroad transfer steamer sank when her fore and aft hog chains parted while off loading railroad cars opposite Helena, Arkansas. Raised and repaired.
State of Missouri	United States	The steamer sank after striking the bank of the Ohio River near Wolf Creek 75 miles (121 km) below Louisville, a total loss. Four killed.

=== 14 January ===
List of shipwrecks: 14 January 1895
Ship	State	Description
Unknown coal boats	United States	The tow steamer Boaz (United States) was caught in fog near Hog Point in the Ohio River 11 miles (18 km) below Louisville striking the bank hard resulting in the sinking of 17 coal boats and 2 fuel flats.

=== 17 January ===
List of shipwrecks: 17 January 1895
Ship	State	Description
Cape-Fear	United States	The steamer broke in two at Fayetteville, North Carolina when flood water receded leaving her on the bank.

=== 18 January ===
List of shipwrecks: 18 January 1895
Ship	State	Description
Olive	United Kingdom	The ship foundered in West Bay, Dorset.
Ravenswood	United States	The steamer burned at dock in Jacksonville, Florida, a total loss. The fire may have been arson.
Ruth F.	United States	The steamer burned at Rainier Beach, Seattle, Lake Washington.

=== 19 January ===
List of shipwrecks: 19 January 1895
Ship	State	Description
Nat. F. Dortch	United States	The steamer struck a snag and sank at Poland Landing, Louisiana in the Red River. Later raised, repaired and returned to service.

=== 21 January ===
List of shipwrecks: 21 January 1895
Ship	State	Description
Chicora	United States	The steamer sank in a gale in Lake Michigan 10 miles (16 km) off Milwaukee, Wisconsin, in 35 fathoms (210 ft; 64 m) of water. The wreck was located in 1917. The vessel was lost with all 23 hands and 1 passenger.
Margaret	United States	The steamer was destroyed by fire while lying at the mouth of the Houston River, a total loss.
Port Errol	United Kingdom	The full-rigged ship, on her maiden voyage, caught fire in the Clyde and was scuttled. Subsequently refloated, sold and repaired.

=== 23 January ===
List of shipwrecks: 23 January 1895
Ship	State	Description
Henrietta	United States	The steamer struck a snag and sank in Bayou Plaquemine. Later raised.

=== 24 January ===
List of shipwrecks: 24 January 1895
Ship	State	Description
Hebe	Norway	The barque was abandoned in the North Sea.

=== 26 January ===
List of shipwrecks: 26 January 1895
Ship	State	Description
Leader	United States	The fishing schooner was wrecked on a ledge south of the Norman's Woe bell buoy in a snowstorm and heavy seas. Four of the crew were killed.
Unknown barges	United States	Five unknown barges, under the tow of the tugboat Sea King (United States), broke loose from Sea King and sank in a gale and snowstorm off Point Judith. Between the five barges twelve crew died and two were rescued by Sea King.

=== 28 January ===
List of shipwrecks: 28 January 1895
Ship	State	Description
L'Amerique	France	During a voyage from Saint-Nazaire, France, to Savanilla and Colón, Colombia, with general cargo, the 4,584-gross register ton sidewheel paddle steamer was wrecked at Savanilla.

=== 29 January ===
List of shipwrecks: 29 January 1895
Ship	State	Description
Cyclone	United States	The steamer burned to the water's edge at La Camas, Washington.

=== 30 January ===
List of shipwrecks: 30 January 1895
Ship	State	Description
Elbe	Germany	The steamship collided with the steamer Crathie (United Kingdom) and sank 47 miles (76 km) south-west from the Haaks Lightship (United Kingdom) off Lowestoft in 17 to 20 fathoms (102 to 120 ft; 31 to 37 m) of water, and the trunks of her masts can be seen above water, with the loss of 334 lives. 20 survivors, including 15 crew, were rescued by the fishing smack Wildflower (United Kingdom).

=== Unknown date ===
List of shipwrecks: Unknown date January 1895
Ship	State	Description
Chicora	United States	The passenger-cargo steamer disappeared on Lake Michigan with the loss of all hands.

== February ==
=== 5 February ===
List of shipwrecks: 5 February 1895
Ship	State	Description
J. D. Lawlor	United States	The pilot boat was sunk in a collision with fishing schooner Horace B. Parker (United States) about ten miles (16 km) north of Minot's Ledge Light. Four of five crew killed.
Laiyuan	Imperial Chinese Navy	First Sino-Japanese War: Battle of Weihaiwei: The armored cruiser capsized and sank with the loss of about 170 lives after being torpedoed by the torpedo boat Kotaka (Imperial Japanese Navy) at Weihaiwei, China.

=== 6 February ===
List of shipwrecks: 6 February 1895
Ship	State	Description
Gypsey	United States	The laid up launch was destroyed by fire, probably at new London, Connecticut. Believed to be arson.
H. S. Van Samford	United States	The barge, under the tow of the tugboat Aries (United States), suddenly foundered six miles (9.7 km) west of Saybrook Breakwater Light and north of Cornfield Shoals in Long Island Sound in 10 fathoms (60 ft; 18 m) of water. Her cook drowned and her captain died after rescue by Aries. Four others survived.

=== 7 February ===
List of shipwrecks: 7 February 1895
Ship	State	Description
Chindwin	United Kingdom	The 100-foot (30 m), 127-ton steam trawler was wrecked on rocks in a snowstorm in Salt Pan Bay (Pans Bay), seven miles (11 km) south from Corsewall, or Portpatrick, Rinns of Galloway around midnight on 6/7 February. The crew made it to shore on 7 February. The wreck was stripped and demolished in place during the summer.
George H. Warren	United States	The pilot boat from New York went missing just before the great blizzard. She had six pilots on board, a boatkeeper, cook, and two seamen.
Jingyuen	Imperial Chinese Navy	First Sino-Japanese War: Battle of Weihaiwei: The armoured cruiser exploded and sank at her anchorage at Weihaiwei, China, after taking several hits from coastal artillery batteries that Imperial Japanese Army forces had captured.
Mary McNeill	United States	The tugboat sprung a leak in West Farms Creek and was run onto a mud bank to prevent sinking. She was carried off the mud bank by an ice flow to the Westchester side where she rolled over and burned. Her crew made it ashore across the ice.

=== 8 February ===
List of shipwrecks: 8 February 1895
Ship	State	Description
Marblehead	United States	February gale: The fishing schooner parted her anchor chain and went ashore at Fort Point, Boston, a total loss. The crew were saved.
Louis V. Place	United States	The schooner carrying coal from Baltimore to New York ran around on a sand bar close to the Lone Hill Life-Saving Station. Due to conditions, after 40 hours hanging in the rigging two of the crew of six were rescued, although only one survived.

=== 9 February ===
List of shipwrecks: 9 February 1895
Ship	State	Description
Clara F. Friend	United States	The schooner was wrecked on Eastern Head, near the entrance to the harbor of Liverpool, Nova Scotia in a storm. Lost with all 12 crew.
Sentinel	United States	The steamer caught fire and burned to the waters edge while lying at Cairo, Illinois.

=== 10 February ===
List of shipwrecks: 10 February 1895
Ship	State	Description
Blue Bell	United Kingdom	The Great Storm of 10 February 1895: The smack sank on North Wharf Bank with the loss of two crew.
Dingyuan	Imperial Chinese Navy	First Sino-Japanese War: Battle of Weihaiwei: The turret ship was scuttled off Liugong Island, China.
Sarah	United Kingdom	The Great Storm of 10 February 1895: The smack sank on Salthouse Bank with the loss of two crew.
School Girl	United Kingdom	The Great Storm of 10 February 1895: The smack sank on Crusader Bank with the loss of two crew.
Two Sisters	United Kingdom	The Great Storm of 10 February 1895: The smack sank off Central Pier, Blackpool with the loss of two crew.
Vancouver	United States	The ferry broke her shaft in a heavy gale and collided with a snag, sinking in eight feet (2.4 m) of water.
Volunteer	United Kingdom	The Great Storm of 10 February 1895: The prawner sank off South Shore, Blackpool. Both crewmen made it to shore.

=== 14 February ===
List of shipwrecks: 14 February 1895
Ship	State	Description
L. H. Sargent	United States	The steamer, laid up after being seized by the United States Marshal Service, sprung a leak and sank at Vicksburg, Mississippi.
Northern Pacific	United States	The laid up steamer was sunk by ice at Kleinston, Mississippi. Later raised.

=== 15 February ===
List of shipwrecks: 15 February 1895
Ship	State	Description
Lady of the Lake	United States	The paddlewheel passenger steamer was destroyed by fire at dock in Washington, D.C., a total loss.

=== 18 February ===
List of shipwrecks: 18 February 1895
Ship	State	Description
Vanguard	United States	The steamer sank in 35 feet (11 m) of water at Cairo, Illinois. Raised, repaired and returned to service.

=== 19 February ===
List of shipwrecks: 19 February 1895
Ship	State	Description
William G. Hewes	United States	The steamer was wrecked in a gale on Colorado Reef off the coast of Cuba.

=== 24 February ===
List of shipwrecks: 24 February 1895
Ship	State	Description
Silver Ware	United States	The passenger steamer was sunk by ice at Vanceburg, Kentucky. Raised on 1 March, taken to Cincinnati and repaired.
Susie Brown	United States	The ferry struck a snag and sank in the Scioto River. Raised, rebuilt and returned to service as Portsmouth.

=== 26 February ===
List of shipwrecks: 26 February 1895
Ship	State	Description
J. C. Abbot	United States	The ferry was sunk by ice at dock at Madison, Indiana, a total loss.

=== 28 February ===
List of shipwrecks: 28 February 1895
Ship	State	Description
Charley Hook	United States	The steamer was sunk by ice in the Ohio River at Babs Island. Raised and repaired.
Pacific	United States	The steamer was sunk by ice in the Ohio River opposite Walkers Landing near Wellsville, Ohio. Raised and repaired.

=== Unknown date ===
List of shipwrecks: Unknown date February 1895
Ship	State	Description
Mary S. Hontvet	United States	The fishing schooner sank on the Georges Bank in the February gale. Lost with all 13 crew.
Mildred V. Lee	United States	The fishing schooner sank on the Georges Bank in the February gale. Lost with all 16 hands.
Samuel V. Colby	United States	The fishing schooner sank returning to Gloucester, Massachusetts from Fortune Bay in a gale in early February. Lost with all eight crew.

== March ==
=== 1 March ===
List of shipwrecks: 1 March 1895
Ship	State	Description
Marcus Collins	United States	The steamer burned and sank between Trinity, Louisiana and Tensas Lake, a total loss.
Nat. F. Dortch	United States	The steamer struck a snag and sank near Cotton Point Landing, Louisiana in Ninock Lake, or at Coon Point, Louisiana in the Red River, a total loss. Her bell and boiler were later salvaged.
Nora	United States	The steamer burned and sank at New Iberia, Louisiana. Raised and repaired. One of her firemen was killed.

=== 3 March ===
List of shipwrecks: 3 March 1895
Ship	State	Description
Laura Blanks	United States	The steamer burned and sank between Trinity, Louisiana and Floyd, Louisiana, a total loss. Her master's son died.

=== 6 March ===
List of shipwrecks: 6 March 1895
Ship	State	Description
Evangel	United States	The steamer filled through a siphon pipe and sank at dock at Port Angeles, Washington.

=== 7 March ===
List of shipwrecks: 7 March 1895
Ship	State	Description
Fjeld	Norway	The sailing ship was destroyed by fire on a voyage from Grimsby to San Diego.

=== 8 March ===
List of shipwrecks: 8 March 1895
Ship	State	Description
Longfellow	United States	The passenger steamer struck a pier of the Chesapeake and Ohio Railway Bridge in Cincinnati, she broke in two and sank, a total loss. Seven killed.
Rosedale	United States	The steamer struck a rock in the "Rock Channel" and sank in six feet (1.8 m) of water in the Wabash River in Grand Chain. Part of her cargo was salvaged. One crewman drowned. Raised and repaired. Back in service by late August.

=== 9 March ===
List of shipwrecks: 9 March 1895
Ship	State	Description
Anna B. Adams	United States	The steamer struck a snag and sank at Thorn Reach, Louisiana in the Red River. Later raised. Back in service by May.
Gamma	United States	The steamer struck a snag and sank at Brown's Landing, Louisiana in the Red River, a total loss.
Reina Regente	Spanish Navy	The Reina Regente-class protected cruiser foundered in the Bay of Cádiz with the loss of all 420 crew.

=== 10 March ===
List of shipwrecks: 10 March 1895
Ship	State	Description
Myrtle	United States	The steamer caught fire and burned in the White River 25 miles (40 km) above Newport, Arkansas near Arnold's Ferry, a total loss.

=== 12 March ===
List of shipwrecks: 12 March 1895
Ship	State	Description
F. W. Vosburgh	United States	The tugboat struck Romer Shoal and sank in a heavy snowstorm.

=== 13 March ===
List of shipwrecks: 13 March 1895
Ship	State	Description
N. B. Starbuck	United States	The tugboat, while assisting Senica, got caught in her suction, listed, filled with water, and sank in the East River off Pier 17. A pilot was killed.

=== 17 March ===
List of shipwrecks: 17 March 1895
Ship	State	Description
Helen Vaughan	United States	The steamer burned at White's Ferry, Louisiana near the mouth of Bayou D'Arbonne, a total loss.

=== 19 March ===
List of shipwrecks: 19 March 1895
Ship	State	Description
Nubia	United Kingdom	The passenger-cargo steamer ran aground at Aden during her maiden voyage. She was refloated, repaired, and returned to service.

=== 21 March ===
List of shipwrecks: 21 March 1895
Ship	State	Description
Ambassadrice	France	En route from St Malo for Newfoundland for cod the sailing vessel had a crew of 7 and 90 male passengers. It ran onto rocks on the south coast of Guernsey (Channel Islands) in fog and foundered close to shore. All managed to climb to the top of the cliffs safely apart from one elderly man who slipped and fell to his death.

=== 23 March ===
List of shipwrecks: 23 March 1895
Ship	State	Description
Mary Ann	United Kingdom	The ship got into difficulties off Cardigan Island, Cardiganshire. Her two crew were rescued by Lizzie & Charles Leigh Clare ( Royal National Lifeboat Institution).

=== 24 March ===
List of shipwrecks: 24 March 1895
Ship	State	Description
Saml. Winpenny	United States	The steamer backed into a rock lighter and sank in the Ashley River at Charleston, South Carolina.

=== 25 March ===
List of shipwrecks: 25 March 1895
Ship	State	Description
Acorn	United States	The ferry burned and sank at Middleport, Ohio, a total loss.

=== 26 March ===
List of shipwrecks: 26 March 1895
Ship	State	Description
Lora	United States	The steamer foundered at Monroe, Louisiana. Later raised.

=== 27 March ===
List of shipwrecks: 27 March 1895
Ship	State	Description
Ethel	United States	The launch was wrecked crossing the bar at Lake Worth, Florida.

=== 28 March ===
List of shipwrecks: 28 March 1895
Ship	State	Description
EG 4 Drie Gezusters	Netherlands	The fishing Bomschuit (pink) drifted up the Texelstroom navigation channel during a storm. During a rescue operation all persons on board were rescued by Blazer TX 119 Bertha.
Mary H. Packer	United States	The tug sprung a leak and sank off Red Hook, Brooklyn. most of crew rescued by Magenta, a deck hand drowned. Apparently raised, repaired and back in service by December 1895.
Ralph E. Warner	United States	The steamer caught fire and burned in the White River near Hess Landing, Arkansas, a total loss.
Saintonge	France	The vessel ran aground, approximately 200 yd (183 m) from the shore in calm weather on rocks in Boskenna Bay, 5 miles (8.0 km) to the west of Penzance, Cornwall. She was finally abandoned on 1 April with all the crew and some of the cargo saved.

=== 29 March ===
List of shipwrecks: 29 March 1895
Ship	State	Description
Alvah	United Kingdom	The steamer was damaged in a collision with Brinkburn (United Kingdom) in the Straits of Messina off Cannitello. She was beached to prevent sinking, but was wrecked, a total loss.

=== 30 March ===
List of shipwrecks: 30 March 1895
Ship	State	Description
Welcome	United States	The steamer was sunk in a collision with Perfection (United States) in the Chicago River.

== April ==
=== 2 April ===
List of shipwrecks: 2 April 1895
Ship	State	Description
Buckeye	United States	The steamer was struck by a heavy squall in Bellingham Bay and thrown on its beams ends and was wrecked. One passenger died of exposure.
W. A. Waters	United States	The bugeye was struck by the tug Game Cock (United States) and sank in Baltimore Harbor.

=== 3 April ===
List of shipwrecks: 3 April 1895
Ship	State	Description
Iron Queen	United States	The ferry burned and sank at Gallipolis, Ohio, a total loss. 35 passengers and crew made it to shore, one stewardess drowned.

=== 6 April ===
List of shipwrecks: 6 April 1895
Ship	State	Description
I. T. Rhea	United States	The steamer was blown in a storm into Brooks Bluff in the Cumberland River knocking a hole in her starboard side, causing her to sink in 30 feet (9.1 m) of water.

=== 7 April ===
List of shipwrecks: 7 April 1895
Ship	State	Description
Josiah R. Smith	United States	The schooner was sunk in a collision with the barge Lone Star in tow by Orion (both United States) four miles (6.4 km) off Gay Head in thick fog. The crew were rescued by Lone Star.

=== 8 April ===
List of shipwrecks: 8 April 1895
Ship	State	Description
Unknown barges	United States	Two barges, under tow by Thomas A. Bain (United States), broke loose in a storm off Cape Charles. They eventually washed ashore. One was refloated, the other was a total loss.

=== 9 April ===
List of shipwrecks: 9 April 1895
Ship	State	Description
Lord Spencer	United Kingdom	The steamer foundered on a voyage from San Francisco, California, United States to Queenstown, Ireland.

=== 10 April ===
List of shipwrecks: 10 April 1895
Ship	State	Description
Lizzie W. Hannum	United States	The schooner was wrecked on Great Ledge in Buzzards Bay.

=== 13 April ===
List of shipwrecks: 13 April 1895
Ship	State	Description
Nora	Sweden	The steamer struck a sunken wreck crossing the Bar at Shanghai, China and was wrecked.

=== 14 April ===
List of shipwrecks: 14 April 1895
Ship	State	Description
Kodiak	United States	Great Easter Gale of 1895: During a voyage in the District of Alaska from Kodiak to Ajaktalik with one passenger, eight crewmen, and a 40-ton cargo of lumber, furs, and general merchandise on board, the 102.89-ton, 93-foot (28.3 m) schooner was wrecked during a gale on a sandspit at the southeastern tip of Geese Island (56°44′N 153°53′W) in the Kodiak Archipelago. All aboard survived.
Walter A. Earle	Canada	Great Easter Gale of 1895: While sealing off Icy Bay in the District of Alaska, the 71-ton schooner lost her rudder and capsized during a gale in the Gulf of Alaska off Cape Saint Elias on the southwest end of Kayak Island with the loss of her entire crew of 32. Her overturned hull drifted into Afognak Bay (58°02′30″N 152°45′00″W) on Kodiak Island several weeks later with the bodies of many of her crew inside it.

=== 20 April ===
List of shipwrecks: 20 April 1895
Ship	State	Description
Wasp	United Kingdom	The tug was run down and sunk in the Bristol Channel by Severn (United Kingdom) with the loss of all four people on board. The wreck was later raised and beached.

=== 22 April ===
List of shipwrecks: 22 April 1895
Ship	State	Description
Unknown barges	United States	The tow steamer I. N. Bunton (United States) struck a pier of the Kenova Bridge in Cincinnati, resulting in four barges sinking.
Wyandot	United States	The steamer struck a stump and sank in the Duck River three miles (4.8 km) above the mouth in eight feet (2.4 m) of water.

=== 24 April ===
List of shipwrecks: 24 April 1895
Ship	State	Description
C. G. White	United States	Great Easter Gale of 1895: The 73.51-net register ton, 81.5-foot (24.8 m) schooner was disabled at sea in a gale and snowstorm and blown before the wind until she was wrecked on a submerged reef in the Trinity Islands (56°50′N 154°10′W) in the District of Alaska's Kodiak Archipelago southwest of Kodiak Island. Of her crew of at least 28, three died trying to reach shore and eight more died ashore prior to rescue. Confusingly, various press reports of 1895 in combination list up to 20 survivors, raising the possibility that her crew was as large as 31.

=== 27 April ===
List of shipwrecks: 27 April 1895
Ship	State	Description
A. Everett	United States	The steamer foundered in Saginaw Bay, Lake Huron.
Sadie Shepherd	United States	The steamer sprung a leak and sank on Lake Erie near Turtle Island. Her cook drowned.

== May ==
=== 1 May ===
List of shipwrecks: 1 May 1895
Ship	State	Description
J. H. Johnson	United States	The steamer struck a rock in Green Bay near Horseshoe Island and was wrecked, a total loss.
Reindeer	United States	The schooner was wrecked in a gale near the Black River. She was not considered worth saving and was towed into shoal water and abandoned.

=== 2 May ===
List of shipwrecks: 2 May 1895
Ship	State	Description
S. R. Smith	United States	The tug was struck by a scow, under tow by Wm. E. Chapman (United States), in the East River off Pier 47. She was forced under, bow first, rolling onto her port side, filling with water and sank.

=== 3 May ===
List of shipwrecks: 3 May 1895
Ship	State	Description
E. B. Wheelock	United States	The steamer struck an obstruction and sank at Snaggy Point, Louisiana in the Red River, a total loss.

=== 4 May ===
List of shipwrecks: 4 May 1895
Ship	State	Description
Guide	United States	The steamer burned at Pier 6, Oswego, New York, a total loss.

=== 5 May ===
List of shipwrecks: 5 May 1895
Ship	State	Description
L. D. Davis	United States	The tow steamer was destroyed by fire at Ashtabula, Ohio, a total loss.

=== 7 May ===
List of shipwrecks: 7 May 1895
Ship	State	Description
Maud	United States	The tug was capsized in the harbor of Norfolk, Virginia by the suction of New York (United States).

=== 10 May ===
List of shipwrecks: 10 May 1895
Ship	State	Description
Cayuga	United States	The steamer sank in a collision with Joseph L. Hurd (United States) in dense fog in Lake Michigan/Straits of Mackinac near the Waugoshance Light in 14–15 fathoms (84–90 ft; 26–27 m) of water (45°43′N 85°11′W). Joseph L. Hurd's cook drowned.

=== 11 May ===
List of shipwrecks: 11 May 1895
Ship	State	Description
O. J. Walker	United States	Carrying a cargo of bricks and tiles, the 86-foot (26 m) schooner-rigged canal boat sank during a storm without loss of life in 65 feet (20 m) of water in Lake Champlain, 0.75 nautical miles (1.4 km; 0.9 mi) west of the north end of the breakwater at Burlington, Vermont, at 44°28.72′N 073°14.44′W.
Rob Roy	United States	The tow steamer filled with water and sank at dock at the foot of Vine Street, Cincinnati.

=== 12 May ===
List of shipwrecks: 12 May 1895
Ship	State	Description
City of Chartiers	United States	The steamer burned to the waterline while lying at the bank near Ironton, Ohio.

=== 13 May ===
List of shipwrecks: 13 May 1895
Ship	State	Description
West Side	United States	The fishing schooner was wrecked on Duck Rock off Boothbay, Maine. The crew was saved. The wreck was later sold.

=== 14 May ===
List of shipwrecks: 14 May 1895
Ship	State	Description
Katie Voight	United States	The steamer struck a sunken scow in the Pettys Island Cut and sank. Raised, repaired and back in service by mid June.

=== 21 May ===
List of shipwrecks: 21 May 1895
Ship	State	Description
Carrie E. Long	United States	The barque was lost to fire in the Atlantic Ocean when struck by lightning 10 miles (16 km) west of Gun Cay, the Bahamas. Her captain, first mate and two crewmen were killed in the lightning strike. The rest of the crew was rescued from Gun Cay by Havana (United States).

=== 27 May ===
List of shipwrecks: 27 May 1895
Ship	State	Description
Colima	United States	The steamer sank in a violent gale 40 miles (64 km) south of Manzanillo, Colima. Eighty-five passengers and 68 crew died, 12 crew and 27 passengers survived, some made it to shore, others were rescued by San Juan (United States).

=== 29 May ===
List of shipwrecks: 29 May 1895
Ship	State	Description
H. E. Runnells	United States	The steamer caught fire on Lake Erie and was towed to Ashtabula, Ohio where she sank. Raised in July and taken to Port Huron, Michigan where she was repaired and returned to service.
Jack	Canada	The steamer was damaged in a collision with Norman (United States) in dense fog off Presque Isle, off the Menominee River, rapidly filled and became waterlogged. She would have sunk except for the buoyancy of her cargo of lumber. She sank next day at Presque Isle after the lumber lost its buoyancy. The crew were rescued by the steam barge Sicken. Raised, repaired, and returned to service. Renamed Bothnia at some point.
Norman	United States	The steamer was sunk in a collision with Jack (Canada) in dense fog off Presque Isle, off the Menominee River in 300 feet (91 m) of water. Two crewmen and wife of another crewman drowned. Survivors rescued by the steam barge Sicken.
S. P. Pond	United States	The steamer caught fire and burned in the White River opposite Newport, Arkansas, a total loss.

== June ==
=== 2 June ===
List of shipwrecks: 2 June 1895
Ship	State	Description
Osceola	United States	The steamer burned in the Ocklawaha River near Eureka, Florida, a total loss.

=== 5 June ===
List of shipwrecks: 5 June 1895
Ship	State	Description
J. Everson	United States	The tug had passed a line to the steam barge I. Watson Stephenson (United States) in preparation for towing her through the Sturgeon Bay Ship Canal. When I. Watson Stephenson crossed J. Everson's bow to pass lines to the other side, she was struck, rolled over, filled and sank five miles (8.0 km) northeast of Algoma, Wisconsin in 50 feet (15 m) of water. One crewman below decks drowned. The wreck was located in September 2024.

=== 6 June ===
List of shipwrecks: 6 June 1895
Ship	State	Description
Gitana	United States	The steamer foundered in a severe storm in Lake Ontario between Oswego, New York and Alexander Bay. Lost with all three hands.

=== 8 June ===
List of shipwrecks: 8 June 1895
Ship	State	Description
T. D. Dale	United States	The passenger steamer struck an obstruction and sank near Lock No. 8 in the Great Kanawha River in eight feet (2.4 m) of water. Raised and repaired.

=== 11 June ===
List of shipwrecks: 11 June 1895
Ship	State	Description
Olinda	Portugal	During a voyage from New York City to Fall River, Massachusetts, the 250-foot (76 m), 1,479-gross register ton cargo ship was wrecked in fog on Fisher's Island, New York, at the eastern end of Long Island Sound without loss of life. Her wreck sank in 20 feet (6 m) of water.

=== 12 June ===
List of shipwrecks: 12 June 1895
Ship	State	Description
Saint Pancras	United Kingdom	The cargo ship was wrecked on the Samarang Bank. She was on a voyage from Labuan, Philippines to Marseille, Bouches-du-Rhône, France.

=== 17 June ===
List of shipwrecks: 17 June 1895
Ship	State	Description
Jumbo	United States	The schooner sank at Newburyport, Massachusetts. Her captain and one crewman died.

=== 18 June ===
List of shipwrecks: 18 June 1895
Ship	State	Description
James	United States	The tug sprang a leak at Cramp Shipbuilding, Philadelphia and sank.

=== 20 June ===
List of shipwrecks: 21 June 1895
Ship	State	Description
Potomac	United States	The steamer was destroyed by fire at the mouth of St. Clements Bay.

=== 21 June ===
List of shipwrecks: 21 June 1895
Ship	State	Description
Anna M. Pence	United States	The steamer burned near Point Lowell in Puget Sound, a total loss. Her crew escaped to a scow she was towing, except for her cook who drowned.
Diana	United Kingdom	The cross-Channel mail steamer was wrecked in fog on Cap de la Hague. She was on a voyage from St Malo, France to Southampton, England. Passengers and crew all rescued.
St. Peter	United States	The laid up steamer was destroyed by fire at Handsboro, Mississippi, a total loss.

== July ==
=== 2 July ===
List of shipwrecks: 2 July 1895
Ship	State	Description
Alice	United States	The steamer sank at dock at Falmouth, Maine.
J. J. Odil	United States	The steamer struck a dredge cut and sank in the Illinois River at Bloom's Landing, Illinois. Later raised.
Lincoln	United States	The steamer was destroyed by fire from an exploding lamp in the engine room at dock at Barren Island, Brooklyn.

=== 5 July ===
List of shipwrecks: 5 July 1895
Ship	State	Description
Lady Lee	United States	The steamer struck an obstruction and sank at Island No. 40, a total loss. Three crew and two passengers killed.
Portland	United States	The steamer, while at anchor near Dundas Island, British Columbia, grounded on a rock and became a total loss.

=== 7 July ===
List of shipwrecks: 7 July 1895
Ship	State	Description
Annie May	United States	The steam launch was driven onto the beach and destroyed at Cape Karluk (57°35′10″N 154°30′50″W) on the Shelikof Strait coast of the District of Alaska's Kodiak Island during a storm. She became a total loss.
Mexico	United Kingdom	The steamer was wrecked near the Belle Isle Lighthouse while en route from Montreal to Bristol. She was carrying 900 sheep, 200 cattle and a general cargo. The crew was saved but the wreck was plundered and set alight.
Raphael	United States	While anchored off Karluk, District of Alaska, with 20 crewmen and a cargo of 7,117 cases of salmon on board, the 1,542-gross register ton, 220-foot (67.1 m) wooden ship was washed ashore during a storm and wrecked without loss of life in Tanglefoot Bay (57°34′30″N 154°29′30″W) on the coast of Southcentral Alaska.

=== 8 July ===
List of shipwrecks: 8 July 1895
Ship	State	Description
Innovator	United States	The dredge struck an obstruction and sank in 3 feet of water near Caseyville, Kentucky. Raised and repaired.

=== 9 July ===
List of shipwrecks: 9 July 1895
Ship	State	Description
Hilaria	United Kingdom	One died when the ship caught fire and sank in Port Phillip, near Melbourne. She was carrying a general cargo and rosin.
Volurous	Canada	The schooner collided near Beaver Light, Nova Scotia. She was out of White Head, Nova Scotia.

=== 10 July ===
List of shipwrecks: 10 July 1895
Ship	State	Description
Ben Harrison	United States	The lighter struck a rock and sank in the Merrimac River. Raised and repaired.
Uhlan	United Kingdom	The vessel was wrecked off Heligoland.

=== 11 July ===
List of shipwrecks: 11 July 1895
Ship	State	Description
Birkhall	United Kingdom	The vessel was sunk in a collision with Wantai (Imperial Chinese Navy) on the seaward side of the Woosung bar.

=== 12 July ===
List of shipwrecks: 12 July 1895
Ship	State	Description
Prince Oscar	United Kingdom	The ship collided with another vessel and sank with the loss of all hands off the coast of Brazil.

=== 15 July ===
List of shipwrecks: 15 July 1895
Ship	State	Description
Hebe	Sweden	The barquentine was wrecked at Little Curacao Island.

=== 16 July ===
List of shipwrecks: 16 July 1895
Ship	State	Description
Nyanza	United States	The steamer was sunk in a collision with Northern King (United States) in the Hay Lake Channel, Sault Ste. Marie River. Raised, taken to Duluth ad repaired.
Uncle Billy	United States	The steamer struck an obstruction and sank 10 miles (16 km) above the Mouth of Black Fish Bayou in the St. Francis River, a total loss. Tree crew and two passengers killed.

=== 17 July ===
List of shipwrecks: 17 July 1895
Ship	State	Description
W. H. Miller	United States	Carrying 12 crewmen, three passengers, and a cargo of 300 tons of coal and general merchandise, the 265.5-ton, 122.6-foot (37.4 m) brig dragged her anchors during a gale and was stranded without loss of life in the harbor at Port Clarence, District of Alaska, becoming a total loss.

=== 18 July ===
List of shipwrecks: 18 July 1895
Ship	State	Description
Hibernia	United Kingdom	The 83-gross register ton ketch was in a collision and wrecked off Heligoland.

=== 19 July ===
List of shipwrecks: 19 July 1895
Ship	State	Description
Sankai Maru	Japan	The steam cargo ship ran aground on Shosei Island.

=== 20 July ===
List of shipwrecks: 20 July 1895
Ship	State	Description
Westella	United Kingdom	During a voyage in ballast between Stockholm and Härnösand, Sweden, the Jackson & Beaumont-owned steamer was in a collision and sank in the Baltic Sea 8 nautical miles (15 km) south-southeast of Finngrundet.

=== 21 July ===
List of shipwrecks: 21 July 1895
Ship	State	Description
Maria P	Italy	The passenger-cargo ship was involved in a collision in the Gulf of Spezia, off the Italian coast with 148 lives lost. She was en route from Naples to Genoa with a general cargo.

=== 23 July ===
List of shipwrecks: 23 July 1895
Ship	State	Description
Gen. A. E. Burnside	United States	The tug burned and sank off Stamford, Connecticut, a total loss.
Only Son	United States	The schooner was sunk in a collision with the yacht Neaira (United States) off Astoria, Queens in the East River. Her crew was rescued by Neaira

=== 24 July ===
List of shipwrecks: 24 July 1895
Ship	State	Description
Granby	United Kingdom	The steamer was wrecked on the coast of Brazil while on a voyage in ballast from Imbituba, Brazil, to Buenos Aires, Argentina.
Unique	United Kingdom	The steamer ran aground in the Bass Strait on the coast of Victoria, Australia.
Ymuiden	Netherlands	The steamer was wrecked off Rotterdam, the Netherlands.

=== 25 July ===
List of shipwrecks: 25 July 1895
Ship	State	Description
Agnes Donald	Queensland	En route in ballast from Thursday Island, Queensland, Australia, to Fremantle, Western Australia, the steamer was lost in the Indian Ocean off Fremantle.
Angelica	United Kingdom	En route from Bordeaux, France, to Barry, Wales, with a cargo of pitwood, the steamer was wrecked off Milford, Wales.
Mogador	United Kingdom	The steamer ran aground on the Hats and Barrell Rocks between Milford and St David's Head, Wales, while carrying coal from Glasgow, Scotland, to Bayonne, France.

=== 26 July ===
List of shipwrecks: 26 July 1895
Ship	State	Description
Condor	Norway	The barque caught fire and was abandoned in the North Sea 50 nautical miles (93 km) east-southeast of Lowestoft, during a voyage from Hull, England, to Pensacola, Florida.

=== 27 July ===
List of shipwrecks: 27 July 1895
Ship	State	Description
Agra	Western Australia	The barque was on a voyage from Fremantle to Bunbury, Western Australia, with a cargo of stock and general goods when she was lost in Koombana Bay near Bunbury.
Cleaveland	United Kingdom	The steamer was on a voyage from London to Cardiff in ballast when she was in collision in the English Channel off Folkestone with the tanker Duffield and sank.
Seagull	Western Australia	The steamer was lost off Garden Island, Western Australia, along with her three crew.

=== 28 July ===
List of shipwrecks: 28 July 1895
Ship	State	Description
Ida	Germany	The cargo ship was carrying sugar, wheat, and general cargo from Danzig, Germany, to London when she ran aground on the Hasborough Sands.
Masonic	United Kingdom	The steam cargo ship was wrecked at Saint Pierre and Miquelon. She was in ballast on a voyage from Swansea, Wales, to Miramichi, New Brunswick, Canada.

=== 29 July ===
List of shipwrecks: 29 July 1895
Ship	State	Description
Haakon Adelsteen	Norway	The steamer ran aground near Santa Catherina, Brazil, during a voyage from La Plata, Argentina, to Rio de Janeiro, Brazil.

=== 31 July ===
List of shipwrecks: 31 July 1895
Ship	State	Description
Benton	United States	The passenger steamer struck a snag and sank in the Missouri River at Arrow Rock, Missouri. Raised and repaired.
Congo	United Kingdom	During a voyage from Antwerp, Belgium, in ballast, the steamer ran aground at Triborka in the White Sea.

=== Unknown date ===
List of shipwrecks: Unknown date in July 1895
Ship	State	Description
Lord Downshire	United Kingdom	The full-rigged ship foundered off the coast of Brazil with the loss of all hands. She was on a voyage from Caleta Buena, Chile to Hamburg, Germany.

== August ==
=== 1 August ===
List of shipwrecks: 1 August 1895
Ship	State	Description
Refuge	United States	The steamer caught fire off Liberty Island. After efforts to put it out failed she was beached on Oyster Island, where she burned to the waterline. Her crew escaped in her boat.

=== 2 August ===
List of shipwrecks: 2 August 1895
Ship	State	Description
Marion	United States	The steamer burned to the waterline and sank at dock at Boothbay Harbor, Maine, a total loss.

=== 4 August ===
List of shipwrecks: 4 August 1895
Ship	State	Description
F. A. Kerker	United States	The tug caught fire at dock at Rikers Island, she burned to the waterline.

=== 5 August ===
List of shipwrecks: 5 August 1895
Ship	State	Description
Big Sandy	United States	The wharf boat caught fire and burned to the waterline/destroyed while at dock at the foot of Broadway, Cincinnati, spreading to other wharf boats and two steamers.
Big Sandy	United States	The steamer burned to the waterline/destroyed while at dock at the foot of Broadway, Cincinnati when the wharf boat Big Sandy caught fire.
Carrollton	United States	The steamer burned to the waterline/destroyed while at dock at the foot of Broadway, Cincinnati when the wharf boat Big Sandy caught fire.
Hiawatha	United States	The steamer was sunk at Columbia, Texas in the Brazos River when dropping river level dropped her on an obstruction piercing her hull.

=== 7 August ===
List of shipwrecks: 7 August 1895
Ship	State	Description
Emma May	Canada	The steamer ran aground off White Point, Nova Scotia, while heading from Chester, Nova Scotia, to Port Matoon, Nova Scotia, Canada.
Harberton	United Kingdom	While en route for Halifax with timber and salted fish, the ship foundered approximately 30 miles (48 km) north-east of Port Morant, Jamaica.

=== 8 August ===
List of shipwrecks: 8 August 1895
Ship	State	Description
Albatros	France	The steamer sank during a storm in the Rance estuary at Point Cancaval, Brittany, France.
Catterthun	New South Wales	The passenger-cargo steamer sank two to three miles (3.2 to 4.8 km) north of Seal Rocks, New South Wales, Australia, after hitting a reef while on a journey from Sydney to Hong Kong with 58 crew members and 22 passengers aboard. Fifty-five died.
Saint Paul	United States	The steamer was wrecked near Point Pinos Lighthouse, California.

=== 9 August ===
List of shipwrecks: 9 August 1895
Ship	State	Description
Britannic	United States	The steamer was sunk in a collision with Russia (United States) in the Detroit River. One of her firemen drowned.

=== 10 August ===
List of shipwrecks: 10 August 1895
Ship	State	Description
Mayhill	United Kingdom	While en route to Geraldton, Western Australia, from Middlesbrough, England with a cargo of railway iron, the barque was wrecked off Point Moore, Western Australia.
Miranda	Belgium	Carrying wool from Australia to Hamburg, Germany, the steamer was wrecked on the Jument rock, near Ushant, France. The lugger Charlotte (flag unknown) picked up the survivors and there was no loss of life.

=== 11 August ===
List of shipwrecks: 11 August 1895
Ship	State	Description
Pan	Denmark	While en route to Ghent, Belgium, from St Petersburg, Russia, with a cargo of barley, flax, and pulpwood, the steamer sank in the Baltic Sea after a collision four miles south of Ystad, Sweden.

=== 12 August ===
List of shipwrecks: 12 August 1895
Ship	State	Description
Soochow	United Kingdom	The passenger and cargo ship ran aground off Chefoo, China, during a voyage from Chinkiang to Chefoo.

=== 14 August ===
List of shipwrecks: 14 August 1895
Ship	State	Description
Dracona	United Kingdom	While en route, and carrying pig iron and coal, from Middlesbrough, England, the steamer ran aground at Fame Point in the Saint Lawrence River, near her destination, Montreal.
S. Shaw	United States	The steamer burned to the waterline at Pier 77, Philadelphia.

=== 16 August ===
List of shipwrecks: 16 August 1895
Ship	State	Description
Wm. Jones	United States	The schooner was sunk in a collision with City of Macon (United States) at Greenwich Pier, Philadelphia.

=== 19 August ===
List of shipwrecks: 19 August 1895
Ship	State	Description
City of Sheffield	United States	The steamer struck an obstruction and sank in shallow water in the Mississippi River near Greenfield, Missouri. Raised and taken to Paducah, Kentucky for repairs.
Lud Keifer	United States	The steamer broke loose from the Monongahela Wharf, Pittsburgh, in a storm. She capsized and was reduced to a wreck. Later broken up. A stewardess died.
Tillie	United States	The steamer was capsized and wrecked at the Tyde Coal Company Wharf, Pittsburgh, in a storm.

=== 20 August ===
List of shipwrecks: 20 August 1895
Ship	State	Description
John D. Scully	United States	The laid up steamer was destroyed by fire at Carrollton, Louisiana.
Maryland	United States	The steamer was dragged down and sunk when an unidentified mud scow she was towing suddenly sank in the Cooper River opposite Charleston, South Carolina. One crewman killed.
Rung Brothers	United States	The 57-foot (17 m) steam yacht was caught in the trough of heavy seas on Lake Erie off Buffalo, New York causing her to careen, fill and sink rapidly. Six passengers killed.

=== 21 August ===
List of shipwrecks: 21 August 1895
Ship	State	Description
Etta Stewart	Canada	Eight people died when the sailing ship was lost off Three Fathom Harbour, Halifax, Nova Scotia, Canada, in a storm.
Seaford	United Kingdom	The Newhaven and Dieppe ferry sank 20 miles (32 km) from Newhaven after a collision with the steamship Lyon. There was no loss of life.

=== 22 August ===
List of shipwrecks: 22 August 1895
Ship	State	Description
Sentinel	Canada	The barque was lost at sea while en route to Buenos Aires from Yarmouth, Nova Scotia, Canada.

=== 24 August ===
List of shipwrecks: 24 August 1895
Ship	State	Description
Clémentine	France	The steamer sank after hitting rocks near Mont Saint-Michel. She was carrying limestone from Regnéville, Normandy to Dahouët, Brittany.

=== 25 August ===
List of shipwrecks: 25 August 1895
Ship	State	Description
Alice	Canada	The steamer ran aground off Seal Island, while en route for Liverpool from Port Medway, Nova Scotia.
Four Sisters	France	The steamer ran aground while en route from St Pierre, Saint Pierre and Miquelon to Sydney, Nova Scotia.
Fredrikka	Norway	The steamer was lost during a storm off Aspy Bay while en route to Baie Verte, New Brunswick, Canada, from Le Havre, Upper Normandy, France.
Morning Light	Canada	The steam schooner was wrecked off Mulgrave Cove while heading to Port Hawkesbury, Nova Scotia from Pictou, Nova Scotia, Canada.
Rosedale	United States	The steamer struck an obstruction and sank in 15 feet (4.6 m) of water in the Ohio River near Shawneetown, Illinois. Total loss.

=== 26 August ===
List of shipwrecks: 26 August 1895
Ship	State	Description
Mildred	United States	The sloop yacht was sunk in a collision with John Endicott (United States) in Boston Harbor.
Morrisania	United States	The steamer was destroyed by fire in drydock in Hoboken, New Jersey.

=== 27 August ===
List of shipwrecks: 27 August 1895
Ship	State	Description
Henrietta	United States	The sailing ship was wrecked in the Kee Chanel on a trip from Yokohama, Japan to Kobe, Japan.
J. M. Clark	United States	The steamer burned to the waterline and sank while tied up at Eight Mile Island near Cheshire, Ohio in the Ohio River.

=== 28 August ===
List of shipwrecks: 28 August 1895
Ship	State	Description
Bawnmore	United Kingdom	The recently converted tanker caught fire and became a total loss after being stranded in Coos Bay, near Bandon. She was heading for Tampico, Tamaulipas, Mexico from Comox.
Duchess of Kent	Western Australia	The steamer was wrecked off Cervantes Island, Western Australia, while en route to Fremantle from Geraldton, Western Australia.
Norman	New South Wales	The schooner was wrecked off Bellambi Reef, New South Wales, while carrying coal from Wollongong to Sydney.
SMS S41	Imperial German Navy	The torpedo boat sank in a storm.
Sea Wo	Western Australia	The small fishing boat was lost off the northwest coast of Western Australia.

=== 30 August ===
List of shipwrecks: 30 August 1895
Ship	State	Description
Ansgarius	United Kingdom	The steamship ran aground on Lowther Rock, South Ronaldsay, Orkney. She was carrying coal from Glasgow to Christiana.

=== 31 August ===
List of shipwrecks: 31 August 1895
Ship	State	Description
K. M. Hutchinson	United States	The steamer caught fire, burned and sank in Lake Poygan four miles (6.4 km) north of Winneconne, Wisconsin. Crew abandoned ship in her lifeboats.
Look Out	Queensland	The barque was on a voyage from Thursday Island, Queensland, when she was wrecked off Dove Island in the Torres Strait.

=== Unknown date ===
List of shipwrecks: 31 August 1895
Ship	State	Description
J. H. Carey	United States	The schooner sailed from Gloucester, Massachusetts on 20 August and vanished, possibly lost in a gale in September. Lost with all 11 hands.

== September ==
=== 1 September ===
List of shipwrecks: 1 September 1895
Ship	State	Description
Marco	United States	The steamer was sunk at Trinity, Louisiana when an attempt to beach her for repairs resulted in the bank giving way causing her to careen and sink, a total loss.
Pathfinder	United States	The tug was sunk in a collision with the tug Medina (United States) in the harbor of Duluth, Minnesota. Later raised. One of her firemen was killed.

=== 2 September ===
List of shipwrecks: 2 September 1895
Ship	State	Description
Geneva Myrtis	Canada	The schooner caught fire and sank off Woods Harbour, Nova Scotia, Canada, while on a voyage from Yarmouth, Nova Scotia, Nova Scotia.

=== 5 September ===
List of shipwrecks: 5 September 1895
Ship	State	Description
Christina A. Forbes	United States	The steamer was destroyed by fire in the Saginaw River.

=== 7 September ===
List of shipwrecks: 7 September 1895
Ship	State	Description
Eagle Point	United States	The steamer struck a timber in a cradle at a shipyard punching a hole in her hull, sinking in seven feet (2.1 m) of water in Dubuque, Iowa. Raised and repaired.
Europa	Germany	Out of Leith, Scotland her cargo of coal caught fire and Europa was abandoned. Her crew was picked up by barque Forfarshire and landed at Talcahuano, Chile.
Parkfield	United Kingdom	The steam-propelled cargo ship ran aground on the island of Gran Canaria at Isleta.

=== 9 September ===
List of shipwrecks: 9 September 1895
Ship	State	Description
Le Glorieux	United Kingdom	The trawler sank six miles (9.7 km) south-east of St Abb's Head, Berwickshire, England, after a collision.

=== 10 September ===
List of shipwrecks: 10 September 1895
Ship	State	Description
Xania	Spain	En route for Antwerp, Belgium from Gävle, Sweden, the steamer sank three miles (4.8 km) south-east of Vlissingen, Netherlands after a collision with Manila. Six people drowned.

=== 11 September ===
List of shipwrecks: 11 September 1895
Ship	State	Description
Glenclune	United Kingdom	The barque was wrecked near Porto Alegre, Brazil while out of Hamburg for Los Angeles. She was carrying cement for the Southern Pacific Railroad Company.
Maid of Oregon	United States	The auxiliary steam schooner/freighter became waterlogged 80 miles (130 km) south east of Cape Flattery on 26 August. She reached Chetgo, Oregon on 8 September and anchored, but was driven ashore in a strong gale on 11 September, a total loss.
Wm. McAvoy	United States	The steamer was sunk in a collision with steamer Lightning (United States) off the American Dredging Company dock, Camden, New Jersey. One of her firemen was scalded.

=== 12 September ===
List of shipwrecks: 12 September 1895
Ship	State	Description
Reindeer	United States	The steamer struck a snag just below the mouth of the Wisconsin River sinking in six feet (1.8 m) of water. Raised and repaired.

=== 13 September ===
List of shipwrecks: 13 September 1895
Ship	State	Description
Narragansett	United States	The tug was sunk in a collision with the tug Mercury (United States) off Pier 3 in the East River.

=== 14 September ===
List of shipwrecks: 14 September 1895
Ship	State	Description
Vandora	United Kingdom	The steamship was carrying coal from Maryport, England and ran aground near her destination of Ballyshannon, Ireland.

=== 16 September ===
List of shipwrecks: 16 September 1895
Ship	State	Description
City of Calcutta	United Kingdom	While en route from Huanillos for London with guano, the barque was abandoned off Staten Island, Argentina. She was driven ashore and wrecked the next day.

=== 17 September ===
List of shipwrecks: 17 September 1895
Ship	State	Description
Mascot	United States	The steamer burned in Wassaw Sound, Georgia, a total loss.

=== 18 September ===
List of shipwrecks: 18 September 1895
Ship	State	Description
A. Saltzman	United States	The steamer sprang a leak and sank lying overnight at Judsonia, Arkansas in the Little Red River. Raised and repaired.
Sánchez Barcáiztegui	Spanish Navy	The screw sloop-of-war sank with the loss of 31 lives off Morro Castle at the entrance to Havana Bay off Cuba after colliding with the cargo ship Mortera (Spain).
St. Lawrence	United States	The steamer while at dock at the foot of Niagara Street, Cincinnati, blew onto a sunken wreck and sank, a total loss.

=== 19 September ===
List of shipwrecks: 19 September 1895
Ship	State	Description
Lottie K. Friend	United States	The schooner was sunk in a collision with schooner Sarah J. Lawson (United States) in Delaware Bay.

=== 20 September ===
List of shipwrecks: 20 September 1895
Ship	State	Description
City of Vivay	United States	The steamer struck an obstruction crossing Craigs Bar and sank in four feet (1.2 m) of water. Raised, taken to Cincinnati and repaired.
James Baird	United States	The steamer burned to the waterline at Centerton, New Jersey.
Tom Ross	United States	The steamer sprung a leak and sank at dock. She was raised and taken to Madison, Indiana, where she was re-hulled.

=== 24 September ===
List of shipwrecks: 24 September 1895
Ship	State	Description
Wm. Alexander	United States	The steamer was destroyed by fire at Colona's railway, Norfolk, Virginia.

=== 26 September ===
List of shipwrecks: 26 September 1895
Ship	State	Description
Glen Iris	United States	The tug ran aground on dumped material in the Imbuck Dumping Grounds, she rolled and filled through her coal hatches.
Montana	United States	The steamer struck a snag and sank at the entrance to the Portage Lake Ship Canal in Lake Superior in a gale. Raised and repaired.
Reliance	United States	The steamer sprung a leak over night and sank in 16 feet (4.9 m) of water at Higginsport, Ohio, a total loss.

=== 27 September ===
List of shipwrecks: 27 September 1895
Ship	State	Description
Crystal	United States	During a voyage from Kodiak on Kodiak Island to Seattle, Washington, with seven passengers, four crewmen, and a 10-ton cargo of cod aboard, the 32.52-ton, 48.6-foot (14.8 m) schooner was wrecked during a gale on the east shore of Yakutat Bay (55°27′20″N 131°29′15″W) on the south-central coast of the District of Alaska about 16 miles (26 km) north of Yakutat without loss of life. Her wreck was sold.
Louise	United States	The steamer was destroyed by fire at dock over night at Petersburg, Virginia.
Mauranger	Norway	The vessel foundered off Cape San Antonio, Cuba, while on a voyage in ballast from Maracaibo, Venezuela, to Laguna de Términos, Mexico.

=== 28 September ===
List of shipwrecks: 28 September 1895
Ship	State	Description
Humboldt	United States	The steamer was wrecked in thick fog on Point Gorda, California, a total loss. Crew and passengers abandoned ship in her lifeboats.
Robert L. Fryer	United States	The steamer was sunk in a collision with Corsica (United States) in 23 feet (7.0 m) of water in Hay Lake, Sault Ste. Marie River. Later raised.

=== 29 September ===
List of shipwrecks: 29 September 1895
Ship	State	Description
Charles J. Kershaw	United States	The steam barge was wrecked on Chocolay Reef near the mouth of the Chocolay River, East Marquette, Michigan in a gale when she lost power after a steam pipe valve burst, breaking in two. Her crew of 13 made in to shore. In 1900 a wrecker salvaged her boiler and other machinery.
Cristóbal Colón	Spanish Navy	The Velasco-class unprotected cruiser was wrecked on Colorado Reef off northwestern Cuba near Mantua during a hurricane without loss of life. Her wreck was broke up on 1 October.
George S. Rieman	United States	The steamer sank at dock in Baltimore due to an open seacock. Later raised.
Henry A. Kent	United States	The schooner barge went ashore near the Mouth of the Chocolay River, East Marquette, Michigan in a gale after her tow Charles J. Kershaw (United States) lost power. Her crew walked to shore. Refloated on 13 May 1896 and taken to Cleveland for repairs and returned to service.
Lena Archer	United States	The steamer sank at dock at Hawsville, Kentucky on the Ohio River due to swells caused by high winds.
Margaret	United States	The steamer went ashore in a storm and was wrecked three miles (4.8 km) west of Cape Henry Lighthouse.
Moonlight	United States	The schooner barge went ashore near the Mouth of the Chocolay River, East Marquette, Michigan in a gale after her tow Charles J. Kershaw (United States) lost power. Her crew walked to shore. Refloated on 13 May 1896 and taken to Cleveland for repairs and returned to service.
R. J. Henry	United States	The barge went to pieces on rocks near Sault Ste. Marie, Michigan in a gale.
Wallachia	United Kingdom	The cargo vessel sank after a collision with a Norwegian steamship in the Firth of Clyde. Her wreckage was discovered more than 80 years later.

=== Unknown date ===
List of shipwrecks: Unknown September 1895
Ship	State	Description
J. H. Carey	United States	The schooner sailed from Gloucester, Massachusetts on 20 August and vanished, possibly lost in a gale in September. Lost with all 11 hands.
Mark Hopkins	United States	On 23 or 27 September the steamer was sunk in a collision with Vanderbilt (United States) in Mud Lake, or Hay Lake, Sault Ste. Marie River. Raised in July 1896, taken to Marine City, Michigan and repaired.

== October ==
=== 1 October ===
List of shipwrecks: 1 October 1895
Ship	State	Description
Maria	United Kingdom	The pilot cutter collided with the pilot cutter Smiling Morn (United Kingdom) in the Bristol Channel off Worms Head, Glamorgan, Wales, and sank. Her crew survived.
Smiling Morn	United Kingdom	The pilot cutter collided with the pilot cutter Maria (United Kingdom) in the Bristol Channel off Worms Head, Glamorgan, Wales, and sank. Her crew survived.

=== 2 October ===
List of shipwrecks: 2 October 1895
Ship	State	Description
Llanisley	United Kingdom	The schooner foundered in the Bristol Channel off Lundy Island, Devon. Her four crew abandoned ship but were subsequently lost attempting to reach Ilfracombe, Devon.
Ocean	United Kingdom	The smack was wrecked near Cardigan.
Schoolgirl	United Kingdom	Great Storm of October 1895: The sail fishing smack foundered off the Crusader Bank. One of her boats washed ashore at St. Ann's. Lost with two hands.

=== 4 October ===
List of shipwrecks: 4 October 1895
Ship	State	Description
Lyric	United States	The steamer was towed under and sunk while providing provisions to J. V. Moran (United States), probably in the harbor of Duluth, Minnesota.
Zoe	United Kingdom	The brigantine struck the Mixon Shoal, in the Bristol Channel and foundered with the loss of all hands. She was on a voyage from Liverpool, Lancashire to Swansea, Glamorgan.

=== 5 October ===
List of shipwrecks: 5 October 1895
Ship	State	Description
Garfield	United Kingdom	The full-rigged ship caught fire in the Pacific Ocean and was abandoned. She was on a voyage from Liverpool, Lancashire to Valparaíso, Chile. The wreck was subsequently towed in to Coquimbo Chile.

=== 6 October ===
List of shipwrecks: 6 October 1895
Ship	State	Description
Reindeer	United States	Reindeer The wooden schooner went aground on the shore of Lake Huron near Rogers City, Michigan, and eventually broke up. Her wreck lies in 16 feet (4.9 m) of water at 45.410333°N 83.766433°W.

=== 7 October ===
List of shipwrecks: 7 October 1895
Ship	State	Description
Africa	Canada	The steam barge sank in 275 feet (84 m) of water in Lake Huron near the Bruce Peninsula. Lost with all hands. The wreck was located in June 2023.
Gen'l H. F. Devol	United States	The laid up steamer was destroyed by fire at New Orleans, Louisiana.
May Libbie	United States	The steamer struck a boom just above the Wynona bridge knocking a hole in her hull causing her to fill and sink in six feet (1.8 m) of water. Raised and repaired.
Severn	Canada	The barge broke up off the Bruce Peninsula after being cut loose by Africa (Canada) on Lake Huron.

=== 13 October ===
List of shipwrecks: 13 October 1895
Ship	State	Description
Resolute	United States	The steamer struck a snag and sank at Prophets Island, Louisiana. Later raised.

=== 15 October ===
List of shipwrecks: 15 October 1895
Ship	State	Description
Isle of Wight	United States	The steamer burned to the water's edge at Smithfield, Virginia.
Jennie Louise	United States	The steamer struck a snag and sank between Vermilion Bayou and Morgan City, Louisiana. Later raised.

=== 17 October ===
List of shipwrecks: 17 October 1895
Ship	State	Description
Gladiator	United States	The tug burned to the waterline at dock in Sault Ste. Marie, Michigan and was scuttled to prevent further damage. Raised in May 1896, rebuilt and returned to service.
Harberton	United Kingdom	While en route from her home port of London to Barry in ballast she hit the Kettle's Bottom Reef between Land's End, Cornwall and the Longships. On a rising tide she drifted off and a steam tug towed her into Whitesand Bay.
Otego	United States	The steamer caught fire, burned and sank at the Northwest Fuel Company dock, Green Bay, Wisconsin. Her 2nd Engineer jump overboard and drowned.

=== 18 October ===
List of shipwrecks: 18 October 1895
Ship	State	Description
Ethel	Canada	The schooner was wrecked off the mouth of the Portapique River, Nova Scotia.

=== 19 October ===
List of shipwrecks: 19 October 1895
Ship	State	Description
Ajax	United Kingdom	The ship collided with Diamond (United Kingdom) and sank 15 nautical miles (28 km) off Souter Point, Northumberland with the loss of a crew member. Survivors were rescued by Diamond.
Alvin	United States	The steamer struck a snag and sank in the Lower Grand River, Louisiana. Later raised.

=== 20 October ===
List of shipwrecks: 20 October 1895
Ship	State	Description
John Craig	United States	The steamer struck Ballard's Reef in the Detroit River and sank. Raised and taken to Buffalo, New York.

=== 21 October ===
List of shipwrecks: 21 October 1895
Ship	State	Description
Kate Thomas	United Kingdom	The steamship was wrecked off Point Cires west of Ceuta, while on a voyage from Cardiff to Brindisi with a cargo of coal.

=== 22 October ===
List of shipwrecks: 22 October 1895
Ship	State	Description
City of St. Augustine	United States	The steamer was destroyed by fire 18 miles (29 km) off Hatteras, North Carolina. The crew was rescued by City of Macon (United States).

=== 24 October ===
List of shipwrecks: 24 October 1895
Ship	State	Description
John F. Allen	United States	The steamer struck a snag and sank at Mill Bayou, Mississippi in the Tallahatchie River. Later raised.
Thasos	Germany	The vessel was built in 1878 as Theben for the Kosmos Line and sailed to South America for years. In 1895 the ship was sold to the Levant Line, which operated a scheduled service with the countries around the Black Sea. On her maiden voyage, with a valuable cargo of cane goods, the ship foundered near Terschelling, the Netherlands, due to a navigation error.

=== 31 October ===
List of shipwrecks: 31 October 1895
Ship	State	Description
George E. Brockway	United States	The steamer got a line hung up in her prop and drifted onto Iroquois Island on Lake Superior and was scuttled to prevent further damage.

=== Unknown date ===
List of shipwrecks: Unknown date October 1895
Ship	State	Description
Cato	Norway	The steamer ran aground on Macabou Cae, Martinique in the Caribbean while carrying coal.
Copernicus	United Kingdom	The cargo ship went missing after leaving Punta Arenas, Chile on 16 October.

== November ==
=== 2 November ===
List of shipwrecks: 2 November 1895
Ship	State	Description
Missoula	United States	The steamer broke her outboard shaft to her engine in a gale and heavy seas. She sprung a leak and sank in Lake Superior. Her crew made it to shore in her boats.

=== 3 November ===
List of shipwrecks: 3 November 1895
Ship	State	Description
Joe Peters	United States	The steamer struck an obstruction and sank off Island No. 66 in the Mississippi River.

=== 4 November ===
List of shipwrecks: 4 November 1895
Ship	State	Description
City of McGregor	United States	The laid up steamer sank while waiting to go on a marine railway to re-caulk dried up seam caulking at Eagle Point, Iowa. Raised and repaired.

=== 7 November ===
List of shipwrecks: 7 November 1895
Ship	State	Description
Aunt Mary	United Kingdom	The fishing smack sank at Plymouth, Devon. Her crew were rescued by the fishing smack Ethel (United Kingdom).
Eaglet	United Kingdom	The schooner dragged her anchors at Plymouth and was damaged. She was on a voyage from Teignmouth, Devon to Liverpool, Lancashire. She was towed in to Sutton Pool by the tug Deerhound. (United Kingdom).
Timaru	United Kingdom	The ship collided with a steamship in the River Mersey and was damaged. She was on a voyage from Melbourne, Victoria to Manchester, Lancashire.

=== 8 November ===
List of shipwrecks: 8 November 1895
Ship	State	Description
Dora	United States	The steamer struck a snag and sank in the Black River. Later raised.
Katie	United States	The steamer was sunk in a collision with Newport News (United States) in Hampton Roads near the Bushs Bluff Lightship. Two crew killed.

=== 9 November ===
List of shipwrecks: 9 November 1895
Ship	State	Description
B. S. Rhea	United States	The tow steamer caught fire and was destroyed while in ordinary at Sedamsville, Ohio when fire spread from Sidney Dillon (United States), a total loss.
Puritan	United States	The steamer ran aground on Great Gull Island in dense fog. Refloated on 12 November.
Scotia	United States	The tow steamer caught fire and was destroyed while in ordinary at Sedamsville, Ohio when fire spread from B. S. Rhea (United States), a total loss.
Sidney Dillon	United States	The tow steamer caught fire and was destroyed while in ordinary at Sedamsville, Ohio, a total loss. The fire spread to two other ships.

=== 15 November ===
List of shipwrecks: 15 November 1895
Ship	State	Description
Sunshine	United States	The steamer struck a rock and sank at Cooper's Bar on the Ohio River in three feet (0.91 m) of water. Apparently raised.

=== 16 November ===
List of shipwrecks: 16 November 1895
Ship	State	Description
Gazelle	United States	The steamer was sunk in a collision with Northern King (United States) in the Sault Ste. Marie River in the Neebish Rapids. Raised and taken to dry dock.

=== 19 November ===
List of shipwrecks: 19 November 1895
Ship	State	Description
Harvest Queen	United States	The steamer struck a submerged pile and sank in heavy fog at Nassa's Point in the Columbia River. Raised and taken to Portland, Oregon for repairs.

=== 20 November ===
List of shipwrecks: 20 November 1895
Ship	State	Description
Robert B. Carson	United States	The steamer burned at New Albany, Indiana on the Ohio River, a total loss.

=== 21 November ===
List of shipwrecks: 21 November 1895
Ship	State	Description
Bandorille	United States	The steamer's rudder was disabled crossing the Umpqua River bar and she was washed ashore (43°40′N 124°12′W), a total loss. Her master washed overboard and drowned.
Ethel Cranmer	United States	The steamer burned at dock at Tullytown, Pennsylvania.

=== 22 November ===
List of shipwrecks: 22 November 1895
Ship	State	Description
R. D. M.	United States	The ferry sprang a leak and sank while lying at Perkins Landing in the Arkansas River, a total loss.

=== 25 November ===
List of shipwrecks: 25 November 1895
Ship	State	Description
Jennie Campbell	United States	The steamer struck a snag and sank in the Mississippi River at Newtown Bend, Louisiana, a total loss.
Jim Sheriffs	United States	The steam barge was wrecked in a gale in Lake Michigan on Big Summer Island, declared a total loss. One crewman drowned. Though considered a total loss she was salvaged in May 1896. Rebuilt and returned to service as Jack Dempsey.
Little Sandy	United States	The steamer was sunk in a violent storm just above Carrollton, Kentucky. Raised and repaired.
Mattie C. Bell	United States	The schooner went ashore in a gale in Lake Michigan on Big Summer Island, when her tow ship Jim Sheriffs (United States) was wrecked. Her cargo of coal was removed the next summer.
Michael Groh	United States	The steam barge lost her rudder in a gale on Lake Superior off Grand Island and was driven onto a rock reef at Pictured Rocks. She sank up to her decks and her crew abandoned ship. 140,000 feet of lumber was salvaged shortly after the grounding. She broke up in a storm on 30 November. Her boiler, engine and other machinery were salvaged the next summer.

=== 26 November ===
List of shipwrecks: 26 November 1895
Ship	State	Description
J.M. Allmendinger	United States	The steam barge was stranded/wrecked north of Fox Point, Wisconsin in a snowstorm and gale, a total loss. The crew was rescued by Welcome (United States) and the US Life Saving Service. She broke up in a storm in 1897.

=== 27 November ===
List of shipwrecks: 27 November 1895
Ship	State	Description
No. 269	Imperial Russian Navy	The torpedo boat sank after colliding with the torpedo gunboat Kazarski (Imperial Russian Navy).
Sadie	United States	The tug sank at Covills Folly in the Hudson River when she caught the corner of a dredge, she rolled and filled. Raised and repaired.

=== Unknown date ===
List of shipwrecks: Unknown date in November 1895
Ship	State	Description
Dalegarth, and Astrid	United Kingdom; Norway	The steamships collided in the Scheldt and were damaged.
Eliza	United Kingdom	the barge was wrecked at Dungeness, Kent. Her crew were rescued. She was on a voyage from Shoreham-by-Sea, Sussex to London.
Horace	United Kingdom	The steamship collided with Sigrid (Norway) in the North Sea 70 nautical miles (130 km) off Spurn Head, Yorkshire and was damaged. She was on a voyage from Wyburg, Swededn to Hull, Yorkshire.
Terrier	United Kingdom	The tug was driven ashore at Southend-on-Sea, Essex. She was refloated.
West Stanley	United Kingdom	The steamship was driven ashore at Hittarp, Sweden. She was on a voyage from Hernosand, Sweden to Cardiff, Glamorgan.
Winifred	United States	The 15-gross register ton schooner was wrecked on the coast of Southeast Alaska while sailing toward Cape Fairweather from Lituya Bay. Her captain made it to shore but died in the mountains while trying to hike to Sitka, District of Alaska.

== December ==
=== 1 December ===
List of shipwrecks: 1 December 1895
Ship	State	Description
Advance	United States	The tow steamer grounded on Sand Creek Bar near Ravenswood, West Virginia and sank in the Ohio River with about three feet (0.91 m) of water on her deck. Raised, taken to Pittsburgh and repaired. A barge she was towing sank and was lost.

=== 3 December ===
List of shipwrecks: 3 December 1895
Ship	State	Description
Little Sandy	United States	The steamer struck an obstruction and sank in 12 feet (3.7 m) of water in the Kentucky River 20 miles (32 km) from Carrollton, Kentucky.

=== 4 December ===
List of shipwrecks: 4 December 1895
Ship	State	Description
Hebe	United States	The steam canal boat was sunk in a collision with a barge, one of five under tow by the tugs Rambler and Mischief, (both United States), in the East River. The crew were rescued by Mischief.

=== 7 December ===
List of shipwrecks: 7 December 1895
Ship	State	Description
Pearl B. Campbell	United States	The wrecking tug foundered in a gale and heavy snow in Lake Superior 20 miles (32 km) off Huron Island, lost with all seven hands. Other tugs in the area reported heavy icing of the vessels.

=== 11 December ===
List of shipwrecks: 11 December 1895
Ship	State	Description
Seventy-Six	United States	The 38.11-gross register ton, 60-foot (18 m) schooner departed Woody Island in the Kodiak Archipelago bound for Kayak Island and Prince William Sound on the south-central coast of the District of Alaska on a trading voyage carrying one passenger and a crew of six and disappeared with the loss of all seven men on board, presumably foundering in a gale that struck the Gulf of Alaska soon after her departure. The steamer Dora (United States) later discovered wreckage from Seventy-Six washed ashore near Kodiak.

=== 14 December ===
List of shipwrecks: 14 December 1895
Ship	State	Description
Elwood	United States	The 97.27-gross register ton, 84-foot (25.6 m) schooner was wrecked on a reef off Gardner Point (57°01′N 134°37′W) in Southeast Alaska with the loss of one life. The rest of her crew reached shore and eventually was rescued by the revenue cutter USRC Wolcott ( United States Revenue Cutter Service).

=== 16 December ===
List of shipwrecks: 16 December 1895
Ship	State	Description
Roy	United States	The tow steamer was crushed by ice and sank on Lake Erie near Toledo, Ohio in 24 feet (7.3 m) of water.

=== 21 December ===
List of shipwrecks: 21 December 1895
Ship	State	Description
Condor	Norway	The barque was sunk in a collision off Beachy Head.

=== 24 December ===
List of shipwrecks: 24 December 1895
Ship	State	Description
Civil Service Number Seven	Royal National Lifeboat Institution	The lifeboat capsized with the loss of all 15 crew while going to assistance of the steam barque Palme (Russia), which had wrecked in Dublin Bay, Ireland.
El Mora	United States	The tug caught fire overnight at dock in Jersey City, New Jersey and was scuttled to put out the fire by two other tugs.
Palme	Russia	The steam barque was wrecked in Dublin Bay, Ireland. The steamer Tearaght (United Kingdom) rescued the crew of Palme and her ship's cat on 26 December.
Pilgrim	United Kingdom	The schooner was missing off Land's End, Cornwall.

=== 31 December ===
List of shipwrecks: 31 December 1895
Ship	State	Description
James G. Blaine	United States	The steamer sank over night at Hatfield Landing on the Monongahela River. Raised, repaired, and returned to service.
Puritan	United States	The laid up steamer burned and sank at dock in Manistee, Michigan, a total loss. Possibly raised, or engine and boiler salvaged, in 1898.

=== Unknown date ===
List of shipwrecks: Unknown date December 1895
Ship	State	Description
Falcon	United States	The fishing schooner left Gloucester, Massachusetts on 23 November for the Georges Bank and was never seen again. Most likely lost in a gale on 11/12 December. Lost with all 11 crew.
John W. Bray	United States	The fishing schooner left Gloucester, Massachusetts on 19 November for the Georges Bank and was never seen again. Most likely lost in a gale on 11/12 December. Lost with all 14 crew.

== Unknown date ==
List of shipwrecks: Unknown date 1895
Ship	State	Description
Daisy	United Kingdom	The smack went missing sometime in 1895, lost with all hands.
Granite State	United States	The full-rigged ship struck the Runnel Stone and was beached on the coast of Cornwall, United Kingdom. She broke up on 7 November.
Jacob A. Howland	United States	The 355-ton whaling bark was lost at Strong Island (now Kosrae) in the North Pacific Ocean at (05°15′N 163°00′E).
Lady of the Lake	United States	The retired excursion ship — a paddle steamer — sank in 30 feet (9.1 m) of water off the west shore of Lake Winnipesaukee in New Hampshire, in Glendale Cove between Pig Island and the Glendale shore, sometime in 1895 while under tow to be scuttled.
Noddleburn	United Kingdom	The barque sailed from Newcastle, New South Wales on 25 June 1895 for Tocopilla, Chile, with a cargo of coal. She was never seen again.
Pearl	United Kingdom	The smack was wrecked at Rossall sometime in 1895.
Sea Lion	Canada	The 51-ton sealing schooner was lost with all hands in the North Pacific Ocean.
Sentinel	Canada	Sources disagree on the barquentine's fate. She may have been lost in a storm in August.According to other accounts, her cargo caught fire on 22 September in the Atlantic Ocean at 32°47′N 38°26′W), her crew abandoned ship in her boats on 23 September, by 24 September she had burned to the waterline, and her crew was rescued on 28 September by Kiandra (Germany),
