= SS Victoria (1902) =

Merchant ship

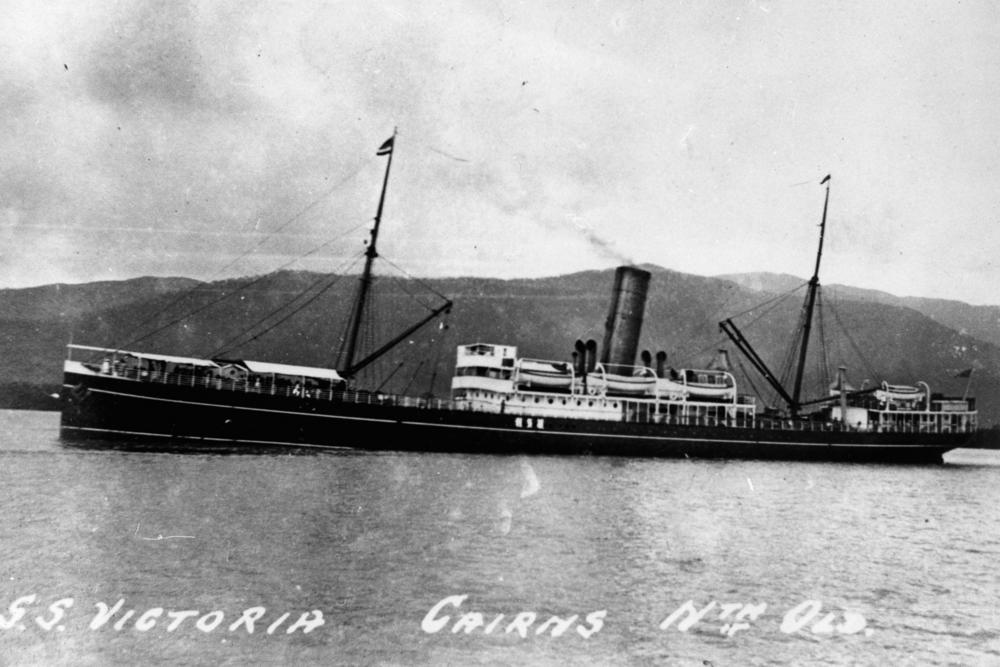

History

United Kingdom
- Name: Victoria
- Owner: Pacific Steam Navigation Company
- Operator: Pacific Steam Navigation Company
- Builder: Fairfield Shipbuilding & Engineering Company, Govan
- Yard number: 420
- Launched: August 2, 1902
- Christened: Victoria
- Home port: Liverpool
- Identification: UK Official Number 115316; Call sign TPQB
- Fate: Scrapped, 1924

General characteristics
- Type: Cargo-Passenger Ship
- Tonnage: 5,967 GRT; 3,742 NRT
- Length: 401 ft 4 in (122.33 m)
- Beam: 52 ft 3 in (15.93 m)
- Depth: 26 ft 2 in (7.98 m)
- Installed power: 550 Nhp
- Propulsion: 2 x Fairfield Shipbuilding & Engineering Company 3-cylinder triple expansion
- Speed: 13.5 knots (15.5 mph; 25.0 km/h)

Victoria was a steam ship built in 1902 by the Fairfield Shipbuilding & Engineering Company of Govan. She was employed by the Pacific Steam Navigation Company on their routes along the West coast of South America, from Valparaíso to Callao.

== Design and construction ==
Victoria was one of the four sister ships (Panama, California and Mexico being the other three) ordered by the Pacific Steam Navigation Company in early 1900s to serve their South American routes. The ship was launched on August 2, 1902, and commissioned later the same year. As built, the ship was 401 feet 4 inches (122.33 m) long (between perpendiculars) and 52 feet 3 inches (15.93 m) abeam, a mean draft of 26 feet 2 inches (7.98 m). Victoria was assessed at 5,967 GRT and 3,742 NRT. The vessel had a steel hull, and two 550 nhp triple-expansion steam engines, with cylinders of 22 1/2-inch (57 cm), 38-inch (97 cm), and 63-inch (160 cm) diameter with a 48-inch (120 cm) stroke, that drove twin screw propellers, and moved the ship at up to 13.5 knots (15.5 mph; 25.0 km/h).

The vessel was designed to carry as many passengers as possible given her size. On her main deck, besides quarters for the crew, there were accommodations for about 120 second-class and over 140 third-class passengers. On her spar-deck there were smoking and dining rooms for 30 second-class and about 70 first-class passengers. Her promenade deck boasted a spacious dining saloon for 130 and rooms for 42 first-class passengers. Overall, the vessel could accommodate 106 first, 104 second and 595 third class passengers.

== Operational history ==
Upon entering the service Victoria was put on England to South America route and departed for her maiden voyage on March 5, 1903 to Valparaíso. Upon arrival at Valparaíso she was immediately put on the Callao route.

On July 23, 1908 Victoria sailed from Coronel at around 11:50 for Penco. At around 12:20 a dense fog set in the Bay of Arauco forcing the ship to reduce her speed. At 12:35 a whistle was heard on the starboard side, prompting the captain to order engines full stop. At 12:42 a steamer appeared in sight crossing from the starboard to port side. The engines were put in full speed astern but about 90 seconds later the ships collided. The ship, Victoria collided with, was 2,213 GRT Chilean steamer Don Matias, on a passage from Tocopilla for Lota with a cargo of copper ore. Don Matias foundered almost immediately after the collision, but her crew was saved in their entirety by Victoria and landed at Coronel.

-- x --

The attached picture originates from the State Library of Queensland and depicts SS Victoria at Cairns, Queensland, Australia. Further, the National Museum of NZ (Te Papa) has a ships postcard which positively identifies the ship as SS Victoria. However, surviving passenger manifests held in Archives NZ indicate disembarkation of passengers at Auckland New Zealand following passage from Sydney, Australia in 1908.

This calls into question the preceding text as it conflicts with the aforementioned surviving passenger manifest. Specifically, the text indicates a collision at sea whereas the passenger manifest shows the ship disembarking passengers in a completely different part of the world.

Although this does not rule out the ship being in both places, it seems highly unlikely. There were a number of ships named Victoria so it's entirely possible that the text and the picture refer to two different ships. Alternatively, perhaps the same ship operated in different portions of the world in different seasons (Summer / Winter). Further scholarly investigation would likely be warranted to clear up the confusion.

TBC
