= SS Mexico =

SS Mexico is the name of several ships.

== List ==
- SS Mexico (sank 1837), a sailing ship, an American barque that wrecked in 1837 at Hempstead Beach, Near Rockaway, Long Island, New York, United States
- SS Mexico, a ship in service in 1849 on the U.S. West Coast
- SS Mexico (1851), a steamship, a U.S. sidewheel steamer built in New York in 1851 as a river steamer, that served in the American Civil War on both sides, as CSS General Bragg for the Confederates, and captured by the Union in 1862, becoming USS General Bragg.
- SS Mexico (wrecked 1886), a sailing ship, a German barque which wrecked off England in 1886.
- SS Mexico (1890), a steamship, a British screw steamer built in Belfast in 1890, that was wrecked in 1895 at Belle Isle, Newfoundland
- SS Mexico (sank 1914), a sailing ship, a Norwegian schooner that wrecked off the Keeragh Islands in County Wexford, Ireland, during 1914
- SS Mexico (1898), a ship of the Ward Line, later becoming Colon and then Yukon, and wrecked in 1946 at Johnstone Bay, Prince William Sound, Alaska, United States.
- SS Mexico (1906), a ship of the Ward Line
- SS Mexico (1933), a ship of the Ward Line
- SS Mexico Victory, the Mexico, a Victory ship built in 1944 by the U.S. for WWII duties

== See also ==
- USS New Mexico
- New Mexico-class battleship
- USS Mexican
- SS Mexique
- Wreck of the Mexico (disambiguation), various shipwrecking incidents involving ships named Mexico

== Notes ==
- "S. S." has been variously used to refer to a sailing ship, a steamship (any kind of steam-power-propelled ship), a screw steamer (a steam-powered ship with screw propellers for propulsion)
