= SS Florida (1889) =

Wooden hulled Great Lakes freighter

Coordinates: 45°17.781′N 83°17.011′W

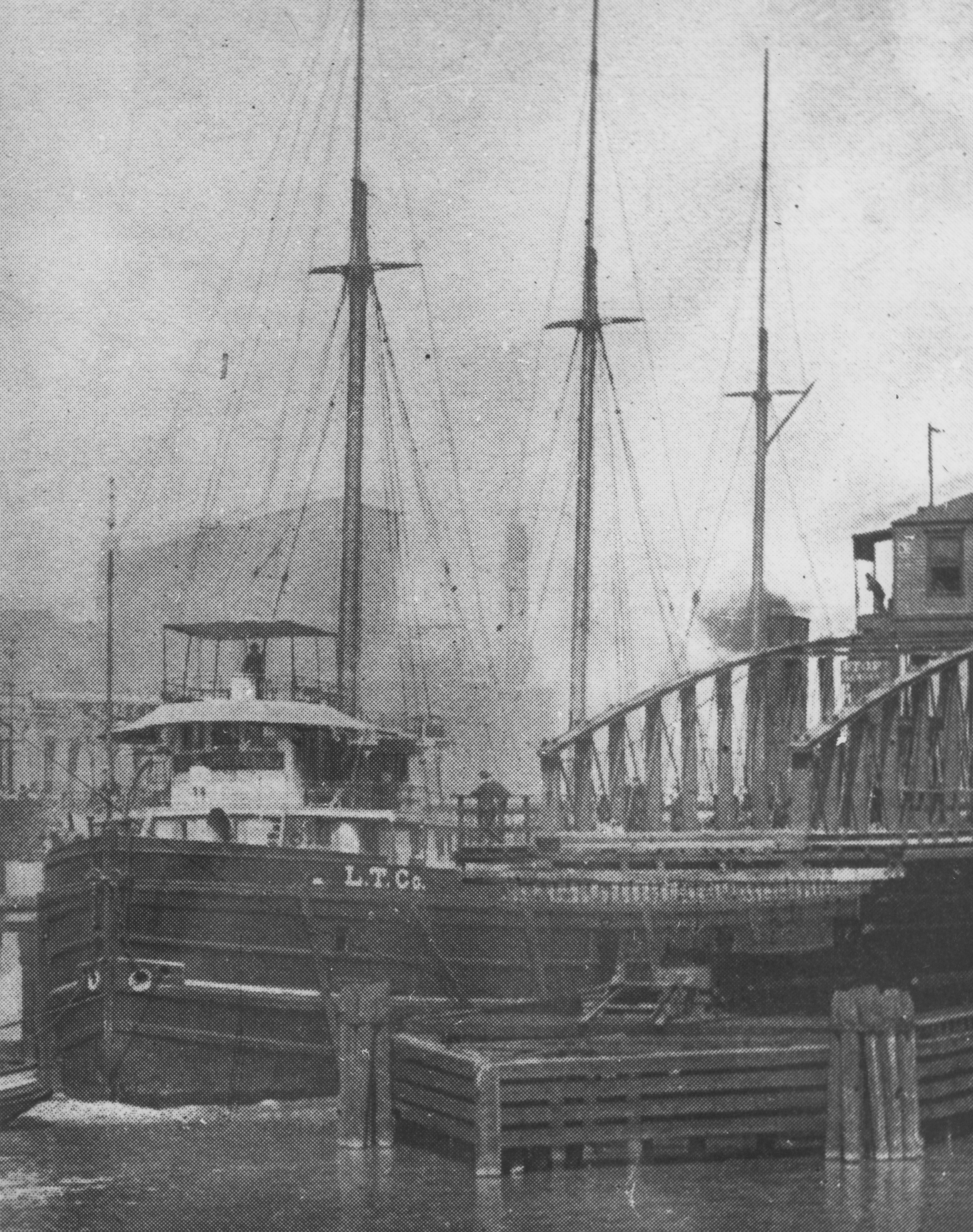
- The Florida c. 1890

History

United States
- Name: Florida
- Owner: Peter P. Miller
- Builder: Robert Mills & Company
- Launched: April 25, 1889
- In service: May 25, 1889
- Out of service: May 21, 1897
- Identification: U.S. Registry #120753
- Fate: Sank in a collision with the George W. Roby

General characteristics
- Tonnage: 2,103 GRT; 1,834 NRT
- Length: 270.3 ft (82.4 m)
- Beam: 40.2 ft (12.3 m)
- Depth: 15.4 ft (4.7 m)
- Installed power: Steam

SS Florida was a wooden-hulled Great Lakes freighter that served on the Great Lakes from her construction in 1889, to her sinking in May 1897 when she collided with the larger wooden hulled freighter George W. Roby. Her wreck was located in July 1994, in 206 feet (63 m) of water almost completely intact, save for her stern.

== History ==
The Florida (Official number 120753) was built in 1889 by Robert Mills & Company in Buffalo, New York for Peter P. Miller of Buffalo, New York. At a length of 270.3 feet (82.4 m) in length, the Florida was one of the largest wooden ships ever built; her beam was 40.2 feet (12.3 m) wide, and her hull was 15.4 feet (4.7 m) deep. She had a gross tonnage of 2103.36 tons, and a net tonnage of 1834.65 tons. She had a cargo capacity of 2400 tons. She was powered by a 650-horsepower triple expansion steam engine that was built by H.G. Trout of Buffalo, New York, and had three cylinders that had a 32 & 52 × 45 inch bore, and a 20-inch stroke.

She was launched on April 25, 1889.

On October 12, 1889, the Florida ran aground at Sault Ste. Marie, Michigan, and was freed by the tugs Mystic and Swain after unloading several hundred tons of coal. In 1890, she was chartered to the Lackawanna Transportation Company, where she would carry cargoes of grain and coal between Buffalo, New York and Chicago, Illinois. In October 1893, the Florida went ashore near Whiting, Indiana and was raised and repaired.

== Final voyage ==
In May 1897, the Florida left Chicago, Illinois, with a cargo of flour, barrels of whiskey, syrup, and various manufactured goods. She then proceeded to sail up Lake Michigan, into the Straits of Mackinac and finally into upper Lake Huron. On May 20, 1897, at around 9:00 a.m., the Florida was rammed by the larger freighter George W. Roby in a dense fog off the coast of Presque Isle, Michigan. All her crew were taken aboard the Roby. During her sinking, escaping air from her hull blew her cabins off. Captain Henry Murphy, her captain said that "the ship collapsed like a jackknife when the stern hit bottom in over 200 feet (61 m) feet of water".

== The wreck ==
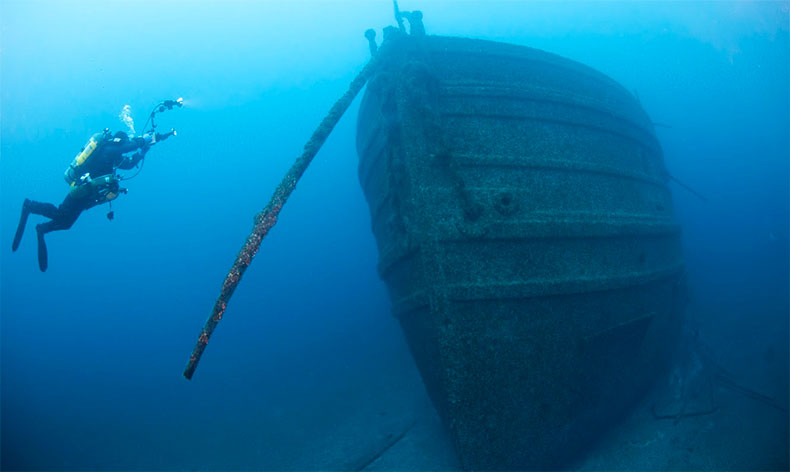
Wreck of the Florida

The remains of the Florida rest in 160 feet (49 m) of water from her deck, and 206 feet (63 m) of water from the lake bottom. Most of her hull is completely intact, except for her stern which collapsed when she hit the bottom. Her broken stern exposes her triple expansion steam engine that still has its intact gauge panel. Although the forward cabins are gone, the boiler cabin remains attached to her hull. Forward of her boiler cabin is a wooden deckhouse, which could be a guest dining room. Her masts lie on her deck. Her cargo is also still in her hold. Her wreck lies close to the early steel freighter Norman.
