= SS Norman =

Shipwreck in Lake Huron, Michigan, United States

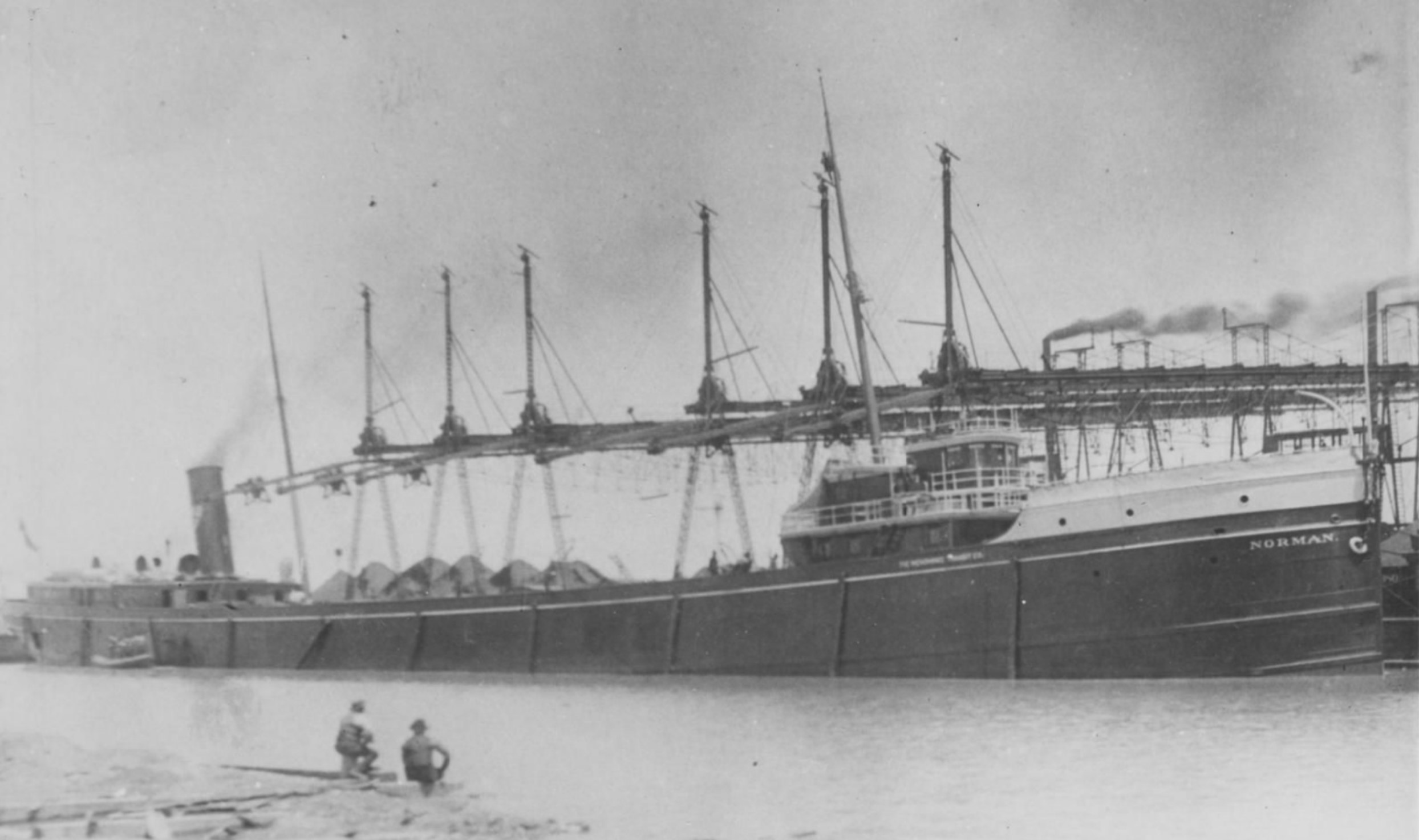
- The Norman prior to her sinking

History

United States
- Name: Norman
- Operator: Menominee Steamship Co.
- Builder: Globe Iron Works Company
- Launched: 30 August 1890
- Completed: 1890
- Fate: Wrecked in Lake Huron May 30, 1895

General characteristics
- Tonnage: 2,304 tons
- Length: 296 ft (90 m)
- Beam: 40 ft (12 m)
- Depth: 21 ft (6.4 m)
- Decks: 2
- Propulsion: Screw
- Notes: Official Number: US130505
- NORMAN (shipwreck)
- U.S. National Register of Historic Places
- Location within Michigan Location within the United States
- Location: Lake Huron, 10.35 miles east-southeast of Presque Isle Museum
- Coordinates: 45°18′42″N 83°16′44″W
- Architectural style: shipwreck site
- NRHP reference No.: 16000819
- Added to NRHP: November 22, 2016

Norman was a bulk freighter; its wreck in Lake Huron (also designated 20UH018) was listed on the National Register of Historic Places in 2016.

== Description ==
The Norman had an overall length of 296.5 feet, a 40.4 foot beam, 21 foot hold depth, and a gross tonnage of 2,304 tons. It had a raised forecastle and pilothouse, an aft cabin that housed the propulsion machinery, and an open deck in between that held eight hatches. The Norman was powered by a triple expansion steam engine built by Globe Iron Works Company that produced 1200 horsepower, along with two 14 foot by 12½ foot Scotch boilers.

== History ==
The Norman was built in 1890 by the Globe Iron Works in Cleveland, Ohio. She was one of the first propeller-driven steel lakers that hauled iron and coal on the Great Lakes. She was built for the Chapin Iron Mining Company, and ran between the company's docks in Escanaba, Michigan and Cleveland, Ohio.

On May 30, 1895, the Norman was loaded with coal and headed to Escanaba. Dense fog reduced visibility, and the Canadian steamer Jack collided with the Norman, with the Jack hitting the Norman amidships and nearly slicing her in two. The Norman quickly sank, taking three crewmen with her. The remainder of the crew were picked up by the Jack and the nearby steam barge Sicken.

Salvage efforts in 1896 failed.

== The wreck ==
The wreck was not located until 1986. She lies in 210 feet (64 m) of water, and much of the below deck area is accessible to divers. It sits angled on the lake bottom with its starboard side pointing up towards the surface. There is large opening from the collision amidships. A davit, capstan, deck cleats, and the two bow anchors are all extant on the bow section. The foremast and mainmast are in place, rising roughly 60 feet. The aft section is separated from the remainder of the ship. The steam engine and the boilers are exposed. The wreck sits near the wreck of the wooden freighter Florida.
