= Caleta Buena =

Town in Chile

Coordinates: 19.881°S 70.131°W

- Town
- Caleta Buena
- Coat of arms

- Country: Chile
- Region: Tarapacá Region
- Province: El Tamarugal
- Established: 1888
- Area code: (+56) 5

Caleta Buena is a Chilean town. The town is currently uninhabited and located in the commune of Huara, Province of Tarapacá, Region of Tarapacá. It is located 30 km south of Pisagua and 31 km north of Iquique. Geographically, Caleta Buena is a small cove.

== History ==
Caleta Buena was founded 15 August 1888 by Santiago Humberstone to board saltpeter from the saltpeter Agua Santa. A commune was created in 1891, with a municipality administering the local affairs between 1894 and 1895, when it was suppressed by a law. In 1929, the town was affected by a voracious fire that started during a cinematographic projection at the local theater. In the 1930s, due to the great depression and the nitrate crisis, the Agua Santa nitrate company sold all its assets to the state of Chile. In 1940, as a result of heavy rain, a flood destroyed much of what remained of the town leaving it abandoned.

During the 2011 Dakar Rally, Caleta Buena was one of the routes in the racing tournament. The town through the A-514 route connects to the cities of Alto Hospicio and Pisagua.
