= SS Chicora =

Passenger-and-freight steamer in service on the Great Lakes

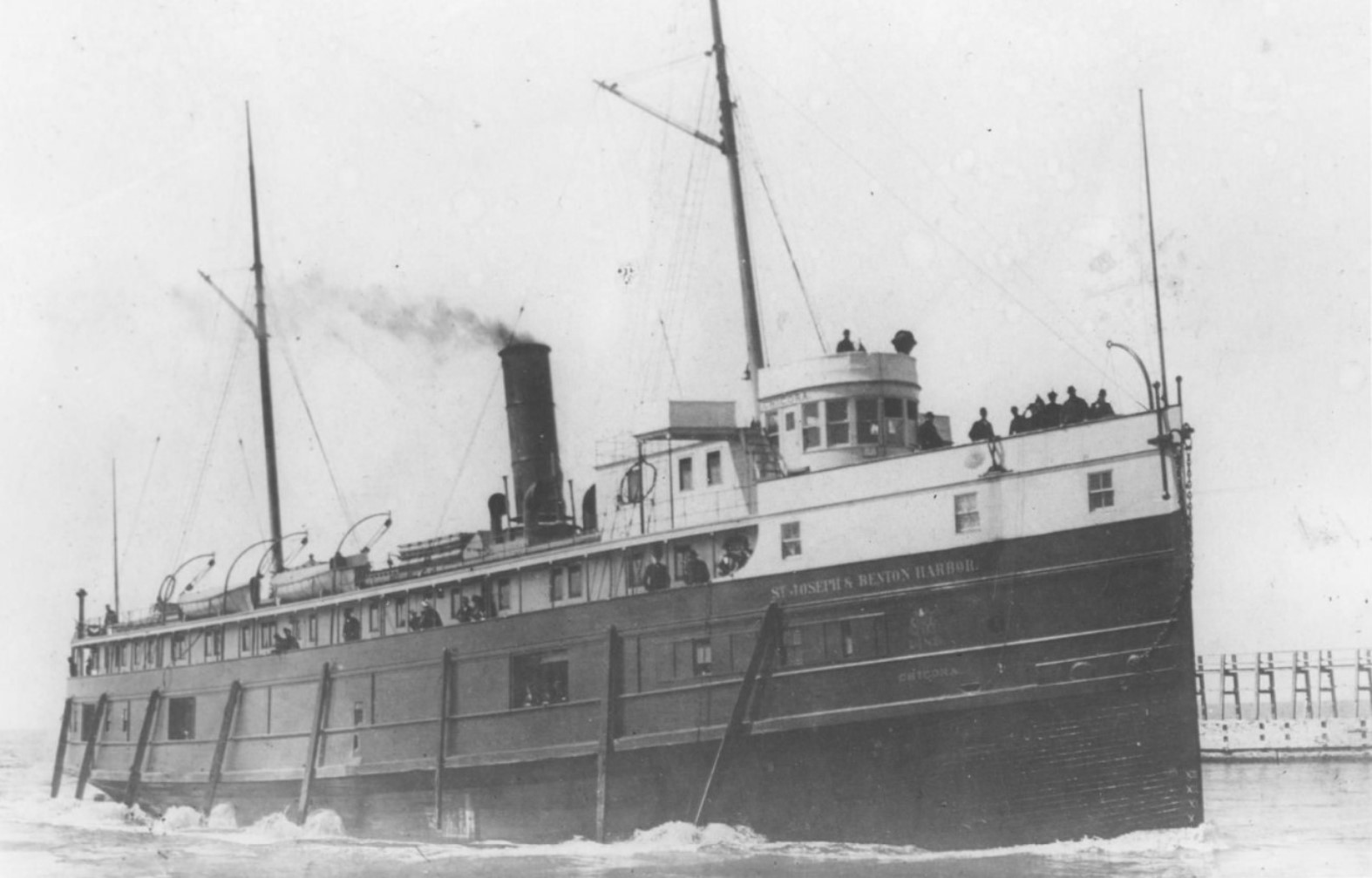
- The Chicora underway

History

United States
- Name: SS Chicora
- Operator: Graham & Morton Transportation Company
- Builder: Detroit Drydock Company
- Launched: 26 June 1892
- Completed: July 1892
- Home port: St. Joseph, Michigan
- Fate: Sunk on Lake Michigan January 1895

General characteristics
- Type: Passenger-cargo
- Tonnage: 1,123 GRT
- Length: 200 ft (61 m); 217 ft (66 m) oa
- Beam: 40 ft 0 in (12.19 m)
- Depth: 15 ft (4.6 m)
- Installed power: 1 × 2500 HP Triple expansion
- Propulsion: Single screw
- Speed: 15.5 kn (18 mph/29 km/h)
- Capacity: 1,200 passengers (summer season)
- Crew: 21
- Notes: 21 crew & 1 passenger lost

SS Chicora was a passenger-and-freight steamer built in 1892 for service on the Great Lakes. Considered to be one of Lake Michigan's finest steamers, she was lost with all hands in January 1895. She is now remembered chiefly for being mentioned by Chicago writer Nelson Algren, in Algren’s prose-poem, Chicago: City on the Make: “Who now knows the sorrowful long-ago name of the proud steamer Chicora, down with all hands in the ice off South Haven?” as well as “Sunk under the ice in the waves off South Haven, sunk with all hands for good and forever, for keeps and a single day.”

== Construction and design ==
Chicora, a wooden-hulled, screw-propelled, passenger-cargo ship, was built in 1892 by the Detroit Drydock Company of Detroit, Michigan, for the Graham & Morton Transportation Company. Designed by Frank Kirby, her cost was $150,000. Chicora was launched from the builder's Orleans Street yard at about 3 pm, 26 June 1892, and completed in July; her yard number was 111.

Chicora was approximately 200 feet (61 m) in length—217 feet (66 m) overall—with a beam of 35 feet (11 m)—40 feet (12 m) over the guards—and moulded depth of 15 feet (4.6 m). She had a tonnage of 1,123 gross tons, or 900 tons burden. Chicora was licensed to carry 1,500 passengers as a summer excursion boat, with passenger accommodations which included 56 staterooms, sleeping quarters for 200, a large smoking room and "spacious" social hall. Her passenger cabins, grand staircase and gangways were all finished in mahogany, and an electric plant provided power for the ship's 250 lights. For freight service in the winter off-season, Chicora was built "especially stout" and had six-inch (15 cm) outer planking and three waterproof compartments.

Chicora was powered by a 2,500 horsepower (1,900 kW), triple-expansion steam engine with cylinders of 20, 33 and 54 inches (51, 84 and 137 cm) and 42 inches (110 cm) stroke, driving a single screw propeller, while steam was provided by two steel forced-draft Scotch boilers with a working pressure of 165 pounds. The ship had a speed of approximately 15.5 knots (17.8 mph; 28.7 km/h)—a fast speed for the time.

When newly built, Chicora was described as a "masterpiece", with "lines ... as symmetrical and beautiful as any yacht". She was considered to be the flagship of the Graham and Morton Line, and one of the finest vessels on Lake Michigan—the "Queen Mary" of the lake.

== Service history ==
Originally built for service between St. Joseph and Chicago, Chicora once made the 65-mile (105 km) run between Benton Harbor and Chicago in 3 hours 40 minutes, at an average speed in excess of 19 miles per hour (31 km/h). In the winter of 1893/94, Chicora was placed on the St. Joseph–Milwaukee route, and again the following winter.

Chicora sank in Lake Michigan on 21 January 1895 off Milwaukee with a cargo of flour. Portions of wreckage of the missing vessel-consisting of the Port side and forward upper bulwarks five feet (1.5 m) wide and 12 feet (3.7 m) long along with the passenger gangway were found a mile on the ice near South Haven, Michigan. Pieces of wreckage are also reported to have been found. In April 1895 it was reported wreckage was coming ashore at New Buffalo, Michigan. On 19 April 1895 a witness claimed to have seen the Chicora stern down and bow up in the lake between South Haven and Saugatuck, Michigan, on 23 January 1895. Two messages that appeared to be from the ship were also found. A bottle containing a note reading "All is lost, could see land if not snowed and blowed. Engine give out, drifting to shore in ice. Captain and clerk are swept off. We have a hard time of it. 10:15 o'clock." was found on April 14. A week later a jar was found in Illinois containing a note reading "Chicora engines broke. Drifted into trough of sea. We have lost all hope. She has gone to pieces. Good bye. McClure, Engineer."
