= Louis V. Place =

American ship

SV Louis V. Place was a 735-ton three-masted schooner build in the George Christenson shipyard in Kennebunkport, Maine and launched August 30, 1890.

During a delivery of coal from Baltimore to New York, the ship ran aground due to extreme icing and rough seas on February 5, 1895 near Fire Island within sight of the Lone Hill Life-Saving Station.

Rescuers from multiple stations struggled to approach the ship while the crew clung to the ships rigging. A breeches buoy was used to try to rescue the men, but they were unable to retrieve the line due to hypothermia. Captain William H. Squires and the cook Charlie Morrison both fell into the freezing water. The following morning the lifesavers return to find only two men alive: sailors Nelson and Stevens. Nelson died shortly afterwards due to his injuries.

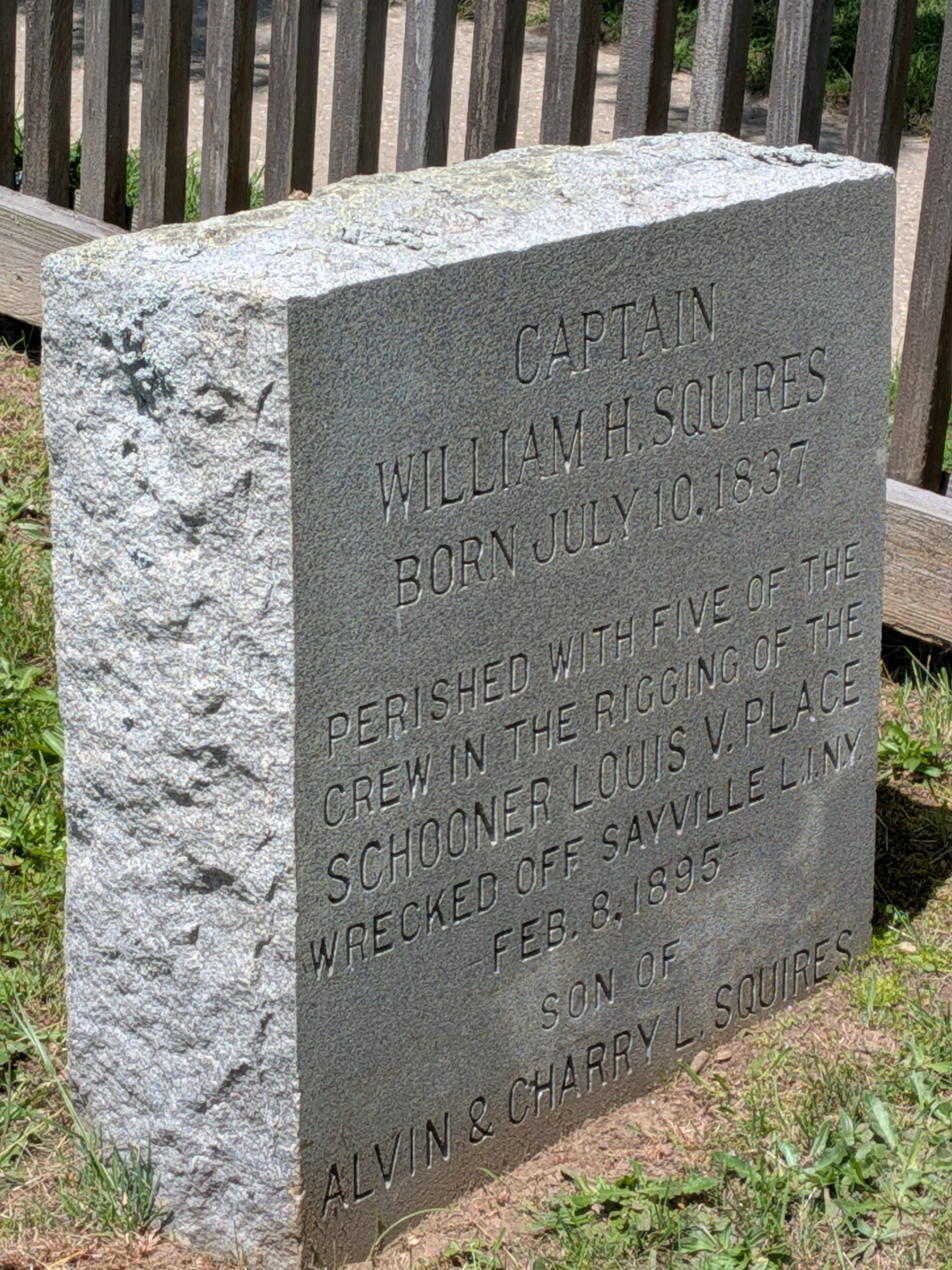
Captain of the schooner Louis V. Place, perished when he fell from the rigging after the ship ran around in icy conditions.

The captain's body washed ashore in Southampton and was later buried in the Southold Old Burying Ground next to his first wife and children.

During the Nor'easter of Feb 6-9, 1895, nearly 30 ships were in distress and in need of aid, but the only loss of life was on the Louis V. Place.
