= List of shipwrecks in January 1837 =

The list of shipwrecks in January 1837 includes ships sunk, foundered, wrecked, grounded, or otherwise lost during January 1837.

== 1 January ==
List of shipwrecks: 1 January 1837
Ship	State	Description
Bonne Nanette	France	The ship was wrecked in the Bay of La Hougue.
Elizabeth	United Kingdom	The ship was driven ashore and wrecked at Gibraltar. She was on a voyage from Tarragona, Spain to Liverpool, Lancashire.
Erie	United States	The ship was driven ashore in the Bay of La Hougue with the loss of all hands. She was later refloated, and arrived at New York on 3 March.
Evelina	France	The ship was wrecked in the Bay of La Hougue.
Monongahela	United States	The ship was driven ashore in the Delaware River. She was on a voyage from Liverpool, Lancashire, United Kingdom to Philadelphia, Pennsylvania. Monongahela subsequently floated off and was blown out to sea.
Reato	Hamburg	The ship was driven ashore near "Highlands". She was on a voyage from Hamburg to Boston.
Soliel	France	The ship was wrecked in the Bay of La Hougue.
Susanne Marie	France	The ship was wrecked in the Bay of La Hougue.
Thames	United Kingdom	The steamship caught fire in the River Thames at Wapping, Middlesex and was scuttled. Her crew survived.
Union	France	The ship was wrecked in the Bay of La Hougue.
Veto	United States	The ship was driven ashore on the coast of New Jersey. She was on a voyage from Hamburg to New York. Veto had been refloated by 11 January and taken in to New York.

== 2 January ==
List of shipwrecks: 2 January 1837
Ship	State	Description
Athol	United Kingdom	The ship was driven ashore at Gibraltar. She was on a voyage from Trieste to Liverpool, Lancashire. Athol was refloated and taken in to Gibraltar for repairs.
Brothers	United Kingdom	The ship was abandoned off Cape St. Vincent, Portugal. Her crew were rescued by Treasurer (United Kingdom). Brothers was on a voyage from London to Newcastle upon Tyne, Northumberland and Constantinople, Ottoman Empire.
Edmond	France	The ship was driven ashore at Gibraltar. She was on a voyage from Marseille, Bouches-du-Rhône to Nantes, Loire-Inférieure.
Havre	France	The ship was driven ashore at Gibraltar. She was on a voyage from Cette, Hérault to Rouen, Seine-Inférieure.
H. M.	United Kingdom	The brig struck the Lemon and Ore Sand and was abandoned by her crew. She was on a voyage from Riga, Russia to London.
HMS Jaseur	Royal Navy	The Cruizer-class brig-sloop was driven ashore at Málaga, Spain.
Laurel	United Kingdom	The ship was driven ashore near Warnemünde, Rostock. Her crew were rescued. She was on a voyage from Riga, Russia to Belfast, County Antrim.
Mexico	United Kingdom	Unable to find a harbor pilot upon reaching Long Island, New York, the ship was ultimately torn asunder by a icy storm and 115 passengers, mostly poor migrants, froze to death on the deck.
HMS Orestes	Royal Navy	The Orestes-class ship-sloop was driven ashore at Málaga.
Paul	France	The ship was driven ashore at Gibraltar. She was on a voyage from Hyères, Var to "Saint-Prieaux".
Sarah	United Kingdom	The ship was wrecked at West Quoddy Head, Maine, United States. She was on a voyage from Saint Kitts to Saint John, New Brunswick, British North America.
Three Sisters	United Kingdom	The ship was driven ashore at Gibraltar. She was on a voyage from Alexandria, Egypt to Hull, Yorkshire. Three Sisters was later refloated, repaired and resumed her voyage.

== 3 January ==
List of shipwrecks: 3 January 1837
Ship	State	Description
Hazard	United Kingdom	The ship was abandoned in the Atlantic Ocean. Her crew were rescued by Anne (United Kingdom).
Jamsegie Jegiebay	India	The ship was wrecked at Quilon.

== 4 January ==
List of shipwrecks: 4 January 1837
Ship	State	Description
Adolphe	France	The ship struck the pier and sank at Dover, Kent, United Kingdom. She was on a voyage from Calais to Dover.
Cornwallis	(United Kingdom of Great Britain and Ireland) New South Wales	The whaler, a brig, was wrecked on Bougainville Island. All on board survived.
Evenwood	United Kingdom	The ship was driven ashore at Stockton-on-Tees, County Durham. She was refloated on 5 January and taken in to Stockton-on-Tees.
St. Vincent	France	The ship was wrecked at Port-au-Prince, Haiti. She was on a voyage from Cuba to Bordeaux, Gironde.
Taramac	United States	The ship was driven ashore and wrecked on Fire Island, New York. All on board survived. She was on a voyage from Liverpool, Lancashire, United Kingdom to New York City.

== 5 January ==
List of shipwrecks: 5 January 1837
Ship	State	Description
Ivanhoe	United States	The ship foundered in a squall off Madeira.
Maria	United Kingdom	The brig was driven ashore and wrecked on Scatarie Island, Nova Scotia, British North America. Her crew were rescued. She was on a voyage from Sydney, Nova Scotia to St. John's, Newfoundland, British North America.
Mexico	United States	The barque was driven ashore and wrecked at Hempstead, New York with the loss of 112 of the 120 people on board. Five of her twelve crew and three of her 108 passengers were rescued. She was on a voyage from Liverpool, Lancashire, United Kingdom to New York City.
Twig	(United Kingdom of Great Britain and Ireland) Jersey	The ship struck the Long Sand, in the North Sea off the coast of Essex and sank. Her crew were rescued. She was on a voyage from South Shields, County Durham to Jersey.
Vesta	United Kingdom	The ship was driven ashore and damaged at Redcar, North Riding of Yorkshire. She was on a voyage from Norwich, Norfolk to Stockton-on-Tees, County Durham. Vesta was later refloated and taken in to the River Tees.

== 6 January ==
List of shipwrecks: 6 January 1837
Ship	State	Description
Amicus	United Kingdom	The ship was in collision with Ida (United Kingdom) and sank in the North Sea off the Yorkshire coast. Her crew were rescued by Ida. Amicus was on a voyage from London to Blyth, Northumberland
Courrier du Banc de Dieppe	France	The brig foundered off the Galloper Sand, in the North Sea with the loss of two of her nine crew. She was on a voyage from Dieppe, Seine-Inférieure to Marseille, Bouches-du-Rhône.
Fortuna	Hamburg	The ship was driven ashore and wrecked on Scharhörn. She was on a voyage from Livorno, Grand Duchy of Tuscany to Hamburg.
Nicholas	Russia	The ship was wrecked at Odesa.
Sarah	United Kingdom	The ship was driven ashore and wrecked at Bideford, Devon. Her crew were rescued. She was on a voyage from Newfoundland, British North America to Bristol, Gloucestershire.

== 7 January ==
List of shipwrecks: 7 January 1837
Ship	State	Description
Dantsic	United Kingdom	The ship ran aground on the Kentish Knock. She was refloated the next day and taken into Sheerness, Kent.
Edwin	United States	The ship was sunk by ice at New York.
Eliza	United Kingdom	The ship was in collision with a brig and was beached at Filey, Yorkshire. She was on a voyage from Newcastle upon Tyne, Northumberland to Wisbech, Cambridgeshire.
Elvira	United States	The brig struck the wreck of Merrymack (flag unknown) and was beached at "Point Redras", Argentina. She was on a voyage from Philadelphia, Pennsylvania to Buenos Aires, Argentina. Elvira was refloated on 16 January and taken into Buenos Aires.
John	United Kingdom	The ship was wrecked near Formby, Lancashire. She was on a voyage from Drogheda, County Louth to Runcorn, Cheshire.
Mary Ann	United Kingdom	The ship was driven ashore at Harwich, Essex.
Orozimbo	United States	The ship was driven ashore near Baltimore, Maryland. She was on a voyage from Liverpool, Lancashire to Baltimore. Orozimbo was refloated on 11 January and taken into Baltimore in a severely damaged condition.
Ranger	United Kingdom	The ship was abandoned in the North Sea off Spurn Point, Yorkshire. Her crew survived.

== 9 January ==
List of shipwrecks: 9 January 1837
Ship	State	Description
Addison	United Kingdom	The ship was wrecked at Hartlepool, County Durham.
Blakestone	United Kingdom	The ship ran aground on the Cross Sand, in the North Sea owing to the lightship being off station as she had been damaged in a collision and had put into Great Yarmouth, Norfolk for repairs.
Hotspur	United Kingdom	The ship ran aground at Cobh, County Cork. She was on a voyage from Cobh to Liverpool, Lancashire.
Jean	United Kingdom	The sloop was driven ashore and wrecked near Fife Ness. Her three crew were rescued. She was on a voyage from the River Eden to Glasgow, Renfrewshire.
William and Mary	United Kingdom	The ship was driven ashore and wrecked 18 nautical miles (33 km) east of Cape Chapeau Rouge, Newfoundland. Her crew were rescued. She was on a voyage from Barbados to St. John's, Newfoundland.

== 10 January ==
List of shipwrecks: 10 January 1837
Ship	State	Description
Caroline	United Kingdom	The ship ran aground on the Herd Sand, in the North Sea off the coast of County Durham. She was on a voyage from London to Grangemouth, Stirlingshire.
Jean and Peggy	United Kingdom	The smack was driven ashore and wrecked near Ardrossan, Ayrshire with the loss of all three people on board.
Liberty	United Kingdom	The sloop collided with Mary (United Kingdom) in the Humber and sank. Her crew were rescued by Mary. Liberty was on a voyage from Wisbech, Cambridgeshire to Goole, Yorkshire.
Saturnus	Sweden	The ship was abandoned in the Dogger Bank. She was on a voyage from Kristianstad to Newcastle upon Tyne, Northumberland, United Kingdom.
Three Brothers	United Kingdom	The ship was abandoned in the North Sea off HuntcliffPort, Yorkshire. She was on a voyage from Hartlepool, County Durham to Whitby, Yorkshire.

== 11 January ==
List of shipwrecks: 11 January 1837
Ship	State	Description
Frederick William III	Hamburg	The ship foundered in the North Sea off Norden, Kingdom of Hanover. She was on a voyage from Hamburg to New York, United States.
Oliver	United States	The ship capsized in the North Sea off Norden. She was on a voyage from Hamburg to New York.
Phœnix	United Kingdom	The ship ran aground and sank on the Haisborough Sands, in the North Sea off the coast of Norfolk. She was on a voyage from Pictou, Nova Scotia, British North America to Hull, Yorkshire. Phœnix was later refloated and anchored off Winterton-on-Sea, Norfolk.

== 12 January ==
List of shipwrecks: 12 January 1837
Ship	State	Description
Elizabeth	United Kingdom	The ship was wrecked in Belcarry Bay with the loss of her captain. She was on a voyage from the Isle of Man to Maryport, Cumberland.
Industry	(United Kingdom of Great Britain and Ireland) New South Wales	The schooner was driven ashore near "Warthor" and was plundered by the local inhabitants.
Innes	United Kingdom	The brig ran aground on a reef off Auchingills, Caithness. She floated off and consequently sank. Her crew survived. She was on a voyage from Leith, Lothian to Odesa.

== 13 January ==
List of shipwrecks: 13 January 1837
Ship	State	Description
Agenoria	United States	The ship was wrecked in the Cayman Islands. Her crew were rescued. She was on a voyage from Jamaica to Norfolk, Virginia.
Ann and Mary	United Kingdom	The ship was driven ashore on Lindisfarne, Northumberland. Her crew were rescued. She was on a voyage from Dysart, Fife to Newcastle upon Tyne, Northumberland.
Blessing	United Kingdom	The schooner sprang a leak and foundered in the Bristol Channel. Her crew survived. She was on a voyage from Salcombe, Devon to Bristol, Gloucestershire.
Eagle	United Kingdom	The schooner was abandoned in the North Sea off Berwick upon Tweed, Northumberland. She subsequently came ashore at Goswick, Northumberland and was damaged. Eagle was on a voyage from Stockton on Tees, County Durham to Dundee, Forfarshire. She was refloated on 23 January and taken into Berwick upon Tweed.
Grahams	United Kingdom	The sloop foundered off the mouth of the River Tay with the loss of all hands.
Lark	United Kingdom	The sloop was driven ashore and severely damaged near Cleethorpes, Lincolnshire.
Three Brothers or Two Brothers	United Kingdom	The sloop capsized in the North Sea off Saltfleet, Lincolnshire with the loss of all hands. She was on a voyage from Goole, Yorkshire to Wisbech, Cambridgeshire.

== 14 January ==
List of shipwrecks: 14 January 1837
Ship	State	Description
Cornubia	United Kingdom	The schooner was driven ashore and wrecked near Dieppe, Seine-Inférieure, France. Her crew were rescued. She was on a voyage from Cardiff, Glamorgan to London.
Montrose	United Kingdom	The ship was driven ashore 2 leagues (6 nautical miles (11 km)) east of Calais, France. She was on a voyage from Newcastle upon Tyne, Northumberland to Bordeaux, Gironde, France and Mauritius. Montrose was refloated on 21 January and taken in to Calais for repairs.
Newcastle	United Kingdom	The ship foundered off Grimsby, Lincolnshire. She was on a voyage from London to Grangemouth, Stirlingshire.
Olinda	Brazil	The ship was driven ashore and wrecked on the north west point of Faial Island, Azores. Her crew were rescued. She was on a voyage from Havana, Cuba to Marseille, Bouches-du-Rhône, France.
Prince Eugene	United Kingdom	The ship was driven ashore at Rock Ferry, Cheshire. She was on a voyage from Gallipoli, Ottoman Empire to Liverpool, Lancashire. Prince Eugene was refloated on 21 January and taken in to Liverpool.
Renown	United Kingdom	The ship caught fire, exploded and sank in the Atlantic Ocean with the loss of eleven of her crew. Survivors were rescued by St. George (United Kingdom) She was on a voyage from Liverpool to Africa.
Reuben	United Kingdom	The ship was driven ashore at Brancaster, Norfolk. She was on a voyage from London to Spalding, Lincolnshire.
Success	United Kingdom	The ship was abandoned in the North Sea off Saltfleet, Lincolnshire. She was on a voyage from King's Lynn, Norfolk to Hull, Yorkshire.
Three Brothers	United Kingdom	The ship was foundered in the North Sea with the loss of all hands. She was on a voyage from Goole, Yorkshire to Boston, Lincolnshire.

== 15 January ==
List of shipwrecks: 15 January 1837
Ship	State	Description
Isabella	United Kingdom	The ship was holed by her anchor and sank at Middlesbrough, Yorkshire.
Meta	United Kingdom	The brig was wrecked on the Cross Sand, in the North Sea. Her crew survived. She was on a voyage from Odesa to Newcastle upon Tyne, Northumberland.
Reform	United Kingdom	The ship was driven ashore near Darßer Ort, Prussia with the loss of all but two of her crew. She was on a voyage from Swinemünde, Prussia to London.

== 16 January ==
List of shipwrecks: 16 January 1837
Ship	State	Description
Hero	United Kingdom	The ship was driven ashore at Nagara Point, in the Dardanelles. She had been refloated by 1 February.
Jessie	United Kingdom	The schooner was driven ashore at Saltfleet, Lincolnshire.
Mitre	United Kingdom	The ship was wrecked on the Cross Sand, in the North Sea. Her crew survived.
Young	United Kingdom	The ship was driven ashore near Saltfleet.

== 18 January ==
List of shipwrecks: 18 January 1837
Ship	State	Description
George	United Kingdom	The Yorkshire Billyboy collided with Belfast (United Kingdom) and sank.

== 20 January ==
List of shipwrecks: 20 January 1837
Ship	State	Description
Amanda	United Kingdom	The ship was driven ashore near Copenhagen, Denmark. She was on a voyage from Swinemünde, Prussia to Hull, Yorkshire. She had been refloated by 28 January and taken into Copenhagen.
Collon	United Kingdom	The ship struck the pier, capsized and was wrecked at Kingstown, County Dublin. She was on a voyage from Troon, Ayrshire to Kingstown.
H and M	United Kingdom	The brig was driven ashore crewless on Terschelling, Friesland, Netherlands.
Phœnix	France	The ship was driven ashore near Calais. She was on a voyage from Bordeaux, Gironde to Dunkirk, Nord.

== 21 January ==
List of shipwrecks: 21 January 1837
Ship	State	Description
Maria Louisa	France	The ship was wrecked at San Javier, Spain with the loss of a crew member. She was on a voyage from Marseille, Bouches-du-Rhône to Algiers, Algeria.

== 22 January ==
List of shipwrecks: 22 January 1837
Ship	State	Description
Sultana	United Kingdom	The ship was driven ashore and wrecked at Wexford. Her crew were rescued. She was on a voyage from Liverpool, Lancashire to New York, United States.

== 23 January ==
List of shipwrecks: 23 January 1837
Ship	State	Description
Emily	United Kingdom	The ship was wrecked at Tristan d'Acunha.
Joseph and Ann	United Kingdom	The ship was driven ashore at Bridlington, Yorkshire. Her crew were rescued. She was on a voyage from Boston, Lincolnshire to Grangemouth, Stirlingshire.
Marie	United Kingdom	The ship was wrecked on the Haaks Bank, in the North Sea. She was on a voyage from Cardiff, Glamorgan to Bremen.
Nelson	United Kingdom	The ship was driven ashore at Bridlington. Her crew were rescued.

== 24 January ==
List of shipwrecks: 24 January 1837
Ship	State	Description
Emprehendedoa	Portugal	The ship was driven ashore and wrecked at Figueira da Foz. She was on a voyage from Araujo to Figueira da Foz.

== 25 January ==
List of shipwrecks: 25 January 1837
Ship	State	Description
Jeronia	United Kingdom	The ship ran aground on the Atherfield Ledge, Isle of Wight. She was on a voyage from Torquay, Devon to London. Jeronia was refloated and taken into Portsmouth, Hampshire.
Scott	United Kingdom	The ship was driven ashore on Crawleys Island. She was on a voyage from Jamaica to Halifax, Nova Scotia, British North America.

== 26 January ==
List of shipwrecks: 26 January 1837
Ship	State	Description
Amity	United Kingdom	The ship ran aground and was damaged at Port Louis, Mauritius. She was on a voyage from London to Port Louis. Amity was later refloated with assistance from HMS Pelican (Royal Navy).
Margaret	United Kingdom	The ship was driven ashore and damaged at Souter Point, County Durham. She was later refloated.
Thomas	United Kingdom	The brig was driven ashore at Harwich, Essex and was abandoned by her crew.

== 27 January ==
List of shipwrecks: 27 January 1837
Ship	State	Description
Barbara	United Kingdom	The ship was lost off Helsingør, Denmark with the loss of all hands.
Corie	United Kingdom	The ship was lost off Helsingør with the loss of all hands.
Euphemia	United Kingdom	The ship struck the Long Ledge. She put in to Topsham, Devon where she sank.
Mars	United Kingdom	The ship was wrecked on the Gunfleet Sand, in the North Sea off the coast of Essex with the loss of a crew member. Survivors were rescued by a fishing smack. She was on a voyage from Newcastle upon Tyne, Northumberland to London.
Royal Adelaide	United Kingdom	The ship was wrecked east of Dungeness, Kent. Her crew were rescued. She was on a voyage from Seaham, County Durham to Portsmouth, Hampshire.

== 28 January ==
List of shipwrecks: 28 January 1837
Ship	State	Description
Eliza and Isabella	United Kingdom	The ship was run down and sunk in the North Sea off Scarborough, Yorkshire by Samuel and Sarah (United Kingdom). Her crew were rescued.
Jane	United Kingdom	The ship was run down and sunk off The Lizard, Cornwall. Her crew were rescued. She was on a voyage from Cardiff, Glamorgan to London.
St. Neil	United Kingdom	The ship was driven ashore in the River Tay. She was on a voyage from London to Dundee, Forfarshire.
St. Thomas	United Kingdom	The ship was driven ashore and wrecked at South Shields, County Durham. She was on a voyage from Harlingen, Friesland, Netherlands to South Shields.

== 29 January ==
List of shipwrecks: 29 January 1837
Ship	State	Description
Cotton	United Kingdom	The ketch capsized and was wrecked at Kingstown, County Dublin with the loss of three of her crew. She was on a voyage from Troon, Ayrshire to Dublin.
Euphemia	United Kingdom	The ship sank at Topsham, Devon.
Mary and Helen	United Kingdom	The ship ran aground at "Kneedshaven". She was on a voyage from Kiel, Duchy of Schleswig to Glasgow, Renfrewshire.
Oporto	United Kingdom	The ship ran aground at Teignmouth, Devon. She was on a voyage from Newcastle upon Tyne, Northumberland to Teignmouth.

== 30 January ==
List of shipwrecks: 30 January 1837
Ship	State	Description
Marina	United Kingdom	The ship was holed by an anchor and consequently beached at Poole, Dorset. She was on a voyage from Sunderland, County Durham to Poole.
Scott	United Kingdom	The ship was driven ashore at "Cherbourg", Nova Scotia. She was on a voyage from Jamaica to "Cherbourg".
Troubadour	United States	The brig was lost at the Río Grande. Her crew were rescued.

== 31 January ==
List of shipwrecks: 31 January 1837
Ship	State	Description
Dispatch	United Kingdom	The ship was driven ashore on the Spanish Battery Rocks, County Durham. She was on a voyage from London to North Shields, County Durham. Dispatch was later refloated and taken into North Shields.

== Unknown date ==
List of shipwrecks: Unknown date in January 1837
Ship	State	Description
Amphion	Sweden	The ship was wrecked on Læsø, Denmark. She was on a voyage from "Wyburg" to Gloucester, United Kingdom.
Ann	United Kingdom	The ship was driven ashore whilst on a voyage from Hull, Yorkshire to Hamburg. She was refloated and taken in to Glückstadt, Duchy of Holstein, where she arrived on 2 February.
Ant	United Kingdom	The ship ran aground on the Beever Rocks. She was on a voyage from Limerick to London. Ant was later refloated and taken in to Limerick.
Argaste	Belgium	The ship was driven ashore at "Dromnes". She was on a voyage from Riga, Russia to Bruges.
Bertha Penning	United Kingdom	The ship caught fire and sank near Delfzijl, Groningen, Netherlands. She was on a voyage from Emden, Kingdom of Hanover to London.
Caspian	United Kingdom	The ship was driven ashore at Wainfleet, Lincolnshire. She was on a voyage from London to Newcastle upon Tyne, Northumberland.
Chilkat	Russian Empire	The Russian-American Company schooner was lost along with her entire crew of 15 off Cape Edgecumbe (56°59′N 135°42′W) in southeastern Russian America.
Dover	United Kingdom	The ship was abandoned in the Atlantic Ocean. Her crew were rescued by Spy (United States).
Duncan	United Kingdom	The ship was abandoned in the Atlantic Ocean with the loss of three of her eighteen crew. Survivors were rescued by Niagara (United States). Duncan was on a voyage from Quebec City, Lower Canada, British North America to Dublin.
Fame	United Kingdom	The ship was driven ashore on the Dutch coast. She was on a voyage from London to Harlingen, Friesland, Netherlands. Fame was refloated on 8 January and taken into the Nieuw Diep.
Frances and Harriet	United Kingdom	The ship was wrecked near Rostock. She was on a voyage from Riga, Russia to London.
Frederick Wilhelmina	Flag unknown	The ship was driven ashore and severely damaged at Hull. She was refloated on 22 January and taken into Hull.
Fortuna	Bremen	The ship was driven ashore whilst on a voyage from Bremen to London. She was refloated and put into Hooksiel, Grand Duchy of Oldenburg.
Gregson	United Kingdom	The ship was destroyed by fire off the coast of India. All on board were rescued. She was on a voyage from Calcutta, India to London.
Heinrich	Hamburg	The ship was driven ashore on the coast of Jeverland, Grand Duchy of Oldenburg. She was on a voyage from the Jahde to London. Heinrich was later refloated.
Henrietta	United Kingdom	The ship caught fire and sank in the North Sea. Her crew were rescued. She was on a voyage from London to a Baltic port.
Hoffnung	Prussia	The ship was foundered on or before 5 January. Her crew were rescued by Arthur (United Kingdom). Hoffnung was on a voyage from Liverpool, Lancashire, United Kingdom to Memel.
Hoop	Netherlands	The ship was lost off Ameland, Friesland on or before 15 January. She was on a voyage from Konigsburg, Prussia to Amsterdam, North Holland.
Imperial	United Kingdom	The ship was wrecked on Bornholm, Denmark. She was on a voyage from Danzig to London.
James Hodder	United Kingdom	The ship was wrecked near Ballyteague, County Wexford before 8 January. She was on a voyage from Campeche, Mexico to Liverpool, Lancashire.
Jean	United Kingdom	The ship was wrecked on the Northern Triangles before 22 January. She was on a voyage from British Honduras to Mobile, Alabama, United States.
Joseph Weller	(United Kingdom of Great Britain and Ireland) New South Wales	The schooner was wrecked on Nobbys Island, near Newcastle.
Leda	United Kingdom	The ship was driven ashore at Kingsdown, Kent. She was on a voyage from Londonderry to London. Leda was later refloated and put into Ramsgate, Kent, where she arrived on 6 January.
Licque	France	The ship was wrecked off Crete. Her crew were rescued.
Maria	Kingdom of Hanover	The ship was driven ashore at Theddlethorpe, Lincolnshire, United Kingdom. She was refloated on 6 January.
Milo	United Kingdom	The ship foundered in the Atlantic Ocean. Her crew were rescued. She was on a voyage from Liverpool to Savannah, Georgia, United States.
Nelson	Kingdom of the Two Sicilies	The brig was wrecked near "Delgastuni", Greece with the loss of three of her crew. More than 300 people were rescued.
Noble	United States	The barque was driven ashore at Cobh, County Cork, United Kingdom. She was on a voyage from Glasgow, Renfrewshire, United Kingdom to New York. Noble was later refloated and taken in to Cobh for repairs.
Phœnix	France	The barque was wrecked in the Nicobar Islands. Her crew survived.
Prinzessin Louisa	Rostock	The ship was wrecked near Rostock. She was on a voyage from Rostock to Copenhagen, Denmark.
Puella	United Kingdom	The ship was driven ashore and wrecked 3 nautical miles (5.6 km) south of Holyhead, Anglesey. Her crew were rescued. She was on a voyage from Dublin to Liverpool.
Queen of the Isles	United Kingdom	The ship was lost about 4 nautical miles (7.4 km) from Cádiz, Spain. Her crew were rescued. She was on a voyage from London to Livorno, Grand Duchy of Tuscany.
Ramona	United Kingdom	The ship was driven ashore and severely damaged at Lowestoft, Suffolk. She was refloated on 22 January.
Skinner	United Kingdom	The ship foundered in the Red Sea.
Sovereign	United Kingdom	The ship ran aground on the Owers Sandbank, in the English Channel. She was on a voyage from Gibraltar to Portsmouth, Hampshire. Sovereign was refloated on 9 January and taken into Portsmouth.
Smyrna	Greece	The steamship was beached at "Guitari Missi".
Spring	United Kingdom	The ship was driven ashore on Terschelling, Friesland, Netherlands.
St Antonia de Padora	Kingdom of Sardinia	The ship was struck by lightning and foundered off Cape Passero, Sicily before 2o January. She was on a voyage from Genoa to Messina, Sicily.
Tiber	United States	The ship capsized in the North Sea. She was on a voyage from Bremen to New York.
Trafalgar	United Kingdom	The ship was driven ashore at Strangford, County Down. She was refloated on 8 January.
Triumph	United Kingdom	The ship was abandoned at sea.
Trois Frères	France	The ship was wrecked in the Raz de Sein.
Two Friends	United Kingdom	The ship was driven ashore and damaged at St. Ives, Cornwall. She was refloated on 5 January.
Veld	Hamburg	The ship was driven ashore on the coast of New Jersey, United States. She was refloated on 10 January and taken in to New York.
Viewly Hill	United Kingdom	The sloop was lost off Winterton-on-Sea, Norfolk on or after 7 January. She was on a voyage from Ipswich, Suffolk to Goole, Yorkshire.
Welcome	United Kingdom	The ship was driven ashore at Yulen Head, County Donegal. She was on a voyage from Liverpool to Ballyshannon, County Donegal. Welcome was refloated on 6 January and taken in to Killybegs.
Whig	United States	The ship departed from Marseille for Mobile, Alabama in late January. No further trace, presumed foundered with the loss of all hands.
