= Trinity, Louisiana =

Unincorporated community in Catahoula Parish, Louisiana, United States

Coordinates: 31.6321°N 91.8109°W

Trinity is an unincorporated community (and former village) in Catahoula Parish, Louisiana, United States. It is described in a National Register of Historic Places nomination as a historically early community located at the confluence of the Tensas, Ouachita, and Little rivers, near present-day Jonesville. The area is prone to flooding.

== History ==
It was an early thriving community in Catahoula Parish, located at the confluence of the Tensas, Ouachita and Little rivers. The same source states that Trinity was incorporated as a village in 1850, but that nothing virtually survives of the old community as it developed in the early 20th century as the parish's largest population center. It has now gone from a municipality to an unincorporated area.

In 1895 a railroad from Vidalia, Louisiana opposite Natchez Louisiana to Trinity was "projected".

== Geography ==
Trinity is in the southern part of Catahoula Parish, in the vicinity of the confluence area where the Tensas, Ouachita, and Little rivers meet near Jonesville.
