= EG 4 Drie Gezusters =

Dutch pink

History

Netherlands
- Name: EG 4 Drie gezusters
- Out of service: 28 March 1895
- Fate: wrecked during storm

General characteristics
- Type: Bomschuit (pink)
- Crew: 6

EG 4 Drie gezusters, (in full in Dutch: Egmonder visserspink nr. 4 Drie gezusters), nicknamed Het Witneusje van meester Tijsma, was a Dutch fishing Bomschuit (pink) in the 19th-century. It is known for the rescue operation during a storm on 28 March 1895 whereby all persons on board were rescued by Blazer TX 119 Bertha.

== Fate and rescue ==
On the day of the storm of 28 March 1895 the ship was laid in Den Helder. During her third trip while fishing at Camperduin, the weather deteriorated, and skipper Hendrik Groen decided to go to Egmond. Because the weather became worse with wind force 8, it was not possible to sail to Egmond and it was decided to go to Den Helder instead. When they arrived at Den Helder it was already wind force 11. Due to poor sailing capacities of the crew, the port was missed. They dropped the anchor, but the rope broke. (Rescue workers later stated they didn’t dropped the anchor.) The ship drifted up the Texelstroom navigation channel. The boat was sighted at Texel by Jacob Kuiper. Together with nine others he went out with a boat of his brother, the Blazer TX 119 Bertha. The ship was one of the around 200 fishing boats in the harbour.

The TX 119 was able to reach the EG 4 without much problem, and all people were taken onboard. There was a defect while hoisting the sails for the return voyage. Kuiper climbed into the mast and solved the issue and so saved the lives of everybody. Over four hours later they arrived at Oudeschild. Upon arrival at 3 a.m., despite the bad weather, there were still people waiting on the beach and the ship was festively welcomed. The fishing gear was lost during the rescue. According to some reports the ship sank. According to another report the ship drifted to the Frisian mudflats and was sold there.

== Aftermath ==
The rescue workers were described as heroes. There names were published in the newspapers. Jacob Kuiper, Cornelis Zegel, Dirk Krijnen and Cornelis Krijnen, Jacob Koorn, Cornelis Duinker, Jan Duinker, Cornelis Koopman, Cornelis Blom and Gerrit Brouwer. On 22 September 1855 Jacob Kuiper was royally decorated with a silver medal and commendation. The other rescue workers received a bronze medal and commendation.

The owner of the boat was not very well off financially, and gear was lost during the rescue operation. A person who had red about the rescue sent a letter to the mayor of Texel with an amount of 25 Guilder for the rescue workers. Soon after the disaster, people had donated 79.50 Guilder for the rescue workers. The mayor of Texel Jan Carel Wendel Strick van Linschoten had written an extensive report to the King's Commissioner. However, the commissioner didn’t gave a monetary reward. The KNZHRM was asked if they could reimburse the lost gear. A month after the incident, the population had donated a total amount of 140.50 Guilder.

Lock keeper Thomas Zwamenburg made a painting of the rescue effort. The painting was presented by the Skippers and fishermen's association to the mayor during a special festive evening. A lithograph of the painting is at the Museum Kaap Skil along with a ship model of the blazer.
