= Lincoln =

Lincoln most commonly refers to:

- Abraham Lincoln (1809–1865), the 16th president of the United States
- Lincoln, England, cathedral city and county town of Lincolnshire, England
- Lincoln, Nebraska, the capital of Nebraska, U.S.
- Lincoln (name), a surname and given name
- Lincoln Motor Company, a Ford brand

Lincoln may also refer to:

== Places ==
=== Argentina ===
- Lincoln, Buenos Aires
- Lincoln Partido, Buenos Aires Province, a partido

=== Canada ===
- Lincoln, Alberta
- Lincoln, New Brunswick
- Lincoln Parish, New Brunswick
- Lincoln, Ontario
  - Lincoln (federal electoral district) (former), Ontario
  - Lincoln (provincial electoral district) (former), Ontario

=== New Zealand ===
- Lincoln, New Zealand, in the Selwyn District of the Canterbury Region
  - Lincoln Oval, an international cricket venue
- Lincoln, Auckland, a suburb of Auckland

=== United Kingdom ===
- Lincoln, England
  - Lincoln (UK Parliament constituency)
- Lincolnshire

=== United States ===
==== Cities, towns, and census-designated places ====
- Lincoln, Alabama
- Lincoln, Arkansas
- Lincoln, California, in Placer County
- Lincoln, former name of Clinton, California, in Amador County
- Lincoln, Delaware
- Lincoln, Idaho
- Lincoln, Illinois
- Lincoln, Indiana
- Lincoln, Iowa
- Lincoln Center, Kansas
- Lincoln Parish, Louisiana
- Lincoln, Maine, a New England town
  - Lincoln (CDP), Maine, the primary village in the town
- Lincoln Plantation, Maine
- Lincoln, Massachusetts
- Lincoln, Michigan, a village in Alcona County
- Lincoln, Washtenaw County, Michigan, an unincorporated community
- Lincoln, Missouri
- Lincoln, Minnesota
- Lincoln, Montana
- Lincoln, Nebraska, capital of the state
- Lincoln, New Hampshire
  - Lincoln (CDP), New Hampshire, the main village in the town
- Lincoln, Gloucester County, New Jersey
- Lincoln, New Mexico
- Lincoln, New York
- Lincoln, North Dakota
- Lincoln, Jackson County, Oregon
- Lincoln, Pennsylvania
- Lincoln, Rhode Island
- Lincoln, Texas
- Lincoln, Vermont
- Lincoln, Virginia
- Lincoln, Washington
- Lincoln, West Virginia
- Lincoln, Adams County, Wisconsin, a town
- Lincoln, Bayfield County, Wisconsin, a town
- Lincoln, Buffalo County, Wisconsin, a town
- Lincoln, Burnett County, Wisconsin, a town
- Lincoln, Eau Claire County, Wisconsin, a town
- Lincoln, Forest County, Wisconsin, a town
- Lincoln, Kewaunee County, Wisconsin, a town
  - Lincoln (community), Wisconsin, Kewaunee County town
- Lincoln, Monroe County, Wisconsin, a town
- Lincoln, Polk County, Wisconsin, a town
- Lincoln, Trempealeau County, Wisconsin, a town
- Lincoln, Vilas County, Wisconsin, a town
- Lincoln, Wood County, Wisconsin, a town

==== Proposed states ====
- Lincoln (proposed Northwestern state)
- Lincoln (proposed Southern state)

=== Elsewhere ===
- Lincoln, Tasmania, Australia
- Lincoln, Cuba
- Motu One (Marquesas Islands) or Lincoln, French Polynesia

== Arts, entertainment and media ==
=== Music ===
- Lincoln Records, an American record label in the 1920s
- Lincoln (album), 1988, by They Might Be Giants
- Lincoln (band), an American alternative rock band of the late 1990s

=== Television ===
- Lincoln or Carl Sandburg's Lincoln, a 1974 miniseries with Hal Holbrook
- Lincoln (miniseries), a 1988 American TV miniseries starring Sam Waterston
- Lincoln (TV series), a 2005–2013 Japanese variety television show

=== Other uses in art, entertainment, and media ===
- Lincoln (film), 2012, by Steven Spielberg
- Lincoln (novel), 1984, by Gore Vidal
- Lincoln (play), a 1906 Broadway play by Benjamin Chapin
- Lincoln, one of the Grounders in The 100 TV series
- Abraham Lincoln, a fictional U.S. Navy frigate in the novel Twenty Thousand Leagues Under the Seas
- Lincoln Island, a fictional island in Jules Verne's novel The Mysterious Island

== Businesses and brands ==
- Lincoln (surveillance), a brand of electronic data interception products
- Lincoln Electric, an American company
- Lincoln International, an investment banking firm
- Lincoln Logs, a children's toy
- Lincoln Motor Car Co, Australian automobile company 1919–1926
- Lincoln Motor Car Works, making cars sold exclusively by Sears Roebuck 1908–1912
- Lincoln Motor Company, the luxury brand of Ford Motor Company
- Lincoln National Corporation, an insurance company
- Lincoln Savings and Loan Association
- Lincoln Snacks Company

== Educational institutions ==
- Lincoln Academy (disambiguation)
- Lincoln Christ's Hospital School, Lincolnshire
- Lincoln College (disambiguation)
- Lincoln Elementary School (disambiguation)
- Lincoln Group of Schools, U.S.
- Lincoln High School (disambiguation)
- Lincoln Institute (disambiguation)
- Lincoln Junior High School (disambiguation)
- Lincoln Middle School (disambiguation)
- Lincoln School (disambiguation)
- Lincoln Tech, a group of schools in New Jersey, US
- Lincoln University (disambiguation)
- Old Lincoln High School, Tallahassee, Florida, US
- University of Lincoln, UK

== Military ==
- Avro Lincoln, a Second World War RAF bomber
- HMS Lincoln, several Royal Navy warships
- USS Abraham Lincoln, several US Navy vessels

== Sports ==
- Lincoln City F.C., an English football club
- Lincoln Red Imps F.C., a semi-professional football club of Gibraltar
- Lincoln (footballer, born 1979), Brazilian midfielder Lincoln Cássio de Souza Soares
- Lincoln (footballer, born 1996), Brazilian defender Lincoln Fernando Rocha da Silva
- Lincoln (footballer, born 1998), Brazilian midfielder Lincoln Henrique Oliveira dos Santos
- Lincoln (footballer, born 2000), Brazilian forward Lincoln Corrêa dos Santos

== Transport ==
=== Roads and bridges ===
- Lincoln Highway, South Australia
- Lincoln Highway, US
  - Lincoln Highway (Delaware)
  - Lincoln Highway (Omaha)
  - Lincoln Highway in Greene County, Iowa
- Lincoln Boulevard (disambiguation)
- Lincoln Bridge (disambiguation)
- Lincoln Drive, in Philadelphia
- Lincoln Tunnel, between New Jersey and New York
- Lincoln Way (San Francisco)

=== Other uses in transport ===
- Lincoln station (disambiguation)
- Lincoln Depot, a former railroad station in Springfield, Illinois where Abraham Lincoln gave his farewell address
- Lincoln (1914 automobile), built by the Lincoln Motor Car Company

== Other uses ==
- Lincoln Temple United Church of Christ, a church in Washington, D.C., US
- Lincoln (tree), a sequoia in Giant Forest, California
- Lincoln sheep
- Lincoln (grape) or Catawba grape
- Lincoln biscuit
- Lincoln cent, U.S. coinage
- Lincoln green, a color of dyed wool cloth

== See also ==
- Lincoln Cemetery (disambiguation)
- Lincoln Center (disambiguation)
- Lincoln City (disambiguation)
- Lincoln County (disambiguation)
- Lincoln Creek (disambiguation)
- Lincoln Green, Leeds
- Lincoln Heights (disambiguation)
- Lincoln House (disambiguation)
- Lincoln Memorial (disambiguation)
- Lincoln Museum (disambiguation)
- Lincoln Park (disambiguation)
- Lincoln Speedway (disambiguation)
- Lincoln Square (disambiguation)
- Lincoln Township (disambiguation)
- Lincoln Village (disambiguation)
- Camp Lincoln (disambiguation)
- Mount Lincoln (disambiguation), various mountains
- Port Lincoln, South Australia
