= SS Lincoln =

SS Lincoln is the name of the following ships:

- SS Lincoln (1883), sunk 1917
- SS Lincoln (1958), built by John Brown & Company, broken up in 1978
- SS Lincoln (1960), originally named President Lincoln

== See also ==
- SS Lincoln Victory
- HMS Lincoln
- USS Abraham Lincoln
- Lincoln (disambiguation)
