= Lincoln City =

Lincoln City can refer to:

- Lincoln City F.C., an association football club based in Lincoln, England
- Lincoln City, Oregon, a city on the Oregon Coast in the United States
- Lincoln City, Indiana, a settlement in southwestern Indiana
- Lincoln, Delaware, also known as Lincoln City
- Lincoln, England also known as The City Of Lincoln
- HMT Lincoln City, a British trawler that was bombed in the Faroe Islands in 1941

== See also ==
- Lincoln (disambiguation)
