= Lincoln Park (disambiguation) =

Lincoln Park is an urban park in Chicago, which gave its name to the Lincoln Park, Chicago community area.

Lincoln Park may also refer to:

== Parks ==
=== Urban parks ===
- Lincoln Park (Los Angeles), California
- Lincoln Park (San Francisco), California
- Lincoln Park (Washington, D.C.)
- Lincoln Park (Portland, Maine)
- Lincoln Park (Jersey City), New Jersey
- Lincoln Park (Albany), New York
- Lincoln Park (Cincinnati), Ohio
- Lincoln Park (Marion, Ohio)
- Lincoln Park (Youngstown, Ohio)
- Lincoln Park (Seattle), Washington

=== Amusement parks ===
- Lincoln Park (Dartmouth, Massachusetts), a former amusement park
- Lincoln Park (New Orleans), Louisiana, a former amusement park

== Communities ==
- Lincoln Park, Colorado, a census-designated place
- Lincoln Park, Georgia, a census-designated place
- Lincoln Park, Michigan, a city
- Lincoln Park, New Jersey, a borough
  - Lincoln Park Airport
- Lincoln Park, New York, a hamlet
- Lincoln Park, Pennsylvania, an unincorporated community
- Lincoln Park, Texas, a town

== Neighborhoods ==
=== Canada ===
- Lincoln Park, Calgary, Alberta

=== United States ===
- Lincoln Park, San Diego, California
- Lincoln Park, Denver, Colorado
- Lincoln Park, community in Fort Pierce, Florida
- Lincoln Park, Chicago, Illinois
- Lincoln Park, Rockville, Maryland
- Lincoln Park (Duluth), Minnesota
- Lincoln Park, Edison, New Jersey
- Lincoln Park/West Bergen, Jersey City, New Jersey
- Lincoln Park, Newark, New Jersey
- Lincoln Park, New Brunswick, New Jersey
- Lincoln Park, Syracuse, New York
- Lincoln Park Historic District (Pomona, California)
- Lincoln Park Historic District (Rocky Mount, North Carolina)

== Schools ==
- Lincoln Park Academy, Ft. Pierce, Florida
- Lincoln Park High School (Chicago, Illinois)
- Lincoln Park High School (Lincoln Park, Michigan)
- Lincoln Park Performing Arts Charter School, Midland, Pennsylvania

== See also ==
- Lincoln Park Zoo in Chicago
- Lincoln Park Zoo (Manitowoc), Wisconsin
- Lincoln National Park in South Australia
- Lincoln Greyhound Park, now Twin River Casino in Lincoln, Rhode Island
- Christine Emerson Reed Park, formerly Lincoln Park in Santa Monica, California
- Linkin Park, American rock band
- Parque Lincoln, in Mexico City
