= Colin Metters =

English conductor

Colin Metters is an English conductor, orchestral trainer and conducting pedagogue. He is Professor of Conducting at the Royal Academy of Music in London where he founded the Conductors' Course in 1983. In September 2013, he retired as Head of Studies after serving in the post for 30 years. He remains as Professor of Conducting at the Academy's Postgraduate Conductors' Course.

== Biography ==
Colin Metters was appointed Music Director of Ballet Rambert when he finished his studies at The Royal College of Music. Subsequently, he was appointed conductor with Sadlers Wells Royal Ballet and conducted for Sadlers Wells on tours in the UK and worldwide and conducted Gala concerts at Covent Garden. He has conducted for many of the world's leading dance companies, most recently for New York City Ballet at The Lincoln Centre.

Metters has conducted many of the major symphony orchestras in the United Kingdom and abroad in Poland, Spain, Germany, Australia, Singapore, Venezuela, United States, Hong Kong, Netherlands, France, Vietnam, Greece and New Zealand. He has conducted the first performances of pieces by composers Jonathan Harvey, John Lambert, Matthew Taylor, Augusta Read Thomas, Leonard Salzedo, Ewen Bennett, Tony Biggin, Adam Gorb, Nicola Lefanu and Robin Holloway. He has recorded and broadcast for radio and television UK, Germany, Spain and Vietnam. He has been Music Director of the East Sussex Youth Orchestra since its foundation in 1979.

In 1997, Metters was invited to visit Vietnam to conduct orchestras in Hanoi and Ho Chi Minh City. He was subsequently appointed Principal Guest Conductor and Music Advisor to the Vietnam National Symphony Orchestra. In recognition of his work with the VNSO he has been honoured by the Vietnamese Government with their equivalent of the Order of Merit for his services to Vietnamese Cultural Development, the first time such an award has been made to a British citizen. In November 2013 he conducted concerts with the Vietnam National Symphony Orchestra in Hanoi to celebrate 20 years of the work of the British Council in Vietnam.

He has given master classes in Germany, Russia, Poland, Switzerland, Finland, Australia, China, Portugal, Venezuela, Vietnam and the USA. He has worked extensively with Dirigenten Forum in Germany directing master classes and serving many times as a jury member. In 2008 he represented the UK on the jury for the 5th Prokofiev International Conducting Competition in St Petersburg. In 2014 he was jury on the Atlantic Coast International Conducting Competition in Portugal. Since 2014 professor Colin Metters collaborates with the Atlantic Coast Orchestra International Conducting Academy as principal guest conducting teacher.
