= Highway bridge =

Highway bridge may refer to:

- Highway Bridge (Potomac River)
- Any bridge traversed by a highway

== See also ==
- Lincoln Highway Bridge (disambiguation)
- Highway 2 Bridge, a bridge over the Kansas River in De Soto, Kansas
- Highway Ridge
