= Lincoln Highway (disambiguation) =

The Lincoln Highway is the first transcontinental highway across the United States.

Lincoln Highway or Lincoln Way may refer to:

- Lincoln Highway
  - Route of the Lincoln Highway including
    - Lincoln Highway in New York
    - Lincoln Highway in New Jersey
      - Lincoln Highway Hackensack River Bridge
      - Lincoln Highway Passaic River Bridge
    - Lincoln Highway in Delaware
    - Lincoln Highway in Pennsylvania
    - Lincoln Highway in West Virginia
    - Lincoln Highway in Ohio
    - Lincoln Highway in Indiana
    - Lincoln Highway in Illinois
    - Lincoln Highway in Iowa
      - Lincoln Highway Bridge (Tama, Iowa)
      - Lincoln Highway in Greene County, Iowa
    - Lincoln Highway in Nebraska
      - Lincoln Highway (Omaha)
    - Lincoln Highway in Colorado
    - Lincoln Highway in Wyoming
    - Lincoln Highway in Utah
      - Lincoln Highway Bridge (Dugway Proving Ground, Utah)
    - Lincoln Highway in Nevada
    - Lincoln Highway in California
- Lincoln Highway, South Australia
- Lincoln Way (San Francisco), a major thoroughfare in San Francisco, California
- Lincoln Tunnel, between New Jersey and New York
- The Lincoln Highway (novel), a 2021 novel by Amor Towles
- 211th Street/Lincoln Highway station, a rail station at Lincoln Highway in Olympia Fields, Illinois

== See also ==
- Lincoln Boulevard (disambiguation)
