= Lincoln Creek =

Lincoln Creek may refer to several places:

- Lincoln Creek (Nodaway River tributary), a stream in Missouri
- Lincoln Creek (Chehalis River), a stream in Washington
- Lincoln Creek (Colorado), a creek in Colorado, U.S.

== See also ==
- Lincoln (disambiguation)
