= Sebastian Knauer =

German classical pianist (born 1971)

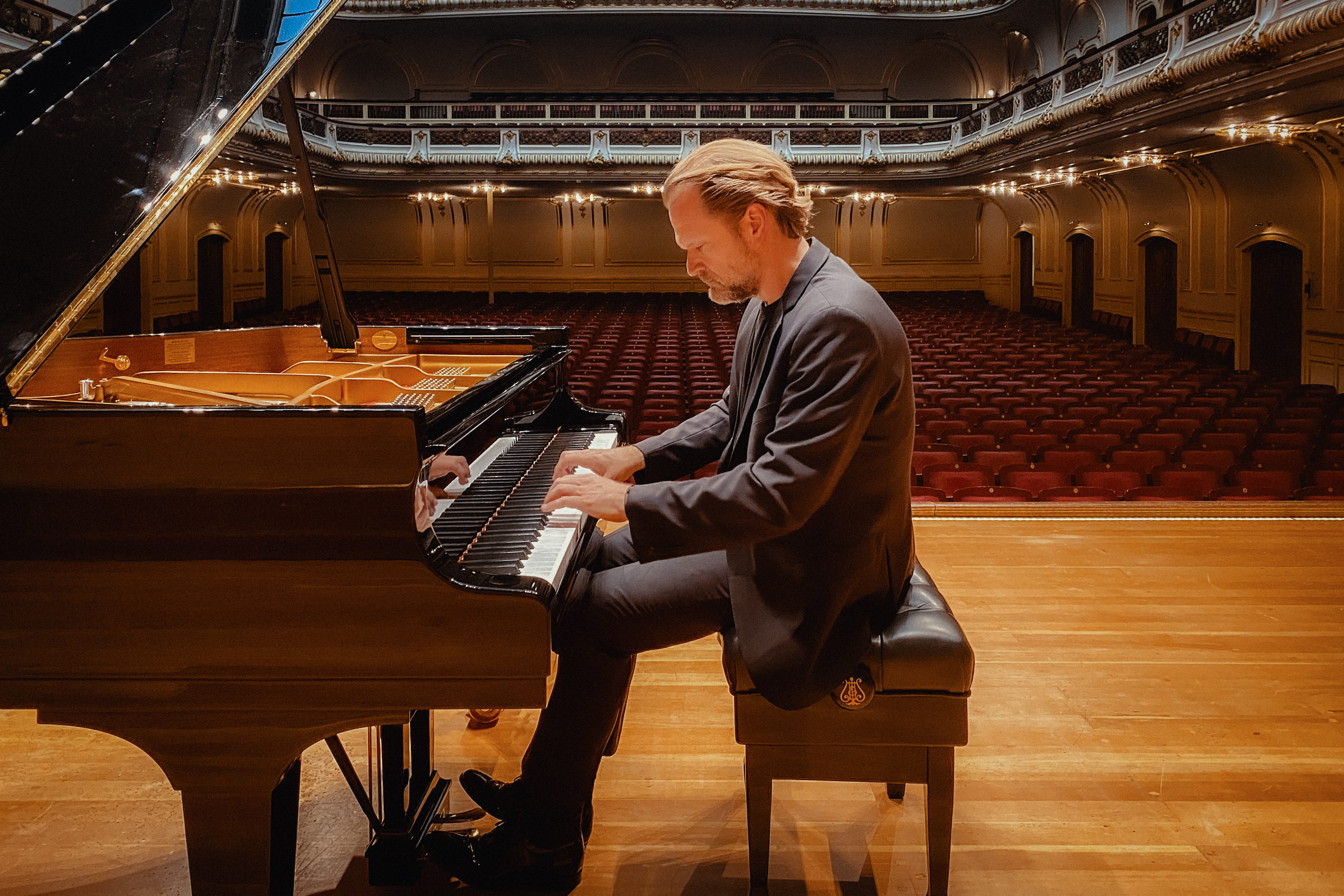
Sebastian Knauer at Laeiszhalle in Hamburg

Sebastian Knauer (born in Hamburg in 1971) is a German classical pianist.

== Early life and youth ==
Sebastian Knauer, born July 29, 1971, is from an old-established Hamburg-based business family. To this day, there is a memorial in honour of his forebear Georg Andreas Knauer (1759–1828) located on Eppendorfer Landstrasse at the corner of Loogestieg in Hamburg. A famous painting by Alexander Macco (1767–1849), who was acquainted with Ludwig van Beethoven and Johann Wolfgang von Goethe, portrays Georg Andreas Knauer surrounded by his family. Sebastian Knauer's father Wolfgang Knauer (1942–2018) was a journalist and worked for many years for the Norddeutscher Rundfunk broadcaster, including as Head of the NDR Kultur programme; he was also the initiator and editor of a popular satirical radio show. His mother, Christa Knauer, was awarded the Bundesverdienstkreuz (Federal Cross of Merit) for her services to the voluntary sector in Germany. Sebastian Knauer began taking piano lessons at the age of five. He was soon declared a child prodigy and in 1985 opened the Congress for Highly Talented Children in Hamburg. He gave his stage debut in 1984 in the Laeiszhalle in Hamburg. He was awarded the prestigious Eduard Söring Prize by the Hamburg State Opera Trust when he was only 17 years of age. He studied in Hamburg with Professor Gernot Kahl, who was able in turn to pass on the subtlety of touch that he had learned from his teachers Edwin Fischer and Géza Anda. Sebastian Knauer also studied with Professor Karl Heinz Kämmerling in Hanover and also took instruction from Philippe Entremont, under whose guiding hand he has given recitals worldwide, sometimes in duets for two pianos. He also attended courses given by Sir András Schiff and Alexis Weissenberg. Sebastian Knauer lives with his wife and two children in Hamburg.

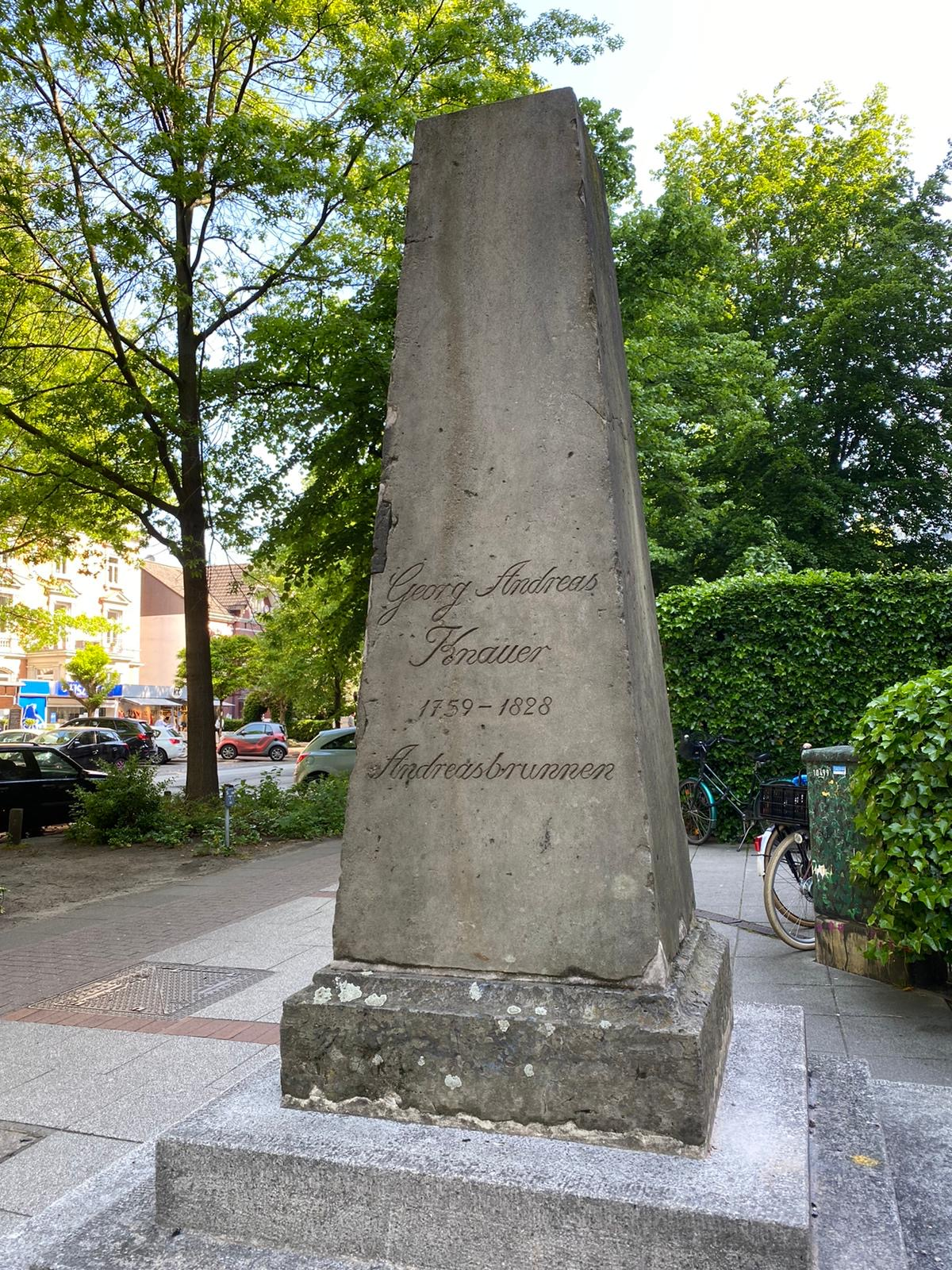
Memorial for Andreas Georg Knauer in Hamburg Eppendorf

== Pianistic artistry ==
He has enjoyed a close working relationship and friendship over many years with the British conductor Sir Roger Norrington. In 2006 they released a Mozart CD together with the Camerata Salzburg on the Warner Classics label that was judged by the German weekly newspaper DIE ZEIT as one of the very best Mozart recordings of all time. Between 1999 and 2001 Sebastian Knauer directed and performed in Hamburg a concert cycle specially conceived for him featuring all of W.A: Mozart's 27 piano concertos together with the Philharmonisches Staatsorchester Hamburg. In 2009 he performed and directed from the keyboard all of Joseph Haydn's piano concertos together with the Bamberg Symphony Orchestra. Time and again, the press has given very favourable feedback about his sensitive touch at the keyboard and the sound of his playing.

"Sparkling lightness of touch" (Rondo Magazin)

"Magically" (Gramophone Magazine)

"A touch of rare refinement" (Diapason)

"In a class of his own" (Arte TV)

"An amazing range of colours in his pianistic palette" (Frankfurter Allgemeine)

Sebastian Knauer frequently gives master classes while on tour in Germany, France, Italy, Japan and China.

== Career so far ==
Concert tours have taken him throughout all of Europe, the US, South America and Asia. He has given recitals in over 50 countries on 5 continents, performing at famous venues, even in the early years of his career: 1991 Laeiszhalle Hamburg, Philharmonic State Orchestra Hamburg, conductor Gerd Albrecht, Robert Schumann's Piano Concerto op. 54 1994 Gewandhaus Leipzig, MDR Symphony Orchestra, conductor Philippe Entremont, W.A. Mozart's Piano Concerto K537 1995 Musikverein Vienna, NDR Symphony Orchestra, conductor Vladimir Fedoseyev, Igor Stravinsky Petrushka 1996 Gewandhaus Leipzig, MDR Symphony Orchestra, conductor Neeme Järvi, W.A. Mozart Piano Concerto K459 1997 Concertgebouw Amsterdam, Netherlands Chamber Orchestra, conductor Philippe Entremont, George Gershwin "Rhapsody in Blue" 1998 Lincoln Center Festival New York, Leonard Bernstein "Anniversaries" for piano in the ballet revue "Bernstein Dances" by John Neumeier 2001 Beethovenfest Bonn, Philharmonic State Orchestra Hamburg, conductor Ingo Metzmacher, Charles Ives' Fourth Symphony 2002 Salzburg Festival, Grosser Saal Mozarteum, Recital with Daniel Hope 2007 Concertgebouw Amsterdam, Netherlands Philharmonic Orchestra, conductor Jaap van Zweden, Mozart Double Concerto K315 2008 Philharmonie Köln, Staatskapelle Dresden, conductor Fabio Luisi, L.v. Beethoven Piano Concerto No. 1 op. 15 2017 The CD recording of ÜberBach, composed for him by Arash Safaian, won him the ECHO Klassik award; the CD was in the German classical charts (at no. 11) for several weeks and in the iTunes charts (no. 57)

== Commitment to Classical Music ==
Sebastian Knauer has proved to have a visionary flair when it comes to opening up to new genres; he also develops projects of his own in which he casts a new light on classical music. For instance, in 2000 he launched a series called "Wort trifft Klassik" (the spoken word meets classical music) with the German actress Hannelore Elsner (1942–2019), including a programme he devised, entitled "George Sand and Frédéric Chopin - A Winter on Mallorca, the truth!". Since then he has pursued over 50 further projects of this kind with actors such as Martina Gedeck, Hannelore Hoger, Iris Berben, Katja Riemann, Klaus Maria Brandauer and Ulrich Tukur. In 2018 he undertook a concert tour to mark the 100th birthday of Leonard Bernstein, together with the maestro's daughter Jamie Bernstein, which took them to Germany, the US and Canada, in a programme that featured spoken-word and musical tributes to the composer and conductor.

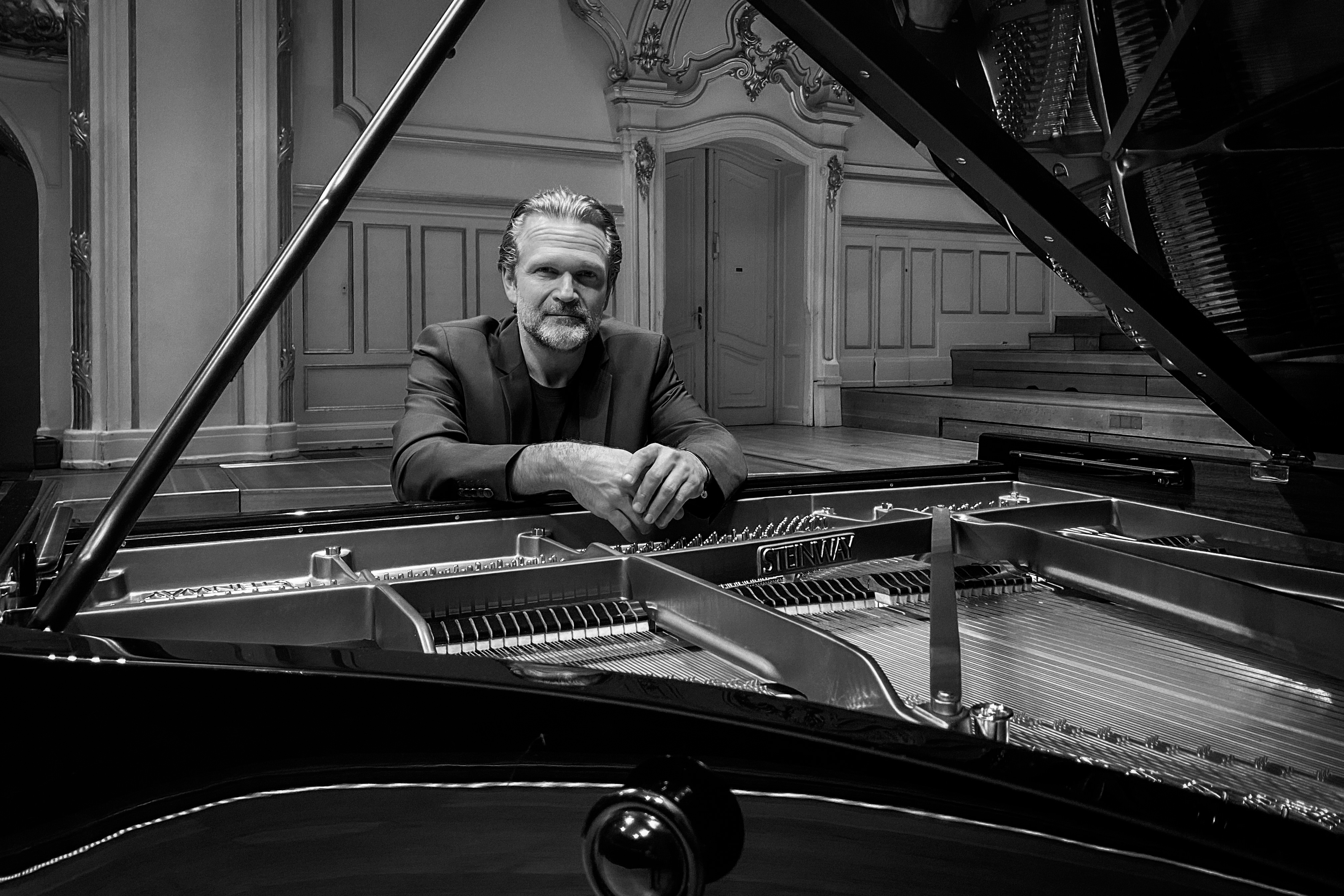
Sebastian Knauer

In 2016 he was a co-founder of the "Hamburg Piano Summer" festival project, in which he combined four different genres in one concert together with the pianists Martin Tingvall, Axel Zwingenberger and Joja Wendt; since then, the event has taken place annually. Sebastian Knauer founded the "mozart@augsburg" Festival in 2011, and he has been its artistic director from the outset. Since 2017 he has also been artistic director of the International Music Festival at Schloss Berleburg under the auspices of the Danish Princess Benedikte. In 2020 he launched another festival in the city of Aachen under the name "Ludwig FUN Beethoven", of which he is also artistic director. This festival has had to be postponed until 2021 due to the COVID-19 pandemic. He possesses a passion for chamber music, which he shares by regularly partnering artists such as the Emerson String Quartet, Daniel Hope, Renaud Capuçon, Sabine Meyer, Albrecht Mayer, Sol Gabetta, Anne Sofie von Otter and the late Hermann Prey.

== Repertoire ==
Sebastian Knauer, whose wide-ranging and extensive repertoire stretches from the Baroque to the modern era, often brings together a unique collection of works in his programmes for concert and CD, thereby enhancing the high repertoire value of even well known works. Furthermore, Arash Safaian has composed two concerto cycles especially for him: "ÜberBach" (2016) and "This is (not) Beethoven - Variations for Piano & Orchestra" (2019). In 1998 Sebastian Knauer released his debut CD, dedicated to the entire solo piano works of George Gershwin, including the seldom-heard solo version of Rhapsody in Blue. In 1999 he threw light on the Mozart family by combining father and son and recording a hitherto hardly known piano concerto by Wolfgang Amadeus Mozart's son Franz Xaver. He has researched the three great American composers Leonard Bernstein, Aaron Copland and Samuel Barber in detail and introduced many little known works to the repertoire, as was the case with the Bernstein Anniversaries. In 2004 he recorded, together with the violinist Daniel Hope, a CD entitled "East meets West", on which he played a replica of an instrument invented by Maurice Ravel, the luthéal. 2007 saw the release of a world premiere recording of a forgotten Schubert sonata, the "Sonate Oubliée", discovered by Jörg Demus. In 2009 he dedicated a recording to the piano works – and thus the "songs without words" – of Felix Mendelssohn, resulting in yet another CD featuring world premieres. On "Bach & Sons" and "Bach & Sons 2" he made a comparison of the keyboard concertos of Johann Sebastian Bach and his sons Carl Philipp Emanuel and Johann Christian. Through research he discovered that Mozart's last and Beethoven's first piano concertos originated in the same year – a combination which he recorded and released – a world first to this day.

== Orchestras and Concerts ==
Sebastian Knauer has performed on stage at many famous venues such as the Berlin Konzerthaus and the Philharmonie in Berlin, Cologne and Munich, the Gewandhaus Leipzig, the Concertgebouw in Amsterdam, London's Wigmore Hall, the Théâtre des Champs-Elysées in Paris, the Zurich Tonhalle, Vienna's Konzerthaus, the Auditori Barcelona, Sala Verdi in Milan, and, further afield, the Lincoln Center in New York, the Koerner Hall Toronto, the Herbst Theater in San Francisco, Knight Concert Hall Miami, the Théatro Municipal in both São Paulo and Rio de Janeiro, the Oriental Concert Hall in Shanghai, NCPA Beijing, the Forbidden City Concert Hall in Beijing, Toppan Hall Tokyo and the Performing Arts Center in Hong Kong. He has performed with many orchestras, including the NDR Elbphilharmonie Orchestra, the Konzerthausorchester Berlin, Philharmonia Zurich, the Bournemouth Symphony, the Sofia Philharmonic Orchestra, the Orchestre de Chambre de Paris, Vienna Chamber Orchestra, Camerata Salzburg, Chamber Orchestra of Europe, Israel Chamber Orchestra, New York City Opera Orchestra, New Century Chamber Orchestra San Francisco and the Shanghai Philharmonic, under conductors including Thomas Hengelbrock, Simone Young, Michael Sanderling, Markus Poschner, Thomas Dausgaard and Alexander Shelley.

He is a regular guest at music festivals such as the Schleswig Holstein Music Festival, the Mecklenburg-West Pomerania Music Festival, the Rheingau Music Festival, the Ruhr Piano Festival, Beethoven Festival in Bonn, Musikfest Bremen, Schubertiade Hohenems, Jeunesse in Vienna, the Salzburg Festival, Menuhin Festival Gstaad, Septembre Musical Vevey/Montreux, Bath's Mozart Festival, Festival de Colmar, Lincoln Center Festival New York, Ravinia Festival, Savannah Music Festival, Santo Domingo Festival and the Shanghai Arts Festival.

== Trivia ==
On July 13, 2017, together with the Hamburger Abendblatt newspaper, he organised a special concert for more than 1000 police officers and their partners in the Great Hall of the Elbphilharmonie in Hamburg. He called the concert "RESPEKT" as a mark of respect for their difficult task of containing the violent clashes that took place during the G20 Summit in his native city. In no time at all, he obtained support from numerous sponsors and was able to stage the concert in the first year of operation at perhaps the world's most famous concert house. Together with the Zurich Chamber Orchestra and Pascal Schumacher he performed Arash Safaian's "Überbach". For this concert, the Hamburg Police Department awarded Sebastian Knauer their "Police Star 2018". 2003 saw Sebastian Knauer perform at an open air benefit concert in Shanghai for the victims of the SARS epidemic in China; this was broadcast all over the country and highly acclaimed. His performance was seen as a gesture of sympathy and solidarity with the city of Hamburg's partner city. In 2002 he played for President Bill Clinton at a reception given for "Werkstatt Deutschland" on the occasion of the 12th anniversary of the reunification of Germany at the Hotel Adlon Berlin.

== Discography ==
- 2020 "This is (not) Beethoven" Variations for Piano & Orchestra by Arash Safaian (BMG/ Modern Recordings)
- 2020 L.v. Beethoven Works for Violin & Piano with Daniel Hope (Deutsche Grammophon)
- 2016 Portrait featuring works by J.S. Bach, F. Mendelssohn, W.A. Mozart, F. Chopin and F. Schubert (Berlin Classics)
- 2016 Bach & Sons II with works by J.S. Bach, J.C. Bach and C.P.E. Bach (Berlin Classics)
- 2016 ÜberBach by Arash Safaian (Berlin Classics/Neue Meister)
- 2013 Vienna 1789 with works by W.A. Mozart, J. Haydn, L. van Beethoven (Berlin Classics)
- 2011 Bach & Sons featuring works by J.S. Bach, J.C. Bach and C.P.E. Bach (Berlin Classics)
- 2001 J. Brahms, C. Schumann, J. Joachim, Violin & Piano, Daniel Hope (Deutsche Grammophon)
- 2009 Pure Mendelssohn (Berlin Classics)
- 2007 Franz Schubert, Piano Works (Berlin Classics)
- 2007 Joseph Haydn, Piano Concertos (Naxos)
- 2007 Felix Mendelssohn, Lieder for Violin and Piano, Daniel Hope (Deutsche Grammophon)
- 2006 Harlekin sucht Columbine, Mozart and the Ladies (Berlin Classics)
- 2005 W.A. Mozart, Piano Concertos (Warner Classics)
- 2004 East meets West, with works by B. Bartok, M. Ravel, A. Schnittke, R. Shankar with Daniel Hope (Warner Classics)
- 2004 In einem Weltmeer von Harmonie – Bettina von Arnim und Ludwig van Beethoven (Deutsche Grammophon)
- 2002 A Winter on Mallorca – The Truth, with music by F. Chopin (Berlin Classics)
- 2001 Samuel Barber, Leonard Bernstein, Aaron Copland (Berlin Classics)
- 2000 Nocturnes*Träumerein*Reveries with works by E. Satie, J.S. Bach, F. Chopin, J. Brahms, L. van Beethoven, P. Tchaikovsky, F. Mendelssohn, C. Debussy, F. Schubert and R. Schumann (Glissando)
- 1999 W.A. Mozart / Franz Xaver Mozart – Piano Concertos (Berlin Classics)
- 1998 Bernstein Dances (Deutsche Grammophon)
- 1998 Franz Schubert – Piano Works (Berlin Classics)
- 1998 George Gershwin – Rhapsody in Blue (Glissando)
