= Rufus Payne =

American singer (1883–1939)

- Also known as: Tee Tot
- Born: February 4, 1883; Greenville, Alabama, US
- Origin: Montgomery, Alabama, US
- Died: March 17, 1939 (aged 56) Montgomery, Alabama, US
- Genres: Blues, gospel, country
- Occupations: Singer-songwriter, musician
- Instruments: Vocals, guitar

Rufus "Tee Tot" Payne (February 4, 1883 – March 17, 1939) was an early-20th-century African-American blues musician from Greenville, Alabama.

Payne's nickname of "Tee Tot" is an ironic pun for "teetotaler". It is said that Payne received his nickname because he usually carried a homemade mixture of alcohol and tea wherever he went.

== Early life ==
According to Alabama historian Alice Harp, Payne was born in 1883 on the Payne Plantation in Sandy Ridge, Lowndes County, Alabama.

== Career and influence ==
Some say Tee Tot played the blues alone; others state that he led a little combo that played pop songs and hokum numbers and was a street musician.

Tee Tot is best known for being a mentor to Hank Williams. Rufus Payne met Hank Williams when Hank was eight years old, and legend has it that he would come around and play Hank's guitar, showing Hank how to improvise chords. His influence in exposing Williams to blues and other African American influences helped Williams successfully fuse hillbilly, folk and blues into his own unique style, which in turn expanded and exposed both white and black audiences to the differing sounds.

== Death ==
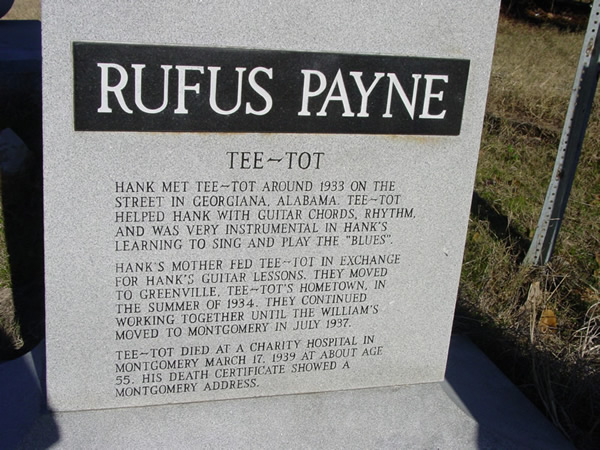
Rufus Payne was buried in Lincoln Cemetery in Montgomery, Alabama. This is the marker placed near his final resting place.

Payne died at a charity hospital in Montgomery, Alabama, on March 17, 1939, at the age of 56. He is buried at Lincoln Cemetery in Montgomery; as the exact location of his gravesite is unknown, a memorial to him stands near the entrance to the cemetery, paid for by Hank Williams Jr. and other members of the Grand Ole Opry.

== Tributes ==
Hank Williams, Jr. paid tribute to Tee Tot's influence on his father through "The Tee Tot Song" on his Almeria Club album.

He was portrayed by actor Rex Ingram in the 1964 Hank Williams biopic Your Cheatin' Heart.
