= Lincoln Cemetery =

Lincoln Cemetery may refer to:

- Lincoln Cemetery (Cook County), Illinois
- Lincoln Cemetery (Harrisburg, Pennsylvania)
- Lincoln Cemetery (Montgomery, Alabama)
