= Winthrop Street Baptist Church =

Historic church in Massachusetts, United States

- U.S. National Register of Historic Places
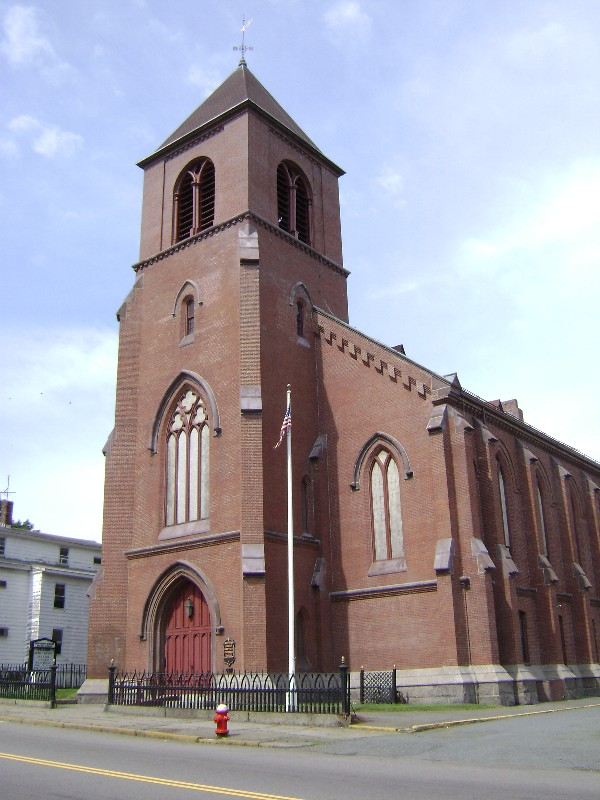

- Location within Massachusetts Location within the United States
- Location: Taunton, Massachusetts
- Coordinates: 41°54′1″N 71°5′46″W
- Built: 1862
- Architectural style: Late Gothic Revival
- MPS: Taunton MRA
- NRHP reference No.: 84002291
- Added to NRHP: July 5, 1984

Winthrop Street Baptist Church is a historic Baptist church located at 39 Winthrop Street in Taunton, Massachusetts, USA. The Late Gothic Revival church was built in 1862 and was the second Baptist church built on the site. It was added to the National Register of Historic Places in 1984.

== Description and history ==
The Winthrop Street Baptist Church is set on the west side of Winthrop Street (United States Route 44), across the Mill River from the heart of downtown Taunton. It is a single-story structure, built out of brick with brownstone trim. It has a gable, roof, and a square tower projects from the front (east-facing) facade. The main entrance is at the base of the tower, set in a Gothic-arched opening with brownstone drip molding. This molding detail and Gothic styling is repeated on most of the church's windows. The tower has buttresses at the corners, and the sides of the building are similarly buttressed. Above the main entrance is a large Gothic-arched stained glass window in the tower's tall second stage, above which stands the belfry, with louvered round-arch openings. The tower is topped by a pyramidal roof.

The church was built in 1862, and is one of the city's finest examples of mid-19th century ecclesiastical architecture. Its integrity has been compromised, however, since the demolition in 1994 of its original steeple, and the local historical commission believes it is therefore no longer eligible for listing on the National Register of Historic Places.

== See also ==
- National Register of Historic Places listings in Taunton, Massachusetts
- North Taunton Baptist Church
