= Lincoln Junior – Senior High School =

Lincoln Junior and Senior High School or Lincoln Junior – Senior High School (LJSHS) can refer to:

- Lincoln Junior - Senior High School (Indiana), Cambridge City, Indiana
- Lincoln Junior-Senior High School, Lincoln Unified School District 298, Lincoln, Kansas
- Lincoln Junior Senior High School, Ellwood City, Pennsylvania, Ellwood City Area School District
- Abraham Lincoln Junior and Senior High School (now Gregory-Lincoln Education Center), Houston, Texas
- Lincoln Junior-Senior High School, Alma Center, Wisconsin, Alma Center-Humbird-Merrillan School District

== See also ==
- Lincoln Junior High School (disambiguation)
