= Lincoln station =

Lincoln station may refer to:

- Lincoln Depot, a former railroad station in Springfield, Illinois where Abraham Lincoln gave his farewell address
- Lincoln railway station, in Lincoln, England
- Lincoln St Marks railway station, a closed station in Lincoln, England
- Lincoln station (Illinois), an Amtrak station in Lincoln, Illinois, United States
- Lincoln station (MBTA), a commuter rail station in Lincoln, Massachusetts, United States
- Lincoln station (Nebraska), an Amtrak station in Lincoln, Nebraska, United States
- Lincoln station (RTD), a light rail station in Lone Tree, Colorado, United States
- Lincoln station (SkyTrain), a rapid transit station in Coquitlam, British Columbia, Canada

== See also ==
- Lincoln (disambiguation)
