= North Taunton Baptist Church =

Historic church in Massachusetts, United States

- U.S. National Register of Historic Places
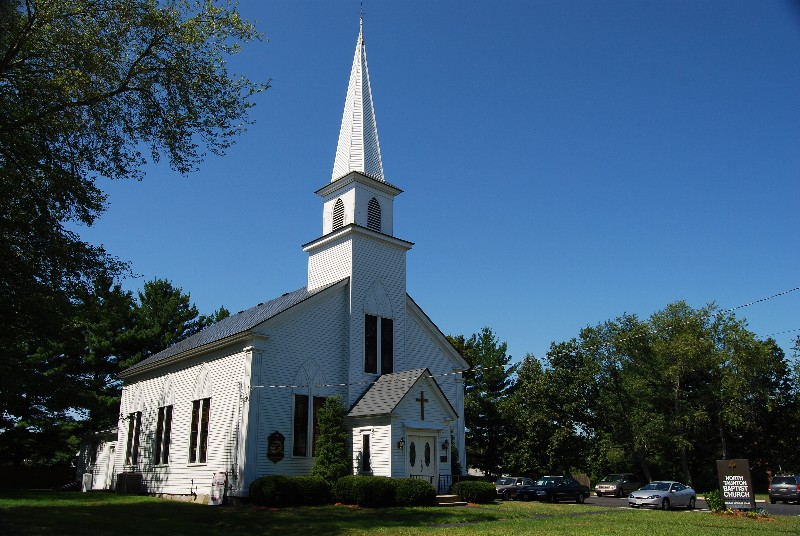

- Location within Massachusetts Location within the United States
- Location: Taunton, Massachusetts
- Coordinates: 41°54′52″N 71°5′41″W
- Built: 1837
- Architectural style: Federal
- MPS: Taunton MRA
- NRHP reference No.: 84002188
- Added to NRHP: July 5, 1984

North Taunton Baptist Church is a historic Baptist church located at 1940 Bay Street in Taunton, Massachusetts. The small Federal era church was constructed in 1837, in what was a still very rural part of Taunton containing mostly farmland.

It was added to the National Register of Historic Places in 1984.

== Description and history ==
The North Taunton Baptist Church is located on the southwest side of Bay Street, a major north–south road (dating to colonial times) that connects Taunton to points north. It is set between junctions with Crane Avenue North and Field Street. It is a single-story wood-frame structure, with a gable roof and clapboard siding. A two-stage square tower projects slightly from the front facade, rising through a tall first section to a cornice, above which is a belfry section with louvered Gothic-arched openings. An octagonal steeple topped by a weathervane completes the tower. The main entrance is set in a gabled-roofed vestibule projecting from the tower. Windows on the front and the sides are paired, with a tripartite Gothic-arched panel above each pair.

The Baptist congregation in Taunton developed as early as 1747, as an informal gathering aligned with the Baptists in nearby Rehoboth. The group later held services in the North Taunton home of Jeremiah Bassett. In 1769, the congregation was formally organized. The church later moved to Weir Village, using a warehouse there for services until the North Taunton church was built in 1837.

In 1819, a group split off to form the Winthrop Street Baptist Church near Taunton center. Then, in 1822, another split occurred within the church between the Calvinists, who founded their own church in Norton, and the Free Will Baptists, who settled in North Taunton. Thus, the North Taunton Baptist Church is often considered the "mother church" of Baptists in the Taunton area.

== See also ==
- National Register of Historic Places listings in Taunton, Massachusetts
- Ambrose Lincoln, Jr., House
