= Cream, Wisconsin =

- Unincorporated community
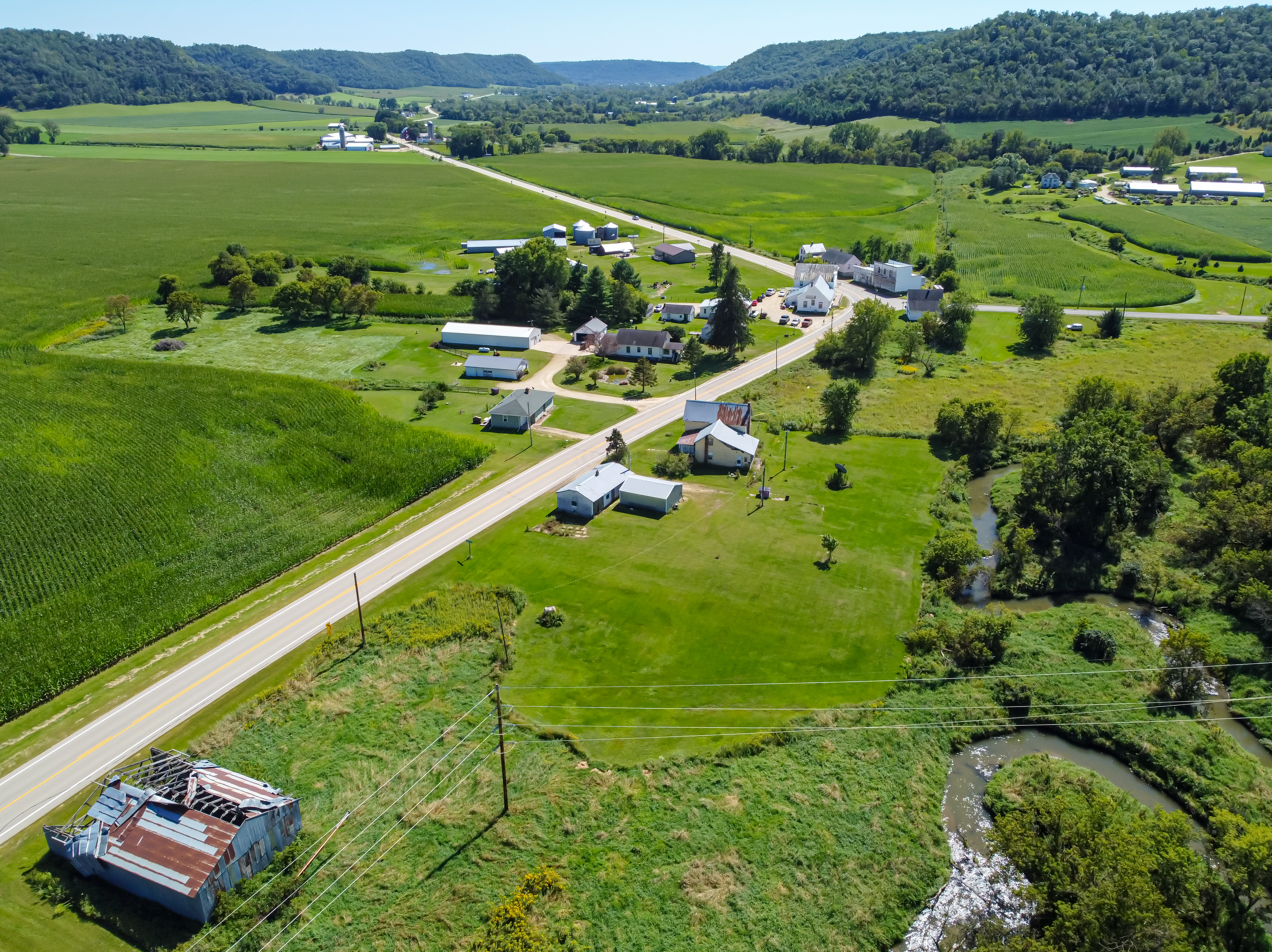

- Location within Wisconsin Location within the United States
- Coordinates: 44°18′58″N 91°46′19″W
- Country: United States
- State: Wisconsin
- County: Buffalo
- Town: Lincoln
- Elevation: 764 ft (233 m)
- Time zone: UTC-6 (Central (CST))
  - Summer (DST): UTC-5 (CDT)
- Area codes: 715 & 534
- GNIS feature ID: 1563518

Cream is an unincorporated community located in the town of Lincoln, in Buffalo County, Wisconsin, United States. Cream is located on Wisconsin Highway 88, 7 miles (11 km) northeast of Cochrane.

== 2026 Tornado ==
On April 17 2026, an EF3 tornado tracked south of Cream, causing moderate damage to houses and structures on the southern parts of the town as wind damage caused a minor power outage. The tornado initiated near Blank Hill Road, moving northeastward with the parent supercell. The tornado experienced several changes in elevation as it moved through the hilly countryside, crossing Block Road and several other small country roads before crossing State Road 88, directly impacting a home along the western side of the State Road at EF3 intensity. From here, the tornado deviated further east and paralleled County Road EE. before crossing over the street at extremely low intensity. The tornado continued into Hunts Valley, where it crossed Stoltz Road before terminating just east of County Road U. No injuries or deaths were reported from Cream, Wisconsin as a result of the tornado.
