= Lincoln House =

Lincoln House may refer to:

== United States ==
(by state)

- Lincoln Home National Historic Site, Springfield, Illinois
- Lincoln Boyhood National Memorial, Lincoln City, Indiana
- Harlan-Lincoln House, Mount Pleasant, Iowa
- Knob Creek Farm, Athertonville, Kentucky, also known as Lincoln Boyhood Home
- Abraham Lincoln Birthplace National Historic Site, Hodgenville, Kentucky
- Mary Todd Lincoln House, Lexington, Kentucky
- Mordecai Lincoln House (Springfield, Kentucky)
- Lincoln House (Dennysville, Maine)
- Lincoln House Club, Barnstable, Massachusetts
- General Benjamin Lincoln House, Hingham, Massachusetts
- Lincoln House (Lincoln, Massachusetts), Lincoln, Massachusetts
- Ambrose Lincoln Jr. House, Taunton, Massachusetts
- Asa Lincoln House, Taunton, Massachusetts
- Gen. Thomas Lincoln House, Taunton, Massachusetts
- Gov. Levi Lincoln House, Worcester, Massachusetts
- Lincoln School (Owosso, Michigan), Owosso, Michigan
- Anselm Lincoln House, Malone, New York
- Mordecai Lincoln House (Lorane, Pennsylvania)
- Lincoln House (Stickney, South Dakota)
- John J. Lincoln House, Elkhorn, West Virginia

== Australia ==
- Lincoln House, Melbourne, former name of Lincoln Institute of Health Sciences, now a faculty of La Trobe University, Melbourne
- Lincoln House, Sydney, an office building designed by Spain and Cosh, now home to Sydney Mechanics' School of Arts

== India ==
- Lincoln House (Mumbai), Breach Candy, Mumbai, former location of the US Consulate General, Mumbai

== UK ==
- Lincoln House plc, former name of a listed company
