= Grizzly Reservoir =

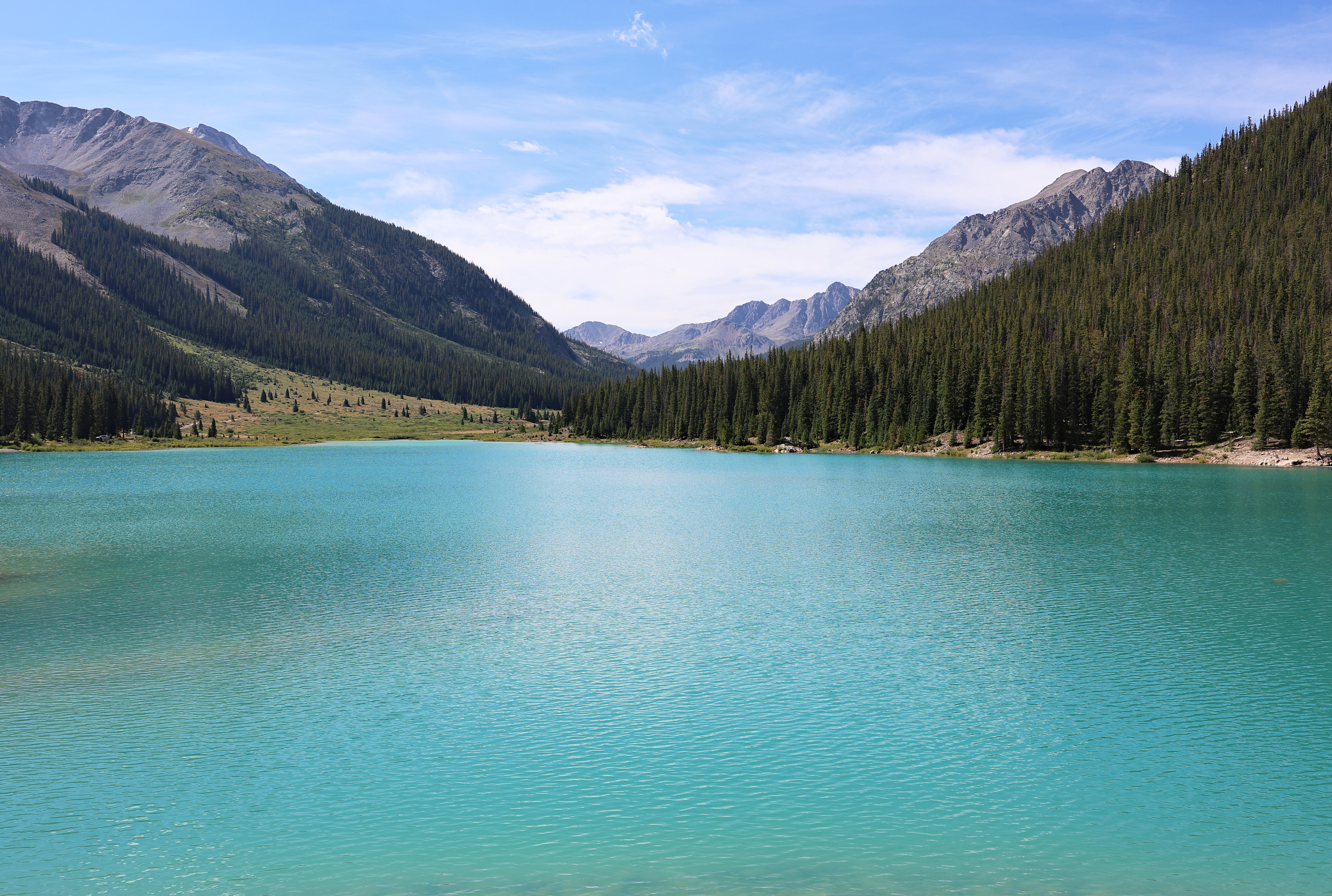
- The reservoir in 2025

- The reservoir's location in Colorado
- Location: Pitkin County, Colorado, U.S.
- Coordinates: 39°04′39.56″N 106°36′52.86″W
- Type: reservoir
- Etymology: Named for nearby Grizzly Creek
- Primary inflows: Grizzly Creek; Lincoln Creek; Lincoln Gulch Connection Canal; New York Collection Canal
- Primary outflows: Lincoln Creek; Twin Lakes Reservoir and Canal Company Tunnel Number 1
- Basin countries: United States
- Managing agency: Twin Lakes Reservoir and Canal Company
- Built: 1930
- Surface area: 69 acres (28 hectares)
- Water volume: 1,925 acre-feet (2,374,000 cubic meters)
- Surface elevation: 10,542 feet (3,213 meters)

Grizzly Reservoir lies in a remote, alpine area of Pitkin County, Colorado, U.S. The reservoir, which is at an elevation of 10,542 feet (3,213 meters) in Colorado's Sawatch Range, is surrounded by the White River National Forest and the Collegiate Peaks Wilderness. The reservoir collects and stores water from various creeks and canals and transfers it through a tunnel across the Continental Divide to users in the Front Range Urban Corridor.

== Dam ==
Grizzly Dam, NID ID CO01545, is a 65-foot (20-meter) high rockfill dam that can store up to 987 acre-feet (1,217,000 cubic meters) of water. It was built in 1930 and is 792 feet (241 meters) wide. The dam and reservoir are owned by the Twin Lakes Reservoir and Canal Company.

== Independence Pass Transmountain Diversion System ==
The reservoir is the centerpiece of the Independence Pass Transmountain Diversion System, a transbasin diversion that collects water from a 45-square-mile (120-square-kilometer) area surrounding the Roaring Fork River headwaters and conveys it to shareholders of the Twin Lakes Reservoir and Canal Company on the east side of the continental divide. Grizzly Reservoir receives water from the Roaring Fork River, Lost Man Creek, Lincoln Creek, Brooklyn Creek, Tabor Creek, New York Creek and Grizzly Creek. A diversion dam on the upper Roaring Fork channels water from the Roaring Fork River and Lost Man Creek into a tunnel that empties into the Lincoln Gulch Connection Canal and then into Grizzly Reservoir. A canal, called the New York Collection Canal, gathers water from Brooklyn Creek, Tabor Creek and New York Creek and delivers it to Grizzly Reservoir. The Twin Lakes Reservoir and Canal Company Tunnel Number 1 then conveys water from Grizzly Reservoir under the continental divide to North Fork Lake Creek in Lake County, Colorado. From there the water is distributed to shareholders, which include municipalities such as Aurora, Colorado Springs, Pueblo and others, and to farmers who use the Colorado Canal in eastern Colorado, one of the shareholders, for irrigation. Currently, the system transfers 38,000 acre-feet (47,000,000 cubic meters) each year to Eastern Colorado, but the project has water rights enabling it to deliver up to 46,000 acre-feet (57,000,000 cubic meters) annually.

== Camping and hiking ==
Lincoln Creek Road provides access to the reservoir from Colorado State Highway 82. The U.S. Forest Service maintains campsites along the road and also has a campground with five campsites called Portal Campground at the south end of the reservoir. The road to the reservoir is narrow and rocky. The Forest Service recommends that only four-wheel drive vehicles with a high clearance use the road.

Grizzly Lake Trail #1990 has its trailhead near the reservoir. It leads to a small lake near Grizzly Peak.
