= Camp Lincoln =

Camp Lincoln may refer to:

- Camp Lincoln (Arizona Territory) or Camp on the Verde River, an outpost of Fort Whipple
- Camp Lincoln (California), a United States military post in Crescent City, California
- Camp Lincoln (Illinois), a United States military post in Springfield, Illinois that includes the Camp Lincoln Commissary Building
- Camp Lincoln (Iowa), a United States military post in or near Keokuk, Iowa
- Camp Lincoln (Kansas), a Union Army base near Leavenworth
- Camp Lincoln (Massachusetts)
- Camp Lincoln (New Hampshire)
