= Lincoln (surveillance) =

Lincoln, manufactured by the company Pen-Link, Ltd., is a class of electronic data interception products—including both computer hardware and software packages—whose function is to extract and analyze internet traffic for mass surveillance purposes, such as those outlined under the Communications Assistance For Law Enforcement Act (CALEA).

Lincoln systems enable law enforcement and intelligence agencies to monitor numerous types of intercepted electronic communications—including telephone (landline & wireless), VoIP, 3G and IP (web/email/IM traffic).

Lincoln systems are generally implemented along with other Pen-Link products to enable features such as databases to store intercepted communications, mapping software (to monitor the locations of surveillance targets), visualization software, and link analysis features.

== See also ==
- Communications Assistance For Law Enforcement Act
- Verint Systems
- Mass surveillance
