= Lincoln Boulevard =

The following streets are called Lincoln Boulevard:

- Lincoln Boulevard (Oklahoma City), Oklahoma
- Lincoln Boulevard (Los Angeles County)
- Lincoln Boulevard (Omaha), Nebraska

== See also ==
- Lincoln Highway (disambiguation)
