= Lincoln Village =

Lincoln Village is the name of some places in the United States:

- Lincoln Village, California
- Lincoln Village, Ohio
- Lincoln Village, City of Milwaukee, Wisconsin A south side neighborhood of Milwaukee
