= Lincoln Bridge =

Lincoln Bridge may refer to:

- High Bridge, Lincoln, United Kingdom, also known as "Lincoln Bridge"

== United States ==
- Abraham Lincoln Memorial Bridge, between LaSalle and Oglesby, Illinois
- Lincoln Memorial Bridge, in Vincennes, Indiana
- Abraham Lincoln Bridge, carries I-65 across the Ohio River between Louisville, Kentucky and Jeffersonville, Indiana
- Lincoln Covered Bridge, a covered bridge in Woodstock, Vermont

== See also ==
- Juárez–Lincoln International Bridge, between Laredo, Texas, U.S. and Nuevo Laredo, Tamaulipas, Mexico
- Lincoln Highway Bridge (disambiguation)
- Lincoln Trail Bridge, between Cannelton, Indiana and Hawesville, Kentucky
- Linkin' Bridge, a singing group which performed in America's Got Talent (season 11)
