= Lincoln Creek (Colorado) =

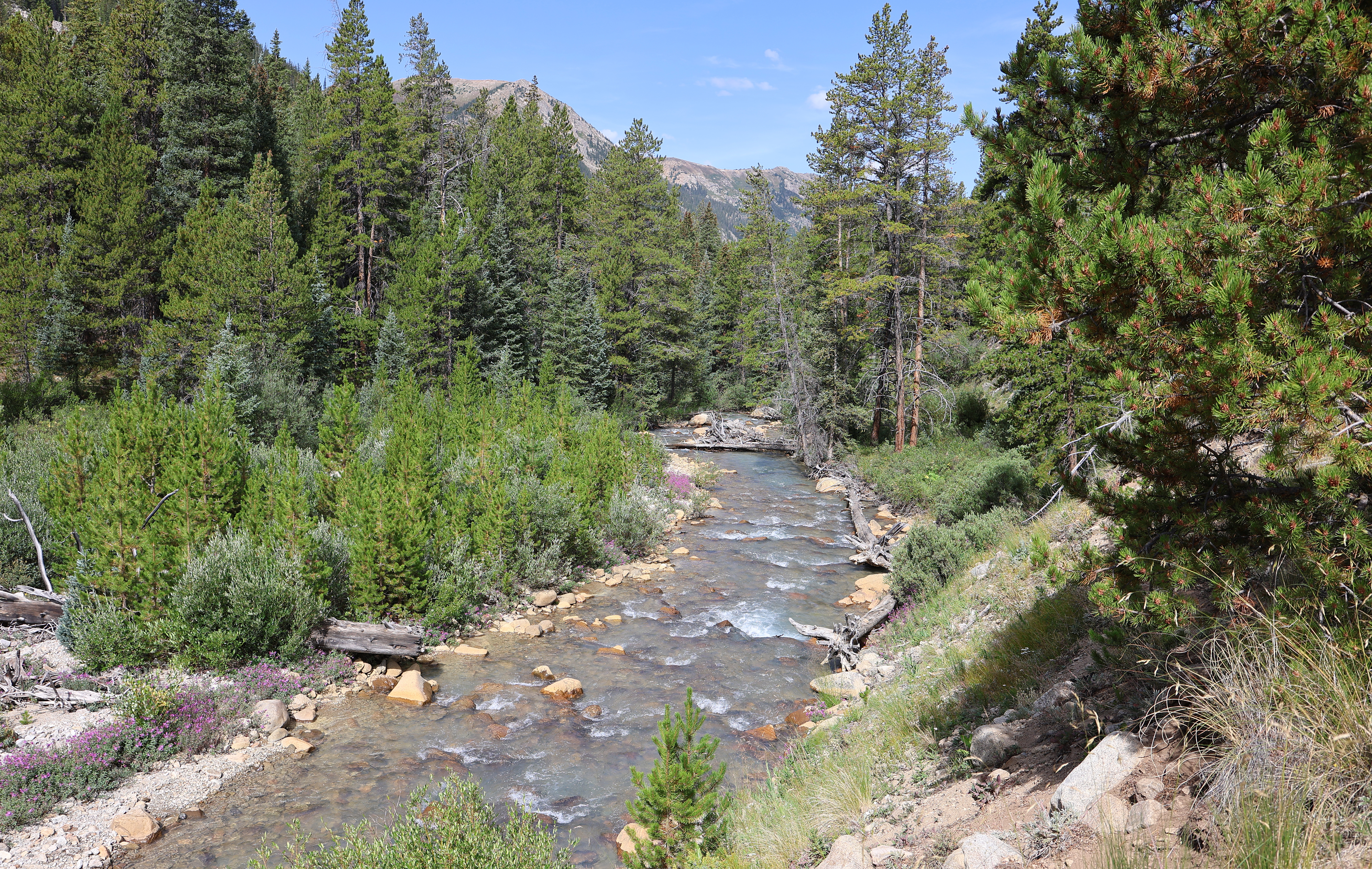
- The creek at the Tabor Creek Trail trailhead

- Location of the creek's mouth in Colorado, U.S.

Physical characteristics
- Source
  - location: Pitkin County, Colorado
  - coordinates: 39°0′38.97″N 106°37′5.12″W
- Mouth
  - location: Roaring Fork River
  - coordinates: 39°7′3.96″N 106°41′49.13″W
  - elevation: 9,584 feet (2,921 meters)

Basin features
- Progression: Roaring Fork → Colorado
- Tributaries
  - left: Galena Creek; Truro Creek; Tabor Creek; New York Creek
  - right: Grizzly Creek

Lincoln Creek is a tributary of the Roaring Fork River in Pitkin County, Colorado. The creek is part of the Independence Pass Transmountain Diversion System, and some of its flow is diverted across the continental divide to cities in the Front Range Urban Corridor.

== Course ==
The creek rises high in the White River National Forest in the Ruby Lakes area southwest of Grizzly Peak. From here, the creek flows generally north until it is impounded by Grizzly Reservoir.

Leaving Grizzly Reservoir, the creek flows along Lincoln Creek Road in a generally northwest direction until it reaches its confluence with the Roaring Fork River near Colorado State Highway 82 at the Lincoln Gulch Campground.

== Transbasin diversion ==
The creek is part of the Independence Pass Transmountain Diversion System. Grizzly Reservoir receives water from three canals that divert water from Lost Man Creek, the Roaring Fork River, and two of Lincoln Creek's tributaries, New York Creek and Tabor Creek. The system also diverts water from Lincoln Creek itself and sends all the collected water to the Front Range Urban Corridor via the Twin Lakes Tunnel, which runs from Grizzly Reservoir under the continental divide to North Fork Lake Creek in Lake County, Colorado.

== Lincoln Creek dispersed camping ==
Lincoln Creek Road, a rough and rocky dirt road, closely follows most of the creek's course. The Forest Service maintains 22 individual campsites along the road.

== See also ==
- List of rivers of Colorado
