= Lincoln, West Virginia =

- Unincorporated community
- Location within West Virginia and the United States Lincoln (the United States)
- Coordinates: 38°18′59″N 81°50′33″W
- Country: United States
- State: West Virginia
- County: Kanawha
- Elevation: 600 ft (180 m)
- Time zone: UTC-5 (Eastern (EST))
  - Summer (DST): UTC-4 (EDT)
- GNIS ID: 2726001

Lincoln was an unincorporated community in Kanawha County, West Virginia, United States.
