= Lincoln Six =

Australian automobile (1919–1926)

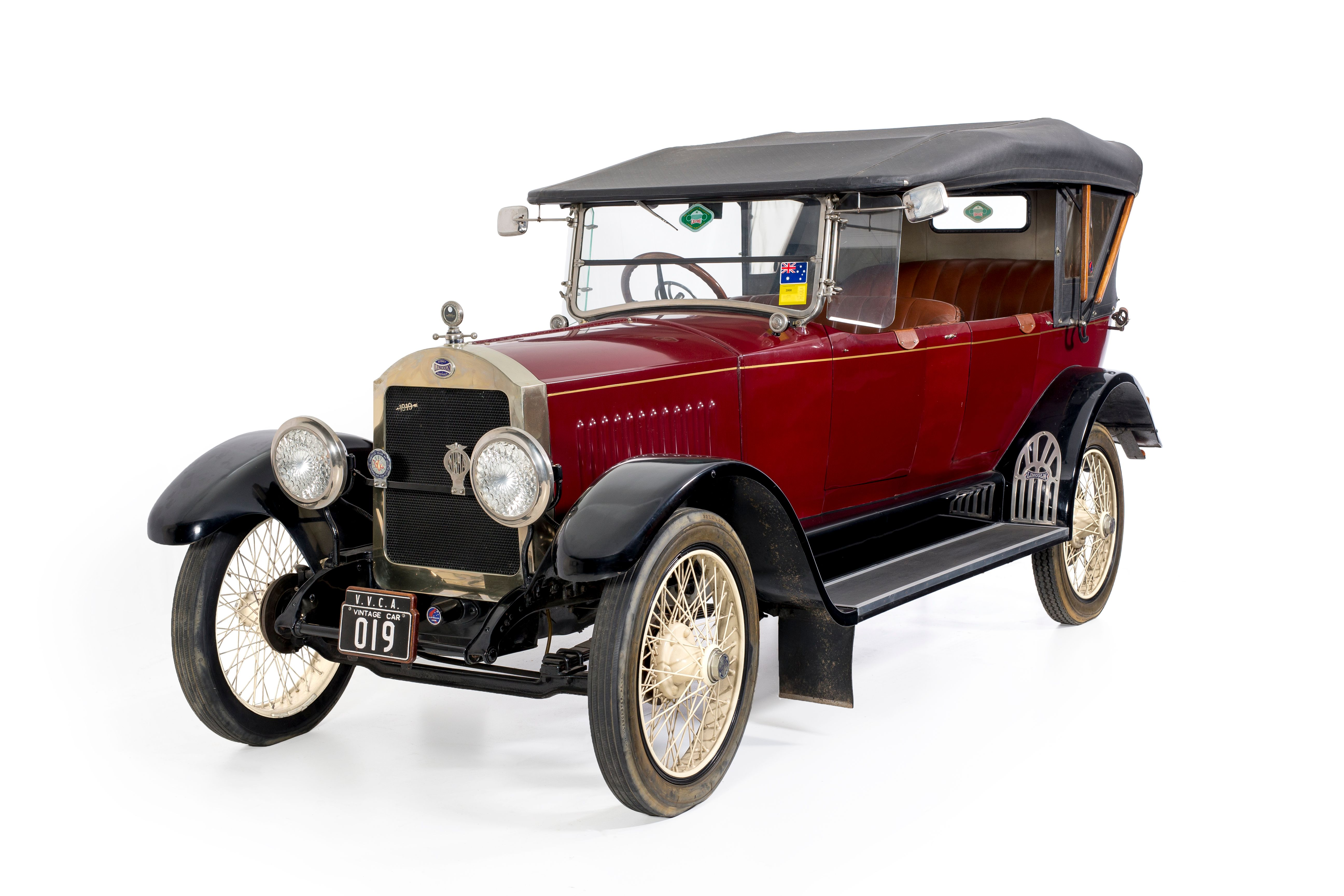
1919 Lincoln Tourer

The Lincoln Six is an Australian automobile manufactured from 1919 (Note: or 1918) to 1926 by Lincoln Motor Car Co in Sydney, Australia. It was built from a mixture of locally manufactured and imported parts from the United States, and was unveiled in Sydney in October 1918.

In the 1920s Lincoln Motor Car Co was involved a trademark dispute with the Lincoln Motor Company over Lincoln name in Australia.

== Background ==
In early 1918 Sydney-based motor engineer Charles Innes visited the United States, searching for parts to create a car. Finding companies in Detroit for the parts needed, and arranging shipment to assemble them in Sydney. Imported parts included: an American-built Continental Motors Company engine, axles from Timken, carburettor from Zenith, transmission, steel frame, and electrical equipment. A model was driven by Innes on a 3,338 mi (5,372 km) journey from Detroit to San Francisco before being shipped to Sydney.

The first automobile with the "Lincoln" name was produced in June 1918, and was exhibited in Sydney in October 1918.

Lincoln Motor Car Co was registered by Innes on 19 December 1918 on Help Street, Chatswood. The company moved to 20, 22 and 24 Chalmers Street, Sydney on 7 February 1919.

== Overview ==
The Lincoln Six first went on sale in 1918 or 1919. It was powered by a six cylinder Continental Red Seal Engine producing 25.3 hp (18.9 kW), paired with a transmission by Detroit Gear & Machine Company. It had a with a wheelbase of 120 in (3 m). A fire on Chalmers Street on the night of 18 June 1919 burnt down the building Lincoln Motor Car Co occupied.

At a motor show held on the Sydney Agricultural Grounds in January 1920 Lincoln showed tourer, roadster and chassis variants of the Six. At the April 1920 Sydney Royal Agricultural Show Lincoln claimed that 60 per cent of the car was manufactured in Australia.

In 1921 Acme springs suspension was introduced on the Six, and became a standard offering. It was the first car to be equipped with the springs, and was to be the only car fitted with them for a year. In 1923 an updated model introduced an altered radiator design, wholly made in Sydney.

In 1925 Lincoln became the sole distributor of Standard Motor cars in New South Wales, and released the Lincoln De Luxe 7-seater, with an engine producing 27.3 hp (20.4 kW), with a wheelbase of 124 in (3 m).

== Trademark dispute ==
The American Lincoln Motor Company applied to register a trademark on 8 August 1919, with the Australian Lincoln Motor Car Co applied for a trademark on 17 September 1919. The Acting Registrar of Trade Marks on 30 November 1920 held that the marks were "nearly identical" and refused to register both marks in Australia until the court determined the rights of the applicants.

The Deputy Registrar gave his decision on 4 August 1922 to grant the application of the Australian Lincoln, the decision was appealed by the American Lincoln to the Supreme Court of Victoria. On 10 May 1923 the American Lincoln's appeal was dismissed by the Chief Justice of Victoria, Sir William Irvine. It was decided in favour of the Australian Lincoln, provided that they renounced exclusive rights to the Lincoln name in Australia. After the decision Robert Menzies applied special leave to the High Court of Australia against the provision made by the Irvine. The appeal was dismissed with costs.
