= Lincoln Heights =

Lincoln Heights may refer to:

== Places ==
In Canada:

- Lincoln Heights (Ottawa), Ontario, a neighbourhood

In the United States:

- Lincoln Heights, Los Angeles, California
- Lincoln Heights (San Francisco), California, a hill
- Lincoln Heights, Ohio, a village in Hamilton County
- Lincoln Heights, Richland County, Ohio, a census-designated place
- Lincoln Heights, Washington, D.C., a neighborhood

== Other ==
- Lincoln Heights (TV series), the ABC Family original series
