= Camp Lincoln Commissary Building =

- U.S. National Register of Historic Places
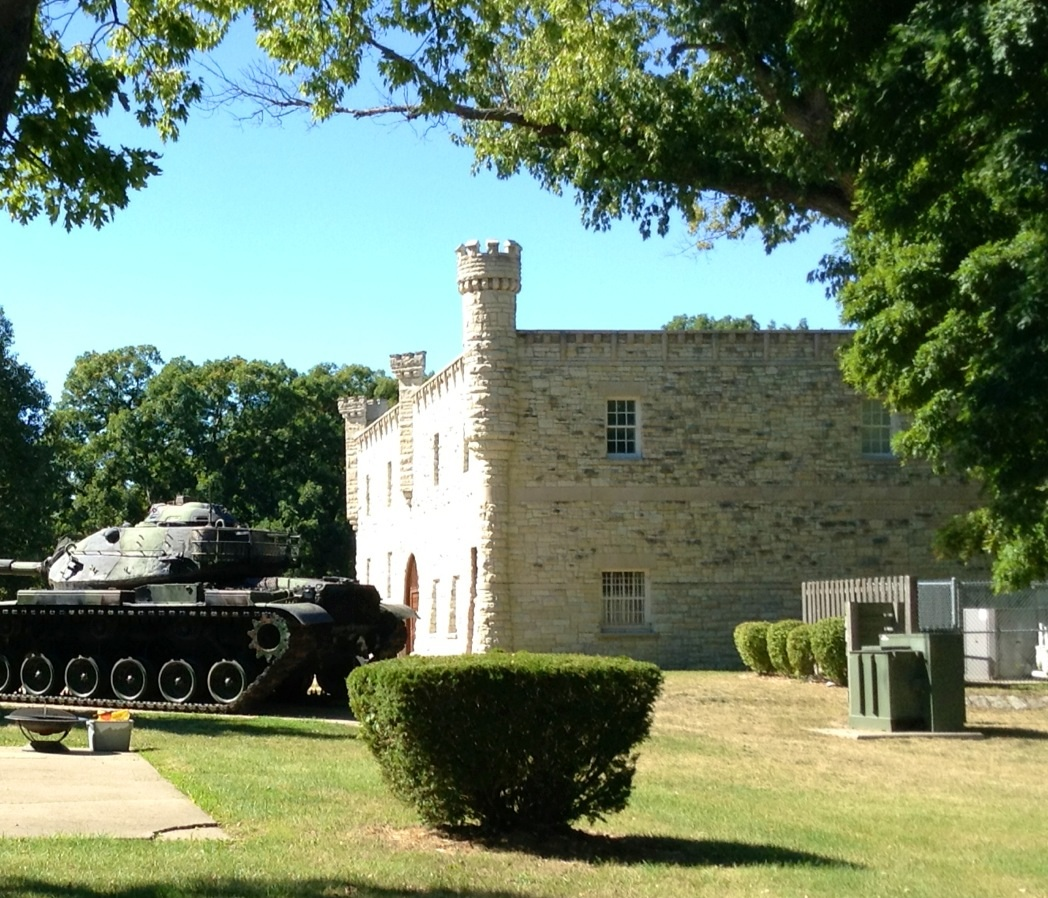

- Location within Illinois Location within the United States
- Location: 1301 N. MacArthur Blvd., Springfield, Illinois
- Coordinates: 39°49′15″N 89°40′8″W
- Area: less than one acre
- Built: 1903
- Built by: Culver Stone Co.
- Architect: Hanes, J. S.
- Architectural style: Castellated fortress
- NRHP reference No.: 84000333
- Added to NRHP: November 13, 1984

The Camp Lincoln Commissary Building is a historic building on the grounds of Camp Lincoln, a National Guard camp in Springfield, Illinois. Built in 1903, the commissary is the oldest building remaining at Camp Lincoln. The camp, which opened in 1886, had previously used tents or temporary buildings for most of its activities, and the commissary soon became the camp's center of activity; it has served as a headquarters, barracks, hospital, and physical examination center at various points. The Culver Stone Company, which constructed several of Springfield's public buildings, built the commissary. The rusticated limestone building is designed to resemble a castle, as it features turrets and battlements along its roof. The building now houses a military museum.

The building was added to the National Register of Historic Places on November 13, 1984.
