= Lincoln Park Zoo (Manitowoc) =

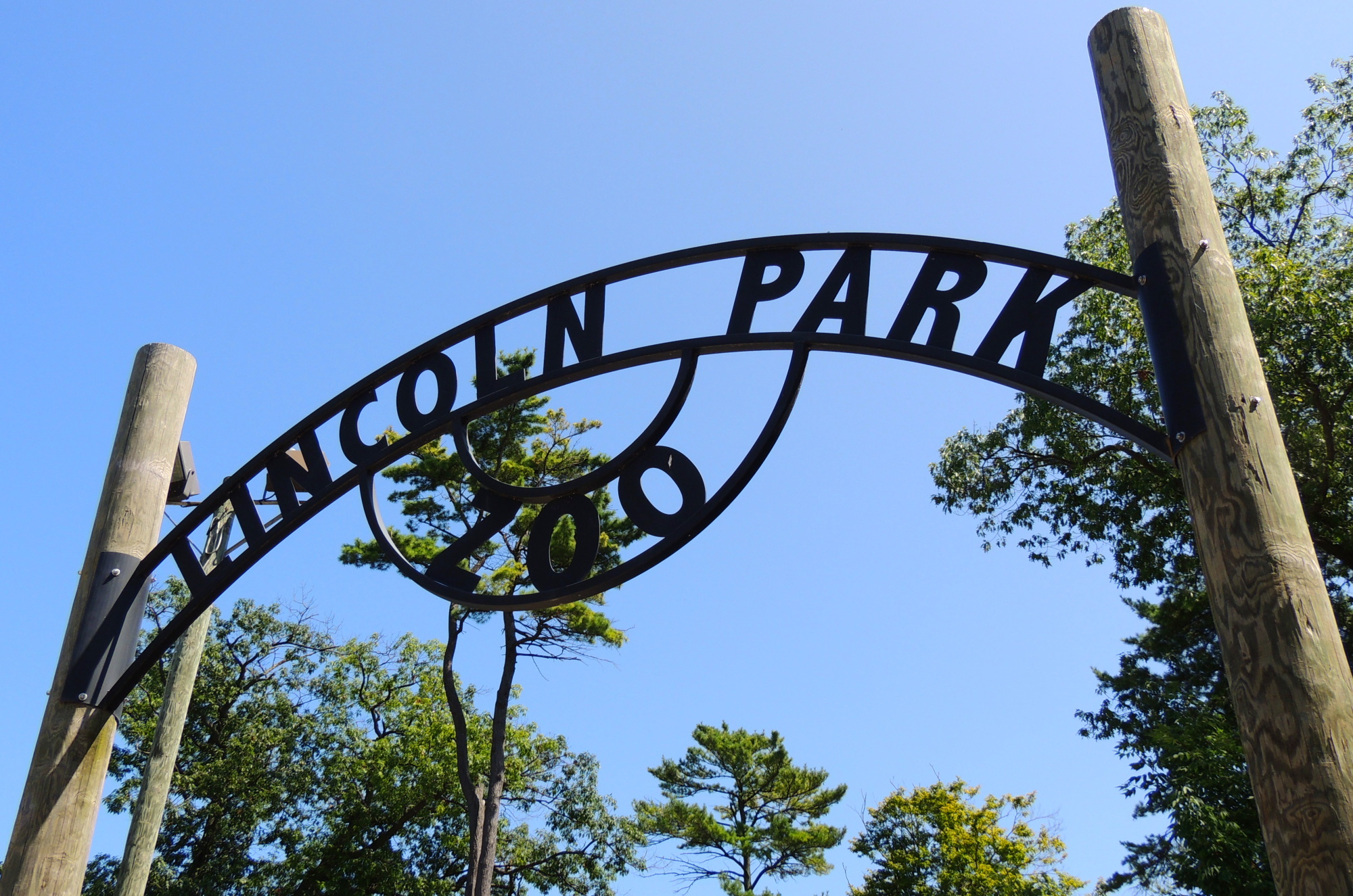
- Interactive map of Lincoln Park Zoo
- Location: 1215 North 8th Street; Manitowoc, Wisconsin, United States
- Land area: 20 acres
- No. of animals: <200
- Owner: City of Manitowoc
- Website: Lincoln Park Zoo

Lincoln Park Zoo is a small municipal zoo located in Manitowoc, Wisconsin. The zoo has just under 200 animals, including black bear, bald eagle, cougar, lynx and others. It is situated along the Little Manitowoc River and provides a deck for viewing ducks, geese, and many other birds that gather along the river.

== Exhibits ==
=== Big Red Barn ===
The Lincoln Park Zoo's Big Red Barn was built in 2000 with the support of the Manitowoc County Farm Bureau and Manitowoc County Dairy Promotions. The barn is located on the north end of the zoo. The Big Red Barn is home to a variety of young farm animals, on loan from local farmers. Chickens, goats, cows, lop-eared rabbits, pigs and turkeys are housed at the barn.

=== Education Center ===
The Zoo's Education Center is located on the second floor of the Education and Animal Care Building and is home to Wisconsin native reptiles, insects, amphibians, fish and birds. The Education Center features animals such as the African spurred tortoise, ball pythons, box turtles, Chilean rose tarantula, honeybees, and cedar waxwing.

== Animals ==
- Asiatic black bear
- Bald eagle
- Bison
- Cougar
- Dall sheep
- Rouen, Muscovy, Pekin, and Cayuga ducks
- Great horned owl
- Embden and Toulouse geese
- Grey wolf
- Lynx
- Pigeons
- Prairie dogs
- Red-tailed hawk
- Tundra swan
- Turkey vulture
- White-tailed deer

== Incidents ==
- In 1994 a timber wolf attacked a child and ripped off his right arm, prompting other Wisconsin zoos to review their own safety.
- In 2007, two cougars were released from their cages at the zoo by unknown vandals.
- In 2010, a woman had two fingers bitten off after she ignored barriers to try to feed an Asiatic black bear.
