= Lincoln Center (disambiguation) =

Lincoln Center usually refers to Lincoln Center for the Performing Arts in New York City, U.S.

Lincoln Center may also refer to:

== Places ==
- Lincoln Center, Kansas, a small city, U.S.

== Structures ==
- Lincoln Center (Denver), a skyscraper, U.S.
- Lincoln Center (Oregon), office complex in Tigard, Oregon, U.S.
- 701 Brickell Avenue, Miami, U.S. an office skyscraper known as The Lincoln Center until 2004
- Fort Collins Lincoln Center, performing arts center in Colorado, U.S.

== Other uses ==
- 66th Street–Lincoln Center (IRT Broadway–Seventh Avenue Line), subway station at Lincoln Center in New York, U.S.
- Lincoln Center Historic District, Lincoln, Massachusetts, U.S.
- Lincoln Center Institute, also known as Lincoln Center Education, the education division of Lincoln Center for the Performing Arts. New York, U.S.
- The Lincoln Center for Family and Youth, also known as The Lincoln Center, a non-profit education and social services organization in Philadelphia, U.S.
