= Lincoln Junior High School =

Lincoln Junior High School may refer to:

- Lincoln Junior High School, Taft, California, Taft City School District
- Lincoln Junior High School, Skokie, Illinois (Chicago area), Skokie/Morton Grove School District 69
- Abraham Lincoln Junior High School (now Gregory-Lincoln Education Center), Houston, Texas, Houston Independent School District
- Lincoln Junior High School, Bentonville, Arkansas, Bentonville School District

== See also ==
- Lincoln Junior - Senior High School (disambiguation)
- Lincoln Middle School (disambiguation)
