= Lincoln Park (Youngstown, Ohio) =

City park in Youngstown, Ohio

Lincoln Park is a city park in Youngstown, Ohio in the city's east side. The park is bordered by Oak Street and Lincoln Park Drive. A stream once called Dry Run runs through the park and is a tributary to the Mahoning River.

Council Rock is located in Youngstown's Lincoln Park. According to legend, Native Americans from several tribes met at Council Rock in 1755, to celebrate a recent victory over the British in a French and Indian War battle. During the celebration, lightning struck the rock and caused it to split. The lightning and storm also caused the deaths of four chiefs and three hundred tribesmen. Because of this event, Native Americans abandoned the site for many years.
