= Lincoln Square =

Lincoln Square may refer to:

- Lincoln Square, Manhattan
  - Lincoln Square Productions
  - Lincoln Square Synagogue
- Lincoln Square (Bellevue), Washington
- Lincoln Square, in Carlton, Victoria, Australia
- Lincoln Square, Chicago
- Lincoln Square, Manchester
- Lincoln Square, Philadelphia
- Lincoln Square Mall Urbana, Illinois
