= Ambrose Lincoln Jr. House =

Historic house in Massachusetts, United States

- U.S. National Register of Historic Places
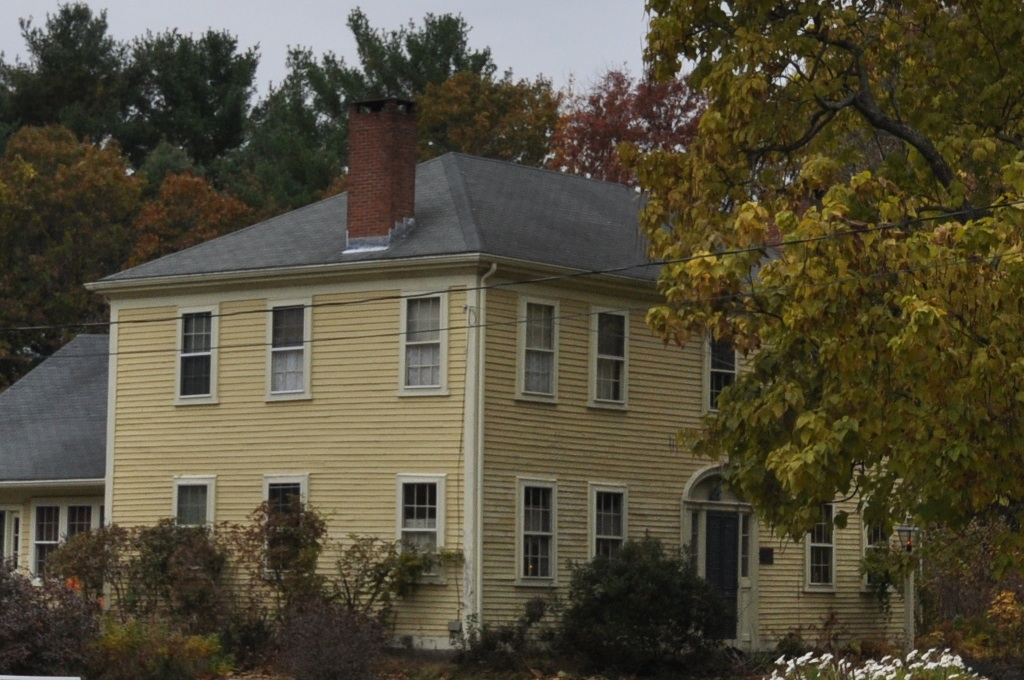

- Location within Massachusetts Location within the United States
- Location: 1916 Bay St., Taunton, Massachusetts
- Coordinates: 41°54′50″N 71°5′37″W
- Built: c. 1775
- Architectural style: Federal
- MPS: Taunton MRA
- NRHP reference No.: 84002157
- Added to NRHP: July 5, 1984

The Ambrose Lincoln Jr. House is a historic house located at 1916 Bay Street in Taunton, Massachusetts.

== Description and history ==
It was built in about 1775 by Ambrose Lincoln Jr., a farmer, shortly after his marriage. The house remained in the Lincoln family until it was sold to William Austin in 1919.

The Federal Period, two-story I-house has a hipped roof with a five-bay wide façade is entered through a central doorway with a louvered fanlight set in a key-stoned, molded surround. The structure features two interior end chimneys.

It was added to the National Register of Historic Places on July 5, 1984.

== See also ==
- National Register of Historic Places listings in Taunton, Massachusetts
- North Taunton Baptist Church
