= Lincoln Memorial (disambiguation) =

The Lincoln Memorial is a U.S. national memorial honoring Abraham Lincoln, located in Washington, D.C. Other memorials and monuments to Abraham Lincoln include:

- Abraham Lincoln Memorial Monument, in Laramie, Wyoming
- Lincoln Memorial Park, in Miami, Florida
- Lincoln Memorial Cemetery (Suitland, Maryland)
- Lincoln Memorial University, in Harrogate, Tennessee
- Lincoln Monument (Dixon, Illinois)
- Lincoln Monument of Wabash, Indiana
