= HMT Lincoln City =

HMT Lincoln City was an anti-submarine warfare (ASW) trawler in the service of the British Royal Navy during World War II. She was bombed during an air raid and sank on 21 February 1941 at the Faroe Islands.

== Construction and Ownership ==
Smiths Dock Company built the ship as the fishing vessel Pembroke Castle in 1933. The ship was of 398 tons and was equipped with a 1x3 cylinder triple expansion engine. The ship began her life with the Consolidated Steam Fishing & Ice Compmnay, Ltd., and served as a fishing boat for the company from 1933 until 1939. In April 1938, her name was changed to Lincoln City.

== Requisition by the Admiralty ==
During World War II, the Royal Navy requisitioned hundreds of civilian ships for war service in various roles, with many ending up as minesweepers or anti-submarine warfare trawlers. The Royal Navy requisitioned Lincoln City in 1939, equipping her with a single 4-inch (102-mm) gun. Commissioned as HMT Lincoln City, she was put under the command of Skr. Frederick William White Burnett of the Royal Navy Reserve. He served aboard Lincoln City from 1 December 1939 until 18 March 1940, at which point T/S. Lt. Francis Albert Seward took over until Lincoln City was sunk.

== Loss ==
In 1941, Lincoln City was stationed in Tórshavn, located in the Faroe Islands, a constituency of Denmark. The British occupation of the Faroe Islands had been ongoing since April 1940 in order to prevent a German invasion of the strategically important location. During a German air raid on 21 February 1941, Lincoln City shot down a German bomber but was sunk, killing eight crewmen on board.
