= Lincoln, Trempealeau County, Wisconsin =

Lincoln, Wisconsin
- Town
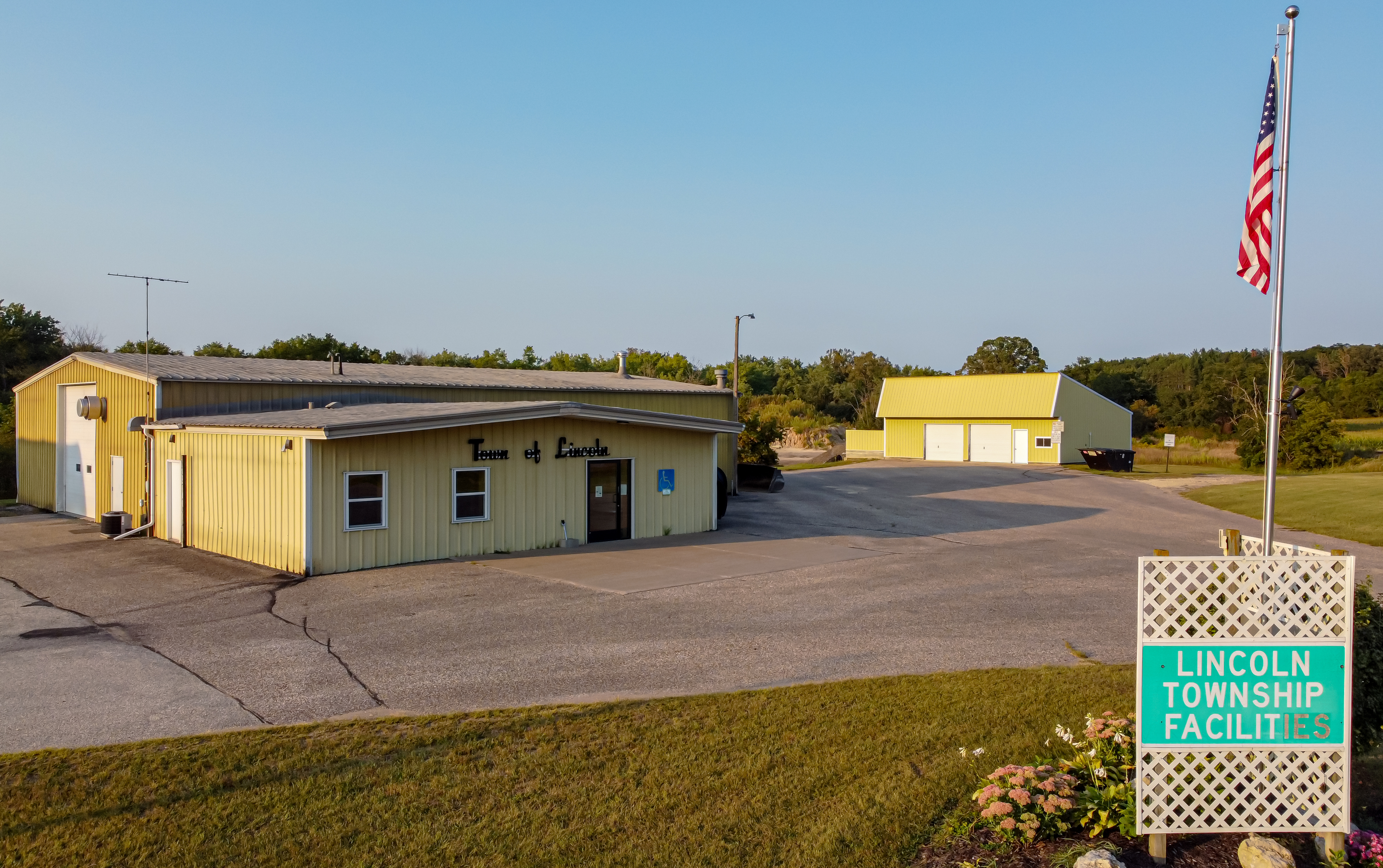
- Town hall

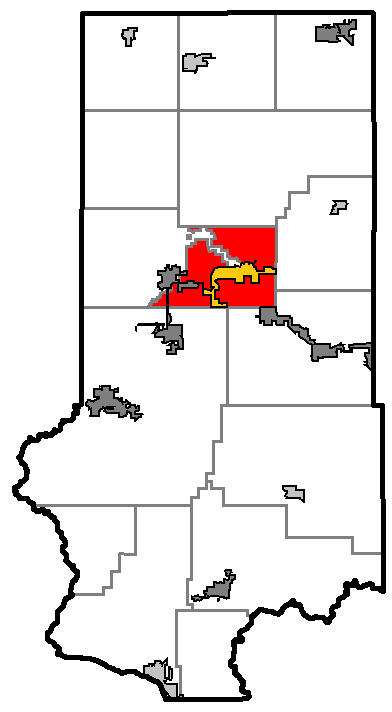
- Location of Lincoln, Trempealeau County, Wisconsin

- Location of Trempealeau County, Wisconsin
- Coordinates: 44°21′38″N 91°21′17″W
- Country: United States
- State: Wisconsin
- County: Trempealeau

Area
  - Total: 28.4 sq mi (73.5 km^{2})
  - Land: 28.3 sq mi (73.4 km^{2})
  - Water: 0.039 sq mi (0.1 km^{2})
- Elevation: 866 ft (264 m)

Population (2020)
  - Total: 779
  - Density: 27.5/sq mi (10.6/km^{2})
- Time zone: UTC-6 (Central (CST))
  - Summer (DST): UTC-5 (CDT)
- FIPS code: 55-44500
- GNIS feature ID: 1583569
- Website: https://lincolntownship.org/

Lincoln is a town in Trempealeau County, Wisconsin, United States. The population was 779 at the 2020 census.

== Geography ==
According to the United States Census Bureau, the town has a total area of 28.4 square miles (73.5 km^{2}), of which 28.3 square miles (73.4 km^{2}) is land and 0.04 square mile (0.1 km^{2}) (0.14%) is water.

== Demographics ==
As of the census of 2000, there were 829 people, 257 households, and 190 families residing in the town. The population density was 29.3 people per square mile (11.3/km^{2}). There were 271 housing units at an average density of 9.6 per square mile (3.7/km^{2}). The racial makeup of the town was 99.03% White, 0.24% African American, 0.12% Native American, 0.24% Asian, 0.24% from other races, and 0.12% from two or more races. Hispanic or Latino of any race were 1.09% of the population.

There were 257 households, out of which 36.6% had children under the age of 18 living with them, 59.5% were married couples living together, 6.6% had a female householder with no husband present, and 25.7% were non-families. 19.5% of all households were made up of individuals, and 7.8% had someone living alone who was 65 years of age or older. The average household size was 2.70 and the average family size was 3.14.

In the town, the population was 24.5% under the age of 18, 6.0% from 18 to 24, 33.9% from 25 to 44, 27.1% from 45 to 64, and 8.4% who were 65 years of age or older. The median age was 38 years. For every 100 females, there were 128.4 males. For every 100 females age 18 and over, there were 131.0 males.

The median income for a household in the town was $33,393, and the median income for a family was $37,292. Males had a median income of $27,115 versus $20,417 for females. The per capita income for the town was $13,393. About 13.0% of families and 30.9% of the population were below the poverty line, including 26.8% of those under age 18 and 17.4% of those age 65 or over.
