= Lincoln Cemetery (Montgomery, Alabama) =

Historic cemetery in Alabama, US

- Interactive map of Lincoln Cemetery

Details
- Established: 1907; 119 years ago
- Country: United States
- Coordinates: 32.36750°N 86.26420°W
- Find a Grave: Lincoln Cemetery

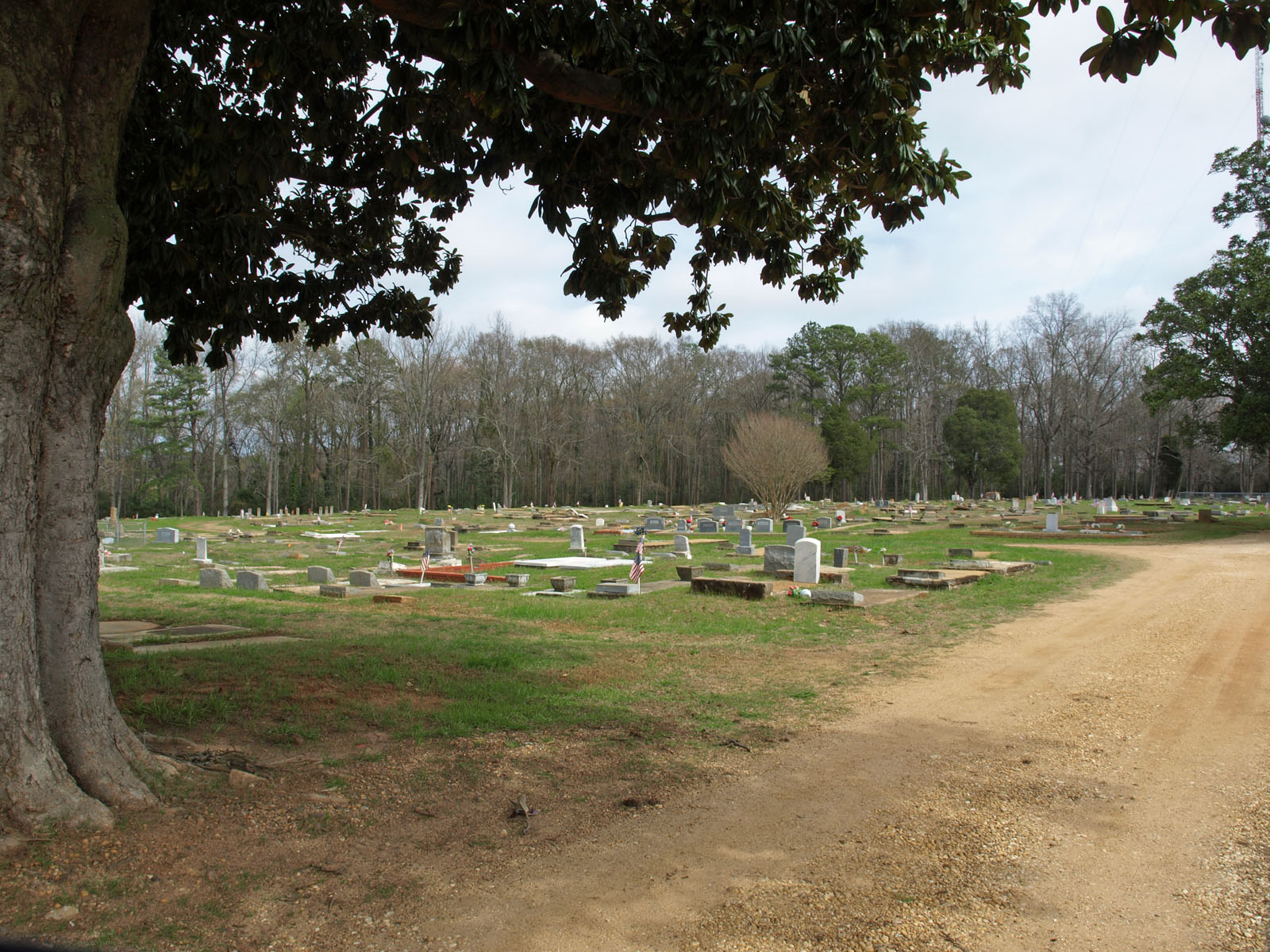
Lincoln Cemetery in Montgomery, Alabama (2012)

Lincoln Cemetery is a historic cemetery in Montgomery, Alabama, opened in 1908 for the city's Black population.

== Early history ==
The historic marker notes that it was begun by the American Securities Company; Lincoln was for Black people, and Greenwood Cemetery, next to it, was for whites. Started in 1907, they were the first commercial cemeteries in the city, and their design, with curving roads and circles, was influenced by Frederick Law Olmsted. The first burial took place in 1908. Many of the graves are marked by "simple concrete slabs with evidences of African-American funerary art and late-Victorian motifs". Some of markers are made from marble, indicating members of the Mosaic Templars of America and of veterans. The cemetery was owned by American Securities until 1957, when its tax-exemption ended.

A nine-foot tall white marble monument remembers Rufus Payne, Hank Williams's mentor, though the exact location of his grave is not known.

== Recent history ==
By 2010, the cemetery was in serious disrepair, suffering from neglect and vandalism. The city had set up the Lincoln Cemetery Rehabilitation Authority and volunteers had started cleaning up and recording names. The cemetery was originally planned for 700 graves, but by 2012 those volunteers had registered over 6,700 graves. Some of them were under the roads around the cemetery. An additional problem is that many of the grave markers are not actually in the right spot, and that in some places markers have been stacked; "When somebody would be buried here, they were burying people on top of people," according to one volunteer. Since the cemetery (along with a few others in the city) is not compliant with local ordinances, no new burials are allowed.

By 2021, the Lincoln Cemetery Rehabilitation Authority was still working at the cemetery, with local historian Richard Bailey joining them to prepare for two historical markers.

== Notable burials ==
- Rufus Payne
