= HMS Lincoln =

Three ships of the Royal Navy have been named HMS Lincoln after the city of Lincoln:

- HMS Lincoln (1695) was a 50-gun fourth rate launched in 1695. She foundered in 1703.
- HMS Lincoln (G42) was a Town-class destroyer originally in service with the US Navy as USS Yarnall. She was transferred to the Royal Navy in 1940, lent to the Norwegian Navy in 1941, then the Soviet Navy in 1944 as Druzhny. She served with them until 1952, when she was sold for scrapping.
- HMS Lincoln (F99) was a Salisbury-class frigate launched in 1960 and broken up in 1983.
