= Lincoln Museum =

Lincoln Museum can refer to:

- Abraham Lincoln Birthplace National Historical Park
- Abraham Lincoln Presidential Library and Museum, Springfield, Illinois, USA
- Abraham Lincoln Library and Museum at Lincoln Memorial University, Harrogate, Tennessee, USA
- Lincoln Museum, Lincolnshire, England, UK
- The Lincoln Museum (Fort Wayne, Indiana) — a repository for Lincoln Financial Foundation's Abraham Lincoln memorabilia; closed to the public in 2008
- Ford's Theatre, Washington, DC, USA — where Abraham Lincoln was assassinated; known as Lincoln Museum from 1936 to 1965 and legally "Ford's Theater (Lincoln Museum)" since 1965
- The Lincoln Museum (Hodgenville, Kentucky)

== See also ==
- Category:Museums in Lincoln, Nebraska
- Category:Museums in Lincolnshire
