= Lincoln Speedway =

Lincoln Speedway may refer to:

- Lincoln Speedway (Illinois) - 1/4 mile dirt oval race track in Lincoln, Illinois
- Lincoln Speedway (Pennsylvania) - 3/8 mile high banked dirt oval race track in Abbottstown, Pennsylvania
