= Lincoln Highway Bridge =

Lincoln Highway Bridge may refer to:

- Lincoln Highway Bridge (Dugway Proving Ground, Utah), a historic bridge on the proposed route for the Lincoln Highway in the United States, that is listed on the National Register of Historic Places (NRHP)
- Lincoln Highway Bridge (Tama, Iowa), a historic bridge the United States, that is listed on the NRHP
- Lincoln Highway Hackensack River Bridge, a bridge in Hudson County, New Jersey, United States
- Lincoln Highway Passaic River Bridge, a bridge in Hudson County, New Jersey, United States

== See also ==
- Lincoln Bridge (disambiguation)
