= HMS Lincoln (1695) =

Ship of the line of the Royal Navy

History

England
- Name: HMS Lincoln
- Ordered: 16 November 1693
- Builder: Joseph Lawrence, Woolwich Dockyard
- Launched: 19 September 1695
- Fate: Disappeared, presumed foundered in a storm, 29 January 1703

General characteristics
- Class & type: 50-gun fourth rate ship of the line
- Tons burthen: 675 91/94 bm
- Length: 130 ft 7 in (39.8 m) (gundeck) 108 ft 4 in (33.0 m) (keel)
- Beam: 34 ft 3.5 in (10.5 m)
- Depth of hold: 13 ft 6.5 in (4.1 m)
- Propulsion: Sails
- Sail plan: Full-rigged ship
- Armament: 50 guns: Lower gundeck 20 x 12 pdr guns; Upper gundeck 22 x demi-culverins (9 pdr guns); Quarterdeck 2 x minions (4 pdr guns)

HMS Lincoln was a 50-gun fourth rate ship of the line of the English Royal Navy, one of five such ships authorised on 16 November 1693 (three to be built in different Royal Dockyards and two to be built by commercial contract. The Lincoln was built by Master Shipwright Joseph Lawewence at Woolwich Dockyard and was launched on 19 September 1695.

Lincoln disappeared in the North Sea on 29 January 1703, after sailing from Great Yarmouth under the command of Captain Henry Middleton, and was presumed to have foundered with all hands in a storm.
