= Lincoln, Buffalo County, Wisconsin =

Lincoln, Wisconsin
- Town
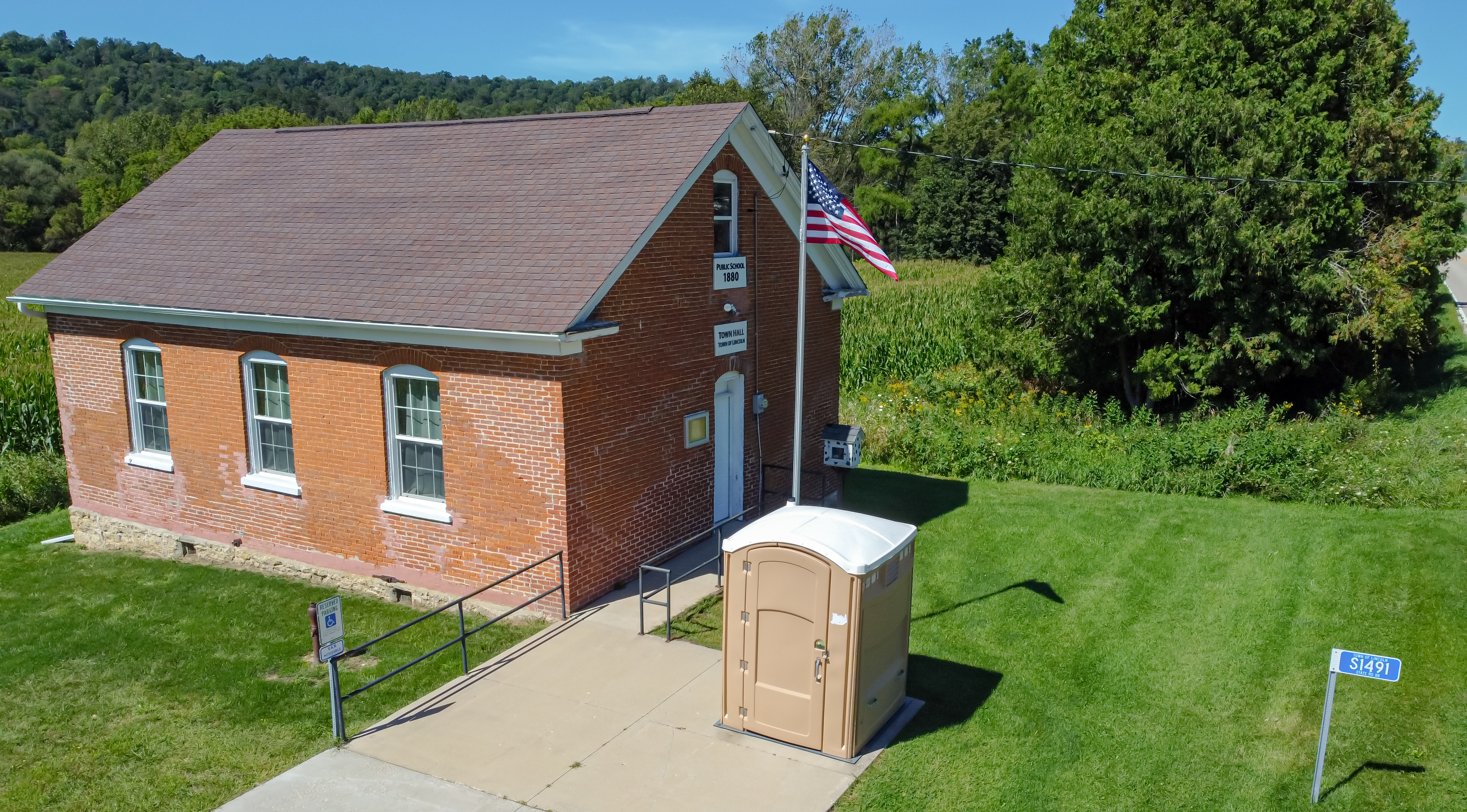
- Town hall

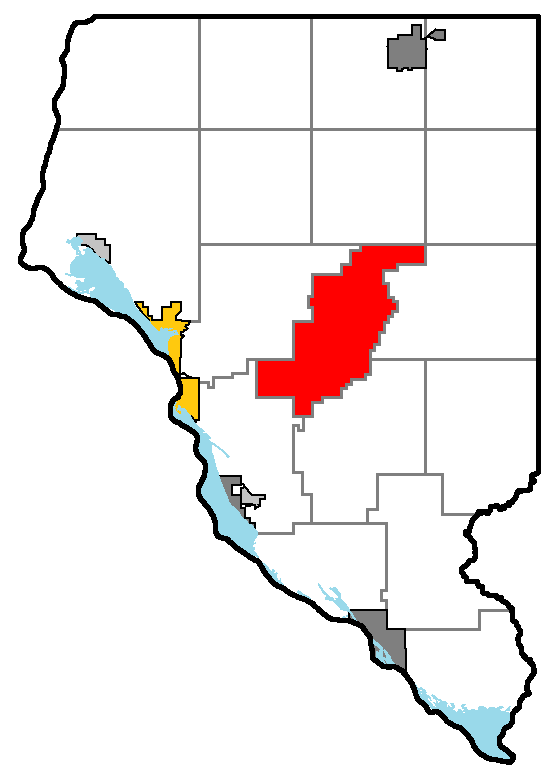
- Location of Lincoln, Buffalo County

- Location of Buffalo County, Wisconsin
- Coordinates: 44°20′37″N 91°44′35″W
- Country: United States
- State: Wisconsin
- County: Buffalo

Area
  - Total: 36.94 sq mi (95.68 km^{2})
  - Land: 36.92 sq mi (95.62 km^{2})
  - Water: 0.023 sq mi (0.06 km^{2})
- Elevation: 817 ft (249 m)

Population (2020)
  - Total: 167
  - Density: 4.52/sq mi (1.75/km^{2})
- Time zone: UTC-6 (Central (CST))
  - Summer (DST): UTC-5 (CDT)
- FIPS code: 55-44300
- GNIS feature ID: 1583562
- Website: https://www.bc-lincoln.com/

Lincoln is a town in Buffalo County in the U.S. state of Wisconsin. The population was 167 at the 2020 census. The unincorporated communities of Cream and Praag (/prɑːɡ/ PRAHG) are located in the town.

== Geography ==
According to the United States Census Bureau, the town has a total area of 36.9 square miles (95.7 km^{2}), of which 0.023 square miles (0.06 km^{2}), or 0.06%, is water.

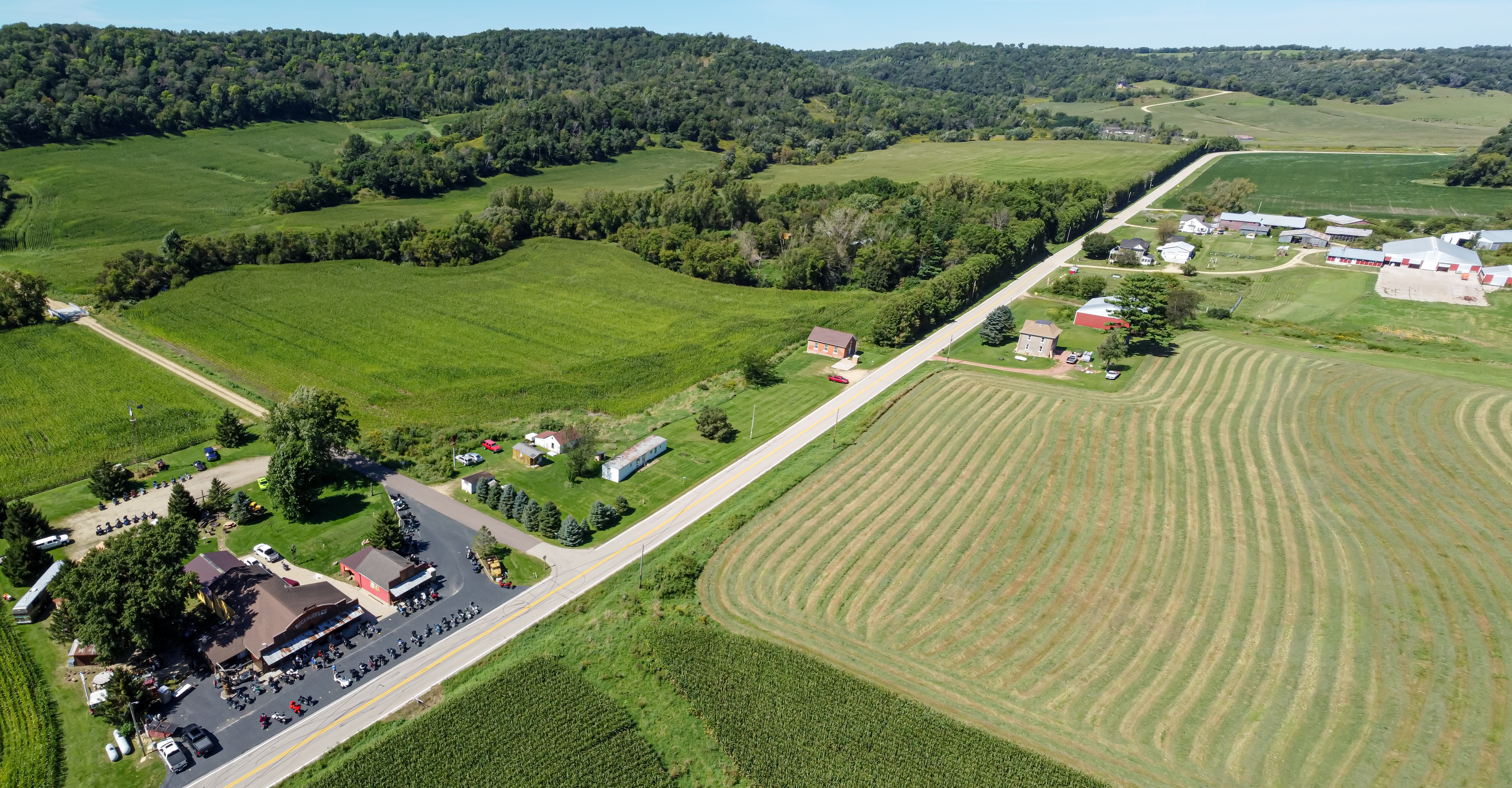
Praag

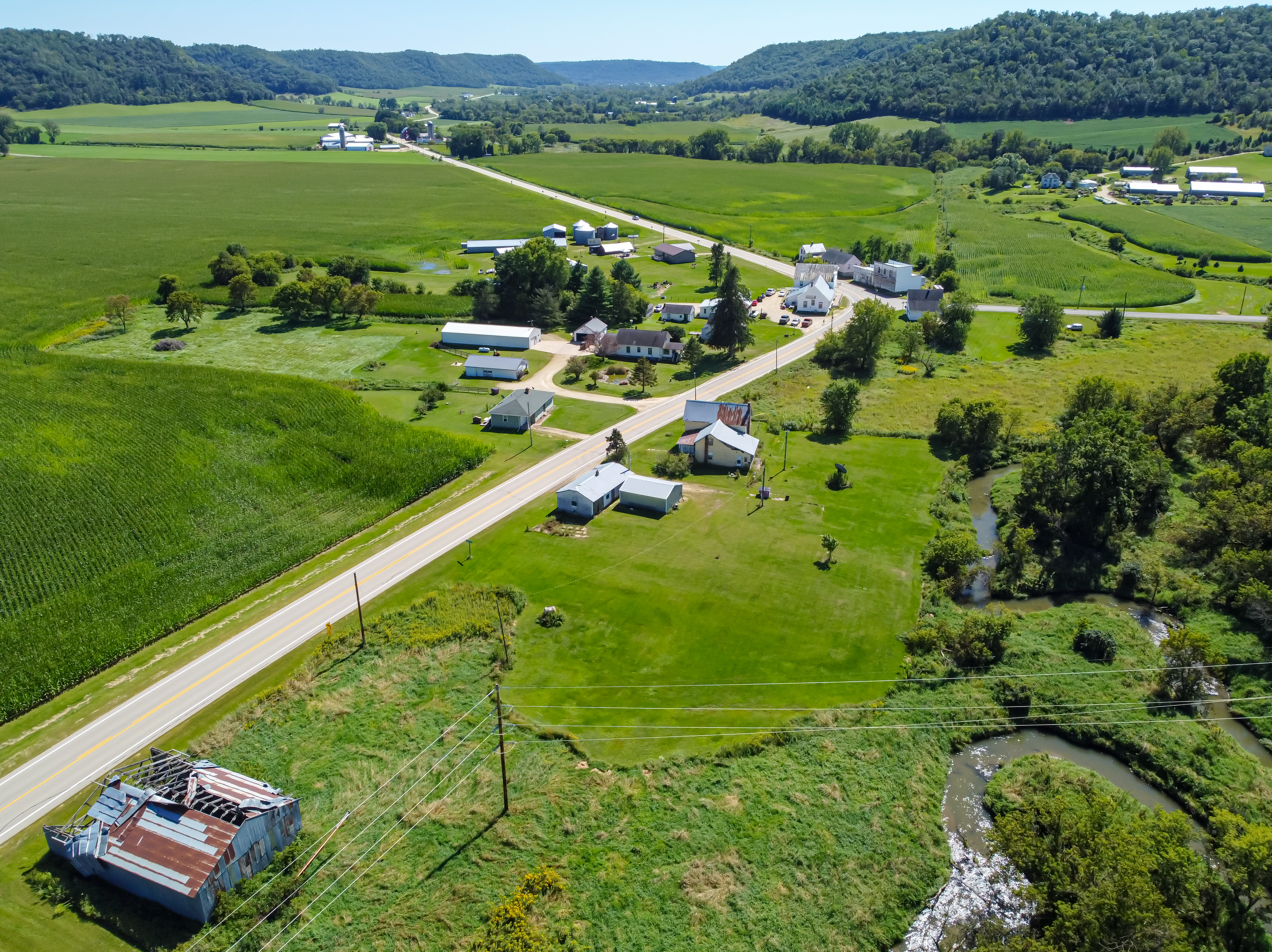
Cream

== Demographics ==
As of the census of 2000, there were 187 people, 79 households, and 56 families residing in the town. The population density was 5.1 people per square mile (2.0/km^{2}). There were 106 housing units at an average density of 2.9 per square mile (1.1/km^{2}). The racial makeup of the town was 99.47% White and 0.53% Native American.

There were 79 households, out of which 24.1% had children under the age of 18 living with them, 62.0% were married couples living together, 2.5% had a female householder with no husband present, and 29.1% were non-families. 24.1% of all households were made up of individuals, and 8.9% had someone living alone who was 65 years of age or older. The average household size was 2.37 and the average family size was 2.79.

In the town, the population was spread out, with 18.7% under the age of 18, 7.0% from 18 to 24, 25.7% from 25 to 44, 28.9% from 45 to 64, and 19.8% who were 65 years of age or older. The median age was 44 years. For every 100 females, there were 107.8 males. For every 100 females age 18 and over, there were 111.1 males.

The median income for a household in the town was $36,667, and the median income for a family was $46,875. Males had a median income of $21,875 versus $16,750 for females. The per capita income for the town was $17,768. About 5.7% of families and 6.5% of the population were below the poverty line, including 12.5% of those under the age of eighteen and none of those 65 or over.
