= Lincoln Highway (Delaware) =

Résumé of the development of the route of the Lincoln Highway

The Lincoln Highway in Delaware was a designation that existed from the 1910s to 1938, running from the Maryland border west of Newark to the Pennsylvania border in Claymont by way of Newark and Wilmington. The roadway is now part of the following roads:

- Delaware Route 279 between the Maryland border and Newark
- Delaware Route 896 and Delaware Route 273 in Newark
- Delaware Route 2 between Newark and Wilmington (the eastern portion has been bypassed and is now Old Capitol Trail)
- U.S. Route 13 Business and U.S. Route 13 along Philadelphia Pike between Wilmington and the Pennsylvania border in Claymont
