= The Lincoln Center for Family and Youth =

Coordinates: 40.127496°N 75.415805°W

- Founded: April 2, 1970
- Founder: Eagleville Hospital, Eagleville, Pennsylvania
- Location: Audubon, Pennsylvania
- Region served: Philadelphia metropolitan area
- Services: education, coaching, counseling, consulting
- Revenue: $21.6 million
- Endowment: $22.0 million
- Employees: 227
- Volunteers: 10
- Website: thelincolncenter.com

The Lincoln Center for Family and Youth (TLC), headquartered in Audubon, Pennsylvania, is a social enterprise.

== History ==
TLC was established in 1970 as a training division of the Eagleville Hospital in Eagleville, Pennsylvania. In 1973, Eagleville started a School-Based Services division by placing its first in-school counselor at Keith Valley Middle School in Horsham, Pennsylvania. In 1975, Eagleville started Montgomery County Day School, an alternative school for non-traditional leaners. The school was later renamed to Lincoln Academy and is now TLC Leadership Academy. In 1978, through a federal grant from the National Center on Child Abuse and Neglect, Eagleville launched its Community-Based Services program to provide mobile mental health counseling. In 1983, the Department of Family and Youth separated from Eagleville Hospital and incorporated as The Lincoln Center for Family and Youth, a new 501(c)(3) organization.

== Services ==
Today, TLC provides school-based mental and behavioral health counseling, in-home counseling for victims of crime, community-based art therapy, health and wellness coaching, alternative youth education, trauma-informed professional development, community-violence intervention, and federal and state grant writing services for school districts, universities, hospitals, police departments, and other nonprofit and government agencies.
