= USS Abraham Lincoln =

Three US Navy ships have borne the name Abraham Lincoln, in honor of the 16th president of the United States.

- USS President Lincoln, a troop transport that was commissioned in 1917 and sank in 1918
- USS Abraham Lincoln (SSBN-602), a ballistic missile submarine in service from 1961 to 1981
- USS Abraham Lincoln (CVN-72), an aircraft carrier commissioned in 1989 and currently in service

== See also ==
- Abraham Lincoln, a fictional U.S. Navy frigate in the novel Twenty Thousand Leagues Under the Seas
