= Indian Springs =

Indian Springs may refer to:

== Places in the United States ==
- Indian Springs, California, a town in Nevada County
- Indian Springs (Colorado), a hot spring in, and previous known as, Idaho Springs, Colorado
- Indian Springs, Florida, a community in Jacksonville
- Indian Springs, Georgia, a census-designated place in Catoosa County
- Indian Springs, Indiana, an unincorporated place in Martin County
- Indian Springs, Maryland, an unincorporated community in western Washington County
- Indian Springs, Nevada, a town in Clark County
- Indian Springs, Ohio, an unincorporated place (formerly a city) in Butler County
- Indian Springs, Texas, a census-designated place in Polk County
- Indian Springs Metropark, a park in Oakland County, Michigan
- Indian Springs Village, Alabama, a town in Shelby County

== Institutions ==
- Indian Springs Mall, also known as the Indian Springs Shopping Center, was an American enclosed mall in Kansas City, Kansas
- Indian Springs Middle School, a middle school in Columbia City, Indiana
- Indian Springs School, a boarding and day school in Indian Springs Village, Alabama

== Other uses ==
- Treaty of Indian Springs (1821) and Treaty of Indian Springs (1825), two treaties between the Creek Indians and the United States
  - Indian Springs State Park, a state park in Georgia at the site of the treaties
- Indian Springs Park (Davenport, Iowa), a contributing property in the Village of East Davenport Historic District
