= Hose Station No. 4 =

- U.S. Historic district – Contributing property
- Davenport Register of Historic Properties
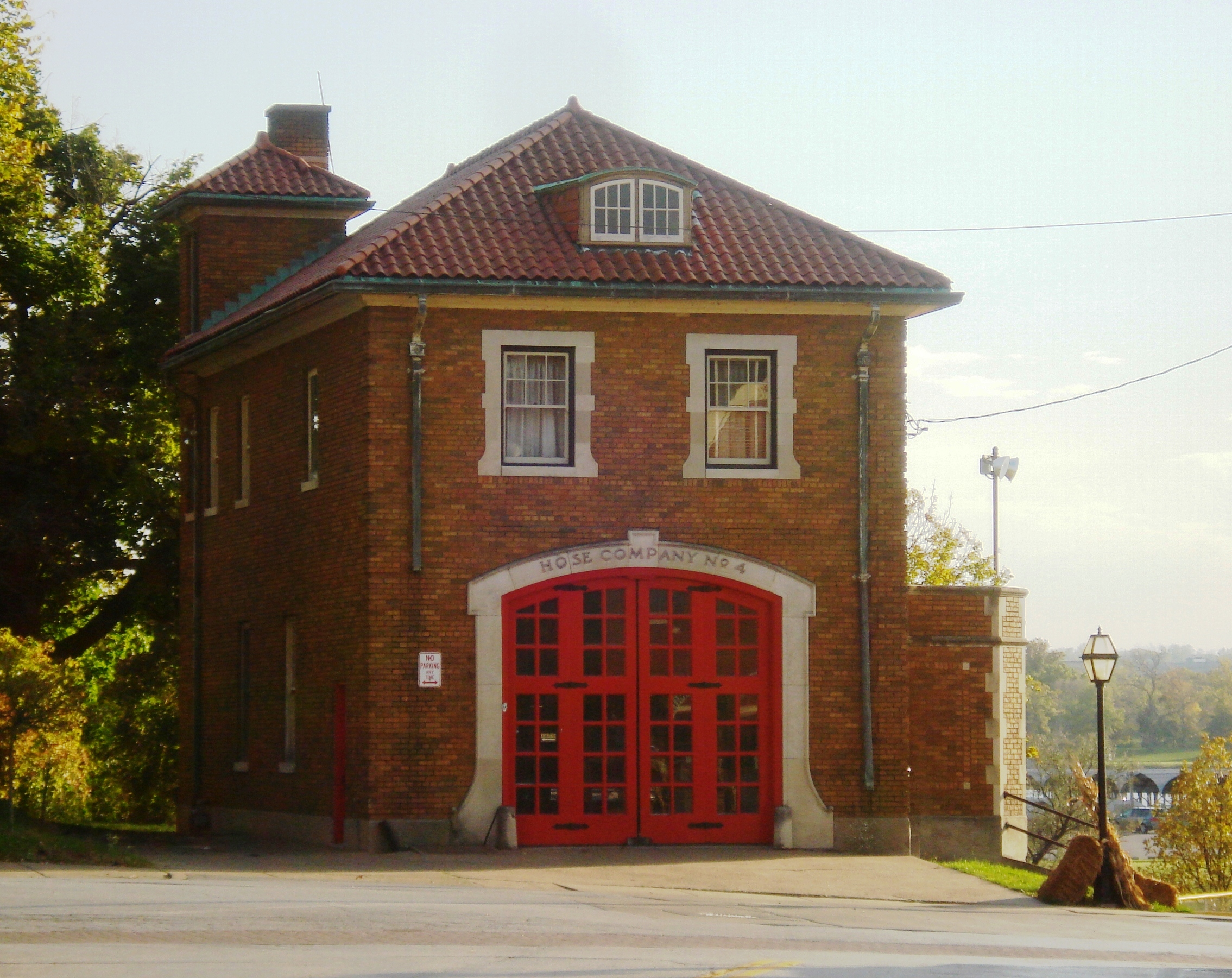

- Location within Iowa Location within the United States
- Location: 2301 E. 11th St. Davenport, Iowa
- Coordinates: 41°31′51″N 90°32′38″W
- Area: less than one acre
- Built: 1931
- Architectural style: Italianate
- Part of: Village of East Davenport (ID80001459)
- DRHP No.: 12

Significant dates
- Added to NRHP: March 17, 1980
- Designated DRHP: June 2, 1993

Hose Station No. 4 is located in the Village of East Davenport in Davenport, Iowa, United States. It is a contributing property of the Davenport Village Historic District that has been listed on the National Register of Historic Places since 1980. The fire station was individually listed on the Davenport Register of Historic Properties in 1993. It is one of two old fire stations on the east side of the city that are still in existence. The other one is Hose Station No. 3. The building sits adjacent to Lindsay Park and now houses the International Fire Museum.

== History ==
The first group of volunteer firefighters in Davenport were organized in 1856 and called the Independent Fire Engine and Hose Company. The city's first firehouse, Hose Station No. 1, was built on Perry Street in 1877 for the Fire King Engine 2nd Hose Company. In the first decades of the 20th-century, the city built other small hose stations throughout the city such as Hose Station No. 4.

The Davenport Fire Antique & Restoration Society was formed by four members of the Davenport Fire Department in 1984. They acquired Hose Station No. 4 and opened the museum in 1986. The museum contains artifacts and photographs pertaining to firefighting throughout the world. It includes a 1951 Mack pumper from Riverdale, Iowa.

== Architecture ==
The station was designed in the Italianate style. It features a rectangular plan, hipped roof covered in tile and a short tower in the back where the hoses dried. The red brick exterior features quoined corners in brick. A single pair of fire-house doors, behind which the firefighting equipment was stored, fronted Eleventh Street. The pedestrian entrance was along the side of the building. Two large rectangular windows are above the fire-house doors and a dormer is on the roof above the main façade.
