= Camp McClellan =

Camp McClellan may refer to:

- Camp McClellan (California), a post in California in 1861 during the American Civil War
- Camp McClellan, original name of Fort McClellan, a United States Army installation located adjacent to the city of Anniston, Alabama
- Camp McClellan (Iowa), an American Civil War camp, in Davenport, Iowa
