= Penhall =

Penhall may refer to:

== Surname ==
- Bruce Penhall (born 1957), American professional motorcycle speedway racer; actor
- Darren Penhall (born 1972), English professional darts player
- Gertrude Penhall (1846–1929), American civic leader and clubwoman
- Joe Penhall (born 1967), English-Australian playwright and screenwriter
- William Penhall (1858–1882), English mountaineer
