= Diedrich Busch House =

Historic house in Iowa, United States

- U.S. National Register of Historic Places
- U.S. Historic district – Contributing property
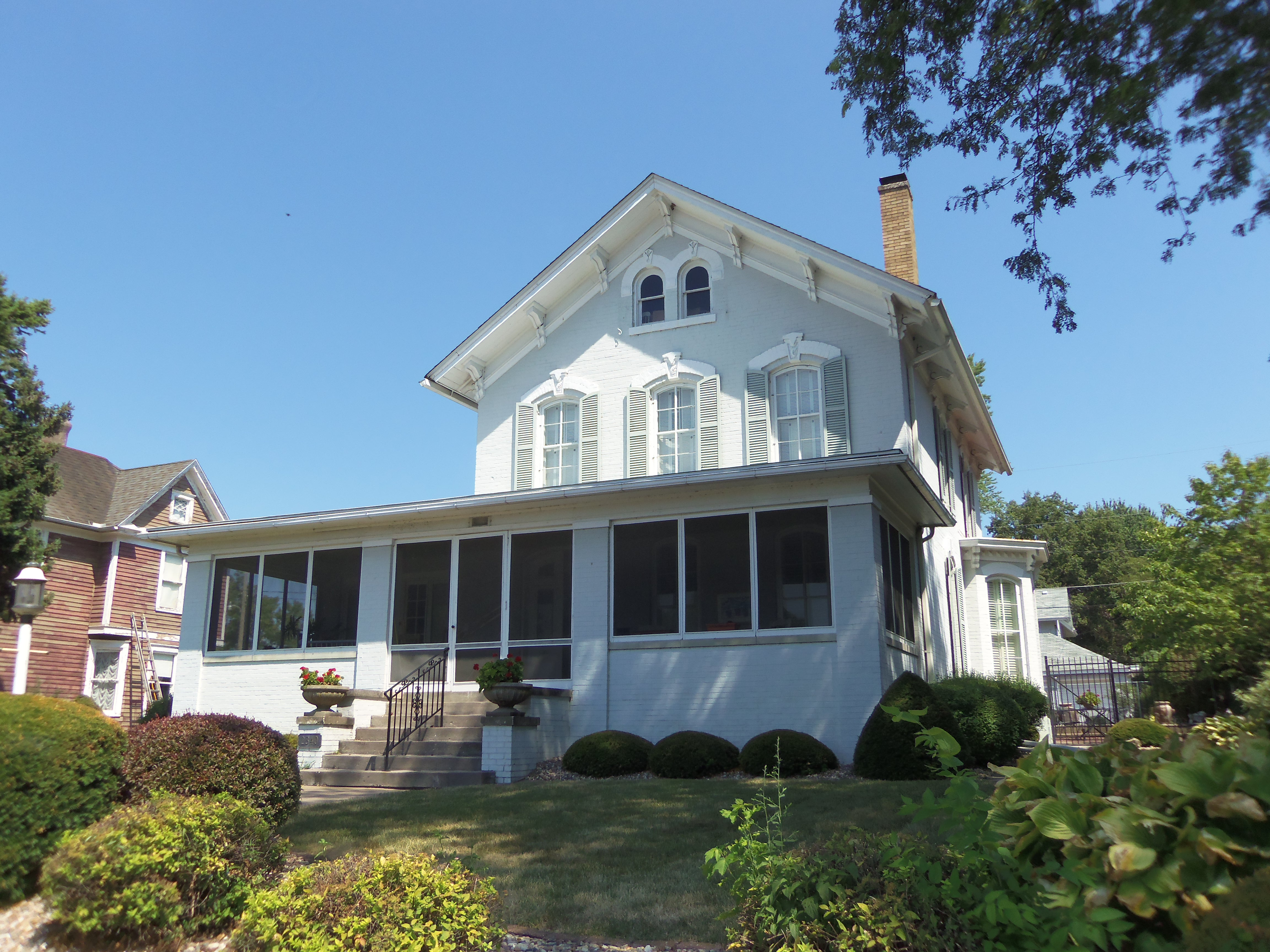

- Location within Iowa Location within the United States
- Location: 2340 E. 11th St., Davenport, Iowa
- Coordinates: 41°31′52″N 90°32′33″W
- Area: less than one acre
- Built: 1877
- Architectural style: Vernacular (McClelland)
- Part of: McClellan Heights Historic District (ID84000328)
- MPS: Davenport MRA
- NRHP reference No.: 84001324
- Added to NRHP: July 27, 1984

The Diedrich Busch House is a historic building located on the east side of Davenport, Iowa, United States. It was individually listed on the National Register of Historic Places, and as a contributing property in the McClellan Heights Historic District in 1984.

== Diedrich Busch ==
Diedrich Busch (1827–1893) was born in the town of Hamminkeln in Prussia He was apprenticed to a shoemaker, which became his trade for most of his life. He immigrated to the United States in 1853, landing in New York on July 3, and then made his way to Davenport. Busch was married twice. His first wife died young and then he married Emma Balcke, whose father was the pastor at the German Methodist Episcopal Church. Busch owned and operated a grocery store in the Village of East Davenport and the family lived above the store for several years before this house was built in 1877. Over the years he had made a sizeable investment in real estate on the east side of Davenport where he developed many houses and commercial structures.

== Architecture ==
While this house sits geographically in the McClellan Heights neighborhood, architecturally it fits more properly in the neighboring Village of East Davenport. East Davenport was an industrial town that began in the 1850s and was annexed into the city of Davenport by the time the decade ended. The house follows a popular Vernacular style of architecture from the mid to late 19th-century Davenport known as the McClelland style. It shows influences from other architectural styles as well, such as the bracketed eaves and the polygonal window bay on the east side that suggests the Italianate style. The round arch windows in the attic is another popular feature in Davenport homes built in this era. The veranda that wraps around from the front of the house to the west side was probably added in the early 20th-century. The same is true for the sunroom in the re-entrant angle between the houses main block and the pavilion on the west side.
