= Hose Station No. 3 =

- Davenport Hose Station No. 3
- U.S. National Register of Historic Places
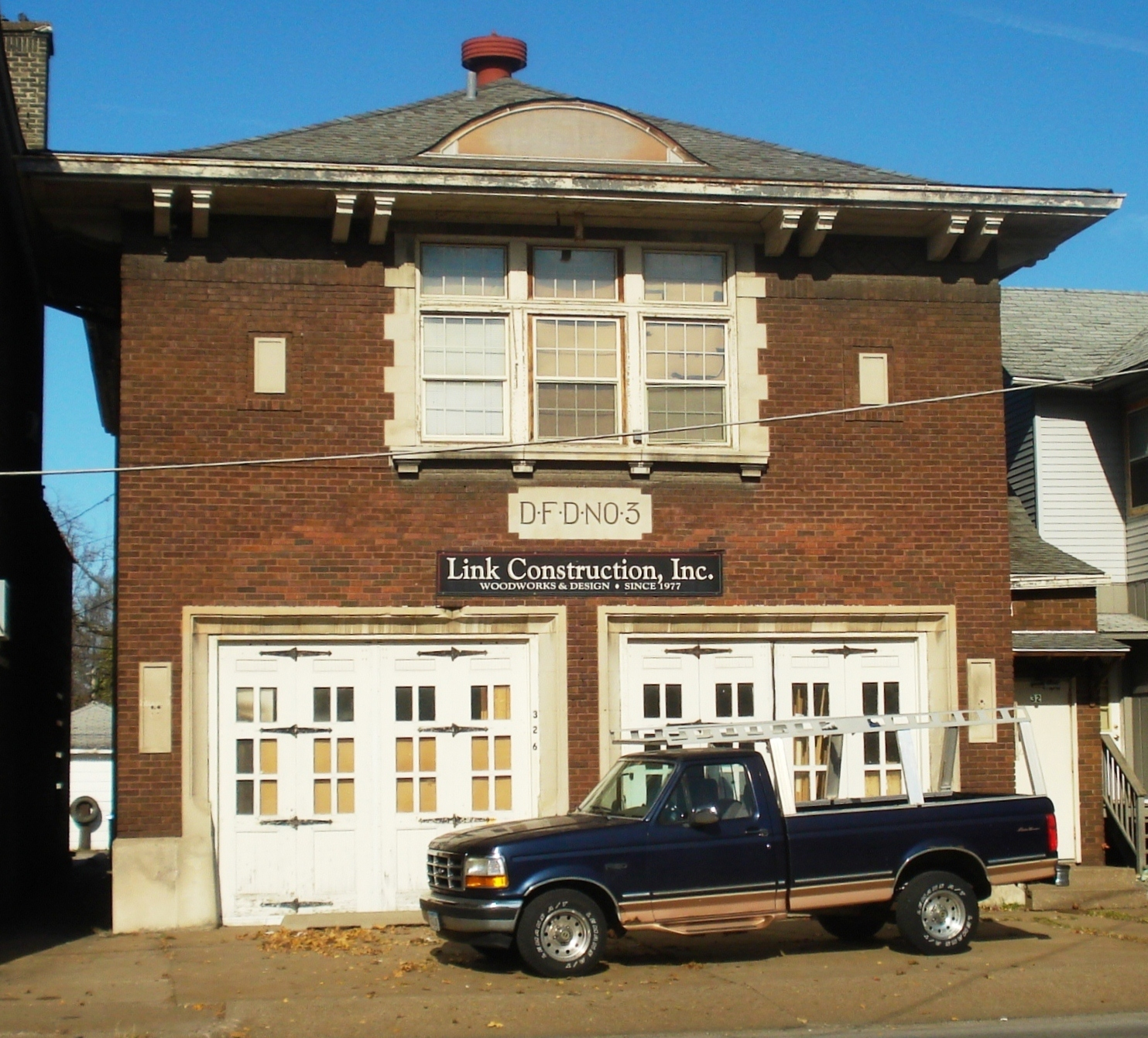

- Location within Iowa Location within the United States
- Location: 326 E. Locust St; Davenport, Iowa
- Coordinates: 41°31′27″N 90°34′35″W
- Area: less than one acre
- Built: 1921
- Architectural style: Late 19th and Early 20th Century Revivals
- MPS: Davenport MRA
- NRHP reference No.: 84001336
- Added to NRHP: July 27, 1984

Davenport Hose Station No. 3 is located in a commercial area on the east side of Davenport, Iowa, United States. It has been listed on the National Register of Historic Places since 1984. The building is one of two historic former fire stations on the east side that are still in existence. The other one is Hose Station No. 4 in the Village of East Davenport.

== History ==
The first group of volunteer firefighters in Davenport were organized in 1856 and called the Independent Fire Engine and Hose Company. The city's first firehouse, Hose Station No. 1, was built on Perry Street in 1877 for the Fire King Engine 2nd Hose Company. After the turn of the 20th-century, the city built other small hose stations as the city grew. Hose Station No. 3 is one of those stations. It was built in 1921 on property that had previously held a livery and boarding stable. The firehouse was discontinued in 1966 when larger and more modern stations were built by the city.

== Architecture ==
Like other Davenport firehouses of this era, Hose Station No. 3 was designed using Mediterranean themed architecture (Italianate, Renaissance Revival). While smaller than Davenport's main Central Fire Station, it is larger than the single-stall hose stations that were located throughout the city's residential neighborhoods. The two-story structure follows a rectangular plan with a hipped roof and modified Gibbs surrounds on the second-floor windows of the main facade. These were common elements that are found on the smaller stations as well. The extremely wide eaves and shallow roof pitch reflects the American Foursquare house architecture that was popular in Davenport during the first two decades of the 20th century.
