= Davenport Water Co. Pumping Station No. 2 =

- U.S. National Register of Historic Places
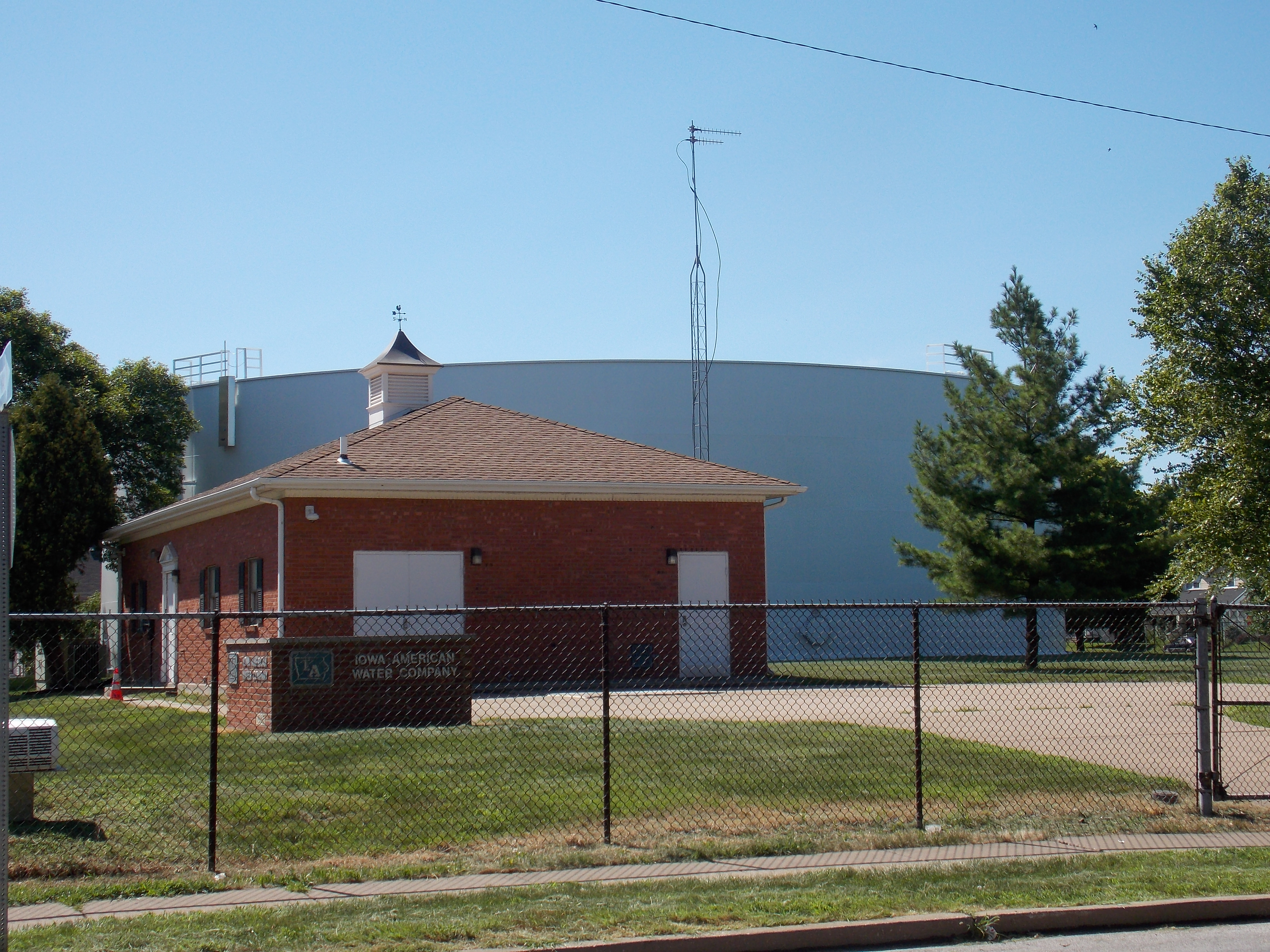
- The 1986 building that replaced the historic structure

- Location within Iowa Location within the United States
- Location: 1416 Ripley St. Davenport, Iowa
- Coordinates: 41°32′4″N 90°34′43″W
- Area: 2.4 acres (0.97 ha)
- Built: 1884
- Architectural style: Italianate
- MPS: Davenport MRA
- NRHP reference No.: 84001338
- Added to NRHP: April 5, 1984

The Davenport Water Co. Pumping Station No. 2, also known as the Ripley Street Pumping Station No. 2, is a historic building located in central Davenport, Iowa, United States. It was listed on the National Register of Historic Places in 1984. The facility was originally built in 1884 to address problems with the city's water system, and had a reservoir that could hold 5 million US gallons of water. The building was subsequently replaced in 1986 by a smaller plain structure on the same property facing West 14th Street. Despite being replaced, the station remains an important part of Davenport's history, as it was an essential component of the city's water system and contributed to the growth of its residential areas above the bluff line from 1880 to 1920.

== History ==
Unlike most other municipalities in Iowa, Davenport has always had a privately run water company. A waterworks was first proposed for the city in 1856. However, the Davenport Water Company was not formed until 1873 under the leadership of Michael P. Donahue, who was granted an exclusive franchise with the city. Initially, they installed 20 miles (32 km) of water mains and 245 hydrants throughout the city. The system was used to fight its first fire in 1874 and it was promoted as a way to fight cholera.

There were some problems with the new water system in Davenport. Water pressure was significantly lowered if the hydrants were used to fight a fire. In 1884 the company built the Ripley Street Pumping Station No. 2. The facility had a reservoir that can hold 5 million US gallons (19,000 m^{3}) of water. The pumping system was operated by a vertical set of compound Clapp and Jones Pumps and a set of Duplex Gordon Steam Pumps.

By 1892 the company had expanded the water system to 37 miles (60 km) of water mains and 400 hydrants. A mechanical filtering system installed the previous year helped make the company's product more saleable and more properties in the city were converted from private wells. Another pumping station was built around the turn of the 20th century along East River Drive near the Village of East Davenport.

This facility is significant because of its association with the development of the Davenport Water Company and the growth of the residential areas of the city above the bluff line in the period of 1880-1920. It was further enhanced by the building's continued original use and retaining most of its integrity.

== Architecture ==
The exterior treatment of Pumping Station #2 was similar to many other late 19th-century industrial buildings in Davenport. It featured brick construction, walls that were articulated as panels by pilasters, and a simple corbel table. The use of buff-colored brick for the window heads was less common. The building was also more ornate at one time. The two-story pavilion section had a crested, mansard roof. Until about 1890 only the three-panel south wing was in existence. The north wing and the extension of the south wing by two panels were later additions.
