= McClellan Heights Historic District =

Historic district in Iowa, United States

- U.S. National Register of Historic Places
- U.S. Historic district
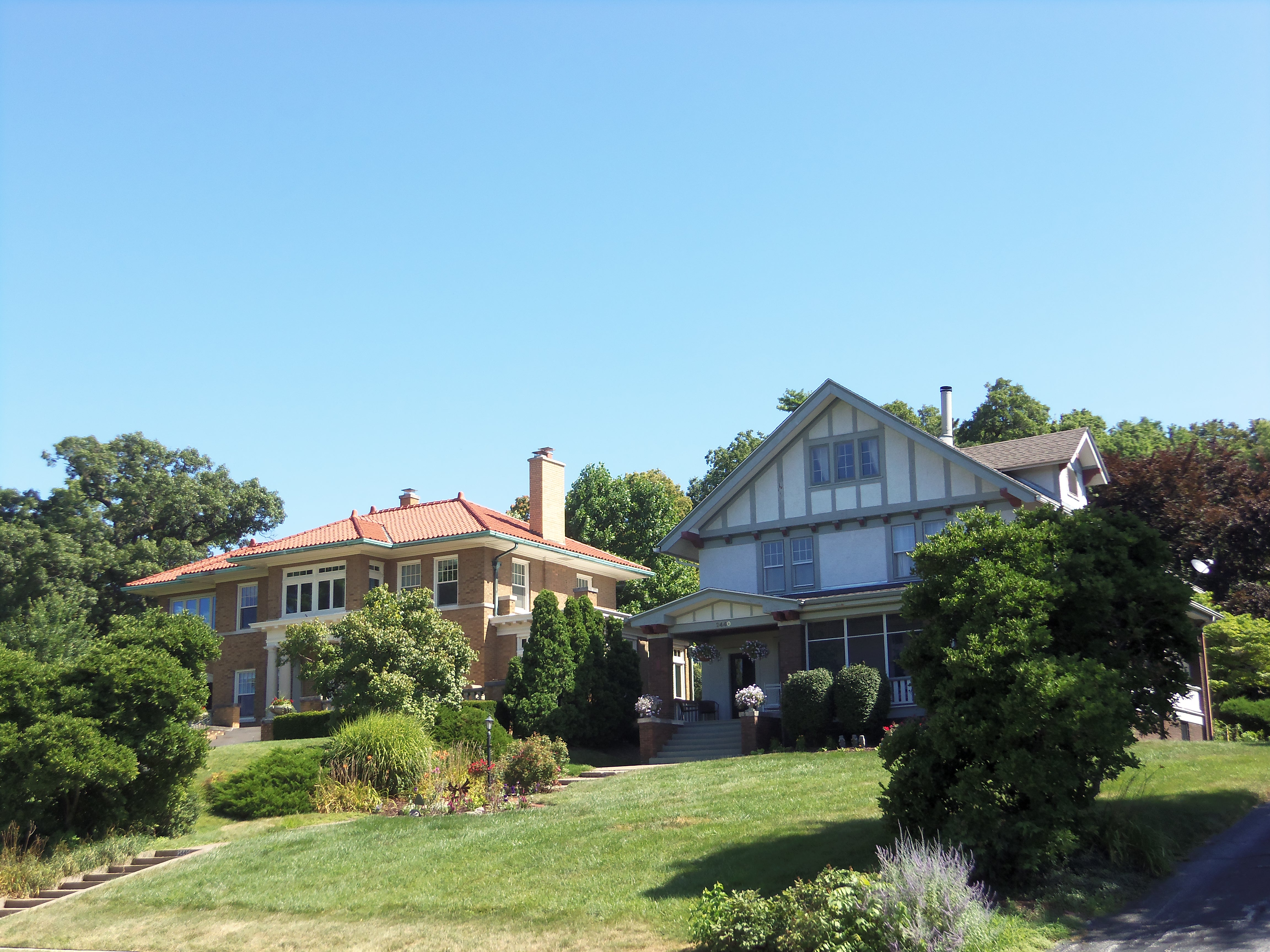
- Houses on River Street that overlook Lindsay Park

- Location within Iowa Location within the United States

- Location within city
- Location: Roughly bounded by city limits, E. River Dr., East St., Jersey Ridge and Middle Rds., Davenport, Iowa
- Coordinates: 41°31′55″N 90°32′14″W
- Area: 188.2 acres (76.2 ha)
- Built: 1905-1940
- Architect: Temple and Burrows, et al.
- Architectural style: Late 19th and Early 20th Century American Movements, Late 19th and 20th Century Revivals
- MPS: Davenport MRA
- NRHP reference No.: 84000328
- Added to NRHP: November 1, 1984

The McClellan Heights Historic District is a 188.2-acre (76.2 ha) historic district in Davenport, Iowa, United States. It was listed on the National Register of Historic Places in 1984, at which time it included 354 buildings deemed to contribute to the historic character of the area.

== Description ==
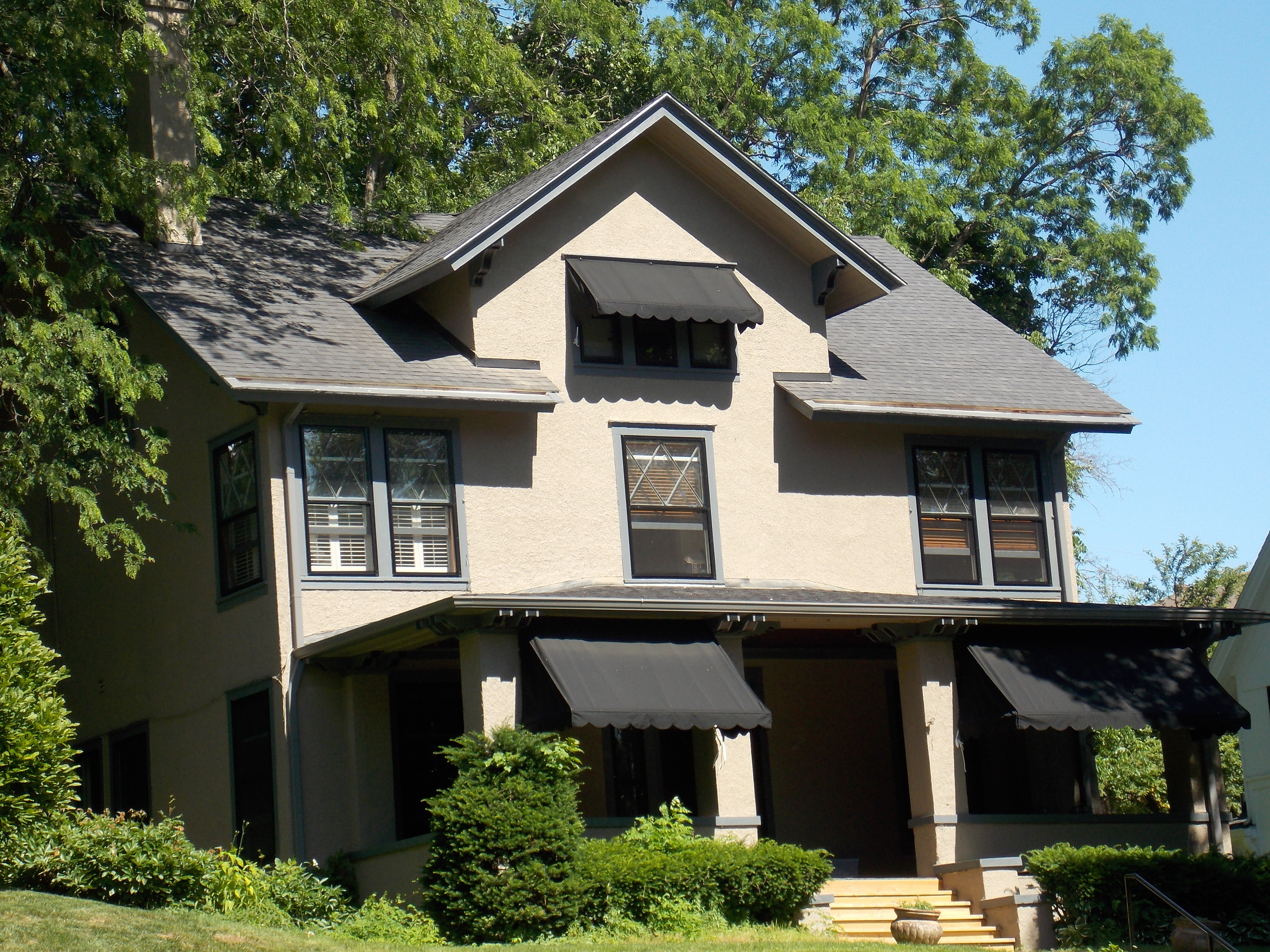
A house on Glenwood Avenue

McClellan Heights is the largest neighborhood in the east end of Davenport. It is located east of the Village of East Davenport. It runs from Jersey Ridge Road to the Bettendorf city limits, and from River Drive to Middle Road. Dating from 1894 to 1940, four hundred houses make up the McClellan Heights neighborhood. The neighborhood is made up of many hills and ravines. The streets follow the topography which requires many winding roads and odd-shaped lots. The southern portion of McClellan Heights is very wooded which adds to the attractiveness of the neighborhood. Developed from south to north, including four very large mansions built before World War I, the area became popular with upper-middle-class residents. The area was mostly settled by Dutch and New England immigrants. The park-like setting, and proximity to and view of the river, have kept this neighborhood fashionable even today. The houses remain in good to excellent condition. The few brick streets that run through the neighborhood also remain in excellent condition.

== History ==
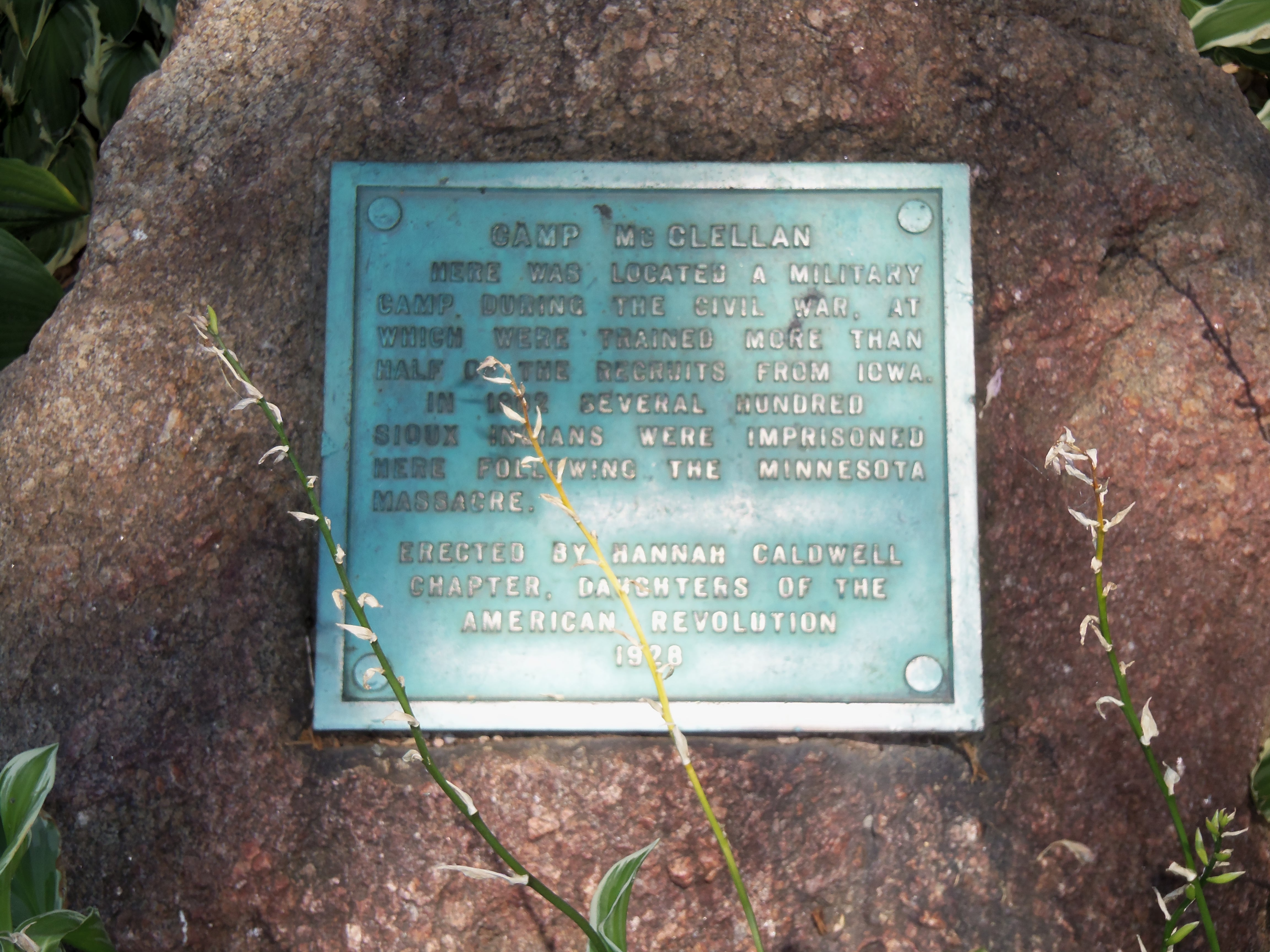
Camp McClellan marker in Lindsay Park

The area was known as Camp McClellan during the American Civil War, and gives the neighborhood its name. It was the largest of the five Union Army training camps in and around the city of Davenport. The land the camp was built on belonged to Thomas Russel Allen of St. Louis, Missouri and consisted of over 300 acres (120 ha). Part of Camp McClellan was set aside to become Camp Kearney where the federal government imprisoned 277 male members of the Sioux tribe, 16 women and two children and one member of the Ho-Chunk tribe. The men were involved in the Dakota War of 1862 in Minnesota and were held in the camp as prisoners because President Abraham Lincoln commuted their death sentences. After the war ended in 1865 the camp was decommissioned, and the buildings were torn down after the Native Americans left Camp Kearney in 1866.

The land was returned to Ann R. Allen, Thomas Allen's widow. In June 1900 the Grand Army of the Republic (GAR) held an encampment on the site. A proposal was submitted to the Iowa Legislature to turn the former camp into a state park. It had the support of Iowa's Civil War veterans groups, the GAR, and local citizens, but nothing came of it. By the early 20th century the Allen family had relocated to Belgium. There had been several attempts to purchase the land and develop it, but they all failed. A promoter made a personal trip to Belgium to visit with the family and he was able to acquire the land on behalf of the Camp McClellan Improvement Company. William Richter was president of the company and Amos Cutter, who had developed what is now the Oak Lane Historic District, was placed in charge of developing McClellan Heights.

There were several restrictions imposed on those who built in the subdivision. One house could not obstruct the view of another, each house was to be double the cost of the lot it was built on, and commercial activity was not permitted. There was also an officer who was responsible for the beatification of the subdivision, making repairs, caring for the plant life and weeding, and snow and ice removal.

== Architecture ==
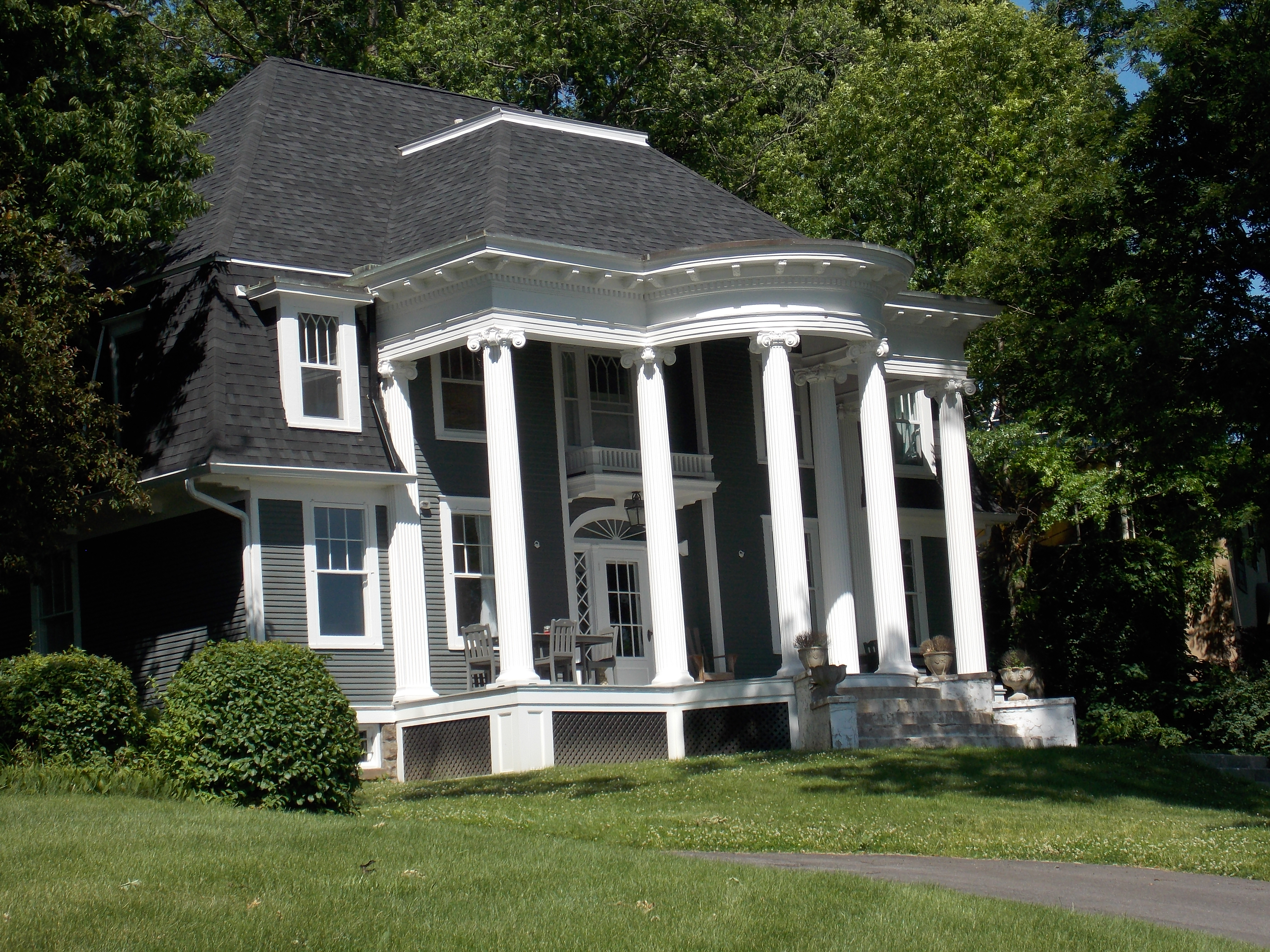
A house on River Street

Housing styles in McClellan Heights tend to follow a free-form eclecticism that was characteristic of the period rather than a desire to recreate classical architectural styles. Elements of past styles were utilized here, but they were employed in a less literal fashion by using a few details to suggest rather than recreate the earlier forms. The revival styles that were more commonly used in the neighborhood were Tudor Revival and Mediterranean Revival as well as the Colonial Revival forms from New England to Dutch Colonial and Georgian. The Prairie School style is somewhat ubiquitous throughout the neighborhood, but again, not in a literal sense. There are only a few textbook examples of the style in McClellan Heights. Instead, it found its expression in the use of broad roofs, horizontal window openings, and placing upper story windows just below the eaves. Its use was adapted by combining the Prairie School style with the revival styles as well as two other typically American styles that are found throughout the neighborhood, American Craftsman and American Foursquare.

== Contributing properties ==
- Diedrich Busch House
- Lindsay Park
