= Pierce School No. 13 =

- U.S. National Register of Historic Places
- U.S. Historic district – Contributing property
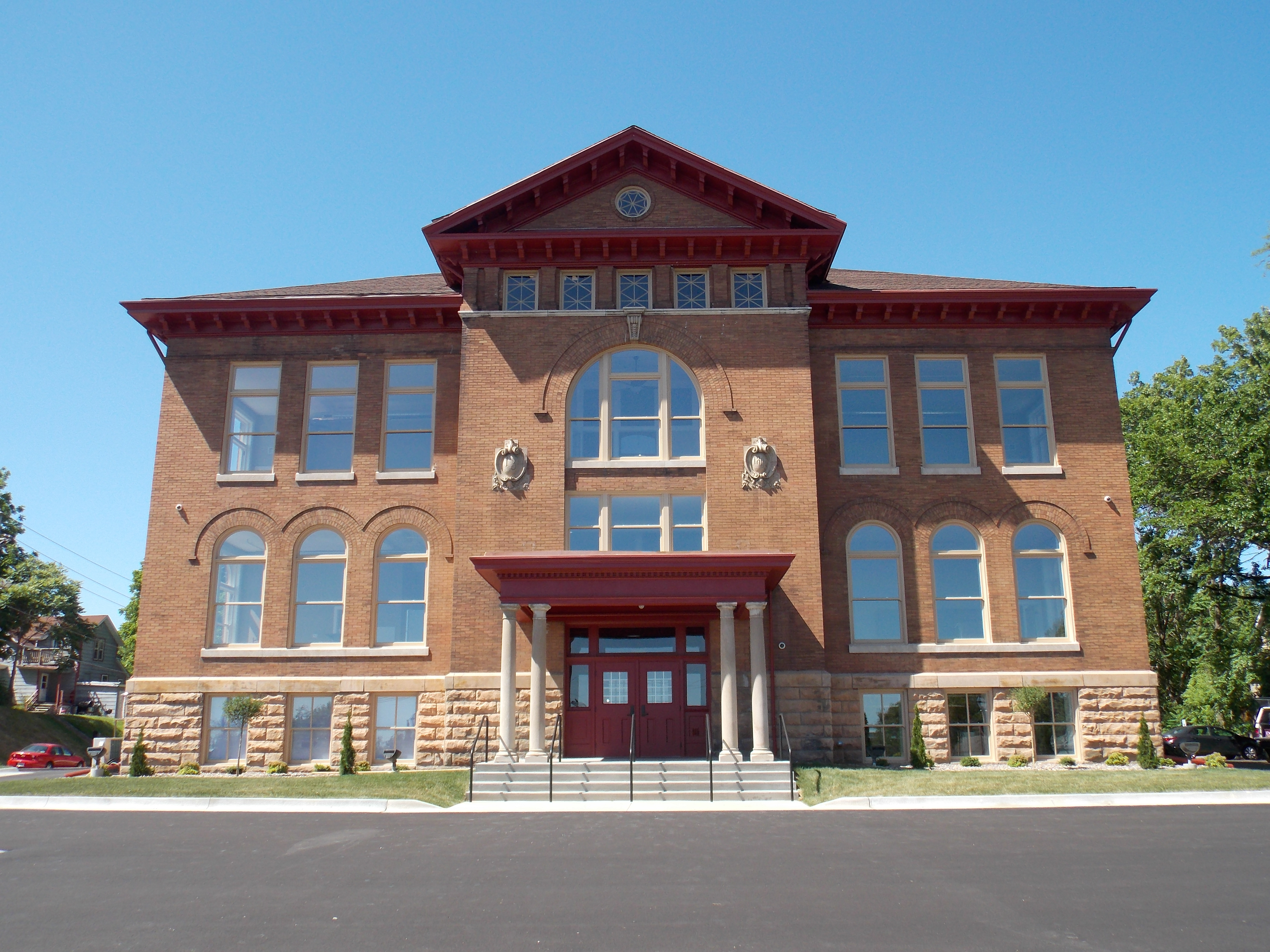

- Location within Iowa Location within the United States
- Location: 2212 E. 12th St. Davenport, Iowa
- Coordinates: 41°31′56″N 90°32′42″W
- Area: 3 acres (1.2 ha)
- Built: 1899
- Architect: Parke T. Burrows
- Architectural style: Renaissance Revival
- Part of: Village of East Davenport (ID80001459)
- MPS: Davenport MRA
- NRHP reference No.: 83002486
- Added to NRHP: July 7, 1983

Pierce School No. 13 is a historic building located on the east side of Davenport, Iowa, United States. Pierce School Lofts, as the building is now called, contains 41 market-rate apartments. It was included as a contributing property in the Village of East Davenport Historic District in 1980. The building was individually listed on the National Register of Historic Places in 1983.

== History ==
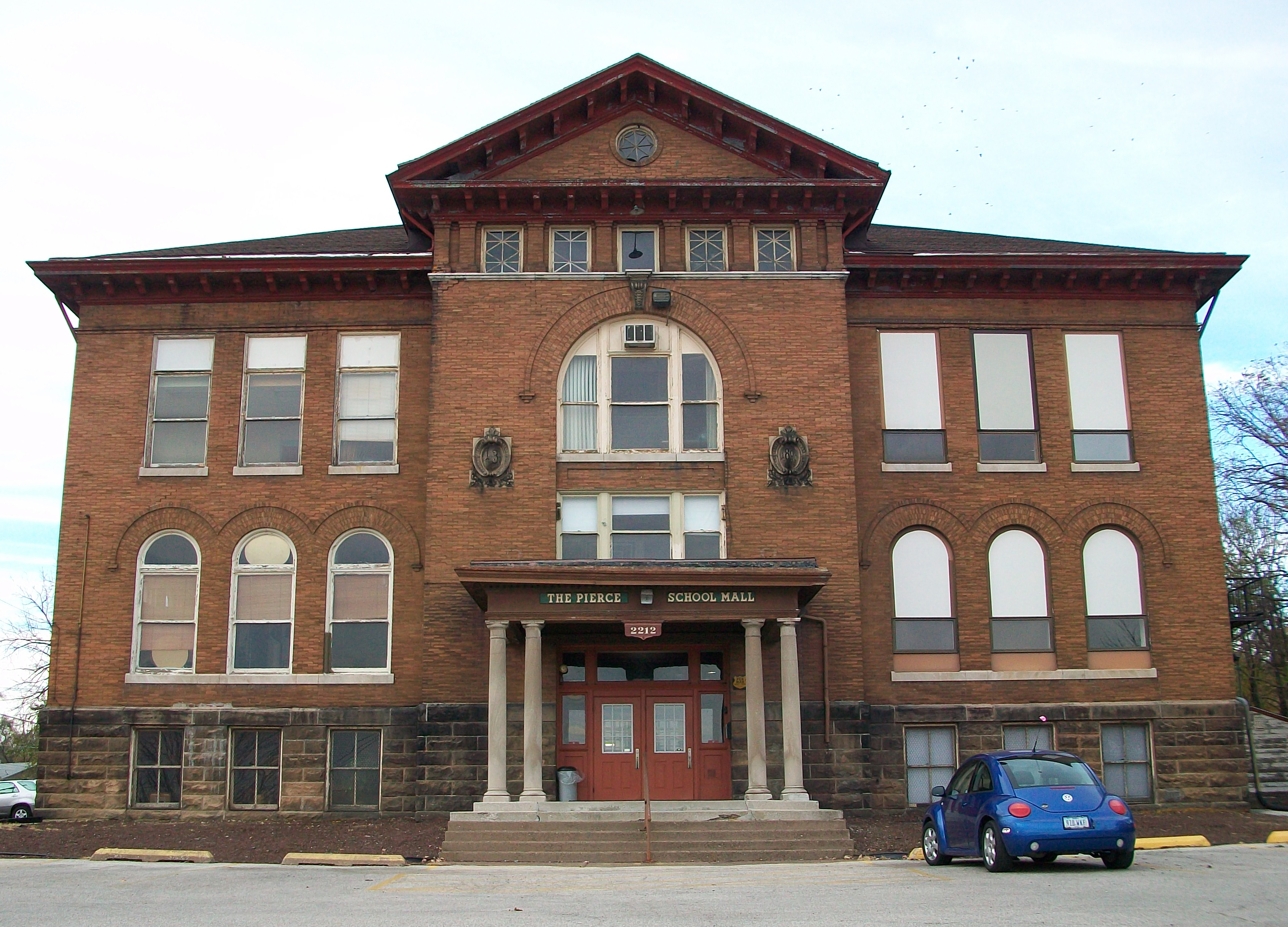
The building prior to renovation as loft apartments.

The building was constructed in 1899 as School No. 13. It was one of eight schools that opened during the 30 year administration of Superintendent J.B. Young. It replaced School #1, which was located at Mound and 11th Streets, and School #9, located at Grand Avenue and Locust Street. The school's name was changed to Pierce in 1908. Around 1919 the Davenport schools adopted the "6-3-3" system and Pierce continued as an elementary school serving the east side of Davenport. An evaluation of school facilities was done by the school system in the 1920s and with the growth in the student population in the 1930s twelve schools, including Pierce, were replaced with newer buildings.

The building ceased being a school in 1940. By the end of the 1940s Mast Development Company, a research and development firm, made the building its headquarters. They built an addition onto the back of the building in 1977 that more than doubled the size of the structure. Mast moved out of the building in 1986. The following year the building was converted into Pierce School Mall, an office and retail facility. The back addition was used by a local appliance store as a warehouse. A 2005 plan to convert the building into condominiums faltered. In 2015 a $10 million renovation project to convert the facility into 41 market-rate apartments was begun. The project received historic tax credits and workforce housing tax credits from the Iowa Economic Development Authority. It was completed the following year.

== Architecture ==
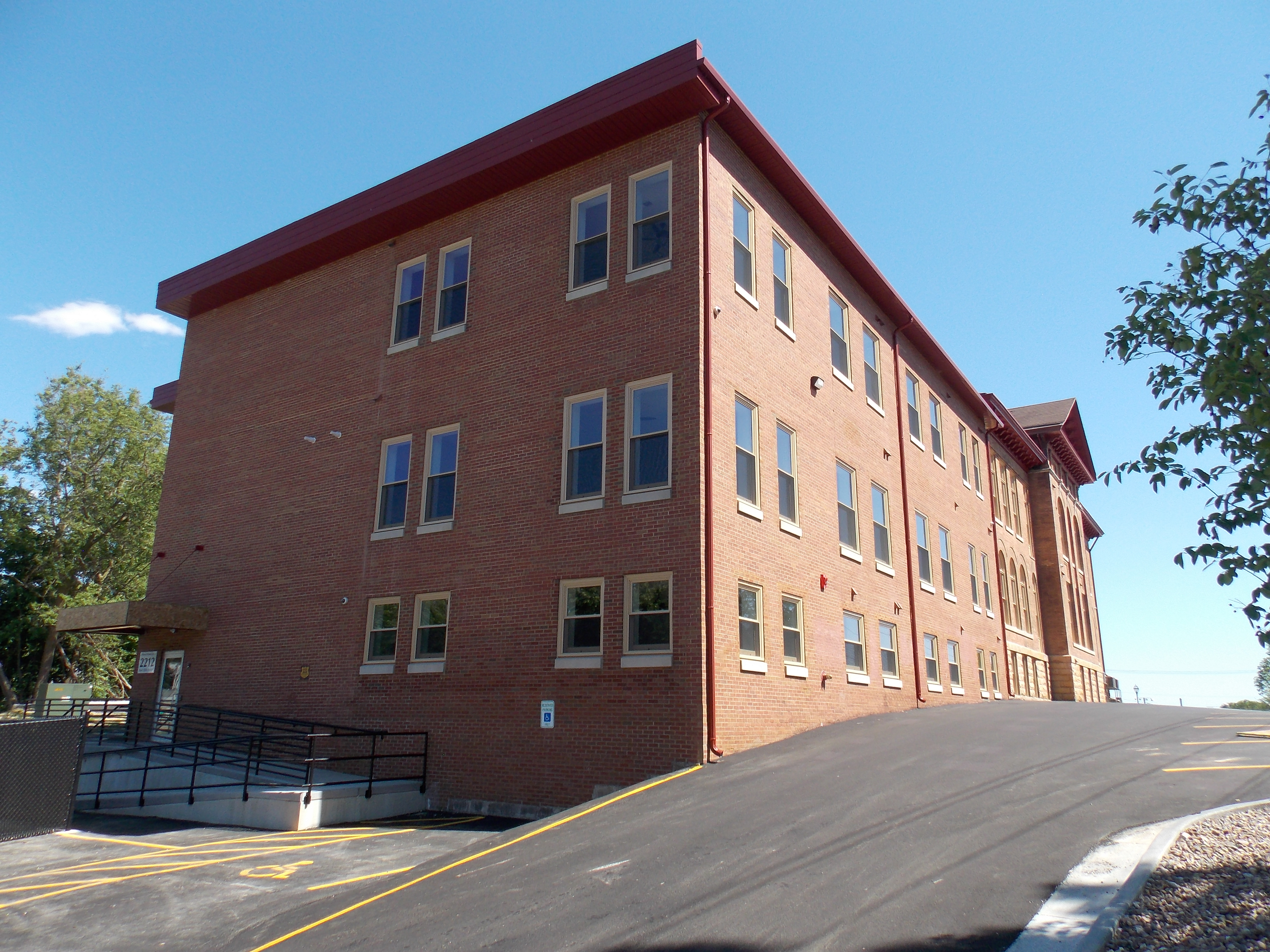
The 1977 addition

The Pierce School building was designed by Davenport architect Parke T. Burrows of the local firm Clausen & Burrows. The square block building is two stories high on a raised basement. In the center of each elevation is a projecting pavilion that is capped with a triangular pediment. It is built with red bricks and the basement is faced with large blocks of dressed limestone. The building features a hipped roof with bracketed eaves. It has round arch windows on the main floor and rectangular windows on the second floor and on the basement level. A columned canopy covers the main entrance. The grouping of windows beneath round-arched brick arcades reflect the Richardsonian Romanesque style that was popular in the late 19th century. It is combined with a return to Neoclassicism, which is found in its symmetry of form and massing, the pavilion pediments, and the small windows in deep reveals that form a frieze.
