= Gertrude Penhall =

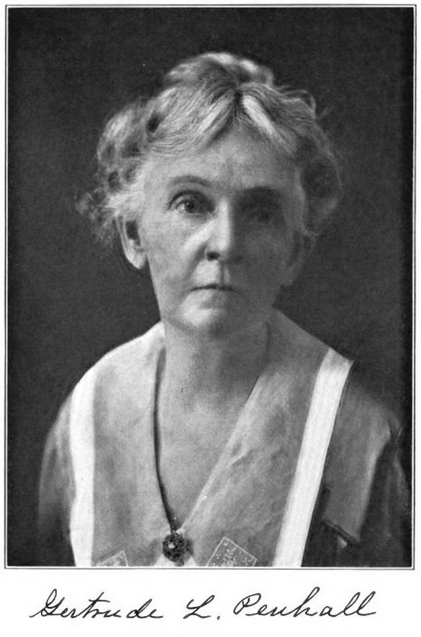
Gertrude Leah Taylor Barker Penhall

Gertrude Penhall (also known as Gertrude Leah Barker-Penhall; 1846 – December 10, 1929), a California pioneer and early settler, was also an American civic leader and clubwoman. She was one of the oldest residents of Nevada County, California where she spent practically all of her life. Penhall took an active part in civic and social affairs, as well as movements that had for their aim the improvement of the county and that tended to enhance the comfort and happiness of its people.

== Biography ==
Gertrude Leah Taylor was born in Mississippi, 1846. Her father, William Taylor, was born in Tennessee. When he was a young boy, his parents removed to Carroll County, Mississippi, where he received his education. There, he married Katherine Cameron, a native of Alabama, of Scotch descent. Both families owned large plantations in the South. Ten children were born of this union. Of these, William, Robert P., Cornelius, Azalene Deolese (Mrs. A. Johns), Hugh, Kate, Allen P., and John E. died young; Penhall and Edgar Mayo, who became a resident of Burlingame, California, being the only surviving members of their immediate family.

In 1852, the father, accompanied by his two eldest sons, crossed the Great Plains to California during the gold excitement; and the first permanent camping place was made on the present site of the Empire Mine southeast of the city limits of Grass Valley, California. The father was so impressed with the resources of Nevada County, California that he returned to Mississippi and in 1853, brought his wife and the rest of his family to California, crossing the plains with an ox-team train, and located in Penn Valley, 7 miles (11 km) south of Grass Valley, adjacent to the Rough and Ready mining district. On this ranch, the Taylor family of children were reared. The land was highiy productive; fruit trees were planted, and grain, hay and garden products were raised in great profusion. The father died at the age of 86; the mother was but 56 years old when she died.

Penhall lived in Mississippi until she was six or seven years of age, when she accompanied her parents to California across the plains in a train of covered wagons drawn by oxen. Her father, having made the trip across the plains and desert the year before, was naturally selected as captain of the train; and with his accustomed ability to manage men and do things he piloted the large train safely across to the Pacific Coast-no easy task, in view of the months of travel. In Penn Valley, she attended grammar school, while she lived on her father's ranch. Then she attended a private school at Indian Springs; and afterward she pursued her studies at the Poston private school for young ladies at Marysville, California.

Penhall was first married at the home of her parents, on November 21, 1867, to Charles Barker, who was born in New Hampshire, June 28, 1826, a son of William H. and Sarah Barker. Charles Barker came to California across the plains in 1849 and settled at Buena Vista where he engaged in farming and dairying in early days. At the time of his marriage, Mr. Barker resided in Nevada City and held the position of county tax collector for Nevada County. In 1869, he purchased a home place of 15 acres (6.1 ha) in Grass Valley, set out a pear and apple orchard, and also raised vegetables. The old house on the place was remodeled into a comfortable residence, and here the Barker children were born, William H., Charles Herbert, Gertrude, Genevieve C., Charles Herbert, Katheryne, and Edgar Earl. Mr. Barker died at the home ranch, October 28, 1908. On September 8, 1910, she married Bennet Ackerly Penhall, a prominent mining operator of Nevada County.

Penhall was a charter member of the Aurora Chapter of the Eastern Star and was its second matron. She served as president of The Woman's Improvement Club, and was a member of the Woman's Federated Club. She served as auditor for the northern district of California for a number of years. She was also a member of the Agricultural Club of Nevada County and of the executive board of the local chapter of the American Red Cross. Penhall served as vice-president of the Relief Society, and was chair of St. Catherine's Guild of the Emmanuel Episcopal Church of Grass Valley. She was prominently associated with the California Federation of Women's Clubs, Northern Branch.

Penhall died in Grass Valley, December 10, 1929, following a two-week illness,. having been a Nevada County resident for 77 years.
