= Indian Springs Mall =

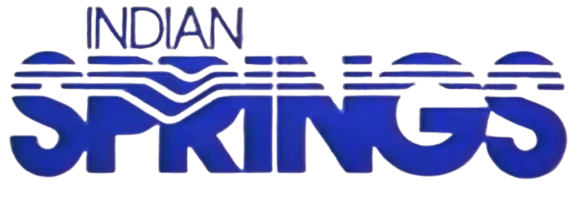
- Location: Kansas City, KS
- Coordinates: 39.11°N 94.69°W
- Address: 849 N 47th St, Kansas City, KS 66102
- Opened: September, 1971
- Closed: 2016
- Demolished: 2016
- Developer: Copaken, White & Blitt
- Architect: Chris P. Ramos
- Num. of stores: 83
- Num. of anchor tenants: 3
- Floor area: 716,000 square feet (66,500 m^{2})
- Floors: 2

The Indian Springs Mall, also known as the Indian Springs Shopping Center, was an American enclosed mall in Kansas City, Kansas. Demolition of the mall began in February 2016. It was built by Copaken, White & Blitt (now Copaken Brooks).

== History and operations ==
Until its closure, Indian Springs Mall was home to The Children's Museum. The high crime rate and other factors common to the indoor mall format led to the eventual decline and closing of Indian Springs. It became a dead mall in the mid-1990s but the doors remained open for over ten more years, despite the lack of retailers. As of 2011, nothing had taken place yet as for the conversion. In 2011, it was given a new green and gold paint scheme, replacing the mauve and teal colors added during a major update done in the mid-1980s that included new canopies at the entrances highlighted with chrome, glass brick and neon, and inside the mall were new indirect lighting replacing the large 1970s era light sculpture chandeliers, revised planters, benches and fountains in the revised design and color scheme. The mall was demolished in 2016.

=== Tenants ===
Indian Springs Mall opened in September, 1971. The mall's original anchor stores were the department stores JCPenney, Montgomery Ward, and Macy's (whose space was later occupied by Dillard's).

Before the original mall was shuttered in 2001, Dillard's left the mall first in 1997, followed by JCPenney later that year due to an under-performing store, and finally Montgomery Ward in early 2001 (due to national chain's bankruptcy) with other retailers shuttered that year.

=== Features ===
Some the mall's unique aspects were its many fountains; many nearly flush at floor level without guardrails (barriers were added in the 1980s face lift), a full-sized inside walking maze on the bottom floor and a large seasonal "talking Christmas tree" where children could relate their Christmas wishes to the interactive tree (via intercom nestled inside the limbs).

=== Cinemas ===
It also featured two different movie theaters; one on each level. The original four-screen theater was a typical early no-frills design. It had a very small concession area and small screens in a long auditorium with a center aisle (commonly referred to as a "shoe box" design). In the early 1980s, a greatly improved six-screen theater was added on the lower level, including a large lobby lit with marquee lights, a full-service and greatly expanded concession stand, much larger screens and a greatly upgraded modern surround sound stereo system along with upgraded seats. Shortly after the newer theater was opened, the original four-screen theater was converted to a discount theater and also specialized in showing children's movies.

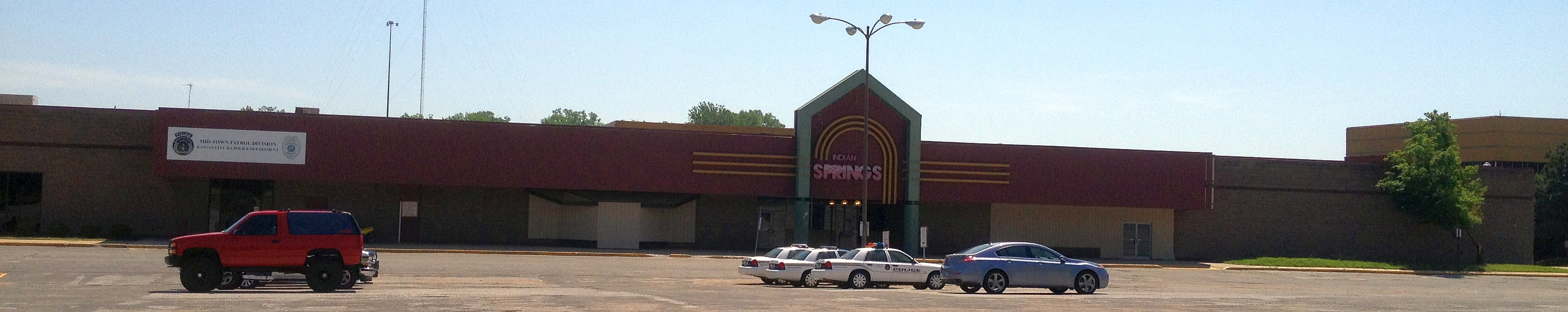
Indian Springs Mall, 2012

== See also ==
- List of shopping malls in the United States
