= Indian Springs Park (Davenport, Iowa) =

- U.S. Historic district – Contributing property
- Davenport Register of Historic Properties
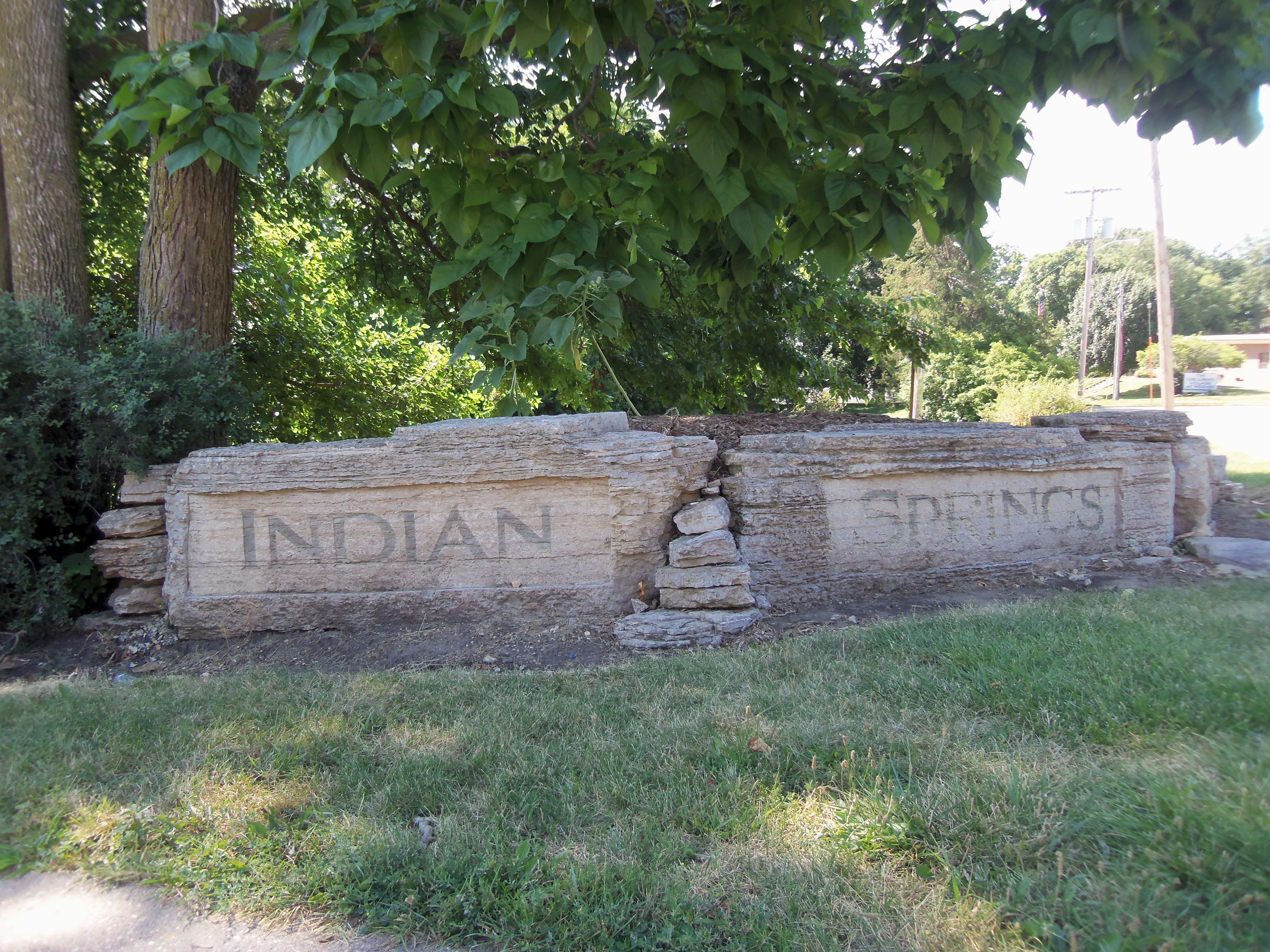
- Sign at the park entrance

- Location within Iowa Location within the United States
- Location: 1000 Spring St. Davenport, Iowa
- Coordinates: 41°31′49.6734″N 90°32′57.1878″W
- Area: 3 acres (1.2 ha)
- Part of: Village of East Davenport (ID80001459)
- DRHP No.: 47

Significant dates
- Added to NRHP: March 17, 1980
- Designated DRHP: October 7, 2005

Indian Springs Park is a public park located on the east side of Davenport, Iowa, United States. The park is located on 3 acres (1.2 ha) in a natural depression north of East River Drive and to the west of a railroad trestle bridge. The land was donated to the city in 1921 by Mrs. D.N. Richardson with the expressed purpose of creating a park. The property contains a spring that was used by Native Americans, from which the park derives its name, as well as early travelers and the areas first settlers. The spring itself was capped in 1929 and a pipe 6 inches (15 cm) in diameter directs the water into a storm drain. During the high water season in the spring the park's basin fills with spring water and shore birds return to nest. The park, which is largely undeveloped, has served as a play area for the neighborhood children, students from neighboring Hoover Elementary School, and later the day care that is housed there. The park is a contributing property in the Village of East Davenport Historic District, which was listed on the National Register of Historic Places in 1980. It was added to the Davenport Register of Historic Properties in 2005.
