= Lindsay Park (Davenport, Iowa) =

- U.S. Historic district – Contributing property
- Davenport Register of Historic Properties
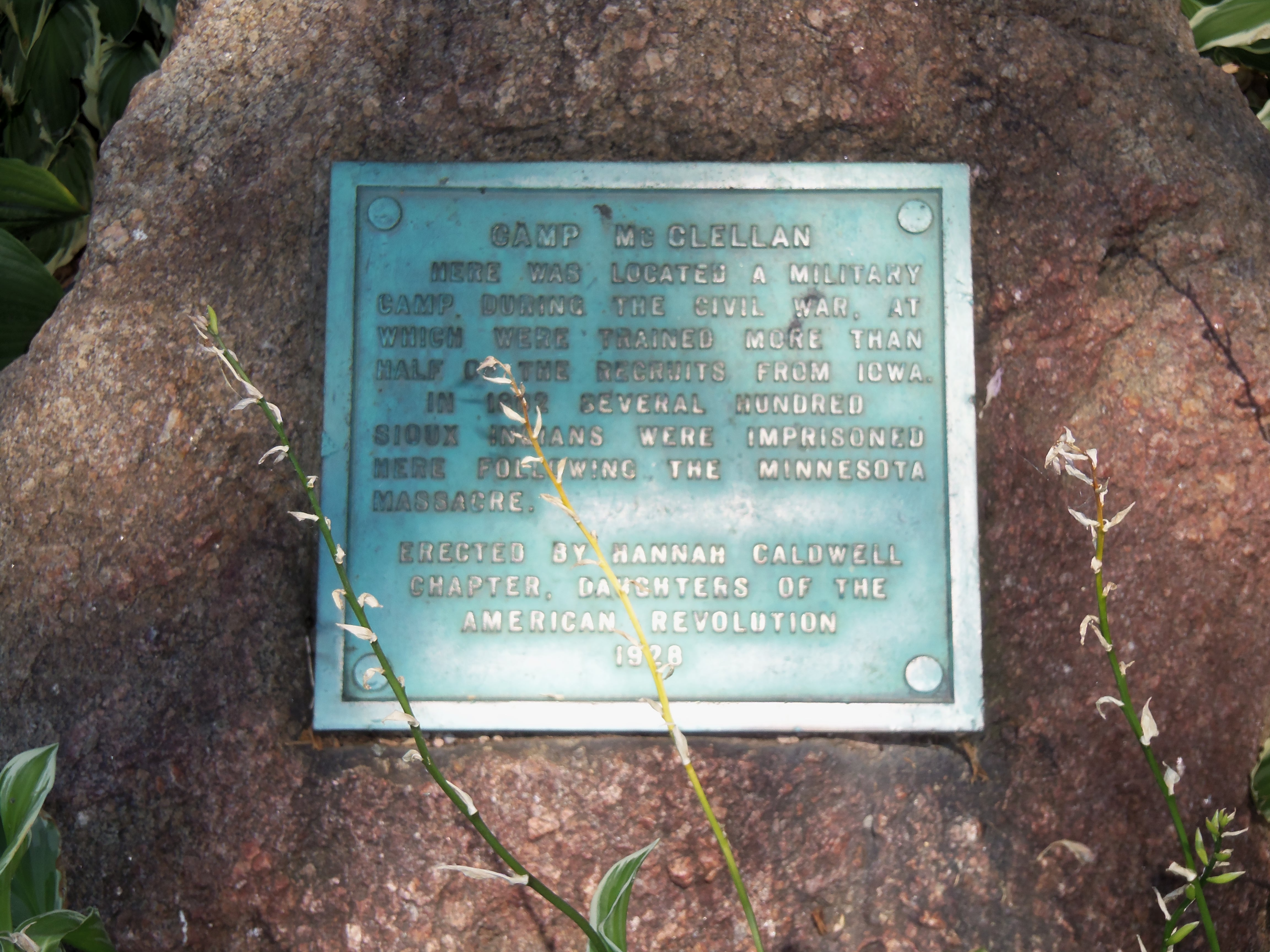
- Camp McClellan Marker

- Location within Iowa Location within the United States
- Location: E. 11th St. Davenport, Iowa
- Coordinates: 41°31′48″N 90°32′42″W
- Area: 31-acre (0.13 km^{2})
- Part of: Village of East Davenport (ID80001459)
- DRHP No.: 24

Significant dates
- Added to NRHP: March 17, 1980
- Designated DRHP: August 5, 1998

Lindsay Park is a 31-acre (0.13 km^{2}) park. located in the Village of East Davenport in Davenport, Iowa, United States. The lower park is a contributing property of the Davenport Village Historic District that has been listed on the National Register of Historic Places since 1980, and the upper park is part of the McClellan Heights Historic District which was listed on the national register in 1984. The whole park was individually listed on the Davenport Register of Historic Properties in 1998. Lindsay Park is owned by the city of Davenport and features a playground, baseball diamonds and views of the Mississippi River, which is immediately to the south of the park. There is a group of architectural sculptures along the Riverfront Parkway, of which Lindsay Park is a part. The park also hosts the annual Riverssance Festival of Fine Art.

== Camp McClellan ==
The park served as the parade grounds for the Union Army stationed at Camp McClellan during the American Civil War. Camp McClellan was laid out in August 1861. It was the largest of the five camps that were in and around the city of Davenport. After the war the area became a residential area, named McClellan Heights, and the southwest portion became Lindsay Park. The park held a Civil War Muster and Mercantile Exposition annually in the 1980s.
