= Indian Springs, California =

Indian Springs
- Former settlement
- Location in California
- Coordinates: 39°10′46″N 121°11′34″W
- Country: United States
- State: California
- County: Nevada County
- Time zone: UTC-8 (Pacific (PST))
  - Summer (DST): UTC-7 (PDT)

Indian Springs is a small set of springs after which a nearby mining settlement was named in the 19th century, in Nevada County, California, located near Rough and Ready. It had a post office from 1858 to 1871, and again from 1892 until 1893. Indian Springs was listed on a map as of 1949.
