= Village of East Davenport =

- Davenport Village
- U.S. National Register of Historic Places
- U.S. Historic district
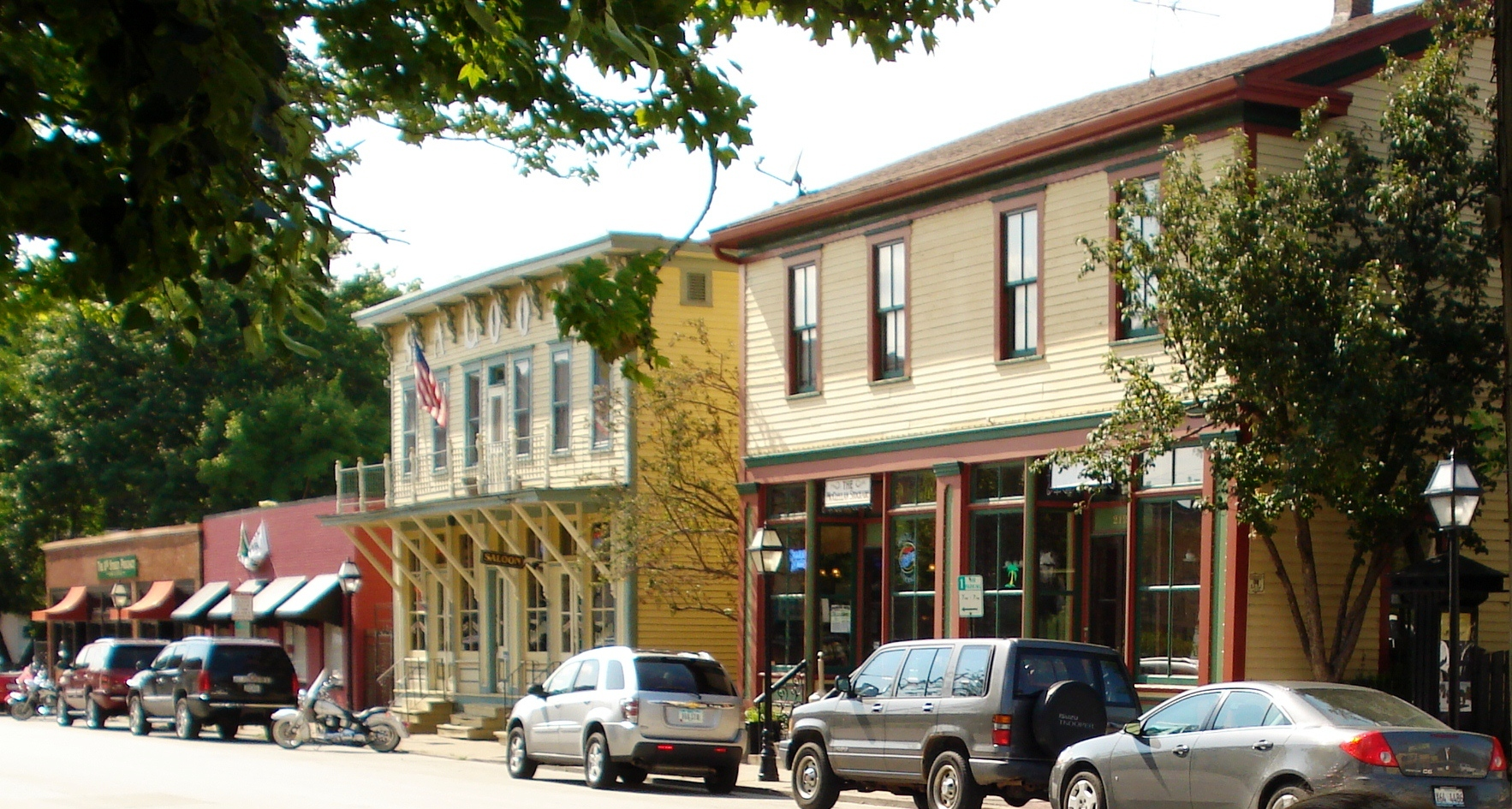
- One of Davenport's oldest neighborhoods, the Village of East Davenport is full of small specialty shops and was used as parade grounds for Civil War soldiers from Camp McClellan

- Location within Iowa Location within the United States
- Location: Roughly bounded by the Mississippi River, Spring, Judson, and 13th Sts., Kirkwood Boulevard, and Jersey Ridge Rd., Davenport, Iowa
- Coordinates: 41°31′48″N 90°32′42″W
- Area: 72 acres (29 ha)
- Architect: Multiple
- NRHP reference No.: 80001459
- Added to NRHP: March 17, 1980

The Village of East Davenport, also known simply as The Village, is located along the Mississippi River on the southeast side of Davenport, Iowa, United States. It was listed as a historic district on the National Register of Historic Places in 1980 as the Davenport Village. At the time of its nomination it included 145 contributing properties, most of which were working-class housing.

It is roughly defined as the area between the Mississippi River, Spring, Judson, and 13th Streets, Kirkwood Boulevard and Jersey Ridge Road. The historic district was started as an independent community and became a part of the city of Davenport within five years. Today it is a shopping and entertainment area.

== History ==
In 1851 William H. Hildreth and Dr. G.W. Witherwax laid out a town they called Upper Davenport, which would later be called East Davenport. The area was a broad ravine along a bend of the Mississippi at the foot of the Rock Island Rapids. The area was known to rivermen as "Stubb's Eddy" for a hermit who lived in a cave in the area whose name was James R. Stubbs. The small town was ten blocks in size. By 1856 it had been incorporated into the city of Davenport.

The first industry in the town was a steam-powered sawmill which was established by Robert Christie in 1851. In the 1860s it became Lindsay & Phelps. In 1854 the Renwick & Sons mill opened. Logs were rafted down the river from the forests in the north and were processed at the mills.

In 1856 the first railroad bridge across the Mississippi River was built just south of The Village. The railroad was important in moving the lumber from the mills to the frontier out west. In 1874 the Davenport and Northwestern Railroad, which became part of the Chicago, Milwaukee and St. Paul Railroad, built a railroad trestle on the west side of The Village that remains today.

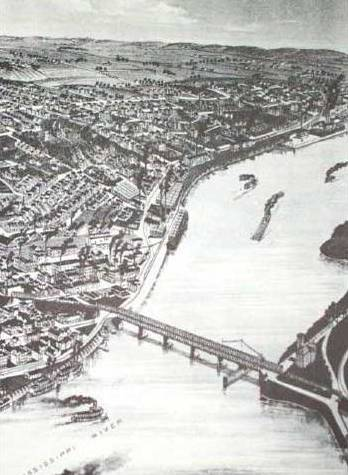
A lithograph showing Davenport in 1888. The Village is in the upper center part of the picture.

Davenport became the home to five army camps during the Civil War. Camp McClellan, the largest of the camps, was established in 1861. As the war escalated the camp served as a hospital. It was also the location of a prison for 300 members of a Sioux tribe who were involved in raids in Minnesota. They were released when President Abraham Lincoln commuted their sentences and sent them to reservations in the West.

On July 24, 1901, one of the worst fires in Davenport history occurred in The Village. A shanty town had grown up around the Weyerhaeuser Mill, Lindsay & Phelps Mill, the Roberts wood yard, and the Standard Oil storage tanks. The area was a square mile of shingles, kindling, sawdust, and 60-foot (18 m) high piles of lumber. The fire began at the Rock Island Fuel Company and spread quickly. The fire was so hot it warped the rails of the railroad bed and buckled the pavement, and the smoke was so thick it made the area as dark as midnight. Flames leapt 300 feet (91 m) into the air and the intense heat created an updraft that sucked lumber into it and sent them into the air and helped spread the fire. The fire moved toward the downtown area, but stopped at the Tremont Avenue hill where St. Katherine's Hall, an Episcopal girls' school, was located. In the end, 20 acres of land were burned, 250 people were left homeless and businesses suffered $1.25 million in losses.

The Village was also the scene for a raid at the East Davenport Turner's Hall during Prohibition in 1928. A Federal Prohibition officer and Davenport Police Officers seized 4,185 bottles of homebrew, 90 gallons of mash, 15 crocks, 50 cans of malt, beer cases, capers, and other materials for making beer.

Today the Village of East Davenport contains many of its original Civil War era buildings that house specialty shops, restaurants, taverns and other businesses. The building stock largely dates from 1848 to 1910. The former Turner's Hall now serves as a theater. The former Hose Station No. 4 on 11th Street has been converted into the International Fire Museum. It was listed on the Davenport Register of Historic Properties in 1993. The Village was placed on the National Register of Historic Places on March 17, 1980. The former Pierce School is individually listed on the NRHP. Lindsay Park was listed on the Davenport Register of Historic Places in 1998 and Indian Springs Park in 2005.

== Gallery ==
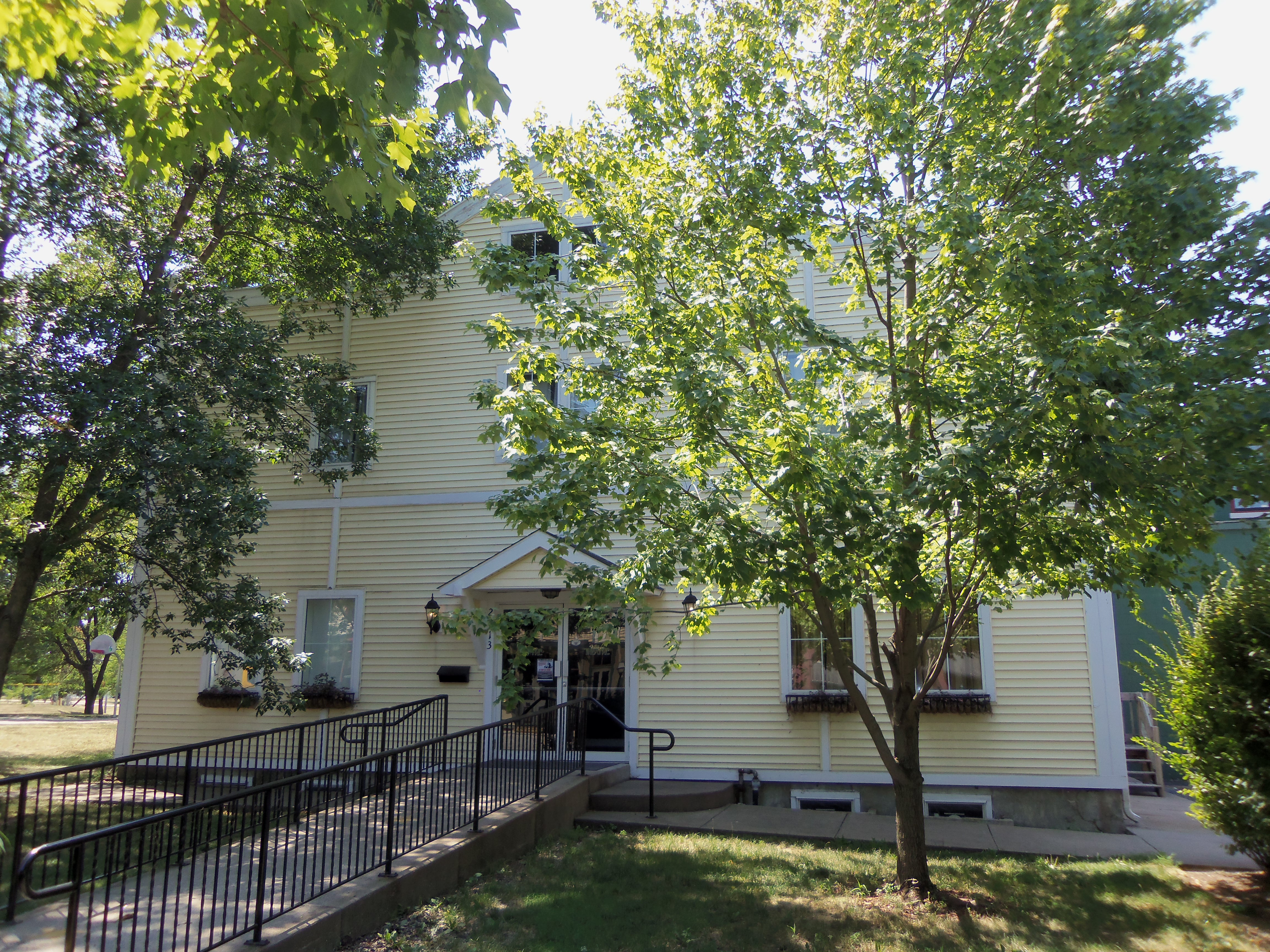
East Turner Hall

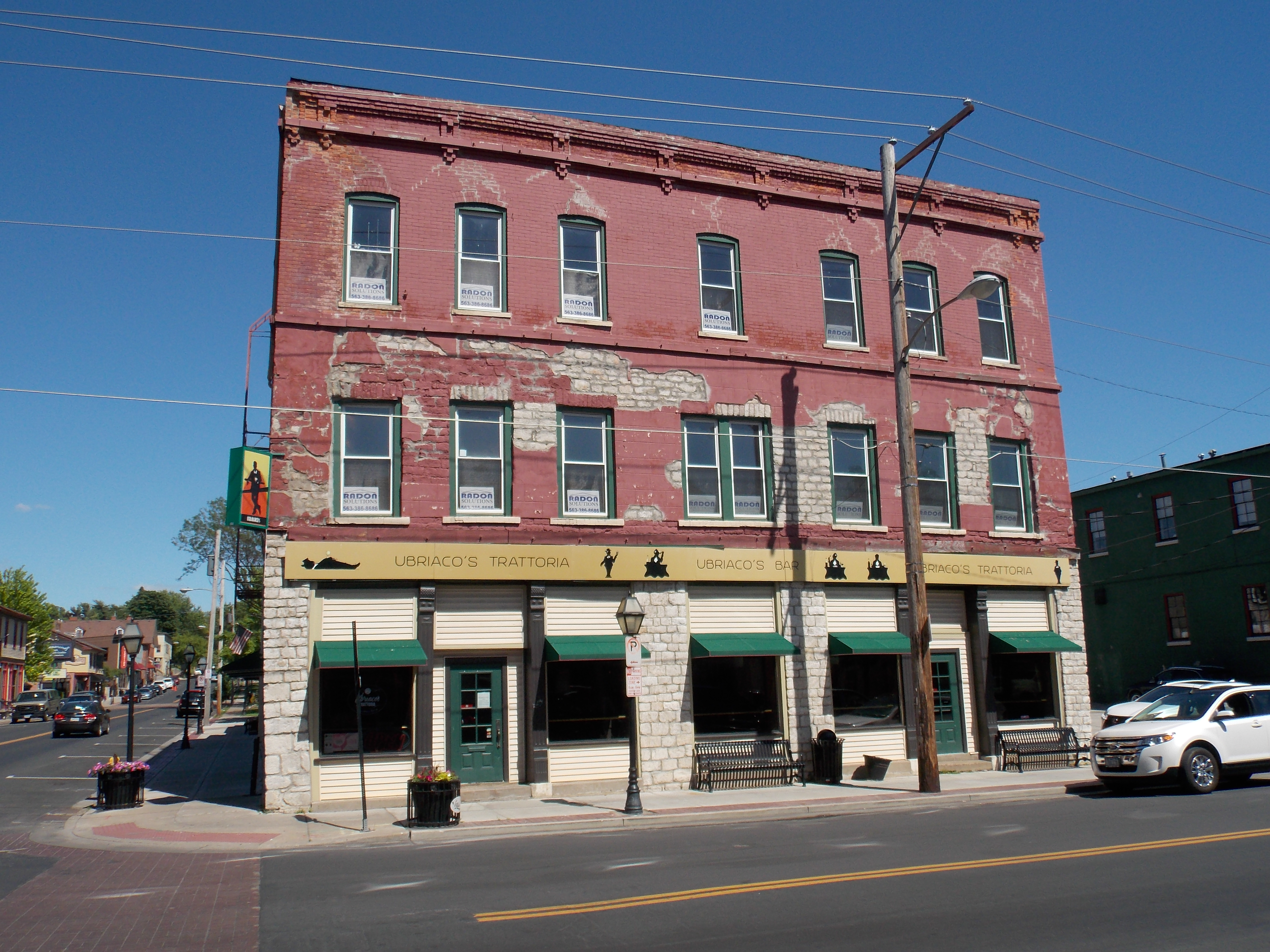
Former Kuehl Hotel

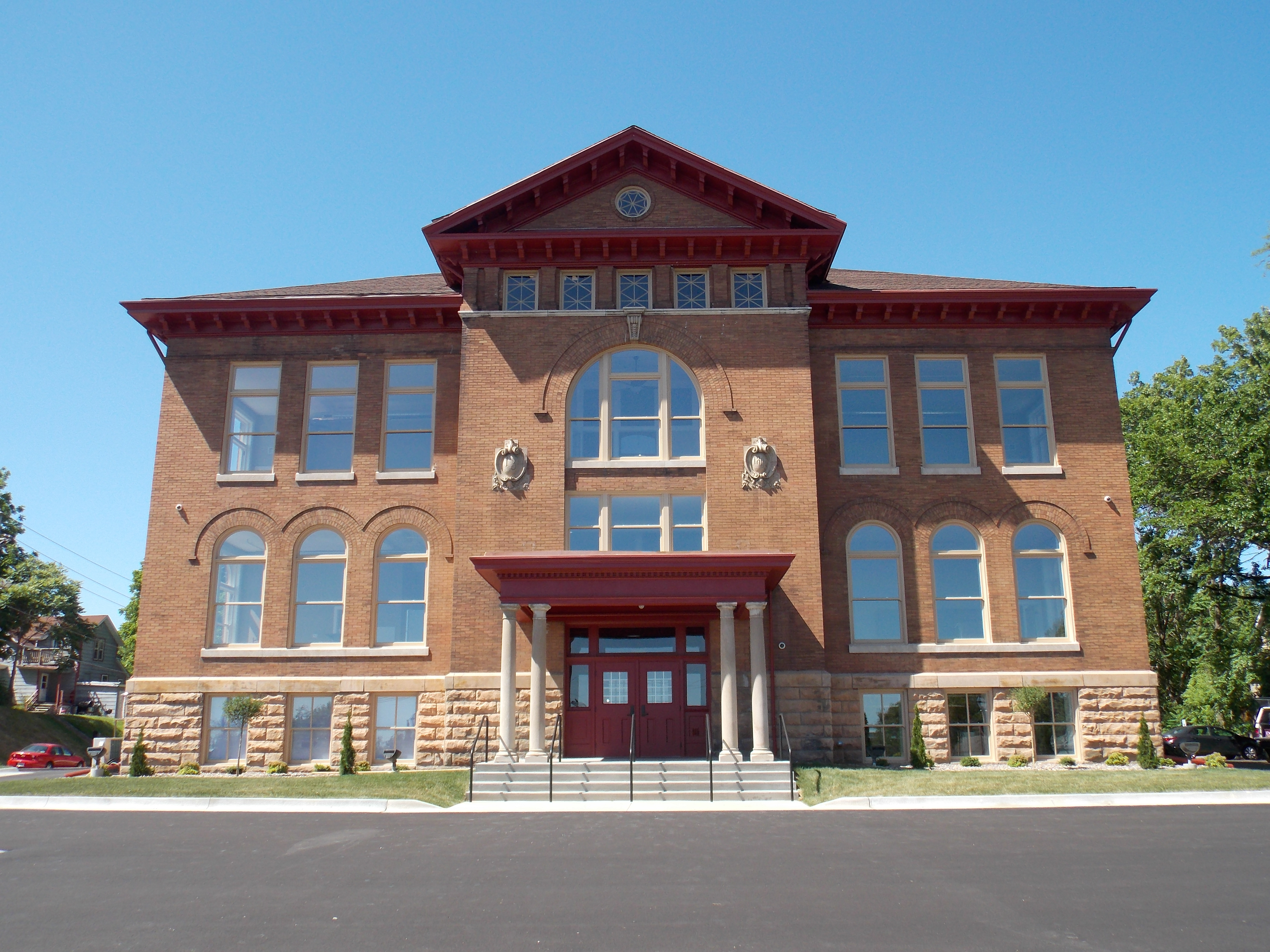
Former Pierce School

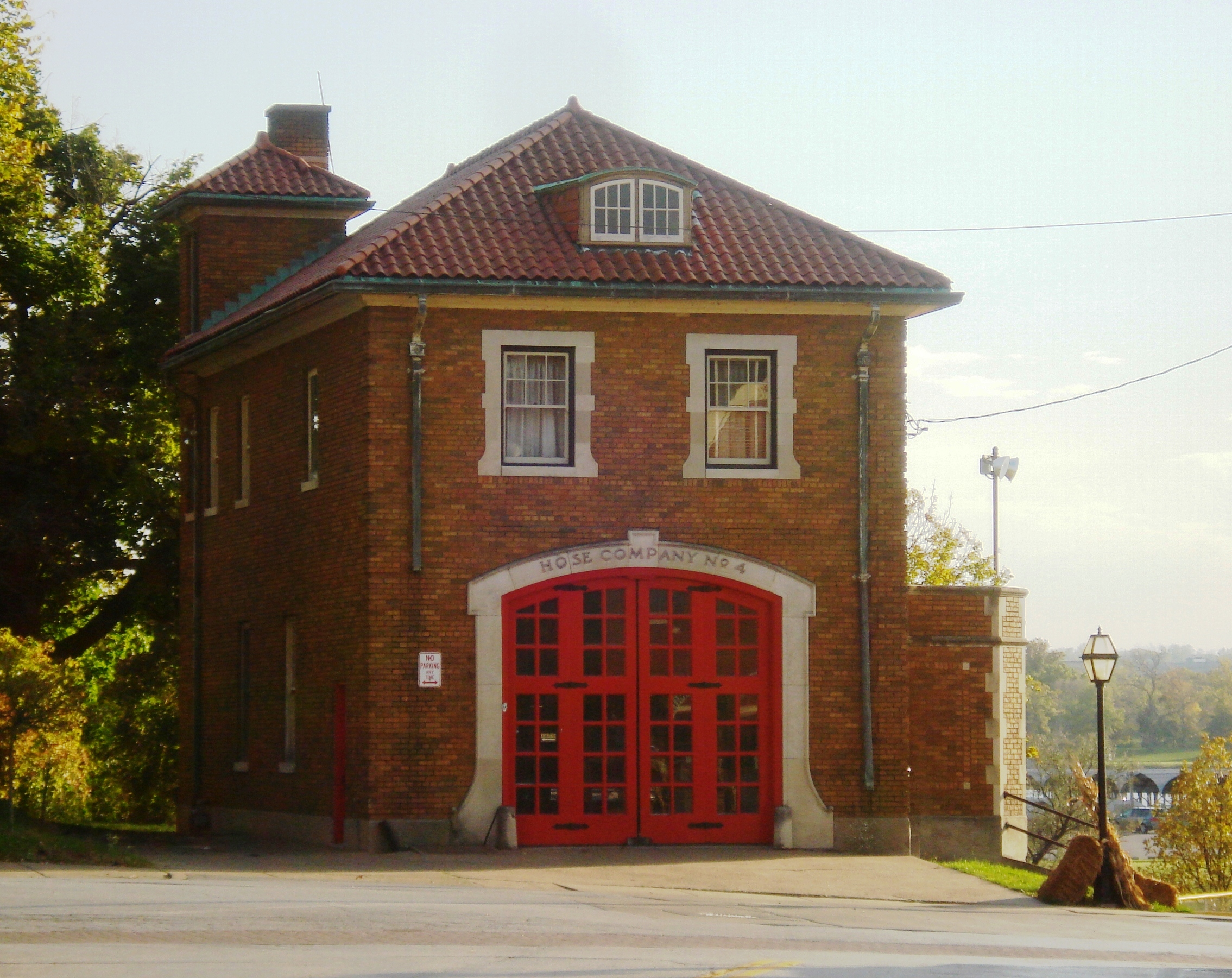
Hose Station No. 4

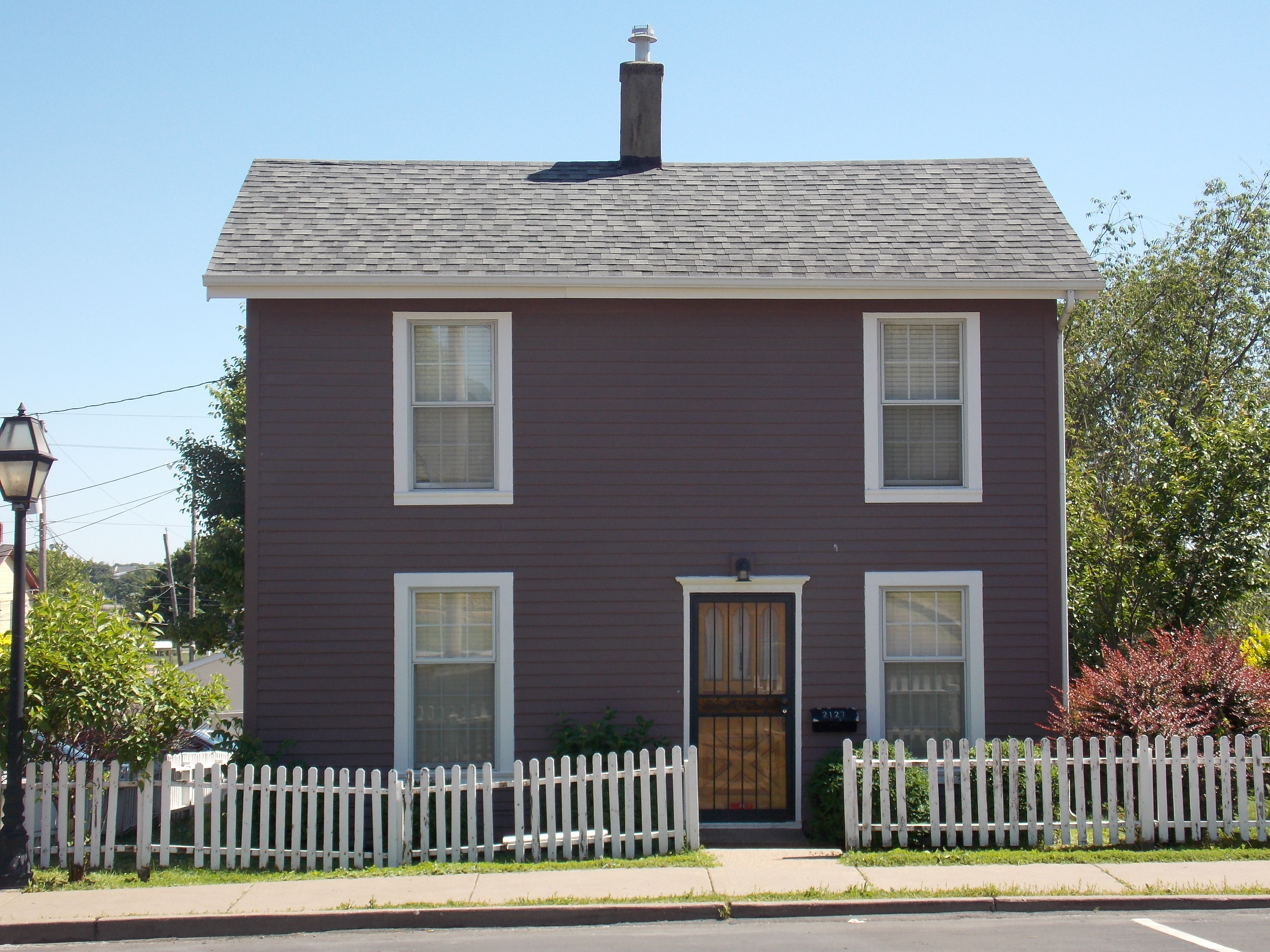
House on E. 12th Street

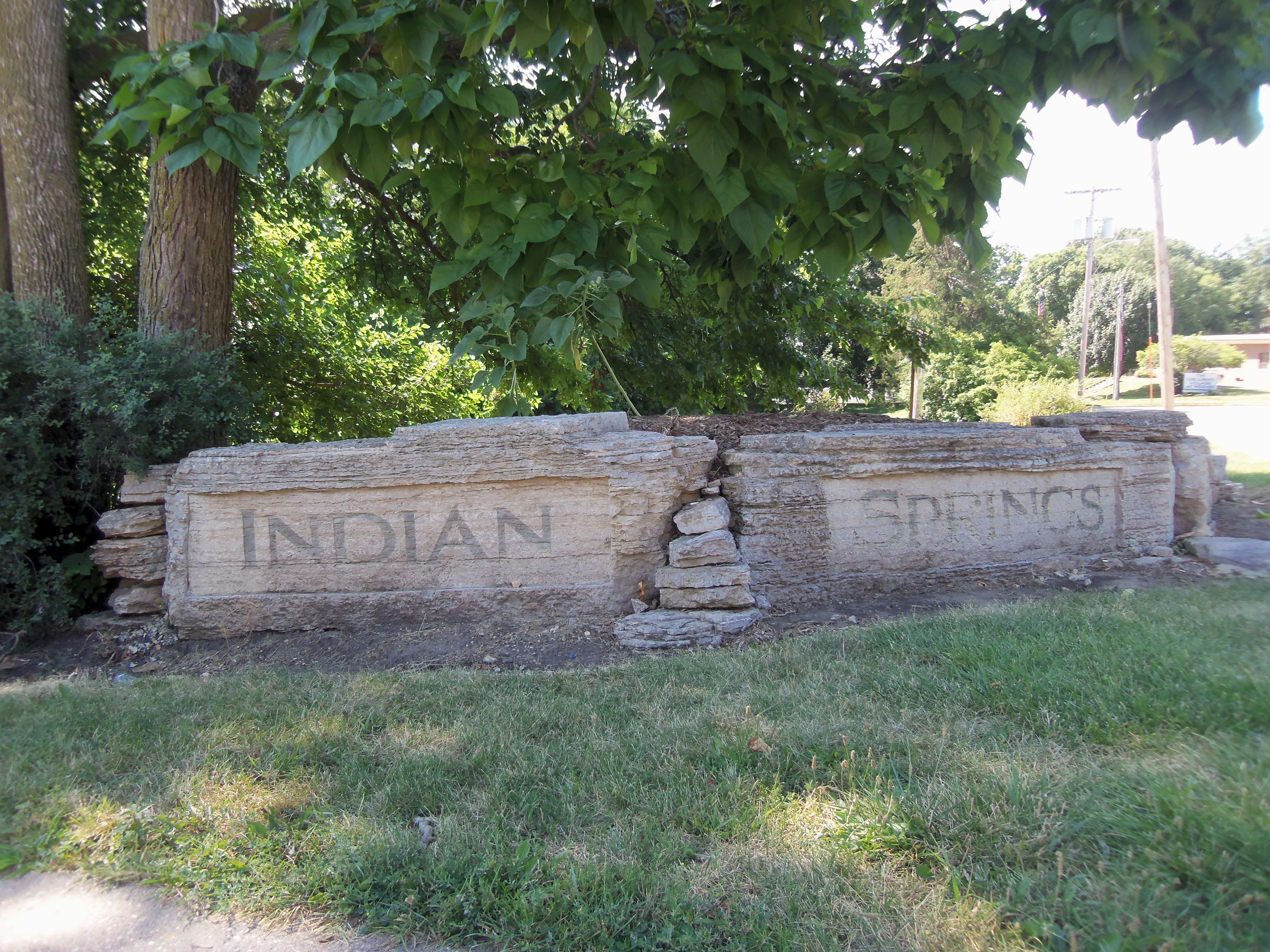
Indian Springs Park

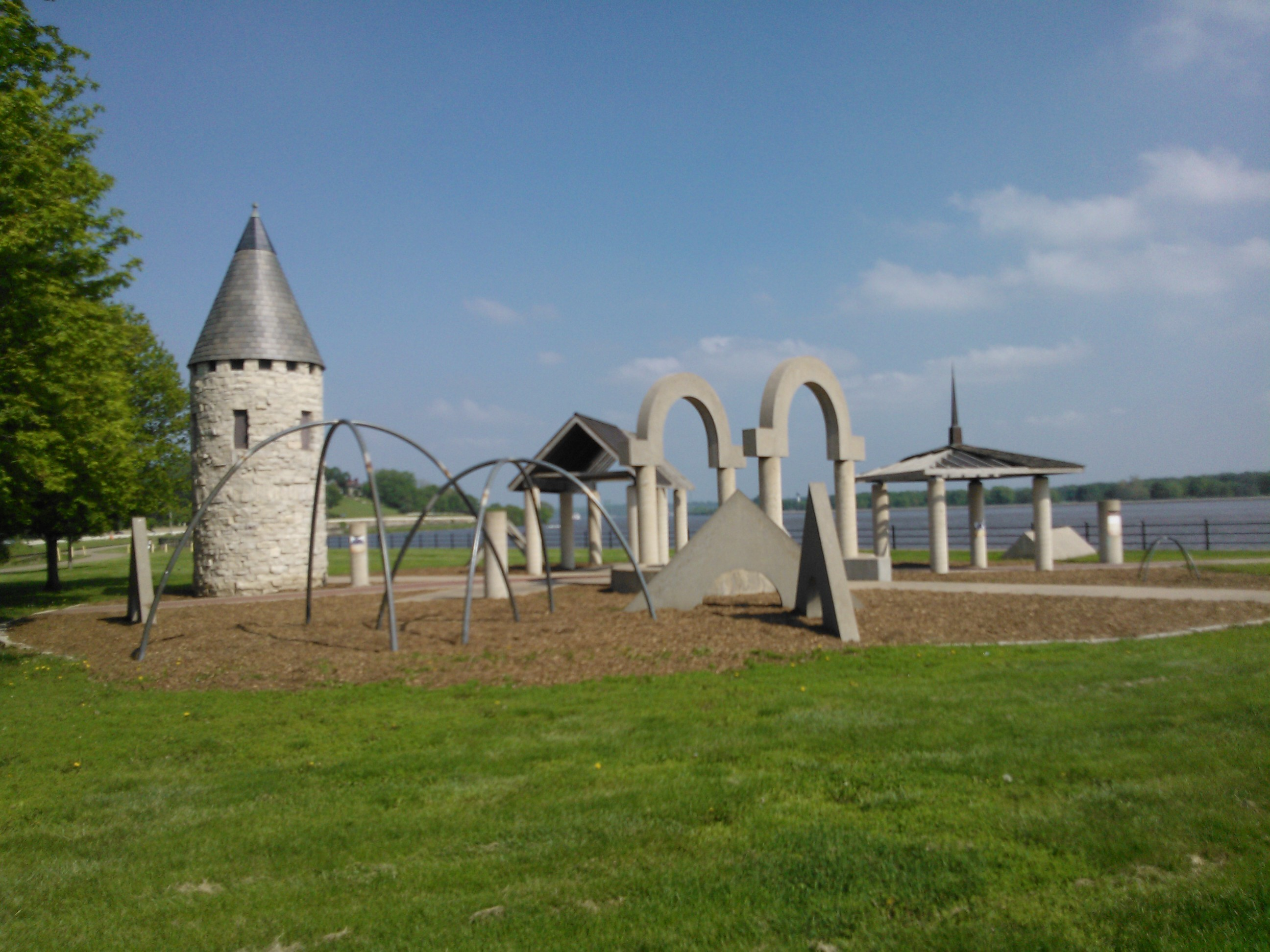
Lindsay Park

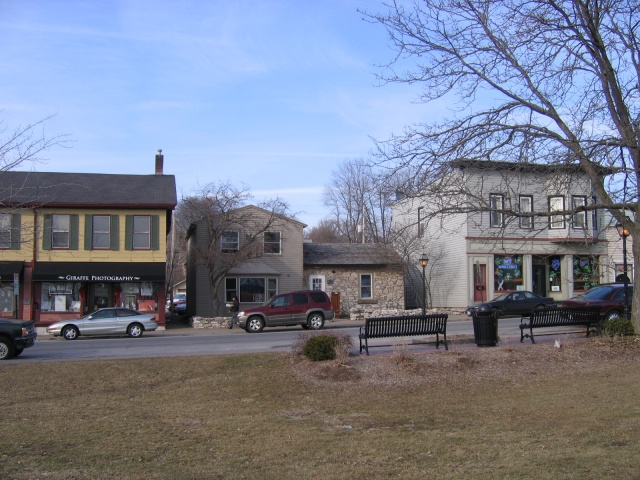
Shops along East 11th Street

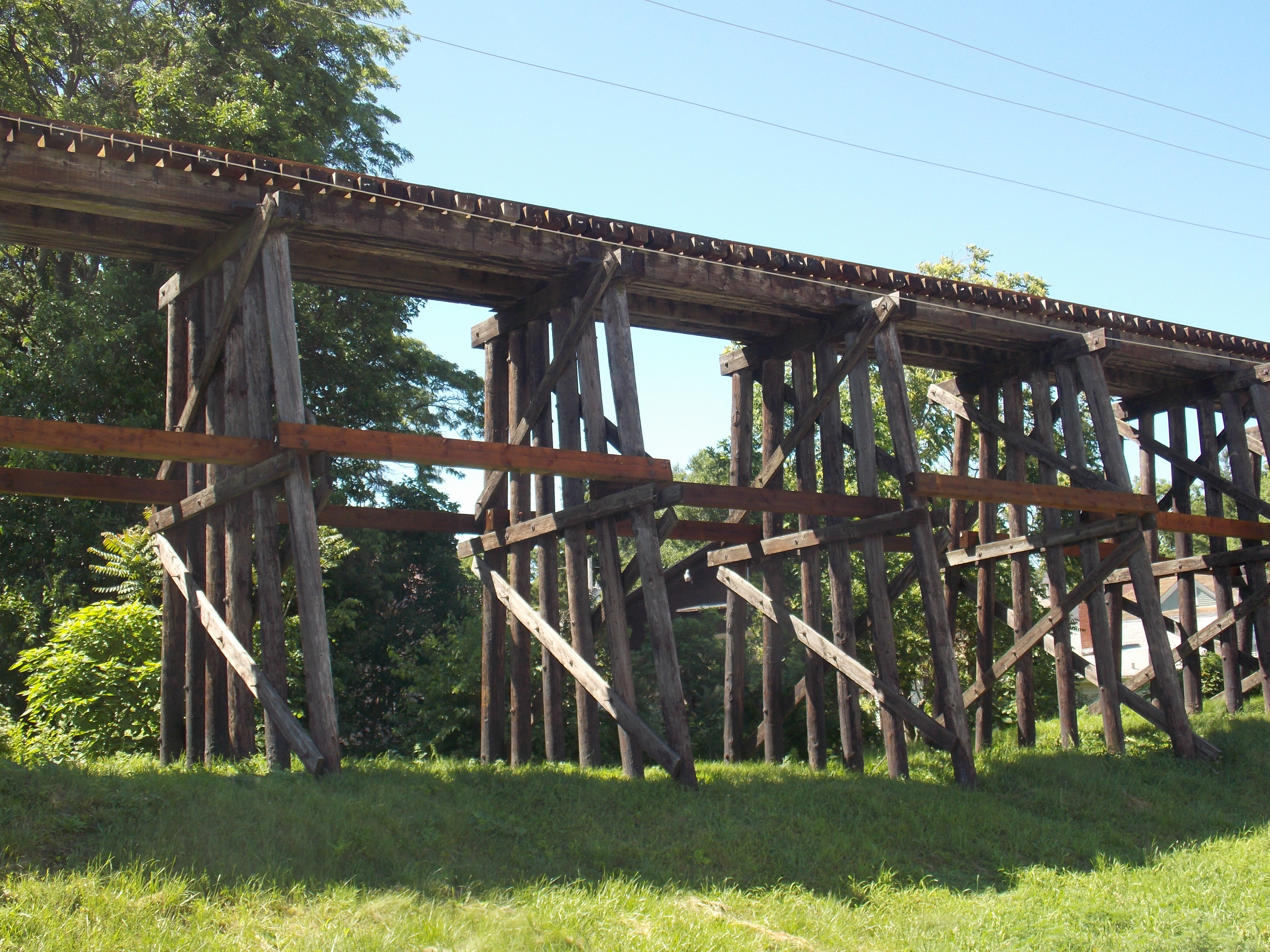
Railroad Bridge

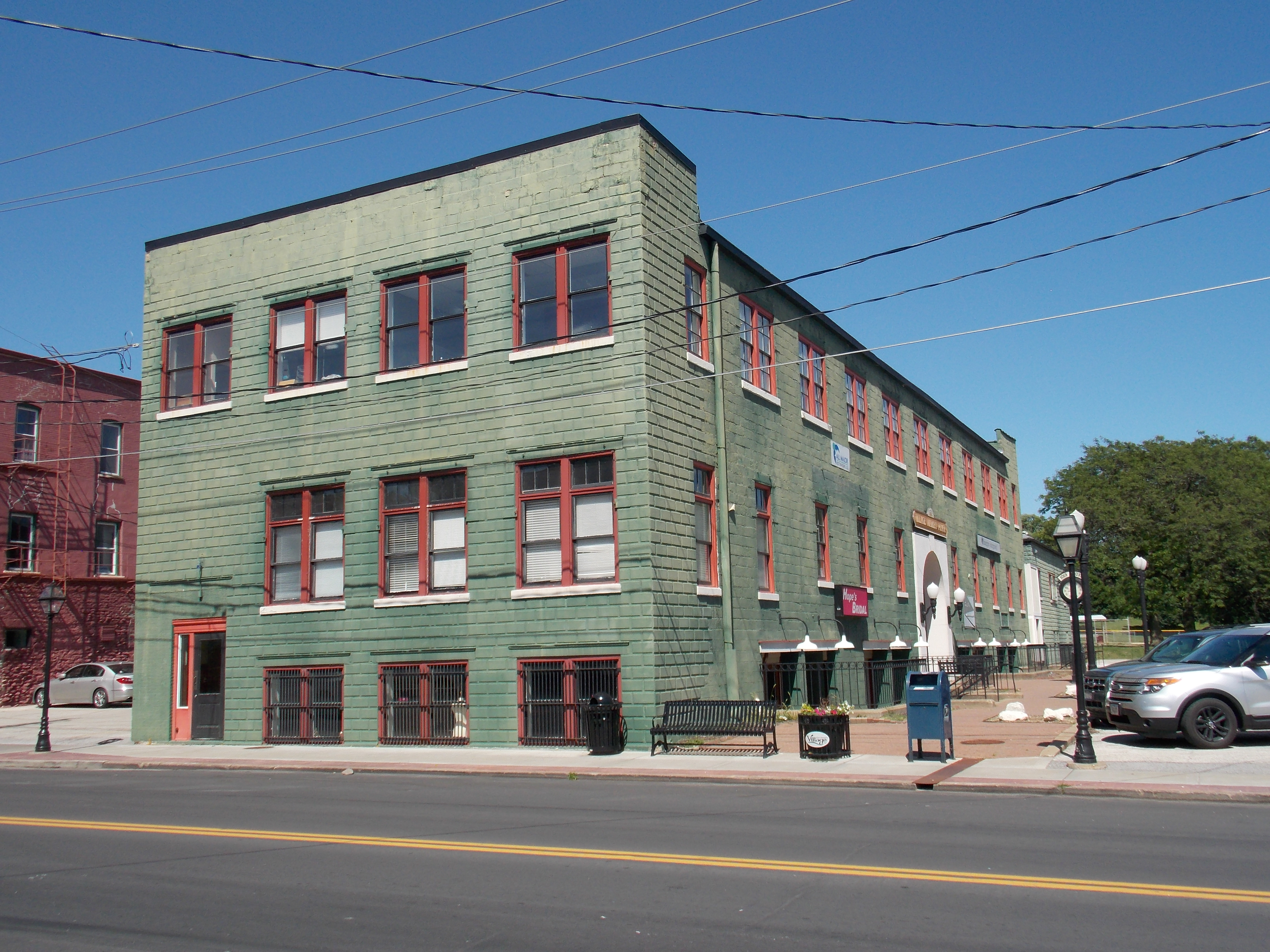
Village Market Place
