= Veterans Memorial Park (Davenport, Iowa) =

Park in Davenport, Iowa, United States

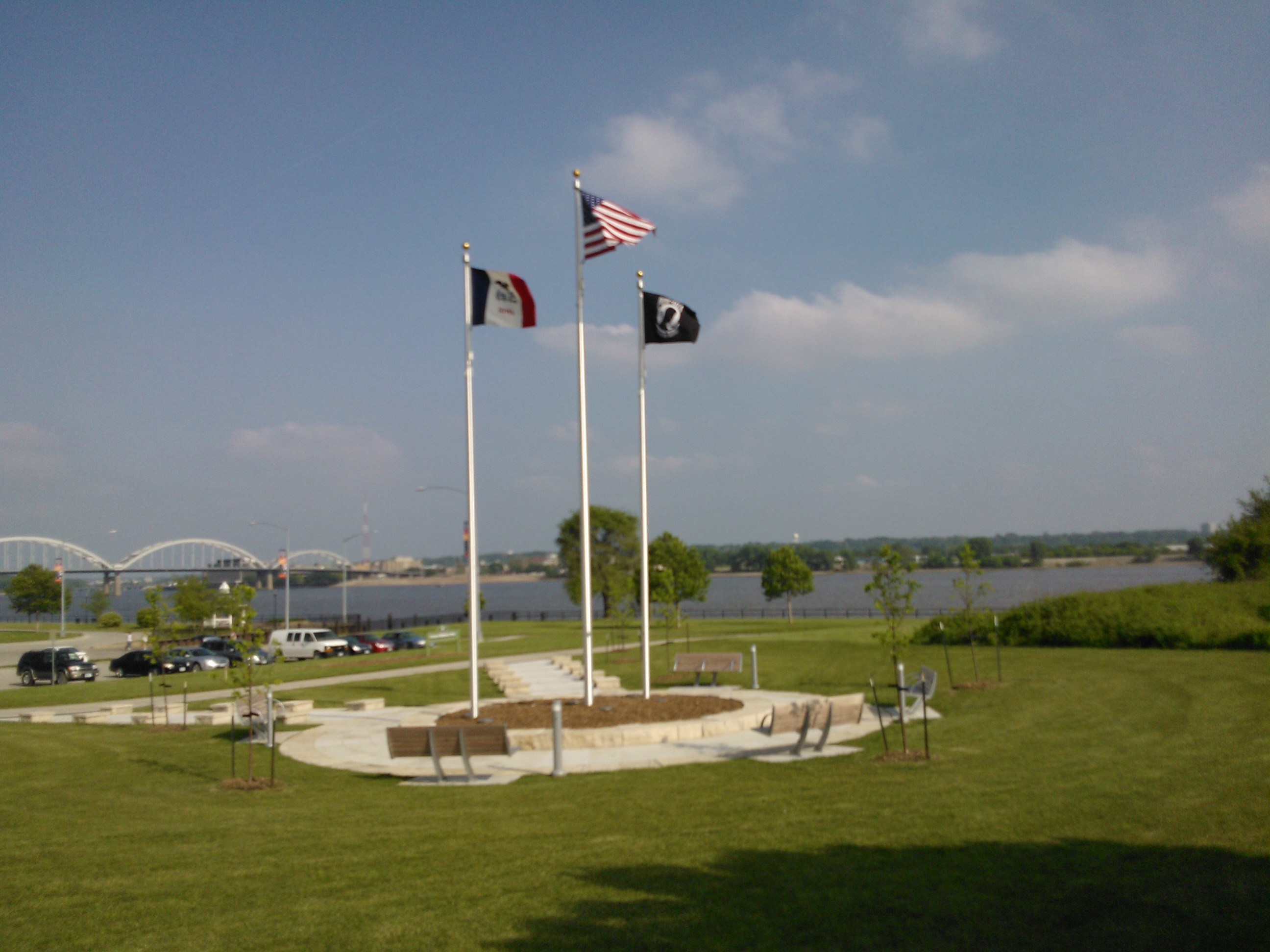
- Interactive map of Veterans Memorial Park
- Type: Public park
- Location: 315 S. Marquette St. Davenport, Iowa
- Coordinates: 41°30′59″N 90°35′39″W
- Created: 2011
- Operator: Davenport Parks and Recreation
- Open: Year round
- Public transit: Davenport CitiBus

Veterans Memorial Park is one of four parks located along the Mississippi River in downtown Davenport, Iowa, United States. The other three are Centennial Park, which is immediately to the east of Veterans Park, LeClaire Park and River Heritage Park, which is being developed on the far east side of downtown on land that had been used for industrial purposes. The Riverfront Parkway passes through the south side of the park.

== History ==
The Davenport City Council narrowly rejected a proposal in October 2010 to name the new park on the east side of downtown as a veterans memorial. Instead they established a task force to find a park location for the memorial. They chose Crescent Park, which was an undeveloped area along the Mississippi River near the Crescent Rail Bridge. The council gave its approval in January 2011. An entrance area to the park with three flagpoles was dedicated on Memorial Day in 2011. Other proposed elements to the park include a 50 feet (15 m) high promontory berm, an observation spire or another type of large memorial and an amphitheater. The other elements will be phased in over a period of years. Phase Two of the parks' development was begun in May 2022. It will create the berm or overlook along the river.
