= Duck Creek Park =

Duck Creek Park, or variants thereof, can refer to:

- Duck Creek Park and Golf Course, Davenport, Iowa
- Duck Creek Parkway, Bettendorf and Davenport, Iowa
