= LeClaire Park =

Park in Iowa, United States

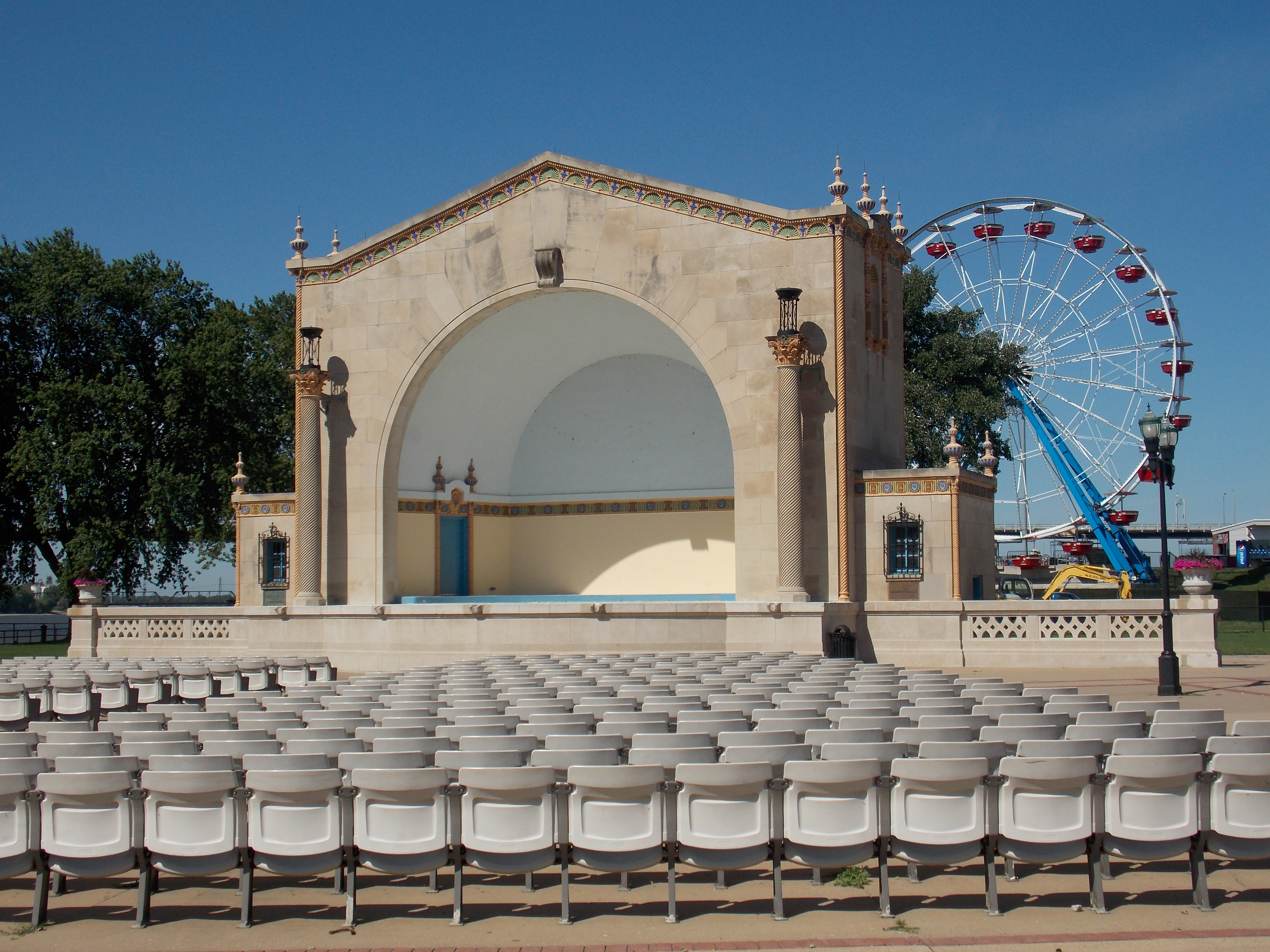
- W.D. Petersen Memorial Music Pavilion
- Interactive map of LeClaire Park
- Type: Public park
- Location: Davenport, Iowa
- Coordinates: 41°31′7″N 90°34′37″W
- Area: 400-acre (1.6 km^{2})
- Created: c. 1890
- Operator: Davenport Parks and Recreation
- Open: Year round
- Public transit: Davenport CitiBus

LeClaire Park is a public park located along the Mississippi River in downtown Davenport, Iowa, United States. It is situated between two other riverfront parks: Centennial Park on the west and River Heritage Park, a new park that is being developed to the east. The 400-acre (1.6 km^{2}) park includes monuments, a bandshell, a baseball stadium and it is one of the terminal points for the Davenport Skybridge. The Riverfront Parkway pass through the park. Other features of the park include picnic shelters, horseshoe pits and river access for fishing. Previously the first riverboat casino on the Mississippi river was moored off the park’s levee.

== History ==
LeClaire Park was established on the riverfront during the mayoral administration of C.A. Ficke in the early 1890s. In 1911 the Levee Improvement Commission was created. It was responsible for developing the city’s riverfront for recreational, industrial and transportation purposes. It was also to beautify the area. The seawall was extended over a period of years from 1912–1931. LeClaire Park was dramatically improved by the commission from 1912–1914. The John Dillon Memorial was added in 1918, the Municipal Natatorium was built in 1923, the W.D. Petersen Music Pavilion was added the following year, the Municipal Inn in 1929 and Municipal Stadium opened in 1931. Privately funded additions included the Lend-A-Hand Club building in 1923, the Chicago, Milwaukee, St. Paul and Pacific Freight House in 1918 and Union Station in 1924. The President Casino was one of the boats that initiated riverboat gambling in Iowa in the early 1990s. The Lend-A-Hand building and the natatorium have subsequently been torn down.

== John Dillon Memorial ==
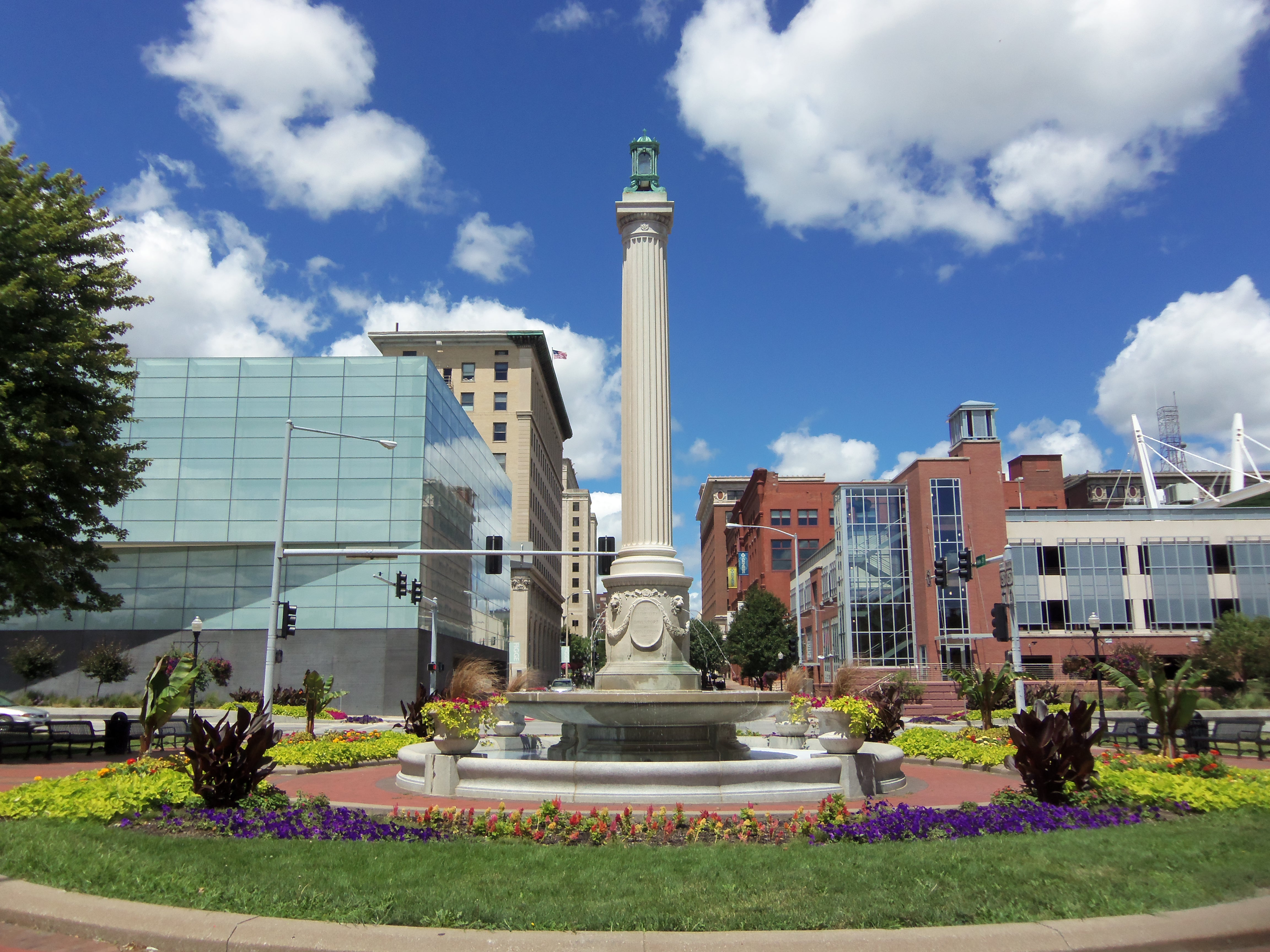
Dillon Memorial

The memorial to Judge John Forrest Dillon was paid for through a bequest. The fountain was originally built in the middle of Main Street and the Lend-A-Hand Club and the natatorium were built on the east and west sides of the street respectively. In 1997 after the other buildings were torn down Main Street was closed south of River Drive and a plaza was created.

== W.D. Petersen Music Pavilion ==
Popularly referred to as the LeClaire Park Bandshell, the pavilion was named for William D. Petersen, a promoter of Davenport’s riverfront in the late 19th and early 20th century. It annually hosts concerts such as the Mississippi Valley Blues Festival, Bix Beiderbecke Memorial Jazz Festival, Festival of Praise as well as other public events.

== Municipal Inn ==
The concession stand was the work of the Davenport architectural firm of Clausen, Kruse & Klein. It opened in 1929 and is used to mark the major floods on the Mississippi. The flood of 1993 nearly reached the buildings eaves. The structure was listed on the Davenport Register of Historic Properties.

== Modern Woodmen Park ==
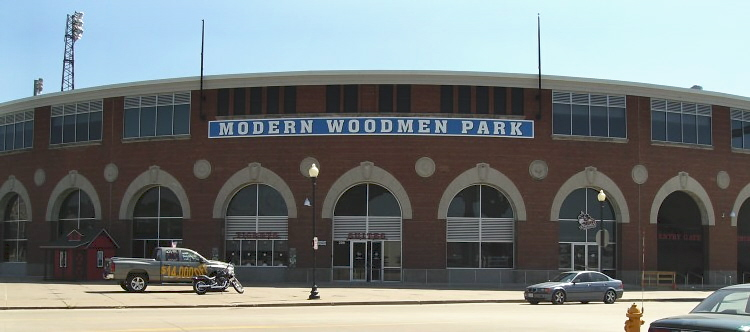
Modern Woodmen Park

The stadium opened as Municipal Stadium on May 26, 1931. It is situated between LeClaire Park on the east and Centennial Park on the west. The name of the stadium was changed to John O’Donnell Stadium, after a local sportswriter, in 1971, and to Modern Woodmen Park after the fraternal insurance company of the same name bought the naming rights in 2007. It has been the home for Davenport based minor league baseball teams, including the Davenport Blue Sox and the teams the area has fielded as a member of the Midwest League. The current team to occupy the stadium is the Quad City River Bandits. It was also the home field for the St. Ambrose University and Assumption High School athletic programs. Concerts and other sporting events have also been held in the stadium.
