= Centennial Park (Davenport, Iowa) =

City park in Davenport, Iowa, USA

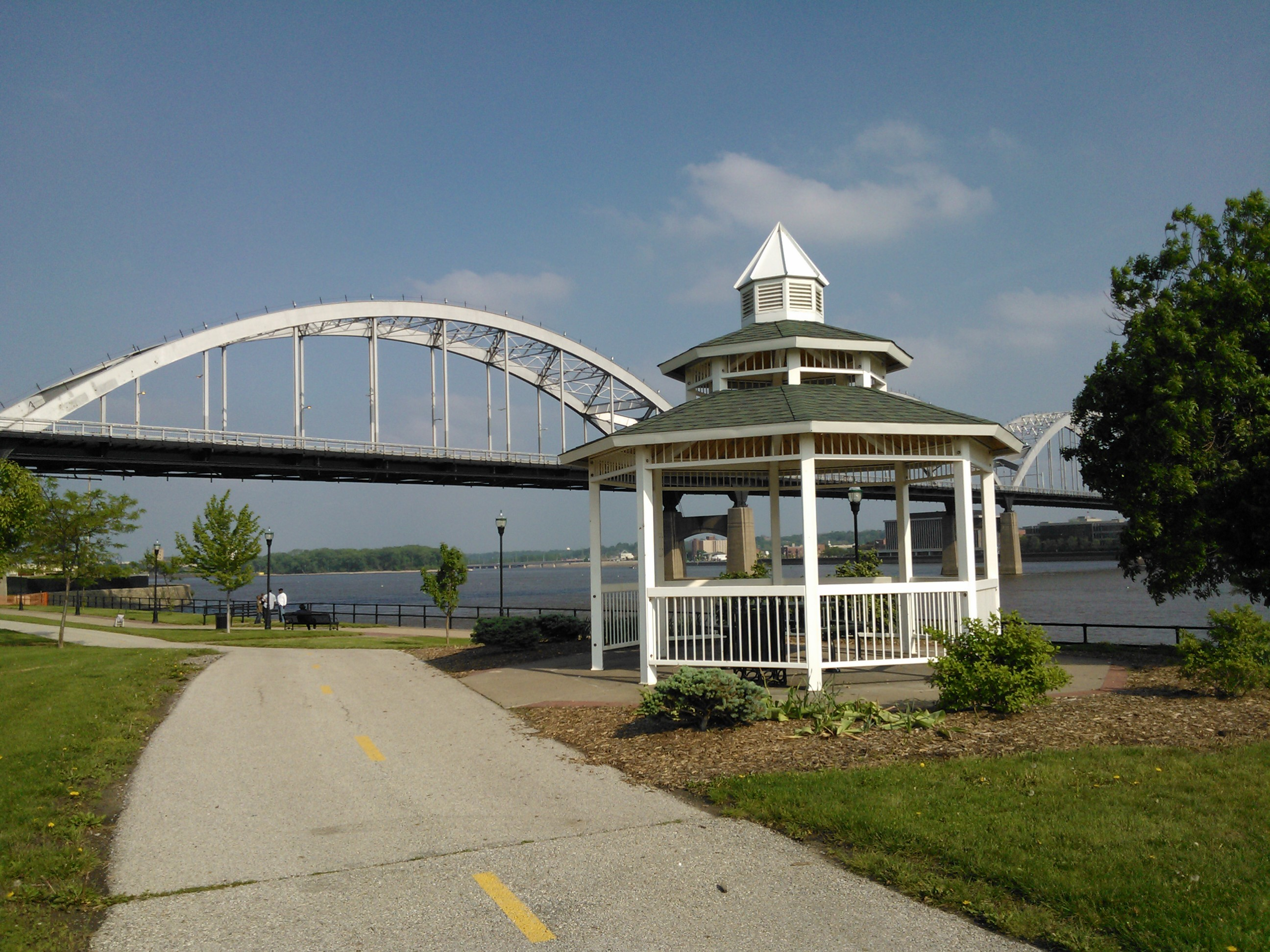
- Interactive map of Centennial Park
- Type: Public park
- Location: Davenport, Iowa
- Coordinates: 41°31′10″N 90°35′18″W
- Created: 2004
- Operator: Davenport Parks and Recreation
- Open: Year round
- Public transit: Davenport CitiBus

Centennial Park is one of four parks located along the Mississippi River in downtown Davenport, Iowa, United States. The other three are LeClaire Park, which is immediately to the east of Centennial Park, Veterans Memorial Park, which is being developed immediately to the west, and River Heritage Park that is under development on the far east side of downtown. Development of the 250-acre (1.0 km^{2}) park was begun in 2000. Its name is derived from the Rock Island Centennial Bridge, which is on the east side of the park. Centennial Park features a boat ramp, a playground, a gazebo, fishing areas, a dog off leash area, basketball courts, a sprayground, and a skateboard park. The skate board park is used for skateboarding, roller blades and BMX bikes. The Riverfront Parkway passes through the park, and the River's Edge, an indoor sports complex operated by Davenport Parks and Recreation, is on the northeast corner of the park.

== History ==
The site where Centennial Park now sits is a former landfill used by the city of Davenport until 1975. The north part of the property was the location of a rail yard and the southern portion was used as a festival ground in the late 20th century, with a few commercial buildings on the west side of the property. The park's construction was a part of a $100 million project called River Vision that was passed by the city council in 2004. The 33,000-square-foot (3,100 m^{2}) skate board park was the first element of the park that opened in 2006. It was designed by SITE Design Group Inc., of Tempe, Arizona. The basketball courts, concession stand and stage were opened in 2009. The last three commercial buildings on the site were torn down the same year to make way for the spray park that was constructed in 2010. In late 2010 and early 2011 part of what was the festival grounds was paved for parking and the rest is being seeded for an open green space.
