= Riverfront Parkway =

Park in Davenport and Bettendorf, Iowa

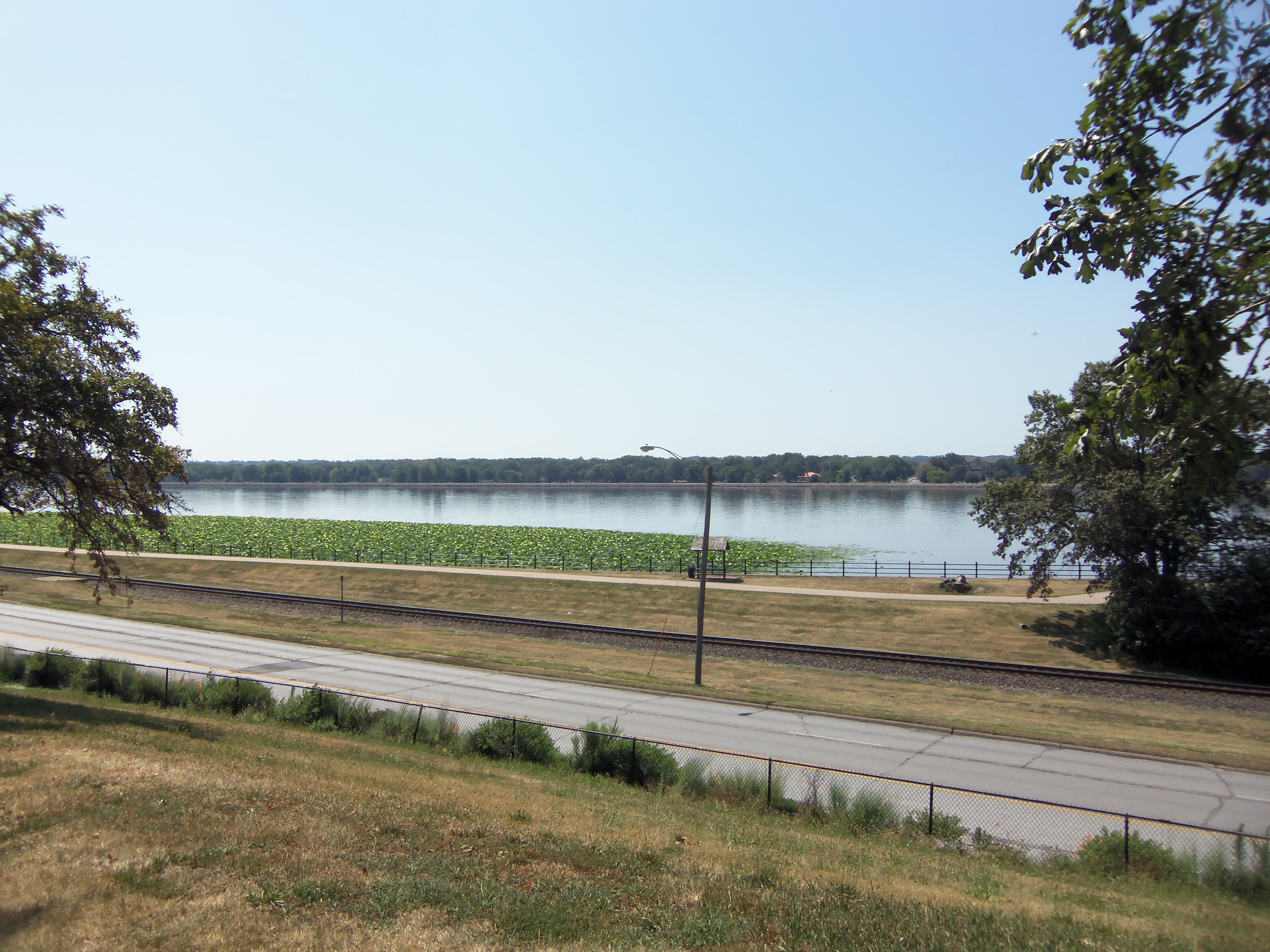
- A portion of the parkway as seen from upper Lindsay Park.
- Interactive map of Riverfront Parkway
- Type: Public park
- Location: Bettendorf, Iowa; Davenport, Iowa
- Coordinates: 41°31′10″N 90°34′10″W
- Area: 11 miles (18 km)
- Operator: Bettendorf Parks and Recreation; Davenport Parks and Recreation
- Open: Year round
- Public transit: Davenport CitiBus

Riverfront Parkway is located along the Mississippi River in the cities of Davenport and Bettendorf in the U.S. state of Iowa. The parkway is a bike and walking trail that extends for 11 miles (18 km) starting at Credit Island on the west passing through Davenport for 7.6 miles (12.2 km) before entering Bettendorf. It continues for another 3.4 miles (5.5 km) at its terminus on the east side of Bettendorf. On Credit Island the bike path circles the park for 2.62 miles (4.22 km). On its way east from Credit Island it passes through Veterans Memorial Park, which is being developed, Centennial Park, LeClaire Park, River Heritage Park that is being developed on the east side of downtown Davenport, and Lindsay Park. In Bettendorf it passes through Leach Park. There are plans to connect the park to the Duck Creek Parkway and Sunderbruch Park in the future. There are public art installations along the parkway at Credit Island, Lindsay Park and Leach Park.
