= Bettendorf Transit =

Public transportation operator

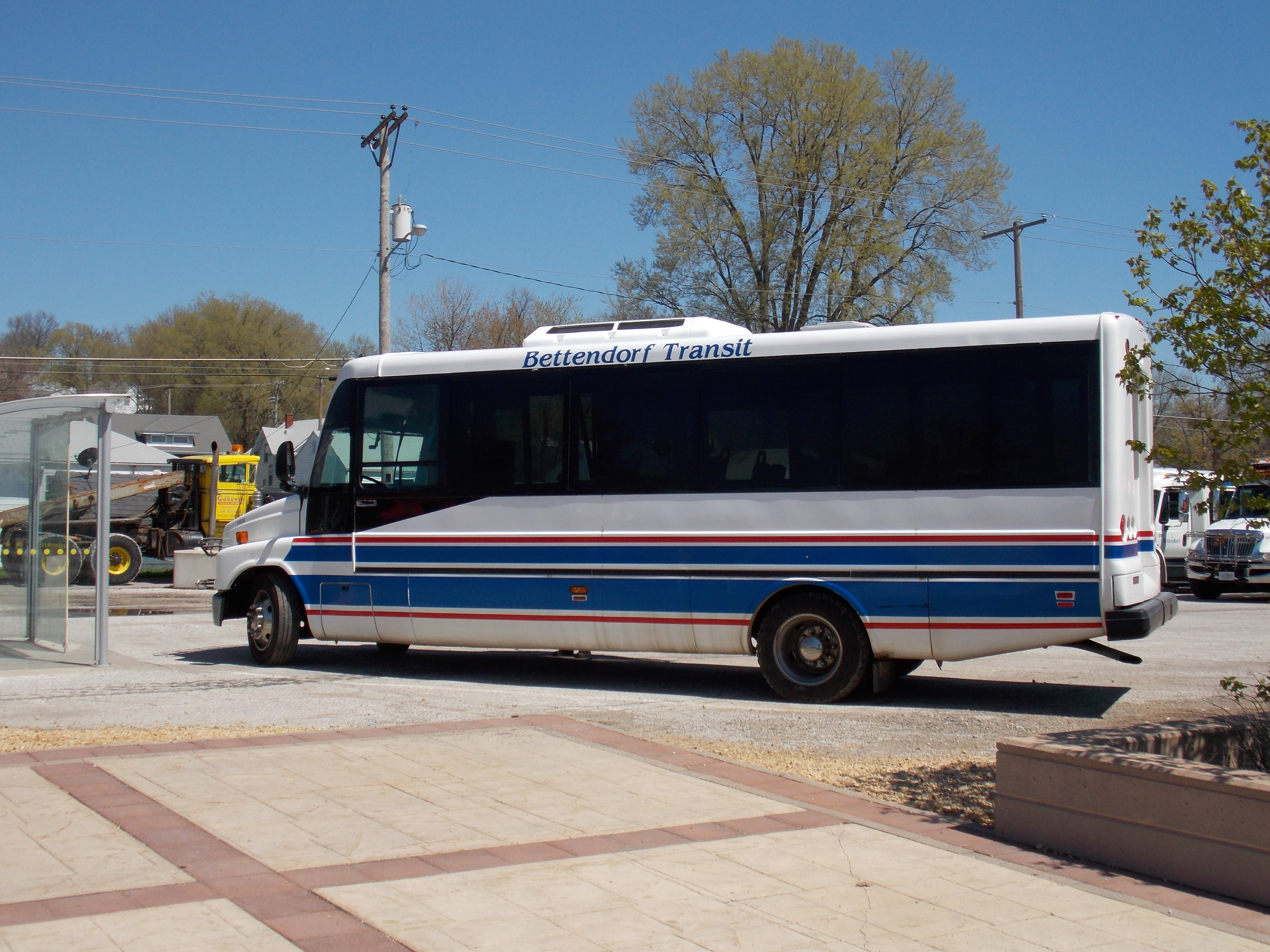
- A Bettendorf Transit bus.
- Founded: 1980
- Headquarters: 4403 Devils Glen Rd
- Locale: Bettendorf, Iowa
- Service area: Scott County, Iowa
- Service type: bus service
- Routes: 3
- Fleet: 5
- Website: Bettendorf Transit

Bettendorf Transit is the operator of public transportation in Scott County, Iowa. Bus service began in the city in 1974, with the municipality contracted with Moline for the creation of one intercity line. In 1980, fixed route service began, and today four local and one intercity routes are provided, using 6 standard and two smaller buses. Standard fares are 60 cents; while all buses are wheelchair accessible, paratransit is not a function of this agency, but instead is a function of River Bend Transit.

== Route list ==
- 1 Red Bridge Line to Moline-Burlington Coat Factory-Scott Community College
- 2 Blue Burlington Coat Factory Devils Glen Rd.
- 3 Purple Northridge Shopping Center

== See also ==
- Davenport Citibus
- Quad Cities MetroLINK
- List of bus transit systems in the United States
