= Duck Creek (Quad Cities) =

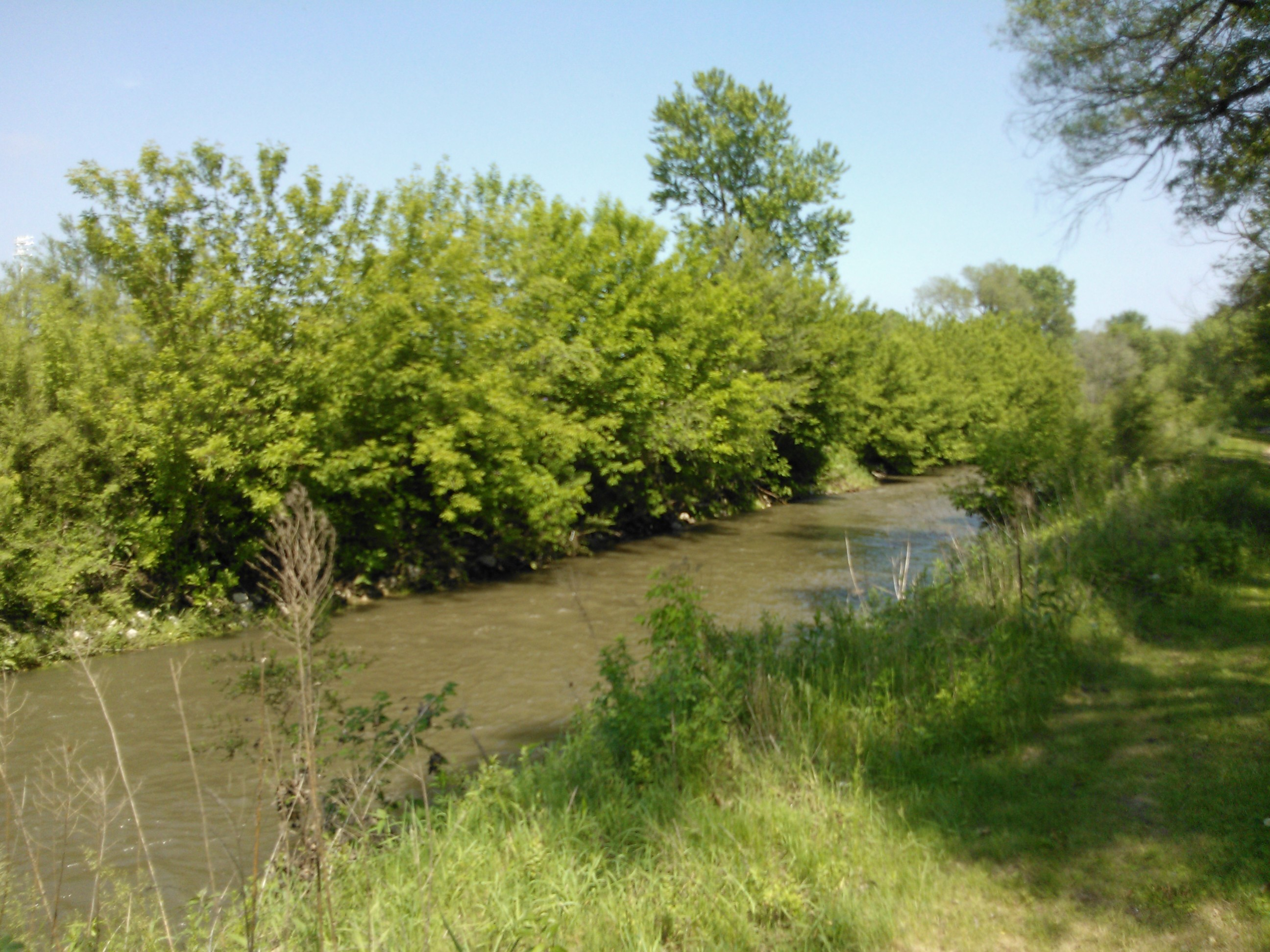
- Duck Creek in Davenport

Location
- Country: United States
- State: Iowa

Physical characteristics
- Source: Scott County, Iowa
  - coordinates: 41°32′57″N 90°44′57″W
- Mouth: Mississippi River
  - coordinates: 41°31′25″N 90°28′30″W

Duck Creek is a minor tributary of the Mississippi River in the United States. The creek runs through Scott County, Iowa, and the cities of Davenport, Bettendorf, and Riverdale.

== Course ==
Duck Creek begins in the rural areas north of Blue Grass and it empties into the Mississippi River between Bettendorf and Riverdale. At 19 miles (31 km) long it is the largest creek in the Quad Cities and is mainly used for storm water runoff. Duck Creek's watershed covers a total of 40,294 acres (16,306 ha). Of the total, 24,718 acres (10,003 ha), or 61%, are in Davenport; 12,231 acres (4,950 ha), or 31%, are in unincorporated Scott County and 3,345 acres (1,354 ha), or 8%, are in Bettendorf. The Duck Creek watershed flows through 35,511 acres (14,371 ha) of private land and 4,783 acres (1,936 ha) of public land. The creek's water has elevated levels of E. coli bacteria, nitrates and chloride. Duck Creek has many tributaries; among them are Silver Creek, Goose Creek, Pheasant Creek, Stafford Creek, Candlelight Creek, Robin Creek, Cardinal Creek and several unnamed streams. Duck Creek Parkway has 13.5 miles (22 km) of bike trail that follows the creek through Davenport, Bettendorf, and Riverdale. It starts at Haven's Acres Park in Riverdale, follows Duck Creek through Devil's Glen Park, Hollow View Park, and Veterans' Memorial Park in Bettendorf and ends at Emeis Park and Golf Course in Davenport. Duck Creek shares its name with a park and golf course on Davenport's border with Bettendorf called Duck Creek Park and Golf Course. Other parks along the creek and bike path include Middle, Eastern, Garfield, Junge, Marquette and Northwest.

== 1990 flood ==
In June 1990, Duck Creek experienced a major flash flood event. Rainfall for the month of May was 3.5 inches (9 cm) above normal for the month and the rains continued into June. A thunderstorm with heavy rains passed over the Quad Cities on June 16. Because of the development around the creek, the rain water washed into the creek bed, which quickly rose. More than 8,000 homes and business were flooded. Damage estimates for that day exceeded $25 million.

== 2008 flood ==
On June 13, 2008, Duck Creek rose 4 feet (1.2 m) out of its banks. During the night of June 12 and 13 the Quad Cities experienced a rainfall record when 3.28 inches (8.3 cm) fell in six hours. Sections of Harrison Street, Brady Street, Welcome Way and Eastern Avenue were all closed while other north–south streets remained open. Other parts of the city saw flooding as well. The Mississippi River was already significantly above flood stage at that same time, as were other rivers in the region.

== See also ==
- List of rivers of Iowa
