= Duck Creek Park and Golf Course =

Park and golf course in Davenport, Iowa, United States

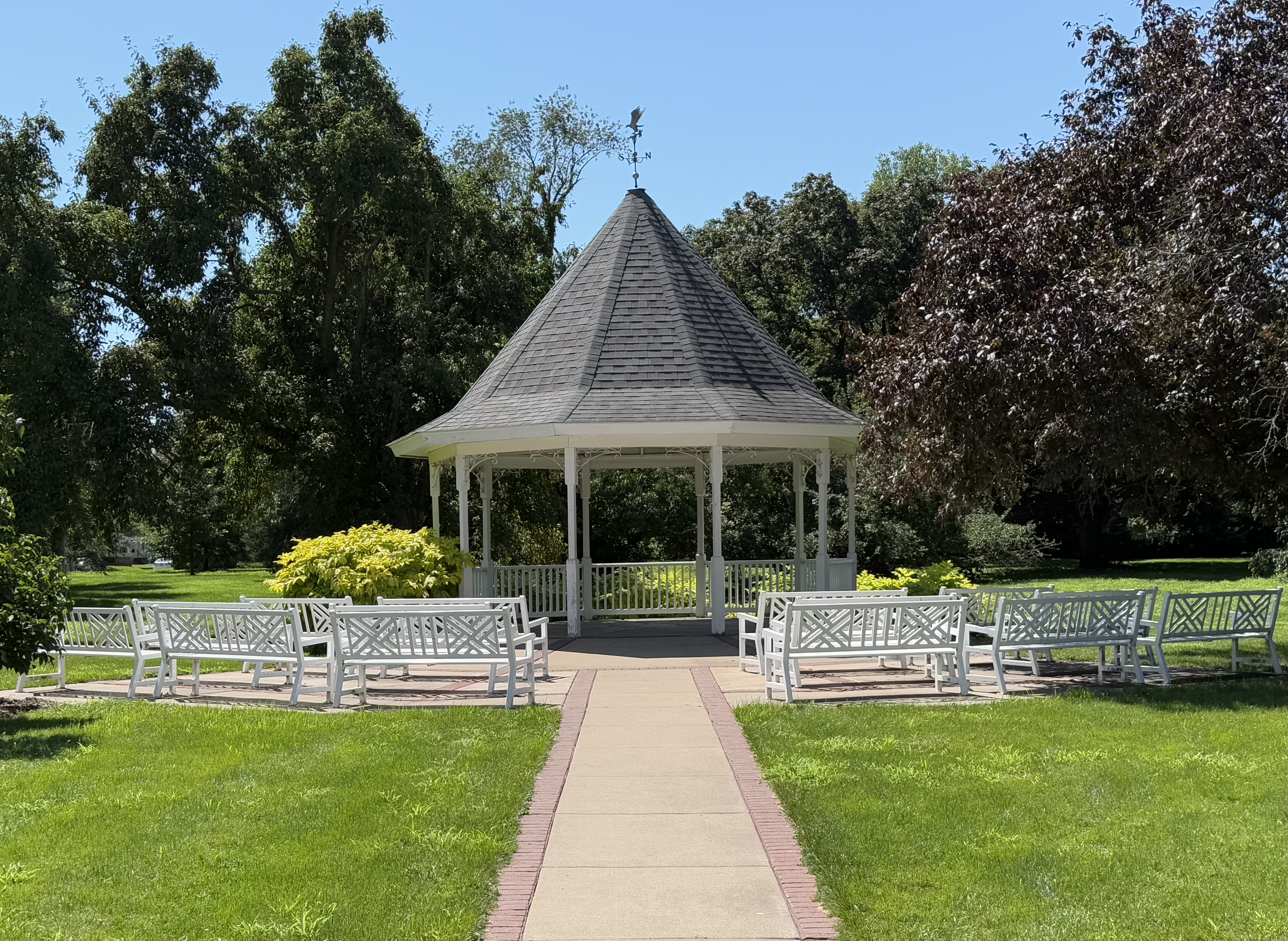
- Gazebo
- Interactive map of Duck Creek Park and Golf Course
- Type: Public park
- Location: Davenport, Iowa
- Coordinates: 41°32′37″N 90°31′30″W
- Area: 211-acre (0.85 km^{2})
- Created: 1930s
- Operator: Davenport Parks and Recreation
- Open: Year round
- Website: Official website

Duck Creek Park and Golf Course is located on the east side of Davenport, Iowa, United States. The property was originally a private arboretum south of Duck Creek. It was developed in the 1930s as a public works project during the Great Depression. The 211-acre (0.85 km^{2}) park features picnic shelters, tennis courts, playground, a public golf course and Duck Creek Lodge. The Stampe Lilac Garden and Gazebo is a popular location for weddings. The park connects with the Duck Creek Parkway.

The golf course is an 18-hole, par 70 course. It is a 140-acre (0.57 km^{2}) course and is 5,759-yard (5,266 m) long. The course features mature trees and rolling hills. An automatic drainage system was installed in 1994.

== See also ==
- Emeis Park and Golf Course
