= Chicago, Milwaukee, St. Paul and Pacific Freight House =

- U.S. National Register of Historic Places
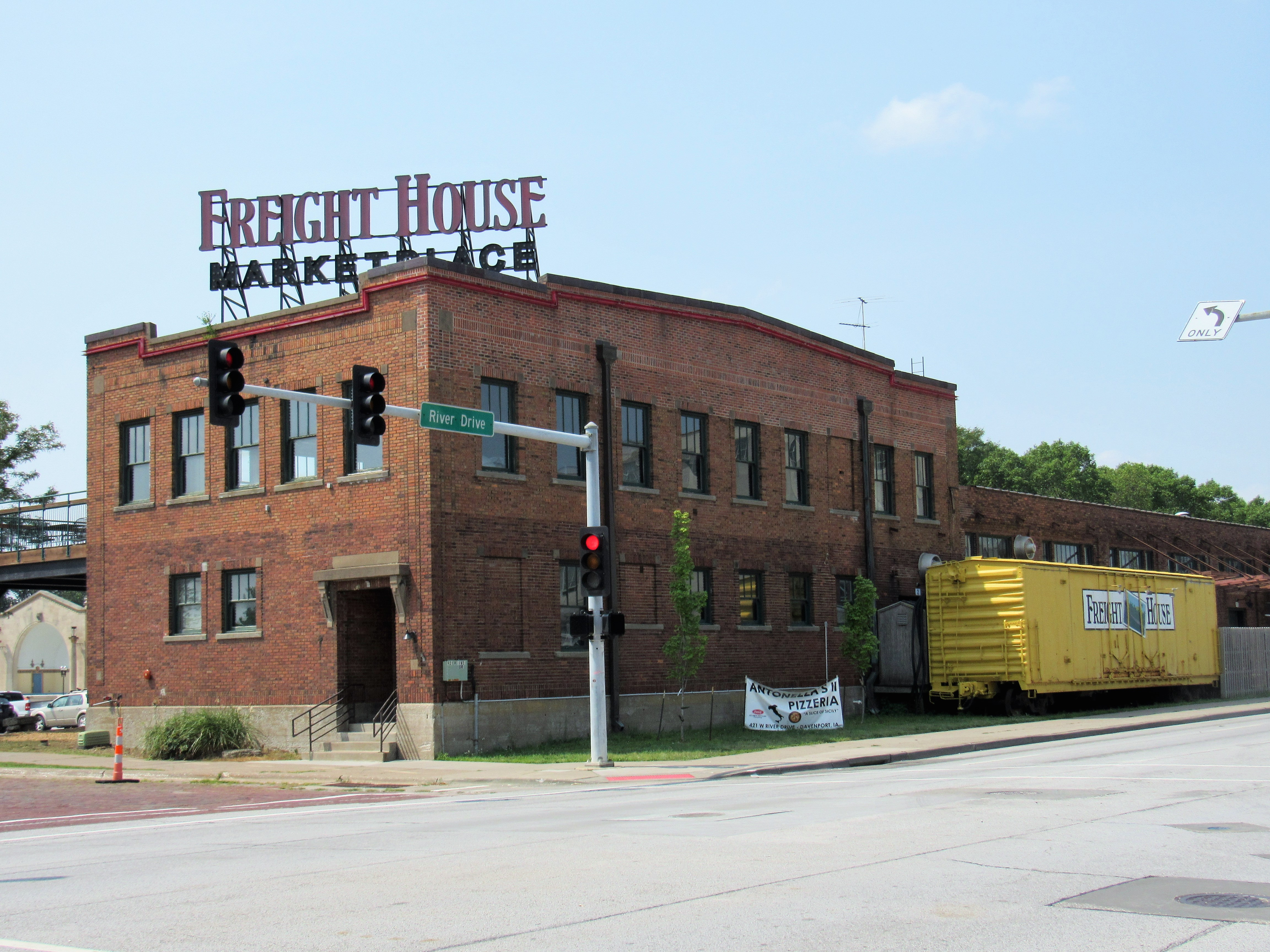

- Location within Iowa Location within the United States
- Location: 102 S. Ripley St. Davenport, Iowa
- Coordinates: 41°31′12″N 90°34′46″W
- Area: 2 acres (0.81 ha)
- Built: 1917
- MPS: Davenport MRA
- NRHP reference No.: 85002825
- Added to NRHP: November 14, 1985

The Chicago, Milwaukee, St. Paul and Pacific Freight House, known locally as The Freight House, is a historic building in Downtown Davenport, Iowa, United States. It was listed on the National Register of Historic Places in 1985.

== History ==
This Freight House was built by the Chicago, Milwaukee, St. Paul and Pacific Railroad (The Milwaukee Road) in 1917 in response to the increased freight traffic in Davenport before the country entered World War I. It was built on the levee near the Mississippi River. The railroad built the Crescent Rail Bridge with the Chicago, Burlington and Quincy Railroad to the west in 1901, and they joined in building Union Station across Ripley Street in 1924. Railroad freight factored in the development of the city's wholesale and retail commercial economy from the 1890s onward. Because of Davenport's location, railroad freight could be charged favorable eastern rates while western rates could also be accessed. This gave the city an advantage over in-state communities.

The freight house was placed on the National Register of Historic Places due to its association with the commercial development of Davenport, Iowa. After being renovated in the 1990s, The Freight House has seen a variety of uses, such as a comedy club, sports bar, piano bar, and restaurant. Currently, the freight house is home to several small businesses featuring locally grown items, such as a deli, a grocery hub, and a tap room for a local brewery.

== Architecture ==
The building is rectangular in shape and built of brick with concrete floors and columns. The eastern end is two stories and held the offices. The west end held the warehouse storage space in a single story. The facility was located between the rail siding and thoroughfare where cargo could be easily transferred from one transportation system to another.
