= Quad Cities MetroLINK =

Bus service in the Quad Cities of Illinois

MetroLINK Quad Cities

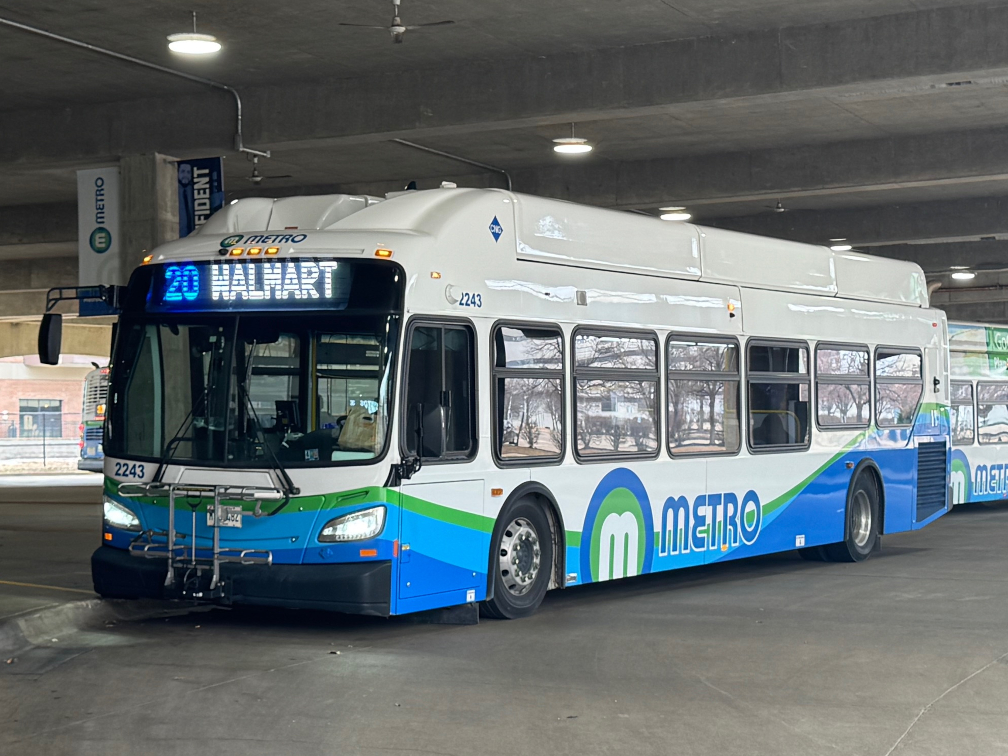
- MetroLINK #2243, a 2022 New Flyer XN40 bus fueled by compressed natural gas.
- Founded: 1970
- Headquarters: 1515 River Dr
- Locale: Moline, Illinois
- Service area: Rock Island County, Illinois; Henry County, Illinois
- Service type: Bus service
- Routes: 14
- Fleet: 67
- Fuel type: CNG, Electric
- Website: metroqc.com

The Quad Cities MetroLINK, officially the Rock Island County Metropolitan Mass Transit District, provides mass transportation for the Illinois half of the Quad Cities metro area. Both Iowa cities that make up the region have their own systems, several MetroLINK routes connect with Davenport CitiBus, and Bettendorf Transit. It is the only transit system in the Quad Cities that operates seven days a week. The annual ridership is 3.5 million.

== History ==
Quad Cities MetroLINK began service in 1970, as the Rock Island County Metropolitan Mass Transit District, to revive the local transit system, which had been privately operated. Throughout its early history, the agency was branded as RICMMTD, but in 1988, a public contest replaced this name with "MetroLINK" to improve name recognition. 1998 saw the introduction of Channel Cat ferry service on the Mississippi River, while Compressed Natural Gas buses first appeared on the streets in 2002. In 2012, MetroLINK was named "Outstanding Public Transportation System of the Year" for systems carrying 1-4 million passengers annually by the American Public Transportation Association. In 2018, MetroLINK deployed its first three all-electric zero emission buses into service, with the electric bus fleet continuing to expand.

== Route list ==
- 10-Red (Mon-Sat) - District Station to N. 20th St. & 2nd Ave. Hampton IL
- 20-Blue (Mon-Sat) - Centre Station to Quad City International Airport
- 30-Green (Mon-Sat) - District Station to Colona IL via 18th Ave./19th Ave./Ave. of the Cities
- 40-Orange (Mon-Sat) - District Station to SW Rock Island Industrial Park and Bally's Casino
- 50-Olive (Mon-Sat) - East Pointe to Illini Tower/Silvis Hy-Vee
- 53-Lime (Mon-Sat) - District Station to Kohl's/Target/Hy-Vee Moline
- 53 - Late Night (Thu-Sat, 10:27 PM- 3:20 AM) - District Station to Augustana College
- 55-Sky Blue (Mon-Sat) - East Pointe to Silvis Wal-Mart
- 57-Brown (Mon-Sat) - Centre Station to Rock Valley Plaza to Valley View Drive Moline
- 59-Maroon (Mon-Sat) - Centre Station to Black Hawk College and Kennedy Square
- 60-Yellow (Mon-Sat) - District Station to Black Hawk College via 5th St./Blackhawk Rd./38th Ave.
- 70-Purple (Mon-Sat) - Centre Station to SW Rock Island Industrial Park
- 80-Pink (Mon-Fri, 5:45 AM-8:00 AM, 2:45 PM-4:30 PM) - Centre Station to Arsenal Clock Tower
- Tyson Express Davenport, Iowa to Tyson in Joslin Illinois
- WIU Connect Centre Station Moline to Western Illinois University Riverfront Campus to The Bend in East Moline.

Sunday Service

- 10-Red - District Station to East Pointe via Centre Station
- 20-Blue - :15 Centre Station South Park Mall Quad City International Airport
- 20 Blue - :45 Centre Station South Park Mall Wal-Mart Moline
- 30-Green - District Station to Hy-Vee, Silvis
- 53-Lime - District Station to Augustana College Rock Island
- 40-Orange - District Station to W. 20th Ave., Milan
- 60-Yellow - Sunset Heights to Kennedy Square

== Fleet ==
MetroLINK has a fleet of 67 fixed route buses that is composed of twelve 35-foot CNG buses and thirty-eight 40-foot CNG buses. As of 2022, they also have seventeen all-electric buses.

== Stations ==
=== Transfer Stations ===
- Centre Station

Centre Station is the signature hub of the Metro system, located at 1200 River Drive in Moline. It provides connections with nine routes. The facility was completed in April 1998 as a part of the John Deere Commons Development with a 12 bay, 12,000 square foot terminal. The showpiece for the Centre Station project is the corner clock tower that overlooks River Drive. The stone and brick site is a 350-space parking facility that connects to the TaxSlayer Center via a glass and steel crosswalk. In addition to MetroLINK buses, the facility is also served by intercity buses from Greyhound Lines. In the future, the Centre Station is planned to become a passenger rail hub as part of the Quad Cities train project.

- East Pointe Station

East Pointe Station is located at 1201 14th Avenue, in East Moline and connects three routes on the east end of the Metro system. The station, built in 2006, offers an indoor waiting area with restrooms and real-time signage, and is also equipped with a high tech community room that is available for local events.

- District Station

District Station is Metro's newest station, opening in 2014, as part of a larger transit-oriented development at 1975 2nd Avenue in downtown Rock Island. The Station features ten bus docking stations with canopies, as well as an indoor lobby with restrooms, seating, real-time signage, and an informational kiosk. District Station is currently served by five Metro routes and offers a connection point with Davenport CitiBus Route 7.

=== Mega Stops ===
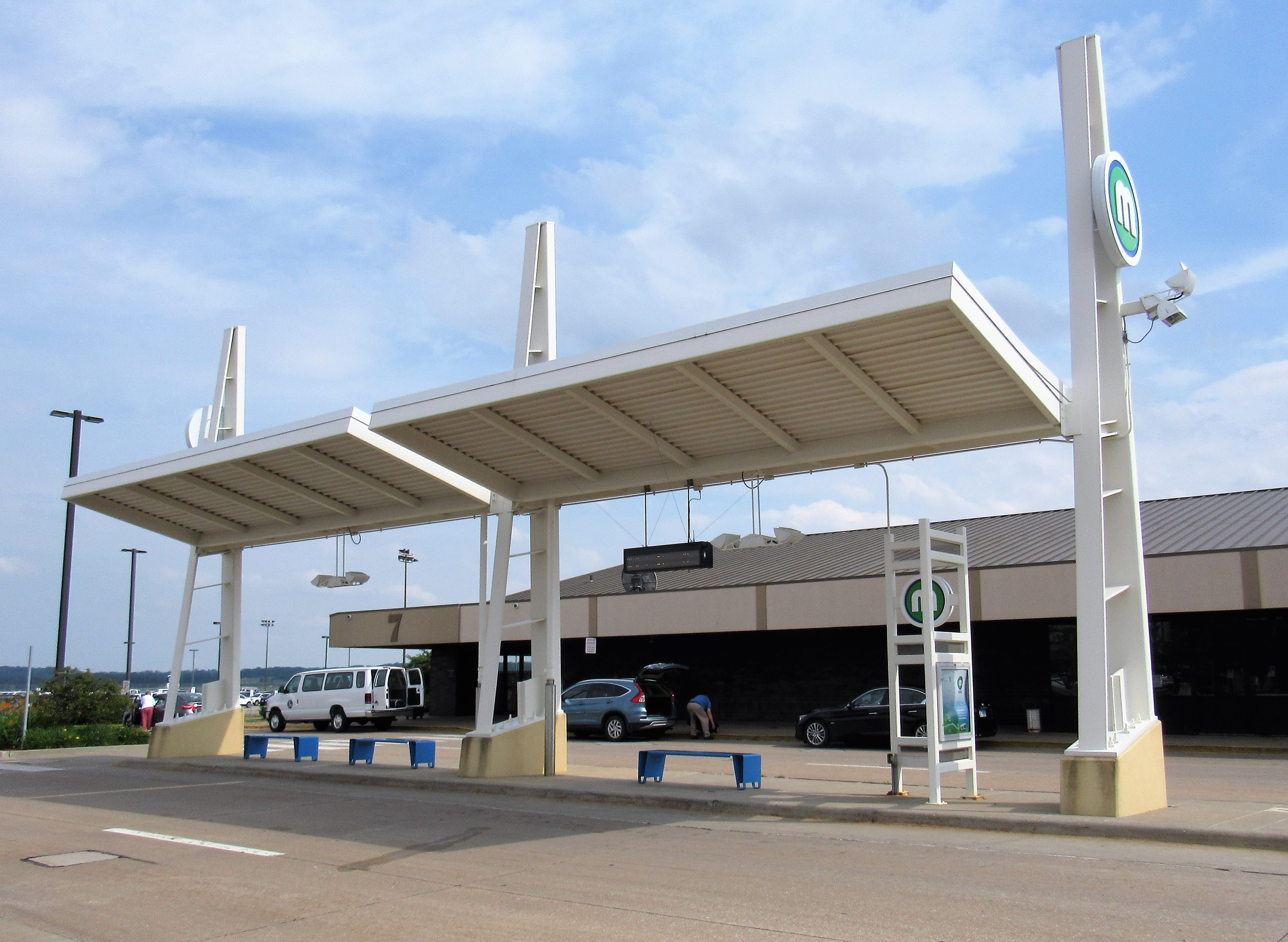
MetroLINK stop at Quad City International Airport

- Quad City International Airport Mega Stop

Constructed in 2011, the QCIA Mega Stop is located directly outside the baggage terminal of the Airport. The Stop features a covered platform with benches, a kiosk with passenger information, lighting, and real-time LED signage. Metro's Route 20 serves the QCIA every half hour, and provides direct access to hotels and downtown Moline.

- SouthPark Mall Mega Stop

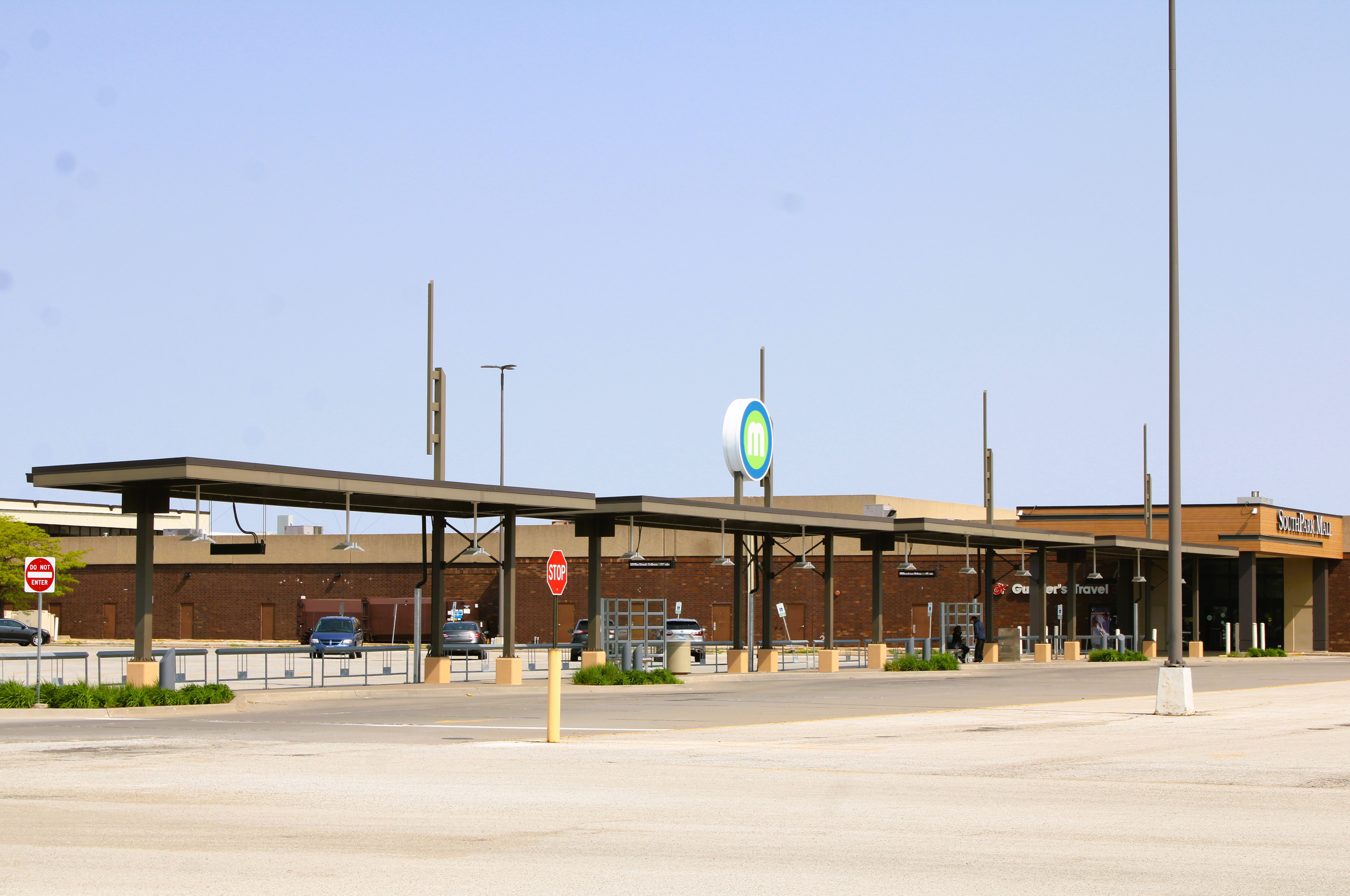
The MetroLINK Mega Stop at SouthPark Mall in 2023

SouthPark Mall is Metro's newest Mega Stop, completed in 2015. The stop, which provides direct connections with the South Mall Entrance, features a covered waiting area with platform, windbreaks with seating, real-time LED signage, lighting, and landscaping. The SouthPark Mall Mega Stop is served by Metro's Route 20 and Route 60.

== Fixed route ridership ==
The ridership and service statistics shown here are of fixed route services only and do not include demand response.

== See also ==
- Davenport Citibus
- List of bus transit systems in the United States
