= Sunderbruch Park =

Park in Davenport, Iowa

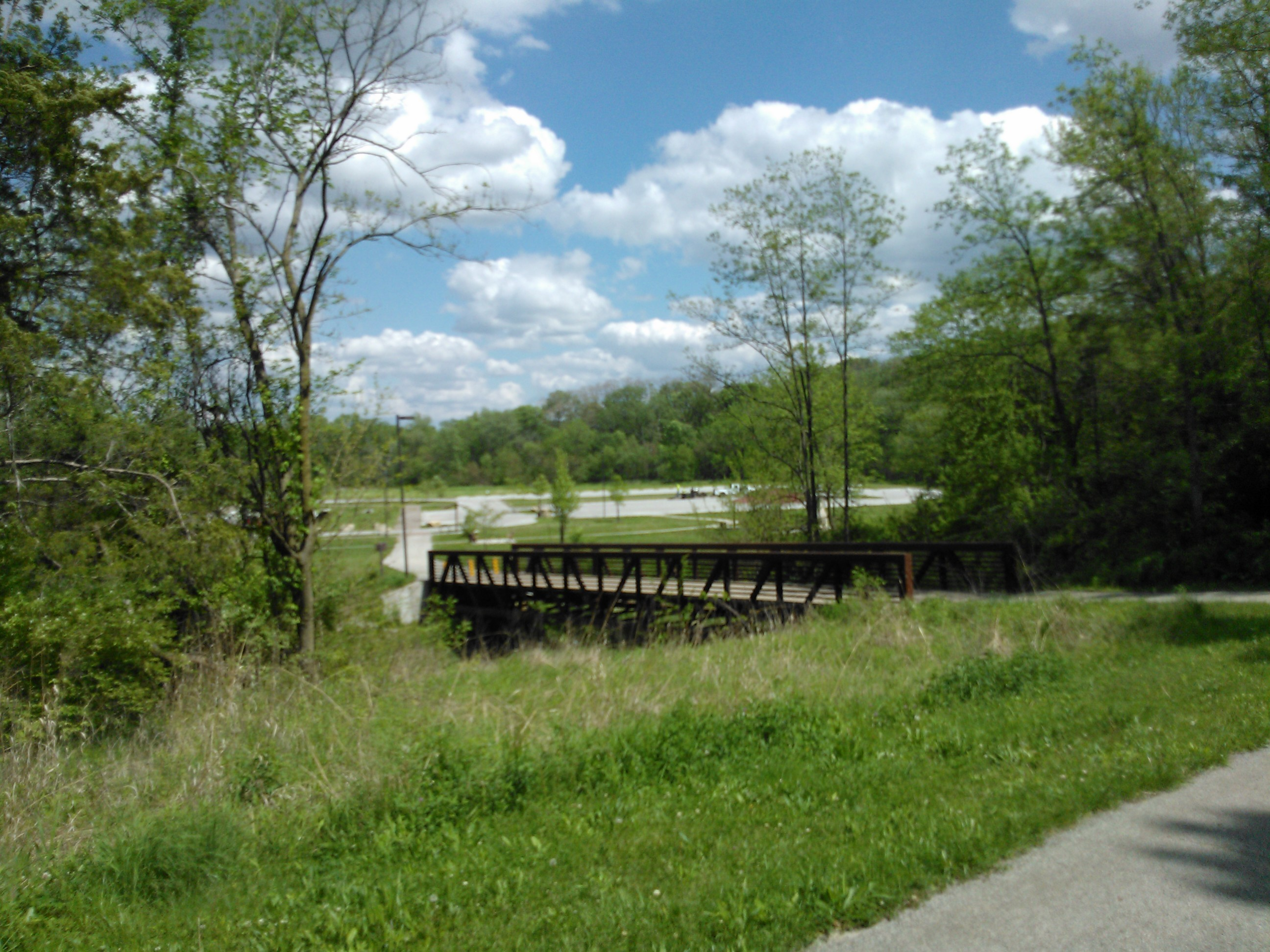
- Interactive map of Sunderbruch Park
- Type: Public park
- Location: 4675 Telegraph Rd., Davenport, Iowa
- Coordinates: 41°31′22″N 90°38′33″W
- Area: 134-acre (0.54 km^{2})
- Created: 2007
- Operator: Davenport Parks and Recreation

Sunderbruch Park is a 134-acre (0.54 km^{2}) park located in the west end of Davenport, Iowa, United States. The park is largely undeveloped and consists of three different trail systems: hiking, off-road biking and equestrian. The off-road biking trails includes difficulty ranging from green to black diamond in its seven miles (11 km) system. The green trails are two miles (3.2 km) of wooded scenery. It features a few small log crossings, one ladder bridge and one corduroy feature. The blue trails provide moderate changes in elevation, some rooted and off-camber terrain and a variety of corduroy sections and log crossings. The black trails have more challenging ascents and descents in elevation, creek crossings, narrow winding trails, roots, skinnies, drops and multiple log crossings. In addition to the biking trails there are also 4.5 miles (7.2 km) of equestrian trails.

== History ==
The city of Davenport bought the property in the 1970s and it was named Southwest Park, although there was no development of a park until 2005. That year volunteers from the QC Friends of Off-Road Cycling built the off-road bike trails and established the initial routes for the equestrian trails which were later adopted by horseback riding enthusiasts. Sunderbruch Park is the only park that permits horseback riding in the city. In 2006 the park was named for Dr. John Sunderbruch, a Davenport physician, community leader and a lifelong resident of the west end. There are plans to connect the park with the Duck Creek Parkway and the Riverfront Parkway.
