= Union Station (Davenport, Iowa) =

- Union Station and Burlington Freight House
- U.S. National Register of Historic Places
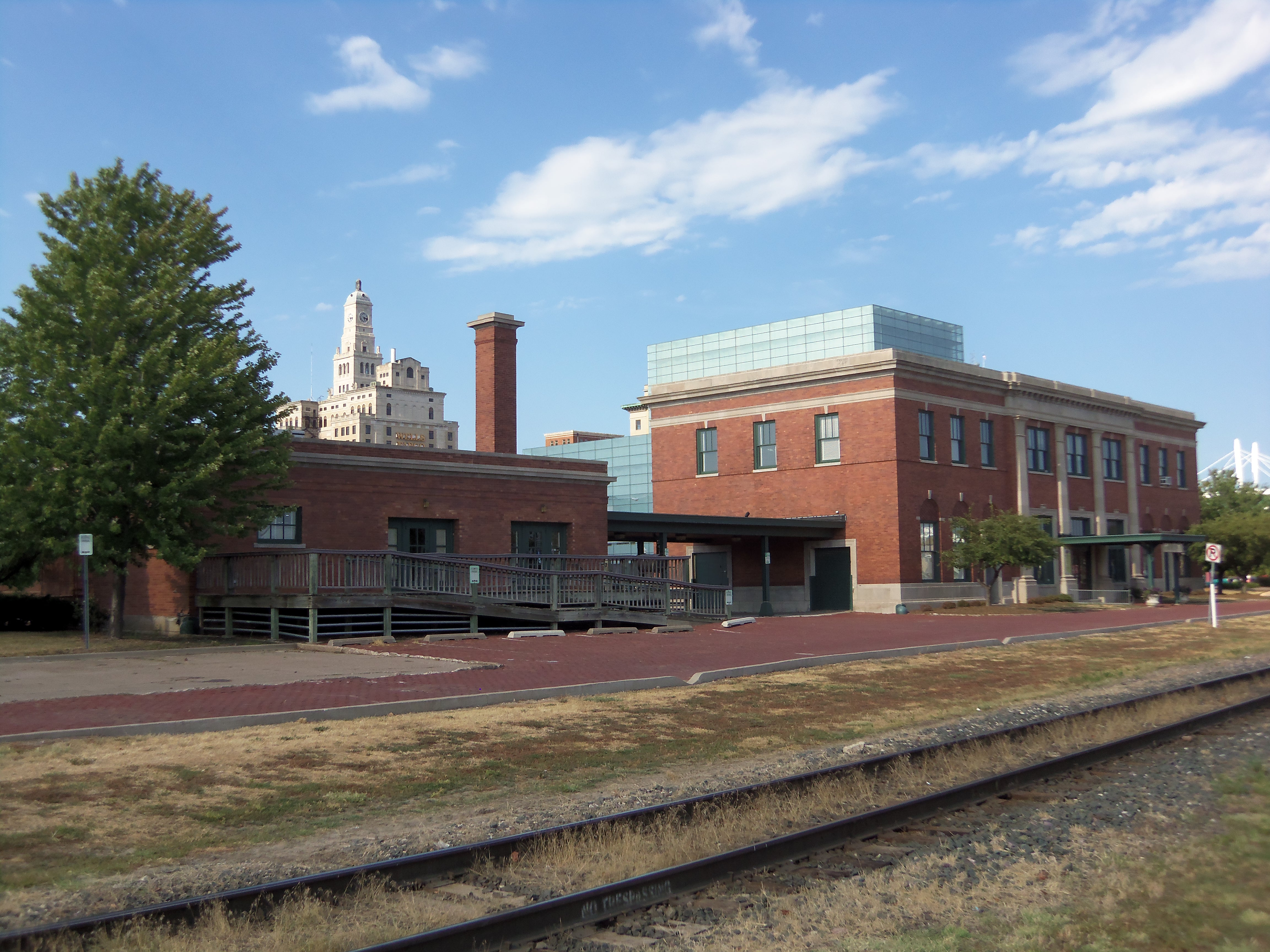
- South façade along the railroad tracks

- Location within Iowa Location within the United States
- Location: 120 S. Harrison St. Davenport, Iowa
- Coordinates: 41°31′12″N 90°34′39″W
- Area: 2 acres (0.81 ha)
- Built: 1924
- Architectural style: Colonial Revival
- MPS: Davenport MRA
- NRHP reference No.: 83002521
- Added to NRHP: July 7, 1983

Union Station, also known as Union Station and Burlington Freight House, is located along the riverfront in downtown Davenport, Iowa, United States. It is listed on the National Register of Historic Places. The buildings are in a section of downtown with several historic structures. Across Ripley Street to the west is the Chicago, Milwaukee, St. Paul and Pacific Freight House, and to the east across Harrison Street is the Dillon Memorial. On River Drive northwest from the Burlington Freight House is The Linograph Company Building. Across Beiderbecke Drive to the south are the W.D. Petersen Memorial Music Pavilion and the Mississippi River.

== History ==
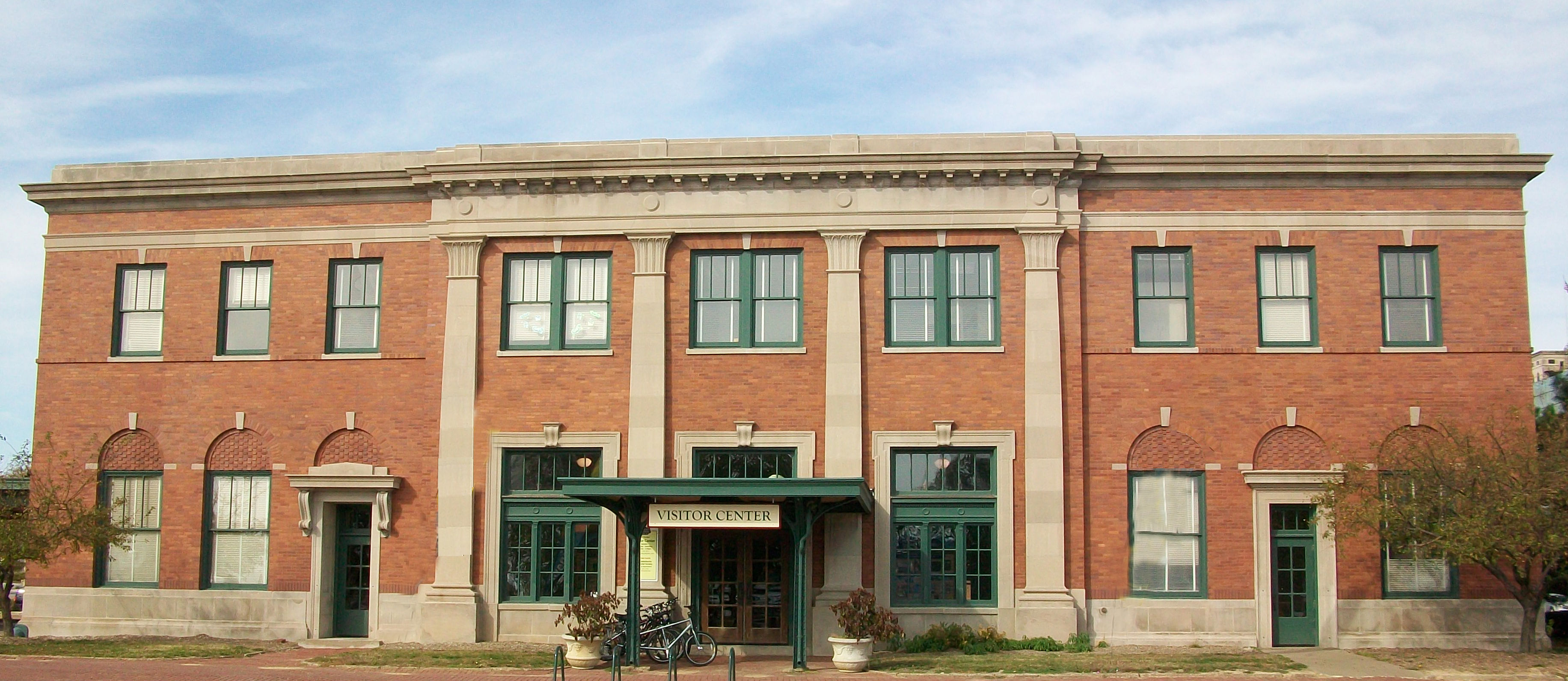
Union Station

Rail service through Davenport was being discussed and planned to start in 1842. Up to this point, however, the Mississippi River had never been crossed by a bridge anywhere. That was accomplished by 1856 when the first railroad bridge was built between Davenport and Rock Island, Illinois, and the city's rail history began. By 1895 several rail lines already passed through Davenport when Frank Blair organized the Davenport, Rock Island and North Western Railway (DRI & NW). In five years the company completed its route to Clinton, Iowa and the Crescent Bridge (1899) across the Mississippi between Davenport and Rock Island. The bridge is downstream from the site of the first railroad bridge that crossed the river.

In 1901, the DRI & NW was purchased by the Chicago, Milwaukee and St. Paul Railroad and the Chicago, Burlington and Quincy Railroad (CBQ). The Milwaukee Road already operated in Davenport while the CBQ did not, this purchase brought its operations to the city. The three railroads each had a station in Davenport and in 1916 plans were made to build a union station on the riverfront. They were revised in 1923 and the following year the DRI & NW and its parent companies built Union Station on the levee grounds. After World War II passenger service started to fade until it was discontinued in the 1950s.

The building eventually became a Trailways bus station. The main floor of the station was used as a visitor center from the 1990s to 2017. The upper floors and the freight house are office space. A $450,000 renovation of the facility was completed in 2009. It is the only passenger train station remaining in Davenport.

== Architecture ==
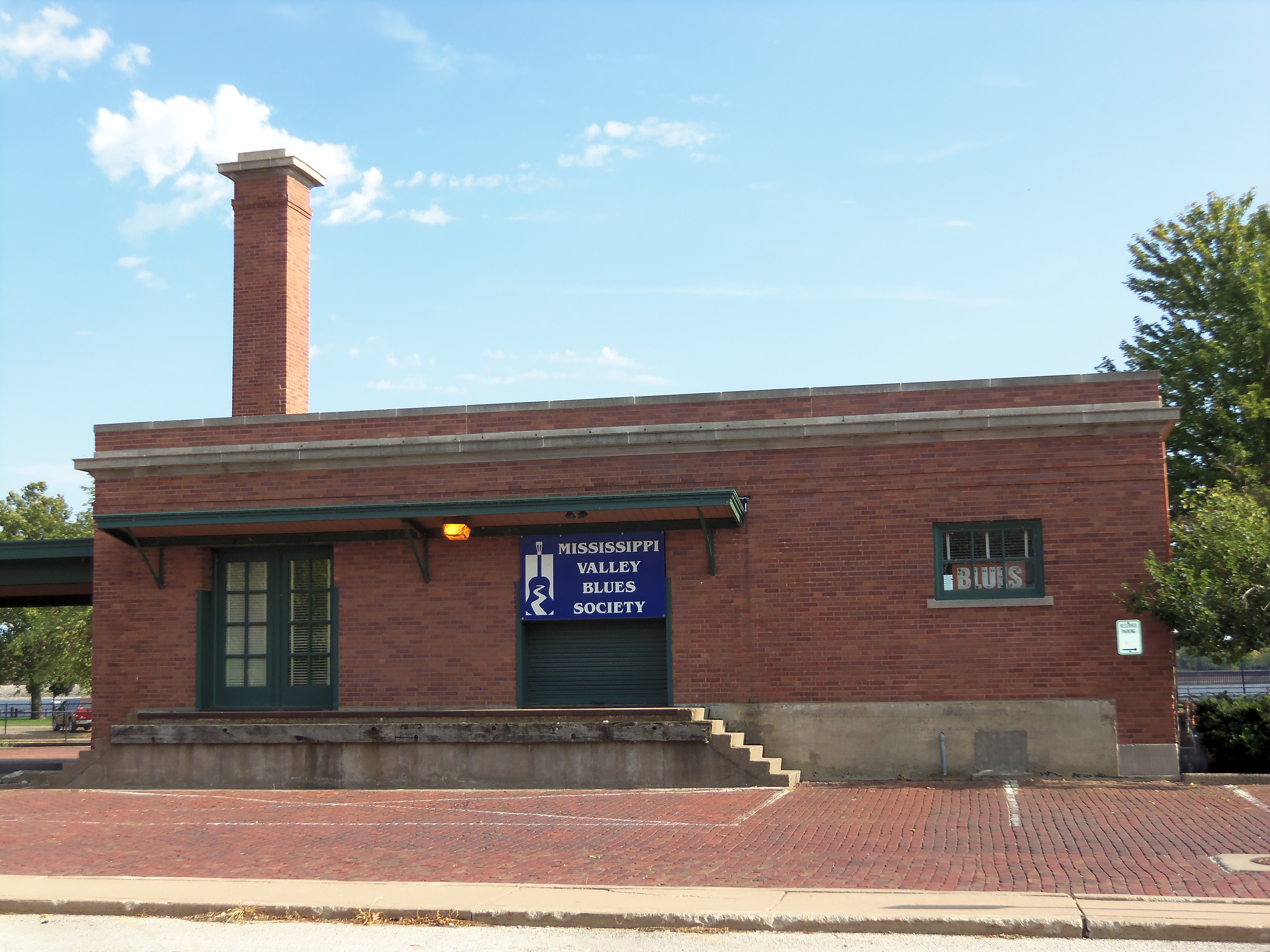
Burlington Freight House

Union Station and the Burlington Freight House are two separate buildings that are joined by a wood post and beam shelter. The station has twin facades. The rail side faces south and the north side faces a parking lot on River Drive. Similarly, the freight house was built with docks on the north and south sides of the building in order to facilitate the transfer of cargo.

The station is a two-story, Georgian Revival, tan brick building. It is built on a concrete foundation. The building features a stylized Greek temple front on the north and south elevations, which emphasizes the building's entrances. The temple features four columns that are attached to the building with tapered, square shafts and stylized capitals. The columns support a Classical entablature that includes dentils, round medallions, and stepped fascia. A heavy cornice crowns the perimeter of the building. The building features rectangular windows on both floors, but the first-floor windows are framed with arches. Keystones made of concrete highlight the windows. Deep awnings are above the primary entrances.

The Burlington Freight House is a single-story building that is constructed with the same materials as Union Station. As mentioned above the building featured docks, with oversized doors on both the north and the south sides of the building. The south dock, however, has been removed to accommodate an access ramp. The architectural style is the same as that of the station. The decorative details on the freight house are limited to a horizontal band of concrete at the cornice level and concrete window sills.

Preceding station	Burlington Route	Following station
Rock Island toward St. Louis	St. Louis – Savanna	Le Claire toward Savanna
Preceding station	Milwaukee Road	Following station
Buffalo toward Kansas City	Kansas City – Savanna	Bettendorf Via Clinton toward Savanna
Buffalo toward Kansas City	Kansas City – Savanna	Rock Island Via Fulton toward Savanna
Oakton toward Maquoketa	Maquoketa – Davenport	Terminus
Oakton toward Monticello	Monticello – Davenport	Terminus
