= Duck Creek Parkway =

Park in Davenport and Bettendorf, Iowa

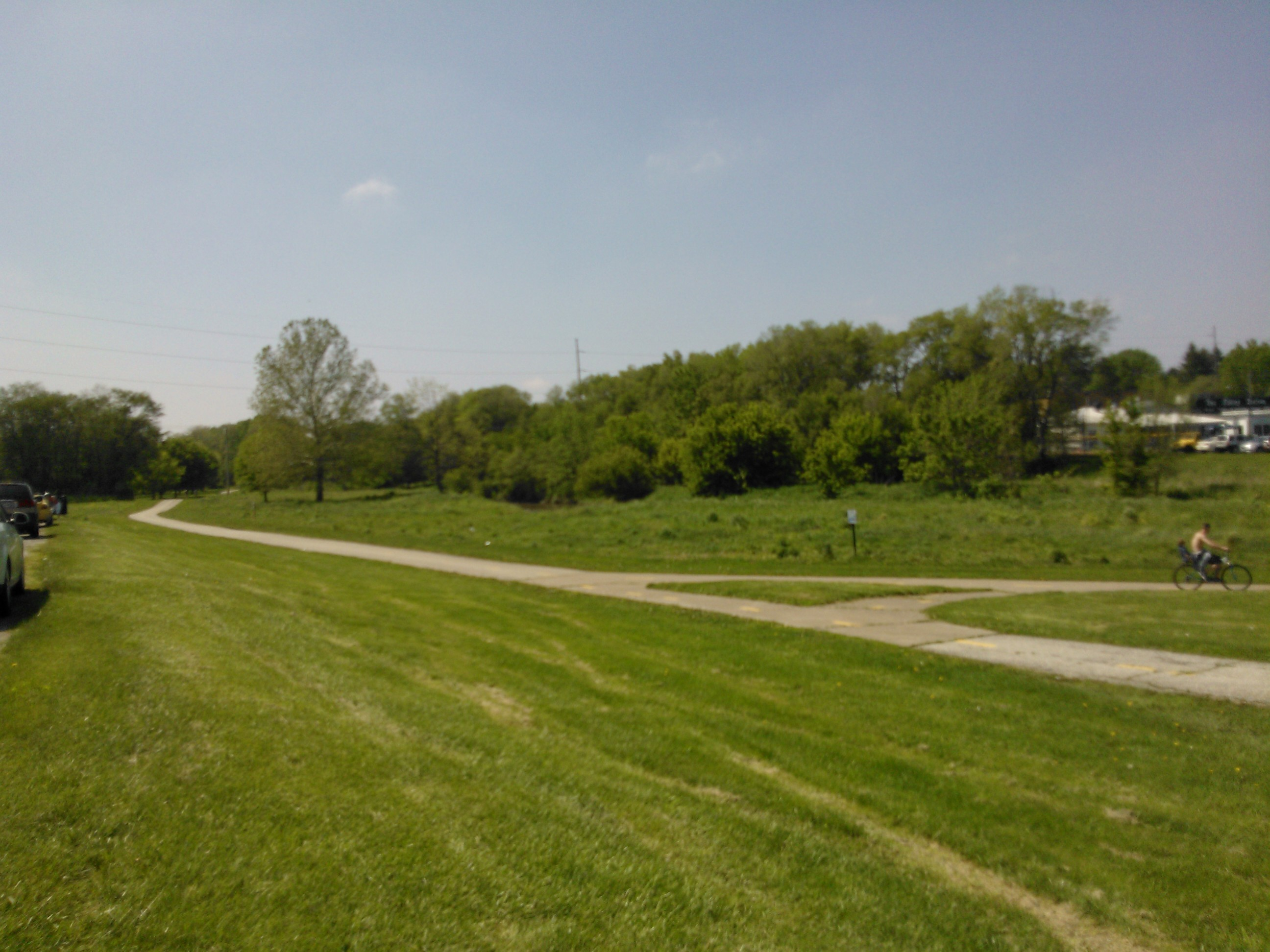
- A portion of the parkway west of Brady Street.
- Interactive map of Duck Creek Parkway
- Type: Public park
- Location: Bettendorf, Iowa; Davenport, Iowa
- Coordinates: 41°33′17″N 90°34′33″W
- Area: 13.5 miles
- Created: 1970s
- Operator: Bettendorf Parks and Recreation; Davenport Parks and Recreation
- Open: Year round
- Public transit: Davenport CitiBus

Duck Creek Parkway is located in the cities of Davenport and Bettendorf in the U.S. state of Iowa. The parkway is 13.5 miles (21.7 km) long and passes through multiple parks as it makes its way along Duck Creek. The parkway is the oldest recreational trail in the Quad Cities and has its roots in the 1930s when the first section was built as a park road. The present design for the parkway and the bike path date from the 1970s. It begins at Emeis Park and Golf Course on the west side of Davenport and passes through Northwest Park, Marquette Park, Junge Park, Garfield Park, Eastern Avenue Park and Duck Creek Park and Golf Course where it enters Bettendorf. In Bettendorf it travels through Middle Park, Veterans Memorial Park and Devils Glen Park before it comes to an end. The parkway stretches 8.36 miles (13.45 km) in Davenport and 5.14 miles (8. 27 km) in Bettendorf. There are plans to connect the parkway and recreational trail with the Riverfront Parkway and Sunderbruch Park.
