= River Bend Transit =

River Bend Transit is the provider of paratransit and demand response transportation in the Iowa portion of the Quad Cities. In 1978, it was formed as the first regional consolidated transportation system in the area. The elderly, persons with disabilities, and low income individuals without transportation to work are the primary users of the system.
