= Emeis Park and Golf Course =

Park in Davenport, Iowa, United States

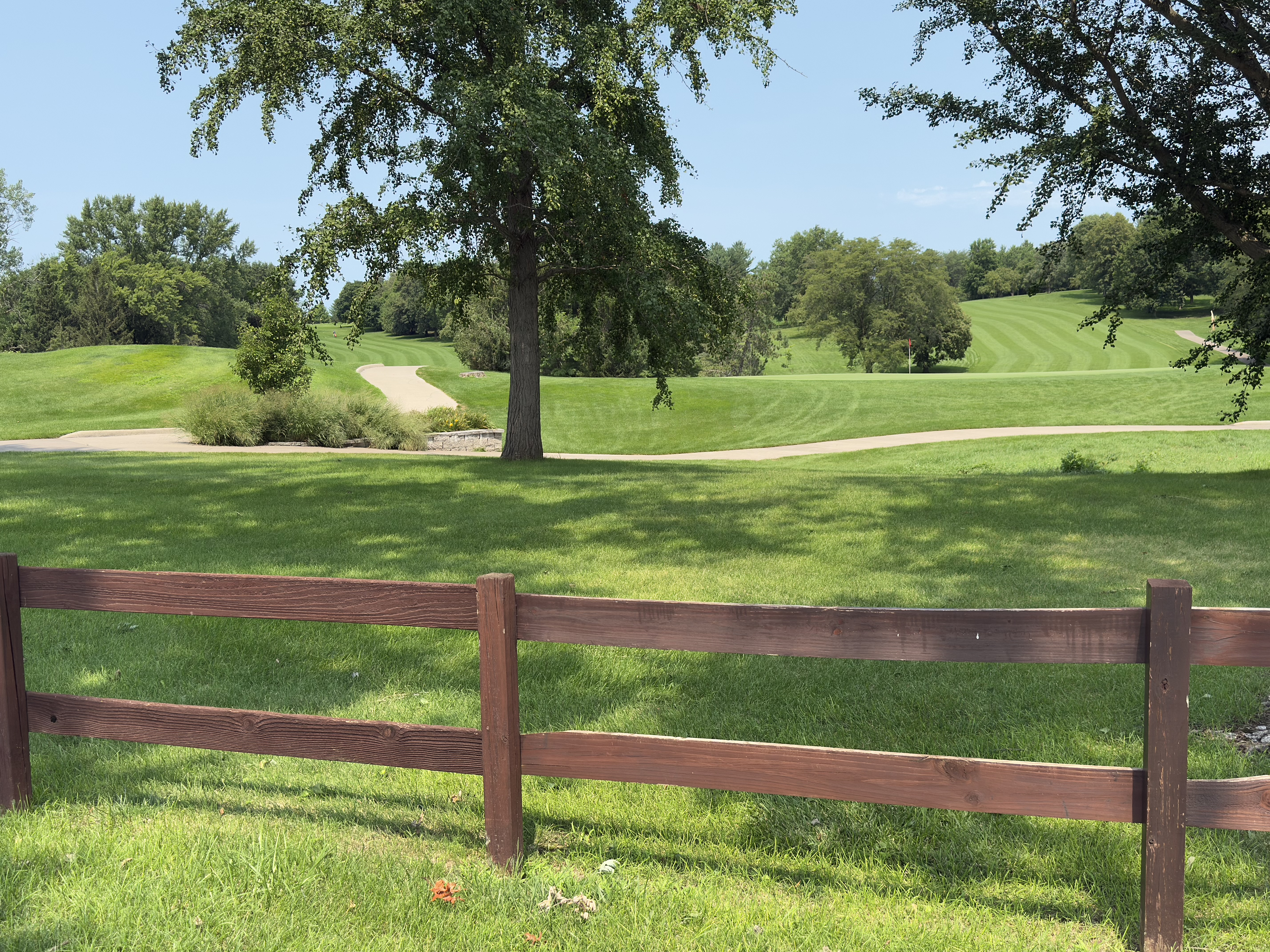
- Interactive map of Emeis Park and Golf Course
- Type: Public park
- Location: Davenport, Iowa
- Coordinates: 41°32′23″N 90°38′28″W
- Area: 210-acre (0.85 km^{2})
- Operator: Davenport Parks and Recreation
- Open: Year round

Emeis Park and Golf Course is a 210-acre (0.85 km^{2}) park located on the west side of Davenport, Iowa, United States. The park features picnic shelters, playground equipment, ball fields, basketball courts, tennis courts and a golf course. It is the western terminus for the Duck Creek Parkway.

The golf course is an 18-hole, par 72 course. It is a 155-acre (0.63 km^{2}) course, 6,500-yard (5,900 m) long, and built on gently rolling hills. Designed by C.D. Wagstaff, the course was inaugurated for public use with an exhibition match between Arnold Palmer and Gary Player held on August 19, 1961. Player shot 68 to Palmer's 69 to win the match. Emeis Golf Course was named to Golf Digest's list of America's Toughest Golf Courses three times from 1966-1968 and continues to be Davenport’s most challenging public golf course. Emeis hosted the 1962 and 1967 NAIA Men's Golf Championship and annually conducts the Quad-City Amateur Golf Tournament as well as qualifying rounds for PGA Tour's John Deere Classic.
