= Crescent Rail Bridge =

Mississippi River railroad bridge

Crescent Bridge
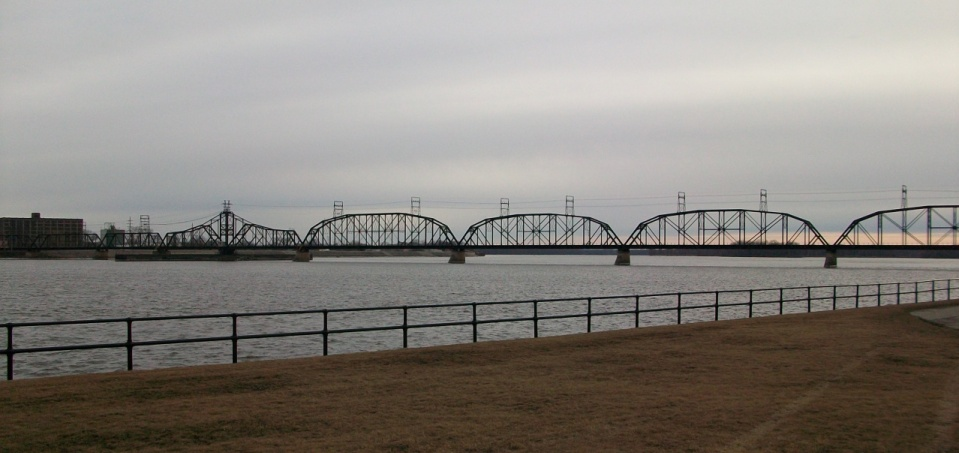
- Coordinates: 41°30′42″N 90°35′41″W
- Carries: 1 Rail line
- Crosses: Mississippi River
- Locale: Davenport, Iowa and Rock Island, Illinois

Characteristics
- Design: Swing bridge

History
- Opened: 1899

Location
- Interactive map of Crescent Bridge

The Crescent Bridge carries a rail line across the Mississippi River between Davenport, Iowa, and Rock Island, Illinois. It was formerly owned by the Davenport, Rock Island and North Western Railway, a joint subsidiary of the Chicago, Burlington and Quincy Railroad and Chicago, Milwaukee, St. Paul and Pacific Railroad, which was split in 1995 between then-joint owners Burlington Northern Railroad and Soo Line Railroad, with BN getting the bridge and the Illinois-side line, and Soo Line getting the Iowa-side line. Since then, after spinning off its lines in the area to I&M Rail Link, later Iowa, Chicago and Eastern Railroad (a subsidiary of the Dakota, Minnesota and Eastern Railroad), the lines were repurchased by the Canadian Pacific Railway, parent of the Soo Line. Meanwhile, BN has merged into the BNSF Railway, the current owner of the bridge.

== See also ==
- List of crossings of the Upper Mississippi River
