= Davenport Citibus =

Transit service in Iowa, United States

Davenport CitiBus

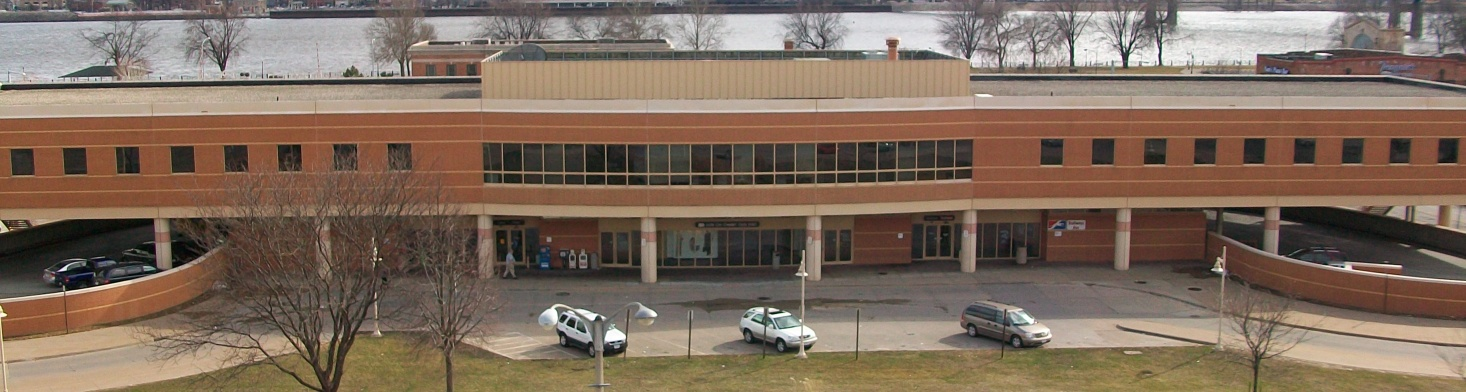
- Davenport Citibus Headquarters on River Drive (U.S. Route 67)
- Founded: 1969
- Headquarters: 300 West River Drive; Davenport, Iowa 52801
- Locale: Davenport, Iowa
- Service type: Bus
- Fleet: 23 buses 2004,2011,2017,2020, and 2022 35ft Gillig Low Floor buses
- Fuel type: Diesel
- Operator: City of Davenport IA & First Transit
- Chief executive: Marla Miller
- Website: CitiBus Transit

Davenport CitiBus is the transit agency serving Davenport, Iowa, United States. CitiBus has a total of twenty-one vehicles and covers approximately 30 square miles (78 km^{2}) of the city. CitiBus connects with both Bettendorf Transit and the Illinois Quad Cities mass transit system, MetroLINK. The system operates Monday to Saturday.

== History ==
Public transit appeared in Davenport in 1969. The authority at first provided monetary support to Davenport City Lines, a privately owned company owned by National City Lines. CitiBus is a division of the Department of Public Works.

== Route list ==
- 1 Orange Line - Ground Transportation Center Via Rockingham Road to Hy-Vee
- 2 Teal Line Ground Transportation Center to Genesis East/Hy-Vee
- 3 Yellow Line - Ground Transportation Center to Rhythm City Casino
- 4 Red Line - Ground Transportation Center to 65th and Welcome Way and NorthPark Mall
- 5 Blue Line - West Kimberly Rd Wal-Mart to Wal-Mart Elmore Ave Via 53rd Street
- 6 Pink Line - Ground Transportation Center to 72nd and NW BLVD
- 7 Brown Line - Ground Transportation Center to Rock Island District Station, Illinois to Burlington Coat Factory Bettendorf
- 8 Green Line - West Kimberly Road Wal-Mart to Burlington Coat Factory Via Locust St.
- 9 Purple Line - Ground Transportation Center to West Kimberly Walmart
- 10 Magenta Line - Burlington Coat Factory Bettendorf to West Kimberly Road Wal-Mart Via Kimberly Road
- Eastern Iowa Industrial Area Route Rock Island Station to North Davenport Industrial Park.

== Ground Transportation Center ==
The Ground Transportation Center serves as the primary hub for Davenport Citibus, while also serving Burlington Trailways intercity buses. It was built in 1985 at 304 West River Drive. The center provides a waiting area with restrooms and other amenities for riders.

== See also ==
- Bettendorf Transit
- Quad Cities MetroLINK
- List of bus transit systems in the United States
