= Illinois Route 167 =

State highway in Knox County, Illinois, US

Illinois Route 167
- IL 167 highlighted in red

Route information
- Maintained by IDOT
- Length: 12.24 mi (19.70 km)
- Existed: 1924–present

Major junctions
- West end: US 34 in Wataga
- East end: IL 180 in Victoria

Location
- Country: United States
- State: Illinois
- Counties: Knox

Highway system
- Illinois State Highway System; Interstate; US; State; Tollways; Scenic
← IL 166	→ IL 169

Illinois Route 167 (IL 167) is a 12.24-mile-long (19.70 km) east–west state road entirely located in Knox County in western Illinois. It runs from U.S. Route 34 (US 34) northeast of Wataga to IL 180 east of Victoria. The route is maintained by the Illinois Department of Transportation.

== Route description ==
Route 167 begins at an intersection with U.S. Route 34 just north of the Wataga city limits. The route dips southeast into Wataga, crossing the BNSF Railroad before following the northern border of the city eastward. Route 167 runs east through rural Sparta Township. The route continues east into Copley Township, passing through more farmland. It passes to the south of a group of small lakes near a junction with County Route 12. The highway continues east into Victoria, where it is locally known as Main Street. It passes through a mixed residential and business area in the village. Route 167 continues east into Victoria Township, passing to the north of Snakeden Hollow State Fish and Wildlife Area. It intersects County Route 28 before terminating at Illinois Route 180. Route 167 is an undivided two-lane surface road for its entire length. The Galesburg and Great Eastern Railroad once followed Illinois 167 from just east of Wataga to Victoria, where it turned south to serve the coal strip mines in the area.

== History ==
Route 167 was established between Wataga and Victoria in 1924. The first unpaved route between Wataga and Victoria was shown on the 1924 Illinois highway map, and this route was paved and numbered by 1929. By 1934, the route was extended to its present eastern terminus at Route 180.

== Major intersections ==
The entire route is in Knox County.

Location	mi	km	Destinations	Notes
Wataga	0.00	0.00	US 34	Western terminus
	12.24	19.70	IL 180	Eastern terminus
1.000 mi = 1.609 km; 1.000 km = 0.621 mi
