= ROWVA High School =

Location
- 346 East ROVA Drive; Oneida, Illinois; USA
- 41°4′29.3″N 90°13′14.1″W

Information
- Type: Public secondary
- School district: R.O.W.V.A. Community Unit School District 208
- Principal: Ben Rees
- Teaching staff: 32.00 (FTE)
- Grades: 7–12
- Enrollment: 232 (2023–2024)
- Student to teacher ratio: 7.25
- Campus: Rural, fringe
- Colors: Gold and white
- Nickname: Tigers
- Website: ROWVA High School

ROWVA High School, ROWVA Senior High School, or RHS, is a public four-year high school located at 346 East ROVA Drive in Oneida, Illinois, a village in Knox County, Illinois, in the Midwestern United States. RHS is part of R.O.W.V.A. Community Unit School District 208, which serves the communities of Rio, Oneida, Wataga, Victoria, and Altona, and also includes ROWVA Junior High School, and Central Elementary School. The campus is 10 miles northeast of Galesburg, Illinois and serves a mixed village and rural residential community. The school is the only high school in the village of Oneida, and lies within the Galesburg micropolitan statistical area.

== Academics ==
ROWVA High School teaches courses in the following academic departments:

- Agriculture
- Art
- Business
- Drivers Education
- English
- Family & Consumer Education
- History
- Industrial Arts
- Media
- Math
- Music
- PE & Health
- Science
- Spanish

== History ==
The history of ROWVA high school is the history of its preceding component schools:

- Rio High School
- Oneida High School
- Victoria High School
- Altona and Walnut Grove High Schools
- ROVA High School
- Wataga High School
