= Illinois Route 180 =

State highway in Illinois, United States

Illinois Route 180
- IL 180 highlighted in red

Route information
- Maintained by IDOT
- Length: 15.43 mi (24.83 km)
- Existed: 1924–present

Major junctions
- South end: US 150 in Williamsfield
- North end: IL 17 in Victoria

Location
- Country: United States
- State: Illinois
- Counties: Knox

Highway system
- Illinois State Highway System; Interstate; US; State; Tollways; Scenic
← I-180	→ IL 184

Illinois Route 180 (IL 180) is a 15.43-mile-long (24.83 km) north–south state road located in Knox County in the central portion of the U.S. state of Illinois. It runs from U.S. Route 150 south of Williamsfield north to Illinois Route 17 south of Galva.

== Route description ==
Route 180 begins at a junction with US 150 south of Williamsfield. From here, the route heads north into Williamsfield. After passing through Williamsfield, the highway continues north through a rural area. The route briefly turns west near Snakeden Hollow State Fish and Wildlife Area before curving north and meeting Illinois Route 167 at its eastern terminus east of Victoria. Route 180 continues north past this junction and passes the community of Centerville. Past Centerville, the highway continues through farmland until its northern terminus at Route 17 south of Galva. Illinois Route 180 is a two-lane road for its entire length.

== History ==
SBI Route 180 was established in 1924. Its routing has not changed since its establishment.

== Major intersections ==
The entire route is in Knox County.

Location	mi	km	Destinations	Notes
Truro Township	0.0	0.0	US 150	Southern terminus of IL 180
Victoria Township	10.4	16.7	IL 167	Eastern terminus of IL 167
Lynn Township	15.4	24.8	IL 17	Northern terminus of IL 180
1.000 mi = 1.609 km; 1.000 km = 0.621 mi
