= Rio, Illinois =

- Village
- Location of Rio in Knox County, Illinois
- Coordinates: 41°06′34″N 90°23′56″W
- Country: United States
- State: Illinois
- County: Knox
- Township: Rio

Area
  - Total: 0.31 sq mi (0.81 km^{2})
  - Land: 0.31 sq mi (0.81 km^{2})
  - Water: 0 sq mi (0.00 km^{2})
- Elevation: 781 ft (238 m)

Population (2020)
  - Total: 209
  - Density: 668.9/sq mi (258.25/km^{2})
- Time zone: UTC-6 (CST)
  - Summer (DST): UTC-5 (CDT)
- ZIP code: 61472
- Area code: 309
- FIPS code: 17-64148
- GNIS feature ID: 2399077

Rio is a village in Knox County, Illinois, United States. It had a population of 209 at the 2020 census and is part of the Galesburg Micropolitan Statistical Area.

Rio is pronounced "Rye-Oh".

== Geography ==
Rio is situated in the northwest corner of Knox County, 13 miles (21 km) north of Galesburg, the county seat. Like other rural neighbors, the village has rich soil ideal for farming corn and soybeans. A few small, unnamed creeks run through its outskirts, and a few small hills that coast under the streets of the village. A few sizable dropoffs throughout the land almost look like shallow or gradual cliffs as some local agricultural fields are rolling and steep. The land drains to North Henderson Creek, a west-flowing stream leading to Henderson Creek to the Mississippi River near Oquawka.

According to the 2021 census gazetteer files, Rio has a total area of 0.31 square miles (0.80 km^{2}), all land.

== Demographics ==
Historical population
Census	Pop.	Note	%±
1960	177		—
1970	186		5.1%
1980	282		51.6%
1990	260		−7.8%
2000	240		−7.7%
2010	220		−8.3%
2020	209		−5.0%
U.S. Decennial Census

As of the 2020 census, there were 209 people, 80 households, and 64 families residing in the village. The population density was 669.87 inhabitants per square mile (258.64/km^{2}). There were 96 housing units at an average density of 307.69 per square mile (118.80/km^{2}). The racial makeup of the village was 89.47% White, 0.00% African American, 0.48% Native American, 0.00% Asian, 0.00% Pacific Islander, 1.91% from other races, and 8.13% from two or more races. Hispanic or Latino of any race were 8.13% of the population.

There were 80 households, out of which 26.3% had children under the age of 18 living with them, 71.25% were married couples living together, 6.25% had a female householder with no husband present, and 20.00% were non-families. 18.75% of all households were made up of individuals, and 12.50% had someone living alone who was 65 years of age or older. The average household size was 2.94 and the average family size was 2.58.

The village's age distribution consisted of 17.0% under the age of 18, 10.2% from 18 to 24, 17.9% from 25 to 44, 29.7% from 45 to 64, and 25.2% who were 65 years of age or older. The median age was 47.9 years. For every 100 females, there were 110.2 males. For every 100 females age 18 and over, there were 116.5 males.

The median income for a household in the village was $62,500, and the median income for a family was $76,250. Males had a median income of $46,250 versus $28,125 for females. The per capita income for the village was $25,711. About 6.3% of families and 11.7% of the population were below the poverty line, including none of those under age 18 and 17.3% of those age 65 or over.

== Education ==
R.O.W.V.A. Community Unit School District 208 comprises five major towns: Rio, Oneida, Wataga, Victoria, and Altona. Pre-K to 2nd grade students attend ROWVA Central in Oneida, 3rd and 4th graders attend ROWVA West in Wataga, and 5th and 6th graders go to ROWVA East in Altona. The junior high, which encompasses 7th and 8th grades, is in Oneida, as is the high school for grades 9th-12th. ROWVA Central, ROWVA Jr. High, and ROWVA High School are all part of one basic building, separated into different sections. ROWVA's school colors are black, gold, and white, with their mascot being a tiger. The school is ending a five-year-long football co-op with AlWood at the end of the 2009 football season, in which they are the A&R Bulldogs (black, silver, and white). Since the 2009 fall season, ROWVA is also part of a sports co-op with Galva where they are the Mid-County Cougars (black, blue, and white.) ROWVA is a part of the Mid-County co-op for golf, cross country, junior high football, and will be adding high school football starting in the 2010 football season.

Previously, Rio had its elementary school, which stands in the town center near the corner of Grande Avenue and North Main Street. It was opened in 1922, the school was closed permanently in 2004 due to high energy costs, a lack of efficient output of students (36 students at date of closing for grades 1–6), and other reasons. After its closure, the building was purchased by Mike Gillette, who agreed to let local children utilize the modest and rusty playground equipment (which has since been removed) as a makeshift park. It has not been transformed into any business, and virtually no architectural or exterior changes have been made.

The village of Rio owns a baseball diamond and the land plot to its west and has turned it into a park with a public pavilion and concession stand for ballgames as well as a large playground structure that was paid for by the village and constructed during a community build day in July 2012.
