= Columbia Heights, Illinois =

- Neighborhood
- Location within Illinois Location within the United States
- Coordinates: 40.9450°N 90.3106°W
- Country: United States
- State: Illinois
- County: Knox County
- Township: Knox
- Village: East Galesburg
- ZIP Code: 61430 (East Galesburg)
- Website: localtown.us/columbia-heights-il

Columbia Heights is a neighborhood in the village of East Galesburg in Knox County, Illinois.
