= Galesburg Township =

Galesburg Township may refer to the following townships in the United States:

- Galesburg Township, Knox County, Illinois
- Galesburg Township, Kingman County, Kansas

== See also ==
- Galesburg City Township, Knox County, Illinois
