= Etherly, Illinois =

Coordinates: 40.993°N 90.086°W

Etherly was a town located in Knox County, Illinois, south of Victoria.

The town was a "company town": a community that was the home of miners working the surrounding coal mines. The mining companies in the area went out of business in the early 20th century and the town was sold. Later, the Sherwood Mining Company bought the area mines as well as the village of Etherly. The houses and buildings in the town were sold and moved, many to nearby communities such as Galesburg and Victoria. The town site was then dug for a strip mine. The Etherly Cemetery is all that remains of the town today.
