= Ontario Township, Knox County, Illinois =

Ontario Township
- Township
- Location in Knox County

- Knox County's location in Illinois
- Coordinates: 41°06′28″N 90°16′09″W
- Country: United States
- State: Illinois
- County: Knox
- Established: November 2, 1852

Area
  - Total: 36.19 sq mi (93.7 km^{2})
  - Land: 36.19 sq mi (93.7 km^{2})
  - Water: 0 sq mi (0 km^{2}) 0%
- Elevation: 791 ft (241 m)

Population (2020)
  - Total: 932
  - Density: 25.8/sq mi (9.94/km^{2})
- Time zone: UTC-6 (CST)
  - Summer (DST): UTC-5 (CDT)
- ZIP codes: 61414, 61467
- FIPS code: 17-095-56172

Ontario Township is one of twenty-one townships in Knox County, Illinois, United States. As of the 2020 census, its population was 932 and it contained 408 housing units.

== Geography ==
According to the 2021 census gazetteer files, Ontario Township has a total area of 36.19 square miles (93.73 km^{2}), all land.

=== Cities, towns, villages ===
- Oneida

=== Unincorporated towns ===
- Ontario at 41.078648°N 90.307626°W

(This list is based on USGS data and may include former settlements.)

=== Cemeteries ===
The township contains these two cemeteries: Oneida and Ontario.

== Demographics ==
As of the 2020 census there were 932 people, 408 households, and 278 families residing in the township. The population density was 25.76 inhabitants per square mile (9.95/km^{2}). There were 408 housing units at an average density of 11.28 per square mile (4.36/km^{2}). The racial makeup of the township was 96.57% White, 0.43% African American, 0.32% Native American, 0.11% Asian, 0.21% Pacific Islander, 0.64% from other races, and 1.72% from two or more races. Hispanic or Latino of any race were 1.29% of the population.

There were 408 households, out of which 35.30% had children under the age of 18 living with them, 58.09% were married couples living together, 7.60% had a female householder with no spouse present, and 31.86% were non-families. 26.50% of all households were made up of individuals, and 12.00% had someone living alone who was 65 years of age or older. The average household size was 2.60 and the average family size was 3.19.

The township's age distribution consisted of 27.1% under the age of 18, 10.4% from 18 to 24, 21.6% from 25 to 44, 29.3% from 45 to 64, and 11.5% who were 65 years of age or older. The median age was 34.0 years. For every 100 females, there were 96.8 males. For every 100 females age 18 and over, there were 81.0 males.

The median income for a household in the township was $81,333, and the median income for a family was $87,500. Males had a median income of $56,591 versus $37,167 for females. The per capita income for the township was $30,321. About 8.3% of families and 6.2% of the population were below the poverty line, including 7.6% of those under age 18 and 23.0% of those age 65 or over.

Historical population
Census	Pop.	Note	%±
2010	943		—
2020	932		−1.2%
U.S. Decennial Census

== School districts ==
- R.O.W.V.A. Community Unit School District 208
- United Community School District 304

== Political districts ==
- Illinois's 18th congressional district
- State House District 74
- State Senate District 37
