= Henderson Township, Knox County, Illinois =

Henderson Township
- Township
- Location in Knox County

- Knox County's location in Illinois
- Coordinates: 41°01′16″N 90°23′11″W
- Country: United States
- State: Illinois
- County: Knox
- Established: November 2, 1852

Area
  - Total: 33.81 sq mi (87.6 km^{2})
  - Land: 33.81 sq mi (87.6 km^{2})
  - Water: 0 sq mi (0 km^{2}) 0%
- Elevation: 774 ft (236 m)

Population (2020)
  - Total: 1,136
  - Density: 33.60/sq mi (12.97/km^{2})
- Time zone: UTC-6 (CST)
  - Summer (DST): UTC-5 (CDT)
- ZIP codes: 61401, 61439, 61467, 61472, 61488
- FIPS code: 17-095-34020

Henderson Township is one of twenty-one townships in Knox County, Illinois, USA. As of the 2020 census, its population was 1,136 and it contained 541 housing units.

== Geography ==
According to the 2021 census gazetteer files, Henderson Township has a total area of 33.81 square miles (87.57 km^{2}), all land.

=== Cities, towns, villages ===
- Henderson

=== Unincorporated towns ===
- Henderson Grove at 41.01976°N 90.411519°W
- Soperville at 41.008649°N 90.397907°W

(This list is based on USGS data and may include former settlements.)

=== Cemeteries ===
The township contains these nine cemeteries: Fuller, Galesburg Research, Gum, Henderson, Henderson Grove, Junk, Oak Lawn Memorial Gardens, Rice-Blue and Soperville.

== Demographics ==
As of the 2020 census there were 1,136 people, 595 households, and 513 families residing in the township. The population density was 33.60 inhabitants per square mile (12.97/km^{2}). There were 541 housing units at an average density of 16.00 per square mile (6.18/km^{2}). The racial makeup of the township was 93.93% White, 1.14% African American, 0.00% Native American, 0.18% Asian, 0.00% Pacific Islander, 1.06% from other races, and 3.70% from two or more races. Hispanic or Latino of any race were 1.94% of the population.

There were 595 households, out of which 29.60% had children under the age of 18 living with them, 82.86% were married couples living together, 2.02% had a female householder with no spouse present, and 13.78% were non-families. 12.90% of all households were made up of individuals, and 9.90% had someone living alone who was 65 years of age or older. The average household size was 2.53 and the average family size was 2.76.

The township's age distribution consisted of 22.7% under the age of 18, 2.6% from 18 to 24, 18.1% from 25 to 44, 33.8% from 45 to 64, and 22.8% who were 65 years of age or older. The median age was 54.5 years. For every 100 females, there were 85.9 males. For every 100 females age 18 and over, there were 90.7 males.

The median income for a household in the township was $64,334, and the median income for a family was $70,039. Males had a median income of $40,204 versus $30,177 for females. The per capita income for the township was $27,674. About 3.7% of families and 6.1% of the population were below the poverty line, including 16.3% of those under age 18 and 3.5% of those age 65 or over.

Historical population
Census	Pop.	Note	%±
2010	1,135		—
2020	1,136		0.1%
U.S. Decennial Census

== School districts ==
- Galesburg Community Unit School District 205
- R.O.W.V.A. Community Unit School District 208
- United Community School District 304

== Political districts ==
- Illinois's 17th congressional district
- State House District 74
- State Senate District 37
