= DeLong, Illinois =

- Unincorporated community
- Location within Illinois Location within the United States
- Coordinates: 40°49′00″N 90°18′16″W
- Country: United States
- State: Illinois
- County: Knox
- Township: Orange
- Elevation: 676 ft (206 m)
- Time zone: UTC-6 (Central (CST))
  - Summer (DST): UTC-5 (CDT)
- Area code: 309
- GNIS feature ID: 407021

DeLong (also called De Long or Delong) is an unincorporated community in Orange Township, Knox County, Illinois, United States. DeLong is located on County Route 5, 5.2 miles (8.4 km) east of Abingdon.

== History ==
DeLong was laid out in 1882, and named in memory of George W. DeLong (1844–1881), a United States Navy officer and explorer. A post office opened at DeLong in 1883, and remained in operation until 1969.
