= Appleton, Illinois =

- Unincorporated community
- Location within Illinois Location within the United States
- Coordinates: 40.936°N 90.161°W
- Country: United States
- State: Illinois
- County: Knox
- Township: Persifer
- Time zone: UTC-6 (CST)
  - Summer (DST): UTC-5 (CDT)
- ZIP code: 61428
- Area code: 309

Appleton is a ghost town in Persifer Township, Knox County, Illinois, United States. Appleton lies approximately one mile north of U.S. Highway 150 and Interstate 74. Knox County Highway 12 runs from north to south through Appleton and the tracks of the BNSF Railway run east to west. Court Creek also flows through Appleton before its confluence with the Spoon River in Dahinda.

== History ==
Appleton was laid out by J. H. Lewis in the spring of 1888, on the S.E. 1-4 of Section 16. It is situated on the north side of the Atchison, Topeka and Santa Fe Railway and is a station on that road. In the early years of the time, Appleton became known for grain and stock exporting.

The site of the original town today is empty except for several streets that served the town. Appleton formerly had a post office, as well as many homes and businesses but was prone to flooding. The size of the town shrank during much of the 20th century, and the final homes located in the original town were relocated to higher ground after the Great Flood of 1993.

A volunteer fire department serves the Appleton area.
