= Rio Township, Knox County, Illinois =

Rio Township
- Township
- Location in Knox County

- Knox County's location in Illinois
- Coordinates: 41°06′19″N 90°23′13″W
- Country: United States
- State: Illinois
- County: Knox
- Established: November 2, 1852

Area
  - Total: 36.14 sq mi (93.6 km^{2})
  - Land: 36.14 sq mi (93.6 km^{2})
  - Water: 0 sq mi (0 km^{2}) 0%
- Elevation: 791 ft (241 m)

Population (2020)
  - Total: 498
  - Density: 13.8/sq mi (5.32/km^{2})
- Time zone: UTC-6 (CST)
  - Summer (DST): UTC-5 (CDT)
- ZIP codes: 61401, 61467, 61472, 61488
- FIPS code: 17-095-64161

Rio Township is one of twenty-one townships in Knox County, Illinois, USA. As of the 2020 census, its population was 498 and it contained 229 housing units.

== Geography ==
According to the 2021 census gazetteer files, Rio Township has a total area of 36.14 square miles (93.60 km^{2}), all land.

=== Cities, towns, villages ===
- Rio

=== Cemeteries ===
The township contains these four cemeteries: Bruner, Deatherage, Rio Baptist and Rio.

=== Airports and landing strips ===
- Johnson Landing Strip

== Demographics ==
As of the 2020 census there were 498 people, 194 households, and 109 families residing in the township. The population density was 13.78 inhabitants per square mile (5.32/km^{2}). There were 229 housing units at an average density of 6.34 per square mile (2.45/km^{2}). The racial makeup of the township was 91.16% White, 0.20% African American, 0.80% Native American, 0.20% Asian, 0.00% Pacific Islander, 1.61% from other races, and 6.02% from two or more races. Hispanic or Latino of any race were 6.22% of the population.

There were 194 households, out of which 17.00% had children under the age of 18 living with them, 52.58% were married couples living together, 2.58% had a female householder with no spouse present, and 43.81% were non-families. 42.80% of all households were made up of individuals, and 28.40% had someone living alone who was 65 years of age or older. The average household size was 2.05 and the average family size was 2.77.

The township's age distribution consisted of 15.1% under the age of 18, 7.3% from 18 to 24, 18.5% from 25 to 44, 27.5% from 45 to 64, and 31.7% who were 65 years of age or older. The median age was 58.3 years. For every 100 females, there were 154.5 males. For every 100 females age 18 and over, there were 146.0 males.

The median income for a household in the township was $63,750, and the median income for a family was $85,089. Males had a median income of $58,750 versus $38,214 for females. The per capita income for the township was $31,766. About 3.7% of families and 6.0% of the population were below the poverty line, including 0.0% of those under age 18 and 7.1% of those age 65 or over.

Historical population
Census	Pop.	Note	%±
2010	518		—
2020	498		−3.9%
U.S. Decennial Census

== School districts ==
- R.O.W.V.A. Community Unit School District 208
- United Community School District 304

== Political districts ==
- Illinois's 17th congressional district
- State House District 74
- State Senate District 37
