= Ontario, Illinois =

- Unincorporated community
- Location within Illinois Location within the United States
- Coordinates: 41°04′43″N 90°18′27″W
- Country: United States
- State: Illinois
- County: Knox
- Township: Ontario
- Elevation: 807 ft (246 m)
- Time zone: UTC-6 (Central (CST))
  - Summer (DST): UTC-5 (CDT)
- Area code: 309
- GNIS feature ID: 423044

Ontario is an unincorporated community in Ontario Township, Knox County, Illinois, United States. Ontario is located at the junction of County Routes 6 and 35, 4 miles (6.4 km) north-northwest of Wataga.
