= Centerville, Knox County, Illinois =

- Unincorporated community
- Location within Illinois Location within the United States
- Coordinates: 41°03′52″N 90°03′15″W
- Country: United States
- State: Illinois
- County: Knox
- Elevation: 781 ft (238 m)
- Time zone: UTC-6 (Central (CST))
  - Summer (DST): UTC-5 (CDT)
- Area code: 309
- GNIS feature ID: 422537

Centerville is an unincorporated community in Knox County, Illinois, United States. The community is located about 3 miles (4.8 km) northeast of Victoria. Centerville is served by Illinois Route 180.
