= Truro Township =

Truro Township may refer to the following townships in the United States:

- Truro Township, Knox County, Illinois
- Truro Township, Franklin County, Ohio
