= Sparta Township, Knox County, Illinois =

Sparta Township
- Township
- Location in Knox County

- Knox County's location in Illinois
- Coordinates: 41°01′14″N 90°16′04″W
- Country: United States
- State: Illinois
- County: Knox
- Established: November 2, 1852

Area
  - Total: 36.11 sq mi (93.5 km^{2})
  - Land: 36.10 sq mi (93.5 km^{2})
  - Water: 0.01 sq mi (0.026 km^{2}) 0.02%
- Elevation: 797 ft (243 m)

Population (2020)
  - Total: 1,064
  - Density: 29.47/sq mi (11.38/km^{2})
- Time zone: UTC-6 (CST)
  - Summer (DST): UTC-5 (CDT)
- ZIP codes: 61401, 61448, 61467, 61488
- FIPS code: 17-095-71435

Sparta Township is one of twenty-one townships in Knox County, Illinois, USA. As of the 2020 census, its population was 1,064 and it contained 511 housing units.

== Geography ==
According to the 2021 census gazetteer files, Sparta Township has a total area of 36.11 square miles (93.52 km^{2}), of which 36.10 square miles (93.50 km^{2}) (or 99.98%) is land and 0.01 square miles (0.03 km^{2}) (or 0.02%) is water.

=== Cities, towns, villages ===
- Wataga

=== Cemeteries ===
The township contains two cemeteries, Robbins and Wataga.

== Demographics ==
As of the 2020 census there were 1,064 people, 410 households, and 268 families residing in the township. The population density was 29.47 inhabitants per square mile (11.38/km^{2}). There were 511 housing units at an average density of 14.15 per square mile (5.46/km^{2}). The racial makeup of the township was 94.45% White, 0.94% African American, 0.00% Native American, 0.38% Asian, 0.00% Pacific Islander, 0.56% from other races, and 3.67% from two or more races. Hispanic or Latino of any race were 3.76% of the population.

There were 410 households, out of which 23.70% had children under the age of 18 living with them, 53.90% were married couples living together, 8.54% had a female householder with no spouse present, and 34.63% were non-families. 26.80% of all households were made up of individuals, and 10.70% had someone living alone who was 65 years of age or older. The average household size was 2.33 and the average family size was 2.87.

The township's age distribution consisted of 24.9% under the age of 18, 10.4% from 18 to 24, 22.4% from 25 to 44, 27.7% from 45 to 64, and 14.6% who were 65 years of age or older. The median age was 37.1 years. For every 100 females, there were 99.8 males. For every 100 females age 18 and over, there were 102.5 males.

The median income for a household in the township was $46,250, and the median income for a family was $60,750. Males had a median income of $40,096 versus $22,885 for females. The per capita income for the township was $22,670. About 20.1% of families and 21.8% of the population were below the poverty line, including 29.8% of those under age 18 and 0.7% of those age 65 or over.

Historical population
Census	Pop.	Note	%±
2010	1,165		—
2020	1,064		−8.7%
U.S. Decennial Census

== School districts ==
- Galesburg Community Unit School District 205
- R.O.W.V.A. Community Unit School District 208

== Political districts ==
- Illinois's 17th congressional district
- State House District 74
- State Senate District 37
