= Indian Point Township, Knox County, Illinois =

Indian Point Township
- Township
- Location in Knox County

- Knox County's location in Illinois
- Coordinates: 40°45′31″N 90°23′34″W
- Country: United States
- State: Illinois
- County: Knox
- Established: November 2, 1852

Area
  - Total: 36.10 sq mi (93.5 km^{2})
  - Land: 36.09 sq mi (93.5 km^{2})
  - Water: 0.01 sq mi (0.026 km^{2}) 0.03%
- Elevation: 712 ft (217 m)

Population (2020)
  - Total: 1,473
  - Density: 40.81/sq mi (15.76/km^{2})
- Time zone: UTC-6 (CST)
  - Summer (DST): UTC-5 (CDT)
- ZIP codes: 61410, 61458, 61474
- FIPS code: 17-095-37361

Indian Point Township is one of twenty-one townships in Knox County, Illinois, USA. As of the 2020 census, its population was 1,473 and it contained 691 housing units.

== Geography ==
According to the 2021 census gazetteer files, Indian Point Township has a total area of 36.10 square miles (93.50 km^{2}), of which 36.09 square miles (93.47 km^{2}) (or 99.97%) is land and 0.01 square miles (0.03 km^{2}) (or 0.03%) is water.

=== Cities, towns, villages ===
- Abingdon (south third)
- St. Augustine

=== Cemeteries ===
The township contains these two cemeteries: Boydston-Dawdy and Hunt.

=== Airports and landing strips ===
- Murks Strip
- Wolfords Airport

== Demographics ==
As of the 2020 census there were 1,473 people, 600 households, and 406 families residing in the township. The population density was 40.81 inhabitants per square mile (15.76/km^{2}). There were 691 housing units at an average density of 19.14 per square mile (7.39/km^{2}). The racial makeup of the township was 94.23% White, 1.22% African American, 0.14% Native American, 0.14% Asian, 0.00% Pacific Islander, 0.61% from other races, and 3.67% from two or more races. Hispanic or Latino of any race were 3.05% of the population.

There were 600 households, out of which 47.00% had children under the age of 18 living with them, 28.50% were married couples living together, 33.83% had a female householder with no spouse present, and 32.33% were non-families. 26.00% of all households were made up of individuals, and 12.80% had someone living alone who was 65 years of age or older. The average household size was 2.85 and the average family size was 3.22.

The township's age distribution consisted of 35.8% under the age of 18, 2.2% from 18 to 24, 29.1% from 25 to 44, 19.2% from 45 to 64, and 13.5% who were 65 years of age or older. The median age was 34.1 years. For every 100 females, there were 122.4 males. For every 100 females age 18 and over, there were 105.4 males.

The median income for a household in the township was $46,944, and the median income for a family was $52,750. Males had a median income of $31,898 versus $25,756 for females. The per capita income for the township was $18,918. About 20.4% of families and 20.0% of the population were below the poverty line, including 23.5% of those under age 18 and 6.9% of those age 65 or over.

Historical population
Census	Pop.	Note	%±
2010	1,554		—
2020	1,473		−5.2%
U.S. Decennial Census

== School districts ==
- Abingdon Community Unit School District 217
- Avon Community Unit School District 176

== Political districts ==
- Illinois's 17th congressional district
- State House District 74
- State Senate District 37
