= Galesburg City Township, Knox County, Illinois =

Galesburg City Township
- Township
- Location in Knox County

- Knox County's location in Illinois
- Coordinates: 40°57′00″N 90°22′41″W
- Country: United States
- State: Illinois
- County: Knox

Area
  - Total: 17.94 sq mi (46.5 km^{2})
  - Land: 17.76 sq mi (46.0 km^{2})
  - Water: 0.18 sq mi (0.47 km^{2}) 0.99%
- Elevation: 764 ft (233 m)

Population (2020)
  - Total: 30,052
  - Density: 1,692/sq mi (653.3/km^{2})
- Time zone: UTC-6 (CST)
  - Summer (DST): UTC-5 (CDT)
- ZIP codes: 61401, 61410, 61436
- FIPS code: 17-095-28352

Galesburg City Township is one of twenty-one townships in Knox County, Illinois, USA. As of the 2020 census, its population was 30,052 and it contained 13,939 housing units. It is coextensive with the city of Galesburg, which is mostly surrounded by Galesburg Township.

In the 2001 fiscal year, the township employed eighteen individuals and operated with expenditures of $849,752.

== Geography ==
According to the 2021 census gazetteer files, Galesburg City Township has a total area of 17.94 square miles (46.46 km^{2}), of which 17.76 square miles (46.00 km^{2}) (or 99.01%) is land and 0.18 square miles (0.47 km^{2}) (or 0.99%) is water.

=== Cemeteries ===
The township contains these six cemeteries: Brookside, East Linwood, Hope, Lewis, Linwood and Memorial Park.

=== Airports and landing strips ===
- Galesburg Cottage Hospital Heliport
- Galesburg Municipal Airport

== Demographics ==
As of the 2020 census there were 30,052 people, 12,495 households, and 6,060 families residing in the township. The population density was 1,675.33 inhabitants per square mile (646.85/km^{2}). There were 13,939 housing units at an average density of 777.07 per square mile (300.03/km^{2}). The racial makeup of the township was 72.93% White, 14.36% African American, 0.30% Native American, 1.01% Asian, 0.04% Pacific Islander, 3.36% from other races, and 8.01% from two or more races. Hispanic or Latino of any race were 8.49% of the population.

There were 12,495 households, out of which 19.90% had children under the age of 18 living with them, 33.88% were married couples living together, 10.00% had a female householder with no spouse present, and 51.50% were non-families. 44.90% of all households were made up of individuals, and 21.30% had someone living alone who was 65 years of age or older. The average household size was 2.10 and the average family size was 2.98.

The township's age distribution consisted of 17.5% under the age of 18, 12.8% from 18 to 24, 23.3% from 25 to 44, 25% from 45 to 64, and 21.3% who were 65 years of age or older. The median age was 41.2 years. For every 100 females, there were 107.5 males. For every 100 females age 18 and over, there were 106.9 males.

The median income for a household in the township was $37,322, and the median income for a family was $63,118. Males had a median income of $32,704 versus $25,461 for females. The per capita income for the township was $22,497. About 11.7% of families and 19.8% of the population were below the poverty line, including 22.2% of those under age 18 and 11.5% of those age 65 or over.

Historical population
Census	Pop.	Note	%±
2010	32,195		—
2020	30,052		−6.7%
U.S. Decennial Census

== School districts ==
- Abingdon Community Unit School District 217
- Galesburg Community Unit School District 205
- Knoxville Community Unit School District 202

== Political districts ==
- Illinois's 17th congressional district
- State House District 74
- State Senate District 37
