= Copley Township, Knox County, Illinois =

Copley Township
- Township
- Location in Knox County

- Knox County's location in Illinois
- Coordinates: 41°01′09″N 90°09′20″W
- Country: United States
- State: Illinois
- County: Knox
- Established: November 2, 1852

Area
  - Total: 35.50 sq mi (91.9 km^{2})
  - Land: 35.07 sq mi (90.8 km^{2})
  - Water: 0.43 sq mi (1.1 km^{2}) 1.20%
- Elevation: 810 ft (247 m)

Population (2020)
  - Total: 402
  - Density: 11.5/sq mi (4.43/km^{2})
- Time zone: UTC-6 (CST)
  - Summer (DST): UTC-5 (CDT)
- ZIP codes: 61414, 61428, 61448, 61467, 61485
- FIPS code: 17-095-16275

Copley Township is one of twenty-one townships in Knox County, Illinois, USA. As of the 2020 census, its population was 402 and it contained 281 housing units. In the 1850 report, the township was named Prince Albert Township. It was later named Richfield Township, and the name was changed to Copley Township on June 8, 1853.

== Geography ==
According to the 2021 census gazetteer files, Copley Township has a total area of 35.50 square miles (91.94 km^{2}), of which 35.07 square miles (90.83 km^{2}) (or 98.80%) is land and 0.43 square miles (1.11 km^{2}) (or 1.20%) is water.

=== Cities, towns, villages ===
- Victoria (west half)
- Oak Run (part)

=== Cemeteries ===
The township contains these four cemeteries: Martin, Old Scotch, Smith and Westfall.

=== Lakes ===
- Corn Crib Lake
- Little John Club Lake
- Long Lake
- Manson Heights Lake
- North Lake
- Peterson Lake
- Roundhouse Lake
- Skender Lake
- South Lake

== Demographics ==
As of the 2020 census there were 402 people, 110 households, and 93 families residing in the township. The population density was 11.32 inhabitants per square mile (4.37/km^{2}). There were 281 housing units at an average density of 7.92 per square mile (3.06/km^{2}). The racial makeup of the township was 95.02% White, 0.00% African American, 0.00% Native American, 0.50% Asian, 0.00% Pacific Islander, 0.75% from other races, and 3.73% from two or more races. Hispanic or Latino of any race were 4.23% of the population.

There were 110 households, out of which 44.50% had children under the age of 18 living with them, 78.18% were married couples living together, 6.36% had a female householder with no spouse present, and 15.45% were non-families. 15.50% of all households were made up of individuals, and none had someone living alone who was 65 years of age or older. The average household size was 2.74 and the average family size was 3.04.

The township's age distribution consisted of 27.9% under the age of 18, 4.0% from 18 to 24, 24.6% from 25 to 44, 23.6% from 45 to 64, and 19.9% who were 65 years of age or older. The median age was 42.3 years. For every 100 females, there were 91.7 males. For every 100 females age 18 and over, there were 87.1 males.

The median income for a household in the township was $82,115, and the median income for a family was $83,125. Males had a median income of $46,250 versus $40,000 for females. The per capita income for the township was $28,430. No families and 0.7% of the population were below the poverty line, including none of those under age 18 and none of those age 65 or over.

Historical population
Census	Pop.	Note	%±
2010	348		—
2020	402		15.5%
U.S. Decennial Census

== School districts ==
- R.O.W.V.A. Community Unit School District 208

== Political districts ==
- Illinois's 18th congressional district
- State House District 74
- State Senate District 37
