= Henderson, Illinois =

- Village
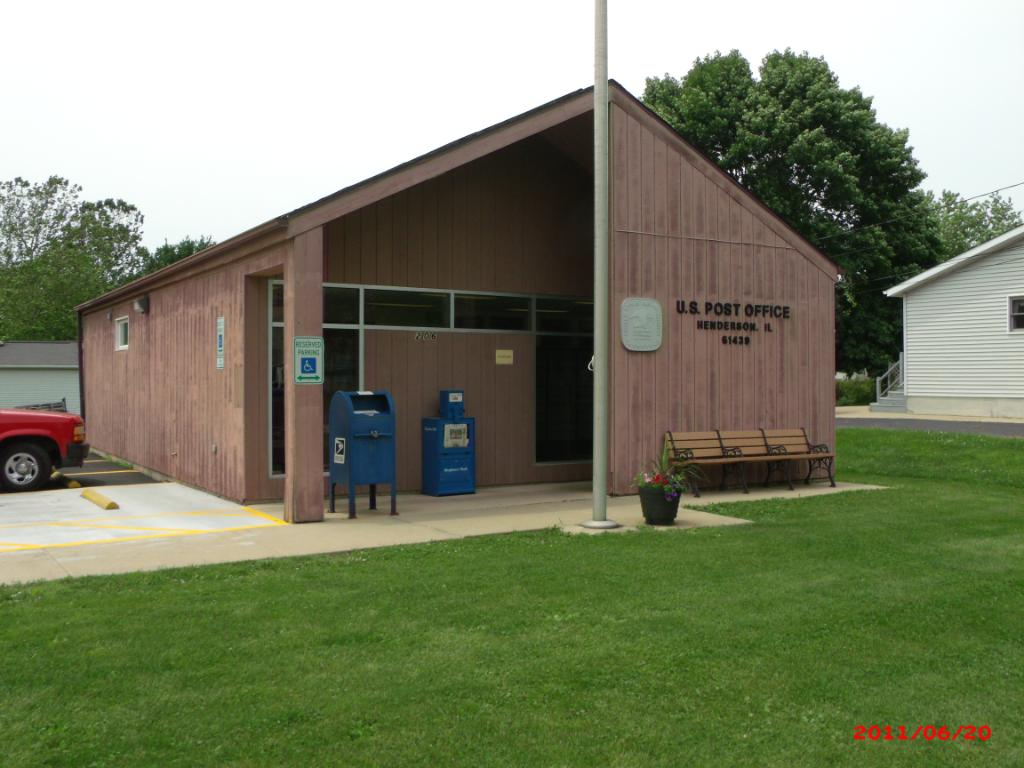
- Henderson post office c. 2011

- Location of Henderson in Knox County, Illinois
- Coordinates: 41°01′26″N 90°21′13″W
- Country: United States
- State: Illinois
- County: Knox
- Township: Henderson

Area
  - Total: 0.27 sq mi (0.69 km^{2})
  - Land: 0.27 sq mi (0.69 km^{2})
  - Water: 0 sq mi (0.00 km^{2})
- Elevation: 817 ft (249 m)

Population (2020)
  - Total: 266
  - Density: 1,002.8/sq mi (387.19/km^{2})
- Time zone: UTC-6 (CST)
  - Summer (DST): UTC-5 (CDT)
- ZIP code: 61439
- Area code: 309
- FIPS code: 17-34007
- GNIS feature ID: 2398487

Henderson is a village in Knox County, Illinois, United States. The population was 266 at the 2020 census. It is part of the Galesburg Micropolitan Statistical Area.

== Geography ==
Henderson is located in northwestern Knox County 6 miles (10 km) north of Galesburg, the county seat.

According to the 2021 census gazetteer files, Henderson has a total area of 0.27 square miles (0.70 km^{2}), all land.

== Demographics ==
Historical population
Census	Pop.	Note	%±
1880	198		—
1890	163		−17.7%
1900	170		4.3%
1910	171		0.6%
1920	156		−8.8%
1930	162		3.8%
1940	152		−6.2%
1950	166		9.2%
1960	212		27.7%
1970	210		−0.9%
1980	369		75.7%
1990	290		−21.4%
2000	319		10.0%
2010	255		−20.1%
2020	266		4.3%
U.S. Decennial Census

As of the 2020 census there were 266 people, 110 households, and 81 families residing in the village. The population density was 1,003.77 inhabitants per square mile (387.56/km^{2}). There were 126 housing units at an average density of 475.47 per square mile (183.58/km^{2}). The racial makeup of the village was 92.48% White, 1.13% African American, 0.00% Native American, 0.00% Asian, 0.00% Pacific Islander, 0.75% from other races, and 5.64% from two or more races. Hispanic or Latino of any race were 3.38% of the population.

There were 110 households, out of which 31.8% had children under the age of 18 living with them, 55.45% were married couples living together, 10.91% had a female householder with no husband present, and 26.36% were non-families. 21.82% of all households were made up of individuals, and 10.00% had someone living alone who was 65 years of age or older. The average household size was 2.98 and the average family size was 2.55.

The village's age distribution consisted of 32.9% under the age of 18, 9.6% from 18 to 24, 15.3% from 25 to 44, 25% from 45 to 64, and 17.1% who were 65 years of age or older. The median age was 39.0 years. For every 100 females, there were 159.3 males. For every 100 females age 18 and over, there were 104.3 males.

The median income for a household in the village was $51,250, and the median income for a family was $61,875. Males had a median income of $34,375 versus $13,125 for females. The per capita income for the village was $23,125. About 18.5% of families and 29.6% of the population were below the poverty line, including 60.9% of those under age 18 and 6.3% of those age 65 or over.
