= Soperville, Illinois =

- Unincorporated community
- Location within Illinois Location within the United States
- Coordinates: 41°00′31″N 90°23′52″W
- Country: United States
- State: Illinois
- County: Knox
- Township: Henderson
- Elevation: 771 ft (235 m)
- Time zone: UTC-6 (Central (CST))
  - Summer (DST): UTC-5 (CDT)
- Area code: 309
- GNIS feature ID: 418707

Soperville is an unincorporated community located in Knox County, Illinois. Soperville is an immigrant community with ethnicity from countries including Europe, Ireland, and Sweden.
