= Snakeden Hollow State Fish and Wildlife Area =

State park in Illinois, USA

- IUCN category IV (habitat/species management area)
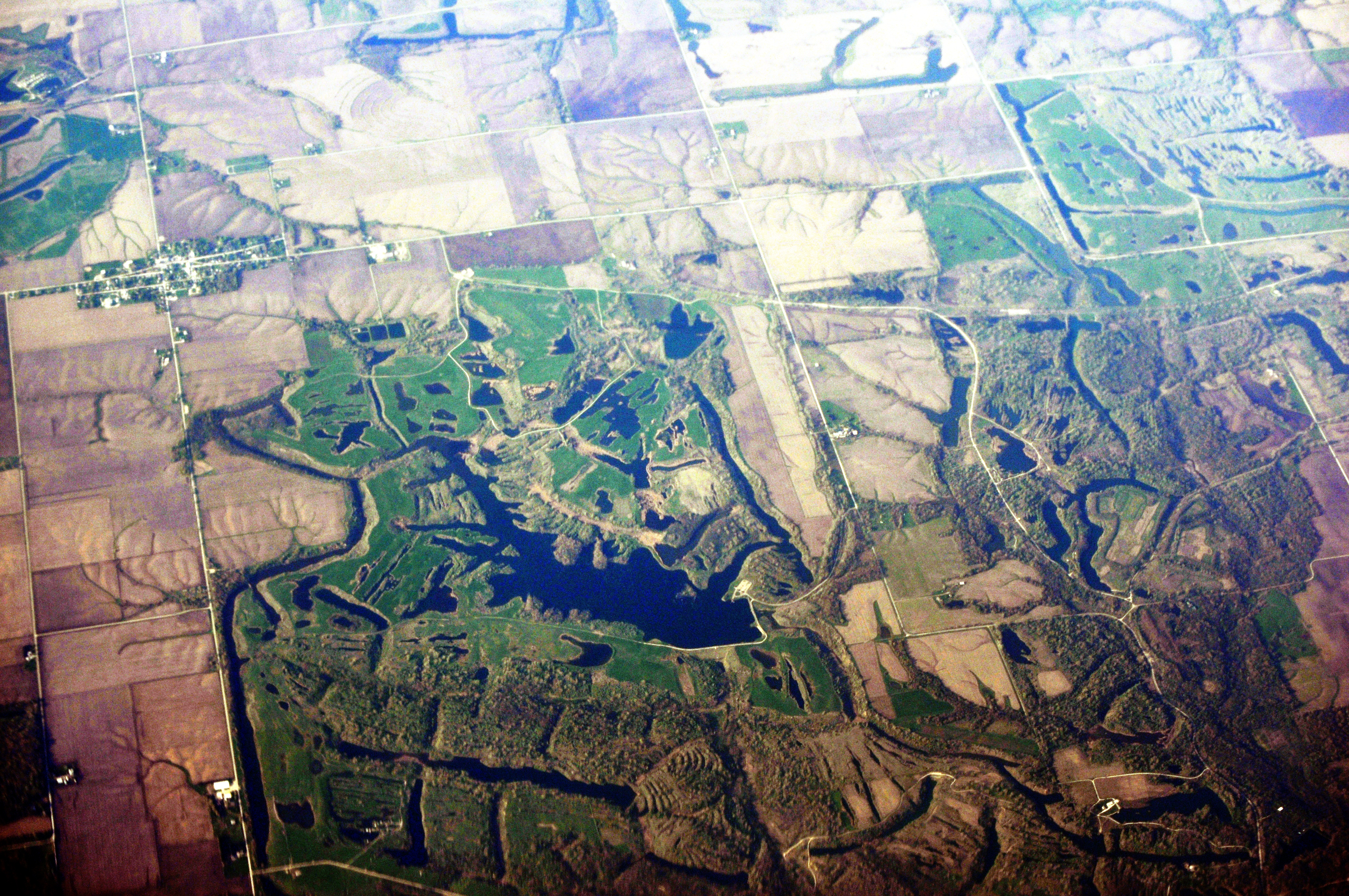
- Aerial view, April 2012.

- Location within Illinois Location within the United States
- Location: Knox County, Illinois, United States
- Nearest city: Victoria, Illinois
- Coordinates: 41°00′42″N 90°04′50″W
- Area: 2,500 acres (1,000 ha)
- Established: 1987
- Governing body: Illinois Department of Natural Resources

Snakeden Hollow State Fish and Wildlife Area is an Illinois state park on 2,500 acres (1,000 ha) in Knox County, Illinois, United States. Snakeden Hollow contains 125 water impoundments totaling 400 acres (160 ha). All lakes and ponds, except Snakeden Hollow Lake which is 160 acres (65 ha), were formed as the result of surface mining operations. The water areas currently contain largemouth and smallmouth bass, rainbow and brown trout, muskie, bluegill, redear sunfish, walleye, green sunfish, black crappie, channel catfish and bullhead. Good wildlife habitat provides a home to numerous species of mammals, birds and reptiles. A favorite nesting spot of giant Canada geese, the site has 2,100 acres (850 ha) of grassland, brushy draws, briers, shrubs, cropland and limited hardwood forest. The remaining 400 acres (160 ha) are in agricultural leases.
