= Persifer Township, Knox County, Illinois =

Persifer Township
- Township
- Location in Knox County

- Knox County's location in Illinois
- Coordinates: 40°55′59″N 90°09′20″W
- Country: United States
- State: Illinois
- County: Knox
- Established: November 2, 1852

Area
  - Total: 35.58 sq mi (92.2 km^{2})
  - Land: 34.73 sq mi (90.0 km^{2})
  - Water: 0.85 sq mi (2.2 km^{2}) 2.39%
- Elevation: 597 ft (182 m)

Population (2020)
  - Total: 1,118
  - Density: 32.19/sq mi (12.43/km^{2})
- Time zone: UTC-6 (CST)
  - Summer (DST): UTC-5 (CDT)
- ZIP codes: 61428, 61436, 61448, 61485
- FIPS code: 17-095-59221

Persifer Township is one of twenty-one townships in Knox County, Illinois, USA. As of the 2020 census, its population was 1,118 and it contained 874 housing units.

== Geography ==
According to the 2021 census gazetteer files, Persifer Township has a total area of 35.58 square miles (92.15 km^{2}), of which 34.73 square miles (89.95 km^{2}) (or 97.61%) is land and 0.85 square miles (2.20 km^{2}) (or 2.39%) is water.

=== Unincorporated towns ===
- Appleton at 40.935871°N 90.160954°W
- Dahinda at 40.92476°N 90.109007°W
- Oak Run at 40.963371°N 90.14512°W
- Trenton Corners at 40.908093°N 90.114007°W

(This list is based on USGS data and may include former settlements.)

=== Cemeteries ===
The township contains these three cemeteries: Bradford, Myers and Trenton.

== Demographics ==
As of the 2020 census there were 1,118 people, 369 households, and 270 families residing in the township. The population density was 31.43 inhabitants per square mile (12.14/km^{2}). There were 874 housing units at an average density of 24.57 per square mile (9.49/km^{2}). The racial makeup of the township was 96.60% White, 0.63% African American, 0.00% Native American, 0.18% Asian, 0.00% Pacific Islander, 0.36% from other races, and 2.24% from two or more races. Hispanic or Latino of any race were 1.16% of the population.

There were 369 households, out of which 23.60% had children under the age of 18 living with them, 69.38% were married couples living together, 3.79% had a female householder with no spouse present, and 26.83% were non-families. 19.50% of all households were made up of individuals, and 13.30% had someone living alone who was 65 years of age or older. The average household size was 2.49 and the average family size was 2.73.

The township's age distribution consisted of 20.0% under the age of 18, 8.2% from 18 to 24, 8.8% from 25 to 44, 26.8% from 45 to 64, and 36.4% who were 65 years of age or older. The median age was 55.7 years. For every 100 females, there were 81.4 males. For every 100 females age 18 and over, there were 103.3 males.

The median income for a household in the township was $61,477, and the median income for a family was $62,045. Males had a median income of $48,864 versus $29,375 for females. The per capita income for the township was $40,574. About 8.5% of families and 12.5% of the population were below the poverty line, including 10.8% of those under age 18 and 2.4% of those age 65 or over.

Historical population
Census	Pop.	Note	%±
2010	980		—
2020	1,118		14.1%
U.S. Decennial Census

== School districts ==
- Knoxville Community Unit School District 202
- Williamsfield Community Unit School District 210

== Political districts ==
- Illinois's 18th congressional district
- State House District 74
- State Senate District 37
