= Trenton Corners, Illinois =

- Unincorporated community
- Location within Illinois Location within the United States
- Coordinates: 40°55′29″N 90°06′32″W
- Country: United States
- State: Illinois
- County: Knox
- Township: Persifer
- Elevation: 584 ft (178 m)
- Time zone: UTC-6 (CST)
  - Summer (DST): UTC-5 (CDT)
- Area code: 309

Trenton Corners is an unincorporated community in Persifer Township, Knox County, Illinois. Trenton Corners is just west of the Spoon River at the intersection of U.S. Highway 150 and Knox County Highway 15.

There was formerly an early settlers' town called Trenton. The new Town of Trenton was surveyed on 30 July 1839 by George A. Charles, County Surveyor of Knox County, IL, for Hiram Bowman, Proprietor and a Minister of Gospel. It contained 160 acres, and was located in the NW Quarter, Section 25, Township 11N, Range 3E, 4th Principal Meridian, as granted by US Land Patent #14379 to Bowman on 3 November 1840. The small town consisted of 16 blocks divided into 113 lots, with 9 named streets, plus a public square. On 5 December 1839, Anselm Goodman, previously of Hart County, Kentucky and Lawrence County, IL, was appointed as its Postmaster, and on 16 December, he purchased eight of the 16 blocks, plus Lot 10 of Block 5, of the new town from Hiram Bowman. From 1839 to early 1850s, Bowman and Goodman sold lots to new residents. In 1842, Goodman and his wife Nancy sold Lot 5 in Block 4 for $1 to the Trustees of School District No. Three for new school.

In 1888, the Santa Fe Railway located north of the town. The businesses and the population of the town moved closer to the railroad into the new town of Dahinda, and Trenton ceased to be a place of importance. Several small businesses were still located in Trenton Corners until recently but none remain today. The Persifer Township hall and maintenance facility and the Trenton Cemetery are located near Trenton Corners.
