= Elba Township, Knox County, Illinois =

Elba Township
- Township
- Location in Knox County

- Knox County's location in Illinois
- Coordinates: 40°50′21″N 90°02′45″W
- Country: United States
- State: Illinois
- County: Knox
- Established: November 2, 1852

Area
  - Total: 36.34 sq mi (94.1 km^{2})
  - Land: 36.34 sq mi (94.1 km^{2})
  - Water: 0.00 sq mi (0 km^{2}) 0.01%
- Elevation: 676 ft (206 m)

Population (2020)
  - Total: 248
  - Density: 6.82/sq mi (2.63/km^{2})
- Time zone: UTC-6 (CST)
  - Summer (DST): UTC-5 (CDT)
- ZIP codes: 61428, 61436, 61458, 61489, 61529, 61572
- FIPS code: 17-095-22879

Elba Township is one of twenty-one townships in Knox County, Illinois, USA. As of the 2020 census, its population was 248 and it contained 117 housing units. Its name was changed from Liberty Township on June 8, 1853.

== Geography ==
According to the 2021 census gazetteer files, Elba Township has a total area of 36.34 square miles (94.12 km^{2}), of which 36.34 square miles (94.12 km^{2}) (or 99.99%) is land and 0.00 square miles (0.00 km^{2}) (or 0.01%) is water.

=== Unincorporated towns ===
- Elba Center at 40.844204°N 90.043171°W
- Eugene at 40.887537°N 90.014281°W

(This list is based on USGS data and may include former settlements.)

=== Cemeteries ===
The township contains these four cemeteries: Catterton, Elba, Kightlinger and Pleasant Hill.

== Demographics ==
As of the 2020 census there were 248 people, 93 households, and 53 families residing in the township. The population density was 6.82 inhabitants per square mile (2.63/km^{2}). There were 117 housing units at an average density of 3.22 per square mile (1.24/km^{2}). The racial makeup of the township was 97.98% White, 0.00% African American, 0.00% Native American, 0.00% Asian, 0.00% Pacific Islander, 0.00% from other races, and 2.02% from two or more races. Hispanic or Latino of any race were 0.40% of the population.

There were 93 households, out of which 21.50% had children under the age of 18 living with them, 39.78% were married couples living together, 17.20% had a female householder with no spouse present, and 43.01% were non-families. 3.20% of all households were made up of individuals, and 3.20% had someone living alone who was 65 years of age or older. The average household size was 2.26 and the average family size was 2.34.

The township's age distribution consisted of 8.6% under the age of 18, 15.7% from 18 to 24, 41.9% from 25 to 44, 19.1% from 45 to 64, and 14.8% who were 65 years of age or older. The median age was 43.2 years. For every 100 females, there were 96.3 males. For every 100 females age 18 and over, there were 97.9 males.

The median income for a family in the township was $90,938. Males had a median income of $35,156 versus $19,519 for females. The per capita income for the township was $22,590. About 17.0% of families and 41.0% of the population were below the poverty line, including 44.4% of those under age 18 and none of those age 65 or over.

Historical population
Census	Pop.	Note	%±
2010	291		—
2020	248		−14.8%
U.S. Decennial Census

== School districts ==
- Farmington Central Community Unit School District 265
- Williamsfield Community Unit School District 210

== Political districts ==
- Illinois's 17th congressional district
- State House District 74
- State Senate District 37
