= Elba Center, Illinois =

- Unincorporated community
- Location within Illinois Location within the United States
- Coordinates: 40°50′39″N 90°02′35″W
- Country: United States
- State: Illinois
- County: Knox
- Township: Elba
- Elevation: 709 ft (216 m)
- Time zone: UTC-6 (Central (CST))
  - Summer (DST): UTC-5 (CDT)
- Area code: 309
- GNIS feature ID: 422660

Elba Center is an unincorporated community located in Knox County, Illinois.
