= Chestnut Township, Knox County, Illinois =

Chestnut Township
- Township
- Location in Knox County

- Knox County's location in Illinois
- Coordinates: 40°45′12″N 90°16′27″W
- Country: United States
- State: Illinois
- County: Knox
- Established: November 2, 1852

Area
  - Total: 36.19 sq mi (93.7 km^{2})
  - Land: 36.19 sq mi (93.7 km^{2})
  - Water: 0.00 sq mi (0 km^{2}) 0.01%
- Elevation: 676 ft (206 m)

Population (2020)
  - Total: 216
  - Density: 5.97/sq mi (2.30/km^{2})
- Time zone: UTC-6 (CST)
  - Summer (DST): UTC-5 (CDT)
- ZIP codes: 61410, 61436, 61458, 61474, 61544
- FIPS code: 17-095-13217

Chestnut Township is one of twenty-one townships in Knox County, Illinois, United States. As of the 2020 census, its population was 216 and it contained 117 housing units.

== Geography ==
According to the 2021 census gazetteer files, Chestnut Township has a total area of 36.19 square miles (93.73 km^{2}), of which 36.19 square miles (93.73 km^{2}) (or 99.99%) is land and 0.00 square miles (0.00 km^{2}) (or 0.01%) is water.

=== Cities, towns, villages ===
- London Mills (northeast quarter)

=== Unincorporated towns ===
- Hermon at 40.756983°N 90.319848°W

(This list is based on USGS data and may include former settlements.)

=== Extinct towns ===
- Bridgeport at 40.743372°N 90.237068°W
- Burnside at 40.769483°N 90.273458°W

(These towns are listed as "historical" by the USGS.)

=== Cemeteries ===
The township contains these four cemeteries: Elias Bragg, Harper, Hermon Christian and Hermon Methodist.

=== Airports and landing strips ===
- Davies Landing Strip

== Demographics ==
As of the 2020 census there were 216 people, 63 households, and 52 families residing in the township. The population density was 5.97 inhabitants per square mile (2.31/km^{2}). There were 117 housing units at an average density of 3.23 per square mile (1.25/km^{2}). The racial makeup of the township was 94.91% White, 0.46% African American, 0.46% Native American, 0.46% Asian, 0.46% Pacific Islander, 0.46% from other races, and 2.78% from two or more races. Hispanic or Latino of any race were 1.39% of the population.

There were 63 households, out of which 6.30% had children under the age of 18 living with them, 82.54% were married couples living together, 0.00% had a female householder with no spouse present, and 17.46% were non-families. 17.50% of all households were made up of individuals, and 9.50% had someone living alone who was 65 years of age or older. The average household size was 2.03 and the average family size was 2.25.

The township's age distribution consisted of 10.9% under the age of 18, 0.0% from 18 to 24, 43.7% from 25 to 44, 17.2% from 45 to 64, and 28.1% who were 65 years of age or older. The median age was 44.3 years. For every 100 females, there were 88.2 males. For every 100 females age 18 and over, there were 96.6 males.

The median income for a household in the township was $56,875, and the median income for a family was $68,750. Males had a median income of $36,719 versus $41,667 for females. The per capita income for the township was $26,291. About 9.6% of families and 11.7% of the population were below the poverty line, including none of those under age 18 and 27.8% of those age 65 or over.

Historical population
Census	Pop.	Note	%±
2010	253		—
2020	216		−14.6%
U.S. Decennial Census

== School districts ==
- Abingdon Community Unit School District 217
- Knoxville Community Unit School District 202
- Spoon River Valley Community Unit School District 4

== Political districts ==
- Illinois's 17th congressional district
- State House District 74
- State Senate District 37
