= Henderson Grove, Illinois =

- Unincorporated community
- Location within Illinois Location within the United States
- Coordinates: 41°01′11″N 90°24′41″W
- Country: United States
- State: Illinois
- County: Knox
- Township: Henderson
- Elevation: 755 ft (230 m)
- Time zone: UTC-6 (Central (CST))
  - Summer (DST): UTC-5 (CDT)
- Area code: 309
- GNIS feature ID: 410050

Henderson Grove is an unincorporated community in Henderson Township, Knox County, Illinois, United States. Henderson Grove is located on County Route 37, 5.4 miles (8.7 km) north-northwest of Galesburg.
