= Cedar Township, Knox County, Illinois =

Cedar Township
- Township
- Location in Knox County

- Knox County's location in Illinois
- Coordinates: 40°50′37″N 90°23′24″W
- Country: United States
- State: Illinois
- County: Knox
- Established: November 2, 1852

Area
  - Total: 36.22 sq mi (93.8 km^{2})
  - Land: 36.01 sq mi (93.3 km^{2})
  - Water: 0.22 sq mi (0.57 km^{2}) 0.60%
- Elevation: 750 ft (230 m)

Population (2020)
  - Total: 3,047
  - Density: 84.62/sq mi (32.67/km^{2})
- Time zone: UTC-6 (CST)
  - Summer (DST): UTC-5 (CDT)
- ZIP codes: 61401, 61410, 61436
- FIPS code: 17-095-11891

Cedar Township is one of twenty-one townships in Knox County, Illinois, USA. As of the 2020 census, its population was 3,047 and it contained 1,481 housing units. Its name was changed from Cherry Grove Township on June 8, 1853.

== Geography ==
According to the 2021 census gazetteer files, Cedar Township has a total area of 36.22 square miles (93.81 km^{2}), of which 36.01 square miles (93.27 km^{2}) (or 99.40%) is land and 0.22 square miles (0.57 km^{2}) (or 0.60%) is water.

=== Cities, towns, villages ===
- Abingdon (north three-quarters)

=== Unincorporated towns ===
- Saluda at 40.871983°N 90.394296°W

(This list is based on USGS data and may include former settlements.)

=== Cemeteries ===
The township contains these three cemeteries: Abingdon, Brush Creek and Cherry Grove.

=== Airports and landing strips ===
- Malone Landing Strip

== Demographics ==
As of the 2020 census there were 3,047 people, 1,351 households, and 784 families residing in the township. The population density was 84.12 inhabitants per square mile (32.48/km^{2}). There were 1,481 housing units at an average density of 40.89 per square mile (15.79/km^{2}). The racial makeup of the township was 93.14% White, 0.89% African American, 0.10% Native American, 0.36% Asian, 0.10% Pacific Islander, 0.62% from other races, and 4.79% from two or more races. Hispanic or Latino of any race were 2.36% of the population.

There were 1,351 households, out of which 20.00% had children under the age of 18 living with them, 48.48% were married couples living together, 7.03% had a female householder with no spouse present, and 41.97% were non-families. 32.80% of all households were made up of individuals, and 20.00% had someone living alone who was 65 years of age or older. The average household size was 2.24 and the average family size was 2.80.

The township's age distribution consisted of 17.2% under the age of 18, 8.8% from 18 to 24, 22.4% from 25 to 44, 28.7% from 45 to 64, and 22.8% who were 65 years of age or older. The median age was 45.8 years. For every 100 females, there were 105.9 males. For every 100 females age 18 and over, there were 100.8 males.

The median income for a household in the township was $54,682, and the median income for a family was $75,962. Males had a median income of $42,065 versus $27,333 for females. The per capita income for the township was $28,894. About 3.8% of families and 13.1% of the population were below the poverty line, including 8.7% of those under age 18 and 5.5% of those age 65 or over.

Historical population
Census	Pop.	Note	%±
2010	3,270		—
2020	3,047		−6.8%
U.S. Decennial Census

== School districts ==
- Abingdon Community Unit School District 217
- Galesburg Community Unit School District 205
- Knoxville Community Unit School District 202

== Political districts ==
- Illinois's 17th congressional district
- State House District 74
- State Senate District 37
