= Truro, Illinois =

- Unincorporated community
- Location within Illinois Location within the United States
- Coordinates: 40°57′27″N 90°02′32″W
- Country: United States
- State: Illinois
- County: Knox
- Township: Truro
- Elevation: 682 ft (208 m)
- Time zone: UTC-6 (Central (CST))
  - Summer (DST): UTC-5 (CDT)
- Area code: 309
- GNIS feature ID: 423255

Truro is an unincorporated community in Knox County, Illinois. Truro is a populated place located within the Township of Truro, a minor civil division (MCD) of Knox County. The elevation of Truro is 682 feet. Knox County is in the Central Time Zone (UTC -6 hours). The population in Truro is 738. There are 21 people per square mile aka population density. The median age in Truro is 37.5, the US median age is 37.4. The number of people per household in Truro is 2.6, the US average of people per household is 2.6.

== Family in Truro ==
- 57.2% are married - 7.8% are divorced - 26.9% are married with children - 21.8% have children, but are single

== Race in Truro ==
- 97.4% are white

- 0.3% are black

- 0.0% are asian

- 0.0% are native american

- 0.0% claim Other

- 2.2% claim Hispanic Ethnicity

- 0.1% Two or More Races

- 0.0% Hawaiian, Pacific Islander
