= Orange Township, Knox County, Illinois =

Orange Township
- Township
- Location in Knox County

- Knox County's location in Illinois
- Coordinates: 40°50′25″N 90°16′40″W
- Country: United States
- State: Illinois
- County: Knox
- Established: November 2, 1852

Government
  - Road Commissioner: Beth Bragg

Area
  - Total: 36.18 sq mi (93.7 km^{2})
  - Land: 36.17 sq mi (93.7 km^{2})
  - Water: 0.02 sq mi (0.052 km^{2}) 0.04%
- Elevation: 709 ft (216 m)

Population (2020)
  - Total: 530
  - Density: 15/sq mi (5.7/km^{2})
- Time zone: UTC-6 (CST)
  - Summer (DST): UTC-5 (CDT)
- ZIP codes: 61410, 61436, 61448, 61458
- FIPS code: 17-095-56315

Orange Township is one of twenty-one townships in Knox County, Illinois, United States. As of the 2020 census, its population was 530 and it contained 240 housing units.

== Geography ==
According to the 2021 census gazetteer files, Orange Township has a total area of 36.18 square miles (93.71 km^{2}), of which 36.17 square miles (93.68 km^{2}) (or 99.96%) is land and 0.02 square miles (0.05 km^{2}) (or 0.04%) is water.

=== Unincorporated towns ===
- DeLong at 40.816705°N 90.304570°W

(This list is based on USGS data and may include former settlements.)

=== Cemeteries ===
The township contains these five cemeteries: Cook, Ferguson, Haynes, Maxey-Mathers and McCallister.

=== Lakes ===
- Horseshoe Lake

== Demographics ==
As of the 2020 census there were 530 people, 219 households, and 174 families residing in the township. The population density was 14.65 inhabitants per square mile (5.66/km^{2}). There were 240 housing units at an average density of 6.63 per square mile (2.56/km^{2}). The racial makeup of the township was 94.72% White, 1.32% African American, 0.38% Native American, 0.00% Asian, 0.00% Pacific Islander, 0.38% from other races, and 3.21% from two or more races. Hispanic or Latino of any race were 0.57% of the population.

There were 219 households, out of which 22.80% had children under the age of 18 living with them, 77.17% were married couples living together, 2.28% had a female householder with no spouse present, and 20.55% were non-families. 18.70% of all households were made up of individuals, and 9.60% had someone living alone who was 65 years of age or older. The average household size was 2.42 and the average family size was 2.76.

The township's age distribution consisted of 15.8% under the age of 18, 2.8% from 18 to 24, 12.1% from 25 to 44, 48.3% from 45 to 64, and 20.9% who were 65 years of age or older. The median age was 56.9 years. For every 100 females, there were 93.4 males. For every 100 females age 18 and over, there were 89.0 males.

The median income for a household in the township was $73,079, and the median income for a family was $74,146. Males had a median income of $71,087 versus $40,417 for females. The per capita income for the township was $33,609. About 4.0% of families and 8.3% of the population were below the poverty line, including 20.2% of those under age 18 and 0.0% of those age 65 or over.

Historical population
Census	Pop.	Note	%±
2010	556		—
2020	530		−4.7%
U.S. Decennial Census

== School districts ==
- Abingdon Community Unit School District 217
- Galesburg Community Unit School District 205
- Knoxville Community Unit School District 202

== Political districts ==
- Illinois's 17th congressional district
- State House District 74
- State Senate District 37
