= Dahinda, Illinois =

Settlement in Knox County, Illinois

- Unincorporated community
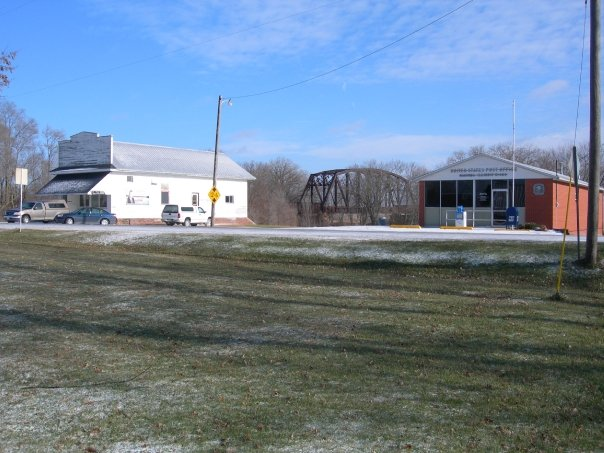
- Store and post office in Dahinda with BNSF Railway steel bridge in background

- Location of Dahinda within Illinois Dahinda (the United States)
- Coordinates: 40°55′29″N 90°06′32″W
- Country: United States
- State: Illinois
- County: Knox
- Township: Persifer
- Elevation: 584 ft (178 m)
- Time zone: UTC-6 (CST)
  - Summer (DST): UTC-5 (CDT)
- ZIP code: 61428
- Area code: 309

Dahinda is an unincorporated community in Knox County, Illinois, United States. It is part of the Galesburg Micropolitan Statistical Area. Dahinda is in Persifer Township and lies approximately one mile north of U.S. Highway 150 and Interstate 74. Knox County Highway 15 runs from north to south through Dahinda. Once a bustling town, as time has gone on, the businesses in this community moved on, but the community still continues to exist.

== History ==
From the 1899 Historical Encyclopedia of Illinois, W. Seldon Gale & Geo. Candee Gale published by Munsell Publishing Company, Publishers, Chicago & New York:

"This place was laid out in the summer of 1888, by the Santa Fe Town and Land Company. It is held in the name of the president of that company and contains 47.74 acres. It stands on the northwest quarter of Section 24. It contains a freight and express office, two stores, a blacksmith shop, a grain elevator, and twenty-five dwellings, one of which is a boarding house. The railroad has a pump house and tank, and a fine bridge over Spoon River. R. J. Bedford is the village doctor and William G. Sargeant is postmaster and notary. There is a good school house, and a building of The Reorganized Church of Jesus Christ of Latter Day Saints (since renamed the Community of Christ). D. C. Smith is the minister and leading man of this organization."

(D. C. Smith referenced above would be Don Carlos Smith, one of the sons of Joseph Smith)

== Origin of the Name "Dahinda" ==
The name "Dahinda" comes from the 1855 edition of The Song of Hiawatha. by Henry Wadsworth Longfellow. "All the air was white with moonlight, All the water black with shadow, And around him the Suggema, The mosquito, sang his war-song, And the fire-flies, Wah-wah-taysee, Waved their torches to mislead him; And the bull-frog, the Dahinda, thrust his head into the moonlight, Fixed his yellow eyes upon him, Sobbed and sank beneath the surface." According to local lore the construction workers for the Atchison, Topeka & Santa Fe Railway were trying to sleep in their tents at the site where Dahinda now stands. They were kept awake by the sound of bullfrogs and chose "Dahinda" as the name for the village.

== Today ==
As of 2010, the town has a post office, fire station, several houses, the Barn Bed and Breakfast, and the Dahinda United Methodist Church. The Dahinda General Store, a small shop which originally opened in 1916, reopened in 2018. The BNSF Railway runs east and west through Dahinda. The BNSF Railway bridge over the Spoon River is a steel bridge built in 1908. A pipeline runs under Dahinda, along the tracks of the BNSF. The pipeline was originally owned by the Prairie State Oil Company, later by Sinclair Oil Corporation, and today is owned by BP. A former pumping station for the pipeline still stands in Dahinda. A large smokestack for the pumping station can be seen for miles in the Court Creek Valley, and is a focal point for the town. Oak Run, a resort community and golf course located on Spoon Lake is located in Dahinda.

== Geography ==
The town sits on the west bank of the Spoon River in a low valley with hills surrounding the town to the north and south. Mike Svob, in his book Paddling Illinois, featured the Spoon River portion from Dahinda to Maquon as one of the "64 great trips by canoe and kayak" in Illinois. Court Creek comes in from the west and flows into the Spoon River in Dahinda. Dahinda is prone to many floods from both Court Creek and the Spoon River. Besides some amount of timber, the area surrounding Dahinda is an agricultural area with corn and soybeans as major crops.

== Notable person ==
- Jack E. Walker, Illinois politician, was born in Dahinda.
