= Victoria Township, Knox County, Illinois =

Victoria Township
- Township
- Location in Knox County

- Knox County's location in Illinois
- Coordinates: 41°01′19″N 90°02′21″W
- Country: United States
- State: Illinois
- County: Knox
- Established: November 2, 1852

Area
  - Total: 35.52 sq mi (92.0 km^{2})
  - Land: 35.00 sq mi (90.6 km^{2})
  - Water: 0.52 sq mi (1.3 km^{2}) 1.45%
- Elevation: 761 ft (232 m)

Population (2020)
  - Total: 365
  - Density: 10.4/sq mi (4.03/km^{2})
- Time zone: UTC-6 (CST)
  - Summer (DST): UTC-5 (CDT)
- ZIP codes: 61449, 61485, 61489
- FIPS code: 17-095-77824

Victoria Township is one of twenty-one townships in Knox County, Illinois, USA. As of the 2020 census, its population was 365 and it contained 177 housing units.

== Geography ==
According to the 2021 census gazetteer files, Victoria Township has a total area of 35.52 square miles (92.00 km^{2}), of which 35.00 square miles (90.65 km^{2}) (or 98.55%) is land and 0.52 square miles (1.35 km^{2}) (or 1.45%) is water.

=== Cities, towns, villages ===
- Victoria (east half)

=== Cemeteries ===
The township contains these five cemeteries: Center Prairie, Etherly, Garret, Salem and Victoria.

=== Lakes ===
- Lone Rock Lake
- Lost Lake
- Old Garage Lake
- T Lake

== Demographics ==
As of the 2020 census there were 365 people, 156 households, and 98 families residing in the township. The population density was 10.28 inhabitants per square mile (3.97/km^{2}). There were 177 housing units at an average density of 4.98 per square mile (1.92/km^{2}). The racial makeup of the township was 95.07% White, 0.00% African American, 0.00% Native American, 0.27% Asian, 0.00% Pacific Islander, 0.55% from other races, and 4.11% from two or more races. Hispanic or Latino of any race were 1.64% of the population.

There were 156 households, out of which 14.10% had children under the age of 18 living with them, 49.36% were married couples living together, 8.97% had a female householder with no spouse present, and 37.18% were non-families. 30.10% of all households were made up of individuals, and 14.10% had someone living alone who was 65 years of age or older. The average household size was 2.16 and the average family size was 2.72.

The township's age distribution consisted of 17.8% under the age of 18, 6.8% from 18 to 24, 19% from 25 to 44, 22.6% from 45 to 64, and 33.8% who were 65 years of age or older. The median age was 53.1 years. For every 100 females, there were 106.7 males. For every 100 females age 18 and over, there were 108.3 males.

The median income for a household in the township was $50,833, and the median income for a family was $51,528. Males had a median income of $41,250 versus $26,563 for females. The per capita income for the township was $24,625. About 14.3% of families and 12.2% of the population were below the poverty line, including 6.7% of those under age 18 and 7.9% of those age 65 or over.

Historical population
Census	Pop.	Note	%±
2010	379		—
2020	365		−3.7%
U.S. Decennial Census

== School districts ==
- R.O.W.V.A. Community Unit School District 208
- Williamsfield Community Unit School District 210

== Political districts ==
- Illinois's 18th congressional district
- State House District 74
- State Senate District 37
