= Abingdon, Illinois =

- City
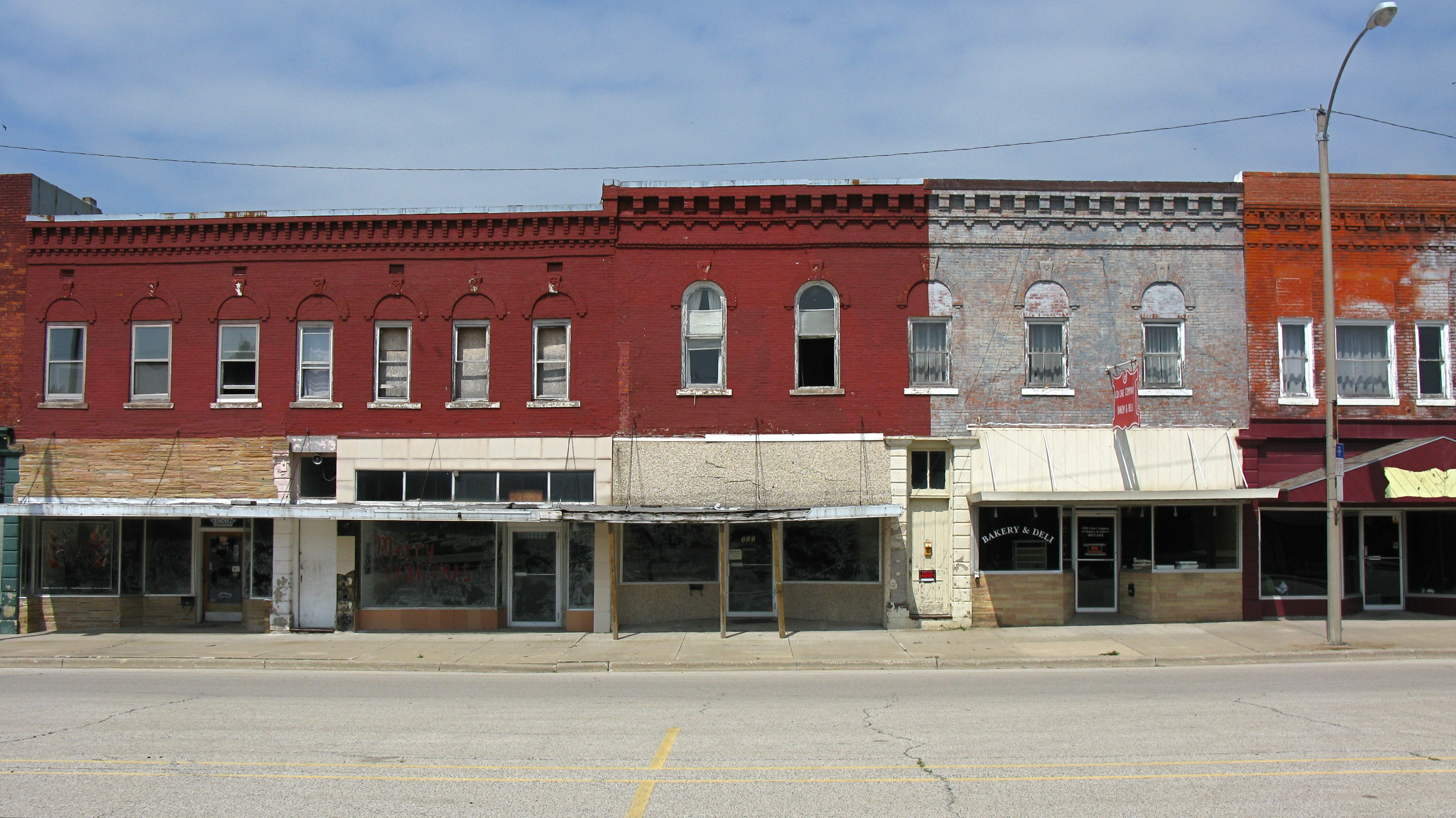
- Closed businesses in downtown Abingdon (2009)

- Seal

- Location of Abingdon in Knox County, Illinois
- Interactive map of Abingdon, Illinois
- Coordinates: 40°48′14″N 90°24′03″W
- Country: United States
- State: Illinois
- County: Knox
- Townships: Cedar; Indian Point
- Incorporated: 1857
- Founder: Abraham Davis Swarts
- Named for: Abingdon, Maryland

Area
  - Total: 1.42 sq mi (3.69 km^{2})
  - Land: 1.42 sq mi (3.69 km^{2})
  - Water: 0 sq mi (0.00 km^{2})
- Elevation: 751 ft (229 m)

Population (2020)
  - Total: 2,951
  - Density: 2,071.4/sq mi (799.77/km^{2})
- Time zone: UTC-6 (Central (CST))
  - Summer (DST): UTC-5 (CDT)
- ZIP code: 61410
- Area code(s): 309, 861
- FIPS code: 17-00113
- GNIS feature ID: 2393876

The City of Abingdon is a city in Knox County, Illinois, United States. The city is 50 miles (80 km) west of Peoria. The population was 2,951 as of the 2020 census.

== History ==
The city was first settled in 1828. Abingdon was laid out in 1836 and was named after Abingdon, Maryland, the birthplace of its founder, Abraham Davis Swarts. It was incorporated in 1857.

In 1894 William C. Hooker of Abingdon applied for a patent on a common spring-loaded mousetrap. In June of 1907 the patent was awarded to William C. Hooker, William Armstrong, and Knox Mark.

== Geography ==
Abingdon is located in southwestern Knox County. Illinois Route 41 passes through the center of the city, leading north 11 miles (18 km) to Galesburg, the county seat, and south 20 miles (32 km) to Bushnell.

According to the 2021 census gazetteer files, Abingdon has a total area of 1.43 square miles (3.70 km^{2}), all land.

== Demographics ==
Historical population
Census	Pop.	Note	%±
1850	210		—
1860	1,032		391.4%
1870	1,700		64.7%
1880	1,511		−11.1%
1890	1,321		−12.6%
1900	2,022		53.1%
1910	2,464		21.9%
1920	2,721		10.4%
1930	2,771		1.8%
1940	3,218		16.1%
1950	3,300		2.5%
1960	3,469		5.1%
1970	3,936		13.5%
1980	4,210		7.0%
1990	3,597		−14.6%
2000	3,612		0.4%
2010	3,319		−8.1%
2020	2,951		−11.1%
U.S. Decennial Census

Abingdon is part of the Galesburg Micropolitan Statistical Area.

=== 2020 census ===
As of the 2020 census, Abingdon had a population of 2,951. The population density was 2,070.88 inhabitants per square mile (799.57/km^{2}). The median age was 40.6 years. 24.0% of residents were under the age of 18 and 18.5% of residents were 65 years of age or older. For every 100 females there were 94.0 males, and for every 100 females age 18 and over there were 89.8 males age 18 and over.

0.0% of residents lived in urban areas, while 100.0% lived in rural areas.

There were 1,258 households and 810 families in Abingdon. Of all households, 31.4% had children under the age of 18 living in them, 41.7% were married-couple households, 18.8% were households with a male householder and no spouse or partner present, and 29.7% were households with a female householder and no spouse or partner present. About 30.6% of all households were made up of individuals and 16.6% had someone living alone who was 65 years of age or older.

There were 1,409 housing units at an average density of 988.77 per square mile (381.77/km^{2}). Of these units, 10.7% were vacant. The homeowner vacancy rate was 3.6% and the rental vacancy rate was 8.0%.

Racial composition as of the 2020 census
Race	Number	Percent
White	2,732	92.6%
Black or African American	41	1.4%
American Indian and Alaska Native	4	0.1%
Asian	9	0.3%
Native Hawaiian and Other Pacific Islander	1	0.0%
Some other race	19	0.6%
Two or more races	145	4.9%
Hispanic or Latino (of any race)	91	3.1%

=== Income and poverty ===
The median income for a household in the city was $43,171, and the median income for a family was $56,146. Males had a median income of $31,750 versus $25,986 for females. The per capita income for the city was $20,530. About 12.5% of families and 19.7% of the population were below the poverty line, including 21.1% of those under age 18 and 5.9% of those age 65 or over.

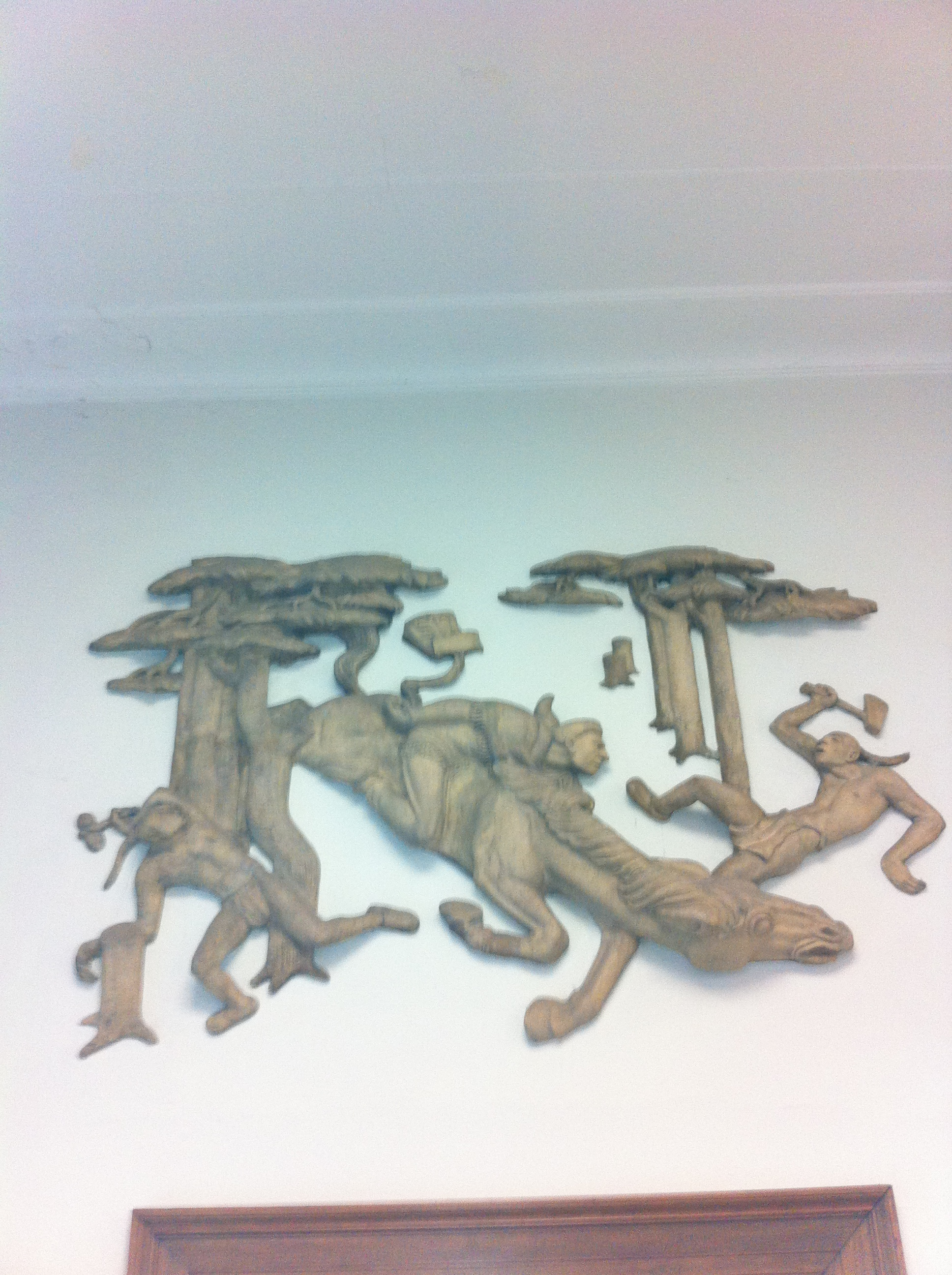
A terra-cotta relief, The Post Rider, by Hillis Arnold of Godfrey, Illinois, is displayed in the Abingdon Post Office.

== Education ==
Until July 1, 2013, Abingdon's school district included Hedding Grade School, Abingdon Middle School, and Abingdon High School.

In November 2012 voters approved a school consolidation with Avon. Beginning July 1, 2013, the district became known as Abingdon-Avon CUSD #276. Abingdon is home to Hedding Grade School, which is a PK - 4 attendance center, and Abingdon-Avon High School. Avon also houses a PK - 2 elementary school and Abingdon-Avon Middle School, which serves students in grades 5 - 8.

Abingdon-Avon CUSD #276 serves nearly 1,000 students.

The high school enrollment is 289 students. The students selected "Tornadoes" as the mascot and black, green, and yellow as the school colors.

Hedding College (1855–1930) was named after Methodist Bishop Elizah Hedding. The school merged with Illinois Wesleyan University in 1930.

== Notable people ==
- Robert Hugo Dunlap, captain and commanding officer, C Company, Iwo Jima; recipient of Medal of Honor, was born in Abingdon.
- James Stockdale, admiral in the U.S. Navy, recipient of Medal of Honor. Naval aviator, test pilot, Vietnam prisoner of war leader. He was also Ross Perot's running mate in the 1992 United States presidential election.
