= East Galesburg, Illinois =

East Galesburg
- Village
- Location of East Galesburg in Knox County, Illinois.
- Coordinates: 40°56′34″N 90°18′39″W
- Country: United States
- State: Illinois
- County: Knox
- Township: Knox

Area
  - Total: 1.42 sq mi (3.67 km^{2})
  - Land: 1.37 sq mi (3.54 km^{2})
  - Water: 0.050 sq mi (0.13 km^{2})
- Elevation: 725 ft (221 m)

Population (2020)
  - Total: 763
  - Density: 558.8/sq mi (215.77/km^{2})
- Time zone: UTC-6 (CST)
  - Summer (DST): UTC-5 (CDT)
- ZIP code: 61430
- Area code: 309
- FIPS code: 17-21826
- GNIS feature ID: 2398775

East Galesburg is a village in Knox County, Illinois, United States. The population was 763 as of the 2020 census. It is part of the Galesburg Micropolitan Statistical Area.

== Geography ==
According to the 2021 census gazetteer files, East Galesburg has a total area of 1.42 square miles (3.68 km^{2}), of which 1.37 square miles (3.55 km^{2}) (or 96.47%) is land and 0.05 square miles (0.13 km^{2}) (or 3.53%) is water.

== Demographics ==
Historical population
Census	Pop.	Note	%±
1900	663		—
1910	753		13.6%
1920	566		−24.8%
1930	587		3.7%
1940	605		3.1%
1950	651		7.6%
1960	660		1.4%
1970	706		7.0%
1980	928		31.4%
1990	813		−12.4%
2000	839		3.2%
2010	812		−3.2%
2020	763		−6.0%
U.S. Decennial Census

As of the 2020 census there were 763 people, 289 households, and 161 families residing in the village. The population density was 539.22 inhabitants per square mile (208.19/km^{2}). There were 362 housing units at an average density of 255.83 per square mile (98.78/km^{2}). The racial makeup of the village was 90.04% White, 0.92% African American, 0.00% Native American, 2.10% Asian, 0.00% Pacific Islander, 1.97% from other races, and 4.98% from two or more races. Hispanic or Latino of any race were 4.59% of the population.

There were 289 households, out of which 20.8% had children under the age of 18 living with them, 46.71% were married couples living together, 3.81% had a female householder with no husband present, and 44.29% were non-families. 37.37% of all households were made up of individuals, and 19.38% had someone living alone who was 65 years of age or older. The average household size was 2.55 and the average family size was 2.00.

The village's age distribution consisted of 15.7% under the age of 18, 4.5% from 18 to 24, 21.6% from 25 to 44, 32.5% from 45 to 64, and 25.7% who were 65 years of age or older. The median age was 52.9 years. For every 100 females, there were 104.6 males. For every 100 females age 18 and over, there were 97.6 males.

The median income for a household in the village was $57,708, and the median income for a family was $71,375. Males had a median income of $45,625 versus $33,942 for females. The per capita income for the village was $38,414. About 5.6% of families and 10.0% of the population were below the poverty line, including 9.9% of those under age 18 and 1.3% of those age 65 or over.
