= Knox Township, Knox County, Illinois =

Knox Township
- Township
- Location in Knox County

- Knox County's location in Illinois
- Coordinates: 40°56′05″N 90°16′32″W
- Country: United States
- State: Illinois
- County: Knox
- Established: November 2, 1852

Government
  - Road Commissioner: Mark Boyer

Area
  - Total: 35.53 sq mi (92.0 km^{2})
  - Land: 35.41 sq mi (91.7 km^{2})
  - Water: 0.12 sq mi (0.31 km^{2}) 0.33%
- Elevation: 735 ft (224 m)

Population (2020)
  - Total: 4,922
  - Density: 139.0/sq mi (53.67/km^{2})
- Time zone: UTC-6 (CST)
  - Summer (DST): UTC-5 (CDT)
- ZIP codes: 61401, 61430, 61436, 61448
- FIPS code: 17-095-40403

Knox Township is one of twenty-one townships in Knox County, Illinois, United States. As of the 2020 census, its population was 4,922 and it contained 2,221 housing units.

== Geography ==
According to the 2021 census gazetteer files, Knox Township has a total area of 35.53 square miles (92.02 km^{2}), of which 35.41 square miles (91.71 km^{2}) (or 99.67%) is land and 0.12 square miles (0.31 km^{2}) (or 0.33%) is water.

=== Cities, towns, villages ===
- East Galesburg
- Knoxville

=== Unincorporated communities ===
- Knox

=== Cemeteries ===
The township contains these seven cemeteries: Alms House, Butterfield Family, Knoxville, Saint Marys, Swedish, Union and Van Gilder.

== Demographics ==
As of the 2020 census there were 4,922 people, 1,814 households, and 1,188 families residing in the township. The population density was 138.54 inhabitants per square mile (53.49/km^{2}). There were 2,221 housing units at an average density of 62.51 per square mile (24.14/km^{2}). The racial makeup of the township was 93.23% White, 0.73% African American, 0.12% Native American, 0.47% Asian, 0.00% Pacific Islander, 0.71% from other races, and 4.73% from two or more races. Hispanic or Latino of any race were 3.03% of the population.

There were 1,814 households, out of which 34.50% had children under the age of 18 living with them, 50.44% were married couples living together, 10.53% had a female householder with no spouse present, and 34.51% were non-families. 30.10% of all households were made up of individuals, and 18.90% had someone living alone who was 65 years of age or older. The average household size was 2.54 and the average family size was 3.14.

The township's age distribution consisted of 26.4% under the age of 18, 5.8% from 18 to 24, 22.3% from 25 to 44, 23.8% from 45 to 64, and 21.8% who were 65 years of age or older. The median age was 41.7 years. For every 100 females, there were 81.6 males. For every 100 females age 18 and over, there were 75.9 males.

The median income for a household in the township was $56,862, and the median income for a family was $72,938. Males had a median income of $47,000 versus $27,066 for females. The per capita income for the township was $27,210. About 12.5% of families and 12.5% of the population were below the poverty line, including 15.4% of those under age 18 and 14.0% of those age 65 or over.

Historical population
Census	Pop.	Note	%±
2010	5,027		—
2020	4,922		−2.1%
U.S. Decennial Census

== School districts ==
- Galesburg Community Unit School District 205
- Knoxville Community Unit School District 202
- Abingdon-Avon Unit School District

== Political districts ==
- Illinois's 17th congressional district
- State House District 74
- State Senate District 37
