= Oak Run, Illinois =

- Census-designated place
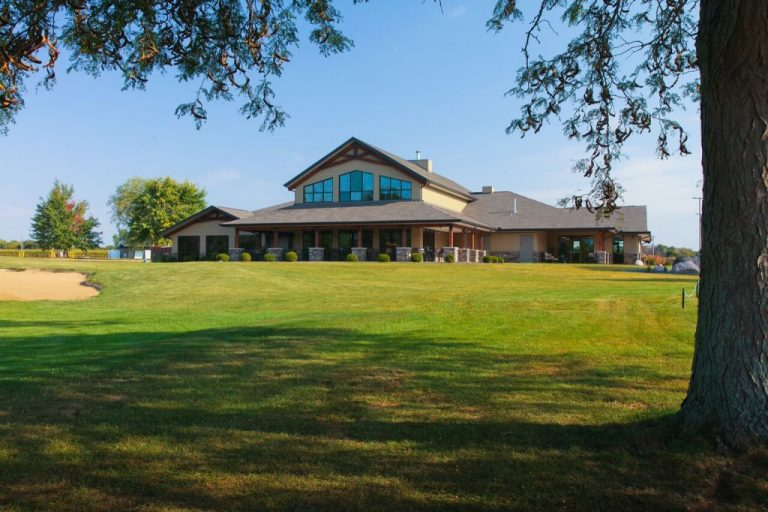
- Church in Oak Run

- Location within Illinois Location within the United States
- Coordinates: 40°57′49″N 90°07′39″W
- Country: United States
- State: Illinois
- County: Knox
- Townships: Persifer, Copley

Area
  - Total: 5.15 sq mi (13.34 km^{2})
  - Land: 4.28 sq mi (11.08 km^{2})
  - Water: 0.87 sq mi (2.26 km^{2})
- Elevation: 709 ft (216 m)

Population (2020)
  - Total: 721
  - Density: 169/sq mi (65.1/km^{2})
- Time zone: UTC-6 (CST)
  - Summer (DST): UTC-5 (CDT)
- ZIP code: 61428
- GNIS feature ID: 2628556
- FIPS Code: 17-54924

Oak Run is a census-designated place and resort community in Persifer and Copley townships, Knox County, Illinois, United States. As of the 2020 census, its population was 721.

== Description ==
Oak Run is located three miles (5 km) north of U.S. Highway 150 between Knox County Highway 12 and Knox County Highway 15. The development surrounds the 580-acre (2.3 km^{2}) Spoon Lake, the largest man-made body of water in Central Illinois. It consists of approximately 4,000 acres (16 km^{2}) of land situated in Persifer and Copley Townships. There is a golf course, convenience store, restaurant, and gas station as well as two marinas and several parks. Other facilities include a swimming pool, lounge building, tennis courts, beaches and a 56-site campground. The Oak Run area is maintained by the Oak Run rangers. There are both year round residents and vacation cottages located in Oak Run.

== History ==
Following the purchase of this acreage from 27 land owners, American Central commenced construction of Oak Run in 1971. Oak Run is situated in an area long referred to by area residents as "Round Bottom". The 580-acre (2.3 km^{2}) Spoon Lake was impounded by the construction of an earthen dam 61 feet (19 m) high and 550 feet (170 m) wide at its base. The lake is approximately 60 feet (18 m) deep at the dam and provides nearly 19 miles (31 km) of shoreline. The lake first reached pool elevation in 1973 and is fed by Sugar Creek and natural springs. More than 40 miles (64 km) of public hard surfaced roads have been constructed to county road specifications. The public Oak Run Golf Course opened in mid-summer of 1976.

== Demographics ==
Historical population
Census	Pop.	Note	%±
2010	547		—
2020	721		31.8%
U.S. Decennial Census

As of the 2020 census, there were 721 people, 222 households, and 152 families residing in the CDP. The population density was 140.00 inhabitants per square mile (54.05/km^{2}). There were 709 housing units at an average density of 137.67 per square mile (53.15/km^{2}). The racial makeup of the CDP was 95.56% White, 0.69% African American, 0.00% Native American, 0.42% Asian, 0.00% Pacific Islander, 0.28% from other races, and 3.05% from two or more races. Hispanic or Latino of any race were 1.39% of the population.

There were 222 households, out of which 14.9% had children under the age of 18 living with them, 65.32% were married couples living together, 3.15% had a female householder with no husband present, and 31.53% were non-families. 25.23% of all households were made up of individuals, and 14.86% had someone living alone who was 65 years of age or older. The average household size was 2.41 and the average family size was 2.11.

The CDP's age distribution consisted of 10.3% under the age of 18, 6.6% from 18 to 24, 5.9% from 25 to 44, 33.8% from 45 to 64, and 43.4% who were 65 years of age or older. The median age was 61.7 years. For every 100 females, there were 111.8 males. For every 100 females age 18 and over, there were 109.0 males.

The median income for a household in the CDP was $86,250, and the median income for a family was $93,125. Males had a median income of $146,875 versus $46,250 for females. The per capita income for the CDP was $62,863. About 3.9% of families and 8.2% of the population were below the poverty line, including 6.8% of those under age 18 and 3.9% of those age 65 or over.
