= Altona, Illinois =

- Village
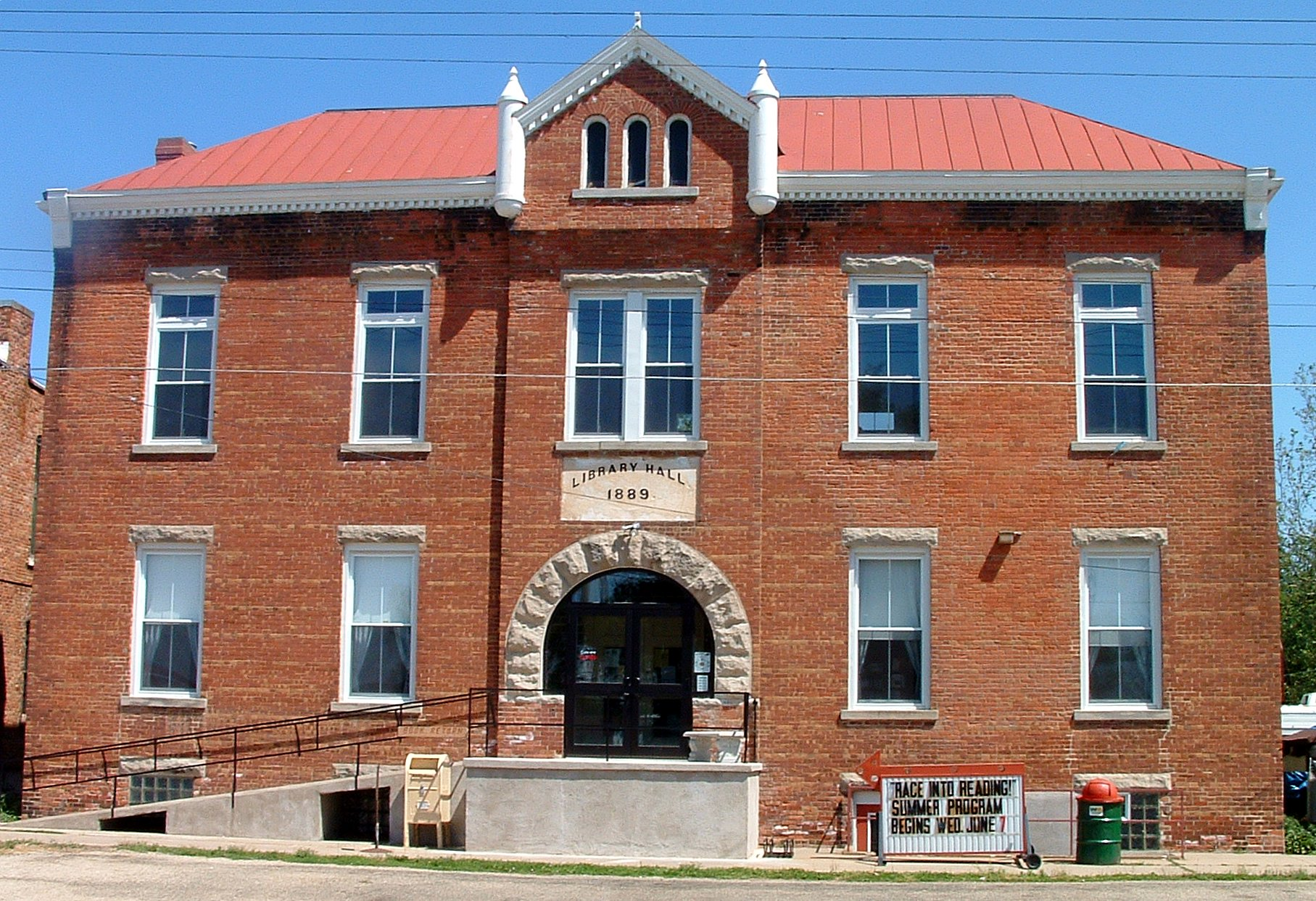
- Altona Public Library

- Location of Altona in Knox County, Illinois.
- Coordinates: 41°06′54″N 90°09′53″W
- Country: United States
- State: Illinois
- County: Knox
- Township: Walnut Grove

Area
  - Total: 0.94 sq mi (2.43 km^{2})
  - Land: 0.94 sq mi (2.43 km^{2})
  - Water: 0 sq mi (0.00 km^{2})
- Elevation: 761 ft (232 m)

Population (2020)
  - Total: 463
  - Density: 493/sq mi (190.5/km^{2})
- Time zone: UTC-6 (CST)
  - Summer (DST): UTC-5 (CDT)
- ZIP code: 61414
- Area code: 309
- FIPS code: 17-01140
- GNIS feature ID: 2397949
- Website: altonaillinois.weebly.com

Altona (formerly LaPier & Walnut Grove) is a village in Knox County, Illinois, United States. The population was 463 at the 2020 census. It is part of the Galesburg Micropolitan Statistical Area.

== History ==
Altona was originally called La Pier, and under the latter name was laid out in 1834.

== Geography ==
According to the 2021 census gazetteer files, Altona has a total area of 0.94 square miles (2.43 km^{2}), all land.

=== Climate ===
Climate data for Altona, Illinois, 1991–2020 normals, extremes 2005–present
Month	Jan	Feb	Mar	Apr	May	Jun	Jul	Aug	Sep	Oct	Nov	Dec	Year
Record high °F (°C)	62 (17)	73 (23)	82 (28)	87 (31)	96 (36)	96 (36)	102 (39)	99 (37)	97 (36)	91 (33)	76 (24)	73 (23)	102 (39)
Mean maximum °F (°C)	52.8 (11.6)	57.1 (13.9)	71.4 (21.9)	81.9 (27.7)	88.5 (31.4)	92.1 (33.4)	92.8 (33.8)	91.7 (33.2)	90.2 (32.3)	82.4 (28.0)	69.6 (20.9)	57.6 (14.2)	94.4 (34.7)
Mean daily maximum °F (°C)	29.9 (−1.2)	35.3 (1.8)	48.1 (8.9)	61.5 (16.4)	72.0 (22.2)	80.5 (26.9)	83.4 (28.6)	81.9 (27.7)	76.3 (24.6)	63.9 (17.7)	48.5 (9.2)	35.4 (1.9)	59.7 (15.4)
Daily mean °F (°C)	21.4 (−5.9)	25.5 (−3.6)	37.3 (2.9)	49.2 (9.6)	60.6 (15.9)	69.7 (20.9)	72.6 (22.6)	70.6 (21.4)	64.0 (17.8)	51.9 (11.1)	38.3 (3.5)	27.1 (−2.7)	49.0 (9.5)
Mean daily minimum °F (°C)	13.0 (−10.6)	15.8 (−9.0)	26.5 (−3.1)	36.9 (2.7)	49.2 (9.6)	58.9 (14.9)	61.8 (16.6)	59.3 (15.2)	51.6 (10.9)	39.8 (4.3)	28.1 (−2.2)	18.7 (−7.4)	38.3 (3.5)
Mean minimum °F (°C)	−9.8 (−23.2)	−5.1 (−20.6)	6.0 (−14.4)	22.2 (−5.4)	34.9 (1.6)	48.2 (9.0)	52.7 (11.5)	51.1 (10.6)	39.3 (4.1)	25.1 (−3.8)	10.3 (−12.1)	−0.9 (−18.3)	−14.9 (−26.1)
Record low °F (°C)	−32 (−36)	−24 (−31)	−12 (−24)	14 (−10)	27 (−3)	43 (6)	48 (9)	44 (7)	31 (−1)	18 (−8)	−4 (−20)	−15 (−26)	−32 (−36)
Average precipitation inches (mm)	1.82 (46)	2.07 (53)	2.58 (66)	4.00 (102)	5.21 (132)	4.72 (120)	3.98 (101)	3.76 (96)	3.81 (97)	2.77 (70)	2.56 (65)	2.10 (53)	39.38 (1,001)
Average snowfall inches (cm)	10.4 (26)	11.5 (29)	5.3 (13)	1.6 (4.1)	0.0 (0.0)	0.0 (0.0)	0.0 (0.0)	0.0 (0.0)	0.0 (0.0)	0.3 (0.76)	1.9 (4.8)	8.6 (22)	39.6 (99.66)
Average precipitation days (≥ 0.01 in)	9.1	8.6	10.3	11.6	12.2	11.1	7.6	7.0	8.3	10.2	7.4	9.2	112.6
Average snowy days (≥ 0.1 in)	6.3	5.4	3.2	0.7	0.0	0.0	0.0	0.0	0.0	0.3	1.0	4.9	21.8
Source 1: NOAA
Source 2: National Weather Service (mean maxima/minima 2006–2020)

== Demographics ==
Historical population
Census	Pop.	Note	%±
1870	902		—
1880	818		−9.3%
1890	654		−20.0%
1900	633		−3.2%
1910	528		−16.6%
1920	506		−4.2%
1930	464		−8.3%
1940	480		3.4%
1950	462		−3.7%
1960	505		9.3%
1970	542		7.3%
1980	610		12.5%
1990	559		−8.4%
2000	570		2.0%
2010	531		−6.8%
2020	463		−12.8%
U.S. Decennial Census

As of the 2020 census there were 463 people, 221 households, and 162 families residing in the village. The population density was 493.60 inhabitants per square mile (190.58/km^{2}). There were 218 housing units at an average density of 232.41 per square mile (89.73/km^{2}). The racial makeup of the village was 94.38% White, 0.00% African American, 0.00% Native American, 0.65% Asian, 0.22% Pacific Islander, 1.08% from other races, and 3.67% from two or more races. Hispanic or Latino of any race were 2.38% of the population.

There were 221 households, out of which 37.1% had children under the age of 18 living with them, 47.06% were married couples living together, 19.46% had a female householder with no husband present, and 26.70% were non-families. 15.38% of all households were made up of individuals, and 4.98% had someone living alone who was 65 years of age or older. The average household size was 3.16 and the average family size was 2.87.

The village's age distribution consisted of 25.6% under the age of 18, 12.3% from 18 to 24, 22.4% from 25 to 44, 25.3% from 45 to 64, and 14.5% who were 65 years of age or older. The median age was 31.9 years. For every 100 females, there were 108.6 males. For every 100 females age 18 and over, there were 88.8 males.

The median income for a household in the village was $59,583, and the median income for a family was $64,000. Males had a median income of $41,333 versus $30,333 for females. The per capita income for the village was $27,144. About 8.6% of families and 12.8% of the population were below the poverty line, including 27.8% of those under age 18 and 12.0% of those age 65 or over.

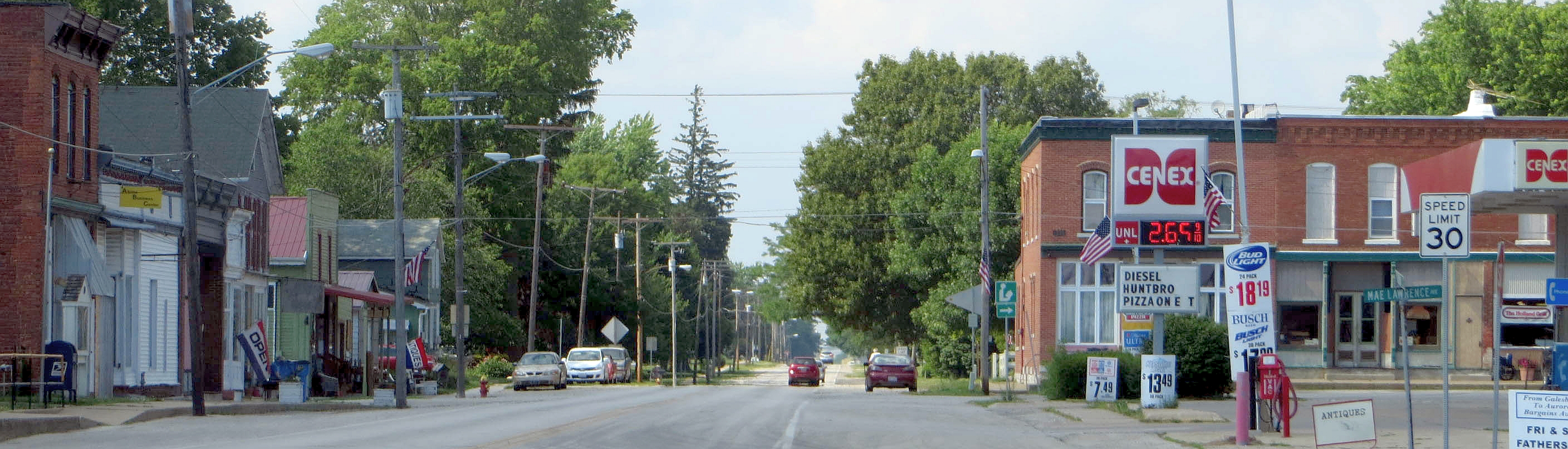
Altona, Illinois
