= Galesburg Township, Knox County, Illinois =

Galesburg Township
- Township
- Location in Knox County

- Knox County's location in Illinois
- Coordinates: 40°55′19″N 90°23′28″W
- Country: United States
- State: Illinois
- County: Knox
- Established: November 2, 1852

Area
  - Total: 21.37 sq mi (55.3 km^{2})
  - Land: 21.35 sq mi (55.3 km^{2})
  - Water: 0.01 sq mi (0.026 km^{2}) 0.07%
- Elevation: 774 ft (236 m)

Population (2020)
  - Total: 406
  - Density: 19.0/sq mi (7.34/km^{2})
- Time zone: UTC-6 (CST)
  - Summer (DST): UTC-5 (CDT)
- ZIP code: 61401
- FIPS code: 17-095-28339

Galesburg Township is one of twenty-one townships in Knox County, Illinois, USA. As of the 2020 census, its population was 406 and it contained 175 housing units.

== Geography ==
According to the 2021 census gazetteer files, Galesburg Township has a total area of 21.37 square miles (55.35 km^{2}), of which 21.35 square miles (55.30 km^{2}) (or 99.93%) is land and 0.01 square miles (0.03 km^{2}) (or 0.07%) is water.

=== Cemeteries ===
The township contains these two cemeteries: Clay and Saint Josephs.

== Demographics ==
As of the 2020 census there were 406 people, 142 households, and 107 families residing in the township. The population density was 19.00 inhabitants per square mile (7.34/km^{2}). There were 175 housing units at an average density of 8.19 per square mile (3.16/km^{2}). The racial makeup of the township was 90.39% White, 2.22% African American, 0.25% Native American, 0.49% Asian, 0.00% Pacific Islander, 0.49% from other races, and 6.16% from two or more races. Hispanic or Latino of any race were 4.43% of the population.

There were 142 households, out of which 40.80% had children under the age of 18 living with them, 62.68% were married couples living together, 12.68% had a female householder with no spouse present, and 24.65% were non-families. 24.60% of all households were made up of individuals, and 19.70% had someone living alone who was 65 years of age or older. The average household size was 2.07 and the average family size was 2.42.

The township's age distribution consisted of 25.2% under the age of 18, 0.0% from 18 to 24, 21.4% from 25 to 44, 21.8% from 45 to 64, and 31.6% who were 65 years of age or older. The median age was 45.4 years. For every 100 females, there were 104.2 males. For every 100 females age 18 and over, there were 71.9 males.

The median income for a household in the township was $55,946, and the median income for a family was $57,128. Males had a median income of $44,189 versus $14,231 for females. The per capita income for the township was $33,903. No families and 1.4% of the population were below the poverty line, including none of those under age 18 and 4.3% of those age 65 or over.

Historical population
Census	Pop.	Note	%±
2010	366		—
2020	406		10.9%
U.S. Decennial Census

== School districts ==
- Galesburg Community Unit School District 205

== Political districts ==
- Illinois's 17th congressional district
- State House District 74
- State Senate District 37
