= R.O.W.V.A. Community Unit School District 208 =

School district in Knox County, Illinois, United States

Address
- 335 North Joy Street Oneida, Illinois, 61467; United States

District information
- Type: Public
- Grades: PreK–12
- NCES District ID: 1729940

Students and staff
- Students: 618

Other information
- Website: www.rowva.k12.il.us

R O W V A Community Unit School District 208 is a rural school district based in Oneida, Illinois. Located near Galesburg in Knox County, R.O.W.V.A. serves the rural communities of Rio, Oneida, Wataga, Victoria, and Altona, and is situated between Peoria and the Quad Cities in the north-western part of the state.

R.O.W.V.A. Community Unit School District 208 is located in a "Rural area, outside a 'Core Based Statistical Area'" (Any incorporated place, Census designated place, or non-place territory not within a 'Core Based Statistical Area' or 'Consolidated Statistical Area' of a Large or Mid-size City and defined as rural by the Census Bureau.)

R.O.W.V.A. Community Unit School District 208 is a "Local school district that is not a component of a supervisory union". All schools associated with C.U.S.D.#208 are "non-charter schools".

District#208 maintains seven school buildings compared to the state average of 3.9 schools per district. R.O.W.V.A. employs roughly 60 full-time faculty employees, compared with the state average of 128.1 per district. Finally, R.O.W.V.A. enrolls an annual average of 813 students, as compared to the state average enrollment of 2,139.8 students per district.

The District includes ROWVA High School.

Grades Served: Pre-Kindergarten to 12th Grade

County: Knox

Lloyd Little, Superintendent
