= Truro Township, Knox County, Illinois =

Truro Township
- Township
- Location in Knox County

- Knox County's location in Illinois
- Coordinates: 40°55′50″N 90°02′22″W
- Country: United States
- State: Illinois
- County: Knox
- Established: November 2, 1852

Government
  - Road Commissioner: Ed Lewis

Area
  - Total: 35.80 sq mi (92.7 km^{2})
  - Land: 35.73 sq mi (92.5 km^{2})
  - Water: 0.07 sq mi (0.18 km^{2}) 0.19%
- Elevation: 690 ft (210 m)

Population (2020)
  - Total: 836
  - Density: 23.4/sq mi (9.03/km^{2})
- Time zone: UTC-6 (CST)
  - Summer (DST): UTC-5 (CDT)
- ZIP codes: 61428, 61485, 61489
- FIPS code: 17-095-76303

Truro Township is one of twenty-one townships in Knox County, Illinois, USA. As of the 2020 census, its population was 836 and it contained 423 housing units.

== Geography ==
According to the 2021 census gazetteer files, Truro Township has a total area of 35.80 square miles (92.72 km^{2}), of which 35.73 square miles (92.54 km^{2}) (or 99.81%) is land and 0.07 square miles (0.18 km^{2}) (or 0.19%) is water.

=== Cities, towns, villages ===
- Williamsfield

=== Unincorporated towns ===
- Truro at 40.957537°N 90.042337°W

(This list is based on USGS data and may include former settlements.)

=== Lakes ===
- Happy Hollow Lake

== Demographics ==
As of the 2020 census there were 836 people, 297 households, and 205 families residing in the township. The population density was 23.35 inhabitants per square mile (9.02/km^{2}). There were 423 housing units at an average density of 11.82 per square mile (4.56/km^{2}). The racial makeup of the township was 95.22% White, 0.84% African American, 0.12% Native American, 0.24% Asian, 0.00% Pacific Islander, 0.24% from other races, and 3.35% from two or more races. Hispanic or Latino of any race were 2.15% of the population.

There were 297 households, out of which 31.30% had children under the age of 18 living with them, 55.56% were married couples living together, 8.08% had a female householder with no spouse present, and 30.98% were non-families. 27.90% of all households were made up of individuals, and 15.20% had someone living alone who was 65 years of age or older. The average household size was 2.38 and the average family size was 2.93.

The township's age distribution consisted of 29.0% under the age of 18, 4.6% from 18 to 24, 26.1% from 25 to 44, 22% from 45 to 64, and 18.3% who were 65 years of age or older. The median age was 36.5 years. For every 100 females, there were 97.3 males. For every 100 females age 18 and over, there were 93.6 males.

The median income for a household in the township was $65,982, and the median income for a family was $77,188. Males had a median income of $55,000 versus $32,050 for females. The per capita income for the township was $33,872. About 9.3% of families and 9.4% of the population were below the poverty line, including 10.0% of those under age 18 and 7.6% of those age 65 or over.

Historical population
Census	Pop.	Note	%±
2010	840		—
2020	836		−0.5%
U.S. Decennial Census

== School districts ==
- Williamsfield Community Unit School District 210

== Political districts ==
- Illinois's 18th congressional district
- State House District 74
- State Senate District 37
