= Oneida, Illinois =

- City
- City of Oneida
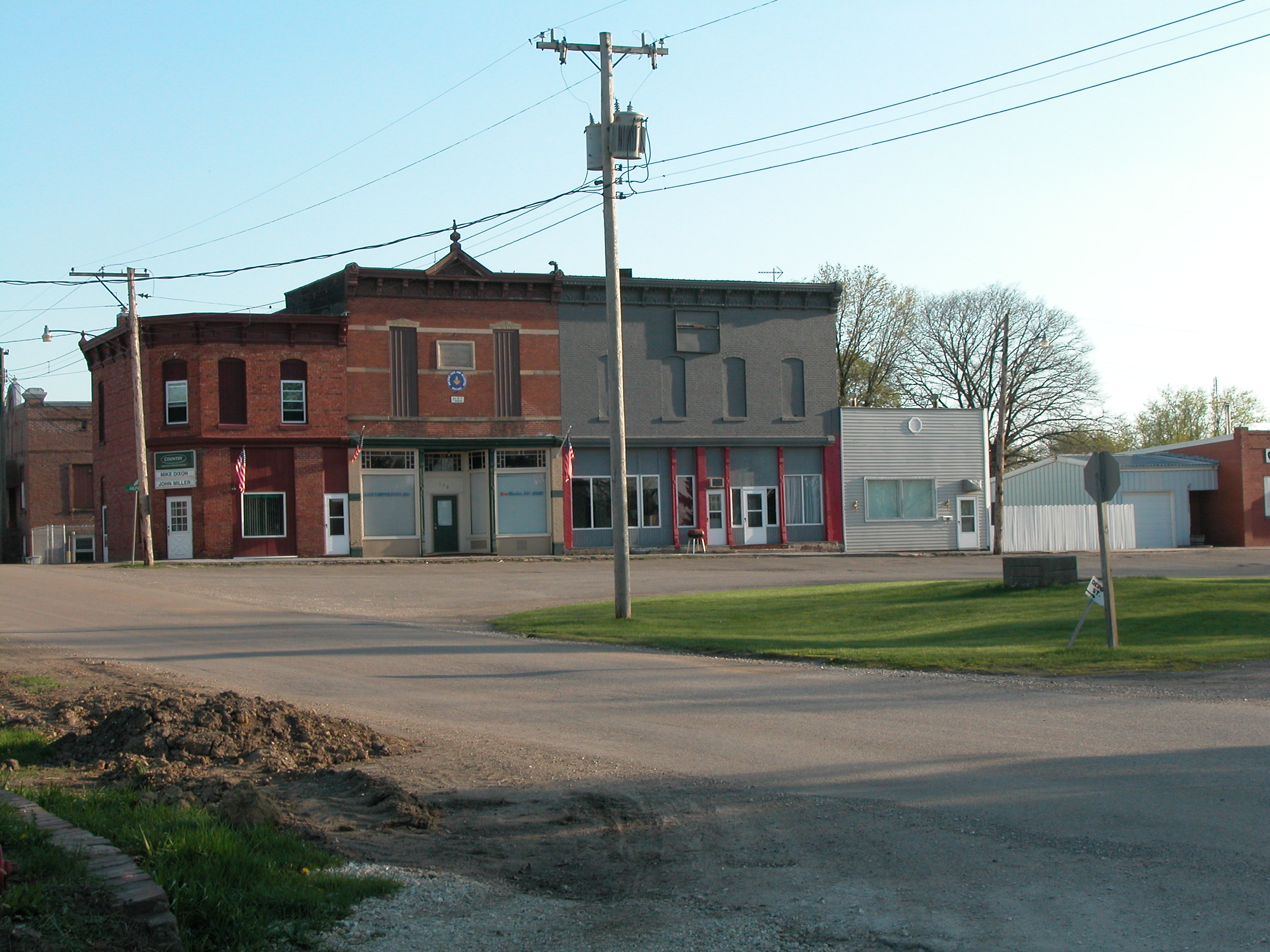
- Oneida, Illinois

- Location of Oneida in Knox County, Illinois.
- Coordinates: 41°04′20″N 90°13′29″W
- Country: United States
- State: Illinois
- County: Knox
- Township: Ontario
- Founded: 1854

Government
  - Type: Mayor, City Council Government

Area
  - Total: 0.76 sq mi (1.98 km^{2})
  - Land: 0.76 sq mi (1.98 km^{2})
  - Water: 0 sq mi (0.00 km^{2})
- Elevation: 817 ft (249 m)

Population (2020)
  - Total: 696
  - Density: 912.0/sq mi (352.11/km^{2})
- Time zone: UTC-6 (CST)
  - Summer (DST): UTC-5 (CDT)
- ZIP code: 61467
- Area code: 309
- FIPS code: 17-56159
- GNIS feature ID: 2396067
- Website: www.cityofoneidail.com

Oneida is a city in Knox County, Illinois, United States. The population was 696 at the 2020 census. It is part of the Galesburg Micropolitan Statistical Area.

== Geography ==
According to the 2021 census gazetteer files, Oneida has a total area of 0.76 square miles (1.97 km^{2}), all land.

== Demographics ==
Historical population
Census	Pop.	Note	%±
1860	646		—
1870	1,034		60.1%
1880	919		−11.1%
1890	699		−23.9%
1900	785		12.3%
1910	589		−25.0%
1920	563		−4.4%
1930	560		−0.5%
1940	556		−0.7%
1950	554		−0.4%
1960	672		21.3%
1970	728		8.3%
1980	765		5.1%
1990	723		−5.5%
2000	752		4.0%
2010	700		−6.9%
2020	696		−0.6%
U.S. Decennial Census

As of the 2020 census there were 696 people, 298 households, and 186 families residing in the city. The population density was 912.19 inhabitants per square mile (352.20/km^{2}). There were 310 housing units at an average density of 406.29 per square mile (156.87/km^{2}). The racial makeup of the city was 96.84% White, 0.57% African American, 0.29% Native American, 0.14% Asian, 0.00% Pacific Islander, 0.86% from other races, and 1.29% from two or more races. Hispanic or Latino of any race were 1.58% of the population.

There were 298 households, out of which 35.2% had children under the age of 18 living with them, 48.66% were married couples living together, 10.40% had a female householder with no husband present, and 37.58% were non-families. 36.24% of all households were made up of individuals, and 16.44% had someone living alone who was 65 years of age or older. The average household size was 3.45 and the average family size was 2.61.

The city's age distribution consisted of 27.5% under the age of 18, 8.6% from 18 to 24, 16.8% from 25 to 44, 34.7% from 45 to 64, and 12.3% who were 65 years of age or older. The median age was 41.5 years. For every 100 females, there were 87.0 males. For every 100 females age 18 and over, there were 72.5 males.

The median income for a household in the city was $56,705, and the median income for a family was $57,500. Males had a median income of $52,188 versus $42,813 for females. The per capita income for the city was $25,551. About 8.6% of families and 6.7% of the population were below the poverty line, including 10.3% of those under age 18 and 14.6% of those age 65 or over.

== Notable people ==
- A. T. McMaster, Illinois legislator and farmer, was born in Oneida.
- Donald L. Moffitt, member of the Illinois House of Representatives, mayor of Oneida from 1972 to 1975.
- Kid Mohler, second baseman for the Washington Senators, was born in Oneida.
