= Knox County, Illinois =

County in Illinois, United States

- County
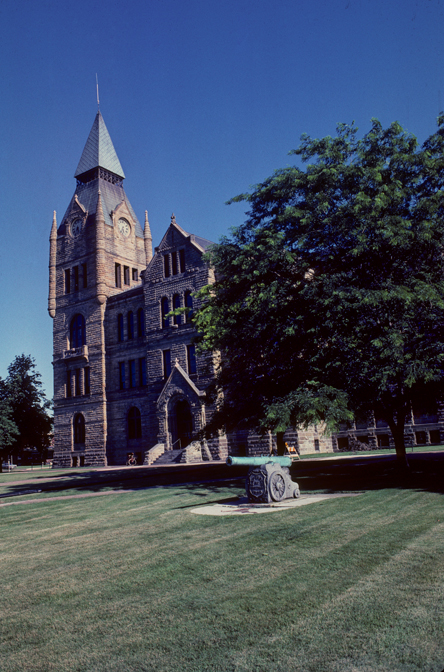
- Knox County Courthouse

- Location within the U.S. state of Illinois
- Coordinates: 40°56′N 90°13′W
- Country: United States
- State: Illinois
- Founded: 1825
- Named for: Henry Knox
- Seat: Galesburg
- Largest city: Galesburg

Government
  - Board Chairman: Jared Hawkinson

Area
  - Total: 720 sq mi (1,900 km^{2})
  - Land: 716 sq mi (1,850 km^{2})
  - Water: 3.4 sq mi (8.8 km^{2}) 0.5%

Population (2020)
  - Total: 49,967
  - Estimate (2025): 47,767 ▼
  - Density: 69.8/sq mi (26.9/km^{2})
- Time zone: UTC−6 (Central)
  - Summer (DST): UTC−5 (CDT)
- Congressional district: 17th
- Website: knoxcountyil.gov

Knox County is a county in the U.S. state of Illinois. According to the 2020 census, it had a population of 49,967. Its county seat is Galesburg. Knox County comprises the Galesburg micropolitan area, anchored by the city of Galesburg.

== History ==
Knox County was named in honor of Henry Knox, the first US Secretary of War.

The first "Knox County" in what became Illinois was unrelated to the modern incarnation. In 1790, the land of the Indiana Territory that was to become Illinois was divided into two counties: St. Clair and Knox. The latter included land in what was to become Indiana. When Knox County, Indiana, was formed from this portion of the county in 1809, the Illinois portions were subdivided into counties that were given other names.

The modern Knox County, Illinois, was organized in 1825, from Fulton County, itself a portion of the original St. Clair County.

Like its neighbor to the south, Fulton County, for its Spoon River Drive, Knox County is also known for a similar scenic drive fall festival the first two weekends in October, the Knox County Drive.

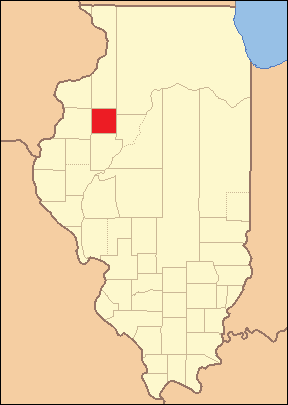
Knox County between its creation in 1825 and 1831

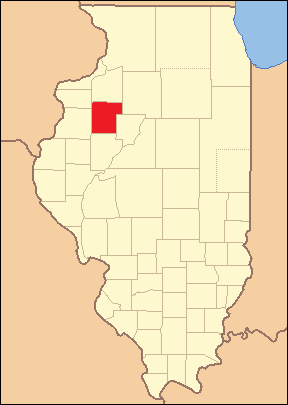
Knox County between 1831 and 1839

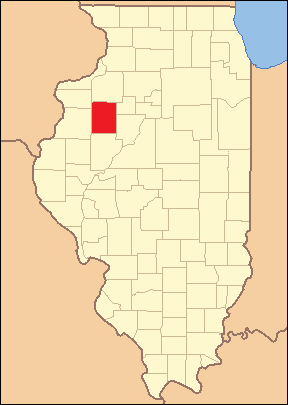
Knox County in 1839, when it was reduced slightly to its current size

== Geography ==
According to the U.S. Census Bureau, the county has a total area of 720 square miles (1,900 km^{2}), of which 716 square miles (1,850 km^{2}) is land and 3.4 square miles (8.8 km^{2}) (0.5%) is water.

=== Climate and weather ===
Galesburg, Illinois

Climate chart (precipitation, max. and min. temperature)
J	F	M	A	M	J	J	A	S	O	N	D
1.4 29 13	1.6 35 19	2.8 48 29	3.8 61 40	4 73 51	4.2 81 61	4.4 85 65	4.1 82 63	3.5 75 55	2.5 63 43	2.7 47 31	2.3 33 19
- █ Average max. and min. temperatures in °F
- █ Precipitation totals in inches
- Source: The Weather Channel
Metric conversion
J	F	M	A	M	J	J	A	S	O	N	D
36 −2 −11	39 2 −7	72 9 −2	97 16 4	101 23 11	106 27 16	111 29 18	103 28 17	89 24 13	64 17 6	69 8 −1	58 1 −7
- █ Average max. and min. temperatures in °C
- █ Precipitation totals in mm

In recent years, average temperatures in the county seat of Galesburg have ranged from a low of 13 °F (−11 °C) in January to a high of 85 °F (29 °C) in July, although a record low of −25 °F (−32 °C) was recorded in January 1982 and a record high of 102 °F (39 °C) was recorded in July 1983. Average monthly precipitation ranged from 1.41 inches (36 mm) in January to 4.37 inches (111 mm) in July.

=== Public Transit ===
- Galesburg station
- Burlington Trailways
- Galesburg Transit
- List of intercity bus stops in Illinois

=== Major highways ===
- I-74
- US 34
- US 150
- IL 8
- IL 17
- IL 41
- IL 78
- IL 97
- IL 110 (CKC)
- IL 116
- IL 164
- IL 167
- IL 180

=== Adjacent counties ===
- Mercer County - northwest
- Henry County - north
- Stark County - east
- Peoria County - southeast
- Fulton County - south
- Warren County - west

== Demographics ==
Historical population
Census	Pop.	Note	%±
1830	274		—
1840	7,060		2,476.6%
1850	13,279		88.1%
1860	28,663		115.9%
1870	39,522		37.9%
1880	38,344		−3.0%
1890	38,752		1.1%
1900	43,612		12.5%
1910	46,159		5.8%
1920	46,727		1.2%
1930	51,336		9.9%
1940	52,250		1.8%
1950	54,366		4.0%
1960	61,280		12.7%
1970	61,280		0.0%
1980	61,607		0.5%
1990	56,393		−8.5%
2000	55,836		−1.0%
2010	52,919		−5.2%
2020	49,967		−5.6%
2025 (est.)	47,767	▼	−4.4%
U.S. Decennial Census; 1790-1960 1900-1990; 1990-2000 2010-2013

2000 census age pyramid for Knox County

As of the census of 2000, there were 74,571 people, 29,222 households, and 19,390 families residing within the Galesburg μSA.

=== 2020 census ===
As of the 2020 census, the county had a population of 49,967. The median age was 43.3 years. 19.9% of residents were under the age of 18 and 22.2% of residents were 65 years of age or older. For every 100 females there were 101.7 males, and for every 100 females age 18 and over there were 100.6 males age 18 and over.

The racial makeup of the county was 81.4% White, 8.9% Black or African American, 0.2% American Indian and Alaska Native, 0.7% Asian, <0.1% Native Hawaiian and Pacific Islander, 2.3% from some other race, and 6.4% from two or more races. Hispanic or Latino residents of any race comprised 6.1% of the population.

67.7% of residents lived in urban areas, while 32.3% lived in rural areas.

There were 20,851 households in the county, of which 25.4% had children under the age of 18 living in them. Of all households, 41.1% were married-couple households, 20.8% were households with a male householder and no spouse or partner present, and 30.2% were households with a female householder and no spouse or partner present. About 35.1% of all households were made up of individuals and 17.1% had someone living alone who was 65 years of age or older.

There were 23,817 housing units, of which 12.5% were vacant. Among occupied housing units, 68.5% were owner-occupied and 31.5% were renter-occupied. The homeowner vacancy rate was 2.9% and the rental vacancy rate was 9.1%.

=== Racial and ethnic composition ===
Knox County, Illinois – Racial and ethnic composition Note: the US Census treats Hispanic/Latino as an ethnic category. This table excludes Latinos from the racial categories and assigns them to a separate category. Hispanics/Latinos may be of any race.
Race / Ethnicity (NH = Non-Hispanic)	Pop 1980	Pop 1990	Pop 2000	Pop 2010	Pop 2020	% 1980	% 1990	% 2000	% 2010	% 2020
White alone (NH)	58,025	51,744	49,355	45,132	39,615	94.19%	91.76%	88.39%	85.29%	79.28%
Black or African American alone (NH)	1,987	2,804	3,472	3,741	4,354	3.23%	4.97%	6.22%	7.07%	8.71%
Native American or Alaska Native alone (NH)	66	82	83	75	73	0.11%	0.15%	0.15%	0.14%	0.15%
Asian alone (NH)	201	319	382	331	361	0.33%	0.57%	0.68%	0.63%	0.72%
Native Hawaiian or Pacific Islander alone (NH)	x	x	8	7	12	x	x	0.01%	0.01%	0.02%
Other race alone (NH)	86	28	36	44	207	0.14%	0.05%	0.06%	0.08%	0.41%
Mixed race or Multiracial (NH)	x	x	604	1,031	2,294	x	x	1.08%	1.95%	4.59%
Hispanic or Latino (any race)	1,242	1,416	1,896	2,558	3,051	2.02%	2.51%	3.40%	4.83%	6.11%
Total	61,607	56,393	55,836	52,919	49,967	100.00%	100.00%	100.00%	100.00%	100.00%

=== 2010 census ===
As of the 2010 United States census, there were 52,919 people, 21,535 households, and 13,324 families residing in the county. The population density was 73.9 inhabitants per square mile (28.5/km^{2}). There were 24,077 housing units at an average density of 33.6 per square mile (13.0/km^{2}). The racial makeup of the county was 87.5% white, 7.2% black or African American, 0.6% Asian, 0.2% American Indian, 1.9% from other races, and 2.5% from two or more races. Those of Hispanic or Latino origin made up 4.8% of the population. In terms of ancestry, 23.1% were German, 14.9% were Irish, 11.7% were English, 11.6% were Swedish, and 8.0% were American.

Of the 21,535 households, 27.2% had children under the age of 18 living with them, 45.7% were married couples living together, 11.9% had a female householder with no husband present, 38.1% were non-families, and 32.3% of all households were made up of individuals. The average household size was 2.27 and the average family size was 2.84. The median age was 42.0 years.

The median income for a household in the county was $39,545 and the median income for a family was $51,740. Males had a median income of $42,067 versus $25,380 for females. The per capita income for the county was $20,908. About 10.9% of families and 15.5% of the population were below the poverty line, including 24.7% of those under age 18 and 7.3% of those age 65 or over.

== Communities ==
=== Cities ===
- Abingdon
- Galesburg
- Knoxville
- Oneida

=== Villages ===
- Altona
- East Galesburg
- Henderson
- London Mills (mostly in Fulton County)
- Maquon
- Rio
- St. Augustine
- Victoria
- Wataga
- Williamsfield
- Yates City

=== Census-designated places ===
- Gilson
- Oak Run

=== Other unincorporated communities ===
- Appleton
- Centerville
- Columbia Heights
- Dahinda
- Delong
- Douglas
- Elba Center
- Henderson Grove
- Hermon
- Ontario
- Rapatee
- Saluda
- Soperville
- Trenton Corners
- Truro
- Uniontown

=== Townships ===
Knox County is divided into twenty-one townships:

- Cedar
- Chestnut
- Copley
- Elba
- Galesburg
- Galesburg City
- Haw Creek
- Henderson
- Indian Point
- Knox
- Lynn
- Maquon
- Ontario
- Orange
- Persifer
- Rio
- Salem
- Sparta
- Truro
- Victoria
- Walnut Grove

== Politics ==
Knox County's political history is typical of Yankee-settled Northern Illinois. It leaned Whig during its early elections – although giving a plurality to Franklin Pierce in 1852 – and become powerfully Republican following that party's formation. Although Knox did support Progressive Theodore Roosevelt against conservative incumbent President William Howard Taft in 1912, it was Franklin D. Roosevelt’s 1932 landslide before Knox County again gave the Democratic Party so much as a plurality, and it did not give a Democratic absolute majority until Lyndon B. Johnson gained such against the anti-Yankee, Southern-leaning Barry Goldwater in 1964.

Since then, Knox County gradually trended Democratic for the following four decades, so that Michael Dukakis in his losing 1988 campaign was able to carry the county by the same margin as Johnson had done in 1964. During the 1990s and 2000s, Knox was a solidly Democratic county, voting Democratic by at least nine percentage points in every election from 1992 to 2012. The 2016 election, in the shadow of high unemployment in the “Rust Belt” saw a swing of over twenty percentage points to Donald Trump, who became the first Republican victor in the county since Ronald Reagan in 1984.

United States presidential election results for Knox County, Illinois
Year	Republican		Democratic		Third party(ies)	
Year	No.	%	No.	%	No.	%
1892	5,800	60.49%	3,073	32.05%	715	7.46%
1896	7,681	67.39%	3,480	30.53%	236	2.07%
1900	7,810	67.62%	3,299	28.57%	440	3.81%
1904	7,566	73.84%	1,849	18.04%	832	8.12%
1908	7,084	63.83%	3,277	29.53%	737	6.64%
1912	1,750	16.72%	2,758	26.35%	5,959	56.93%
1916	10,918	58.82%	6,785	36.55%	860	4.63%
1920	12,559	73.85%	2,852	16.77%	1,594	9.37%
1924	12,968	65.89%	2,617	13.30%	4,095	20.81%
1928	16,151	72.33%	5,993	26.84%	186	0.83%
1932	12,244	49.14%	12,282	49.29%	392	1.57%
1936	14,712	50.52%	13,697	47.03%	715	2.46%
1940	17,459	57.77%	12,597	41.68%	168	0.56%
1944	15,964	61.02%	10,070	38.49%	126	0.48%
1948	15,016	60.18%	9,772	39.16%	164	0.66%
1952	18,569	64.16%	10,354	35.78%	17	0.06%
1956	18,656	66.04%	9,558	33.83%	37	0.13%
1960	17,938	60.09%	11,889	39.83%	23	0.08%
1964	12,850	46.14%	15,000	53.86%	0	0.00%
1968	14,216	53.86%	9,707	36.77%	2,473	9.37%
1972	17,315	64.69%	9,333	34.87%	118	0.44%
1976	14,123	54.39%	11,525	44.38%	319	1.23%
1980	14,907	56.90%	8,749	33.40%	2,542	9.70%
1984	14,974	55.21%	12,027	44.34%	121	0.45%
1988	10,842	45.75%	12,752	53.81%	106	0.45%
1992	8,331	32.93%	12,524	49.51%	4,441	17.56%
1996	7,822	34.69%	12,487	55.38%	2,239	9.93%
2000	9,912	42.77%	12,572	54.25%	690	2.98%
2004	11,111	44.97%	13,403	54.25%	194	0.79%
2008	9,419	39.09%	14,191	58.89%	488	2.03%
2012	9,408	40.28%	13,451	57.59%	497	2.13%
2016	10,737	47.71%	10,083	44.81%	1,683	7.48%
2020	12,009	51.75%	10,703	46.12%	496	2.14%
2024	11,917	53.45%	9,838	44.13%	540	2.42%

== Education ==
School districts include:

- Abingdon-Avon Community Unit School District 276
- Farmington Central Community Unit School District 265
- Galesburg Community Unit School District 205
- Galva Community Unit School District 224
- Knoxville Community Unit School District 202
- ROWVA Community Unit School District 208
- Spoon River Valley Community Unit School District 4
- Stark County Community Unit School District 100
- United Community School District 304
- Williamsfield Community Unit School District 210

== See also ==
- National Register of Historic Places listings in Knox County, Illinois
