= Wataga, Illinois =

Wataga
- Village
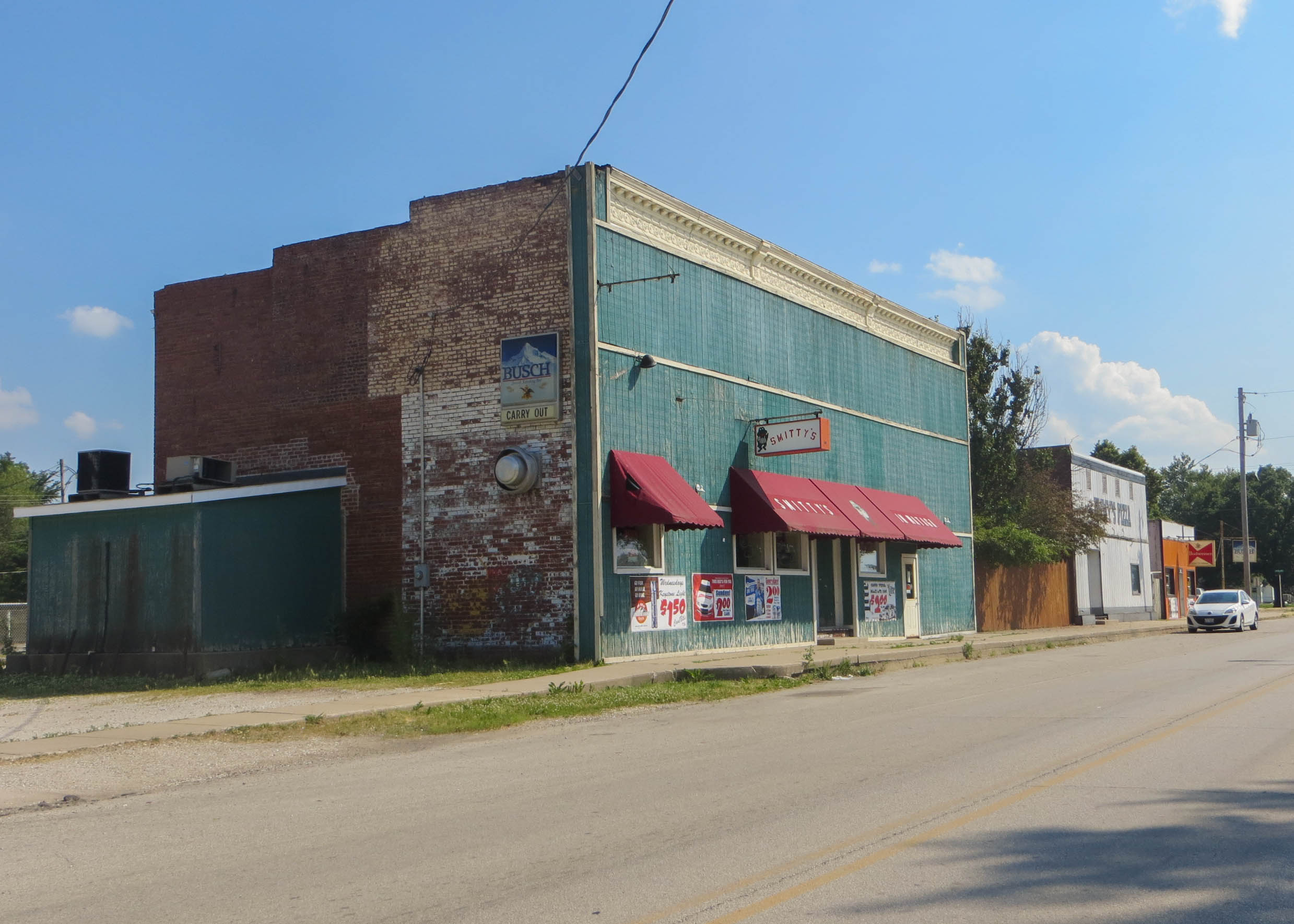
- Depot Road in Wataga
- Motto: Just a small town, living in a lonely world.
- Location of Wataga in Knox County, Illinois
- Coordinates: 41°01′31″N 90°16′32″W
- Country: United States
- State: Illinois
- County: Knox
- Township: Sparta

Area
  - Total: 0.83 sq mi (2.15 km^{2})
  - Land: 0.83 sq mi (2.15 km^{2})
  - Water: 0 sq mi (0.00 km^{2})
- Elevation: 830 ft (250 m)

Population (2020)
  - Total: 744
  - Density: 897/sq mi (346.5/km^{2})
- Time zone: UTC-6 (CST)
  - Summer (DST): UTC-5 (CDT)
- ZIP Code(s): 61488
- Area code: 309
- FIPS code: 17-79124
- GNIS feature ID: 2400101

Wataga is a village in Knox County, Illinois, United States. The population was 744 at the 2020 census. It is part of the Galesburg Micropolitan Statistical Area.

== Geography ==
According to the 2021 census gazetteer files, Wataga has a total area of 0.83 square miles (2.15 km^{2}), all land.

== Demographics ==
Historical population
Census	Pop.	Note	%±
1860	1,538		—
1870	1,205		−21.7%
1880	734		−39.1%
1890	586		−20.2%
1900	545		−7.0%
1910	444		−18.5%
1920	459		3.4%
1930	487		6.1%
1940	540		10.9%
1950	550		1.9%
1960	570		3.6%
1970	570		0.0%
1980	996		74.7%
1990	879		−11.7%
2000	857		−2.5%
2010	843		−1.6%
2020	744		−11.7%
U.S. Decennial Census

As of the 2020 census there were 744 people, 346 households, and 225 families residing in the village. The population density was 897.47 inhabitants per square mile (346.52/km^{2}). There were 365 housing units at an average density of 440.29 per square mile (170.00/km^{2}). The racial makeup of the village was 93.68% White, 1.34% African American, 0.00% Native American, 0.54% Asian, 0.00% Pacific Islander, 0.54% from other races, and 3.90% from two or more races. Hispanic or Latino of any race were 4.30% of the population.

There were 346 households, out of which 22.3% had children under the age of 18 living with them, 51.45% were married couples living together, 10.12% had a female householder with no husband present, and 34.97% were non-families. 25.72% of all households were made up of individuals, and 10.69% had someone living alone who was 65 years of age or older. The average household size was 2.72 and the average family size was 2.25.

The village's age distribution consisted of 22.5% under the age of 18, 11.8% from 18 to 24, 27% from 25 to 44, 21.5% from 45 to 64, and 17.1% who were 65 years of age or older. The median age was 34.5 years. For every 100 females, there were 93.5 males. For every 100 females age 18 and over, there were 98.4 males.

The median income for a household in the village was $46,250, and the median income for a family was $61,125. Males had a median income of $40,795 versus $22,692 for females. The per capita income for the village was $23,927. About 19.1% of families and 24.0% of the population were below the poverty line, including 40.6% of those under age 18 and 0.8% of those age 65 or over.
