= Victoria, Illinois =

- Village
- Location of Victoria in Knox County, Illinois
- Coordinates: 41°01′49″N 90°05′14″W
- Country: United States
- State: Illinois
- County: Knox
- Townships: Victoria, Copley

Area
  - Total: 0.45 sq mi (1.17 km^{2})
  - Land: 0.45 sq mi (1.17 km^{2})
  - Water: 0 sq mi (0.00 km^{2})
- Elevation: 810 ft (250 m)

Population (2020)
  - Total: 268
  - Density: 594.5/sq mi (229.55/km^{2})
- Time zone: UTC-6 (CST)
  - Summer (DST): UTC-5 (CDT)
- ZIP code: 61485
- Area code: 309
- FIPS code: 17-77811
- GNIS feature ID: 2400069

Victoria is a village in Knox County, Illinois, United States. The population was 268 at the 2020 census. It is part of the Galesburg Micropolitan Statistical Area.

== Geography ==
Victoria is located in northeastern Knox Count 17 miles (27 km) northeast of Galesburg, the county seat. Illinois Route 167 runs east–west through the center of the village.

According to the 2021 census gazetteer files, Victoria has a total area of 0.45 square miles (1.17 km^{2}), all land.

== Demographics ==
Historical population
Census	Pop.	Note	%±
1890	308		—
1900	329		6.8%
1910	334		1.5%
1920	415		24.3%
1930	403		−2.9%
1940	446		10.7%
1950	469		5.2%
1960	453		−3.4%
1970	441		−2.6%
1980	389		−11.8%
1990	299		−23.1%
2000	323		8.0%
2010	316		−2.2%
2020	268		−15.2%
U.S. Decennial Census

As of the 2020 census there were 268 people, 109 households, and 67 families residing in the village. The population density was 594.24 inhabitants per square mile (229.44/km^{2}). There were 132 housing units at an average density of 292.68 per square mile (113.00/km^{2}). The racial makeup of the village was 96.27% White, 0.00% African American, 0.00% Native American, 0.00% Asian, 0.00% Pacific Islander, 1.12% from other races, and 2.61% from two or more races. Hispanic or Latino of any race were 2.24% of the population.

There were 109 households, out of which 21.1% had children under the age of 18 living with them, 46.79% were married couples living together, 11.93% had a female householder with no husband present, and 38.53% were non-families. 38.53% of all households were made up of individuals, and 15.60% had someone living alone who was 65 years of age or older. The average household size was 2.67 and the average family size was 2.06.

The village's age distribution consisted of 17.9% under the age of 18, 8.5% from 18 to 24, 16.9% from 25 to 44, 30.3% from 45 to 64, and 26.3% who were 65 years of age or older. The median age was 53.0 years. For every 100 females, there were 85.1 males. For every 100 females age 18 and over, there were 78.6 males.

The median income for a household in the village was $40,250, and the median income for a family was $52,083. Males had a median income of $37,188 versus $25,625 for females. The per capita income for the village was $29,222. About 10.4% of families and 10.7% of the population were below the poverty line, including 10.0% of those under age 18 and 6.8% of those age 65 or over.

== Education ==
R.O.W.V.A. Community Unit School District 208 is made up of five major towns: Rio, Oneida, Wataga, Victoria, and Altona. PreK-12th grade go to ROWVA in Oneida. ROWVA Central, ROWVA Jr. High, and ROWVA High School are all in one basic building, just different sections. ROWVA's school colors are black, gold, and white, with their mascot being a tiger. Rowva and Williamsfield co-op basketball (maroon and gold.) Since 2009 fall season, ROWVA has also been part of a sports co-op with Galva and Williamsfield where they are the Mid-County Cougars (black, blue, and white.) ROWVA is a part of the Mid-County co-op for golf, cross country, and football.

== Notable people ==
- Bob Swisher, running back for Northwestern and the Chicago Bears
