= Annawan Township, Henry County, Illinois =

Annawan Township
- Township
- Location in Henry County

- Henry County's location in Illinois
- Coordinates: 41°22′20″N 89°55′19″W
- Country: United States
- State: Illinois
- County: Henry
- Established: November 4, 1856

Area
  - Total: 36.52 sq mi (94.6 km^{2})
  - Land: 36.32 sq mi (94.1 km^{2})
  - Water: 0.20 sq mi (0.52 km^{2}) 0.54%
- Elevation: 636 ft (194 m)

Population (2020)
  - Total: 1,143
  - Density: 31.47/sq mi (12.15/km^{2})
- Time zone: UTC-6 (CST)
  - Summer (DST): UTC-5 (CDT)
- ZIP codes: 61234, 61235, 61344, 61443
- FIPS code: 17-073-01582

Annawan Township is one of twenty-four townships in Henry County, Illinois, USA. As of the 2020 census, its population was 1,143 and it contained 522 housing units.

== Geography ==
According to the 2021 census gazetteer files, Annawan Township has a total area of 36.52 square miles (94.59 km^{2}), of which 36.32 square miles (94.07 km^{2}) (or 99.46%) is land and 0.20 square miles (0.52 km^{2}) (or 0.54%) is water.

=== Cities, towns, villages ===
- Annawan (vast majority)

=== Adjacent townships ===
- Alba Township (north)
- Gold Township, Bureau County (northeast)
- Mineral Township, Bureau County (east)
- Neponset Township, Bureau County (southeast)
- Kewanee Township (south)
- Burns Township (southwest)
- Cornwall Township (west)
- Atkinson Township (northwest)

=== Major highways ===
- Interstate 80
- U.S. Route 6
- Illinois Route 78

=== Landmarks ===
- Hennepin Canal Parkway State Park (east edge)
- Johnson Sauk Trail State Park (north half)

== Demographics ==
As of the 2020 census there were 1,143 people, 419 households, and 254 families residing in the township. The population density was 31.30 inhabitants per square mile (12.08/km^{2}). There were 522 housing units at an average density of 14.30 per square mile (5.52/km^{2}). The racial makeup of the township was 93.00% White, 0.52% African American, 0.00% Native American, 1.57% Asian, 0.00% Pacific Islander, 1.22% from other races, and 3.67% from two or more races. Hispanic or Latino of any race were 3.67% of the population.

There were 419 households, out of which 26.00% had children under the age of 18 living with them, 41.77% were married couples living together, 15.27% had a female householder with no spouse present, and 39.38% were non-families. 37.50% of all households were made up of individuals, and 17.70% had someone living alone who was 65 years of age or older. The average household size was 2.28 and the average family size was 3.01.

The township's age distribution consisted of 21.8% under the age of 18, 8.3% from 18 to 24, 23.4% from 25 to 44, 27.9% from 45 to 64, and 18.6% who were 65 years of age or older. The median age was 42.8 years. For every 100 females, there were 92.0 males. For every 100 females age 18 and over, there were 83.3 males.

The median income for a household in the township was $48,750, and the median income for a family was $70,417. Males had a median income of $47,250 versus $17,734 for females. The per capita income for the township was $28,961. About 5.9% of families and 6.9% of the population were below the poverty line, including 7.3% of those under age 18 and 4.5% of those age 65 or over.

Historical population
Census	Pop.	Note	%±
2000	1,113		—
2010	1,112		−0.1%
2020	1,143		2.8%
U.S. Decennial Census

== School districts ==
- Annawan Community Unit School District 226
- Kewanee Community Unit School District 229

== Political districts ==
- Illinois's 14th congressional district
- State House District 74
- State Senate District 37
