= Kewanee Township, Henry County, Illinois =

Kewanee Township
- Township
- Location in Henry County

- Henry County's location in Illinois
- Coordinates: 41°16′51″N 89°54′59″W
- Country: United States
- State: Illinois
- County: Henry
- Established: November 4, 1856

Area
  - Total: 36.18 sq mi (93.7 km^{2})
  - Land: 36.17 sq mi (93.7 km^{2})
  - Water: 0.02 sq mi (0.052 km^{2}) 0.05%
- Elevation: 738 ft (225 m)

Population (2010)
  - Total: 9,800
  - Density: 270/sq mi (100/km^{2})
- Time zone: UTC-6 (CST)
  - Summer (DST): UTC-5 (CDT)
- ZIP code: 61443
- FIPS code: 17-073-39740

Kewanee Township is one of twenty-four townships in Henry County, Illinois, USA. As of the 2020 census, its population was 9,800 and it contained 4,464 housing units.

== Geography ==
According to the 2021 census gazetteer files, Kewanee Township has a total area of 36.18 square miles (93.71 km^{2}), of which 36.17 square miles (93.68 km^{2}) (or 99.95%) is land and 0.02 square miles (0.05 km^{2}) (or 0.05%) is water.

=== Cities, towns, villages ===
- Kewanee (north half)

=== Adjacent townships ===
- Annawan Township (north)
- Mineral Township, Bureau County (northeast)
- Neponset Township, Bureau County (east)
- Elmira Township, Stark County (southeast)
- Wethersfield Township (south)
- Burns Township (west)
- Cornwall Township (northwest)

=== Cemeteries ===
The township contains these eight cemeteries: Garden of Peace, Mount Olivet, Old Kewanee Public, Orthodox, Pace, Pleasant View, Saint Michael and South Pleasant View.

=== Major highways ===
- U.S. Route 34
- Illinois Route 78
- Illinois Route 81

=== Airports and landing strips ===
- Kewanee Hospital Heliport

=== Landmarks ===
- Baker Park
- Chautaqua Park
- Francis Park
- Johnson Sauk Trail State Park (south half)
- Northeast Park
- West Park

== Demographics ==
As of the 2020 census there were 9,800 people, 4,015 households, and 2,469 families residing in the township. The population density was 270.85 inhabitants per square mile (104.58/km^{2}). There were 4,464 housing units at an average density of 123.38 per square mile (47.64/km^{2}). The racial makeup of the township was 75.40% White, 7.64% African American, 0.29% Native American, 0.23% Asian, 0.06% Pacific Islander, 8.09% from other races, and 8.29% from two or more races. Hispanic or Latino of any race were 15.96% of the population.

There were 4,015 households, out of which 29.10% had children under the age of 18 living with them, 41.20% were married couples living together, 12.58% had a female householder with no spouse present, and 38.51% were non-families. 34.50% of all households were made up of individuals, and 13.50% had someone living alone who was 65 years of age or older. The average household size was 2.39 and the average family size was 3.04.

The township's age distribution consisted of 27.0% under the age of 18, 7.2% from 18 to 24, 22.5% from 25 to 44, 24.6% from 45 to 64, and 18.7% who were 65 years of age or older. The median age was 37.6 years. For every 100 females, there were 102.0 males. For every 100 females age 18 and over, there were 102.3 males.

The median income for a household in the township was $35,979, and the median income for a family was $43,919. Males had a median income of $34,961 versus $25,336 for females. The per capita income for the township was $21,112. About 19.6% of families and 28.8% of the population were below the poverty line, including 46.3% of those under age 18 and 15.5% of those age 65 or over.

Historical population
Census	Pop.	Note	%±
2000	10,262		—
2010	10,162		−1.0%
2020	9,800		−3.6%
U.S. Decennial Census

== School districts ==
- Annawan Community Unit School District 226
- Kewanee Community Unit School District 229
- Wethersfield Community Unit School District 230

== Political districts ==
- Illinois's 17th congressional district
- State House District 74
- State Senate District 37
