= Galva Township, Henry County, Illinois =

Galva Township
- Township
- Location in Henry County

- Henry County's location in Illinois
- Coordinates: 41°11′35″N 90°02′25″W
- Country: United States
- State: Illinois
- County: Henry
- Established: November 4, 1856

Area
  - Total: 34.29 sq mi (88.8 km^{2})
  - Land: 34.28 sq mi (88.8 km^{2})
  - Water: 0.01 sq mi (0.026 km^{2}) 0.02%
- Elevation: 761 ft (232 m)

Population (2020)
  - Total: 2,712
  - Density: 79.11/sq mi (30.55/km^{2})
- Time zone: UTC-6 (CST)
  - Summer (DST): UTC-5 (CDT)
- ZIP codes: 61238, 61434, 61443
- FIPS code: 17-073-28443

Galva Township is one of twenty-four townships in Henry County, Illinois, USA. As of the 2020 census, its population was 2,712 and it contained 1,367 housing units.

== History ==
Galva Township was named by Olaf Johnson, a native of Gävle, in Sweden.

== Geography ==
According to the 2021 census gazetteer files, Galva Township has a total area of 34.29 square miles (88.81 km^{2}), of which 34.28 square miles (88.78 km^{2}) (or 99.98%) is land and 0.01 square miles (0.03 km^{2}) (or 0.02%) is water.

=== Cities, towns, villages ===
- Galva

=== Adjacent townships ===
- Burns Township (north)
- Wethersfield Township (east)
- Goshen Township, Stark County (southeast)
- Lynn Township, Knox County (south)
- Walnut Grove Township, Knox County (southwest)
- Weller Township (west)
- Cambridge Township (northwest)

=== Cemeteries ===
The township contains Saint Johns Cemetery.

=== Major highways ===
- U.S. Route 34
- Illinois Route 17

=== Landmarks ===
- Wiley Park

== Demographics ==
As of the 2020 census there were 2,712 people, 1,212 households, and 738 families residing in the township. The population density was 79.10 inhabitants per square mile (30.54/km^{2}). There were 1,367 housing units at an average density of 39.87 per square mile (15.39/km^{2}). The racial makeup of the township was 93.51% White, 0.85% African American, 0.11% Native American, 0.22% Asian, 0.04% Pacific Islander, 0.44% from other races, and 4.83% from two or more races. Hispanic or Latino of any race were 2.84% of the population.

There were 1,212 households, out of which 25.40% had children under the age of 18 living with them, 47.77% were married couples living together, 10.64% had a female householder with no spouse present, and 39.11% were non-families. 37.70% of all households were made up of individuals, and 14.90% had someone living alone who was 65 years of age or older. The average household size was 2.25 and the average family size was 2.97.

The township's age distribution consisted of 23.5% under the age of 18, 5.4% from 18 to 24, 22.1% from 25 to 44, 27.8% from 45 to 64, and 21.2% who were 65 years of age or older. The median age was 43.6 years. For every 100 females, there were 98.2 males. For every 100 females age 18 and over, there were 99.2 males.

The median income for a household in the township was $50,000, and the median income for a family was $66,154. Males had a median income of $46,848 versus $28,611 for females. The per capita income for the township was $26,529. About 13.3% of families and 18.2% of the population were below the poverty line, including 40.7% of those under age 18 and 5.4% of those age 65 or over.

Historical population
Census	Pop.	Note	%±
2000	3,097		—
2010	2,837		−8.4%
2020	2,712		−4.4%
U.S. Decennial Census

== School districts ==
- Galva Community Unit School District 224
- Wethersfield Community Unit School District 230

== Political districts ==
- Illinois's 17th congressional district
- State House District 74
- State Senate District 37
