= Weller Township, Henry County, Illinois =

Weller Township
- Township
- Location in Henry County

- Henry County's location in Illinois
- Coordinates: 41°11′42″N 90°09′18″W
- Country: United States
- State: Illinois
- County: Henry
- Established: November 4, 1856

Area
  - Total: 34.37 sq mi (89.0 km^{2})
  - Land: 34.36 sq mi (89.0 km^{2})
  - Water: 0.01 sq mi (0.026 km^{2}) 0.03%
- Elevation: 720 ft (220 m)

Population (2020)
  - Total: 413
  - Density: 12.0/sq mi (4.64/km^{2})
- Time zone: UTC-6 (CST)
  - Summer (DST): UTC-5 (CDT)
- ZIP codes: 61238, 61414, 61419, 61434, 61490
- FIPS code: 17-073-79722

Weller Township is one of twenty-four townships in Henry County, Illinois, USA. As of the 2020 census, its population was 413 and it contained 193 housing units.

== Geography ==
According to the 2021 census gazetteer files, Weller Township has a total area of 34.37 square miles (89.02 km^{2}), of which 34.36 square miles (88.99 km^{2}) (or 99.97%) is land and 0.01 square miles (0.03 km^{2}) (or 0.03%) is water.

=== Cities, towns, villages ===
- Bishop Hill

=== Unincorporated towns ===
- Nekoma at 41.172815°N 90.188731°W

(This list is based on USGS data and may include former settlements.)

=== Adjacent townships ===
- Cambridge Township (north)
- Galva Township (east)
- Lynn Township, Knox County (southeast)
- Walnut Grove Township, Knox County (south)
- Ontario Township, Knox County (southwest)
- Clover Township (west)
- Andover Township (northwest)

=== Cemeteries ===
The township contains these three cemeteries: Bishop Hill, Piatt and Red Oak.

=== Major highways ===
- U.S. Route 34
- Illinois Route 17
- Illinois Route 82

== Demographics ==
As of the 2020 census there were 413 people, 202 households, and 97 families residing in the township. The population density was 12.02 inhabitants per square mile (4.64/km^{2}). There were 193 housing units at an average density of 5.62 per square mile (2.17/km^{2}). The racial makeup of the township was 94.67% White, 0.48% African American, 0.00% Native American, 0.24% Asian, 0.00% Pacific Islander, 0.24% from other races, and 4.36% from two or more races. Hispanic or Latino of any race were 0.24% of the population.

There were 202 households, out of which 21.80% had children under the age of 18 living with them, 45.05% were married couples living together, 2.97% had a female householder with no spouse present, and 51.98% were non-families. 51.00% of all households were made up of individuals, and 36.60% had someone living alone who was 65 years of age or older. The average household size was 2.02 and the average family size was 3.10.

The township's age distribution consisted of 17.6% under the age of 18, 8.6% from 18 to 24, 18.5% from 25 to 44, 24.7% from 45 to 64, and 30.6% who were 65 years of age or older. The median age was 51.8 years. For every 100 females, there were 105.5 males. For every 100 females age 18 and over, there were 97.1 males.

The median income for a household in the township was $36,087, and the median income for a family was $84,659. Males had a median income of $36,111 versus $19,542 for females. The per capita income for the township was $29,536. About 0.0% of families and 3.4% of the population were below the poverty line, including 0.0% of those under age 18 and 7.2% of those age 65 or over.

Historical population
Census	Pop.	Note	%±
2000	474		—
2010	422		−11.0%
2020	413		−2.1%
U.S. Decennial Census

== School districts ==
- Alwood Community Unit School District 225
- Cambridge Community Unit School District 227
- Galva Community Unit School District 224
- R O W V A Community Unit School District 208

== Political districts ==
- Illinois's 17th congressional district
- State House District 74
- State Senate District 37
