= Wethersfield Township, Henry County, Illinois =

Wethersfield Township
- Township
- Location in Henry County

- Henry County's location in Illinois
- Coordinates: 41°11′32″N 89°55′26″W
- Country: United States
- State: Illinois
- County: Henry
- Established: November 4, 1836

Area
  - Total: 35.56 sq mi (92.1 km^{2})
  - Land: 35.56 sq mi (92.1 km^{2})
  - Water: 0 sq mi (0 km^{2}) 0%
- Elevation: 820 ft (250 m)

Population (2020)
  - Total: 3,792
  - Density: 106.6/sq mi (41.17/km^{2})
- Time zone: UTC-6 (CST)
  - Summer (DST): UTC-5 (CDT)
- ZIP codes: 61434, 61443
- FIPS code: 17-073-80983

Wethersfield Township is one of twenty-four townships in Henry County, Illinois, USA. As of the 2020 census, its population was 3,792 and contained 1,840 housing units.

== Geography ==
According to the 2021 census gazetteer files, Wethersfield Township has a total area of 35.56 square miles (92.10 km^{2}), all land.

=== Cities, towns, villages ===
- Kewanee (southwest quarter)

=== Extinct towns ===
- Saxon at 41.152259°N 89.892052°W

(These towns are listed as "historical" by the USGS.)

- Wethersfield at 41.227259°N 89.925663°W

=== Adjacent townships ===
- Kewanee Township (north)
- Elmira Township, Stark County (east)
- Toulon Township, Stark County (southeast)
- Goshen Township, Stark County (south)
- Lynn Township, Knox County (southwest)
- Galva Township (west)
- Burns Township (northwest)

=== Cemeteries ===
The township contains these four cemeteries: Cavanagh, Evergreen Memory Garden, Saxon and Wethersfield.

=== Major highways ===
- U.S. Route 34
- Illinois Route 78

=== Airports and landing strips ===
- Kewanee Municipal Airport

=== Landmarks ===
- Windmont Park

== Demographics ==
As of the 2020 census there were 3,792 people, 1,537 households, and 1,030 families residing in the township. The population density was 106.63 inhabitants per square mile (41.17/km^{2}). There were 1,840 housing units at an average density of 51.74 per square mile (19.98/km^{2}). The racial makeup of the township was 87.05% White, 3.35% African American, 0.37% Native American, 0.76% Asian, 0.00% Pacific Islander, 3.98% from other races, and 4.48% from two or more races. Hispanic or Latino of any race were 7.73% of the population.

There were 1,537 households, out of which 22.20% had children under the age of 18 living with them, 54.98% were married couples living together, 8.98% had a female householder with no spouse present, and 32.99% were non-families. 28.60% of all households were made up of individuals, and 21.10% had someone living alone who was 65 years of age or older. The average household size was 2.31 and the average family size was 2.85.

The township's age distribution consisted of 12.7% under the age of 18, 11.7% from 18 to 24, 18.9% from 25 to 44, 30.6% from 45 to 64, and 25.9% who were 65 years of age or older. The median age was 52.0 years. For every 100 females, there were 80.6 males. For every 100 females age 18 and over, there were 82.4 males.

The median income for a household in the township was $55,104, and the median income for a family was $61,600. Males had a median income of $43,274 versus $29,167 for females. The per capita income for the township was $28,418. About 1.7% of families and 5.2% of the population were below the poverty line, including 0.0% of those under age 18 and 13.0% of those age 65 or over.

Historical population
| Census | Pop. | Note | %± |
|---|---|---|---|
| 2000 | 3,845 | | — |
| 2010 | 3,935 | | 2.3% |
| 2020 | 3,792 | | −3.6% |
U.S. Decennial Census

== School districts ==
- Galva Community Unit School District 224
- Stark County Community Unit School District 100
- Wethersfield Community Unit School District 230

== Political districts ==
- Illinois's 17th congressional district
- State House District 74
- State Senate District 37
