= Alba Township, Henry County, Illinois =

Alba Township
- Township
- Location in Henry County

- Henry County's location in Illinois
- Coordinates: 41°27′23″N 89°54′47″W
- Country: United States
- State: Illinois
- County: Henry
- Established: November 4, 1856

Area
  - Total: 36.09 sq mi (93.5 km^{2})
  - Land: 36.01 sq mi (93.3 km^{2})
  - Water: 0.08 sq mi (0.21 km^{2}) 0.22%
- Elevation: 640 ft (195 m)

Population (2020)
  - Total: 173
  - Density: 6.1/sq mi (2.4/km^{2})
- Time zone: UTC-6 (CST)
  - Summer (DST): UTC-5 (CDT)
- ZIP codes: 61234, 61235, 61277
- FIPS code: 17-073-00503

Alba Township is one of twenty-four townships in Henry County, Illinois, USA. As of the 2020 census, its population was 173 and it contained 90 housing units. Alba Township changed its name from Elba Township on April 13, 1857. The name may be derived from Elba, New York, the native home of a share of the early settlers.

== Geography ==
According to the 2021 census gazetteer files, Alba Township has a total area of 36.02 square miles (93.29 km^{2}), of which 35.94 square miles (93.08 km^{2}) (or 99.77%) is land and 0.08 square miles (0.21 km^{2}) (or 0.23%) is water.

=== Extinct towns ===
- Kedron at 41.468368°N 89.876495°W

(These towns are listed as "historical" by the USGS.)

=== Adjacent townships ===
- Yorktown Township (north)
- Fairfield Township, Bureau County (northeast)
- Gold Township, Bureau County (east)
- Mineral Township, Bureau County (southeast)
- Annawan Township (south)
- Cornwall Township (southwest)
- Atkinson Township (west)
- Loraine Township (northwest)

=== Cemeteries ===
The township contains these three cemeteries: Goble, Maple Grove and Sacred Heart.

=== Major highways ===
- Interstate 80
- Illinois Route 78

=== Airports and landing strips ===
- Thompson Airport

=== Landmarks ===
- Hennepin Canal Parkway State Park (east half)

== Demographics ==
As of the 2020 census there were 173 people, 88 households, and 66 families residing in the township. The population density was 4.80 inhabitants per square mile (1.85/km^{2}). There were 90 housing units at an average density of 2.50 per square mile (0.97/km^{2}). The racial makeup of the township was 96.53% White, 0.58% African American, 0.00% Native American, 0.58% Asian, 0.00% Pacific Islander, 0.58% from other races, and 1.73% from two or more races. Hispanic or Latino of any race were 1.16% of the population.

There were 88 households, out of which 30.70% had children under the age of 18 living with them, 73.86% were married couples living together, 1.14% had a female householder with no spouse present, and 25.00% were non-families. 25.00% of all households were made up of individuals, and 12.50% had someone living alone who was 65 years of age or older. The average household size was 2.33 and the average family size was 2.77.

The township's age distribution consisted of 23.4% under the age of 18, 0.0% from 18 to 24, 29.8% from 25 to 44, 19.5% from 45 to 64, and 27.3% who were 65 years of age or older. The median age was 38.8 years. For every 100 females, there were 99.0 males. For every 100 females age 18 and over, there were 96.3 males.

The median income for a household in the township was $85,093, and the median income for a family was $85,741. Males had a median income of $75,893 versus $46,250 for females. The per capita income for the township was $34,959. No families and 1.5% of the population were below the poverty line, including none of those under age 18 and 5.4% of those age 65 or over.

Historical population
Census	Pop.	Note	%±
2000	190		—
2010	220		15.8%
2020	173		−21.4%
U.S. Decennial Census

== School districts ==
- Annawan Community Unit School District 226

== Political districts ==
- Illinois's 14th congressional district
- State House District 90
- State Senate District 45
