= Mud Creek (Henry County, Illinois) =

Coordinates: 41°25′49″N 89°56′20″W

Mud Creek is a rural creek that forms from a small canal that connects the Hennepin Canal and the Green River in Eastern Henry County, Illinois and flows southeast for about 15 miles (24 km) to west of Neponset, Illinois. The creek's main purpose is for farmland drainage.

== Fishing and recreation ==
Mud Creek is used for fishing by some locals who live nearby. The creek is very well known throughout the area and is used as a natural landmark to people of Annawan and Kewanee, Illinois. The Carol M. Guthrie 5 Kilometer (3.5 mile) run's turn around point is Mud Creek.
