= Nekoma =

Nekoma is the name of three communities in the United States:

- Nekoma, Illinois
- Nekoma, Kansas
- Nekoma, North Dakota
