= Mineral, Illinois =

Village of Mineral
- Village
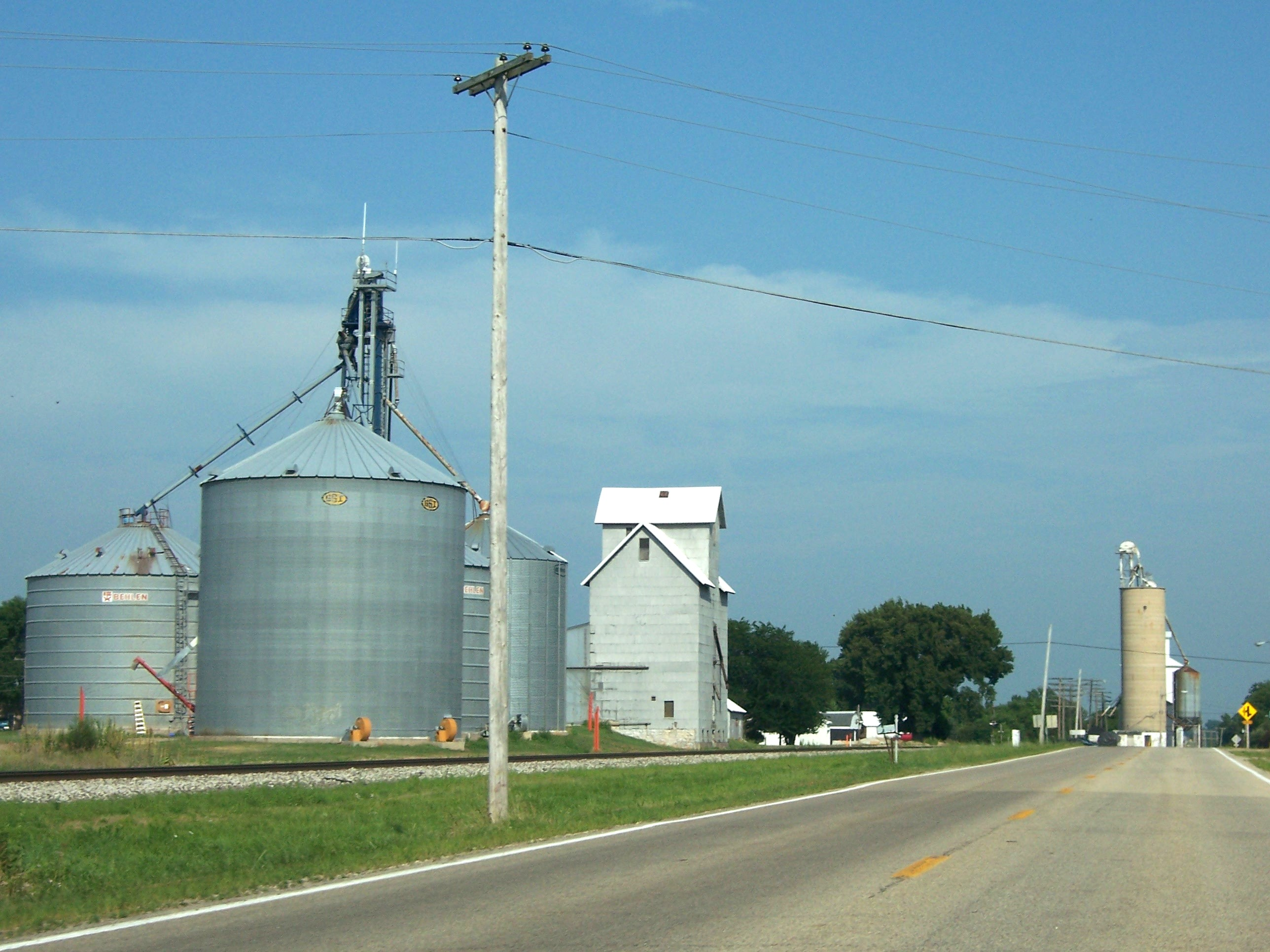
- Grain elevator in Mineral

- Location of Mineral in Bureau County, Illinois.
- Coordinates: 41°22′56″N 89°50′11″W
- Country: United States
- State: Illinois
- County: Bureau
- Township: Mineral

Area
  - Total: 0.553 sq mi (1.43 km^{2})
  - Water: 0.00 sq mi (0 km^{2})
- Elevation: 640 ft (200 m)

Population (2020)
  - Total: 206
  - Density: 373/sq mi (144/km^{2})
- Time zone: UTC-6 (CST)
  - Summer (DST): UTC-5 (CDT)
- Zip Code: 61344
- Area code: 309
- FIPS code: 17-49516
- GNIS feature ID: 2399370

Mineral is a village in Bureau County, Illinois, United States. The population was 206 at the 2020 census, down from 237 at the 2010 census. It is part of the Ottawa Micropolitan Statistical Area.

== History ==
The area in which Mineral is located was first settled in the early 1830s. The land just south of the current village was found to be ripe with coal. Several mines were open until strip mining became a commonly practiced way to retrieve coal from the ground.

The population of the township of Mineral (so named because of its rich coal supply) became populated to the point of where it was officially organized in 1850. As the train tracks were laid north of the coal mining area, so brought the formation of the town of Mineral. The town of Mineral was platted in 1857 and soon developed several small stores and a population of 300 to 350 residents.

A school was erected in 1870, with the town's first graduating high school class being the class of 1894, with three students earning their diplomas. The year 1907 brought the completion of the Hennepin Canal to the north of Mineral. The canal's practical use was outdated by its completion due to the vast developments in the train industry. The Hennepin Canal continues to function as a fishing and boating area.

In 1919, the Mineral School building was destroyed by fire. The school district was organized and determined to rebuild. In 1922, a new two-story brick school building was built on the northwest side of town. This school was built to handle grades 1 - 12 and included a gymnasium complete with a stage and balcony area. During this time, Mineral continued to grow at a steady pace. Though the town's population is said to have never exceeded 350 people, the town was able to support several small businesses, allowing the residents to have all they needed within walking distance of their homes. The creation of U.S. Route 6, which passed through Mineral, was also an asset to the town, bringing in visitors from all over the country.

Mineral enjoyed great successes through the 1930s, 1940s, and 1950s, continuing to support its own school system and several small businesses including, at one time, three gas stations, three restaurant/taverns, an upholstery store, a motel, two grain elevators, two churches, a lumber yard, two grocery stores, a bank, a volunteer fire department, a library, a barbershop, a beauty shop, an ice cream parlor and Mineral High School.

In 1961, the high school was closed due to a lack of sufficient enrollment. The Mineral School District agreed to an annexation effort into the Annawan School District. The Mineral School building continued to serve as a grade school for the Annawan School District until 1974, when its services as a school were ceased for good.

The creation of I-80 to the north of Mineral in the 1960s resulted in a decline in Mineral, as traffic that previously traveled through town now took the quicker I-80 route.

Today Mineral still supports a grain elevator, a restaurant/tavern, a library, a new post office, a Methodist Church, a volunteer Fire Department, and a trucking business. The old school building has been razed. A new ethanol plant is being built just two miles west of town and is bringing hope for a resurgence in population for the area.

== Geography ==
According to the 2021 census gazetteer files, Mineral has a total area of 0.55 square miles (1.42 km^{2}), all land.

== Demographics ==
Historical population
Census	Pop.	Note	%±
1880	173		—
1890	188		8.7%
1900	339		80.3%
1910	349		2.9%
1920	308		−11.7%
1930	266		−13.6%
1940	307		15.4%
1950	274		−10.7%
1960	330		20.4%
1970	286		−13.3%
1980	325		13.6%
1990	250		−23.1%
2000	272		8.8%
2010	237		−12.9%
2020	206		−13.1%
U.S. Decennial Census

As of the 2020 census there were 206 people, 105 households, and 56 families residing in the village. The population density was 372.51 inhabitants per square mile (143.83/km^{2}). There were 110 housing units at an average density of 198.92 per square mile (76.80/km^{2}). The racial makeup of the village was 89.32% White, 2.91% African American, 0.49% Native American, and 7.28% from two or more races. Hispanic or Latino of any race were 1.94% of the population.

There were 105 households, out of which 22.9% had children under the age of 18 living with them, 33.33% were married couples living together, 8.57% had a female householder with no husband present, and 46.67% were non-families. 45.71% of all households were made up of individuals, and 24.76% had someone living alone who was 65 years of age or older. The average household size was 2.96 and the average family size was 2.09.

The village's age distribution consisted of 21.5% under the age of 18, 10.0% from 18 to 24, 23.7% from 25 to 44, 27.8% from 45 to 64, and 16.9% who were 65 years of age or older. The median age was 41.1 years. For every 100 females, there were 133.0 males. For every 100 females age 18 and over, there were 117.7 males.

The median income for a household in the village was $38,125, and the median income for a family was $59,583. Males had a median income of $36,750 versus $18,125 for females. The per capita income for the village was $22,874. About 12.5% of families and 12.3% of the population were below the poverty line, including 29.8% of those under age 18 and 5.4% of those age 65 or over.

== Education ==
It is in the Annawan Community Unit School District 226.

== Notable people ==
- Hiram Boardman Conibear, rowing coach
- Jaclyn Hill, YouTube personality
