= Cornwall Township, Henry County, Illinois =

Cornwall Township
- Township
- Location in Henry County

- Henry County's location in Illinois
- Coordinates: 41°21′59″N 90°01′47″W
- Country: United States
- State: Illinois
- County: Henry
- Established: November 4, 1856

Area
  - Total: 35.68 sq mi (92.4 km^{2})
  - Land: 35.59 sq mi (92.2 km^{2})
  - Water: 0.09 sq mi (0.23 km^{2}) 0.26%
- Elevation: 659 ft (201 m)

Population (2020)
  - Total: 222
  - Density: 6.24/sq mi (2.41/km^{2})
- Time zone: UTC−6 (CST)
  - Summer (DST): UTC−5 (CDT)
- ZIP codes: 61234, 61235, 61238, 61254, 61443
- FIPS code: 17-073-16444

Cornwall Township is one of twenty-four townships in Henry County, Illinois, US. At the 2020 census, its population was 222 and it contained 110 housing units.

== Geography ==
According to the 2021 census gazetteer files, Cornwall Township has a total area of 35.68 square miles (92.41 km^{2}), of which 35.59 square miles (92.18 km^{2}) (or 99.74%) is land and 0.09 square miles (0.23 km^{2}) (or 0.26%) is water.

=== Cities, towns, villages ===
- Atkinson (partial)

=== Adjacent townships ===
- Atkinson Township (north)
- Alba Township (northeast)
- Annawan Township (east)
- Kewanee Township (southeast)
- Burns Township (south)
- Cambridge Township (southwest)
- Munson Township (west)
- Geneseo Township (northwest)

=== Cemeteries ===
The township contains these three cemeteries: Grand View, Liberty and Saint Anthony.

=== Major highways ===
- Interstate 80
- U.S. Route 6

== Demographics ==
As of the 2020 census there were 222 people, 100 households, and 91 families residing in the township. The population density was 6.22 inhabitants per square mile (2.40/km^{2}). There were 110 housing units at an average density of 3.08 per square mile (1.19/km^{2}). The racial makeup of the township was 95.95% White, 0.00% African American, 0.00% Native American, 0.90% Asian, 0.00% Pacific Islander, 0.90% from other races, and 2.25% from two or more races. Hispanic or Latino of any race were 1.35% of the population.

There were 100 households, out of which 60.00% had children under the age of 18 living with them, 91.00% were married couples living together, none had a female householder with no spouse present, and 9.00% were non-families. 9.00% of all households were made up of individuals, and 4.00% had someone living alone who was 65 years of age or older. The average household size was 3.04 and the average family size was 3.24.

The township's age distribution consisted of 34.2% under the age of 18, 0.0% from 18 to 24, 34.5% from 25 to 44, 15.8% from 45 to 64, and 15.5% who were 65 years of age or older. The median age was 41.6 years. For every 100 females, there were 88.8 males. For every 100 females age 18 and over, there were 100.0 males.

The median income for a household in the township was $132,000, and the median income for a family was $132,986. Males had a median income of $100,875 versus $32,361 for females. The per capita income for the township was $44,573. None of the population was below the poverty line.

Historical population
Census	Pop.	Note	%±
2010	278		—
2020	222		−20.1%
U.S. Decennial Census

== School districts ==
- Annawan Community Unit School District 226
- Cambridge Community Unit School District 227
- Geneseo Community Unit School District 228
- Kewanee Community Unit School District 229

== Political districts ==
- Illinois's 14th congressional district
- State House District 74
- State Senate District 37

== Notable people ==
- Art Benedict, baseball player (MLB second baseman for the Philadelphia Quakers)
- Joe McGinnity, baseball player (MLB Hall of Fame pitcher for the Baltimore Orioles, Brooklyn Superbas and New York Giants)
