= Cambridge Township, Henry County, Illinois =

Cambridge Township
- Township
- Location in Henry County

- Henry County's location in Illinois
- Coordinates: 41°16′46″N 90°08′51″W
- Country: United States
- State: Illinois
- County: Henry
- Established: November 4, 1856

Area
  - Total: 36.95 sq mi (95.7 km^{2})
  - Land: 36.93 sq mi (95.6 km^{2})
  - Water: 0.02 sq mi (0.052 km^{2}) 0.05%
- Elevation: 712 ft (217 m)

Population (2020)
  - Total: 2,405
  - Density: 65.12/sq mi (25.14/km^{2})
- Time zone: UTC-6 (CST)
  - Summer (DST): UTC-5 (CDT)
- ZIP codes: 61238, 61434
- FIPS code: 17-073-10656

Cambridge Township is one of twenty-four townships in Henry County, Illinois, USA. As of the 2020 census, its population was 2,405 and it contained 1,059 housing units.

== Geography ==
According to the 2021 census gazetteer files, Cambridge Township has a total area of 36.95 square miles (95.70 km^{2}), of which 36.93 square miles (95.65 km^{2}) (or 99.95%) is land and 0.02 square miles (0.05 km^{2}) (or 0.05%) is water.

=== Cities, towns, villages ===
- Cambridge

=== Unincorporated towns ===
- Ulah at 41.269203°N 90.146228°W

(This list is based on USGS data and may include former settlements.)

=== Adjacent townships ===
- Munson Township (north)
- Cornwall Township (northeast)
- Burns Township (east)
- Galva Township (southeast)
- Weller Township (south)
- Andover Township (west)
- Osco Township (northwest)

=== Cemeteries ===
The township contains these two cemeteries: McNay and Talbot.

=== Major highways ===
- Illinois Route 81
- Illinois Route 82

== Demographics ==
As of the 2020 census there were 2,405 people, 915 households, and 667 families residing in the township. The population density was 65.10 inhabitants per square mile (25.14/km^{2}). There were 1,059 housing units at an average density of 28.66 per square mile (11.07/km^{2}). The racial makeup of the township was 93.93% White, 0.54% African American, 0.21% Native American, 0.25% Asian, 0.00% Pacific Islander, 0.33% from other races, and 4.74% from two or more races. Hispanic or Latino of any race were 2.20% of the population.

There were 915 households, out of which 35.70% had children under the age of 18 living with them, 58.36% were married couples living together, 7.98% had a female householder with no spouse present, and 27.10% were non-families. 23.60% of all households were made up of individuals, and 8.50% had someone living alone who was 65 years of age or older. The average household size was 2.56 and the average family size was 2.87.

The township's age distribution consisted of 20.1% under the age of 18, 9.4% from 18 to 24, 24% from 25 to 44, 28.9% from 45 to 64, and 17.7% who were 65 years of age or older. The median age was 42.1 years. For every 100 females, there were 118.3 males. For every 100 females age 18 and over, there were 114.2 males.

The median income for a household in the township was $60,417, and the median income for a family was $75,491. Males had a median income of $43,450 versus $23,417 for females. The per capita income for the township was $29,631. About 3.9% of families and 5.6% of the population were below the poverty line, including 5.4% of those under age 18 and 3.9% of those age 65 or over.

Historical population
Census	Pop.	Note	%±
2000	2,677		—
2010	2,525		−5.7%
2020	2,405		−4.8%
U.S. Decennial Census

== School districts ==
- Cambridge Community Unit School District 227
- Galva Community Unit School District 224

== Political districts ==
- Illinois's 14th congressional district
- State House District 74
- State Senate District 37
