= Burns Township, Henry County, Illinois =

Burns Township
- Township
- Location in Henry County

- Henry County's location in Illinois
- Coordinates: 41°16′40″N 90°01′38″W
- Country: United States
- State: Illinois
- County: Henry
- Established: November 4, 1856

Area
  - Total: 36.46 sq mi (94.4 km^{2})
  - Land: 36.46 sq mi (94.4 km^{2})
  - Water: 0 sq mi (0 km^{2}) 0%
- Elevation: 761 ft (232 m)

Population (2020)
  - Total: 248
  - Density: 6.80/sq mi (2.63/km^{2})
- Time zone: UTC-6 (CST)
  - Summer (DST): UTC-5 (CDT)
- ZIP codes: 61235, 61238, 61434, 61443
- FIPS code: 17-073-09824

Burns Township is one of twenty-four townships in Henry County, Illinois, USA. As of the 2020 census, its population was 248 and it contained 122 housing units.

== Geography ==
According to the 2021 census gazetteer files, Burns Township has a total area of 36.46 square miles (94.43 km^{2}), all land.

=== Unincorporated towns ===
- German Corner at 41.293647°N 90.030946°W

(This list is based on USGS data and may include former settlements.)

=== Adjacent townships ===
- Cornwall Township (north)
- Annawan Township (northeast)
- Kewanee Township (east)
- Wethersfield Township (southeast)
- Galva Township (south)
- Cambridge Township (west)
- Munson Township (northwest)

=== Cemeteries ===
The township contains these two cemeteries: Cosner and Mount Zion.

=== Major highways ===
- Illinois Route 81

== Demographics ==
As of the 2020 census there were 248 people, 78 households, and 44 families residing in the township. The population density was 6.80 inhabitants per square mile (2.63/km^{2}). There were 122 housing units at an average density of 3.35 per square mile (1.29/km^{2}). The racial makeup of the township was 95.16% White, 0.00% African American, 0.00% Native American, 0.00% Asian, 0.00% Pacific Islander, 0.00% from other races, and 4.84% from two or more races. Hispanic or Latino of any race were 1.61% of the population.

There were 78 households, out of which 16.70% had children under the age of 18 living with them, 39.74% were married couples living together, 0.00% had a female householder with no spouse present, and 43.59% were non-families. 38.50% of all households were made up of individuals, and 25.60% had someone living alone who was 65 years of age or older. The average household size was 2.33 and the average family size was 3.20.

The township's age distribution consisted of 11.5% under the age of 18, 0.0% from 18 to 24, 19.7% from 25 to 44, 8.2% from 45 to 64, and 60.4% who were 65 years of age or older. The median age was 71.1 years. For every 100 females, there were 85.7 males. For every 100 females age 18 and over, there were 109.1 males.

The median income for a household in the township was $34,412, and the median income for a family was $78,750. The per capita income for the township was $25,742. About 0.0% of families and 7.1% of the population were below the poverty line, including 0.0% of those under age 18 and 0.0% of those age 65 or over.

Historical population
| Census | Pop. | Note | %± |
|---|---|---|---|
| 2000 | 307 | | — |
| 2010 | 265 | | −13.7% |
| 2020 | 248 | | −6.4% |
U.S. Decennial Census

== School districts ==
- Annawan Community Unit School District 226
- Cambridge Community Unit School District 227
- Galva Community Unit School District 224
- Kewanee Community Unit School District 229
- Wethersfield Community Unit School District 230

== Political districts ==
- Illinois's 14th congressional district
- State House District 74
- State Senate District 37
