= Munson Township, Henry County, Illinois =

Munson Township
- Township
- Location in Henry County

- Henry County's location in Illinois
- Coordinates: 41°21′57″N 90°08′48″W
- Country: United States
- State: Illinois
- County: Henry
- Established: November 4, 1856

Area
  - Total: 35.94 sq mi (93.1 km^{2})
  - Land: 35.94 sq mi (93.1 km^{2})
  - Water: 0 sq mi (0 km^{2}) 0%
- Elevation: 741 ft (226 m)

Population (2020)
  - Total: 385
  - Density: 10.7/sq mi (4.14/km^{2})
- Time zone: UTC-6 (CST)
  - Summer (DST): UTC-5 (CDT)
- ZIP codes: 61235, 61238, 61254
- FIPS code: 17-073-51388

Munson Township is one of twenty-four townships in Henry County, Illinois, USA. As of the 2020 census, its population was 385 and it contained 127 housing units. Munson changed its name from Centre township on April 13, 1857.

== Geography ==
According to the 2021 census gazetteer files, Munson Township has a total area of 35.94 square miles (93.08 km^{2}), all land.

=== Adjacent townships ===
- Geneseo Township (north)
- Atkinson Township (northeast)
- Cornwall Township (east)
- Burns Township (southeast)
- Cambridge Township (south)
- Andover Township (southwest)
- Osco Township (west)

=== Cemeteries ===
The township contains these two cemeteries: Greenlee and Munson.

=== Major highways ===
- Illinois Route 82

== Demographics ==
As of the 2020 census there were 385 people, 75 households, and 45 families residing in the township. The population density was 10.71 inhabitants per square mile (4.14/km^{2}). There were 127 housing units at an average density of 3.53 per square mile (1.36/km^{2}). The racial makeup of the township was 98.44% White, 0.00% African American, 0.00% Native American, 0.26% Asian, 0.00% Pacific Islander, 0.26% from other races, and 1.04% from two or more races. Hispanic or Latino of any race were 0.52% of the population.

There were 75 households, out of which 14.70% had children under the age of 18 living with them, 56.00% were married couples living together, 0.00% had a female householder with no spouse present, and 40.00% were non-families. 40.00% of all households were made up of individuals, and 16.00% had someone living alone who was 65 years of age or older. The average household size was 2.71 and the average family size was 3.84.

The township's age distribution consisted of 22.8% under the age of 18, 0.0% from 18 to 24, 16.6% from 25 to 44, 17.8% from 45 to 64, and 42.7% who were 65 years of age or older. The median age was 57.7 years. For every 100 females, there were 107.4 males. For every 100 females age 18 and over, there were 60.1 males.

The median income for a household in the township was $63,958, and the median income for a family was $72,750. Males had a median income of $46,786 versus $50,179 for females. The per capita income for the township was $20,482. About 17.8% of families and 25.1% of the population were below the poverty line, including 40.0% of those under age 18 and 11.6% of those age 65 or over.

Historical population
Census	Pop.	Note	%±
2000	514		—
2010	400		−22.2%
2020	385		−3.7%
U.S. Decennial Census

== School districts ==
- Cambridge Community Unit School District 227
- Geneseo Community Unit School District 228

== Political districts ==
- Illinois's 14th congressional district
- State House District 71
- State House District 74
- State Senate District 36
- State Senate District 37
