= Johnson-Sauk Trail State Recreation Area =

State Park in Illinois, US

- IUCN category III (natural monument or feature)
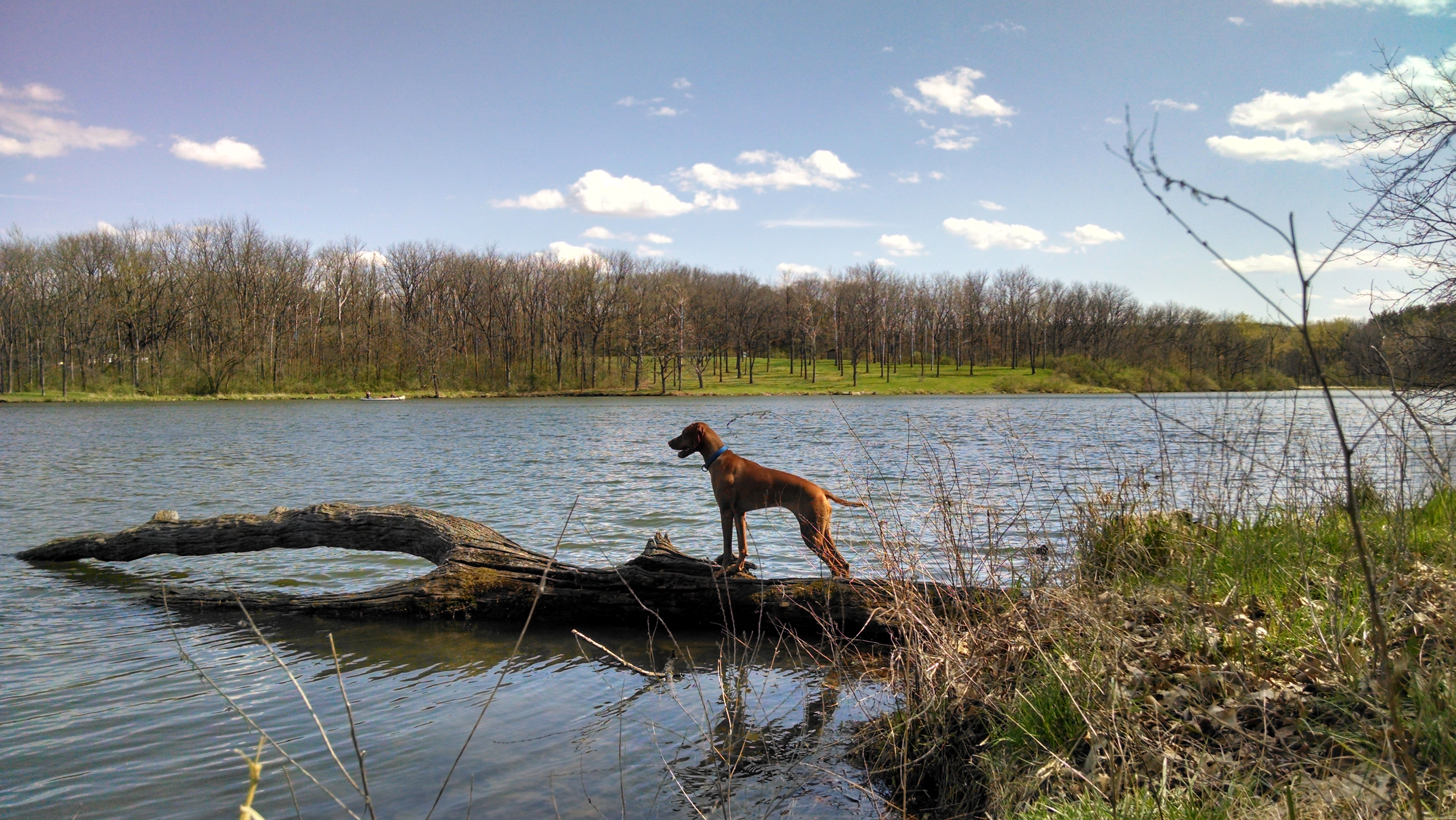

- Location within Illinois Location within the United States
- Location: Henry County, Illinois, USA
- Nearest city: Annawan, Illinois
- Coordinates: 41°19′17″N 89°53′25″W
- Area: 1,365 acres (552 ha)
- Governing body: Illinois Department of Natural Resources

Johnson-Sauk Trail State Recreation Area is an Illinois state park on 1,365 acres (552 ha) in Henry County, Illinois, United States. The park also has a 58-acre (23 ha) lake (Johnson Lake) with various types of fish. The lake has boat rentals and a maximum depth of 21 feet (6.4 m). The park has many trails, and a campground. Ryan's round barn has a tour every year in the park. Near the round barn, is a scenic 3-acre (1.2 ha) pond.
