= Art Benedict =

American baseball player (1862–1948)

- Second baseman
- Born: March 31, 1862; Cornwall, Illinois, U.S.
- Died: January 14, 1948 (aged 85); Denver, Colorado, U.S.
- Batted: Right Threw: Right

MLB debut
- May 14, 1883, for the Philadelphia Quakers

Last MLB appearance
- June 6, 1883, for the Philadelphia Quakers

MLB statistics
- Games played: 3
- At bats: 15
- Hits: 4
- Stats at Baseball Reference

Teams
- Philadelphia Quakers (1883)

Arthur Melville Benedict (March 31, 1862 – January 14, 1948) was an American National League second baseman. Benedict played for the Philadelphia Quakers in the 1883 season. In three career games, he had 4 hits in 15 at-bats, with 4 RBIs. He batted and threw right-handed.

Benedict was born in Cornwall, Illinois and died in Denver, Colorado.
