= Hiram Conibear =

American football and rowing coach (1871–1917)

Hiram Boardman Conibear
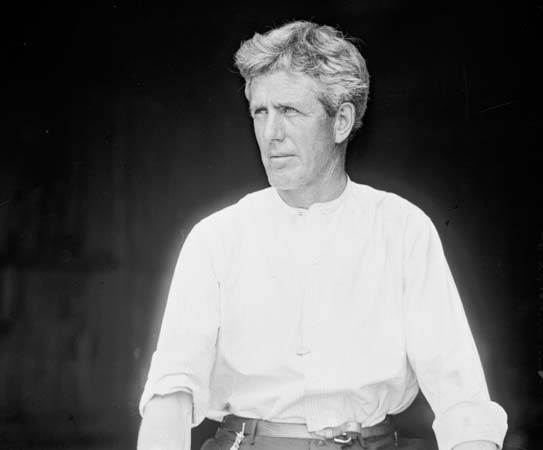
- Conibear circa 1911
- Born: September 5, 1871; Mineral, Illinois, U.S.
- Died: September 9, 1917 (aged 46); Seattle, Washington, U.S.
- Known for: Conibear stroke
- Spouse: Grace Eminent Miller (m. 1898–1917)
- Children: 1

Hiram Boardman Conibear (September 5, 1871 – September 9, 1917) was an American football and rowing coach. He served as head football coach for the University of Montana from 1903 to 1904, compiling a record of 5–7. Conibear was head rowing coach at the University of Washington from 1907 to 1917, coaching both the men's and women's rowing teams. He developed the distinctive style that became known as the Conibear stroke that "had an effect on the sport that lasted for 30 years".

== Professional career ==
Conibear studied in Mendota and Dixon, Illinois, and attended the Chautauqua School of Physical Training for four years. He was a Coach of Athletics at the University of Illinois, and was also employed by the University of Chicago, the University of Montana, and the World's Championship Baseball Team Chicago White Sox in 1906.

Conibear's early coaching career was in cycling and physical conditioning. In 1906 while at the University of Chicago, Conibear met Bill Speidel, a medical student and former Washington quarterback. Through Speidel's contacts with the Sun Dodger (later Huskies) athletic manager, Lorin Grinstead, Conibear was offered the position as Washington's athletic trainer.

As an athletics trainer at the University of Washington, Conibear accepted the post of rowing crew coach even though he had no rowing experience and knew nothing about the sport. Experiments convinced him that the traditional Oxford style of rowing, involving a long stroke, was both unsound and uncomfortable, and he developed the new, shorter style with which his name is still associated.

Under his coaching the university crew became, in 1913, the first Western crew to compete by invitation in the Intercollegiate Rowing Association regatta in Poughkeepsie, New York, and Washington crew members went on to achieve success at subsequent regattas and at national and Olympic level using the technique developed by Conibear.

== Personal life ==
Conibear was born on September 5, 1871, in Mineral, Illinois to Edward H. Conibear of Bratton Fleming, Devonshire, England, and Amelia Boardman of Stockport, Cheshire, England. The couple may have met and married after emigrating to the United States in the 1860s. Hiram had at least three brothers and one sister.

The FamilySearch genealogical database shows that Conibear married Grace Evertt Miller of Dixon, Illinois in about 1898. The couple had at least one daughter, Catherine Amelia Conibear, born December 12, 1909 in Seattle, Washington.

Conibear died from a fall from a plum tree at his home in Seattle, Washington, on September 9, 1917, at age 46. According to the Find A Grave database, the disposition of his remains is not known.

== Legacy ==
- Conibear Rowing Club
- Conibear Shellhouse

== Head coaching record ==
=== Football ===
Year	Team	Overall	Conference	Standing	Bowl/playoffs
Montana (Independent) (1903–1904)
1903	Montana	2–5			
1904	Montana	3–2			
Montana:		5–7			
Total:		5–7			

== See also ==
- History of rowing
