= Neponset, Illinois =

- Village
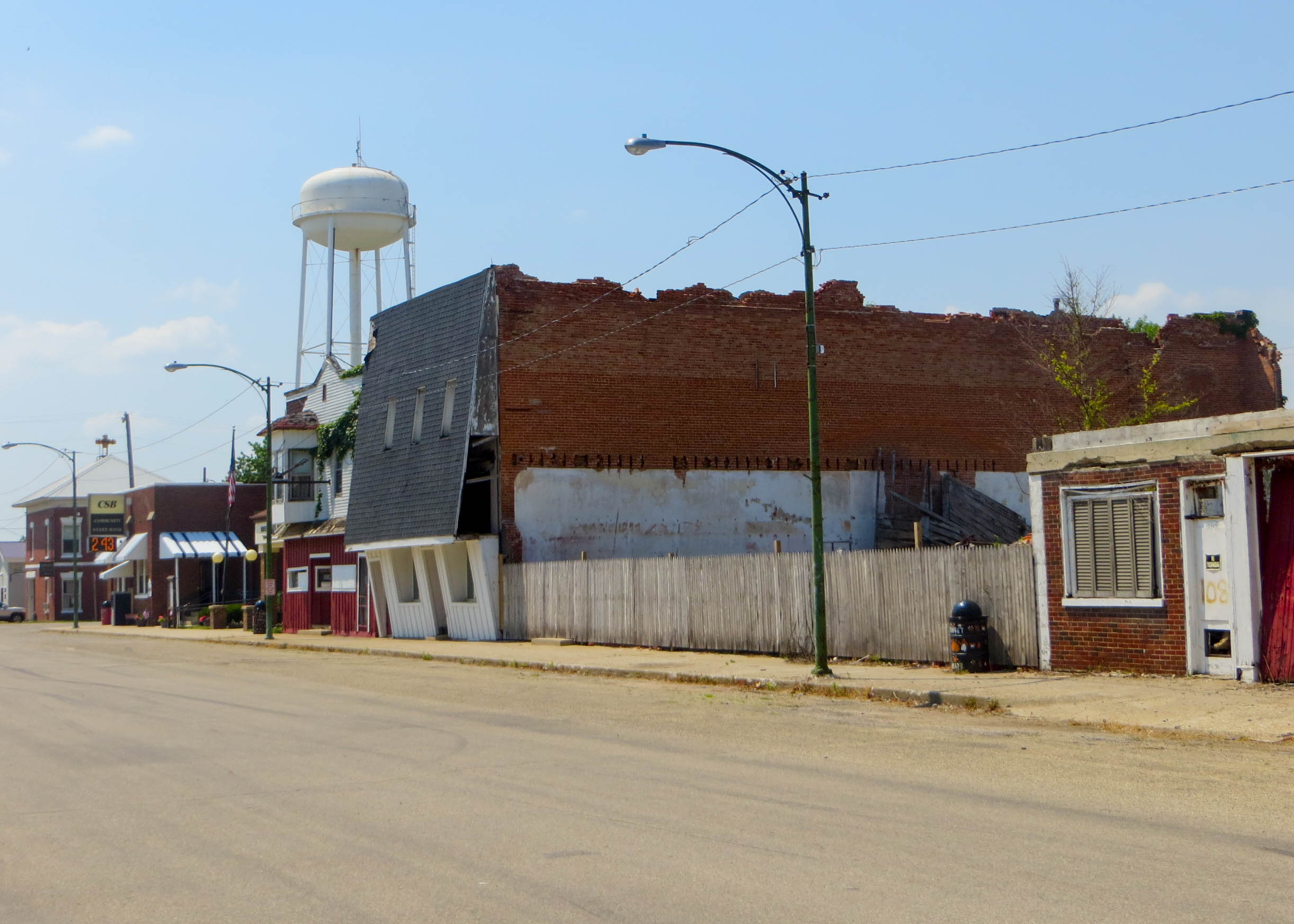
- Commercial Street in Neponset

- Location of Neponset in Bureau County, Illinois.
- Coordinates: 41°17′48″N 89°47′22″W
- Country: United States
- State: Illinois
- County: Bureau
- Township: Neponset

Area
  - Total: 1.016 sq mi (2.63 km^{2})
  - Land: 1.016 sq mi (2.63 km^{2})
  - Water: 0.00 sq mi (0 km^{2})
- Elevation: 830 ft (250 m)

Population (2020)
  - Total: 427
  - Density: 420/sq mi (162/km^{2})
- Time zone: UTC-6 (CST)
  - Summer (DST): UTC-5 (CDT)
- ZIP code: 61345
- Area code: 309
- FIPS code: 17-51999
- GNIS feature ID: 2399446
- Website: www.villageofneponsetil.org

Neponset is a village in Bureau County, Illinois, United States. The population was 427 at the 2020 census. It is part of the Ottawa Micropolitan Statistical Area.

== History ==
In 1836, English settlers William and Ann Studley were the first to arrive in the area. By 1840, additional settlers arrived, originally naming the settlement Brawby after the village they had left in England. The name was changed to Neponset in 1866, possibly named after the Neponset River in Massachusetts, where the English immigrants had arrived in the United States. Neponset incorporated as a village in 1883.

The Neponset High School was constructed in 1927 and served the community until 1999, when the Neponset School District merged with the Kewanee School District. High school aged students now largely attend Kewanee High School.

== Geography ==
According to the 2021 census gazetteer files, Neponset has a total area of 1.02 square miles (2.64 km^{2}), all land.

== Demographics ==
Historical population
Census	Pop.	Note	%±
1880	652		—
1890	542		−16.9%
1900	516		−4.8%
1910	542		5.0%
1920	476		−12.2%
1930	520		9.2%
1940	520		0.0%
1950	501		−3.7%
1960	495		−1.2%
1970	507		2.4%
1980	575		13.4%
1990	529		−8.0%
2000	519		−1.9%
2010	473		−8.9%
2020	427		−9.7%
U.S. Decennial Census

As of the 2020 census there were 427 people, 149 households, and 100 families residing in the village. The population density was 420.28 inhabitants per square mile (162.27/km^{2}). There were 193 housing units at an average density of 189.96 per square mile (73.34/km^{2}). The racial makeup of the village was 87.35% White, 1.41% African American, 0.23% Native American, 0.94% Asian, 3.98% from other races, and 6.09% from two or more races. Hispanic or Latino of any race were 6.79% of the population.

There were 149 households, out of which 28.9% had children under the age of 18 living with them, 51.01% were married couples living together, 4.70% had a female householder with no husband present, and 32.89% were non-families. 24.83% of all households were made up of individuals, and 15.44% had someone living alone who was 65 years of age or older. The average household size was 3.04 and the average family size was 2.56.

The village's age distribution consisted of 24.3% under the age of 18, 6.5% from 18 to 24, 30.1% from 25 to 44, 24.6% from 45 to 64, and 14.4% who were 65 years of age or older. The median age was 36.5 years. For every 100 females, there were 109.9 males. For every 100 females age 18 and over, there were 100.7 males.

The median income for a household in the village was $54,750, and the median income for a family was $75,000. Males had a median income of $43,125 versus $25,833 for females. The per capita income for the village was $24,529. About 9.0% of families and 20.2% of the population were below the poverty line, including 29.0% of those under age 18 and 14.5% of those age 65 or over.

== Education ==
It is in the Kewanee Community Unit School District 229.
