= Gold Township, Bureau County, Illinois =

Gold Township
- Township
- Location in Bureau County

- Bureau County's location in Illinois
- Coordinates: 41°27′49″N 89°47′50″W
- Country: United States
- State: Illinois
- County: Bureau
- Established: November 6, 1849

Area
  - Total: 36.11 sq mi (93.5 km^{2})
  - Land: 36.1 sq mi (93 km^{2})
  - Water: 0.01 sq mi (0.026 km^{2}) 0.03%
- Elevation: 614 ft (187 m)

Population (2020)
  - Total: 152
  - Density: 4.21/sq mi (1.63/km^{2})
- Time zone: UTC-6 (CST)
  - Summer (DST): UTC-5 (CDT)
- ZIP codes: 61283, 61344, 61361
- FIPS code: 17-011-30146

Gold Township is one of twenty-five townships in Bureau County, Illinois, USA. As of the 2020 census, its population was 152 and it contained 88 housing units.

== Geography ==
According to the 2010 census, the township has a total area of 36.11 square miles (93.5 km^{2}), of which 36.1 square miles (93 km^{2}) (or 99.97%) is land and 0.01 square miles (0.026 km^{2}) (or 0.03%) is water.

=== Cemeteries ===
The township contains Gold Township Cemetery.

=== Airports and landing strips ===
- Etheridge Airport

=== Landmarks ===
- Hennepin Canal Parkway State Park (southwest half)

== Demographics ==
As of the 2020 census there were 152 people, 84 households, and 70 families residing in the township. The population density was 4.21 inhabitants per square mile (1.63/km^{2}). There were 73 housing units at an average density of 2.02 per square mile (0.78/km^{2}). The racial makeup of the township was 94.08% White, 0.00% African American, 0.66% Native American, 0.00% Asian, 0.66% Pacific Islander, 1.97% from other races, and 2.63% from two or more races. Hispanic or Latino of any race were 3.29% of the population.

There were 84 households, out of which 73.80% had children under the age of 18 living with them, 73.81% were married couples living together, 9.52% had a female householder with no spouse present, and 16.67% were non-families. 10.70% of all households were made up of individuals, and 0.00% had someone living alone who was 65 years of age or older. The average household size was 3.49 and the average family size was 3.80.

The township's age distribution consisted of 37.5% under the age of 18, 0.0% from 18 to 24, 28% from 25 to 44, 26.3% from 45 to 64, and 8.2% who were 65 years of age or older. The median age was 37.8 years. For every 100 females, there were 125.4 males. For every 100 females age 18 and over, there were 84.8 males.

The median income for a household in the township was $96,034, and the median income for a family was $95,172. Males had a median income of $32,371 versus $30,625 for females. The per capita income for the township was $28,007. None of the population was below the poverty line.

Historical population
Census	Pop.	Note	%±
2010	180		—
2020	152		−15.6%
US Decennial Census

== School districts ==
- Annawan Community Unit School District 226
- Bureau Valley Community Unit School District 340

== Political districts ==
- Illinois's 14th congressional district
- State House District 74
- State Senate District 37
