= Hooppole, Illinois =

- Village
- Location of Hooppole in Henry County, Illinois.
- Coordinates: 41°31′19″N 89°54′50″W
- Country: United States
- State: Illinois
- County: Henry

Area
  - Total: 0.37 sq mi (0.96 km^{2})
  - Land: 0.37 sq mi (0.96 km^{2})
  - Water: 0 sq mi (0.00 km^{2})
- Elevation: 623 ft (190 m)

Population (2020)
  - Total: 180
  - Density: 484.0/sq mi (186.88/km^{2})
- Time zone: UTC-6 (CST)
  - Summer (DST): UTC-5 (CDT)
- ZIP code: 61258
- Area code: 815
- FIPS code: 17-36074
- GNIS feature ID: 2398539

Hooppole is a village in Henry County, Illinois, United States. The population was 180 at the 2020 census.

== Geography ==
According to the 2021 census gazetteer files, Hooppole has a total area of 0.37 square miles (0.96 km^{2}), all land.

== Demographics ==
Historical population
Census	Pop.	Note	%±
1920	381		—
1930	266		−30.2%
1940	200		−24.8%
1950	195		−2.5%
1960	227		16.4%
1970	227		0.0%
1980	235		3.5%
1990	196		−16.6%
2000	162		−17.3%
2010	204		25.9%
2020	180		−11.8%
U.S. Decennial Census

As of the 2020 census, there were 180 people, 65 households, and 34 families residing in the village. The population density was 483.87 inhabitants per square mile (186.82/km^{2}). There were 77 housing units at an average density of 206.99 per square mile (79.92/km^{2}). The racial makeup of the village was 93.89% White, 0.56% African American, 0.00% Native American, 0.00% Asian, 0.00% Pacific Islander, 4.44% from other races, and 1.11% from two or more races. Hispanics or Latinos of any race were 3.89% of the population.

There were 65 households, of which 20.0% had children under 18 living with them, 50.77% were married couples, 1.54% had a female householder with no husband present, and 47.69% were non-families. 43.08% of all households comprised individuals, and 1.54% had someone 65 years or older living alone. The average household size was 3.03. and the average family size was 2.74.

The village's age distribution consisted of 11.2% under 18, 2.2% from 18 to 24, 30.3% from 25 to 44, 41% from 45 to 64, and 15.2% who were 65 years of age or older. The median age was 52.2 years. For every 100 females, there were 137.3 males. For every 100 females age 18 and over, there were 132.4 males.

The median income for a household in the village was $37,917. Males had a median income of $36,193 versus $2,499 for females. The per capita income for the village was $19,484. About 23.5% of families and 41.9% of the population were below the poverty line, including 66.7% of those under age 18 and none aged 65 or over.

== Religion ==
Two churches are located in the village: the Calvary Evangelical Church and the Zion United Methodist Church, both on Main St. The Shrine of St. Mary of the Fields is in a rural area two miles northwest of Hooppole. It is one of several Shrines to the Rosary and to the Blessed Virgin Mary for the Roman Catholic Diocese of Peoria.

== Education ==
It is in the Annawan Community Unit School District 226.
