= Nekoma, Illinois =

- Unincorporated community
- Location within Illinois Location within the United States
- Coordinates: 41°10′22″N 90°11′19″W
- Country: US
- State: Illinois
- County: Henry County
- Township: Weller Township

Area
  - Total: 0.13 sq mi (0.34 km^{2})
  - Land: 0.13 sq mi (0.34 km^{2})
  - Water: 0 sq mi (0.00 km^{2})
- Elevation: 817 ft (249 m)

Population (2020)
  - Total: 23
  - Density: 176.2/sq mi (68.03/km^{2})
- Time zone: UTC-6 (CST)
  - Summer (DST): UTC-5 (CDT)
- ZIP code: 61490
- GNIS feature ID: 2806533
- FIPS code: 17-51934

Nekoma is a census-designated place in Weller Township, Henry County, Illinois, United States. As of the 2020 census, Nekoma had a population of 23.

== History ==
The town of Nekoma was laid out in July 1869.

== Geography ==
The town is located in the far south of the county, at the intersections of Illinois Routes 17 and 82.

According to the 2021 census gazetteer files, Nekoma has a total area of 0.13 square miles (0.34 km^{2}), all land.

== Demographics ==
Historical population
| Census | Pop. | Note | %± |
|---|---|---|---|
| 2020 | 23 | | — |
U.S. Decennial Census

Nekoma first appeared as a census designated place in the 2020 U.S. Census.

As of the 2020 census there were 23 people, 48 households, and 0 families residing in the CDP. The population density was 175.57 inhabitants per square mile (67.79/km^{2}). There were 11 housing units at an average density of 83.97 per square mile (32.42/km^{2}). The racial makeup of the CDP was 73.91% White, 8.70% African American, 0.00% Native American, 4.35% Asian, 0.00% Pacific Islander, 0.00% from other races, and 13.04% from two or more races. Hispanic or Latino of any race were 0.00% of the population.

There were 48 households, out of which all were non-families.

== Education ==
It is in the Galva Community Unit School District 224.
