= Goshen Township, Stark County, Illinois =

Coordinates: 41°06′10″N 89°55′55″W

Goshen Township
- Township
- Location in Stark County

- Stark County's location in Illinois
- Country: United States
- State: Illinois
- County: Stark
- Established: November 2, 1852

Area
  - Total: 36.49 sq mi (94.5 km^{2})
  - Land: 36.49 sq mi (94.5 km^{2})
  - Water: 0 sq mi (0 km^{2}) 0%

Population (2010)
  - Estimate (2016): 665
  - Density: 18.8/sq mi (7.3/km^{2})
- Time zone: UTC-6 (CST)
  - Summer (DST): UTC-5 (CDT)
- FIPS code: 17-175-30627

Goshen Township is located in Stark County, Illinois. As of the 2010 census, its population was 686 and it contained 318 housing units.

== History ==
Goshen Township is named after Goshen, Tuscarawas County, Ohio.

== Geography ==
According to the 2010 census, the township has a total area of 36.49 square miles (94.5 km^{2}), all land.

== Demographics ==
Historical population
Census	Pop.	Note	%±
2016 (est.)	665
U.S. Decennial Census
