= Walnut Grove Township, Knox County, Illinois =

Walnut Grove Township
- Township
- Location in Knox County

- Knox County's location in Illinois
- Coordinates: 41°06′31″N 90°09′15″W
- Country: United States
- State: Illinois
- County: Knox
- Established: November 2, 1852

Area
  - Total: 35.68 sq mi (92.4 km^{2})
  - Land: 35.56 sq mi (92.1 km^{2})
  - Water: 0.12 sq mi (0.31 km^{2}) 0.33%
- Elevation: 735 ft (224 m)

Population (2020)
  - Total: 685
  - Density: 19.3/sq mi (7.44/km^{2})
- Time zone: UTC-6 (CST)
  - Summer (DST): UTC-5 (CDT)
- ZIP codes: 61414, 61467, 61485
- FIPS code: 17-095-78565

Walnut Grove Township is one of twenty-one townships in Knox County, Illinois, USA. As of the 2020 census, its population was 685 and it contained 317 housing units.

== Geography ==
According to the 2021 census gazetteer files, Walnut Grove Township has a total area of 35.68 square miles (92.41 km^{2}), of which 35.56 square miles (92.10 km^{2}) (or 99.67%) is land and 0.12 square miles (0.31 km^{2}) (or 0.33%) is water.

=== Cities, towns, villages ===
- Altona

=== Cemeteries ===
The township contains these three cemeteries: Altona, Larson and Walnut Grove.

== Demographics ==
As of the 2020 census there were 685 people, 284 households, and 218 families residing in the township. The population density was 19.20 inhabitants per square mile (7.41/km^{2}). There were 317 housing units at an average density of 8.88 per square mile (3.43/km^{2}). The racial makeup of the township was 94.89% White, 0.00% African American, 0.15% Native American, 0.44% Asian, 0.15% Pacific Islander, 0.88% from other races, and 3.50% from two or more races. Hispanic or Latino of any race were 2.77% of the population.

There were 284 households, out of which 37.30% had children under the age of 18 living with them, 51.76% were married couples living together, 15.14% had a female householder with no spouse present, and 23.24% were non-families. 14.40% of all households were made up of individuals, and 6.30% had someone living alone who was 65 years of age or older. The average household size was 2.72 and the average family size was 2.95.

The township's age distribution consisted of 26.4% under the age of 18, 10.1% from 18 to 24, 22.7% from 25 to 44, 26% from 45 to 64, and 14.8% who were 65 years of age or older. The median age was 34.2 years. For every 100 females, there were 113.9 males. For every 100 females age 18 and over, there were 90.0 males.

The median income for a household in the township was $64,375, and the median income for a family was $66,389. Males had a median income of $41,083 versus $26,875 for females. The per capita income for the township was $27,539. About 11.9% of families and 13.5% of the population were below the poverty line, including 22.1% of those under age 18 and 9.6% of those age 65 or over.

Historical population
Census	Pop.	Note	%±
2010	770		—
2020	685		−11.0%
U.S. Decennial Census

== School districts ==
- R.O.W.V.A. Community Unit School District 208

== Political districts ==
- Illinois's 18th congressional district
- State House District 74
- State Senate District 37
