= Neponset Township, Bureau County, Illinois =

Neponset Township
- Township
- Location in Bureau County

- Bureau County's location in Illinois
- Coordinates: 41°16′49″N 89°47′40″W
- Country: United States
- State: Illinois
- County: Bureau
- Established: November 6, 1849

Area
  - Total: 36.15 sq mi (93.6 km^{2})
  - Land: 36.14 sq mi (93.6 km^{2})
  - Water: 0.01 sq mi (0.026 km^{2}) 0.03%
- Elevation: 784 ft (239 m)

Population (2020)
  - Total: 658
  - Density: 18.2/sq mi (7.03/km^{2})
- Time zone: UTC-6 (CST)
  - Summer (DST): UTC-5 (CDT)
- ZIP codes: 61314, 61345
- FIPS code: 17-011-52012

Neponset Township is one of twenty-five townships in Bureau County, Illinois, USA. As of the 2020 census, its population was 658 and it contained 313 housing units. Neponset Township changed its name from Brawby Township on 5 March 1866.

== Geography ==
According to the 2010 census, the township has a total area of 36.15 square miles (93.6 km^{2}), of which 36.14 square miles (93.6 km^{2}) (or 99.97%) is land and 0.01 square miles (0.026 km^{2}) (or 0.03%) is water.

The southern and eastern parts of the township form part of the Illinois River watershed, the headwaters of Spoon River arising in the northeast portion of the township. The northwest portion of Neponset township is drained by Mud Creek, which flows into Green River, thence into Rock River.

=== Villages ===
- Neponset

=== Cemeteries ===
- Floral Hill
- Neponset

=== Major highways ===
- US Route 34

== Demographics ==
As of the 2020 census there were 658 people, 277 households, and 220 families residing in the township. The population density was 18.18 inhabitants per square mile (7.02/km^{2}). There were 313 housing units at an average density of 8.65 per square mile (3.34/km^{2}). The racial makeup of the township was 90.58% White, 1.06% African American, 0.15% Native American, 0.76% Asian, 0.00% Pacific Islander, 2.74% from other races, and 4.71% from two or more races. Hispanic or Latino of any race were 4.71% of the population.

There were 277 households, out of which 18.80% had children under the age of 18 living with them, 70.76% were married couples living together, 2.53% had a female householder with no spouse present, and 20.58% were non-families. 16.20% of all households were made up of individuals, and 8.30% had someone living alone who was 65 years of age or older. The average household size was 2.35 and the average family size was 2.57.

The township's age distribution consisted of 15.8% under the age of 18, 4.9% from 18 to 24, 21.7% from 25 to 44, 35.2% from 45 to 64, and 22.4% who were 65 years of age or older. The median age was 54.1 years. For every 100 females, there were 109.3 males. For every 100 females age 18 and over, there were 100.7 males.

The median income for a household in the township was $93,281, and the median income for a family was $98,958. Males had a median income of $55,333 versus $33,125 for females. The per capita income for the township was $42,778. About 4.1% of families and 13.1% of the population were below the poverty line, including 26.2% of those under age 18 and 5.5% of those age 65 or over.

Historical population
Census	Pop.	Note	%±
2010	742		—
2020	658		−11.3%
US Decennial Census

== School districts ==
- Bureau Valley Community Unit School District 340
- Neponset Community Consolidated District 307
- Wethersfield Community Unit School District 230

== Political districts ==
- Illinois's 17th congressional district
- State House District 74
- State Senate District 37
