= Elmira Township, Stark County, Illinois =

Coordinates: 41°11′35″N 89°48′27″W

Elmira Township
- Township
- Location in Stark County

- Stark County's location in Illinois
- Country: United States
- State: Illinois
- County: Stark
- Established: November 2, 1852

Area
  - Total: 35.31 sq mi (91.5 km^{2})
  - Land: 35.31 sq mi (91.5 km^{2})
  - Water: 0 sq mi (0 km^{2}) 0%

Population (2010)
  - Estimate (2016): 307
  - Density: 9/sq mi (3.5/km^{2})
- Time zone: UTC-6 (CST)
  - Summer (DST): UTC-5 (CDT)
- FIPS code: 17-175-23646

Elmira Township is located in Stark County, Illinois. As of the 2010 census, its population was 319 and it contained 158 housing units. As at 2020, the population census was 311, and its housing units are 144. Employment rate according to the American Community Survey is 61.8%.

== History ==
Elmira Township is named after Elmira, New York. Elmira stands out for its natural beauty. Before 1834, it was primarily used by Native Americans for hunting, and only two families lived there. By 1835, settlers from the Peoria colony arrived, and within 45 years, the population reached 978, including those in Osceola and Elmira. The land is largely scenic, featuring spacious homes with manicured gardens. Fields are neatly bordered by hedges, and willow trees grow for shade. The township is bordered by Henry and Bureau counties to the west and north, with Osceola and Toulon to the east and south.

== Geography ==
According to the 2010 census, the township has a total area of 35.31 square miles (91.5 km^{2}), all land.

== Demographics ==
Historical population
| Census | Pop. | Note | %± |
|---|---|---|---|
| 2016 (est.) | 307 |
U.S. Decennial Census
