= Illinois Route 82 =

State highway in Henry County, Illinois, US

Illinois Route 82

Route information
- Maintained by IDOT
- Length: 28.84 mi (46.41 km)
- Existed: 1924–present

Major junctions
- South end: IL 17 in Bishop Hill
- IL 81 in Cambridge; I-80 / US 6 in Geneseo
- North end: IL 92 near Geneseo

Location
- Country: United States
- State: Illinois
- Counties: Henry

Highway system
- Illinois State Highway System; Interstate; US; State; Tollways; Scenic
← IL 81	→ IL 83

Illinois Route 82 (IL 82) is a rural north–south state highway in west central Illinois, United States. It currently runs from Illinois Route 17 in Nekoma north to Illinois Route 92 near Joslin. This is a distance of 28.84 miles (46.41 km).

== Route description ==
Illinois 82 is an undivided, two-lane surface street for its entire length. It crosses the Edwards River, Interstate 80 (I-80), U.S. Route 6 (US 6), the Hennepin Canal and the Green River along its route. It also overlaps Illinois Route 81 in Cambridge.

== History ==
SBI Route 82 was existing Illinois 82, extended to Illinois Route 40 via Illinois 92 and Illinois Route 172. This ended in the 1930s.

== Major intersections ==
The entire route is in Henry County.

Location	mi	km	Destinations	Notes
	0.0	0.0	IL 17 – Galva, Alpha	
Cambridge	9.3	15.0	IL 81 west – Andover	Begin/end concurrency with IL 81
	10.3	16.6	IL 81 east – Kewanee	Begin/end concurrency with IL 81
Geneseo	19.5	31.4	I-80 – Moline, Rock Island, Joliet	Exit 19 (I-80)
Geneseo	20.2	32.5	US 6 east – Princeton	Begin/end concurrency with US 6
Geneseo	21.1	34.0	US 6 west – Moline	Begin/end concurrency with US 6
	28.84	46.41	IL 92 – Moline, Mendota	
1.000 mi = 1.609 km; 1.000 km = 0.621 mi: Concurrency terminus
