= Henry County, Illinois =

County in Illinois, United States

- County
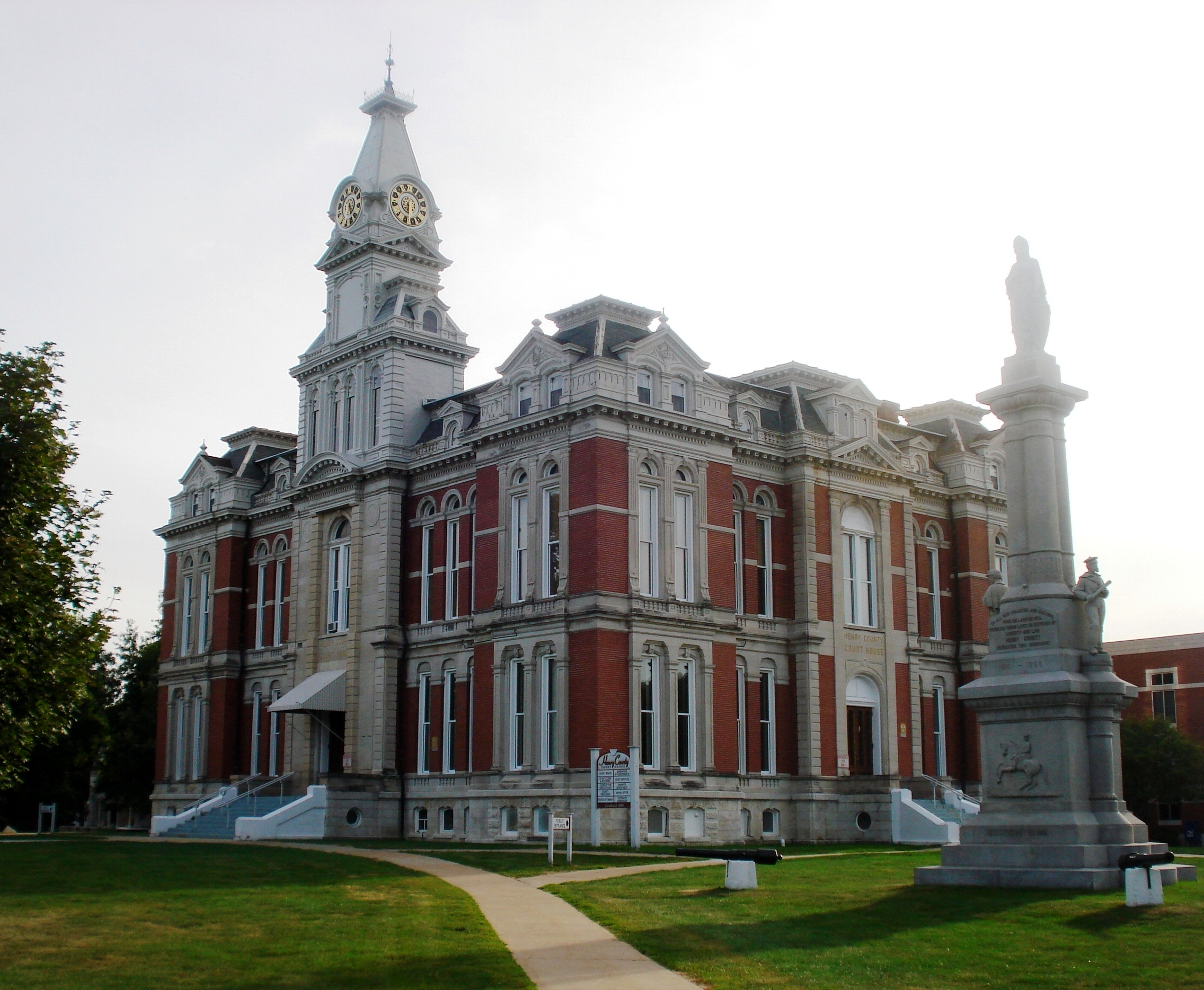
- Henry County Courthouse

- Location within the U.S. state of Illinois
- Coordinates: 41°21′N 90°08′W
- Country: United States
- State: Illinois
- Founded: January 13, 1825
- Named for: Patrick Henry
- Seat: Cambridge
- Largest city: Kewanee

Area
  - Total: 826 sq mi (2,140 km^{2})
  - Land: 823 sq mi (2,130 km^{2})
  - Water: 2.7 sq mi (7.0 km^{2}) 0.3%

Population (2020)
  - Total: 49,284
  - Estimate (2025): 48,095 ▼
  - Density: 59.9/sq mi (23.1/km^{2})
- Time zone: UTC−6 (Central)
  - Summer (DST): UTC−5 (CDT)
- Congressional districts: 16th, 17th
- Website: www.henrycty.com

Henry County is a county located in the U.S. state of Illinois. The 2020 United States census listed its population at 49,284. Its county seat is Cambridge. Henry County is included in the Davenport-Moline-Rock Island, IA-IL Metropolitan Statistical Area.

== History ==
Henry County was formed on January 13, 1825, out of Fulton County, Illinois. It is named for Revolutionary War figure Patrick Henry. The county was settled by people from New England and western New York, descendants of English Puritans who settled New England in the colonial era. The New England settlers founded the five towns of Andover, Wethersfield, Geneseo, Morristown and La Grange.

The settlement of Cambridge came about in 1843, when the owner of the land in that area (Rev. Ithamar Pillsbury) dedicated a section of his properties to a town council; lots were sold to incoming settlers, and construction of the town proper began on June 9, 1843. The incoming "Yankee" settlers made Henry County culturally similar to early New England culture.

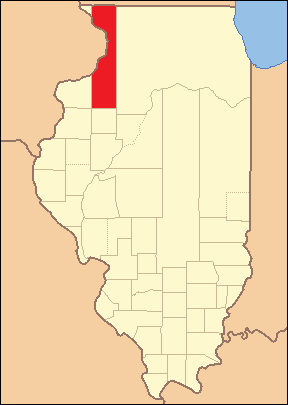
Henry County from the time of its creation to 1827

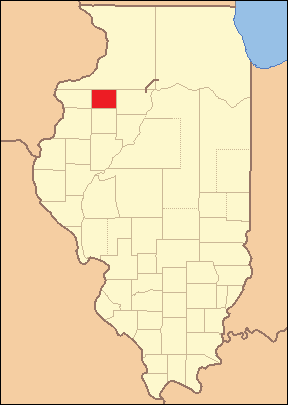
The county between 1827 and 1831

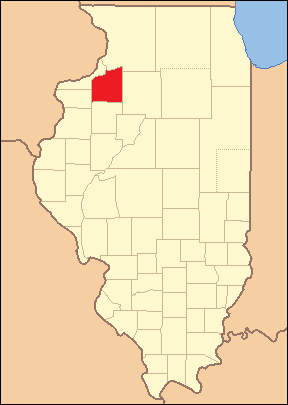
Henry between 1831 and 1836

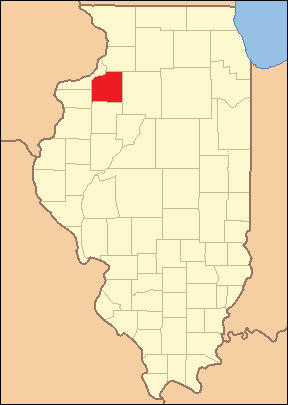
Henry in 1836, after Whiteside County was created

== Geography ==
According to the US Census Bureau, the county has a total area of 826 square miles (2,140 km^{2}), of which 823 square miles (2,130 km^{2}) is land and 2.7 square miles (7.0 km^{2}) (0.3%) is water. It is the 29th largest of Illinois' 102 counties. The area is fairly flat, with elevations ranging from 650 feet above sea level in the northwest to 850 in the southeast. About 456,596 acres (1,847.78 km^{2}) or 86.7% of the county's land area, is used for agriculture.

=== Climate and weather ===
Cambridge, Illinois

Climate chart (precipitation, max. and min. temperature)
J	F	M	A	M	J	J	A	S	O	N	D
1.5 29 13	1.6 35 19	2.7 47 30	3.7 61 40	4.2 73 52	4.2 82 61	3.9 86 66	4.3 83 63	3.3 76 55	3 63 43	2.8 47 31	2.2 33 19
- █ Average max. and min. temperatures in °F
- █ Precipitation totals in inches
- Source: The Weather Channel
Metric conversion
J	F	M	A	M	J	J	A	S	O	N	D
39 −2 −11	40 2 −7	68 8 −1	95 16 4	107 23 11	107 28 16	99 30 19	110 28 17	84 24 13	76 17 6	72 8 −1	55 1 −7
- █ Average max. and min. temperatures in °C
- █ Precipitation totals in mm

In recent years, average temperatures in the county seat of Cambridge have ranged from a low of 13 °F (−11 °C) in January to a high of 86 °F (30 °C) in July, although a record low of −24 °F (−31 °C) was recorded in February 1996 and a record high of 103 °F (39 °C) was recorded in July 1983. Average monthly precipitation ranged from 1.52 inches (39 mm) in January to 4.32 inches (110 mm) in August.

=== Major highways ===
- I-74
- I-80
- I-280
- US 6
- US 34
- US 150
- IL 17
- IL 78
- IL 81
- IL 82
- IL 84
- IL 91
- IL 92
- IL 110 (CKC)

=== Adjacent counties ===
- Rock Island County - northwest
- Whiteside County - northeast
- Bureau County - east
- Stark County - southeast
- Knox County - south
- Mercer County - west

== Demographics ==
Historical population
Census	Pop.	Note	%±
1830	41		—
1840	1,260		2,973.2%
1850	3,807		202.1%
1860	20,660		442.7%
1870	35,506		71.9%
1880	36,597		3.1%
1890	33,338		−8.9%
1900	40,049		20.1%
1910	41,736		4.2%
1920	45,162		8.2%
1930	43,851		−2.9%
1940	43,798		−0.1%
1950	46,492		6.2%
1960	49,317		6.1%
1970	53,217		7.9%
1980	57,968		8.9%
1990	51,159		−11.7%
2000	51,020		−0.3%
2010	50,486		−1.0%
2020	49,284		−2.4%
2025 (est.)	48,095	▼	−2.4%
US Decennial Census; 1790-1960 1900-1990; 1990-2000 2010

2000 census age pyramid for Henry County

=== 2020 census ===
As of the 2020 census, the county had a population of 49,284. The median age was 43.2 years. 22.8% of residents were under the age of 18 and 21.4% of residents were 65 years of age or older. For every 100 females there were 99.1 males, and for every 100 females age 18 and over there were 98.1 males age 18 and over.

The racial makeup of the county was 89.1% White, 2.2% Black or African American, 0.2% American Indian and Alaska Native, 0.4% Asian, <0.1% Native Hawaiian and Pacific Islander, 2.6% from some other race, and 5.4% from two or more races. Hispanic or Latino residents of any race comprised 6.4% of the population.

50.2% of residents lived in urban areas, while 49.8% lived in rural areas.

There were 20,320 households in the county, of which 28.5% had children under the age of 18 living in them. Of all households, 51.9% were married-couple households, 17.7% were households with a male householder and no spouse or partner present, and 23.6% were households with a female householder and no spouse or partner present. About 28.6% of all households were made up of individuals and 14.3% had someone living alone who was 65 years of age or older.

There were 22,211 housing units, of which 8.5% were vacant. Among occupied housing units, 78.5% were owner-occupied and 21.5% were renter-occupied. The homeowner vacancy rate was 2.0% and the rental vacancy rate was 9.0%.

=== Racial and ethnic composition ===
Henry County, Illinois – Racial and ethnic composition Note: the US Census treats Hispanic/Latino as an ethnic category. This table excludes Latinos from the racial categories and assigns them to a separate category. Hispanics/Latinos may be of any race.
Race / Ethnicity (NH = Non-Hispanic)	Pop 1980	Pop 1990	Pop 2000	Pop 2010	Pop 2020	% 1980	% 1990	% 2000	% 2010	% 2020
White alone (NH)	56,352	49,527	48,425	46,493	43,094	97.21%	96.81%	94.91%	92.09%	87.44%
Black or African American alone (NH)	647	645	569	762	1,029	1.12%	1.26%	1.12%	1.51%	2.09%
Native American or Alaska Native alone (NH)	59	54	42	60	63	0.10%	0.11%	0.08%	0.12%	0.13%
Asian alone (NH)	88	116	127	183	192	0.15%	0.23%	0.25%	0.36%	0.39%
Native Hawaiian or Pacific Islander alone (NH)	x	x	4	13	12	x	x	0.01%	0.03%	0.02%
Other race alone (NH)	30	20	21	12	94	0.05%	0.04%	0.04%	0.02%	0.19%
Mixed race or Multiracial (NH)	x	x	365	561	1,630	x	x	0.72%	1.11%	3.31%
Hispanic or Latino (any race)	792	797	1,467	2,402	3,170	1.37%	1.56%	2.88%	4.76%	6.43%
Total	57,968	51,159	51,020	50,486	49,284	100.00%	100.00%	100.00%	100.00%	100.00%

=== 2010 census ===
As of the 2010 United States census, there were 50,486 people, 20,373 households, and 14,149 families residing in the county. The population density was 61.3 inhabitants per square mile (23.7/km^{2}). There were 22,161 housing units at an average density of 26.9 per square mile (10.4/km^{2}). The racial makeup of the county was 94.8% white, 1.6% black or African American, 0.4% Asian, 0.2% American Indian, 1.6% from other races, and 1.4% from two or more races. Those of Hispanic or Latino origin made up 4.8% of the population. In terms of ancestry, 30.0% were German, 14.6% were Irish, 12.3% were Swedish, 11.5% were English, and 7.2% were American.

Of the 20,373 households, 31.1% had children under the age of 18 living with them, 55.9% were married couples living together, 9.5% had a female householder with no husband present, 30.6% were non-families, and 26.1% of all households were made up of individuals. The average household size was 2.44 and the average family size was 2.92. The median age was 41.8 years.

The median income for a household in the county was $49,164 and the median income for a family was $61,467. Males had a median income of $44,589 versus $30,992 for females. The per capita income for the county was $24,915. About 6.8% of families and 10.4% of the population were below the poverty line, including 16.9% of those under age 18 and 8.7% of those age 65 or over.

== Communities ==
=== Cities ===
- Colona
- Galva
- Geneseo
- Kewanee

=== Towns ===
- Annawan
- Atkinson

=== Villages ===
- Alpha
- Andover
- Bishop Hill
- Cambridge
- Cleveland
- Coal Valley (partial)
- Hooppole
- Orion
- Woodhull

=== Census-designated places ===
- Lynn Center
- Nekoma
- Ophiem
- Osco

=== Unincorporated communities ===
- Aliceville
- Briar Bluff
- Brook Lawn
- Dayton
- German Corner
- Green River
- Green Rock
- Hickory Hills
- Level Acres
- Morristown
- Shady Beach
- Sunny Hill
- Sunny Hill Estates
- Timber Ridge
- Ulah
- Warner
- Woodcrest

=== Former communities ===
- Kedron
- Oxford
- Saxon

=== Townships ===
- Alba
- Andover
- Annawan
- Atkinson
- Burns
- Cambridge
- Clover
- Colona
- Cornwall
- Edford
- Galva
- Geneseo
- Hanna
- Kewanee
- Loraine
- Lynn
- Munson
- Osco
- Oxford
- Phenix
- Weller
- Western
- Wethersfield
- Yorktown

== Politics ==
Henry County's political history is fairly typical of many Yankee-settled rural counties in Illinois. After being largely Democratic in its first few elections, the county turned powerfully Republican for the 110 years following the formation of that party.

United States presidential election results for Henry County, Illinois
Year	Republican		Democratic		Third party(ies)	
Year	No.	%	No.	%	No.	%
1892	4,265	55.82%	2,670	34.95%	705	9.23%
1896	6,177	66.03%	2,971	31.76%	207	2.21%
1900	6,892	68.54%	2,809	27.94%	354	3.52%
1904	7,331	74.52%	1,390	14.13%	1,117	11.35%
1908	6,387	64.53%	2,499	25.25%	1,011	10.22%
1912	1,859	20.29%	2,219	24.22%	5,085	55.49%
1916	11,406	65.42%	5,220	29.94%	808	4.63%
1920	12,379	78.96%	2,530	16.14%	768	4.90%
1924	13,159	72.39%	1,944	10.69%	3,076	16.92%
1928	14,666	70.83%	5,858	28.29%	183	0.88%
1932	11,376	51.25%	10,122	45.60%	701	3.16%
1936	11,953	49.61%	11,490	47.69%	651	2.70%
1940	14,971	58.37%	10,481	40.86%	196	0.76%
1944	13,539	59.48%	9,130	40.11%	92	0.40%
1948	12,363	58.84%	8,489	40.40%	159	0.76%
1952	16,301	65.49%	8,558	34.38%	33	0.13%
1956	15,896	65.46%	8,349	34.38%	39	0.16%
1960	14,297	57.91%	10,372	42.01%	21	0.09%
1964	10,644	46.83%	12,085	53.17%	0	0.00%
1968	12,524	55.10%	8,455	37.20%	1,752	7.71%
1972	14,796	63.82%	8,368	36.09%	21	0.09%
1976	12,849	56.03%	9,822	42.83%	263	1.15%
1980	14,506	59.93%	7,977	32.95%	1,723	7.12%
1984	14,504	57.41%	10,679	42.27%	79	0.31%
1988	11,358	49.28%	11,594	50.30%	96	0.42%
1992	8,989	36.88%	11,077	45.45%	4,305	17.66%
1996	8,393	38.33%	11,201	51.15%	2,303	10.52%
2000	10,896	46.43%	11,921	50.79%	653	2.78%
2004	13,212	52.34%	11,877	47.05%	152	0.60%
2008	11,263	45.33%	13,181	53.04%	405	1.63%
2012	11,583	47.46%	12,332	50.53%	490	2.01%
2016	13,985	56.75%	8,871	36.00%	1,787	7.25%
2020	15,300	59.53%	9,797	38.12%	604	2.35%
2024	15,359	60.99%	9,226	36.64%	596	2.37%

== Education ==
K-12 school districts include:

- Alwood Community Unit School District 225
- Annawan Community Unit School District 226
- Cambridge Community Unit School District 227
- Erie Community Unit School District 1
- Galva Community Unit School District 224
- Geneseo Community Unit School District 228
- Kewanee Community Unit School District 229
- ROWVA Community Unit School District 208
- Orion Community Unit School District 223
- Prophetstown-Lyndon-Tampico Community Unit School District 3
- Stark County Community Unit School District 100
- Wethersfield Community Unit School District 230

There is also an elementary school district, Colona School District 190, and a secondary school district, United Township High School District 30, that have portions of the county.

== See also ==
- National Register of Historic Places listings in Henry County, Illinois
