= Lynn Township, Knox County, Illinois =

Lynn Township
- Township
- Location in Knox County

- Knox County's location in Illinois
- Coordinates: 41°06′21″N 90°02′29″W
- Country: United States
- State: Illinois
- County: Knox
- Established: November 2, 1852

Area
  - Total: 35.37 sq mi (91.6 km^{2})
  - Land: 35.32 sq mi (91.5 km^{2})
  - Water: 0.05 sq mi (0.13 km^{2}) 0.13%
- Elevation: 774 ft (236 m)

Population (2020)
  - Total: 282
  - Density: 7.98/sq mi (3.08/km^{2})
- Time zone: UTC-6 (CST)
  - Summer (DST): UTC-5 (CDT)
- ZIP codes: 61414, 61434, 61449, 61485
- FIPS code: 17-095-45330

Lynn Township is one of twenty-one townships in Knox County, Illinois, USA. As of the 2020 census, its population was 282 and it contained 159 housing units.

== Geography ==
According to the 2021 census gazetteer files, Lynn Township has a total area of 35.37 square miles (91.61 km^{2}), of which 35.32 square miles (91.48 km^{2}) (or 99.87%) is land and 0.05 square miles (0.13 km^{2}) (or 0.13%) is water.

=== Unincorporated towns ===
- Centerville at 41.0644816°N 90.0542816°W

=== Cemeteries ===
The township contains these two cemeteries: Fraker and Galva.

== Demographics ==
As of the 2020 census there were 282 people, 56 households, and 17 families residing in the township. The population density was 7.97 inhabitants per square mile (3.08/km^{2}). There were 159 housing units at an average density of 4.50 per square mile (1.74/km^{2}). The racial makeup of the township was 93.62% White, 0.00% African American, 0.35% Native American, 0.35% Asian, 0.00% Pacific Islander, 2.13% from other races, and 3.55% from two or more races. Hispanic or Latino of any race were 2.84% of the population.

There were 56 households, out of which 16.10% had children under the age of 18 living with them, 14.29% were married couples living together, 16.07% had a female householder with no spouse present, and 69.64% were non-families. 69.60% of all households were made up of individuals, and 55.40% had someone living alone who was 65 years of age or older. The average household size was 1.29 and the average family size was 1.94.

The township's age distribution consisted of 11.1% under the age of 18, 0.0% from 18 to 24, 11.1% from 25 to 44, 12.5% from 45 to 64, and 65.3% who were 65 years of age or older. The median age was 67.5 years. For every 100 females, there were 188.0 males. For every 100 females age 18 and over, there were 276.5 males.

The per capita income for the township was $50,042. About 52.9% of families and 23.6% of the population were below the poverty line.

Historical population
Census	Pop.	Note	%±
2010	309		—
2020	282		−8.7%
U.S. Decennial Census

== School districts ==
- Galva Community Unit School District 224
- R.O.W.V.A. Community Unit School District 208
- Stark County Community Unit School District 100

== Political districts ==
- Illinois's 18th congressional district
- State House District 74
- State Senate District 37
