= Hennepin Canal Parkway State Park =

Canal in Illinois, United States of America

Hennepin Canal State Trail
- IUCN category III (natural monument or feature)
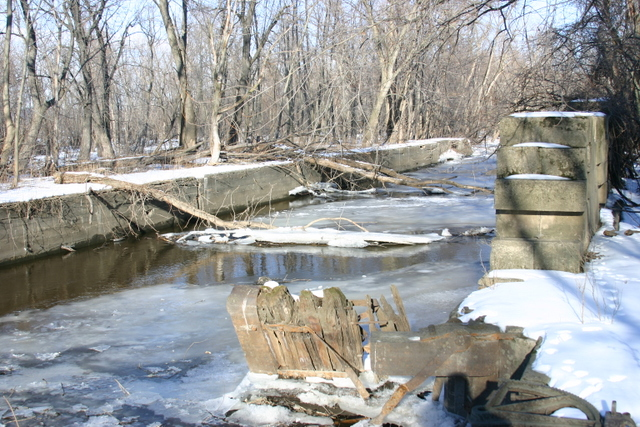
- Hennepin Canal Lock #1 on February 13, 2004. The Illinois Department of Natural Resources claims that this lock has been under water since the 1930s.

- Location within Illinois Location within the United States
- Location: Rock Island, Bureau, Henry, Lee, and Whiteside Counties, Illinois, USA
- Nearest city: Sheffield, Illinois
- Coordinates: 41°22′44″N 89°41′29″W
- Length: Main canal length: 75.2 miles (121.0 km); feeder canal length: 29.3 miles (47.2 km)
- Established: August 1, 1970
- Governing body: Illinois Department of Natural Resources
- Hennepin Canal Historic District
- U.S. National Register of Historic Places
- Built: 1890 – 1907
- Architect: U.S. Corps of Engineers
- NRHP reference No.: 78003433
- Added to NRHP: May 22, 1978

The Hennepin Canal State Trail, also just called the Hennepin Canal, is an abandoned waterway in northwest Illinois, between the Mississippi River at Rock Island and the Illinois River near Hennepin. The entire canal is listed on the National Register of Historic Places.

Opened in 1907, the canal was soon abandoned because of railroad competition. It was resurrected in the late 20th century as a recreational waterway. Its former name was the Illinois and Mississippi Canal. The main canal length is 75.2 miles (121.0 km), and its feeder canal is 29.3 miles (47.2 km) long. The state park spans five counties (Rock Island, Bureau, Henry, Lee and Whiteside) and is 104.5 miles (168.2 km) long.

The Hennepin Canal follows a natural low area between Hennepin and Rock Island. This is actually the ancient channel of the Mississippi River, which at one time flowed from Rock Island to Hennepin, and then south through what is now the Illinois River channel. The Illinoian Stage, about 300,000 to 132,000 years before present day, blocked the Mississippi River near Rock Island, diverting the Mississippi into its modern channel.

== History ==
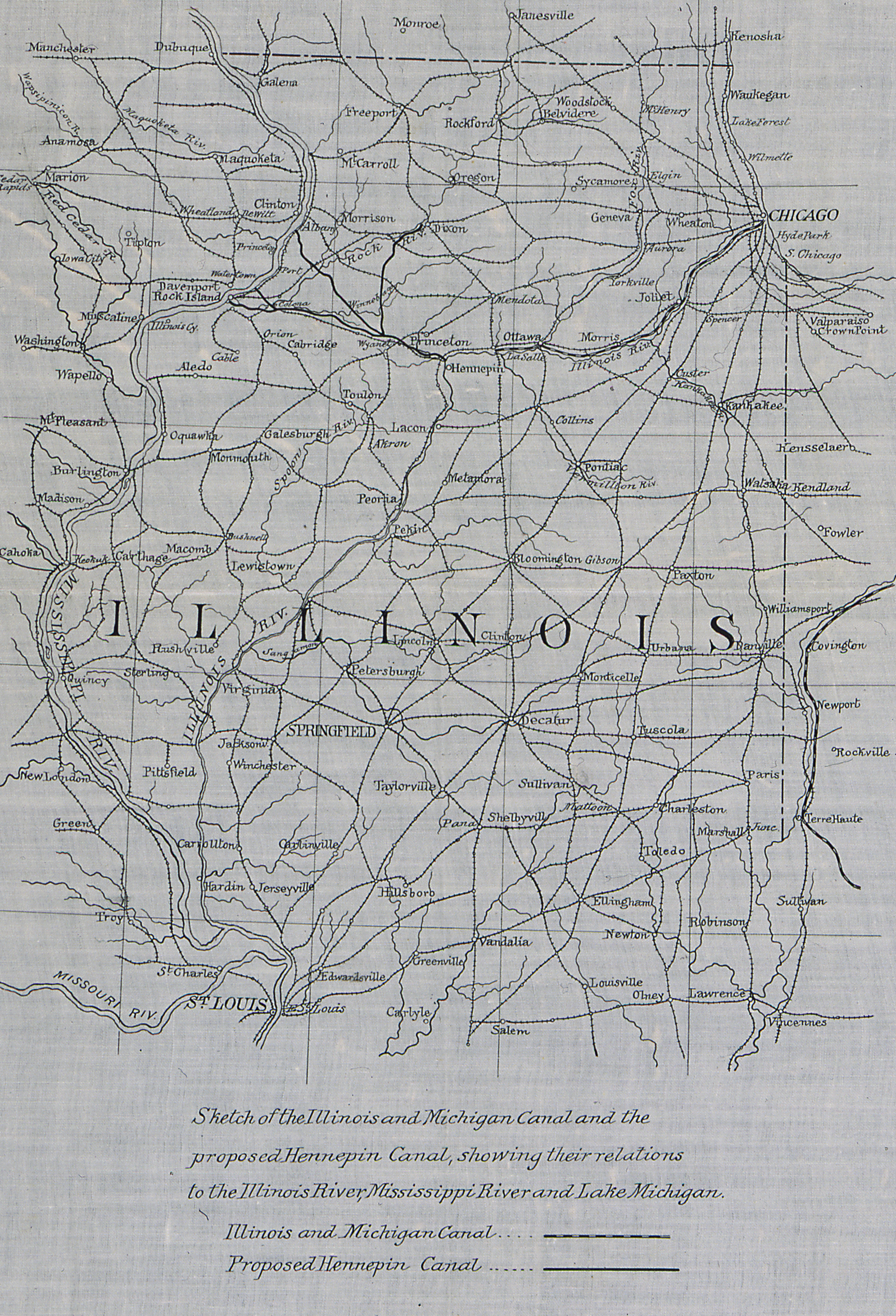
Sketch of the Illinois and Michigan Canal and the proposed Hennepin Canal, showing their relations to the Illinois River, Mississippi River, and Lake Michigan, 1883, in the collection of the National Archives and Records Administration

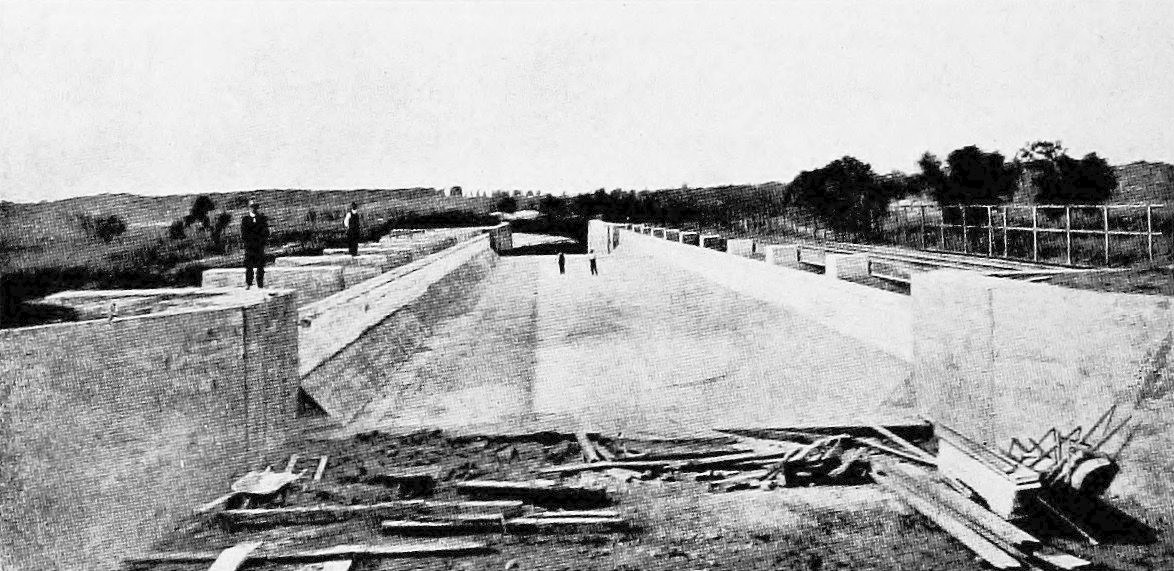
Hennepin Canal after construction

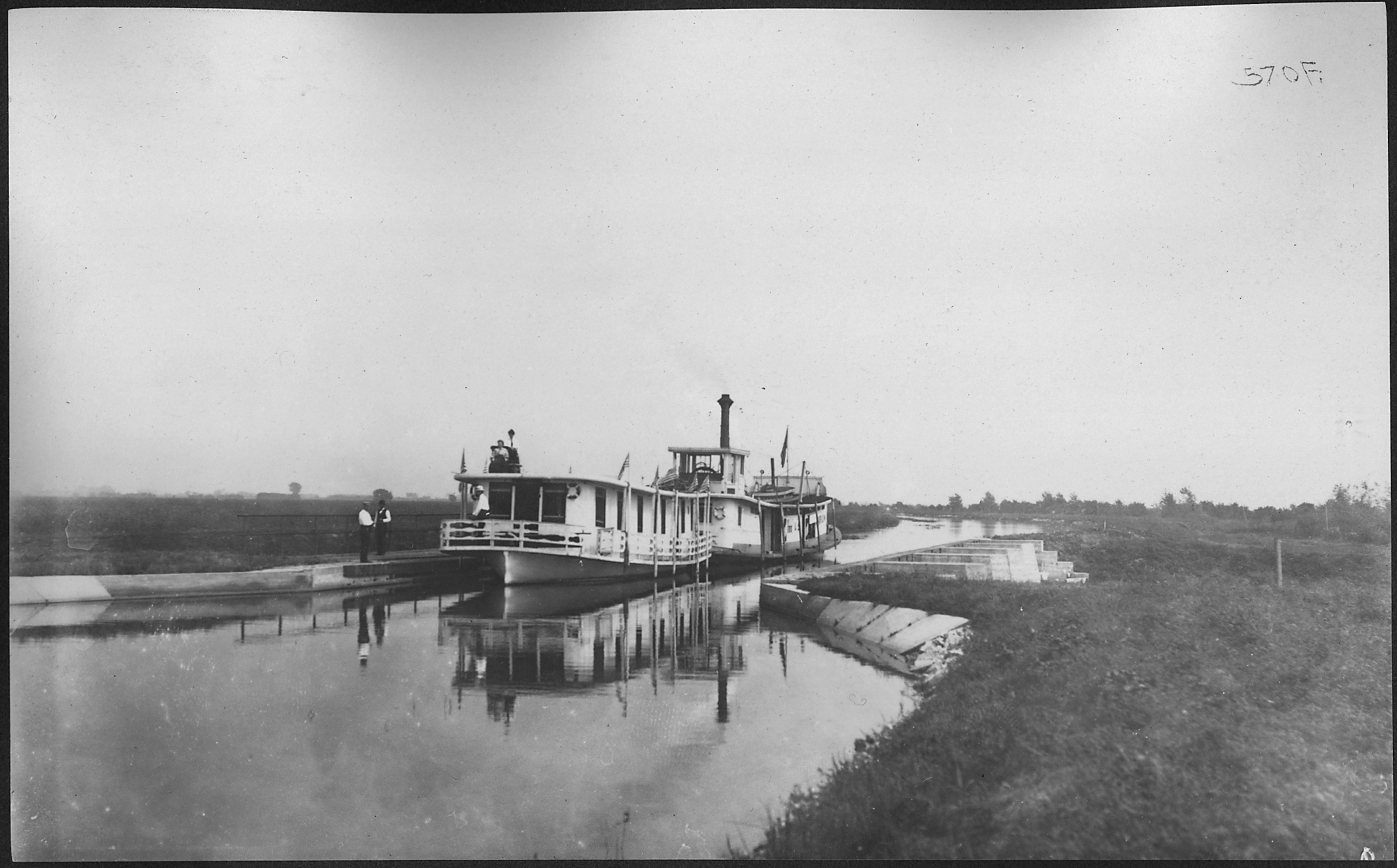
The steamer Marion with Rambler in tow at Aqueduct number 4, 1908

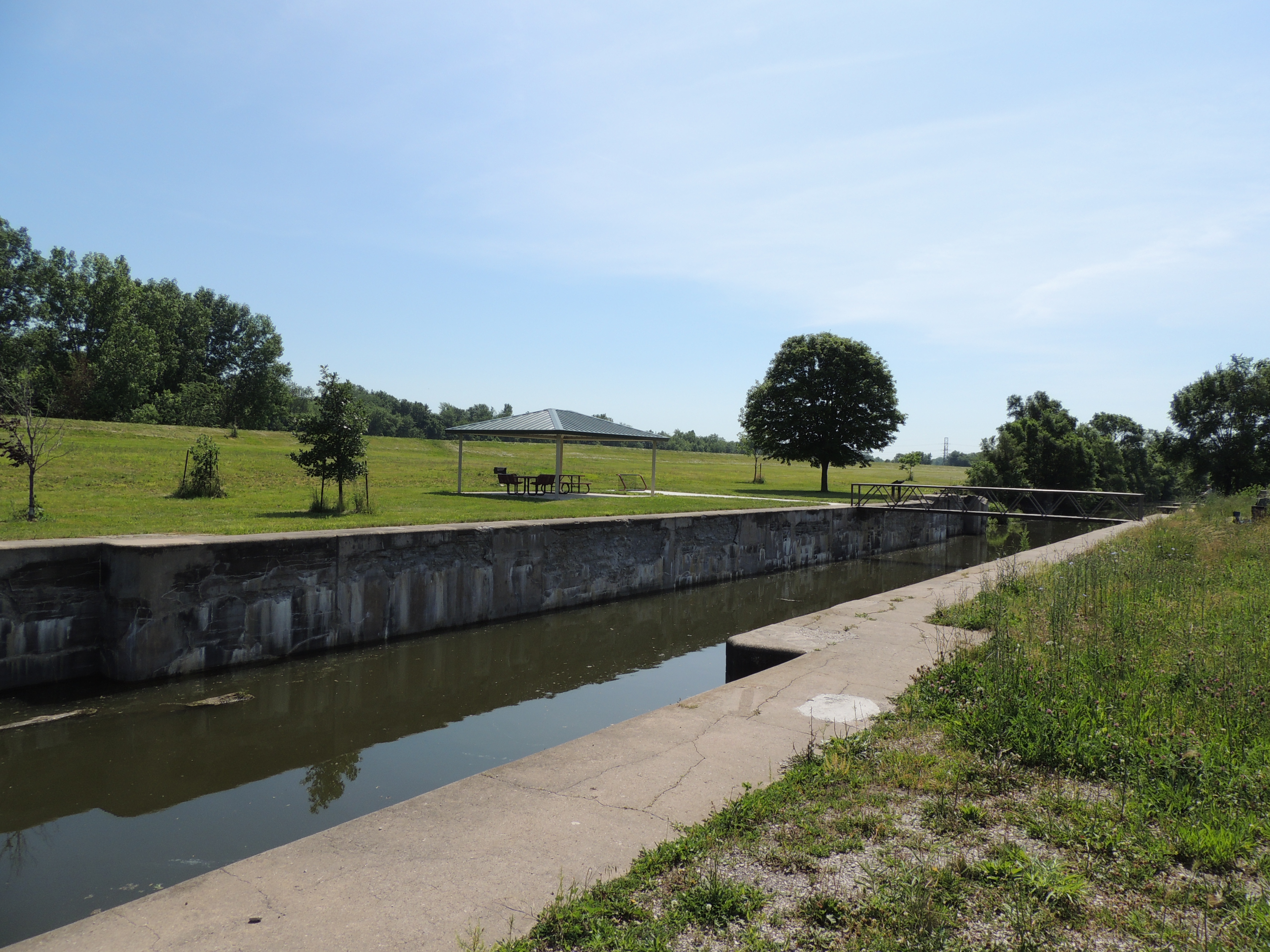
Lock 31

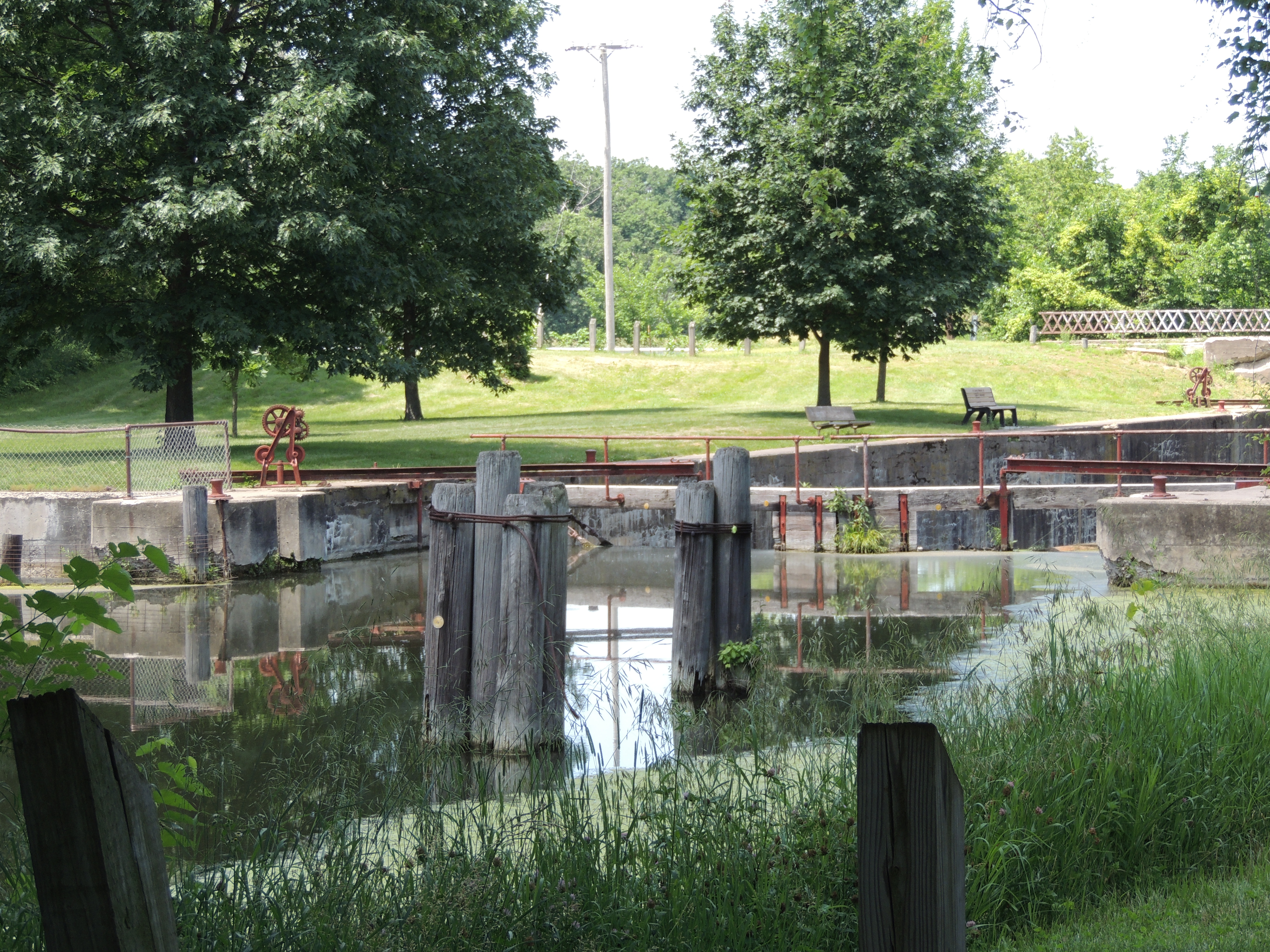
Lock 24

=== Planning of the canal ===
The idea to build the canal arose in 1834 (Sage 1). It would allow the shipping of heavy and bulky freight where the railroad could not. The proposed canal would join the Illinois and Mississippi Rivers creating a quick route from Chicago to the Mississippi River. To build the canal would mean that local citizens would have to gain the support of their state and other beneficial government officials (Yeater 2).

The canal reduced the distance from the Illinois River to the Mississippi by 419 miles (674 km). Interest in the canal increased during the Civil War, when relations between the North and the South were deteriorating to the point where war was possible. If this happened, the St. Lawrence River and Welland Canal would be closed to U.S. ships, and people from the Great Lakes area could not compete in eastern markets. Because war did not occur, many of those who initially supported the project soon lost interest (Yeater 2).

The state of Illinois would not allow the canal to be constructed out of its funds; therefore, during the remainder of the 1860s, several legislatures, most notably those from Iowa, Illinois, and New York, endeavored to establish the canal with government backing. Ulysses S. Grant, a resident of Illinois, was elected president in 1868. Because of this, the federal government began responding to the pressure from Illinois; however, the first federal survey was not made until two years later, in 1870. The survey was conducted under the authority of Colonel Wilson of the United States Corps of Engineers and done by Graham P. Low, Civil Engineer and surveyor. Low's plan was for the canal to be 160 feet (49 m) wide and 7 feet (2.1 m) in depth, with 320-by-70-foot (98 by 21 m) locks at the cost of $12,500,000 (equivalent to $318,256,579 in 2025). The United States Senate appointed a committee to study the value of Low's proposal. In 1881, four hundred representatives of commercial, city, and farmers associations from seven states met in Davenport, Iowa, to start a similar group called the Hennepin Canal Commission. It was created to negotiate with Chicago groups to stress the national importance of the canal. The committee concluded that a canal would regulate railroad freight rates (Yeater 3).

Another survey had been made in 1882–83. The surveyor, Major W. H. H. Benyard of the U.S. Corps of Engineers, recommended one of the three proposed routes be selected. The route names were as follows: The Marais d’Osier, Watertown, and Rock Island (Yeater 3). The eastern half of all three routes was the same; the canal would begin at the Illinois River about 1.75 miles (2.8 km) above Hennepin. The significant difference among the three lies at the western half, where the canal would end. In 1886, the United States Congress appointed a Board of Engineers to scrutinize the routes and investigate the effects the canal would have on national commerce. The board reported that benefits would exceed costs, and they suggested that the Marais d’Osier route be selected. The report was accepted by the Secretary of War and the Chief Engineers; however, the route was later rejected because of commercial reasons and the greater military significance that the Rock Island route had to offer (Yeater 3). Fulton and Albany claimed that their cities were an ideal place for the canal, but Rock Island had a larger population and flourishing river port, so it was more convincing to construct at that location (Bastian 138).

Although a survey had been made, from 1886 to 1889 Congress had considered plans but no construction had been started; however, in the year 1890, Congress provided $500,000 ($17,916,667) to start the first five miles (Bastian 3).

Although the canal planning was complete, there were still problems. The planning of the feeder canal still remained. Only one thing was certain; the feeder would tap the water at the Rock River. The river's water would then flow into the main canal. But where should the feeder be constructed (Yeater 4)? The initial suggestion was to place the feeder in Dixon, Illinois, approximately 13 miles (21 km) to the northeast. The citizens of Rock Falls and neighboring Sterling were informed that the War Department would make a decision of the length, cost, and route. As a result, area people began to raise funds (Bastian 138). As these actions were taking place, C.C. Johnson, minority leader of legislature, and C. L. Sheldon went to Washington, D.C., to discuss the matter with Honorable Redfield Potter, Secretary of War. When they returned, a survey was made that showed that the tapping of the river at Rock Falls would be 11 miles (18 km) shorter and cheaper than tapping at Dixon would be; government officials checked figures, and the decision was made to build at Rock Falls (Hennepin Canal Feeder).

=== Construction begins ===
The Hennepin Canal construction project began on September 19, 1890. When construction started, the estimated cost of the project was $6,925,900 ($268,032,330)(Yeater 5). Now that the planning had been approved, construction must be started; however, unlike many American canals, the Hennepin Canal was constructed after railroads came into being. Consequently, eight bridges had to be built. In addition to the railroad bridges, sixty-seven highway bridges had to be constructed too, thus creating delays (Bastian 138).

The commanding engineer asked the Secretary of War to use concrete for the locks. This request was unusual because all locks in that time period were made from cut stone. On May 11, 1891, regardless of what locks were made of in the past, the Secretary of War granted permission to use concrete. Because concrete cost fifty percent less than cut stone masonry, a five-foot width increase would be added to plans (Yeater 5).

After the setbacks, the canal construction continued promptly; however, it did not continue uninterrupted. Workers discovered 3 miles (4.8 km) of peat bog; therefore, the bed of the canal was lined with clay to prevent water loss. In 1894, the construction on the eastern half began. This section was the most difficult because the canal ascends 196 feet (60 m) from the sea level, thus requiring 21 locks to regulate the water. There were 32 locks on the mainline (Yeater 5). All locks measure 170 by 35 feet (52 by 11 m) and were capable of passing barges 140 feet (42.7 m) long. The average barge was twice that size and drew too much water for the six-foot-deep canal (“Builder Tells Early Days of Hennepin Canal” 2). On the feeder canal, there was only one lock, called the guard lock, which was constructed to protect the canal from high river water. All thirty-three locks were manually operated (Yeater 5).

On December 6, 1906, the Sterling Hydraulic Company agreed on the original plan to construct the dam at the foot of Tenth Avenue, Rock Falls (Hennepin Canal Feeder). By 1907, the dam was the only major project left on the canal. The stone excavated from Mile One of the feeder was used to build the dam (Bastian 138). To enclose the construction site, the coffer dam was built (The Hennepin Canal). Twenty-five locks were assembled and riveted. When the dam was finished, it was 1,335 feet (407 m) long (Bastian 140). The dam made the water rise 11 feet 6 inches (3.51 m) above normal level. This led to the covering of 1,936 acres (783 ha) of land. Water backed up all the way to Dixon. Many small islands remain submerged. After the completion of the canal in 1907, the feeder canal runs almost due south for 29.3 miles (47.2 km). The main canal runs 75 miles (121 km) in total (Hennepin Canal Feeder).

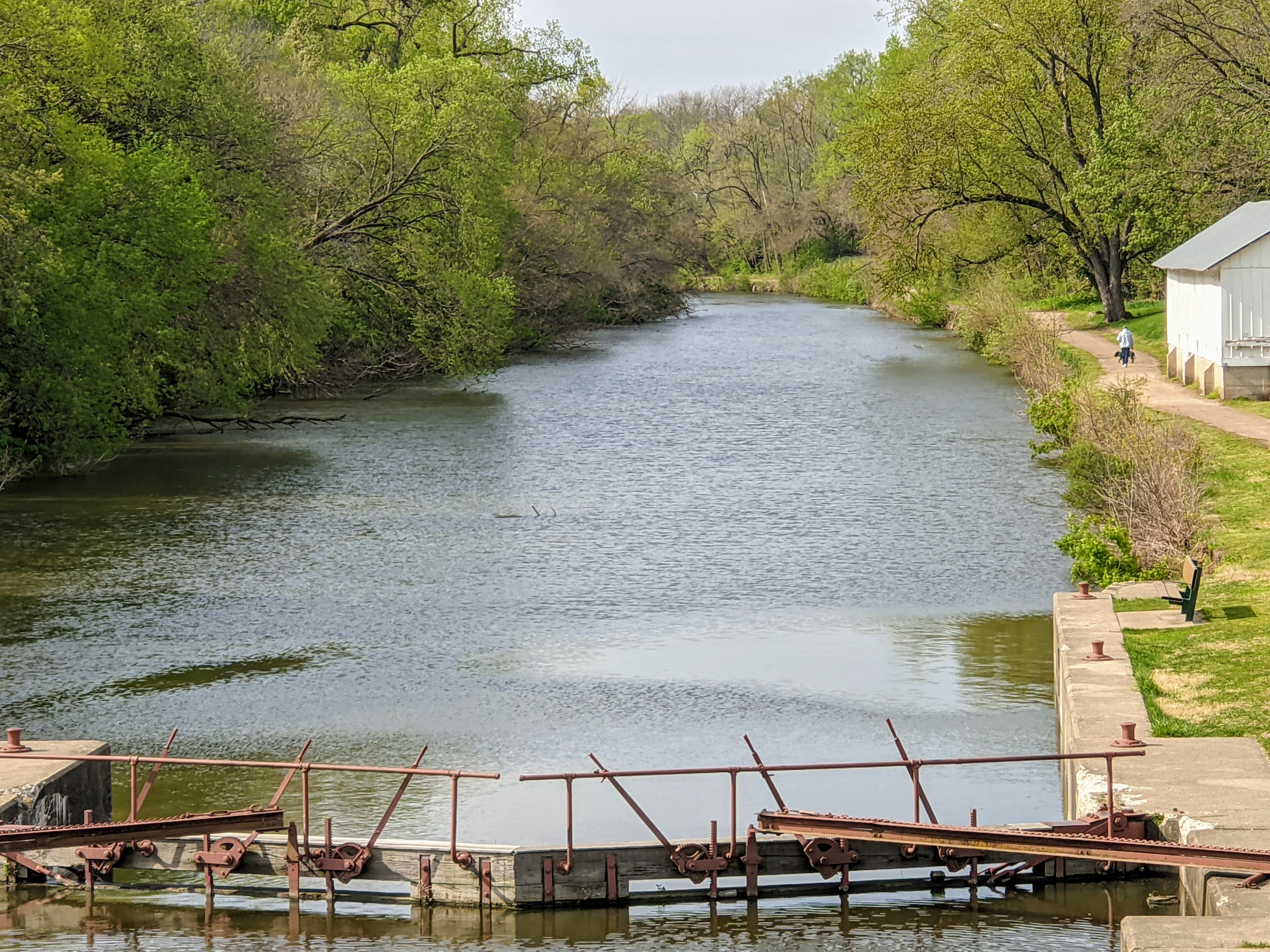
Hennepin Feeder Canal, looking south from its origin on the Rock River in Rock Falls, Illinois.

=== Canal completion and operation ===
One of the greatest crowds ever to gather in Rock Falls happened on October 24, 1907. A two and a half mile street parade in the morning was followed in the afternoon by a parade of boats from Rock Falls, Sterling, and Dixon (Hennepin Canal Feeder). When the canal was finished on October 21, 1907, the Corps of Engineers could not wait until spring for the first boat to pass down the canal. The first steamer to use the canal was the SS Marion, carrying government officials. This was the first boat to travel the entire length of the canal. The boat left on November 8 and returned on the November 15th. The canal was not completely filled, so each section's water had to be moved with the locks for the boat to pass. The boat had to be equipped with iron guards to break the formed ice. When it reached Lock 28, it had to push the lock open. When the boat reached the last 5 miles (8.0 km) of her journey, there was still a problem with the amount of water. There was too much water, and it could not pass under the Rock Island Bridge. As a result, the first people the sailors found were asked to come aboard to make the ship sink slightly (Yeater 6). Guests at the opening ceremony included Governor Charles S. Deneen, former Minnesota Governor Samuel R. Van Sant, who was born at Rock Island, and Congressman Frank Orren Lowden. Miss Grace Wheeler, the daughter of the chief engineer, opened the gates for the first time (Hennepin Canal Feeder).

The early years were difficult because 1930 marked the beginning of the Great Depression. The Depression affected local businessmen and residents. In that year, overall tonnage on the canal decreased by 40 percent, and only 18,142 tons were transported (Yeater 9). A telephone system was built by the Corps of Engineers so that a lockman could be advised in advance when a boat was coming through the locks. There were 750-pound poles spanning across 104 miles (167 km) of the canal. Some of these poles remain standing today (Yeater 10).

The canal was not only a route to transport coal, salt, grain, gravel, iron, steel, and many other crops and minerals, but it was a place for recreation as well. Family and friends would participate in picnics, swimming, and most noteworthy, fishing. Fish caught in the Hennepin Canal still hold Illinois records. Swimming was also popular, so popular, in fact, that the local YMCAs held swimming classes in the canal (Yeater 11).

The Corps of Engineers employed fifty men full-time, year-round to operate and maintain the canal. The Corps divided the canal into sections. Each section had a lockman and/or a patrolman. Some of their tasks included patrolling banks, repairing breaks, operating the locks, servicing phone systems, etc. The lockmen and patrolmen were provided houses, barns, warehouses, sheds, and workshops. All of the houses had concrete walks and many other concrete things. The houses were never wired with electricity and did not have indoor plumbing. Every lockman and patrolman had a house but one. He did, however, have a houseboat.

=== Abandonment of commercial use ===
Although the canal was not as successful as planned, some good came from it. In 1920, Ray Mechling and Fred Wolf of Rock Falls began a barge line. The canal required smaller barges so the two bought a steamboat and began erecting barges. They bought gravel and transported it to people who were interested in buying some. Besides gravel, they shipped steel and coal for the International Harvester Company (Yeater 12).

Traffic on the canal was never heavy, and critics complained that it was obsolete when it was constructed and that it was too small and only fit for the early days of canaling. One local man stated, “It was a source of frustration and ultimately a failure”. Many have said if the canal had been constructed in the 1830s, 1840s, 1850s or even the 1860s, as it was originally suggested, the canal would have had greater economic potential. The canal was intended to connect the Upper Mississippi River Valley with the Atlantic Ocean; however, it did not (Yeater 12). However, the canal did give farmers relief from railroad prices (Builder Tells Early Days of Canal). In 1948, there was no reported traffic (Bastian 142). From the frustration came anger. This anger was, as many people would say, coming from the bad deterioration that the canal was suffering. It would cost $12,000,000 to make the canal bigger and deeper and make the locks larger (Yeater 12). Consequently, on April 7, 1948, the Corps of Engineers issued a “navigation notice” that put the canal on a limited-service basis. All the chaos led to the suspension of all lock operations and non-essential maintenance in 1951 (Yeater 12). Legislators in Washington, D.C., and in Springfield were getting innumerable letters and petitions from Illinois citizens and conservationists. These groups organized campaigns with “Save the Canal” as their theme. The legislators of Illinois began to plan to take over the canal for recreation use. On August 1, 1970, full ownership was given to the state of Illinois to use the waterway as a place for recreations under the jurisdiction of the Department of Conservation. Bud Stigall stated that in 1970, it would cost 22 million dollars to get the canal in shape.

== Legacy and modern use ==
The Hennepin was the first American canal built of concrete without stone cut facings. Although the Hennepin enjoyed only limited success as a waterway, engineering innovations used in its construction were a bonus to the construction industry. The canal was used as a training ground for engineers who later worked on the Panama Canal. Both the Hennepin and Panama Canals used concrete lock chambers and both used a feeder canal from a man-made lake to water the canals because both needed water to flow uphill.

From its inception in 1834 to its closure in 1951, the canal served as both a waterway and a place for recreation. Today, canal is managed by the Illinois Department of Natural Resources and continues to be used for recreational purposes. The canal's hiking and biking path, including the feeder path to the Rock River, extends the trail to 155 miles. While the trail is typically only open to hikers and bikers, certain portions of the trail are open to horseback riding and snowmobiling seasonally. Non-motorized boating, kayaking and canoeing are also open on the canal itself, though because the canal was originally built for commercial use, several nonoperational but still-present locks must be portaged by watercraft users traversing certain sections of the Hennepin. Fishing is allowed on the canal, and the canal is considered to be an excellent place to fish. Fish species in the canal include bass, bluegill, and catfish, as well as trout. Swimming, however, is prohibited.

Several campgrounds and day use areas are located all along the canal. These include the Izaak Walton League of America’s Geneseo Chapter, Geneseo Campground, Ludeen’s Landing in East Moline, and several DNR day use and/or camping parks at Lock 6, Lock 11, Lock 17, Lock 21, Bridge 14, Lock 22, Bridge 23, Lock 23, and Lock 26. The canal’s Visitor Center is located off the trail near Sheffield, Illinois.

The nonprofit organization Friends of the Hennepin Canal works “[t]o maintain and develop recreational and educational opportunities and assist in the preservation of the historical features of the Hennepin Canal Parkway”. Five of the locks have been restored to working condition, although they are not used. All of the gates from the remaining locks have been replaced with concrete walls, creating a series of waterfalls. The organization hosts events, including many coordinated with and approved by the Illinois DNR.
