= Annawan Community Unit School District 226 =

School district in Bureau County, Illinois, United States

Address
- 501 West South Street Annawan, Illinois, 61234; United States

District information
- Type: Public
- Grades: PreK–12
- NCES District ID: 1703810

Students and staff
- Students: 330

Other information
- Website: annawan226.org

Annawan Community Unit School District 226 is a public school district in Annawan, Illinois. The district is composed of 120 square miles (310 km^{2}). The Annawan Grade School was built in 1974 west of the Annawan High School (1959).

The district serves over 230 students from Annawan, Hooppole, and Mineral.
