= Bishop Hill =

Bishop Hill may refer to:

- Bishop Hill, Illinois, a village in Henry County
  - Bishop Hill State Historic Site, Illinois, site of the former
    - Bishop Hill Colony, a 19th-century religious commune
- Bishop Hills, Texas, a small town near Amarillo, Texas
- Bishop Hill, a hill in the Lomond Hills in Perth and Kinross, Scotland
- Bishop Hill, another name of Woh Chai Shan, a hill in Shek Kip Mei, Hong Kong
- Bishop's Hill Wood, Wickwar, South Gloucestershire UK
- A global warming blog by Andrew Montford

== See also ==
- Bishophill, an area of York in England
