= David Ivar Swanson =

American politician

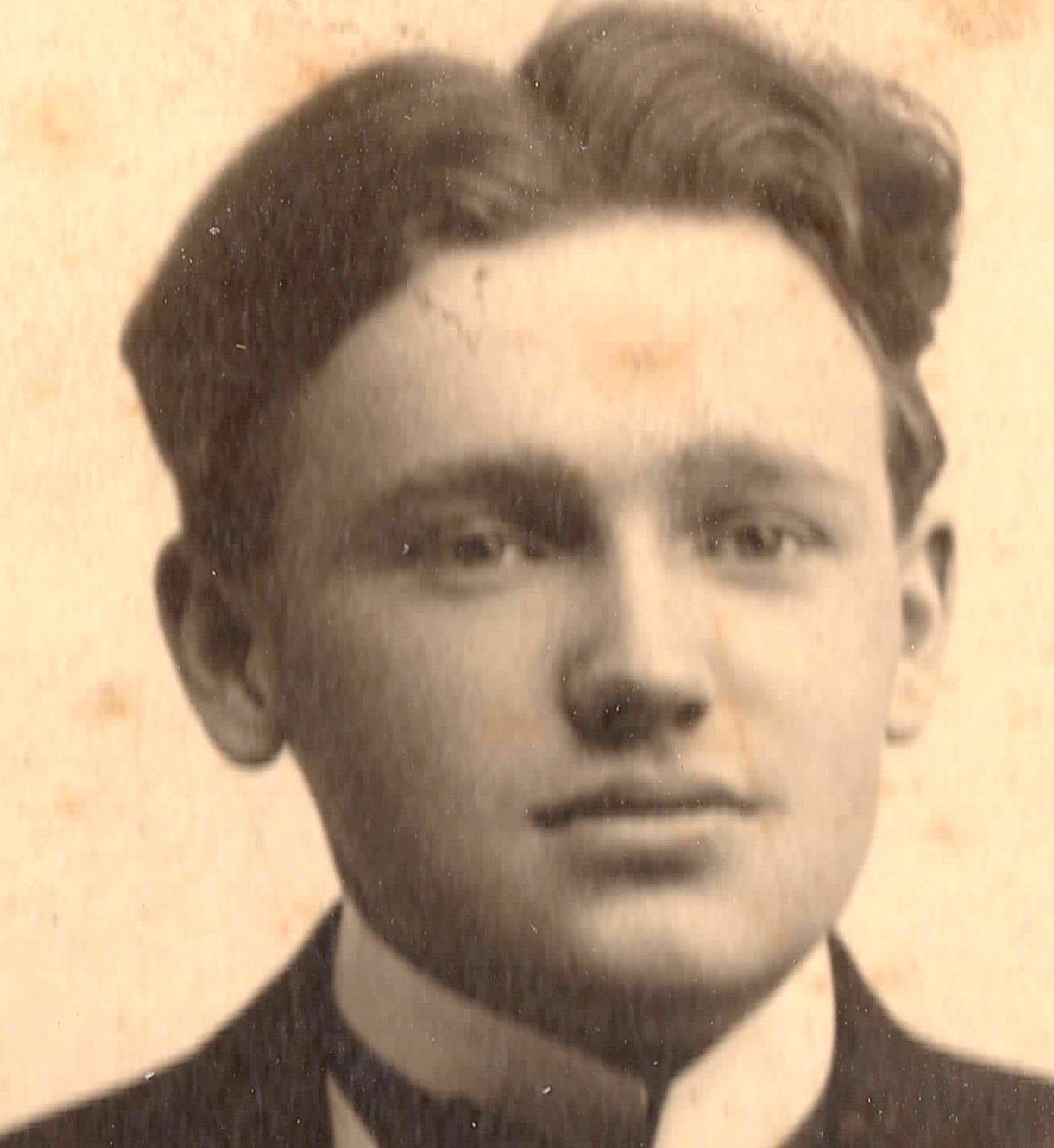
- Swanson circa 1906

Member of the Illinois House of Representatives from the 11th district
- In office 1922 – 1950 (Excluding 1946-48)

Personal details
- Born: David Ivar Swanson; September 14, 1884 Chicago, Illinois, United States
- Died: April 8, 1950 (aged 65) Chicago, Illinois, USA
- Party: Republican
- Spouse(s): Ruth Agnew, Margaret Ulreka Carlson
- Children: Stanley Carlson, Wilbert Carlson
- Education: Chicago public schools, John Marshall Law School (Chicago)

David Ivar Swanson (September 14, 1884 – April 8, 1950) was an Illinois state representative (Republican Party).

He served as Representative from the 53rd through the 66th General Assemblies, except for the 60th and 64th legislative sessions. He was Chairman of the Committee on Judiciary for the 54th–57th, 62nd–63rd and 65th Assemblies.

During the 1945 session, Swanson was legal adviser to the Speaker of the House in the state capitol of Springfield. During the 65th session, he was Republican House caucus chairman and member of the Policy Committee.

== Childhood ==
David Ivar Swanson was born in Chicago, Illinois to John and Beata Swanson, immigrants from Sweden, and raised at 531 West 56th Place, Chicago. Most of the Swanson's immediate neighbors were Swedish immigrants or children of Swedish immigrants. In the 1880s, the Sweden-born population in Chicago numbered more than 43,000. Many of these lived in largely Swedish-American neighborhoods.

Swanson was the oldest of five children. His siblings were Ruth, Almeda, Henry and Joel. His father was a carpenter constructing the interiors of Pullman railroad passenger cars.

In 1900 at age fifteen, Swanson was working as an errand boy while attending Chicago public schools.

== Early career ==
In 1910 Swanson at age 25 was living with parents, brothers, and sisters, working as an assistant buyer in at Swift and Company a meat packing business while attending the John Marshall Law School (Chicago) in the evenings. He graduated in 1912 and was admitted to the Bar in 1913. On June 29, 1913, he married Ruth E. Agnew who was 19.

Following Swanson's admission to the bar in 1913, he was associated with the Lumberman's Mutual Casualty Company. Afterwards, he set up his own law practice appearing before federal and state courts, and handling a large volume of litigation in real estate, criminal law, commercial law and probate law.

Swanson was a member of the committee on banking, building and loan associations, and insurance.

During World War I, Swanson served with the Motor Transport Corps at Camp Meigs, Washington, D.C. Also in 1918, Swanson was nominated for the state legislature on the Republican ticket, but lost.

Four years later in 1922, he ran successfully for the Illinois state legislature. By this time, he and Ruth had divorced.

In 1923 Swanson married Margaret Ulreka Carlson. Margaret had two sons from a previous marriage, Stanley, age 9, and Wilber age 6. Swanson adopted the two boys. They lived at 622, 62nd Street, Chicago.

== Political career and life ==
Swanson served 24 years as an Illinois state legislature between the years 1922-1946 and 1948-1950. During the one term he was not in the Illinois assembly, Swanson was the attorney to the Speaker of the House in Illinois' state capitol, Springfield.

In 1912 Swanson was elected Secretary of the newly established Judicial Advisory Council chartered to study laws relating to judicial organization, criminal law, and criminal and civil procedure, and establish relationships with similar councils of other states.

Swanson served as Hearing Referee for the Division of Correction.

In addition to his political career, he built a good reputation as a lawyer in Southtown (Chicago).

Swanson found time to collect stamps of the United States, and read American Civil War history. He was an enthusiastic fisherman, and liked to travel. Swanson's stepson, Harry Carlson said, "While other political figures were going to Hot Springs or Florida, dad traveled down the Mississippi River on a steamboat five times to observe the South at first hand. He enjoyed smoking cigars.''

By 1940 David, Margaret and Harry were living at 7842 Marshfield Avenue, a working-class neighborhood. The occupations of their neighbors included fireman, reporter, janitor, office clerk, wheat inspector, sewing machine operator, milkman, sales lady, telephone operator, chemist, guard and auto mechanic. None of the neighbors appear to be of Scandinavian origin. The David I. Swanson family was an element of the ethnic melting pot of Chicago.

By religious denomination, Swanson was baptist and he was a lay preacher.

Swanson died of a heart attack in the headquarters of the 18th Ward Republican organization in the Englewood Masonic Temple on 64th and Green Streets on election night, April 8, 1950. During the day, voters had chosen him by a wide margin as one of the two men who would represent the Republican party in the November election for state representative at Springfield, Illinois, the state's capitol.

== Legacy ==
With the exception of one term between 1946 and 1948, Swanson remained a State of Illinois Representative until his death. Of his work, one person said that "Dave knew how to get things done in the legislature. He worked to weed out bad proposals and got behind good ideas and pushed to make them into laws."

The Daily News said of Swanson, "He has fought machine politics - both in the Democratic party and in his own party, the Republican. He has worked diligently for efficiency in government." "Throughout his long career, Swanson has been a real leader in the House."

Swanson aided the creation of Bishop Hill State Park in 1945. Bishop Hill was the site of a utopian religious community founded in 1846 by Swedish pietist Eric Jansson, and was the home of Swedish American folk artist Olof Krans.

Upon his death, the Chicago City Council passed a resolution stating, "Whereas: This city council has learned with regret and sorrow of the untimely death of the Honorable David I. Swanson, for many years a state representative of the 11th Senatorial district, and whereas, during his lifetime Mr. Swanson endeared himself to many of the citizens of the city of Chicago by his kindly and generous disposition, his sincere charity and his devotion to the cause of justice and right, and whereas his was a sympathetic and magnanimous nature revered, respected and admired by all who were privileged to know him intimately and to call him friend - Now, therefore, be it resolved that in recognition of his worth as a man and the service rendered by him in civil life, this City council do, by rising vote, recognize in solemn tribute the esteem of the citizens of Chicago of Mr. Swanson's ability; and be it further resolved that this resolution be spread upon the records of the city of Chicago....

== Memberships ==
Viking, Svithiod Fraternities, Nordic Law Club, Legislative Chairman Englewood Business Men's Association, South Side Real Estate Board (Chicago), Delta Theta Phi law fraternity, Chicago Bar Association, Illinois State Bar Association, American Judicature Society, Thoburn Methodist Church, Freemason, Independent Order of Odd Fellows (I.O.O.F.), YMCA, Chicago Council, Boy Scouts of America, Kiwanis
