= Eric Bergland =

Swedish-born American military officer (b. 1844 - d. 1918)

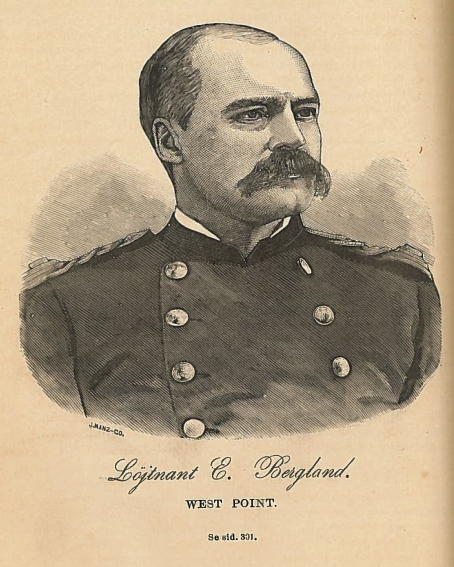
- Born: Erik Andersson Berglund; April 21, 1844; Alfta, Sweden
- Died: November 3, 1918 (aged 74); Baltimore, Maryland, U.S.
- Burial place: Green Mount Cemetery
- Spouse: Lucy Scott McFarland Bergland
- Military career
- Allegiance: United States; Union
- Branch: Union Army; United States Army
- Service years: 1861–1896
- Rank: Major
- Units: 57th Illinois Vols. Inf. 5th U.S. Artillery; Corps of Engineers
- Conflicts: American Civil War; Battle of Fort Donelson; Battle of Shiloh; Siege of Corinth; Second Battle of Corinth; Battle of Resaca

Eric Bergland (April 21, 1844 – November 3, 1918) was a Swedish-born American military officer. The son of religious refugees that brought him from Sweden to the United States, he fought in the American Civil War as a volunteer officer, graduated from West Point at the top of his class, served his adopted country with distinction as an officer of the regular army, a professor of his alma mater, and a Western explorer, and married a cousin of the wife of president Rutherford B. Hayes.

== Early life ==
Bergland was the son of Anders Olsson Berglund, a farmer who became a follower of the charismatic revivalist Eric Jansson, whose teachings brought him and his followers into a fierce conflict with the Lutheran Established Church of Sweden. The government persecuted Jansson and his followers, and they decided in 1847 to emigrate to the United States, in search of religious freedom. Anders Berglund and his family, including the three-year-old Erik, followed their fellow believers to Illinois, where they participated in the creation of the Bishop Hill Colony. After the murder of Eric Jansson, his father broke with his old faith, becoming a preacher in the local Methodist Church. At the age of 12 Bergland became an apprentice in the printing office of the Swedish-language paper Svenska Republikanaren in Galva. When the paper was moved to Chicago, the Bishop Hill Colony, who owned the printing press, made him manager of the office that remained in Galva.

== Civil War ==
When the American Civil War began, the Bishop Hill Colony raised a volunteer company, and offered it to United States service. The company became Company D, 57th Illinois Volunteer Infantry Regiment, and Bergland, although only 17 years old, was elected second lieutenant. He fought at the battles of Fort Donelson, Shiloh, First and Second Corinth, and Resaca, and was promoted to first lieutenant after Shiloh. In the fall of 1864, Bergland received an appointment to West Point. He took an extension on the appointment, remained on the rolls of the regiment, but served as a military engineer in Ohio till the end of the war.

== Military career ==
Bergland graduated from West Point in 1869, at the top of his class. His place on the graduation list would have given him a commission in the Corps of Engineers, but all the billets were full, and he became a second lieutenant in the 5th Artillery. Among his classmates who served as general officers were Samuel Escue Tillman, William P. Duvall, Earl Dennison Thomas, Charles Morton, and William W. Robinson Jr. Among his prominent classmates who did not attain general's rank were Arthur Sherburne Hardy, John Gregory Bourke, and James Ezekiel Porter.

While with the 5th Artillery, Bergland participated in the 1870 U.S. Army intervention to prevent Fenian raids into Canada. Two years later he was transferred to the Engineers as a first lieutenant. Bergland served between 1873 and 1883 several periods at West Point as instructor and professor, only interrupted by three years on Western exploration under George Wheeler, 1875–1878. During these three years he travelled over 2,000 miles on mules and on foot, surveying in California, New Mexico, Arizona, Nevada and Colorado. Promoted to captain in 1884, he served on a variety of engineering posts in Tennessee, Mississippi, Louisiana, Arkansas, and Texas, as well as company commander, and instructor at the Corp's School of Application. The last years of his military career Bergland spent as a lighthouse engineer. He was promoted to major in 1895 and retired a year later. In his retirement, the family lived in Baltimore.

== Personal life ==
Bergland married Lucy Scott McFarland in 1878. She was a cousin of President Rutherford B. Hayes's wife Lucy Webb Hayes. They had four children, John, Eric, William, and Mary Brita. Their oldest son, John, became a well-known obstetrician.

Bergland died on November 3, 1918. He was buried in Green Mount Cemetery.
