= List of United States Military Academy top-ranking graduates =

U.S. Military Academy Coat of Arms

The United States Military Academy (USMA) is an undergraduate college in West Point, New York that educates and commissions officers for the United States Army. This article lists those alumni of the military academy who graduated top, or first, in their class.

All USMA cadets are rated each year; and get a final rating when they graduate. The cadet with the highest class rank is the one that has the best combination of score, academic standing, additional merits and demerits. The United States Military Academy opened in 1802, the initial class having just two cadets. The academy started the practice of ranking its graduates in 1818.

== Top-ranking graduates ==
Year	Name	Highest rank	Notability	Sources
1802	Joseph Gardner Swift	Colonel; Bvt. brigadier general	First graduate ever, superintendent of the military academy (1812–1814) and Chief of engineers; resigned 1818, surveyor of the port of New York, government civil engineer.	
1803	Walker Keith Armistead	Colonel; Bvt. brigadier general	Chief of engineers 1818–1821; colonel 3rd U.S. Artillery	
1804	Samuel Gates	Second lieutenant	Resigned 1805; merchant.	
1805	George Bomford	Colonel	Chief of ordnance; inspector of arsenals, inventor and designer of weapons and defensive installations.	
1806	William Gates	Colonel; Bvt. brigadier general	Given active assignment at age 75 in 1863.	
1807	Justus Post	Colonel	Quartermaster general 1814–1815; disbanded 1815, becoming farmer, judge, engineer and Missouri state senator.	
1808	Daniel A. A. Buck	Captain	Disbanded 1815; lawyer, representative and speaker Vermont House of Representatives, U.S. Congressman; clerk, War Department, Treasury Department	
1809	Christopher Van Deventer	Major	Chief clerk in the War Department 1817–1827; resigned due to financial scandal.	
1810			No one graduated this year	
1811	Alexander J. Williams	Captain	Son of Jonathan Williams, first superintendent of West Point. Killed in action at Fort Erie 1814.	
1812	Joseph M. Wilcox	First lieutenant	Killed in action and scalped by Creek fighters 1814	
1813	George Trescott	First lieutenant	Only graduate 1813; resigned 1819, becoming a civil engineer and rice planter.	
1814	George Gardiner	Captain	Killed in action against hostile Seminoles 1835	
1815	Henry Middleton	Second lieutenant	Resigned 1816; graduated from law school 1822, never practiced; author.	
1816			No one graduated this year	
1817	Augustus Roumfort	Second lieutenant, USMC	Resigned 1818; military storekeeper, Ordnance Department 1834–1841; mayor of Harrisburg, Pennsylvania 1863–1866	
1818	Richard Delafield	Brigadier general Bvt. major general	7th, 11th, and 13th superintendent of the military academy (1838–1845, 1856–1861 and 1861), chief of engineers (1864–1866)	
1819	William A. Eliason	Captain	Served in the Corps of Engineers; died in New York at age 39.	
1820	Stephen Tuttle	1st lieutenant	Served in the Corps of Engineers; died in Florida at age 37.	
1821	Edward H. Courtenay	2nd lieutenant	Second lieutenant, resigned 1829; professor at West Point 1829–1834; then college professor and civil engineer.	
1822	George Dutton	Major	Served in the Corps of Engineers; died in Philadelphia at age 54.	
1823	Alfred Mordecai	Major	Served in the Ordnance Dept., asst. professor of natural and experimental philosophy & asst. professor of engineering at the military academy, observer in the Crimean War 1855–1857; resigned 1861.	
1824	Dennis Hart Mahan	2nd lieutenant	Military theorist that heavily influenced Civil War tactics; taught engineering at the military academy for over 40 years.	
1825	Alexander D. Bache	2nd lieutenant	Superintendent of the United States Coast Survey, served as vice president of the U.S. Sanitary Commission during Civil War	
1826	William H. C. Bartlett	2nd lieutenant	taught natural and experimental philosophy at the military academy for 37 years	
1827	Ebenezer S. Sibley	Lieutenant colonel	served in the artillery and in the Quartermaster Department	
1828	Albert E. Church	1st lieutenant	taught mathematics at the military academy for 46 years	
1829	Charles Mason	Bvt. 2nd lieutenant	Asst. professor of engineering at the military academy. Highest graduating score in USMA history, and famous for graduating one slot ahead of Robert E. Lee, who had the second highest score in USMA history.	
1830	Alexander J. Swift	Captain	served in the Corps of Engineers, died after he became sick during the Siege of Veracruz 1847	
1831	Roswell Park	2nd lieutenant	Served in the Corps of Engineers; resigned in 1836, becoming a scholar, a clergyman and an author.	
1832	George W. Ward	1st lieutenant	Served in the artillery; resigned in 1836, becoming a merchant at Matagorda Bay, Texas.	
1833	Frederic A. Smith	Captain	Served in the Corps of Engineers; died 1852 at the age of 40.	
1834	William D. Fraser	Captain; Bvt. major	Served in the Corps of Engineers; died at Key West at the age of 42.	
1835	George W. Morell	2nd lieutenant (USA); Brigadier general (USV); Major general (USV) (unconfirmed)	Served in the Corps of Engineers; resigned 1837, becoming a lawyer and a judge in New York State, also colonel of NY militia; commanded an infantry division in the American Civil War.	
1836	George L. Welcker	Captain	Served in the Corps of Engineers; died 1848 at age 36.	
1837	Henry W. Benham	Colonel (USA); Bvt. major general (USA); Brigadier general (USV)	Commanded the Engineer Brigade of the Army of the Potomac.	
1838	William H. Wright	1st lieutenant	Served in the Corps of Engineers; died in 1845 at age 31.	
1839	Isaac I. Stevens	1st lieutenant (USA); Bvt. major (USA); Major general (USV)	Served in the Corps of Engineers; commanded an infantry division when he was killed at the Battle of Chantilly 1862.	
1840	Paul O. Hébert	Lieutenant colonel (USA); Bvt. colonel (USA); Brigadier general (CSA)	Governor of Louisiana, 1853–1856. During the Civil War he participated in the Confederate Defense of Vicksburg and the Battle of Milliken's Bend.	
1841	Zealous B. Tower	Colonel (USA); Bvt. major general (USA); Brigadier general (USV)	Served in the Corps of Engineers, superintendent of the military academy (1864–1866)	
1842	Henry L. Eustis	2nd lieutenant (USA); Brigadier general (USV)	Served in the Corps of Engineers; resigned in 1849, becoming professor of engineering at Harvard University; commanded an infantry brigade during the American Civil War.	
1843	William B. Franklin	Colonel (USA); Bvt. major general (USA); Major general (USV)	Served in the Corps of Topographical Engineers; commanded an infantry corps during the American Civil War.	
1844	William G. Peck	1st lieutenant	Served in the Corps of Topographical Engineers; resigned in 1855, becoming professor of mathematics and astronomy at Columbia University.	
1845	William H. C. Whiting	Captain (USA); Major general (CSA)	Died as a POW in New York in 1865.	
1846	Charles Seaforth Stewart	Colonel; Brigadier general, Retired	Served in the Corps of Engineers	
1847	John C. Symmes	Captain	Served in the Ordnance Department; retired 1861 due to disability from disease and exposure in the line of duty.	
1848	William P. Trowbridge	1st lieutenant	Served in the Corps of Engineers; resigned in 1856, becoming an assistant to the superintendent of the United States Coast Survey; served as a civilian engineer during the American Civil, in charge of supplying engineering materials for the field armies; after the war, professor at Columbia and Yale.	
1849	Quincy A. Gilmore	Colonel (USA); Bvt. major general (USA); Major general (USV)	Served in the Corps of Engineers, commanded an infantry corps during the American Civil War	
1850	Frederick E. Prime	Major; Bvt. colonel (Note: Declined brevet as Brigadier General)	Served in the Corps of Engineers	
1851	George L. Andrews	2nd lieutenant (USA); Brigadier general (USV); Bvt. major general (USV)	served in the Corps of Engineers, was an infantry and staff officer during the American Civil War, became professor of French at the military academy	
1852	Thomas L. Casey	Brigadier general	Chief of engineers	
1853	James B. McPherson	Brigadier general (USA); Major general (USV)	served in the Corps of Engineers, killed at the Battle of Atlanta 1864 while commanding the Army of the Tennessee	
1854	Custis Lee	1st lieutenant (USA); Major general (CSA)	Eldest son of Robert E. Lee, served in the Confederate States Army during the American Civil War.	
1855	Cyrus B. Comstock	Brigadier general (USA); Bvt. major general (USA)	served in the Corps of Engineers	
1856	George W. Snyder	1st lieutenant (USA); Bvt. major (USA)	served in the Corps of Engineers	
1857	John C. Palfrey	Captain (USA); Bvt. Brigadier General (USA); Lieutenant colonel (USV)	served in the Corps of Engineers	
1858	William C. Paine	Captain	served in the Corps of Engineers	
1859	William E. Merrill	Lieutenant colonel (USA); Bvt. colonel (USA); Colonel (USV)	served in the Corps of Engineers	
1860	Walter McFarland	Lieutenant colonel	served in the Corps of Engineers	
1861 (May)	Henry A. du Pont	Captain; Bvt. lieutenant colonel	served in the artillery	
1861 (June)	Patrick O'Rorke	1st lieutenant (USA); Bvt. colonel (USA); Colonel (USV)	killed at the Battle of Gettysburg 1863 while in command of the 140th New York Infantry regiment	
1862	Ranald S. Mackenzie	Brigadier general (USA); Bvt. major general (USA)	served in the Corps of Engineers as well as in the artillery, infantry and Cavalry	
1863	John R. Meigs	1st lieutenant (USA); Bvt. major (USA)	served in the Corps of Engineers, was killed during the American Civil War in 1864	
1864	Garrett J. Lydecker	Brigadier general	served in the Corps of Engineers	
1865	Charles W. Raymond	Brigadier general	served in the Corps of Engineers	
1866	Henry M. Adams	Brigadier general	served in the Corps of Engineers	
1867	Ernest H. Ruffner	Colonel	served in the Corps of Engineers	
1868	Albert H. Payson	Captain	served in the Corps of Engineers	
1869	Eric Bergland	Major	Served in the Corps of Engineers; was a 1st lieutenant of 57th Illinois Volunteer Infantry Regiment during the American Civil War	
1870	Francis V. Greene	Captain (USA); Major general (USV)	served in the Corps of Engineers, participated in the Russo-Turkish War (1877–1878) with the Russian Army, commanded infantry during the Spanish–American War	
1871	James R. Wasson	Colour Sergeant (USV); Major (USA); Colonel (Japanese Army)	enlisted during the Civil War and the Philippine–American War, left the U.S. Army four times (mustered out twice, resigned once and dismissed once), also served in the Imperial Japanese Army	
1872	Rogers Birnie	Colonel	served in the Ordnance Department, was a civil army consultant during World War I	
1873	William H. Bixby	Brigadier general	Chief of engineers	
1874	Thomas W. Symons	Colonel	served in the Corps of Engineers	
1875	Smith S. Leach	Colonel	served in the Corps of Engineers	
1876	John R. Williams	Colonel	served in the Coastal Artillery, asst. professor of French (1878–1883)	
1877	William M. Black	Major general	Chief of engineers	
1878	George M. Derby	Lieutenant colonel	served in the Corps of Engineers	
1879	Frederic Vaughan Abbot	Brigadier general	Commandant of Engineer School 1917–1918, acting chief of engineers 1919–1920	
1880	Oberlin M. Carter	Captain	Dismissed 29 September 1899, and sentenced to pay a fine of $5,000 and be confined five years in a penitentiary, by order of a general court martial.	
1881	John Millis	Colonel	Department Engineer, Southeast Department during World War I	
1882	Edward Burr	Brigadier general	Commanded 62nd Field Artillery Brigade on Western Front in World War I	
1883	George A. Zinn	Colonel	Son of Union Army colonel Henry I. Zinn; Division Engineer, North Pacific Division during World War I	
1884	Irving Hale	Brigadier general		
1885	Joseph E. Kuhn	Major general	Commanded 79th Division on Western Front in World War I	
1886	Henry C. Newcomer	Brigadier general	Assistant Director of Chemical Warfare Service	
1887	Francis R. Shunk	Colonel	Grandson of Pennsylvania governor Francis R. Shunk; Department Engineer, Northeastern Department during World War I	
1888	Henry Jervey	Major general	Served as Director, Operations Division, General Staff during World War I	
1890	Edgar Jadwin	Lieutenant General	Director of Division of Light Railways and Roads, AEF	
1891	Spencer Cosby	Colonel	Engineer commissioner of the District of Columbia 1908–1909; commanded 5th, 605th, 209th Engineers	
1892	James B. Cavanaugh	Colonel	Cavanaugh House (the U.S. Army Corps of Engineers district commander's residence), at the Chittenden Locks, in Ballard, Seattle, are named after him.	
1893	George P. Howell	Colonel		
1894	William B. Ladue	Colonel	Commanded 314th, 603rd, 211th, 1st, 11th Engineers; engineer commissioner of the District of Columbia 1927–1930	
1895	Edward H. Schulz	Colonel (National Army); Lieutenant colonel (Regular Army)	Served in the Engineers, as regimental and district commander.	
1896	Edwin R. Stuart	Lieutenant colonel		
1897	William D. Connor	Major general	Chief of staff SOS AEF 1918–1919; commanding general SOS AEF 1919; commandant, Army War College 1927–1932; superintendent and commandant, United States Military Academy 1932–1938	
1898	Frank C. Boggs Jr.	Colonel		
1899	James A. Woodruff	Major general	Commandant, Engineer School 1921–1924; director Command and General Staff School, 1928–1931; commanded Hawaiian Division 1938–1939	
1900	George B. Pillsbury	Brigadier general	Commanded 115th Engineers, 40th Division and 102nd Engineers, 27th Division in France; assistant to Chief of engineers 1930–1937	
1901	Edward N. Johnston	Colonel		
1902	William A. Mitchell	Brigadier general	Officer in World War I receiving the Distinguished Service Medal and the Croix de Guerre and was an officer of the Legion of Honor. After the war he became a professor of engineering at West Point and while there revised many of the textbooks for his department.	
1903	Douglas MacArthur	General of the Army (US); Field Marshal (Philippine Army)	Corps of Engineers; chief of staff, brigade commander, and commander of the 42nd Infantry "Rainbow" Division during World War I; superintendent of the military academy (1919–1922); chief of staff of the U.S. Army; commanded the U.S. Forces in the Southwest Pacific Area during World War II; Supreme Commander for the Allied Powers in charge of Occupied Japan; commanded the United Nations Command during the Korean War; awarded the Medal of Honor, Grand-croix of the French Légion d'honneur, Congressional Gold Medal, 3 Distinguished Service Crosses, and 7 Silver Stars	
1904	Charles R. Pettis	Colonel		
1905	Dewitt C. Jones	Colonel		
1906	Harold S. Hetrick	Colonel		
1907	James G. Steese	Colonel		
1908	Glen E. Edgerton	Major general	Governor of Panama Canal Zone 1940–1944	
1909	Stuart C. Godfrey	Brigadier general	Chief air engineer, CBI 1943–1945	
1910	Frederick S. Strong Jr.	Brigadier general	Command North West Service Command 1944; UK Base 1945	
1911	Philip B. Fleming	Major general	Federal Works administrator 1941–1949; Ambassador to Costa Rica 1951–1953	
1912	Howard S. Bennion	Colonel	served in the Corps of Engineers during World War I	
1913	Francis K. Newcomer	Brigadier general	Governor of Panama Canal Zone 1944–1949	
1914	William H. Holcombe	Brigadier general	Commander Ramgarh Training Area	
1915	William E. R. Covell	Major general	served in the Corps of Engineers and the Quartermaster Department	
1916	John Howard Wills	Major	awarded Distinguished Service Cross for actions on 21 July 1918; killed in action on 29 July 1918	
1917 (April)	Harris Jones	Brigadier general	awarded Distinguished Service Cross for actions in World War I; professor of mathematics, USMA 1931–1947; dean of Academic Board, USMA 1947–1956	
1917 (August)	Herman H. Pohl	Colonel		
1918 (June)	John Paul Dean	Major		
1918 (November)	David W. Griffiths	Colonel		
1919	Louis George Horowitz	Colonel	served in the Corps of Engineers, his son James Salter also graduated in 1945	
1920	James B. Cullum	Colonel		
1921	Morris H. Marcus	Colonel		
1922	Charles J. Bartlett	Colonel	CG 84th Infantry Division	
1922 (June)	Frank L. Beadle	Colonel		
1923	Frank R. Johnson	First lieutenant	Rhodes Scholar	
1924	Wallace H. Hastings	Colonel		
1925	Charles H. Barth Jr.	Brigadier general	Killed in air crash in Iceland that also killed Lieutenant General Frank M. Andrews on 5 May 1943	
1926	William C. Baker Jr.	Major general		
1927	Hans W. Holmer	Colonel	Served as assistant professor of mechanics at West Point. During World War II he was engineer, Army Ground Forces, at Headquarters, Army Ground Forces. After the war he served as director of the Transport Office of the Allied Military Government in Germany.	
1928	Luke W. Finlay	Brigadier general	Resigned as second lieutenant of engineers to study law at Yale, becoming a lawyer in 1934 and counsel for Standard Oil Company in 1938. He returned to the army during the war, serving as executive officer to the general commanding the Transportation Corps. After the war he was several times recalled to service, in 1952 serving in Europe with the diplomatic rank of minister.	
1929	Horace F. Sykes Jr.	Colonel		
1930	Paul F. Yount	Major general	In charge of military railways in Iraq, Iran and Burma during World War II. chiefof Transportation, Department of the Army (1953 to 1958).	
1931	Kenneth A. McCrimmon	Brigadier general	Commanding general, First Logistical Command. Legion of Merit 1961.	
1932	Rush B. Lincoln Jr.	Major general	Chief of transportation (1962–1963)	
1933	Kenneth E. Fields	Brigadier general	Awarded the Silver Star as commander of 1159th Engineer Combat Group at the Battle of Remagen in 1945. Received the Army Distinguished Service Medal in 1955 for his contributions to the development of thermonuclear weapons.	
1934	Charles F. Tank	Brigadier general	Participated in the invasion of North Africa as a staff officer, and in the Battle of Anzio as CO of a combat engineer battalion. Transferred from the Engineers to the Transportation Corps in 1950, he served as commanding general of several transportation commands. During his career he was awarded the Silver Star, the Bronze Star, and the Legion of Merit.	
1935	John D. Bristor	Colonel	District engineer, US Army Corps of Engineers, Detroit District, 1950–1953.	
1936	Oliver G. Haywood Jr.	Brigadier general, USAF	Doctor of Science and chief of the Air Force Office of Scientific Research.	
1937	Arthur W. Oberbeck	Lieutenant General	CG 1st Infantry Division, Joint Task Force Eight	
1938	John R. Jannarone	Brigadier general	Professor of physics and chemistry at West Point; dean of the Academic Board, 1965–1973.	
1939	Stanley W. Dziuban Sr.	Colonel		
1940	Harold C. Brown	Colonel	Served with the Corps of Engineers in New Guinea and the Philippines in WWII. Received a Master of Nuclear Science at the University of Chicago in 1948. Served as district engineer for USACE in Galveston, Texas. Retired from the Army to the Seattle area in 1966 and worked for Boeing until his final retirement.	
1941	Alfred J. F. Moody	Brigadier general	Assistant division commander of the 1st Cavalry Division during the Vietnam War.	
1942	James Hart Hottenroth	Colonel	Army Corps of Engineers. Served in WWII, Korea and Vietnam, where he commanded 159 Engineer Group in 1965.	
1943 (January)	Dimitri A. Kellogg	Colonel		
1943 (June)	Thomas K. Oliver	Lt. colonel		
1944	James F. Scoggin Jr.	Colonel		
1945	Dwight A. Riley Jr.	First lieutenant		
1946	Wesley Posvar	Brigadier general	Rhodes Scholar; taught at the Air Force Academy	
1947	Robert M. Montague Jr.	Brigadier general	Son of Lieutenant General Robert Miller Montague. Vietnam War strategist who later served as executive director of the Joseph P. Kennedy Jr. Foundation and the Special Olympics.	
1948	Joseph M. Kiernan Jr.	Lieutenant colonel	Killed in a helicopter crash while on a combat reconnaissance flight near Bien Hoa, South Vietnam on 3 June 1967	
1949	Richard T. Carvolth III	Captain	Rhodes Scholar; killed in a plane crash while making a night instrument take-off at Oxnard Air Force Base, California, on 10 July 1954	
1950	William B. DeGraf	Colonel	served as an enlisted soldier during World War II and received a battlefield promotion to 2nd lieutenant in 1945, later served in Korea and Vietnam	
1951	Gordon E. Danforth	Colonel	served as Air Force pilot	
1952	Harry L. Van Trees	First lieutenant	Sc.D.EE, MIT professor of electrical engineering, MIT MIT loaned him to DoD where he was chief scientist of the Defense Communications Agency, chief scientist of the U.S. Air Force, Assistant Secretary of Defense for C3I. Received IEEE Kilby Gold Medal in signal processing, elected to the National Academy of Engineering in 2015.	
1953	Ed D. Davis	Colonel	Earned his pilot's wings in the Air Force before serving in logistics and training posts, retired in 1981	
1954	Marion F. Meador	Lieutenant colonel	Resigned in 1974	
1955	Lee D. Olvey	Brigadier general	Rhodes Scholar; Retired in 1989	
1956	Robert A. Stewart	Colonel	USAF; MIA 12 May 1967, later declared dead	
1957	John H. Vickers	Colonel	Retired in 1980	
1958	George W. P. Walker	Second lieutenant	Died in a civilian small plane crash, 31 January 1959	
1959	James L. Abrahamson	Colonel	Professor of history at USMA, Army War College and Campbell University. Author of several books. Died 12 October 2020	
1960	Charles P. Otstott	Lieutenant General	Commanded 25th Infantry Division. Deputy chairman of the NATO Military Committee from 1990 to 1992	
1961	John L. Kammerdiener	Major		
1962	John H. Fagan Jr.	Second lieutenant	Retired with disability 1963	
1963	Homer J. Holland	Major	Resigned in 1972	
1964	Jere M. Richardson	Captain	Resigned in 1968	
1965	Daniel W. Christman	Lieutenant General	Superintendent of the military academy (1996–2001), retired in 2001	
1966	Wesley K. Clark	General	Rhodes Scholar, commander of SHAPE during the Kosovo War, retired in 2000	
1967	Ernest C. Heimberg Jr.	Captain		
1968	Lamar C. Ratcliffe Jr.	Colonel		
1969	Howard J. Von Kaenel	Major general	Rhodes Scholar	
1970	Jack Carl Zoeller	Captain	Rhodes Scholar. Founder, Purefy. Has been a CEO in the financial services industry for over 30 years, including at EF Hutton Indemnity. He served as a US Army Ranger and infantry commander in the 82nd Airborne, and holds degrees from the Harvard Kennedy School and Oxford University.	
1971	John William Murray Moore MD, MPH	LTC Army Medical Corps	Physician chief of pediatric cardiology, Walter Reed AMC (1986–1991); chief of pediatric cardiology, Rady Children’s Hospital and UC San Diego Medical School (2006–2021)	
1972	Timothy T. Lupfer	Lieutenant colonel	Rhodes Scholar	
1973	Jay C. Willis	Major		
1974	Ralph H. Graves	Colonel	served in the Corps of Engineers	
1975	John M. McMurray	Lieutenant colonel		
1976	Danny Mac Davis	Colonel	Rhodes Scholar	
1977	Greg A. Bowers	Captain		
1978	Jeffrey W. Long	Major	Olmsted Scholar	
1979	Bert Mizusawa	Major general		
1980	Chris C. Casciato	Captain		
1981	Kenneth P. Fleischer	Captain		
1982	Peter R. Mansoor	Colonel	General Raymond Mason Chair of Military History, Ohio State University	
1983	Mark S. Martins	Brigadier general	Rhodes Scholar; Served as chief prosecutor of military commissions from 2009 to 2021	
1984	Patrick M. Wray	Captain		
1985	Lawrence M. Young	Captain	served as infantry officer, resigned in 1990, later graduated from Yale	
1986	Mike Pompeo	Captain	resigned in 1991, formerly served as Director of the Central Intelligence Agency. Formerly served as United States Secretary of State.	
1987	Michael F. Garceau	Captain		
1988	Doug Fraley	Captain	Rhodes Scholar	
1989	Patrick A. Brown		Marshall Scholar; oncology and pediatrics faculty at Johns Hopkins University	
1990	Edward P. Hoyt		Marshall Scholar	
1991	Richard O. Burney	Colonel	Marshall Scholar; Surgeon	
1992	John R. Sadler Jr.	Captain		
1993	Marc Wehmeyer	Lieutenant colonel		
1994	Todd Morgenfeld		Pinterest CFO	
1995	Rebecca E. Marier (McGuigan)	Lieutenant colonel	First female valedictorian; Harvard Medical School graduate, General Surgeon	
1996	John R. Hughes			
1997	Adam K. Ake	Brigadier general	Rhodes Scholar, Assistant U.S. Attorney	
1998	W. Patrick Connelly	Captain		
1999	Walter R. Cooper III	Lieutenant colonel	Rhodes Scholar	
2000	William W. F. Parsons	Colonel		
2001	Seth A. Bodnar	Lieutenant colonel	Rhodes Scholar, President of University of Montana	
2002	Brian Clymer	Captain		
2003	Brodie Hoyer	Lieutenant colonel		
2004	Daniel G. Kang	Colonel	Georgetown University School of Medicine graduate. Orthopaedic spine surgeon.	
2005	Michael D. April	Lieutenant colonel	Rhodes Scholar. Harvard Medical School graduate.	
2006	Jonathan Bate	Lieutenant colonel	on active duty, formerly an Economics Instructor at United States Military Academy	
2007	Gregory J. Stevens	Major		
2008	Scott Y. Yang	Captain		
2009	Brady Dearden	Captain	on active duty	
2010	Elizabeth Betterbed	Major	Second female valedictorian; Rhodes Scholar, on active duty, currently serves in the Corps of Engineers	
2011	Marc Beaudoin	Major		
2012	Alexander George Pagoulatos	Captain		
2013	Adam Leemans	Captain	USAR, currently serves in the Corps of Engineers	
2014	Louis S. Tobergte	Captain	Rotary Scholar (University of Leeds), Defense Ventures Fellow (Cohort 12)	
2015	Courtland R. Adams	Captain		
2016	Joshua D. Allyn	Captain		
2017	Hugh P. McConnell	Captain		
2018	Joy E. Bledsoe (née Schaeffer)	Captain	Third female valedictorian. Marshall Scholar. Currently on active duty.	
2019	David Bindon	1st lieutenant		
2020	Lynne D. Mooradian	1st lieutenant	Fourth female valedictorian	
2021	Justin Michael Gittemeier	2nd lieutenant		
2022	Holland F. Pratt		Rhodes Scholar	
2023	Kai L. Youngren		Rhodes Scholar	
2024	Skyler J. Chauff	2nd lieutenant	Medical Service Corps Officer	
2025	Edward Chen	2nd lieutenant	Hertz Fellow	

== Notes ==
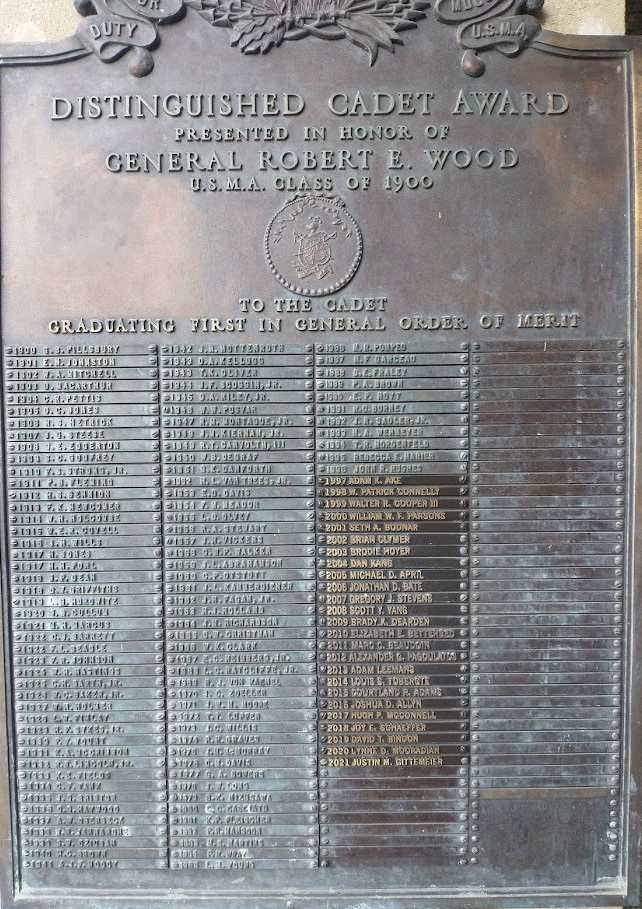
USMA Distinguished Cadet Plaque, Eisenhower Barracks

== Works cited ==
a: Cullum, George W. (1879). Biographical Register of the Officers and Graduates of the United States Military Academy, at West Point, New York, since its establishment in 1802. West Point, NY: United States Military Academy Library.
b: Heitman, Francis B. (1903). Historical Register and Dictionary of the Officers United States Army. Washington, DC: Government Printing Office.

c: Hoppin, C. J. (2009-04-24). Same Date of Rank - Grads at the Top and Bottom from West Point, Annapolis and the Air Force Academy. Xlibris Corporation. ISBN 9781453524411.

d: Association of Graduates, United States Military Academy (1990). Register of Graduates and Former Cadets of the United States Military Academy (Eisenhower Centennial Editions ed.). West Point, NY: Association of Graduates, United States Military Academy.
