= 57th Illinois Infantry Regiment =

57th Regiment Illinois Volunteer Infantry "National Guards"
- Illinois state flag
- Active: December 26, 1861, to July 7, 1865
- Country: United States
- Allegiance: Union
- Branch: Infantry
- Engagements: Battle of Shiloh; Battle of Resaca; Battle of Kennesaw Mountain; Siege of Atlanta; March to the Sea; Battle of Bentonville

The 57th Regiment Illinois Volunteer Infantry was an infantry regiment that served in the Union Army during the American Civil War.

== Service ==
The 57th Illinois Infantry was organized at Shawneetown, Illinois, and mustered into Federal service on December 26, 1861, to serve for three years. At the expiration of the enlistment period, the original members were mustered out, except reenlisted veterans. The regiment, composed of veterans and recruits, were maintained in service until it was mustered out on July 7, 1865.

== Total strength and casualties ==
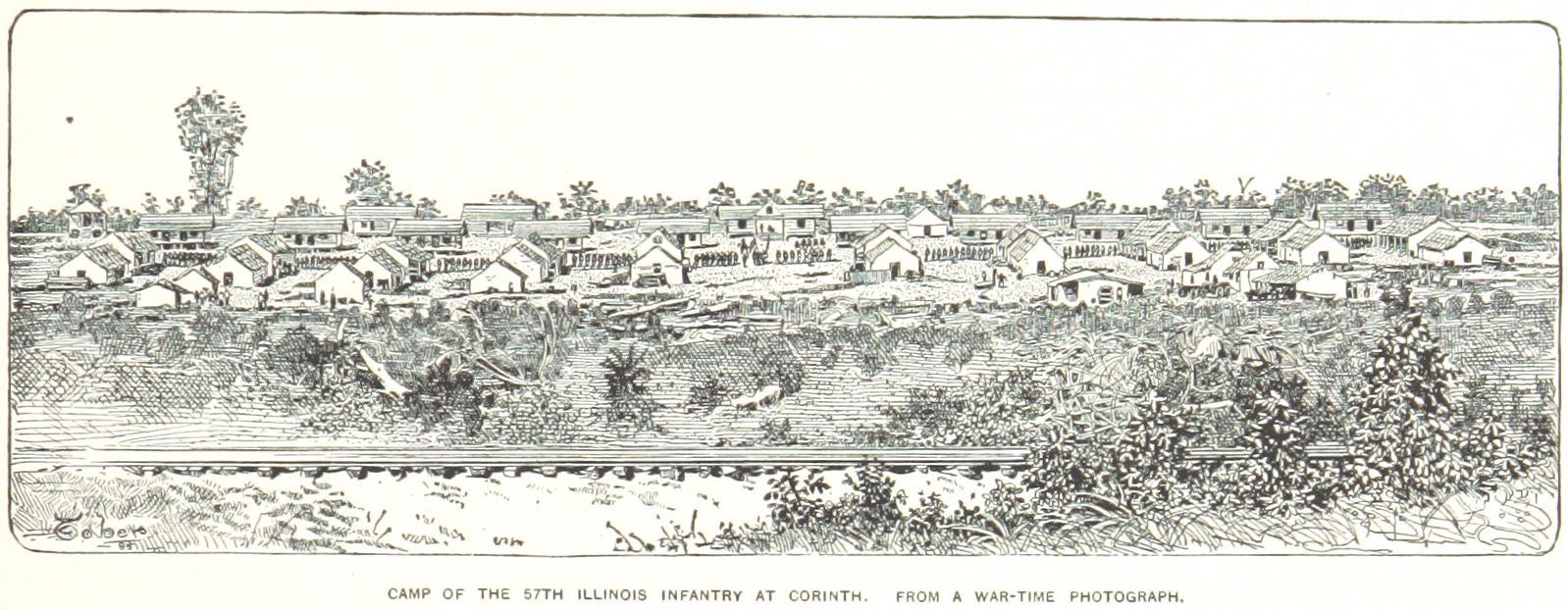
The camp of the 57th Illinois at Corinth

1862- Investment and capture of Fort Donelson, Tenn., February 14–16, 1862. Moved to Fort Henry, Tenn., February 17; thence to Crump's Landing, Tenn., March 8–13, and to Pittsburg Landing March 28. Battle of Shiloh, Tenn., April 6–7. Advance on and siege of Corinth, Miss., April 29-May 30. Pursuit to Booneville May 31-June 6. Duty at Corinth, Miss., until November, 1863. Battle of Corinth October 3–4, 1862. Pursuit of enemy to Hatchie River October 5–12. At Corinth until April, 1863. Grant's Central Mississippi Campaign November, 1862, to January, 1863.

1863 - Operations against Forrest in West Tennessee December 18, 1862, to January 3, 1863. Dodge's Expedition to Northern Alabama April 15 – May 2, 1863. Great Bear Creek, Cherokee Station and Lundy's Lane April 17. Rock Cut, near Tuscumbia, April 22. Tuscumbia April 23. Town Creek April 28. At Corinth until November. Grand Junction, Tenn., July 30, 1863.

1864 - Moved to Eastport, Pulaski and Lynnville November 6–12, and duty there until March, 1864. Atlanta (Ga.) Campaign May to September, 1864. Demonstrations on Resaca May 8–13. Sugar Valley, near Resaca, May 9. Near Resaca May 13. Battle of Resaca May 14–15. Ley's Ferry, Oostenaula River, May 14–15. Rome Cross Roads May 16. Operations on line of Pumpkin Vine Creek and battles about Dallas, New Hope Church and Allatoona Hills May 25 – June 5. Operations about Marietta and against Kennesaw Mountain June 10 – July 2. Assault on Kennesaw June 27. Ruff's Mills July 3–4. Chattahoochie River July 5–17. Decatur and battle of Atlanta July 22. Siege of Atlanta July 22 – August 25. Scout from Rome to Cedar Bluffs, Ala., July 28–29 (Detachment). Flank movement on Jonesboro August 25–30. Battle of Jonesboro August 31 – September 1. LoveJoy Station September 2–6. Moved to Rome September 26, and duty there until November 11. Battle of Allatoona October 5 (Cos. "A," "B"). Reconnaissance along Cave Springs Road and minor conflicts took place on October 12 and 13. The famous March to the Sea campaign occurred between November 15 and December 10. On December 9, there were engagements near the Ogeechee River and Canal. The Siege of Savannah unfolded from December 10 to December 21.

1865 - Campaign of the Carolinas January to April, 1865. Salkehatchie Swamp, S.C., February 2–5. South Edisto River February 9. North Edisto River February 11–12. Congaree Creek February 15. Columbia February 16–17. Battle of Bentonville, N. C., March 20–21. Occupation of Goldsboro March 24. Advance on Raleigh April 10–14. Occupation of Raleigh April 14. Bennett's House April 26. Surrender of Johnston and his army. March to Washington, D.C., via Richmond, Va., April 29 – May 19. Grand Review May 24. Moved to Louisville, Ky., June 3. Mustered out July 7, 1865. The regiment suffered 3 officers and 65 enlisted men who were killed in action or mortally wounded and 4 officers and 108 enlisted men who died of disease, for a total of 180 fatalities.

== Commanders and others ==
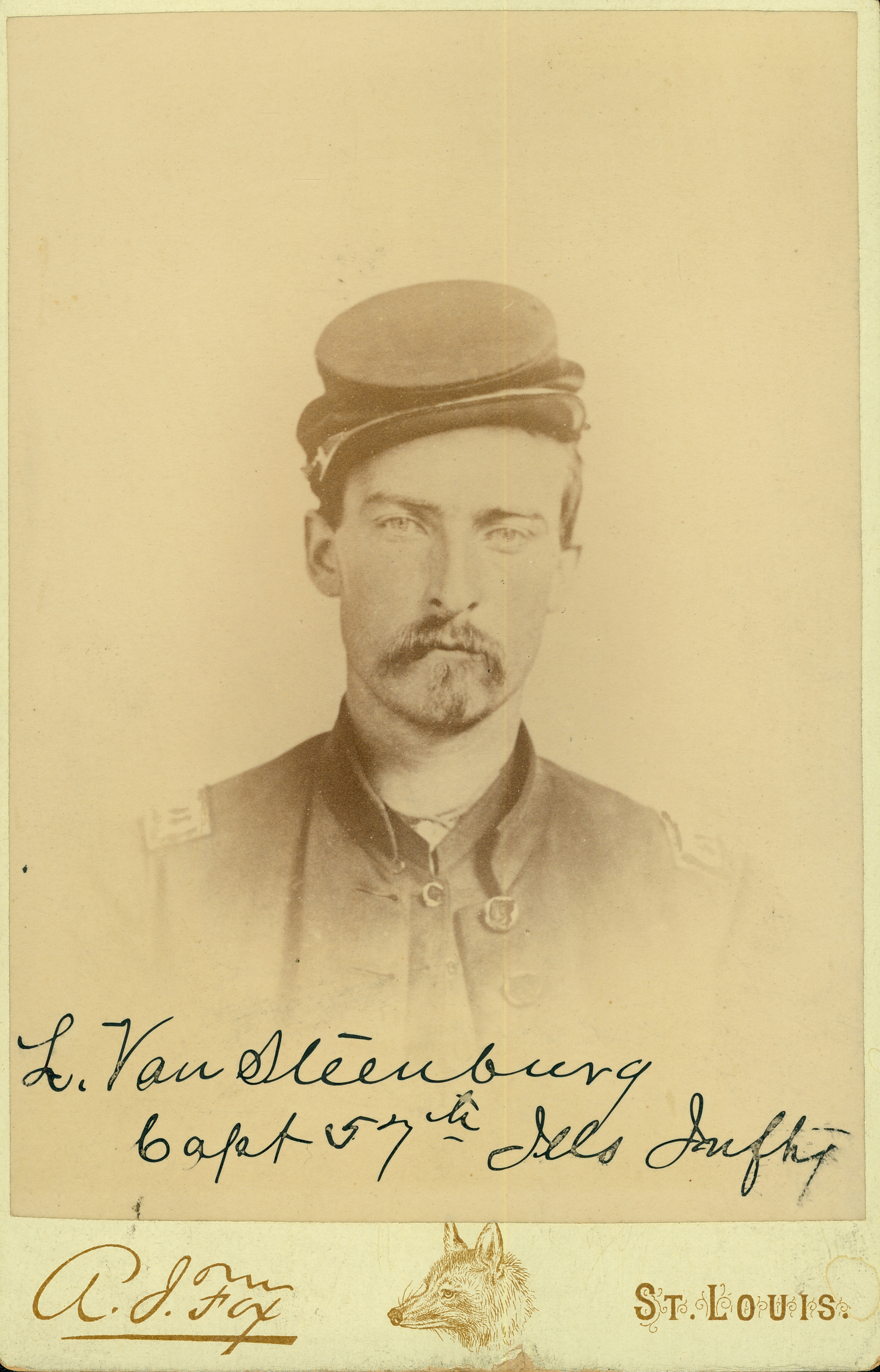
Linas van Steenburg, Captain, 57th Illinois Infantry. Mustered out at the expiration of term, Oct. 16, 1864.

- Colonel Silas D. Baldwin - dismissed on March 12, 1863.
- Colonel Frederick Hurlbut - drowned in the Chicago River on May 8, 1865.
- Lieutenant Colonel Frederick A. Battey - mustered out in 1865 with the regiment.
- Major Norman B. Page, killed in action at the Battle of Shiloh.
- Major Eric Forsse, mustered out at the expiration of term, Oct. 16, 1864.
- Captain Robert D. Adams, killed in action at the Battle of Shiloh.
- First Lieutenant Theodore M. Dogget, died of wounds received at the Battle of Shiloh.
- First Lieutenant Eric Bergland, Company D, later graduated at the top of his West Point class.
- Sergeant Olof Krans, the naïve painter from Bishop Hill, was given a disability discharge on June 3, 1862.

== See also ==
- List of Illinois Civil War Units
- Illinois in the American Civil War
