= Olof Gustaf Hedstrom =

Swedish-American minister (1803–1877)

Rev. Olof Gustaf Hedstrom
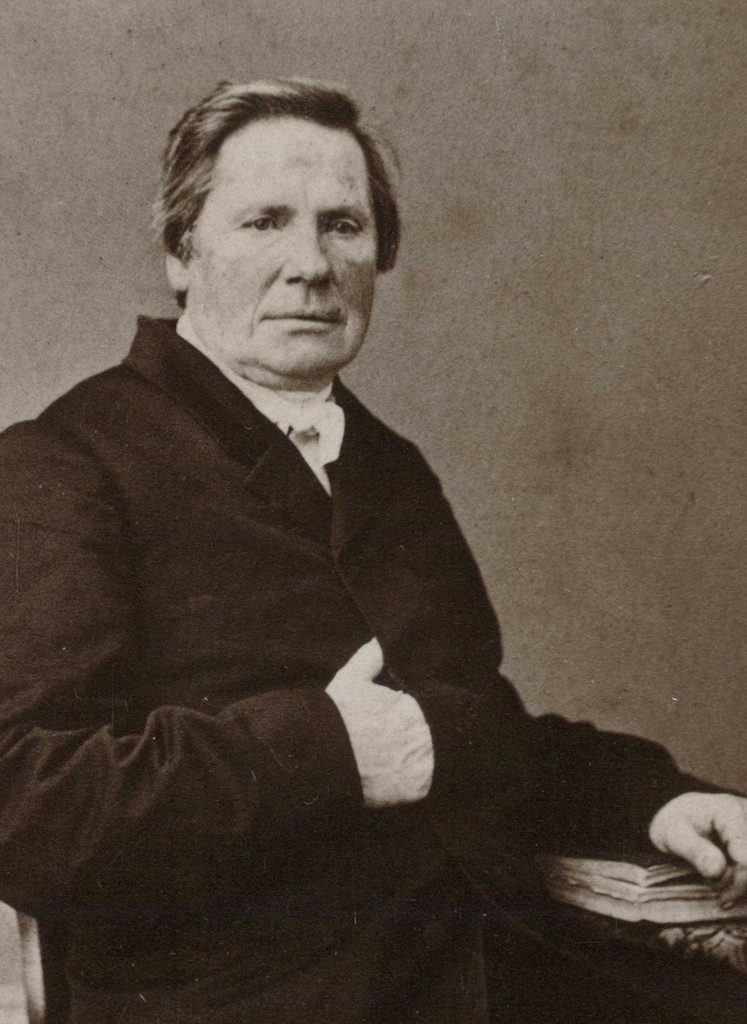
- Rev. O.G. Hedstrom, United Methodist Archive Center, Drew University Library, Madison New Jersey
- Born: Olof Gustaf Hedström; 11 May 1803; Nottebäck, Kronoberg, Sweden
- Died: 5 May 1877 (aged 73); New York City, New York, U.S.
- Occupations: clergyman; church leader

Olof Gustaf Hedstrom (11 May 1803 – 5 May 1877) was a Swedish-American minister who oversaw the Bethel Ship mission serving sailors and immigrants arriving in New York City from 1845-1876. Hedstrom's ministry influenced Swedish settlement patterns in the United States and established the earliest Swedish Methodist congregations in New York, Pennsylvania and Illinois. Hedstrom trained a ministerium of Scandinavian pastors aboard the Bethel Ship mission who went on to lead parishes and missions throughout the United States as well as establishing the Methodist church in Scandinavia.

== Early life ==
Olof Gustaf Hedström was born in 1803 in the Småland region of Sweden to Johan Carlsson Hedström and Annica Persdotter. His father was a corporal in the Östra Härads Company of the Kalmar Regiment stationed at soldier's croft No. 29 at Tvinnesheda in Nötteback parish, Kronoberg. At age sixteen Hedstrom left home to apprentice as a tailor and migrated to neighboring Blekinge county.

In 1825 the Swedish government sold through an intermediary two ships of the line and three frigates to the Navy of the Republic of Columbia. In Karlskrona (Bleckinge) the twenty-two-year-old Hedstrom signed-on as the clerk to the captain of the Swedish frigate Chapman. The Chapman and Tapperheten sailed to Cartagena, Colombia but in March 1826 they were redirected to New York City after the deal failed. The crew of the ships were discharged in New York and the ships were sold at auction.

Hedstrom's wages and return fare to Sweden were then stolen in a sailor's boarding house. Stranded in New York City, Hedstrom found work in the shop of tailor named Townsend and became an unintentional immigrant. On June 11, 1829, he married Caroline Pinckney, a cousin of Townsend. Pinckney was a Methodist and Hedstrom became a member of the Second Street Methodist Episcopal Church shortly after their marriage. In 1830 the Hedstroms moved to Pottsville, Pennsylvania, where he opened a clothing store.

O. G. Hedstrom returned to his native Sweden in May 1833. In addition to visiting his family, he spoke with many about his religious experiences in America. He returned to New York City in October 1833 accompanied by his two younger brothers, Jonas and Elias.

== Career ==
Hedstrom became active in the Methodist church upon his return from Sweden and was named an Exhorter in the church. In 1835 Hedstrom was received on trial in the New York Conference and was assigned at the next conference as a circuit preacher in the Catskill region north of New York City. He served as a minister in six different local circuits (Charlotte, Jefferson, Coeymans, Windham, Catskill, and Prattsville) from 1835 to 1844. Rev. Dr. Daniel Steele a professor of Theology at Boston University recounted his experience as a youth in Windham listening to Hedstrom's preaching:

In his sermons he displayed an extraordinary seriousness. No person ever doubted his sincerity or the genuineness of his conversion. He had a burning zeal for souls which conquered indifference and opposition. Those who came to criticize his broken English often remained to pray. His warmheatedness and sympathy increased greatly the influence of his sermons.

=== The Bethel Ship mission in New York harbor ===
In 1844 Peter Bergner and Dr. David Terry established a mission in the New York City harbor sponsored by the Methodist church. The North River Bethel Society served sailors and immigrants and was located in a ship renamed the John Wesley and moored between Pier 10 and 11 on the Hudson River on the west side of lower Manhattan. At the 1845 New York conference of the Methodist church, Hedstrom was named minister of this new mission. He served the North River Mission, commonly referred to as the Bethel ship or Bethelskeppet, for three decades.

O. G. Hedstrom preached in the retrofitted floor below deck of the John Wesley. The Bethel Ship often served as a refuge. From the ship, Hedstrom rowed out to meet incoming ships from Scandinavian countries where he distributed Bibles and tracts and invited immigrants to visit the Bethel Ship. His ministry was not limited to Scandinavians and his record book show marriages to an assortment of nationalities. Rev. O. G. Hedstrom and assistant minister Sven B. Newman visited Jenny Lind during her first visit to New York City in September 1850. The Bethel ship mission was one of the charities that received donations from Jenny Lind as a result of her concerts. In 1851 Lind attended a service at the Bethel Ship and met with Hedstrom and later corresponded with the minister.

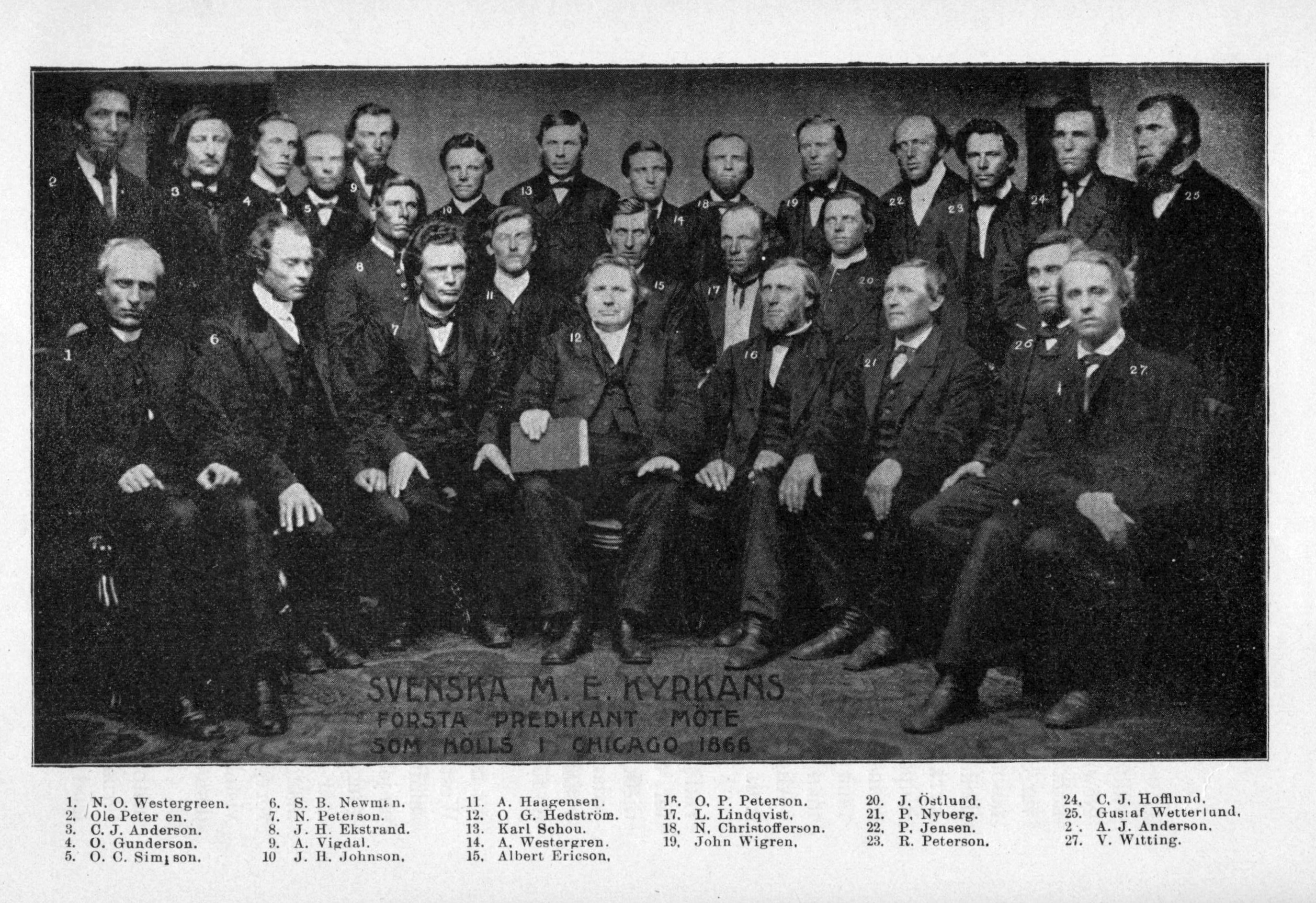
O. G. Hedstrom (seated at center) at a meeting of Swedish Methodist ministers, Chicago, 1866.

=== Hedstrom and the training of Scandinavian Methodist ministers ===
The Bethel Ship mission came to act as a training ground for new ministers serving Scandinavian Methodist congregations in America. Sven B. Newman, Victor Witting, Ole Peter Petersen, Nels O. Westergreen, among many other ministers served at the North River Mission.

=== The influence of Hedstrom on Swedish settlement locations ===
The work of O. G. Hedstrom at the Bethel Ship mission had an important influence on the settlement of Swedish immigrants in the United States.

- In 1845 Peter Cassel and his party arrived in New York with plans to settle in Wisconsin. Cassel met Peter Dahlberg onboard the Bethel Ship and instead traveled with him to Jefferson County, Iowa where Cassel established the New Sweden community.
- In 1845 Olof Olson and the advance team for the Janssonists arrived in New York City and stayed for some time onboard the Bethel ship. In 1846 Jonas Hedstrom and Olof Olson traveled with Jansson and his followers to Illinois where Eric Janson established the Bishop Hill Colony in Henry County.
- In 1846 O. G. Hedstrom likely directed passengers of the Swedish bark Virginia to travel away from New York City when they arrived in America with insufficient funds. About fifty passengers ended their travels in Buffalo, New York, unable to reach their destination of New Sweden, Iowa. In 1847 most of the passengers of the Virginia continued their travels west but settled in Andover, Illinois, near Bishop Hill. In 1848 a dozen remaining passengers of the Virginia settled in Sugar Grove, Warren County, Pennsylvania and established the Swedish community centered on Jamestown, New York.

In 1875, O. G. Hedstrom retired from the ministry after forty years of service and moved to Cape May, New Jersey.

== Later life ==
Olof Gustaf and Caroline Hedstrom lived at 4 Carlisle Street near the Bethel Ship mission. They had many children but only one survived infancy, Dr. Wilbur Fisk Hedstrom (1839-1928). The couple adopted a daughter, Mary Elizabeth (Hedstrom) Prevost (1835-1839). A year after retiring, O. G. Hedstrom fell sick while visiting New York City and died there on 5 May 1877. Hedstrom was buried in Green-Wood Cemetery in Brooklyn. His wife, Caroline (Pinckney) Hedstrom, died in 1890.
