= American Judicature Society =

Non partisan organization

Seal of the American Judicature Society.

The American Judicature Society (AJS) is an independent, non-partisan membership organization working nationally to protect the integrity of the American justice system. AJS's membership — including judges, lawyers, and members of the public — promotes fair and impartial courts through research, publications, education, and advocacy for judicial reform. The work of AJS focuses primarily on judicial diversity, judicial ethics, judicial selection, access to justice, criminal justice reform, and the jury system.

== History ==
The American Judicature Society was established in 1913 as an independent, nonprofit, nonpartisan organization with the purpose of improving the administration of justice in the United States, and to increase public understanding of the justice system.

At its peak, the AJS was a national and international organization that counted over 50,000 lawyers, judges, and layman from all 50 states, Canada, and 43 other countries as members. AJS was the original "fair courts" citizen organization. An outgrowth of Progressivism, it represented a response to demands for law reform that had been building for a number of years. For 101 years, AJS worked nationally to protect the integrity of the American justice system through research, publications, education and advocacy for judicial selection reform. The Society's work has led to modernized administrative structures, stronger judicial ethics codes, and merit-based systems of selecting judges in many states. It has served as a voice for the public's interest in effective courts, promoting greater transparency in judicial proceedings, and enhancing access to justice for all. Among its notable accomplishments are the development of the Missouri Plan for judicial selection, the creation of state judicial conduct commissions and judicial nominating committees and publication of its award winning peer-reviewed journal, Judicature. The AJS Board voted to dissolve the national organization on September 26, 2014.

== Operations ==
In 2014, due to funding constraints, AJS operations shifted from the Dwight D. Opperman Center at Drake University to the AJS Hawaii Chapter. Due to donations from groups including the National Center for State Courts, the Duke Law Center for Judicial Studies, the Hunter Center of the Communities Foundation of Texas, and the South Texas College of Law, the assets and programs of the original Society were preserved. The Hawaii State Chapter of the original Society has carried on the operations of the new American Judicature Society.

== Notable members ==
- Janet Reno, former Attorney General of the United States
- Gil Kerlikowske, Chief, Seattle Police Department
- Armand Brinkhaus, former member of both houses of the Louisiana State Legislature from St. Landry Parish
- Becky Cain, former president of the League of Women Voters
- William Ramsey Clark, 66th U. S. Attorney General
- Tom C. Clark, U. S. Attorney General (1945–1949), Associate Justice of the Supreme Court of the United States (1949–1967)
- Albert E. Jenner Jr., Chicago attorney
- A. Leo Levin, professor at the University of Pennsylvania Law School
- Henry Monsky, Omaha attorney
- Glenn Parker (1898–1989), former Chief Justice of the Wyoming Supreme Court
- William French Smith (74th Attorney General of the United States)
- Warren Austin, former U.S. Senator, Vermont, former U. S. Ambassador to the United Nations
- Thomas R. Phillips, former Chief Justice of the Texas Supreme Court
- David Ivar Swanson, Illinois state representative (1922–46 and 1948–50)
