= Becky Cain =

American women's rights activist

Rebecca "Becky" Cook Cain-Ceperley was the president of the League of Women Voters from 1992 to 1998. Cain is currently the president and CEO of The Greater Kanawha Valley Foundation in Charleston, West Virginia.

== Life ==
Cain is from St. Albans, West Virginia. She received a Bachelor of Arts in Political Science and International Relations from West Virginia University in 1969. While at West Virginia University, she was a member of Alpha Phi. In the summer of 1970, she did postgraduate work in Education at West Virginia University. She is married, and has one son.

== Career ==
Cain was originally a teacher to school-age children, and taught about American civics and the United States government. She joined the League of Women Voters in 1975, as a member of their Charleston, West Virginia chapter. She began to volunteer for the organization and advocated for the increased participation of women in American politics. She became the national president of the League of Women Voters in 1992, which was a volunteer position. As the national president of the League, she played an active role in seeking congressional action on a broad range of public policy issues including the fight for the passage of the National Voter Registration Act. She also sought to rebuild the faith of voters in the American political symptom, and combat voter apathy.

In 1996 the Ladies' Home Journal named her one of the most powerful women in politics in the category of issues and advocates. As president, she also helped to run advertisements in the Ladies' Home Journal that were aimed at increasing the political involvement of American women. Following her tenure at the League of Women Voters, she worked to achieve campaign finance reform in Congress as the president of Campaign for America. Cain has appeared on CBS This Morning, Primetime Live, the Larry King Show, and National Public Radio's All Things Considered. Scripps-Howard and Cox News Service have also carried her columns and guest editorials. She is currently a contributing columnist for The Charleston Gazette. In 2006, West Virginia Executive Magazine named her one of the 50 most powerful people in West Virginia.

Cain is a former member of the Executive Committee of the Leadership Conference on Civil Rights, the Advisory Committee on Election Law to the American Bar Association, and the West Virginia Election Commission. She is currently a member of the board of directors of the Campaign Finance Institute, the Alliance for Better Campaigns, the American Judicature Society, the West Virginia Center for Civic Life and the West Virginia Nature Conservancy. She also serves on the Committee on Legislation and Regulations for the Council on Foundations.

== Honors and awards ==
In 1988, she received the West Virginia Common Cause Public Service Award. That same year, she also received the West Virginia Celebrate Women Award for her commitment to, and achievement in, volunteer work. In 1992, she was honored with the West Virginia Education Association Corma A. Mowrey Memorial Award. She was named a distinguished alumnus of the West Virginia University Department of Political Science in 1994. In 1998, upon the end of her term as president of the League of Women Voters, the Becky Cain Award for Visionary Leadership was established by the organization in her honor. Cain has also received honorary Doctor of Law Degrees from Ripon College, University of Wisconsin–Madison and the University of Charleston, West Virginia.
