= Olof Krans =

American painter

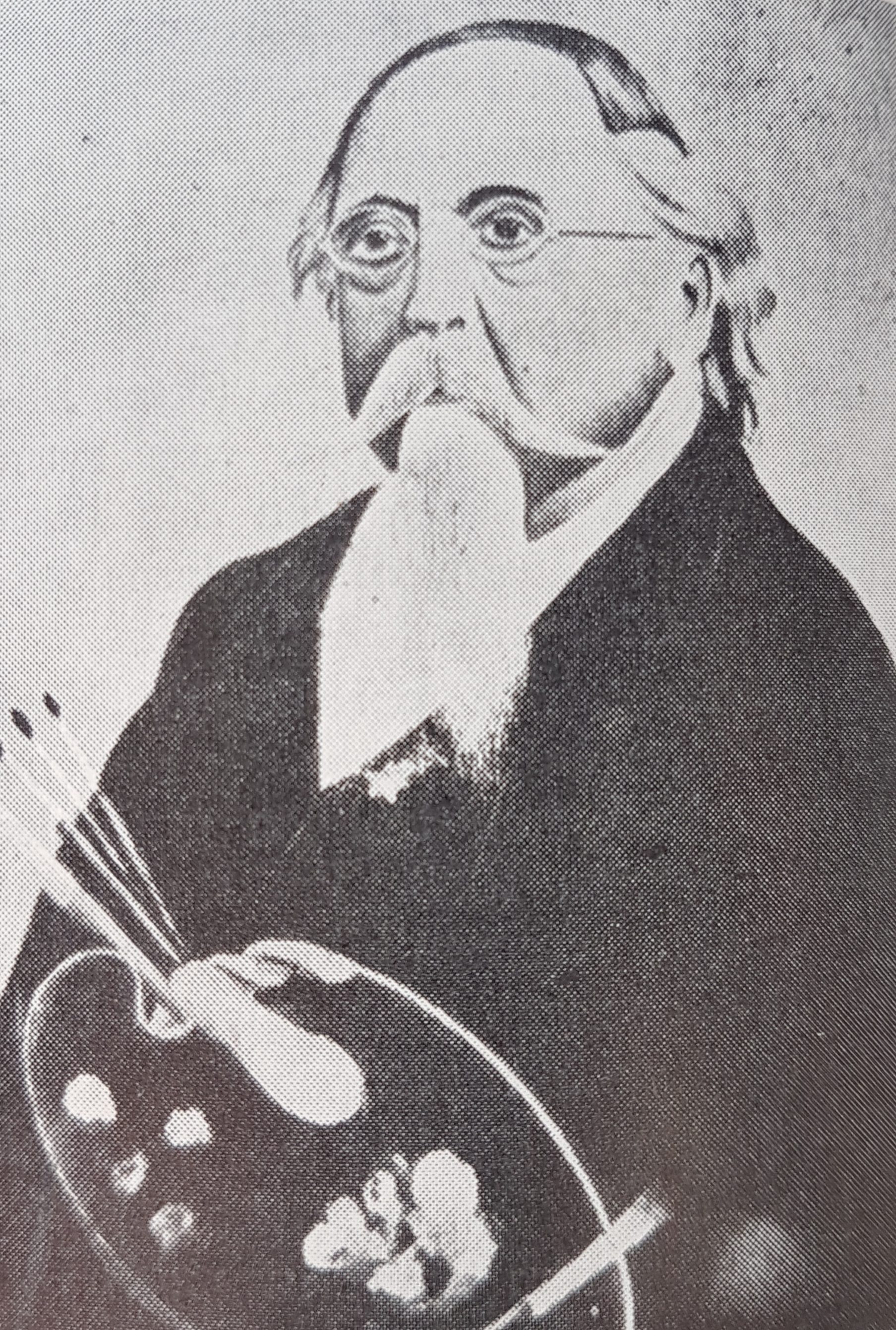
- Olof Krans self-portrait
- Born: Olof Ersson; November 2, 1838; Sälja in Tärnsjö Parish in northern Uppland, Sweden
- Died: January 4, 1916 (aged 77); Altona, Illinois
- Education: self-taught
- Known for: Painting
- Movement: Naïve art

Olof Krans (November 2, 1838 - January 4, 1916) was a Swedish-American folk artist. A self-taught artist, he painted in a style referred to as primitive or Naïve art.

== Background ==
Olof Ersson was born in a small hamlet of Sälja in Tärnsjö Parish in northern Uppland, Sweden. When Krans was twelve years old his family emigrated to the United States. The family arrived at the Bishop Hill Colony in Bishop Hill, Illinois during 1850. Bishop Hill was the site of a utopian religious community founded in 1846 by Swedish pietist Eric Jansson and his followers. During the first two winters at the colony, Krans attended school and as he got older he was an ox boy and later worked in the black smith and paint shops.

== Career ==
When the American Civil War started, the immigrants raised an entire company and Krans was among the volunteers. He mustered into the Union Army in Company D, 57th Illinois Volunteer Infantry Regiment. He changed his last name to Krans. The word krans can be translated to mean wreath or garland in the Swedish language. His whole family subsequently adopted the new name. After the Battle of Fort Donelson in Tennessee he was given a disability discharge on June 3, 1862.

After the war, Krans married in 1867 and relocated to Galva, Illinois. There he became a house painter and also did interior decorating, including the interior of Galva's Methodist and Lutheran Churches.

In 1896 while he was recovering from a fall, he began painting memories and people from his youth in the Bishop Hill Colony. In his paintings, Krans documented daily life at Bishop Hill. He began painting a series of pictures that described everyday life in the early days of the colony. On the 50th anniversary of the Bishop Hill Colony, Krans donated a large portions of his paintings to the colony. Olof Krans died in Altona, Illinois. At the time of his death he had finished more than 90 pictures.

== Memorials ==
Today most of his art belongs to the collection of the Olof Krans Museum at Bishop Hill which was dedicated in 1988 at a ceremony witnessed by Princess Christina of Sweden. Some of his paintings are also on display at the Tärnsjö Museum in Sweden, only a short distance from the house where he was born. Bishop Hill Museum at Biskopskulla Prästgård, is located outside Örsundsbro, east of Enköping in Uppland, Sweden. Additional pieces reside in the Chicago History Museum.

== Other sources ==
- Sparks, Esther (1972), Olof Krans, Prairie Painter, National Trust for Historic Preservation
- Merle H. Glick, "The World of Olof Krans", The Clarion, Fall 1982.
