= Bishop Hill State Historic Site =

Coordinates: 41.2003°N 90.1189°W

Bishop Hill State Historic Site is an open-air museum in Henry County, Illinois. It is located about 2 miles north of U.S. Route 34 in Bishop Hill, Illinois.

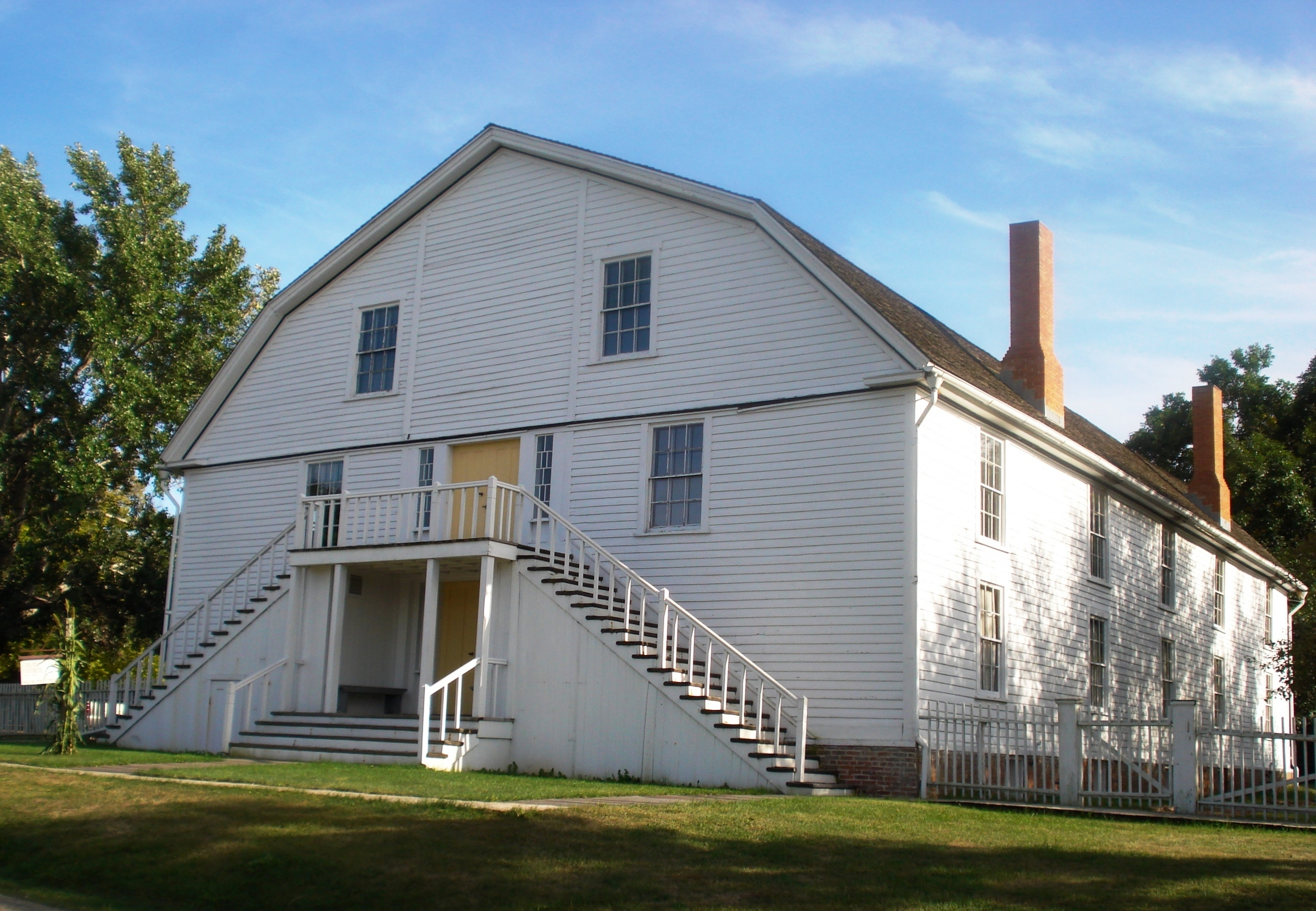
Colony Church built in 1848

The Illinois Historic Preservation Agency operates four surviving buildings in the village as a state historic site located within the Bishop Hill Historic District, which was added to the National Register of Historic Places in 1970, and listed as a National Historic Landmark in 1984.

Bishop Hill was the site of a utopian religious community founded in 1846 by Swedish pietist Eric Janson. The settlers of Bishop Hill included skilled carpenters and craftsmen. Today visitors can enter the two-story frame Greek Revival-style Colony Church (1848), part of which was once used as single-room apartments by colony residents and which features a museum about Bishop Hill's history and reproductions of Colony artifacts, the three-story stuccoed-brick Colony Hotel (1852-ca. 1860), the small two-story frame Boys Dormitory (ca. 1850), and the Colony barn (mid-1850s) which was relocated behind the Hotel to the site of the original Hotel stable. The state also owns the village park with a gazebo and memorials to the town’s early settlers and Civil War soldiers. A museum building houses a collection of early American primitive paintings by colonist and folk artist Olof Krans.

== Related reading ==
- Barton; H. Arnold (1994) A Folk Divided: Homeland Swedes and Swedish-Americans, 1840-1940 (Southern Illinois University Press) ISBN 978-0809319442
- Lovoll, Odd S. (1993) Nordics in America: The Future of Their Past (Norwegian American Historical Association) ISBN 978-0877328100
