= Arthur W. Oberbeck =

United States Army general (1912–1989)

- Born: 13 January 1912; Chicago, Illinois, U.S.
- Died: 7 September 1989 (aged 77)
- Burial place: Arlington National Cemetery
- Spouse: Margaret Lanigan
- Military career
- Branch: United States Army
- Service years: 1937-1972
- Rank: Lieutenant General
- Commands: 1st Infantry Division (United States); Defense Atomic Support Agency; Weapons Systems Evaluation Group; Armed Forces Special Weapons Project; 3rd Engineer Battalion (United States); Joint Chiefs of Staff
- Conflicts: World War II; Korean War; Vietnam War
- Awards: Army Distinguished Service Medal; World War II Victory Medal; Asiatic–Pacific Campaign Medal

Arthur William Oberbeck (13 January 1912 – 7 September 1989) was an American lawyer, energy consultant, and Lieutenant General who served during World War II, the Korean War, and the Vietnam War. A career officer commissioned in the United States Army Corps of Engineers, Oberbeck served multiple assignments in the then developing field of Nuclear Weapons, as the Commanding General of the 1st Infantry Division (United States), and within the Joint Chiefs of Staff.

After retiring from the Army in 1972, Oberbeck enrolled in the at the University of Texas at Austin and earned a Juris Doctor degree, graduating in 1975. He died in 1989 of cancer.

== Early life ==
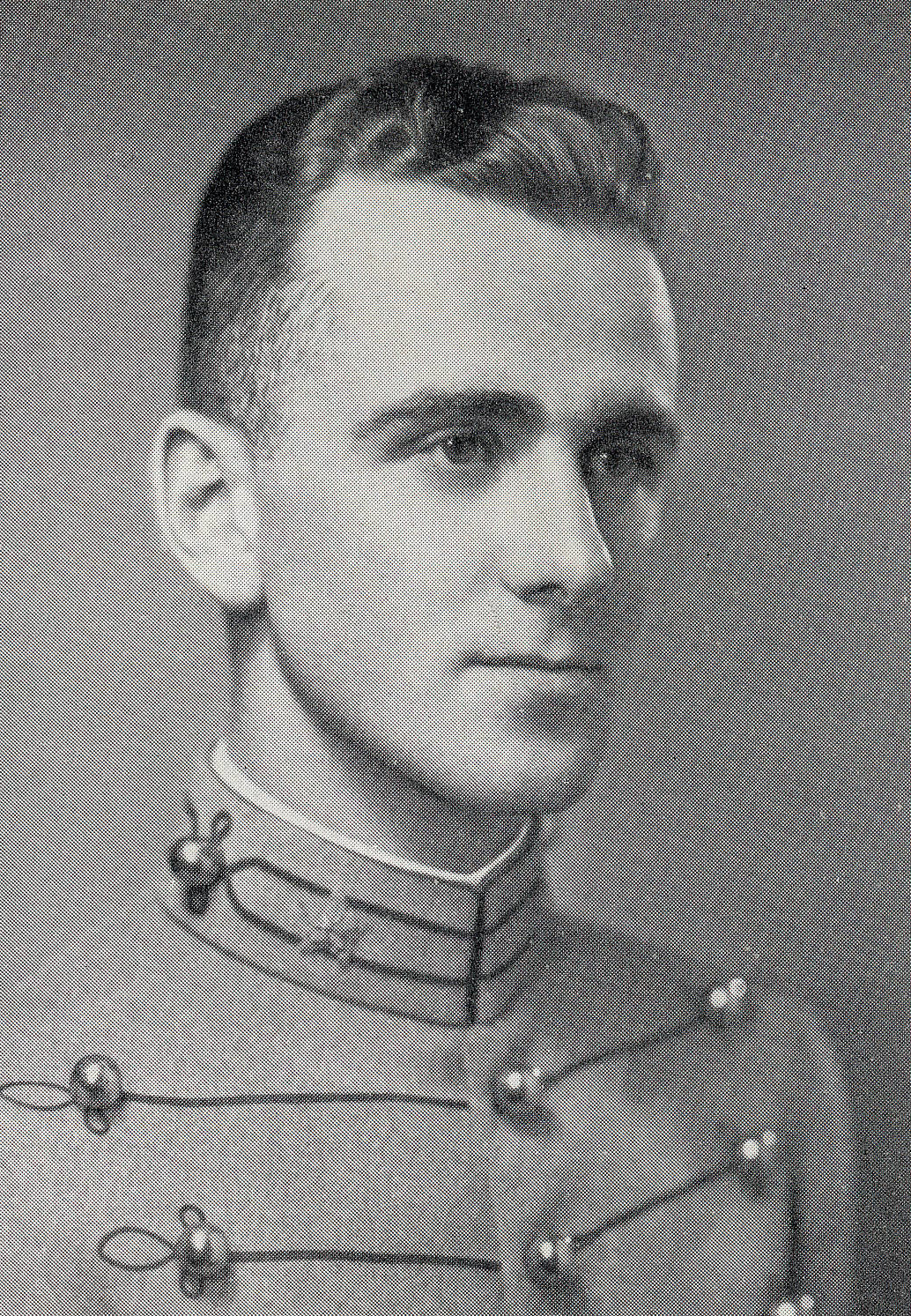
At West Point in 1937

Oberbeck was born in Chicago, IL on January 13, 1912. In 1933, He enrolled in the United States Military Academy at West Point, graduating in 1937 at the top of his class, and commissioning as a 2nd Lieutenant in the United States Army Corps of Engineers.

== Career ==
Oberbeck began his career after West Point in the 5th Engineer Regiment at Fort Belvoir, VA. He would then attend and study at University of California at Berkley and earn a Master of Science in Civil Engineering. In 1940, Oberbeck was assigned to 3rd Engineer Battalion (United States), where he would serve as the Battalion Commander and Division Engineer for the 24th Infantry Division. He would serve in these roles in the Pacific Theater of World War II until 1944, where he would be assigned to the Office of the Chief Engineer, under General MacArthur.

In 1945, after the war, Oberbeck began his first of many assignments related to nuclear energy and weapons, at the New York City office of the Atomic Energy Commission. In 1947 until 1951, he returned to West Point to serve as an instructor and assistant professor in mathematics. Following this, Oberbeck was assigned to the Armed Forces Special Weapons Project where he commanded two of the nations nuclear stockpile sites, and acted as the officer-in-charge of unit training for all four military branches.

In 1955, Oberbeck graduated from the United States Army War College, after which he continued to work within the field of nuclear energy and weapons on the Joint Chiefs of Staff. The following year, he was promoted to Brigadier General and assigned as the Director of the Special Weapons Development for the United States Continental Army Command. In 1963, he was promoted to Major General and took command of the 1st Infantry Division at Fort Riley, KS.

For the remainder of his career, from 1964 to 1972 he served in various commands and positions related to nuclear weaponry and military engineering. These include the Defense Atomic Support Agency, Joint Task Force Eight, as the commandant of the Engineer School, and as a senior Army member of the Weapons Systems Evaluation Group in Washington, D.C. In 1969, he was promoted to lieutenant general, a rank in which he would serve until his retirement in 1972.

== Retirement and death ==
Following Oberbeck's retirement, he enrolled in the at the University of Texas at Austin and earned a Juris Doctor degree, graduating in 1975. He continued work within the energy field, performing legal research in relation to geothermal energy. He briefly wrote articles for Geothermal Energy, a magazine issued by the Department of Defense. Until 1980, Oberbeck also worked as a consultant for the UT Center for Energy Studies. He died due to cancer in 1989.

== Personal life ==
Oberbeck married his wife Margaret Lanigan in September 1938. The couple had two sons.
