= Biskopskulla Church =

Coordinates: 59°43′55″N 17°11′51″E

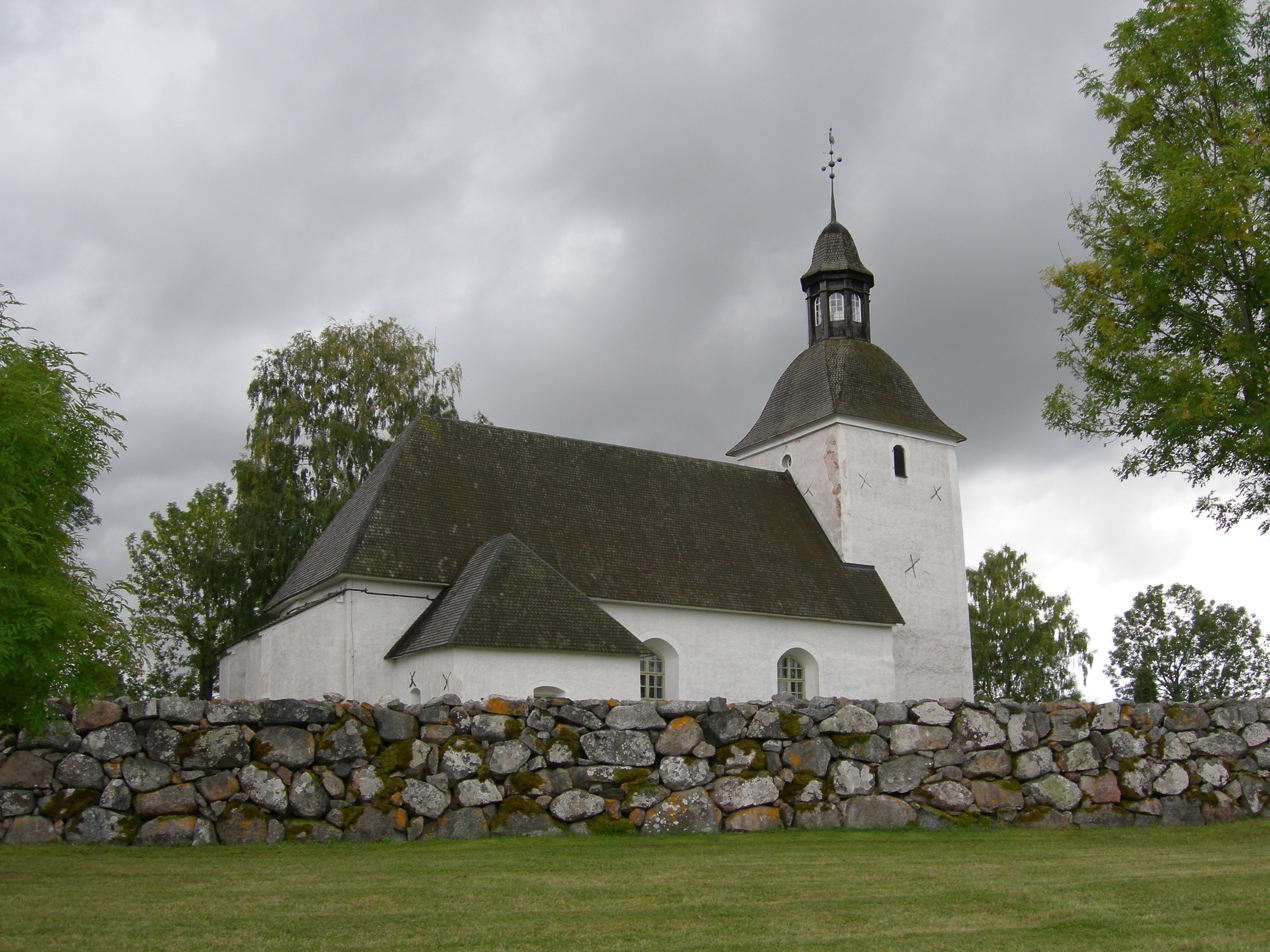
Biskopskulla Church, view of the exterior

Biskopskulla Church (Swedish: Biskopskulla kyrka) is a medieval church in the Archdiocese of Uppsala (Church of Sweden) in Uppsala County, Sweden.

== History and architecture ==
The church dates from the Middle Ages and was probably originally built in a Romanesque style (probably during the 12th century) but was heavily rebuilt already in medieval times and attained its present form in the 14th or 15th century. The vaults of the church are of a type that was common before the 15th century, indicating it may have been rebuilt during the 14th century. Its western tower is at heart Gothic but with later changes, i.e. the roof and spire with a lantern which dates from the 18th century.

Inside the church walls are decorated with murals in the style of the so-called Strängnäs School, which was particularly popular in neighbouring Södermanland. Biskopskulla Church is the northernmost church decorated with murals of this style. The paintings depict religious subjects. In the choir, there are representations of the Four Evangelists with their respective symbols and of the four doctors of the Church. In the nave, there are murals with Marian themes and a depiction of the Last Judgment. The richly decorated church porch contains depictions of the Wheel of Furtune and Saint George and the Dragon.

The church contains a medieval wooden triumphal cross and a baptismal font from the 13th century made of limestone from Gotland. Other furnishings are post-Reformation. These include the pulpit from 1686 (repainted and gilded in 1753), a former altarpiece from 1753, the organ from 1870, four iron chandeliers from the 18th century and a more recent baptismal font from 1965.

A renovation of the church was carried out in 1955.
