= Bishop's Hill Wood =

Protected area in Gloucestershire, England

Coordinates: 51.58392°N 2.38675°W

- Site of Special Scientific Interest
- Location of Bishop's Hill Wood.
- Area of search: Avon
- Grid reference: ST733873
- Interest: Biological
- Area: 30.6 hectares (76 acres)
- Notification date: 1984
- Location map: English Nature

Bishop's Hill Wood (grid reference ST733873) is a 30.6 hectares (76 acres) biological Site of Special Scientific Interest (SSSI) in England. It lies just to the east of the village of Wickwar, South Gloucestershire and was notified in 1984.
