= Eric Jansson =

Swedish Protestant leader (1808–1850)

- Born: 19 December 1808; Biskopskulla, Uppland, Sweden
- Died: 13 May 1850 (aged 41); Cambridge, Illinois, United States
- Other names: Erik Jansson, Janson
- Occupation: Leader of a Pietist sect

Eric or Erik Jansson or Janson (19 December 1808 – 13 May 1850) was the leader of a Swedish Radical Pietist sect that emigrated to the United States in 1846.

== Early and family life ==
Jansson was born in the village of Landsberga in the parish Biskopskulla in Uppland, near Uppsala, Sweden, the son of farmer Jan Mattsson and his wife Sarah Eriksdotter. He was a frail child, and became interested in reforming the state Lutheran Church of Sweden as an adolescent.

Believing that he was miraculously cured of rheumatism after experiencing a vision at age 22, Jansson became devoutly religious and began reading works of the German mystic Johann Arndt. Particularly, after another mystical experience while visiting the market at Uppsala ten years later, Jansson developed beliefs that conflicted with the state catechism.

== Swedish ministry and conflicts ==
By 1841, Jansson, though a layman, was preaching in the Västmanland province. Especially in Torstuna and Österunda parishes, his prayer meetings attracted considerable attention, including from the authorities. The Conventicle Act, which had been in force since 1726 to control the growing Pietist movements in the country, banned preaching other than in the Church of Sweden. Jansson claimed to be able to exorcise demons and, when contradicted, often managed to out-shout his opponents, although he still maintained good relations with the clergy, especially Rev. J. J. Risberg, an assistant minister in Östersund who sometimes preached alongside him.

Jansson's movement grew out of the läsare (Reader) movement, as he and many of his followers were initially Readers. However, Jansson came to break with the teachings of Luther and Arndt. By 1844, he claimed to be a true prophet speaking the word of God. Jansson wanted to create a "New Jerusalem" to await Christ's coming and the Millennium. He alienated Rev. Risberg and many others in the state church, who came to question his sanity. Local priest Anders Scherdin, writing about Janssonism several years later, stated, "Läseriet can certainly be seen to have laid the foundation and prepared the way for Eric Jansson's heresy. The läsare paid more attention to their own assemblies than they did to the church worship, and had more time to complain about their pastor than to seek his instruction."

Jansson believed in the supremacy of the Bible and his own revelations and, beginning in 1844, publicly burned the works of Luther and others and urged his followers to do likewise. This occurred on a lake shore near the town of Alfta in June 1844, near Söderala in October 1844, and in Stenbo and Forsa in December 1844. Authorities arrested him, but Jansson was released several times after his followers appealed to Sweden's King, who felt imprisonment inappropriate for religious beliefs. However, in 1845, Jansson's followers and opponents engaged in several violent confrontations in Västmanland and Hälsingland provinces. When Jansson voluntarily appeared at a court session at Delsbo in Gävleborg province to answer charges, he was returned to Gävle prison while investigations continued. A guard warned Jansson that a fellow prisoner was told he would be rewarded for killing Jansson, so he escaped disguised as a woman, and ultimately skied across the mountains to Christiania, Norway, where Jansson hid until January 1846.

== Emigration to America ==
After repeated brushes with the law in Sweden and having outraged the hierarchy of the Church of Sweden, Jansson sailed from Oslo, Norway to the United States in 1846 under an assumed name and condemning his homeland to eternal damnation. About 1,200 to 1,500 followers sailed him across the Atlantic Ocean, perhaps in part because of the poor European harvest that year. A trusted follower, Olof Olsson, had been sent ahead in mid-1845 to locate a suitable place to settle in the United States. Olsson had arrived in New York on the Neptunus on 16 December 1845. There he met a fellow Swede, Olof Gustaf Hedstrom, who suggested that Olsson contact his brother, Jonas Hedström, who was living in Victoria, Knox County, Illinois near the Mississippi River. Other followers were not so lucky. Several vessels foundered during the cross-Atlantic voyage, drowning hundreds of Janssonists. Many others died from cholera during the trip or soon after they arrived.

Jansson arrived in New York in June 1846 and, with the help of 400 of his followers who had survived the journey, founded the Bishop Hill Colony in Henry County, Illinois (adjacent to Knox County). He named the colony after his Swedish birthplace. Although 96 immigrants died during the first winter, housed in two separate dugouts or "mud caves" in ravines separated by gender, others continued to arrive from Sweden. Residents began their daily worship after Jansson rang a bell around 5:00 a.m. and diligently studied English to proselytize their neighbors, as well as ground bushels of corn to boil for basic survival. When some tried to escape, Jansson posted guards.

Villagers lived as a collective religious colony for 15 years from 1846 to 1861, tilling the soil, tending their animals, and building their settlement with handmade bricks. A large number of Shakers from Pleasant Hill, Kentucky joined the community, as did thirty converts from Hopedale, Massachusetts. When a fifth group of more than four hundred immigrants from Sweden arrived in 1847, the commune's population reached 700, but the subsequent severe winter led to food shortages and illness and about 200 people left to join a nearby Methodist community, using personal wealth they had hidden in order to buy land. Some local pioneers were amazed by their lifestyle and the relative success that it generated, since after 1847 the community grew both cash crops and food for themselves, as well as manufactured carpet for sale (production would peak in 1857 at 150,000 yards before the new Chicago, Burlington & Quincy Railroad would bring cheaper manufactured goods from Chicago and the east). Although Jansson had ordered celibacy during the lean years, in 1848, the year the community built the (still-standing) Colony Church, Jansson lifted the ban and conducted mass marriage ceremonies, arranging the marriages 83 of 102 couples married between 1848 and 1853.

But the idyllic life in rural Illinois was not to last. Jansson's own wife, Maja Stina, died in a cholera outbreak which killed about 150 colonists. While Jansson remarried in September 1849, the doctor that the group brought from Nauvoo, Illinois to deal with the earlier outbreak proved both incompetent and expensive. Dr. Robert Foster foreclosed on some of Jansson's promissory notes so that 30 pairs of communal oxen, 94 calves, and other communal livestock and possessions were auctioned off in 1849. In 1850, Jansson sent nine of his followers to California, hoping that they would prospect successfully during the California Gold Rush and that this additional wealth would help support their community. Although nearly bankrupted by Dr. Foster and despite the desertions, the colony of 100 men, 250 women, and 200 children owned 4000 acres of land, a church, grist and flour mills, three dwelling houses, and five other buildings.

== Murder ==
Three Swedish immigrant men had arrived from New Orleans in late 1848. While two soon left, a man named John Root remained in the colony and in November 1849 married Jansson's cousin and ward, Charlotta Louisa Root (known as "Lotta"). Soon thereafter, Root become disaffected with the commune and wanted to leave Bishop Hill, but the other colonists prevented him from taking his family along. Moreover, Jansson had inserted a phrase in the marriage contract which specifically allowed Lotta the choice whether to leave, and she refused to accompany Root. On March 2, 1850, Root and another man kidnapped Lotta and her newborn son, but twelve Janssonists pursued them and brought Lotta back. Root then turned to the courts, and again kidnapped her as she arrived at the local Henry County courthouse in Cambridge, Illinois as a witness and took her to Chicago. Her sister Caroline got word that Lotta and the baby were at her house to Jansson, and their brother Jan rescued the mother and baby and brought them back to Bishop Hill voluntarily. Root tried another kidnapping on March 26, 1850, this time recruiting some brother Masons from Cambridge as assistants, but they left Bishop Hill empty-handed because Jansson hid Lotta and the baby, and ultimately fled with them across the Mississippi River to St. Louis, where he took a job as a flour salesman.

On May 12, 1850, followers listened to Jansson preach a sermon about a scriptural phrase in which Jesus prophesied about soon drinking in his Father's kingdom. The next day, May 13, 1850, while Jansson chatted with the Henry County Clerk at the Cambridge courthouse, Root ran up the stairs and into the courtroom, then shot and killed Jansson. Although some followers expected Jansson to rise on the third day, he did not, and the colony reconciled itself to his death.

Root was charged and convicted of manslaughter, but was released after serving just one year in prison before securing a pardon, but died soon thereafter.

== Legacy ==
Illinois' legislature issued a charter to Bishop Hill on January 17, 1853, and Jansson's longtime friend and follower Jonas Olson returned from California and came to lead the community, along with six other trustees. The village continued and prospered for several years, but suffered in the 1857 financial crisis. Community members learned that Olson had secretly speculated in now-worthless railroad and bank stock, which caused the community to split into two factions. Although Olson ordered celibacy and expelled those who disobeyed his order, in 1858 the community's men voted dissolve Bishop Hill.

The dissolution, with members receiving personal shares of community assets, took place by 1862, after the American Civil War broke out, although court cases dealing with accusations of mismanagement and division of the colony's property were not resolved until 1879. Both male and female members each received about 22 acres of farmland, as well as a timber lot and a farm lot. Although most stayed in the area, some moved to nearby Galva, Illinois (named for the seaport from which many had left Sweden) because it was on a railroad line that the Swedish community had been contracted to help build. By 1870, only 200 Janssonists lived at Bishop Hill, although at its peak the community had about 1,000 members. Most former members joined the local Methodist church, although some joined the Pleasant Hill Shakers and some the Seventh-day Adventists.

The village is now Bishop Hill Historic District. In 1984, the surviving buildings were listed on the National Register of Historic Places. The Illinois Historic Preservation Agency owns and operates the Bishop Hill State Historic Site including the Visitor Center, Colony Church, and Colony Hotel, as well as the park containing the original dugouts as an open-air museum. A brick museum houses a valuable collection of folk art paintings by colonist Olof Krans (1838–1916).

While there had been several Swedish immigrant colonies earlier in American history, notably the short-lived colony at New Sweden in Delaware and an ongoing community in Philadelphia, Pennsylvania, the Janssonist emigrants triggered a larger wave of Swedish immigration in the latter half of the 19th century. Letters home from Janssonists to their friends and family, telling of the fertile agricultural land in the interior of North America, stimulated substantial migration for several decades and the formation of a distinct Swedish-American ethnic community of the American Midwest including areas around Galesburg, Illinois as well as in Minnesota to the northwest.

The transformation of the Bishop Hill Colony from religious sect in Sweden, to fledgling outpost, to prosperous economic engine, and finally to Swedish-American community, marks a unique pattern of Americanization and assimilation. Swanson (1998) has argued that this transformation and Americanization resulted from the degree of interaction between the colonists and the local citizens of Henry County: the colony was not insular, as the many documents held in archives of Bishop Hill demonstrate. The Bishop Hill Colony makes a useful contrast to the Mormons at Nauvoo, Illinois and the Amanas in Iowa, both rough contemporaries to Bishop Hill.

== Descendants ==
Direct descendants of Erik Jansson still lived in the colony of Bishop Hill until December 20, 2005 when Jansson's great-great grandson and Bishop Hill volunteer fireman Theodore Arthur Myhre Sr. died while on a fire service call. Other known descendants remain elsewhere in Nevada, Alabama, California, Illinois, Iowa, Minnesota, and Texas. The pietist practices of Bishop Hill's founding father did not make a lasting impact on Erik's descendants nor remain in the practical lives of his followers.

One of his descendants, Tanya Edgil of Hamilton, Alabama, participated in the Swedish reality TV show Allt för Sverige in 2018.

== See also ==
- Skevikarna – Swedish Radical Pietist separatist community
- Shouter movement – contemporaneous Swedish revival movement
