= Bishop Hill, Illinois =

Bishop Hill
- Village
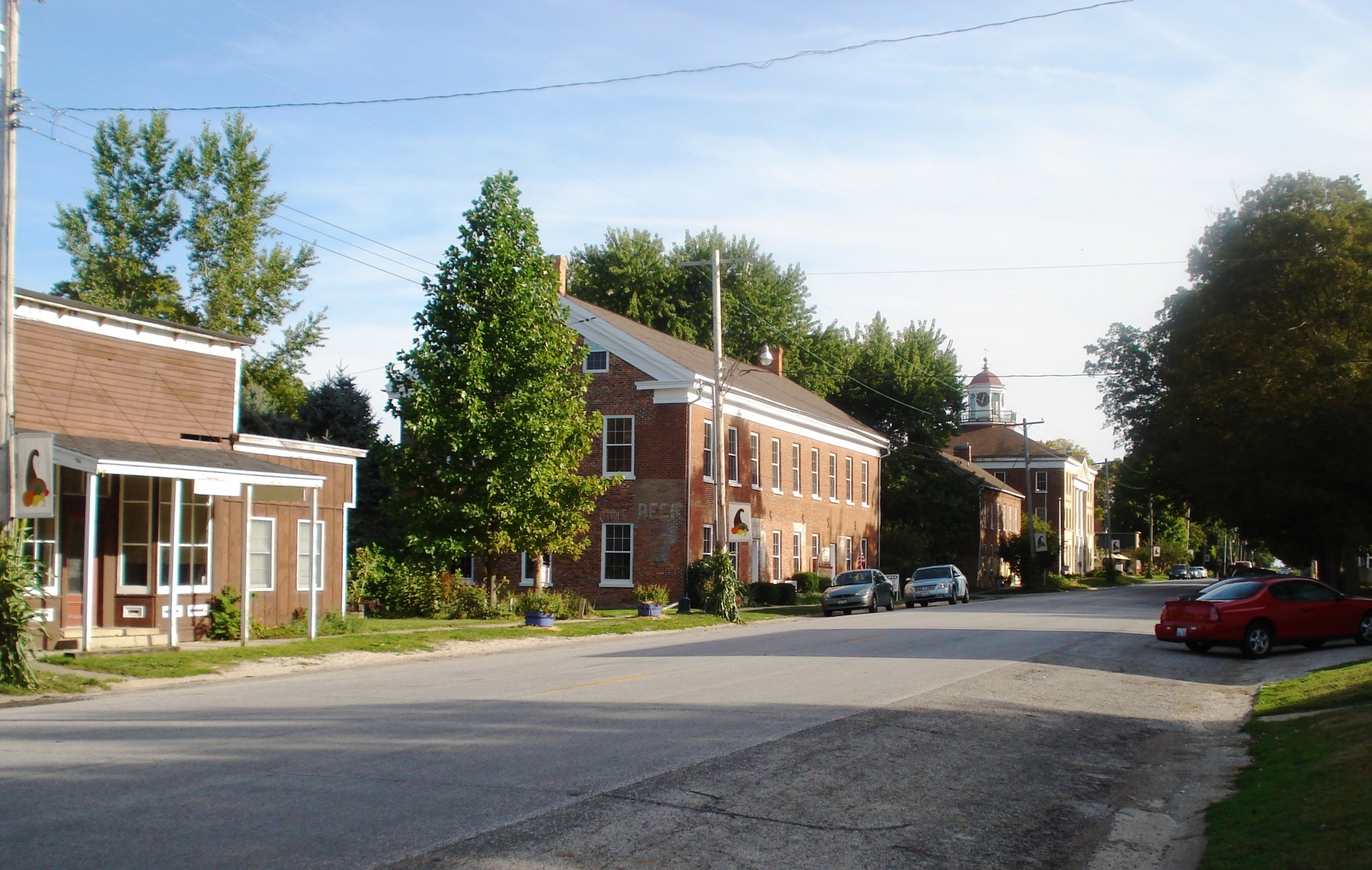
- Bishop Hill Street

- Location of Bishop Hill in Henry County, Illinois.
- Coordinates: 41°11′59″N 90°07′03″W
- Country: United States
- State: Illinois
- County: Henry

Area
  - Total: 0.53 sq mi (1.38 km^{2})
  - Land: 0.53 sq mi (1.38 km^{2})
  - Water: 0 sq mi (0.00 km^{2})
- Elevation: 791 ft (241 m)

Population (2020)
  - Total: 113
  - Density: 212.5/sq mi (82.03/km^{2})
- Time zone: UTC-6 (CST)
  - Summer (DST): UTC-5 (CDT)
- ZIP code: 61419
- Area code: 309
- FIPS code: 17-06171
- GNIS feature ID: 2398127
- Website: www.bishophillil.gov

Bishop Hill is a village in Henry County, Illinois, United States, along the South Edwards River. The population was 113 at the 2020 census. It is the home of the Bishop Hill State Historic Site, a park operated by the Illinois Historic Preservation Agency.

== History ==
=== Eric Jansson ===
The village was founded in 1846 by Swedish immigrants affiliated with the Pietist movement, led by Eric Jansson. Prior to founding the Bishop Hill Colony, Jansson preached to his followers in Sweden about what he considered to be the abominations of the Lutheran Church and emphasized the doctrine that the faithful were without sin. As Jansson's ideas became more radical, he began to lose support from many of his sympathizers and was forced to leave Sweden in the midst of growing persecution. Jansson had previously sent Olof Olsson, a trusted follower, as an emissary to the United States to find a suitable location where the Janssonists could set up a utopian community centered on their religious beliefs. According to Jansson, this community would become the "New Jerusalem", and their beliefs would soon spread across the world. As a result, 1400 colonists emigrated from Sweden to their new home in western Illinois.

The colony struggled early on after its founding. Many of the first 1000 colonists died from disease on the way to Bishop Hill (named for Eric Jansson's birthplace, Biskopskulla), while others became disillusioned and stayed in New York. The quarters in Bishop Hill were cold and crowded and food was scarce. After the first winter, life at the colony began to improve. In the next few years housing was upgraded from dugouts to brick living areas, and crops were planted on 700 acres (2.8 km^{2}) of land. By 1849, Bishop Hill had constructed a flour mill, two sawmills, a three-story frame church, and various other buildings. The Bishop Hill colony was communistic in nature, as dictated by Jansson. Thus, everything was owned by everyone and no one had more possessions than another. Work in the colony was highly rigorous and regimented. It wasn't uncommon to see hundreds of people working together in the fields or large groups of laborers engaged in other tasks.

=== After Jansson and today ===
The Bishop Hill colony underwent a major upheaval in 1850 after the murder of Eric Jansson. Jansson was assassinated by a former colony member, John Root, who was upset with Jansson for interfering with his marriage to one of Jansson's cousins. After their leader's death, the people of Bishop Hill appointed a group of seven trustees to run the affairs of the colony. Among the trustees were Jonas Olsson and Olof Johnson, who would become the primary leaders of the colony as they had been two of Jansson's closest aides. Under these two men and the rest of the trustees, the colony continued to grow and flourish. The workforce was reorganized to become more efficient and more buildings were erected. However, despite Bishop Hill's success, in 1857 financial problems arose in the midst of accusations of mismanagement against Olof Johnson. Johnson had made several large investments, without colony approval, that had turned out to be disastrous. As Bishop Hill headed for financial ruin, colonists voted to end the communal system. In 1861 the formal dissolution of the colony was official, and many of its people would soon be forced to move away.

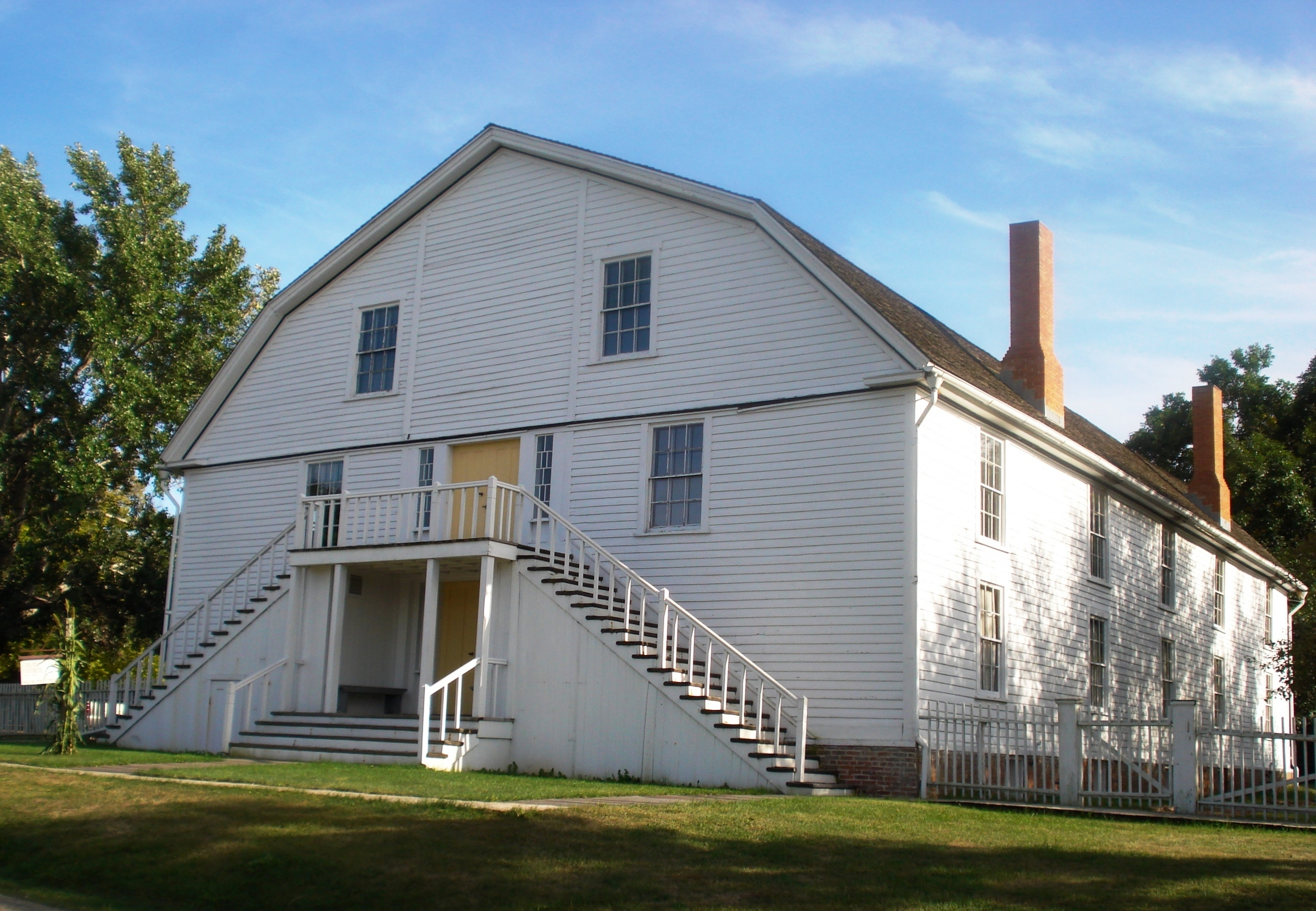
Colony Church built in 1848.

The Janssonist emigrants were a significant group of men and women to move from Sweden to the United States. Letters home from Janssonists to their friends and family, telling of the fertile agricultural land in the interior of North America, stimulated substantial migration for several decades and contributed to the formation of the Swedish-American ethnic community of the American Midwest.

Descendants of Eric Jansson still lived in the colony until December 20, 2004, when Eric's great-great-grandson and Bishop Hill volunteer fireman Theodore Arthur Myhre Sr. died south of the Colony while on a fire service call. Other known descendants remain in Illinois.

Surviving buildings built by the Janssonists are listed on the National Register of Historic Places. Bishop Hill is interpreted as a living community of Swedish-American heritage. Due to state budget cuts the Bishop Hill State Historic Site was closed for nearly 5 months from December 1, 2008, to April 23, 2009.

== Geography ==
According to the 2021 census gazetteer files, Bishop Hill has a total area of 0.53 square miles (1.37 km^{2}), all land.

== Demographics ==
Historical population
Census	Pop.	Note	%±
1880	350		—
1890	330		−5.7%
1900	345		4.5%
1910	289		−16.2%
1920	274		−5.2%
1930	208		−24.1%
1940	199		−4.3%
1950	202		1.5%
1960	164		−18.8%
1970	191		16.5%
1980	166		−13.1%
1990	131		−21.1%
2000	125		−4.6%
2010	128		2.4%
2020	113		−11.7%
U.S. Decennial Census

As of the 2020 census there were 113 people, 53 households, and 29 families residing in the village. The population density was 212.41 inhabitants per square mile (82.01/km^{2}). There were 68 housing units at an average density of 127.82 per square mile (49.35/km^{2}). The racial makeup of the village was 97.35% White, 0.00% African American, 0.00% Native American, 0.00% Asian, 0.00% Pacific Islander, 0.00% from other races, and 2.65% from two or more races. Hispanic or Latino of any race were 0.00% of the population.

There were 53 households, out of which 7.5% had children under the age of 18 living with them, 43.40% were married couples living together, 11.32% had a female householder with no husband present, and 45.28% were non-families. 41.51% of all households were made up of individuals, and 24.53% had someone living alone who was 65 years of age or older. The average household size was 2.24 and the average family size was 1.74.

The village's age distribution consisted of 7.6% under the age of 18, 0.0% from 18 to 24, 21.7% from 25 to 44, 35.9% from 45 to 64, and 34.8% who were 65 years of age or older. The median age was 62.4 years. For every 100 females, there were 48.4 males. For every 100 females age 18 and over, there were 44.1 males.

The median income for a family was $59,688. Males had a median income of $55,000 versus $17,250 for females. The per capita income for the village was $31,139. No families and 7.6% of the population were below the poverty line, including none of those under age 18 and 6.3% of those age 65 or over.

== Education ==
It is in the Galva Community Unit School District 224.

== Notable people ==
- Hick Cady, catcher for the Boston Red Sox and Philadelphia Phillies
- Roy Magnuson, composer and professor of music at Illinois State University
