= Bishop Hill Colony =

Coordinates: 41.2003°N 90.1189°W

- Bishop Hill Historic District
- U.S. National Register of Historic Places
- U.S. National Historic Landmark District
- Illinois State Historic Site
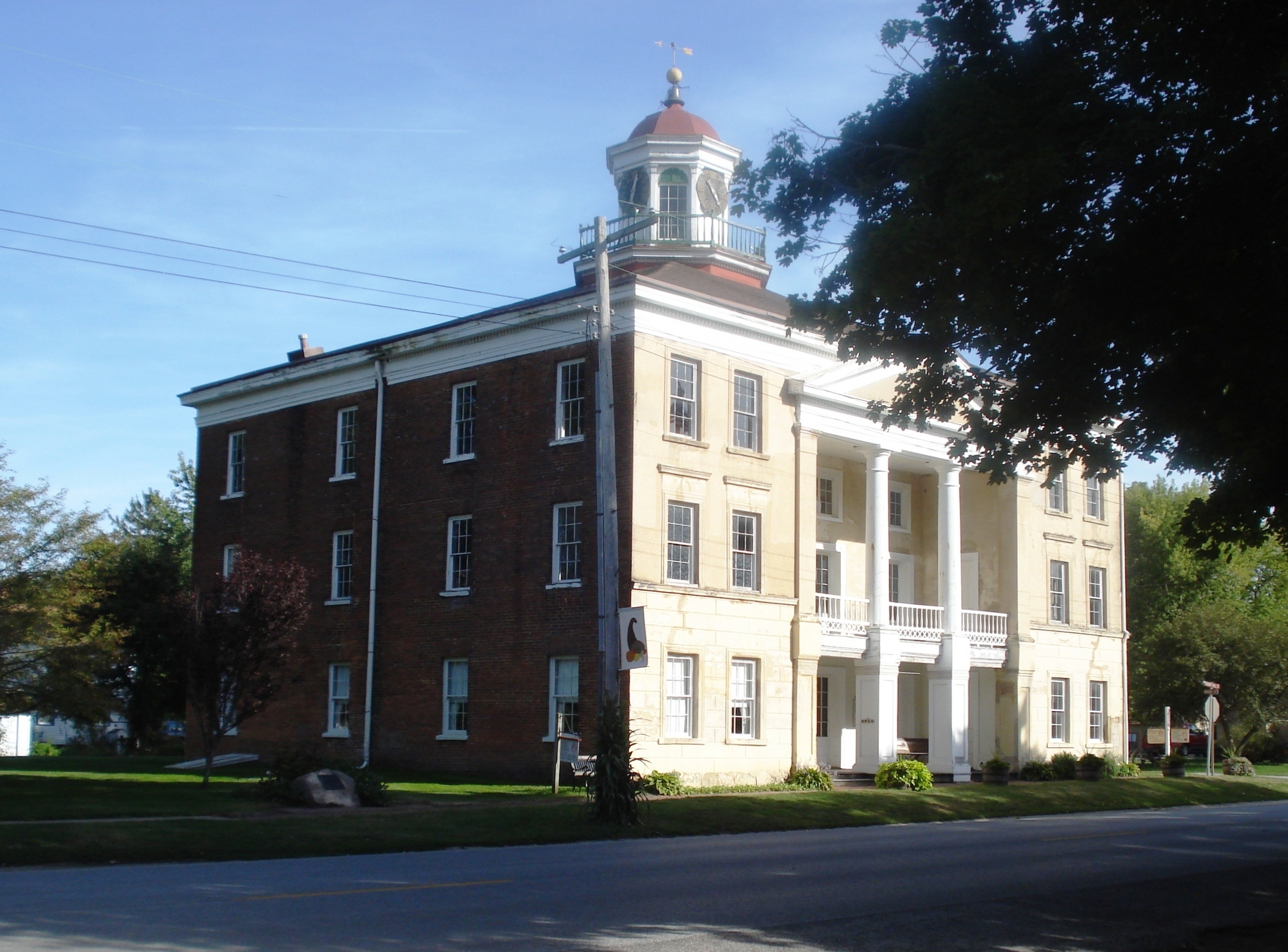
- Steeple Building

- Location within Illinois Location within the United States
- Location: Bishop Hill, Illinois
- Built: 1846
- Architect: Multiple
- Architectural style: Greek Revival
- NRHP reference No.: 70000244

Significant dates
- Added to NRHP: April 17, 1970
- Designated NHLD: April 27, 1984

Bishop Hill Colony is a historic district in Bishop Hill, Illinois. Bishop Hill was the site of a utopian religious community which operated as a commune. It was founded in 1846 by Swedish pietist Eric Janson and his followers. The community was named Bishop Hill after the parish of Biskopskulla in Uppland, Sweden.

== History ==
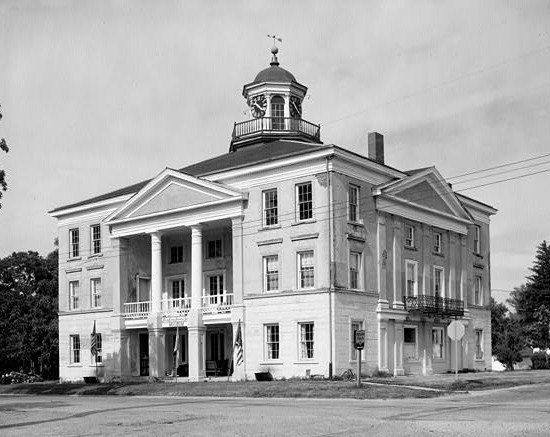
Steeple Building. Photo taken June 1976.

Founded in 1846 by religious dissidents who emigrated from Sweden to establish a new way of life on the Illinois prairie, the colony was run as a commune until its dissolution in 1861. The Bishop Hill Colony was the landmark Swedish settlement in Western Illinois leading the large Swedish-American communities in Galesburg, Rock Island, and Chicago. Its archives, artifacts, and structures today are important documents for the study of immigration, ethnic heritage, and 19th century communitarian societies."

A number of historically significant buildings have survived and are scattered throughout the village, four of which are owned by the state of Illinois and managed as part of the Bishop Hill State Historic Site. In addition to the historic structures, the state owns the village park with a gazebo and memorials to the town’s early settlers and Civil War soldiers. A brick museum building houses a valuable collection of folk art paintings by colonist Olof Krans. The site was declared a National Historic Landmark in 1984.

In celebration of the 2018 Illinois Bicentennial, Bishop Hill Colony was selected as one of the Illinois 200 Great Places by the American Institute of Architects Illinois component (AIA Illinois).

=== Erik Janson ===
The village was founded led by Erik Janson. Prior to founding the Bishop Hill Colony, Jansson preached to his followers in Sweden about what he considered to be the abominations of the Lutheran Church and emphasized the doctrine that the faithful were without sin. As Jansson's ideas became more radical, he began to lose support from many of his sympathizers and was forced to leave Sweden in the midst of growing persecution. Jansson had previously sent Olof Olsson, a trusted follower, as an emissary to the United States to find a suitable location where the Janssonists could set up a utopian community centered around their religious beliefs. According to Jansson, this community would become the "New Jerusalem", and their beliefs would soon spread across the world. As a result, 1400 colonists emigrated from Sweden to their new home in western Illinois.

The colony struggled early on after its founding. Many of the first 1000 colonists died from disease on the way to Bishop Hill (named for Eric Jansson's birthplace, Biskopskulla), while others became disillusioned and stayed in New York. The quarters in Bishop Hill were cold and crowded and food was scarce. After the first winter, life at the colony began to improve. In the next few years housing was upgraded from dugouts to brick living areas, and crops were planted on 700 acres (2.8 km^{2}) of land. By 1849, Bishop Hill had constructed a flour mill, two sawmills, a three-story frame church, and various other buildings. The Bishop Hill Colony was communistic in nature, as dictated by Jansson. Thus, everything was owned by everyone and no one had more possessions than another. Work in the colony was highly rigorous and regimented. It was not uncommon to see hundreds of people working together in the fields or large groups of laborers engaged in other tasks.

== Photo gallery ==
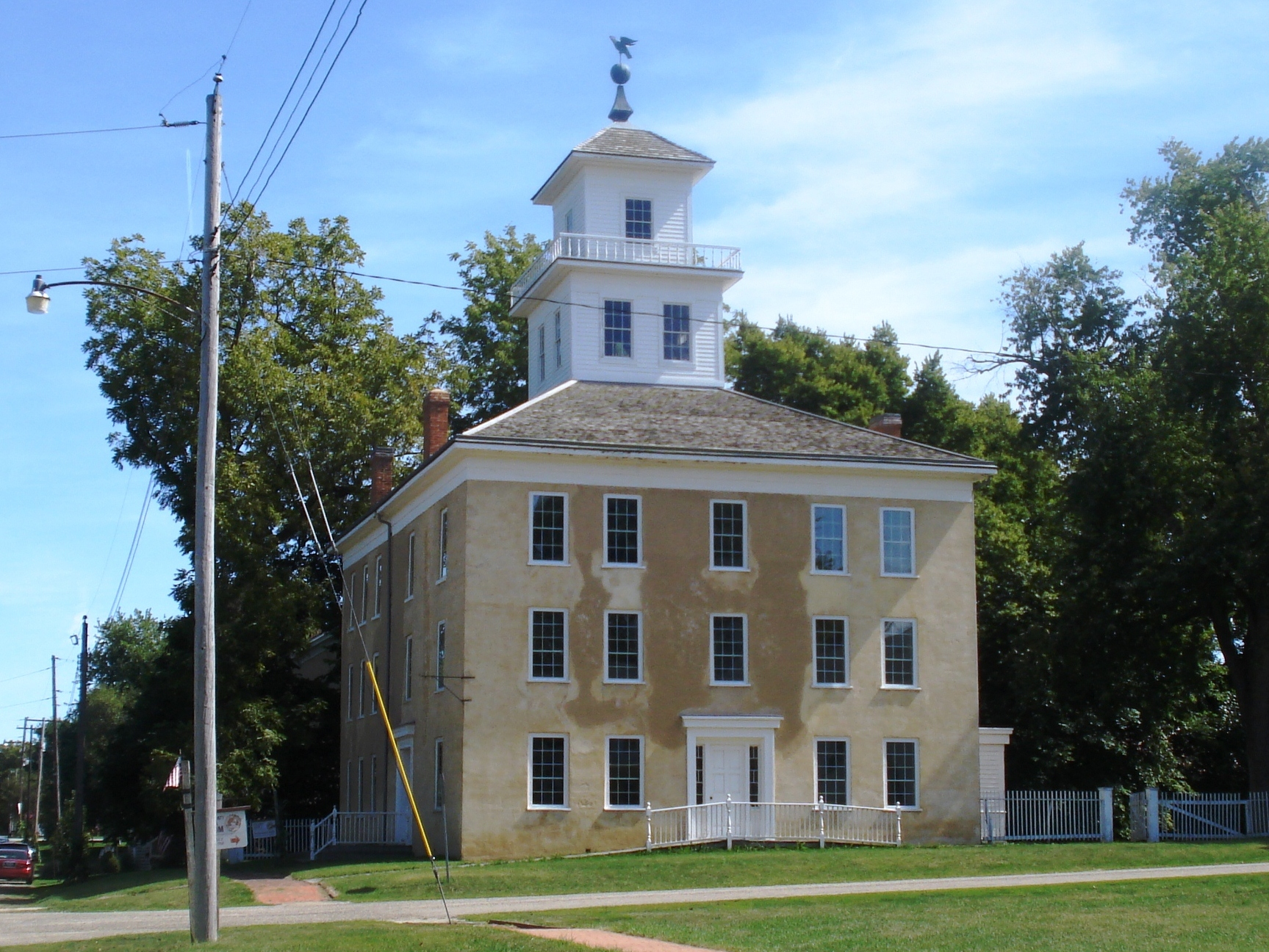
Colony Hotel

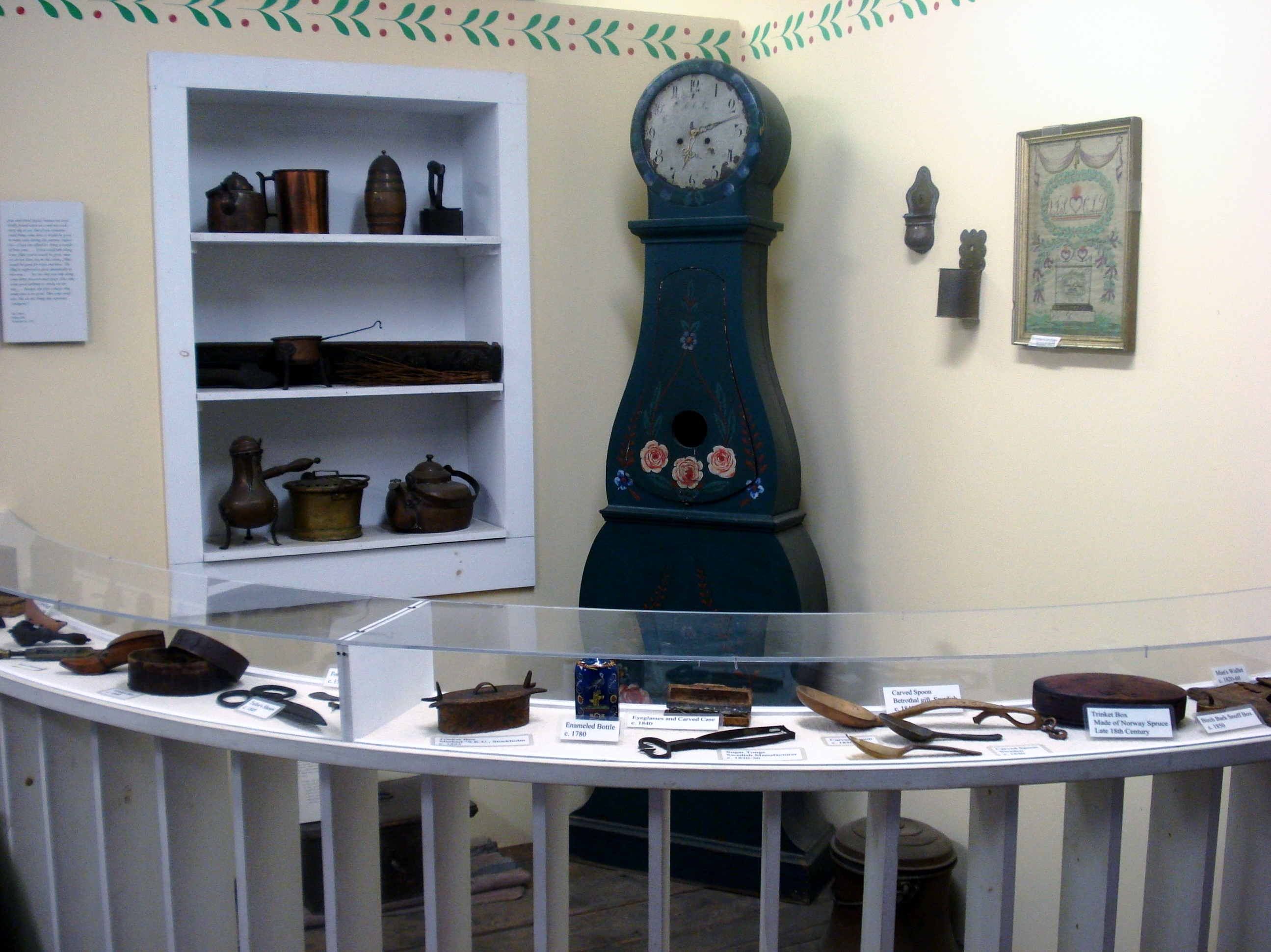
Exhibit at Bishop Hill Heritage Association Museum

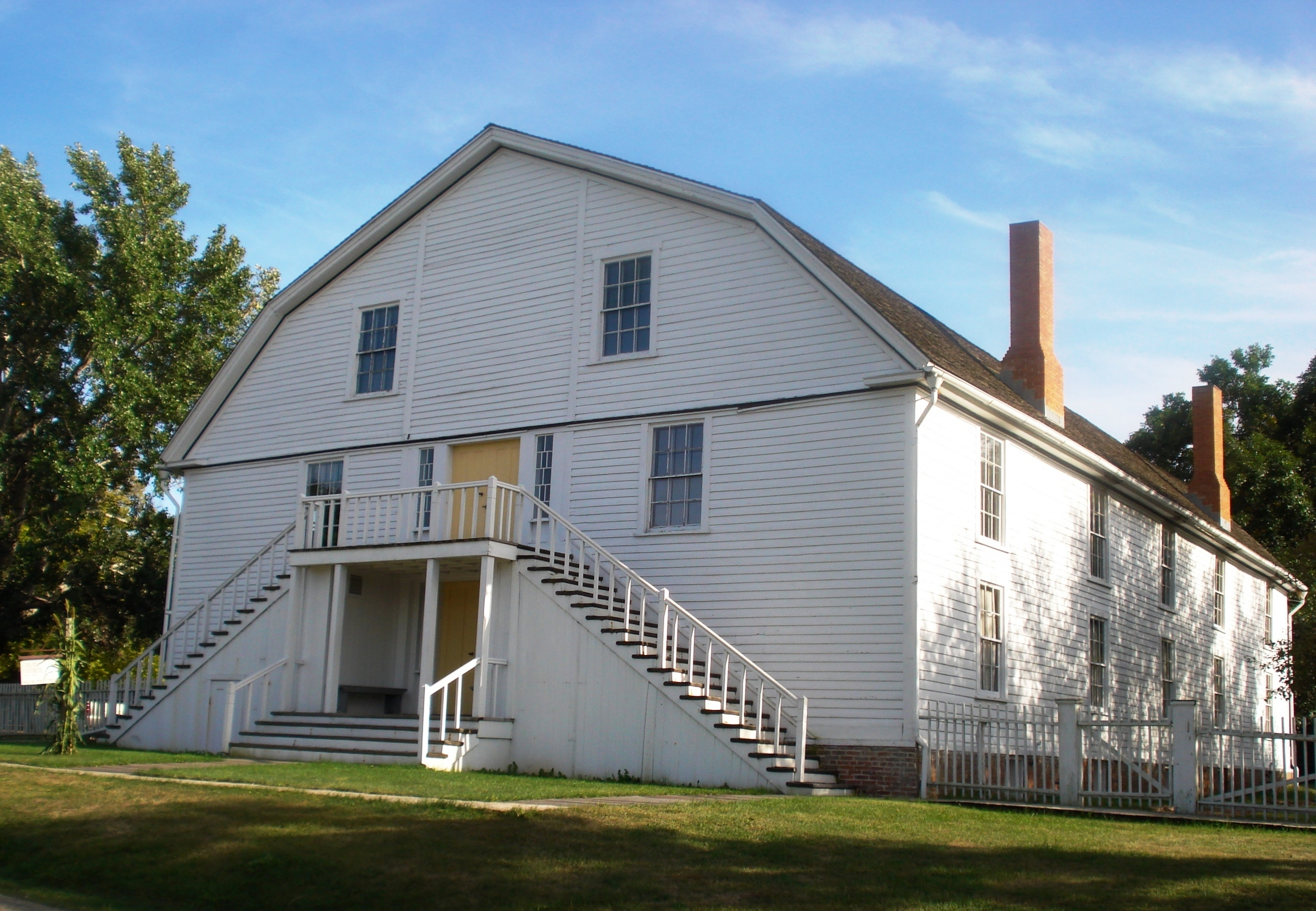
Colony Church built in 1848

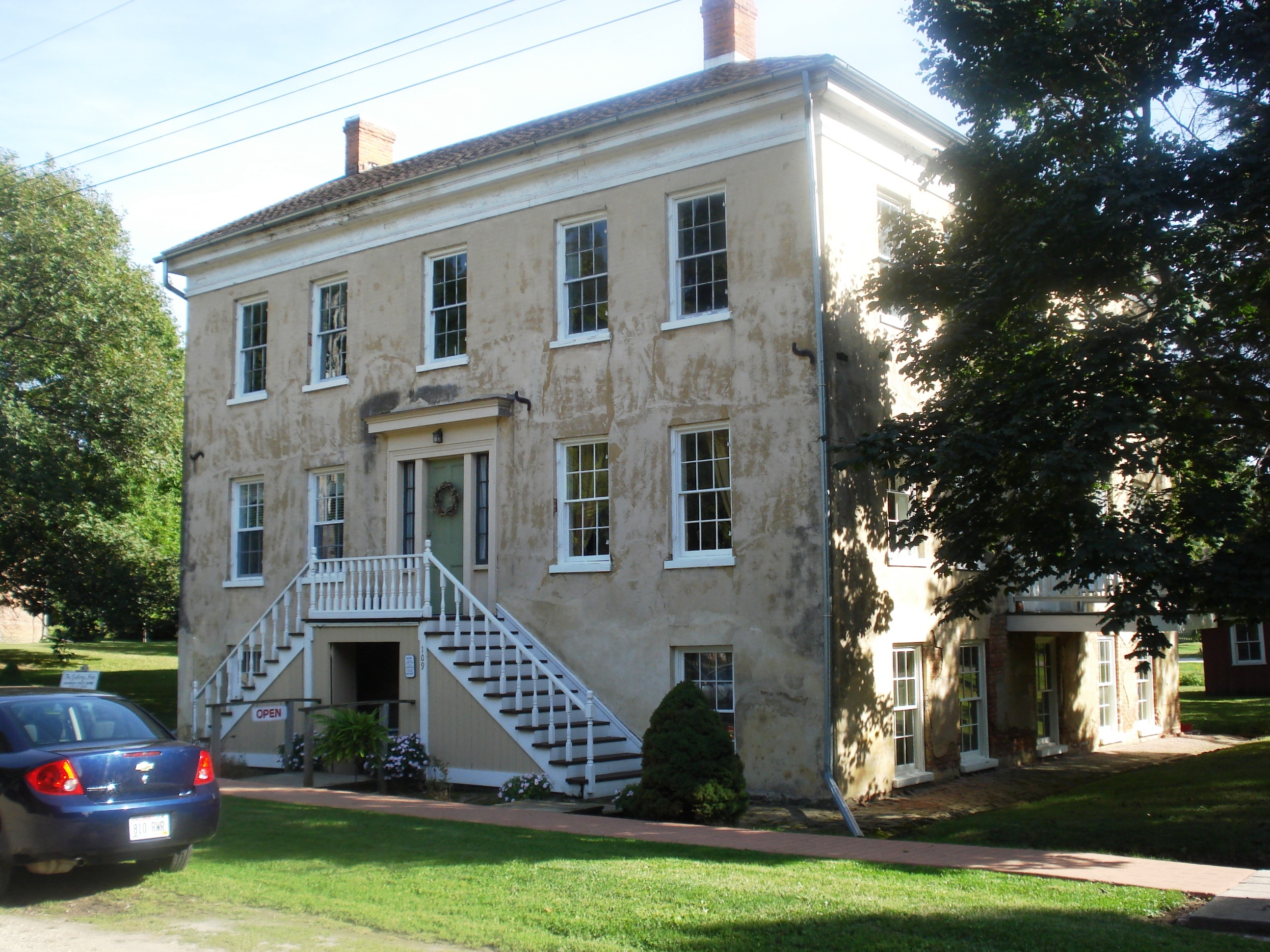
Apartment Building built in 1855
