= Quad Cities =

Quad Cities, Iowa–Illinois Davenport–Moline–Rock Island, IA–IL
- Metropolitan Statistical Area
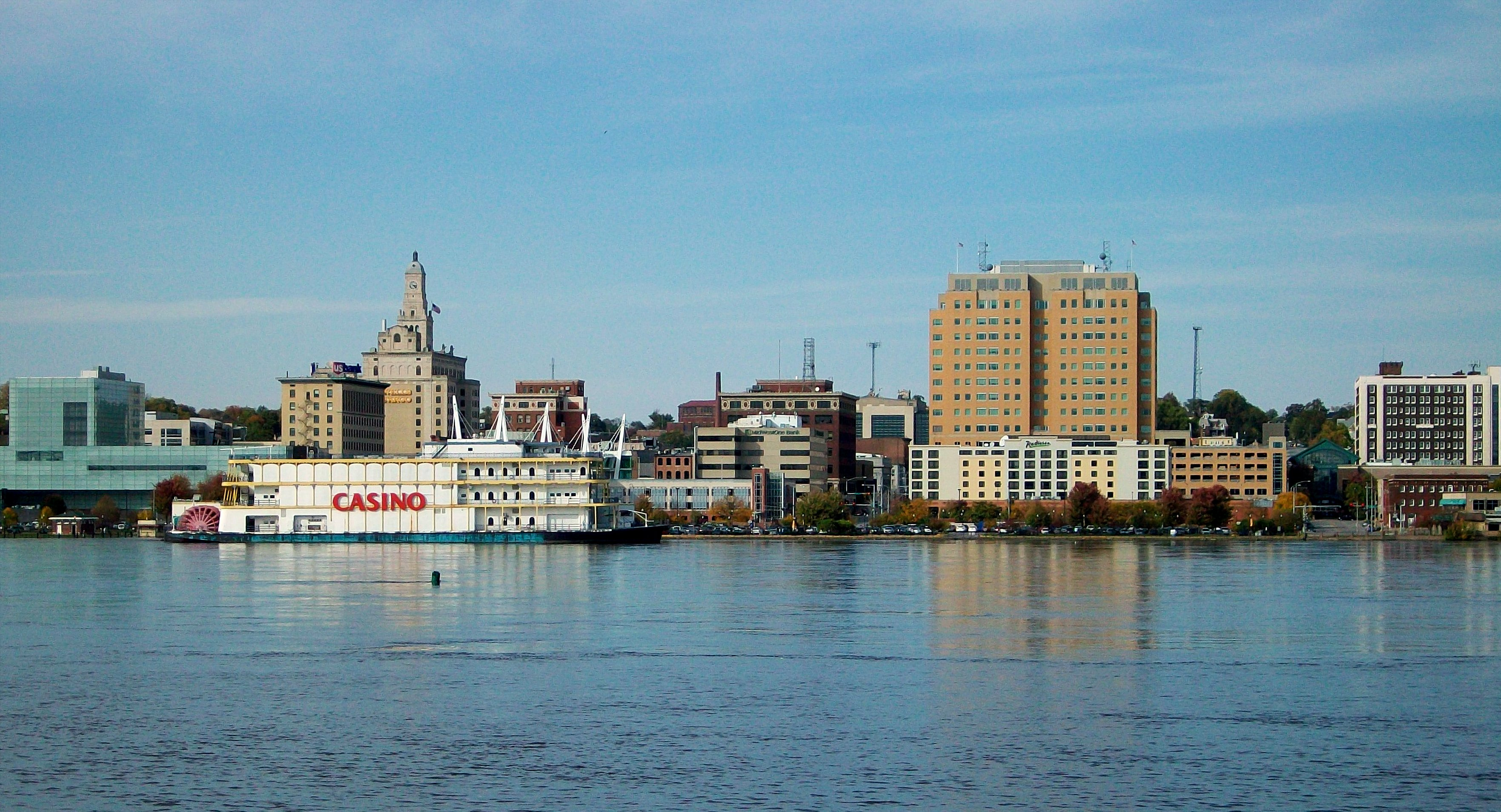
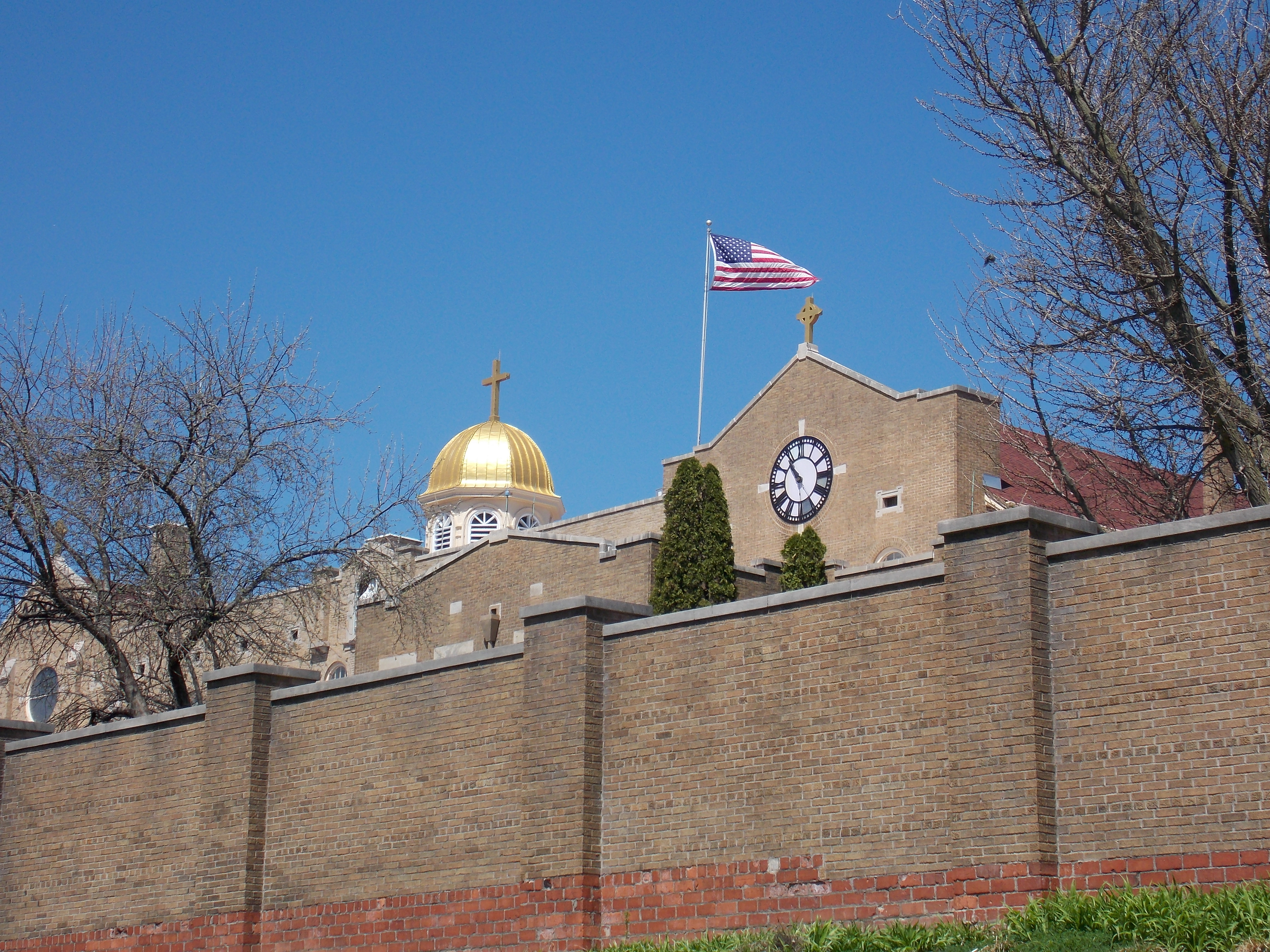
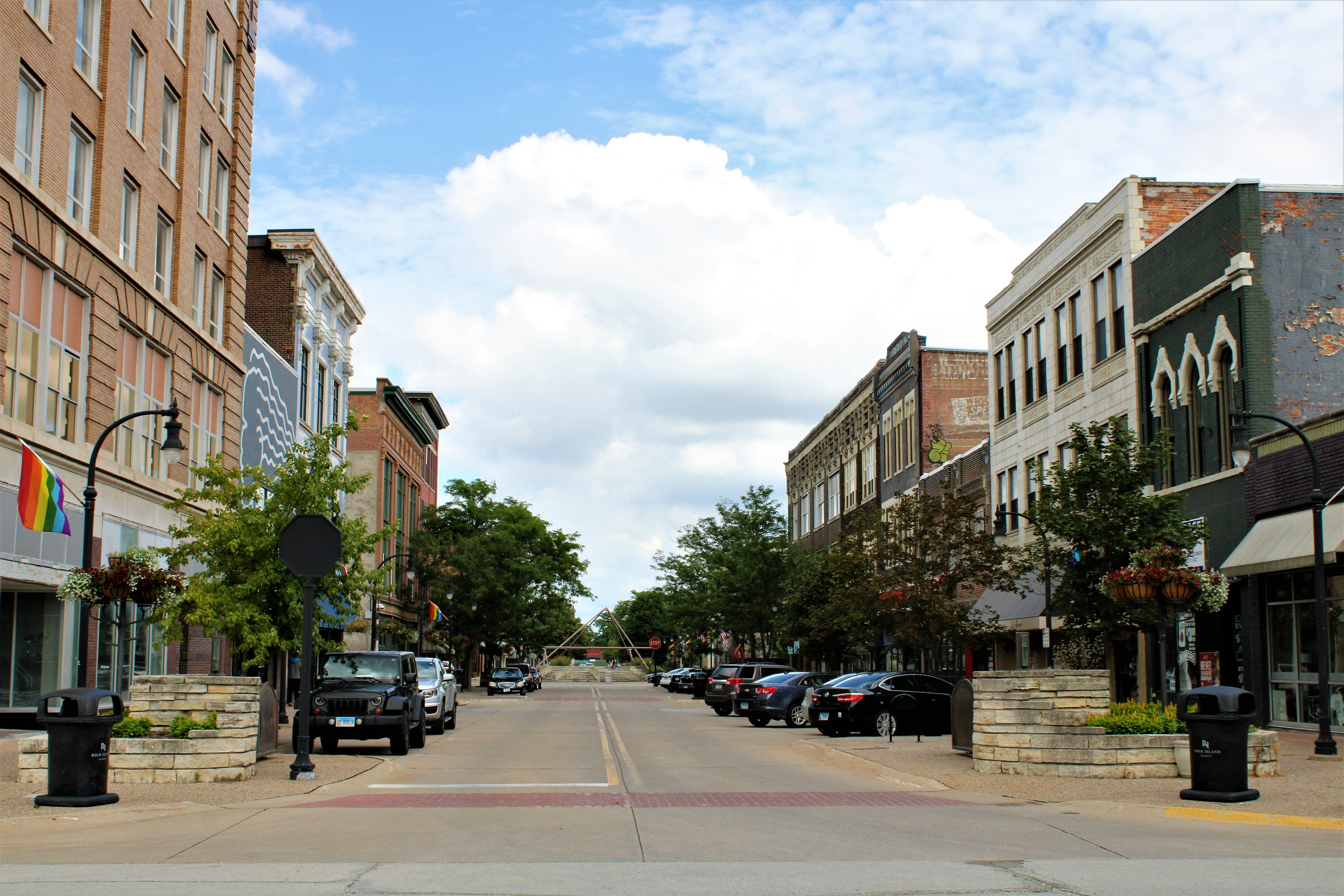
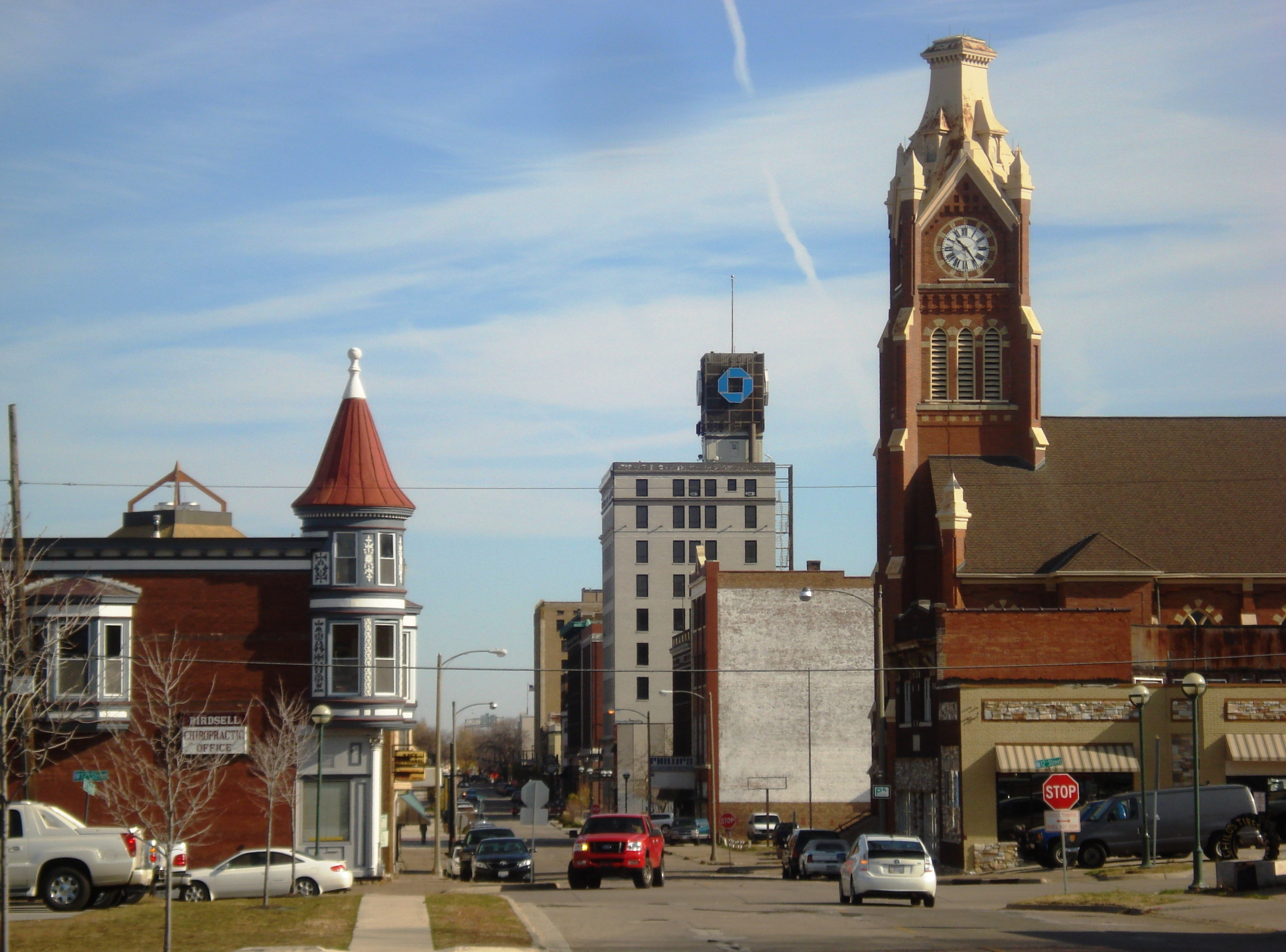
- Davenport Bettendorf Rock Island Moline
Map of Davenport–Moline, IA–IL CSA
City of Davenport, IA
City of Bettendorf, IA
City of Moline, IL
City of Rock Island, IL
Davenport–Moline–Rock Island, IA–IL MSA
Muscatine, IA μSA
Clinton, IA μSA
- Country: United States
- State: Iowa; Illinois
- Largest city: Davenport, Iowa
- Other cities: Moline, Illinois; Bettendorf, Iowa; Rock Island, Illinois; East Moline, Illinois

Area
  - Total: 170 sq mi (440 km^{2})
- Highest elevation: 850 ft (259 m)
- Lowest elevation: 590 ft (180 m)

Population
  - Total: 467,817 (148th)
  - Rank: 148th in the U.S.
  - Density: 1,600/sq mi (618/km^{2})

GDP
  - Total: $25.774 billion (2022)
- Time zone: UTC-06:00 (CST)
  - Summer (DST): UTC-05:00 (CDT)

The Quad Cities is a region of five cities in the U.S. states of Iowa and Illinois: Davenport and Bettendorf in southeastern Iowa, and Rock Island, Moline, and East Moline in northwestern Illinois. These cities are the center of the Quad Cities metropolitan area, a region within the Mississippi River Valley, which as of 2025, had a population estimate of 380,452 and a Combined Statistical Area (CSA) population of 468,307, making it the 148th-largest MSA and 91st-largest CSA in the nation.

== History ==
=== Early history ===
Before European settlers came to inhabit the Quad Cities, the confluence of rivers had attracted many varying cultures of indigenous peoples, who used the waterways and riverbanks for their settlements for thousands of years. At the time of European encounter, it was a home and principal trading place of the Sauk and Fox tribes of Native Americans. Saukenuk was the principal village of the Sauk tribe and birthplace of its 19th-century war chief, Black Hawk. In 1832, Sauk chief Keokuk and General Winfield Scott signed a treaty in Davenport after the US defeated the Sauk and their allies in the Black Hawk War. The treaty resulted in the Native Americans ceding 6 million acres (24,000 km^{2}) of land to the United States in exchange for a much smaller reservation elsewhere. Black Hawk State Historic Site in Rock Island preserves part of historic Saukenuk and is listed on the National Register of Historic Places.

The history of urban settlements in the Quad Cities was stimulated by riverboat traffic. For 14 miles (23 km) between LeClaire, Iowa, and Rock Island, the Mississippi River flowed across a series of finger-like rock projections protruding from either bank. These rapids were difficult for steamboats to traverse. As demand for river-based transportation increased along the upper Mississippi, the navigability of the river throughout the "Rock Island Rapids" became a greater concern. Over time, a minor industry grew up in the area to meet the steamboats' needs. Boat crews needed rest areas to stop before encountering the rapids, places to hire expert pilots such as Phillip Suiter, who was the first licensed pilot on the upper Mississippi River, to guide the boat through the rocky waters, or, when the water was low, places where goods could be removed and transported by wagon on land past the rapids. Today, the rocks are submerged six feet underwater by a lake formed by two locks and dams.

As the Industrial Revolution developed in the United States, many enterprising industrialists looked to the Mississippi River as a promising source of power generation. The combination of energy and easy access to river transportation attracted entrepreneurs and industrialists to the Quad Cities for development. In 1848, John Deere moved his plough business to Moline. His business was incorporated in 1868. John Deere is the largest employer today in the Quad Cities.

The first railroad bridge built across the Mississippi River connected Davenport and Rock Island in 1856. It was built by the Rock Island Railroad Company and replaced the slow seasonal ferry service and winter ice bridges as the primary modes of transportation across the river. Steamboaters saw the nationwide railroads as a threat to their business. On May 6, 1856, just weeks after completion of the bridge, an angry steamboater crashed the Effie Afton into it. John Hurd, the owner of the Effie Afton, filed a lawsuit against the Rock Island Railroad Company in Hurd v. Rock Island Bridge Company. The Rock Island Railroad Company selected Abraham Lincoln as their trial lawyer and won after he took the case to the US Supreme Court. Expert riverboat pilot Phillip Suiter was one of his witnesses. It was a pivotal trial in Lincoln's career.

=== Evolution of an identity ===
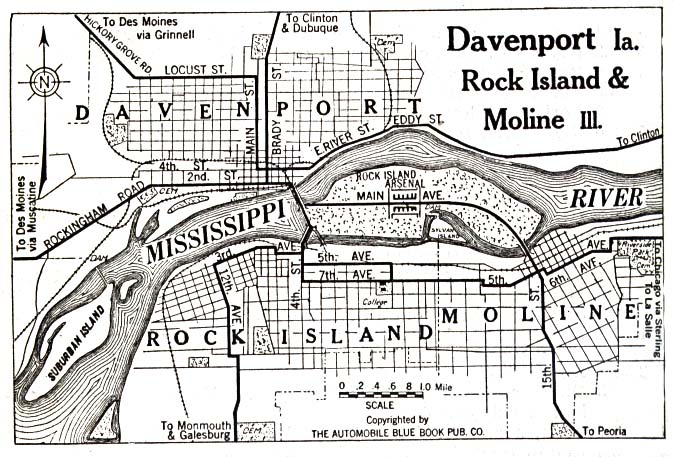
Map of the "Tri-Cities" in 1919

After the Civil War, the region began to gain a common identity. The river towns that were thoughtfully planned and competently led flourished, while other settlements, usually get-rich-quick schemes for speculators, failed to pan out. By World War I, the towns of Davenport, Rock Island, and Moline had begun to style themselves as the "Tri-Cities", a cluster of three more-or-less equally-sized river communities growing around the small bend of the Mississippi River where it flows west. But with the growth of Rock Island County, during the 1930s the term "Quad Cities" came into vogue, as East Moline was given "equal status". Despite the fact that the region had earned the name "Quad Cities", the National Basketball League and then the National Basketball Association had a franchise in Moline, Illinois, from 1946 to 1951 called the "Tri-Cities Blackhawks". Then, with the opening of an Alcoa (now Arconic) plant east of Davenport in 1948, the town of Bettendorf underwent so much growth that many people in the community discussed the adoption of the name "Quint Cities", but by this time, the name "Quad Cities" had become known well beyond the area, and "Quint Cities" never caught on, despite the efforts of WOC-TV (now KWQC-TV) and others. Consequently, when Bettendorf passed East Moline in size, there was some debate about whether Bettendorf had "displaced" East Moline. Instead, local officials, such as the Chamber of Commerce, have chosen an inclusive approach, maintaining the name "Quad Cities" yet including all five cities.

=== Since the 1980s ===
Beginning in the late 1970s, economic conditions caused major industrial restructuring, which disrupted the basis of the region's economy. The major companies, agricultural manufacturers, ceased or scaled back operations in the Quad Cities. Factories which closed included International Harvester (International Motors) in Rock Island and Case IH in Bettendorf. Moline-based John Deere cut its labor headcount by one half. Later in the 1980s, Caterpillar closed its factories at Mount Joy and Bettendorf.

Since the 1990s, the Quad Cities governments, businesses, non-profits and residents have worked hard to redevelop the region.

Examples of revitalization and rebirth include:

- Davenport's River Renaissance (a downtown revitalization project that includes a river music history center), an ag-tech venture capital campus, and the Figge Art Museum opened or were completed during the first decade of the 21st century.
- Moline has invested in what was once a robust downtown. The "John Deere Commons" and the Vibrant Arena at The MARK (formerly "The MARK of the Quad Cities", the "iWireless Center", and the "TaxSlayer Center") both opened during the 1990s.
- In 2007, Davenport and Rock Island competed for and won the title of "most livable small city" from the National Council of Mayors, based upon an unfunded proposal called RiverVision.
- In 2008 Bettendorf was ranked by CNN as one of the ten best places to buy a house in the United States.
- In 2010, the Quad Cities were named "the most affordable metro" by Forbes magazine.
- In 2012, Davenport housing market ranked second in the nation beating the housing bubble, due to its lack of foreclosures and their low unemployment.
- In 2012, the Quad Cities Metropolitan Area was ranked among the fastest-growing areas in the nation in the growth of high-tech jobs.
- In 2012, the Quad Cities were named the "2012 All American City"
- In 2013, Modern Woodman Park was voted the best minor league ballpark in America.

=== Proposed mergers ===
Over the years, several communities in the Quad Cities region have proposed or performed mergers. As it grew, Davenport annexed the communities of Rockingham, Nahant, Probstei, East Davenport, Oakdale, Cawiezeel, Blackhawk, Mt. Joy, Green Tree, and others. Bettendorf annexed portions of Pleasant Valley in the 1970s. In 1987, Rock Island, Moline, East Moline, Milan, Carbon Cliff, Hampton, Coal Valley and Silvis considered a super-city merger which would have seen the Illinois cities become the second-largest city in the state, but the proposal ultimately failed. Moline and East Moline considered a merger in 1997. That same year, Green Rock and Colona did merge. Bettendorf and Riverdale also considered a merger.

== Geography ==
The Quad Cities is located at the confluence of the Rock and Mississippi rivers, approximately 140 miles (230 km) west of Chicago, and forms the largest metropolitan area along the Mississippi River between Minneapolis–Saint Paul and the St. Louis metropolitan area. Interstate 80 crosses the Mississippi River here. The Quad Cities Metropolitan Area consists of three counties: Scott County in Iowa, and Rock Island County and Henry County in Illinois. The Quad Cities Metropolitan Area is also considered part of the Great Lakes Megalopolis.

The Quad Cities area is distinctive because the Mississippi River flows from east to west as it passes through the heart of the area; the Iowa cities of Davenport and Bettendorf are located due north of Rock Island and Moline, respectively.

Climate data for Quad Cities (Quad City International Airport), 1991–2020 normals, (Note: Mean monthly maxima and minima (i.e. the expected highest and lowest temperature readings at any point during the year or given month) calculated based on data at said location from 1991 to 2020.) extremes 1871–present (Note: Official precipitation records for the Quad Cities kept at the Weather Bureau Office (WBO) in Davenport, Iowa from July 1871 to December 1931, alternating between Quad City Int'l (KMLI) and the Davenport WBO from January 1932 to 17 February 1937, and remaining at KMLI since 18 February 1937. Temperature, snowfall, and snow depth records date to 1 January 1874, 1 August 1882, and 1 January 1901, respectively. For more information, see Threadex)
Month	Jan	Feb	Mar	Apr	May	Jun	Jul	Aug	Sep	Oct	Nov	Dec	Year
Record high °F (°C)	69 (21)	79 (26)	88 (31)	93 (34)	104 (40)	104 (40)	111 (44)	106 (41)	100 (38)	95 (35)	80 (27)	75 (24)	111 (44)
Mean maximum °F (°C)	53.4 (11.9)	57.6 (14.2)	73.6 (23.1)	82.7 (28.2)	89.2 (31.8)	94.0 (34.4)	95.1 (35.1)	93.8 (34.3)	91.2 (32.9)	84.1 (28.9)	69.8 (21.0)	57.6 (14.2)	96.9 (36.1)
Mean daily maximum °F (°C)	31.8 (−0.1)	36.6 (2.6)	49.9 (9.9)	63.0 (17.2)	73.9 (23.3)	83.1 (28.4)	86.1 (30.1)	84.1 (28.9)	77.9 (25.5)	64.8 (18.2)	49.8 (9.9)	37.0 (2.8)	61.5 (16.4)
Daily mean °F (°C)	23.3 (−4.8)	27.7 (−2.4)	39.7 (4.3)	51.4 (10.8)	62.5 (16.9)	72.1 (22.3)	75.5 (24.2)	73.4 (23.0)	66.1 (18.9)	53.7 (12.1)	40.4 (4.7)	28.9 (−1.7)	51.2 (10.7)
Mean daily minimum °F (°C)	14.8 (−9.6)	18.8 (−7.3)	29.6 (−1.3)	39.9 (4.4)	51.1 (10.6)	61.0 (16.1)	64.9 (18.3)	62.7 (17.1)	54.2 (12.3)	42.6 (5.9)	30.9 (−0.6)	20.8 (−6.2)	40.9 (4.9)
Mean minimum °F (°C)	−9.4 (−23.0)	−2.3 (−19.1)	9.6 (−12.4)	24.7 (−4.1)	35.2 (1.8)	48.0 (8.9)	54.0 (12.2)	52.1 (11.2)	39.1 (3.9)	26.3 (−3.2)	14.1 (−9.9)	−0.2 (−17.9)	−14.2 (−25.7)
Record low °F (°C)	−33 (−36)	−28 (−33)	−19 (−28)	7 (−14)	25 (−4)	39 (4)	46 (8)	40 (4)	24 (−4)	11 (−12)	−10 (−23)	−24 (−31)	−33 (−36)
Average precipitation inches (mm)	1.66 (42)	1.83 (46)	2.62 (67)	3.81 (97)	4.67 (119)	5.01 (127)	4.23 (107)	3.97 (101)	3.32 (84)	2.81 (71)	2.30 (58)	2.04 (52)	38.27 (972)
Average snowfall inches (cm)	10.8 (27)	8.6 (22)	4.4 (11)	1.1 (2.8)	0.0 (0.0)	0.0 (0.0)	0.0 (0.0)	0.0 (0.0)	0.0 (0.0)	0.3 (0.76)	2.1 (5.3)	8.8 (22)	36.1 (92)
Average precipitation days (≥ 0.01 in)	9.3	8.7	10.4	11.3	12.2	11.3	8.6	9.4	8.4	9.0	8.9	9.5	117.0
Average snowy days (≥ 0.1 in)	7.2	6.0	3.2	0.8	0.0	0.0	0.0	0.0	0.0	0.3	1.7	5.9	25.1
Average relative humidity (%)	69.9	69.8	68.3	64.3	64.9	65.8	70.5	73.3	72.8	68.1	71.3	74.0	69.4
Average dew point °F (°C)	11.7 (−11.3)	16.2 (−8.8)	27.0 (−2.8)	37.2 (2.9)	48.2 (9.0)	57.9 (14.4)	64.0 (17.8)	62.6 (17.0)	54.3 (12.4)	41.5 (5.3)	30.4 (−0.9)	18.3 (−7.6)	39.1 (3.9)
Mean monthly sunshine hours	148.1	153.8	180.5	210.1	255.1	284.6	301.9	271.4	222.0	192.9	121.7	113.9	2,456
Percentage possible sunshine	50	52	49	53	57	63	66	63	59	56	41	40	55
Source: NOAA (relative humidity, dew point, and sun 1961−1990)

== Demographics ==
According to the 2010 United States census Count, the metropolitan area grew to 471,551. As of the 2000 census, a total of 96,495 households and 60,535 families resided in the area.

=== Race and ethnicity ===
The racial makeup of the area is 90.6% White (410,861), 3.7% Black or African American (27,757), 0.6% American Indian and Alaskan Native (1,255), 1.0% Asian (6,624), 0.03% Pacific Islander (156), and 2.0% from two or more races (11,929). 7.1% of the population is Hispanic or Latino of any race (37,070). The predominant ethnicities in the Quad Cities are of northern European descent, including German, Irish, and English, as well Scandinavian (Mostly Swedish and Norwegian) and Dutch. The primary minority groups in the area are African-Americans, which in Davenport make up the third largest black population in the state of Iowa, a community dating back to the 1830s when Iowa was a free territory. Many of the metro area's African-American residents have roots in the Southern and Border states of the U.S., including Mississippi, Arkansas, Alabama, Missouri, Kentucky and Virginia. The most significant Asian-American populations are South Asian and Vietnamese American.

=== Religion ===
According to resources, Christianity is the largest religion practiced in the area. However, the two states have a different population of Christian groups. In Davenport and Bettendorf, Catholics make up an 18.5% plurality, but Protestants with 15.1% Mainline and 11.6% Evangelical make up large minorities as well. The Black Protestants on the Iowa side comes in at 1.2%. On the Illinois side, between Rock Island, Moline, and East Moline, Catholicism is less prevalent at 12.4%, and at 12.5% Evangelical and 11.0% Mainline have smaller declines.

The Jewish population is about 500–600, which is down from about 1,800–2,000 in the 1950s and 1960s.

== Metropolitan area ==
The Quad Cities metropolitan area, more formally known as the Davenport–Moline–Rock Island, IA–IL Metropolitan Statistical Area (MSA), is the metropolitan area associated with the Quad Cities in the U.S. states of Iowa and Illinois. The Davenport–Moline–Rock Island MSA consists of four counties – Scott County in Iowa and Henry, Mercer, and Rock Island counties in Illinois – and had an estimated population of 380,452 as of 2025.

The Quad Cities metropolitan area is also considered part of the Great Lakes Megalopolis, and is the largest metropolitan area along the Mississippi River in Iowa and between Minneapolis–Saint Paul and the St. Louis metropolitan area.

=== Population by County ===
County	State	Seat	2025 estimate	2020 census	Change	Area	Density
Scott	Iowa	Davenport	175,259	174,669	+0.34%	468 sq mi (1,210 km^{2})	374/sq mi (145/km^{2})
Rock Island	Illinois	Rock Island	141,869	144,672	−1.94%	451 sq mi (1,170 km^{2})	315/sq mi (121/km^{2})
Henry	Illinois	Cambridge	48,095	49,284	−2.41%	826 sq mi (2,140 km^{2})	58/sq mi (22/km^{2})
Mercer	Illinois	Aledo	15,229	15,699	−2.99%	569 sq mi (1,470 km^{2})	27/sq mi (10/km^{2})
Total			380,452	384,324	−1.01%	2,314 sq mi (5,990 km^{2})	164/sq mi (63/km^{2})

=== Population by City ===
2020 rank	City	State	County	2020 Census	2010 Census	Change
1	Davenport	Iowa	Scott	101,724	99,685	+2.05%
2	Moline	Illinois	Rock Island	42,985	43,483	−1.15%
3	Bettendorf	Iowa	Scott	39,102	33,217	+17.72%
4	Rock Island	Illinois	Rock Island	37,108	39,018	−4.90%
5	East Moline	Illinois	Rock Island	21,374	21,302	+0.34%
6	Silvis	Illinois	Rock Island	8,003	7,479	+7.01%
7	Eldridge	Iowa	Scott	6,726	5,651	+19.02%
8	Geneseo	Illinois	Henry	6,539	6,586	−0.71%
9	Milan	Illinois	Rock Island	5,097	5,099	−0.04%
10	Colona	Illinois	Henry	5,045	5,099	−1.06%
11	Le Claire	Iowa	Scott	4,710	3,765	+25.10%
12	Coal Valley	Illinois	Rock Island, Henry	3,873	3,743	+3.47%
13	Aledo	Illinois	Mercer	3,633	3,640	−0.19%
14	Park View	Iowa	Scott	2,709	2,389	+13.39%
15	Cambridge	Illinois	Henry	2,086	2,160	−3.43%
16	Carbon Cliff	Illinois	Rock Island	1,846	2,134	−13.50%
17	Hampton	Illinois	Rock Island	1,779	1,863	−4.51%
18	Orion	Illinois	Henry	1,754	1,861	−5.75%
19	Port Byron	Illinois	Rock Island	1,668	1,647	+1.28%
20	Blue Grass	Iowa	Scott, Muscatine	1,666	1,452	+14.74%
21	Walcott	Iowa	Scott	1,551	1,629	−4.79%
22	Andalusia	Illinois	Rock Island	1,184	1,178	+0.51%
23	Buffalo	Iowa	Scott	1,176	1,270	−7.40%
24	Atkinson	Illinois	Henry	965	972	−0.72%
25	Rapids City	Illinois	Rock Island	964	959	+0.52%
26	Princeton	Iowa	Scott	923	886	+4.18%
27	Annawan	Illinois	Henry	884	878	+0.68%
28	Coyne Center	Illinois	Rock Island	877	0	NA
29	Viola	Illinois	Mercer	869	955	−9.01%
30	Long Grove	Iowa	Scott	838	808	+3.71%
31	Matherville	Illinois	Mercer	707	723	−2.21%
32	Sherrard	Illinois	Mercer	692	640	+8.13%
33	Cordova	Illinois	Rock Island	671	672	−0.15%
34	Andover	Illinois	Henry	555	578	−3.98%
35	Reynolds	Illinois	Rock Island, Mercer	498	539	−7.61%
36	Oak Grove	Illinois	Rock Island	476	396	+20.20%
37	Hillsdale	Illinois	Rock Island	417	523	−20.27%
38	Edgington	Illinois	Rock Island	391	0	NA
39	Riverdale	Iowa	Scott	379	405	−6.42%
40	Donahue	Iowa	Scott	335	346	−3.18%
41	McCausland	Iowa	Scott	313	291	+7.56%
42	Campbell's Island	Illinois	Rock Island	275	0	NA
43	Preemption	Illinois	Mercer	254	0	NA
44	Dixon	Iowa	Scott	202	247	−18.22%
45	Montpelier	Iowa	Scott, Muscatine	186	0	NA
46	Rock Island Arsenal	Illinois	Rock Island	182	149	+22.15%
47	Cleveland	Illinois	Henry	163	188	−13.30%
48	North Henderson	Illinois	Mercer	162	187	−13.37%
49	Illinois City	Illinois	Rock Island	159	0	NA
50	Maysville	Iowa	Scott	156	176	−11.36%
51	Taylor Ridge	Illinois	Rock Island	141	0	NA
52	Panorama Park	Iowa	Scott	139	129	+7.75%
53	New Liberty	Iowa	Scott	138	137	+0.73%
54	Ophiem	Illinois	Henry	123	0	NA
55	Osco	Illinois	Henry	108	0	NA
56	Barstow	Illinois	Rock Island	89	0	NA
57	Lynn Center	Illinois	Henry	85	0	NA
58	Joslin	Illinois	Rock Island	85	0	NA
59	Buffalo Prairie	Illinois	Rock Island	64	0	NA
60	Big Rock	Iowa	Scott, Clinton	49	0	NA
61	Argo	Iowa	Scott	44	0	NA
62	Nekoma	Illinois	Henry	23	0	NA
63	Plainview	Iowa	Scott	19	0	NA

=== Places with over 100,000 inhabitants ===
- Davenport, Iowa

=== Places with 10,001 to 100,000 inhabitants ===
- Moline, Illinois
- Bettendorf, Iowa
- Rock Island, Illinois
- East Moline, Illinois

=== Places with 1,001 to 10,000 inhabitants ===
- Andalusia, Illinois
- Aledo, Illinois
- Blue Grass, Iowa
- Buffalo, Iowa
- Cambridge, Illinois
- Carbon Cliff, Illinois
- Coal Valley, Illinois
- Colona, Illinois
- Eldridge, Iowa
- Geneseo, Illinois
- Hampton, Illinois
- Le Claire, Iowa
- Milan, Illinois
- Orion, Illinois
- Park View, Iowa
- Port Byron, Illinois
- Silvis, Illinois
- Walcott, Iowa

=== Places with fewer than 1,000 inhabitants ===
- Andover, Illinois
- Annawan, Illinois
- Atkinson, Illinois
- Cleveland, Illinois
- Dixon, Iowa
- Donahue, Iowa
- Long Grove, Iowa
- Matherville, Illinois
- Maysville, Iowa
- McCausland, Iowa
- New Liberty, Iowa
- North Henderson, Illinois
- Panorama Park, Iowa
- Pleasant Valley, Iowa
- Princeton, Iowa
- Riverdale, Iowa
- Sherrard, Illinois
- Viola, Illinois

=== Unincorporated places ===
- Barstow, Illinois
- Creekville, Iowa
- Dayton, Illinois
- Lynn Center, Illinois
- Montpelier, Iowa
- Mount Joy, Iowa
- Nekoma, Illinois
- Osco, Illinois
- Ophiem, Illinois
- Park View, Iowa
- Preemption, Illinois

== Landmarks ==
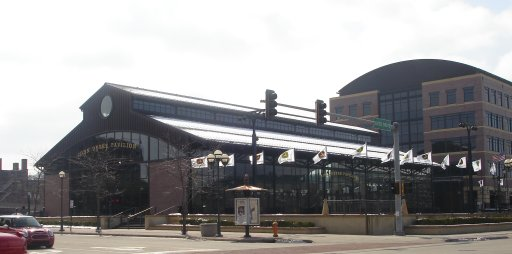
The John Deere Pavilion in Moline

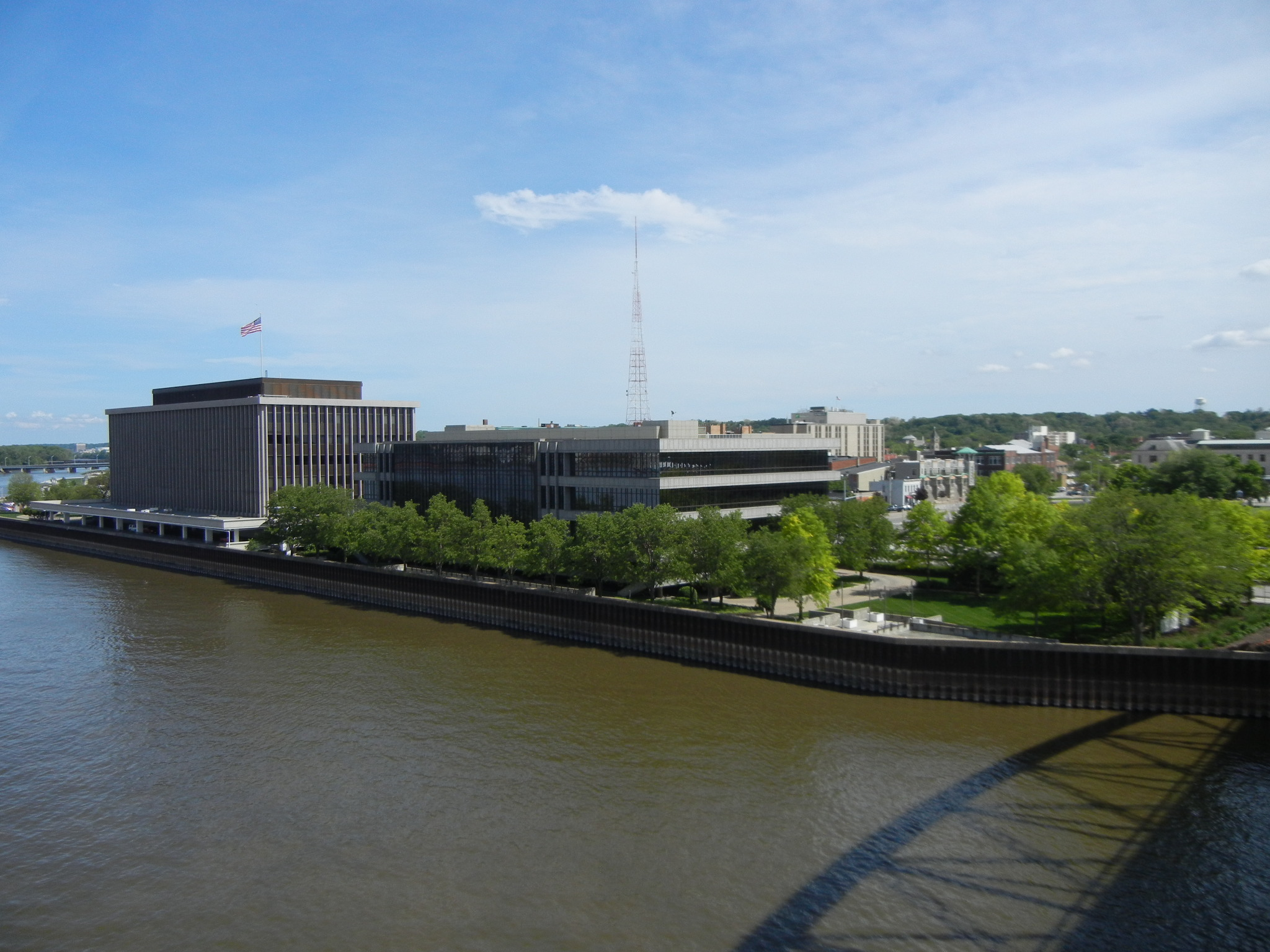
Downtown Rock Island, Illinois

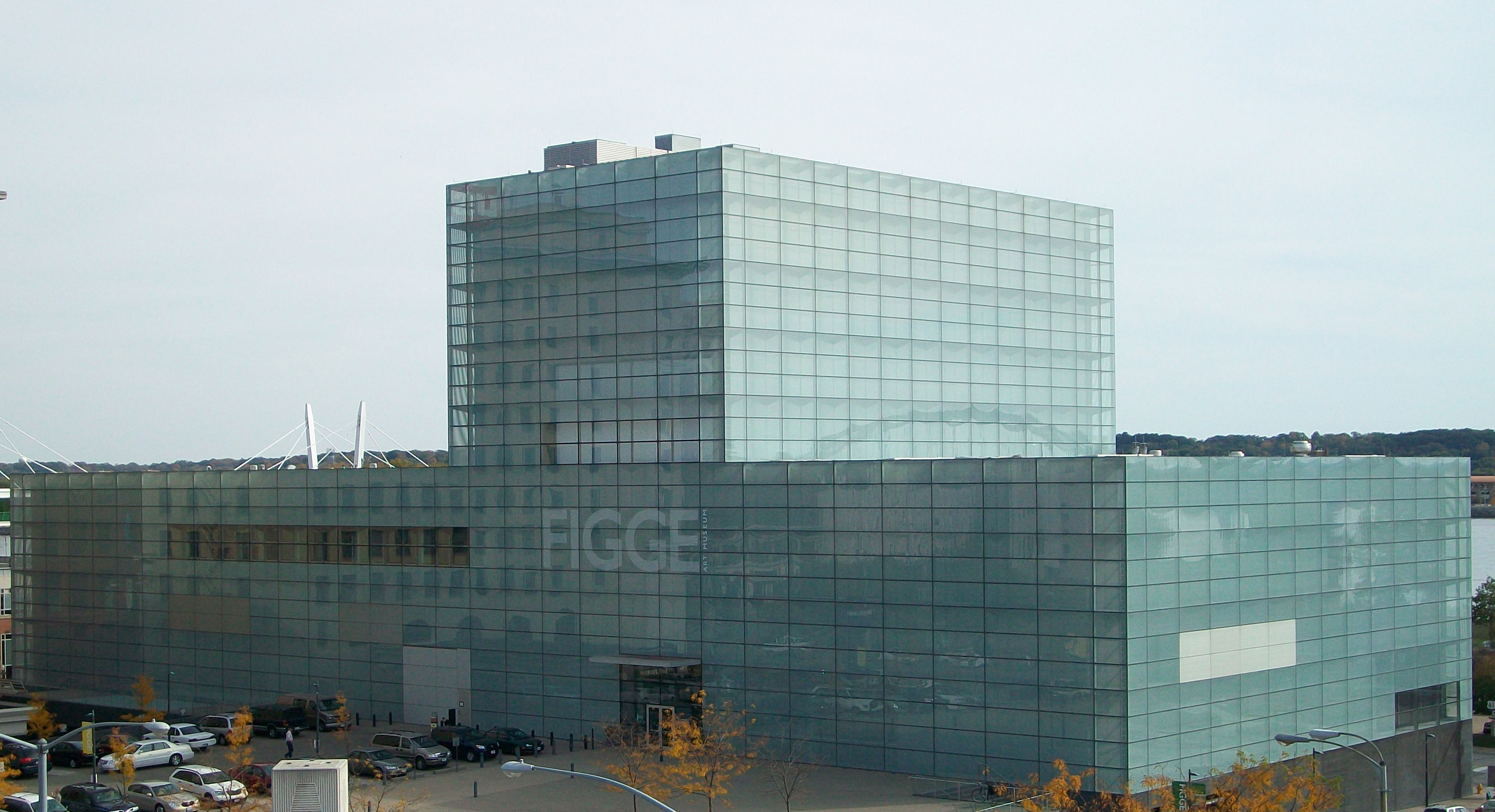
The Figge Art Museum in Downtown Davenport, Iowa

- The business Antique Archeology, featured on the History Channel show American Pickers, is located in LeClaire
- Brady Street Stadium, a major high-school sports venue along Davenport's Brady Street (U.S. 61)
- The Col Ballroom, a small arena for music concerts, in Davenport
- Davenport Skybridge
- Figge Art Museum, Davenport, formerly the Davenport Museum of Art, designed by British architect David Chipperfield and opened in 2005. Its holdings include extensive collections of Haitian, colonial Mexican and Midwestern art, particularly pieces by Thomas Hart Benton, Marvin Cone and Grant Wood, and personal effects from Wood's estate.
- Fred Schwengel Memorial Bridge, a four-lane steel-girder bridge on Interstate 80, crossing the Mississippi River to connect LeClaire and Rapids City. Opened in 1966.
- Government Bridge, a double-decked bridge adjacent to Lock and Dam 15, carrying motor and rail traffic between Arsenal Island and Davenport. The 1896 truss bridge, about 1,950 feet long, includes a 360-degree swing span over the twin locks. It connects to the Illinois side of the river via the Rock Island Viaduct.
- Iowa 80 Truck Stop – the world's largest truck stop is along Interstate 80 near Walcott, Iowa, west of Davenport.
- Interstate 74 Bridge, formerly known as the "Iowa-Illinois Memorial Bridge", connecting Bettendorf and Moline. The twin suspension spans across the Mississippi River were built in 1935 and 1959 and adapted to carry Interstate 74 in the early 1970s. The twinned towers are a symbol of the two-state Quad Cities community. The bridge is set to be replaced with eight lanes.
- John Deere Pavilion, a small museum and showcase for John Deere equipment, built adjacent to the John Deere Commons in the 1990s in downtown Moline.
- John Deere World Headquarters, designed by Eero Saarinen and completed in 1963 in Moline.
- The John Looney Mansion, designed and built in 1897 for the attorney, publisher and gangster John Looney in Rock Island which still stands off 20th Street and 17th Avenue.
- Lock and Dam No. 15, a 1,200-foot roller dam with twin locks across the Mississippi River between Arsenal Island and Davenport. The roller dam, billed as the longest of its type, maintains a pool upstream that allows river traffic to pass through the once notorious Rock Island Rapids.
- Mississippi Valley Fairgrounds, a fair and exposition venue in Davenport
- Modern Woodmen Park, formerly John O'Donnell Stadium, home of the Kansas City Royals' class high A affiliate, the Quad Cities River Bandits, on the Davenport riverfront. With the lights of Rock Island across the Mississippi and the Centennial Bridge looming just beyond the right-field fence, the park was named by USA Today as one of 10 great places for a baseball pilgrimage. The ball park added a 110 ft. Ferris wheel before the start of the 2014 season.
- Old Main, completed in 1888, the oldest building on the campus of Augustana College. Located on a bluff overlooking the Mississippi River, its iconic and newly renovated dome was lighted as of October 2011.
- Putnam Museum in Davenport
- Quad City Botanical Center in Rock Island
- Quad Cities Waterfront Convention Center, located in Bettendorf
- RiverCenter/Adler Theatre, a convention and performing-arts complex in Davenport. The 2,400-seat Adler is the former RKO Orpheum Theater, which opened in 1931, designed by A.S. Graven of Chicago, whose projects included the Drake Hotel in Chicago and the Paramount Theater in New York City. The theater was extensively renovated and expanded in 1984–86 and 2005.
- River Music Experience, a performance, education and music-history venue in the Redstone Building, the former Petersen Harned Von Maur department store
- Rock Island Arsenal, manufacturer of military equipment and ordnance since the 1880s, now the largest government-owned weapons manufacturing arsenal in the United States. The arsenal is located on Arsenal Island (formerly known as Rock Island) in the Mississippi River between Davenport, Iowa, and Rock Island, Illinois. Fort Armstrong was built there in 1816. During the civil war, the island held a Union prison camp for Confederate soldiers. The Federal-style home of Colonel George Davenport, built in 1833–34, the oldest extant building in the Quad Cities, is on the north bank of the island.
- Rock Island Centennial Bridge over the Mississippi River between downtown Davenport and Rock Island, completed in 1940 to commemorate Rock Island's 100th anniversary. The five arches of the 3,853-foot through-arch bridge often are used as a symbol of the Quad Cities.
- Rock Island County Fairgrounds in East Moline, also the site of the Quad City Speedway
- Rock Island Auction Company from the Discovery Channel show Ready, Aim, Sold!
- Vibrant Arena at The MARK – a 12,000-seat arena in Moline (formerly The Mark of the Quad Cities, the iWireless Center, and the TaxSlayer Center).
- Vander Veer Botanical Park is a 33-acre (130,000 m2) botanical garden in the Vander Veer Park Historic District of Davenport, Iowa. It is believed to be one of the first botanical parks west of the Mississippi River.
- The Quarter – a 90-acre (360,000 m^{2}) site in East Moline, alongside the Mississippi River, featuring shops, restaurants, condominiums, boat docks, sports and interpretive centers, and a working lighthouse, currently under development. (Geographical coordinates: 41°31′47″N 90°26′16″W)
- Chicago, Milwaukee, St. Paul and Pacific Freight House, referred to locally as the "Freight House", is an entertainment venue
- TBK Bank Sports Complex, also known as the BettPlex, is a state-of-the-art sport and entertainment complex. Containing eight full-size volleyball and basketball courts. Four indoor and five outdoor sand volleyball courts, 10 lighted outdoor baseball and softball fields, the BettPlex is a 45 million dollar sporting facility that was created to host weekend sporting tournaments in the Quad Cities.

== Noteworthy companies ==
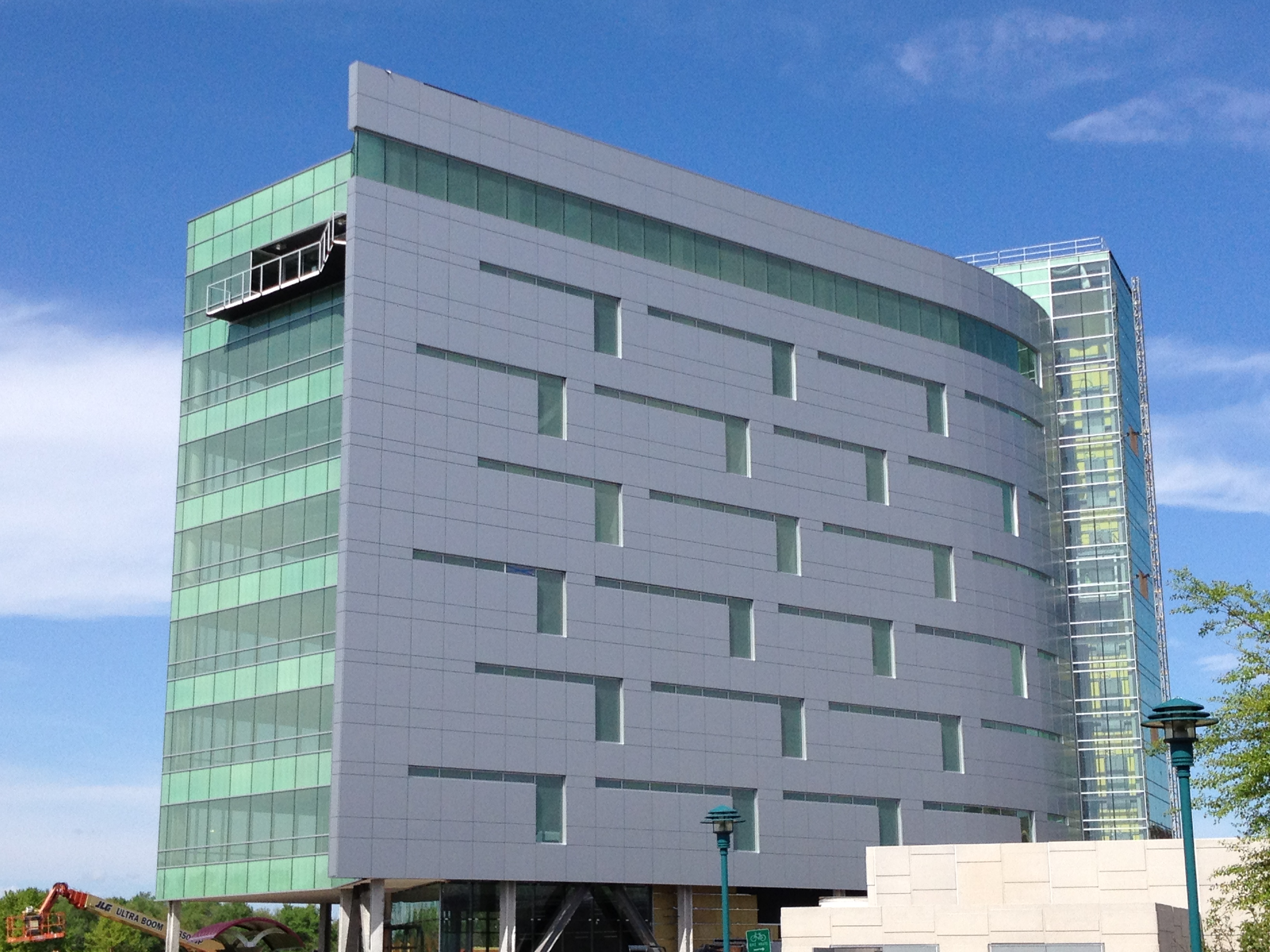
The new Kone Building in Downtown Moline, Illinois.

- Arconic
- Cobham plc
- Deere & Company (also known as/branded: John Deere)
- Genesis Health System
- Group O
- Guardian Industries
- Happy Joe's
- KONE, Inc (formerly Montgomery Elevator)
- Lee Enterprises
- Lewis Machine and Tool Company
- Modern Woodmen of America
- Nestlé Purina PetCare
- QCR Holdings
- Sears Seating (also known as Sears Manufacturing)
- Von Maur
- Whitey's Ice Cream

== Top employers ==
According to the Quad Cities Chamber of Commerce website, the top employers in the Quad Cities area are:

Rank	Employer	# of employees	Industry
1	Deere & Company	6,700	Agricultural Innovation
2	Rock Island Arsenal	6,300	Defense Manufacturing
3	UnityPoint Health - Trinity	6,100	Healthcare
4	Genesis Health System	4,700	Healthcare
5	Hy-Vee	4,200	Grocery
6	Walmart	3,600	Warehouse Clubs and Supercenters
7	HNI Corporation/The Hon Company/Allsteel	3,100	Office Furniture Manufacturing
8	Arconic	2,400	Aerospace and Defense Aluminum
*	Tyson Fresh Meats	2,400	Food Processing
10	Amazon	1,500	Conglomerate

== Notable people ==
- Eddie Albert, actor, Rock Island
- Ken Anderson, football player and coach, Rock Island
- Pat Angerer, football player, Bettendorf
- Matthew Ashford, actor, Davenport
- Tavian Banks, football player, Bettendorf
- Bonnie Bartlett, actress, Moline
- Scott Beck, filmmaker, Bettendorf
- Bix Beiderbecke, jazz musician, Davenport
- Louis Bellson, drummer, Moline
- Vincent Hugo Bendix, inventor and industrialist, Moline
- Ken Berry, actor, Moline
- Joseph W. Bettendorf, industrialist, Bettendorf (Gilbert)
- William P. Bettendorf, industrialist, Bettendorf (Gilbert)
- Black Hawk, band leader and warrior of the Sauk people
- Isabel Bloom, artist, Davenport
- Lisa Bluder, basketball coach, Marion
- Dave Blunts, Rapper, Davenport
- Suzy Bogguss, country singer, Aledo
- Ken Bowman, football player, Milan
- Lara Flynn Boyle, actress, Davenport
- Ambrose Burke, priest and college president, Davenport
- Mike Butcher, pitcher and coach, Davenport
- Branden Campbell, bassist for the Neon Trees, Davenport
- Louise Carver, actress, Davenport
- Samuel Franklin Cody, aviator, Davenport
- William F. "Buffalo Bill" Cody, pioneer, LeClaire
- Danielle Colby, reality star American Pickers, Davenport/LeClaire
- Jude Cole, musician, Carbon Cliff
- Martin Cone, priest and college president, Davenport
- Ed Conroy, basketball coach, Davenport
- George Cram Cook, author, Davenport
- Roger Craig, football player, Davenport
- Doris Davenport, actress, Moline
- Colonel George Davenport, pioneer, US Army officer
- Dana Davis, actress, Davenport
- Ricky Davis, basketball player, Davenport
- John Deere, inventor, Moline
- Frederick Denkmann, lumber baron, Rock Island
- Justin Diercks, racecar driver, Davenport
- Acie Earl, basketball player, Moline
- Eugene Burton Ely, aviation pioneer, Davenport
- Lane Evans, United States congressman, Rock Island
- Bill Fitch, NBA basketball player and coach, Davenport
- John Flannagan, priest and college president, Davenport
- Jack Fleck, golfer, 1955 U.S. Open champion, Bettendorf
- Joe Frisco, vaudeville performer, Davenport
- John Getz, actor, Davenport
- Susan Glaspell, writer, Davenport
- Ethan Happ, Big Ten basketball player, Milan
- Warren Hearnes, governor of Missouri, Moline
- Austin Howard, football player, Davenport
- Jim Jensen, NFL running back, Davenport
- Jesse Johnson (musician), The Time, Rock Island
- Mark Johnson, Olympic wrestler, Rock Island
- James Jones, football player, Davenport
- Gail Karp, cantor of the Reform Jewish synagogue, Davenport
- Hazel Keener, actress, Bettendorf and Davenport
- Madison Keys, tennis player, Rock Island
- Josh Kroeger, athlete, Davenport
- Steve Kuberski, basketball player, Moline
- Perry Lafferty, producer, Davenport
- Kari Lake, political figure, Rock Island
- Elmer Layden, athlete and coach, Davenport
- Jim Leach, politician, Davenport
- Johnny Lujack, quarterback, 1947 Heisman Trophy winner, Bettendorf
- Sue Lyon, actress, Davenport
- Helen Mack, actress, Rock Island
- Cletus Madsen, priest and college president, Davenport
- Stuart Margolin, actor and director, Davenport
- Elisabeth Maurus, musician, Rock Island
- Carl Meinberg, priest and college president, Davenport
- Sebastian Menke, priest and college president, Davenport
- Julia Michaels, musician, Davenport
- Pat Miletich, MMA fighter, Bettendorf
- Marvin Mottet, priest, Davenport
- Don Nelson, NBA basketball player and coach, Rock Island
- Michael Nunn, boxer, Davenport
- Spike O'Dell, radio personality, East Moline
- Gerald Francis O'Keefe, priest, Davenport
- Gene Oliver, MLB player, Rock Island
- Eric Christian Olsen, actor, Bettendorf
- Daniel David Palmer, chiropractor, Davenport
- Oran Pape, state patrol, Davenport
- Laurdine Patrick, musician, East Moline
- Mary Beth Peil, actress and singer, Davenport
- Nat Pendleton, wrestler and actor, Davenport
- Roger Perry, actor, Davenport
- James Philbrook, actor, Davenport
- Scott Pose, MLB baseball player, Davenport
- Hiram Price, politician, Davenport
- Margo Price, country singer, Aledo
- Linnea Quigley, actress and producer, Davenport
- Ed Reimers, announcer, Moline
- Otto Frederick Rohwedder, engineer, inventor of sliced bread, Davenport
- Seth Rollins, WWE wrestler, Davenport
- Randy Shilts, journalist, Davenport
- Jim Skinner, CEO of McDonald's, Davenport
- Roby Smith, Treasurer of Iowa, Davenport
- Dean Stone, MLB pitcher, Silvis
- Tim Sylvia, MMA fighter, Bettendorf
- Julian Vandervelde, football player, Davenport
- Hynden Walch, actress, Davenport
- Henry Cantwell Wallace, U.S. Secretary of Agriculture, Rock Island
- Friedrich Weyerhäuser, lumber baron, Rock Island
- Dwight Deere Wiman, Broadway producer, Moline
- Bryan Woods, filmmaker, Bettendorf

== Education ==
=== Colleges and universities ===
- Augustana College – A private, four-year liberal arts college in Rock Island.
- Bible Missionary Institute – A Bible college in Rock Island affiliated with the Bible Missionary Church.
- Black Hawk College – Community college in Moline, with a satellite campus in Kewanee, Illinois.
- Eastern Iowa Community College District – Consisting of campuses in Bettendorf, Clinton, Downtown Davenport referred to as the Urban Campus and Muscatine. Bettendorf's campus is known as Scott Community College.
- Palmer Chiropractic College – Davenport, first chiropractic school in the world.
- Saint Ambrose University - A private university in Davenport.
- Upper Iowa University – A satellite campus in Bettendorf.
- Western Illinois University-Quad Cities – The only public, four-year university in the Quad Cities region. The campus is located in Moline along the Mississippi Riverfront at the former site of the 60,000-square-foot (5,600 m^{2}) John Deere Technical Site.

== Culture ==
Since 1916, the region has supported the Quad City Symphony Orchestra, which presents a year-round schedule of concerts at the Adler Theatre in Davenport and Centennial Hall in Rock Island. The Handel Oratorio Society, dating to 1880, is the second-oldest organization of its kind in the nation and presents annual performances of "Messiah" along with another major work for choir and orchestra. The Augustana Choir, founded at Rock Island's Augustana College in 1934, is one of the nation's leading collegiate choruses. Major outdoor summer music festivals include the Bix Beiderbecke Memorial Jazz Festival, Mississippi Valley Blues Festival, and River Roots Live.

The Quad Cities' three traditional community theaters – Playcrafters Barn Theatre (founded in 1920, comedies and dramas) and Quad City Music Guild (1948, musicals) in Moline, and Genesius guild (1957, outdoor Shakespeare and Greek comedies and tragedies) in Rock Island – were joined in 1976 by Circa '21 Dinner Playhouse, a professional dinner theater in downtown Rock Island's historic Fort Theatre. Ballet is performed at Ballet Quad Cities. ComedySportz provides improv comedy. Bluebox Limited is a Bettendorf-based film production company, and many outside productions companies have filmed movies in the Quad Cities in recent years. Historic buildings and sites listed on state and the National Register of Historic Places interpret the history of people's settlement and lives in the area.

== Media ==
The Quad Cities is the 151st largest radio market in the United States. It is ranked 97th by Nielsen Media Research for the 2008–09 television season with 309,600 television households.

The area is served by over 13 commercial radio stations, 8 non-commercial radio stations, 3 low power FM radio stations, 8 TV stations and 3 daily newspapers.

In 2012, the Mississippi Valley Fair that is held in Davenport served as the film location for Rodney Atkins' music video "Just Wanna Rock N' Roll".

Also in 2012, the PBS Frontline documentary Poor Kids was filmed in and around the Quad Cities showing poverty from a child's perspective.

== Transportation ==
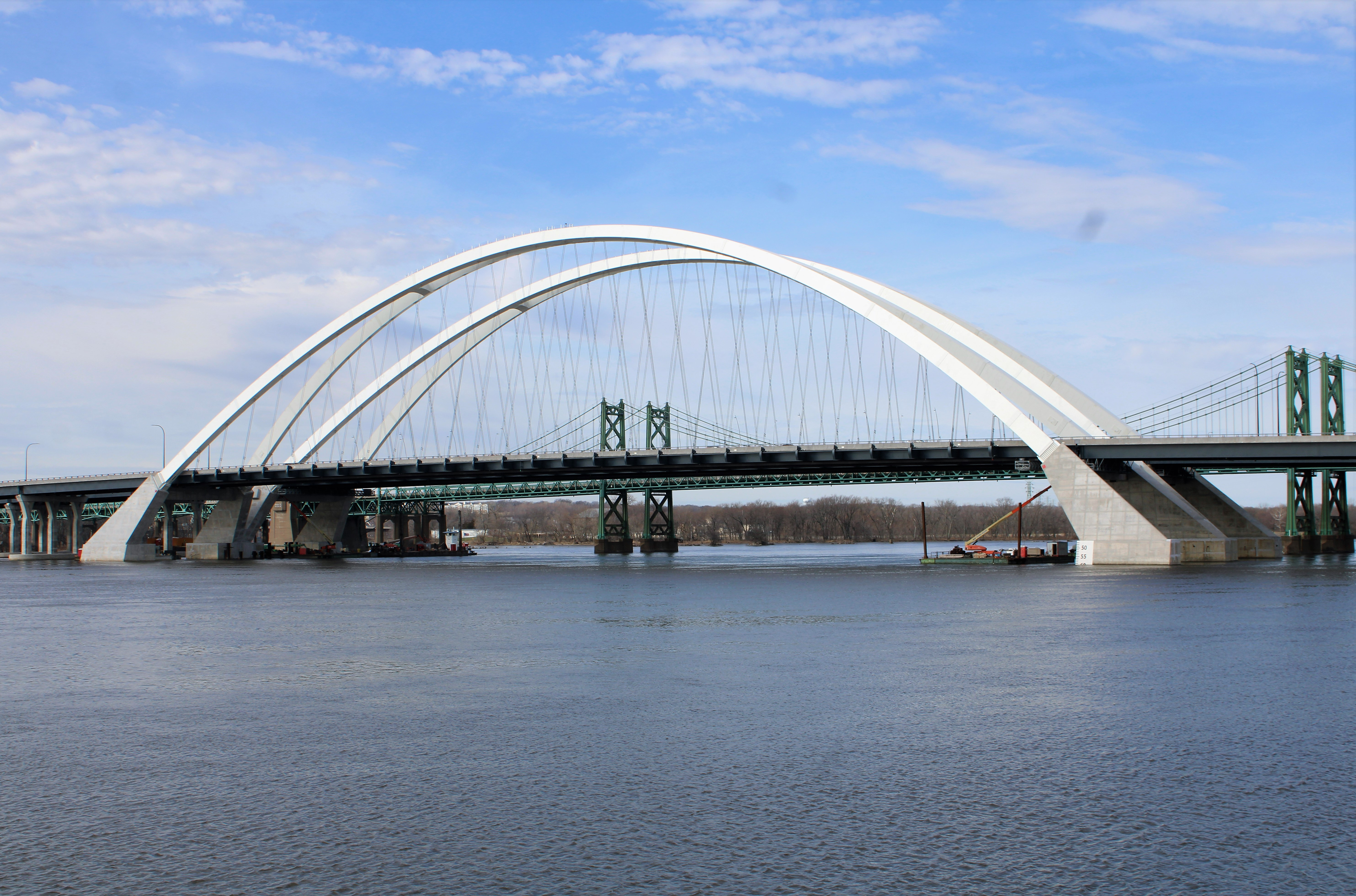
The I-74 Bridge, connecting Bettendorf, Iowa, and Moline, Illinois, is located near the geographic center of the Quad Cities.

Four interstate highways serve the Quad Cities: Interstate 80, Interstate 280, Interstate 74 serve both states while Interstate 88 serves just Illinois. United States highways include U.S. Route 6 and U.S. Route 67 which run through both Iowa and Illinois, while U.S. Route 61 serves just Iowa and U.S. Route 150 serves just Illinois. A total of five bridges accessible by automobiles connect Iowa with Illinois in the Quad Cities across the Mississippi River. The Fred Schwengel Memorial Bridge carries Interstate 80 and connects Le Claire, Iowa, with Rapids City, Illinois. Continuing downstream, the I-74 Bridge connects Bettendorf, Iowa, with Moline, Illinois, and is the busiest bridge with an average of 70,400 cars a day. The Government Bridge connects Downtown Davenport with the Rock Island Arsenal. Three bridges connect Davenport with Rock Island, Illinois; The Rock Island Centennial Bridge, The Crescent Rail Bridge, and the furthest downstream bridge, the Sergeant John F. Baker, Jr. Bridge which carries I-280.

Several state highways also serve the area. Iowa Highway 22 is on Davenport's southwest side and runs west through the county, while Iowa Highway 130 runs along Northwest Boulevard on Davenport's north edge. Illinois Route 5 (John Deere Road) runs from Rock Island east till it runs into Interstate 88. Illinois Route 92 runs along the Mississippi River, while Illinois Route 84 runs along the east side of Rock Island County. Illinois Route 192 connects Highway 92 with Illinois Route 94 near Taylor Ridge. The Chicago – Kansas City Expressway also serves the area along Interstates 74, 80, and 88.

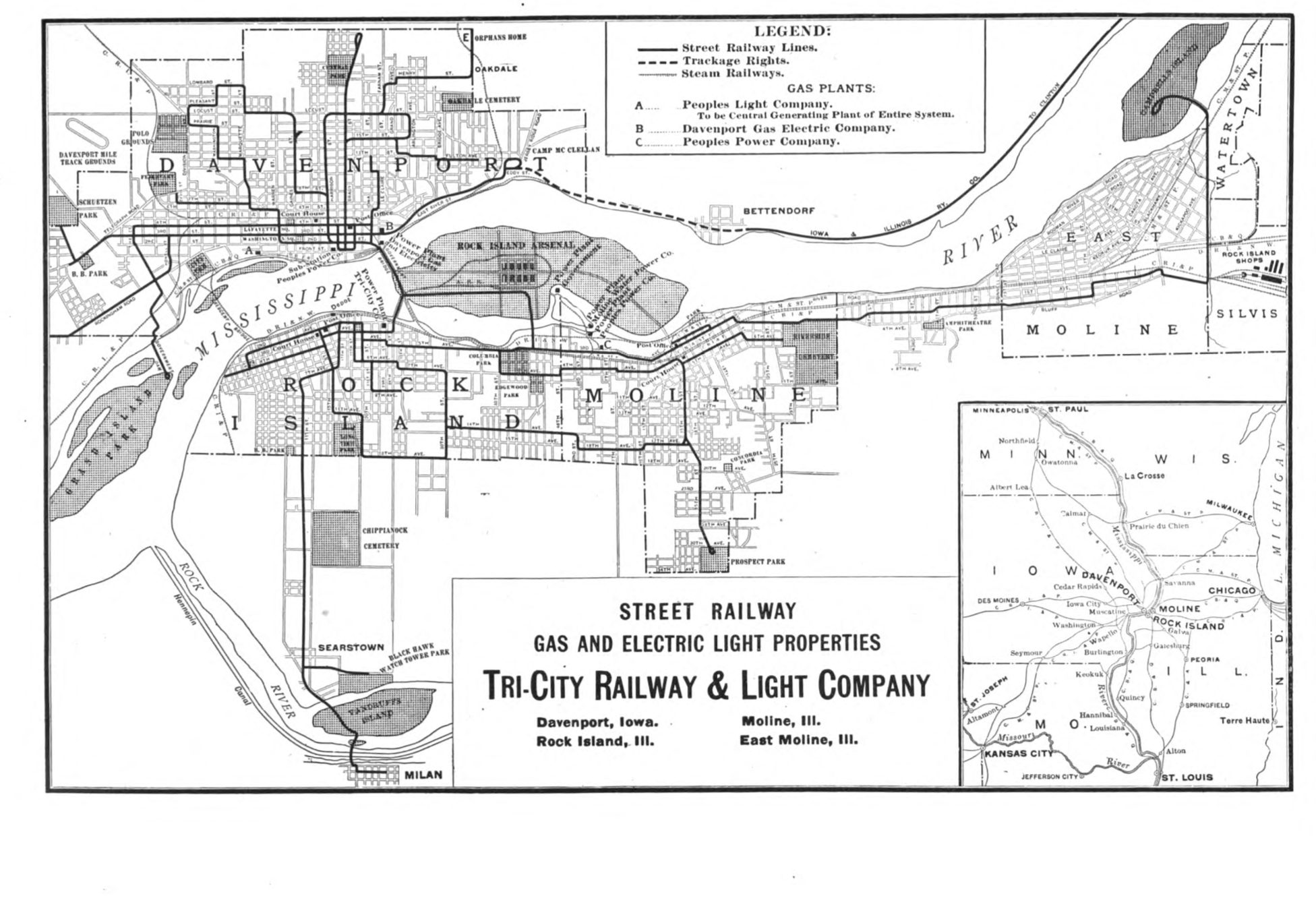
Map of Tri-City Railway and Light Company, Davenport Iowa Rock Island Illinois Moline Illinois and East Moline Illinois c 1907

There are three transit operators in the Quad Cities with limited interconnection between them. Rock Island County Metropolitan Mass Transit District (Quad Cities MetroLINK) serves the Illinois cities of Rock Island, Moline, East Moline, Milan, Silvis, Carbon Cliff, Hampton and Colona. It has 12 routes and a fleet of about 52 buses. It operates a river craft during summer months. In Iowa, Davenport Citibus has 10 fixed routes and operates 20 buses, seven days a week and Bettendorf Transit operates three routes, Monday–Saturday, and has eight buses.

Intercity bus service to the Quad Cities is provided by Burlington Trailways and Greyhound Lines.

Amtrak currently does not serve the Quad Cities. The closest station is about 50 miles (80 km) away in Galesburg, Illinois. In 2008, United States Senators Tom Harkin, Chuck Grassley, Dick Durbin, and Barack Obama sent a letter to Amtrak asking them to begin plans to bring rail service to the Quad Cities. In October 2010, a $230 million federal fund was announced that will bring Amtrak service to the Quad Cities, with a new line running from Moline to Chicago. They hoped to have the line completed in 2015, and offer two round trips daily to Chicago.

In December 2011, the federal government awarded $177 million in funding for the Amtrak connection. Budgetary and logistical issues have delayed the completion of all necessary track improvements, but the project is still in development. The multi-modal Moline Q Station building was completed in early 2018, with the attached Westin Element hotel opening in February. When the full project is completed, it will establish passenger rail through the Quad Cities, for the first time since the 1970s.

The Quad Cities is served by the Quad Cities International Airport, Illinois' third-busiest airport, located in Moline. The airport is marketed as a regional alternative to the larger airports in Chicago, nearly 200 miles (320 km) away. The smaller Davenport Municipal Airport is the home of the Quad City Air Show.

== Sports ==
From 1907 to 1926, Rock Island was home to the NFL's Rock Island Independents. The franchise was a charter member of the National Football League (NFL) in 1920. The first NFL game ever was played by the Independents at Douglas Park in September 1920. Football legend Jim Thorpe was a member of the team in 1924.

The Tri-Cities Blackhawks, named in honor of the Sauk war chief Black Hawk, was the next top-level professional sports franchise. The club played in the National Basketball League (NBL) from 1946 until its merger in 1949 with the Basketball Association of America to become the National Basketball Association (NBA). Hall of famer Red Auerbach coached the Blackhawks during their first NBA season.

After the 1950–51 basketball season, the team moved to Milwaukee, where they were renamed the Hawks. After additional moves to St. Louis and Atlanta, the team is now the Atlanta Hawks.

Professional basketball returned to the Quad Cities during the 1980s and 1990s with the Quad City Thunder of the Continental Basketball Association. The CBA served as the NBA's premier developmental league and produced many highly regarded NBA stars. From 1987 through the 1992–93 season, the Thunder played at Wharton Field House in Moline. Starting with the 1993–94 season, the team played at The MARK of the Quad Cities (now the Vibrant Arena at The MARK). After the CBA folded in 2001, the Thunder franchise ceased operations permanently. Vibrant Arena at The MARK occasionally hosts NCAA Division I college basketball conference tournaments as well as NBA and NHL exhibitions.

The Quad Cities has hosted minor league baseball teams since the Davenport Brown Stockings first played in 1878. The Rock Island Islanders and Moline Plowboys each fielded teams for many seasons. The Islanders began play in 1901 and played primarily at Douglas Park. The Plowboys were founded in 1914. Their home was Browning Field.

The Davenport franchise has been a member of the Midwest League since 1960. They have played at Modern Woodmen Park since 1931. Today, the Quad Cities River Bandits are High Class A affiliate of the Kansas City Royals

The PGA Tour makes an annual stop in the Quad Cities. The golf tournament is currently known as the John Deere Classic. It has drawn dozens of top PGA players over the years, including Tiger Woods, Vijay Singh, and Payne Stewart.

The Quad Cities Marathon has run annually in late September since 1998. Roughly 400-500 participants race through the four cities, beginning and ending in Moline. The race weekend also offers a half marathon and a 5K as well as races for children. Kenyan Kiplangat Terer holds the men's record with a 2:14:04, run in 2013. Kenyan Damaris Areba holds the woman's record at 2:30:29, from her 2022 win.

=== Sports teams ===
Club	Sport	League	Venue	Established	Championships
Quad Cities River Bandits	Baseball	Midwest League	Modern Woodmen Park	1960	6
Quad City Steamwheelers	Indoor football	IFL	Vibrant Arena at The MARK	2017	0
Quad City Storm	Ice hockey	SPHL	Vibrant Arena at The MARK	2018	0

- Quad City River Bandits is a Class A Midwest League minor league baseball team in Davenport. Their home games are played at Modern Woodmen Park, formerly John O'Donnell Stadium. The Davenport team has existed under a variety of names and Major League Baseball team affiliations since 1901. The River Bandits are currently affiliated with the Kansas City Royals.
- Quad City Mallards were an ice hockey team that played from 2009 to 2018 with home games held at the Vibrant Arena at The MARK in Moline. The new Mallards replaced the former Quad City Flames AHL team which played from 2007 to 2009. The original Mallards played in the United Hockey League from 1995 to 2007.
- The Quad City Storm was launched for the 2018–19 season in the Southern Professional Hockey League.
- The Quad City Steamwheelers were an AF2 arena football franchise that also played at the Vibrant Arena at The MARK. The Steamwheelers won the league's title game, the ArenaCup, in 2000 and 2001. After the AF2 league folded following its 2009 season, the Steamwheelers also ceased operations.
- A new Quad City Steamwheelers organization launched for the 2018 season in Champions Indoor Football and then moved to the Indoor Football League for 2019.
- Quad City Silverbacks were a professional mixed martial arts team competing in the now-defunct International Fight League. Home matches took place at the Vibrant Arena at The MARK.
- Pat Miletich formed and based a mixed martial arts gym and fight team, Miletich Fighting Systems, in the Quad Cities. Miletich Fighting Systems is among MMA's first 'super-camps', and housed many of the consensus greatest fighters of the early 2000s, such as Jens Pulver, Matt Hughes, Robbie Lawler, Tim Sylvia, and Jeremy Horn, among others.
- The Quad City Riverhawks was a PBL (Premier Basketball League) team. They played home games at Wharton Field House in Moline during the 2008 season. They ended with that season. Previously, the Quad City Thunder were a CBA team playing in the late 1980s thru 2000, first at Wharton and then at The Mark.
- The Quad City Raiders are a semi-professional minor league football team that was formed in 2011 to serve the Quad City area. The Raiders play in the MidStates Football League and have reached the semi-finals in the league playoffs each season.

=== See also ===
- Mississippi Athletic Conference for Iowa high school sports, and Western Big 6 Conference for high school sports in Illinois.
- Quad Cities International Airport

== See also ==
- African Americans in Davenport, Iowa
- Wild Dog (character)
- Quad City-style pizza
- List of tallest buildings in the Quad Cities
- Twin cities#Quad cities
