= Lynn Township, Henry County, Illinois =

Lynn Township
- Township
- Location in Henry County

- Henry County's location in Illinois
- Coordinates: 41°16′36″N 90°22′18″W
- Country: United States
- State: Illinois
- County: Henry
- Established: November 4, 1856

Area
  - Total: 36.30 sq mi (94.0 km^{2})
  - Land: 36.27 sq mi (93.9 km^{2})
  - Water: 0.04 sq mi (0.10 km^{2}) 0.10%
- Elevation: 679 ft (207 m)

Population (2020)
  - Total: 763
  - Density: 21.0/sq mi (8.12/km^{2})
- Time zone: UTC-6 (CST)
  - Summer (DST): UTC-5 (CDT)
- ZIP codes: 61262, 61273, 61413, 61468
- FIPS code: 17-073-45304

Lynn Township is one of twenty-four townships in Henry County, Illinois, USA. As of the 2020 census, its population was 763 and it contained 311 housing units. Lynn changed its name originally from Linn Grove Township to Lynnville Township on April 13, 1857, and then again from Lynnville to Lynn on an unknown date.

== Geography ==
According to the 2021 census gazetteer files, Lynn Township has a total area of 36.30 square miles (94.02 km^{2}), of which 36.27 square miles (93.94 km^{2}) (or 99.90%) is land and 0.04 square miles (0.10 km^{2}) (or 0.10%) is water.

=== Unincorporated towns ===
- Lynn Center at 41.295869°N 90.357904°W
- Ophiem at 41.252536°N 90.387627°W

(This list is based on USGS data and may include former settlements.)

=== Adjacent townships ===
- Western Township (north)
- Osco Township (northeast)
- Andover Township (east)
- Clover Township (southeast)
- Oxford Township (south)
- Rivoli Township, Mercer County (southwest)
- Richland Grove Township, Mercer County (west)
- Rural Township, Rock Island County (northwest)

=== Cemeteries ===
The township contains these two cemeteries: Lynn Center and Swedona.

=== Major highways ===
- Interstate 74
- U.S. Route 150
- Illinois Route 81

== Demographics ==
As of the 2020 census there were 763 people, 310 households, and 256 families residing in the township. The population density was 21.02 inhabitants per square mile (8.12/km^{2}). There were 311 housing units at an average density of 8.57 per square mile (3.31/km^{2}). The racial makeup of the township was 93.32% White, 0.26% African American, 0.00% Native American, 0.52% Asian, 0.00% Pacific Islander, 0.52% from other races, and 5.37% from two or more races. Hispanic or Latino of any race were 3.80% of the population.

There were 310 households, out of which 40.00% had children under the age of 18 living with them, 65.81% were married couples living together, 12.90% had a female householder with no spouse present, and 17.42% were non-families. 13.90% of all households were made up of individuals, and 5.50% had someone living alone who was 65 years of age or older. The average household size was 2.68 and the average family size was 2.95.

The township's age distribution consisted of 25.5% under the age of 18, 2.9% from 18 to 24, 24.8% from 25 to 44, 27.8% from 45 to 64, and 19.1% who were 65 years of age or older. The median age was 42.1 years. For every 100 females, there were 93.5 males. For every 100 females age 18 and over, there were 98.1 males.

The median income for a household in the township was $77,300, and the median income for a family was $76,200. Males had a median income of $51,576 versus $52,368 for females. The per capita income for the township was $33,558. About 9.8% of families and 11.9% of the population were below the poverty line, including 20.8% of those under age 18 and 6.9% of those age 65 or over.

Historical population
Census	Pop.	Note	%±
2000	714		—
2010	745		4.3%
2020	763		2.4%
U.S. Decennial Census

== School districts ==
- Alwood Community Unit School District 225
- Orion Community Unit School District 223

== Political districts ==
- Illinois's 17th congressional district
- State House District 71
- State Senate District 36
