= Andover Township, Henry County, Illinois =

Andover Township
- Township
- Location in Henry County

- Henry County's location in Illinois
- Coordinates: 41°17′15″N 90°15′42″W
- Country: United States
- State: Illinois
- County: Henry
- Established: November 4, 1856

Area
  - Total: 36.56 sq mi (94.7 km^{2})
  - Land: 36.56 sq mi (94.7 km^{2})
  - Water: 0 sq mi (0 km^{2}) 0%
- Elevation: 801 ft (244 m)

Population (2020)
  - Total: 881
  - Density: 24.1/sq mi (9.30/km^{2})
- Time zone: UTC-6 (CST)
  - Summer (DST): UTC-5 (CDT)
- ZIP codes: 61233, 61238, 61262, 61274
- FIPS code: 17-073-01504

Andover Township is one of twenty-four townships in Henry County, Illinois, USA. As of the 2020 census, its population was 881 and it contained 399 housing units.

== Geography ==
According to the 2021 census gazetteer files, Andover Township has a total area of 36.56 square miles (94.69 km^{2}), all land.

=== Cities, towns, villages ===
- Andover

=== Adjacent townships ===
- Osco Township (north)
- Munson Township (northeast)
- Cambridge Township (east)
- Weller Township (southeast)
- Clover Township (south)
- Lynn Township (west)
- Western Township (northwest)

=== Cemeteries ===
The township contains these three cemeteries: Andover Township, Presbyterian and Rose Dale.

=== Major highways ===
- Illinois Route 81

=== Airports and landing strips ===
- Boyd Wheatleys Farm Airport
- Wheatley Landing Strip

== Demographics ==
As of the 2020 census there were 881 people, 264 households, and 214 families residing in the township. The population density was 24.09 inhabitants per square mile (9.30/km^{2}). There were 399 housing units at an average density of 10.91 per square mile (4.21/km^{2}). The racial makeup of the township was 95.01% White, 0.00% African American, 0.23% Native American, 0.00% Asian, 0.00% Pacific Islander, 0.68% from other races, and 4.09% from two or more races. Hispanic or Latino of any race were 1.48% of the population.

There were 264 households, out of which 31.80% had children under the age of 18 living with them, 70.83% were married couples living together, 7.95% had a female householder with no spouse present, and 18.94% were non-families. 17.00% of all households were made up of individuals, and 8.30% had someone living alone who was 65 years of age or older. The average household size was 2.53 and the average family size was 2.84.

The township's age distribution consisted of 23.7% under the age of 18, 3.9% from 18 to 24, 25.7% from 25 to 44, 22.1% from 45 to 64, and 24.6% who were 65 years of age or older. The median age was 43.6 years. For every 100 females, there were 106.2 males. For every 100 females age 18 and over, there were 90.3 males.

The median income for a household in the township was $60,417, and the median income for a family was $75,288. Males had a median income of $49,875 versus $27,800 for females. The per capita income for the township was $27,694. No families and 0.8% of the population were below the poverty line, including none of those under age 18 and none of those age 65 or over.

Historical population
Census	Pop.	Note	%±
2000	927		—
2010	954		2.9%
2020	881		−7.7%
U.S. Decennial Census

== School districts ==
- Alwood Community Unit School District 225
- Cambridge Community Unit School District 227
- Orion Community Unit School District 223

== Political districts ==
- Illinois's 17th congressional district
- State House District 71
- State Senate District 36
