= Osco Township, Henry County, Illinois =

Osco Township
- Township
- Location in Henry County

- Henry County's location in Illinois
- Coordinates: 41°22′21″N 90°15′25″W
- Country: United States
- State: Illinois
- County: Henry
- Established: November 4, 1856

Area
  - Total: 36.48 sq mi (94.5 km^{2})
  - Land: 36.48 sq mi (94.5 km^{2})
  - Water: 0 sq mi (0 km^{2}) 0%
- Elevation: 751 ft (229 m)

Population (2020)
  - Total: 434
  - Density: 11.9/sq mi (4.59/km^{2})
- Time zone: UTC-6 (CST)
  - Summer (DST): UTC-5 (CDT)
- ZIP codes: 61238, 61254, 61273, 61274
- FIPS code: 17-073-56809

Osco Township is one of twenty-four townships in Henry County, Illinois, USA. As of the 2020 census, its population was 434 and it contained 190 housing units. Osco changed its name from Essex Township on April 13, 1857.

== Geography ==
According to the 2021 census gazetteer files, Osco Township has a total area of 36.48 square miles (94.48 km^{2}), all land.

=== Unincorporated towns ===
- Morristown at 41.396424°N 90.298735°W
- Osco at 41.347813°N 90.280401°W

(This list is based on USGS data and may include former settlements.)

=== Adjacent townships ===
- Edford Township (north)
- Geneseo Township (northeast)
- Munson Township (east)
- Cambridge Township (southeast)
- Andover Township (south)
- Lynn Township (southwest)
- Western Township (west)
- Colona Township (northwest)

=== Cemeteries ===
The township contains these two cemeteries: Grace Episcopal and Morristown.

== Demographics ==
As of the 2020 census there were 434 people, 151 households, and 129 families residing in the township. The population density was 11.90 inhabitants per square mile (4.59/km^{2}). There were 190 housing units at an average density of 5.21 per square mile (2.01/km^{2}). The racial makeup of the township was 95.16% White, 0.92% African American, 0.46% Native American, 0.23% Asian, 0.00% Pacific Islander, 0.46% from other races, and 2.76% from two or more races. Hispanic or Latino of any race were 2.53% of the population.

There were 151 households, out of which 20.50% had children under the age of 18 living with them, 70.86% were married couples living together, 6.62% had a female householder with no spouse present, and 14.57% were non-families. 14.60% of all households were made up of individuals, and 10.60% had someone living alone who was 65 years of age or older. The average household size was 2.23 and the average family size was 2.43.

The township's age distribution consisted of 10.1% under the age of 18, 9.2% from 18 to 24, 11.1% from 25 to 44, 38.5% from 45 to 64, and 31.3% who were 65 years of age or older. The median age was 57.8 years. For every 100 females, there were 114.0 males. For every 100 females age 18 and over, there were 122.1 males.

The median income for a household in the township was $102,813, and the median income for a family was $107,589. Males had a median income of $54,688 versus $41,375 for females. The per capita income for the township was $45,382. No families and 1.8% of the population were below the poverty line, including none of those under age 18 and none of those age 65 or over.

Historical population
Census	Pop.	Note	%±
2000	528		—
2010	459		−13.1%
2020	434		−5.4%
U.S. Decennial Census

== School districts ==
- Cambridge Community Unit School District 227
- Geneseo Community Unit School District 228
- Orion Community Unit School District 223

== Political districts ==
- Illinois's 14th congressional district
- State House District 71
- State Senate District 36
