= Western Township, Henry County, Illinois =

Western Township
- Township
- Location in Henry County

- Henry County's location in Illinois
- Coordinates: 41°22′21″N 90°22′38″W
- Country: United States
- State: Illinois
- County: Henry
- Established: November 4, 1856

Area
  - Total: 35.48 sq mi (91.9 km^{2})
  - Land: 35.48 sq mi (91.9 km^{2})
  - Water: 0 sq mi (0 km^{2}) 0%
- Elevation: 761 ft (232 m)

Population (2020)
  - Total: 2,974
  - Density: 83.82/sq mi (32.36/km^{2})
- Time zone: UTC-6 (CST)
  - Summer (DST): UTC-5 (CDT)
- ZIP codes: 61240, 61262, 61273, 61274
- FIPS code: 17-073-80190

Western Township is one of twenty-four townships in Henry County, Illinois, USA. As of the 2020 census, its population was 2,974 and it contained 1,247 housing units. Western changed its name from Orion Township on April 13, 1857.

== Geography ==
According to the 2021 census gazetteer files, Western Township has a total area of 35.48 square miles (91.89 km^{2}), all land.

=== Cities, towns, villages ===
- Orion

=== Unincorporated towns ===
- Brook Lawn at 41.412535°N 90.42763°W
- Sunny Hill at 41.398924°N 90.415963°W
- Sunny Hill Estates at 41.396424°N 90.429019°W
- Warner at 41.410313°N 90.375961°W

(This list is based on USGS data and may include former settlements.)

=== Adjacent townships ===
- Colona Township (north)
- Edford Township (northeast)
- Osco Township (east)
- Andover Township (southeast)
- Lynn Township (south)
- Richland Grove Township, Mercer County (southwest)
- Rural Township, Rock Island County (west)
- Coal Valley Township, Rock Island County (northwest)

=== Cemeteries ===
The township contains these two cemeteries: Orion Lutheran and Western Township.

=== Major highways ===
- Interstate 74
- U.S. Route 150

=== Airports and landing strips ===
- Hughes RLA Airport

== Demographics ==
As of the 2020 census there were 2,974 people, 1,129 households, and 805 families residing in the township. The population density was 83.83 inhabitants per square mile (32.37/km^{2}). There were 1,247 housing units at an average density of 35.15 per square mile (13.57/km^{2}). The racial makeup of the township was 93.88% White, 0.47% African American, 0.24% Native American, 0.27% Asian, 0.00% Pacific Islander, 0.64% from other races, and 4.51% from two or more races. Hispanic or Latino of any race were 3.09% of the population.

There were 1,129 households, out of which 37.40% had children under the age of 18 living with them, 57.04% were married couples living together, 11.25% had a female householder with no spouse present, and 28.70% were non-families. 24.70% of all households were made up of individuals, and 12.20% had someone living alone who was 65 years of age or older. The average household size was 2.63 and the average family size was 3.13.

The township's age distribution consisted of 25.2% under the age of 18, 7.8% from 18 to 24, 26.4% from 25 to 44, 24.8% from 45 to 64, and 15.8% who were 65 years of age or older. The median age was 38.2 years. For every 100 females, there were 111.1 males. For every 100 females age 18 and over, there were 95.3 males.

The median income for a household in the township was $79,327, and the median income for a family was $88,199. Males had a median income of $53,646 versus $37,011 for females. The per capita income for the township was $35,053. About 0.9% of families and 2.1% of the population were below the poverty line, including 0.0% of those under age 18 and 3.8% of those age 65 or over.

Historical population
Census	Pop.	Note	%±
2000	2,920		—
2010	3,053		4.6%
2020	2,974		−2.6%
U.S. Decennial Census

== School districts ==
- Orion Community Unit School District 223

== Political districts ==
- Illinois's 14th congressional district
- State House District 71
- State Senate District 36
