= Oxford Township, Henry County, Illinois =

Oxford Township
- Township
- Location in Henry County

- Henry County's location in Illinois
- Coordinates: 41°11′40″N 90°22′43″W
- Country: United States
- State: Illinois
- County: Henry
- Established: November 4, 1856

Area
  - Total: 35.64 sq mi (92.3 km^{2})
  - Land: 35.60 sq mi (92.2 km^{2})
  - Water: 0.04 sq mi (0.10 km^{2}) 0.12%
- Elevation: 804 ft (245 m)

Population (2020)
  - Total: 1,176
  - Density: 33.03/sq mi (12.75/km^{2})
- Time zone: UTC-6 (CST)
  - Summer (DST): UTC-5 (CDT)
- ZIP codes: 61262, 61413, 61465, 61468
- FIPS code: 17-073-57108

Oxford Township is one of twenty-four townships in Henry County, Illinois, USA. As of the 2020 census, its population was 1,176 and it contained 543 housing units.

== Geography ==
According to the 2021 census gazetteer files, Oxford Township has a total area of 35.64 square miles (92.31 km^{2}), of which 35.60 square miles (92.20 km^{2}) (or 99.88%) is land and 0.04 square miles (0.10 km^{2}) (or 0.12%) is water.

=== Cities, towns, villages ===
- Alpha
- Woodhull (partial)

=== Extinct towns ===
- Oxford at 41.173648°N 90.433185°W

(These towns are listed as "historical" by the USGS.)

=== Adjacent townships ===
- Lynn Township (north)
- Clover Township (east)
- Ontario Township, Knox County (southeast)
- Rio Township, Knox County (south)
- North Henderson Township, Mercer County (southwest)
- Rivoli Township, Mercer County (west)
- Richland Grove Township, Mercer County (northwest)

=== Cemeteries ===
The township contains these four cemeteries: Alpha, Oxford, Saint Johns and Summit Level.

=== Major highways ===
- Interstate 74
- U.S. Route 150
- Illinois Route 17

=== Lakes ===
- Crescent Lake
- Skona Lake

== Demographics ==
As of the 2020 census there were 1,176 people, 476 households, and 339 families residing in the township. The population density was 33.00 inhabitants per square mile (12.74/km^{2}). There were 543 housing units at an average density of 15.24 per square mile (5.88/km^{2}). The racial makeup of the township was 95.41% White, 0.43% African American, 0.00% Native American, 0.26% Asian, 0.00% Pacific Islander, 0.34% from other races, and 3.57% from two or more races. Hispanic or Latino of any race were 2.72% of the population.

There were 476 households, out of which 27.50% had children under the age of 18 living with them, 64.92% were married couples living together, 3.36% had a female householder with no spouse present, and 28.78% were non-families. 25.60% of all households were made up of individuals, and 12.80% had someone living alone who was 65 years of age or older. The average household size was 2.26 and the average family size was 2.69.

The township's age distribution consisted of 20.6% under the age of 18, 2.3% from 18 to 24, 26.4% from 25 to 44, 29.6% from 45 to 64, and 21.1% who were 65 years of age or older. The median age was 45.5 years. For every 100 females, there were 116.7 males. For every 100 females age 18 and over, there were 125.6 males.

The median income for a household in the township was $68,625, and the median income for a family was $84,375. Males had a median income of $53,587 versus $32,171 for females. The per capita income for the township was $35,340. About 2.9% of families and 7.5% of the population were below the poverty line, including 15.7% of those under age 18 and 1.3% of those age 65 or over.

Historical population
Census	Pop.	Note	%±
2000	1,172		—
2010	1,213		3.5%
2020	1,176		−3.1%
U.S. Decennial Census

== School districts ==
- Alwood Community Unit School District 225

== Political districts ==
- Illinois's 17th congressional district
- State House District 74
- State Senate District 37
