= Edford Township, Henry County, Illinois =

Edford Township
- Township
- Location in Henry County

- Henry County's location in Illinois
- Coordinates: 41°26′53″N 90°15′33″W
- Country: United States
- State: Illinois
- County: Henry
- Established: November 4, 1856

Area
  - Total: 27.43 sq mi (71.0 km^{2})
  - Land: 27.38 sq mi (70.9 km^{2})
  - Water: 0.05 sq mi (0.13 km^{2}) 0.19%
- Elevation: 659 ft (201 m)

Population (2020)
  - Total: 685
  - Density: 25.0/sq mi (9.66/km^{2})
- Time zone: UTC-6 (CST)
  - Summer (DST): UTC-5 (CDT)
- ZIP codes: 61241, 61254
- FIPS code: 17-073-22476

Edford Township is one of twenty-four townships in Henry County, Illinois, USA. As of the 2020 census, its population was 685 and it contained 278 housing units.

== Geography ==
According to the 2021 census gazetteer files, Edford Township has a total area of 27.43 square miles (71.04 km^{2}), of which 27.38 square miles (70.91 km^{2}) (or 99.81%) is land and 0.05 square miles (0.13 km^{2}) (or 0.19%) is water.

- Green River at 41.475590°N 90.319292°W

(This list is based on USGS data and may include former settlements.)

=== Adjacent townships ===
- Hanna Township (north)
- Geneseo Township (east)
- Osco Township (south)
- Western Township (southwest)
- Colona Township (west)

=== Cemeteries ===
The township contains Edford Cemetery.

=== Major highways ===
- Interstate 80
- U.S. Route 6

=== Landmarks ===
- Hennepin Canal Parkway State Park (west quarter)

== Demographics ==
As of the 2020 census there were 685 people, 320 households, and 279 families residing in the township. The population density was 24.97 inhabitants per square mile (9.64/km^{2}). There were 278 housing units at an average density of 10.14 per square mile (3.92/km^{2}). The racial makeup of the township was 91.97% White, 0.88% African American, 0.15% Native American, 0.58% Asian, 0.15% Pacific Islander, 1.17% from other races, and 5.11% from two or more races. Hispanic or Latino of any race were 5.26% of the population.

There were 320 households, out of which 46.60% had children under the age of 18 living with them, 80.94% were married couples living together, 3.13% had a female householder with no spouse present, and 12.81% were non-families. 12.80% of all households were made up of individuals, and 10.00% had someone living alone who was 65 years of age or older. The average household size was 2.88 and the average family size was 3.15.

The township's age distribution consisted of 28.5% under the age of 18, 10.4% from 18 to 24, 22.4% from 25 to 44, 22.8% from 45 to 64, and 15.9% who were 65 years of age or older. The median age was 40.3 years. For every 100 females, there were 91.3 males. For every 100 females age 18 and over, there were 112.3 males.

The median income for a household in the township was $97,024, and the median income for a family was $107,083. Males had a median income of $75,341 versus $26,029 for females. The per capita income for the township was $41,272. About 11.5% of families and 12.3% of the population were below the poverty line, including 17.9% of those under age 18 and 6.8% of those age 65 or over.

Historical population
Census	Pop.	Note	%±
2000	715		—
2010	667		−6.7%
2020	685		2.7%
U.S. Decennial Census

== School districts ==
- Geneseo Community Unit School District 228

== Political districts ==
- Illinois's 14th congressional district
- State House District 71
- State Senate District 36
