= Juanita Breckenridge Bates =

American Congregationalist minister (1860–1946)

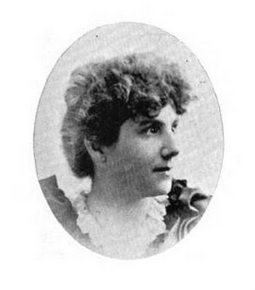
- Born: December 31, 1860; Hopewell, Illinois, US
- Died: June 11, 1946 (aged 58); Ithaca, New York, US
- Education: Wheaton College, Oberlin College
- Occupations: Minister, Suffragist
- Spouse: Frederick E. Bates (m. 1893)

Juanita Breckenridge Bates (December 31, 1860 - June 11, 1946) was an American Congregationalist minister, her application being the test case to determine the policy of the denomination. She was the first woman to be awarded a Bachelor of Divinity degree from Oberlin College (1891), and Oberlin was the first school to award this degree. For decades, she was a community organizer in the women's suffrage movement.

== Early years and education ==
Juanita Breckenridge was born in Hopewell, Rivoli Township, Mercer County, Illinois on December 31, 1860. She was the daughter of Hugh and Mary (Watson) Breckenridge. Her father was a Methodist minister.

She was educated at Rock Island High School, Wheaton College (B.S.), and Oberlin College Theological Seminary (1891, B.D.). While at Oberlin, she was a member of Ladies' Literary Society.

== Career ==
=== Breckenridge ===
In Spring, 1890, she applied to the Cleveland Congregational Conference for a license to preach. Her case was made the test case to determine the policy of the denomination and the license was granted at the fall conference, 1890, after six months of discussion. She was ordained at Brookton, New York, on June 28, 1892. The ordination sermon was preached by her brother, Rev. W. W. Breckenridge, and the charge was given by the venerable Rev. Thomas K. Beecher. Brookton was the first charge of Rev. Annis F. Eastman, and the congregation was so pleased with her ministry that they called Breckenridge to succeed her.

=== Bates ===
On September 27, 1893, she married Hon. Frederick E. Bates in New Windsor, Illinois. At that time, she resigned from her Congregational Church position as she intended to visit her mother in the midwest.

Bates chaired the Suffrage Party in Ithaca, New York, and was a leader of Tompkins County, New York in New York state's campaign for woman suffrage. The city of Ithaca and Tompkins County carried for suffrage.

She was interested in Sabbath School, The Social Service League, Y.W.C.A. work, and both home and foreign mission work. She served as first vice-president of the Ithaca Political Study Club; was a member of Susquehanna Ministerial Association, New York State Congregational Conference; and was a director of New York State Federation of Women's Clubs, Ithaca Woman's Club, Political Study Club, City Federation of Women's Organizations of Ithaca.

== Personal life ==
She married Frederick Bates in 1893. He served as mayor of Ithaca in 1916. They had two children, Juanita and Abraham. Frederick died in 1922, and Bates managed the large estate left by her husband.

Bates died June 11, 1946, in Ithaca, and was buried in Lake View Cemetery.
