= Clover Township, Henry County, Illinois =

Clover Township
- Township
- Location in Henry County

- Henry County's location in Illinois
- Coordinates: 41°11′43″N 90°16′06″W
- Country: United States
- State: Illinois
- County: Henry
- Established: November 4, 1856

Area
  - Total: 34.94 sq mi (90.5 km^{2})
  - Land: 34.94 sq mi (90.5 km^{2})
  - Water: 0 sq mi (0 km^{2}) 0%
- Elevation: 748 ft (228 m)

Population (2020)
  - Total: 847
  - Density: 24.2/sq mi (9.36/km^{2})
- Time zone: UTC-6 (CST)
  - Summer (DST): UTC-5 (CDT)
- ZIP codes: 61238, 61262, 61413, 61414, 61490
- FIPS code: 17-073-15040

Clover Township is one of twenty-four townships in Henry County, Illinois, USA. As of the 2020 census, its population was 847 and it contained 424 housing units. Clover Township was originally known as Ashnelet Township, but was changed on an unknown date.

== Geography ==
According to the 2021 census gazetteer files, Clover Township has a total area of 34.94 square miles (90.49 km^{2}), all land.

=== Cities, towns, villages ===
- Woodhull (partial)

=== Adjacent townships ===
- Andover Township (north)
- Weller Township (east)
- Walnut Grove Township, Knox County (southeast)
- Ontario Township, Knox County (south)
- Rio Township, Knox County (southwest)
- Oxford Township (west)
- Lynn Township (northwest)

=== Cemeteries ===
The township contains these two cemeteries: Clover Chapel and Woodhull.

=== Major highways ===
- Illinois Route 17

== Demographics ==
As of the 2020 census there were 847 people, 369 households, and 251 families residing in the township. The population density was 24.24 inhabitants per square mile (9.36/km^{2}). There were 424 housing units at an average density of 12.14 per square mile (4.69/km^{2}). The racial makeup of the township was 94.57% White, 0.71% African American, 0.00% Native American, 0.00% Asian, 0.00% Pacific Islander, 0.59% from other races, and 4.13% from two or more races. Hispanic or Latino of any race were 1.89% of the population.

There were 369 households, out of which 20.30% had children under the age of 18 living with them, 58.54% were married couples living together, 4.34% had a female householder with no spouse present, and 31.98% were non-families. 23.30% of all households were made up of individuals, and 9.20% had someone living alone who was 65 years of age or older. The average household size was 2.36 and the average family size was 2.77.

The township's age distribution consisted of 17.0% under the age of 18, 8.0% from 18 to 24, 29.6% from 25 to 44, 22.4% from 45 to 64, and 23.0% who were 65 years of age or older. The median age was 43.1 years. For every 100 females, there were 110.9 males. For every 100 females age 18 and over, there were 124.5 males.

The median income for a household in the township was $57,292, and the median income for a family was $85,982. Males had a median income of $43,250 versus $34,750 for females. The per capita income for the township was $32,686. About 4.0% of families and 11.1% of the population were below the poverty line, including 13.4% of those under age 18 and 5.5% of those age 65 or over.

Historical population
Census	Pop.	Note	%±
2000	1,011		—
2010	938		−7.2%
2020	847		−9.7%
U.S. Decennial Census

== School districts ==
- Alwood Community Unit School District 225
- Cambridge Community Unit School District 227

== Political districts ==
- Illinois's 17th congressional district
- State House District 74
- State Senate District 37
