= Sears Seating =

Vehicle seating manufacturer

- Company type: Private
- Industry: Manufacturing
- Founded: 1855
- Headquarters: Davenport, Iowa, U.S.
- Key people: James Sears, CEO
- Products: Vehicle seating
- Number of employees: 600+
- Website: http://www.searsseating.com/

Sears Seating is an American producer of seating for agricultural, construction, and material handling equipment and heavy-duty, over-the-road trucks worldwide. It was founded in 1855 by Isaac Howe Sears, remains headquartered in Davenport, Iowa, and as of 2019, has over 600 employees in the Quad Cities.

Sears' customers include John Deere, CNH, Caterpillar, Bobcat, Hyster, Yale, Freightliner and Komatsu.

Early products included harnesses, saddles and other leather/canvas goods, predominantly for farmers. In 1947, the firm began to produce tractor seats, introducing innovative mechanical suspension for them 18 years later. Truck seat production began in 1981.

== Awards ==
- 2007 John Deere Partner-level Supplier and Supplier of the Year
