= Green River, Illinois =

- Unincorporated community
- Location within Illinois Location within the United States
- Coordinates: 41°28′32″N 90°19′09″W
- Country: USA
- State: Illinois
- County: Henry County
- Township: Edford Township
- Elevation: 181 m (594 ft)
- Time zone: UTC-6 (CST)
  - Summer (DST): UTC-5 (CDT)
- ZIP code: 61254
- GNIS feature ID: 409396

Green River is an unincorporated community in Edford Township, Henry County, Illinois, United States.

== Geography ==
Green River is located at 41°28′32″N 90°19′09″W at an elevation of 594 feet.

== See also ==
Green River the stream in Illinois.
