= African Americans in Davenport, Iowa =

Third-largest black community in Iowa

Total population
- 11,218 (2020)

African Americans in Davenport, Iowa, comprise the third largest black community in Iowa with a history that precedes the Civil War.

== Geography and demographics ==
The Quad-Cities, with Davenport as the largest member, has for years been one of five cities that have been home to a majority of the state's black population. The others are Des Moines, Cedar Rapids, Waterloo, Iowa City, and Coralville. According to the 2010 U.S. Census, these cities held 55.2% of Iowa's black population.

From the 2008 U.S. Census estimated population of 99,514, 9.2% (9,200 citizens) in the Davenport metro area identified as African-American. For comparison, the average African-American population in Iowa cities is 2.5%. In recent history, Davenport has been home to the third-largest, in absolute numbers and percentage, African-American community in Iowa, behind both Coralville (2,647 in 2019) and Waterloo (9,529 in 2000, 8,398 in 1980, 10,600 in 2019), and originally behind Des Moines (16,025 in 2000, 13,164 in 1980). In 2000, 9,093 (9.3%) of Davenport's population was African-American, up from 6,229 in 1980, and in 2019, it was 11,939 (11.67%).

The United States Census Bureau estimated that from 2005 to 2007, there was a larger black community in the Davenport: 11,300 persons or almost 12% of the city.

Black alone (non-Hispanic) population (2020)
| City | Population | Black pop | % Black |
|---|---|---|---|
| Des Moines | 214,133 | 24,538 | 11.46% |
| Davenport | 101,724 | 11,833 | 11.63% |
| Cedar Rapids | 137,710 | 14,153 | 10.28% |
| Waterloo | 67,314 | 12,031 | 17.87% |
| Iowa City | 74,828 | | |
| Dubuque | 59,667 | | |
| Sioux City | 85,797 | 4,931 | 5.75% |
| Coralville | 22,318 | | |
| State of Iowa | 3,190,369 | 129,321 | 4.05% |

== History ==
=== 19th century ===
African-Americans settled in Davenport as early as the 1830s. Iowa was a free territory; and a free state when it joined the Union late in 1846. Dred Scott, whose legal fight for freedom was ruled on in the 1857 Dred Scott Decision of the United States Supreme Court, lived with his family in Davenport as he followed his master to various military postings in the Midwest. Scott and his wife based their appeal for freedom on the fact that they had been held for extended periods of time in free states and territories, including Scott's stay with his master in Davenport in 1834–1836. An historic plaque was installed at the site of Scott's residence in Davenport.

There were two major periods of African-American migration to Davenport. In the years up to and including the Civil War and the second, the Great Migration of the first half of the 20th century. In the 19th century, African-Americans fleeing both slavery and the Civil War came to Davenport because it was a major port in a free territory on the Mississippi River. They found ports in Missouri, a slave state, too hostile even for free black migrants. In Davenport, white residents became agitated in meetings and newspaper petitions against continued African-American migration to the city were circulated.

On October 31, 1865, months after the Civil War, 700 members of the 60th U.S. Infantry Colored Regiment met at Camp McClellan in Davenport to rally for the right to vote and other civil rights. It was an early meeting in a campaign that resulted in an Iowa referendum in which voters granted the right to vote in 1868 to African-Americans. Alexander Clarke of Muscatine, elected to preside over the meeting, telling the audience, "[W]e have discharged our duty as soldiers in the defense of our country, [and] respectfully urge that it is the duty of Iowa to allow us the use of our votes at the polls ... [H]e who is worthy to be trusted with the musket can and ought to be trusted with the ballot."

=== Late 19th and early 20th centuries ===
A small black business district developed on Fifth Street, starting in 1884 when Linsey Pitts, a former slave from Missouri and a Civil War veteran, opened his saloon at 120 E. Fifth Street. He had previously worked as a laborer and barber. In the 1870s, about a half dozen black women ran prostitution businesses on Front Street and on the blocks east of Brady Street downtown. By 1886, Mattie Burke, who ran a combination saloon and house of prostitution (serving both blacks and whites), moved her business to 124 E. Fifth Street. In 1888, a city directory described her business as a restaurant, which would have complemented Pitts' saloon. Pitts' business did well. In 1890, Pitts' saloon was assessed at $340; the next year, $1,740. It also attracted other businesses to the area. By 1890, four Black businesses and households had moved to the same block and by 1900 there were 10, with Pitts' saloon acting as an "anchor" for the little business district. It faced the Chicago Rock Island & Peoria railroad tracks just east of Brady Street. The businesses were two blocks from the CRPI&P depot, from which Black dining-car workers, porters, and passengers might visit.

According to historian David Brodnax, African Americans in Davenport enjoyed a relative lack of "open violence" from the Civil War to the turn of the 20th century. But "several high-profile events—including a race riot, waves of hysteria following alleged rapes of white women by black men, a near lynching, and legal harassment of African-American activists—show that even the threat of violence was a tool of social control to maintain class and racial privilege." An established, middle-class black community mixed with other ethnic and social groups, including Southern, Midwestern, foreign-born, wealthy and poor whites, and more recent Southern migrants, "especially in the wharfs, bars and illegal enterprises along the waterfront, where interaction between the races was often greatest".

A description of African-Americans in Davenport was published in a chapter of Them was the Good Old Days, a 1922 book by William L. Purcell. This was a compilation and revision of material collected from newspaper columns in the Davenport Democrat newspaper. Written in humorous dialect, the book reminiscences about the "good old days", often without specifying the years involved and always with an eye toward amusing the reader. The chapter "Old Time Cullud Folks" mentions Linsey Pitts and gives short descriptions of various people, including John Hanover Warwick, a barber on Third Street who had four sons, one of whom left to become a minstrel; George Washington, a whitewasher and the first black man in the community to marry a white woman; Milton Howard, who worked at the federal arsenal and who learned several languages; Henry McGaw, who started a night janitor service for doctors and lawyers; Jake Busey, the first black person in Davenport to graduate from the public schools, and who had "a style of his own in jugglin' hard words that made the cullud folks gasp". Busey and his two brothers did not respond to racial insults with anger, according to the book, which said, "No sah! They'd just laugh at you," and they would sing a racist song with mock solemnity.

City officials in the 1910s commented on the visible segregation of Davenport, but contended that this was the result of self segregation.

In this period, the African-American population of Davenport was tiny: 569 counted in the 1910 census, from a total city population of 43,028. Although second in Iowa to Des Moines, it was much smaller than the capital's recorded community of 2,930.

At the beginning of the 20th century, labor unions were segregated in Davenport. When the American Federation of Labor Brotherhood of Leatherworkers went on strike against Davenport employers in 1904, the businesses recruited African Americans as scabs. In the wake of the failure of the strike, union leaders called on their members to reject segregation so that all workers could stand together.

=== Great Migration of the 20th century ===
The Great Black Migration of the first half of the 20th century, when a total of 1.5 million African Americans migrated out of the South to Northern and Midwestern industrial cities, resulted in settlement of such rural migrants in Davenport and other river towns.

According to John D. Baskerville of the University Northern Iowa, "The years between 1910 and 1920 marked the beginning of a major shift of the African-American population within the United States. The nation's African-American population shifted away from underdeveloped rural areas in the South to industrial centers in the cities, particularly in the North and the West."

"It has been estimated that nearly 500,000 to a million African-American men, women, and children 'left the South before, during, and shortly after the first World War, settling in urban areas such as New York, Chicago, Detroit and other areas in the North and Midwest. For example, Chicago's African-American population increased from 44,000 to 110,000 during this period." (Franklin and Moss 1994)

Davenport was at the time a manufacturing center related to farming. Factories of J.I. Case, John Deere, Caterpillar, Alcoa, and others employed many locals. This factory work was paid nearly as well as the alternate destinations of Detroit and Chicago factories, but in a less urban environment. Some migrants came from towns such as Quincy and Hannibal in addition to those from the Deep South.

In the late 1970s, when the manufacturing sector began to slow down and shed jobs, African-Americans, often the last hired, were the first to feel pain. A sustained economic downturn led to rough financial seas for most African-Americans in Davenport. They closed many of the black businesses in The Strip, located along the 600–900 blocks of Harrison Street; including Buckner Hauling, owned by Louis Buckner, one of the area's first African-American-owned garbage collection businesses; and the "Green Apartments," an apartment complex on Eighth Street in which future Super Bowl star Roger Craig grew up.

=== Civil rights struggles in the mid-20th century ===
Agitation for civil rights began in Davenport in the 1940s. As black men enlisted to serve during World War II, they wanted to gain equal rights at home. In 1942, the first civil rights discrimination lawsuit in Davenport was won by Charles Toney and his family against proprietors of an ice cream parlor. A ban on interracial dancing at the Melody Mill high school youth center was dropped in 1943 after protests.

In the 1960s and 1970s, the African-American population was segregated in certain neighborhoods, "mostly below the hill," as the black population increased. The students crowded into these schools, putting pressure on the buildings and other resources. Among these were Lincoln Elementary, Jefferson Elementary, JB Young Jr. High School, Sudlow Junior High School and Central High School.

School desegregation, first ordered by the state of Iowa in the early 1970s, was resisted by the Davenport Board of Education. It was only in 1977, after refusing state orders to develop a desegregation plan, protests against desegregation by white parents, and a discrimination investigation, that the Davenport school board implemented a plan which changed school district boundaries to facilitate racial integration.

=== Other developments in the latter 20th century ===
The 20th century marked several "firsts" in the history of African-Americans in Davenport:

- 1960 (c.) – Lafayette J. Twyner, dentist and first African American elected to the Davenport School Board
- 1965 (c.) – Bi-State chapter of the Southern Christian Leadership Council (SCLC) founded by Charles Westbrook
- 1970 – Soul Kitchen opens, first restaurant owned and operated by an African-American woman: Claudine Jackson.
- 1971 – James Smith becomes city's first African-American principal, at Lincoln Elementary
- 1976 – Bill Cribbs selected as first city Affirmative Action Director
- 2001 – Jamie Howard elected as first female African-American alderman.

In the mid-1990s, Davenport's African-American community became one of a small number across the Midwest (including Waterloo, Iowa, and Detroit) to start holding cotillion balls for teenage males. The idea behind the male cotillions in the various communities was to celebrate the achievements of outstanding blacks graduating from high school and bolster self-esteem.

== Culture ==
=== African-American-influenced music in Davenport ===
In the early 20th century, steamboats paddling up the Mississippi brought jazz musicians and others to river ports as far north as Davenport, and sometimes St. Paul, Minnesota. Louis Armstrong played on the Streckfus riverboats, which sometimes moored in such river cities, before returning downriver to New Orleans.

In addition, the city supported local venues. The Coliseum dance hall (1012 W. 4th Street) (nicknamed "the Col"), opened in 1914 and has been a venue for jazz and blues artists as well as other music. Artists who have played there include Duke Ellington, Jimi Hendrix and Louis Armstrong. Music historically originating among African-Americans such as jazz and blues also developed a following among the public at large in Davenport as they did elsewhere.

Bix Biederbecke, a German-American resident of Davenport, became a famous jazz musician in the early 20th century. He learned more about jazz music in his hometown, although he also had other important sources for his initial interest. According to Scott Allen Nollen, a biographer of Armstrong, Biederbecke "really began" his career in jazz at age 17 after hearing Armstrong on one of the riverboats.

In his memoir, Satchmo, Armstrong said that in 1920, on his second visit to Davenport on the Sidney, he

met the almighty Bix Biederbecke, the great cornet genius. Every musician in the world knew and admired Bix. He made the greatest reputation possible for himself, and we all respected him as though he had been a god. Whenever we saw him our faces shone with joy and happiness, but long periods would pass when we did not see him at all.

Other sources say the two met the year before on Armstrong's first visit to Davenport aboard The Capital.^{[encyclopedic tone?]}

Some say Biederbecke's music was influenced by Armstrong while others say that Biederbecke was one of the few white musicians of his day who developed original tone and phrasing independent of Armstrong's style. Biederbecke had influence even after his death; Miles Davis often sought out musicians who played with Biederbecke in order to learn more about his music. Another white Quad Cities musician, Louie Bellson (born "Luigi Ballasoni") of nearby Moline, Illinois, the son of a music store owner, played drums for the Benny Goodman, Tommy Dorsey, and Duke Ellington bands. He married singer Pearl Bailey. Danceland, once located on the second floor of 501 W. 4th Street but now closed, was a jazz venue in Davenport where Biederbecke and others played.

During the Little Rock Integration Crisis of 1957, Armstrong was in Davenport when he sent a telegram to President Dwight Eisenhower pledging his support for enforcing the law to integrate Little Rock, Arkansas schools. "Mr. President. Daddy if and when you decide to take those little negro children personally into Central High School along with your marvellous troops, please take me along ... I am swiss crissly yours Louis Satchmo Armstrong," the telegram read in part.

The Mississippi Valley Blues Society, headquartered in Davenport, is an organization promoting the knowledge and appreciation of blues music in the Quad Cities area. In addition to school programs and other activities, the organization sponsors an annual Mississippi Valley Blues Festival held each July; it is considered one of the major blues festivals in the United States. The group asserts that it has the most extensive blues education in the schools of any blues society in the country. The organization, the artists it invites to the festival, the audiences, and others served by the organization are of any race, although the heritage of the music in the Black community is recognized. In 2004, the 40th anniversary of the passage of the federal 1964 Civil Rights Act was celebrated in conjunction with the festival.

=== Social service organizations ===
The Semper Fidelis organization, a Davenport chapter of the National Association of Colored Women's Clubs and the third-oldest chapter of the Iowa Association of Colored Women's Clubs, is an African-American women's association whose purpose has been described as "to promote interracial understanding, peace and justice, as well as to raise standards in the home and among families". Founded in 1958, Semper Fidelis originally held its meetings in private homes because public places were unwelcoming to minorities, according to a long-time member of the group.

=== Community gathering places ===
- Soul Kitchen – Harrison Street (defunct)
- Joe's Barbershop – Harrison Street
- Dempsey's – Marquette Avenue (defunct)
- Jewell's Pool Hall – Harrison Street (defunct)
- California Club – Harrison Street (defunct)
- Cork Hill Park
- The Brick House – Ripley Street (defunct)
- DeShay's – Harrison Street (defunct)
- Wilma's – Harrison Street
- Ragan's Market – Harrison Street (defunct)
- Eighth Street Flea Market – Harrison Street (defunct)

=== Religion ===
- Bethel AME Church – a major church for African-American Protestants in the area.
- Community Outreach Church of God in Christ – a major church for African-American Pentecostals in the area.

== Notable African-American residents of Davenport ==
Notable figures and community leaders include Roger Craig, All-Pro NFL running back; Jamie Williams, NFL receiver and original writer of the film Any Given Sunday; Titus Burrage, who frequently danced with Bill "Bojangles" Robinson; Michael Nunn, middleweight boxing champion; Ricky Davis, professional basketball player; Jae Bryson, author and media owner; and Dana Davis, actress and singer. Phyllis Thede has been an Iowa state senator representing Davenport/Bettendorf since 2009. Her daughter Robin Thede, a comedian and writer, grew up here. In 2017 she became the first African-American woman host of a late-night TV talk show, The Rundown; she was previously the first African-American woman to be head writer on a late-night TV talk show (Larry Wilmore's The Nightly Show).

Local leaders of the community include the Rev. Charles Westbrook, founder of the Community Outreach Church of God in Christ.
