= Ophiem, Illinois =

- Unincorporated community
- Location within Illinois Location within the United States
- Coordinates: 41°15′15″N 90°22′50″W
- Country: US
- State: Illinois
- County: Henry County
- Township: Lynn Township

Area
  - Total: 1.18 sq mi (3.06 km^{2})
  - Land: 1.18 sq mi (3.06 km^{2})
  - Water: 0 sq mi (0.00 km^{2})
- Elevation: 696 ft (212 m)

Population (2020)
  - Total: 123
  - Density: 104.0/sq mi (40.17/km^{2})
- Time zone: UTC-6 (CST)
  - Summer (DST): UTC-5 (CDT)
- ZIP code: 61468
- GNIS feature ID: 2806536

Ophiem is an unincorporated community in Lynn Township, Henry County, Illinois, United States. As of the 2020 census, Ophiem had a population of 123.

It was founded in 1850 by Johannes and Carl Johan Samuelson, who named it "Opphem", after their family farm in Sweden.

A post office was established in 1871.

== Demographics ==
Historical population
Census	Pop.	Note	%±
2020	123		—
U.S. Decennial Census

Ophiem first appeared as a census designated place in the 2020 U.S. census.

== Education ==
Ophiem is in the Alwood Community Unit School District 225.
