= Osco, Illinois =

- Unincorporated community
- Location within Illinois Location within the United States
- Coordinates: 41°20′48″N 90°16′58″W
- Country: US
- State: Illinois
- County: Henry County
- Township: Osco Township

Area
  - Total: 0.19 sq mi (0.48 km^{2})
  - Land: 0.19 sq mi (0.48 km^{2})
  - Water: 0 sq mi (0.00 km^{2})
- Elevation: 771 ft (235 m)

Population (2020)
  - Total: 108
  - Density: 576.9/sq mi (222.73/km^{2})
- Time zone: UTC-6 (CST)
  - Summer (DST): UTC-5 (CDT)
- ZIP code: 61274
- GNIS feature ID: 2806538

Osco is a census designated place in Osco Township, Henry County, Illinois, United States. As of the 2020 census, Osco had a population of 108.

== Geography ==
According to the 2021 census gazetteer files, Osco has a total area of 0.19 square miles (0.49 km^{2}), all land.

== Demographics ==
Historical population
Census	Pop.	Note	%±
2020	108		—
U.S. Decennial Census

Osco first appeared as a census designated place in the 2020 U.S. census.

As of the 2020 census there were 108 people, 42 households, and 36 families residing in the CDP. The population density was 577.54 inhabitants per square mile (222.99/km^{2}). There were 46 housing units at an average density of 245.99 per square mile (94.98/km^{2}). The racial makeup of the CDP was 93.52% White, 3.70% African American, 0.00% Native American, 0.00% Asian, 0.00% Pacific Islander, 0.00% from other races, and 2.78% from two or more races. Hispanic or Latino of any race were 3.70% of the population.

There were 42 households, out of which 40.5% had children under the age of 18 living with them, 85.71% were married couples living together, 0.00% had a female householder with no husband present, and 14.29% were non-families. 14.29% of all households were made up of individuals, and 0.00% had someone living alone who was 65 years of age or older. The average household size was 2.89 and the average family size was 2.62.

The CDP's age distribution consisted of 12.7% under the age of 18, 13.6% from 18 to 24, 8.2% from 25 to 44, 65.5% from 45 to 64, and 0.0% who were 65 years of age or older. The median age was 52.0 years. For every 100 females, there were 129.2 males. For every 100 females age 18 and over, there were 146.2 males.

The median income for a household in the CDP was $116,923, and the median income for a family was $123,750. Males had a median income of $72,750. The per capita income for the CDP was $40,368. No of families and 5.5% of the population were below the poverty line.

== Education ==
It is in the Orion Community Unit School District 223.
