= Illinois Route 81 =

State highway in Henry County, Illinois, US

Illinois Route 81
- IL 81 highlighted in red

Route information
- Maintained by IDOT
- Length: 25.78 mi (41.49 km)
- Existed: 1924–present

Major junctions
- West end: US 150 in Lynn Center
- I-74 / IL 110 (CKC) in Andover; IL 82 in Cambridge
- East end: IL 78 in Kewanee

Location
- Country: United States
- State: Illinois
- Counties: Henry

Highway system
- Illinois State Highway System; Interstate; US; State; Tollways; Scenic
← I-80	→ IL 82

Illinois Route 81 is an east–west state road in northwest Illinois. It runs from U.S. Route 150 by unincorporated Lynn Center to Illinois Route 78 (Main Street) in Kewanee. This is a distance of 25.78 miles (41.49 km).

== Route description ==
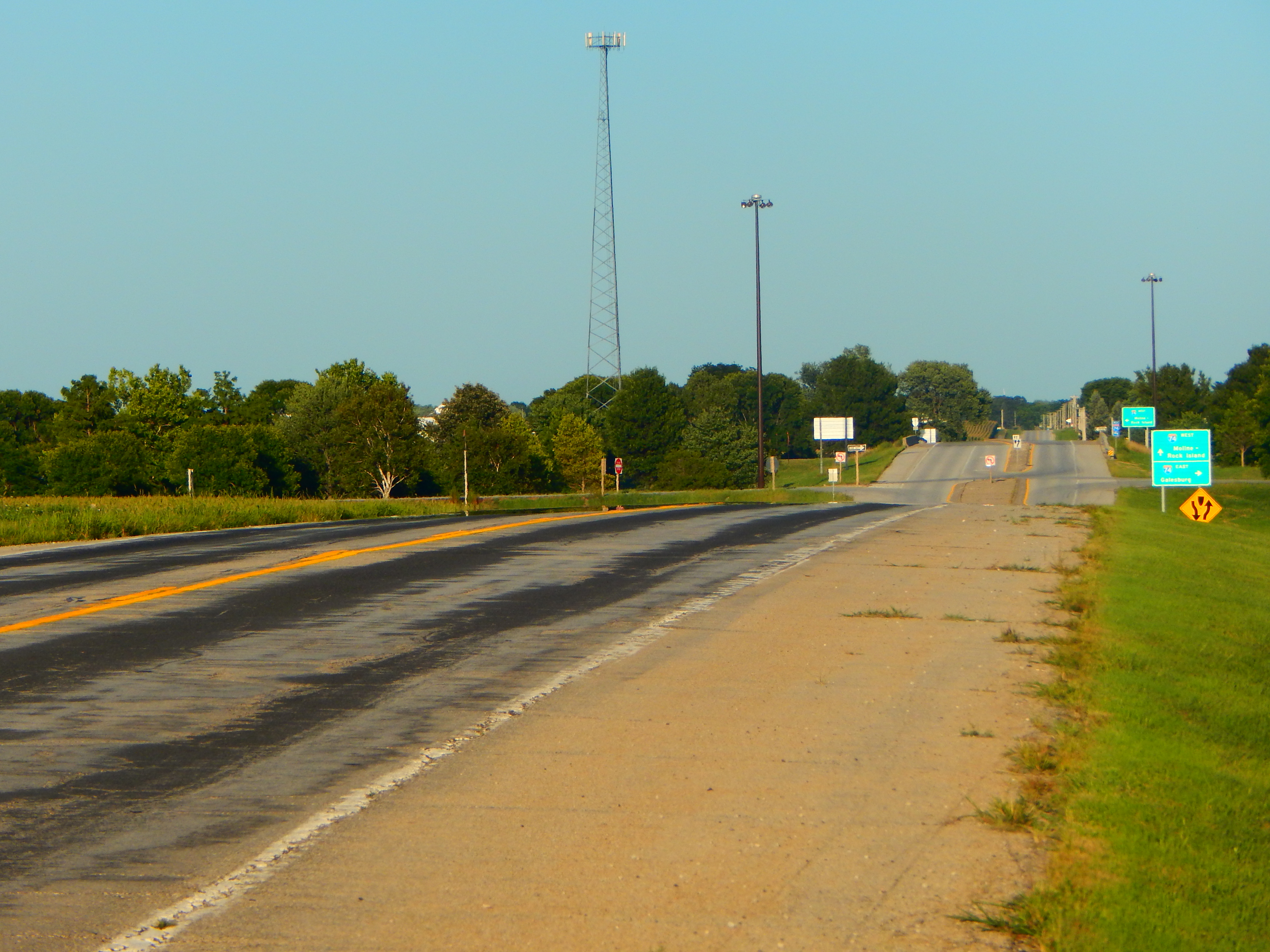
IL 81 approaching I-74 in Andover

In Kewanee, Illinois 81 is 6th Street. It is not that far away from U.S. Route 34, which is 2nd street. In addition to Kewanee, Illinois 81 also serves Andover and Cambridge.

== History ==
SBI Route 81 was established as Lynn Center to Kewanee. The routing of Illinois 81 has not changed since it was established.

== Major intersections ==
The entire route is in Henry County.

Location	mi	km	Destinations	Notes
	0.0	0.0	US 150 – Galesburg, Moline	
	2.2	3.5	I-74 – Moline, Rock Island, Galesburg	Exit 24 (I-74)
Cambridge	10.6	17.1	IL 82 south	Begin/end concurrency with IL 82
	11.6	18.7	IL 82 north – Geneseo	Begin/end concurrency with IL 82
Kewanee	25.78	41.49	IL 78	
1.000 mi = 1.609 km; 1.000 km = 0.621 mi: Concurrency terminus
