= Lynn Center, Illinois =

- Unincorporated community
- Location within Illinois Location within the United States
- Coordinates: 41°17′41″N 90°21′33″W
- Country: USA
- State: Illinois
- County: Henry County
- Township: Lynn Township

Area
  - Total: 0.20 sq mi (0.51 km^{2})
  - Land: 0.20 sq mi (0.51 km^{2})
  - Water: 0 sq mi (0.00 km^{2})
- Elevation: 755 ft (230 m)

Population (2020)
  - Total: 85
  - Density: 434.7/sq mi (167.84/km^{2})
- Time zone: UTC-6 (CST)
  - Summer (DST): UTC-5 (CDT)
- ZIP code: 61262
- GNIS feature ID: 2806523
- FIPS code: 17-45343

Lynn Center is a census-designated place in Lynn Township, Henry County, Illinois, United States. As of the 2020 census, Lynn Center had a population of 85.

== Geography ==
According to the 2021 census gazetteer files, Lynn Center has a total area of 0.20 square miles (0.52 km^{2}), all land.

== Demographics ==
Historical population
Census	Pop.	Note	%±
2020	85		—
U.S. Decennial Census

Lynn Center first appeared as a census designated place in the 2020 U.S. census.

As of the 2020 census there were 85 people, 19 households, and 19 families residing in the CDP. The population density was 433.67 inhabitants per square mile (167.44/km^{2}). There were 37 housing units at an average density of 188.78 per square mile (72.89/km^{2}). The racial makeup of the CDP was 88.24% White, 0.00% African American, 0.00% Native American, 1.18% Asian, 0.00% Pacific Islander, 0.00% from other races, and 10.59% from two or more races. Hispanic or Latino of any race were 8.24% of the population.

There were 19 households, 100.00% of which were married couples living together. The average household size was 2.05 and the average family size was 2.05.

The CDP's age distribution consisted of 0.0% under the age of 18, 0.0% from 18 to 24, 0% from 25 to 44, 59% from 45 to 64, and 41.0% who were 65 years of age or older. The median age was 53.7 years. For every 100 females, there were 85.7 males. For every 100 females age 18 and over, there were 85.7 males.

== Education ==
It is in the Orion Community Unit School District 223.
