= Rivoli Township, Mercer County, Illinois =

Coordinates: 41°11′34″N 90°29′47″W

Rivoli Township
- Township
- Location in Mercer County

- Mercer County's location in Illinois
- Country: United States
- State: Illinois
- County: Mercer
- Established: November 8, 1853

Area
  - Total: 35.01 sq mi (90.7 km^{2})
  - Land: 35 sq mi (91 km^{2})
  - Water: 0.01 sq mi (0.026 km^{2}) 0.03%

Population (2010)
  - Estimate (2016): 1,165
  - Density: 32.6/sq mi (12.6/km^{2})
- Time zone: UTC-6 (CST)
  - Summer (DST): UTC-5 (CDT)
- FIPS code: 17-131-64551

Rivoli Township is located in Mercer County, Illinois. As of the 2010 census, its population was 1,142 and it contained 516 housing units. Rivoli Township changed its name from North Pope Township sometime before 1921.

== Geography ==
According to the 2010 census, the township has a total area of 35.01 square miles (90.7 km^{2}), of which 35 square miles (91 km^{2}) (or 99.97%) is land and 0.01 square miles (0.026 km^{2}) (or 0.03%) is water.

== Demographics ==
Historical population
Census	Pop.	Note	%±
2016 (est.)	1,165
U.S. Decennial Census

== Notable people ==
- Juanita Breckenridge Bates, born in Hopewell, Rivoli Township in 1860.
- Alson Streeter (1823-1901), politician and third-party presidential candidate. He resided in Rivoli Township and represented the township on the Mercer County Board of Supervisors.
