= Orion Community Unit School District 223 =

School district in Illinois, United States

The Orion Community Unit School District 223 is a school district in Illinois. The district serves pre-kindergarten through twelfth grade students The district's three schools are all located in the village of Orion. In 2016, the district enrolled 1,088 students and employed 67 teachers, 37% of whom hold a master's degree or higher. The current superintendent is Mr. Joe A. Blessman. The former superintendent is Dr. David Deets.

== Boundaries ==
Most of the district is in Henry County. There, the district includes Orion, Lynn Center, Osco, most of Andover, the Henry County portion of Coal Valley, and a portion of Colona. Included in the portion of Colona is a section of the former Green Rock. The district also includes the unincorporated communities of Sunny Hill and Warner. The district extends into Rock Island County.

== Schools ==
- C. R. Hanna Elementary School
- Orion Middle School
- Orion High School
