= National Register of Historic Places listings in Mercer County, Illinois =

Location of Mercer County in Illinois

This is a list of the National Register of Historic Places listings in Mercer County, Illinois.

This is intended to be a complete list of the properties and districts on the National Register of Historic Places in Mercer County, Illinois, United States. Latitude and longitude coordinates are provided for many National Register properties and districts; these locations may be seen together in a map.

There are 12 properties and districts listed on the National Register in the county. Another property was once listed but has been removed.

This National Park Service list is complete through NPS recent listings posted March 21, 2025.

== Current listings ==
	Name on the Register	Image	Date listed	Location	City or town	Description
1	Commercial House	Commercial House	May 9, 1983 (#83000332)	5th and Main St. 41°06′03″N 90°56′32″W	Keithsburg	
2	Downtown Aledo Historic District	Downtown Aledo Historic District	June 7, 2016 (#16000328)	100-200 blocks N. College, 100, 200, 300 blocks S. College, 100 blk. NW. 2nd, 200 blk. SW. 2nd Aves. 41°12′05″N 90°44′57″W	Aledo	
3	Gideon Ives House	Gideon Ives House	November 8, 2000 (#00001332)	408 E. Jefferson St. 41°10′10″N 90°59′39″W	New Boston	
4	Keithsburg Historic District	Keithsburg Historic District	May 8, 1986 (#86001004)	Roughly bounded by Jackson, 5th, Washington, and 3rd Sts. 41°06′03″N 90°56′32″W	Keithsburg	
5	Lock and Dam No. 17 Historic District	Lock and Dam No. 17 Historic District	March 10, 2004 (#04000177)	173 Lock and Dam Rd. 41°11′31″N 91°03′29″W	New Boston	
6	Mercer County Courthouse	Mercer County Courthouse	June 17, 1982 (#82002589)	100 SE 3rd St. 41°11′58″N 90°44′55″W	Aledo	
7	Mercer County Fairgrounds	Mercer County Fairgrounds	May 2, 1997 (#97000380)	12th Ave., SW., .5 mi. S of jct. with IL 17; 41°11′30″N 90°45′52″W	Aledo	
8	Mercer County Jail	Mercer County Jail	July 25, 1997 (#97000816)	309 S. College Ave. 41°11′57″N 90°44′58″W	Aledo	
9	Sherrard Banking Company	Sherrard Banking Company	February 16, 1996 (#96000092)	314 Third St. 41°19′08″N 90°30′20″W	Sherrard	
10	James S. Thompson House	James S. Thompson House	December 3, 2002 (#02000846)	804 North St. 41°10′27″N 90°59′46″W	New Boston	
11	Verdurette		June 17, 2021 (#100005658)	665 65th Ave. 41°09′59″N 90°57′44″W	New Boston	
12	Levi Willits House	Levi Willits House	April 20, 1995 (#95000488)	202 Main St. 41°10′07″N 90°59′59″W	New Boston	

== Former listing ==
	Name on the Register	Image	Date listed	Date removed	Location	City or town	Description
1	United Presbyterian Church		November 7, 1980 (#80001398)	July 17, 1984	Main and 8th Sts.	Keithsburg	

== See also ==
- List of National Historic Landmarks in Illinois
- National Register of Historic Places listings in Illinois
