= Seaton, Illinois =

- Village
- Location in Mercer County, Illinois

- Location in the United States
- Coordinates: 41°06′08″N 90°47′57″W
- Country: United States
- State: Illinois
- County: Mercer
- Township: Abington

Area
  - Total: 1.58 sq mi (4.09 km^{2})
  - Land: 1.58 sq mi (4.09 km^{2})
  - Water: 0 sq mi (0.00 km^{2})
- Elevation: 610 ft (190 m)

Population (2020)
  - Total: 214
  - Density: 135.6/sq mi (52.34/km^{2})
- Time zone: UTC-6 (CST)
  - Summer (DST): UTC-5 (CDT)
- ZIP code: 61476
- Area code: 309
- FIPS code: 17-68458
- GNIS feature ID: 2399779

Seaton is a village in Mercer County, Illinois, United States. The population was 214 at the 2020 census.

== Geography ==
Seaton is located in southern Mercer County 9 miles (14 km) south-southwest of Aledo, the county seat, and 7 miles (11 km) east of Keithsburg.

According to the U.S. Census Bureau, Seaton has a total area of 1.58 square miles (4.09 km^{2}), all land. Snake Creek flows through the southwest part of the village, leading southeast to North Henderson Creek, part of the Henderson Creek watershed running southwest to the Mississippi River.

== Demographics ==
Historical population
| Census | Pop. | Note | %± |
|---|---|---|---|
| 1910 | 326 | | — |
| 1920 | 297 | | −8.9% |
| 1930 | 310 | | 4.4% |
| 1940 | 271 | | −12.6% |
| 1950 | 285 | | 5.2% |
| 1960 | 235 | | −17.5% |
| 1970 | 251 | | 6.8% |
| 1980 | 255 | | 1.6% |
| 1990 | 221 | | −13.3% |
| 2000 | 242 | | 9.5% |
| 2010 | 222 | | −8.3% |
| 2020 | 214 | | −3.6% |
U.S. Decennial Census

As of the census of 2000, there were 242 people, 88 households, and 69 families residing in the village. The population density was 154.3 inhabitants per square mile (59.6/km^{2}). There were 94 housing units at an average density of 59.9 per square mile (23.1/km^{2}). The racial makeup of the village was 97.11% White and 2.89% African American.

There were 88 households, out of which 34.1% had children under the age of 18 living with them, 67.0% were married couples living together, 9.1% had a female householder with no husband present, and 20.5% were non-families. 15.9% of all households were made up of individuals, and 6.8% had someone living alone who was 65 years of age or older. The average household size was 2.75 and the average family size was 3.11.

In the village, the population was spread out, with 28.9% under the age of 18, 4.1% from 18 to 24, 29.3% from 25 to 44, 21.5% from 45 to 64, and 16.1% who were 65 years of age or older. The median age was 36 years. For every 100 females, there were 93.6 males. For every 100 females age 18 and over, there were 91.1 males.

The median income for a household in the village was $45,694, and the median income for a family was $46,389. Males had a median income of $38,750 versus $15,417 for females. The per capita income for the village was $35,832. About 4.1% of families and 2.7% of the population were below the poverty line, including none of those under the age of eighteen and 10.7% of those 65 or over.
