= Wanlock, Illinois =

- Unincorporated community
- Location within Illinois Location within the United States
- Coordinates: 41°13′09″N 90°37′28″W
- Country: United States
- State: Illinois
- County: Mercer
- Elevation: 781 ft (238 m)
- Time zone: UTC-6 (Central (CST))
  - Summer (DST): UTC-5 (CDT)
- Area code: 309
- GNIS feature ID: 420511

Wanlock is an unincorporated community in Greene Township, Mercer County, Illinois, United States. Wanlock is 2.5 miles (4.0 km) west-northwest of Viola.
