= Sunbeam, Illinois =

- Unincorporated community
- Location within Illinois Location within the United States
- Coordinates: 41°07′38″N 90°44′07″W
- Country: United States
- State: Illinois
- County: Mercer
- Elevation: 676 ft (206 m)
- Time zone: UTC-6 (Central (CST))
  - Summer (DST): UTC-5 (CDT)
- Area code: 309
- GNIS feature ID: 419369

Sunbeam is an unincorporated community in Ohio Grove Township, Mercer County, Illinois, United States. Sunbeam is located near Illinois Route 94, 5 miles (8.0 km) south of Aledo.
