= Keithsburg Historic District =

Historic district in Illinois, United States

- U.S. National Register of Historic Places
- U.S. Historic district
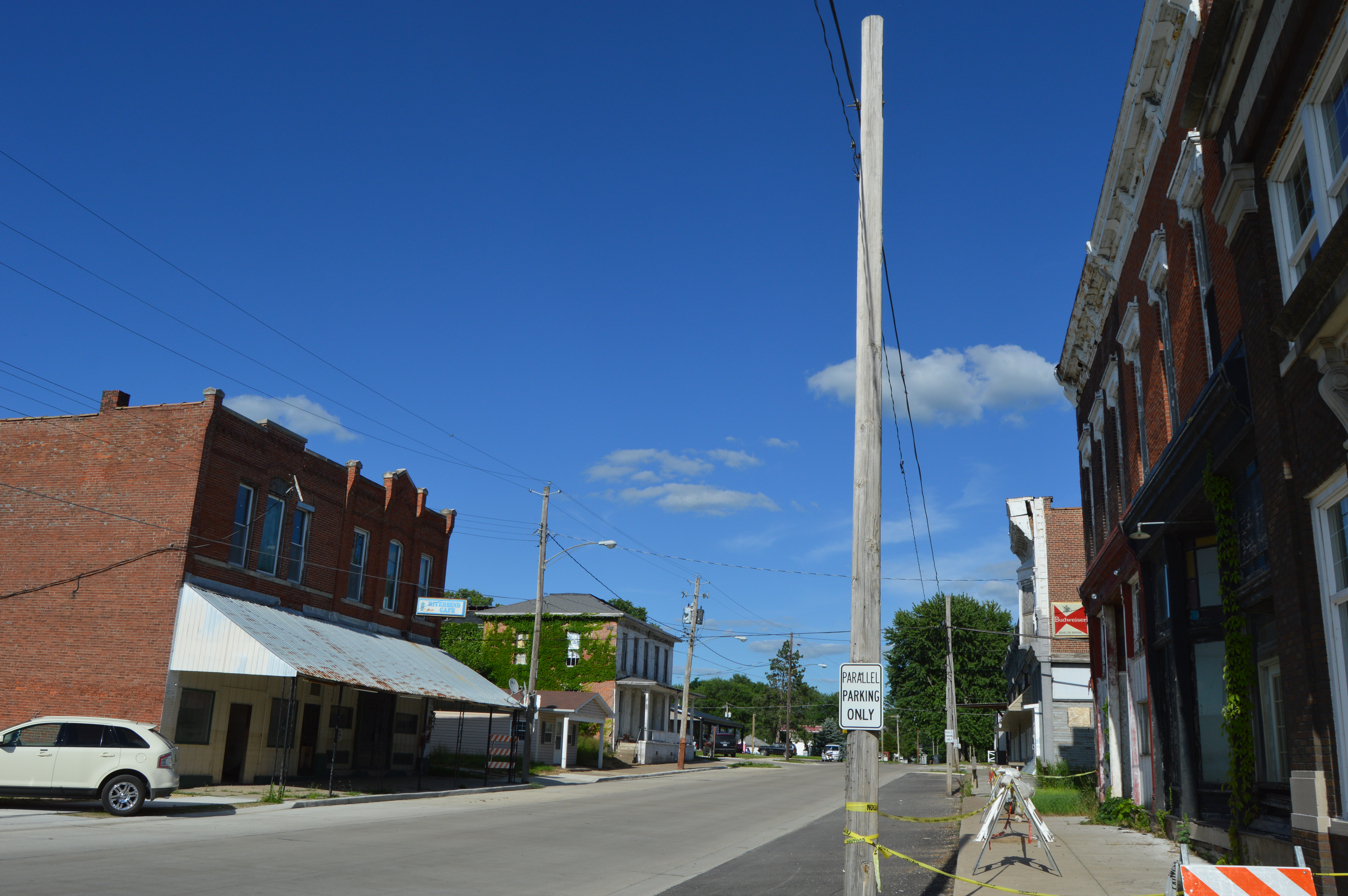

- Location within Illinois Location within the United States
- Location: Roughly bounded by Jackson, Fifth, Washington, and Third Sts., Keithsburg, Illinois
- Coordinates: 41°6′3″N 90°56′32″W
- Area: 2 acres (0.81 ha)
- NRHP reference No.: 86001004
- Added to NRHP: May 8, 1986

The Keithsburg Historic District is a historic commercial district encompassing four blocks at the center of Keithsburg, Illinois. The district includes 17 buildings, 15 of which are contributing buildings to its historic nature; all but two of the buildings were historically used for commercial purposes. Two of the district's buildings, the Commercial House and the Masonic Lodge, date to the 1840s and 1850s, when Keithsburg was the Mercer County seat; the remainder of the contributing buildings were built in the late 19th and early 20th centuries. The buildings are mainly one- and two-story brick structures, and many are adorned with metal storefronts, window hoods, and cornices. The district's collection of commercial buildings are representative of Keithsburg's role as a small but prosperous Mississippi River port and regional trade center prior to the rise of the automobile.

The district was added to the National Register of Historic Places on May 8, 1986.

Since listing, the following properties have been demolished (numbers from listing):
1. Pease Building
2. Wade Building
4. Bushong Building
11. Bettler Block
14. Henderson Building
15. Citizens' State Bank
17. Elliott Building

Of the remainder, all but #5, part of #12, and #16 are vacant and derelict.
