= Burgess, Illinois =

- Unincorporated community
- Location within Illinois Location within the United States
- Coordinates: 41°07′38″N 90°38′29″W
- Country: United States
- State: Illinois
- County: Mercer
- Elevation: 702 ft (214 m)
- Time zone: UTC-6 (Central (CST))
  - Summer (DST): UTC-5 (CDT)
- Area code: 309
- GNIS feature ID: 405217

Burgess is an unincorporated community in Suez Township, Mercer County, Illinois, United States. Burgess is 6 miles (9.7 km) south-southwest of Viola.
