= Petersville, Illinois =

- Unincorporated community
- Location within Illinois Location within the United States
- Coordinates: 41°16′46″N 90°56′19″W
- Country: United States
- State: Illinois
- County: Mercer
- Elevation: 669 ft (204 m)
- Time zone: UTC-6 (Central (CST))
  - Summer (DST): UTC-5 (CDT)
- Area code: 309
- GNIS feature ID: 423065

Petersville is an unincorporated community in Eliza Township, Mercer County, Illinois, United States. Petersville is 6.5 miles (10.5 km) north-northwest of Joy.
