= Matherville, Illinois =

Village in Mercer County, Illinois, United States

- Village
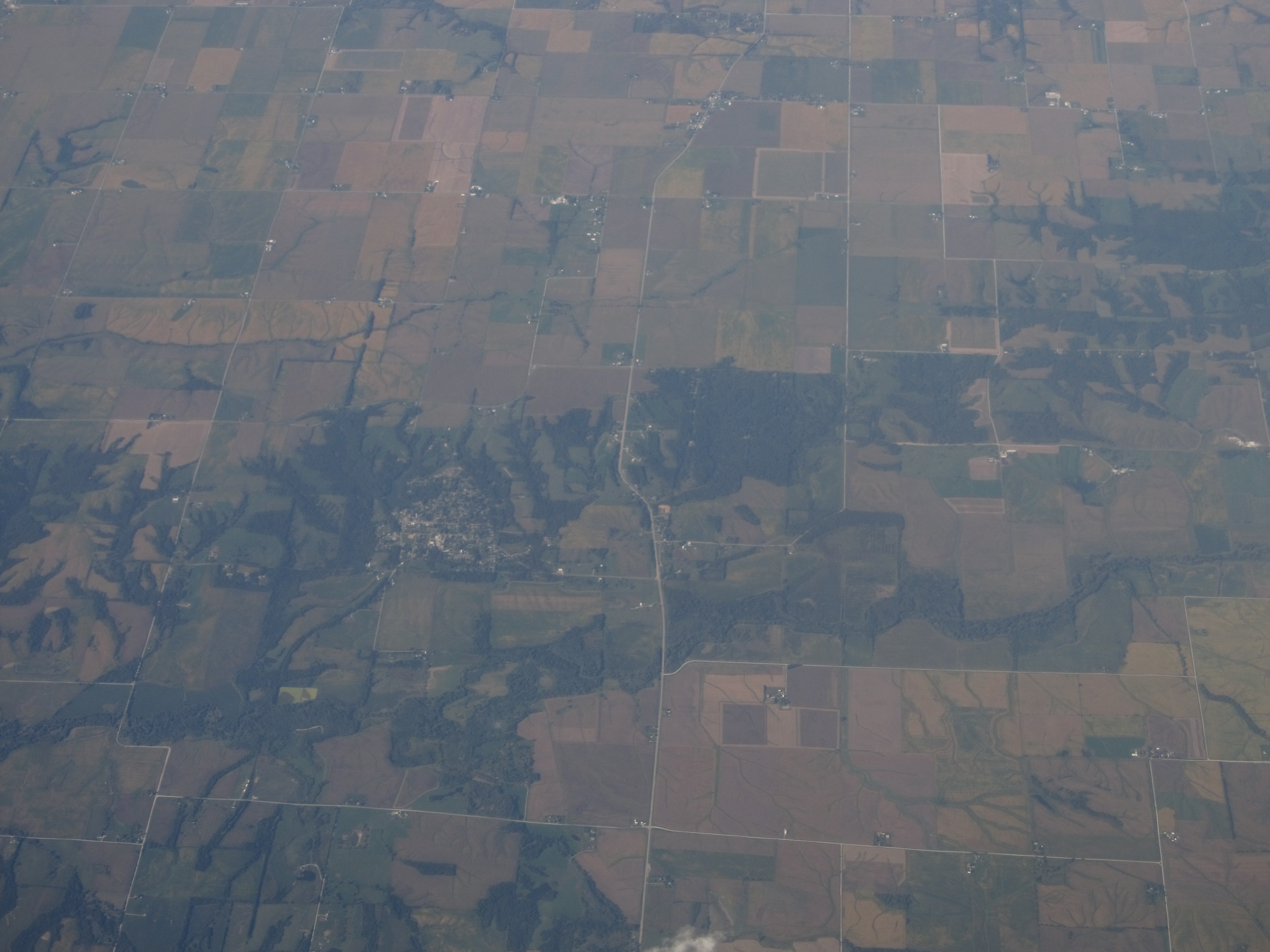
- 2012 aerial photo of Matherville

- Location in Mercer County, Illinois

- Location in the United States
- Coordinates: 41°15′34″N 90°36′20″W
- Country: United States
- State: Illinois
- County: Mercer
- Township: Preemption

Area
  - Total: 0.40 sq mi (1.03 km^{2})
  - Land: 0.39 sq mi (1.01 km^{2})
  - Water: 0.0077 sq mi (0.02 km^{2})
- Elevation: 732 ft (223 m)

Population (2020)
  - Total: 707
  - Density: 1,808.1/sq mi (698.12/km^{2})
- Time zone: UTC-6 (CST)
  - Summer (DST): UTC-5 (CDT)
- ZIP code: 61263
- Area code: 309
- FIPS code: 17-47527
- GNIS feature ID: 2399273
- Website: matherville.org

Matherville is a village in Mercer County, Illinois, United States. The population was 707 at the 2020 census.

== Geography ==
Matherville is located in northeastern Mercer County 5 miles (8 km) north of Viola and 11 miles (18 km) northeast of Aledo, the Mercer County seat.

According to the U.S. Census Bureau, Matherville has a total area of 0.40 square miles (1.04 km^{2}), of which 0.01 square miles (0.03 km^{2}), or 2.01%, are water. The village sits on a hillside which drains to the south toward the Edwards River, a west-flowing tributary of the Mississippi River. Lake Matherville, a small reservoir, is in the northwest corner of the village.

== Demographics ==
Historical population
Census	Pop.	Note	%±
1920	886		—
1930	399		−55.0%
1940	565		41.6%
1950	590		4.4%
1960	612		3.7%
1970	699		14.2%
1980	793		13.4%
1990	708		−10.7%
2000	772		9.0%
2010	723		−6.3%
2020	707		−2.2%
U.S. Decennial Census

At the 2000 census, there were 772 people, 290 households, and 216 families living in the village. The population density was 1,968.7 inhabitants per square mile (760.1/km^{2}). There were 301 housing units at an average density of 767.6 per square mile (296.4/km^{2}). The racial makeup of the village was 98.45% White, 0.26% Asian, 0.52% from other races, and 0.78% from two or more races. Hispanic or Latino of any race were 1.04%.

Of the 290 households, 45.2% had children under the age of 18 living with them, 55.5% were married couples living together, 15.2% had a female householder with no husband present, and 25.5% were non-families. 21.7% of households were one person, and 10.7% were one person aged 65 or older. The average household size was 2.66, and the average family size was 3.06.

The age distribution was 32.4% under the age of 18, 7.1% from 18 to 24, 31.2% from 25 to 44, 18.3% from 45 to 64, and 11.0% 65 or older. The median age was 32 years. For every 100 females, there were 90.6 males. For every 100 females age 18 and over, there were 80.6 males.

The median household income was $33,438 and the median family income was $39,375. Males had a median income of $37,273 versus $25,179 for females. The per capita income for the village was $14,956. About 14.1% of families and 15.8% of the population were below the poverty line, including 24.5% of those under age 18 and 4.0% of those age 65 or over.

Matherville is part of the Sherrard Public Library District. Matherville is served locally by the Library District Bookmobile one day a week, with a stop at the Old School Park.

== See also ==
- List of municipalities in Illinois
