= Boden, Illinois =

- Unincorporated community
- Location within Illinois Location within the United States
- Coordinates: 41°15′30″N 90°35′13″W
- Country: United States
- State: Illinois
- County: Mercer
- Elevation: 653 ft (199 m)
- Time zone: UTC-6 (Central (CST))
  - Summer (DST): UTC-5 (CDT)
- Area code: 309
- GNIS feature ID: 404642

Boden is an unincorporated community in Preemption Township, Mercer County, Illinois, United States. Boden is located on U.S. Route 67, 1 mile (1.6 km) east of Matherville.
