= Ives House =

Ives House may refer to:

- Charles Ives House, Danbury, Connecticut, listed on the NRHP in Fairfield County, Connecticut
- Ives-Baldwin House, Meriden, Connecticut, listed on the NRHP in New Haven County, Connecticut
- Gideon Ives House New Boston, Illinois, listed on the NRHP in Mercer County, Illinois
- Dr. John Ives House, Jamesville, New York, listed on the NRHP in Onondaga County, New Yorke
- Thomas P. Ives House, Providence, Rhode Island, a National Historic Landmark
