= WRMJ =

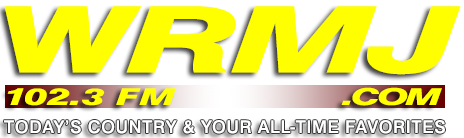
- Aledo, Illinois; United States
- Broadcast area: Western Illinois, Aledo, Muscatine
- Frequency: 102.3 MHz
- Branding: WRMJ 102.3 FM

Programming
- Format: Country
- Affiliations: ABC Direction Network; Illinois Radio Network; Brownfield Network; RFD Radio Network

Ownership
- Owner: William Albertson; (WRMJ LLC)

History
- First air date: June 12, 1979

Technical information
- Licensing authority: FCC
- Facility ID: 71790
- Class: A
- ERP: 3,000 watts
- HAAT: 91 m (299 ft)
- Transmitter coordinates: 41°12′29″N 90°48′10″W

Links
- Public license information: Public file; LMS
- Website: www.wrmj.com

WRMJ (102.3 FM) is a commercial radio station that serves the Aledo, Illinois area, as well as Mercer and surrounding counties in the northwest central and west central portions of Illinois, and southeast central and east central portions of Iowa. The station broadcasts a Country format. WRMJ is owned by William Albertson, through licensee WRMJ LLC, and has its transmitter located on 151st Street in rural Mercer County, just off Illinois Route 17 west of Aledo.

A small town based and locally owned radio station, WRMJ broadcasts a variety of news content, including national news from the ABC Direction Network, agriculture news from the Brownfield Radio Network, and local news, including weather, sports, and local area farm news. WRMJ also provides coverage of area high school sports in Mercer and surrounding counties, and carries St. Louis Cardinals Baseball during the Baseball Season and University of Illinois Football and Basketball during the college football and basketball seasons respectively. Local religious services are broadcast at various times on Sundays.

As of August 1, 2023, WRMJ has been sold to William Albertson's WRMJ LLC for $508,029.
