= North Henderson, Illinois =

- Village
- Location in Mercer County, Illinois

- Location in the United States
- Coordinates: 41°05′25″N 90°28′29″W
- Country: United States
- State: Illinois
- County: Mercer
- Township: North Henderson

Area
  - Total: 0.23 sq mi (0.59 km^{2})
  - Land: 0.23 sq mi (0.59 km^{2})
  - Water: 0 sq mi (0.00 km^{2})
- Elevation: 774 ft (236 m)

Population (2020)
  - Total: 162
  - Density: 715.9/sq mi (276.42/km^{2})
- Time zone: UTC-6 (CST)
  - Summer (DST): UTC-5 (CDT)
- ZIP code: 61466
- Area code: 309
- FIPS code: 17-53793
- GNIS feature ID: 2399516

North Henderson is a village in Mercer County, Illinois, United States. The population was 162 at the 2020 census.

== Geography ==
North Henderson is located in southeastern Mercer County 21 miles (34 km) southeast of Aledo, the county seat, and 14 miles (23 km) northwest of Galesburg.

According to the U.S. Census Bureau, North Henderson has a total area of 0.23 square miles (0.60 km^{2}), all land.

== Demographics ==
Historical population
Census	Pop.	Note	%±
1880	176		—
1960	210		—
1970	246		17.1%
1980	234		−4.9%
1990	184		−21.4%
2000	187		1.6%
2010	187		0.0%
2020	162		−13.4%
U.S. Decennial Census

At the 2000 census there were 187 people, 74 households, and 52 families living in the village. The population density was 832.3 inhabitants per square mile (321.4/km^{2}). There were 77 housing units at an average density of 342.7 per square mile (132.3/km^{2}). The racial makeup of the village was 100.00% White. Hispanic or Latino of any race were 1.07%.

Of the 74 households 31.1% had children under the age of 18 living with them, 56.8% were married couples living together, 13.5% had a female householder with no husband present, and 28.4% were non-families. 27.0% of households were one person and 10.8% were one person aged 65 or older. The average household size was 2.53 and the average family size was 3.04.

The age distribution was 24.1% under the age of 18, 6.4% from 18 to 24, 33.2% from 25 to 44, 19.8% from 45 to 64, and 16.6% 65 or older. The median age was 36 years. For every 100 females, there were 110.1 males. For every 100 females age 18 and over, there were 100.0 males.

The median household income was $35,500 and the median family income was $42,500. Males had a median income of $28,958 versus $25,625 for females. The per capita income for the village was $16,292. About 5.6% of families and 8.7% of the population were below the poverty line, including 14.9% of those under the age of eighteen and 15.6% of those sixty five or over.

== Notable person ==
- Karl Swanson, second baseman for the Chicago White Sox; born in North Henderson
