= Roy James Carver =

American industrialist and philanthropist (1909–1981)

- Born: December 15, 1909; Preemption, Illinois, U.S.
- Died: June 7, 1981 (aged 71); Marbella, Spain
- Education: University of Illinois
- Occupations: Industrialist, Philanthropist
- Known for: Founder of Carver Pump Factory and Bandag
- Spouse: Lucille Young (m. 1942)
- Children: 4

Roy James Carver (December 15, 1909 – June 7, 1981) was an American industrialist and philanthropist. Carver started the Carver Pump Factory with his brother and then later owned Bandag. As a philanthropist, he started the Roy J. Carver Charitable Trust.

== Personal life and career ==
Carver was born on December 15, 1909, to James and Laura Carver in Preemption, Illinois. In 1927, he completed high school in Moline, Illinois. After earning a BS degree in engineering from the University of Illinois in 1934, Carver became state engineer for Illinois.

In 1938, during the Great Depression, Carver and his brother Ralph started the Carver Pump Company in Matherville, Illinois. The company created self-priming pumps, and it soon supplied the United States and Allied Forces navies during World War II. Due to the need for a larger facility, the company was moved to an abandoned sauerkraut factory in Muscatine, Iowa. Carver also lived in Muscatine, and shortly after moving there he married Lucille Young in 1942. The two of them had four children.

During a postwar trip to Germany, Carver bought the North American rights to a manufacturing process for tires created by Bernard Anton Nowak as a part of Bandage, Inc. The process "cures or vulcanizes rubber tires at lower temperatures than other retreading processes". After Nowak died in 1961, Carver bought the worldwide rights to the process and gained full ownership of Bandag. Bandag became one of the top American corporations in the early 1970s. In 1973, the company earned the 909th spot on Fortune's top 1,000 companies. During the late 1970s, Carver created more than 850 dealership franchises in more than 50 countries.

Carver bought a villa in Cannes, a 25,000-acre ranch in Central America, two yachts, and multiple airplanes. Carver was interested in different languages and had learned Italian, French, Spanish, and German.

== Philanthropy and death ==
Carver primarily donated money to people in Iowa, and it was noted in the Muscatine Journal that "he took great pleasure in helping others". He also contributed financially to Richard Nixon's presidential campaign and to Augustana College. In 1971, Carver donated shares of Bandag stock valued at $3.5 million to the University of Iowa, which was the university's largest donation at the time. He started the Roy J. Carver Charitable Trust, which provided millions of dollars to universities including the University of Iowa, University of Illinois, and St. Ambrose University. He founded the Roy Carver Memorial Pavilion, a treatment center at the University of Iowa Hospitals, Carver Hawkeye Arena, a large biomedical research facility and the Carver Wing of the Museum of Art. Carver provided the funds to the University of Northern Iowa to complete the UNI Dome and built the Roy J. Carver Engineering Building at the University of Illinois. As a result, the University of Iowa renamed the College of Medicine as The Roy J. and Lucille A. Carver College of Medicine. Millions of dollars given by the Carver Trust have funded the Carver Scholarship Program. His widow, Lucille Carver, funded several projects as well.

Carver died of a heart attack on June 7, 1981, at 71 years of age in Marbella, Spain.
