= Marston, Illinois =

- Unincorporated community
- Location within Illinois Location within the United States
- Coordinates: 41°18′26″N 90°48′07″W
- Country: United States
- State: Illinois
- County: Mercer
- Elevation: 781 ft (238 m)
- Time zone: UTC-6 (Central (CST))
  - Summer (DST): UTC-5 (CDT)
- Area code: 309
- GNIS feature ID: 425824

Marston is an unincorporated community in Duncan Township, Mercer County, Illinois, United States. Marston is 7 miles (11 km) west of Reynolds.
