= Joy, Illinois =

- Village
- Location in Mercer County, Illinois

- Location in the United States
- Coordinates: 41°11′49″N 90°52′34″W
- Country: United States
- State: Illinois
- County: Mercer
- Township: Millersburg

Area
  - Total: 0.43 sq mi (1.11 km^{2})
  - Land: 0.43 sq mi (1.11 km^{2})
  - Water: 0 sq mi (0.00 km^{2})
- Elevation: 686 ft (209 m)

Population (2020)
  - Total: 372
  - Density: 869.6/sq mi (335.77/km^{2})
- Time zone: UTC-6 (CST)
  - Summer (DST): UTC-5 (CDT)
- ZIP code: 61260
- Area code: 309
- FIPS code: 17-38739
- GNIS feature ID: 2398312
- Website: joyillinois.com

Joy is a village in Mercer County, Illinois, United States. The population was 372 as of the 2020 census.

The village was founded in 1869 and named after the president of the Chicago, Burlington and Quincy Railroad, J. F. Joy.

== Geography ==
Joy is located in western Mercer County. Illinois Route 17 passes through the village on Center Street, leading east 7 miles (11 km) to Aledo, the county seat, and west the same distance to its terminus in New Boston, on the Mississippi River.

According to the U.S. Census Bureau, Joy has a total area of 0.43 square miles (1.11 km^{2}), all land. The village drains east to a north-flowing tributary of the Edwards River, a west-flowing tributary of the Mississippi River; and west to headwaters of the Mud River, part of the Pope Creek watershed flowing southwest to the Mississippi.

== Demographics ==
Historical population
Census	Pop.	Note	%±
1880	87		—
1910	516		—
1920	529		2.5%
1930	524		−0.9%
1940	470		−10.3%
1950	505		7.4%
1960	503		−0.4%
1970	513		2.0%
1980	506		−1.4%
1990	452		−10.7%
2000	373		−17.5%
2010	417		11.8%
2020	372		−10.8%
U.S. Decennial Census

At the 2000 census, there were 373 people, 156 households and 104 families residing in the village. The population density was 888.3 inhabitants per square mile (343.0/km^{2}). There were 167 housing units at an average density of 397.7 per square mile (153.6/km^{2}). The racial makeup of the village was 99.46% White, and 0.54% from two or more races. Hispanic or Latino of any race were 1.07% of the population.

There were 156 households, of which 32.1% had children under the age of 18 living with them, 54.5% were married couples living together, 9.6% had a female householder with no husband present, and 33.3% were non-families. 29.5% of all households were made up of individuals, and 13.5% had someone living alone who was 65 years of age or older. The average household size was 2.39 and the average family size was 2.96.

26.5% of the population were under the age of 18, 9.7% from 18 to 24, 27.3% from 25 to 44, 20.9% from 45 to 64, and 15.5% who were 65 years of age or older. The median age was 35 years. For every 100 females, there were 92.3 males. For every 100 females age 18 and over, there were 91.6 males.

The median household income was $36,625 and the median family income was $39,722. Males had a median income of $32,232 versus $25,500 for females. The per capita income was $14,201. About 12.7% of families and 18.6% of the population were below the poverty line, including 26.9% of those under age 18 and 4.3% of those age 65 or over.

== Schools ==
Mercer County Junior High School is located in Joy, in the building that once housed the now defunct Westmer High School.
