= List of centenarians (Major League Baseball players) =

The following contains a list of Major League Baseball players who lived to the age of 100. For other baseball players and others associated with baseball who were centenarians, see List of centenarians (sportspeople). For other lists of centenarians, see lists of centenarians.

== Actuarial data ==
A study by the Metropolitan Life Insurance Company that assessed the vital statistics of more than 10,000 baseball players and general mortality rates in the United States concluded that players whose careers began between 1876 and 1900 experienced only 97% expected mortality, those who debuted between 1901 and 1930 had only 64% expected mortality, and those who debuted between 1931 and 1973 experienced only 55% of expected deaths. As early as the 1930s, big league players were exhibiting either a healthy worker effect or the health benefits of the rigorous fitness regimens of professional athletes, or both. However, in this study, vital data on baseball players were limited to those available in the 1974 Baseball Encyclopedia. Other smaller studies have shown similar results for players who debuted between 1911 and 1915 and between 1900 and 1939.

One large study examining major league ballplayers with debuts from 1902 and 2004 found that their expected lifespan was almost five years longer than average 20-year-old American males, and that career length was inversely associated with the risk of death, probably because those who play ball longer gained additional income, physical fitness, and training.

== MLB players who have reached age 100 years ==
All supercentenarians (above 110 years old)
Living

Name	Born	Died	Age	Team(s)	Ref.
Ralph Miller	March 15, 1873; Cincinnati, Ohio	May 7, 1973; Cincinnati, Ohio	100 years, 53 days	Brooklyn Bridegrooms (1898); Baltimore Orioles (1899)	
Charlie Emig	April 5, 1875; Cincinnati, Ohio	October 2, 1975; Oklahoma City, Oklahoma	100 years, 180 days	Louisville Colonels (1896)	
John Daley	May 25, 1887; Du Bois, Pennsylvania	August 31, 1988; Mansfield, Ohio	101 years, 98 days	St. Louis Browns (1912)	
Bill Otis	December 24, 1889; Scituate, Massachusetts	December 15, 1990; Duluth, Minnesota	100 years, 356 days	New York Highlanders (1912)	
Bob Wright	December 13, 1891; Decatur County, Indiana	July 30, 1993; Carmichael, California	101 years, 229 days	Chicago Cubs (1915)	
Ed Gill	August 7, 1895; Somerville, Massachusetts	October 10, 1995; Brockton, Massachusetts	100 years, 64 days	Washington Senators (1919)	
Milt Gaston	January 27, 1896; Ridgefield Park, New Jersey	April 26, 1996; Barnstable, Massachusetts	100 years, 90 days	New York Yankees (1924); St. Louis Browns (1925–1927); Washington Senators (1928); Boston Red Sox (1929–1931); Chicago White Sox (1932–1934)	
Red Hoff	May 8, 1891; Ossining, New York	September 17, 1998; Daytona Beach, Florida	107 years, 132 days	New York Highlanders (1911–1913); St. Louis Browns (1915)	
Karl Swanson	December 17, 1900; North Henderson, Illinois	April 3, 2002; Rock Island, Illinois	101 years, 107 days	Chicago White Sox (1928–1929)	
Ralph Erickson	June 25, 1902; Dubois, Idaho	June 27, 2002; Chandler, Arizona	100 years, 2 days	Pittsburgh Pirates (1929–1930)	
Ray Cunningham	January 17, 1905; Mesquite, Texas	July 30, 2005; Pearland, Texas	100 years, 194 days	St. Louis Cardinals (1931–1932)	
Howdy Groskloss	April 10, 1906; Pittsburgh, Pennsylvania	July 15, 2006; Vero Beach, Florida	100 years, 96 days	Pittsburgh Pirates (1930–1932)	
Silas Simmons	October 14, 1895; Middletown, Delaware	October 29, 2006; St. Petersburg, Florida	111 years, 15 days	Lincoln Giants (1926)	
Rollie Stiles	November 17, 1906; Ratcliff, Arkansas	July 22, 2007; St. Louis, Missouri	100 years, 247 days	St. Louis Browns (1930–1931, 1933)	
Billy Werber	June 20, 1908; Berwyn Heights, Maryland	January 22, 2009; Charlotte, North Carolina	100 years, 216 days	New York Yankees (1930–1933); Boston Red Sox (1933–1936); Philadelphia Athletics (1937–1938); Cincinnati Reds (1939–1941); New York Giants (1942)	
Tony Malinosky	October 7, 1909; Collinsville, Illinois	February 8, 2011; Oxnard, California	101 years, 124 days	Brooklyn Dodgers (1937)	
Millito Navarro	September 26, 1905; Patillas, Puerto Rico	April 30, 2011; Ponce, Puerto Rico	105 years, 216 days	Cuban Stars (East) (1928–1929)	
Ace Parker	May 17, 1912; Portsmouth, Virginia	November 6, 2013; Portsmouth, Virginia	101 years, 173 days	Philadelphia Athletics (1937–1938)	
Connie Marrero	April 25, 1911; Sagua La Grande, Cuba	April 23, 2014; Havana, Cuba	102 years, 363 days	Washington Senators (1950–1954)	
Mike Sandlock	October 17, 1915; Old Greenwich, Connecticut	April 4, 2016; Cos Cob, Connecticut	100 years, 170 days	Boston Braves (1942–1944); Brooklyn Dodgers (1945–1946); Pittsburgh Pirates (1953)	
Eddie Carnett	October 21, 1916; Springfield, Missouri	November 4, 2016; Ringling, Oklahoma	100 years, 14 days	Boston Braves (1941); Chicago White Sox (1944); Cleveland Indians (1945)	
Fred Caligiuri	October 22, 1918; West Hickory, Pennsylvania	November 30, 2018; Charlotte, North Carolina	100 years, 39 days	Philadelphia Athletics (1941–1942)	
Eddie Robinson	December 15, 1920; Paris, Texas	October 4, 2021; Bastrop, Texas	100 years, 293 days	Cleveland Indians (1942, 1946–1948, 1957); Washington Senators (1949–1950); Chicago White Sox (1950–1952); Philadelphia Athletics (1953); New York Yankees (1954–1956); Kansas City Athletics (1956); Detroit Tigers (1957); Baltimore Orioles (1957)	
George Elder	March 10, 1921; Lebanon, Kentucky	July 7, 2022; Fruita, Colorado	101 years, 119 days	St. Louis Browns (1949)	
Art Schallock	April 25, 1924; Mill Valley, California	March 6, 2025; Sonoma, California	100 years, 314 days	New York Yankees (1951–1955); Baltimore Orioles (1955)	
Bill Greason	September 3, 1924; Atlanta, Georgia	Living	102 years, 62 days	Birmingham Black Barons (1948); St. Louis Cardinals (1954)	
Bobby Shantz	September 26, 1925; Pottstown, Pennsylvania	Living	101 years, 39 days	Philadelphia/Kansas City Athletics (1949–1956); New York Yankees (1957–1960); Pittsburgh Pirates (1961); Houston Colt .45's (1962); St. Louis Cardinals (1962–1964); Chicago Cubs (1964); Philadelphia Phillies (1964)	
