= Swedona, Illinois =

- Census-designated place
- Location within Illinois Location within the United States
- Coordinates: 41°16′48″N 90°26′36″W
- Country: United States
- State: Illinois
- County: Mercer
- Township: Richland Grove

Area
  - Total: 0.28 sq mi (0.73 km^{2})
  - Land: 0.28 sq mi (0.73 km^{2})
  - Water: 0.0 sq mi (0 km^{2})
- Elevation: 715 ft (218 m)

Population (2020)
  - Total: 109
- Time zone: UTC-6 (Central (CST))
  - Summer (DST): UTC-5 (CDT)
- Area code: 309
- GNIS feature ID: 2806568

Swedona is an unincorporated community and census-designated place in Richland Grove Township, Mercer County, Illinois, United States. As of the 2020 census, it had a population of 109. Swedona is 5.5 miles (8.9 km) north of Windsor.

== Demographics ==
Swedona first appeared as a census designated place in the 2020 United States census.
