= Eliza, Illinois =

- Census-designated place
- Location within Illinois Location within the United States
- Coordinates: 41°17′41″N 90°58′21″W
- Country: United States
- State: Illinois
- County: Mercer
- Township: Eliza

Area
  - Total: 0.13 sq mi (0.33 km^{2})
  - Land: 0.13 sq mi (0.33 km^{2})
  - Water: 0 sq mi (0.00 km^{2})
- Elevation: 686 ft (209 m)

Population (2020)
  - Total: 25
  - Density: 197.3/sq mi (76.18/km^{2})
- Time zone: UTC-6 (Central (CST))
  - Summer (DST): UTC-5 (CDT)
- ZIP Code: 61272 (New Boston)
- Area code: 309
- FIPS code: 17-23139
- GNIS feature ID: 2806478

Eliza is an unincorporated community and census-designated place in Eliza Township, Mercer County, Illinois, United States. Eliza is 9 miles (14 km) north of New Boston. As of the 2020 census it had a population of 25.

== History ==
The Bishop family settled the town around the 1840s. The grandson John Bishop owned almost all of the town, including his own general store. He had been manager of the town band since 1914. The town also had a basketball team. Their church was named the Eliza Episcopal Church. By the late 1920s, the town had 53 acres (21 ha) of farmland along with a general store, drugstore, church, theater, dancehall, pool hall, and a barber shop, among houses and a few community buildings. On November 14, 1929, John Bishop auctioned off almost all the town, save for four houses. His reasons were not officially stated, but could have likely been due to the recent start of the Great Depression in late October. News of the auction was featured in newspapers as far away as Ohio, Iowa, and New Jersey.

== Geography ==
Eliza is in northwestern Mercer County, 10 miles (16 km) north of New Boston and 17 miles (27 km) northwest of Aledo, the county seat. It sits on a hilltop that drains east to Irwin Branch, a south-flowing tributary of Eliza Creek, which flows southwest to the Mississippi River at New Boston.

According to the United States Census Bureau, the Eliza CDP has an area of 0.13 square miles (0.34 km^{2}), all land.

== Demographics ==
Historical population
Census	Pop.	Note	%±
2020	25		—
U.S. Decennial Census

Eliza first appeared as a census designated place in the 2020 United States census.
