= Windsor, Mercer County, Illinois =

New Windsor, Illinois
- Village
- Village of Windsor
- Location in Mercer County, Illinois
- Coordinates: 41°12′07″N 90°26′40″W
- Country: United States
- State: Illinois
- County: Mercer
- Township: Rivoli Township

Area
  - Total: 0.44 sq mi (1.14 km^{2})
  - Land: 0.44 sq mi (1.14 km^{2})
  - Water: 0 sq mi (0.00 km^{2})
- Elevation: 801 ft (244 m)

Population (2020)
  - Total: 668
  - Density: 1,524.0/sq mi (588.41/km^{2})
- Time zone: UTC-6 (CST)
  - Summer (DST): UTC-5 (CDT)
- ZIP code: 61465
- Area code: 309
- FIPS code: 17-82309
- GNIS feature ID: 2399713

Windsor, also known as New Windsor, is a village in Rivoli Township, Mercer County, Illinois, United States. The population was 668 at the 2020 census, down from 748 in 2010. The official name is the "Village of Windsor", but "New Windsor" is the commonly used name, including by the New Windsor Fire Department and the US Postal Service (ZIP Code 61465).

== Geography ==
New Windsor is located on the eastern edge of Mercer County. The eastern border of the village is also the Henry County line.

Illinois Route 17 passes through the village as its Main Street. It leads west 7 miles (11 km) to Viola and 16 miles (26 km) to Aledo, the Mercer county seat, and east-southeast 8 miles (13 km) to Woodhull and Interstate 74.

According to the U.S. Census Bureau, the village has a total area of 0.44 square miles (1.1 km^{2}), all land. It sits on a low ridge that drains south to North Pope Creek and north to a tributary of Parker Run, which continues north to the Edwards River. Pope Creek and the Edwards are west-flowing direct tributaries of the Mississippi River.

== Demographics ==
Historical population
Census	Pop.	Note	%±
1870	379		—
1880	513		35.4%
1890	477		−7.0%
1900	473		−0.8%
1910	660		39.5%
1920	484		−26.7%
1930	444		−8.3%
1940	517		16.4%
1950	569		10.1%
1960	658		15.6%
1970	723		9.9%
1980	863		19.4%
1990	774		−10.3%
2000	720		−7.0%
2010	748		3.9%
2020	668		−10.7%
U.S. Decennial Census

As of the census of 2000, there were 720 people, 307 households, and 217 families residing in the village. The population density was 1,628.5 inhabitants per square mile (628.8/km^{2}). There were 335 housing units at an average density of 757.7 per square mile (292.5/km^{2}). The racial makeup of the village was 98.75% White, 0.28% Native American, 0.28% Asian, and 0.69% from two or more races. Hispanic or Latino of any race were 2.50% of the population.

There were 307 households, out of which 28.7% had children under the age of 18 living with them, 59.6% were married couples living together, 6.8% had a female householder with no husband present, and 29.3% were non-families. 28.0% of all households were made up of individuals, and 18.9% had someone living alone who was 65 years of age or older. The average household size was 2.35 and the average family size was 2.82.

In the village, the population was spread out, with 22.1% under the age of 18, 8.9% from 18 to 24, 24.4% from 25 to 44, 25.4% from 45 to 64, and 19.2% who were 65 years of age or older. The median age was 41 years. For every 100 females, there were 97.3 males. For every 100 females age 18 and over, there were 92.1 males.

The median income for a household in the village was $37,500, and the median income for a family was $41,094. Males had a median income of $30,556 versus $18,594 for females. The per capita income for the village was $19,811. About 6.1% of families and 7.8% of the population were below the poverty line, including 7.0% of those under age 18 and 10.3% of those age 65 or over.
