= Mercer County Fairgrounds =

- U.S. National Register of Historic Places
- U.S. Historic district
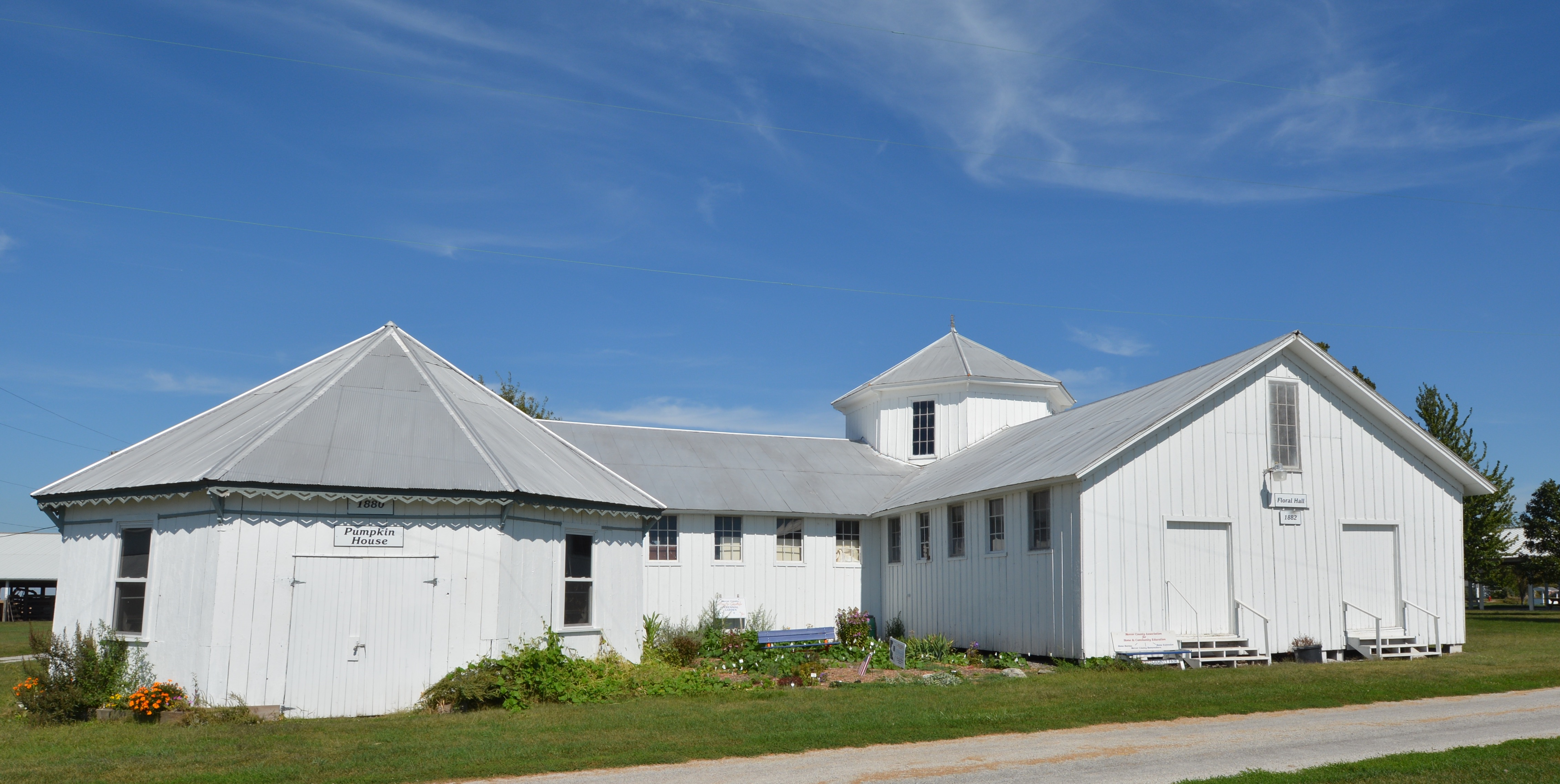

- Location within Illinois Location within the United States
- Location: 12th Ave., SW., .5 mi. S of jct. with IL 17, Aledo, Illinois
- Coordinates: 41°11′30″N 90°45′52″W
- Area: 52.4 acres (21.2 ha)
- NRHP reference No.: 97000380
- Added to NRHP: May 2, 1997

The Mercer County Fairgrounds, located on 12th Avenue SW in Aledo, are the home of the annual county fair in Mercer County, Illinois. The fairgrounds were established in 1869 when the fair moved to Aledo; from its creation in 1853 until then, it had taken place in Millersburg. The early fairs mainly focused on agricultural exhibitions, and the first two buildings were used for horticulture exhibits and household floral shows; these fairs also included entertainment such as baseball games and band concerts. By the end of the century, the fair had grown to host 8,000 visitors, many who came from neighboring counties by train, and show 3,000 entries in its various agricultural competitions. The fair added traveling entertainment and grew to host over 20,000 visitors in the 20th century; it is still held annually at the fairgrounds. In addition to the county fair, the fairgrounds have also held horse races, political events, picnics, and other community events.

The fairgrounds were added to the National Register of Historic Places on May 2, 1997.
