= Mannon, Illinois =

- Unincorporated community
- Location within Illinois Location within the United States
- Coordinates: 41°13′52″N 90°57′25″W
- Country: United States
- State: Illinois
- County: Mercer
- Elevation: 577 ft (176 m)
- Time zone: UTC-6 (Central (CST))
  - Summer (DST): UTC-5 (CDT)
- Area code: 309
- GNIS feature ID: 422933

Mannon is an unincorporated community in New Boston Township, Mercer County, Illinois, United States. Mannon is 4.5 miles (7.2 km) north-northwest of New Boston.
