= Commercial House (Keithsburg, Illinois) =

- U.S. National Register of Historic Places
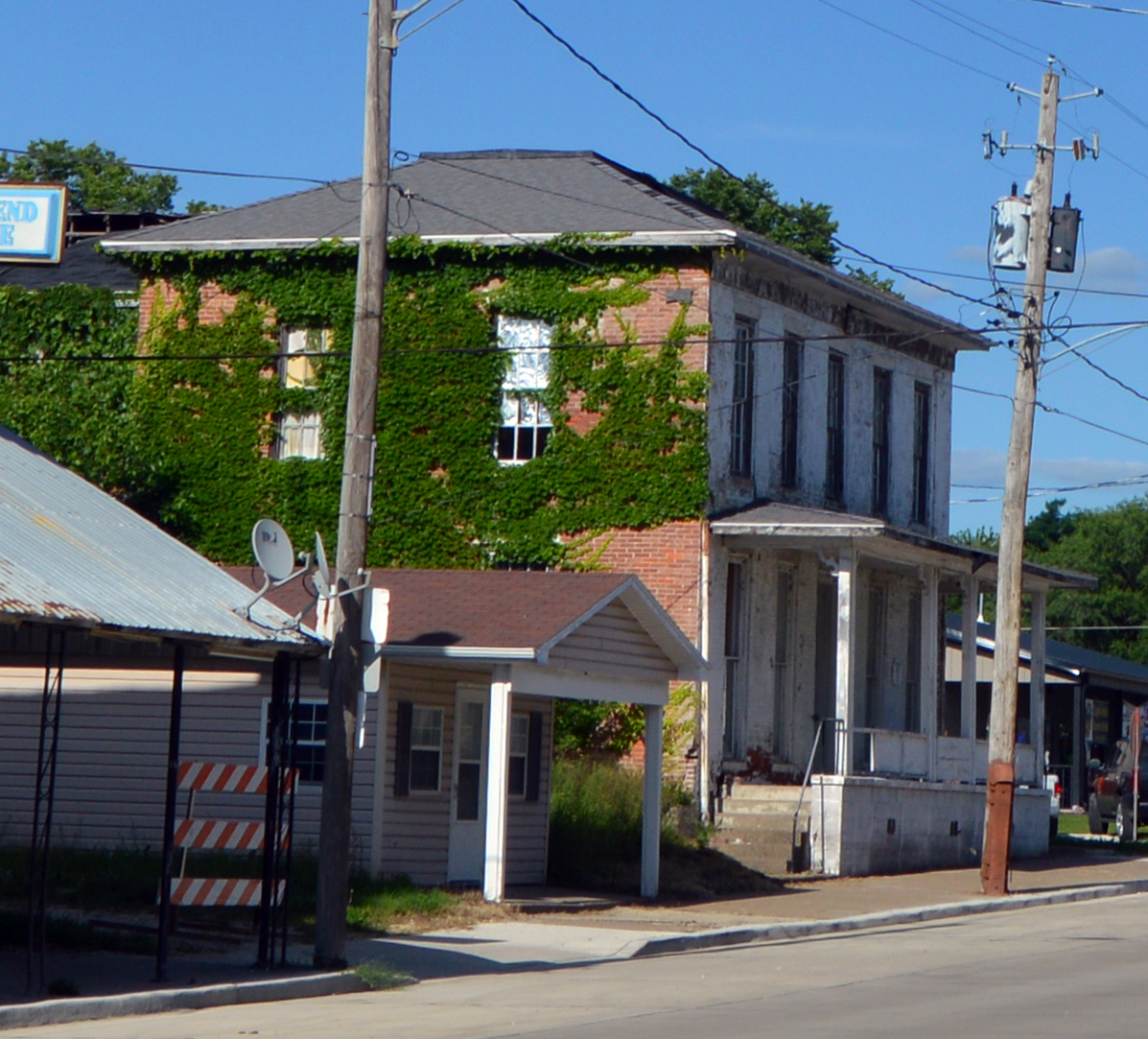

- Location within Illinois Location within the United States
- Location: 5th and Main St., Keithsburg, Illinois
- Coordinates: 41°6′3″N 90°56′31″W
- Area: Less than 1 acre (0.40 ha)
- Built: 1849
- Architectural style: Italianate
- NRHP reference No.: 83000332
- Added to NRHP: May 9, 1983

The Commercial House is a historic hotel located at the intersection of 5th and Main Streets in Keithsburg, Illinois. William J. Patterson built the hotel to be his own house in 1849; however, he sold it the next year to Samuel Phelps and moved to California, where he died. Indiana native David Wolfe purchased the building and opened it as a public house in 1875.

The hotel has an Italianate design which features segmental arched windows with ornamental hoods and a low hip roof with bracketed eaves. At the time of the hotel's construction, Keithsburg was the Mercer County seat, and the hotel hosted both visitors on political business and travelers on the Mississippi River. While the county seat moved to Aledo in 1857, the hotel still thrived on commercial traffic spurred by the river trade and the local sawmill industry. Both commercial activity in Keithsburg and the hotel's fortunes declined in the twentieth century, though the hotel enjoyed some success with recreational travelers.

The hotel was added to the National Register of Historic Places on May 9, 1983.

The hotel has been demolished.
