= Richland Grove Township, Mercer County, Illinois =

Coordinates: 41°16′36″N 90°29′37″W

Richland Grove Township
- Township
- Location in Mercer County

- Mercer County's location in Illinois
- Country: United States
- State: Illinois
- County: Mercer
- Established: November 8, 1853

Area
  - Total: 36.59 sq mi (94.8 km^{2})
  - Land: 36.34 sq mi (94.1 km^{2})
  - Water: 0.25 sq mi (0.65 km^{2}) 0.68%

Population (2010)
  - Estimate (2016): 2,186
  - Density: 63.3/sq mi (24.4/km^{2})
- Time zone: UTC-6 (CST)
  - Summer (DST): UTC-5 (CDT)
- FIPS code: 17-131-63628

Richland Grove Township is located in Mercer County, Illinois. As of the 2010 census, its population was 2,300 and it contained 965 housing units. It contains the census-designated places of Cable and Swedona.

== Geography ==
According to the 2010 census, the township has a total area of 36.59 square miles (94.8 km^{2}), of which 36.34 square miles (94.1 km^{2}) (or 99.32%) is land and 0.25 square miles (0.65 km^{2}) (or 0.68%) is water.

== Demographics ==
Historical population
Census	Pop.	Note	%±
2016 (est.)	2,186
U.S. Decennial Census
