= Parke Wilson =

American baseball player (1867–1934)

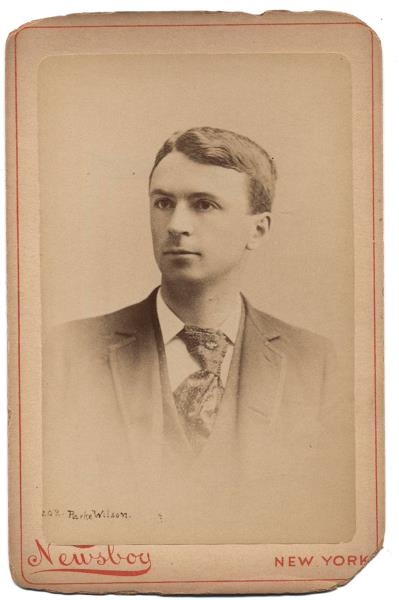
- Catcher
- Born: October 26, 1867; Keithsburg, Illinois, U.S.
- Died: December 20, 1934 (aged 67); Hermosa Beach, California, U.S.
- Batted: Right Threw: Right

MLB debut
- July 19, 1893, for the New York Giants

Last MLB appearance
- October 14, 1899, for the New York Giants

MLB statistics
- Batting average: .265
- Home runs: 3
- Runs batted in: 173
- Stats at Baseball Reference

Teams
- New York Giants (1893–1899)

Parke Asel Wilson (October 26, 1867 – December 20, 1934) was an American professional baseball player. He played all or part of seven seasons in Major League Baseball for the New York Giants of the National League (NL) from 1893 until 1899.

Wilson served as the team's backup catcher for majority of his playing career, first to Jack Doyle in 1893, then to Duke Farrell in 1894-95. He was the team's primary catcher in 1896, then was the backup to Jack Warner in 1897. After spending most of the 1898 season in the minor leagues with the Kansas City Blues, he returned in 1899, when he played much of his time at first base and other infield positions. He went on to play in the minors until 1906, spending the last four years in the Pacific Coast League.

Wilson died in Hermosa Beach, California at the age of 67, and is interred at Inglewood Park Cemetery in Inglewood, California.
