= Bob Wright (baseball) =

American baseball player (1891–1993)

- Pitcher
- Born: December 13, 1891; Decatur County, Indiana, U.S.
- Died: July 30, 1993 (aged 101); Carmichael, California, U.S.
- Batted: Right Threw: Right

MLB debut
- September 21, 1915, for the Chicago Cubs

Last MLB appearance
- September 24, 1915, for the Chicago Cubs

MLB statistics
- Win–loss record: 0-0
- Strikeouts: 3
- Earned run average: 2.25
- Stats at Baseball Reference

Teams
- Chicago Cubs (1915)

Robert Cassius Wright (December 13, 1891 – July 30, 1993) was an American right-handed professional baseball pitcher. He played two games in Major League Baseball for the Chicago Cubs in 1915. He was born in Decatur County, Indiana and died at the age of 101 in Carmichael, California.

== See also ==
- List of centenarians (Major League Baseball players)
