= Preemption, Illinois =

- Census-designated place
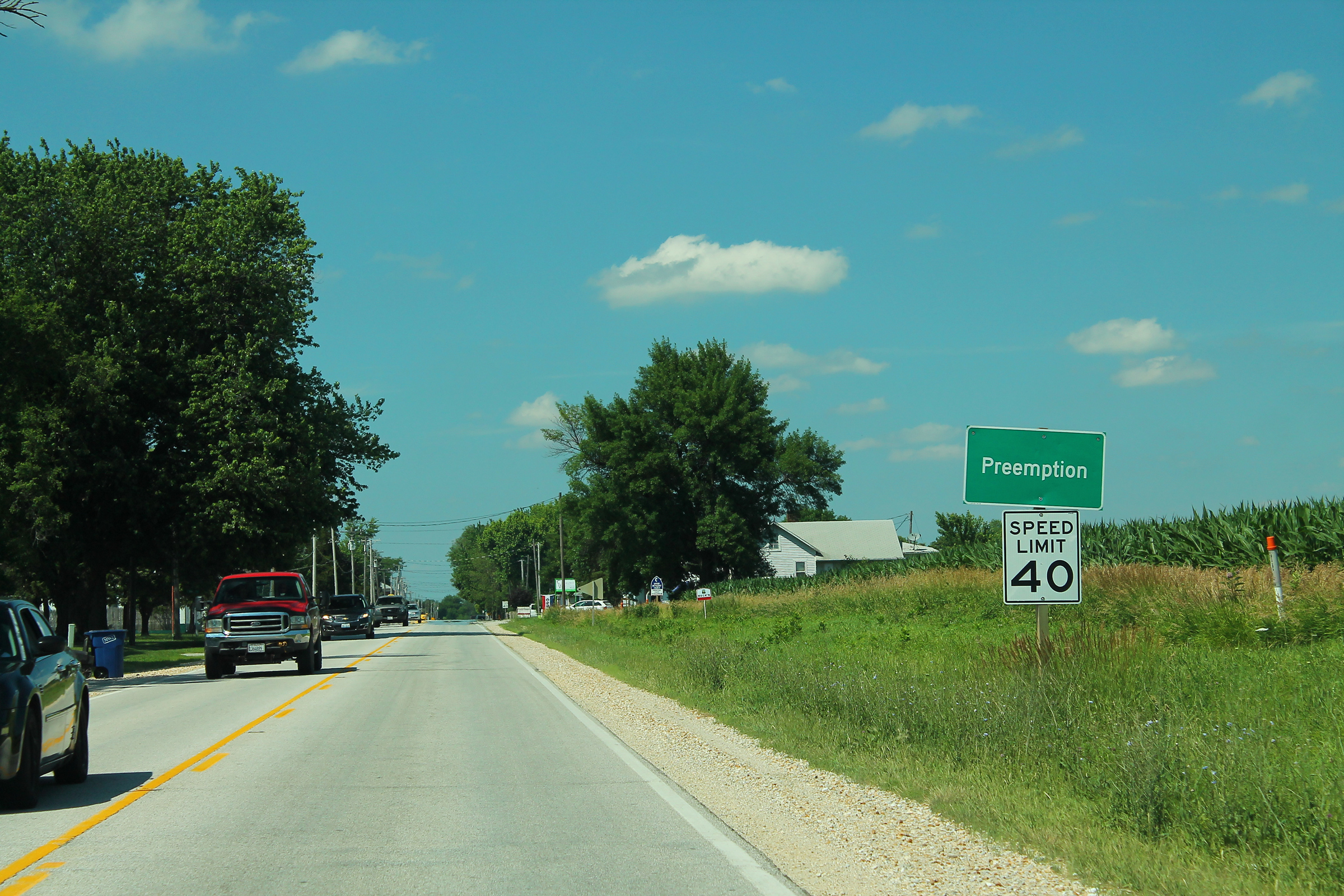
- Entering Preemption on U.S. Route 67

- Location within Illinois Location within the United States
- Coordinates: 41°18′46″N 90°35′04″W
- Country: United States
- State: Illinois
- County: Mercer
- Township: Preemption

Area
  - Total: 1.11 sq mi (2.88 km^{2})
  - Land: 1.11 sq mi (2.88 km^{2})
  - Water: 0 sq mi (0.00 km^{2})
- Elevation: 810 ft (250 m)

Population (2020)
  - Total: 254
  - Density: 228.7/sq mi (88.31/km^{2})
- Time zone: UTC-6 (Central (CST))
  - Summer (DST): UTC-5 (CDT)
- ZIP code: 61276
- Area code: 309
- GNIS feature ID: 2806546

Preemption is an unincorporated community and census-designated place in Preemption Township, Mercer County, Illinois, United States. As of the 2020 census, it had a population of 254. Preemption is 4 miles (6 km) west of Sherrard.

Roy James Carver (1909-1981), American philanthropist and businessman, was born in Preemption.

== Demographics ==
Historical population
Census	Pop.	Note	%±
2020	254		—
U.S. Decennial Census

Preemption first appeared as a census designated place in the 2020 U.S. census.
