= Ralph Erickson (baseball) =

American baseball player (1902–2002)

- Relief pitcher
- Born: June 25, 1902; Dubois, Idaho, U.S.
- Died: June 27, 2002 (aged 100); Chandler, Arizona, U.S.
- Batted: Left Threw: Left

MLB debut
- September 11, 1929, for the Pittsburgh Pirates

Last MLB appearance
- May 31, 1930, for the Pittsburgh Pirates

MLB statistics
- Win–loss record: 1–0
- Earned run average: 8.40
- Strikeouts: 2
- Stats at Baseball Reference

Teams
- Pittsburgh Pirates (1929–1930)

Ralph Lief Erickson (June 25, 1902 – June 27, 2002) was an American professional baseball relief pitcher who played from 1929 through 1930 in Major League Baseball. Listed at 6 ft 1 in (1.85 m), 175 lb, Erickson batted and threw left-handed. A native of Dubois, Idaho, he attended Idaho State University.

Erickson entered the majors in 1929 with the Pittsburgh Pirates, playing for them through the 1930 midseason. He posted a 1–0 record with an 8.40 earned run average in eight pitching appearances, allowing 15 runs (14 earned) on 23 hits while walking 12 batters and striking out two in 128 innings of work.

He also spent eight seasons in the minor leagues with the Pocatello Bannocks (1927), Boise Senators (1928), Columbia Comers (1929–30), Wichita Aviators (1930), Shreveport Sports (1931), Dallas Steers (1931–34) and St. Paul Saints (1934), registering a mark of 82–80 with a 3.40 ERA in 229 games, 54 of them as a starter.

Erickson was a longtime resident of Chandler, Arizona, where he died two days after his 100th birthday. At the time of his death, he was the oldest living former major league player.

== See also ==
- List of centenarians (Major League Baseball players)
- List of centenarians (sportspeople)

== Sources ==
Records
Preceded by Karl Swanson	Oldest recognized verified living baseball player April 3, 2002 – June 27, 2002	Succeeded by Ray Hayworth
