= National Communications Magazine =

US amateur radio magazine

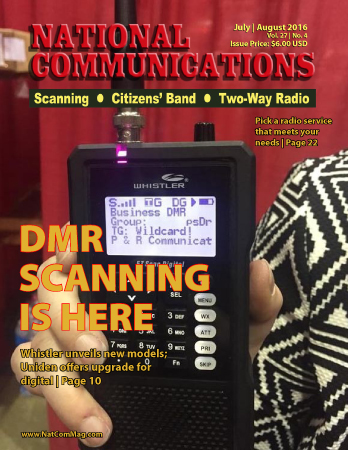
- Cover of the July–August 2016 PDF issue of National Communications Magazine
- Editor and publisher: Chuck Gysi (2014-present)
- Former editors: Norm Schrein (1988-2014)
- Frequency: Weekly
- Format: Weekly paid subscription website, bimonthly PDF online until April 2023, bimonthly print until 2013
- Publisher: SCAN Media LLC
- Founder: Norm Schrein
- Founded: 1988
- Final issue: 2023 (PDF), 2012 (print)
- Company: SCAN Media LLC
- Country: USA
- Based in: Aledo, Illinois
- Language: English
- Website: http://www.NatComMag.com
- ISSN: 2475-5478
- OCLC: 967777480

National Communications Magazine is a weekly publication that covers scanner radios, citizens band radio, the General Mobile Radio Service (GMRS), the Family Radio Service (FRS) and the Multi-Use Radio Service (MURS). It converted from a bimonthly online PDF publication to a paid newsletter in April 2023 and from print to online PDF publication at the end of 2012. The current editor and publisher is Chuck Gysi.

== Early history ==
National Communications Magazine traces its beginnings to 1988, when Norm Schrein of Ohio created a newsletter for radio enthusiasts. A four-page The Radiogram carried a date of September–October 1988 and carried articles about monitoring the high seas and Fox Marketing leaving the scanner radio business.

The September–October 1990 issue of the Bearcat Radio Club membership newsletter contained seven pages and articles about scanning cordless phones, frequency lists and questions from readers. The November–December 1990 issue was called Scanning Confidential and carried articles about aviation scanning, New York City scanning, frequency lists and new products. It contained 12 pages.

The March–April 1991 issue carried the title National Scanning Report and Norm Schrein was joined in the operation by Larry Miller of Pennsylvania. Miller served as editor while Schrein continued as president of the Bearcat Radio Club. The edition was labeled as Volume 2, Number 2 on its masthead and contained 36 pages.

The November–December 1993 issue dropped "Report" in its name and became National Scanning, or NatScan for short. The September–October 1995 issue was the last to carry Larry Miller's business listing in the publication and Jim Sutton was named the magazine's new editor in the November–December 1995 issue. The magazine began using color photos on its covers. The magazine still seemed to be produced by Larry Miller's business during this time, though.

The May–June 1996 issue of National Scanning saw the return of Larry Miller on the masthead with Joe Nooney as editor. The September–October 1997 issue of the magazine saw the last change in the name of the publication to National Communications, or Nat-Com. It still was being produced by Miller.

The July–August 1998 issue of National Communications showed that complete operation of the magazine was under Norm Schrein, with Larry Miller gone from the publication agreement. The publication not only was a benefit of the Bearcat Radio Club, but also the National Citizens Band Center, both operated by Schrein.

== Recent history ==
The July–August 2014 issue of National Communications (now nicknamed NatCom without the hyphen) saw two changes. Chuck Gysi, a writer for the magazine since 1996, became the publication's new owner, editor and publisher as Norm Schrein retired from the publication. In addition, the offices for the magazine were moved from Kettering, Ohio, to Aledo, Illinois.

In April 2023, the magazine discontinued PDF-produced issues on a bimonthly basis and started publishing articles multiple times per week through its new paywall subscription website on Substack. Content expanded to all hobby radio topics on the new site, including shortwave listening, AM/FM/TV DXing and FCC Part 15 low-power broadcasting.
