= Karl Swanson =

American baseball player (1900–2002)

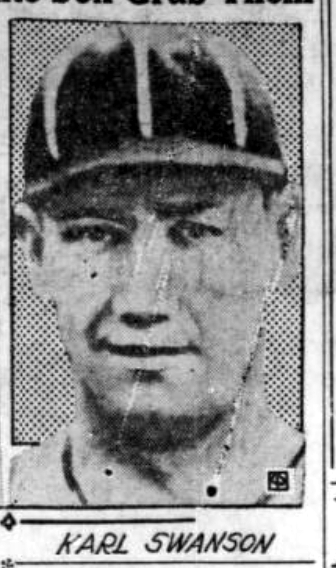
- Second baseman
- Born: December 17, 1900; North Henderson, Illinois, U.S.
- Died: April 3, 2002 (aged 101); Rock Island, Illinois, U.S.
- Batted: Left Threw: Right

MLB debut
- August 12, 1928, for the Chicago White Sox

Last MLB appearance
- May 5, 1929, for the Chicago White Sox

MLB statistics
- Batting average: .138
- Home runs: 0
- Runs batted in: 6
- Stats at Baseball Reference

Teams
- Chicago White Sox (1928–1929)

Karl Edward Swanson (December 17, 1900 – April 3, 2002) was an American professional baseball second baseman in Major League Baseball during parts of two seasons (1928 and 1929) for the Chicago White Sox.

== Baseball career ==
Born in North Henderson, Illinois in 1900, Swanson's first pro team was the 1923 Cedar Rapids Bunnies of the Mississippi Valley League, a Class D circuit where he played for the first six seasons of his career. In 1928, he batted .384 (third-highest in the league); in August, he was signed by the White Sox and installed as the club's second baseman. Although solid defensively, Swanson was baffled by big-league pitching and could only manage nine hits (eight singles and a double) in 65 at-bats, for a .138 average. (Swanson was also married that year, on June 16, to Lucille.) After a strong spring training in 1929, however, Swanson came north with the Sox but was used only sparingly, pinch hitting in two games before being returned to the minors in early May. Swanson knocked around the minors for several more years before ending up in the same place he began: with the Cedar Rapids Raiders of the Western League, in 1935.

In April 2001, to mark the 100th anniversary of the first American League game, Swanson threw the first pitch at Tropicana Field between the Tampa Bay Devil Rays and the Kansas City Royals.

== Personal life and death ==
Swanson married Lucile Stein in 1928. After retiring from baseball, he and his wife owned Swanson's Market in Rock Island, Illinois. Swanson turned 100 in 2000. Swanson died on April 3, 2002 at the age of 101 in Rock Island, Illinois. At the time of his death, Swanson was the oldest living former major league player.

== See also ==
- List of centenarians (Major League Baseball players)
- List of centenarians (sportspeople)

Records
Preceded by Ike Kahdot	Oldest recognized verified living baseball player March 31, 1999 – April 3, 2002	Succeeded by Ralph Erickson
