= Perryton Township, Mercer County, Illinois =

Coordinates: 41°16′37″N 90°43′18″W

Perryton Township
- Township
- Location in Mercer County

- Mercer County's location in Illinois
- Country: United States
- State: Illinois
- County: Mercer
- Established: November 8, 1853

Area
  - Total: 36.37 sq mi (94.2 km^{2})
  - Land: 36.35 sq mi (94.1 km^{2})
  - Water: 0.02 sq mi (0.052 km^{2}) 0.05%

Population (2010)
  - Estimate (2016): 452
  - Density: 13/sq mi (5.0/km^{2})
- Time zone: UTC-6 (CST)
  - Summer (DST): UTC-5 (CDT)
- FIPS code: 17-131-59182

Perryton Township is located in Mercer County, Illinois. As of the 2010 census, its population was 474 and it contained 200 housing units. It contains the census-designated place of Hamlet.

== Geography ==
According to the 2010 census, the township has a total area of 36.37 square miles (94.2 km^{2}), of which 36.35 square miles (94.1 km^{2}) (or 99.95%) is land and 0.02 square miles (0.052 km^{2}) (or 0.05%) is water.

== Demographics ==
Historical population
Census	Pop.	Note	%±
2016 (est.)	452
U.S. Decennial Census
