= Hamlet, Illinois =

- Census-designated place
- Location within Illinois Location within the United States
- Coordinates: 41°18′42″N 90°43′59″W
- Country: United States
- State: Illinois
- County: Mercer
- Township: Perryton

Area
  - Total: 0.44 sq mi (1.15 km^{2})
  - Land: 0.44 sq mi (1.15 km^{2})
  - Water: 0 sq mi (0.00 km^{2})
- Elevation: 807 ft (246 m)

Population (2020)
  - Total: 21
  - Density: 47.1/sq mi (18.19/km^{2})
- Time zone: UTC-6 (Central (CST))
  - Summer (DST): UTC-5 (CDT)
- ZIP Code: 61279 (Reynolds)
- Area code: 309
- GNIS feature ID: 2806494

Hamlet is an unincorporated community and census-designated place in Perryton Township, Mercer County, Illinois, United States. As of the 2020 census, it had a population of 21. Hamlet is located on Illinois Route 94, 3.5 miles (5.6 km) west-southwest of Reynolds.

== Demographics ==
Historical population
Census	Pop.	Note	%±
2020	21		—
U.S. Decennial Census

Hamlet first appeared as a census designated place in the 2020 United States census.
