= Verdurette =

- U.S. National Register of Historic Places
- Location within Illinois Location within the United States
- Location: 665 65th Ave., New Boston, Illinois
- Coordinates: 41°09′59″N 90°57′44″W
- Built: 1855
- Architectural style: Gothic Revival
- NRHP reference No.: 100005658
- Added to NRHP: June 17, 2021

Verdurette is a historic farmstead at 665 65th Avenue in New Boston, Illinois. The farm was added to the National Register of Historic Places on June 17, 2021.

== Architecture ==
The farm was established by William Drury, an early settler of New Boston who claimed the land in 1833. In addition to running his farm, Drury also operated a grocery store and a bank, and he served as county clerk and as a local postmaster. Drury built the farm's Gothic Revival farmhouse in 1855; the house features a large gable above the entrance with elaborate wooden trim. A Colonial Revival front porch was added to the house by 1909. The farm also includes a Gothic Revival bank barn, a second barn, a summer kitchen, a carriage house, a windmill, and a poultry coop.
