= New Boston Township, Mercer County, Illinois =

Coordinates: 41°12′07″N 90°59′41″W

New Boston Township
- Township
- Location in Mercer County

- Mercer County's location in Illinois
- Country: United States
- State: Illinois
- County: Mercer
- Established: November 8, 1853

Area
  - Total: 53.72 sq mi (139.1 km^{2})
  - Land: 50.66 sq mi (131.2 km^{2})
  - Water: 3.06 sq mi (7.9 km^{2}) 5.70%

Population (2010)
  - Estimate (2016): 1,139
  - Density: 23.8/sq mi (9.2/km^{2})
- Time zone: UTC-6 (CST)
  - Summer (DST): UTC-5 (CDT)
- FIPS code: 17-131-52233

New Boston Township is located in Mercer County, Illinois. As of the 2010 census, its population was 1,204 and it contained 603 housing units.

== Geography ==
According to the 2010 census, the township has a total area of 53.72 square miles (139.1 km^{2}), of which 50.66 square miles (131.2 km^{2}) (or 94.30%) is land and 3.06 square miles (7.9 km^{2}) (or 5.70%) is water.

== Demographics ==
Historical population
Census	Pop.	Note	%±
2016 (est.)	1,139
U.S. Decennial Census
