= Viola, Illinois =

- Village
- Location in Mercer County, Illinois

- Location in the United States
- Coordinates: 41°12′19″N 90°35′11″W
- Country: United States
- State: Illinois
- County: Mercer
- Township: Greene

Area
  - Total: 0.85 sq mi (2.21 km^{2})
  - Land: 0.84 sq mi (2.17 km^{2})
  - Water: 0.015 sq mi (0.04 km^{2})
- Elevation: 795 ft (242 m)

Population (2020)
  - Total: 869
  - Density: 1,037.2/sq mi (400.45/km^{2})
- Time zone: UTC-6 (CST)
  - Summer (DST): UTC-5 (CDT)
- ZIP code: 61486
- Area code: 309
- FIPS code: 17-78123
- GNIS feature ID: 2400073
- Website: villageofviola.org

Viola (pronounced vy-OLA) is a village in Mercer County, Illinois, United States. The population was 869 at the 2020 census, a decline of 9 percent from 955 in 2010.

== Geography ==
Viola is in eastern Mercer County at the junction of U.S. Route 67 and Illinois Route 17. US 67 passes through the village on 13th Street, leading north 22 miles (35 km) to Rock Island and south the same distance to Monmouth. IL 17 follows 17th Avenue through the village, crossing 13th Street at the village's center. IL 17 leads west 8 miles (13 km) to Aledo, the Mercer county seat, and east 7 miles (11 km) to New Windsor. Galesburg is 27 miles (43 km) to the southeast.

According to the U.S. Census Bureau, Viola has a total area of 0.85 square miles (2.20 km^{2}), of which 0.02 square miles (0.05 km^{2}), or 1.76%, are water. The village drains south to tributaries of Pope Creek and north to Skunk Creek, a tributary of the Edwards River. Pope Creek and the Edwards River are west-flowing direct tributaries of the Mississippi River.

== Demographics ==
Historical population
Census	Pop.	Note	%±
1870	407		—
1880	370		−9.1%
1890	421		13.8%
1900	552		31.1%
1910	760		37.7%
1920	668		−12.1%
1930	566		−15.3%
1940	743		31.3%
1950	826		11.2%
1960	812		−1.7%
1970	946		16.5%
1980	1,144		20.9%
1990	964		−15.7%
2000	956		−0.8%
2010	955		−0.1%
2020	869		−9.0%
U.S. Decennial Census

As of the census of 2000, there were 956 people, 383 households, and 274 families residing in the village. The population density was 1,155.8 inhabitants per square mile (446.3/km^{2}). There were 401 housing units at an average density of 484.8 per square mile (187.2/km^{2}). The racial makeup of the village was 98.22% White, 0.84% from other races, and 0.94% from two or more races. Hispanic or Latino of any race were 1.78% of the population.

There were 383 households, out of which 32.6% had children under the age of 18 living with them, 60.1% were married couples living together, 8.9% had a female householder with no husband present, and 28.2% were non-families. 26.1% of all households were made up of individuals, and 13.1% had someone living alone who was 65 years of age or older. The average household size was 2.50 and the average family size was 3.03.

In the village, the population was spread out, with 25.5% under the age of 18, 6.7% from 18 to 24, 29.3% from 25 to 44, 23.5% from 45 to 64, and 15.0% who were 65 years of age or older. The median age was 38 years. For every 100 females, there were 90.8 males. For every 100 females age 18 and over, there were 87.4 males.

The median income for a household in the village was $41,161, and the median income for a family was $47,159. Males had a median income of $36,458 versus $20,556 for females. The per capita income for the village was $18,127. About 7.4% of families and 8.5% of the population were below the poverty line, including 10.4% of those under age 18 and 10.1% of those age 65 or over.
