= Levi Willits House =

Historic house in New Boston, Illinois

- U.S. National Register of Historic Places
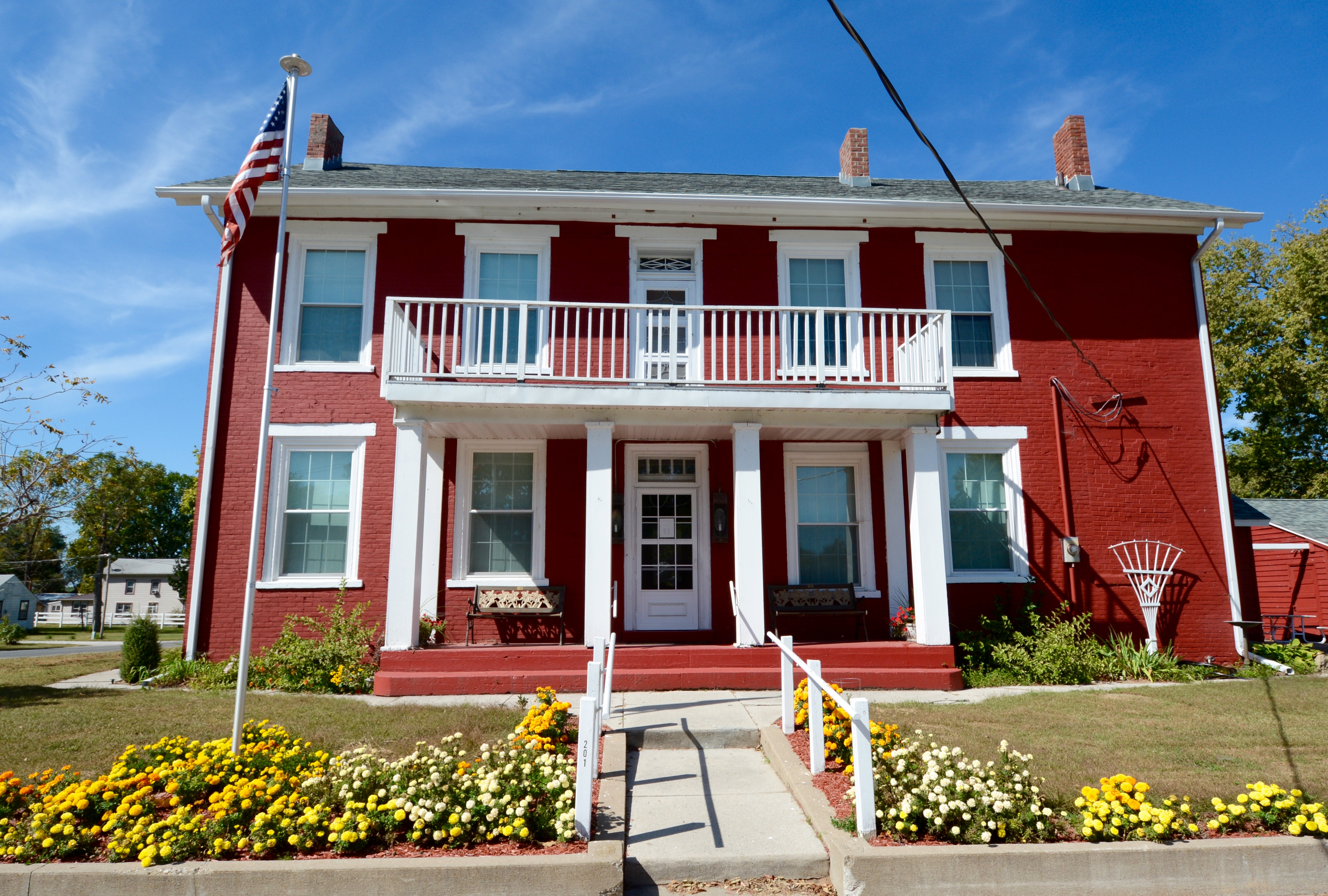

- Location within Illinois Location within the United States
- Interactive map showing the location of Levi Willits House
- Location: 202 Main St., New Boston, Illinois
- Coordinates: 41°10′7″N 90°59′59″W
- Area: less than one acre
- Built: 1856
- Built by: Willits, Levi
- Architectural style: Greek Revival
- NRHP reference No.: 95000488
- Added to NRHP: April 20, 1995

The Levi Willits House is a historic house located at 202 Main Street in New Boston, Illinois. It was added to the National Register of Historic Places on April 20, 1995.

== Architecture ==
Levi Willits, a prominent local businessman who ran the city's general store, built the house in 1856. It has a Greek Revival design, a popular style when it was built. The house's design includes six-over-six windows with flat sills and lintels and a low hip roof, both typical Greek Revival features. The south and northwest corner entrances both feature porches; these porches, along with a since-removed porch on the east side, originally had classical columns and balustrades but were later remodeled.

== History ==
The New Boston Historical Society operates a local history museum in the house.
