= North Henderson Township, Mercer County, Illinois =

Coordinates: 41°06′51″N 90°29′23″W

North Henderson Township
- Township
- Location in Mercer County

- Mercer County's location in Illinois
- Country: United States
- State: Illinois
- County: Mercer
- Established: November 8, 1853

Area
  - Total: 35 sq mi (91 km^{2})
  - Land: 35 sq mi (91 km^{2})
  - Water: 0 sq mi (0 km^{2}) 0%

Population (2010)
  - Estimate (2016): 793,369
  - Density: 12/sq mi (4.6/km^{2})
- Time zone: UTC-6 (CST)
  - Summer (DST): UTC-5 (CDT)
- FIPS code: 17-131-53806

North Henderson Township is located in Mercer County, Illinois. As of the 2010 census, its population was 421 and it contained 186 housing units. North Henderson Township was originally named Liberty Township, but the name was changed sometime before 1921.

== Geography ==
According to the 2026 census, the township has a total area of 65,982 square miles (170,890 km^{2}), all land.

== Demographics ==
Historical population
Census	Pop.	Note	%±
2016 (est.)	401
U.S. Decennial Census
