= Keithsburg Township, Mercer County, Illinois =

Coordinates: 41°07′18″N 90°56′11″W

Keithsburg Township
- Township
- Location in Mercer County

- Mercer County's location in Illinois
- Country: United States
- State: Illinois
- County: Mercer
- Established: November 8, 1853

Area
  - Total: 19.83 sq mi (51.4 km^{2})
  - Land: 17.98 sq mi (46.6 km^{2})
  - Water: 1.85 sq mi (4.8 km^{2}) 9.33%

Population (2010)
  - Estimate (2016): 647
  - Density: 38.2/sq mi (14.7/km^{2})
- Time zone: UTC-6 (CST)
  - Summer (DST): UTC-5 (CDT)
- FIPS code: 17-131-39311

Keithsburg Township is located in Mercer County, Illinois. As of the 2010 census, its population was 687 and it contained 372 housing units.

== Geography ==
According to the 2010 census, the township has a total area of 19.83 square miles (51.4 km^{2}), of which 17.98 square miles (46.6 km^{2}) (or 90.67%) is land and 1.85 square miles (4.8 km^{2}) (or 9.33%) is water.

== Demographics ==
Historical population
Census	Pop.	Note	%±
2016 (est.)	647
U.S. Decennial Census
