= Duncan Township, Mercer County, Illinois =

Coordinates: 41°17′01″N 90°50′46″W

Duncan Township
- Township
- Location in Mercer County

- Mercer County's location in Illinois
- Country: United States
- State: Illinois
- County: Mercer
- Established: November 8, 1853

Area
  - Total: 36.66 sq mi (94.9 km^{2})
  - Land: 36.65 sq mi (94.9 km^{2})
  - Water: 0 sq mi (0 km^{2}) 0%

Population (2010)
  - Estimate (2016): 259
  - Density: 7.4/sq mi (2.9/km^{2})
- Time zone: UTC-6 (CST)
  - Summer (DST): UTC-5 (CDT)
- FIPS code: 17-131-20968

Duncan Township is located in Mercer County, Illinois. As of the 2010 census, its population was 272 and it contained 124 housing units.

Duncan Township bears the name of Buford Duncan, a pioneer settler.

Educational Attainment: 16.4% Bachelor's Degree or Higher in Duncan township, Mercer County, Illinois

== Geography ==
According to the 2010 census, the township has a total area of 36.66 square miles (94.9 km^{2}), all land.

== Demographics ==
Historical population
Census	Pop.	Note	%±
2016 (est.)	259
U.S. Decennial Census

=== Age and Sex: ===
- 48.8 Median Age in Duncan township, Mercer County, Illinois.
- 35.3 65 Years and Older in Duncan township, Mercer County, Illinois.
