= Eliza Township, Mercer County, Illinois =

Coordinates: 41°17′17″N 90°59′30″W

Eliza Township
- Township
- Location in Mercer County

- Mercer County's location in Illinois
- Country: United States
- State: Illinois
- County: Mercer
- Established: November 8, 1853

Area
  - Total: 59.56 sq mi (154.3 km^{2})
  - Land: 57.35 sq mi (148.5 km^{2})
  - Water: 2.2 sq mi (5.7 km^{2}) 3.69%

Population (2010)
  - Estimate (2016): 399
  - Density: 7.3/sq mi (2.8/km^{2})
- Time zone: UTC-6 (CST)
  - Summer (DST): UTC-5 (CDT)
- FIPS code: 17-131-23152

Eliza Township is located in Mercer County, Illinois in the United States. As of the 2010 census, its population was 419 and it contained 188 housing units. It contains the census-designated place of Eliza.

== Geography ==
According to the 2010 census, the township has a total area of 59.56 square miles (154.3 km^{2}), of which 57.35 square miles (148.5 km^{2}) (or 96.29%) is land and 2.2 square miles (5.7 km^{2}) (or 3.69%) is water.

== Demographics ==
Historical population
Census	Pop.	Note	%±
2016 (est.)	399
U.S. Decennial Census
