= Ohio Grove Township, Mercer County, Illinois =

Coordinates: 41°07′09″N 90°43′22″W

Ohio Grove Township
- Township
- Location in Mercer County

- Mercer County's location in Illinois
- Country: United States
- State: Illinois
- County: Mercer
- Established: November 8, 1853

Area
  - Total: 36.81 sq mi (95.3 km^{2})
  - Land: 36.81 sq mi (95.3 km^{2})
  - Water: 0 sq mi (0 km^{2}) 0%

Population (2010)
  - Estimate (2016): 266
  - Density: 7.6/sq mi (2.9/km^{2})
- Time zone: UTC-6 (CST)
  - Summer (DST): UTC-5 (CDT)
- FIPS code: 17-131-55405

Ohio Grove Township is located in Mercer County, Illinois. As of the 2010 census, its population was 279 and it contained 116 housing units. Ohio Grove Township changed its name from Ohio sometime after 1921.

== Geography ==
According to the 2010 census, the township has a total area of 36.81 square miles (95.3 km^{2}), all land.

== Demographics ==
Historical population
Census	Pop.	Note	%±
2016 (est.)	266
U.S. Decennial Census
