= Suez Township, Mercer County, Illinois =

Coordinates: 41°06′44″N 90°36′29″W

Suez Township
- Township
- Location in Mercer County

- Mercer County's location in Illinois
- Country: United States
- State: Illinois
- County: Mercer
- Established: November 8, 1853

Area
  - Total: 37.11 sq mi (96.1 km^{2})
  - Land: 37.11 sq mi (96.1 km^{2})
  - Water: 0 sq mi (0 km^{2}) 0%

Population (2010)
  - Estimate (2016): 567
  - Density: 16/sq mi (6.2/km^{2})
- Time zone: UTC-6 (CST)
  - Summer (DST): UTC-5 (CDT)
- FIPS code: 17-131-73339

Suez Township is located in Mercer County, Illinois. As of the 2010 census, its population was 595 and it contained 277 housing units. Suez Township changed its name from Palmyra Township sometime before 1921.

== Geography ==
According to the 2010 census, the township has a total area of 37.11 square miles (96.1 km^{2}), all land.

== Demographics ==
Historical population
Census	Pop.	Note	%±
2016 (est.)	567
U.S. Decennial Census
