= Gideon Ives House =

Historic house in Illinois, United States

- U.S. National Register of Historic Places
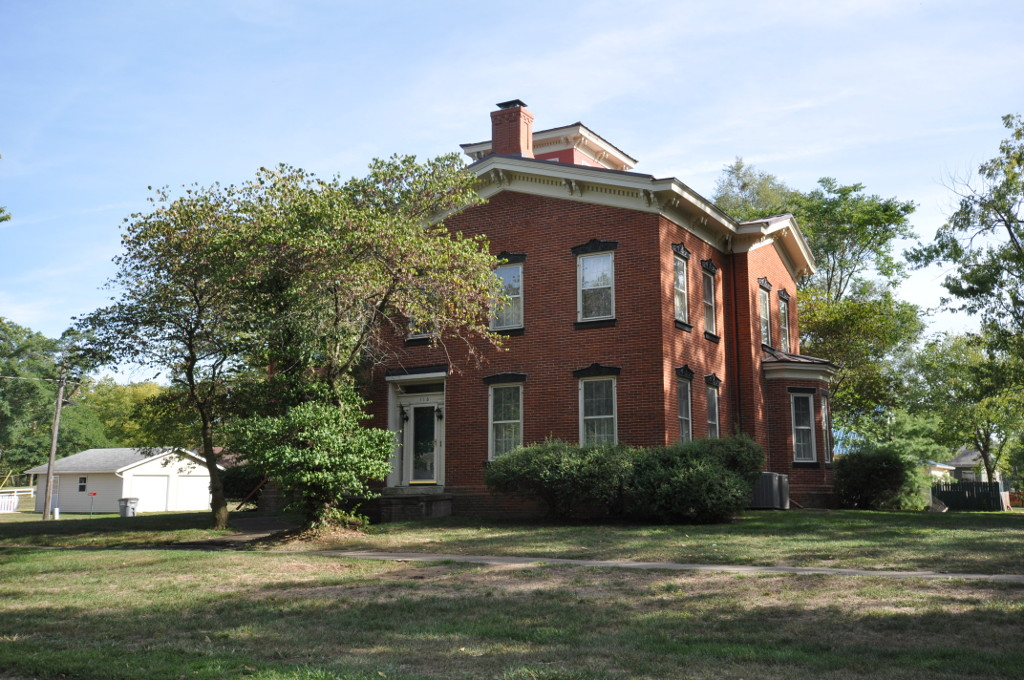

- Location within Illinois Location within the United States
- Location: 110 E. Jefferson St., New Boston, Illinois
- Coordinates: 41°10′10″N 90°59′39″W
- Area: 0.5 acres (0.20 ha)
- Built: 1857
- Architectural style: Italianate
- NRHP reference No.: 00001332
- Added to NRHP: November 8, 2000

The Gideon Ives House is a historic house at 110 East Jefferson Street in New Boston, Illinois. The house was added to the National Register of Historic Places on November 8, 2000.

== Architecture ==
Gideon Ives, the co-owner of Mercer County's largest general merchandise and grain wholesale business, had the house built for his family in 1857. The house is an early example of the Italianate style; its design mirrors the house across the street, which was built for Ives' business partner, Elmore J. Dennison. The house's roof features bracketed eaves and is topped by a square cupola, and its windows are tall and narrow with cast iron hoods. The entrance is flanked by pilasters, a Greek Revival element; the style was still popular at the time, and its presence reflects the transition between Greek Revival and Italianate as popular American architectural styles.
