= Abington Township, Mercer County, Illinois =

Abington Township
- Township
- Location in Mercer County

- Mercer County's location in Illinois
- Coordinates: 41°06′47″N 90°50′05″W
- Country: United States
- State: Illinois
- County: Mercer
- Established: November 8, 1853

Area
  - Total: 36.64 sq mi (94.9 km^{2})
  - Land: 36.64 sq mi (94.9 km^{2})
  - Water: 0 sq mi (0 km^{2}) 0%

Population (2010)
  - Estimate (2016): 373
  - Density: 10.7/sq mi (4.1/km^{2})
- Time zone: UTC-6 (CST)
  - Summer (DST): UTC-5 (CDT)
- FIPS code: 17-131-00126

Abington Township is located in Mercer County, Illinois. As of the 2010 census, its population was 392 and it contained 175 housing units.

== Geography ==
According to the 2010 census, the township has a total area of 36.64 square miles (94.9 km^{2}), all land.

== Demographics ==
Historical population
Census	Pop.	Note	%±
2020	365		—
U.S. Decennial Census
