= Mercer Township, Mercer County, Illinois =

Coordinates: 41°11′51″N 90°43′24″W

Mercer Township
- Township
- Location in Mercer County

- Mercer County's location in Illinois
- Country: United States
- State: Illinois
- County: Mercer
- Established: November 8, 1853

Area
  - Total: 35.47 sq mi (91.9 km^{2})
  - Land: 35.42 sq mi (91.7 km^{2})
  - Water: 0.05 sq mi (0.13 km^{2}) 0.14%

Population (2010)
  - Estimate (2016): 3,923
  - Density: 114.9/sq mi (44.4/km^{2})
- Time zone: UTC-6 (CST)
  - Summer (DST): UTC-5 (CDT)
- FIPS code: 17-131-48398

Mercer Township is located in Mercer County, Illinois. As of the 2010 census, its population was 4,071 and it contained 1,873 housing units. Mercer Township changed its name from Centre Township on an unknown date sometime before 1921. Mercer Township contains Aledo, the county seat of Mercer County.

== Geography ==
According to the 2010 census, the township has a total area of 35.47 square miles (91.9 km^{2}), of which 35.42 square miles (91.7 km^{2}) (or 99.86%) is land and 0.05 square miles (0.13 km^{2}) (or 0.14%) is water.

== Demographics ==
Historical population
Census	Pop.	Note	%±
2016 (est.)	3,923
U.S. Decennial Census
