= Preemption Township, Mercer County, Illinois =

Coordinates: 41°17′04″N 90°36′36″W

Preemption Township
- Township
- Location in Mercer County

- Mercer County's location in Illinois
- Country: United States
- State: Illinois
- County: Mercer
- Established: November 8, 1853

Area
  - Total: 36.88 sq mi (95.5 km^{2})
  - Land: 36.85 sq mi (95.4 km^{2})
  - Water: 0.03 sq mi (0.078 km^{2}) 0.08%

Population (2010)
  - Estimate (2016): 1,683
  - Density: 48.4/sq mi (18.7/km^{2})
- Time zone: UTC-6 (CST)
  - Summer (DST): UTC-5 (CDT)
- FIPS code: 17-131-61795
- Website: preemptiontownship.com

Preemption Township is located in Mercer County, Illinois. As of the 2010 census, its population was 1,783 and it contained 737 housing units. It contains the census-designated place of Preemption. Preemption Township changed its name from Fairfield Township sometime before 1921.

== Geography ==
According to the 2010 census, the township has a total area of 36.88 square miles (95.5 km^{2}), of which 36.85 square miles (95.4 km^{2}) (or 99.92%) is land and 0.03 square miles (0.078 km^{2}) (or 0.08%) is water.

== Demographics ==
Historical population
Census	Pop.	Note	%±
2016 (est.)	1,683
U.S. Decennial Census
