= Greene Township, Mercer County, Illinois =

Coordinates: 41°12′09″N 90°36′40″W

Greene Township
- Township
- Location in Mercer County

- Mercer County's location in Illinois
- Country: United States
- State: Illinois
- County: Mercer
- Established: November 8, 1853

Area
  - Total: 36.74 sq mi (95.2 km^{2})
  - Land: 36.72 sq mi (95.1 km^{2})
  - Water: 0.02 sq mi (0.052 km^{2}) 0.05%

Population (2010)
  - Estimate (2016): 1,563
  - Density: 44.7/sq mi (17.3/km^{2})
- Time zone: UTC-6 (CST)
  - Summer (DST): UTC-5 (CDT)
- FIPS code: 17-131-31342

Greene Township is located in Mercer County, Illinois. As of the 2010 census, its population was 1,640 and it contained 692 housing units.

== Geography ==
According to the 2010 census, the township has a total area of 36.74 square miles (95.2 km^{2}), of which 36.72 square miles (95.1 km^{2}) (or 99.95%) is land and 0.02 square miles (0.052 km^{2}) (or 0.05%) is water.

== Demographics ==
Historical population
Census	Pop.	Note	%±
2016 (est.)	1,563
U.S. Decennial Census
