= Keithsburg, Illinois =

- City
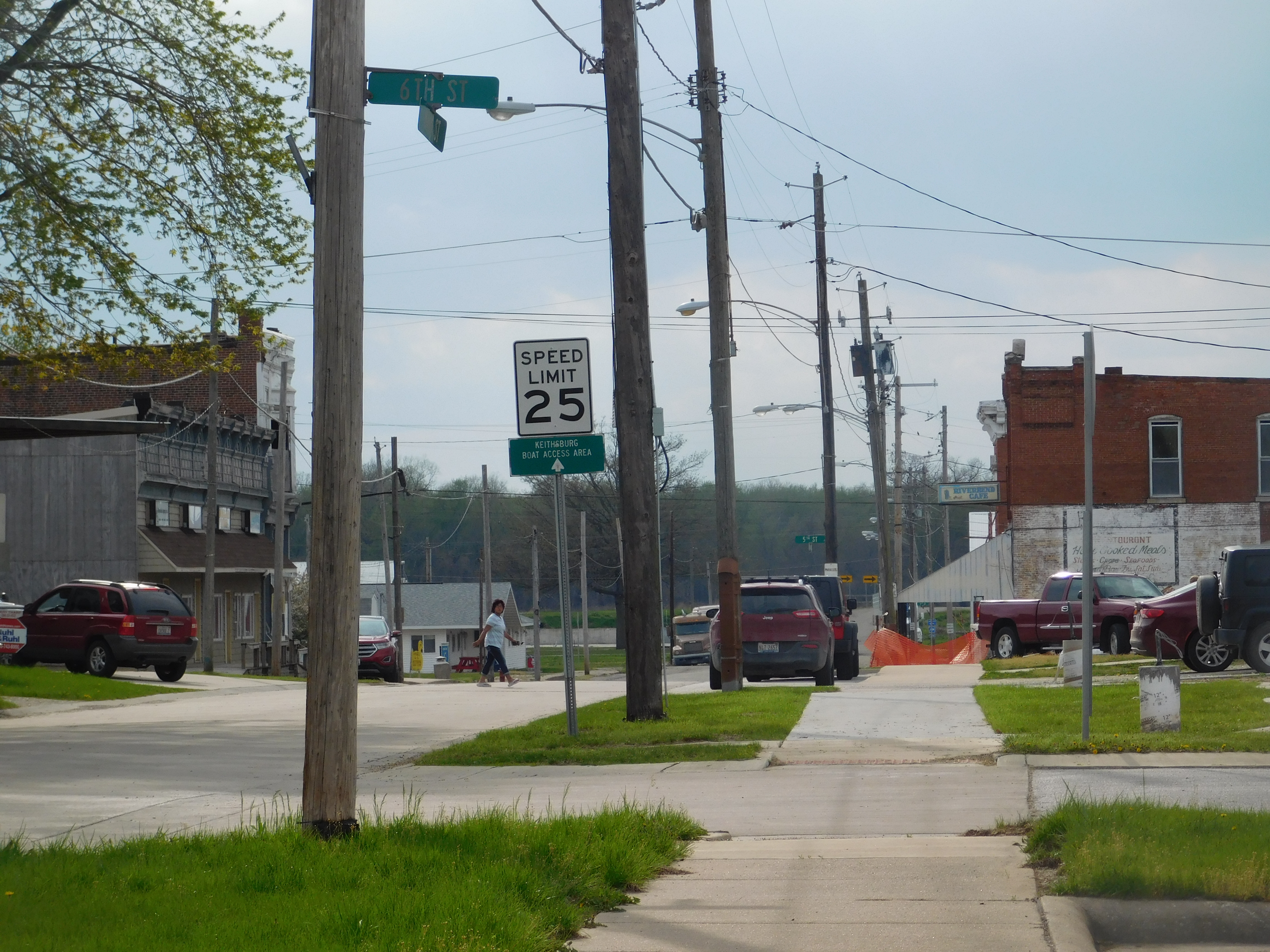
- Downtown Keithsburg in April 2017

- Location in Mercer County, Illinois

- Location in the United States
- Coordinates: 41°06′01″N 90°56′07″W
- Country: United States
- State: Illinois
- County: Mercer
- Township: Keithsburg

Area
  - Total: 3.18 sq mi (8.23 km^{2})
  - Land: 2.56 sq mi (6.63 km^{2})
  - Water: 0.62 sq mi (1.61 km^{2})
- Elevation: 545 ft (166 m)

Population (2020)
  - Total: 550
  - Density: 215.0/sq mi (83.01/km^{2})
- Time zone: UTC−6 (CST)
  - Summer (DST): UTC−5 (CDT)
- ZIP code: 61442
- Area code: 309
- FIPS code: 17-39298
- GNIS feature ID: 2395499
- Website: www.cityofkeithsburg.com

Keithsburg is a city in Mercer County, Illinois, United States, on the Mississippi River. The population was 550 at the 2020 census, down from 609 in 2010. It was named for Robert Keith, a pioneer settler. Due to a flood in 1993, there isn't much to do in Keithsburg. Some of the things that are still in use today include, a bar/restaurant named “The Eagles Nest”, and one or two playgrounds.

== Geography ==
Keithsburg is located in southwestern Mercer County. It is sited on the east bank of the Mississippi River, downstream from the inlet of Pope Creek.

Keithsburg is 16 miles (26 km) southwest of Aledo, the Mercer county seat, and 27 miles (43 km) northwest of Monmouth. The closest highway crossings of the Mississippi are 26 miles (42 km) to the south, at Burlington, Iowa, and 25 miles (40 km) to the north, at Muscatine, Iowa.

According to the U.S. Census Bureau, Keithsburg has a total area of 3.181 square miles (8.24 km^{2}), of which 2.56 square miles (6.63 km^{2}) are land and 0.621 square miles (1.61 km^{2}), or 19.53%, are water.

The Keithsburg Division of the Mark Twain National Wildlife Refuge Complex lies north of Keithsburg.

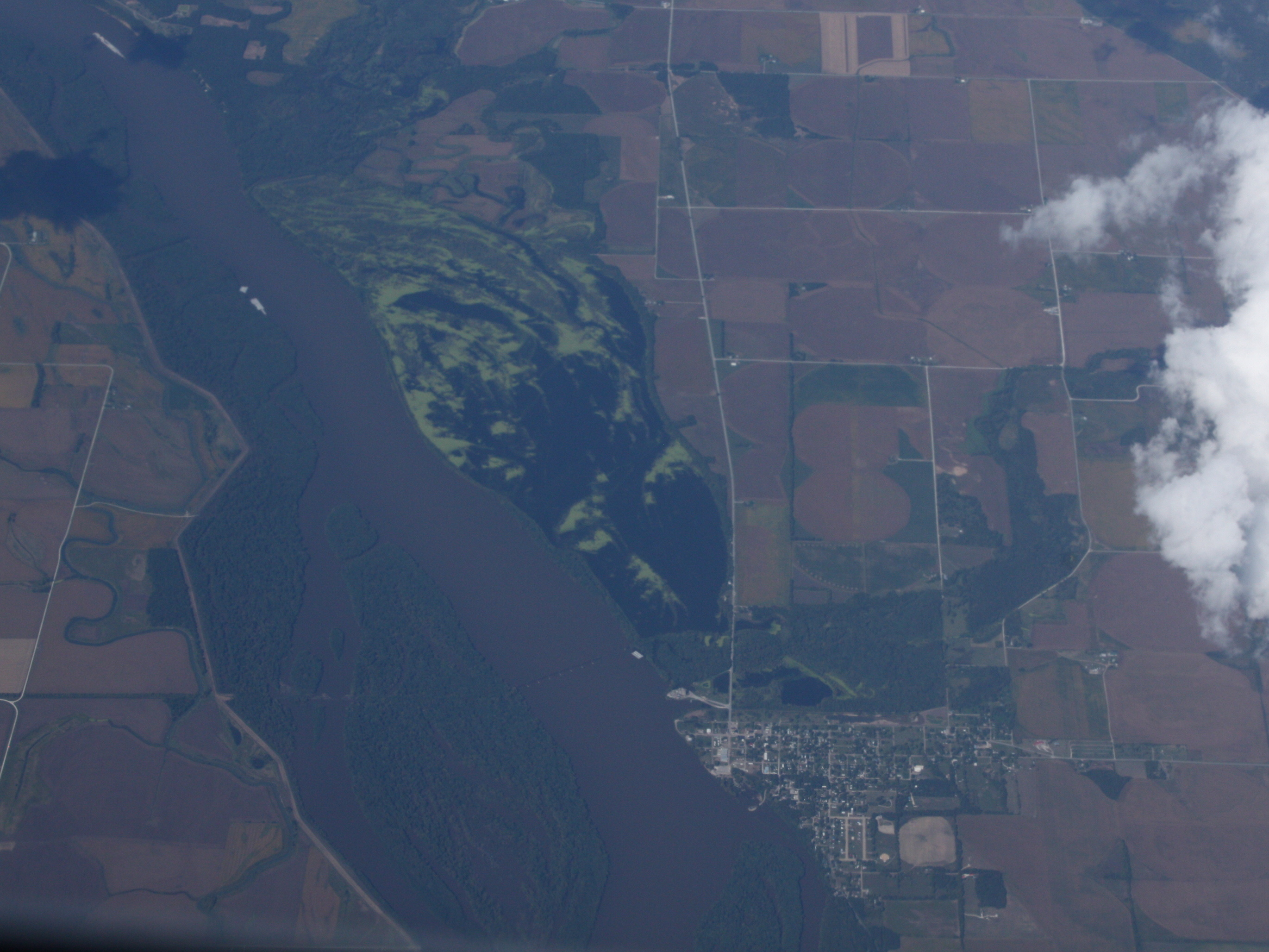
Oblique air photo of Keithsburg (bottom) and the Wildlife Refuge to the north, in September, 2018.

== Demographics ==
Historical population
Census	Pop.	Note	%±
1850	252		—
1860	1,017		303.6%
1870	1,179		15.9%
1880	942		−20.1%
1890	1,484		57.5%
1900	1,566		5.5%
1910	1,515		−3.3%
1920	1,148		−24.2%
1930	1,081		−5.8%
1940	1,130		4.5%
1950	1,006		−11.0%
1960	963		−4.3%
1970	836		−13.2%
1980	936		12.0%
1990	747		−20.2%
2000	714		−4.4%
2010	609		−14.7%
2020	550		−9.7%
U.S. Decennial Census

As of the census of 2000, there were 714 people, 278 households, and 199 families residing in the city. The population density was 276.9 inhabitants per square mile (106.9/km^{2}). There were 306 housing units at an average density of 118.7 per square mile (45.8/km^{2}). The racial makeup of the city was 98.32% White, 0.28% Native American, and 1.40% from two or more races. Hispanic or Latino of any race were 0.42% of the population.

There were 2780 households, out of which 30.2% had children under the age of 18 living with them, 57.2% were married couples living together, 10.1% had a female householder with no husband present, and 28.1% were non-families. 24.5% of all households were made up of individuals, and 16.9% had someone living alone who was 65 years of age or older. The average household size was 2.57 and the average family size was 2.96.

In the city population was spread out, with 26.9% under the age of 18, 7.7% from 18 to 24, 26.6% from 25 to 44, 22.1% from 45 to 64, and 16.7% who were 65 years of age or older. The median age was 36 years. For every 100 females, there were 91.4 males. For every 100 females age 18 and over, there were 88.4 males.

The median income for a household in the city was $32,500, and the median income for a family was $40,781. Males had a median income of $27,000 versus $16,719 for females. The per capita income for the city was $14,008. About 10.3% of families and 14.0% of the population were below the poverty line, including 16.1% of those under age 18 and 4.8% of those age 65 or over.

== Notable person ==
- Parke Wilson, catcher for the New York Giants; born in Keithsburg

== Floods ==
Keithsburg lies next to the Mississippi River. During the Great Flood of 1993, Keithsburg was heavily damaged. The town rebuilt and resumed normal activity. On June 14, 2008, two nearby levees broke, which flooded the town of Keithsburg again.
