= Edwards River (Illinois) =

Physical characteristics
- Source
  - location: Burns Township, Henry County, west of Kewanee, Illinois
  - coordinates: 41°15′15″N 89°58′46″W
- Mouth
  - location: Confluence with the Mississippi River south of New Boston, Illinois
  - coordinates: 41°08′54″N 90°58′54″W
  - elevation: 538 ft (164 m)
- Length: 74 mi (119 km)
- Discharge
  - location: New Boston, Illinois
  - average: 325 cu/ft. per sec.

Basin features
- Progression: Edwards River → Mississippi → Gulf of Mexico
- GNIS ID: 407805

The Edwards River is a 73.7-mile-long (118.6 km) tributary of the Mississippi River in northwestern Illinois in the United States. It rises 3 miles (5 km) west of Kewanee in southeastern Henry County and flows generally westwardly into Mercer County, where it joins the Mississippi 2 miles (3 km) southeast of New Boston. In Henry County it collects the South Edwards River, which flows past Bishop Hill.

The river was once home to a grain mill near Andover, Illinois. Several sections of the Edwards River's course have been straightened and channelized.

== See also ==
- List of Illinois rivers
