= Mercer County, Illinois =

County in Illinois, United States

- County
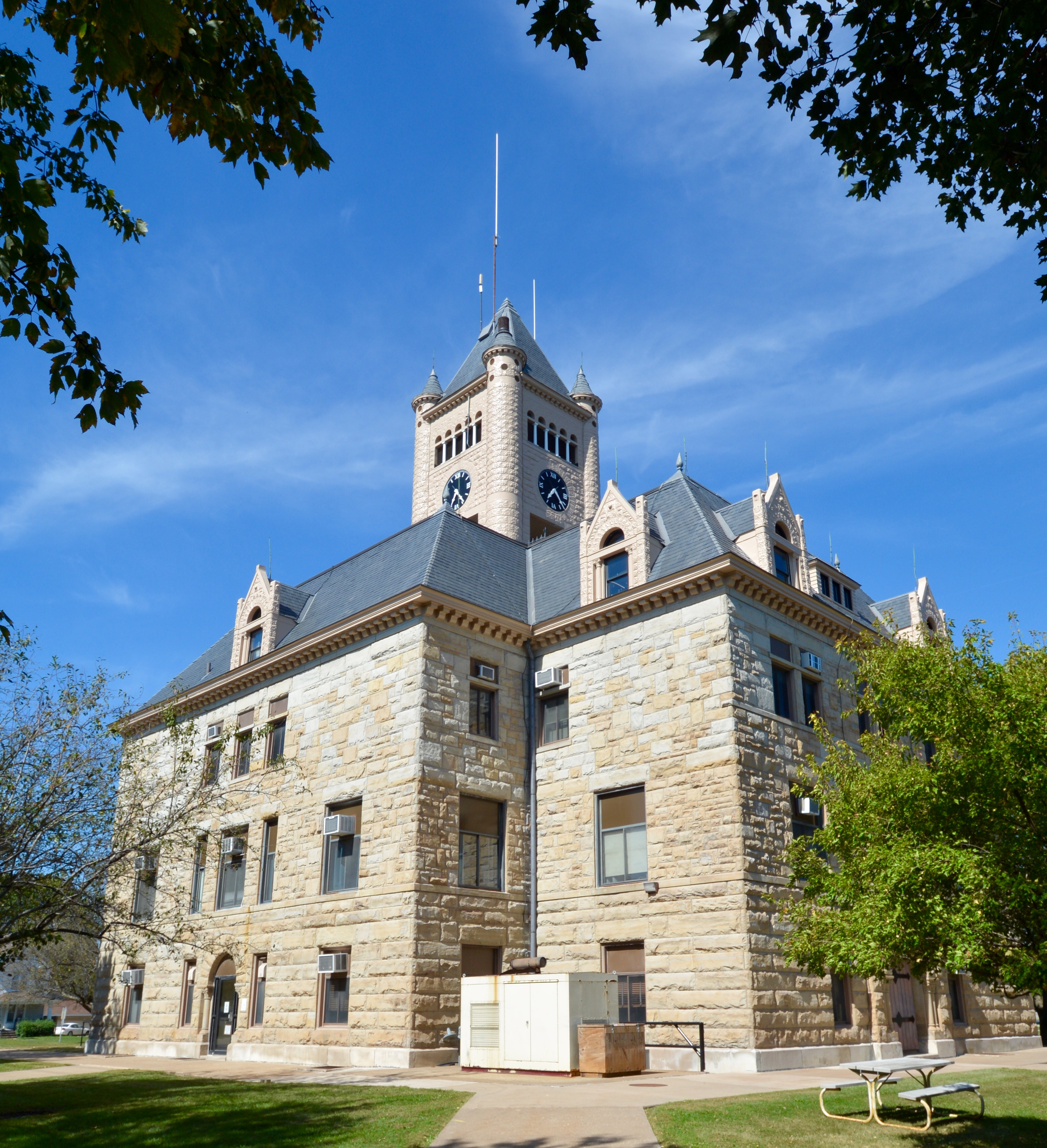
- Mercer County Courthouse

- Location within the U.S. state of Illinois
- Coordinates: 41°12′N 90°44′W
- Country: United States
- State: Illinois
- Founded: January 13, 1825
- Named for: Hugh Mercer
- Seat: Aledo
- Largest city: Aledo

Area
  - Total: 569 sq mi (1,470 km^{2})
  - Land: 561 sq mi (1,450 km^{2})
  - Water: 7.5 sq mi (19 km^{2}) 1.3%

Population (2020)
  - Total: 15,699
  - Estimate (2025): 15,229 ▼
  - Density: 28.0/sq mi (10.8/km^{2})
- Time zone: UTC−6 (Central)
  - Summer (DST): UTC−5 (CDT)
- Congressional districts: 15th, 17th
- Website: www.mercercountyil.org

Mercer County is a county in Illinois. According to the 2020 census, it had a population of 15,699. Its county seat is Aledo. Mercer County is included in the Davenport-Moline-Rock Island, IA-IL Metropolitan Statistical Area.

== History ==
Mercer County is named for Hugh Mercer (1726–1777), a physician and general during the American Revolution who died from wounds suffered at the Battle of Princeton.

In May 1812, Congress passed an act which set aside lands in Arkansas, Michigan, and Illinois as payment to volunteer soldiers in the War of 1812. Mercer County was part of this "Military Tract."

Seven years after Illinois became a state, Mercer County was founded. It was formed from unorganized territory near Pike County on January 13, 1825. Although the county had been created, its government was not organized for several years; for administration purposes it was attached first to Schuyler County (until 1826), then to Peoria (until 1831), and finally to Warren County. The organization of the county government was finally completed in 1835, after a large influx of settlers following the Black Hawk War.

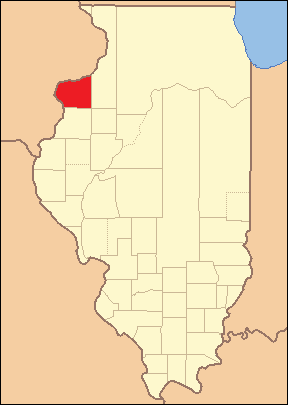
Mercer County at the time of its creation in 1825

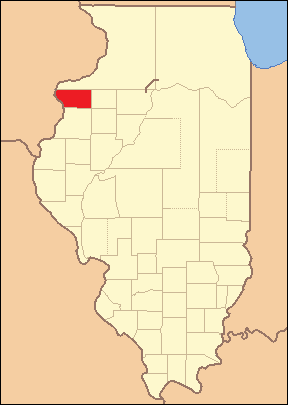
Mercer County in 1827, reduced to its present borders

== Geography ==
According to the U.S. Census Bureau, the county has a total area of 569 square miles (1,470 km^{2}), of which 561 square miles (1,450 km^{2}) is land and 7.5 square miles (19 km^{2}) (1.3%) is water.

=== Climate and weather ===
Aledo, Illinois

Climate chart (precipitation, max. and min. temperature)
J	F	M	A	M	J	J	A	S	O	N	D
1.3 29 11	1.3 35 17	2.4 47 26	3.7 61 37	3.9 72 48	4.4 81 59	4.2 84 62	4.3 82 60	3.3 75 51	2.7 64 40	2.5 47 28	1.9 34 17
- █ Average max. and min. temperatures in °F
- █ Precipitation totals in inches
- Source: The Weather Channel
Metric conversion
J	F	M	A	M	J	J	A	S	O	N	D
32 −2 −12	33 2 −8	62 8 −3	94 16 3	100 22 9	113 27 15	107 29 17	109 28 16	84 24 11	69 18 4	64 8 −2	49 1 −8
- █ Average max. and min. temperatures in °C
- █ Precipitation totals in mm

In recent years, average temperatures in the county seat of Aledo have ranged from a low of 11 °F (−12 °C) in January to a high of 84 °F (29 °C) in July, although a record low of −30 °F (−34 °C) was recorded in February 1905 and a record high of 113 °F (45 °C) was recorded in July 1936. Average monthly precipitation ranged from 1.27 inches (32 mm) in January to 4.43 inches (113 mm) in June.

=== Major highways ===
- U.S. Highway 67
- Illinois Route 17
- Illinois Route 94
- Illinois Route 135

=== Adjacent counties ===
- Rock Island County - north
- Henry County - east
- Knox County - southeast
- Henderson County - south
- Warren County - south
- Des Moines County, Iowa - southwest
- Louisa County, Iowa - west

== Demographics ==
Historical population
Census	Pop.	Note	%±
1830	26		—
1840	2,352		8,946.2%
1850	5,246		123.0%
1860	15,042		186.7%
1870	18,769		24.8%
1880	19,502		3.9%
1890	18,545		−4.9%
1900	20,945		12.9%
1910	19,723		−5.8%
1920	18,800		−4.7%
1930	16,641		−11.5%
1940	17,701		6.4%
1950	17,374		−1.8%
1960	17,149		−1.3%
1970	17,294		0.8%
1980	19,286		11.5%
1990	17,290		−10.3%
2000	16,957		−1.9%
2010	16,434		−3.1%
2020	15,699		−4.5%
2025 (est.)	15,229	▼	−3.0%
U.S. Decennial Census; 1790-1960 1900-1990; 1990-2000 2010

=== 2020 census ===
As of the 2020 census, the county had a population of 15,699. The median age was 45.1 years. 21.7% of residents were under the age of 18 and 22.3% of residents were 65 years of age or older. For every 100 females there were 100.4 males, and for every 100 females age 18 and over there were 99.6 males age 18 and over.

The racial makeup of the county was 94.0% White, 0.5% Black or African American, 0.2% American Indian and Alaska Native, 0.2% Asian, <0.1% Native Hawaiian and Pacific Islander, 0.5% from some other race, and 4.5% from two or more races. Hispanic or Latino residents of any race comprised 3.0% of the population.

<0.1% of residents lived in urban areas, while 100.0% lived in rural areas.

There were 6,578 households in the county, of which 28.0% had children under the age of 18 living in them. Of all households, 54.2% were married-couple households, 18.1% were households with a male householder and no spouse or partner present, and 21.1% were households with a female householder and no spouse or partner present. About 27.7% of all households were made up of individuals and 14.1% had someone living alone who was 65 years of age or older.

There were 7,291 housing units, of which 9.8% were vacant. Among occupied housing units, 80.2% were owner-occupied and 19.8% were renter-occupied. The homeowner vacancy rate was 2.4% and the rental vacancy rate was 9.7%.

=== Racial and ethnic composition ===
Mercer County, Illinois – Racial and ethnic composition Note: the US Census treats Hispanic/Latino as an ethnic category. This table excludes Latinos from the racial categories and assigns them to a separate category. Hispanics/Latinos may be of any race.
Race / Ethnicity (NH = Non-Hispanic)	Pop 1980	Pop 1990	Pop 2000	Pop 2010	Pop 2020	% 1980	% 1990	% 2000	% 2010	% 2020
White alone (NH)	19,096	17,082	16,551	15,912	14,578	99.01%	98.80%	97.61%	96.82%	92.86%
Black or African American alone (NH)	23	30	48	46	68	0.12%	0.17%	0.28%	0.28%	0.43%
Native American or Alaska Native alone (NH)	14	33	18	15	26	0.07%	0.19%	0.11%	0.09%	0.17%
Asian alone (NH)	19	35	29	51	37	0.10%	0.20%	0.17%	0.31%	0.24%
Native Hawaiian or Pacific Islander alone (NH)	x	x	1	1	2	x	x	0.01%	0.01%	0.01%
Other race alone (NH)	19	1	5	6	17	0.10%	0.01%	0.03%	0.04%	0.11%
Mixed race or Multiracial (NH)	x	x	89	96	503	x	x	0.52%	0.58%	3.20%
Hispanic or Latino (any race)	115	109	216	307	468	0.60%	0.63%	1.27%	1.87%	2.98%
Total	19,286	17,290	16,957	16,434	15,699	100.00%	100.00%	100.00%	100.00%	100.00%

=== 2010 census ===
As of the 2010 United States census, there were 16,434 people, 6,734 households, and 4,724 families residing in the county. The population density was 29.3 inhabitants per square mile (11.3/km^{2}). There were 7,358 housing units at an average density of 13.1 per square mile (5.1/km^{2}). The racial makeup of the county was 98.3% white, 0.3% black or African American, 0.3% Asian, 0.1% American Indian, 0.3% from other races, and 0.7% from two or more races. Those of Hispanic or Latino origin made up 1.9% of the population. In terms of ancestry, 25.9% were German, 18.2% were Irish, 11.3% were English, 9.4% were Swedish, and 7.4% were American.

Of the 6,734 households, 30.1% had children under the age of 18 living with them, 58.3% were married couples living together, 7.9% had a female householder with no husband present, 29.8% were non-families, and 25.8% of all households were made up of individuals. The average household size was 2.41 and the average family size was 2.88. The median age was 43.7 years.

The median income for a household in the county was $50,909 and the median income for a family was $62,025. Males had a median income of $46,136 versus $30,392 for females. The per capita income for the county was $25,332. About 8.2% of families and 9.3% of the population were below the poverty line, including 14.9% of those under age 18 and 7.2% of those age 65 or over.

== Communities ==
=== Cities ===
- Aledo
- Keithsburg
- New Boston

=== Villages ===
- Alexis
- Joy
- Matherville
- North Henderson
- Reynolds (Part in Rock Island County)
- Seaton
- Sherrard
- Viola
- Windsor

=== Census-designated place ===
- Cable
- Eliza
- Hamlet
- Millersburg
- Preemption
- Swedona

=== Unincorporated communities ===
- Boden
- Burgess
- Gilchrist
- Mannon
- Marston
- Petersville
- Shale City
- Sunbeam
- Wanlock

=== Townships ===
Mercer County is divided into fifteen townships:

- Abington
- Duncan
- Eliza
- Greene
- Keithsburg
- Mercer
- Millersburg
- New Boston
- North Henderson
- Ohio Grove
- Perryton
- Preemption
- Richland Grove
- Rivoli
- Suez

== Politics ==
Historically, Mercer County was a solidly Republican Yankee-influenced county, and before the Republican Party existed a stronghold of the Whig Party. The county never voted for a Democratic presidential candidate until Lyndon Johnson’s 1964 landslide over Barry Goldwater – the solitary break in Whig and Republican dominance occurring in 1912 when the GOP was mortally split and Progressive Theodore Roosevelt carried the county over conservative incumbent President William Howard Taft. After Johnson’s victory in the county, Mercer voted to being Republican between 1968 and 1984, but Reagan’s landslide in that election saw a swing to the Democrats that was capitalized upon by Michael Dukakis to carry the county in 1988. Between then and 2012, Mercer was solidly Democratic, but concern over declining economic opportunities in the “Rust Belt” caused a dramatic swing to populist Republican Donald Trump in 2016. Trump’s performance was the best by a Republican since Richard Nixon's 3,000-plus-county landslide in 1972.

Mercer County is located in Illinois's 17th Congressional District and is currently represented by Democrat Cheri Bustos. Within the Illinois House of Representatives, the county is located in the 74th district and is currently represented by Republican Daniel Swanson. The county is located in the 37th district of the Illinois Senate, and is currently represented by Republican Chuck Weaver.

United States presidential election results for Mercer County, Illinois
Year	Republican		Democratic		Third party(ies)	
Year	No.	%	No.	%	No.	%
1892	2,470	52.70%	1,975	42.14%	242	5.16%
1896	3,120	56.48%	2,329	42.16%	75	1.36%
1900	3,304	59.39%	2,110	37.93%	149	2.68%
1904	3,230	63.65%	1,386	27.31%	459	9.04%
1908	2,871	57.51%	1,777	35.60%	344	6.89%
1912	959	19.20%	1,602	32.07%	2,435	48.74%
1916	5,308	58.93%	3,430	38.08%	270	3.00%
1920	5,531	74.58%	1,574	21.22%	311	4.19%
1924	5,618	68.30%	1,699	20.66%	908	11.04%
1928	5,699	70.59%	2,316	28.69%	58	0.72%
1932	4,436	50.21%	4,309	48.77%	90	1.02%
1936	5,028	50.87%	4,751	48.07%	105	1.06%
1940	6,336	62.09%	3,830	37.53%	38	0.37%
1944	5,667	63.12%	3,277	36.50%	34	0.38%
1948	5,267	62.55%	3,117	37.02%	36	0.43%
1952	6,416	70.53%	2,679	29.45%	2	0.02%
1956	5,732	65.82%	2,969	34.10%	7	0.08%
1960	5,582	61.60%	3,476	38.36%	3	0.03%
1964	4,220	48.90%	4,410	51.10%	0	0.00%
1968	4,844	56.33%	3,143	36.55%	613	7.13%
1972	5,452	60.98%	3,477	38.89%	11	0.12%
1976	4,816	53.62%	4,090	45.54%	76	0.85%
1980	5,144	56.18%	3,361	36.71%	651	7.11%
1984	4,907	54.97%	3,982	44.61%	38	0.43%
1988	3,683	46.45%	4,204	53.02%	42	0.53%
1992	2,983	34.93%	3,990	46.72%	1,567	18.35%
1996	2,688	34.04%	4,278	54.17%	931	11.79%
2000	3,688	44.34%	4,400	52.90%	230	2.77%
2004	4,405	49.09%	4,512	50.28%	57	0.64%
2008	3,833	43.21%	4,887	55.10%	150	1.69%
2012	3,876	45.24%	4,507	52.60%	185	2.16%
2016	4,807	56.39%	3,071	36.02%	647	7.59%
2020	5,418	60.78%	3,280	36.80%	216	2.42%
2024	5,215	62.28%	2,950	35.23%	208	2.48%

== See also ==
- National Register of Historic Places listings in Mercer County, Illinois
