= Aledo, Illinois =

- City
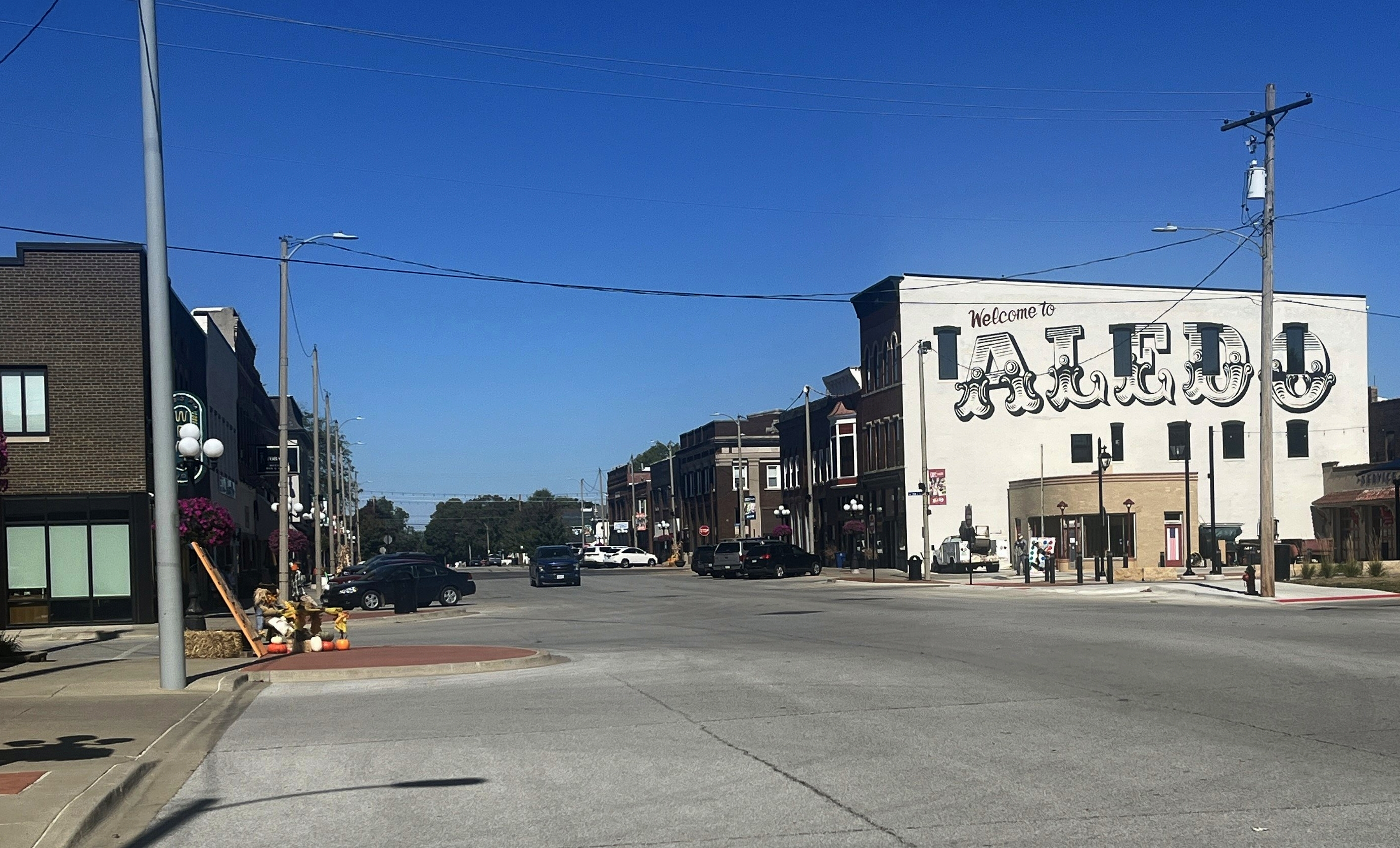
- Downtown Aledo
- Motto: City of Pride and Progress
- Interactive map of Aledo, Illinois
- Location within Illinois Location within the United States
- Coordinates: 41°11′55″N 90°45′02″W
- Country: United States
- State: Illinois
- County: Mercer
- Township: Mercer
- Established: 1855
- Founder: John S. Thompson
- Named for: Aledo, Spain

Government
  - Mayor: Chris Hagloch

Area
  - Total: 2.38 sq mi (6.16 km^{2})
  - Land: 2.37 sq mi (6.13 km^{2})
  - Water: 0.012 sq mi (0.03 km^{2})
- Elevation: 732 ft (223 m)

Population (2020)
  - Total: 3,633
  - Estimate (2024): 3,522
  - Density: 1,534/sq mi (592.3/km^{2})
- Time zone: UTC-6 (CST)
  - Summer (DST): UTC-5 (CDT)
- ZIP code: 61231
- Area code: 309 861
- FIPS code: 17-00646
- GNIS feature ID: 2393914
- Website: www.aledoil.gov

Aledo /əˈliːdoʊ/ is a city in and the county seat of Mercer County, Illinois, United States. The population was 3,633 at the 2020 census.

== History ==
Aledo was established in the 1850s when the Great Western Railroad was extended to that point. It was briefly named "DeSoto", after Hernando de Soto, until the discovery of an identically named village in Jackson County. "Aledo" likely derives from John S. Thompson who, reportedly, saw the name Aledo (a municipality in Spain) in Webster's Dictionary. Development began in the 1850s, and the oldest surviving buildings date from the following decade. A post office has been in operation at Aledo since September 24, 1856. In 1857, the county seat was moved to Aledo from Millersburg after a countywide referendum. Aledo was incorporated on August 15, 1863. In the 1950s, the first Tastee-Freez in the United States was built in the downtown. The Downtown Aledo Historic District was established in 2016, with 75 contributing historic buildings in the downtown area.

== Geography ==
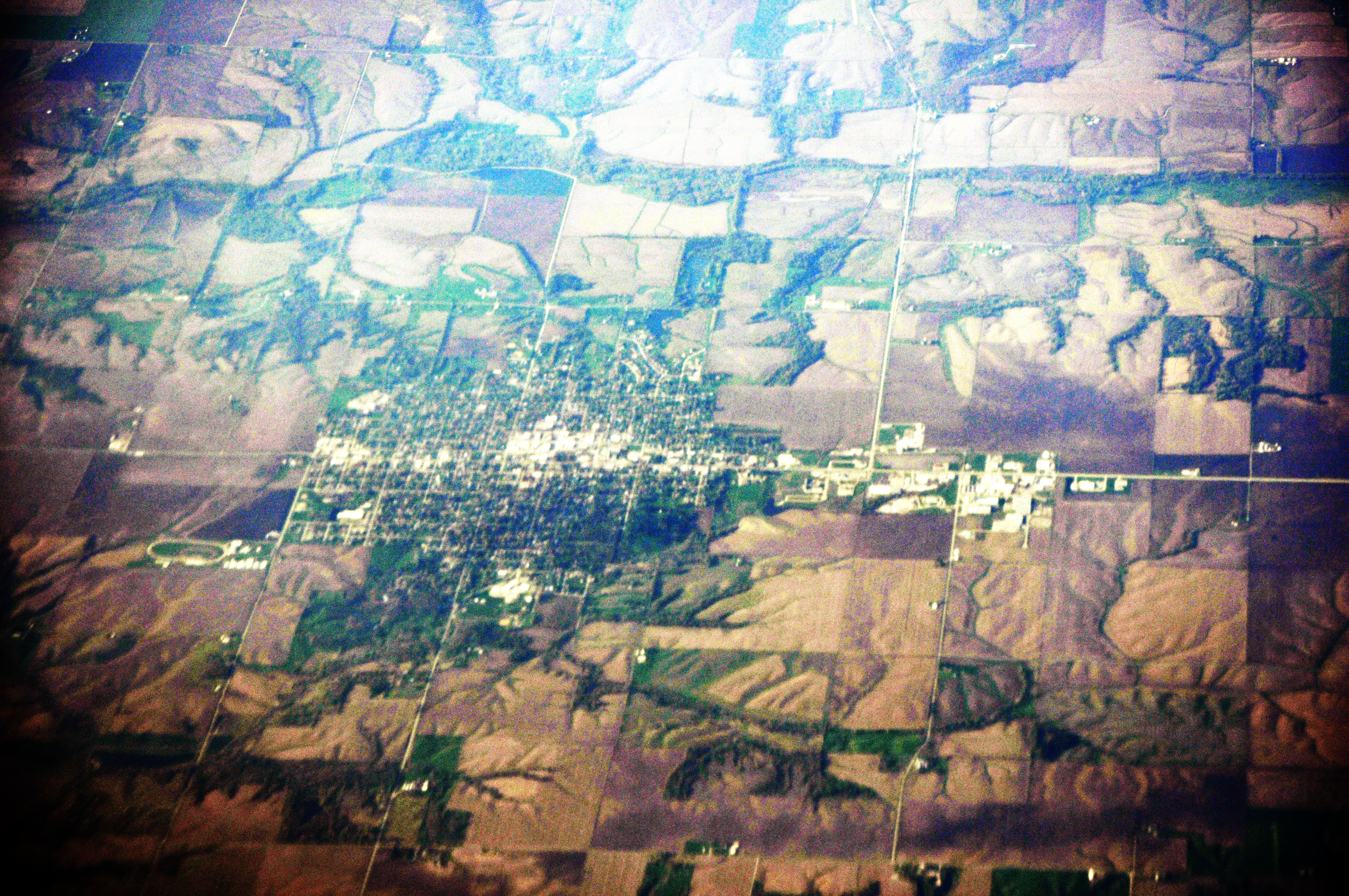
Aerial view of Aledo, 2012

Aledo is located in central Mercer County. Illinois Route 17 passes through the city center on Third Street, leading east 8 miles (13 km) to Viola and west 14 miles (23 km) to New Boston on the Mississippi River. Illinois Route 94 follows IL 17 along Southeast Third Street turns south at the city center onto South College Avenue. IL 94 leads south-southwest 29 miles (47 km) to Biggsville and northeast 22 miles (35 km) to U.S. Route 67 on the southern outskirts of the Quad Cities.

According to the U.S. Census Bureau, Aledo has a total area of 2.36 square miles (6.11 km^{2}), of which 0.012 square miles (0.03 km^{2}), or 0.51%, are water. The city sits on high ground that drains north to the Edwards River, a westward-flowing direct tributary of the Mississippi, and south to Pike Run, a tributary of Pope Creek, which flows to the Mississippi at Keithsburg.

=== Climate ===
Climate data for Aledo, Illinois, 1991–2020 normals, extremes 1900–present
Month	Jan	Feb	Mar	Apr	May	Jun	Jul	Aug	Sep	Oct	Nov	Dec	Year
Record high °F (°C)	69 (21)	72 (22)	94 (34)	93 (34)	103 (39)	104 (40)	113 (45)	106 (41)	102 (39)	93 (34)	81 (27)	73 (23)	113 (45)
Mean maximum °F (°C)	52.2 (11.2)	56.3 (13.5)	71.4 (21.9)	80.5 (26.9)	87.0 (30.6)	91.3 (32.9)	92.9 (33.8)	91.6 (33.1)	89.5 (31.9)	82.9 (28.3)	68.7 (20.4)	55.8 (13.2)	94.6 (34.8)
Mean daily maximum °F (°C)	31.0 (−0.6)	35.6 (2.0)	49.1 (9.5)	62.1 (16.7)	72.7 (22.6)	81.7 (27.6)	84.7 (29.3)	83.1 (28.4)	76.9 (24.9)	64.1 (17.8)	49.3 (9.6)	36.4 (2.4)	60.6 (15.9)
Daily mean °F (°C)	22.2 (−5.4)	26.3 (−3.2)	38.2 (3.4)	50.0 (10.0)	61.2 (16.2)	70.7 (21.5)	74.1 (23.4)	72.3 (22.4)	65.1 (18.4)	52.7 (11.5)	39.4 (4.1)	28.0 (−2.2)	50.0 (10.0)
Mean daily minimum °F (°C)	13.3 (−10.4)	17.0 (−8.3)	27.4 (−2.6)	37.9 (3.3)	49.7 (9.8)	59.8 (15.4)	63.4 (17.4)	61.5 (16.4)	53.2 (11.8)	41.3 (5.2)	29.5 (−1.4)	19.6 (−6.9)	39.5 (4.1)
Mean minimum °F (°C)	−8.3 (−22.4)	−2.6 (−19.2)	8.9 (−12.8)	24.8 (−4.0)	36.6 (2.6)	48.7 (9.3)	54.8 (12.7)	53.1 (11.7)	39.9 (4.4)	26.9 (−2.8)	13.6 (−10.2)	0.0 (−17.8)	−11.9 (−24.4)
Record low °F (°C)	−33 (−36)	−30 (−34)	−15 (−26)	10 (−12)	26 (−3)	36 (2)	44 (7)	38 (3)	24 (−4)	9 (−13)	−6 (−21)	−22 (−30)	−33 (−36)
Average precipitation inches (mm)	1.67 (42)	1.85 (47)	2.52 (64)	4.00 (102)	5.06 (129)	5.37 (136)	3.86 (98)	3.89 (99)	3.73 (95)	2.82 (72)	2.32 (59)	2.01 (51)	39.10 (993)
Average snowfall inches (cm)	6.2 (16)	6.2 (16)	3.0 (7.6)	0.6 (1.5)	0.0 (0.0)	0.0 (0.0)	0.0 (0.0)	0.0 (0.0)	0.0 (0.0)	0.3 (0.76)	1.4 (3.6)	4.1 (10)	21.8 (55.46)
Average precipitation days (≥ 0.01 in)	6.0	6.4	7.9	9.9	11.5	9.8	7.8	7.6	6.7	7.7	6.4	6.3	94.0
Average snowy days (≥ 0.1 in)	2.8	2.4	1.1	0.1	0.0	0.0	0.0	0.0	0.0	0.1	0.7	2.2	9.4
Source: NOAA

== Demographics ==
Historical population
Census	Pop.	Note	%±
1860	563		—
1870	1,076		91.1%
1880	1,492		38.7%
1890	1,601		7.3%
1900	2,081		30.0%
1910	2,144		3.0%
1920	2,231		4.1%
1930	2,203		−1.3%
1940	2,593		17.7%
1950	2,919		12.6%
1960	3,080		5.5%
1970	3,325		8.0%
1980	3,881		16.7%
1990	3,681		−5.2%
2000	3,613		−1.8%
2010	3,640		0.7%
2020	3,633		−0.2%
U.S. Decennial Census

=== 2020 census ===
As of the 2020 census, Aledo had a population of 3,633. The median age was 45.0 years. 21.7% of residents were under the age of 18 and 26.2% of residents were 65 years of age or older. For every 100 females there were 91.6 males, and for every 100 females age 18 and over there were 88.5 males age 18 and over.

0.0% of residents lived in urban areas, while 100.0% lived in rural areas.

There were 1,559 households in Aledo, of which 26.2% had children under the age of 18 living in them. Of all households, 46.4% were married-couple households, 16.9% were households with a male householder and no spouse or partner present, and 30.4% were households with a female householder and no spouse or partner present. About 35.4% of all households were made up of individuals and 19.9% had someone living alone who was 65 years of age or older.

There were 1,749 housing units, of which 10.9% were vacant. The homeowner vacancy rate was 4.3% and the rental vacancy rate was 13.8%.

Racial composition as of the 2020 census
Race	Number	Percent
White	3,437	94.6%
Black or African American	39	1.1%
American Indian and Alaska Native	6	0.2%
Asian	12	0.3%
Native Hawaiian and Other Pacific Islander	0	0.0%
Some other race	13	0.4%
Two or more races	126	3.5%
Hispanic or Latino (of any race)	101	2.8%

=== 2010 census ===
At the 2010 census, there were 3,640 people, 1,568 households and 947 families residing in the city. The racial make-up of the city was 98.5% (3,586) white, 0.6% (22) African American, 0.0% (1) Native American, 0.3% (12) Asian, 0.1% (4) from other races and 0.4% (15) from two or more races. Hispanic or Latino of any race were 1.2% (45) of the population.

There were 1,568 households, of which 24.5% had children under the age of 18 living in them, 49.0% were married couples living together, 3.6% had a male householder with no wife present, 7.8% had a female householder with no husband present and 39.6% were non-families. 35.7% of all households were made up of individuals and 20.2% had someone living alone who was 65 years of age or older. The average household size was 2.20 and the average family size was 2.84.

The male population made up 47.5% (1,728), the female population made up 52.5% (1,912). 6.3% (229) of the population were under 5 years, 17.1% (622) from 5 to 19 years, 10.3% (374) from 20 to 29 years, 10.2% (368) from 30 to 39, 12.5% (453) from 40 to 49, 12.9% (472) from 50 to 59 years, 12.1% (441) from 60 to 69, 8.2% (296) from 70 to 79 and 10.6% (385) were 80 years and over. The median age was 45.8 years.

=== Income and poverty ===
The 2009-2013 American Community Survey estimated the median household income in 2013 to be $39,424 and the median family income to be $56,546. Full-time, year-round male workers were estimated to have a median income of $44,435 and females $30,357. The per capita income was $21,373. About 15.0% of families and 18.4% of the population were estimated to be below the poverty line, including 22.1% of those under age 18 and 11.7% of those age 65 or over.

=== Employment ===
The American Community Survey estimated that in 2013 there were 1,740 civilians 16 years and over employed. Of those, 33.7% were estimated to be employed in educational services, health care or social assistance, 14.3% in manufacturing, 10.0% in construction, 8.4% in retail trade, 6.8% in professional, scientific, management, administrative or waste management services, 6.1% in finance, insurance, real estate, rental and leasing, 4.8% in arts, entertainment, recreation, accommodation or food services and the remaining 15.9% in other trades, including agriculture, forestry, fishing and hunting, mining, wholesale trade, transportation and warehousing, utilities, information, public administration and other services.

== Notable people ==
- Gertrude Abercrombie, surrealist painter
- Suzy Bogguss, country and western singer
- Oscar E. Carlstrom, Illinois attorney general
- Herschel L. Carnahan, 30th lieutenant governor of California
- Dora Doxey, tried for murder in 1910 and found not guilty
- Peaches Graham, Major League Baseball catcher
- Doris Emrick Lee, artist
- Frank Lewis Marsh, educator and creationist
- Dewey McDougal, Major League Baseball pitcher
- Margo Price, country singer-songwriter
- Guy C. Scott, chief justice of the Illinois Supreme Court and mayor of Aledo
- Judson Welliver, presidential speech writer

== Education ==
Aledo was the home to William & Vashti College (1908–1917) — the campus/buildings were purchased and used by the Roosevelt Military Academy from 1924 to 1973. The Administration Building was torn down, and the spot was used to construct an assisted living facility. The remaining two buildings (Niles Hall and North Hall) are unused. William & Vashti College was a member of the Illinois Intercollegiate Athletic Conference from 1910 to 1917.

The High School Mascot used to be the Aledo Green Dragons. School colors were Forest Green and White. The Class of 2006 had 71 students, which is about an average class size.

Mercer County High School offers a variety of course curriculum in the sciences, math, literature, social sciences, and the arts. The school has a concert band, jazz band, marching band, concert choir, and swing choir.

The school also offers a variety of athletics including volleyball, football, both men and women's golf, men and women's basketball, wrestling, track and field, softball, baseball, and cross country. Some extracurricular activities that students can become involved in are scholastic bowl, football, basketball, pom poms, cheerleading, flags, majorettes, and musicals.

From 1915 to 2009, Aledo High School competed in boys football. They qualified for the state tournament on 17 occasions since the tournament began in 1974. From 1998 to 2006, Aledo High School has reached the finals of five IHSA boys' football championship tournaments. Of those five, the school won three times.

Aledo School District #201 and Westmer School District #203 have consolidated since the 2009–2010 school year. The consolidation was voted upon by both school boards and was on the ballot for the 2008 election. The measure passed by a 76% margin.

The new consolidated district is Mercer County District #404 and the new mascot adopted by popular vote in early 2009 is the Mercer County Golden Eagles. School colors changed to navy blue and vegas gold. The Class of 2010 had over 120 students, well above the usual average.

== Culture and media ==
Aledo hosts two annual festivals, the Rhubarb Fest and Antique Days. The Rhubarb Festival, which is held every June in the city downtown, offers a variety of rhubarb-related activities, ranging from rhubarb pie sales to free rhubarb seed distributions. The festival additionally offers other crafts and forms of entertainment and music; it has been undertaken every year since 1991. The city of Aledo's Antique Days festivals likewise occur annually in the month of September, and includes a citywide food festival, music from local residents and the high school music departments, and sports competitions among communities in the area.

Aledo has its own radio station, WRMJ-FM. WRMJ features country music along with live sports, local news and local programming. It broadcasts on a frequency of 102.3 MHz from a tower west of Aledo. The radio station serves most of Mercer County, and was founded in 1979. Mercer County's weekly newspaper, The Times Record, is based in Aledo and is owned by Gannett. National Communications Magazine, a publication for radio hobbyists, moved its operations from Ohio to Aledo in 2014 after being acquired by a local resident.
