= Phenix Township, Henry County, Illinois =

Phenix Township
- Township
- Location in Henry County

- Henry County's location in Illinois
- Coordinates: 41°32′30″N 90°08′55″W
- Country: United States
- State: Illinois
- County: Henry
- Established: November 4, 1856

Area
  - Total: 33.10 sq mi (85.7 km^{2})
  - Land: 32.84 sq mi (85.1 km^{2})
  - Water: 0.26 sq mi (0.67 km^{2}) 0.79%
- Elevation: 646 ft (197 m)

Population (2020)
  - Total: 1,713
  - Density: 52.16/sq mi (20.14/km^{2})
- Time zone: UTC-6 (CST)
  - Summer (DST): UTC-5 (CDT)
- ZIP codes: 61250, 61254
- FIPS code: 17-073-59462

Phenix Township is one of twenty-four townships in Henry County, Illinois, USA. As of the 2020 census, its population was 1,713 and it contained 656 housing units.

== Geography ==
According to the 2021 census gazetteer files, Phenix Township has a total area of 33.10 square miles (85.73 km^{2}), of which 32.84 square miles (85.06 km^{2}) (or 99.21%) is land and 0.26 square miles (0.67 km^{2}) (or 0.79%) is water.

=== Unincorporated towns ===
- Shady Beach at 41.538923°N 90.196788°W

(This list is based on USGS data and may include former settlements.)

=== Adjacent townships ===
- Portland Township, Whiteside County (northeast)
- Loraine Township (east)
- Atkinson Township (southeast)
- Geneseo Township (south)
- Hanna Township (west)
- Zuma Township, Rock Island County (west)
- Canoe Creek Township, Rock Island County (northwest)

=== Cemeteries ===
The township contains these three cemeteries: Ebenezer, McHenry and Pink Prairie.

=== Major highways ===
- Illinois Route 82
- Illinois Route 92

=== Airports and landing strips ===
- Kazuma Airport
- Ropp Airpark

=== Lakes ===
- Shadow Lake

== Demographics ==
As of the 2020 census there were 1,713 people, 594 households, and 469 families residing in the township. The population density was 51.75 inhabitants per square mile (19.98/km^{2}). There were 656 housing units at an average density of 19.82 per square mile (7.65/km^{2}). The racial makeup of the township was 92.70% White, 0.58% African American, 0.06% Native American, 0.70% Asian, 0.12% Pacific Islander, 1.63% from other races, and 4.20% from two or more races. Hispanic or Latino of any race were 3.91% of the population.

There were 594 households, out of which 24.10% had children under the age of 18 living with them, 69.70% were married couples living together, 9.26% had a female householder with no spouse present, and 21.04% were non-families. 19.40% of all households were made up of individuals, and 5.60% had someone living alone who was 65 years of age or older. The average household size was 2.55 and the average family size was 2.80.

The township's age distribution consisted of 18.8% under the age of 18, 6.5% from 18 to 24, 22.8% from 25 to 44, 31.7% from 45 to 64, and 20.2% who were 65 years of age or older. The median age was 45.7 years. For every 100 females, there were 103.9 males. For every 100 females age 18 and over, there were 110.1 males.

The median income for a household in the township was $102,206, and the median income for a family was $106,964. Males had a median income of $79,000 versus $38,906 for females. The per capita income for the township was $45,286. About 1.9% of families and 1.8% of the population were below the poverty line, including 0.0% of those under age 18 and 5.6% of those age 65 or over.

Historical population
Census	Pop.	Note	%±
2000	1,636		—
2010	1,672		2.2%
2020	1,713		2.5%
U.S. Decennial Census

== School districts ==
- Erie Community Unit School District 1
- Geneseo Community Unit School District 228

== Political districts ==
- Illinois's 14th congressional district
- State House District 90
- State Senate District 45

As of 2020 census remaps Phenix Township is the 16th Congressional District

- State House District 73
- State Senate District 37
