= Colona Township, Henry County, Illinois =

Colona Township
- Township
- Location in Henry County

- Henry County's location in Illinois
- Coordinates: 41°27′13″N 90°22′06″W
- Country: United States
- State: Illinois
- County: Henry
- Established: November 4, 1856

Government
  - Supervisor: Joe Swan

Area
  - Total: 29.83 sq mi (77.3 km^{2})
  - Land: 28.92 sq mi (74.9 km^{2})
  - Water: 0.91 sq mi (2.4 km^{2}) 3.05%
- Elevation: 636 ft (194 m)

Population (2020)
  - Total: 6,706
  - Density: 231.9/sq mi (89.53/km^{2})
- Time zone: UTC-6 (CST)
  - Summer (DST): UTC-5 (CDT)
- ZIP codes: 61240, 61241, 61254
- FIPS code: 17-073-15677

Colona Township is one of twenty-four townships in Henry County, Illinois, USA. As of the 2020 census, its population was 6,706 and it contained 2,899 housing units. Colona Township changed its name from Green River Township on April 13, 1857.

== Geography ==
According to the 2021 census gazetteer files, Colona Township has a total area of 29.83 square miles (77.26 km^{2}), of which 28.92 square miles (74.90 km^{2}) (or 96.95%) is land and 0.91 square miles (2.36 km^{2}) (or 3.05%) is water.

=== Cities, towns, villages ===
- Cleveland (partial)
- Coal Valley (partial)
- Colona

=== Unincorporated towns ===
- Briar Bluff at 41.459757°N 90.363461°W
- Dayton at 41.489201°N 90.321515°W
- Green Rock at 41.47309°N 90.357627°W
- Level Acres at 41.468924°N 90.322070°W
- Timber Ridge at 41.451423°N 90.426519°W

(This list is based on USGS data and may include former settlements.)

=== Adjacent townships ===
- Hampton Township, Rock Island County (north)
- Hanna Township (northeast)
- Edford Township (east)
- Osco Township (southeast)
- Western Township (south)
- Rural Township, Rock Island County (southwest)
- Coal Valley Township, Rock Island County (west)
- South Moline Township, Rock Island County (west)

=== Cemeteries ===
The township contains these three cemeteries: Colona, Dayton and Glenwood.

=== Major highways ===
- Interstate 74
- Interstate 80
- Interstate 280
- U.S. Route 6
- U.S. Route 150

== Demographics ==
As of the 2020 census there were 6,706 people, 2,776 households, and 1,907 families residing in the township. The population density was 224.84 inhabitants per square mile (86.81/km^{2}). There were 2,899 housing units at an average density of 97.20 per square mile (37.53/km^{2}). The racial makeup of the township was 89.49% White, 0.89% African American, 0.43% Native American, 0.27% Asian, 0.04% Pacific Islander, 1.80% from other races, and 7.07% from two or more races. Hispanic or Latino of any race were 6.92% of the population.

There were 2,776 households, out of which 32.70% had children under the age of 18 living with them, 58.54% were married couples living together, 8.97% had a female householder with no spouse present, and 31.30% were non-families. 27.10% of all households were made up of individuals, and 10.50% had someone living alone who was 65 years of age or older. The average household size was 2.43 and the average family size was 3.01.

The township's age distribution consisted of 19.7% under the age of 18, 9.8% from 18 to 24, 21.9% from 25 to 44, 33.4% from 45 to 64, and 15.1% who were 65 years of age or older. The median age was 43.7 years. For every 100 females, there were 90.1 males. For every 100 females age 18 and over, there were 80.5 males.

The median income for a household in the township was $69,754, and the median income for a family was $80,514. Males had a median income of $52,563 versus $28,929 for females. The per capita income for the township was $36,830. About 4.1% of families and 6.0% of the population were below the poverty line, including 10.4% of those under age 18 and 1.3% of those age 65 or over.

Historical population
Census	Pop.	Note	%±
2000	6,672		—
2010	6,822		2.2%
2020	6,706		−1.7%
U.S. Decennial Census

== School districts ==
- Geneseo Community Unit School District 228
- Orion Community Unit School District 223

== Political districts ==
- Illinois's 17th congressional district
- State House District 71
- State Senate District 36
