= Quad Cities Nuclear Generating Station =

Nuclear power plant in Illinois

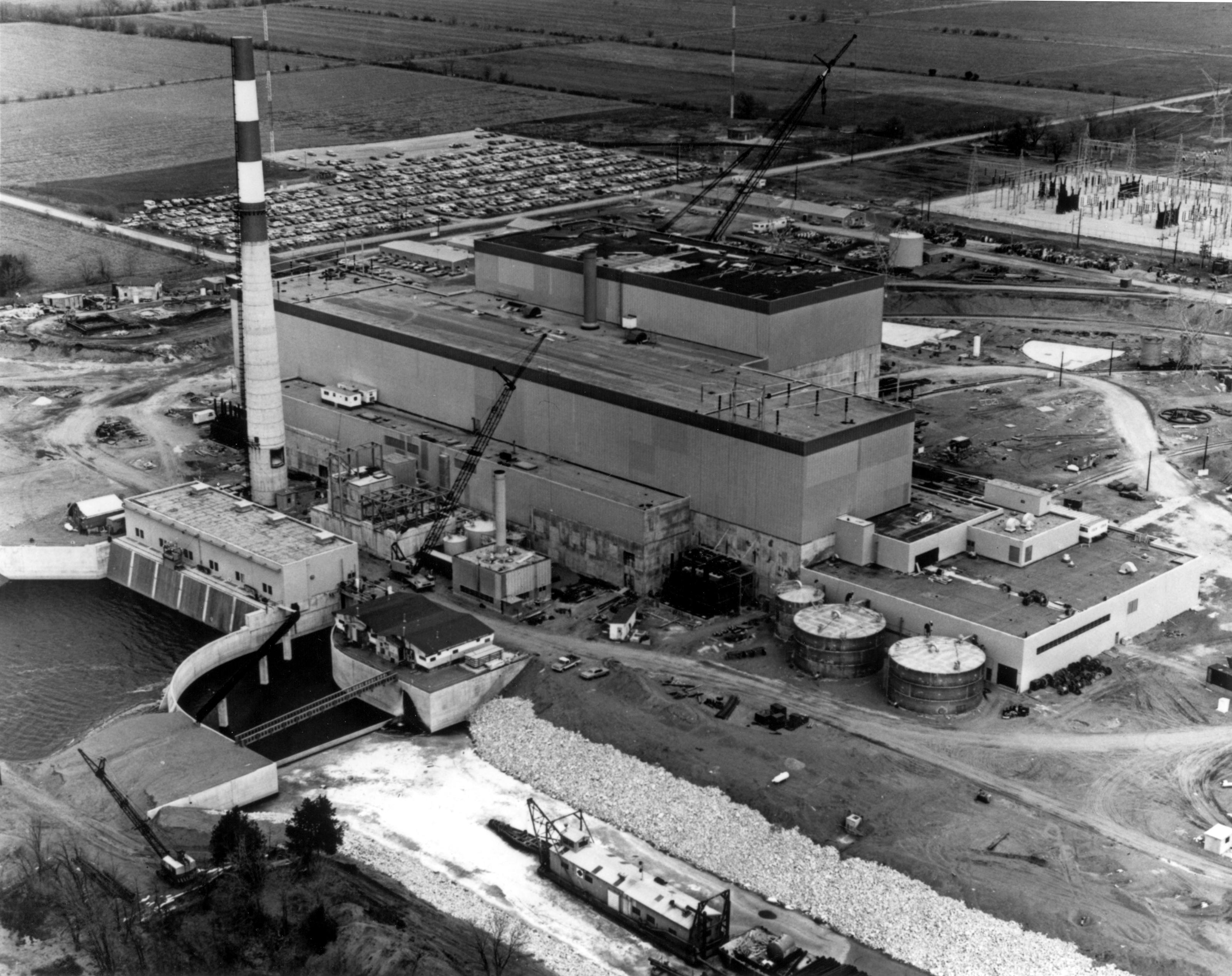
- B&W photo of Quad Cities Generating Station
- Official name: Quad Cities Generating Station
- Country: United States
- Location: Cordova Township, Rock Island County, near Cordova, Illinois
- Coordinates: 41°43′35″N 90°18′36″W
- Status: Operational
- Construction began: February 15, 1967
- Commission date: Unit 1: February 18, 1973; Unit 2: March 10, 1973
- Construction cost: $250 million
- Owners: Constellation Energy (75%); MidAmerican Energy (25%)
- Operator: Constellation Energy

Nuclear power station
- Reactor type: BWR
- Reactor supplier: General Electric
- Cooling source: Mississippi River
- Thermal capacity: 2 × 2957 MW_{th}

Power generation
- Units operational: 1 × 908 MW; 1 × 911 MW
- Make and model: BWR-3 (Mark 1)
- Nameplate capacity: 1819 MW
- Capacity factor: 96.66% (2017); 76.60% (lifetime)
- Annual net output: 15,402 GWh (2017)

External links
- Website: Quad Cities Generating Station
- Commons: Related media on Commons

Quad Cities Generating Station is a two-unit nuclear power plant located near Cordova, Illinois, United States, on the Mississippi River. The two General Electric boiling water reactors give the plant a total gross electric capacity of approximately 1,880 MW. It was named for the nearby cities of Moline, Illinois, Rock Island, Illinois, Davenport, Iowa, East Moline, Illinois, and Bettendorf, Iowa — known as the Quad Cities.

The Quad Cities plant is owned and operated by Constellation Energy. In 2004, the U.S. Nuclear Regulatory Commission (NRC) approved a 20-year license extension for both reactors at this plant. Citing the plant's ongoing string of financial losses, Exelon had considered shutting down the facility by 2018.

On June 2, 2016, Exelon announced its intentions to close Quad Cities Nuclear Generating Station on June 1, 2018 due to the plant's profitability and a lack of support from the Illinois state legislature.

On December 14, 2016, Exelon announced it would keep Quad Cities Nuclear Generating station open due to Illinois passing the Future Energy Jobs Bill.

== Electricity production ==
Generation (MWh) of Quad Cities Nuclear Generation Station
Year	Jan	Feb	Mar	Apr	May	Jun	Jul	Aug	Sep	Oct	Nov	Dec	Annual (Total)
2001	1,172,952	1,056,612	1,106,183	1,065,468	1,162,558	1,117,115	1,135,979	635,766	1,101,113	1,162,846	1,130,032	1,138,068	12,984,692
2002	738,475	596,682	1,007,517	1,086,067	1,167,150	1,142,800	931,703	1,165,500	1,174,630	1,228,133	744,548	1,283,145	12,266,350
2003	1,306,327	1,152,976	1,278,664	1,171,498	954,716	815,842	1,220,760	1,281,536	1,265,121	1,304,252	833,485	1,186,540	13,771,717
2004	1,202,875	991,349	568,791	1,084,379	1,121,888	1,076,092	1,107,130	1,111,430	1,074,236	1,124,678	1,091,794	1,127,459	12,682,101
2005	1,126,644	1,017,777	928,283	738,220	920,192	1,070,820	1,200,205	1,283,322	1,248,711	1,276,356	1,255,174	1,253,172	13,318,876
2006	884,856	976,728	1,001,358	691,552	880,325	1,250,611	1,284,768	1,253,438	1,245,977	1,295,714	1,251,173	1,293,171	13,309,671
2007	1,294,067	1,148,358	1,245,422	1,122,822	832,192	1,247,167	1,289,652	1,289,911	1,155,812	1,288,041	1,252,265	1,291,167	14,456,876
2008	1,289,535	1,155,382	679,767	1,209,381	1,287,186	1,247,811	1,290,501	1,284,779	1,243,128	1,284,862	1,207,123	1,045,245	14,224,700
2009	1,293,347	1,164,741	1,283,011	1,121,735	665,054	1,255,708	1,316,606	1,314,494	1,192,831	1,332,665	1,290,149	1,333,254	14,563,595
2010	1,332,886	1,201,545	946,115	878,629	1,342,923	1,287,987	1,319,544	1,177,008	1,297,582	1,334,883	1,318,226	1,358,923	14,796,251
2011	1,341,665	1,218,765	1,355,647	1,297,776	850,488	996,114	1,346,991	1,352,591	1,328,201	1,385,987	1,354,742	1,372,558	15,201,525
2012	1,398,790	1,304,757	1,077,286	881,276	1,374,746	1,321,561	1,340,635	1,356,197	1,320,064	1,388,445	1,349,695	1,392,520	15,505,972
2013	1,346,965	1,256,393	911,284	1,159,144	1,386,500	1,329,244	1,359,102	1,361,951	1,304,993	1,384,016	1,354,455	1,400,172	15,554,219
2014	1,398,654	1,255,542	1,315,256	669,865	1,227,839	1,325,373	1,367,918	1,361,092	1,328,296	1,391,459	1,346,417	1,398,793	15,386,504
2015	1,379,144	1,259,371	884,267	1,259,505	1,375,851	1,319,940	1,356,402	1,357,153	1,260,263	1,378,572	1,338,887	1,392,796	15,562,151
2016	1,392,976	1,277,269	1,074,899	1,138,776	1,360,632	1,292,922	1,345,446	1,348,784	1,318,130	1,373,284	1,343,799	1,388,178	15,655,095
2017	1,381,740	1,189,096	1,158,137	1,014,707	1,383,006	1,312,859	1,355,570	1,181,544	1,306,134	1,376,811	1,347,184	1,395,079	15,401,867
2018	1,350,562	1,193,362	1,020,999	1,161,787	1,361,155	1,305,914	1,347,581	1,352,914	1,259,129	1,383,445	1,346,246	1,393,364	15,476,458
2019	1,394,950	1,245,033	1,025,065	1,167,264	1,382,694	1,320,762	1,343,700	1,206,344	1,299,316	1,365,988	1,344,689	1,390,303	15,486,108
2020	1,389,488	1,299,343	1,281,531	969,620	1,367,485	1,299,992	1,334,566	1,341,963	1,323,333	1,377,279	1,340,266	1,387,579	15,712,445
2021	1,386,813	1,228,379	966,459	1,335,926	1,381,255	1,315,657	1,347,530	1,354,398	1,327,611	1,364,951	1,333,357	1,397,992	15,740,328
2022	1,388,729	1,216,087	1,068,239	773,234	1,371,461	1,309,731	1,290,058	1,352,038	1,307,049	1,373,110	1,280,261	1,392,250	15,122,247
2023	1,376,789	1,186,584	1,146,014	946,939	1,190,830	1,312,492	1,345,651	1,269,204	1,316,373	1,375,231	1,344,725	1,354,142	15,164,974
2024	1,390,587	1,295,576	1,036,521	1,097,932	1,303,706	1,322,932	1,355,715	1,356,701	1,282,567	1,380,037	1,346,478	1,391,621	15,560,373
2025	1,344,794	1,157,997	837,341	1,302,767	1,121,138	1,308,661	1,341,707	1,347,556	1,304,363	1,374,029	1,342,476	1,390,774	15,173,603
2026	1,386,407	1,238,598	1,259,986	769,815	1,182,819	1,314,460	1,340,458	1,353,505					--

== Extended power uprate ==
During an extended power uprate test on March 5, 2002 (designed to extend the power efficiency of existing BWR reactors), Quad Cities Unit 2 began to experience vibrations in a steam line. On March 29 the plant was manually shut down due to high vibrations causing leaks in the main turbine control system. Unit 2 was restarted on April 2, but vibration broke a main steam pipe drain line. The line was repaired and the restart resumed, but by June 7 the main steam lines were showing unexplained aberrations. The plant was again taken offline for repairs on July 11, and the problem was traced to a hole in the steam dryer. The steam dryer was repaired and Unit 2 was restarted on July 21, 2002. The incident did not result in any increased probability of an accident. The NRC inspected all repairs and the extended power uprate was completed successfully.

	Unit 1	Unit 2
Type	BWR-3	
Nuclear system supplied by	General Electric Company (U.S.)	
Capacity (net MW(e))	934	937
Generation in 2003 (MWh)	5,709,520	6,956,073
Capacity factor	90.6%	92.7%
On-line date	Dec. 14, 1972	
License expiration date	Dec. 14, 2032	

2015 net generation was 15.5 million MWh, and the capacity factor was 95.0%. This equates to roughly 1.2 million homes.

== Surrounding population ==
The Nuclear Regulatory Commission defines two emergency planning zones around nuclear power plants: a plume exposure pathway zone with a radius of 10 miles (16 km), concerned primarily with exposure to, and inhalation of, airborne radioactive contamination, and an ingestion pathway zone of about 50 miles (80 km), concerned primarily with ingestion of food and liquid contaminated by radioactivity.

The 2010 U.S. population within 10 miles (16 km) of Quad Cities was 34,350, a decrease of 0.5 percent in a decade, according to an analysis of U.S. Census data for msnbc.com. The 2010 U.S. population within 50 miles (80 km) was 655,207, a decrease of 0.3 percent since 2000. Cities within 50 miles include Davenport and Moline (19 miles to city center).

== Exelon's cost disclosure ==
In 2015, Exelon's executive vice president stated that its five Illinois dual-unit power plants have costs roughly $33/MW·h to $34/MW·h of electricity produced and that its Clinton single-unit power plant costs roughly $38/MW·h to $39/MW·h. These costs consist of labor, scheduled and outages maintenance (including provisions for unanticipated outages), nuclear fuel, capital spending, corporate costs (like legal and human resources), and the property taxes paid to host communities.

On the other side, revenues come from the energy prices paid by utility customers and businesses and capacity charges covered by all consumers. For 2016 and 2017 energy prices were set in 2015 around $30.50/MW·h (about $33/MW·h in 2014). The August 21, 2015, announced capacity price, set via an auction conducted yearly by PJM Interconnection (the power-grid administrator covering northern Illinois), for the year beginning June 1, 2018, was $215 per megawatt-day, which, divided for 24 hours, translates to $8.96/MW·h. Adding those revenues yields slightly less than $39.50/MW·h, beginning in mid-2018.

In that auction, Quad Cities did not qualify for the capacity charges, having bid too high, so it will get only the energy price, $30.50/MW·h.

More, each power plant has to pay congestion costs, to move its energy on the power grid. Some plants have around $1/MW·h to $2,50/MW·h of such costs. Quad Cities is projected to pay $9.60/MW·h in 2015. Putting all together, Exelon expected to get revenue around $22.50/MW·h in 2017, so Quad Cities would lose $11/MW·h. Given an annual generation of 15.44 million MW·h, it sums to $170 million of losses.

But Quad Cities could be relieved of some of the congestion costs in 2017. Grand Prairie Gateway, a new transmission line, is under construction by Commonwealth Edison, the largest Illinois electric utility. Once completed, it will relieve power-grid congestion for both Quad Cities and Byron, another Exelon power plant. Taking away congestion costs, Quad Cities losses may be reduced to around $70 million in 2017.

In 2016, Exelon distributed charts showing its nuclear plants earning revenue of $19,40/MW·h from Quad Cities to $27,80/MW·h from Dresden. Other values shown were: Braidwood $26.1, Byron $22.2, La Salle $26.5 and Clinton $22.6.

In 2016, Exelon also got a $5.60/MW·h additional revenue following agreements for high-demand periods delivery and in investor presentations, Exelon stated that about 90% of 2016 revenues are locked at more than $34/MW·h. Summing all together, it appears that almost all Exelon power plants, except Clinton, would break-even at $35/MW·h.

In December 2016, Illinois voted to subsidize Exelon with 1c/kWh or $235 million per year (depending on electricity rates) to keep QC and Clinton open for at least 10 years, as natural gas had decreased rates.

== Seismic risk ==
The Nuclear Regulatory Commission's estimate of the risk each year of an earthquake intense enough to cause core damage to the reactor at Quad Cities was 1 in 37,037, according to an NRC study published in August 2010.

== Incidents ==
On March 28, 2023 a drain down event occurred to the number 1 reactor pressure vessel. This was due to the failure to close 177 drain valves. Over a period of 6 minutes at least 1,200 gallons of reactor coolant water was lost. During the event at least two personnel were sprayed in the face with reactor coolant water. During the event procedures were not followed to decontaminate the personnel that were exposed to the radioactive coolant water.

After the event a licensed senior reactor operator submitted inaccurate and incomplete information about the incident falsely claiming it was due to broken hose.
