= Hanna Township, Henry County, Illinois =

Hanna Township
- Township
- Location in Henry County

- Henry County's location in Illinois
- Coordinates: 41°30′02″N 90°14′41″W
- Country: United States
- State: Illinois
- County: Henry
- Established: November 4, 1856

Area
  - Total: 19.91 sq mi (51.6 km^{2})
  - Land: 19.17 sq mi (49.7 km^{2})
  - Water: 0.74 sq mi (1.9 km^{2}) 3.73%
- Elevation: 682 ft (208 m)

Population (2020)
  - Total: 2,308
  - Density: 120.4/sq mi (46.49/km^{2})
- Time zone: UTC-6 (CST)
  - Summer (DST): UTC-5 (CDT)
- ZIP codes: 61241, 61254
- FIPS code: 17-073-32642

Hanna Township is one of twenty-four townships in Henry County, Illinois, USA. As of the 2020 census, its population was 2,308 and it contained 934 housing units.

== History ==
Hanna Township was named for Rev. Philip Hanna, a pioneer settler.

== Geography ==
According to the 2021 census gazetteer files, Hanna Township has a total area of 19.91 square miles (51.57 km^{2}), of which 19.17 square miles (49.65 km^{2}) (or 96.27%) is land and 0.74 square miles (1.92 km^{2}) (or 3.73%) is water.

=== Cities, towns, villages ===
- Cleveland (partial)

=== Unincorporated towns ===
- Hickory Hills at 41.489479°N 90.251512°W
- Woodcrest at 41.489479°N 90.253734°W

(This list is based on USGS data and may include former settlements.)

=== Adjacent townships ===
- Zuma Township, Rock Island County (north)
- Canoe Creek Township, Rock Island County (northeast)
- Geneseo Township (east)
- Phenix Township (east)
- Edford Township (south)
- Colona Township (southwest)
- Hampton Township, Rock Island County (west)

=== Cemeteries ===
The township contains these two cemeteries: Colbert and Hanna.

=== Landmarks ===
- Hennepin Canal Parkway State Park (west edge)

== Demographics ==
As of the 2020 census there were 2,308 people, 902 households, and 760 families residing in the township. The population density was 115.92 inhabitants per square mile (44.76/km^{2}). There were 934 housing units at an average density of 46.91 per square mile (18.11/km^{2}). The racial makeup of the township was 95.19% White, 0.13% African American, 0.13% Native American, 0.17% Asian, 0.00% Pacific Islander, 0.52% from other races, and 3.86% from two or more races. Hispanic or Latino of any race were 3.99% of the population.

There were 902 households, out of which 32.80% had children under the age of 18 living with them, 68.85% were married couples living together, 10.20% had a female householder with no spouse present, and 15.74% were non-families. 15.40% of all households were made up of individuals, and 4.90% had someone living alone who was 65 years of age or older. The average household size was 2.69 and the average family size was 2.94.

The township's age distribution consisted of 20.2% under the age of 18, 10.2% from 18 to 24, 21.9% from 25 to 44, 30.1% from 45 to 64, and 17.5% who were 65 years of age or older. The median age was 44.5 years. For every 100 females, there were 127.8 males. For every 100 females age 18 and over, there were 115.0 males.

The median income for a household in the township was $107,692, and the median income for a family was $119,000. Males had a median income of $65,833 versus $46,683 for females. The per capita income for the township was $50,721. About 2.6% of families and 3.2% of the population were below the poverty line, including 0.8% of those under age 18 and 6.9% of those age 65 or over.

Historical population
Census	Pop.	Note	%±
2000	2,395		—
2010	2,344		−2.1%
2020	2,308		−1.5%
U.S. Decennial Census

== School districts ==
- Geneseo Community Unit School District 228

== Political districts ==
- Illinois's 14th congressional district
- State House District 71
- State Senate District 36
