= Atkinson Township, Henry County, Illinois =

Atkinson Township
- Township
- Location in Henry County

- Henry County's location in Illinois
- Coordinates: 41°27′10″N 90°01′30″W
- Country: United States
- State: Illinois
- County: Henry
- Established: November 4, 1856

Area
  - Total: 35.23 sq mi (91.2 km^{2})
  - Land: 35.15 sq mi (91.0 km^{2})
  - Water: 0.08 sq mi (0.21 km^{2}) 0.22%
- Elevation: 607 ft (185 m)

Population (2020)
  - Total: 1,246
  - Density: 35.45/sq mi (13.69/km^{2})
- Time zone: UTC-6 (CST)
  - Summer (DST): UTC-5 (CDT)
- ZIP codes: 61235, 61254, 61277
- FIPS code: 17-073-02739

Atkinson Township is one of twenty-four townships in Henry County, Illinois, USA. As of the 2020 census, its population was 1,246 and it contained 594 housing units.

== Geography ==
According to the 2021 census gazetteer files, Atkinson Township has a total area of 35.23 square miles (91.25 km^{2}), of which 35.15 square miles (91.04 km^{2}) (or 99.78%) is land and 0.08 square miles (0.21 km^{2}) (or 0.22%) is water.

=== Cities, towns, villages ===
- Atkinson (partial)

=== Adjacent townships ===
- Loraine Township (north)
- Yorktown Township (northeast)
- Alba Township (east)
- Annawan Township (southeast)
- Cornwall Township (south)
- Munson Township (southwest)
- Geneseo Township (west)
- Phenix Township (northwest)

=== Cemeteries ===
The township contains Spring Creek Cemetery.

=== Major highways ===
- Interstate 80
- U.S. Route 6

=== Landmarks ===
- Hennepin Canal Parkway State Park (west half)

== Demographics ==
As of the 2020 census there were 1,246 people, 626 households, and 392 families residing in the township. The population density was 35.37 inhabitants per square mile (13.66/km^{2}). There were 594 housing units at an average density of 16.86 per square mile (6.51/km^{2}). The racial makeup of the township was 95.51% White, 0.24% African American, 0.00% Native American, 0.40% Asian, 0.00% Pacific Islander, 1.04% from other races, and 2.81% from two or more races. Hispanic or Latino of any race were 2.73% of the population.

There were 626 households, out of which 30.40% had children under the age of 18 living with them, 41.85% were married couples living together, 10.70% had a female householder with no spouse present, and 37.38% were non-families. 28.40% of all households were made up of individuals, and 20.00% had someone living alone who was 65 years of age or older. The average household size was 2.38 and the average family size was 2.97.

The township's age distribution consisted of 24.3% under the age of 18, 8.2% from 18 to 24, 22.7% from 25 to 44, 23.4% from 45 to 64, and 21.4% who were 65 years of age or older. The median age was 41.3 years. For every 100 females, there were 77.1 males. For every 100 females age 18 and over, there were 84.9 males.

The median income for a household in the township was $51,053, and the median income for a family was $60,326. Males had a median income of $50,195 versus $31,915 for females. The per capita income for the township was $28,449. About 5.9% of families and 6.3% of the population were below the poverty line, including 2.8% of those under age 18 and 12.6% of those age 65 or over.

Historical population
Census	Pop.	Note	%±
2000	1,403		—
2010	1,274		−9.2%
2020	1,246		−2.2%
U.S. Decennial Census

== School districts ==
- Geneseo Community Unit School District 228

== Political districts ==
- Illinois's 14th congressional district
- State House District 90
- State Senate District 45
