= Buffalo Prairie =

Buffalo Prairie may refer to:

- Buffalo Prairie Township, Rock Island County, Illinois
- Buffalo Prairie, Illinois
