= Rural Township, Illinois =

Rural Township, Illinois may refer to the following townships:

- Rural Township, Rock Island County, Illinois
- Rural Township, Shelby County, Illinois

See also

- Rural Township (disambiguation)
