= Loraine Township, Henry County, Illinois =

Loraine Township
- Township
- Location in Henry County

- Henry County's location in Illinois
- Coordinates: 41°32′26″N 90°02′09″W
- Country: United States
- State: Illinois
- County: Henry
- Established: November 4, 1856

Area
  - Total: 34.74 sq mi (90.0 km^{2})
  - Land: 34.74 sq mi (90.0 km^{2})
  - Water: 0 sq mi (0 km^{2}) 0%
- Elevation: 604 ft (184 m)

Population (2020)
  - Total: 244
  - Density: 7.02/sq mi (2.71/km^{2})
- Time zone: UTC-6 (CST)
  - Summer (DST): UTC-5 (CDT)
- ZIP codes: 61250, 61254, 61277
- FIPS code: 17-073-44732

Loraine Township is one of twenty-four townships in Henry County, Illinois, USA. As of the 2020 census, its population was 244 and it contained 125 housing units.

== Geography ==
According to the 2021 census gazetteer files, Loraine Township has a total area of 34.74 square miles (89.98 km^{2}), all land.

=== Adjacent townships ===
- Portland Township, Whiteside County (north)
- Prophetstown Township, Whiteside County (northeast)
- Yorktown Township (east)
- Alba Township (southeast)
- Atkinson Township (south)
- Geneseo Township (southwest)
- Phenix Township (west)

=== Cemeteries ===
The township contains these three cemeteries: Bowman, Kemmis and Loraine.

=== Major highways ===
- Illinois Route 92

=== Airports and landing strips ===
- Christmas Forest Airport

== Demographics ==
As of the 2020 census there were 244 people, 101 households, and 80 families residing in the township. The population density was 7.02 inhabitants per square mile (2.71/km^{2}). There were 125 housing units at an average density of 3.60 per square mile (1.39/km^{2}). The racial makeup of the township was 95.90% White, 0.82% African American, 0.00% Native American, 0.41% Asian, 0.00% Pacific Islander, 1.64% from other races, and 1.23% from two or more races. Hispanic or Latino of any race were 2.05% of the population.

There were 101 households, out of which 45.50% had children under the age of 18 living with them, 79.21% were married couples living together, none had a female householder with no spouse present, and 20.79% were non-families. 20.80% of all households were made up of individuals, and 6.90% had someone living alone who was 65 years of age or older. The average household size was 2.78 and the average family size was 3.25.

The township's age distribution consisted of 35.2% under the age of 18, 0.0% from 18 to 24, 29.2% from 25 to 44, 24.5% from 45 to 64, and 11.0% who were 65 years of age or older. The median age was 35.5 years. For every 100 females, there were 75.6 males. For every 100 females age 18 and over, there were 106.8 males.

The median income for a household in the township was $109,583, and the median income for a family was $115,000. Males had a median income of $81,250 versus $43,558 for females. The per capita income for the township was $35,138. No families and 2.5% of the population were below the poverty line, including none of those under age 18 and none of those age 65 or over.

Historical population
Census	Pop.	Note	%±
2000	328		—
2010	290		−11.6%
2020	244		−15.9%
U.S. Decennial Census

== School districts ==
- Annawan Community Unit School District 226
- Geneseo Community Unit School District 228
- Prophetstown-Lyndon-Tampico Community Unit School District 3

== Political districts ==
- Illinois's 16th congressional district
- State House District 90
- State Senate District 45
