= Andalusia, Illinois =

Andalusia
- Village
- Location of Andalusia in Rock Island County, Illinois.

- Location of Illinois in the United States
- Coordinates: 41°26′15″N 90°42′59″W
- Country: United States
- State: Illinois
- County: Rock Island

Area
  - Total: 1.17 sq mi (3.04 km^{2})
  - Land: 1.17 sq mi (3.04 km^{2})
  - Water: 0 sq mi (0.00 km^{2})
- Elevation: 600 ft (180 m)

Population (2020)
  - Total: 1,184
  - Density: 1,008.0/sq mi (389.19/km^{2})
- Time zone: UTC-6 (CST)
  - Summer (DST): UTC-5 (CDT)
- ZIP Code(s): 61232
- Area code: 309
- FIPS code: 17-01426
- GNIS feature ID: 2397960
- Website: villageofandalusiail.org

Andalusia is a village in Rock Island County, Illinois, United States. The population was 1,184 at the 2020 census, up from 1,178 at the 2010 census.

== History ==
Prior to the arrival of European settlers the area now known as Andalusia along the Mississippi River was inhabited by the Sauk and Meskwaki peoples. Following the end of the Black Hawk War in 1832, American settlers became the dominant force in the area. Captain Benjamin W. Clark (1791-1839) of Virginia was the first person to build a log house in western portion of Rock Island County in 1833. The settlement was originally named Clark's Ferry but with the rise of Buffalo, Iowa across the river it was decided that needed to change. Captain Clark would later move to Buffalo after selling his property in 1836. The settlement was briefly renamed to Rockport and finally Andalusia in 1845. Andalusia Township would break away from Edgington Township in 1858. The town had a post office by 1877.

Andalusia was incorporated as a village in 1894.

== Geography ==
Andalusia is located along the Mississippi River.

According to the 2010 census, Andalusia has a total area of 1.181 square miles (3.06 km^{2}), of which 1.18 square miles (3.06 km^{2}) (or 99.92%) is land and 0.001 square miles (0.00 km^{2}) (or 0.08%) is water.

== Demographics ==
Historical population
Census	Pop.	Note	%±
1890	281		—
1900	326		16.0%
1910	299		−8.3%
1920	228		−23.7%
1930	252		10.5%
1940	365		44.8%
1950	510		39.7%
1960	560		9.8%
1970	950		69.6%
1980	1,238		30.3%
1990	1,052		−15.0%
2000	1,050		−0.2%
2010	1,178		12.2%
2020	1,184		0.5%
U.S. Decennial Census

=== Racial and ethnic composition ===
Andalusia village, Illinois – Racial and ethnic composition Note: the US Census treats Hispanic/Latino as an ethnic category. This table excludes Latinos from the racial categories and assigns them to a separate category. Hispanics/Latinos may be of any race.
Race / Ethnicity (NH = Non-Hispanic)	Pop 2000	Pop 2010	Pop 2020	% 2000	% 2010	% 2020
White alone (NH)	1,013	1,138	1,099	96.48%	96.60%	92.82%
Black or African American alone (NH)	6	8	11	0.57%	0.68%	0.93%
Native American or Alaska Native alone (NH)	1	0	5	0.10%	0.00%	0.42%
Asian alone (NH)	0	4	1	0.00%	0.34%	0.08%
Native Hawaiian or Pacific Islander alone (NH)	0	0	0	0.00%	0.00%	0.00%
Other race alone (NH)	0	0	2	0.00%	0.00%	0.17%
Mixed race or Multiracial (NH)	7	5	30	0.67%	0.42%	2.53%
Hispanic or Latino (any race)	23	23	36	2.19%	1.95%	3.04%
Total	1,050	1,178	1,184	100.00%	100.00%	100.00%

=== 2020 census ===
As of the 2020 census, Andalusia had a population of 1,184. The median age was 42.0 years. 23.1% of residents were under the age of 18 and 17.7% of residents were 65 years of age or older. For every 100 females there were 103.8 males, and for every 100 females age 18 and over there were 99.8 males age 18 and over.

0.0% of residents lived in urban areas, while 100.0% lived in rural areas.

There were 481 households in Andalusia, of which 31.8% had children under the age of 18 living in them. Of all households, 59.5% were married-couple households, 13.5% were households with a male householder and no spouse or partner present, and 21.2% were households with a female householder and no spouse or partner present. About 21.6% of all households were made up of individuals and 8.7% had someone living alone who was 65 years of age or older.

There were 490 housing units, of which 1.8% were vacant. The homeowner vacancy rate was 0.0% and the rental vacancy rate was 0.0%.

=== 2000 census ===
At the 2000 census there were 1,050 people, 402 households, and 307 families living in the village. The population density was 1,463.4 inhabitants per square mile (565.0/km^{2}). There were 415 housing units at an average density of 578.4 per square mile (223.3/km^{2}). The racial makeup of the village was 97.05% White, 0.57% African American, 0.10% Native American, 0.76% from other races, and 1.52% from two or more races. Hispanic or Latino of any race were 2.19%.

Of the 402 households 34.1% had children under the age of 18 living with them, 63.2% were married couples living together, 10.7% had a female householder with no husband present, and 23.4% were non-families. 18.9% of households were one person and 8.0% were one person aged 65 or older. The average household size was 2.61 and the average family size was 3.02.

The age distribution was 24.7% under the age of 18, 9.1% from 18 to 24, 29.5% from 25 to 44, 26.2% from 45 to 64, and 10.5% 65 or older. The median age was 39 years. For every 100 females, there were 93.7 males. For every 100 females age 18 and over, there were 91.1 males.

The median household income was $46,552 and the median family income was $56,250. Males had a median income of $37,438 versus $25,179 for females. The per capita income for the village was $20,626. About 3.1% of families and 2.9% of the population were below the poverty line, including 2.8% of those under age 18 and 11.1% of those age 65 or over.

== Education ==
It is in the Rockridge Community Unit School District 300.
