= Reynolds, Illinois =

- Village
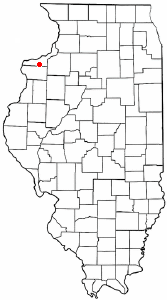
- Location of Reynolds, Illinois

- Location in Rock Island and Mercer counties, Illinois

- Location in the United States
- Coordinates: 41°19′55″N 90°40′20″W
- Country: United States
- State: Illinois
- Counties: Rock Island, Mercer
- Townships: Edgington, Bowling, Perryton, Preemption

Area
  - Total: 0.37 sq mi (0.95 km^{2})
  - Land: 0.37 sq mi (0.95 km^{2})
  - Water: 0 sq mi (0.00 km^{2})
- Elevation: 801 ft (244 m)

Population (2020)
  - Total: 498
  - Density: 1,353.1/sq mi (522.42/km^{2})
- Time zone: UTC-6 (CST)
  - Summer (DST): UTC-5 (CDT)
- ZIP code: 61279
- Area code: 309
- FIPS code: 17-63420
- GNIS feature ID: 2399061

Reynolds is a village mainly in Rock Island County in the U.S. state of Illinois. The population was 498 at the 2020 census. A small portion on the south side is in Mercer County. The village was founded in 1876.

== Geography ==
Reynolds is located along the southern border of Rock Island County. Perryton Street, the southernmost street in the village, follows the county line, and the village limits include buildings on the south side of the street, in Mercer County.

Illinois Route 94 passes through the village on Main Street, leading north 4 miles (6 km) to Taylor Ridge and south-southwest 13 miles (21 km) to Aledo. Rock Island is 15 miles (24 km) north-northeast of Reynolds.

According to the U.S. Census Bureau, the village has a total area of 0.37 square miles (0.96 km^{2}), all land. The headwaters of Mill Creek runs through the center of the village, flowing north to the Rock River in Milan.

== Demographics ==
Historical population
| Census | Pop. | Note | %± |
|---|---|---|---|
| 1880 | 192 | | — |
| 1900 | 329 | | — |
| 1910 | 367 | | 11.6% |
| 1920 | 322 | | −12.3% |
| 1930 | 317 | | −1.6% |
| 1940 | 335 | | 5.7% |
| 1950 | 409 | | 22.1% |
| 1960 | 494 | | 20.8% |
| 1970 | 610 | | 23.5% |
| 1980 | 701 | | 14.9% |
| 1990 | 583 | | −16.8% |
| 2000 | 508 | | −12.9% |
| 2010 | 539 | | 6.1% |
| 2020 | 498 | | −7.6% |
U.S. Decennial Census

=== 2020 census ===
Reynolds village, Illinois – Racial and ethnic composition Note: the US Census treats Hispanic/Latino as an ethnic category. This table excludes Latinos from the racial categories and assigns them to a separate category. Hispanics/Latinos may be of any race.
| Race / Ethnicity (NH = Non-Hispanic) | Pop 2000 | Pop 2010 | Pop 2020 | % 2000 | % 2010 | % 2020 |
|---|---|---|---|---|---|---|
| White alone (NH) | 503 | 524 | 467 | 99.02% | 97.22% | 93.78% |
| Black or African American alone (NH) | 0 | 0 | 2 | 0.00% | 0.00% | 0.40% |
| Native American or Alaska Native alone (NH) | 0 | 0 | 0 | 0.00% | 0.00% | 0.00% |
| Asian alone (NH) | 0 | 0 | 0 | 0.00% | 0.00% | 0.00% |
| Native Hawaiian or Pacific Islander alone (NH) | 0 | 0 | 0 | 0.00% | 0.00% | 0.00% |
| Other race alone (NH) | 0 | 0 | 1 | 0.00% | 0.00% | 0.20% |
| Mixed race or Multiracial (NH) | 0 | 5 | 20 | 0.00% | 0.93% | 4.02% |
| Hispanic or Latino (any race) | 5 | 10 | 8 | 0.98% | 1.86% | 1.61% |
| Total | 508 | 539 | 498 | 100.00% | 100.00% | 100.00% |

=== 2000 census ===
At the 2000 census there were 508 people, 206 households, and 154 families living in the village. The population density was 1,377.6 inhabitants per square mile (531.9/km^{2}). There were 221 housing units at an average density of 599.3 per square mile (231.4/km^{2}). The racial makeup of the village was 99.80% White, 0.20% from other races. Hispanic or Latino of any race were 0.98%.

Of the 206 households 29.1% had children under the age of 18 living with them, 55.3% were married couples living together, 15.0% had a female householder with no husband present, and 25.2% were non-families. 19.4% of households were one person and 10.2% were one person aged 65 or older. The average household size was 2.47 and the average family size was 2.76.

The age distribution was 21.9% under the age of 18, 12.2% from 18 to 24, 25.8% from 25 to 44, 26.6% from 45 to 64, and 13.6% 65 or older. The median age was 38 years. For every 100 females, there were 93.2 males. For every 100 females age 18 and over, there were 95.6 males.

The median household income was $42,917 and the median family income was $48,333. Males had a median income of $35,208 versus $21,364 for females. The per capita income for the village was $21,804. About 8.6% of families and 10.2% of the population were below the poverty line, including 19.7% of those under age 18 and 1.3% of those age 65 or over.

== Education ==
It is in the Rockridge Community Unit School District 300.
