= Illinois City, Illinois =

- Unincorporated community
- Location within Illinois Location within the United States
- Coordinates: 41°23′56″N 90°53′59″W
- Country: United States
- State: Illinois
- County: Rock Island

Area
  - Total: 0.46 sq mi (1.18 km^{2})
  - Land: 0.46 sq mi (1.18 km^{2})
  - Water: 0 sq mi (0.00 km^{2})
- Elevation: 768 ft (234 m)

Population (2020)
  - Total: 159
  - Density: 348.2/sq mi (134.44/km^{2})
- Time zone: UTC-6 (Central (CST))
  - Summer (DST): UTC-5 (CDT)
- ZIP code: 61259
- Area code: 309
- GNIS feature ID: 2806501

Illinois City is an unincorporated community in the U.S. state of Illinois, across the Mississippi River from Muscatine, Iowa. The community straddles Buffalo Prairie Township and Drury Township in Rock Island County, Illinois. As of the 2020 census, Illinois City had a population of 159.

== Demographics ==
Historical population
Census	Pop.	Note	%±
2020	159		—
U.S. Decennial Census

Illinois City first appeared as a census designated place in the 2020 U.S. census.

=== 2020 census ===
Illinois City CDP, Illinois – Racial and ethnic composition Note: the US Census treats Hispanic/Latino as an ethnic category. This table excludes Latinos from the racial categories and assigns them to a separate category. Hispanics/Latinos may be of any race.
Race / Ethnicity (NH = Non-Hispanic)	Pop 2020	% 2020
White alone (NH)	144	90.57%
Black or African American alone (NH)	0	0.00%
Native American or Alaska Native alone (NH)	0	0.00%
Asian alone (NH)	0	0.00%
Native Hawaiian or Pacific Islander alone (NH)	0	0.00%
Other race alone (NH)	0	0.00%
Mixed race or Multiracial (NH)	5	3.14%
Hispanic or Latino (any race)	10	6.29%
Total	159	100.00%

== Education ==
It is in the Rockridge Community Unit School District 300.
