= Edgington =

Edgington may refer to:

People:

- Alecia Webb-Edgington, Republican member of the Kentucky House of Representatives
- Dorothy Edgington, philosopher active in metaphysics and philosophical logic
- Nicola Edgington, British criminal convicted of murder, manslaughter and attempted murder

Places:

- Edgington, Illinois, unincorporated community in Rock Island County, Illinois, United States
- Edgington Township, Rock Island County, Illinois, located in Rock Island County, Illinois

== See also ==
- Edgington v Fitzmaurice (1885) 29 Ch D 459 is an English contract law case, concerning misrepresentation
