= Illinois Route 192 =

State highway in Rock Island County, Illinois, US

Illinois Route 192
- IL 192 highlighted in red

Route information
- Maintained by IDOT
- Length: 8.31 mi (13.37 km)
- Existed: 1955–present

Major junctions
- West end: IL 92 in Illinois City
- East end: IL 94 in Taylor Ridge

Location
- Country: United States
- State: Illinois
- Counties: Rock Island

Highway system
- Illinois State Highway System; Interstate; US; State; Tollways; Scenic
← I-190	→ IL 203

Illinois Route 192 is a 8.31-mile (13.37 km) east–west state highway in northwest Illinois. It runs from its western terminus at Illinois Route 92 northwest of Edgington to its eastern terminus at Illinois Route 94 in Taylor Ridge. The route is located entirely within Rock Island County. Route 192 is maintained by the Illinois Department of Transportation (IDOT).

== Route description ==
Route 192 primarily serves as a connector road between Route 92 and Route 94 southwest of Rock Island. The route's western terminus is a three-way junction with Route 92 northwest of Edgington. Route 192 heads south from this intersection as 175th Street before turning westward and becoming 134th Street. The highway enters the unincorporated community of Edgington and passes Rockridge High School. After leaving Edgington, the route continues eastward into Taylor Ridge, where it reaches its eastern terminus at a three-way intersection with Route 94. Route 192 is an undivided, two-lane surface road for its entire length.

== History ==
The road which is now Route 192 was constructed under the State Bond Issue bill of 1924 as part of Illinois Route 84, which was originally designated from the state line at Muscatine, Iowa to Taylor Ridge. The route was first included on Illinois highway maps in 1924. It was marked on state maps as part of Route 84 in 1929 and briefly became part of Illinois Route 2 in 1938. In 1939, IL 92 replaced part of IL 2 between Muscatine, Iowa and Rock Island. Route 92 was realigned to the north in 1955, and Route 192 was designated on its former alignment from west of Edgington to U.S. Route 67. The route originally formed a concurrency with Route 94 from Route 192's present eastern terminus to US 67. Route 192 was shortened to its present length by 1999.

== Major intersections ==
The entire route is in Rock Island County.

Location	mi	km	Destinations	Notes
	0.00	0.00	IL 92 / Great River Road	
	0.93	1.50	CR F (Andalusia Road, 175th Street West)	
Edgington	3.39	5.46	CR G (140th Street West)	
	5.96	9.59	CR H (105th Street West)	
Taylor Ridge	8.27	13.31	CR J (Turkey Hollow Road)	
Taylor Ridge	8.31	13.37	IL 94	
1.000 mi = 1.609 km; 1.000 km = 0.621 mi
