= Edgington, Illinois =

- Census-designated place
- Location within Illinois Location within the United States
- Coordinates: 41°23′13″N 90°45′49″W
- Country: United States
- State: Illinois
- County: Rock Island

Area
  - Total: 1.01 sq mi (2.62 km^{2})
  - Land: 1.01 sq mi (2.62 km^{2})
  - Water: 0 sq mi (0.00 km^{2})
- Elevation: 781 ft (238 m)

Population (2020)
  - Total: 391
  - Density: 386.6/sq mi (149.25/km^{2})
- Time zone: UTC-6 (Central (CST))
  - Summer (DST): UTC-5 (CDT)
- Zip Code: 61247
- Area code: 309
- FIPS code: 17-22619
- GNIS feature ID: 2806477

Edgington is an unincorporated community in Rock Island County, Illinois, United States. Edgington is located on Illinois Route 192, 4 miles (6.4 km) southwest of Andalusia. As of the 2020 census, Edgington had a population of 391.

== History ==
The Edgington post office closed in 1920. The community's name honors Daniel and John Edgington, pioneer settlers.

== Demographics ==
Historical population
Census	Pop.	Note	%±
2020	391		—
U.S. Decennial Census

Edgington first appeared as a census designated place in the 2020 U.S. census.

=== 2020 census ===
Edgington CDP, Illinois – Racial and ethnic composition Note: the US Census treats Hispanic/Latino as an ethnic category. This table excludes Latinos from the racial categories and assigns them to a separate category. Hispanics/Latinos may be of any race.
Race / Ethnicity (NH = Non-Hispanic)	Pop 2020	% 2020
White alone (NH)	374	95.65%
Black or African American alone (NH)	1	0.26%
Native American or Alaska Native alone (NH)	2	0.51%
Asian alone (NH)	0	0.00%
Native Hawaiian or Pacific Islander alone (NH)	0	0.00%
Other race alone (NH)	0	0.00%
Mixed race or Multiracial (NH)	2	0.51%
Hispanic or Latino (any race)	12	3.07%
Total	391	100.00%

== Education ==
It is in the Rockridge Community Unit School District 300.
