= Hanna Township =

Hanna Township may refer to the following townships in the United States:

- Hanna Township, Henry County, Illinois
- Hanna Township, LaPorte County, Indiana
