= Coyne Center, Illinois =

Coyne Center
- Census-designated place
- Location of Coyne Center within Illinois Coyne Center (the United States)
- Coordinates: 41°24′02″N 90°33′46″W
- Country: United States
- State: Illinois
- County: Rock Island

Area
  - Total: 1.72 sq mi (4.45 km^{2})
  - Land: 1.72 sq mi (4.45 km^{2})
  - Water: 0 sq mi (0.00 km^{2})
- Elevation: 738 ft (225 m)

Population (2020)
  - Total: 877
  - Density: 510/sq mi (196.9/km^{2})
- Time zone: UTC-6 (CST)
  - Summer (DST): UTC-5 (CDT)
- ZIP code: 61264
- Area code: 309
- FIPS code: 17-17077
- GNIS feature ID: 2393388

Coyne Center is a census-designated place (CDP) in Rock Island County, Illinois, United States. As of the 2020 census, Coyne Center had a population of 877.

== Geography ==
According to the United States Census Bureau, the CDP has a total area of 1.8 square miles (4.7 km^{2}), all land.

== Demographics ==
Historical population
Census	Pop.	Note	%±
2000	906		—
2010	827		−8.7%
2020	877		6.0%
U.S. Decennial Census

=== 2020 census ===
Coyne Center CDP, Illinois – Racial and ethnic composition Note: the US Census treats Hispanic/Latino as an ethnic category. This table excludes Latinos from the racial categories and assigns them to a separate category. Hispanics/Latinos may be of any race.
Race / Ethnicity (NH = Non-Hispanic)	Pop 2000	Pop 2010	Pop 2020	% 2000	% 2010	% 2020
White alone (NH)	888	793	784	98.01%	95.89%	89.40%
Black or African American alone (NH)	7	6	13	0.77%	0.73%	1.48%
Native American or Alaska Native alone (NH)	0	0	0	0.00%	0.00%	0.00%
Asian alone (NH)	1	0	0	0.11%	0.00%	0.00%
Native Hawaiian or Pacific Islander alone (NH)	0	5	0	0.00%	0.60%	0.00%
Other race alone (NH)	0	0	0	0.00%	0.00%	0.00%
Mixed race or Multiracial (NH)	2	11	53	0.22%	1.33%	6.04%
Hispanic or Latino (any race)	8	12	27	0.88%	1.45%	3.08%
Total	906	827	877	100.00%	100.00%	100.00%

=== 2000 census ===
At the 2000 census there were 906 people, 352 households, and 290 families living in the CDP. The population density was 505.4 inhabitants per square mile (195.1/km^{2}). There were 356 housing units at an average density of 198.6 per square mile (76.7/km^{2}). The racial makeup of the CDP was 98.68% White, 0.77% African American, 0.11% Asian, 0.22% from other races, and 0.22% from two or more races. Hispanic or Latino of any race were 0.88%.

Of the 352 households 28.1% had children under the age of 18 living with them, 71.3% were married couples living together, 6.8% had a female householder with no husband present, and 17.6% were non-families. 12.5% of households were one person and 4.8% were one person aged 65 or older. The average household size was 2.57 and the average family size was 2.80.

The age distribution was 20.8% under the age of 18, 5.4% from 18 to 24, 25.1% from 25 to 44, 33.1% from 45 to 64, and 15.7% 65 or older. The median age was 44 years. For every 100 females, there were 99.6 males. For every 100 females age 18 and over, there were 97.8 males.

The median household income was $50,000 and the median family income was $47,422. Males had a median income of $30,909 versus $23,750 for females. The per capita income for the CDP was $19,093. About 3.1% of families and 4.3% of the population were below the poverty line, including 6.6% of those under age 18 and 1.3% of those age 65 or over.

== Education ==
It is in the Sherrard Community Unit School District 200.
