= Labriscorpio =

Labriscorpio Temporal range: Early Pennsylvanian–Late Mississippian

Scientific classification
- Kingdom: Animalia
- Phylum: Arthropoda
- Subphylum: Chelicerata
- Class: Arachnida
- Order: Scorpiones
- Family: †Proscorpiidae
- Genus: †Labriscorpio; Leary, 1980
- Species: †L. alliedensis

Binomial name
- †Labriscorpio alliedensis Leary, 1980

Genus of fossil scorpions

Labriscorpio is a fossil genus of scorpions in the family Proscorpiidae, containing a single species, Labriscorpio alliedensis. This species was discovered in Rock Island County, Illinois and lived during the Carboniferous period.
