= Geneseo Township, Henry County, Illinois =

Geneseo Township
- Township
- Location in Henry County

- Henry County's location in Illinois
- Coordinates: 41°27′18″N 90°08′41″W
- Country: United States
- State: Illinois
- County: Henry
- Established: November 4, 1856

Area
  - Total: 36.36 sq mi (94.2 km^{2})
  - Land: 36.28 sq mi (94.0 km^{2})
  - Water: 0.08 sq mi (0.21 km^{2}) 0.22%
- Elevation: 643 ft (196 m)

Population (2020)
  - Total: 7,567
  - Density: 208.6/sq mi (80.53/km^{2})
- Time zone: UTC-6 (CST)
  - Summer (DST): UTC-5 (CDT)
- ZIP codes: 61235, 61254
- FIPS code: 17-073-28859

Geneseo Township is one of twenty-four townships in Henry County, Illinois, USA. As of the 2020 census, its population was 7,567 and it contained 3,532 housing units.

== Geography ==
According to the 2021 census gazetteer files, Geneseo Township has a total area of 36.36 square miles (94.17 km^{2}), of which 36.28 square miles (93.96 km^{2}) (or 99.78%) is land and 0.08 square miles (0.21 km^{2}) (or 0.22%) is water.

=== Cities, towns, villages ===
- Geneseo

=== Adjacent townships ===
- Phenix Township (north)
- Loraine Township (northeast)
- Atkinson Township (east)
- Cornwall Township (southeast)
- Munson Township (south)
- Osco Township (southwest)
- Edford Township (west)
- Hanna Township (west)

=== Cemeteries ===
The township contains these three cemeteries: Mizpan, North and Oakwood.

=== Major highways ===
- Interstate 80
- U.S. Route 6
- Illinois Route 82

=== Airports and landing strips ===
- Black Hawk Heliport
- Dewey E Greene Airport
- Gen Airpark

=== Landmarks ===
- Hennepin Canal Parkway State Park (east half and west edge)
- Richmond Hill Park

== Demographics ==
As of the 2020 census there were 7,567 people, 3,169 households, and 2,115 families residing in the township. The population density was 208.12 inhabitants per square mile (80.36/km^{2}). There were 3,532 housing units at an average density of 97.15 per square mile (37.51/km^{2}). The racial makeup of the township was 93.11% White, 0.50% African American, 0.19% Native American, 0.66% Asian, 0.04% Pacific Islander, 0.78% from other races, and 4.72% from two or more races. Hispanic or Latino of any race were 2.96% of the population.

There were 3,169 households, out of which 31.70% had children under the age of 18 living with them, 50.99% were married couples living together, 8.71% had a female householder with no spouse present, and 33.26% were non-families. 31.60% of all households were made up of individuals, and 21.60% had someone living alone who was 65 years of age or older. The average household size was 2.29 and the average family size was 2.78.

The township's age distribution consisted of 23.3% under the age of 18, 4.8% from 18 to 24, 21.4% from 25 to 44, 23.5% from 45 to 64, and 26.9% who were 65 years of age or older. The median age was 45.5 years. For every 100 females, there were 91.2 males. For every 100 females age 18 and over, there were 90.7 males.

The median income for a household in the township was $60,207, and the median income for a family was $76,691. Males had a median income of $56,801 versus $27,068 for females. The per capita income for the township was $33,243. About 4.0% of families and 5.3% of the population were below the poverty line, including 10.5% of those under age 18 and 1.2% of those age 65 or over.

Historical population
Census	Pop.	Note	%±
2000	7,244		—
2010	7,468		3.1%
2020	7,567		1.3%
U.S. Decennial Census

== School districts ==
- Geneseo Community Unit School District 228

== Political districts ==
- Illinois's 14th congressional district
- State House District 71
- State House District 90
- State Senate District 36
- State Senate District 45
