= Yorktown Township, Henry County, Illinois =

Yorktown Township
- Township
- Location in Henry County

- Henry County's location in Illinois
- Coordinates: 41°32′15″N 89°54′59″W
- Country: United States
- State: Illinois
- County: Henry
- Established: November 4, 1856

Area
  - Total: 35.73 sq mi (92.5 km^{2})
  - Land: 35.73 sq mi (92.5 km^{2})
  - Water: 0 sq mi (0 km^{2}) 0%
- Elevation: 630 ft (192 m)

Population (2020)
  - Total: 447
  - Density: 12.5/sq mi (4.83/km^{2})
- Time zone: UTC-6 (CST)
  - Summer (DST): UTC-5 (CDT)
- ZIP codes: 61234, 61250, 61277, 61283
- FIPS code: 17-073-84012

Yorktown Township is one of twenty-four townships in Henry County, Illinois, USA. As of the 2020 census, its population was 447 and it contained 185 housing units.

== Geography ==
According to the 2021 census gazetteer files, Yorktown Township has a total area of 35.73 square miles (92.54 km^{2}), all land.

=== Cities, towns, villages ===
- Hooppole

=== Unincorporated towns ===
- Aliceville at 41.552255°N 89.879552°W

(This list is based on USGS data and may include former settlements.)

=== Adjacent townships ===
- Prophetstown Township, Whiteside County (north)
- Tampico Township, Whiteside County (northeast)
- Fairfield Township, Bureau County (east)
- Gold Township, Bureau County (southeast)
- Alba Township (south)
- Atkinson Township (southwest)
- Loraine Township (west)

=== Cemeteries ===
The township contains these two cemeteries: Hooppole and Saint Marys.

=== Major highways ===
- Illinois Route 78
- Illinois Route 92

== Demographics ==
As of the 2020 census there were 447 people, 168 households, and 114 families residing in the township. The population density was 12.51 inhabitants per square mile (4.83/km^{2}). There were 185 housing units at an average density of 5.18 per square mile (2.00/km^{2}). The racial makeup of the township was 94.63% White, 0.89% African American, 0.00% Native American, 0.00% Asian, 0.00% Pacific Islander, 2.91% from other races, and 1.57% from two or more races. Hispanic or Latino of any race were 3.13% of the population.

There were 168 households, out of which 32.10% had children under the age of 18 living with them, 57.14% were married couples living together, 6.55% had a female householder with no spouse present, and 32.14% were non-families. 16.70% of all households were made up of individuals, and 0.60% had someone living alone who was 65 years of age or older. The average household size was 2.95 and the average family size was 3.16.

The township's age distribution consisted of 19.6% under the age of 18, 1.6% from 18 to 24, 29.9% from 25 to 44, 33% from 45 to 64, and 16.0% who were 65 years of age or older. The median age was 43.6 years. For every 100 females, there were 129.2 males. For every 100 females age 18 and over, there were 119.9 males.

The median income for a household in the township was $91,667, and the median income for a family was $91,875. Males had a median income of $76,406 versus $28,750 for females. The per capita income for the township was $43,164. About 7.0% of families and 14.5% of the population were below the poverty line, including 7.0% of those under age 18 and none of those age 65 or over.

Historical population
| Census | Pop. | Note | %± |
|---|---|---|---|
| 2000 | 420 | | — |
| 2010 | 431 | | 2.6% |
| 2020 | 447 | | 3.7% |
U.S. Decennial Census

== School districts ==
- Annawan Community Unit School District 226
- Geneseo Community Unit School District 228
- Prophetstown-Lyndon-Tampico Community Unit School District 3

== Political districts ==
- Illinois's 14th congressional district
- State House District 90
- State Senate District 45
