= Dayton, Henry County, Illinois =

Dayton
- Unincorporated community
- Location within Illinois Location within the United States
- Coordinates: 41°29′21″N 90°19′17″W
- Country: USA
- State: Illinois
- County: Henry County
- Township: Colona Township
- Elevation: 182 m (597 ft)
- Time zone: UTC-6 (CST)
  - Summer (DST): UTC-5 (CDT)
- ZIP code: 61241
- Area code: 309
- GNIS feature ID: 0407006

Dayton is an unincorporated community in Colona Township, Henry County, Illinois, United States.

== History ==
One of the oldest towns in the county, the town of Dayton was laid out in October 1836. It was once a stop on the Chicago, Dixon and Rock Island stage route. The community most likely took its name after Dayton, Ohio.

== Geography ==
The town is located in the northwest part of the county just south of Cleveland.
