= Rural (disambiguation) =

A rural area is a geographic area that is located outside cities and towns.

Rural may also refer to:

== Places ==
- Rural, Indiana, an unincorporated community in Randolph County
- Rural, Ohio, an unincorporated community in Clermont County
- Rural, Wisconsin, an unincorporated community in Dayton, Waupaca County

== Arts, entertainment, and media ==
- Rural TV, a British television channel
- The Rural Channel, a Canadian television channel
- TV Rural, a Portuguese television program

== Other uses ==
- Feist v. Rural, a decision by the Supreme Court of the United States
- La Rural, an agricultural and livestock show in Buenos Aires, Argentina
- Universidad Rural, a school in Guatemala

== See also ==
- Rural Township (disambiguation)
