= Edginton =

Edginton is a surname. Notable people with the surname include:

- Barrie Edginton (born 1967), British windsurfer
- Ian Edginton (born 1963), British graphic novelist
- May Edginton (1883–1957), British writer

== See also ==
- Edgington (disambiguation)
