= South Rock Island Township, Rock Island County, Illinois =

Coordinates: 41°28′35″N 90°34′11″W

South Rock Island Township
- Township
- Location in Rock Island County

- Rock Island County's location in Illinois
- Country: United States
- State: Illinois
- County: Rock Island
- Established: March 1, 1878

Area
  - Total: 7.48 sq mi (19.4 km^{2})
  - Land: 6.97 sq mi (18.1 km^{2})
  - Water: 0.51 sq mi (1.3 km^{2}) 6.82%

Population (2010)
  - Estimate (2016): 18,012
  - Density: 2,640.7/sq mi (1,019.6/km^{2})
- Time zone: UTC-6 (CST)
  - Summer (DST): UTC-5 (CDT)
- FIPS code: 17-161-71201

South Rock Island Township is located in Rock Island County, Illinois. As of the 2010 census, its population was 18,407 and it contained 8,951 housing units. South Rock Island Township formed from Rock Island Township on March 1, 1878.

== Geography ==
According to the 2010 census, the township has a total area of 7.48 square miles (19.4 km^{2}), of which 6.97 square miles (18.1 km^{2}) (or 93.18%) is land and 0.51 square miles (1.3 km^{2}) (or 6.82%) is water.

== Demographics ==
Historical population
Census	Pop.	Note	%±
2016 (est.)	18,012
U.S. Decennial Census
