= Hillsdale, Illinois =

Hillsdale
- Village
- Location of Hillsdale in Rock Island County, Illinois.

- Location of Illinois in the United States
- Coordinates: 41°36′38″N 90°10′30″W
- Country: United States
- State: Illinois
- County: Rock Island

Area
  - Total: 0.68 sq mi (1.75 km^{2})
  - Land: 0.65 sq mi (1.68 km^{2})
  - Water: 0.027 sq mi (0.07 km^{2})
- Elevation: 584 ft (178 m)

Population (2020)
  - Total: 531
  - Density: 643.5/sq mi (248.46/km^{2})
- Time zone: UTC-6 (CST)
  - Summer (DST): UTC-5 (CDT)
- ZIP Code(s): 61257
- Area code: 309
- FIPS code: 17-35073
- GNIS feature ID: 2398508

Hillsdale is a village in Rock Island County, Illinois, United States. The population was around 531 at the time of the 2020 census, up from around 523 at the 2010 census.

== Geography ==
According to the 2010 census, Hillsdale has a total area of 0.779 square miles (2.02 km^{2}), of which 0.75 square miles (1.94 km^{2}) (96.28%) is land and 0.029 square miles (0.08 km^{2}) (3.72%) is water.

== Demographics ==
Historical population
Census	Pop.	Note	%±
1880	37		—
1960	490		—
1970	539		10.0%
1980	731		35.6%
1990	489		−33.1%
2000	588		20.2%
2010	523		−11.1%
2020	417		−20.3%
U.S. Decennial Census

=== 2020 census ===
Hillside village, Illinois – Racial and ethnic composition Note: the US Census treats Hispanic/Latino as an ethnic category. This table excludes Latinos from the racial categories and assigns them to a separate category. Hispanics/Latinos may be of any race.
Race / Ethnicity (NH = Non-Hispanic)	Pop 2000	Pop 2010	Pop 2020	% 2000	% 2010	% 2020
White alone (NH)	560	484	384	95.24%	92.54%	92.09%
Black or African American alone (NH)	3	3	1	0.51%	0.57%	0.24%
Native American or Alaska Native alone (NH)	3	1	1	0.51%	0.19%	0.24%
Asian alone (NH)	0	0	0	0.00%	0.00%	0.00%
Native Hawaiian or Pacific Islander alone (NH)	0	0	0	0.00%	0.00%	0.00%
Other race alone (NH)	0	0	2	0.00%	0.00%	0.48%
Mixed race or Multiracial (NH)	7	9	16	1.19%	1.72%	3.84%
Hispanic or Latino (any race)	16	26	13	2.72%	4.97%	3.12%
Total	589	523	417	100.00%	100.00%	100.00%

=== 2000 census ===
At the 2000 census, there were 588 people, 219 households and 157 families living in the village. The population density was 780.2 per square mile (301.2/km^{2}). There were 237 housing units at an average density of 314.5 per square mile (121.4/km^{2}). The racial make-up was 95.75% White, 0.51% African American, 0.68% Native American, 1.70% from other races and 1.36% from two or more races. Hispanic or Latino of any race were 2.72%.

Of the 219 households, 35.6% had children under the age of 18 living with them, 52.5% were married couples living together, 14.6% had a female householder with no husband present and 28.3% were non-families. 21.9% of households were one person and 4.1% were one person aged 65 or older. The average household size was 2.68 and the average family size was 3.13.

The age distribution was 28.7% under the age of 18, 8.2% from 18 to 24, 31.8% from 25 to 44, 21.8% from 45 to 64, and 9.5% 65 or older. The median age was 34 years. For every 100 females, there were 89.1 males. For every 100 females age 18 and over, there were 94.0 males.

The median household income was $46,964 and the median family income was $49,519. Males had a median income of $31,250 and females $20,313. The per capita income was $21,772. About 9.2% of families and 11.0% of the population were below the poverty line, including 15.2% of those under age 18 and none of those age 65 or over.

== Education ==
It is in the Riverdale Community Unit School District 100.
