= Andalusia Township, Rock Island County, Illinois =

Andalusia Township
- Township
- Location in Rock Island County

- Rock Island County's location in Illinois
- Country: United States
- State: Illinois
- County: Rock Island
- Established: September, 1858

Area
  - Total: 15.46 sq mi (40.0 km^{2})
  - Land: 12.81 sq mi (33.2 km^{2})
  - Water: 2.65 sq mi (6.9 km^{2}) 17.14%

Population (2010)
  - Estimate (2016): 2,281
  - Density: 179.5/sq mi (69.3/km^{2})
- Time zone: UTC-6 (CST)
  - Summer (DST): UTC-5 (CDT)
- FIPS code: 17-161-01439
- Website: www.andalusiatownship.org

Andalusia Township is located in Rock Island County, Illinois. As of the 2010 census, its population was 2,299 and it contained 920 housing units. Andalusia Township was formed from Edgington Township in September, 1858.

== Geography ==
According to the 2010 census, the township has a total area of 15.46 square miles (40.0 km^{2}), of which 12.81 square miles (33.2 km^{2}) (or 82.86%) is land and 2.65 square miles (6.9 km^{2}) (or 17.14%) is water.

== Demographics ==
Historical population
Census	Pop.	Note	%±
2016 (est.)	2,281
U.S. Decennial Census
