= Taylor Ridge, Illinois =

- Unincorporated community
- Location within Illinois Location within the United States
- Coordinates: 41°23′21″N 90°40′14″W
- Country: United States
- State: Illinois
- County: Rock Island

Area
  - Total: 1.55 sq mi (4.02 km^{2})
  - Land: 1.55 sq mi (4.02 km^{2})
  - Water: 0 sq mi (0.00 km^{2})
- Elevation: 781 ft (238 m)

Population (2020)
  - Total: 141
  - Density: 90.8/sq mi (35.07/km^{2})
- Time zone: UTC-6 (Central (CST))
  - Summer (DST): UTC-5 (CDT)
- ZIP code: 61284
- Area code: 309
- GNIS feature ID: 2806570

Taylor Ridge is a census-designated place (CDP) in Rock Island County, Illinois, United States. As of the 2020 census, Taylor Ridge had a population of 141. Taylor Ridge is located at the junction of Illinois Route 94 and Illinois Route 192, 4 miles (6.4 km) north of Reynolds. Taylor Ridge has a post office with ZIP code 61284.

== Demographics ==
Historical population
Census	Pop.	Note	%±
2020	141		—
U.S. Decennial Census

Taylor Ridge first appeared as a census designated place in the 2020 U.S. census.

=== 2020 census ===
Taylor Ridge CDP, Illinois – Racial and ethnic composition Note: the US Census treats Hispanic/Latino as an ethnic category. This table excludes Latinos from the racial categories and assigns them to a separate category. Hispanics/Latinos may be of any race.
Race / Ethnicity (NH = Non-Hispanic)	Pop 2020	% 2020
White alone (NH)	127	90.97%
Black or African American alone (NH)	0	0.00%
Native American or Alaska Native alone (NH)	1	0.71%
Asian alone (NH)	0	0.00%
Native Hawaiian or Pacific Islander alone (NH)	0	0.00%
Other race alone (NH)	0	0.00%
Mixed race or Multiracial (NH)	8	5.67%
Hispanic or Latino (any race)	5	3.55%
Total	141	100.00%

== Education ==
It is in the Rockridge Community Unit School District 300.

== Notable people ==
- Herb Crompton, MLB catcher, was born in Taylor Ridge in 1911
- Mona Martin, Iowa Legislator and Iowa Women's Hall of Fame inductee, born in Taylor Ridge 1934
- Bryan Saulpaugh, racing driver
