= Herb Crompton =

American baseball player (1911-1963)

- Catcher
- Born: November 7, 1911; Taylor Ridge, Illinois, U.S.
- Died: August 5, 1963 (aged 51); Moline, Illinois, U.S.
- Batted: Right Threw: Right

MLB debut
- April 26, 1937, for the Washington Senators

Last MLB appearance
- September 12, 1945, for the New York Yankees

MLB statistics
- Batting average: .196
- Home runs: 0
- Runs batted in: 12
- Stats at Baseball Reference

Teams
- Washington Senators (1937); New York Yankees (1945)

Herbert Bryan "Workhorse" Crompton (November 7, 1911 – August 5, 1963) was an American Major League Baseball catcher. Crompton played for the Washington Senators in 1937 and the New York Yankees in 1945, an eight-year difference between his two seasons during which he worked on the coaching staff of minor league teams. He played in two games for Washington, having 1 hit in 3 at-bats. For the Yankees, he played in 36 games, having 19 hits for 99 at-bats. He batted and threw right-handed.

Crompton was born in Taylor Ridge, Illinois, and died in Moline, Illinois.
