= South Moline Township, Rock Island County, Illinois =

Coordinates: 41°29′13″N 90°28′13″W

South Moline Township
- Township
- Location in Rock Island County

- Rock Island County's location in Illinois
- Country: United States
- State: Illinois
- County: Rock Island
- Established: March 1879

Area
  - Total: 16.95 sq mi (43.9 km^{2})
  - Land: 15.99 sq mi (41.4 km^{2})
  - Water: 0.97 sq mi (2.5 km^{2}) 5.72%

Population (2010)
  - Estimate (2016): 35,826
  - Density: 2,277/sq mi (879/km^{2})
- Time zone: UTC-6 (CST)
  - Summer (DST): UTC-5 (CDT)
- FIPS code: 17-161-70993
- Website: southmolinetownship.com

South Moline Township is located in Rock Island County, Illinois. As of the 2010 census, its population was 36,399 and it contained 17,140 housing units. South Moline Township formed from Moline Township in March, 1879.

== Geography ==
According to the 2010 census, the township has a total area of 16.95 square miles (43.9 km^{2}), of which 15.99 square miles (41.4 km^{2}) (or 94.34%) is land and 0.97 square miles (2.5 km^{2}) (or 5.72%) is water.

== Demographics ==
Historical population
Census	Pop.	Note	%±
2016 (est.)	35,826
U.S. Decennial Census
