= Rapids City, Illinois =

Rapids City
- Village
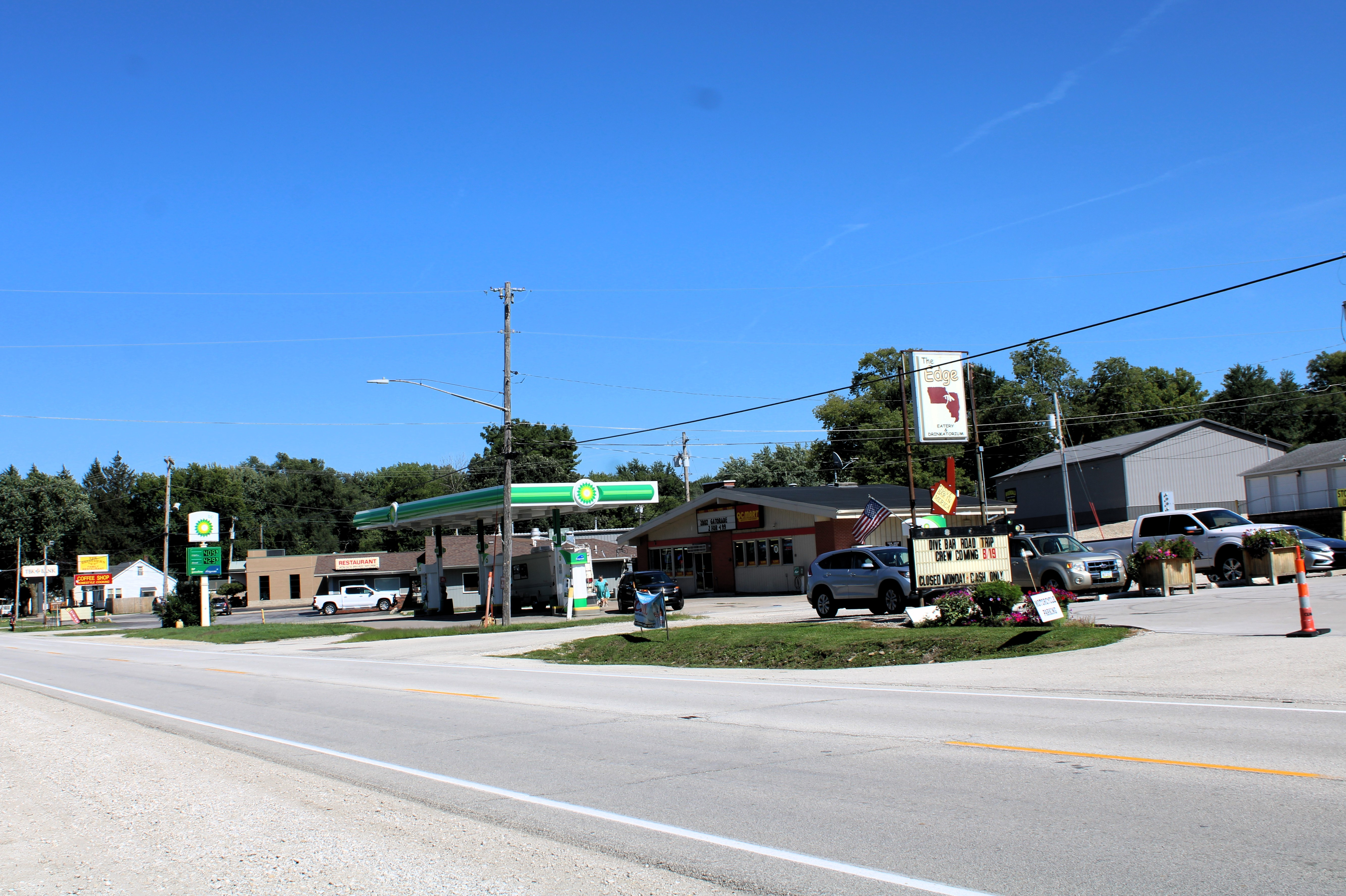
- Businesses along Illinois 84

- Location of Rapids City in Rock Island County, Illinois.

- Location of Illinois in the United States
- Coordinates: 41°34′43″N 90°20′23″W
- Country: United States
- State: Illinois
- County: Rock Island

Area
  - Total: 1.63 sq mi (4.21 km^{2})
  - Land: 1.63 sq mi (4.21 km^{2})
  - Water: 0 sq mi (0.00 km^{2})
- Elevation: 682 ft (208 m)

Population (2020)
  - Total: 964
  - Density: 593/sq mi (228.9/km^{2})
- Time zone: UTC-6 (CST)
  - Summer (DST): UTC-5 (CDT)
- ZIP Code(s): 61275
- Area code: 309
- FIPS code: 17-62822
- GNIS feature ID: 2399043
- Website: www.rapidscity.us

Rapids City is a village in Rock Island County, Illinois, United States. The population was 964 at the time of the 2020 census; up from 959 at the 2010 census.

== Geography ==
According to the 2010 census, Rapids City has a total area of 1.62 square miles (4.20 km^{2}), all land.

== Demographics ==
Historical population
Census	Pop.	Note	%±
1880	920		—
1890	288		−68.7%
1900	212		−26.4%
1910	143		−32.5%
1920	142		−0.7%
1930	199		40.1%
1940	275		38.2%
1950	487		77.1%
1960	675		38.6%
1970	656		−2.8%
1980	1,058		61.3%
1990	932		−11.9%
2000	953		2.3%
2010	959		0.6%
2020	964		0.5%
U.S. Decennial Census

=== 2020 census ===
Rapids City village, Illinois – Racial and ethnic composition Note: the US Census treats Hispanic/Latino as an ethnic category. This table excludes Latinos from the racial categories and assigns them to a separate category. Hispanics/Latinos may be of any race.
Race / Ethnicity (NH = Non-Hispanic)	Pop 2000	Pop 2010	Pop 2020	% 2000	% 2010	% 2020
White alone (NH)	924	922	889	96.96%	96.14%	92.22%
Black or African American alone (NH)	0	2	8	0.00%	0.21%	0.83%
Native American or Alaska Native alone (NH)	0	1	1	0.00%	0.10%	0.10%
Asian alone (NH)	1	3	1	0.10%	0.31%	0.10%
Native Hawaiian or Pacific Islander alone (NH)	1	0	0	0.10%	0.00%	0.00%
Other race alone (NH)	1	0	1	0.10%	0.00%	0.10%
Mixed race or Multiracial (NH)	6	10	27	0.63%	1.04%	2.80%
Hispanic or Latino (any race)	20	21	37	2.10%	2.19%	3.84%
Total	953	959	964	100.00%	100.00%	100.00%

=== 2000 census ===
As of the census of 2000, there were 953 people, 352 households, and 280 families residing in the village. The population density was 623.0 inhabitants per square mile (240.5/km^{2}). There were 367 housing units at an average density of 239.9 per square mile (92.6/km^{2}). The racial makeup of the village was 98.53% White, 0.10% Asian, 0.10% Pacific Islander, 0.52% from other races, and 0.73% from two or more races. Hispanic or Latino of any race were 2.10% of the population.

There were 352 households, out of which 34.1% had children under the age of 18 living with them, 70.2% were married couples living together, 5.7% had a female householder with no husband present, and 20.2% were non-families. 16.2% of all households were made up of individuals, and 5.4% had someone living alone who was 65 years of age or older. The average household size was 2.71 and the average family size was 3.05.

In the village, the population was spread out, with 25.1% under the age of 18, 7.7% from 18 to 24, 28.3% from 25 to 44, 29.5% from 45 to 64, and 9.4% who were 65 years of age or older. The median age was 39 years. For every 100 females, there were 100.6 males. For every 100 females age 18 and over, there were 97.2 males.

The median income for a household in the village was $44,474, and the median income for a family was $50,893. Males had a median income of $43,125 versus $24,808 for females. The per capita income for the village was $24,499. About 0.8% of families and 3.0% of the population were below the poverty line, including 4.8% of those under age 18 and none of those age 65 or over.

== Education ==
It is in the Riverdale Community Unit School District 100.
