= Barstow, Illinois =

- Census-designated place
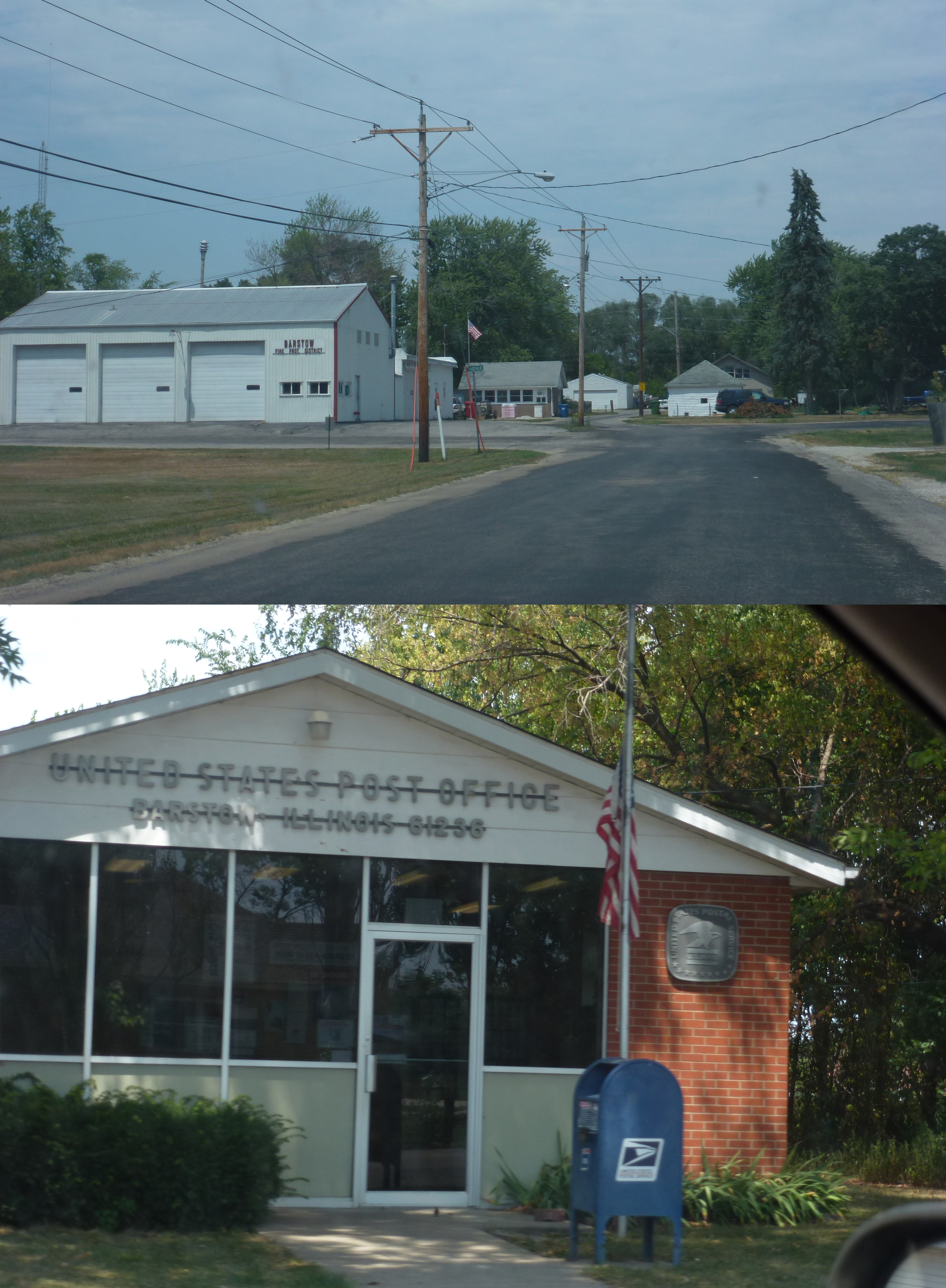
- Barstow Fire Station and Post Office

- Location within Illinois Location within the United States
- Coordinates: 41°31′06″N 90°21′25″W
- Country: United States
- State: Illinois
- County: Rock Island

Area
  - Total: 0.11 sq mi (0.28 km^{2})
  - Land: 0.11 sq mi (0.28 km^{2})
  - Water: 0 sq mi (0.00 km^{2})
- Elevation: 574 ft (175 m)

Population (2020)
  - Total: 89
  - Density: 838.1/sq mi (323.61/km^{2})
- Time zone: UTC-6 (Central (CST))
  - Summer (DST): UTC-5 (CDT)
- Area code: 309
- FIPS code: 17-03987
- GNIS feature ID: 403936

Barstow is an unincorporated community in Rock Island County, Illinois, United States. As of the 2020 census, Barstow had a population of 89. Barstow is east of East Moline and Silvis. Barstow is located on a wye that connects track owned by the BNSF Railway, including the Barstow Subdivision. These tracks were previously owned by the Chicago, Burlington and Quincy Railroad (CB&Q), and a station once existed within the wye.

Barstow was to be the site of a planned hog plant and a Nascar race track, but both plans were shelved after heavy opposition to them.

== Demographics ==
Historical population
Census	Pop.	Note	%±
2020	89		—
U.S. Decennial Census

Barstow first appeared as a census designated place in the 2020 U.S. census.

=== 2020 census ===
Barstow CDP, Illinois – Racial and ethnic composition Note: the US Census treats Hispanic/Latino as an ethnic category. This table excludes Latinos from the racial categories and assigns them to a separate category. Hispanics/Latinos may be of any race.
Race / Ethnicity (NH = Non-Hispanic)	Pop 2020	% 2020
White alone (NH)	83	93.26%
Black or African American alone (NH)	0	0.00%
Native American or Alaska Native alone (NH)	0	0.00%
Asian alone (NH)	0	0.00%
Native Hawaiian or Pacific Islander alone (NH)	0	0.00%
Other race alone (NH)	1	1.12%
Mixed race or Multiracial (NH)	1	1.12%
Hispanic or Latino (any race)	4	4.49%
Total	89	100.00%

Preceding station	Burlington Route	Following station
Colona toward St. Louis	St. Louis – Savanna	East Moline toward Savanna
Terminus	Barstow – Earlville	Joslin toward Earlville
