= Len Stockwell =

American baseball player (1859–1905)

- Outfielder
- Born: August 25, 1859; Cordova, Illinois, U.S.
- Died: January 28, 1905 (aged 45); Niles, California, U.S.
- Batted: Right Threw: Right

MLB debut
- May 17, 1879, for the Cleveland Blues

Last MLB appearance
- May 19, 1890, for the Cleveland Spiders

MLB statistics
- At bats: 22
- RBI: 0
- Home runs: 0
- Batting average: .136
- Stats at Baseball Reference

Teams
- Cleveland Blues (1879); Louisville Eclipse (1884); Cleveland Spiders (1890)

Leonard Clark Stockwell (August 25, 1859 – January 28, 1905) was an American professional baseball player who played outfield, first base, and catcher from 1879 to 1890. He was born in Cordova, Illinois and died in Niles, California.
