= Buffalo Prairie, Illinois =

- Census-designated place
- Location within Illinois Location within the United States
- Coordinates: 41°20′17″N 90°51′45″W
- Country: United States
- State: Illinois
- County: Rock Island

Area
  - Total: 3.76 sq mi (9.74 km^{2})
  - Land: 3.76 sq mi (9.74 km^{2})
  - Water: 0 sq mi (0.00 km^{2})
- Elevation: 755 ft (230 m)

Population (2020)
  - Total: 64
  - Density: 17.0/sq mi (6.57/km^{2})
- Time zone: UTC-6 (Central (CST))
  - Summer (DST): UTC-5 (CDT)
- ZIP code: 61237
- Area code: 309
- FIPS code: 17-09499
- GNIS feature ID: 2806462

Buffalo Prairie is a Census-designated place in Rock Island County, Illinois, United States. As of the 2020 census, Buffalo Prairie had a population of 64. Buffalo Prairie is 10 miles (16 km) west of Reynolds. Buffalo Prairie has a post office with ZIP code 61237.

== Demographics ==
Historical population
Census	Pop.	Note	%±
2020	64		—
U.S. Decennial Census

Buffalo Prairie first appeared as a census designated place in the 2020 U.S. census.

=== 2020 census ===
Buffalo Prairie CDP, Illinois – Racial and ethnic composition Note: the US Census treats Hispanic/Latino as an ethnic category. This table excludes Latinos from the racial categories and assigns them to a separate category. Hispanics/Latinos may be of any race.
Race / Ethnicity (NH = Non-Hispanic)	Pop 2020	% 2020
White alone (NH)	57	89.06%
Black or African American alone (NH)	0	0.00%
Native American or Alaska Native alone (NH)	0	0.00%
Asian alone (NH)	1	1.56%
Native Hawaiian or Pacific Islander alone (NH)	0	0.00%
Other race alone (NH)	0	0.00%
Mixed race or Multiracial (NH)	5	7.81%
Hispanic or Latino (any race)	1	1.56%
Total	64	100.00%

Buffalo Prairie had a population of 64 as of the 2020 United States Census.

== Education ==
It is in the Rockridge Community Unit School District 300.

== Notable people ==
- Margo Price, country singer and songwriter
