= Port Byron Township, Rock Island County, Illinois =

Coordinates: 41°37′41″N 90°20′07″W

Port Byron Township
- Township
- Location in Rock Island County

- Rock Island County's location in Illinois
- Country: United States
- State: Illinois
- County: Rock Island
- Established: November 4, 1856

Area
  - Total: 5 sq mi (13 km^{2})
  - Land: 3.55 sq mi (9.2 km^{2})
  - Water: 1.45 sq mi (3.8 km^{2}) 29.00%

Population (2010)
  - Estimate (2016): 1,428
  - Density: 407.3/sq mi (157.3/km^{2})
- Time zone: UTC-6 (CST)
  - Summer (DST): UTC-5 (CDT)
- FIPS code: 17-161-61236

Port Byron Township is located in Rock Island County, Illinois. As of the 2010 census, its population was 1,446 and it contained 704 housing units. Located on the Mississippi River, the major business is Sandstrum Industries with John Deere 15 minutes down state Hy 84 to the south. The John Deere corporate headquarters is in Moline 20 minutes south. Locally Port Byron has six bars and restaurants from fine dining to burgers and chili. Located 2 miles north of the Interstate 80 bridge over the Mississippi River on Illinois route 84, Port Byron is also on the Mississippi River Flyway for migrating birds. Thousands of species can be seen as they travel from Canada to the Gulf Coast espiecally the Pelicans in summer and the Eagles in winter.

== Geography ==
According to the 2010 census, the township has a total area of 5 square miles (13 km^{2}), of which 3.55 square miles (9.2 km^{2}) (or 71.00%) is land and 1.45 square miles (3.8 km^{2}) (or 29.00%) is water.

== Demographics ==
Historical population
Census	Pop.	Note	%±
2016 (est.)	1,428
U.S. Decennial Census
