= Drury Township, Rock Island County, Illinois =

Coordinates: 41°22′35″N 90°58′38″W

Drury Township
- Township
- Location in Rock Island County

- Rock Island County's location in Illinois
- Country: United States
- State: Illinois
- County: Rock Island
- Established: November 4, 1856

Area
  - Total: 53.53 sq mi (138.6 km^{2})
  - Land: 49.45 sq mi (128.1 km^{2})
  - Water: 4.08 sq mi (10.6 km^{2}) 7.62%

Population (2010)
  - Estimate (2016): 783
  - Density: 16.1/sq mi (6.2/km^{2})
- Time zone: UTC-6 (CST)
  - Summer (DST): UTC-5 (CDT)
- FIPS code: 17-161-20825
- Website: drurytownship.org

Drury Township is located in Rock Island County, Illinois. As of the 2010 census, its population was 797 and it contained 328 housing units.

Drury Township was so named on account of there being a large share of the first settlers with the last name Drury.

== Geography ==
According to the 2010 census, the township has a total area of 53.53 square miles (138.6 km^{2}), of which 49.45 square miles (128.1 km^{2}) (or 92.38%) is land and 4.08 square miles (10.6 km^{2}) (or 7.62%) is water.

== Demographics ==
Historical population
Census	Pop.	Note	%±
2016 (est.)	783
U.S. Decennial Census
