= Rural Township =

Rural Township may refer to:

== Taiwan ==
- Rural township (Taiwan) (Chinese: 鄉; pinyin: xiāng)

== United States ==
- Rural Township, Rock Island County, Illinois
- Rural Township, Shelby County, Illinois
- Rural Township, Jefferson County, Kansas
