= Moline Township, Rock Island County, Illinois =

Coordinates: 41°30′13″N 90°30′25″W

Moline Township
- Township
- Location in Rock Island County

- Rock Island County's location in Illinois
- Country: United States
- State: Illinois
- County: Rock Island
- Established: November 4, 1856

Area
  - Total: 7.71 sq mi (20.0 km^{2})
  - Land: 6.44 sq mi (16.7 km^{2})
  - Water: 1.27 sq mi (3.3 km^{2}) 16.47%

Population (2010)
  - Estimate (2016): 22,810
  - Density: 3,654.2/sq mi (1,410.9/km^{2})
- Time zone: UTC-6 (CST)
  - Summer (DST): UTC-5 (CDT)
- FIPS code: 17-161-49880
- Website: www.molinetownship.com

Moline Township is located in Rock Island County, Illinois, United States. At the 2010 census, its population was 23,529 and it contained 10,314 housing units.

== Geography ==
According to the 2010 census, the township has a total area of 7.71 square miles (20.0 km^{2}), of which 6.44 square miles (16.7 km^{2}) (or 83.53%) is land and 1.27 square miles (3.3 km^{2}) (or 16.47%) is water.

== Demographics ==
Historical population
Census	Pop.	Note	%±
2016 (est.)	22,810
U.S. Decennial Census
