= Cordova Township, Rock Island County, Illinois =

Coordinates: 41°42′54″N 90°16′59″W

Cordova Township
- Township
- Location in Rock Island County

- Rock Island County's location in Illinois
- Country: United States
- State: Illinois
- County: Rock Island
- Established: November 4, 1856

Area
  - Total: 27.07 sq mi (70.1 km^{2})
  - Land: 24.68 sq mi (63.9 km^{2})
  - Water: 2.39 sq mi (6.2 km^{2}) 8.83%

Population (2010)
  - Estimate (2016): 870
  - Density: 36.3/sq mi (14.0/km^{2})
- Time zone: UTC-6 (CST)
  - Summer (DST): UTC-5 (CDT)
- FIPS code: 17-161-16379
- Website: cordovatownship.com

Cordova Township is located in Rock Island County, Illinois. As of the 2010 census, its population was 896 and it contained 399 housing units.

== Geography ==
According to the 2010 census, the township has a total area of 27.07 square miles (70.1 km^{2}), of which 24.68 square miles (63.9 km^{2}) (or 91.17%) is land and 2.39 square miles (6.2 km^{2}) (or 8.83%) is water.

== Demographics ==
Historical population
Census	Pop.	Note	%±
2016 (est.)	870
U.S. Decennial Census
