= Cordova, Illinois =

Cordova
- Village
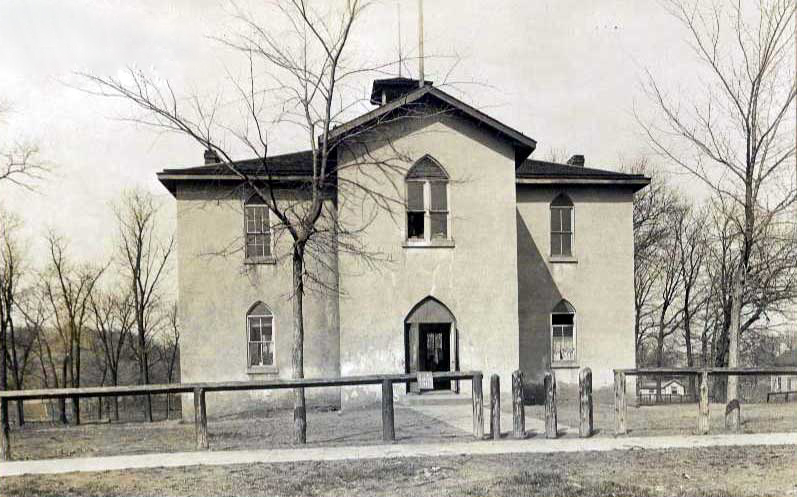
- Old Cordova School

- Location of Cordova in Rock Island County, Illinois.

- Location of Illinois in the United States
- Coordinates: 41°40′39″N 90°19′18″W
- Country: United States
- State: Illinois
- County: Rock Island

Area
  - Total: 0.58 sq mi (1.49 km^{2})
  - Land: 0.58 sq mi (1.49 km^{2})
  - Water: 0 sq mi (0.00 km^{2})
- Elevation: 659 ft (201 m)

Population (2020)
  - Total: 671
  - Density: 1,168.2/sq mi (451.04/km^{2})
- Time zone: UTC−6 (CST)
  - Summer (DST): UTC−5 (CDT)
- ZIP Code(s): 61242
- Area code: 309
- FIPS code: 17-16366
- GNIS feature ID: 2398626
- Website: villageofcordova.com

Cordova is a village in Rock Island County, Illinois, United States. Cordova population was 671 at the time of the 2020 census, down from 672 at the 2010 census.

== Geography ==
According to the 2010 census, Cordova has a total area of 0.6 square miles (1.55 km^{2}), all land.

=== Power plant ===
The city is home to one of three nuclear power plants in the west central Illinois area.

== Demographics ==
Historical population
Census	Pop.	Note	%±
1880	447		—
1890	443		−0.9%
1900	414		−6.5%
1910	324		−21.7%
1920	271		−16.4%
1930	271		0.0%
1940	364		34.3%
1950	475		30.5%
1960	502		5.7%
1970	589		17.3%
1980	697		18.3%
1990	638		−8.5%
2000	633		−0.8%
2010	672		6.2%
2020	671		−0.1%
U.S. Decennial Census

=== 2020 census ===
Cordova village, Illinois – Racial and ethnic composition Note: the US Census treats Hispanic/Latino as an ethnic category. This table excludes Latinos from the racial categories and assigns them to a separate category. Hispanics/Latinos may be of any race.
Race / Ethnicity (NH = Non-Hispanic)	Pop 2000	Pop 2010	Pop 2020	% 2000	% 2010	% 2020
White alone (NH)	604	641	622	95.42%	95.39%	92.70%
Black or African American alone (NH)	1	3	4	0.16%	0.45%	0.60%
Native American or Alaska Native alone (NH)	0	0	2	0.00%	0.00%	0.30%
Asian alone (NH)	1	5	0	0.16%	0.74%	0.00%
Native Hawaiian or Pacific Islander alone (NH)	2	0	0	0.32%	0.00%	0.00%
Other race alone (NH)	0	4	5	0.00%	0.60%	0.75%
Mixed race or Multiracial (NH)	9	7	16	1.42%	1.04%	2.38%
Hispanic or Latino (any race)	16	12	22	2.53%	1.79%	3.28%
Total	633	672	671	100.00%	100.00%	100.00%

=== 2000 census ===
As of the census of 2000, there were 633 people, 245 households, and 179 families residing in the village. The population density was 1,125.9 inhabitants per square mile (434.7/km^{2}). There were 266 housing units at an average density of 473.1 per square mile (182.7/km^{2}). The racial makeup of the village was 96.37% White, 0.16% African American, 0.16% Asian, 0.32% Pacific Islander, 1.58% from other races, and 1.42% from two or more races. Hispanic or Latino of any race were 2.53% of the population.

There were 245 households, out of which 31.4% had children under the age of 18 living with them, 62.9% were married couples living together, 4.9% had a female householder with no husband present, and 26.9% were non-families. 24.5% of all households were made up of individuals, and 13.1% had someone living alone who was 65 years of age or older. The average household size was 2.57 and the average family size was 3.00.

In the village, the age distribution of the population shows 25.9% under the age of 18, 6.5% from 18 to 24, 27.6% from 25 to 44, 25.9% from 45 to 64, and 14.1% who were 65 years of age or older. The median age was 40 years. For every 100 females, there were 104.9 males. For every 100 females age 18 and over, there were 98.7 males.

The median income for a household in the village was $50,000, and the median income for a family was $59,063. Males had a median income of $45,179 versus $25,000 for females. The per capita income for the village was $21,442. About 4.2% of families and 6.2% of the population were below the poverty line, including 1.4% of those under age 18 and 20.5% of those age 65 or over.

== Education ==
It is in the Riverdale Community Unit School District 100.

== Notable people ==
- Richard Morthland, former member of the Illinois House of Representatives.
- William Shew, former Speaker of the House in Wisconsin Territory's legislature
- Len Stockwell, outfielder for several teams
- Clyde H. Tavenner, served on the House of Representatives, Illinois's 14th congressional district
