= Rock Island Township, Rock Island County, Illinois =

Coordinates: 41°30′23″N 90°33′54″W

Rock Island Township
- Township
- Flag Logo

- Location in Rock Island County

- Rock Island County's location in Illinois
- Country: United States
- State: Illinois
- County: Rock Island
- Established: November 4, 1856

Government
  - Supervisor: Alan Carmen

Area
  - Total: 5.74 sq mi (14.9 km^{2})
  - Land: 4.84 sq mi (12.5 km^{2})
  - Water: 0.9 sq mi (2.3 km^{2}) 15.68%

Population (2010)
  - Estimate (2016): 17,435
  - Density: 3,670/sq mi (1,420/km^{2})
- Time zone: UTC-6 (CST)
  - Summer (DST): UTC-5 (CDT)
- FIPS code: 17-161-65091
- Website: www.rockislandtownshipil.gov

Rock Island Township is located in Rock Island County, Illinois. As of the 2010 census, its population was 17,776 and it contained 7,271 housing units.

== Geography ==
According to the 2010 census, the township has a total area of 5.74 square miles (14.9 km^{2}), of which 4.84 square miles (12.5 km^{2}) (or 84.32%) is land and 0.9 square miles (2.3 km^{2}) (or 15.68%) is water.

== Demographics ==
Historical population
Census	Pop.	Note	%±
2016 (est.)	17,435
U.S. Decennial Census
