= Bowling Township, Rock Island County, Illinois =

Coordinates: 41°22′22″N 90°36′32″W

Bowling Township
- Township
- Location in Rock Island County

- Rock Island County's location in Illinois
- Country: United States
- State: Illinois
- County: Rock Island
- Established: November 4, 1856

Area
  - Total: 36.87 sq mi (95.5 km^{2})
  - Land: 36.87 sq mi (95.5 km^{2})
  - Water: 0 sq mi (0 km^{2}) 0%

Population (2010)
  - Estimate (2016): 3,352
  - Density: 92.6/sq mi (35.8/km^{2})
- Time zone: UTC-6 (CST)
  - Summer (DST): UTC-5 (CDT)
- FIPS code: 17-161-07549

Bowling Township is located in Rock Island County, Illinois. As of the 2010 census, its population was 3,414 and it contained 1,455 housing units.

== Geography ==
According to the 2010 census, the township has a total area of 36.87 square miles (95.5 km^{2}), all land.

== Demographics ==
Historical population
Census	Pop.	Note	%±
2016 (est.)	3,352
U.S. Decennial Census
