= Buffalo Prairie Township, Rock Island County, Illinois =

Coordinates: 41°23′05″N 90°50′11″W

Buffalo Prairie Township
- Township
- Location in Rock Island County

- Rock Island County's location in Illinois
- Country: United States
- State: Illinois
- County: Rock Island
- Established: January 1858

Area
  - Total: 50 sq mi (130 km^{2})
  - Land: 46 sq mi (119 km^{2})
  - Water: 3.96 sq mi (10.3 km^{2}) 7.91%

Population (2010)
  - Estimate (2016): 811
  - Density: 17.9/sq mi (6.9/km^{2})
- Time zone: UTC-6 (CST)
  - Summer (DST): UTC-5 (CDT)
- FIPS code: 17-161-09512

Buffalo Prairie Township is located in Rock Island County, Illinois. As of the 2010 census, its population was 824 and it contained 359 housing units. Buffalo Prairie Township was originally named Buffalo Township, but changed its name to Copper Township October 1, 1857, and then from Copper to Buffalo Prairie.

== Geography ==
According to the 2010 census, the township has a total area of 50.09 square miles (129.7 km^{2}), of which 46.13 square miles (119.5 km^{2}) (or 92.09%) is land and 3.96 square miles (10.3 km^{2}) (or 7.91%) is water.

== Demographics ==
Historical population
Census	Pop.	Note	%±
2016 (est.)	811
U.S. Decennial Census
