= Cleveland, Illinois =

Cleveland
- Village
- Location of Cleveland in Henry County, Illinois.
- Coordinates: 41°30′06″N 90°19′07″W
- Country: United States
- State: Illinois
- County: Henry

Area
  - Village: 0.29 sq mi (0.76 km^{2})
  - Land: 0.29 sq mi (0.76 km^{2})
  - Water: 0 sq mi (0.00 km^{2})
- Elevation: 574 ft (175 m)

Population (2020)
  - Village: 163
  - Density: 555/sq mi (214.3/km^{2})
  - Metro: 381,050
- Time zone: UTC-6 (CST)
  - Summer (DST): UTC-5 (CDT)
- ZIP code: 61241
- Area code: 309
- FIPS code: 17-14923
- GNIS feature ID: 2397644

Cleveland is a village in Henry County, Illinois, United States. The population was 163 at the 2020 census.

== Geography ==
According to the 2021 census gazetteer files, Cleveland has a total area of 0.29 square miles (0.75 km^{2}), all land. The village sits along the Rock River.

== Demographics ==
Historical population
Census	Pop.	Note	%±
1880	303		—
1890	99		−67.3%
1940	127		—
1950	204		60.6%
1960	251		23.0%
1970	267		6.4%
1980	338		26.6%
1990	283		−16.3%
2000	253		−10.6%
2010	188		−25.7%
2020	163		−13.3%
U.S. Decennial Census

As of the 2020 census there were 163 people, 91 households, and 65 families residing in the village. The population density was 554.42 inhabitants per square mile (214.06/km^{2}). There were 71 housing units at an average density of 241.50 per square mile (93.24/km^{2}). The racial makeup of the village was 87.73% White, 0.61% African American, 0.61% Native American, 1.23% Asian, 0.00% Pacific Islander, 3.07% from other races, and 6.75% from two or more races. Hispanic or Latino of any race were 10.43% of the population.

There were 91 households, out of which 35.2% had children under the age of 18 living with them, 54.95% were married couples living together, 2.20% had a female householder with no husband present, and 28.57% were non-families. 25.27% of all households were made up of individuals, and 6.59% had someone living alone who was 65 years of age or older. The average household size was 2.86 and the average family size was 2.55.

The village's age distribution consisted of 22.0% under the age of 18, 7.8% from 18 to 24, 23.7% from 25 to 44, 33.7% from 45 to 64, and 12.9% who were 65 years of age or older. The median age was 43.3 years. For every 100 females, there were 129.7 males. For every 100 females age 18 and over, there were 118.1 males.

The median income for a household in the village was $54,250, and the median income for a family was $76,250. Males had a median income of $61,250 versus $40,357 for females. The per capita income for the village was $26,023. About 3.1% of families and 9.7% of the population were below the poverty line, including 8.7% of those under age 18 and 0.0% of those age 65 or over.

== Education ==
It is in the Geneseo Community Unit School District 228.
