= Canoe Creek Township, Rock Island County, Illinois =

Coordinates: 41°36′38″N 90°11′23″W

Canoe Creek Township
- Township
- Location in Rock Island County

- Rock Island County's location in Illinois
- Country: United States
- State: Illinois
- County: Rock Island
- Established: November 4, 1856

Area
  - Total: 14.93 sq mi (38.7 km^{2})
  - Land: 14.44 sq mi (37.4 km^{2})
  - Water: 0.49 sq mi (1.3 km^{2}) 3.28%

Population (2010)
  - Estimate (2016): 694
  - Density: 49.2/sq mi (19.0/km^{2})
- Time zone: UTC-6 (CST)
  - Summer (DST): UTC-5 (CDT)
- FIPS code: 17-161-10955

Canoe Creek Township is located in Rock Island County, Illinois. As of the 2010 census, its population was 711 and it contained 317 housing units.

== Geography ==
According to the 2010 census, the township has a total area of 14.93 square miles (38.7 km^{2}), of which 14.44 square miles (37.4 km^{2}) (or 96.72%) is land and 0.49 square miles (1.3 km^{2}) (or 3.28%) is water.

== Demographics ==
Historical population
Census	Pop.	Note	%±
2016 (est.)	694
U.S. Decennial Census
