= Portland Township, Whiteside County, Illinois =

Coordinates: 41°36′40″N 90°03′18″W

Portland Township
- Township
- Location in Whiteside County
- Country: United States
- State: Illinois
- County: Whiteside

Area
  - Total: 35.65 sq mi (92.3 km^{2})
  - Land: 34.73 sq mi (90.0 km^{2})
  - Water: 0.92 sq mi (2.4 km^{2}) 2.58%

Population (2010)
  - Estimate (2016): 409
  - Density: 12.2/sq mi (4.7/km^{2})
- Time zone: UTC-6 (CST)
  - Summer (DST): UTC-5 (CDT)
- FIPS code: 17-195-61262

Portland Township is located in Whiteside County, Illinois. As of the 2010 census, its population was 422 and it contained 186 housing units.

== Geography ==
According to the 2010 census, the township has a total area of 35.65 square miles (92.3 km^{2}), of which 34.73 square miles (90.0 km^{2}) (or 97.42%) is land and 0.92 square miles (2.4 km^{2}) (or 2.58%) is water.

== Demographics ==
Historical population
Census	Pop.	Note	%±
2016 (est.)	409
U.S. Decennial Census
