= Rock Island County, Illinois =

County in Illinois, United States

- County
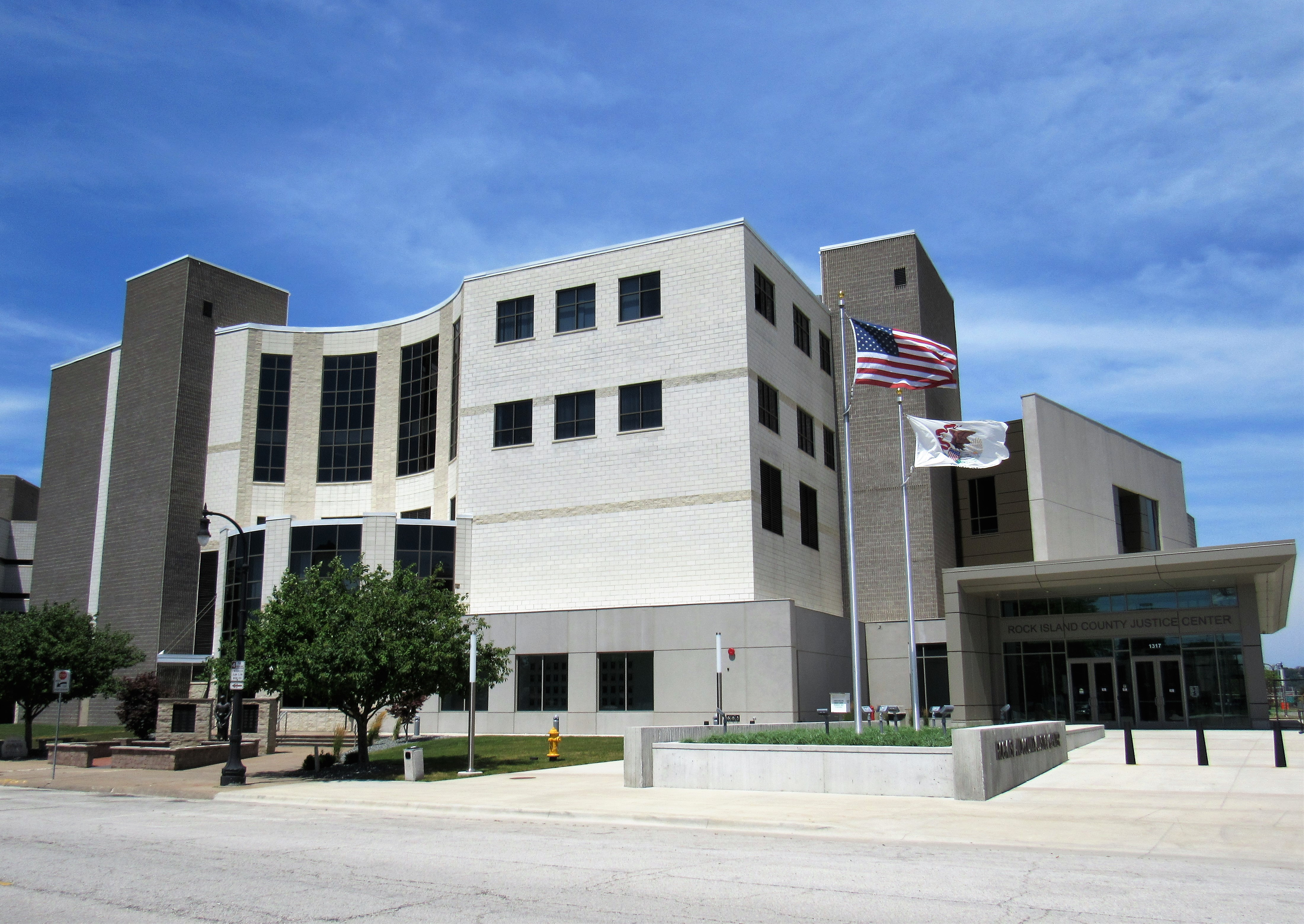
- Rock Island County Justice Center

- Logo

- Location within the U.S. state of Illinois
- Coordinates: 41°28′N 90°34′W
- Country: United States
- State: Illinois
- Founded: 1831
- Named for: Rock (Arsenal) Island
- Seat: Rock Island
- Largest city: Moline

Area
  - Total: 451 sq mi (1,170 km^{2})
  - Land: 428 sq mi (1,110 km^{2})
  - Water: 24 sq mi (62 km^{2}) 5.2%

Population (2020)
  - Total: 144,672
  - Estimate (2025): 141,869 ▼
  - Density: 338/sq mi (131/km^{2})
- Time zone: UTC−6 (Central)
  - Summer (DST): UTC−5 (CDT)
- Congressional district: 17th
- Website: rockislandcountyil.gov

Rock Island County is a county located in the U.S. state of Illinois, bounded on the west by the Mississippi River. According to the 2020 census, it had a population of 144,672. Its county seat is Rock Island; its largest city is neighboring Moline. Rock Island County is one of the four counties that make up the Davenport–Moline–Rock Island, IA–IL Metropolitan Statistical Area.

== History ==
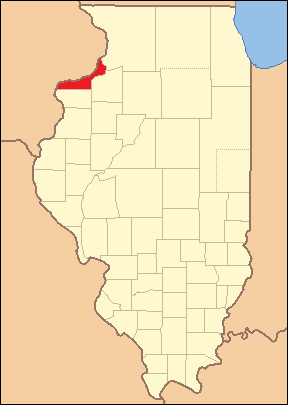
Rock Island County at the time of its creation in 1831

Rock Island County was formed in 1831 out of Jo Daviess County. It was named for Rock Island, an island in the Mississippi River now known as Arsenal Island. The Rock River (which the Sauk and Meskwaki peoples called Sinnissippi, meaning "rocky waters") flows from Whiteside County and points further east and north and joins the Mississippi River at Rock Island. The Sinnissippi Mounds, dating from the Hopewell period and on the National Register of Historic Places are upriver at Sterling in Whiteside County.

== Geography ==
According to the U.S. Census Bureau, the county has a total area of 451 square miles (1,170 km^{2}), of which 428 square miles (1,110 km^{2}) is land and 24 square miles (62 km^{2}) (5.2%) is water.

=== Climate and weather ===
Rock Island, Illinois

Climate chart (precipitation, max. and min. temperature)
J	F	M	A	M	J	J	A	S	O	N	D
1.3 30 13	1.4 36 19	2.6 48 29	3.6 61 41	4.4 72 52	4.8 81 63	3 85 68	4.3 83 66	2.9 76 57	2.4 65 45	2.5 48 32	1.9 35 20
- █ Average max. and min. temperatures in °F
- █ Precipitation totals in inches
- Source: The Weather Channel
Metric conversion
J	F	M	A	M	J	J	A	S	O	N	D
33 −1 −11	36 2 −7	66 9 −2	92 16 5	113 22 11	121 27 17	76 29 20	109 28 19	74 24 14	61 18 7	63 9 0	49 2 −7
- █ Average max. and min. temperatures in °C
- █ Precipitation totals in mm

In recent years, average temperatures in the county seat of Rock Island have ranged from a low of 13 °F (−11 °C) in January to a high of 85 °F (29 °C) in July, although a record low of −22 °F (−30 °C) was recorded in February 1996 and a record high of 103 °F (39 °C) was recorded in July 2006. Average monthly precipitation ranged from 1.28 inches (33 mm) in January to 4.75 inches (121 mm) in June.

=== Major highways ===
- Interstate 74
- Interstate 80
- Interstate 88
- Interstate 280
- U.S. Highway 6
- U.S. Highway 67
- U.S. Highway 150
- Illinois Route 2 (formerly)
- Illinois Route 5
- Illinois Route 84
- Illinois Route 92
- Illinois Route 94
- Illinois Route 110
- Illinois Route 192

=== Transit ===
- Quad Cities MetroLINK
- List of intercity bus stops in Illinois

=== Adjacent counties ===
- Clinton County, Iowa (north)
- Whiteside County (northeast)
- Henry County (southeast)
- Mercer County (south)
- Louisa County, Iowa (southwest)
- Muscatine County, Iowa (west)
- Scott County, Iowa (northwest)

=== National protected area ===
- Upper Mississippi River National Wildlife and Fish Refuge (part)

== Demographics ==
Historical population
Census	Pop.	Note	%±
1840	2,610		—
1850	6,937		165.8%
1860	21,005		202.8%
1870	29,783		41.8%
1880	38,302		28.6%
1890	41,917		9.4%
1900	55,249		31.8%
1910	70,404		27.4%
1920	92,297		31.1%
1930	98,191		6.4%
1940	113,323		15.4%
1950	133,558		17.9%
1960	150,991		13.1%
1970	166,734		10.4%
1980	165,968		−0.5%
1990	148,723		−10.4%
2000	149,374		0.4%
2010	147,546		−1.2%
2020	144,672		−1.9%
2025 (est.)	141,869	▼	−1.9%
U.S. Decennial Census; 1790-1960 1900-1990; 1990-2000 2010

=== 2020 census ===
As of the 2020 census, the county had a population of 144,672. The median age was 40.6 years. 22.1% of residents were under the age of 18 and 19.9% of residents were 65 years of age or older. For every 100 females there were 96.8 males, and for every 100 females age 18 and over there were 94.6 males age 18 and over.

The racial makeup of the county was 71.2% White, 11.5% Black or African American, 0.5% American Indian and Alaska Native, 2.8% Asian, <0.1% Native Hawaiian and Pacific Islander, 5.2% from some other race, and 8.8% from two or more races. Hispanic or Latino residents of any race comprised 13.7% of the population.

The 2020 census counted 88.5% of residents living in urban areas and 11.5% living in rural areas.

There were 60,735 households in the county, of which 27.4% had children under the age of 18 living in them. Of all households, 42.1% were married-couple households, 20.6% were households with a male householder and no spouse or partner present, and 30.0% were households with a female householder and no spouse or partner present. About 33.5% of all households were made up of individuals and 14.7% had someone living alone who was 65 years of age or older.

There were 66,729 housing units, of which 9.0% were vacant. Among occupied housing units, 66.4% were owner-occupied and 33.6% were renter-occupied. The homeowner vacancy rate was 2.1% and the rental vacancy rate was 10.7%.

=== Racial and ethnic composition ===
Rock Island County, Illinois – Racial and ethnic composition Note: the US Census treats Hispanic/Latino as an ethnic category. This table excludes Latinos from the racial categories and assigns them to a separate category. Hispanics/Latinos may be of any race.
Race / Ethnicity (NH = Non-Hispanic)	Pop 1980	Pop 1990	Pop 2000	Pop 2010	Pop 2020	% 1980	% 1990	% 2000	% 2010	% 2020
White alone (NH)	147,393	128,986	121,705	111,764	97,689	88.81%	86.73%	81.48%	75.75%	67.52%
Black or African American alone (NH)	9,710	10,290	11,099	12,911	16,169	5.85%	6.92%	7.43%	8.75%	11.18%
Native American or Alaska Native alone (NH)	257	301	288	283	240	0.15%	0.20%	0.19%	0.19%	0.17%
Asian alone (NH)	889	980	1,499	2,383	4,033	0.54%	0.66%	1.00%	1.62%	2.79%
Native Hawaiian or Pacific Islander alone (NH)	x	x	34	44	35	x	x	0.02%	0.03%	0.02%
Other race alone (NH)	510	82	109	135	482	0.31%	0.06%	0.07%	0.09%	0.33%
Mixed race or Multiracial (NH)	x	x	1,849	2,908	6,182	x	x	1.24%	1.97%	4.27%
Hispanic or Latino (any race)	7,209	8,084	12,791	17,118	19,842	4.34%	5.44%	8.56%	11.60%	13.72%
Total	165,968	148,723	149,374	147,546	144,672	100.00%	100.00%	100.00%	100.00%	100.00%

==== Racial / Ethnic Profile of places in Rock Island County, Illinois (2020 census) ====
Racial / Ethnic Profile of places in Rock Island County, Illinois (2020 Census)
Following is a table of towns and census designated places in Rock Island County, Illinois. Data for the United States (with and without Puerto Rico), the state of Illinois, and Rock Island County itself have been included for comparison purposes.
The majority racial/ethnic group is coded per the key below. Communities that extend into and adjacent county or counties are delineated with a ‡ followed by an accompanying explanatory note. The full population of each community has been tabulated including the population in adjacent counties.

Majority minority with no dominant group
Majority White
Majority Black
Majority Hispanic
Majority Asian

Racial and ethnic composition of places in Rock Island County, Illinois (2020 Census) (NH = Non-Hispanic) Note: the US Census treats Hispanic/Latino as an ethnic category. This table excludes Latinos from the racial categories and assigns them to a separate category. Hispanics/Latinos may be of any race.
Place	Designation	Total Population	White alone (NH)	%	Black or African American alone (NH)	%	Native American or Alaska Native alone (NH)	%	Asian alone (NH)	%	Pacific Islander alone (NH)	%	Other race alone (NH)	%	Mixed race or Multiracial (NH)	%	Hispanic or Latino (any race)	%
United States of America (50 states and D.C.)	x	331,449,281	191,697,647	57.84%	39,940,338	12.05%	2,251,699	0.68%	19,618,719	5.92%	622,018	0.19%	1,689,833	0.51%	13,548,983	4.09%	62,080,044	18.73%
United States of America (50 states, D.C., and Puerto Rico)	x	334,735,155	191,722,195	57.28%	39,944,624	11.93%	2,252,011	0.67%	19,621,465	5.86%	622,109	0.19%	1,692,341	0.51%	13,551,323	4.05%	65,329,087	19.52%
Illinois	State	12,812,508	7,472,751	58.32%	1,775,612	13.86%	16,561	0.13%	747,280	5.83%	2,959	0.02%	45,080	0.35%	414,855	3.24%	2,337,410	18.24%
Rock Island County	County	144,672	97,689	67.52%	16,169	11.18%	240	0.17%	4,033	2.79%	35	0.02%	482	0.33%	6,182	4.27%	19,842	13.72%
East Moline	City	21,374	11,643	54.47%	3,776	17.67%	29	0.14%	787	3.68%	0	0.00%	60	0.28%	816	3.82%	4,263	19.94%
Moline	City	42,985	28,038	65.23%	3,661	8.52%	75	0.17%	1,276	2.97%	13	0.03%	132	0.31%	1,759	4.09%	8,031	18.68%
Rock Island	City	37,108	21,910	59.04%	7,135	19.23%	63	0.17%	1,603	4.32%	12	0.03%	160	0.43%	1,928	5.20%	4,297	11.58%
Silvis	City	8,003	5,366	67.05%	731	9.13%	20	0.25%	174	2.17%	1	0.01%	25	0.31%	332	4.15%	1,354	16.92%
Andalusia	Village	1,184	1,099	92.82%	11	0.93%	5	0.42%	1	0.08%	0	0.00%	2	0.17%	30	2.53%	36	3.04%
Carbon Cliff	Village	1,846	1,204	65.22%	299	16.20%	6	0.33%	11	0.60%	2	0.11%	7	0.38%	92	4.98%	225	12.19%
Coal Valley ‡	Village	3,873	3,411	88.07%	35	0.90%	4	0.10%	30	0.77%	2	0.05%	8	0.21%	137	3.54%	246	6.35%
Cordova	Village	671	622	92.70%	4	0.60%	2	0.30%	0	0.00%	0	0.00%	5	0.75%	16	2.38%	22	3.28%
Hampton	Village	1,779	1,511	84.94%	25	1.41%	2	0.11%	5	0.28%	0	0.00%	13	0.73%	77	4.33%	146	8.21%
Hillsdale	Village	417	384	92.09%	1	0.24%	1	0.24%	0	0.00%	0	0.00%	2	0.48%	16	3.84%	13	3.12%
Milan	Village	5,097	4,130	81.03%	289	5.67%	13	0.26%	55	1.08%	2	0.04%	20	0.39%	273	5.36%	315	6.18%
Oak Grove	Village	476	414	86.97%	0	0.00%	0	0.00%	5	1.05%	1	0.21%	0	0.00%	22	4.62%	34	7.14%
Port Byron	Village	1,668	1,506	90.29%	10	0.60%	2	0.12%	7	0.42%	0	0.00%	10	0.60%	48	2.88%	85	5.10%
Rapids City	Village	964	889	92.22%	8	0.83%	1	0.10%	1	0.10%	0	0.00%	1	0.10%	27	2.80%	37	3.84%
Reynolds ‡	Village	498	467	93.78%	2	0.40%	0	0.00%	0	0.00%	0	0.00%	1	0.20%	20	4.02%	8	1.61%
Barstow	CDP	89	83	93.26%	0	0.00%	0	0.00%	0	0.00%	0	0.00%	1	1.12%	1	1.12%	4	4.49%
Buffalo Prairie	CDP	64	57	89.06%	0	0.00%	0	0.00%	1	1.56%	0	0.00%	0	0.00%	5	7.81%	1	1.56%
Campbell's Island	CDP	275	247	89.82%	1	0.36%	1	0.36%	0	0.00%	0	0.00%	0	0.00%	8	2.91%	18	6.55%
Coyne Center	CDP	877	784	89.40%	13	1.48%	0	0.00%	0	0.00%	0	0.00%	0	0.00%	53	6.04%	27	3.08%
Edgington	CDP	391	374	95.65%	1	0.26%	2	0.51%	0	0.00%	0	0.00%	0	0.00%	2	0.51%	12	3.07%
Illinois City	CDP	159	144	90.57%	0	0.00%	0	0.00%	0	0.00%	0	0.00%	0	0.00%	5	3.14%	10	6.29%
Joslin	CDP	85	81	95.29%	0	0.00%	0	0.00%	0	0.00%	0	0.00%	0	0.00%	3	3.53%	1	1.18%
Rock Island Arsenal	CDP	182	101	55.49%	24	13.19%	0	0.00%	9	4.95%	0	0.00%	6	3.30%	26	14.29%	16	8.79%
Taylor Ridge	CDP	141	127	90.07%	0	0.00%	1	0.71%	0	0.00%	0	0.00%	0	0.00%	8	5.67%	5	3.55%

=== 2010 census ===
As of the 2010 United States census, there were 147,546 people, 61,303 households, and 38,384 families residing in the county. The population density was 345.0 inhabitants per square mile (133.2/km^{2}). There were 65,756 housing units at an average density of 153.8 per square mile (59.4/km^{2}). The racial makeup of the county was 81.6% white, 9.0% black or African American, 1.6% Asian, 0.3% American Indian, 4.4% from other races, and 3.0% from two or more races. Those of Hispanic or Latino origin made up 11.6% of the population. In terms of ancestry, 25.9% were German, 14.2% were Irish, 8.7% were English, 6.8% were Swedish, and 5.2% were American.

Of the 61,303 households, 29.0% had children under the age of 18 living with them, 45.3% were married couples living together, 12.7% had a female householder with no husband present, 37.4% were non-families, and 31.6% of all households were made up of individuals. The average household size was 2.34 and the average family size was 2.93. The median age was 40.0 years.

The median income for a household in the county was $46,226 and the median income for a family was $58,962. Males had a median income of $42,548 versus $31,917 for females. The per capita income for the county was $25,071. About 8.7% of families and 12.3% of the population were below the poverty line, including 19.0% of those under age 18 and 7.1% of those age 65 or over.

== Economy ==
At one time Mississippi Valley Airlines had its headquarters in Quad City Airport in the county. John Deere is headquartered in Moline.

== Communities ==
=== Cities ===
- East Moline
- Moline
- Rock Island
- Silvis

=== Villages ===
- Andalusia
- Carbon Cliff
- Coal Valley (part)
- Cordova
- Hampton
- Hillsdale
- Milan
- Oak Grove
- Port Byron
- Rapids City
- Reynolds (part)

=== Census-designated places ===
- Barstow
- Buffalo Prairie
- Campbell's Island
- Coyne Center
- Edgington
- Illinois City
- Joslin
- Rock Island Arsenal
- Taylor Ridge

=== Townships ===
Rock Island County is divided into eighteen townships:

- Andalusia
- Blackhawk
- Bowling
- Buffalo Prairie
- Canoe Creek
- Coal Valley
- Coe
- Cordova
- Drury
- Edgington
- Hampton
- Moline
- Port Byron
- Rock Island
- Rural
- South Moline
- South Rock Island
- Zuma

=== Forts ===
- Fort Armstrong

== Politics ==
Before 1932, Rock Island County was a Republican stronghold in presidential elections, backing the party's candidate in every election from 1892 to 1928. From 1932 on, it has consistently backed Democratic Party presidential candidates, except for the national Republican landslides of 1952, 1956, 1972, and 1980. In 2016, Donald Trump managed to keep Hillary Clinton to a single-digit margin of victory, the first Republican to do so since Ronald Reagan in 1984; in 2020, Joe Biden increased the Democratic margin from 8.3% to 12.1%. Due to the dominance of the Democratic Party in county politics, Rock Island County remains one of the most Democratic counties outside of the Chicago area in Illinois. Since 2010 the Republican Party began making inroads in county politics, gaining a few seats on the Democratic-dominated county board; however, since 2018, the Republican Party influence on the board has begun to decrease as the county resumed heavy Democratic voting.

United States presidential election results for Rock Island County, Illinois
Year	Republican		Democratic		Third party(ies)	
Year	No.	%	No.	%	No.	%
1892	5,052	52.38%	4,034	41.82%	559	5.80%
1896	7,323	60.07%	4,692	38.49%	176	1.44%
1900	8,299	61.22%	4,786	35.31%	471	3.47%
1904	8,152	61.74%	2,156	16.33%	2,895	21.93%
1908	8,196	55.45%	4,739	32.06%	1,846	12.49%
1912	6,506	42.55%	3,997	26.14%	4,786	31.30%
1916	16,169	53.17%	10,914	35.89%	3,327	10.94%
1920	21,908	71.32%	5,208	16.95%	3,603	11.73%
1924	20,563	57.69%	3,631	10.19%	11,453	32.13%
1928	27,246	65.22%	14,334	34.31%	196	0.47%
1932	21,205	45.55%	24,676	53.01%	668	1.44%
1936	19,487	36.75%	32,741	61.74%	799	1.51%
1940	25,629	41.95%	35,240	57.67%	232	0.38%
1944	23,980	44.19%	30,102	55.48%	180	0.33%
1948	22,192	47.01%	24,542	51.98%	477	1.01%
1952	32,933	54.07%	27,879	45.77%	100	0.16%
1956	31,342	51.72%	29,145	48.09%	118	0.19%
1960	32,534	48.96%	33,812	50.88%	108	0.16%
1964	23,714	36.22%	41,759	63.78%	0	0.00%
1968	30,404	43.35%	34,506	49.20%	5,230	7.46%
1972	37,548	53.39%	32,529	46.25%	253	0.36%
1976	34,007	47.72%	35,994	50.51%	1,260	1.77%
1980	34,788	48.47%	30,045	41.86%	6,942	9.67%
1984	35,121	46.41%	40,208	53.13%	343	0.45%
1988	27,412	40.37%	40,174	59.17%	315	0.46%
1992	23,212	32.22%	37,412	51.93%	11,415	15.85%
1996	20,626	33.84%	34,822	57.13%	5,507	9.03%
2000	25,194	38.70%	37,957	58.31%	1,944	2.99%
2004	29,663	42.39%	39,880	56.99%	429	0.61%
2008	25,364	36.97%	42,210	61.52%	1,034	1.51%
2012	24,934	38.23%	39,157	60.04%	1,126	1.73%
2016	26,998	42.19%	32,298	50.47%	4,698	7.34%
2020	28,603	42.72%	36,691	54.81%	1,653	2.47%
2024	28,061	44.07%	34,126	53.59%	1,492	2.34%

== Education ==
K-12 school districts include:

- Erie Community Unit School District 1
- Mercer County School District 404
- Moline-Coal Valley School District 40
- Orion Community Unit School District 223
- Riverdale Community Unit School District 100
- Rock Island–Milan School District 41
- Rockridge Community Unit School District 300
- Sherrard Community Unit School District 200

There is one secondary school district: United Township High School District 30.

Elementary school districts include:

- Carbon Cliff-Barstow School District 36
- East Moline School District 37
- Hampton School District 29
- Silvis School District 34

== See also ==
- National Register of Historic Places listings in Rock Island County, Illinois
- Quad Cities International Airport
