= Area codes 309 and 861 =

Telephone area code serving West Central Illinois

Coordinates: 40°41′31″N 89°35′28″W

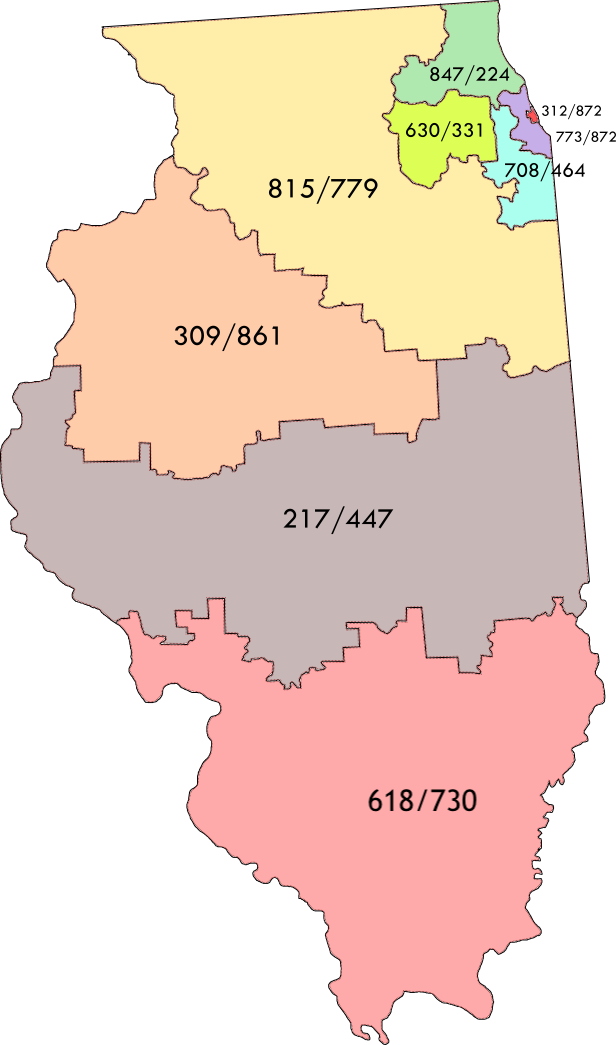
Area codes of Illinois

Area codes 309 and 861 are telephone area codes in the North American Numbering Plan (NANP) for the west-central part of the U.S. state of Illinois. The numbering plan area includes cities such as Bloomington, Canton, East Moline, East Peoria, Galesburg, Geneseo, Kewanee, Macomb, Minonk, Moline, Morton, Normal, Pekin, Peoria, Rock Island, Silvis, and many smaller communities in west-central Illinois. Area code 309 was created in 1957 in a split of area code 815. 861 was added to the numbering plan area on February 24, 2023, in formation of an overlay.

== History ==
When the American Telephone and Telegraph Company created the first nationwide telephone numbering plan for Operator Toll Dialing in 1947, the state of Illinois was divided into four numbering plan areas (NPAs), generally laid out as a southern, central, and northern area, and a region around the city of Chicago. The northern NPA was assigned area code 815 in the group of eighty-six original North American area codes.

Sometime after September 1956, the 815 numbering plan area was divided roughly in half along a north-westerly to south-easterly running line, assigning area code 309 to its western part. It was the only new area code created in Illinois between 1947 and the 1989 creation of area code 708.

On October 24, 2021, area code 309 was transitioned to ten-digit dialing, despite not being part of an overlay complex, in which multiple area codes are assigned to a numbering plan area. The area code had telephone numbers assigned for the central office code 988. In 2020, 988 was designated nationwide as a dialing code for the National Suicide Prevention Lifeline, which created a conflict for exchanges that still permitted seven-digit dialing.

NANPA exhaust projections for 309 in 2021 determined exhaustion for late 2023. For mitigation, a new all-services distributed overlay was announced with the new area code 861, which commenced operation on February 24, 2023. The earliest date central office codes could be requested was December 20, 2022, but assignments are available only after all central office codes in area code 309 have been allocated.

== Service area ==
Communities in the numbering plan area include:

- Abingdon
- Adair
- Albany
- Aledo
- Alexis
- Alpha
- Altona
- Anchor
- Andalusia
- Andover
- Annawan
- Armington
- Arrowsmith
- Astoria
- Atkinson
- Avon
- Bardolph
- Barstow
- Bartonville
- Bath
- Bellflower
- Benson
- Berwick
- Biggsville
- Bishop Hill
- Blandinsville
- Bloomington
- Bradford
- Brimfield
- Bryant
- Buda
- Buffalo Prairie
- Bushnell
- Cambridge
- Cameron
- Camp Grove
- Canton
- Carbon Cliff
- Carlock
- Carman
- Castleton
- Chillicothe
- Coal Valley
- Colchester
- Colfax
- Colona
- Congerville
- Cooksville
- Cordova
- Creve Coeur
- Cropsey
- Cuba
- Dahinda
- Danvers
- Deer Creek
- Delavan
- Downs
- Dumfermline
- Dunlap
- East Galesburg
- East Moline
- East Peoria
- Easton
- Edelstein
- Edwards
- El Paso
- Ellisville
- Ellsworth
- Elmwood
- Erie
- Eureka
- Fairview
- Farmer City
- Farmington
- Fenton
- Fiatt
- Forest City
- Galesburg
- Galva
- Geneseo
- Gerlaw
- Gilson
- Gladstone
- Glasford
- Good Hope
- Goodfield
- Green Valley
- Gridley
- Groveland
- Hampton
- Hanna City
- Havana
- Henderson
- Henry
- Heyworth
- Hillsdale
- Hopedale
- Hudson
- Illinois City
- Industry
- Ipava
- Joy
- Keithsburg
- Kewanee
- Kilbourne
- Kingston Mines
- Kirkwood
- Knoxville
- La Fayette
- La Rose
- Lacon
- Laura
- Le Roy
- Lewistown
- Lexington
- Little York
- Littleton
- Liverpool
- London Mills
- Low Point
- Lynn Center
- Mackinaw
- Macomb
- Manito
- Mapleton
- Maquon
- Marietta
- Matherville
- Mc Lean
- Media
- Merna
- Metamora
- Milan
- Mineral
- Minier
- Minonk
- Moline
- Monmouth
- Morton
- Mossville
- Neponset
- New Boston
- New Windsor
- Normal
- Norris
- North Henderson
- Oneida
- Oquawka
- Orion
- Osco
- Pekin
- Peoria
- Peoria Heights
- Plymouth
- Port Byron
- Prairie City
- Preemption
- Princeville
- Rapids City
- Raritan
- Reynolds
- Rio
- Roanoke
- Rock Island
- Rome
- Roseville
- St. Augustine
- St. David
- San Jose
- Saybrook
- Siota
- Seaton
- Secor
- Sherrard
- Shirley
- Silvis
- Smithfield
- Smithshire
- South Pekin
- Sparland
- Speer
- Stanford
- Stronghurst
- Table Grove
- Taylor Ridge
- Tennessee
- Topeka
- Toulon
- Towanda
- Tremont
- Trivoli
- Varna
- Vermont
- Victoria
- Viola
- Washburn
- Washington
- Wataga
- Williamsfield
- Woodhull
- Wyoming
- Yates City

== See also ==
- List of Illinois area codes
- List of North American Numbering Plan area codes

Illinois area codes: 217/447, 309/861, 312, 630/331, 618/730, 708/464, 773, 815/779, 847/224, 872
| | North: 563, 779/815 | |
| West: 319, 563 | 309/861 | East: 779/815 |
| | South: 217/447 | |
Iowa area codes: 319, 515, 563, 641, 712
