= Atkinson, Illinois =

Town in Henry County, Illinois, United States

Atkinson
- Town
- Location of Atkinson in Henry County, Illinois.

- Location of Illinois in the United States

- Location in Illinois Atkinson (the United States) Atkinson (North America)
- Coordinates: 41°24′46″N 90°00′08″W
- Country: United States
- State: Illinois
- County: Henry
- Incorporated: March 7, 1867

Area
  - Total: 1.95 sq mi (5.04 km^{2})
  - Land: 1.92 sq mi (4.97 km^{2})
  - Water: 0.023 sq mi (0.06 km^{2})
- Elevation: 650 ft (200 m)

Population (2020)
  - Total: 965
  - Density: 502.4/sq mi (193.99/km^{2})
- Time zone: UTC-6 (CST)
  - Summer (DST): UTC-5 (CDT)
- ZIP code: 61235
- Area code: 309
- FIPS code: 17-02726
- GNIS feature ID: 2397442
- Website: www.atkinsonil.org

Atkinson is a town in Henry County, Illinois, United States. The population was 965 at the 2020 census, down from 972 in 2010.

== Geography ==
According to the 2021 census gazetteer files, Atkinson has a total area of 1.95 square miles (5.05 km^{2}), of which 1.92 square miles (4.97 km^{2}) (or 98.77%) is land and 0.02 square miles (0.05 km^{2}) (or 1.23%) is water.

== Demographics ==
Historical population
| Census | Pop. | Note | %± |
|---|---|---|---|
| 1880 | 504 | | — |
| 1890 | 534 | | 6.0% |
| 1900 | 762 | | 42.7% |
| 1910 | 805 | | 5.6% |
| 1920 | 778 | | −3.4% |
| 1930 | 689 | | −11.4% |
| 1940 | 719 | | 4.4% |
| 1950 | 825 | | 14.7% |
| 1960 | 944 | | 14.4% |
| 1970 | 1,053 | | 11.5% |
| 1980 | 1,138 | | 8.1% |
| 1990 | 950 | | −16.5% |
| 2000 | 1,001 | | 5.4% |
| 2010 | 972 | | −2.9% |
| 2020 | 965 | | −0.7% |
U.S. Decennial Census

As of the 2020 census there were 965 people, 558 households, and 324 families residing in the town. The population density was 496.14 inhabitants per square mile (191.56/km^{2}). There were 463 housing units at an average density of 238.05 per square mile (91.91/km^{2}). The racial makeup of the town was 95.13% White, 0.31% African American, 0.00% Native American, 0.31% Asian, 0.00% Pacific Islander, 1.04% from other races, and 3.21% from two or more races. Hispanic or Latino of any race were 3.11% of the population.

There were 558 households, out of which 31.0% had children under the age of 18 living with them, 37.99% were married couples living together, 8.78% had a female householder with no husband present, and 41.94% were non-families. 31.90% of all households were made up of individuals, and 22.40% had someone living alone who was 65 years of age or older. The average household size was 3.12 and the average family size was 2.39.

The town's age distribution consisted of 26.0% under the age of 18, 9.1% from 18 to 24, 23.7% from 25 to 44, 21% from 45 to 64, and 20.1% who were 65 years of age or older. The median age was 38.8 years. For every 100 females, there were 74.5 males. For every 100 females age 18 and over, there were 82.3 males.

The median income for a household in the town was $47,833, and the median income for a family was $52,917. Males had a median income of $41,528 versus $30,882 for females. The per capita income for the town was $26,704. About 7.1% of families and 7.0% of the population were below the poverty line, including 2.9% of those under age 18 and 14.9% of those age 65 or over.

== Education ==
It in the Geneseo Community Unit School District 228.

== See also ==
- List of municipalities in Illinois
