= Zuma Township, Rock Island County, Illinois =

Zuma Township
- Township
- Location in Rock Island County

- Rock Island County's location in Illinois
- Coordinates: 41°33′N 90°16′W
- Country: United States
- State: Illinois
- County: Rock Island
- Established: October 1, 1857

Area
  - Total: 24.34 sq mi (63.0 km^{2})
  - Land: 23.77 sq mi (61.6 km^{2})
  - Water: 0.57 sq mi (1.5 km^{2}) 2.34%

Population (2010)
  - Estimate (2016): 746
  - Density: 31.8/sq mi (12.3/km^{2})
- Time zone: UTC-6 (CST)
  - Summer (DST): UTC-5 (CDT)
- FIPS code: 17-161-84246

Zuma Township is located in Rock Island County, Illinois. As of the 2010 census, its population was 757 and it contained 315 housing units. Zuma Township was originally named Walker Township, but was renamed on October 1, 1857.

== Geography ==
According to the 2010 census, the township has a total area of 24.34 square miles (63.0 km^{2}), of which 23.77 square miles (61.6 km^{2}) (or 97.66%) is land and 0.57 square miles (1.5 km^{2}) (or 2.34%) is water.

== Demographics ==
Historical population
Census	Pop.	Note	%±
2016 (est.)	746
U.S. Decennial Census
