= Edgington Township, Rock Island County, Illinois =

Coordinates: 41°22′33″N 90°43′34″W

Edgington Township
- Township
- Location in Rock Island County

- Rock Island County's location in Illinois
- Country: United States
- State: Illinois
- County: Rock Island
- Established: November 4, 1856

Area
  - Total: 35.69 sq mi (92.4 km^{2})
  - Land: 35.69 sq mi (92.4 km^{2})
  - Water: 0 sq mi (0 km^{2}) 0%

Population (2010)
  - Estimate (2016): 1,465
  - Density: 42.3/sq mi (16.3/km^{2})
- Time zone: UTC-6 (CST)
  - Summer (DST): UTC-5 (CDT)
- FIPS code: 17-161-22632

Edgington Township is located in Rock Island County, Illinois. As of the 2010 census, its population was 1,508 and it contained 643 housing units.

== Geography ==
According to the 2010 census, the township has a total area of 35.69 square miles (92.4 km^{2}), all land.

== Demographics ==
Historical population
Census	Pop.	Note	%±
2016 (est.)	1,465
U.S. Decennial Census

== History ==
The first three settlers built their log cabins in the summer of 1834. The village of Edgington began at "four corners" in the township, while the village of Taylor Ridge straddled the eastern border of the township at Bowling Township.
