= Rural Township, Rock Island County, Illinois =

Coordinates: 41°22′20″N 90°28′59″W

Rural Township
- Township
- Location in Rock Island County

- Rock Island County's location in Illinois
- Country: United States
- State: Illinois
- County: Rock Island
- Established: Unknown

Area
  - Total: 36.2 sq mi (94 km^{2})
  - Land: 36.2 sq mi (94 km^{2})
  - Water: 0 sq mi (0 km^{2})

Population (2010)
  - Estimate (2016): 972
  - Density: 27.3/sq mi (10.5/km^{2})
- Time zone: UTC-6 (CST)
  - Summer (DST): UTC-5 (CDT)
- FIPS code: 17-161-66300

Rural Township is located in Rock Island County, Illinois. As of the 2010 census, its population was 988 and it contained 389 housing units. The township, located south of Moline, Illinois, was formed from Coal Valley Township prior to 1839.

== History ==
Rural Township was formed out of Coal Valley Township prior to 1839. The first settlers of the region were Thomas and Davis Goodlow. The first schoolhouse was built in the township in 1846. In 1848, the nearest habitation was in Milan (then Camden Hills), and the nearest post office was in Rock Island.

== Geography ==
According to the 2010 census, the township has a total area of 36.2 square miles (94 km^{2}), all land.

== Demographics ==
Historical population
Census	Pop.	Note	%±
2016 (est.)	972
U.S. Decennial Census
