= Geneseo Community Unit School District 228 =

School district in Illinois, United States

Location
- 648 N Chicago St; Geneseo, IL 61254 United States

District information
- Grades: K-12
- Superintendent: Dr. Laura Delgado

Students and staff
- Students: 2,612

Other information
- Website: https://geneseoschools.org/

Geneseo Community Unit School District 228, also known as Geneseo Schools, is a public school district serving Geneseo, Illinois.

Entirely in Henry County, the district includes Geneseo, Atkinson, Cleveland, and pieces of Colona.

== Schools ==
Secondary schools

- Geneseo High School
- Geneseo Middle School

Elementary school

- Southwest
- Millikin
- Northside

Alternative programs

- Rock River Cooperative Alternative School (grades 6–12)
- ExCEL program (grades 6–12)
