= Moline, Illinois =

- City
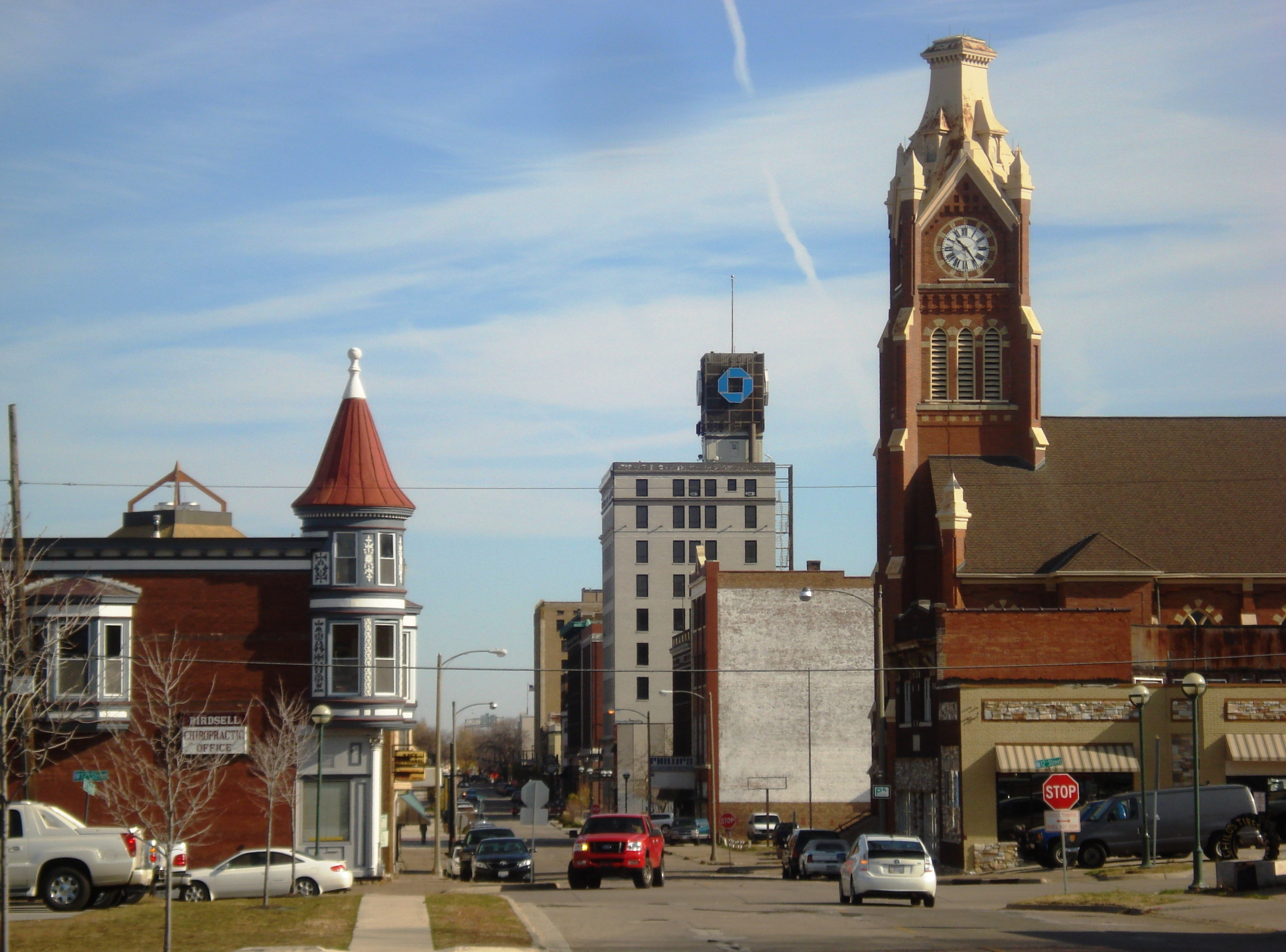
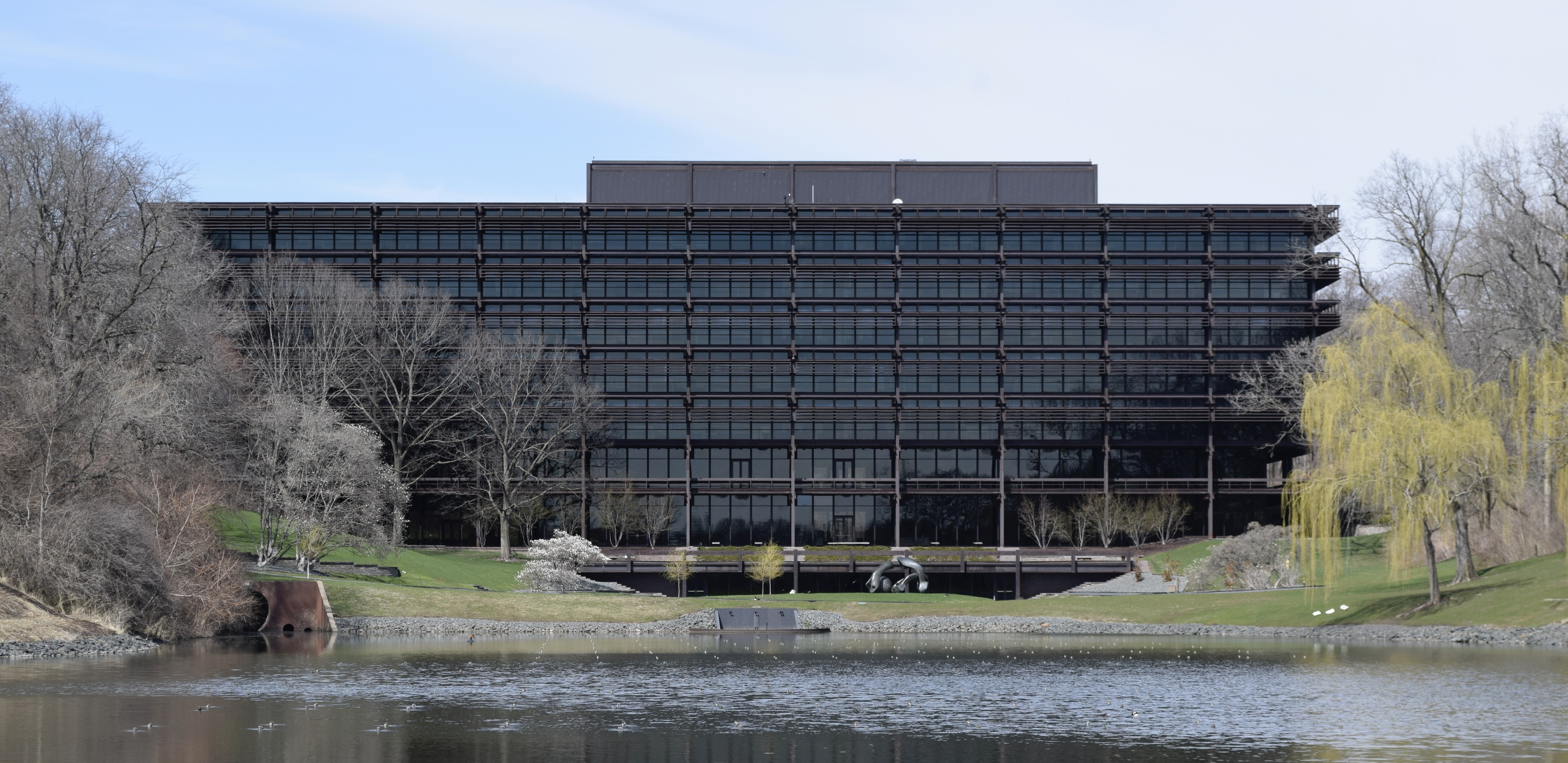
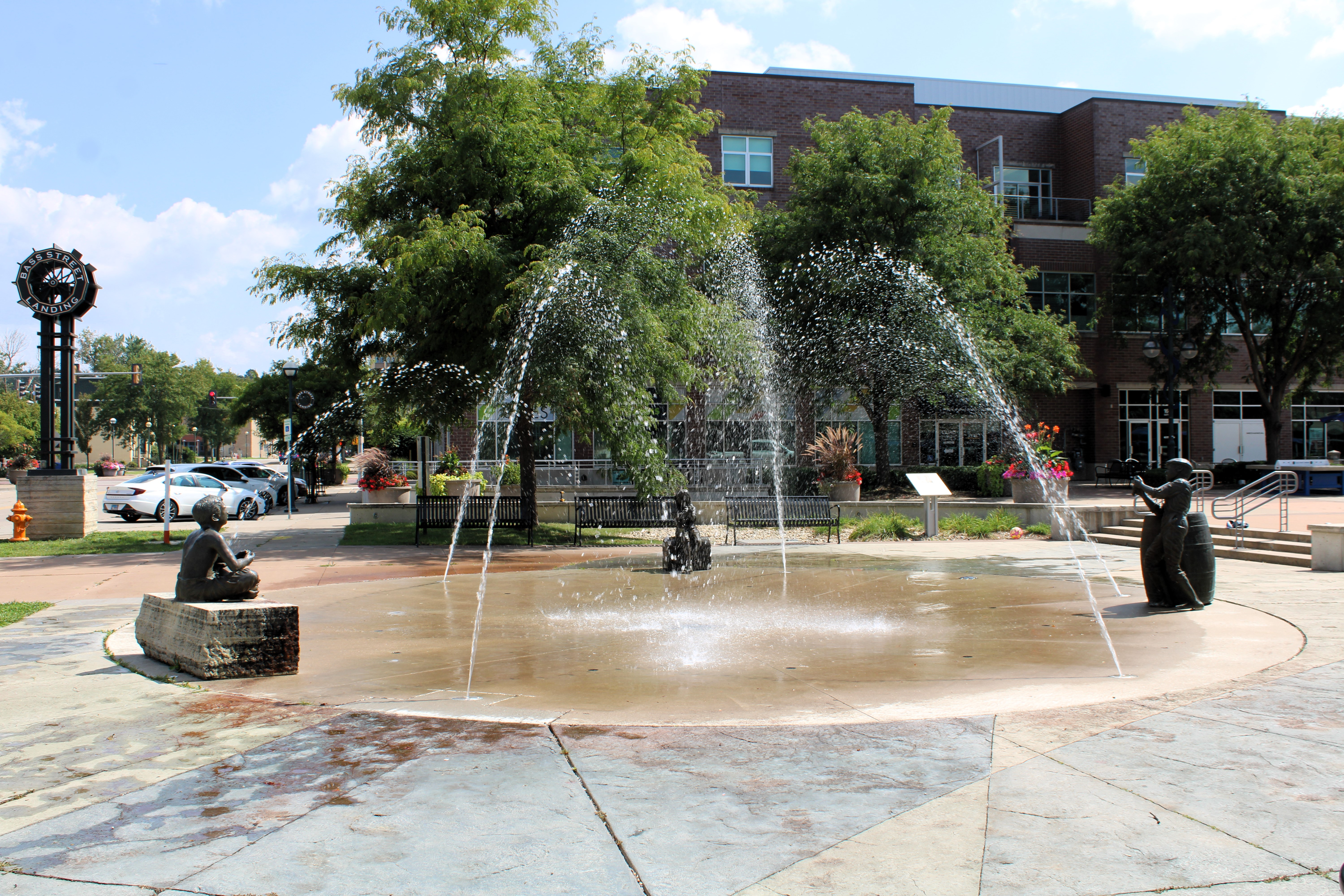
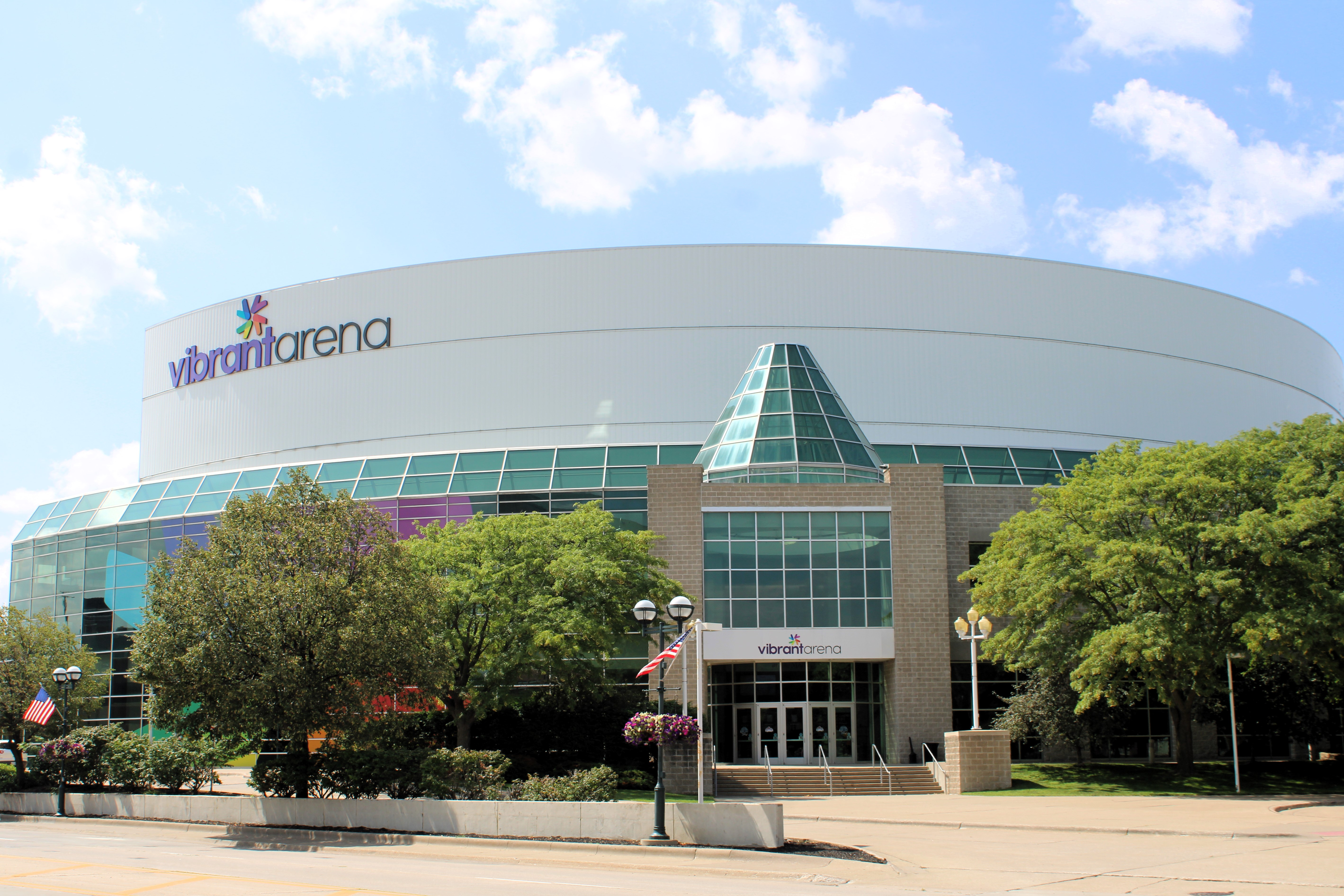
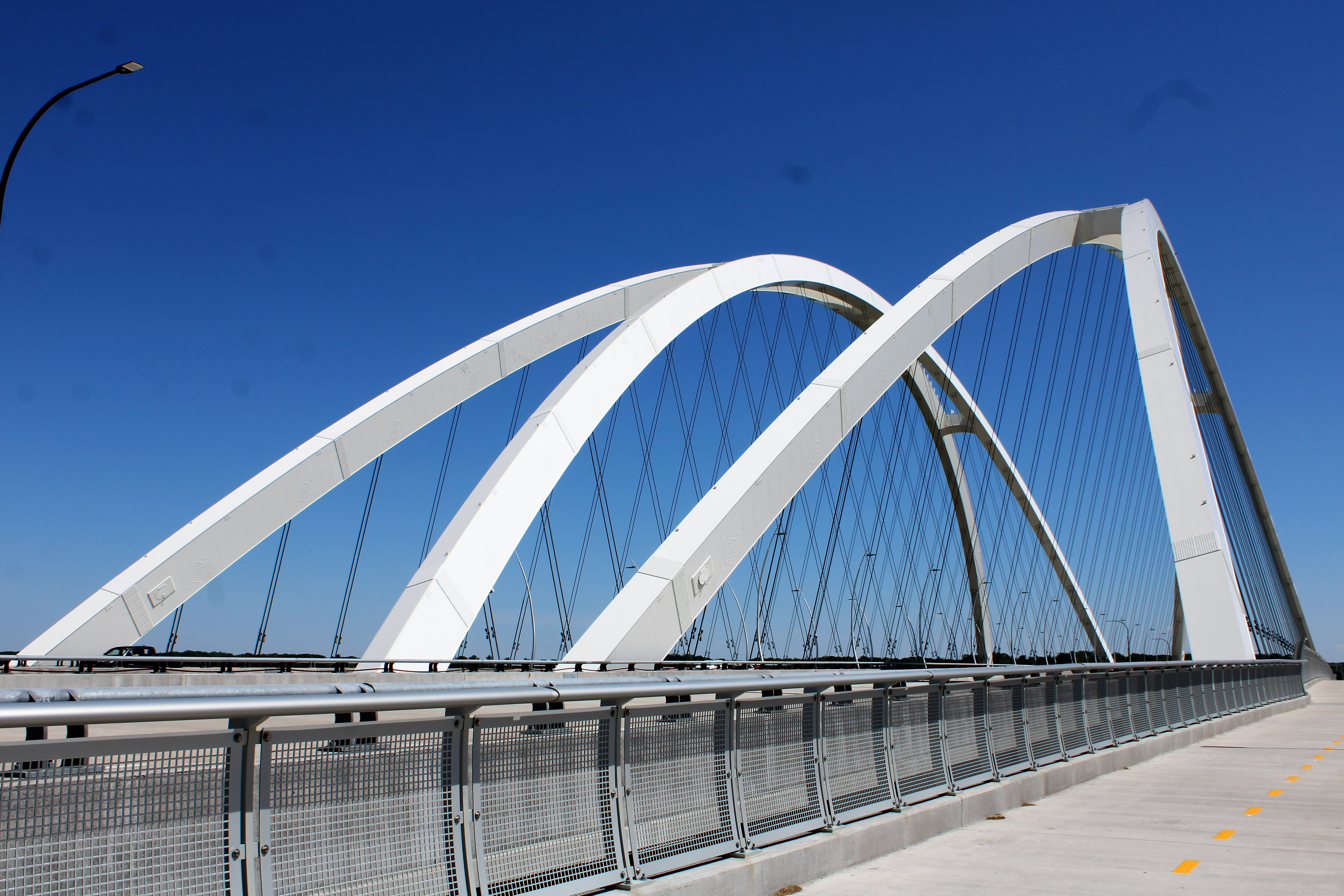
- Downtown Moline John Deere World Headquarters Bass Street Landing Vibrant Arena at The MARK Interstate 74 Bridge

- Flag Seal Logo
- Interactive map of Moline, Illinois
- Location within Illinois Location within the United States
- Coordinates: 41.4823°N 90.4934°W
- Country: United States
- State: Illinois
- County: Rock Island
- Founded: 1843
- Incorporated: April 21, 1848

Government
  - Type: Mayor–council
  - Mayor: Sangeetha Rayapati

Area
  - City: 16.935 sq mi (43.861 km^{2})
  - Land: 16.767 sq mi (43.427 km^{2})
  - Water: 0.168 sq mi (0.436 km^{2}) 0.99%
- Elevation: 633 ft (193 m)

Population (2020)
  - City: 42,985
  - Estimate (2025): 42,362
  - Rank: US: 980th IL: 36th
  - Density: 2,563.6/sq mi (989.82/km^{2})
  - Urban: 285,211 (US: 142nd)
  - Metro: 380,452 (US: 148th)
- Time zone: UTC−6 (Central (CST))
  - Summer (DST): UTC−5 (CDT)
- ZIP Codes: 61265, 61266
- Area codes: 309 and 861
- FIPS code: 17-49867
- GNIS feature ID: 2395365
- Website: moline.il.us

Moline (/moʊˈliːn/ moh-LEEN) is a city in Rock Island County, Illinois, United States. The population was 42,985 as of the 2020 census, and was estimated at 42,362 in 2025. It is the largest city in Rock Island County and the 36th-most populous in Illinois outside the Chicago metropolitan area. Moline is one of the Quad Cities at the confluence of the Rock and Mississippi rivers, along with neighboring East Moline and Rock Island in Illinois and the cities of Davenport and Bettendorf in Iowa. The Quad Cities metropolitan area had a population of approximately 380,452 as of 2025.

Moline was established in 1843. The name derives from the French moulin meaning "mill [town]". The corporate headquarters of Deere & Company is located in Moline, as was Montgomery Elevator; its acquirer Kone has its U.S. division headquartered in Moline. Quad Cities International Airport, Black Hawk College, and the Quad Cities campus of Western Illinois University-Quad Cities are located in Moline. It is a retail hub for the Illinois Quad Cities, as South Park Mall and numerous big-box shopping plazas are located in the city. Moline's downtown serves as one of the civic and recreational hubs of the region as many events take place at the 12,000-seat Vibrant Arena at The MARK and at John Deere Commons.

== History ==
=== Early history to 1848 ===
In 1837, David B. Sears and a group of associates built a 600-foot (180 m) stone-and-brush dam across Sylvan Slough, thereby connecting the southern bank of the Mississippi River to what is today called Arsenal Island. The dam not only served as an access road between the island's settlements and the mainland, but it provided water power for a mill which Sears built to saw wood, grind corn, and card wool. The water power generated by the dam attracted many industrialists. Over the next seven years, a number of factories sprouted up along the shoreline. A factory town was platted in 1843 on the Illinois shore under the working name of "Rock Island Mills". The name did not stick. When Charles Atkinson, one of the major landowners in the area, was offered the choice of naming the town Moline ("City of Mills", from the French moulin, as suggested by a local surveyor P.H. Olgilvie) or Hesperia (meaning "Star of the West"), he chose Moline. The town of Moline was incorporated on April 21, 1848, under Illinois state law and granted a charter for a trustee form of government.

The same year, John Deere, the inventor of the self-scouring steel plow, relocated his steel plow company from Grand Detour, Illinois, to Moline. At the time, Moline had a population of only a few hundred, mostly involved in work at the mill. Despite Moline's small size, Deere saw several promising elements there: Moline's dam and coal deposits would provide a good source of power; Moline was near the other well-established towns of Stephenson (later renamed Rock Island) in Illinois and Davenport in Iowa; and Moline's access to the river would make shipping goods cost-efficient. As Deere expanded his factories, Moline grew in area and population.

Charles Atkinson and others successfully lobbied the federal government to get the first transcontinental railroad to pass through Moline and to cross the Mississippi over Arsenal Island. The railroad, which arrived in 1854, carried thousands of immigrants – at that time mostly Swedish, Belgian, and German, reflecting areas of economic problems in Europe – to Moline's borders. The immigrants, most of whom knew little or no English, responded to the call of "John Deere Town" by the conductor. The railroad connected the region to the national economy, ending its previous isolation, and ensured the future success of the area. Manufactured goods were increasingly transported over rail instead of by water.

Moline's founding fathers were primarily ambitious industrialists from New England. David B. Sears came to Moline from the Northeast by way of Cairo, Illinois, and Atkinson, John W. Spencer, and Spencer H. White, other prominent founding men, were also New Englanders. They brought a stern work ethic and controlled civic life; Moline, in contrast to its neighbors, was not a "shoot 'em up river-town". An article in the Moline Workman in 1854 noted that a "much duller town could not be scared up this side of Sleepy Hollow". Moline attracted large waves of immigrants from Sweden, who were believed to be family-minded, God-fearing, community-oriented workers who rarely went on strike.

Following incorporation, Moline was laid out in an orderly initial grid of sixteen square blocks with streets named after the primary landowners of the time. The New Englanders chose not to install a town common or park along the river, as they thought the space would be better used for industrial purposes. Many of these founders clearly envisioned a "Lowell on the Mississippi", after a major industrial city of Massachusetts; Moline was marketed as a "Lowell of the West" to potential investors and immigrants.

As Moline grew around its mills and factories, and as its neighbor to the west, Rock Island, continued to grow at a similar pace, the neighboring towns ran up against one another's borders relatively quickly. In the mid-19th century, articles about "consolidation" were a daily feature in the Moline Workman and the Rock Island Advertiser; city leaders dreamed of the joint city becoming the largest in the state. As local leaders sat down to discuss consolidation, however, disputes arose, with the most important being which city would subsume the other. As the county seat and earliest settlement on the Illinois side, Rock Island argued that it should annex Moline; Moline, being more prosperous and better known nationally, wanted to keep its name. Other points of conflict included that Moline did not want to have to assume any of Rock Island's public debt; Rock Island feared that a union with Moline would drive down its property values; and the citizens of the two towns, representing different regions, classes, occupations and ethnicities, widely disagreed on major political issues of the day. Many leaders of Rock Island, a community founded largely by Southerners, remained sympathetic to the Confederate cause throughout the Civil War. Meanwhile, Moline was ardently Republican. The talks of consolidation ceased, although they would later return but were never resolved in favor of the merger.

=== 1860s–1940s ===
After the Civil War, the population of Moline continued to grow. The street grid was expanded to the east and west along the shoreline and to the south up the bluffs. There was a severe housing shortage; few men were rich enough to invest in real estate other than what they could afford to build for themselves, and few incoming workers had sufficient funds to build a home. Nevertheless, Moline's expansion was generally an orderly affair. The street grid remained a set of rectangular blocks, and though no zoning commission or local authority directly oversaw construction, the unwritten code of carpenters, masons, and citizens kept the city a well-planned place. Temperance societies and lyceums joined other reform movements and social organizations in prominence within the community. The quality of life was generally regarded as quite good: "The laboring men of Moline are among the most prosperous to be found in the country. Instead of spending their spare earnings in saloons and dram shops, they carefully hoard them and in a few years a little home of their own is the result."

Over time, John Deere expanded operations into other agricultural equipment, and Deere-affiliated factories employed the bulk of Moline's workforce. Soon other Moline-based companies became known around the country for their products. These include Dimock, Gould, and Co., Moline Pipe Organ Co., and Moline Furniture Works, to name a few. In addition, several pioneering automobile companies operated in the city, among them Moline Automobile Company, Moline Wagon Company, Stephens (a marque of the Moline Plow Company) and Velie Motors Corporation.

During the last few decades of the 19th century, Moline had continued prosperity, expansion of the city to the southwest, west, and east along the Mississippi river, and a stronger relationship with neighboring communities. Consolidation talks began again with Rock Island but failed as the two cities quarreled over which would acquire the other. By 1880, Moline had 7,800 residents, and by 1890 there were 12,000. Rock Island kept pace with 8,500 and 13,000 people respectively. New jobs were created primarily in Moline in this era.

Several improvements in construction and urban planning led to a shift in urban growth strategies in Moline. The first buildings were equipped with heat in September 1897, and electricity first arrived in Moline in 1881 when John Deere & Co. installed sixteen electric streetlights on the roadway outside its factories. Work on an electric streetcar system soon followed, and within the same decade, an intercity streetcar system linked Moline with Rock Island and Davenport. The diminishing reliance on well water or the river allowed home construction to proceed further up the bluff, and the electric streetcars allowed Tri-Citians to live in one community and shop or work in another. Moline's streetcar system, the state's first and only the nation's third, was also Illinois's best for a number of years, with a minimal five-cent fare and an extensive coverage area. The state's first garbage collection system was also developed in Moline in 1894. In this time, the municipal administration bureaucracy first began to grow, with departments created for sanitation, public works, utilities, and recreation. New public buildings also were constructed; the first public library came in 1873, the YMCA was built in 1885, and Moline Public Hospital opened in 1896.

In the midst of steady growth and changing times, the town's founders struggled to maintain their positions of authority. Moline was re-chartered as a city under a mayor/aldermanic form of government on April 21, 1872, and John Deere, the longtime resident and entrepreneur, was defeated by Daniel Wheelock, a newcomer, for the first mayorship. Belgian and Swedish immigrants began arriving in a huge influx, settling into a neighborhood on the bluffs in the southwestern part of the city. Belgian immigrants came predominantly to work in the fledgling auto industry in Moline, Velie Motors, founded by a Deere relative. For a time, Moline had the second largest Belgian population in the country after Detroit. Swedish immigrants continued to be drawn to Deere & Company, with John Deere as leader continuing to hire new employees in droves until his death in 1886.

In 1883 a major overhaul of Moline's urban grid was undertaken. Several roads were removed or re-routed in the interest of creating an aesthetically pleasing downtown and a more orderly method of horse and streetcar transit. The model of Lowell was abandoned in favor of that of Pittsburgh, a great river town with a strong urban center. Retail and commerce was encouraged in downtown Moline, and higher density housing began to appear there. The historic street names were replaced by a numerical system in which north–south roads were dubbed "streets" and east–west ones were re-christened "avenues". Though some complained "the corner of Ann Street and Bass Street… is now merely 17th Street at 6th Avenue", the new system, inspired by an alderman's visit to Philadelphia in 1876 for the Centennial, was generally regarded as a great urban innovation.

Moline was a successful, if somewhat boring, turn-of-the-20th-century city. It was clean, well maintained, and prosperous, and unlike Rock Island and Davenport, contained no slums, congestion, or red-light districts. Despite the occasional conflicts between native-born and immigrant leaders, the Puritanical, serious temperament of the city had not changed in the half-century since Moline's founding. The city became known as "Proud Moline" to its neighbors, a somewhat derisive nickname that touched on Moliners' sometimes haughty, holier-than-thou attitude. The electric streetcar system expanded as the city did, and by 1915 there were over 45 miles (72 km) of paved city streets and 75 miles (121 km) of sidewalks. Recognizing a need for more recreational space, Riverside Park was established in 1902 near present-day 34th Street on the waterfront, and the Tri-City Railway Company opened Prospect Park in the southern part of the city in 1911 as an amusement park. The widespread prosperity attracted wave upon wave of immigrants, and Moline's immigrant workers often sent for their extended families in the Old Country to join them in America. The 1910 census showed the Tri-Cities metro area to have the second highest per-capita income in the United States.

By the 1920s and 1930s, the appearance of East Moline in Illinois and Bettendorf in Iowa reflected the further growth and diversification of the region. Moline emerged as a retail, transportation, and cultural hub on the Illinois side of the river. The first metropolitan airfield, the Moline Airport, opened in 1926 and later provided commercial air service to Chicago and St. Louis. With federal funds from the Works Progress Administration, the Iowa-Illinois Memorial Bridge, a single-span, two-lane highway bridge built for automotive traffic, was concluded between Moline and Davenport in 1935 and quickly became the preferred method for interstate transit. A bustling retail sector emerged in downtown Moline, anchored by merchants like the New York Store, Sears & Roebuck, and JC Penney. The economic reliance on the farm implement industry continued as Deere & Company emerged to become the largest agricultural machinery company in the world. Colonel Charles Deere Wiman, the President of Deere & Company, re-affirmed Deere's commitment to the Quad-Cities region by building several new factories in Moline, East Moline, Silvis, and Milan in Illinois and Davenport in Iowa.

=== 1940s–1980s ===
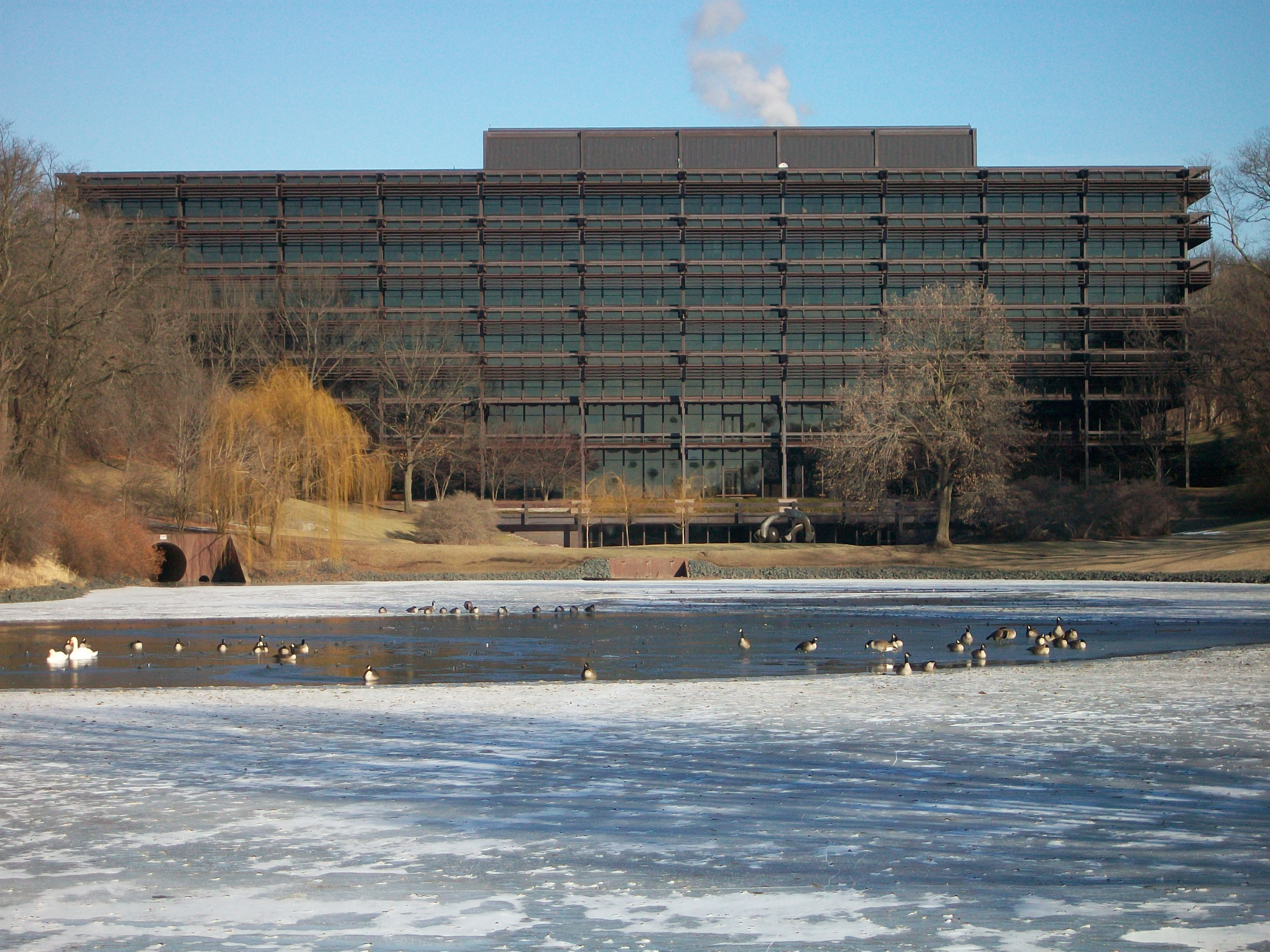
Deere & Company World Headquarters in Moline

Moline witnessed a continued population increase after World War II with the completion of "Molette", a subdivision of mass-produced starter homes selling for $5,000 each. Molette was the first Moline neighborhood produced on a mass scale and one of the largest single-unit housing projects in the Midwest at the time. Near Molette on 41st Street, the Defense Department funded an $800,000 housing project known as Springbrook Courts, which served as housing for Rock Island Arsenal employees before being converted into a non-military-affiliated public housing project managed by the Moline Housing Authority. It was in this time that one of the major factors shaping the modern layout of Moline first came into play—the rough topography of the inland bluffs. As Moline grew, the traditional rectilinear grid of the downtown area gave way to smaller subdivisions containing cul-de-sacs, curvilinear roadways, and courts. As a comprehensive plan of Moline later stated, "the topography has had a decided influence upon the growth and development of the city . . . the city is literally interlaced with fingers of wooded ravines draining surface water to the north into the Mississippi and to the south into the creeks and drainage ditches tributary to the Rock River. This condition has greatly influenced the building of underground utilities, the location of thoroughfares, the selection of sites for schools and parks, the design and development of residential areas, and the location of business and industrial areas. The customary 'grid' type subdivision planning so common to most Midwestern cities is impractical of adaptation when looking at a map of the present city. Some streets . . . have been dedicated but never improved because of the topography and the excessive cost of construction."

The layout of the city was significantly improved by the approval of the city's first zoning ordinance and the creation of a Zoning Board in 1929. Moline became the first Illinois city outside the Chicago area to adopt this tool of urban planning. The zoning board, in its preliminary report, released the following statement: "Generally speaking, [the new zoning ordinance] will tend to promote public health, safety, comfort, morals, and welfare. Specifically, it is designed to lessen congestion in streets and to avoid future congestion; to secure safety from fire and other hazards; to provide light and air about buildings in which people live; to prevent overcrowding of land and avoid excessive concentration of population; to assist in adequately providing transportation, water supply, sewage disposal, schools, parks, and other public requirements.

Although the city did not suffer during the 1950s and 1960s, those decades marked a departure from the city's earlier trajectory of unceasing upward growth. The zoning ordinance drawn up in 1929 predicted a population of 70,000–80,000 for Moline in 1980, but Moline actually only attained 45,000 by that year. The primary problem for Moline, and the Quad-Cities at large, in this period was the area's lack of a strong national identity. The Moline Association of Commerce marketed the Quad-Cities under the motto of "Joined together, as the boroughs of New York City" throughout the 1940s and 1950s, with Moline as the "nucleus", but few corporations bought into the analogy. Despite the Quad-Cities' status as "the largest metropolitan area between Chicago, Omaha, Minneapolis, St. Louis, and Kansas City", the area remained relatively unheard of. Existing companies, including John Deere, Alcoa, Caterpillar, Case, and International Harvester all continued to grow and expand operations in the area, but no real diversification of local industry occurred; Moline remained steadfastly dependent on the farm implement industry for its economic solvency, a dependency that later proved disastrous.

In 1989, a region-wide comprehensive plan called "Quad-City Visions for the Future" summed up the area's problems well. "Growth has been so that the Quad-Cities population is split almost equally between the two states. This is an unusual growth pattern on major rivers that form state boundaries. Further complicating the economic and political arenas is the fact that there are five contiguous cities in the Iowa Quad-Cities and eight in the Illinois Quad-Cities. Quad-Cities fragmentation historically has been raised as a major community liability by many different groups and individuals. It is difficult for outsiders to appreciate the opportunities available here; growth and development are more difficult because of the differences in regulations; the distribution of grant money from state and federal governments has not always been efficient or effective; governmental services are more costly when administered by many entities separately."

As a result of the gradual dissolution of the trends of industrial expansion and the end of the age of immigration, Moline's population stagnated throughout the mid-to-late-20th century, settling in the 40,000–45,000 range, where it remains today. The central retail district gradually closed down as the area's first shopping malls opened in the early 1970s, pulling business away from downtown. This southward trend in retail occurred despite the extension of Interstate 74 through the city and across the river on the Iowa-Illinois Memorial Bridge in 1974, an infrastructure improvement that made Moline's downtown more accessible and brought thousands of commuters and travelers through Moline each day. Though most civic leaders and journalists had been optimistic-one reporter claimed "almost every indicator of economic, population, and civic growth points to the fact that Moline's potential for growth is greater than ever especially in its now readily accessible downtown" – there was no stopping the dawn of the age of strip retailing.

Perhaps the greatest problem befalling Moline in the second half of the 20th century was the farm crisis of the 1980s. Moline's economic vitality was sapped as the agricultural crisis crippled the farm implement industry, the force which had shaped the development of Moline since the city's earliest days. Plant after plant laid off workers by the thousands, and unemployment in the area soared to twice the national average. Even Deere & Company moved most of its factory operations out of Moline, though it maintained its world headquarters in Moline in a specially commissioned building that was designed by Eero Saarinen. The LeClaire Hotel, the tallest building in Moline and a longtime symbol of the city's wealth and prestige, closed its doors. The 1990 census showed a population loss for the city for the second straight decade.

=== 1990s–2000s ===
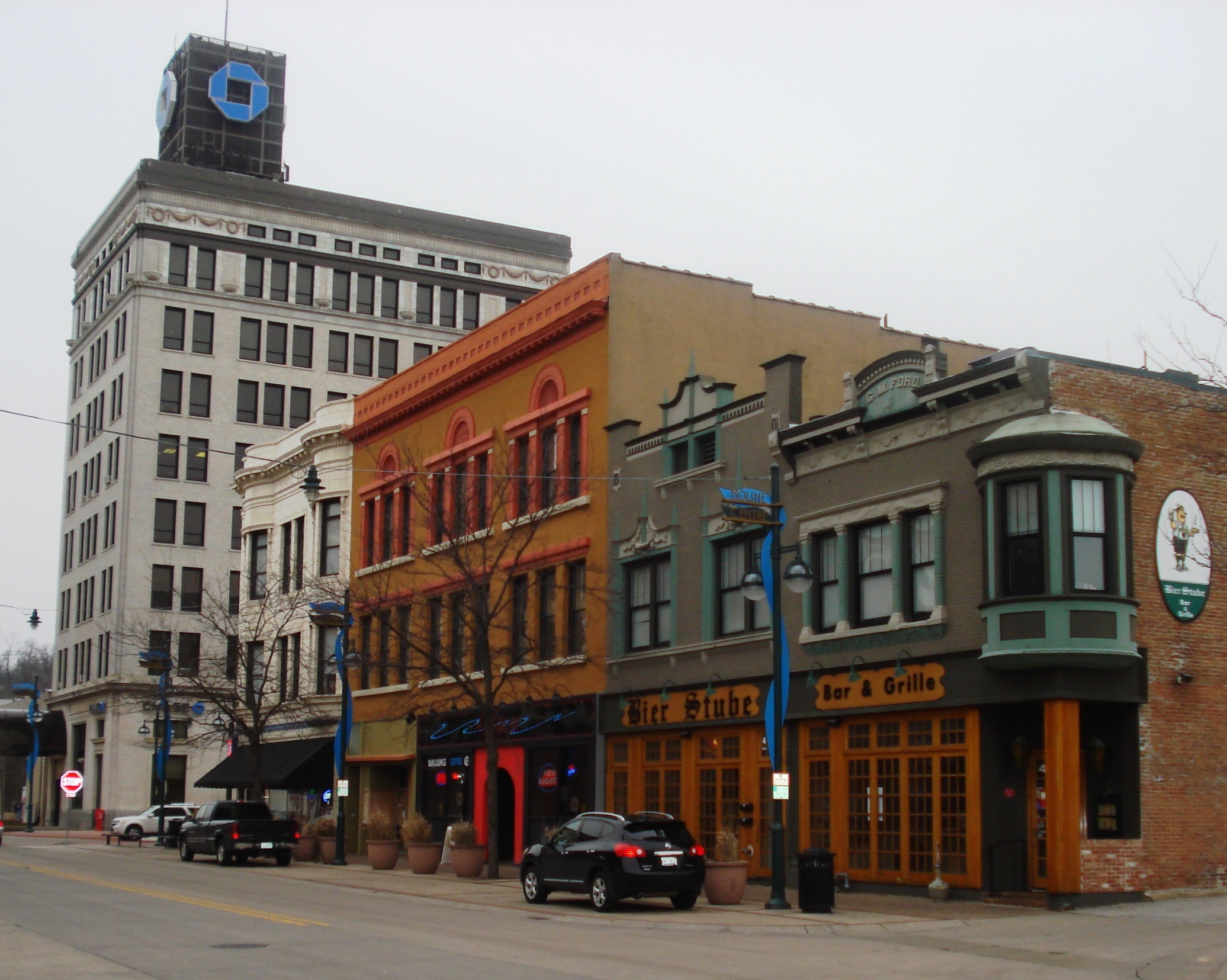
15th Street, Moline Downtown Commercial Historic District

In the 1990s, Moline began staging a comeback through the redevelopment of its riverfront. Deere & Company demolished its vacant riverfront factories and donated the land to the city so that it could build a civic center on the space. The Mark of the Quad-Cities, now known as the Vibrant Arena at The MARK, was completed in 1993 and is now the home to large conventions, concerts, high school sports tournaments, and a host of other events. The Quad City Steamwheelers, an arena football team, played their af2 home games at the arena from 2000 to 2009 when the league ceased operations. It has also been home to several minor league hockey teams including both the original Quad City Mallards and a newer Quad City Mallards, the Quad City Flames, and the Quad City Storm. In the late 1990s, John Deere Commons was built, a multimillion-dollar entertainment and tourism complex containing a hotel, restaurants, offices, a John Deere Collector's Center (located in a re-created 1950s John Deere dealership), the John Deere Store, and the John Deere Pavilion, a tourist center showcasing the history of agriculture in the Midwest. The Commons attracts 400,000 visitors a year, injecting a tremendous boost to the downtown economy. Renovations have been completed on many old brownstone buildings, and plans for shoreline mixed-use condominium and retail developments are in the works on the site of vacant industrial land.

Moline still reflects the rich culture of the successive waves of immigrants from France, Germany, Sweden, Belgium, Eastern Europe, and most recently, Mexico. Events such as the annual Greek Cultural Festival at John Deere Commons, Rolle Bolle tournaments at Stephen's Park, and "Viva! Quad~Cities" all reflect Moline's diverse heritage. Downtown Moline also plays host to events of regional importance such as Taste of the Quad Cities, Race for the Cure, the Quad City Marathon, and the Lighting of the Commons.

=== Present ===
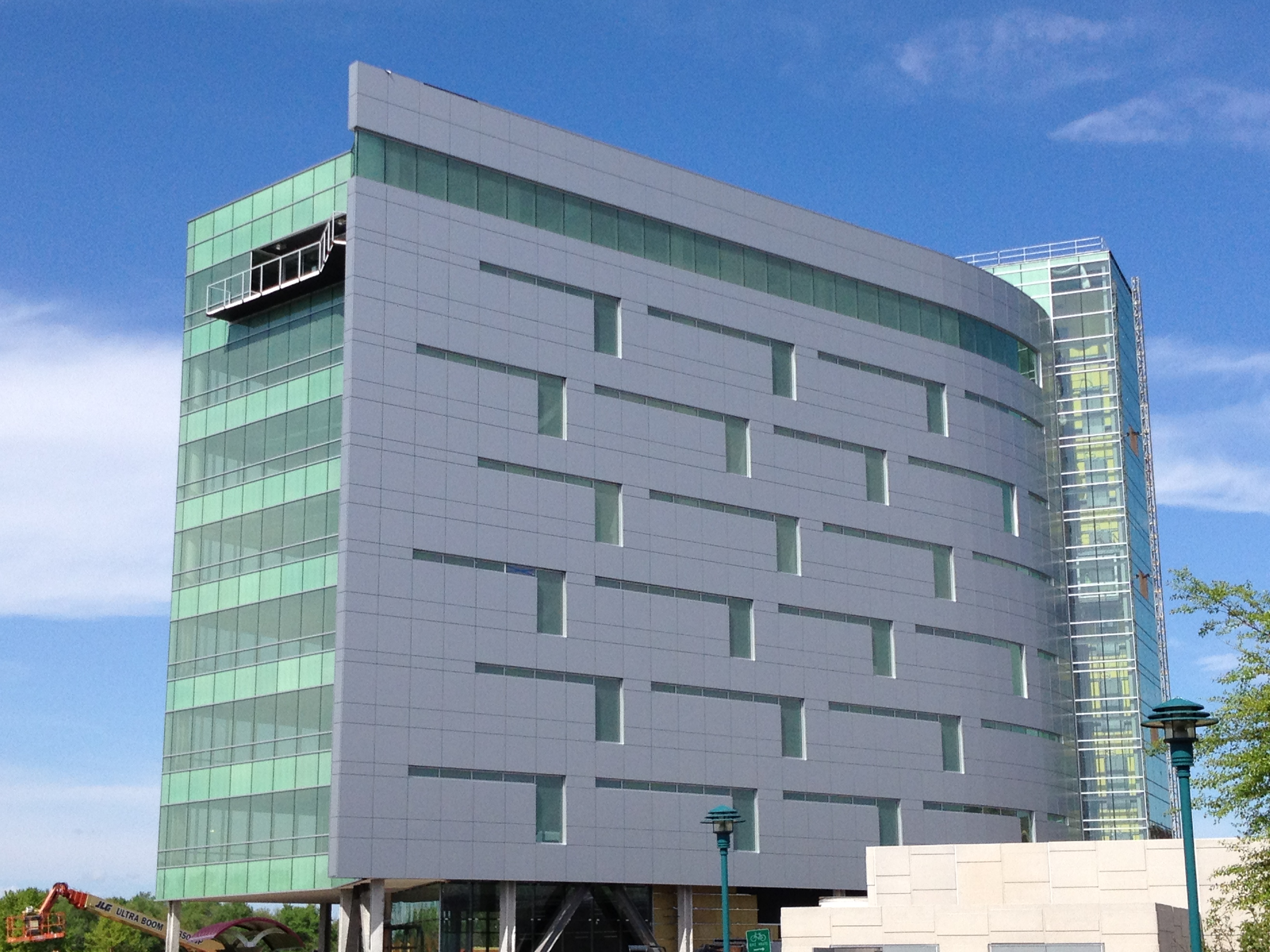
The Kone Centre in downtown Moline, Illinois

Since the late 2000s to the early 2010s, Moline has seen growth in its downtown area. The current projects include a new nine-story building for Kone Elevator's American Headquarters (formerly Montgomery Elevator) and its nearly 250 Quad Cities' area employees. The building opened in August 2012, and also has a combination of active and passive energy strategies includes an array of 1365 distributed solar panels, which is now the third largest in the state of Illinois. Other projects include new lofts that opened up in 2011, and the I-74 Corridor Project is planned to build 3 auxiliary lanes from Avenue of the Cities passed 53rd Street in Davenport, with a new I-74 Bridge spanning 4 lanes in each direction, also an observation deck overlooking the Mississippi River. The new I-74 bridge was completed with a ribbon-cutting ceremony on December 1, 2021. In 2012, Western Illinois University-Quad Cities opened the new river front campus, an $18.2 million first phase of the project has 60,000 square feet, making it the only college campus along the Mississippi River. It includes 14 classrooms and four meeting/conference rooms. Western Illinois University-Quad Cities continued to grow its presence and list of educational opportunities they provide with the completion of Phase II in 2014. The $38 million, five interconnected buildings doubled the size of available facilities at WIU-Quad Cities. The campus addition houses academic programs and services from the colleges of Arts and Sciences, Education and Human Services, and Fine Arts and Communication, and also includes the other programs and services from the former WIU-QC 60th Street campus, including the library, WQPT-Quad Cities public television and classes offered through the Quad Cities Graduate Study Center.

More projects are being planned, all a part of the city's "Moline Centre" downtown plan.

In January 2025, Moline Police Department Chief Darren Gault announced a full staff of 84 sworn officers.

== Geography ==
According to the United States Census Bureau, the city has a total area of 16.935 square miles (43.86 km^{2}), of which 16.767 square miles (43.43 km^{2}) is land and 0.168 square miles (0.44 km^{2}) (0.99%) is water.

The city of Moline is nestled beside and on a broad bluff situated between the banks of the Mississippi River and Rock River in Rock Island County, Illinois. The city's highland areas are cut across by many deep ravines that break up the city into natural neighborhoods. The city is bounded to the east by East Moline and to the west by Rock Island.

Moline is located approximately 165 miles (266 km) west of Chicago and approximately 164 miles (264 km) northwest of Springfield, Illinois. Moline and its neighboring communities within the Quad Cities form the largest urban area along the Mississippi River between the Twin Cities (Minneapolis-St. Paul) to the north and St. Louis to the south, and are located approximately halfway between them. The area is served by four interstate highways: Interstate 74 (which runs directly through Moline, bisecting it in roughly equal halves), Interstate 280 (which serves as a ring road around the Quad Cities), Interstate 80 (which crosses the Mississippi River a few miles to the northeast of Moline), and Interstate 88 (which begins on the eastern border of the Quad Cities and ends in Hillside, Illinois, near Chicago).

=== Neighborhoods ===
Through the Neighborhood Partnership Program, the City of Moline has established nine city-sponsored neighborhood associations and is working to form more. These associations assist their residents by organizing neighborhood clean-up days, participating in the crime watch program, planning social activities, and other activities.

Notable neighborhoods include Moline's downtown, now known as Moline Centre, which is a historic area bounded approximately by 12th and 34th Streets and the Mississippi River and 6th Avenue. The area is home to Moline's City Hall, its original, and now vacant, Carnegie-sponsored public library, and other civic institutions.

Other neighborhoods include Floreciente, Olde Towne, Uptown, Overlook, Karsten's Park, Wharton (home to Wharton Field House which gives the neighborhood its name), Hamilton Heights, Wildwood, Prospect Park, Tartan Oaks, Park Hill, Forest Hill, Highland, Villa Park, Green Acres, Molette, Rockview Estates, Homewood (home to the Playcrafter's Barn Theater), Heritage Park, Stewartville, Deerview, and Walton Hills.

=== Climate ===
Typical of the northern half of Illinois, Moline experiences a humid continental climate (Köppen Dfa) with hot, humid summers and cold, moderately snowy winters; precipitation is distributed throughout the year but is greater in the warmer months. The normal monthly mean temperature ranges from 22.6 °F (−5.2 °C) in January to 75.4 °F (24.1 °C) in July; on average, there are 23 days of 90 °F (32 °C)+ highs, 43 days with a high at or below freezing, and 11 days of sub-0 °F (−18 °C) lows annually. Extremes in temperature have ranged from 111 °F (44 °C), set on July 14, 1936, down to −33 °F (−36 °C), set on January 30, 2019; the record coldest maximum temperature is −12 °F (−24 °C) on January 18, 1994 and January 29, 1966, while the record warmest minimum is 84 °F (29 °C), set the same day of the record high. (Note: The summer of 1936, as part of the Dust Bowl, was particularly extreme, setting the records for annual number of daily highs reaching 90 °F (59) and 100 °F (21), as well as the hottest month on record; July averaged 85.0 °F (29.4 °C).) Temperatures reach 100 °F (38 °C) only several years per decade, and −20 °F (−29 °C) readings are even rarer; the last occurrence of each was July 25, 2012 and January 31, 2019. The average window for freezing temperatures is October 10 thru April 24, allowing a growing season of 168 days.

Snowfall averages 31.6 inches (80 cm) per season, but has ranged as low as 11.1 in (28 cm) in 1901–02 to 69.7 in (177 cm) in 1974–75; on average, measurable (≥0.1 in or 0.25 cm) snow occurs from November 21 to March 26, and rarely in October and April. Unlike much of the Midwest, measurable snow has never officially occurred in May and September.

Climate data for Quad Cities (Quad City International Airport), 1991–2020 normals, (Note: Mean monthly maxima and minima (i.e. the expected highest and lowest temperature readings at any point during the year or given month) calculated based on data at said location from 1991 to 2020.) extremes 1871–present (Note: Official precipitation records for the Quad Cities kept at the Weather Bureau Office (WBO) in Davenport, Iowa from July 1871 to December 1931, alternating between Quad City Int'l (KMLI) and the Davenport WBO from January 1932 to 17 February 1937, and remaining at KMLI since 18 February 1937. Temperature, snowfall, and snow depth records date to 1 January 1874, 1 August 1882, and 1 January 1901, respectively. For more information, see Threadex)
Month	Jan	Feb	Mar	Apr	May	Jun	Jul	Aug	Sep	Oct	Nov	Dec	Year
Record high °F (°C)	69 (21)	79 (26)	88 (31)	93 (34)	104 (40)	104 (40)	111 (44)	106 (41)	100 (38)	95 (35)	80 (27)	75 (24)	111 (44)
Mean maximum °F (°C)	53.4 (11.9)	57.6 (14.2)	73.6 (23.1)	82.7 (28.2)	89.2 (31.8)	94.0 (34.4)	95.1 (35.1)	93.8 (34.3)	91.2 (32.9)	84.1 (28.9)	69.8 (21.0)	57.6 (14.2)	96.9 (36.1)
Mean daily maximum °F (°C)	31.8 (−0.1)	36.6 (2.6)	49.9 (9.9)	63.0 (17.2)	73.9 (23.3)	83.1 (28.4)	86.1 (30.1)	84.1 (28.9)	77.9 (25.5)	64.8 (18.2)	49.8 (9.9)	37.0 (2.8)	61.5 (16.4)
Daily mean °F (°C)	23.3 (−4.8)	27.7 (−2.4)	39.7 (4.3)	51.4 (10.8)	62.5 (16.9)	72.1 (22.3)	75.5 (24.2)	73.4 (23.0)	66.1 (18.9)	53.7 (12.1)	40.4 (4.7)	28.9 (−1.7)	51.2 (10.7)
Mean daily minimum °F (°C)	14.8 (−9.6)	18.8 (−7.3)	29.6 (−1.3)	39.9 (4.4)	51.1 (10.6)	61.0 (16.1)	64.9 (18.3)	62.7 (17.1)	54.2 (12.3)	42.6 (5.9)	30.9 (−0.6)	20.8 (−6.2)	40.9 (4.9)
Mean minimum °F (°C)	−9.4 (−23.0)	−2.3 (−19.1)	9.6 (−12.4)	24.7 (−4.1)	35.2 (1.8)	48.0 (8.9)	54.0 (12.2)	52.1 (11.2)	39.1 (3.9)	26.3 (−3.2)	14.1 (−9.9)	−0.2 (−17.9)	−14.2 (−25.7)
Record low °F (°C)	−33 (−36)	−28 (−33)	−19 (−28)	7 (−14)	25 (−4)	39 (4)	46 (8)	40 (4)	24 (−4)	11 (−12)	−10 (−23)	−24 (−31)	−33 (−36)
Average precipitation inches (mm)	1.66 (42)	1.83 (46)	2.62 (67)	3.81 (97)	4.67 (119)	5.01 (127)	4.23 (107)	3.97 (101)	3.32 (84)	2.81 (71)	2.30 (58)	2.04 (52)	38.27 (972)
Average snowfall inches (cm)	10.8 (27)	8.6 (22)	4.4 (11)	1.1 (2.8)	0.0 (0.0)	0.0 (0.0)	0.0 (0.0)	0.0 (0.0)	0.0 (0.0)	0.3 (0.76)	2.1 (5.3)	8.8 (22)	36.1 (92)
Average precipitation days (≥ 0.01 in)	9.3	8.7	10.4	11.3	12.2	11.3	8.6	9.4	8.4	9.0	8.9	9.5	117.0
Average snowy days (≥ 0.1 in)	7.2	6.0	3.2	0.8	0.0	0.0	0.0	0.0	0.0	0.3	1.7	5.9	25.1
Average relative humidity (%)	69.9	69.8	68.3	64.3	64.9	65.8	70.5	73.3	72.8	68.1	71.3	74.0	69.4
Average dew point °F (°C)	11.7 (−11.3)	16.2 (−8.8)	27.0 (−2.8)	37.2 (2.9)	48.2 (9.0)	57.9 (14.4)	64.0 (17.8)	62.6 (17.0)	54.3 (12.4)	41.5 (5.3)	30.4 (−0.9)	18.3 (−7.6)	39.1 (3.9)
Mean monthly sunshine hours	148.1	153.8	180.5	210.1	255.1	284.6	301.9	271.4	222.0	192.9	121.7	113.9	2,456
Percentage possible sunshine	50	52	49	53	57	63	66	63	59	56	41	40	55
Source: NOAA (relative humidity, dew point, and sun 1961−1990)

== Demographics ==
Historical population
Census	Pop.	Note	%±
1840	894		—
1850	4,283		379.1%
1860	9,458		120.8%
1870	12,485		32.0%
1880	14,895		19.3%
1890	16,752		12.5%
1900	19,524		16.5%
1910	20,782		6.4%
1920	21,492		3.4%
1930	21,487		0.0%
1940	23,980		11.6%
1950	32,574		35.8%
1960	35,582		9.2%
1970	38,480		8.1%
1980	45,690		18.7%
1990	42,485		−7.0%
2000	43,768		3.0%
2010	43,471		−0.7%
2020	42,985		−1.1%
2025 (est.)	42,362		−1.4%
U.S. Decennial Census; 2020 Census

=== Racial and ethnic composition ===
Moline, Illinois – Racial and ethnic composition Note: the US Census treats Hispanic/Latino as an ethnic category. This table excludes Latinos from the racial categories and assigns them to a separate category. Hispanics/Latinos may be of any race.
Race / Ethnicity (NH = Non-Hispanic)	Pop 2000	Pop 2010	Pop 2020	% 2000	% 2010	% 2020
White alone (NH)	36,030	32,674	28,038	82.32%	75.14%	65.23%
Black or African American alone (NH)	1,325	2,168	3,661	3.03%	4.99%	8.52%
Native American or Alaska Native alone (NH)	56	72	75	0.13%	0.17%	0.17%
Asian alone (NH)	601	1,023	1,276	1.37%	2.35%	2.97%
Native Hawaiian or Pacific Islander alone (NH)	9	7	13	0.02%	0.02%	0.03%
Other race alone (NH)	40	23	132	0.09%	0.05%	0.31%
Mixed race or Multiracial (NH)	495	752	1,759	1.13%	1.73%	4.09%
Hispanic or Latino (any race)	5,212	6,764	8,031	11.91%	15.56%	18.68%
Total	43,768	43,483	42,985	100.00%	100.00%	100.00%

=== 2020 census ===
As of the 2020 census, Moline had a population of 42,985. The median age was 39.5 years. 22.8% of residents were under the age of 18 and 19.4% of residents were 65 years of age or older. For every 100 females there were 93.8 males, and for every 100 females age 18 and over there were 91.6 males age 18 and over.

100.0% of residents lived in urban areas, while 0.0% lived in rural areas.

There were 18,555 households in Moline, of which 27.4% had children under the age of 18 living in them. Of all households, 40.1% were married-couple households, 21.0% were households with a male householder and no spouse or partner present, and 31.2% were households with a female householder and no spouse or partner present. About 35.2% of all households were made up of individuals and 14.9% had someone living alone who was 65 years of age or older.

There were 20,266 housing units, of which 8.4% were vacant. The homeowner vacancy rate was 1.9% and the rental vacancy rate was 10.6%.

Racial composition as of the 2020 census
Race	Number	Percent
White	30,152	70.1%
Black or African American	3,792	8.8%
American Indian and Alaska Native	347	0.8%
Asian	1,296	3.0%
Native Hawaiian and Other Pacific Islander	13	0.0%
Some other race	3,072	7.1%
Two or more races	4,313	10.0%
Hispanic or Latino (of any race)	8,031	18.7%

=== 2010 census ===
As of the 2010 census, there were 43,977 people, 19,032 households, and 11,594 families residing in the city. The population density was 2,805.7 inhabitants per square mile (1,083.3/km^{2}). There were 19,487 housing units at an average density of 1,249.2 per square mile (482.3/km^{2}). The racial makeup of the city was 86.2% White, 4.6% African American, 0.2% Native American, 3.5% Asian, 3% from other races, and 2.5% from two or more races. Hispanic or Latino of any race were 9.4% of the population.

There were 19,032 households, out of which 28.8% had children under the age of 18 living with them, 48.8% were married couples living together, 10.4% had a female householder with no husband present, and 37.3% were non-families. 31.9% of all households were made up of individuals, and 12.6% had someone living alone who was 65 years of age or older. The average household size was 2.35 and the average family size was 2.97.

In the city, the age distribution of the population shows 24.0% under the age of 18, 9.2% from 18 to 24, 27.8% from 25 to 44, 23.6% from 45 to 64, and 15.4% who were 65 years of age or older. The median age was 38 years. For every 100 females, there were 91.5 males. For every 100 females age 18 and over, there were 88.9 males.

The median income for a household in the city was $47,970, and the median income for a family was $59,292. Males had a median income of $36,586 versus $24,711 for females. The per capita income for the city was $26,710. About 3.1% of families and 4.5% of the population were below the poverty line, including 9.1% of those under age 18 and 2.1% of those age 65 or over.

== Economy ==
=== Largest employers ===
According to the city's 2017 Comprehensive Annual Financial Report, the largest employers in the city are:

#	Employer	# of Employees
1	Deere & Company	2,775
2	Trinity Moline	2,700
3	Moline School District No. 40	855
4	Western Illinois University - Quad Cities	501
5	Hy-Vee	500
6	Black Hawk College	490
7	Walmart Supercenter	450
8	City of Moline	419
9	UnitedHealth Group	360
10	iWireless	300

== Arts and culture ==
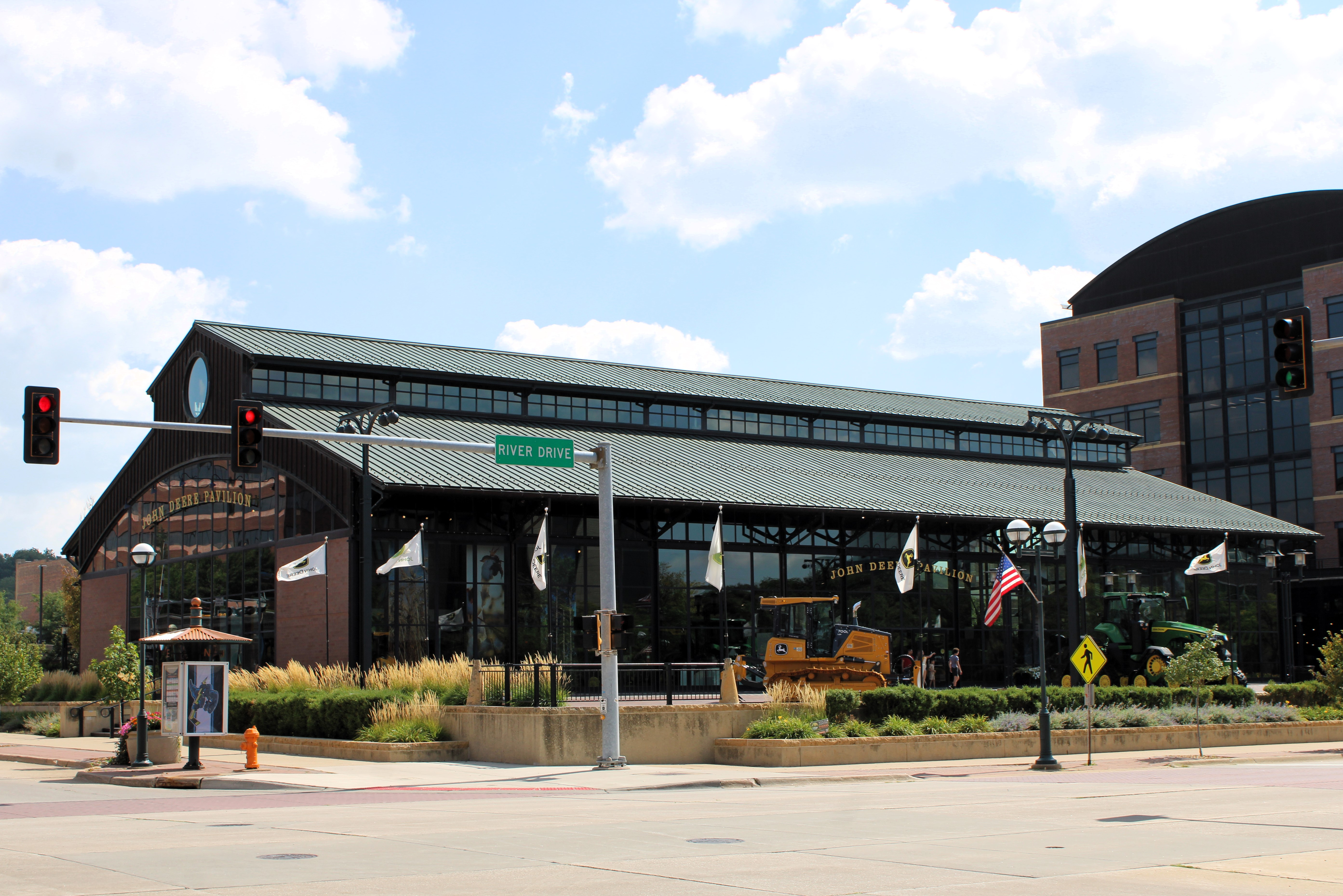
The John Deere Pavilion in Moline

The John Deere Pavilion at John Deere Commons contains exhibits celebrating the history of the agricultural implements industry in the Midwest and showcases a variety of past and present John Deere plows, tractors, combines, and other machinery. The LeClaire Hotel is the tallest building in Moline.

Official Historical Landmarks are determined by the Moline Historic Preservation Commission and updated on the official City of Moline Historic Landmarks website. Some of the notable Historic Landmarks include, The Moline Public Library, located in downtown Moline, and the John Deere House, located at 1217 11th Avenue.

== Sports ==
Moline was home to the Tri-Cities Blackhawks, a professional basketball team that evolved into what is today the Atlanta Hawks. The Blackhawks played at Wharton Field House from 1946 to 1951.

For 27 seasons between 1914 and 1948, the Moline Plowboys played minor league baseball at Browning Field. The Plowboys played primarily in the Three-I League. Such notable future Major Leaguers as Rube Ehrhardt, Peanuts Lowrey, Claude Passeau and Eddie Waitkus played for the Plowboys, whose team president for three years was Warren Giles, later inducted in the National Baseball Hall of Fame.

Moline's Vibrant Arena at The MARK is currently home to the Quad City Steamwheelers, an indoor football team in the Indoor Football League. The Vibrant Arena is also home to the Quad City Storm of the SPHL The Quad Cities are also home to the Quad City River Bandits, the Single A Midwest League affiliates of the Kansas City Royals. The River Bandits play their home games at Modern Woodmen Park (formerly John O'Donnell Stadium) in Davenport, Iowa.

On Sunday, June 15, 1997, Moline hosted World Championship Wrestling's The Great American Bash pay-per-view event.

== Parks and recreation ==
The Moline Parks & Recreation Department maintains 18 parks (taking up 728 acres) in addition to various other recreational facilities and cemeteries. Moline's noteworthy parks include Riverside Park, home to the Riverside Family Aquatic Center and to a busy baseball and tennis complex; Prospect Park, home to the Quad City Music Guild; and the Green Valley Sports Complex. The department also maintains the Ben Butterworth Parkway, a four-mile (6 km)-long scenic trail along the Mississippi River running between downtown Moline to the west and East Moline to the east. The Channel Cat Water Taxi and the Celebration Belle, a non-gaming excursion riverboat built in the 19th century style, both dock along the Parkway.

In addition, the Moline Activity Center offers programs and activities for retired and semi-retired adults.

== Education ==
The majority of Moline is in the Moline School District No. 40, which serves the student-age populations of Moline and Coal Valley. The district educates approximately 7,500 students in twelve elementary schools, two middle schools (John Deere Middle School and Woodrow Wilson Middle School) and one high school (Moline High School).

Other school districts with sections of the city limits include East Moline School District 37 and United Township High School District 30 with an eastern section, and Rock Island–Milan School District 41 with portions to the southwest.

Seton Catholic School serves the large Catholic population of Moline. It has the highest enrollment of any elementary and middle school in the Quad Cities as well as in the Catholic Diocese of Peoria. The school is supported by the Moline parishes of Sacred Heart, Christ the King, and St. Mary's.

St. Paul's Lutheran School is a Christian Pre-K-8 grade school of the Wisconsin Evangelical Lutheran Synod in Moline.

Moline is also home to private schools such as Quad Cities Christian School, a non-denominational Christian school.

Moline is home to two tertiary educational institutions. One is Black Hawk College, which is a community college in Moline, with a satellite campus in Kewanee, Illinois. A Western Illinois University-Quad Cities which is the only public, four-year university in the Quad Cities region. The campus is located in Moline along the Mississippi Riverfront at the former site of the 60,000-square-foot (5,600 m^{2}) John Deere Technical Site.

== Media ==
The Quad Cities has numerous media outlets, including dozens of radio stations; local affiliates of Fox, NBC, ABC, and CBS; and three newspapers. The Dispatch, formerly the Daily Dispatch, is the traditional paper of the city and also serves Coal Valley, East Moline, and other communities to the east. The Rock Island Argus, owned by the same company as the Dispatch, carries substantially the same print coverage.

The Quad City Times, formerly the Davenport Times-Democrat, is based in Davenport but prints an Illinois edition that is widely read.

Of the local television stations, the ABC affiliate, WQAD-TV makes their home in the Prospect Park neighborhood in studios adjacent to the park itself.

Moline was mentioned by name in the lyrics of Creedence Clearwater Revival's song "It Came Out of the Sky" from the 1969 album Willy and the Poor Boys and in Bob Seger's song "The Fire Down Below" from the 1976 album Night Moves.

== Transportation ==
The Quad Cities International Airport, located on the southern fringe of the city to the south of the Rock River, is home to four commercial airlines providing non-stop flights to eight different cities. This airport is the third busiest one in the state of Illinois, following Chicago's O'Hare International Airport and Midway Airport.

Quad Cities MetroLINK provides bus service on numerous routes connecting Moline to destinations across the Quad Cities. The primary hub of the MetroLINK system is in downtown Moline at Centre Station.

The I-74 Bridge serves as a major crossing of the Mississippi River. The first span, of the suspension bridge type, was constructed in 1935, and a second one joined it in 1959. Both were upgraded to interstate highway standards in the mid-1970s, and replaced by new spans in the 2020s due to obsolescence caused by increased use of Interstate 74.

Moline was served by the Rock Island main line between Chicago and Colorado Springs. The line is currently served by the Iowa Interstate.

== Notable people ==
- Dorothy Sears Ainsworth, director of physical education at Smith College, 1926–1960
- Kevin Anderson, opera singer
- Jack Barlow, country singer
- Bonnie Bartlett, television and film actress
- Louie Bellson, jazz drummer
- Vincent Hugo Bendix, inventor and industrialist
- Ken Berry, actor
- Dave Blunts, hip-hop artist
- Virgil Bozeman, Illinois state representative and lawyer
- Grace Lincoln Hall Brosseau, President General of the Daughters of the American Revolution
- Don Carothers, football player
- Charles F. Carpentier, businessman and politician, was born in Moline.
- Donald D. Carpentier, businessman and politician, was born in Moline.
- Roy James Carver, industrialist and philanthropist
- Albert M. Crampton, Chief Justice of the Illinois Supreme Court
- Brad Cresswell, radio broadcaster and opera singer
- Doris Davenport, actress
- John Deere, tractor maker
- Acie Earl, power forward and center with several NBA teams
- Carl Ed, cartoonist (Harold Teen)
- John Getz, actor (The Fly and The Social Network)
- Warren Giles, executive in Baseball Hall of Fame, lived in Moline
- Oscar Graham, baseball player
- Ron Hallstrom, offensive tackle with Green Bay Packers
- Warren E. Hearnes, Governor of Missouri 1965–73, born in Moline
- Robert R. Heider, Wisconsin State Assemblyman
- Donald A. Henss, Illinois state representative and lawyer; born in Moline
- Brad Hopkins, offensive tackle with the Tennessee Titans
- Corey Jahns, drummer with the Funk Brothers
- Jim Jamieson, golfer with the PGA Tour
- Robert White Johnson, songwriter; co-writer of "Where Does My Heart Beat Now" (Celine Dion)
- Steve Kuberski, power forward and center with the Boston Celtics, Milwaukee Bucks and Buffalo Braves
- Katherine Lanpher, journalist and podcaster
- Becky Lynch, WWE athlete; resides in Moline.
- Dayton Moore, general manager of Kansas City Royals; lived in Moline
- Gene Oliver, catcher, first baseman, outfielder for five Major League Baseball teams; born in Moline
- Aisha Praught-Leer, distance runner, two-time Olympian
- Tom Railsback, US congressman (1967–1983)
- Heather Rattray, actress
- Ed Reimers, television announcer
- Wallace M. Rogerson, exercise leader
- Seth Rollins, WWE athlete; resides in Moline.
- Richard Sargent, painter, muralist, and illustrator for The Saturday Evening Post; born in Moline and graduated from Moline High School
- Sharm Scheuerman, Iowa basketball player and coach
- Marjorie Allen Seiffert, poet who was born and lived in Moline
- Anne Ripley Smith, wife of AA co-founder Bob Smith, nicknamed "Mother of Alcoholics Anonymous"
- Eric Sorensen, U.S. representative
- Dean Stone, All-Star pitcher who played for six Major League Baseball teams; born in Moline
- Dan Stoneking, American journalist who was sports editor of the Minneapolis Star and president of the Professional Hockey Writers' Association
- Don Sundquist, 47th governor of Tennessee
- Mildred Lund Tyson, composer born in Moline
- Al Van Camp, first baseman and outfielder for the Cleveland Indians and Boston Red Sox; born in Moline
- Dwight Deere Wiman, Broadway producer
- Merton Yale Cady, architect and builder

== See also ==
- List of tallest buildings in the Quad Cities
