= Old Post Office (Moline, Illinois) =

Historic Post Office

- Old Moline Post Office
- U.S. Historic district – Contributing property
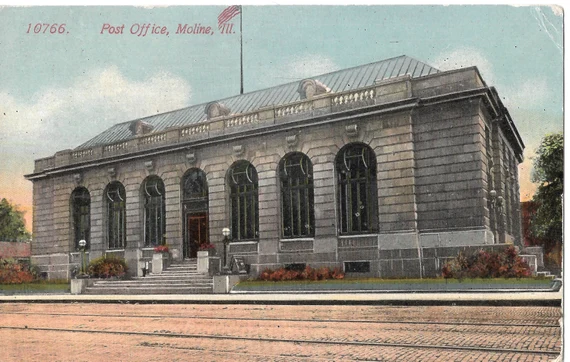
- 1916 Postcard of the old Moline Post Office

- Location within Illinois Location within the United States
- Location: Moline, Rock Island County, Illinois
- Coordinates: 41.5095°N 90.5131°W
- Built: 1910
- Architectural style: Beaux Arts
- Added to NRHP: August 30, 2007

The Old Moline Post Office is a former post office building located at 1800 River Drive in Moline, Illinois. Built in 1910 it is listed on the National Register of Historic Places as part of the Moline Downtown Commercial Historic District. Built in 1910 at a cost of $157,000, it operated as a post office only until 1935, when an increase in mail volume necessitated a new office constructed one block away at 514 17th Street.

== History ==
Prior to its construction the parcel of land was occupied by the former home of businessman John Deere, who wished to live close to his factories. The house was demolished in 1908 to make room for the new post office, but the Deere family had moved out nearly three decades prior. The house they moved to is preserved as the John Deere House, a listed NRHP structure.

The Moline Downtown Commercial Historic District, of which the building is a part of, was added to the NRHP in August 2007. The district includes 141 buildings over 33 acres of downtown Moline, Illinois.

The building has seen several tenants since the USPS moved locations in the 1935. The open floor plan made it suitable for use as an armory by the Illinois National Guard in the 1940s, and in 1987 the building saw extensive restoration by the Montgomery Elevator Company, including a new roof and interior furnishings.

In early 2025, local architecture firm Streamline Architects purchased the property to use as a new office, relocating from the historic Moline Automobile Company factory. Restoration of the building began in July of that year, including the reinstallation of original fixtures and bringing the property to current ADA standards.
