= Moline High School =

Public high school in Moline, Illinois, U.S.

Location
- 3600 Avenue of the Cities; Moline, (Rock Island County), Illinois 61265; United States; 41°29′14.5″N 90°29′3.9″W

Information
- Type: Public high school
- Established: 1908; 118 years ago
- School district: Moline-Coal Valley School District No. 40
- Principal: Christopher Moore
- Teaching staff: 119.45 (FTE)
- Grades: 9–12
- Enrollment: 2,195 (2024–2025)
- Student to teacher ratio: 18.38
- Color
- Team name: Maroons
- Rival: United Township Panthers; Rock Island Rocks
- Newspaper: Line 0'Type
- Yearbook: The M
- Website: mhs.molineschools.org

Moline High School is a public four-year high school located in Moline, Illinois, a city in Rock Island County, in the Midwest area of the United States. The school is the only public high school in the city of Moline, and is part of Moline-Coal Valley School District #40.

The district (of which this is the sole comprehensive high school) includes the majority of Moline along with the portion of Coal Valley in Rock Island County, and half of Rock Island Arsenal, along with a small piece of Milan. The Rock Island Arsenal garrison provides a school bus service to the Moline district from the on-post residences.

== History ==
After the founding of the Moline Board of Education, Moline High School took the form of a two-room schoolhouse. It was replaced with Central/Washington school, which housed grades 1-13, after its building completion in 1873.

Still getting progressively more spacious, a building nicknamed "the Castle" by passing travelers on the Mississippi became the new Moline High School in 1894. Its moniker referred to the architectural style which took departure from the basic rectangular designs. It became "Central Grammar", an eighth-grade school, once the new 1914 building was built nearby. Central then was used as an annex for the high school on the same land, and as that became less necessary, Moline Community College occupied rooms. The basement was used as a recreational center as the building was losing its purpose.

In 1928, construction of the Wharton Field House was completed. This indoor arena, located a mile and a half from the high school campus, can house up to 6,000 fans at a time and has since become a historic landmark for the Moline community. In May 2020, Wharton Field House made the final four in a Twitter poll where users voted to determine the "Best Gym in Illinois."

Finally, the most recent facility was built on the Avenue of the Cities. In close proximity to the former middle school, Calvin Coolidge, and the Roosevelt elementary school, the 1958 building is the most developed. It was built at a cost of about $4 million (equivalent to $44,640,000 in 2025). One of the more striking designs featuring outer walls made nearly completely from glass, it introduced protruding wings which provided for fairly spacious classrooms and subject specialization. The large property allowed the architects to spread out the design, with one hallway stretching over 800 feet long. Despite its three-floor-section and countless classrooms, in 1968, a new J-wing and west gym were constructed to compensate for the over-population. It currently contains about 2,400 students from the combined Moline and Coal Valley areas as well as many teachers from the main Quad Cities area.

In May 2017, it was announced that a $7 million grant from the Robert E. Bartlett Family Foundation would be given to the high school to fund a new performing arts center. It was also revealed that the school district would pitch in $3 million more raised from local sales tax. In March 2019, the Bartlett Performing Arts Center opened to the public.

In 2021, the school held a ribbon-cutting ceremony for its new $14 million athletic facility, which was built to address space limitations for sports practice and gym classes. The project, completed in two phases, includes new wrestling rooms, a weight room, upgraded locker rooms, a gymnasium, and various sports courts, with facilities available for both students and the public.

== Extracurricular activities ==
=== Athletics ===
Softball has been an official sport in Illinois since 1976, and Moline has won the state title six times (in 1987, 1988, 1994, 1996, 2006, 2011)—putting them in second place in the number of state softball titles, behind leader Casey Westfield which has seven titles. Moline is one of five schools that has won titles in back-to-back seasons. In the 2005–06 season, Moline won more games than any other school in the history of the state of Illinois without posting a loss, compiling a (40–0–1) record, and winning the girls' AA state title.

In football, the Moline Maroons have Conference: Western Big 6, Division: Division 7A, Overall Record: 9-2, Conference Record: 7-0, State Division Rank: 14, DMA Rank: 6, State Rank: 57.

In Basketball, the Moline Maroons won state in 2023 for 4A boys basketball

=== Arts ===
Moline High School has various musical ensembles including Freshman Band, Concert Band, Symphonic Band, Concert Orchestra, Symphonic Orchestra, Concert Choir, Bella Voce, Bass Choir, Treble Choir, Jazz Choir, Jazz Band, and Chamber Orchestra.

In 2026 the Symphonic Orchestra and Bella Voce went to perform at IMEC (Illinois Music Education Conference).

== Notable alumni ==
- Bonnie Bartlett: Television and film actress
- Louis Bellson: jazz drummer
- Ken Berry: actor
- Don Carothers: football player
- Brad Cresswell: radio broadcaster and opera singer
- Acie Earl: professional basketball player, Boston Celtics
- Mickey Erickson: professional football player, Chicago Cardinals and Boston Braves
- Brad Hopkins: professional football player, Tennessee Titans
- Barry Huntley, Distinguished Inventor & Engineer Intel Corporation
- Jim Jamieson: professional golfer
- Steve Kuberski: professional basketball player, Boston Celtics
- Dayton Moore: Kansas City Royals General Manager
- Stephen Norton: Drummer for Louden Swain
- Tom Railsback: U.S. Congressman from 1967–83
- Jeremy Schoemaker: internet entrepreneur
- Donald K. Sundquist: former governor of Tennessee
- Aisha Praught: Olympic runner
