= John Deere Pavilion =

Attraction and museum in Moline, Illinois

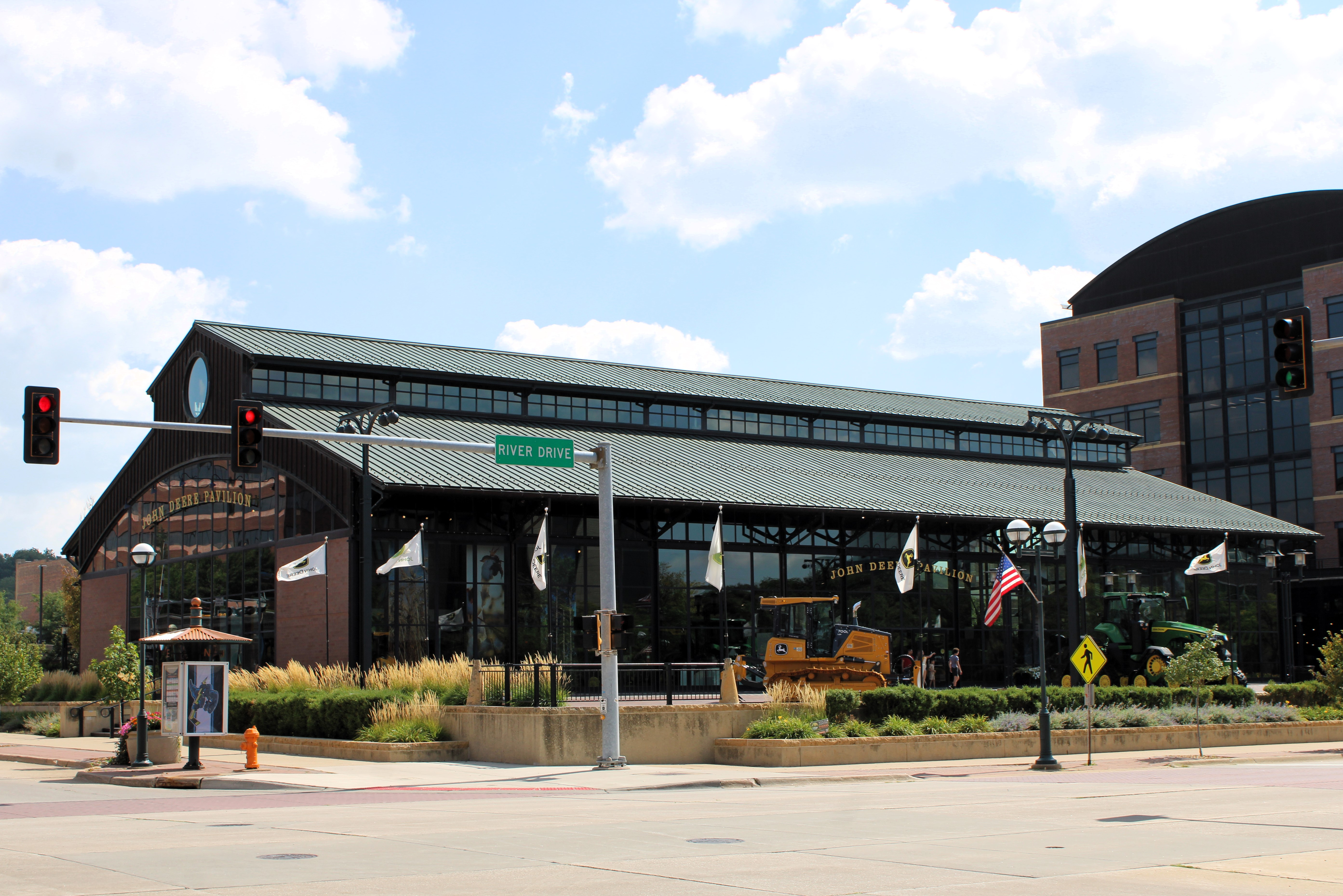
The John Deere Pavilion in Moline

The John Deere Pavilion is an attraction and museum located in Moline, Illinois. The Pavilion opened in 1997 as part of an urban renewal project on the site of the former John Deere Plow Works (first built in 1848). Today the area includes Vibrant Arena at the Mark, a Wyndham Hotel, and several restaurants. The Pavilion serves as the official visitor center for John Deere, whose world headquarters are located a few miles away (but is not open for public tours). Next door is the John Deere Store, the largest retail store for John Deere merchandise.

Opened in 1997, the Pavilion has drawn over 150,000 visitors annually. It is one of the top attractions in the region and contributed directly to the development of other corporate visitor centers such as Coca-Cola and Caterpillar Inc. The pavilion is free to enter and full of activities for all ages. Antique equipment includes a model LA tractor, a 4010 cutaway tractor from 1960, a model D tractor, the All-Wheel Drive tractor from 1918, and a model 55 combine from 1949. There is new equipment inside and out front. There is also an interactive exhibit inside called "For Generations" that features how John Deere customers use equipment and technology around the world. Exhibits include interactives and both new and historical equipment to climb in and explore.

== See also ==
- Quad Cities Landmarks
