= Moline-Coal Valley School District 40 =

School district in Illinois, United States

The Moline-Coal Valley School District 40 is a school district headquartered in Moline, Illinois. The district serves about 7,300 students and has more than 1,100 employees. The district superintendent is Dr. Rachel Savage.

The Moline Education Center, home of the Moline-Coal Valley School District administrative team.

Located in Rock Island County, the district includes the majority of Moline along with the portion of Coal Valley in Rock Island County, and half of Rock Island Arsenal, along with a small piece of Milan. The Rock Island Arsenal garrison provides school bus service to the Moline district from on-post residences.

== Academics ==
Moline High School has 13 academic departments offering a total of nearly 150 courses, 15 of which are Advanced Placement. Additionally, the district offers special education services, English language services, and a Dual Language Academy, at which students learn to read, write, speak, and listen in English and Spanish. There is also a robust industrial technology program, which teaches such trade skills as engineering, welding, machine technology, wood technology, and computer numeric control machine technology. Students also have paid apprenticeship opportunities in machining and welding, as well as pre-certification courses in automobile mechanics, cosmetology, fire science, and health care.

== Extracurricular Activities ==
Moline High School has more than 40 extracurricular activities for students, featuring a wide variety of choices. These include art, business, drama, fishing, gaming, history, journalism, music, and science. The middle schools provide about a dozen extracurricular options, including an academic team, builders club, engineering, Legos, and Special Olympics.

== Athletics ==
The Moline High School boys' basketball team celebrates its 2023 boys' Class 4A state championship. The Maroons finished 35-3 and featured two future Division I players, including that season's Mr. Basketball in Illinois, Brock Harding.

Moline High School fields teams in these sports: boys' baseball, basketball, bowling, football, golf, soccer, swimming, tennis, track & field, and wrestling; and girls' basketball, bowling, golf, soccer, softball, swimming & diving, tennis, track & field, volleyball, and wrestling. The district's two middle schools field teams in basketball, cheerleading, cross country, football, soccer, tennis, track & field, volleyball, and wrestling. Additionally, John Deere and Woodrow Wilson Middle Schools have a combined swim team.

The Maroons were the 2023 Class 4A Illinois High School Association boys' basketball state champions, led by that year's Mr. Basketball in Illinois, Brock Harding, and his fellow future NCAA Division I player, Owen Freeman. Moline won state softball championships in 1987, 1988, 1994, 1996, 2006, and 2011.

== Moline High School History ==
Moline High School's first graduating class in 1878 consisted of five students. In 1894, the district built a high school that came to be knowns as The Castle because of twin turrets that could be seen from the Mississippi River. District expansion required the construction of an adjacent building in 1914 to serve high school students, with The Castle being repurposed to an eighth-grade school. Shortly thereafter, the prominent Browning family donated land that would be used for the construction of Browning Field and Wharton Field House, both of which are still used for Moline Maroons games.

The current MHS campus was built in 1958 and sits between 23rd and 26th Avenues and 34th and 41st Streets. Significant expansions in the 1960s, 2010s, and 2020s were necessitated by more diversified and expanded academic focuses. An expansive weight and fitness room was also added. The typical MHS graduating class has about 550 students.

== Schools ==
High school

- Moline High School

Middle schools

- John Deere Middle School
- Wilson Middle School

Combined middle school-high school

- Alternative Student Programming for Individualized and Remote Education (ASPIRE)

Elementary schools

- Jane Addams Elementary
- Bicentennial Elementary
- Butterworth Elementary
- Franklin Elementary
- Hamilton Elementary
- Lincoln-Irving Elementary
- Logan Elementary
- Roosevelt Elementary
- Washington Elementary
- Willard Elementary

Pre-school

- Jefferson Early Learning Center
