= Donald A. Henss =

American lawyer and politician

Donald Allen Henss (December 24, 1930 – June 12, 2010) was an American lawyer and politician.

Henss was born in Moline, Illinois and went to the Moline public schools. He received his bachelor's degree from University of Illinois and his Juris Doctor degree from the University of Illinois College of Law. Henss was admitted to the Illinois bar and practiced law in Moline. Henss served in the Illinois House of Representatives from 1967 to 1972 and was a Republican. Henss then served on the Illinois Pollution Control board from 1972 to 1975. Henss also served as deputy university counsel for the University of Illinois. In 1997, Henss and his wife moved to Colorado Springs, Colorado. He died at a hospital in Colorado Springs, Colorado.
