= LeClaire Hotel =

- U.S. National Register of Historic Places
- Moline Historic Landmark
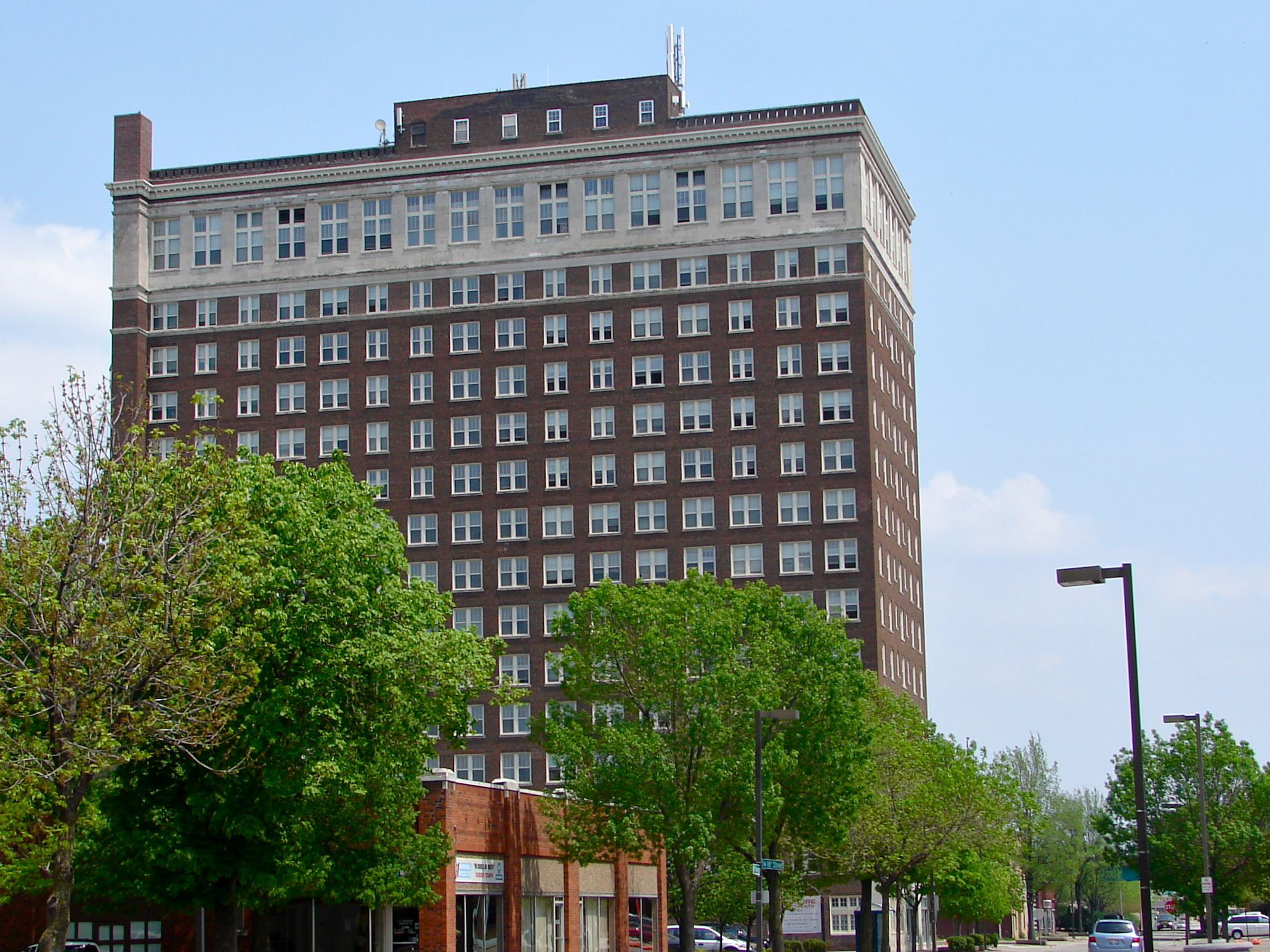

- Location within Illinois Location within the United States
- Location: Jct. of 19th St. and 5th Ave., Moline, Illinois
- Coordinates: 41°30′31″N 90°30′41″W
- Area: less than one acre
- Built: 1921-1922
- Architect: Kirsch & Kolb
- Architectural style: Early Commercial
- NRHP reference No.: 94000025

Significant dates
- Added to NRHP: February 4, 1994
- Designated MHL: October, 1993

LeClaire Hotel is a historic building located in downtown Moline, Illinois, United States. It was named a Moline Historic Landmark in 1993, and it was listed on the National Register of Historic Places in 1994. The building now houses apartments and is known as the LeClaire Apartments.

== History ==
The building was built in 1921-1922 on the east side of downtown Moline. At the time it was built it was the tallest building in what today is known as the Quad Cities. It is named after Antoine LeClaire, a US Army interpreter who served at the treaty signing ceremony that ended the Black Hawk War. He and his wife, the daughter of a Sauk chief, were significant landowners in the area. Most of their property was just across the Mississippi River in Iowa, but they also owned land that became the original plat for the city of Moline.

The LeClaire Hotel was a luxury hotel that hosted celebrities, including Jack Benny (in May 1950), and US presidents, including John F. Kennedy and Ronald Reagan. There was a ballroom on the fifteenth floor called the Top Hat that hosted tea dances that were accompanied by a big band orchestra. The hotel closed in the mid-1980s and sat for ten years without an owner. The Alexander Company bought the property and conducted extensive renovations from 1995-1996 to convert the building into an apartment building. Monarch Investment and Management Group bought the property from Kimberly Clarke in 2015 and they plan to make all the units market-rate apartments as the affordable units become available.

== Architecture ==
The 15-story building is 168 feet (51 m) tall, and is supported by a reinforced concrete superstructure. The exterior is covered in brick, with stone covering the ground floor and the mezzanine. It features a symmetrical façade, a rounded arch entry flanked by rounded arch windows, belt courses, and deep projecting eaves with bracketing. The interior features elements such as the wood-paneled pier supports, checkerboard patterned flooring, mezzanine stairway marble treads, newel posts, rails, and balustrade ironwork. The beamed ceiling and pilaster ornamental motifs were executed by St. Louis artisan Fedrico Aquadro.
