= Wallace M. Rogerson =

Wallace Matthew Rogerson (1880 – 1943) was the president of the Wallace Institute of Chicago. He was an early 20th-century era exercise leader and record producer of "Wallace Records."

== Biography ==
Rogerson was born in Moline Rock, Illinois on November 29, 1880. He made exercise records for the phonograph like "Get Thin to Music," and presaged the work of Jack LaLanne. Wallace Rogerson founded the Wallace Institute around the turn of the 20th century and offered in-person physical training and developed Wallace Records, or Wallace Reducing Records. For many years he conducted the WGN programme Keep Fit to Music. A 09/06/2011 PBS "History Detectives" broadcast found that Wallace Records preceded a competitor (named Walter Camp) in marketing records for (largely women's) exercising for weight reduction. Rogerson died on February 24, 1943, in Chicago, Illinois

Rogerson's Wallace Institute is not to be confused with another Wallace Institute, which ceased operating September 1, 2002.

== Wallace Reducing Records ==
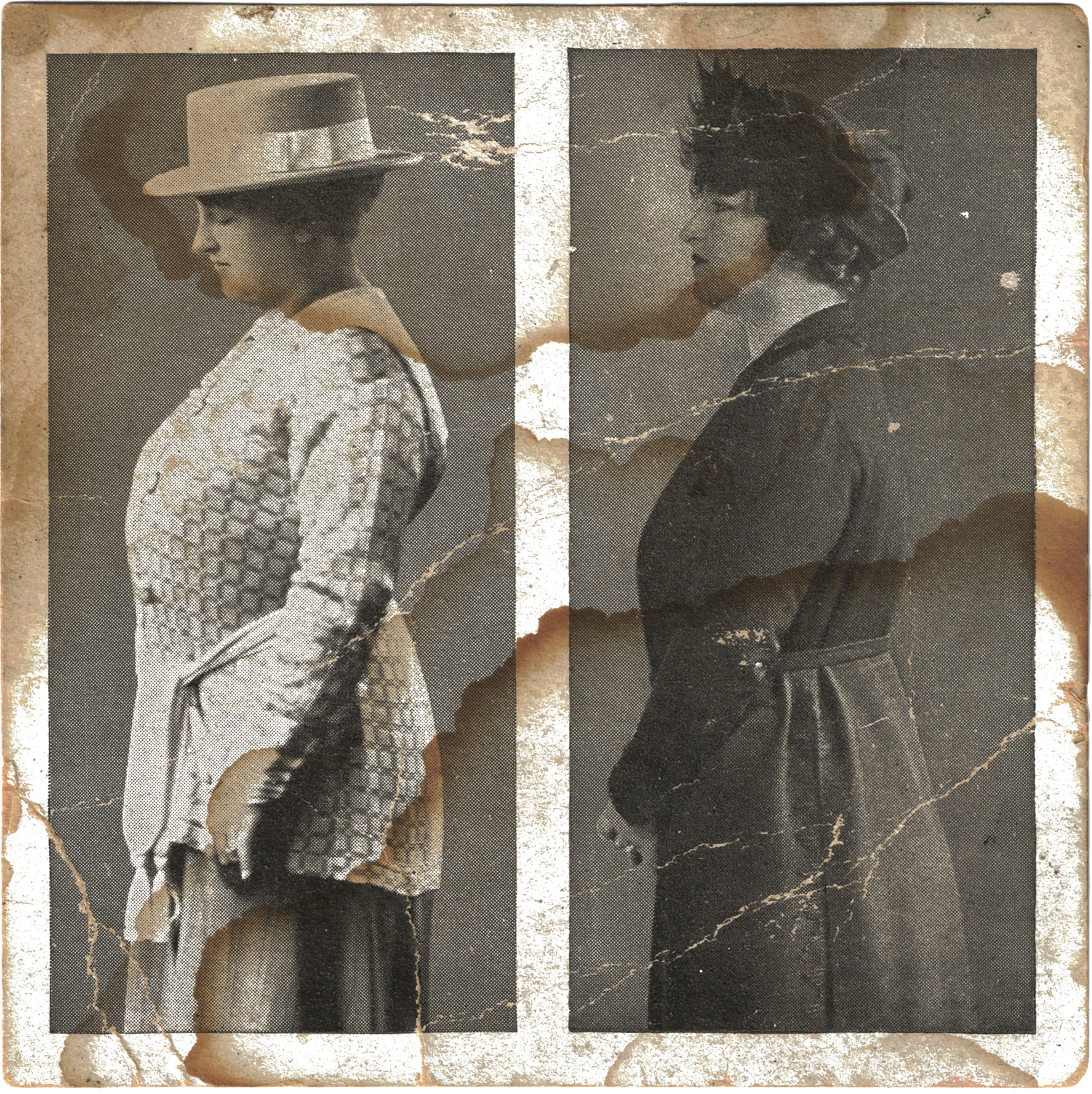
Advertising card for Wallace (Reducing) Records, originally released in 1920.

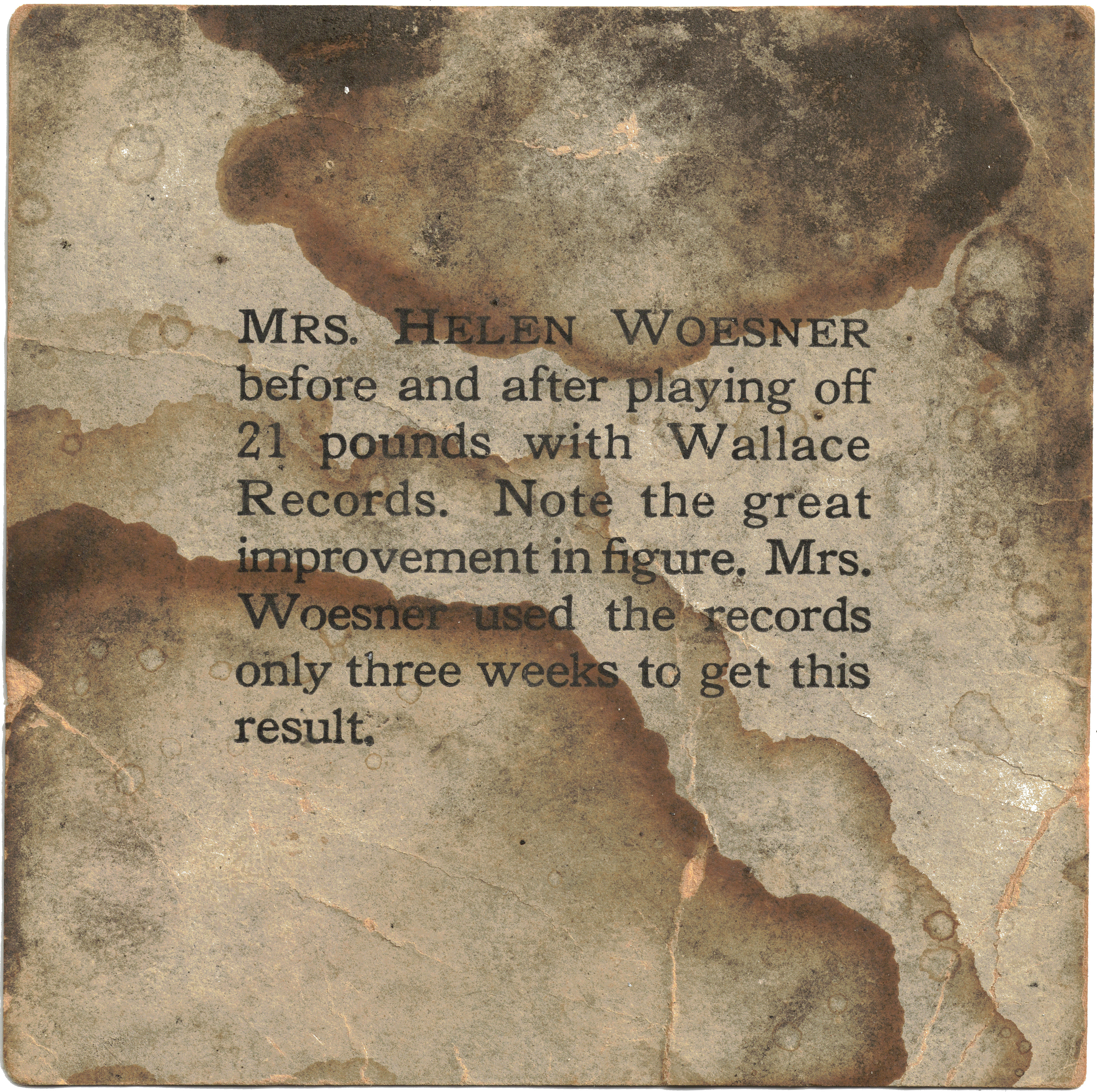
The reverse side of "Wallace Records advertising card - front" detailing the proposed use of the records for weight loss.

Founded in Chicago in 1918, the Wallace Institute was "dedicated to physical fitness and weight loss.". These were the first exercise records marketed in the United States. There were 5 or more records providing exercise regimes in verbal lessons and music recorded by Wallace Rogerson and targeted mostly to women.

== See also ==
- Walter Camp
