= Moline Downtown Commercial Historic District =

Historic district in Illinois, United States

- U.S. National Register of Historic Places
- U.S. Historic district
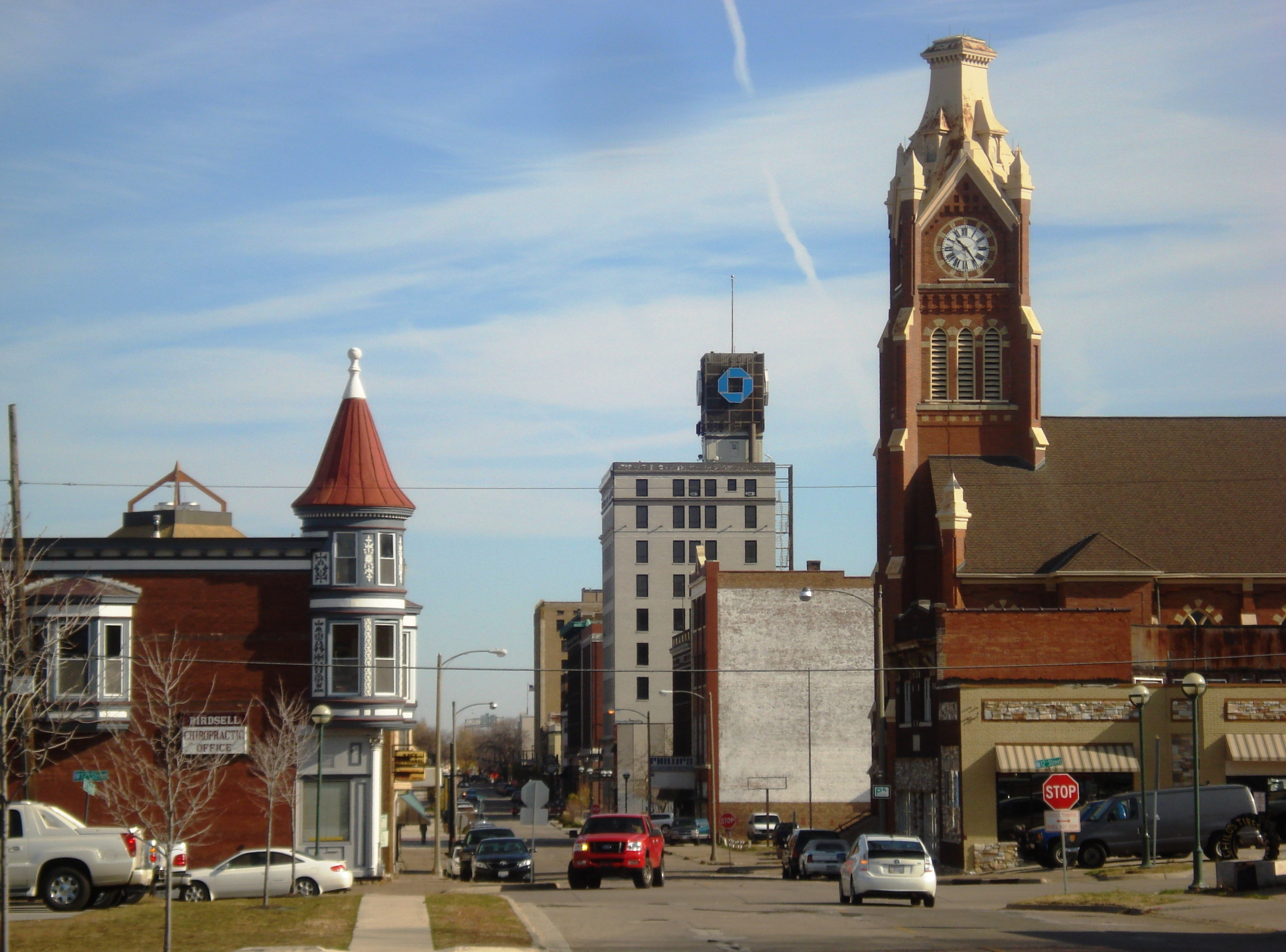
- Downtown Moline from the west with First Lutheran Church on the right.

- Location within Illinois Location within the United States
- Location: Roughly bounded by 12th St. to 18th St., 4th Ave. to 7th Ave., Moline, Illinois
- Coordinates: 41°30′25″N 90°30′55″W
- Area: 33-acre (0.13 km^{2})
- Architectural style: Late 19th and early 20th Century Revivals
- NRHP reference No.: 07000856
- Added to NRHP: August 30, 2007

The Moline Downtown Commercial Historic District is a nationally recognized historic district located in Moline, Illinois, United States. Centered on 5th Avenue, it is roughly bounded by 12th Street to 18th Street, 4th Avenue to 7th Avenue. The distinct covers 33-acre (0.13 km^{2}) and includes 114 buildings. One hundred of the buildings contribute to the significance of the district because they retain their historic and architectural integrity and reflect the character of the historic downtown.

== History ==
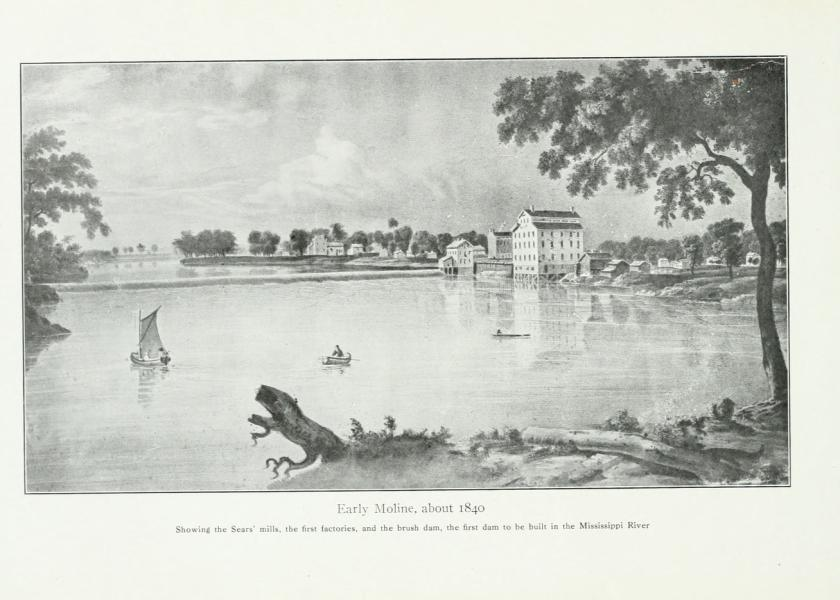
Moline c. 1840

The city of Moline traces its beginnings to the arrival of David B. Sears from Cairo, Illinois in 1836. He established a brush and stone mill in 1838 in what was an unincorporated area known as Rock Island Mills. Other mills were opened in the area that did everything from grinding corn and wheat to processing logs into lumber. John Deere opened his first factory along the Mississippi River in 1847, as part of a partnership, Deere, Tate, and Gould. The partnership would dissolve in 1852 and become Deere & Company. The name of the area was changed to Moline, an adaptation of the French word for "milltown." Moline was incorporated into a town on April 21, 1848.

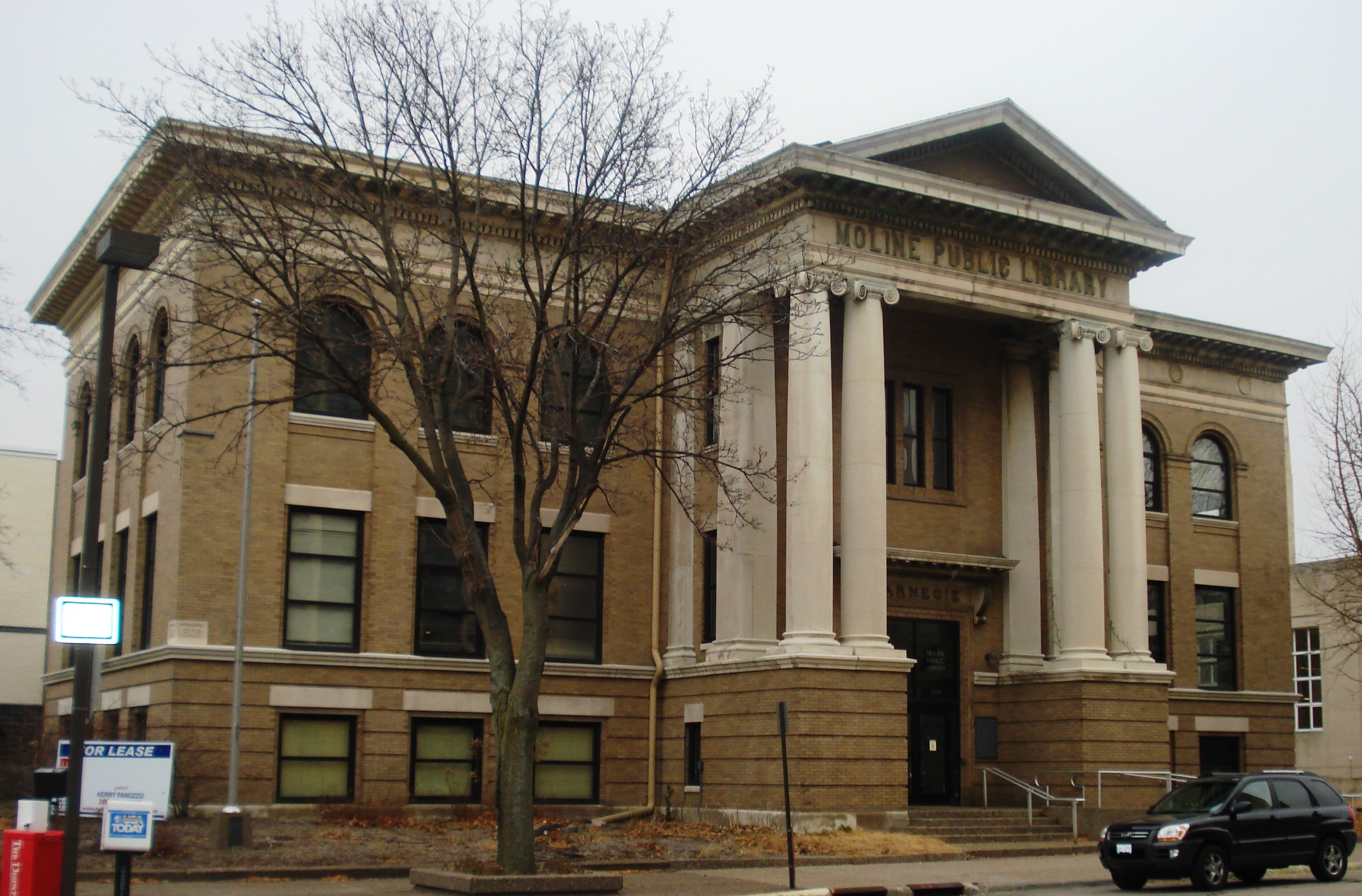
Moline Carnegie Library

Moline's downtown commercial district initially developed along Third Avenue between Fifteenth and Eighteenth Streets. It was close to the factories and mills that lined the river. Most of the buildings were two and three stories, built of brick in the Italianate style. It was separated from the rest of the city by railroad tracks. The first train passed through Moline's commercial district in February 1854. By 1895 there were 75 trains a day on the tracks and it made it difficult for residents to reach the main business district.

By the turn of the 20th century, businesses started to relocate south of the tracks. Initially, they chose locations along 15th Street, which had a trolley line that climbed the hill to the city's newer residential districts. In the 1910s several large commercial buildings were built along Fifth Avenue, which became the main artery in the downtown business district. Sixth Avenue became a secondary artery through the area. A significant loss to the area were several stately homes that lined the avenues.

By the 1920s the downtown area featured bank buildings that contained office space on multiple floors above the main banking rooms on the first floor, as well as other office buildings. These buildings provided a variety of professional services. Two of the buildings were eight stories tall, the Fifth Avenue Building and a building that is now houses Chase Bank. The LeClaire Hotel, which opened in 1922, anchored the east side of the downtown area. On the west side of downtown is the imposing First Lutheran Church, which was built in 1876. Department stores, first-floor specialty shops, theaters, hotels, restaurants, and bars rounded out the businesses. Institutional structures such as the Carnegie Library (1904), City Hall (1914), Elks Club (1924), and the Unitarian Church (1928) were also built in the downtown business district.

The downtown historic district continued to be the main business and cultural area for the city into the mid 20th century. The area was also the location for parades and other civic gatherings. By the 1940s auto dealerships and gas stations started to appear along the edges of downtown. Five large department stores were located downtown: Block & Kuhl Company; New York Store, which was demolished in 1990; J. C. Penney; Sears, Roebuck & Company; and Montgomery Ward & Company. In the 1950s and 1960s, storefronts were modified in an attempt to modernize their looks. The department stores closed in the 1970s and 1980s after SouthPark Mall opened in 1974. Since then some of the older buildings in the district have been torn down, but for the most part, the buildings that remain have retained their historical integrity. There has also been significant development along the river, just outside the historic district, after the TaxSlayer Center opened in 1993.

== Architecture ==
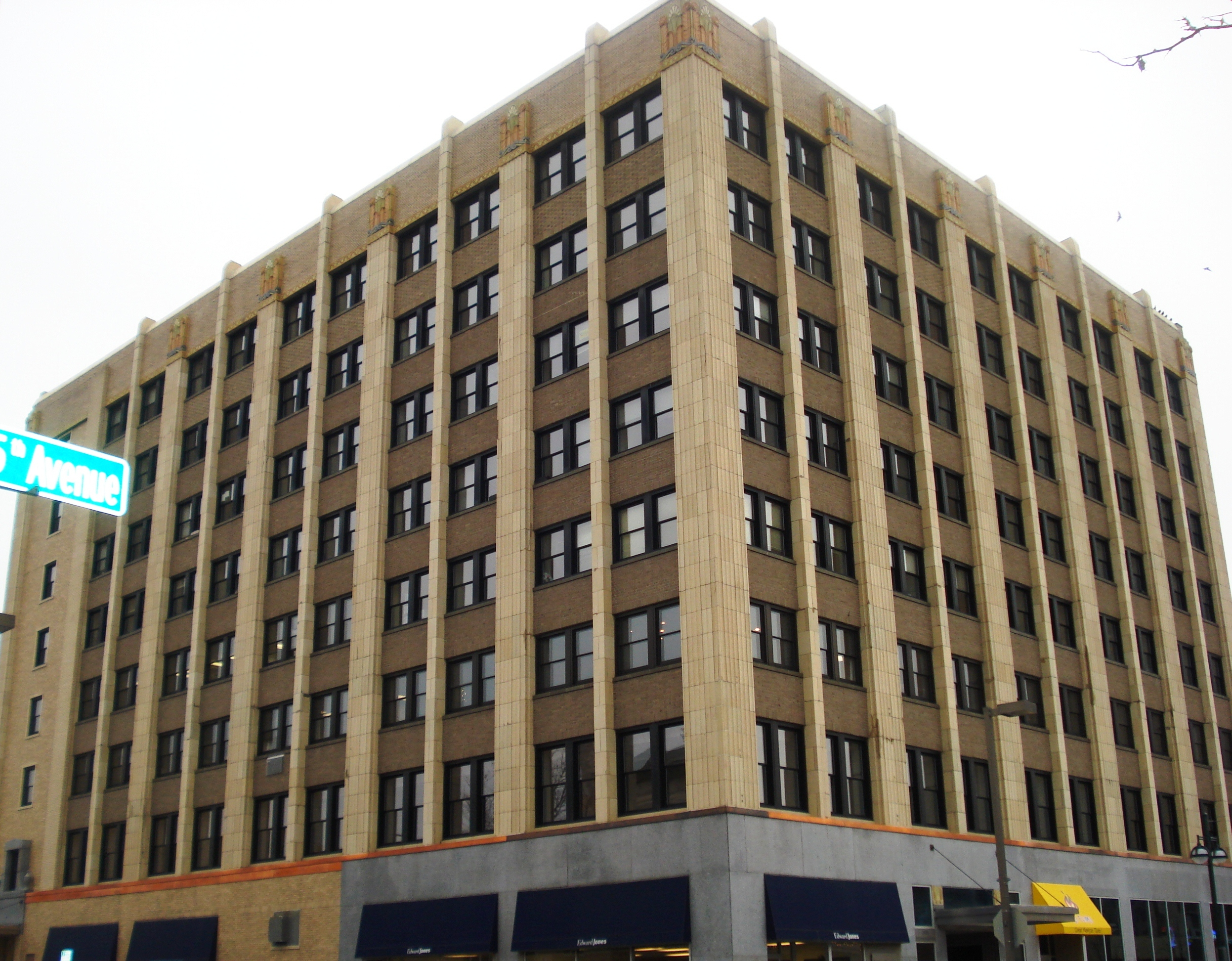
Fifth Avenue Building

The Moline Downtown Commercial Historic District contains numerous architectural building styles, including: Beaux-Arts, Colonial Revival, Neoclassical, Gothic Revival, Tudor Revival, Italian Renaissance, Prairie School, Moderne, Art Deco, Chateauesque, and Commercial. Several prominent local architects designed some of the more significant buildings in the historic district. Olaf Z. Cervin designed the First National Bank Building, now Chase Bank, and the Reliance Block. H. W. Wittsett designed the Moline Commercial Club. William Schultzke has the largest number of historically significant buildings downtown. He designed the Bell Telephone Building, Montgomery Ward, Moline National Bank (now First Midwest Bank), the Fifth Avenue Building, Sohrbecks, Carlson Brothers, Elks Club, and City Hall,
