= Coal Valley, Illinois =

Coal Valley
- Village
- Village of Coal Valley
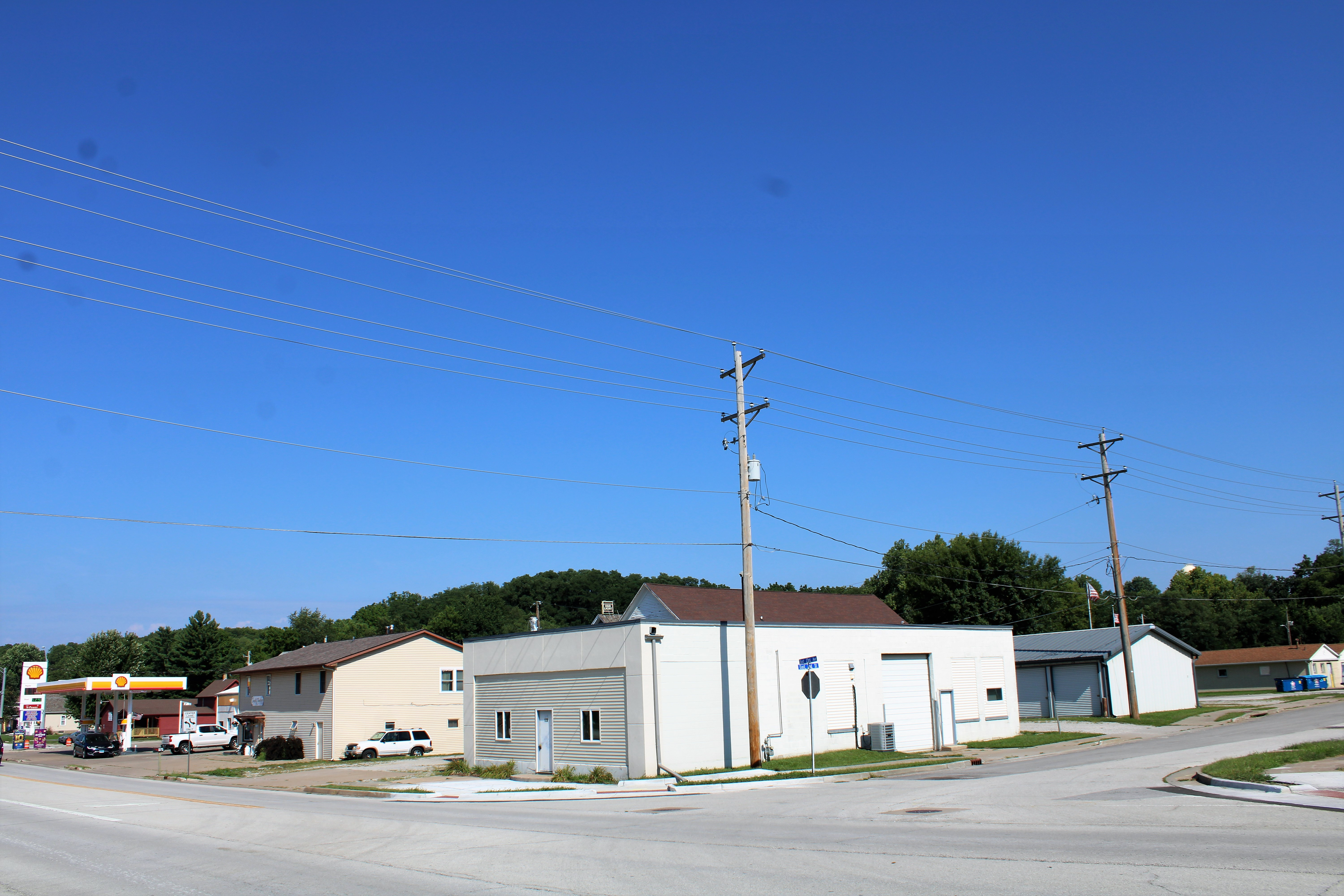
- The historic center of the village along U.S. Route 150

- Location of Coal Valley in Island County, Illinois

- Location of Illinois in the United States
- Coordinates: 41°26′26″N 90°27′32″W
- Country: United States
- State: Illinois
- Counties: Rock Island, Henry
- Founded: 1856

Area
  - Village: 3.17 sq mi (8.20 km^{2})
  - Land: 3.17 sq mi (8.20 km^{2})
  - Water: 0 sq mi (0.00 km^{2})
- Elevation: 653 ft (199 m)

Population (2020)
  - Village: 3,873
  - Density: 1,223.2/sq mi (472.28/km^{2})
  - Metro: 382,630
- Time zone: UTC-6 (CST)
  - Summer (DST): UTC-5 (CDT)
- ZIP Code(s): 61240
- Area code: 309
- FIPS code: 17-15235
- GNIS feature ID: 2398588
- Website: www.coalvalleyil.org

The village of Coal Valley is located in both Rock Island County and Henry County in the U.S. state of Illinois. The population was 3,873 at the time of the 2020 census, up from 3,743 at the 2010 census. It is mostly residential, housing families who work in or out of the greater Quad Cities Area and is considered a suburb. The students of the Rock Island County part of Coal Valley attend the Moline-Coal Valley School District, and in the Henry County portion, Orion Community Unit School District 223

Oakwood Country Club, located in Coal Valley, was host of the Hardee's Golf Classic from 1986 through 1994. The tournament was later renamed to "John Deere Classic" once sponsorship was taken over by Deere & Company. The tournament is now hosted at the TPC at Deere Run course in Silvis, Illinois.

== History ==
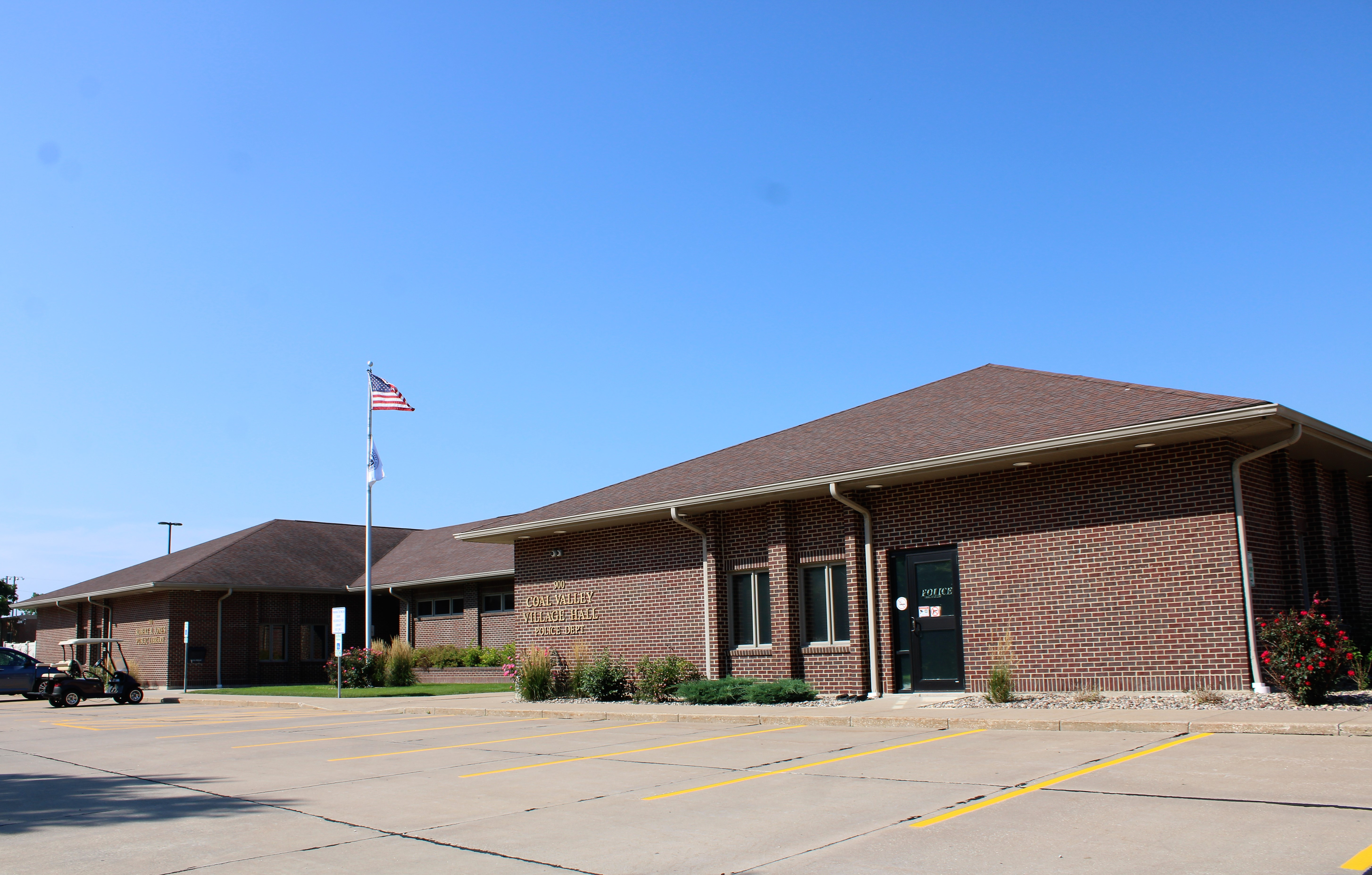
Coal Valley Municipal Center

The first settlers in Coal Valley were trappers and farmers who came from Wales, England, Ireland, Germany and Sweden. The pioneer settlers of the community are thought to have been William and Charles Bailey who built the first house within the present village limits. It is also believed that they operated a small mine, which could have been the first discovery of coal in the vicinity.

The Coal Valley Mining Company was formed in 1856. The men who incorporated the company were Holmes Hakes, Charles Buford, S. S. Guyer, Ben Harper and N. B. Buford. They gave the community its name. The booming years for coal mining in Coal Valley were from the 1850s to about the middle of the 1870s. Over the years other mining companies moved in. 1942 saw the end of coal mining in and around the community.

In March 1876, a vote was taken and passed to form the Village of Coal Valley. On April 22, 1876, the first Board of Trustees was made. On April 22, 1876, H. B. Sudlow was chosen president and Harvey Clark was appointed the first Constable.

In May 1892, a petition was signed by twenty-eight citizens of Coal Valley, asking that a town hall be erected. The lots needed for the building site were purchased from Gustave Krapp Sr. Mr. Johnson of Orion was contracted to erect the building. The hall was built identically to Orion's town hall. Work began in September and by Thanksgiving the building was up. In January 1893, the hall was officially accepted. The total cost was under $3,000.

In April 1900, the Village Board purchased a fire engine and hose cart for the sum of $875. In November 1900, the Village Board purchased the land and built a one-story fire station.

In 1929, the construction of Highway 150 was completed through the Village, and in 1933, it was extended as far east as Orion.

In 1939, the Coal Valley High School was built at the cost of $70,000 and that fall forty-six pupils were enrolled. The Coal Valley High School was dissolved in 1952 and used as the junior high, and high school students attended the new high school in Moline.

== Geography ==
According to the 2021 census gazetteer files, Coal Valley has a total area of 3.17 square miles (8.21 km^{2}), all land.

== Demographics ==
Historical population
Census	Pop.	Note	%±
1880	311		—
1890	207		−33.4%
1900	259		25.1%
1910	190		−26.6%
1920	184		−3.2%
1930	306		66.3%
1940	243		−20.6%
1950	363		49.4%
1960	435		19.8%
1970	3,088		609.9%
1980	3,800		23.1%
1990	2,683		−29.4%
2000	3,606		34.4%
2010	3,743		3.8%
2020	3,873		3.5%

=== Racial and ethnic composition ===
Coal Valley village, Illinois – Racial and ethnic composition Note: the US Census treats Hispanic/Latino as an ethnic category. This table excludes Latinos from the racial categories and assigns them to a separate category. Hispanics/Latinos may be of any race.
Race / Ethnicity (NH = Non-Hispanic)	Pop 2000	Pop 2010	Pop 2020	% 2000	% 2010	% 2020
White alone (NH)	1,468	3,469	3,411	86.92%	92.68%	88.07%
Black or African American alone (NH)	75	33	35	4.44%	0.88%	0.90%
Native American or Alaska Native alone (NH)	5	6	4	0.30%	0.16%	0.10%
Asian alone (NH)	8	49	30	0.47%	1.31%	0.77%
Native Hawaiian or Pacific Islander alone (NH)	0	0	2	0.00%	0.00%	0.05%
Other race alone (NH)	0	7	8	0.00%	0.19%	0.21%
Mixed race or Multiracial (NH)	35	49	137	2.07%	1.31%	3.54%
Hispanic or Latino (any race)	98	130	246	5.80%	3.47%	6.35%
Total	1,689	3,743	3,873	100.00%	100.00%	100.00%

=== 2020 census ===
As of the 2020 census, there were 3,873 people in Coal Valley. The population density was 1,223.31 inhabitants per square mile (472.32/km^{2}). The median age was 44.0 years. 21.8% of residents were under age 18, and 20.0% were age 65 or older. For every 100 females, there were 98.7 males; for every 100 females age 18 and over, there were 97.8 males age 18 and over.

There were 1,548 households, of which 31.7% had children under age 18 living in them. Of all households, 59.6% were married-couple households, 14.5% had a male householder with no spouse or partner present, and 19.2% had a female householder with no spouse or partner present. About 21.6% of households were made up of individuals, and 9.9% had someone living alone who was age 65 or older.

There were 1,651 housing units at an average density of 521.48 per square mile (201.34/km^{2}), of which 6.2% were vacant. The homeowner vacancy rate was 2.4%, and the rental vacancy rate was 7.7%.

93.6% of residents lived in urban areas, while 6.4% lived in rural areas.

=== Income and poverty ===
The median income for a household in the village was $73,472, and the median income for a family was $88,594. Males had a median income of $55,590 versus $33,858 for females. The per capita income for the village was $41,944. About 2.4% of families and 2.9% of the population were below the poverty line, including none of those under age 18 and 5.6% of those age 65 or over.

== Education ==
The Rock Island County portion is within the Moline-Coal Valley School District 40. The comprehensive high school of the district is Moline High School.

The Henry County portion is in the Orion Community Unit School District 223.
