= Milan, Illinois =

Milan
- Village
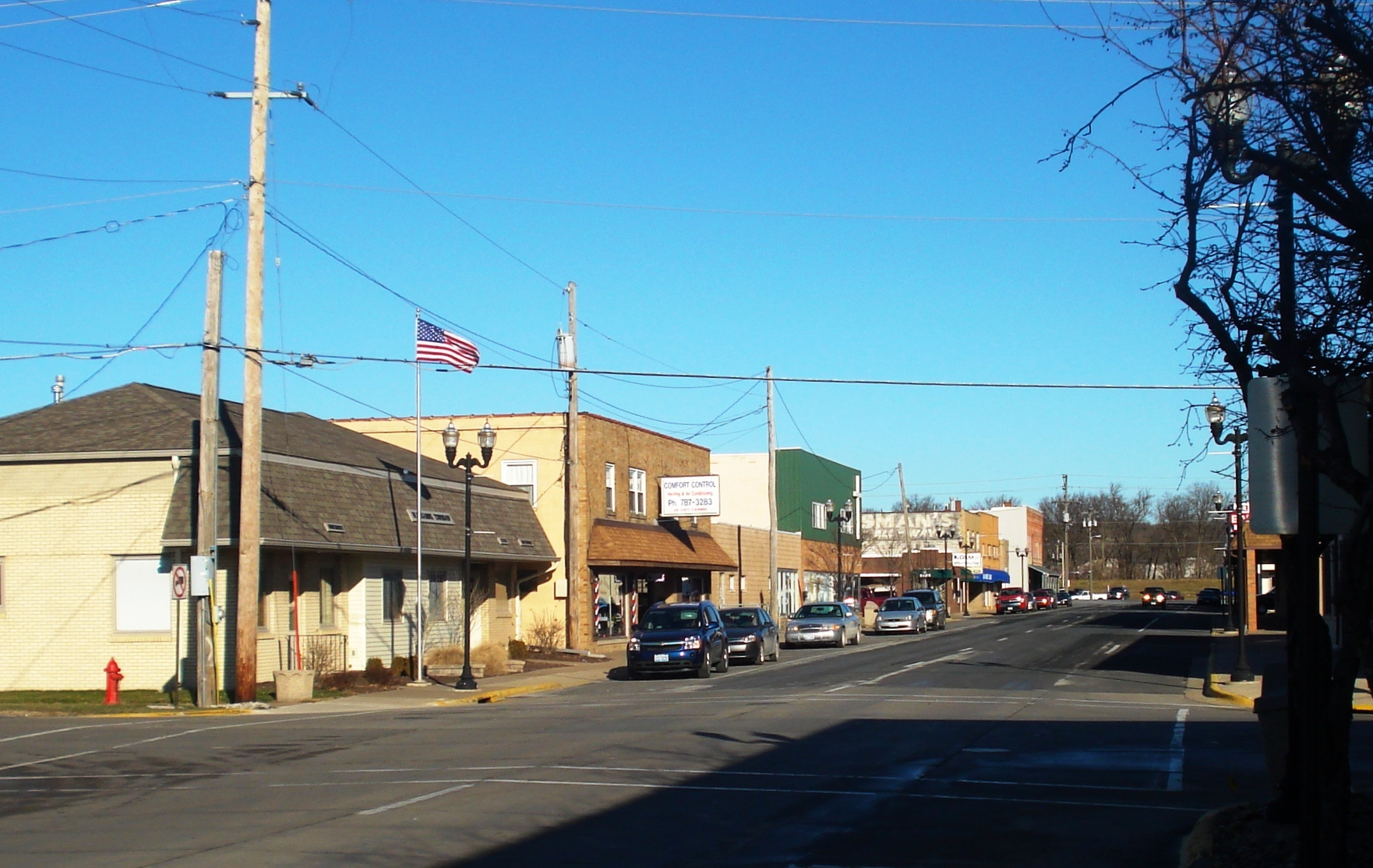
- West side of 4th Street West

- Location of Milan in Rock Island County, Illinois.

- Location of Illinois in the United States
- Coordinates: 41°26′30″N 90°33′34″W
- Country: United States
- State: Illinois
- County: Rock Island

Area
  - Total: 6.85 sq mi (17.74 km^{2})
  - Land: 6.25 sq mi (16.20 km^{2})
  - Water: 0.59 sq mi (1.54 km^{2})
- Elevation: 597 ft (182 m)

Population (2020)
  - Total: 5,097
  - Density: 814.9/sq mi (314.62/km^{2})
- Time zone: UTC-6 (CST)
  - Summer (DST): UTC-5 (CDT)
- ZIP code: 61264
- Area code: 309
- FIPS code: 17-49009
- GNIS feature ID: 2399342
- Website: www.milanil.org

Milan (/ˈmaɪlɪn/ MY-lin) is a village in Rock Island County, Illinois, United States. The population was 5,097 at the time of the 2020 census; down from 5,099 at the 2010 census.

The village is located adjacent to the Quad Cities of Illinois and Iowa.

== History ==
The village is on the Rock River in northwest Illinois, about 4 miles upstream of its outlet to the Mississippi. The village is the site of the south campsites which comprised the Sauk and Fox village of Saukenuk, once the second-largest Native American inhabitation in North America.

Originally platted along the right-of-way for the Hennepin Canal, in 1837, the village site was called in land speculation papers "Hampton" (not the town in Illinois, approximately 13 miles north-northeast, on the Mississippi River—see Hampton, Illinois for more). "Hampton's" land speculators, George Camden and Franklin Vandruff, sold land along the Rock River, along a north-west flowing creek, which was re-routed north into the Rock's main channel. Along Mill Creek, the industries of wool-carding and (river clamshell) "pearl" button-making helped rename the village by 1841 as Camden Mills.

The village has "sister cities" in Missouri, Tennessee, and Michigan.

== Geography ==
According to the 2010 census, Milan has a total area of 6.463 square miles (16.74 km^{2}), of which 5.87 square miles (15.20 km^{2}) (or 90.82%) is land and 0.593 square miles (1.54 km^{2}) (or 9.18%) is water.

== Demographics ==
Historical population
Census	Pop.	Note	%±
1880	845		—
1890	692		−18.1%
1900	719		3.9%
1910	727		1.1%
1920	850		16.9%
1930	888		4.5%
1940	1,210		36.3%
1950	1,737		43.6%
1960	3,065		76.5%
1970	4,873		59.0%
1980	6,371		30.7%
1990	5,831		−8.5%
2000	5,348		−8.3%
2010	5,099		−4.7%
2020	5,097		0.0%
U.S. Decennial Census

=== Racial and ethnic composition ===
Milan village, Illinois – Racial and ethnic composition Note: the US Census treats Hispanic/Latino as an ethnic category. This table excludes Latinos from the racial categories and assigns them to a separate category. Hispanics/Latinos may be of any race.
Race / Ethnicity (NH = Non-Hispanic)	Pop 2000	Pop 2010	Pop 2020	% 2000	% 2010	% 2020
White alone (NH)	4,866	4,421	4,130	90.99%	86.70%	81.03%
Black or African American alone (NH)	231	253	289	4.32%	4.96%	5.67%
Native American or Alaska Native alone (NH)	12	17	13	0.22%	0.33%	0.26%
Asian alone (NH)	22	40	55	0.41%	0.78%	1.08%
Native Hawaiian or Pacific Islander alone (NH)	2	1	2	0.04%	0.02%	0.04%
Other race alone (NH)	0	1	20	0.00%	0.02%	0.39%
Mixed race or Multiracial (NH)	59	134	273	1.10%	2.63%	5.36%
Hispanic or Latino (any race)	156	232	315	2.92%	4.55%	6.18%
Total	5,348	5,099	5,097	100.00%	100.00%	100.00%

=== 2020 census ===
As of the 2020 census, Milan had a population of 5,097. The median age was 43.5 years. 20.4% of residents were under the age of 18 and 21.6% of residents were 65 years of age or older. For every 100 females there were 90.8 males, and for every 100 females age 18 and over there were 89.5 males age 18 and over.

94.8% of residents lived in urban areas, while 5.2% lived in rural areas.

There were 2,409 households in Milan, of which 24.2% had children under the age of 18 living in them. Of all households, 36.8% were married-couple households, 22.7% were households with a male householder and no spouse or partner present, and 32.0% were households with a female householder and no spouse or partner present. About 38.1% of all households were made up of individuals and 17.7% had someone living alone who was 65 years of age or older.

There were 2,606 housing units, of which 7.6% were vacant. The homeowner vacancy rate was 1.5% and the rental vacancy rate was 9.8%.

=== 2000 census ===
As of the census of 2000, there were 5,348 people, 2,310 households, and 1,457 families residing in the village. The population density was 965.9 inhabitants per square mile (372.9/km^{2}). There were 2,378 housing units at an average density of 429.5 per square mile (165.8/km^{2}). The racial makeup of the village was 92.46% White, 4.32% African American, 0.22% Native American, 0.45% Asian, 0.04% Pacific Islander, 1.08% from other races, and 1.42% from two or more races. Hispanic or Latino of any race were 2.92% of the population.

There were 2,310 households, out of which 28.5% had children under the age of 18 living with them, 45.7% were married couples living together, 13.3% had a female householder with no husband present, and 36.9% were non-families. 31.1% of all households were made up of individuals, and 13.5% had someone living alone who was 65 years of age or older. The average household size was 2.31 and the average family size was 2.88.

In the village, the population was spread out, with 23.3% under the age of 18, 9.6% from 18 to 24, 27.5% from 25 to 44, 24.7% from 45 to 64, and 14.9% who were 65 years of age or older. The median age was 38 years. For every 100 females, there were 93.5 males. For every 100 females age 18 and over, there were 89.2 males.

The median income for a household in the village was $34,556, and the median income for a family was $43,802. Males had a median income of $31,875 versus $22,747 for females. The per capita income for the village was $17,608. About 6.2% of families and 10.7% of the population were below the poverty line, including 13.9% of those under age 18 and 8.6% of those age 65 or over.

== Economy ==
Milan is home to the John Deere North American Parts Distribution Center, one of the largest warehouses in the world.

Before ceasing operations in 2003, Eagle Food Centers was based out of Milan.

== Transportation ==
Quad Cities MetroLINK provides bus service on multiple routes connecting Milan to destinations across the Quad Cities.

== Education ==
The majority of the municipality is in the Rock Island–Milan School District 41. A small piece is in the Sherrard Community Unit School District 200 and another small piece is in the Moline-Coal Valley School District 40.

== Notable people ==
- Ken Bowman, football center with Green Bay Packers
- Therese Anne Fowler, author, television producer
- Joe Frisco, jazz dancer, vaudevillian and comic
- Ethan Happ, Wisconsin Badgers basketball player
- Ralph Fletcher Seymour, book publisher, artist, author
