= Richard Poate Stebbins =

American academic and editor (1913–2011)

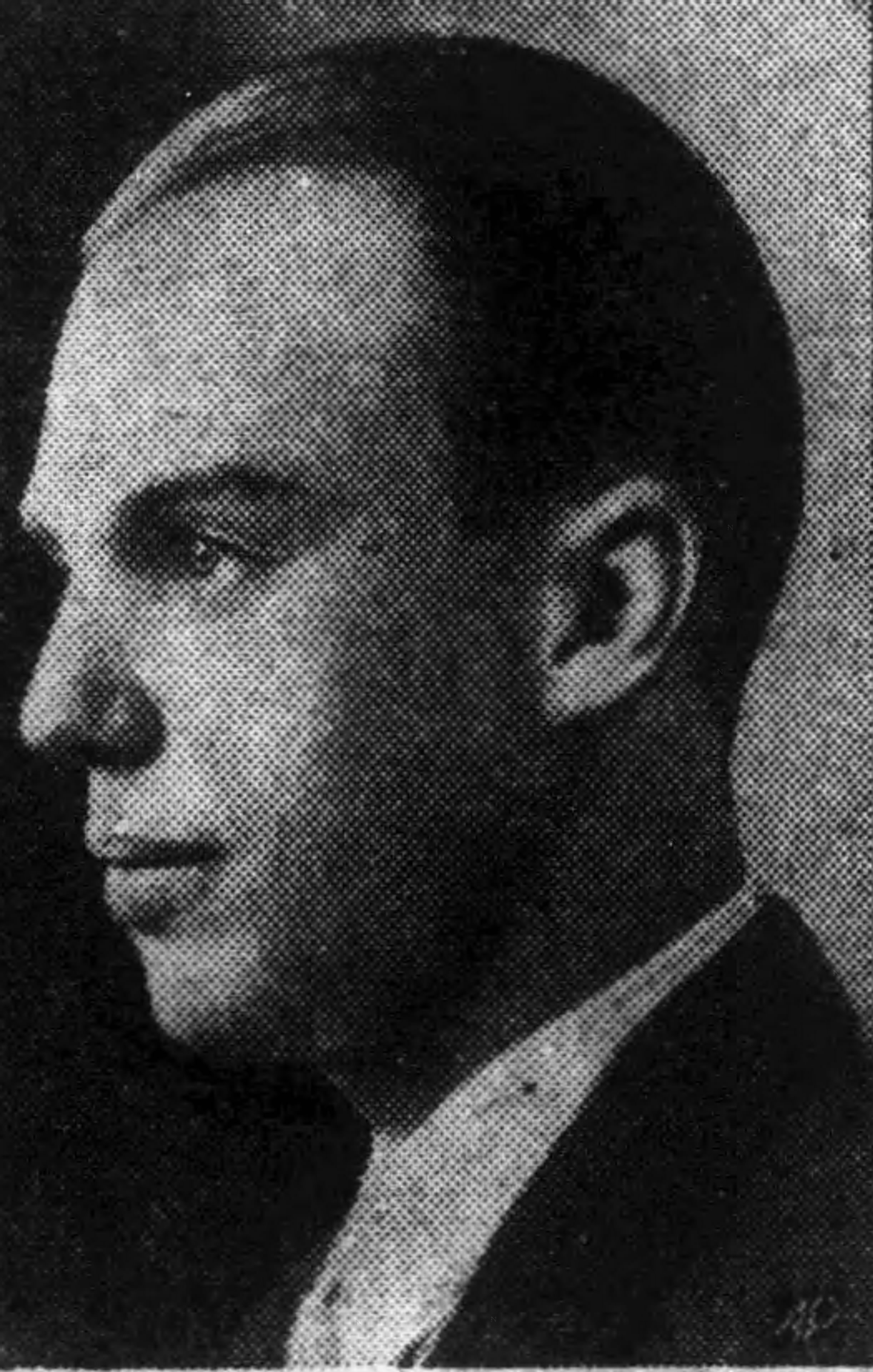
- Stebbins c. 1945
- Born: January 4, 1913; Mount Vernon, New York, U.S.
- Died: February 1, 2011 (aged 98)
- Occupations: Historian; political analyst; editor
- Spouse: Maria-Luise Tripp (m. 1949; died 1987)
- Mother: Lucy Poate Stebbins
- Awards: Guggenheim Fellowship (1945)

Academic background
- Education: Harvard University (BA, MA, PhD)
- Thesis: Italian policy in the eastern Mediterranean, 1911-1914 (1940)

Academic work
- Institutions: Council of Foreign Relations

Richard Poate Stebbins (January 4, 1913 – February 1, 2011) was an American historian, political analyst, and editor. He and his mother Lucy Poate Stebbins co-authored three books - Enchanted Wanderer (1940), Frank Damrosch: Let the People Sing and The Trollopes: The Chronicle of a Writing Family (both 1945). He later worked at the Council on Foreign Relations, where he later edited volumes such as The United States in World Affairs and Documents on American Foreign Relations, and after his retirement published So Hard the Stones (1993) and The Making of Symphony Hall (2000).

== Biography ==
=== Early life and career ===
Stebbins was born on January 4, 1913, in Mount Vernon, New York, the son of Howard L. Stebbins, librarian of the Social Law Library, and Lucy Poate Stebbins, a novelist and non-fiction writer. His maternal grandparents were Baptist missionaries based in Japan, with one from England and the other a Canadian-born American. He was later raised in Newton, Massachusetts. He studied at Harvard University, where he obtained a BA in 1933, an MA in 1935, and a PhD in 1940, and taught at both Harvard and its sister institution Radcliffe College, as well as Northeastern University (where he was an instructor). His doctoral dissertation was titled Italian policy in the eastern Mediterranean, 1911-1914.

In 1938, Stebbins and his mother went to Europe as Oberlaender fellows to work on their Carl Maria von Weber book Enchanted Wanderer, which was released in 1940. The mother-son duo co-authored Frank Damrosch: Let the People Sing and The Trollopes: The Chronicle of a Writing Family (both 1945). That same year, he was awarded a Guggenheim Fellowship "for a historical study of art patronage".

=== Later career and life ===
During World War II, he worked as an intelligence analyst at the Office of Strategic Services. After working as a branch chief at the Department of State from 1945, he joined the Council on Foreign Relations as the annual volume editor in 1949. His multi-volume work in national and global affairs at the CFR, either as author or editor, included The United States in World Affairs (1950-1968) and Documents on American Foreign Relations (1953-1971). In 1962, he became a senior research fellow there, serving until 1978. He also edited Herbert Rosinski's posthumous 1965 book Power and Human Destiny.

Stebbins retired in 1978 and moved to Boston, where he did volunteering in academic research and translation. One of the institutions where he did such work was the Boston Symphony Orchestra, for whom he published The Making of Symphony Hall: A History with Documents, a volume of edited BSO documents, in 2000. He also wrote a biography of his mother's life, So Hard the Stones: Lucy Poate Stebbins and Her Life in Literature, published in 1993.

=== Personal life and death ===
Stebbins married Maria-Luise Tripp in 1949. The couple remained married until her death in 1987. They lived in with historian Herbert Rosinski, a close friend of Stebbins' who was also Tripp's ex-husband.

Stebbins died on February 1, 2011. At the time of his death, he was living in Brookline, Massachusetts.

== Works ==
- (with Lucy Poate Stebbins) Enchanted Wanderer (1940) (Note: Reviews of this book:)
- (ed. with Grayson L. Kirk) War and National Policy: A Syllabus, Farrar & Rinehart (1942)
- (with Lucy Poate Stebbins) Frank Damrosch: Let the People Sing (1945) (Note: Reviews of this book:)
- (with Lucy Poate Stebbins) The Trollopes: The Chronicle of a Writing Family (1945)
- (ed.; by Herbert Rosinski) Power and Human Destiny (1965) (Note: Reviews of this book:)
- (ed. with Alba Amoia) Political Handbook and Atlas of the World (1970)
- The Career of Herbert Rosinski: An Intellectual Pilgrimage (1989)
- (ed.) The Japan Experience: The Missionary Letters of Belle Marsh Poate and Thomas Pratt Poate, 1876-1892 (1992)
- So Hard the Stones: Lucy Poate Stebbins and Her Life in Literature (1993)
- The Making of Symphony Hall, Boston: A History with Documents (2000) (Note: Reviews of this book:)

=== Multi-volume ===
- The United States in World Affairs (1950-1968)
- (ed.) Documents on American Foreign Relations (1953-1971)
- (ed.) The World This Year (1971-1973)
- (ed.; with Elaine P. Adam) American Foreign Relations: A Documentary Record (1975-1977)
