= Caliban by the Yellow Sands =

1916 play by Percy MacKaye

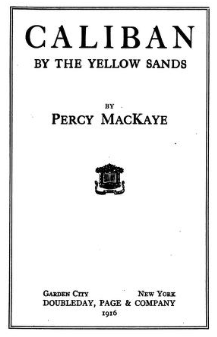
- Author: Percy MacKaye
- Published: 1916

Caliban by the Yellow Sands is a play by Percy MacKaye, published in 1916.

== Production information ==
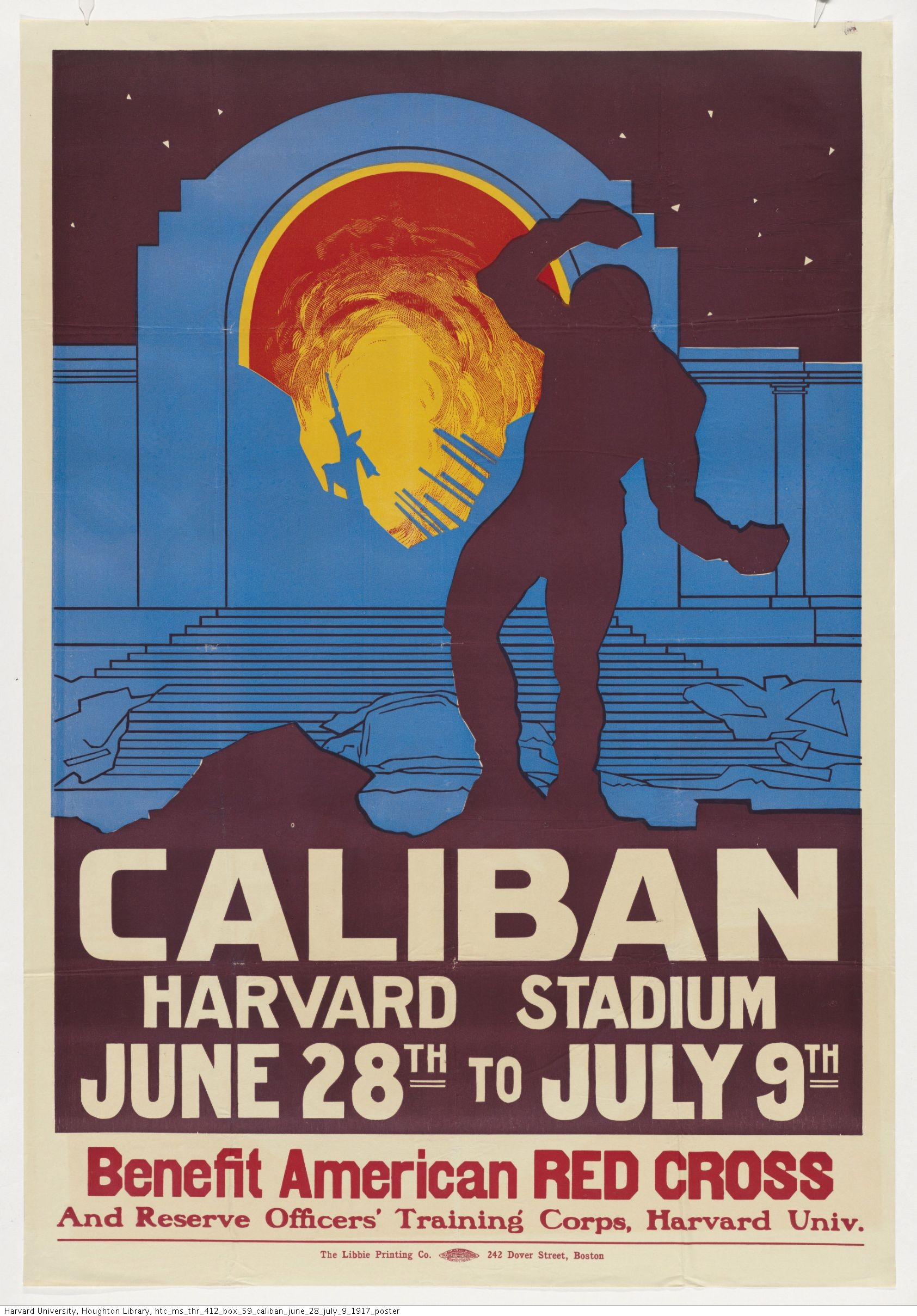
Poster for Caliban at Harvard Stadium June 28 to July 9 [1917].

MacKaye devised this piece in celebration for the 300th anniversary of Shakespeare's death.

== Background ==
MacKaye's first technical opportunity to experiment in devising a dramatic structure of Caliban's requirements was in St. Louis in 1914. Seven thousand citizens took part in MacKaye's civic masque, a historical pageant celebrating the 150th anniversary of the city's founding.

== New York production (1916) ==
After the civic masque in St Louis, MacKaye began to look to Central Park for an appropriate site to produce the community festival. The idea was to now have his Masque as the central popular piece in the festival, along with the hundreds of other Shakespearean celebrations. However, there were far too many people who opposed this idea of using Central Park and did not think that it was an appropriate setting for the production. This debate ended in the disapproval of the use of Central Park, which MacKaye was very disappointed about. He strongly believed that the ones who were against the idea were simply unaware of the impact and significance the initial production had on the citizens of St. Louis, and the potential affect it could have on the citizens of New York City. He finally received approval to produce the play in New York two years later, at the Lewisohn Stadium. The New York production had an audience of 20,000 a night, with 2,000-3,000 people actually performing. Although still high in number, MacKaye desired more of what had been produced in St. Louis and longed to grow the piece in New York just as rapidly. The total audience of 135,000 covered the costs of around $100,000. However attempts to turn the enthusiasm for the production by having an annual event came to nothing with the US entry into the First World War. MacKaye's desire to expand the Masque was rooted in his vision for mankind, upon which the play as a whole was based. Thus the piece was promoted as a "Community Masque".

== Boston production (1917) ==
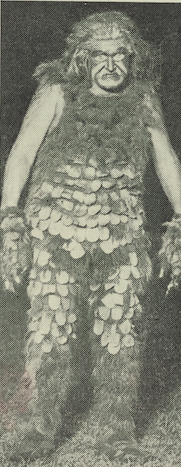
Lionel Braham in the role of Caliban

The Community Masque was re-staged in Boston's Harvard Stadium in July 1917. The promoters published Caliban News to try to maintain the staging of the masque as an ongoing event for the summer. They depicted this as a patriotic activity embodying the Spirit of 1917.

== Play information ==
The play is loosely based on Shakespeare's play The Tempest, and centers on the character Caliban, the monster son of Sycorax, and his desire for knowledge. The passage taken from The Tempest, which is the inspiration for the masque, is when Prospero says,

It was mine art
When I arrived and heard thee, that made gape
The pine and let thee out. (I.i.)

The character of Caliban is meant to represent the "passionate child-curious part of us all": Caliban is depicted as a much more primitive character than Prospero or Ariel, in his pursuit of the art of Prospero. These are not meant to be direct characters from Shakespeare's play but rather symbolic representations of what these characters mean in the context of his play. MacKaye was less worried about telling the journey of these characters in a story rather than present to the audience a piece of poetry meant to resonate with them on a deeper level. The play is constructed in a way which includes scenes concerning Caliban's story as well as anachronistic vignette-like scenes which take place in a separate performance area. A scene could occur between Caliban and Miranda and then immediately switch to a scene between Brutus and Lucius.

== Play's literature ==
The language used by MacKaye is only one of many elements in the work meant to cultivate the idea he is trying to present. "If no word of the Masque be heard by the audience, the plot, action, and symbolism will still remain understandable". The symbolic structure to include pageantry, poetry, and dance in one play is MacKaye's attempt at forming a new genre of theatre meant to affect the masses of people who saw his performances. In his first production of Caliban by the Yellow Sands in St. Louis, his emphasis was on making all the elements of the theatre work synchronously. No single aspect of the Masque was meant to overpower another. The technical would work with the artistic and even the different artistic styles, which included elements of opera, song, dance, and various other performance styles, worked in one cohesive unit. While spectacle was a large part of the production, the poetry and literature were equally as important. Mackaye worked with a number of activists from New York's various linguistic communities; the socialist labor leader and poet Arturo Giovannitti translated the play into Italian.

== MacKaye's ideology ==
Caliban was meant to bring together a community not just civically but also intellectually. Mackaye's theoretical views could be seen in his concept of "Civic Theatre" which outlined before Caliban by the Yellow Sands was conceived. MacKaye's Civic Theater was one which, "resembles the harmonious mind of a man whose splendid passions and imaginations are controlled and directed by his enlightened reason to the service of his race". His conception of theatre was not commercial but rather an artistic aspiration to enhance public morality. Caliban achieves this thought in the sense of the story MacKaye tries to tell. He presents the journey of mankind and its quest for art. It is a simple enough idea with many implications and interpretations making the audience a necessity. With an audience numbering in the hundreds of thousands, the conversations stirring around Caliban by the Yellow Sands would lead to debate, agreement, and mass intelligent thought accomplishing his goal of unifying a community.

== Critical commentary ==
Thomas Cartelli has characterised MacKaye's depiction of the struggle between Prospero and Caliban as being reductively displayed as a manichean struggle between dark and light. He suggests that the scenes interposed from other works of Shakespeare are those least linked to social and political issues, rather focusing on unproblematic scenes from the romantic tragedies and festive comedies. The "Community Masque" places MacKaye in the position which he dramatises as that of Prospero/Shakespeare, who uses the theatre to uplift Caliban from the material world of Setebos. Cartelli discusses the implications this has in the context of Jewish immigration to New York and suggests that Mackaye is asserting the values of White Anglo-Saxon Protestantism in a way comparable to Senator Albert Beveridge's concerns raised at the turn of the century. Cartelli thus considers MacKaye's work as an example of neocolonialism, which asserts Shakespeare as providing the peak experience of western civilisation.

Florence Ripley Mastin wrote a poem after Caliban by the Yellow Sands:

The audience itself is Caliban!

Monstrous and murmuring beneath the stars

It sees slim Beauty pass, and Poetry!

And hears the thrilling voice of Song.

So croutched.

Profoundly moved yet inarticulate....

— Florence Ripley Mastin, Caliban in the Stadium
