= Spirit of 1914 =

War enthusiasm of some Germans at the start of WW1

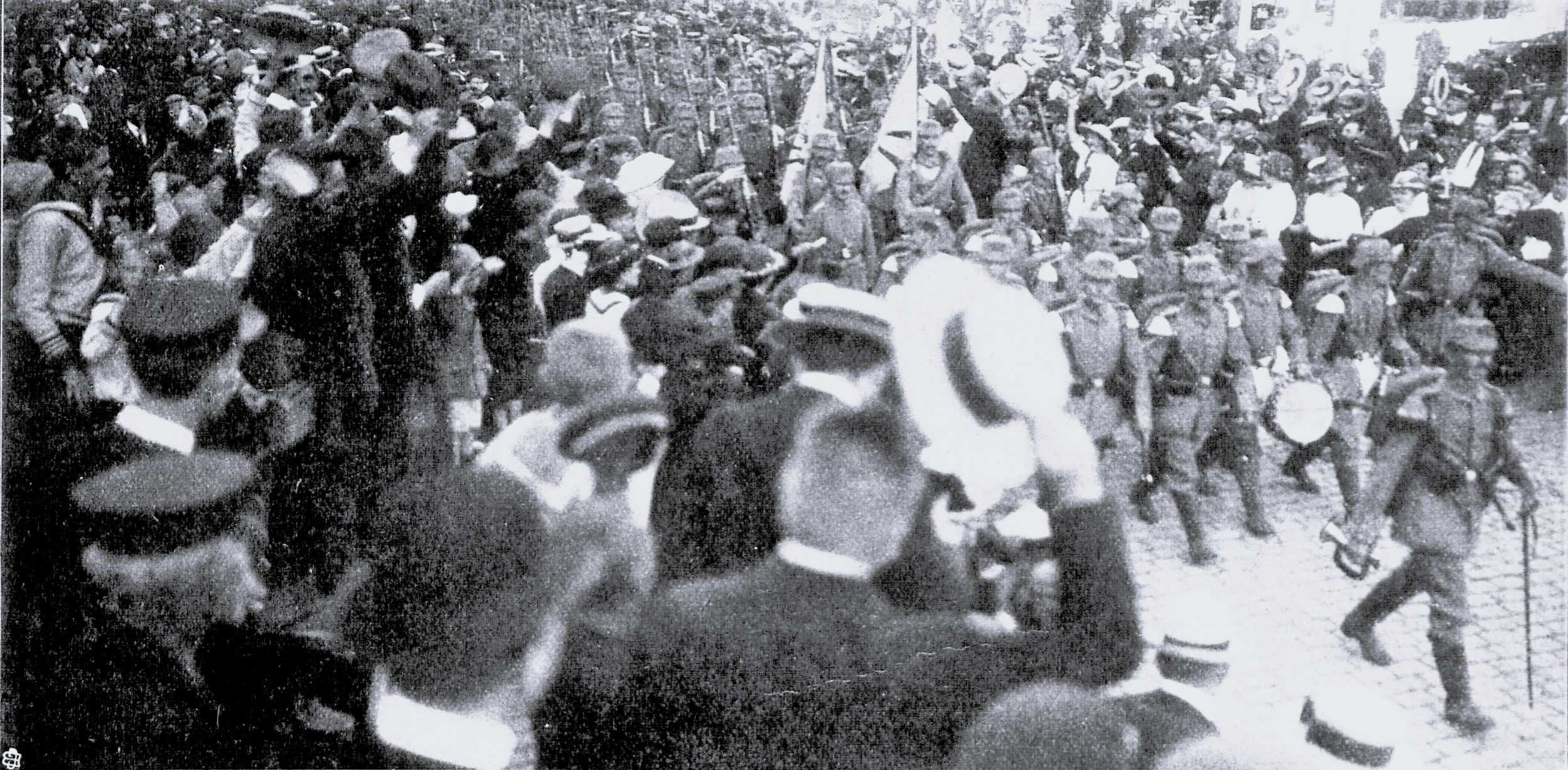
An enthusiastic crowd cheers soldiers after their mobilisation in Lübeck in 1914.

The Spirit of 1914 (German: Geist von 1914; or, more frequently, Augusterlebnis, lit. 'August Experience') was the name given to the feeling of euphoria that affected parts of the German population at the start of World War I. For many decades after the war, the enthusiasm was portrayed as nearly universal, but studies since the 1970s have shown that it was more limited. It was experienced primarily by the educated upper and middle classes in the large cities who saw it as exciting, a chance to reshape lives and to lift Germany to its proper role as a great world power. The urban working class and rural Germans, however, took little part in the jubilation. They looked at the war sceptically and as a matter of duty.

The government portrayed the war to the people as purely defensive and likely to be short, lasting perhaps only a few months. When the German military failed to achieve the quick victory everyone expected, the euphoria faded into a grim determination. The memory of the August experience was nevertheless regularly recalled after Germany's defeat, in part by the politicians of the Left who wanted to justify their support for the war.

== Background ==
The reactions of the German people to the outbreak of World War I had roots that went back at least as far as the founding of the German Empire in 1871. Because Germany's unification had taken place under Prussian leadership and Prussia was by far the most populous state in the new nation, it was in a position to be a dominant force in the Empire. Its strong military tradition, rooted in the Prussian nobility, led to Prussian virtues such as duty, obedience, loyalty and discipline playing an important role in shaping middle class society in the Empire.

Both nationalism and social Darwinism were also common among the educated classes. The belief that war was necessary for a people's survival was spread by schools, universities, youth groups, churches and patriotic societies such as the Pan-German League and the Colonial Society.

Under Emperor Wilhelm II (r. 1888–1918), Germany strove to gain the status of a great power and to have its proper "place in the sun". Wilhelm, however, was prone to diplomatic blunders such as the Kruger telegram (1896) and the Daily Telegraph Affair (1908) which seriously offended Britain. Germany's unpredictable foreign policy and its military sabre-rattling, especially the Second Morocco Crisis and the expansion of its navy to compete with Britain's, led to the 1907 Triple Entente agreement between Britain, France and Russia. Germany felt that it was encircled by enemies and began to consider a preventative war that would allow it a quick victory before its enemies became too strong for it to overcome (see the Schlieffen Plan).

War propaganda was able to reach a mass audience immediately after the outbreak of the war and to spread the belief that Germany was defending itself from attack when it declared war, a belief that the government thought was necessary to win the people's support.

== The "August experience" ==
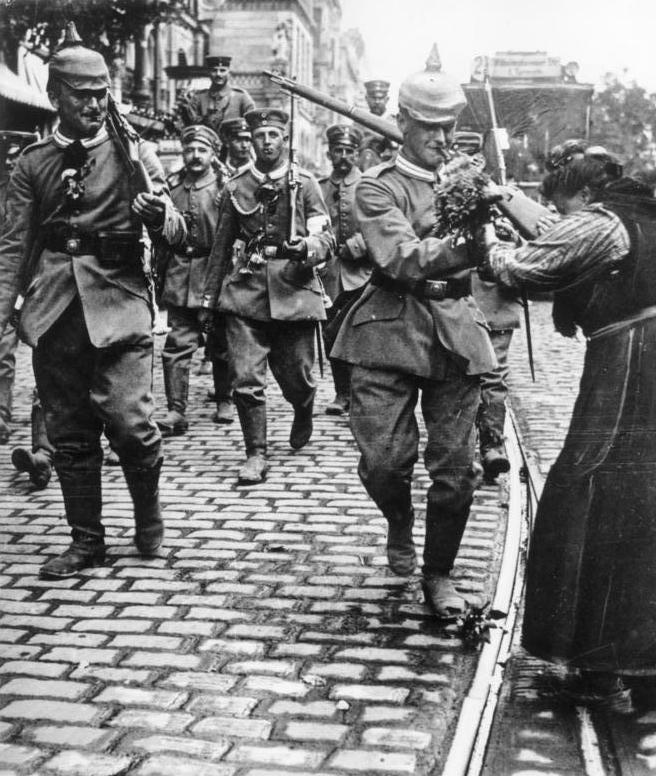
A woman gives flowers to a soldier on 1 August 1914.

Until well after the end of World War I, most historians held that the enthusiasm for the war at its outbreak had been almost universal in the major countries involved. The picture is now more nuanced. The German sense of elation in August 1914 affected primarily intellectuals, university students and the middle class in the larger cities. Among the urban worker and rural populations, the mood was more sombre and sceptical: "The soldiers did not go to war with a joy in their hearts and a song on their lips, but instead with grim determination and out of a sense of duty." The fact that it was the jubilation rather than the resignation that was widely reported can be explained by the fact that the elite, with the backing of the government, were in the position to project their perceptions onto the whole of German society.

The news of the defeat of Russian forces at the Battle of Tannenberg in East Prussia (23 to 30 August) and reports portraying a victorious march into Belgium briefly spread the war euphoria even to the working class, but when the promised quick victory failed to materialise, the feeling faded.

=== Enthusiasm ===
When Germany's ultimatum to Russia demanding that it demobilise expired on 1 August 1914, an officer announced from the Berlin Palace that Germany too was mobilising. The crowd that had gathered to await the news then sang Johann Sebastian Bach's chorale Nun danket alle Gott ("Now all give thanks to God") in a clear expression of religious emotion.

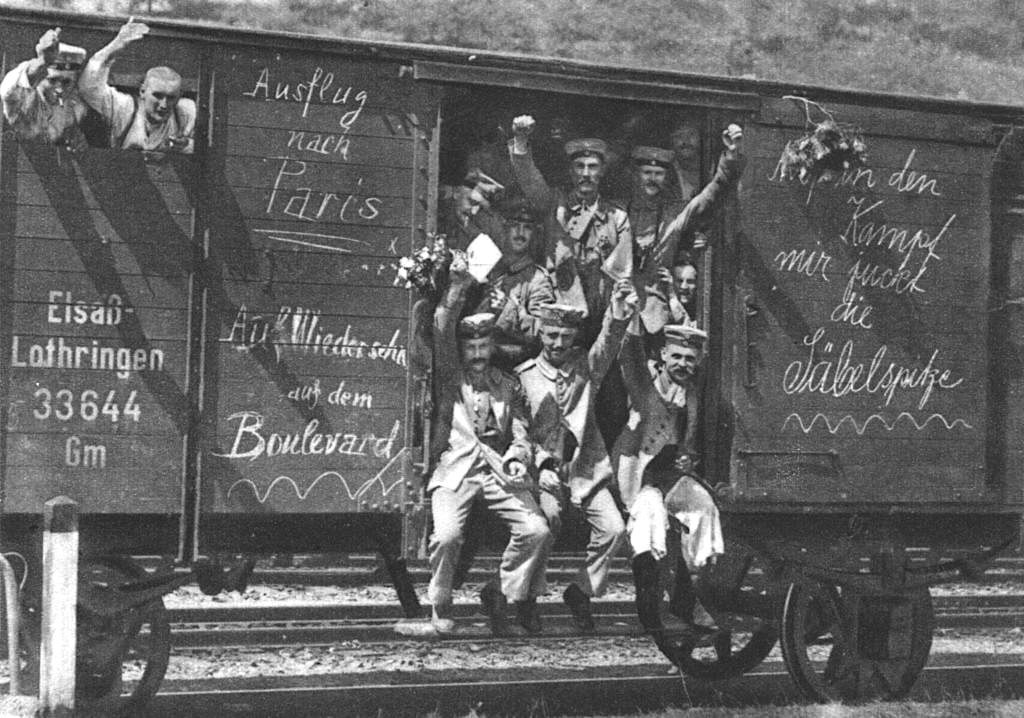
German soldiers on the way to the front in 1914. Messages on the car read: "Trip to Paris", "See you later on the Boulevard", "Off to battle" and "My sword tip is itching". It is not known whether the soldiers' enthusiasm is genuine or if the scene was staged for propaganda purposes.

In 1958 Golo Mann, one of Thomas Mann's sons, wrote that "jubilation, war fury and the joy of war" could be felt everywhere in Europe, since everyone thought they were the ones under attack, especially in Germany. For years the belief had been growing that Germany was encircled by enemies from whom it was necessary to free itself. It was the news of the Russian mobilisation in particular that triggered a wave of patriotism. The subsequent rapid succession of declarations of war against Russia and France gave the impression that the impending encirclement had been averted, with the result that confidence in victory spread.

For some Germans, the beginning of the war was perceived as a "revival experience". Many students viewed the existential experience of battle as a possible escape from an existence that was seen as boring and shallow. Nationalist-minded Germans spoke of the "cleansing steel bath of the nation". Military historian Manfried Rauchensteiner saw the enthusiasm for war as a very real factor that had an impact across all social classes and political camps. The prospect of war in the summer of 1914 became a projection screen for a wide range of political, philosophical and existential desires:

People did not take it for granted that there was such a thing as war, but it did not seem particularly frightening to them either; war was part of the human condition and was tremendously exciting. War seemed to be the ideal way to escape from everyday life. ... All sorts of contradictory things flowed into the feeling: weariness of modernity and the longing for something new, irrational expectations of redemption, the resolution of a wide variety of dilemmas, the overcoming of stagnation. ... [O]ne had the feeling that the war was seen as salvation. ... Students, professors, writers, artists, priests, atheists, anarchists, political activists, radicals: everyone wanted to be there when the Pax Europaea came to an end. ... They all saw in war not the horror, but the change.

An emergency Abitur (the qualification exam that came at the end of a secondary school education) was decreed on the day the war began. In view of the enthusiasm for the war that gripped many young men, upper primary school pupils (13th grade) who wanted to join the army voluntarily were allowed to take the Abitur early. The written but not the oral examinations were waived. In a very short time, entire sixth forms were channelled through the process and were ready for military service. One of them was the poet Carl Zuckmayer, who later described the experience:

For us, the whole thing was tremendous fun. The uniform gave even the worst pupil a touch of manly dignity against which the teacher was powerless. ... We were asked only the easiest questions, so no one could fail. The Abitur, the nightmare of many youthful years, became a family celebration.

There were those among the educated elite who hoped that the "Spirit of 1914" would help heal the social, political and cultural divisions that plagued Germany. With the nation threatened from without, a new spirit of community would reshape national life. The burdens and rewards of the war would be shared equally. But the early idealism became disillusionment in the face of the reality of the war.

=== Religious and cultural expressions ===
Some churches gave the war their religious blessing. Dietrich Vorwerk, a Protestant pastor, reworked the Lord's Prayer nationalistically: "In thy merciful patience, forgive each bullet and each blow that misses its mark. Lead us not into the temptation of letting our wrath be too gentle in carrying out Thy divine judgment. Deliver us and our pledged ally from the Evil One and his servants on earth. Thine is the kingdom, the German land. May we, through Thy mailed hand, come to power and glory."

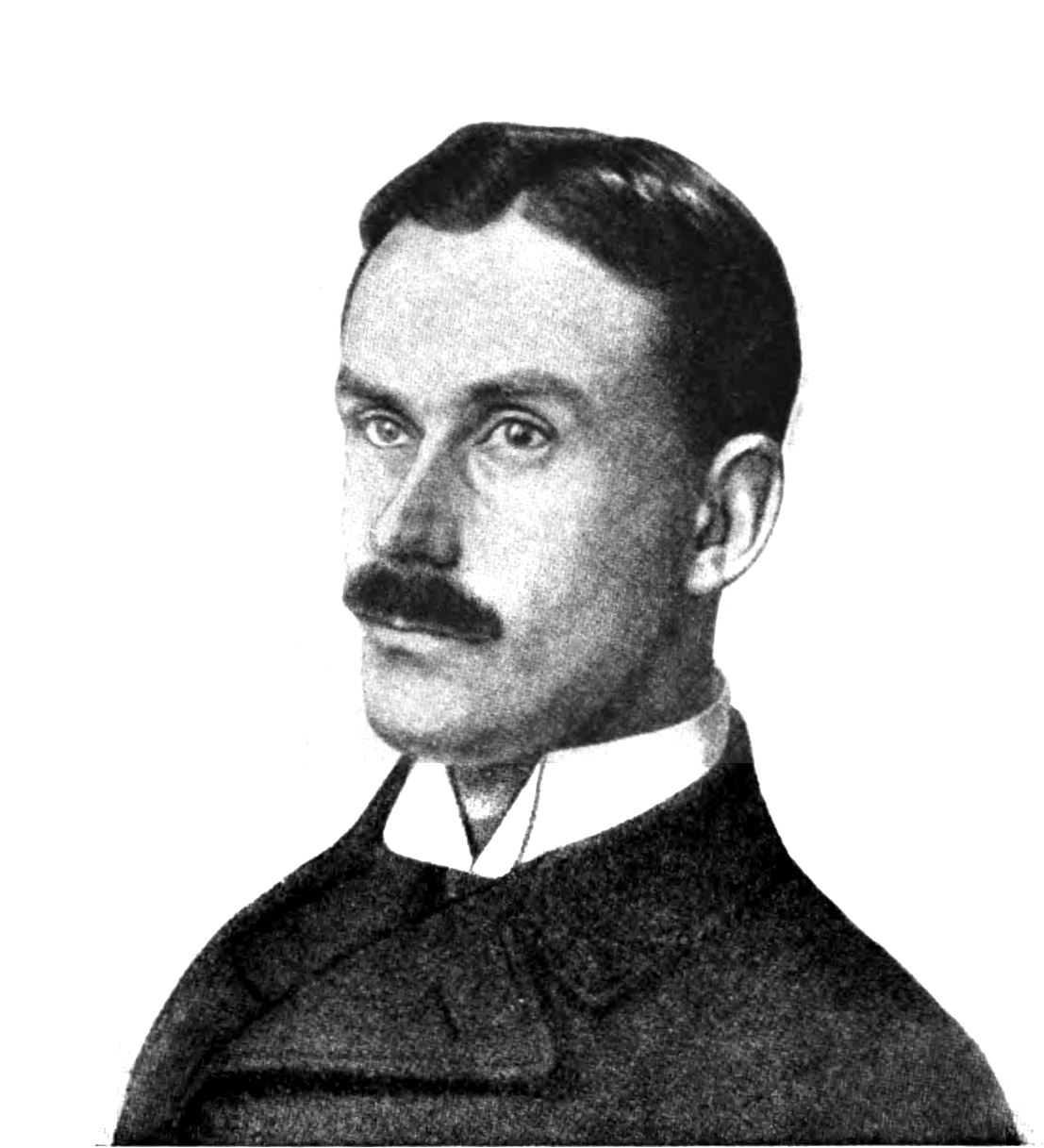
The Nobel Prize winning writer Thomas Mann in 1913. He supported the war on cultural grounds.

The war was welcomed by some writers and artists. In his "Thoughts in War" (Gedanken im Krieg), written in August and September 1914, Thomas Mann spoke of the war as "cleansing" and an exit from a peaceful world:

We knew it, this world of peace. ... Did it not swarm with the vermin of the spirit like maggots? Did it not fester and stink of the decomposing substance of civilisation? ... How could the artist, the soldier in the artist, not have praised God for the collapse of a world of peace with which he was so fed up, so utterly fed up? War! What we felt was purification, liberation and a tremendous hope.

Support for the war was reflected in the Manifesto of the Ninety-three (Manifest der 93) of October 1914, a document signed by 93 artists and intellectuals, including Mann. In defence of Germany's conduct of the war, they made reference to its culture: "You who know us, you who together with us have guarded the highest possessions of mankind – to you we also call out: Believe us! Believe that we shall fight this war to the end as a cultured people to whom the legacy of Goethe, Beethoven and Kant are as sacred as hearth and land." The same feelings were echoed in the Declaration of University Teachers of the German Reich of October 1914, which was signed by almost 90% of Germany's university teachers: "Our belief is that the salvation of the entire culture of Europe depends on the victory that German 'militarism' will win." Both declarations, it should be noted, were primarily a reaction to the worldwide outrage over the German Army's actions in Belgium during the early stages of the war.

Intellectuals who had kept their distance from the masses presented themselves as patriots. The sociologist Max Weber wrote of "this great and marvellous war" and that it was wonderful to still be able to experience it, even if very bitter not to be allowed to go to the front. Rudolf Alexander Schröder wrote in his 1915 poem "We ride hidden by forests and gorges" (Wir reiten von Wäldern und Schluchten verborgen): "For you I want to live, for you I want to die, Germany, Germany." In "Soldier's Farewell" (Soldatenabschied), Heinrich Lersch in 1914 wrote the frequently quoted refrain "Germany must live, even if we have to die!"

=== Austria-Hungary ===
The experience of the people in the Austro-Hungarian Empire at the start of World War I was in many ways similar to that in Germany. The enthusiasm was not particularly widespread. It was strongest among the middle class, in the large cities and in the German and Hungarian regions, although initially it was felt among the Poles and Czechs as well. The Habsburg monarchy portrayed its tie to the German Empire as one of Nibelungentreue ("Nibelung loyalty") and saw itself as a superior bulwark of civilization against the "barbarian East" of the Serbs and Russians.

Prior to the start of the war, Austrian social democrats supported peace initiatives and held anti-war demonstrations. After the fighting began, they hoped it would bring changes to the unjust political and social systems not just at home but across Europe. It was seen as a chance to overcome the decadent pessimism of the aristocracy's Fin de siècle culture. Once the initial mood of enthusiasm wore down, however, the Dual Monarchy fell into a period of political passivity. Resistance to its war policy came only later.

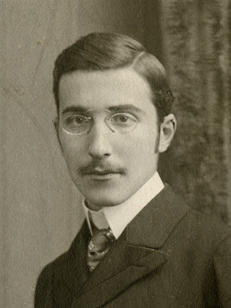
The Austrian writer Stefan Zweig in 1900. He opposed the war but was swept up by the enthusiasm of the moment.

The Austrian author Stefan Zweig described the seductive solidarity brought by the outbreak of the war:

To do honour to the truth, I must confess that there was something magnificent, captivating and even seductive in this first awakening of the masses, and that it was difficult to resist. In spite of all my hatred and disgust towards the war, I would not want to have foregone the memory left behind by those first days. As never before, thousands and hundreds of thousands felt what they should have felt in peace: that they belonged together. A city of two million, a country of almost fifty million, felt in that hour that they were witnessing world history, that they were experiencing a moment that would never return, and that all were called upon to hurl their own tiny 'I's into the glowing mass in order to purify themselves of selfishness. All differences of class, language and religion were for that one moment submerged in the surging feeling of brotherhood.

== The other side of the experience ==
=== Bank runs and mass hysteria ===
In spite of the strong emotional support for the war among certain groups, throughout July many people withdrew their money from savings accounts and attempted to exchange paper money for gold or silver coins. Church attendance was reported to be at unusually high levels. Immediately following the declaration of war, there was panicked buying of food and other basic supplies. The lists of fallen soldiers that were posted publicly during the war's first weeks were prohibited in the autumn as they grew ever longer.

Incidents of mass hysteria also broke out in the weeks leading up to the start of the war. A number of people were beaten by crowds for not responding with sufficient enthusiasm when, for example, the Emperor's Hymn was played in a café. Spies were imagined everywhere. The philosopher Theodor Lessing was arrested in Hanover because of his "Russian-looking" beard. When a rumour spread in early August that French gold was being smuggled to Russia, a total of 28 people were shot dead at impromptu roadblocks. A police president compared the situation to a madhouse: "Everyone sees a Russian or French spy in the person next to him and believes he has a duty to beat him and anyone protecting him to a bloody pulp. Clouds are mistaken for aeroplanes, stars for airships, bicycle handlebars for bombs, and spies are shot under martial law."

=== Anti-war sentiment ===
Opponents of the war were active until 29 July when the Russian Empire announced its partial mobilisation. Up to that point, a total of 288 anti-war meetings and marches had taken place in 160 cities. On 28 July 1914, for example, anti-war demonstrations were held in Hamburg and in Berlin's Lustgarten, where there were more than 100,000 participants – as compared to the 30,000 war supporters who had been in the streets five days before. The leadership of the Social Democratic Party (SPD) was nevertheless reluctant to use mass protests as a means of exerting political pressure and taking the offensive against the "Hurrah Patriots". Their anti-war efforts were mostly confined to meetings in closed rooms as authorised by the police, leaving the streets to the pro-war sections of the middle class. When the war broke out, the radical turnaround to support for it by the SPD leadership and most SPD party newspapers angered large sections of the working class, who tended to show resignation and little enthusiasm for the war even after 1 August.

=== Workers and peasants ===
According to police reports on the mood of the population, the war was met with scepticism and anxiety in the working-class districts of the large industrial cities. In a pub in Hamburg, the police heard workingmen ask what the heir to Austria's throne had to do with them and why they should give their lives for him. An SPD official in Bremen said that the mood among the workers there on the first of August was grim: "Mothers, wives and brides bring the young men to the train station and cry. Everyone has the feeling that they are going straight to the slaughterhouse."

Historian Sven Oliver Müller noted that in the countryside, the beginning of the war caused "an almost general feeling of deep depression". The Munich newspaper Münchner Neueste Nachrichten wrote: "Many of our peasant families are in deep mourning because the fathers of often very large families have to leave; the sons, horses and wagons have been requisitioned by the military authorities and the harvest is waiting."

== Political reactions ==
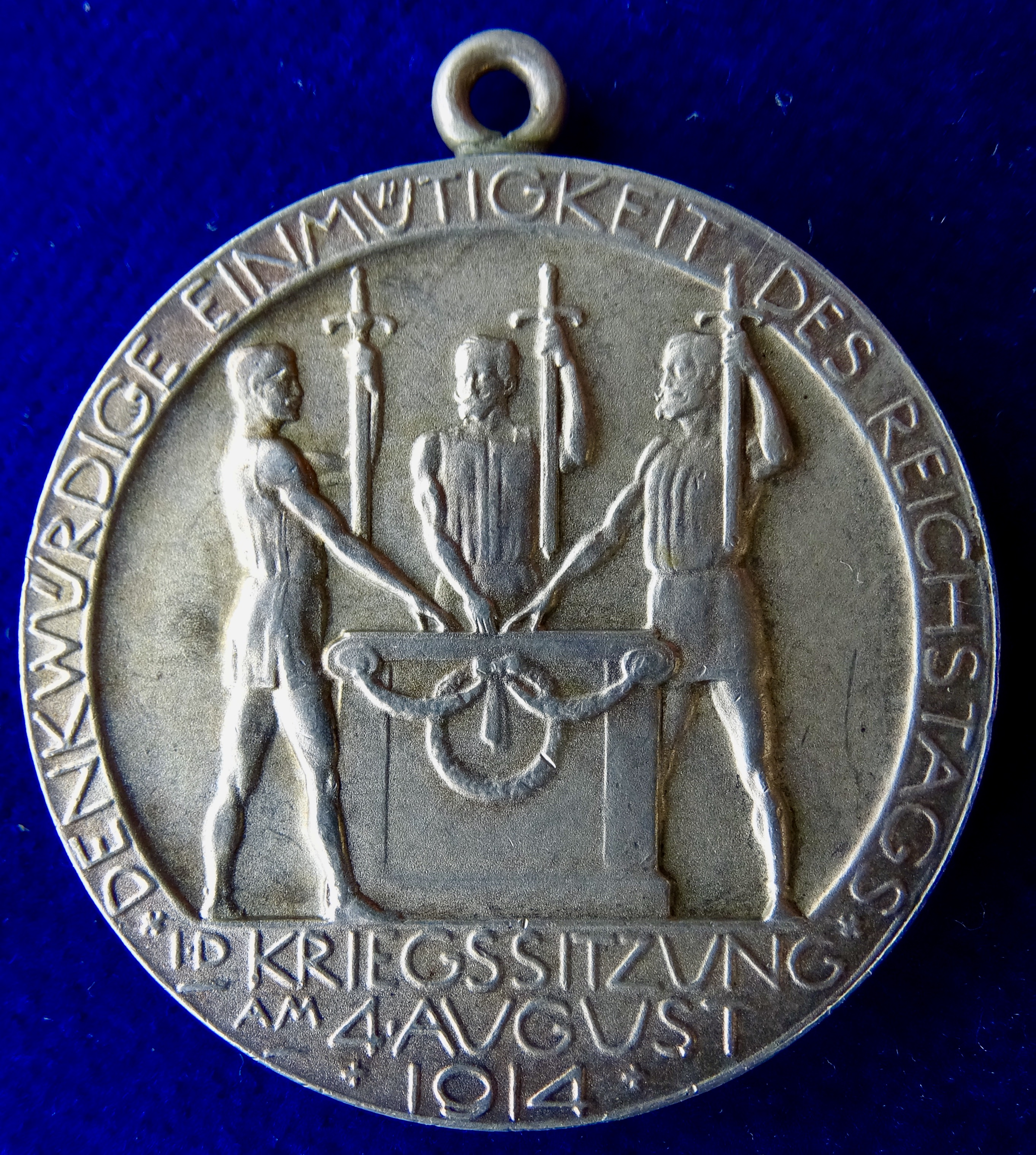
Silver medal commemorating the Reichstag's vote to support the war. The inscription reads: "Memorable unanimity of the German Reichstag. War session 4 August 1914".

The SPD was the largest party in the Reichstag when the war broke out and the only one whose support for war credits was initially in doubt. In spite of its earlier anti-war stand, the SPD voted unanimously for the loans and became part of the Burgfrieden, the political truce between the political parties that was intended to hold for the length of the war. Hugo Haase, chairman of the Reichstag parliamentary group said in defence of the SPD's actions: "We will not abandon our own country in its hour of danger. We feel that we are consistent with the International, which has always recognised the right of every nation to independence and self-defence, just as in agreement with it we condemn any war of conquest." Supporters of the SPD identified in particular with the fight against the anti-progressive Russian Empire. Its most important spokesman on the subject was Reichstag deputy Ludwig Frank, who died as a war volunteer on 3 September 1914. Within the SPD, the previously anti-war members of the Lensch-Cunow-Haenisch group attempted to support German imperialism using Marxist arguments.

In almost all of the countries involved in the war, the socialist parties initially joined the ranks of the "defenders of the fatherland" and as in Germany voted for war loans in their parliaments. The Second International collapsed under the strain in the summer of 1914. The national truces began to crumble in 1916–17, when the absence of military success despite high casualty rates and the deteriorating food situation, especially in the states of the Central Powers that were under the Allied blockade, shattered the illusion of a community that transcended class. The middle class was also affected by the war and suffered from the transition to a war economy. Among it, too, the initial jubilation gave way to a patriotism of endurance.

== Research trends ==
The facts that photographs were most often taken in the cities and that journalists and writers tended to report from the capitals played a key role in the dominant image of a rejoicing population. "The widespread jubilation over the impending war, at least among parts of the population in the major European capitals, cannot be denied", wrote Ian Kershaw. Nowhere in Europe, however, was the enthusiasm for the war universal.

Hardly any role is now played by the line of research that argues that the spirit of 1914 did not occur at all. There is some interest, however, in the extent to which the emotional awakening was a cultural staging that shaped the discourse on the events of July and August 1914 until the 1970s. According to this view, the image of general enthusiasm for the war was favoured not least by the Social Democrats to justify the decision of their Reichstag party contingent to vote for war credits and join the Burgfrieden. Many theses about the events of August 1914 were based on post-1918 statements by SPD politicians who were under great pressure to justify themselves, or on sources from the middle class, the majority of whom had indeed been filled with enthusiasm for the war. In his 1974 book Wir Untertanen. Ein Deutsches Anti-Geschichtsbuch ("We Subjects. A German Anti-History Book"), Bernt Engelmann acknowledged the mass rallies and meetings against the war which brought Social Democrats to the streets just days before the start of the war, but then admitted: "The whole nation, not excluding most Social Democrats, was already gripped by an unparalleled war hysteria. Everyone acted as if the German Reich had been treacherously invaded by vicious enemies, out of the blue and without the slightest fault of its own."

Steffen Bruendel also disagreed with the notion of war enthusiasm as a constructed legend. He argued that such a construction would not have been possible without the real emotional atmosphere. Herbert Rosinski stressed that no eyewitness would ever forget the outbreak of war in August 1914: "It was not a work of propaganda." The crisis had developed far too quickly to allow time for psychological preparation." Peter Hoeres argued against an "over-correction of the August experience". A "whole spectrum of behaviour between the poles of fear and enthusiasm" could be observed.

== See also ==
- Sacred Union (France)
- Spirit of 1917 (United States)
