= The Trollopes: The Chronicle of a Writing Family =

1945 book by Lucy and Richard Poate Stebbins

- Author: Lucy Poate Stebbins and Richard Poate Stebbins
- Language: English
- Subject: Frances Milton Trollope; Anthony Trollope; Thomas Adolphus Trollope
- Published: 1945
- Publisher: Columbia University Press
- Pages: 394
- ISBN: 0231942869
- OCLC: 1104879525

The Trollopes: The Chronicle of a Writing Family is a 1945 book by Lucy Poate Stebbins and her son Richard Poate Stebbins. Released by Columbia University Press, it centers on Frances Milton Trollope and her sons Anthony Trollope and Thomas Adolphus Trollope, all three of them writers. The book received positive reception for its coverage and accessibility, but divisive opinions on the handling of the subjects, particularly Anthony.

== Contents and themes ==
The Trollopes is centered on Frances Milton Trollope, her sons Anthony and Thomas Adolphus Trollope; all three of them were novelists. The book starts with the Trollope matriarch, depicting her marriage and her struggle against poverty and illness, before centering around Anthony's life. Other people featured include husband Thomas Anthony, grandson Henry, and several in-law relatives, as well as contemporaries such as Robert Browning and William Makepeace Thackeray. The final part of the book includes a family tree of the Trollope family.

Topics discussed throughout the work include relationships, tragedies, political connections, and other internal family issues. According to John Gould Fletcher, the book argues that Anthony Trollope was "was extremely hard-working, but at bottom a crusty, disappointed, self-thwarted man and largely a self-deceiving one to boot; but a few flashes of genius at his disposal".

== Background and release ==
The Trollopes was co-authored by novelist Lucy Poate Stebbins and her son, federal government official and future Council on Foreign Relations editor Richard Poate Stebbins. Prior to the book's release, the mother-son duo had released two books about German classical musicians - Enchanted Wanderer (1940) and Frank Damrosch: Let the People Sing (1945) - and the younger Stebbins had written a New York Times review of The Tireless Traveler: A Lifetime of Exploration, an edited volume of travel letters Anthony Trollope had written to the Liverpool Mercury, in 1942. Bradford A. Booth called it "a novelty in biography: one writing family comments on another", and Kirkus Reviews pointed out that this was "written by a mother and son -- this story of a mother and her sons."

The Trollopes was released by Columbia University Press on October 30, 1945. It has 394 pages and, around the time of release, sold for $4.00.

== Reception ==
A. F. of the Irish Independent and W. G. Rogers applauded the extent of the coverage, and Fletcher commended the writers' extensive efforts on the research. Several reviewers praised the accessibility of the book, though Rogers was concerned that "it does not cater to the man in the street". Grennan praised the neutral approach towards the subjects, remarking that the book "will send many readers back to Barsetshire",; further, both Booth and The Kenyon Review characterized the portrayal of several subjects as sympathetic and psychoanalytic (respectively).

Fletcher called it more interesting than Lord David Cecil's Hardy; Kirkus Reviews discovered in the book "a sense of freshness since the half-forgotten Sadleir and Walpole books;" and J. C. Squire boasted that the scope of the book surpassed other works about Anthony Trollope, including those written by Michael Sadleir. Harry Levin also drew comparisons with other novelist biographies released the same year, (Note: Namely Laura L. Hinkley's Charlotte and Emily: The Brontës, Frederick J. Hoffman's Freudianism and the Literary Mind, and Frances Winwar's The Life of the Heart: George Sand and her Times, as well as the F. Scott Fitzgerald edited volume The Crack-Up, Gordon Norton Ray's edited volume The Letters and Private Papers of William Makepeace Thackeray (1945) and Nicholas Wreden's translation of Tikhon Polner's Tolstoy and his Wife.) noting that the "well-rounded family chronicle" could complement Trollope's existing An Autobiography. Mrs. J. W. Bonner of the Tampa Bay Times vowed that the book "will delight Trollope enthusiasts and will interest anyone with literary tastes".

Several critics derided the authors' negative portrayal of Anthony, with The Kenyon Review characterizing it as anti-Victorian and Fletcher feeling that it did not adequately address the discrepancy between his posthumous popularity and that of his brother Thomas. Conversely, Orville Prescott of The New York Times called it an example of Anthony's then-growing critical applause.
