= Edith Dunham Foster =

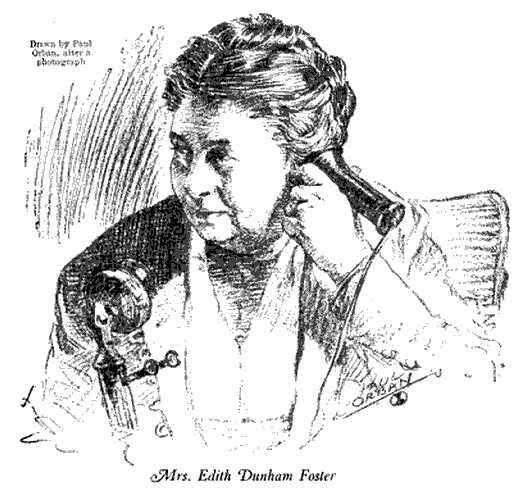
- Born: Edith Dunham; March 21, 1864; Geneseo, Illinois, US
- Died: May 8, 1950; Hackensack, New Jersey, US
- Occupation: educational filmmaker

Edith Dunham Foster (March 21, 1864 – May 8, 1950) was an American educational filmmaker who served as the editor of the Motion Picture Community Bureau, which furnished nearly all of the films seen by American armed forces during World War I.

== Biography ==
Edith Dunham was born on March 21, 1864, in Geneseo, Illinois. She married William Horton Foster on May 20, 1885, in Geneseo.

Foster, who became interested in cinema through her involvement with the General Federation of Women's Clubs, worked as an editor and programmer for the Motion Picture Community Bureau. Her son Warren Dunham Foster was the Bureau's president. During World War I, the Bureau supplied the YMCA War Work Council and the Committee on Training Camp Activities with nine million feet of film a week used in the United States and two million feet of film a week used abroad. The films were watched by soldiers from the United States and its allies worldwide. Foster oversaw the development of a projecting machine that put pictures on the ceiling so that injured soldiers could watch films from their hospital cots. After the war Foster continued working with her son, a patent attorney and an inventor, on the production of educational films and the invention of motion picture apparatus.

Foster co-created the Educational Film Catalog with Ruth Ellen Gould Dolese.

Foster died on May 8, 1950, in Hackensack, New Jersey.
