= South Dakota Legislative Research Council =

Governmental agency

Type
- Type: Non-partisan

Meeting place
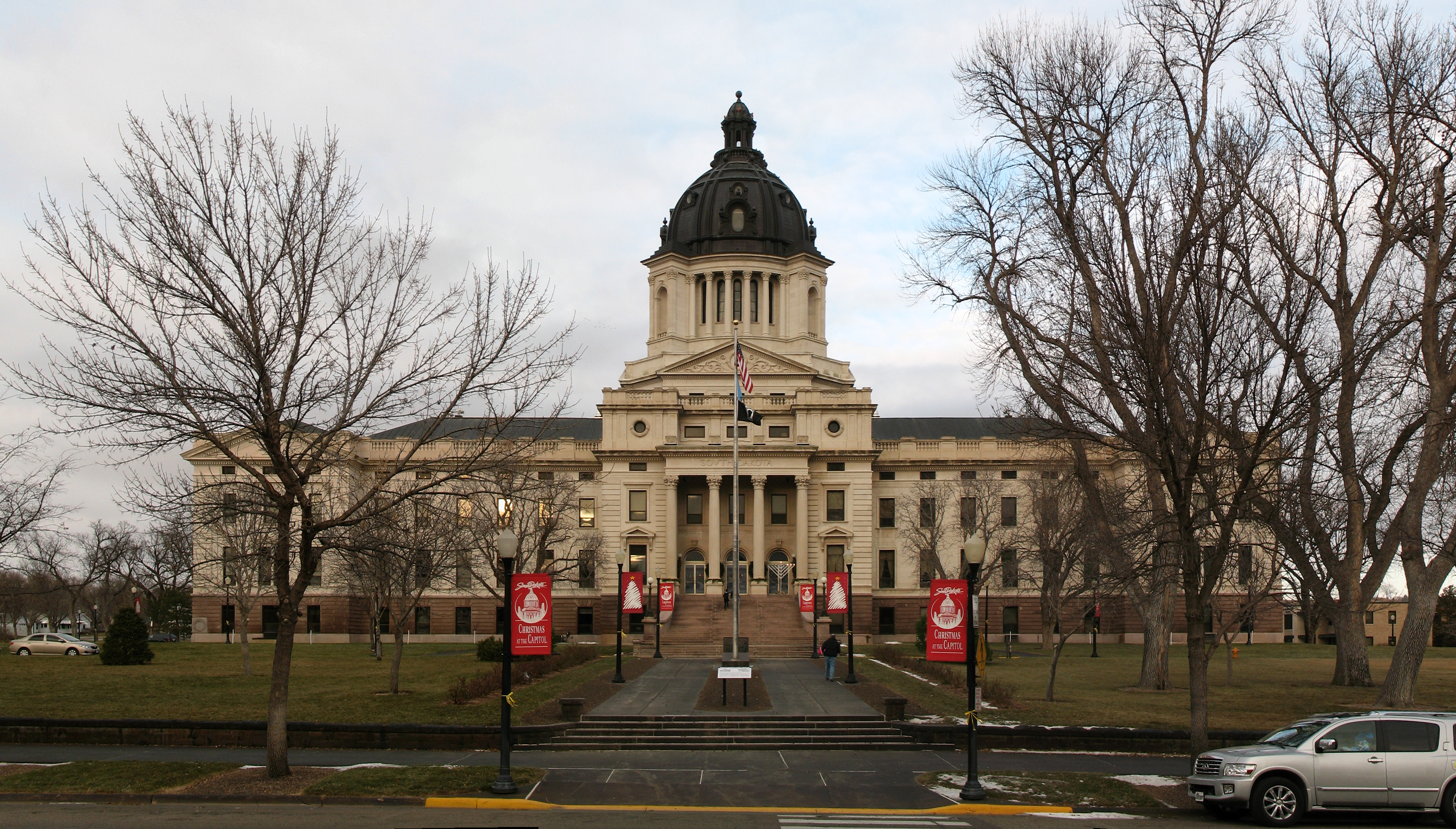
- South Dakota State Capitol, Pierre

Website
- sdlegislature.gov

The South Dakota Legislative Research Council (colloquially known as the LRC) is the governmental agency under the legislative branch of the government of South Dakota.

== South Dakota State Legislature ==
The Legislative Research Council operates in the South Dakota State Capitol in Pierre. It performs legislative duties year-round, but its bill drafting responsibilities culminate in the start of the legislative session, beginning the second Tuesday of January each year. The legislative session lasts 40 working days in odd-numbered years, and 35 days working days in even numbered years. Generally, the Legislative Research Council will work through every business day until the session ends, excepting the last day, which follows a two-week recess to allow for consideration of gubernatorial vetoes. The LRC was founded by political science professor William O. Farber.
