= William O. Farber =

American political scientist

William O. 'Doc' Farber
- Born: July 4, 1910; Geneseo, Illinois
- Died: March 24, 2007 (aged 96); Vermillion, South Dakota
- Education: Northwestern University (M.A.); University of Wisconsin-Madison (Ph.D.)
- Parent(s): Charles W. and Hulda Ogden Farber
- Scientific career
- Fields: Political Philosophy; Comparative Government

William Ogden "Doc" Farber (July 4, 1910 – March 24, 2007) was an American political scientist, professor emeritus at the University of South Dakota, and founder of the South Dakota Legislative Research Council. Notable protégés that credit his teachings as influences include Tom Brokaw, Al Neuharth, Dennis Daugaard, Dusty Johnson, and Pat O'Brien.

== Early life ==
Farber was born on July 4, 1910, in Geneseo, Illinois, the oldest of four sons of Charles W. and Hulda Ogden Farber.

Farber graduated from Geneseo Public High School in 1928 as valedictorian. In 1932, he received a B.A. cum laude and Phi Beta Kappa from Northwestern University, in Chicago, Illinois. He continued on at Northwestern for another year while he earned his M.A. and distinguished himself as a Harris Scholar. In 1935, Farber completed his formal education when he received a Ph.D. from the University of Wisconsin, Madison.

== Academic career ==
Farber began his career as a professor of political science at The University of South Dakota in 1935. He accepted a chairmanship at North Dakota State University in 1936, but returned to the University the next year, where he served as chair of the Department of Government (now the Department of Political Science) until 1976.

During his tenure at The University of South Dakota, he founded several organizations dedicated to advancing research in government. Farber created the University's Government Research Bureau and founded the South Dakota Legislative Research Council, serving as its first director. In addition, Farber served as chair of the Vermillion City Planning Commission and was a leading member of South Dakota's Constitutional Revision and Local Government Study Commissions.

In addition, to these, he served many roles outside of the university setting including:

- in the Office of Price Administration;
- as a warrant officer with the U.S. Army Air Force serving in the Pacific theater during World War II;
- on the Regional Loyalty Board,
- on the U.S. Civil Services Commission;
- as a minority counsel for the United States Senate Subcommittee on National Security and International Operations (chaired by Sen. Henry M. Jackson)
- as secretary of the North Atlantic Assembly's Committee on Education and Cultural Affairs

Farber was the author of a number of articles and books.

== Retirement ==
Farber retired from teaching in 1976, but came out of retirement in 1985 to teach the Honors section of American Government for incoming freshman, including that fall's entering class of Presidential-Alumni Scholars.

== Legacy ==
In 1997, members of the USD community and the South Dakota Board of Regents established the W.O. Farber Center for Civic Leadership in his honor. The center's program focuses developing leadership skills.

In 2002, Gov. Bill Janklow, one of Doc's former students, dedicated a life-sized bronze statue in front of USD's East Hall in recognition of Farber's lifelong leadership and accomplishments. Sen. Larry Pressler, a former student and one of six Rhodes Scholars who studied under Doc, provided key support to the Farber Intern and Travel Fund activities in Washington, D.C.

After the renovation of "Old Main", the lecture hall was also re-dedicated as Farber Hall. On October 20, 2004, Farber was made an honorary member of the International City/County Management association at its annual meeting in San Diego.

South Dakota House of Representatives Resolution 1001 passed unanimously on March 26, 2007 “Honoring the life, achievements, and indomitable spirit of Doctor William O. Farber, Professor Emeritus of Political Science at the University of South Dakota”.

Farber was instrumental in creating the Government Research Bureau at USD, and the South Dakota Legislative Research Council.

To help students travel abroad and participate in internships, the Farber Internship & Travel Fund was established.

His closest students are known affectionately as "Farber Boys". Famous "Farber Boys" include Tom Brokaw and Al Neuharth. Farber also tutored Dusty Johnson, who now sits on the board of directors for the W.O. Farber Fund.

== Death ==
Farber died on March 24, 2007, at Sanford Health Respite Care Center, in Vermillion, South Dakota at age 96. He was buried on April 2, 2007, at the Oakwood Cemetery in Geneseo.

== Writings ==
- Farber, William O. (1942). 'I am an American Day' in South Dakota. Vermillion, SD: University of South Dakota. pp. 33. LCCN 83-224435
- Footprints on the Prairie: The Life and Times of W. O. Farber. Rapid City, SD: Chiesman Foundation for Democracy, 2005.
- Government of South Dakota (with Thomas Carlton Geary and Loren M Carlson). Vermillion, S.D.: Dakota Press, 1979.

== See also ==
- South Dakota Legislative Research Council
