= Spirit of 1917 =

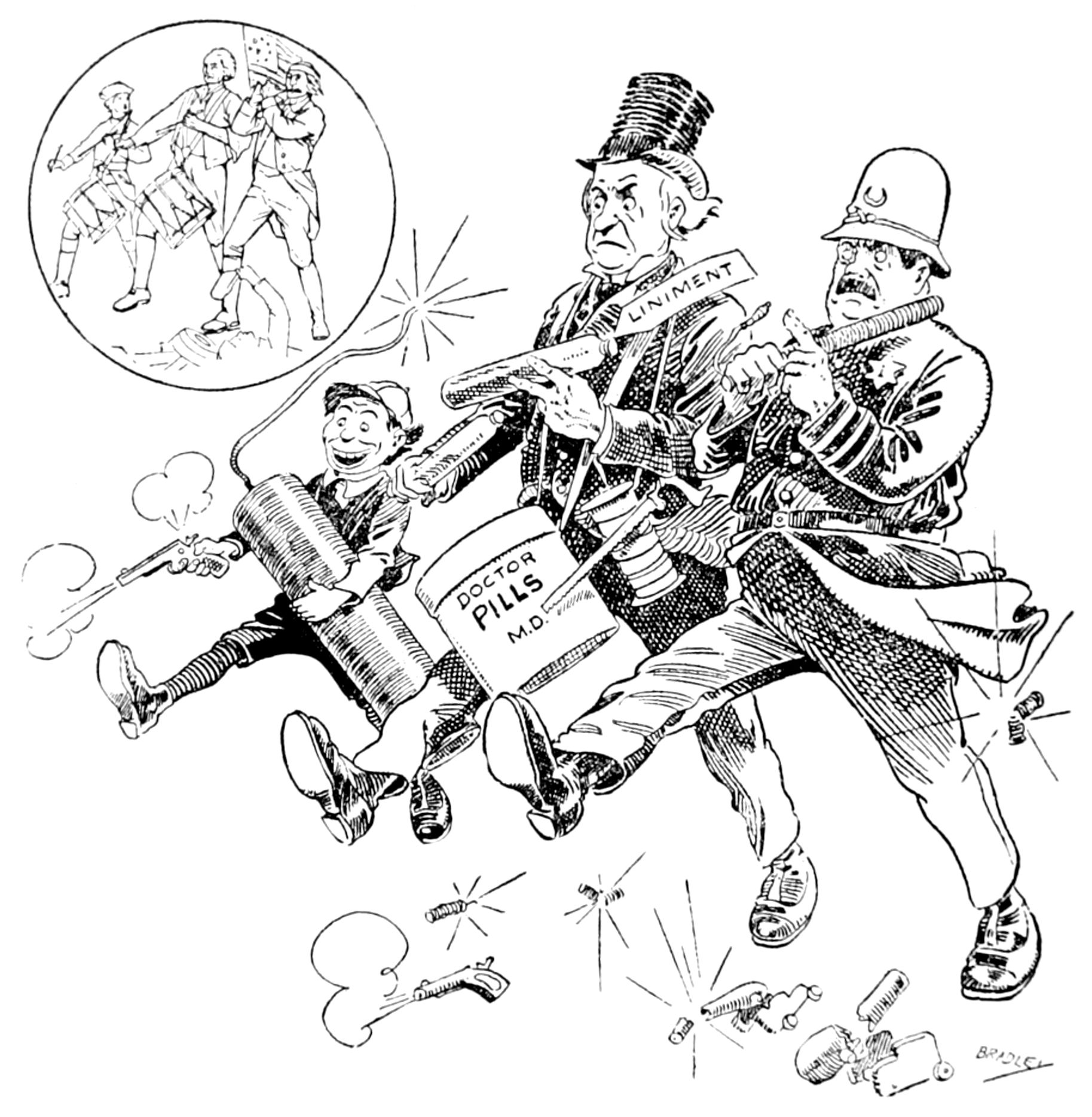
Anti-war cartoon by Luther Daniels Bradley

The Spirit of 1917 was the alleged jubilation in the United States after entering World War I. It involved nostalgia for the feelings of the Spirit of '76.

Monsignor Joseph Tonello, an Italian Roman Catholic priest and musician who had settled in the US in the 19th century, published the musical composition Spirit of 1917 that year. In its introduction, he explained that the piece was inspired by the "terrible condition of humanity in Europe" and the "resolution of the American people to stop misery and carnage and bring honorable peace and prosperity to the world."

The Spirit of 1917 was also evoked by Caliban News, a publication circulated on 9 July 1917 to promote the Boston production of Caliban by the Yellow Sands, a patriotic "community masque" by Percy MacKaye. The Spirit of 1917 was said to be that of the "Caliban Community," the term used by the promoters to describe the participants in the masque.

== Images ==
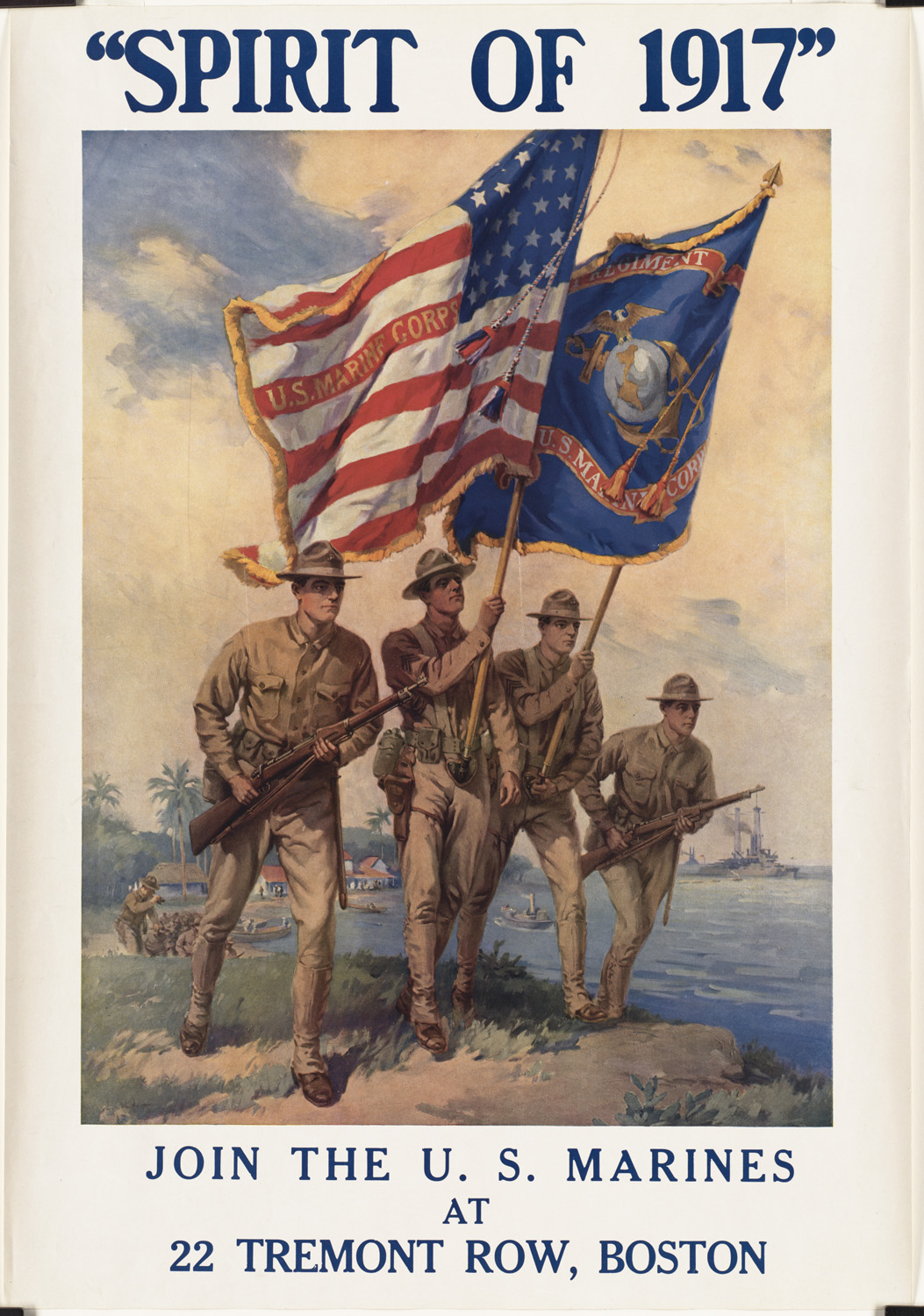
Spirit of 1917 U. S. Marine recruitment poster from a painting by Leon Alaric Shafer

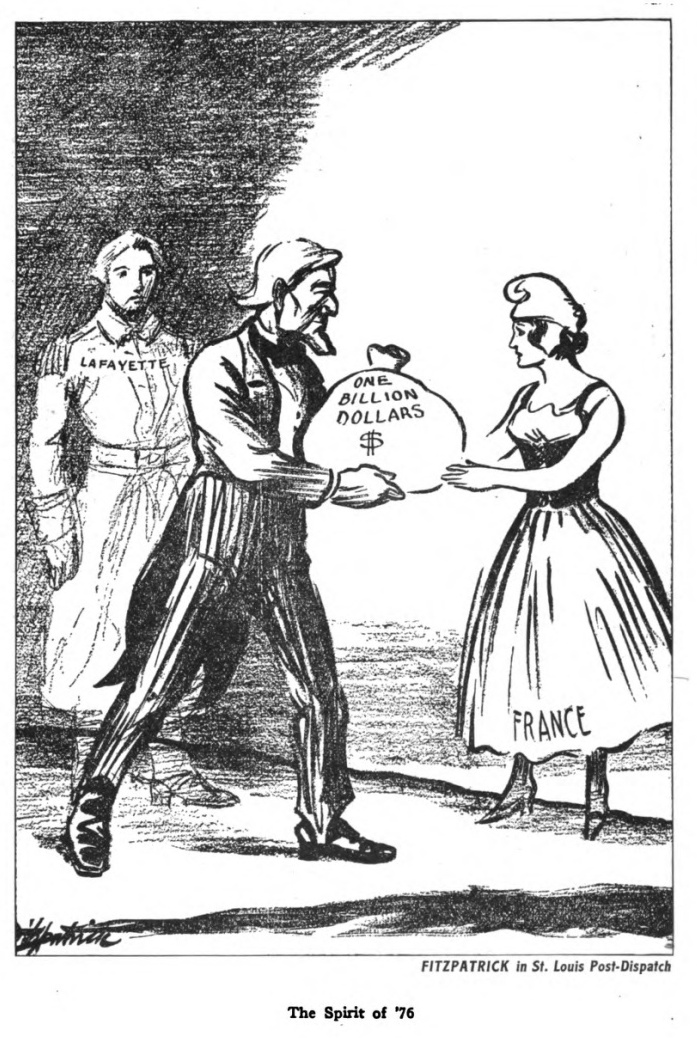
Cartoon by Daniel R. Fitzpatrick

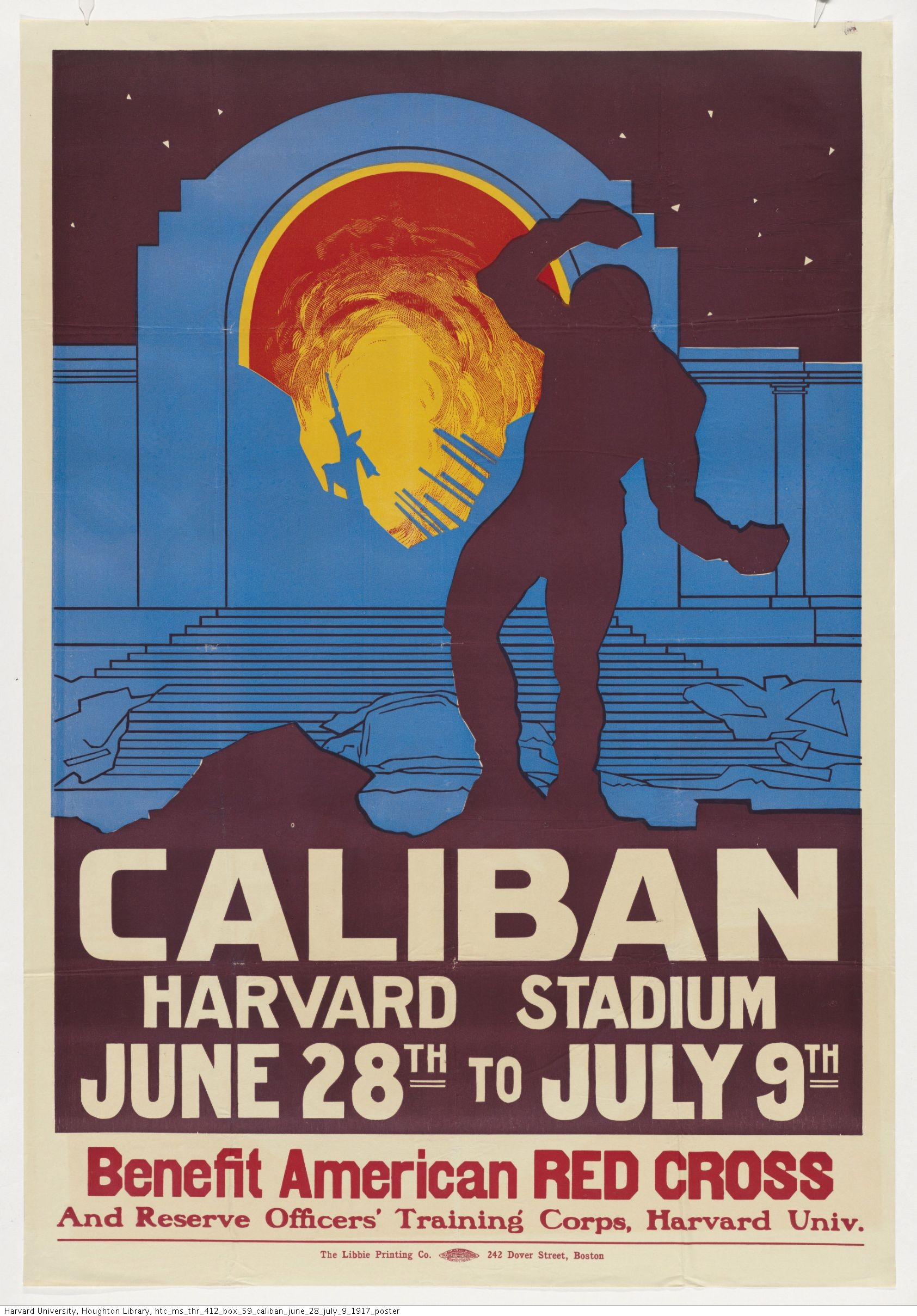
Poster for Caliban by the Yellow Sands

== See also ==
- American entry into World War I
- Rally 'round the flag effect
- Spirit of 1914
