= Lucy Poate Stebbins =

American writer (1886–1958)

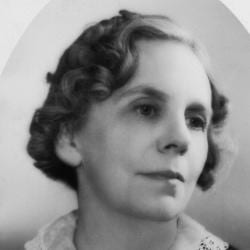
- Stebbins c. 1945
- Born: Lucy Marsh Poate; March 11, 1886; Portsmouth, England
- Died: January 30, 1958 (aged 71); Boston, Massachusetts, U.S.
- Education: Fredonia Normal School
- Occupation: Writer
- Spouse: Howard L. Stebbins (m. 1910)
- Children: 3, including Richard
- Awards: Guggenheim Fellowship (1944)

Lucy Poate Stebbins (born Lucy Marsh Poate; March 11, 1886 – January 30, 1958) was an English-born American writer. Originally an English teacher and literary advisor, she later became a published novelist and wrote several non-fiction books in the fields of biography and literary criticism. She wrote several books with her son Richard Poate Stebbins, including The Trollopes: The Chronicle of a Writing Family (1945).

== Biography ==
=== Early life and career ===
Stebbins was born Lucy Marsh Poate on March 11, 1886, in Portsmouth, England, where her parents were furloughed at the time. Her parents Belle Marsh (a Canadian from Truro, Nova Scotia) and Thomas Pratt Poate (a native of England) were Baptist missionaries based in Japan. The family latter settled in Western New York during her childhood, and she graduated from Fredonia Normal School in 1904. From 1905 to 1910, she taught English at public schools in Sherman and Mount Vernon.

Following her 1910 marriage, Stebbins left her teaching job and, after her husband became librarian of the Social Law Library in 1919, moved to Newton, Massachusetts. Originally a housewife, she worked at the H.R. Huntting Company as a literary advisor before publishing her first work. In 1928, she published her first novel, Old Adam's Likeness; she later went on to publish seven more.

=== Later career ===
In 1938, Stebbins and her son went to Europe as Oberlaender fellows to work on their Carl Maria von Weber book Enchanted Wanderer, which was released in 1940. In 1944, she was awarded a Guggenheim Fellowship to work on a book about 19th-century English women novelists. She then wrote non-fiction books in the fields of biography and literary criticism, such as Frank Damrosch: Let the People Sing, The Trollopes: The Chronicle of a Writing Family (both 1945), A Victorian Album: Some Lady Novelists of the Period (1946), and London Ladies: True Tales of the Eighteenth Century (1952). Many of her works were co-authored with her son, including The Trollopes.

She also served on The Trollopian's advisory board from 1945 to 1949. She reportedly continued writing despite health issues, and once finished a biography of novelist William Dean Howells shortly before her death.

=== Personal life and death ===
She remained married to Howard L. Stebbins until her death. Their son, Richard Poate Stebbins, was a political analyst, historian, and editor. The couple also had two daughters.

Stebbins died on January 30, 1958, in the New England Deaconess Hospital in Boston, aged 71. At the time of her death, she lived in Cambridge, where the family moved in 1943. Her son later wrote a biography about her, So Hard the Stones: Lucy Poate Stebbins and Her Life in Literature, published in 1993. Her papers are in the Schlesinger Library at the Harvard Radcliffe Institute.

== Works ==
=== Fiction ===
- Old Adam's Likeness (1928)
- Singing to Sylvia (1934)
- Gorgeous Towers (1934)
- Exit the Prince (1935)
- Morning Glory (1936) (Note: Reviews of this book:)
- The Golden Carlotta (1937)
- Summer Hostess (1938)
- Peacock Place (1939)

=== Non-fiction ===
- (with Richard Poate Stebbins) Enchanted Wanderer (1940) (Note: Reviews of this book:)
- (with Richard Poate Stebbins) Frank Damrosch: Let the People Sing (1945) (Note: Reviews of this book:)
- (with Richard Poate Stebbins) The Trollopes: The Chronicle of a Writing Family (1945)
- A Victorian Album: Some Lady Novelists of the Period (1946) (Note: Reviews of this book:)
- London Ladies: True Tales of the Eighteenth Century (1952) (Note: Reviews of this book:)
