= South Side School (Geneseo, Illinois) =

- U.S. National Register of Historic Places
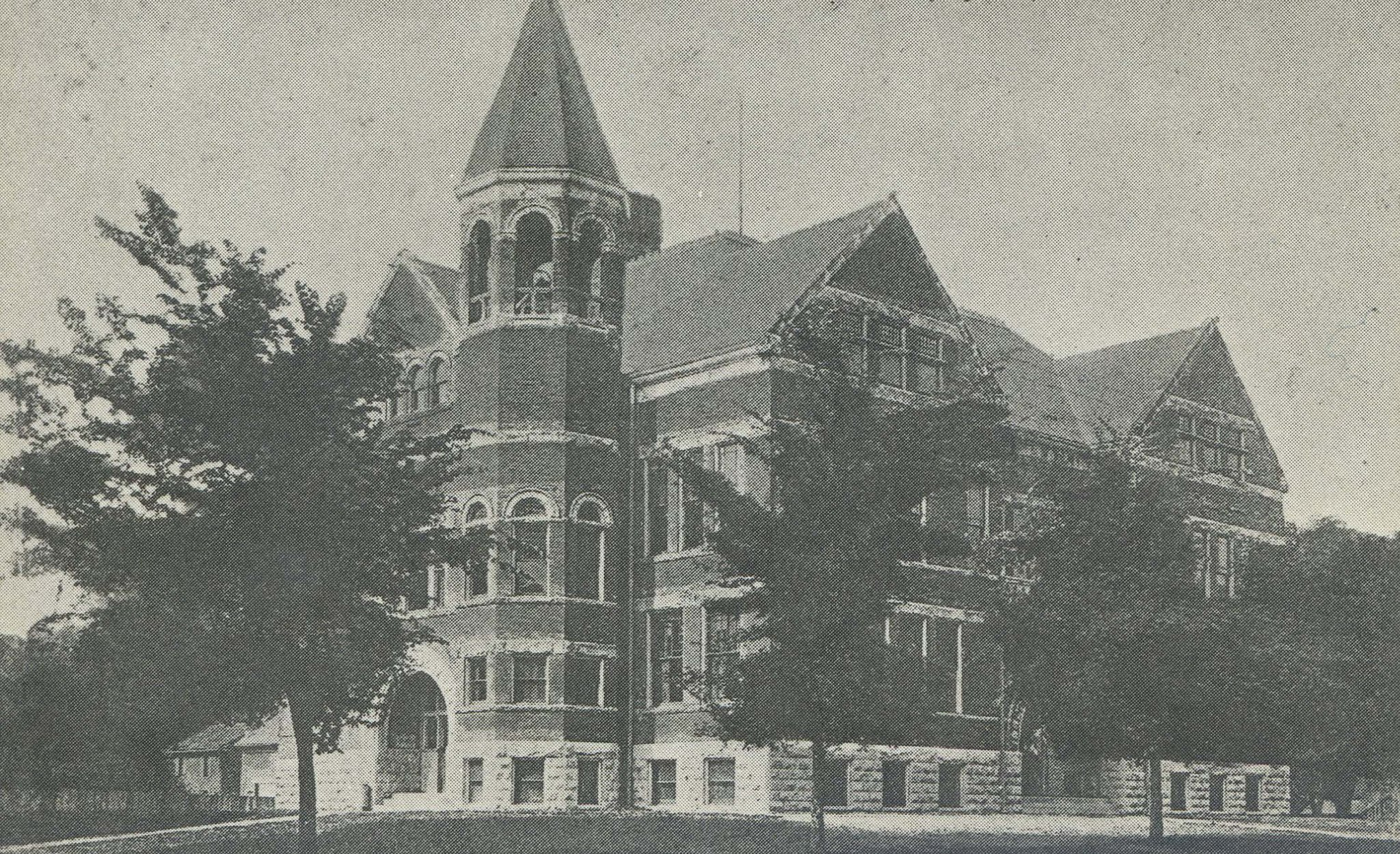

- Location within Illinois Location within the United States
- Location: 209 S. College Ave. Geneseo, Illinois
- Coordinates: 41°27′4″N 90°9′33″W
- Area: 2 acres (0.81 ha)
- Built: 1889
- Architect: Ross, J.W.; Volk Construction Co.
- Architectural style: Romanesque
- NRHP reference No.: 75002142
- Added to NRHP: May 6, 1975

The South Side School in Geneseo, Illinois was built in 1889. It was listed on the National Register of Historic Places in 1975.

It replaced "The American House" that served as a boarding house for out-of-town visitors from 1854. The South Side School was designed by architect John W. Ross and was built by Volk Construction Co. It was demolished, controversially, in 1979.
