= Geneseo, Illinois =

Geneseo
- City
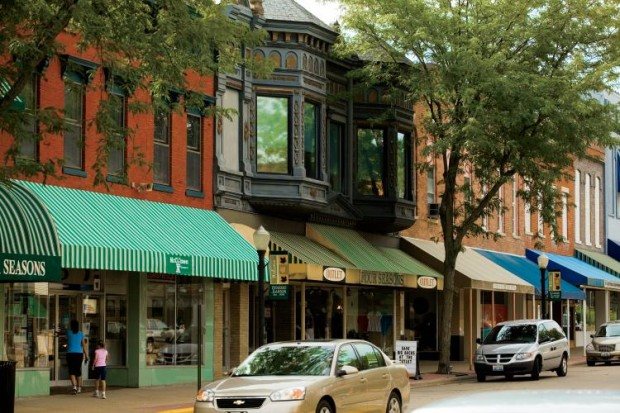
- Downtown Geneseo, Illinois

- Flag

- Location of Geneseo in Henry County, Illinois.
- Coordinates: 41°26′30″N 90°08′52″W
- Country: United States
- State: Illinois
- County: Henry
- Founded: 1836

Area
  - Total: 4.70 sq mi (12.18 km^{2})
  - Land: 4.70 sq mi (12.18 km^{2})
  - Water: 0 sq mi (0.00 km^{2})
- Elevation: 646 ft (197 m)

Population (2020)
  - Total: 6,539
  - Density: 1,390.9/sq mi (537.03/km^{2})
- Time zone: UTC-6 (CST)
  - Summer (DST): UTC-5 (CDT)
- ZIP code: 61254
- Area code: 309
- FIPS code: 17-28846
- GNIS feature ID: 2394872
- Website: www.cityofgeneseo.com

Geneseo (/dʒəˈnɛsi.oʊ/ jen-uh-SEE-oh) is a city in Henry County, Illinois, United States. As of the 2020 census, the population was 6,539. Geneseo is 20 miles east of the Quad Cities, at the intersection of Interstate 80, U.S. Route 6 and Illinois Route 82.

The city is known for its historically successful high school football and music programs. It is also known for its Victorian architecture.

== History ==
Geneseo was founded as a Christian colony in 1836 by seven families of the Congregationalist denomination from Geneseo, New York and Bergen, New York seeking to establish a "church in the wilderness". Roderick R. Stewart, one of the city's founding members, named the town Geneseo after the settlers' town of origin in New York. The name "Geneseo" is a variation of the Iroquois word Genesee, meaning "shining valley" or "beautiful valley".

=== Establishment ===
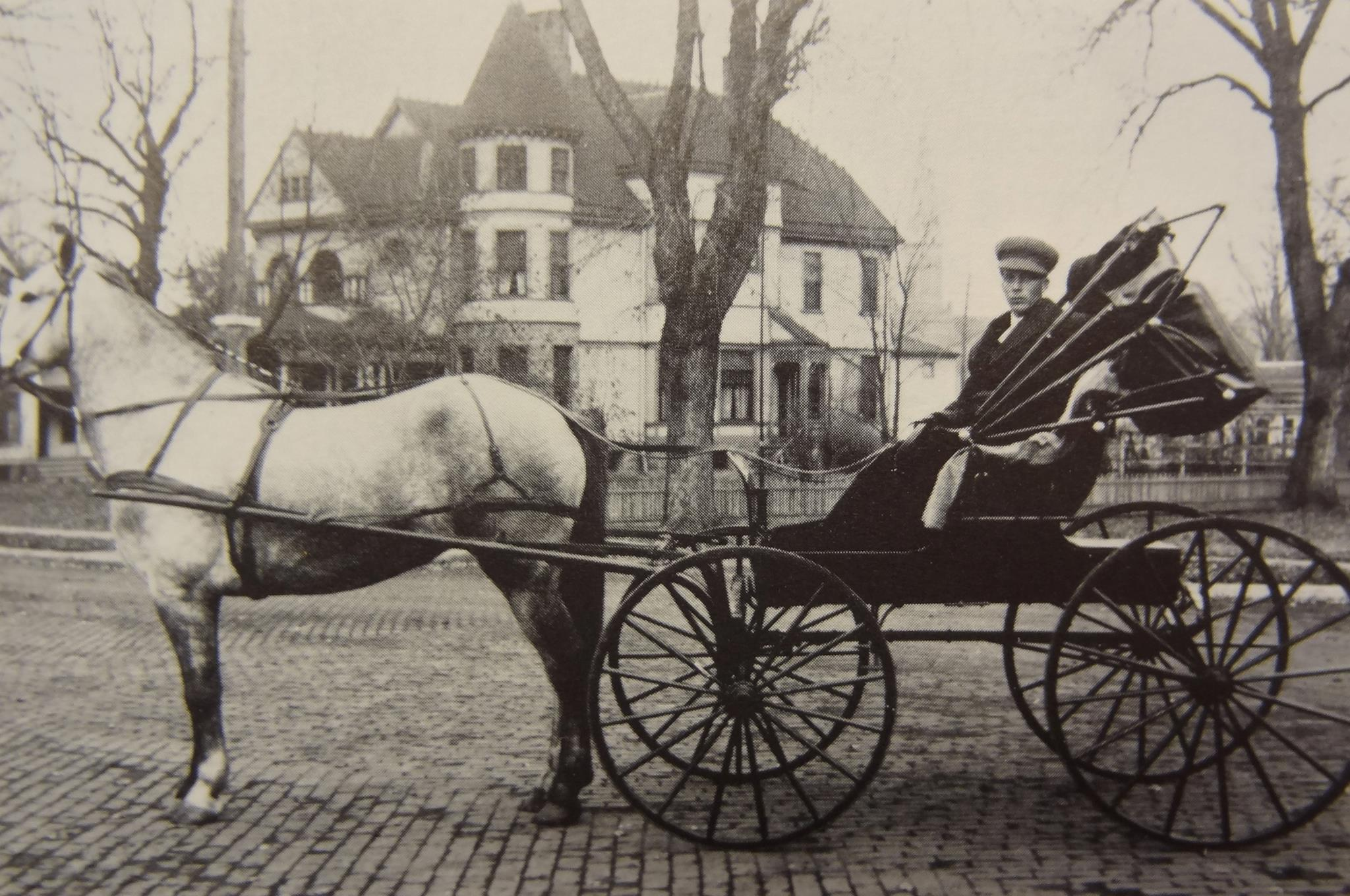
W.C. Sheppard Mansion, 1895 in Geneseo, Illinois. This lot was the location of Deacon Cone's house that was used for the Underground Railroad

Planning for the colony began as early as 1829. In May 1836 the founding seven families of Geneseo sent an exploratory committee to survey the precise location of their new community in the Old Northwest. This group, known as the "New York Committee", or "New York Group" was composed of John C. Ward, Lukas T. Seyller, and Roderick R. Stewart. Advised at a meeting in Chicago by the future Governor of Illinois, Thomas Ford, the small committee rode by wagon and horseback to investigate the 2,000-acre tract. The transaction of the land was completed in what is today Colona Township and purchased at a dollar and a quarter per acre.

On September 17, 1836, the settlers embarked on their journey from Geneseo, New York and Genesee County, New York across Canada, down through Michigan, then across Indiana and Illinois. The subsequent winter was so bad that the families remained in Princeton, Illinois and what was known as Providence County while their structures were being established. Cromwell K. Bartlett constructed the first structure just south of the town in the winter of 1836, and Elisha Cone and J.C. Ward built the first cabin and frame house in town, respectively, in 1837.

The town was split into lots by the trustees: John C. Ward, Cromwell K. Bartlett, and R.R. Stewart. They split the land into five blocks east to west and three blocks north to south with locations for a cemetery, a block for the school and church, a public square, and the "gospel lot," which, in 1846, became a seminary. Lots would be drawn by chance, assuming that the settlers would build on them, and immediately the town established its Christian and education-focused philosophy. A mandatory tithe on all proceeds (over a certain amount) was set aside to build a religious and educational seminary in the center of town, now the Geneseo City Park. This building, originally known as the Geneseo Manual Labor High School, was later renamed the Geneseo Seminary and was borne of the self-denial philosophy of the town's leaders. However, due to considerable debt, the Geneseo Seminary ended up closing in the year 1857 and was folded into the public school system as Geneseo Central School.

Further proving their religious and educational convictions, when many of the town's founding families hadn't arrived and while the remainder battled frostbite, the settlers began a temperance society in 1836 with several families in Hanna Township and Cleveland, Illinois. Construction on the original First Congregationalist Church began in 1837 and its first communion was held on April 18, 1838. The Congregationalist Church was a central fixture of the town's community in its first century.

These strong religious beliefs also strongly influenced the town's political leanings as well, being strong abolitionists and Republicans. As a result, Geneseo became a station on the Underground Railroad.

Even before the church was constructed, the first school was established when R.R. Stewart's daughter, Susannah Stewart, began teaching classes in a one-room school house in 1837. It was built with puncheon floors, round poles, and the old wagon covers they used to make the journey.

=== Expansion ===
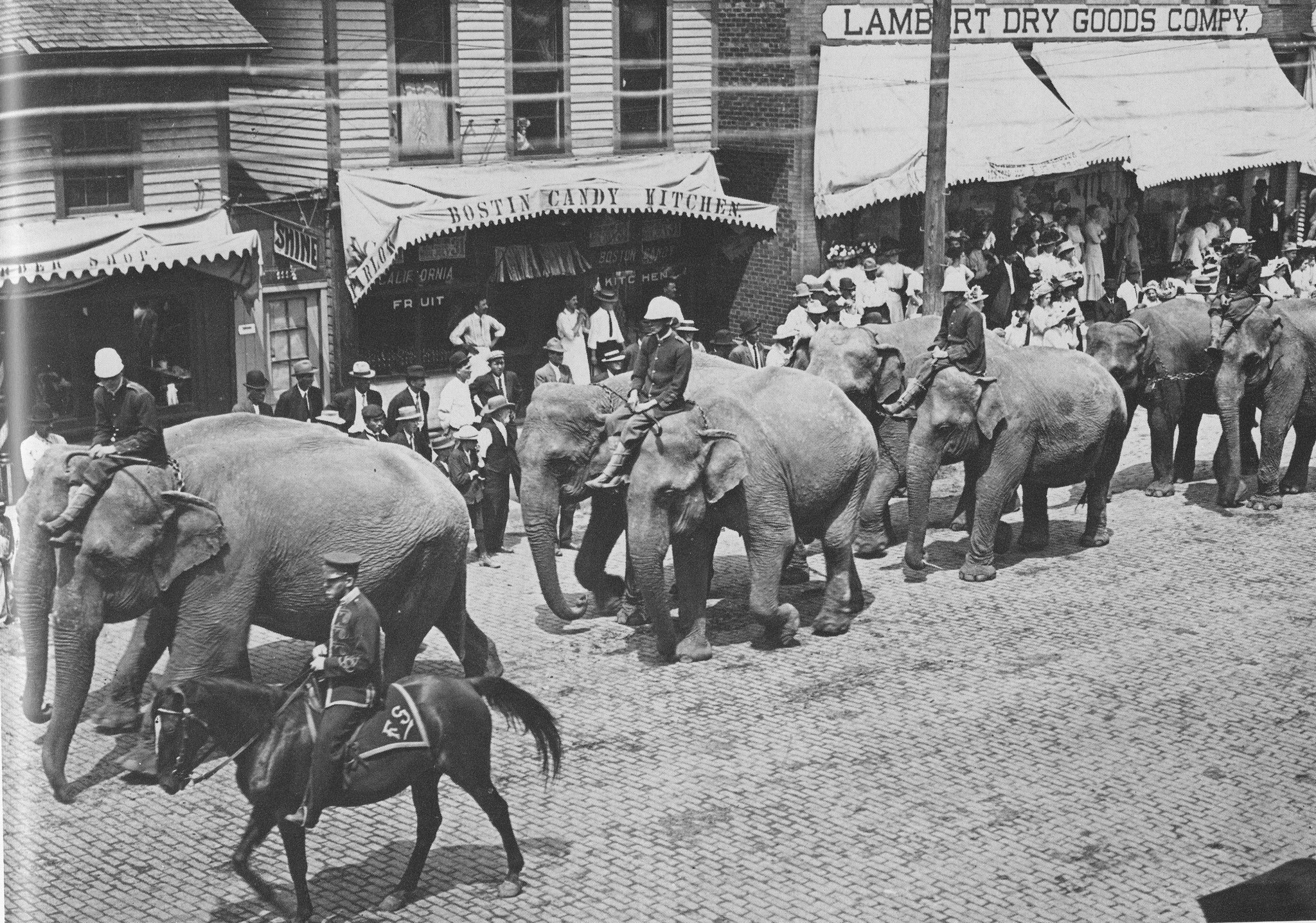
"When the circus came to town." Downtown Geneseo, Illinois circa 1890

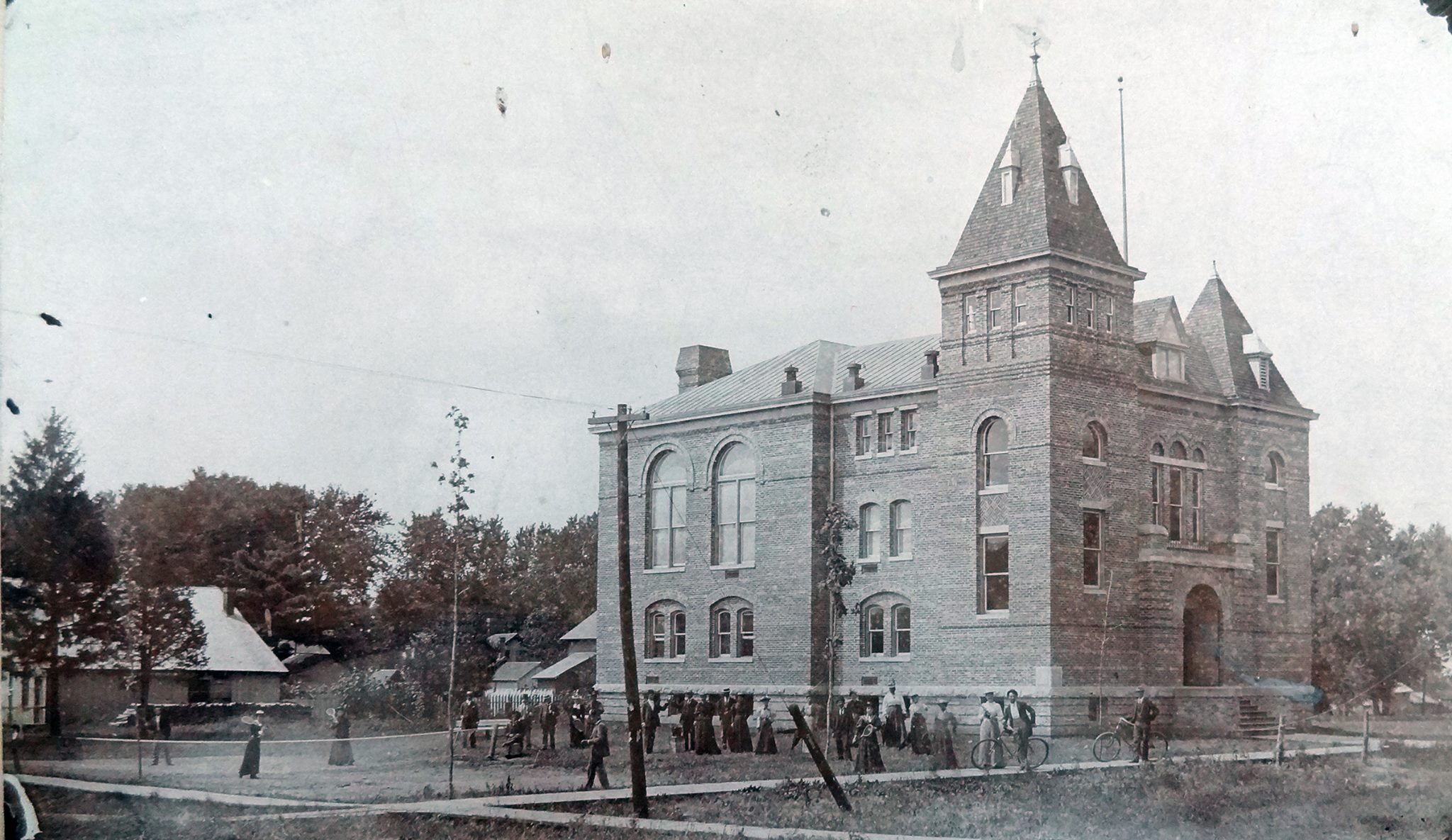
Students outside Atkinson Hall at the Geneseo Collegiate Institute, circa 1895

The Chicago, Rock Island, and Pacific Railroad, also known as the Rock Island Line, was surveyed in 1850 to run from Chicago to Rock Island with a prominent stop in Geneseo. The line was completed in June 1854 and, immediately thereafter, the Grand Excursion promotional voyage that took prominent politicians and well-off citizens on a voyage to and down the Mississippi, stopped in the small town. Although Geneseo had grown at a near stand-still since its inception, reaching only 500 persons by 1850, it soon exploded to 5,500 just 11 years later (within the 10-square mile area). Due to its large growth, Geneseo officially became a town in 1855 and a city in 1865. Like many towns that experienced a growth spurt in the middle of the 19th century, Geneseo's wealthier families constructed many of their homes in accordance with Victorian Architecture and a large number of them remain today, giving credence to the name "Victorian Geneseo."

Simultaneously with the expansion of the town, Geneseo's first newspaper, the Geneseo Democratic Standard, started in August 1855 by James Bowie. It collapsed not a year and a half later. In June 1856, I.S. Hyatt founded the Geneseo Republic and began publishing in a building on Main Street. Although founded as a Republican Party newspaper, it is no longer affiliated with any political party. It no longer in operation, leaving Geneseo without a regular print newspaper.

Geneseo Central School, the first high school in Geneseo, was built in 1856 and became coalesced with Geneseo Seminary in 1857. It was used until 1866 when the North Side Building, was constructed. It was expanded in 1871 and was demolished in 1970. South Side School, constructed by John W. Ross in 1889 on the corner of College Avenue and Second Street, became the official high school for Geneseo in 1890.

In 1883, two higher-education institutions were established in Geneseo: the Geneseo Collegiate Institute (GCI) and the Northwestern Normal School (NNS). GCI was a Presbyterian academy which housed a small religious high school for a time. Although a large expansion was planned for GCI in the early 1900s, the school financially collapsed in 1922 and was razed in 1930. The Northwestern Normal School was a secular college. It, too, collapsed financially and in 1901 John C. Hammond purchased NNS' old dormitory and presented it to the City of Geneseo to establish Hammond Henry Hospital on November 28, 1901.

=== 20th century school expansion ===
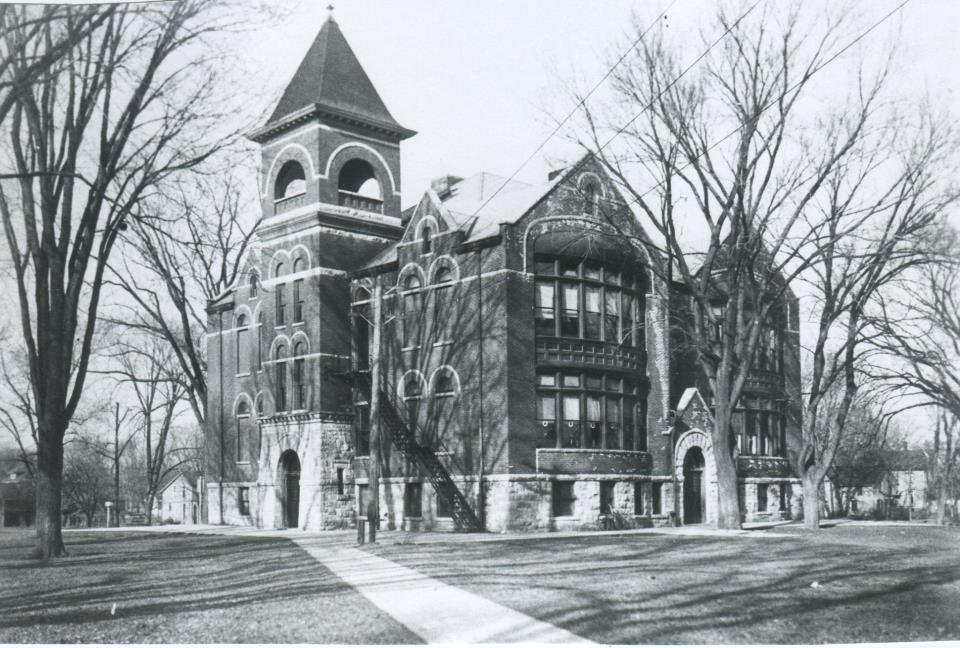
The old North Side School, Geneseo, Illinois circa 1900

In 1909 the Township High School District was established. It received a major expansion in 1932. Officially known as Township High School, it was erected between 1910 and 1911 The old South Side School was then used as an additional grade school for K-8 students until a new junior high was built in 1954. South Side was then used as an administrative building until the 1960s when it was demolished to make room for a new district unit office. In the 1960s, Geneseo High School switched places with Geneseo Junior High and became J.D. Darnall Senior High School (until reverting to Geneseo High School in 2005). The old "Township High School" was then used as Geneseo Junior High School until the 1990s when Geneseo Middle School was built next door to J.D. Darnall. Township High was subsequently demolished for additional space for the city park.

== Geography ==
According to the 2021 census gazetteer files, Geneseo has a total area of 4.70 square miles (12.17 km^{2}), all land.

=== Climate ===
Climate data for Geneseo, Illinois (1991–2020 normals, extremes 1895–present)
Month	Jan	Feb	Mar	Apr	May	Jun	Jul	Aug	Sep	Oct	Nov	Dec	Year
Record high °F (°C)	66 (19)	72 (22)	89 (32)	92 (33)	99 (37)	101 (38)	107 (42)	103 (39)	99 (37)	92 (33)	79 (26)	70 (21)	107 (42)
Mean daily maximum °F (°C)	30.8 (−0.7)	35.7 (2.1)	48.9 (9.4)	62.2 (16.8)	73.7 (23.2)	82.0 (27.8)	85.7 (29.8)	83.4 (28.6)	77.1 (25.1)	64.0 (17.8)	48.8 (9.3)	35.9 (2.2)	60.8 (16.0)
Daily mean °F (°C)	22.7 (−5.2)	27.2 (−2.7)	39.1 (3.9)	51.1 (10.6)	62.6 (17.0)	72.2 (22.3)	75.4 (24.1)	73.1 (22.8)	65.8 (18.8)	53.4 (11.9)	39.8 (4.3)	28.2 (−2.1)	50.9 (10.5)
Mean daily minimum °F (°C)	14.6 (−9.7)	18.6 (−7.4)	29.3 (−1.5)	39.9 (4.4)	51.6 (10.9)	61.5 (16.4)	65.1 (18.4)	62.9 (17.2)	54.5 (12.5)	42.9 (6.1)	30.7 (−0.7)	20.5 (−6.4)	41.0 (5.0)
Record low °F (°C)	−25 (−32)	−25 (−32)	−13 (−25)	12 (−11)	26 (−3)	37 (3)	44 (7)	40 (4)	24 (−4)	19 (−7)	−7 (−22)	−20 (−29)	−25 (−32)
Average precipitation inches (mm)	1.64 (42)	1.81 (46)	2.70 (69)	3.96 (101)	4.87 (124)	4.42 (112)	4.13 (105)	4.10 (104)	3.57 (91)	3.21 (82)	2.56 (65)	2.12 (54)	39.09 (993)
Average snowfall inches (cm)	9.8 (25)	6.1 (15)	2.8 (7.1)	0.7 (1.8)	0.0 (0.0)	0.0 (0.0)	0.0 (0.0)	0.0 (0.0)	0.0 (0.0)	0.1 (0.25)	1.6 (4.1)	7.3 (19)	28.4 (72)
Average precipitation days (≥ 0.01 in)	8.4	7.2	9.3	10.6	12.0	10.2	8.1	9.0	7.7	8.6	8.2	8.3	107.6
Average snowy days (≥ 0.1 in)	4.7	3.1	1.4	0.3	0.0	0.0	0.0	0.0	0.0	0.1	0.8	3.5	13.9
Source: NOAA

== Demographics ==
Historical population
Census	Pop.	Note	%±
1860	1,794		—
1870	3,042		69.6%
1880	3,518		15.6%
1890	3,182		−9.6%
1900	3,356		5.5%
1910	3,199		−4.7%
1920	3,375		5.5%
1930	3,406		0.9%
1940	3,824		12.3%
1950	4,325		13.1%
1960	5,169		19.5%
1970	5,538		7.1%
1980	5,780		4.4%
1990	5,995		3.7%
2000	6,480		8.1%
2010	6,586		1.6%
2020	6,539		−0.7%
U.S. Decennial Census

=== 2020 census ===
As of the 2020 census, Geneseo had a population of 6,539. The median age was 45.8 years. 22.3% of residents were under the age of 18 and 26.0% of residents were 65 years of age or older. For every 100 females there were 88.9 males, and for every 100 females age 18 and over there were 85.6 males age 18 and over.

98.1% of residents lived in urban areas, while 1.9% lived in rural areas.

There were 2,892 households in Geneseo, of which 25.9% had children under the age of 18 living in them. Of all households, 49.1% were married-couple households, 16.1% were households with a male householder and no spouse or partner present, and 30.2% were households with a female householder and no spouse or partner present. About 34.5% of all households were made up of individuals and 19.7% had someone living alone who was 65 years of age or older.

There were 3,122 housing units, of which 7.4% were vacant. The homeowner vacancy rate was 2.7% and the rental vacancy rate was 5.1%.

Racial composition as of the 2020 census
Race	Number	Percent
White	6,050	92.5%
Black or African American	32	0.5%
American Indian and Alaska Native	13	0.2%
Asian	47	0.7%
Native Hawaiian and Other Pacific Islander	3	0.0%
Some other race	57	0.9%
Two or more races	337	5.2%
Hispanic or Latino (of any race)	209	3.2%

=== Income and poverty ===
The median income for a household in the city was $56,211, and the median income for a family was $75,172. Males had a median income of $57,426 versus $26,359 for females. The per capita income for the city was $32,169. About 4.4% of families and 5.5% of the population were below the poverty line, including 12.0% of those under age 18 and 1.3% of those age 65 or over.

== Economy ==
Geneseo is home to corn hybrid seed producer Wyffels Hybrids and gun manufacturing company Springfield Armory, Inc.

== Arts and culture ==
Annual community events include Geneseo Music Festival, and Geneseo Christmas Walk.

== Government ==
The city government is organized under a aldermanic form. The mayor is elected at large for a two-year term. The mayor, Sean Johnson, is chief executive officer and presiding officer over the city council. The city council consists of eight aldermen representing four individual wards.

== Education ==
Geneseo Community Unit School District 228 includes Geneseo High School.

== Infrastructure ==
Downtown Geneseo will be a stop on the Chicago to Quad Cities Amtrak expansion.

== Notable people ==
- Earnest Elmo Calkins, advertising executive
- Agnes Meyer Driscoll, cryptanalyst
- William O. "Doc" Farber, noted American Political Scientist
- Judith Ford, Miss America, 1969
- Edith Dunham Foster, educational filmmaker
- Butch Patrick, actor famous for his portrayal of Eddie Munster.
- Barry Pearson, NFL wide receiver for the Pittsburgh Steelers and Kansas City Chiefs
- Leon Alaric Shafer, painter and illustrator
- Todd Sieben, Illinois State Senator
- Jack Wanner, MLB shortstop for the New York Highlanders
