= Leon Alaric Shafer =

American painter, etcher and illustrator

Leon Alaric Shafer (1866, Geneseo, Illinois–1940) was an American painter, etcher and illustrator.

Shafer was born in Illinois, but spent most of his life living in New Rochelle, New York.

He exhibited his work at the Art Institute of Chicago in 1897 and 1905.

== Illustrations ==
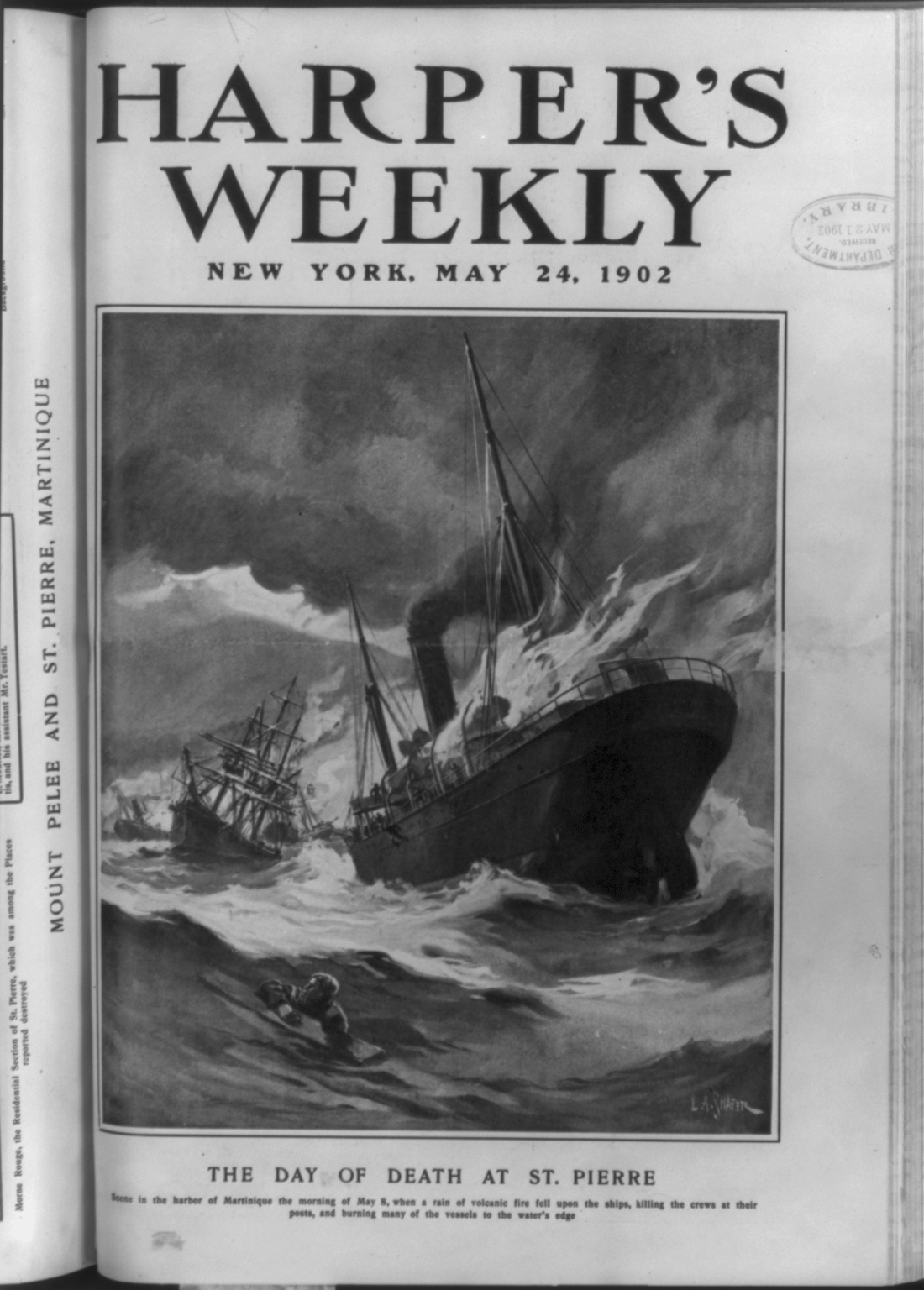
Harper's Weekly, 24 May 1902, featuring the destruction of Saint-Pierre, Martinique

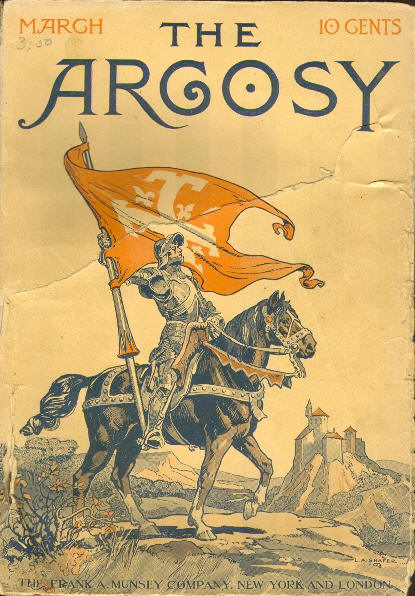
The Argosy, March 1910

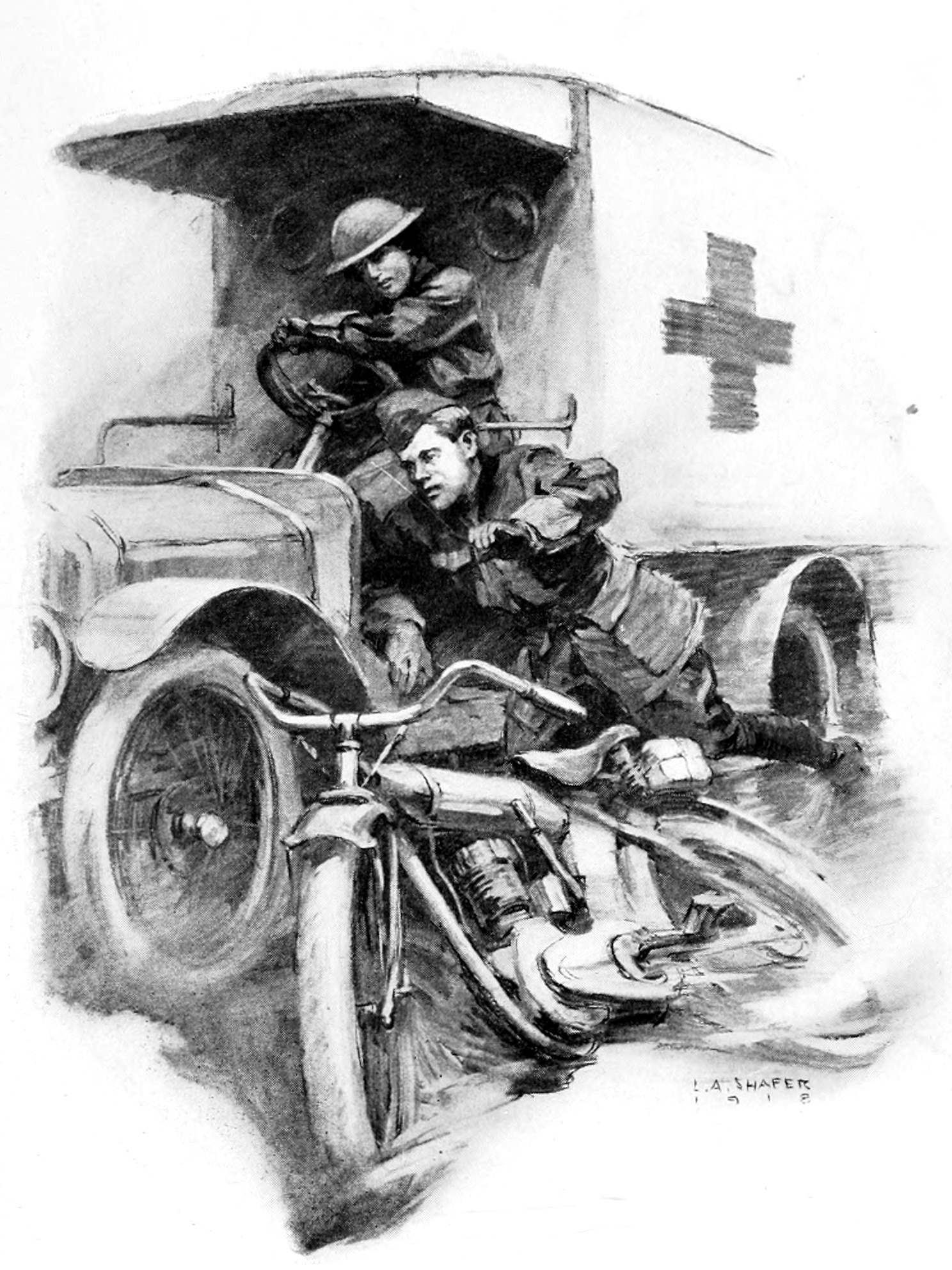
Illustration for Tam o' the Scoots, 1919

== Posters ==
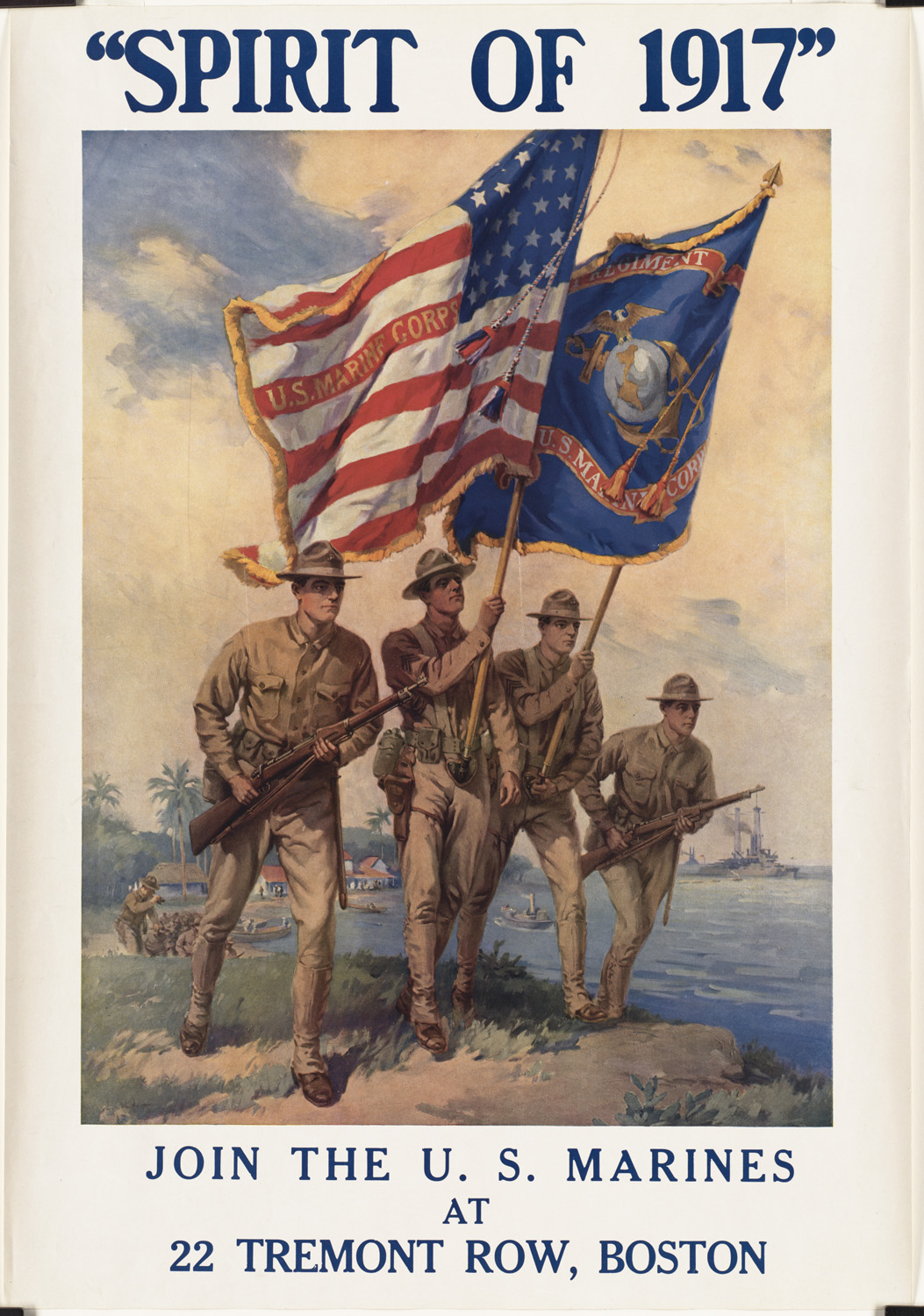
Spirit of 1917

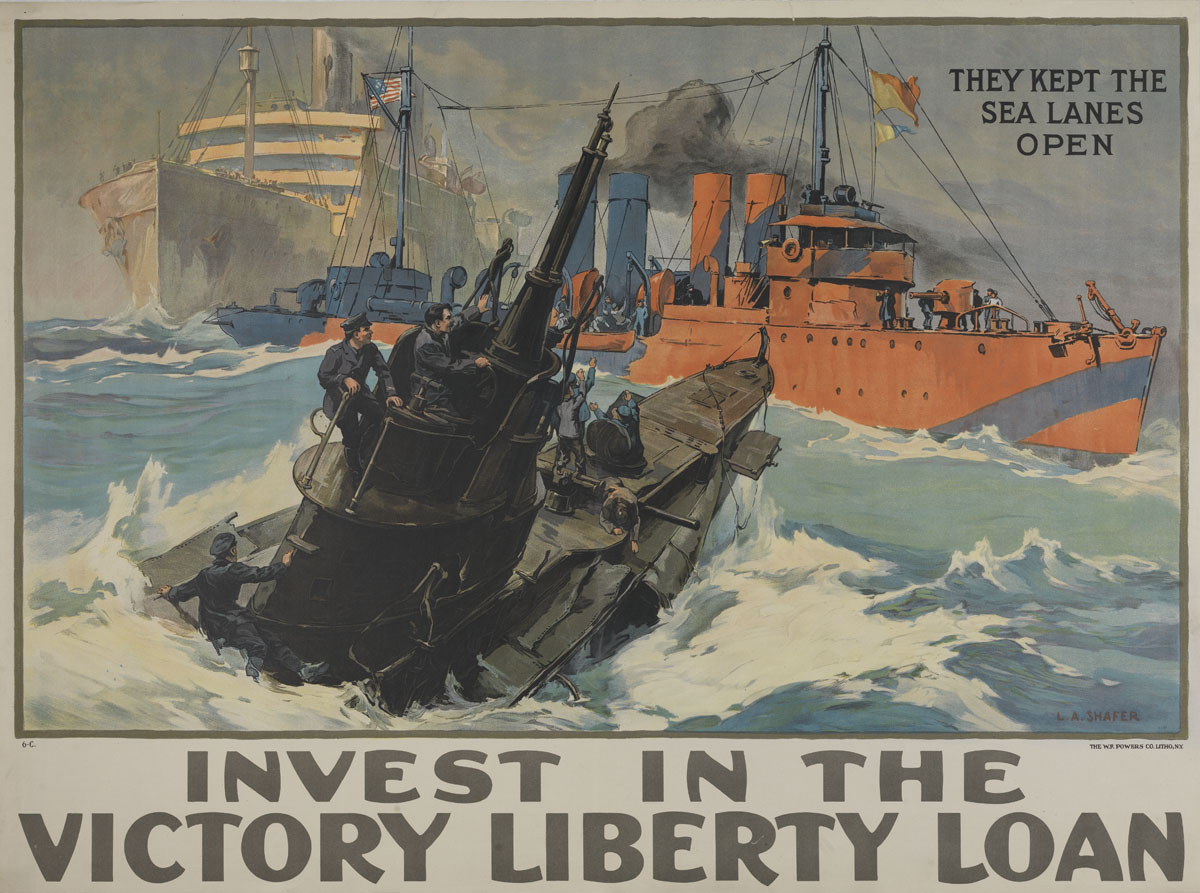
Invest in the Victory Liberty Loan

Sunday Herald Poster, 1896

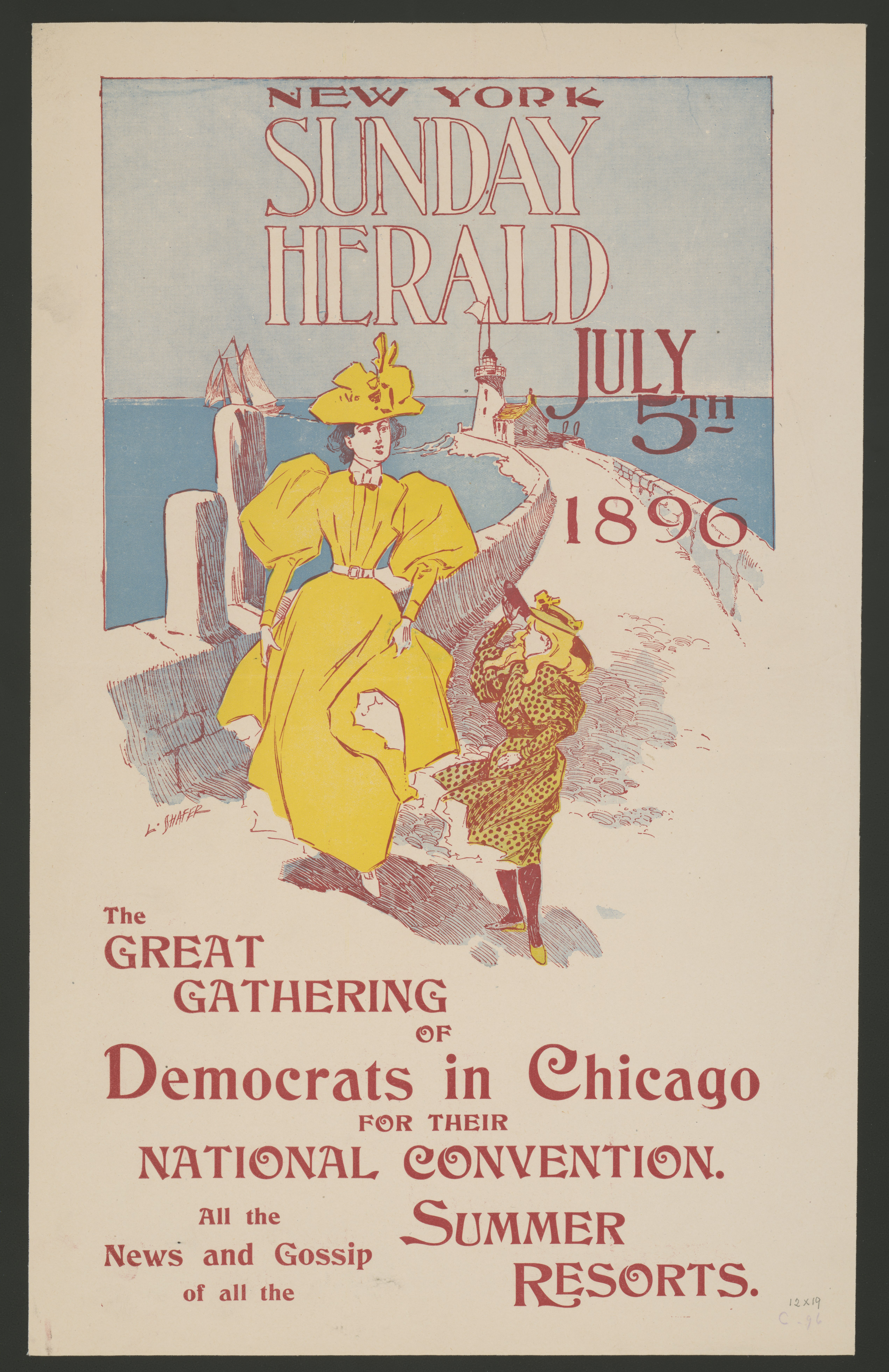
Sunday Herald poster, 1897
