= Florence Ripley Mastin =

American poet and teacher

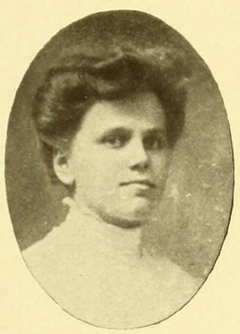
- Mastin, from the Class of 1908 yearbook of Barnard College
- Born: Florence Josephine Mastin; March 18, 1886; Wayne, Pennsylvania
- Died: February 23, 1968 (aged 81); Piermont, New York or Nyack, New York
- Education: Barnard College
- Occupations: Writer, poet
- Partner: Grace Beatrice MacColl
- Relatives: George Ripley (ancestor)
- Writing career
- Notable awards: Freedom Foundation Medal

Florence Ripley Mastin (March 18, 1886 – February 23, 1968) was an American poet and teacher. Her work appeared regularly in The New York Times and other publications, and her "Freedom's Dream" was chosen as the official poem of New York State's observance of the Hudson-Champlain 350th Celebration in 1960.

== Early life and education ==
Florence Josephine Mastin was born on March 18, 1886, in Wayne, Pennsylvania, and grew up in Piermont, New York, the daughter of William Francis Mastin and Florence Amelia Wells Mastin. She earned a bachelor's degree at Barnard College in 1908. In her twenties she changed her middle name from Josephine to Ripley, which was her maternal grandmother's maiden name. She was descended from reformer and critic George Ripley.

== Career ==
Mastin taught English at Erasmus Hall High School. She wrote a school song for Erasmus Hall in 1915. Mastin published her first book of poetry, Green Leaves, in 1918. Mastin's poem "Freedom's Dream" won the Freedom Foundation Medal in 1959 and in 1960 was made New York State's official poem for the observance of the Hudson-Champlain 350th Celebration.

== Publications ==
Mastin's poems were published in The New York Times, Poetry, The Survey, Unity, Current History, Labor Digest, and many others. She published several collections of her poetry.

- Green Leaves (1918)
- Cables of Cobweb (1935)
- Over the Tappen Zee (1962)

== Personal life and legacy ==
Mastin and her widowed mother lived together for many years. After her mother's death in 1943, Mastin and her Barnard classmate Grace Beatrice MacColl lived together as partners. MacColl died in 1959, and Mastin died on February 23, 1968, in New York, at the age of 81.

There is a collection of her papers at Syracuse University. In 1972 students in Nyack studied works by Mastin before a bicycling trip.
