= Herbert Rosinski =

The Development of Naval Thought: Essays by Herbert Rosinski.

Herbert Rosinski (30 January 1903 – 27 February 1962) was a German and later American military historian.

== Early life and career ==
He was born to Dr. Bernhard Rosinski, a professor at the University of Königsberg, and Sophie Leo Rosinski. He studied history at the Royal Wilhelms Academy and was then educated at the universities of Tübingen, Konigsberg and Berlin, where he studied history, archaeology and Egyptology.

From 1925 Rosinski studied Japanese language and civilization at Berlin University and graduated with distinction in 1927. He was awarded a PhD in 1930 for his dissertation on Japan's policy of autarky. He delivered lectures at the Mürwik Naval School and Oxford University. In 1936 Rosinski emigrated to Britain after he was banned from academia because of his Jewish ancestry. He received a grant from the Julian Corbett Prize Fund to study the naval warfare theorists Julian Corbett, Alfred Thayer Mahan and Raoul Castex. Upon the outbreak of the Second World War in 1939 he was interned as an enemy alien.

In 1940 he emigrated to the United States and was appointed at the Institute for Advanced Study in Princeton, New Jersey. He lectured and contributed articles to academic journals on military subjects. During 1948–1949 he visited India where he lectured to Indian Army Generals and interviewed Prime Minister Jawaharlal Nehru. During the 1950s Rosinski lectured at the National War College and the Naval War College in Newport, Rhode Island.

== Personal life ==
In 1934 he married Maria-Luise Tripp.

== Works ==
- The German Army (London: The Hogarth Press, 1939; rev. ed. published by the Infantry Journal Inc., 1944).
- The Development of Naval Thought: Essays by Herbert Rosinski (Newport, Rhode Island: Naval War College Press, 1977).
