= Mississippi Athletic Conference =

Iowa High School athletic conference

- Conference: IHSAA / IGHSAU
- Founded: 1978
- Sports fielded: 21; men's: 11; women's: 10
- No. of teams: 10
- Region: Quad Cities
- Official website: www.mississippiathleticconference.org

The Mississippi Athletic Conference (MAC Conference, or MAC) is a high school athletic conference whose members are located in the Iowa Quad-Cities, plus three other schools in eastern Iowa.

== Member schools ==
There are ten full members of the Mississippi Athletic Conference. For the 2024-2025 school year, seven of those schools will be in Class 4A for boys' and girls' sports and Class 4A, Iowa's largest enrollment classes (in sports where a four-class system for post-season competition is used). The smallest — Davenport Assumption — is in Class 3A (the second largest among Iowa's four enrollment classes) and has switched between Class 3A and 4A for girls' sports (in a five-class system, with Class 5A being the largest).

Newest member Central DeWitt competes in Class 3A for boys' sports and Class 4A for girls' sports, and competes in Class 4A boys' golf. Starting with the 2024-2025 school year, Clinton will be a Class 3A school as the state's 49th largest school; the largest 48 schools are Class 4A, with the next 64 competing in Class 3A. Clinton and North Scott have, along with Central DeWitt, competed in Class 4A for girls sports (in volleyball, basketball and softball, which used the five-class system).

All conference schools compete in Class 4A for boys' golf, which is contested in the fall. (The state's smaller schools compete in the spring.)

Institution	Location	Mascot	Colors	Affiliation	2026-2027 BEDS	Joined	Previous conference
Assumption Catholic	Davenport	Knights		Private	403	1978	Quad City Metro
Bettendorf	Bettendorf	Bulldogs		Public	991	1978	Mississippi Valley
Central DeWitt	DeWitt	Sabers		Public	381	2020	WaMaC Conference
Clinton	Clinton	River Kings/River Queens		Public	772	1978	Mississippi Valley
Central	Davenport	Blue Devils		Public	961	1978	Quad City Metro
North	Davenport	Wildcats		Public	764	1985	none (new school)
West	Davenport	Falcons		Public	875	1978	Quad City Metro
Muscatine	Muscatine	Muskies		Public	966	1978	Mississippi Valley
North Scott	Eldridge	Lancers		Public	843	1978	Big Bend
Pleasant Valley	Bettendorf	Spartans		Public	1,328	1985	Big Bend

== Sports ==
The conference offers the following sports:

- Fall — Football, volleyball, boys' cross-country, girls' cross-country, boys' golf and girls' swimming.
- Winter — Boys' basketball, girls' basketball, wrestling and boys' swimming. Bowling was added in 2006-2007.
- Spring — Boys' track and field, girls' track and field, boys' soccer, girls' soccer, boys' tennis, girls' tennis and girls' golf.
- Summer — Baseball and softball.

Although the member schools field freshman — and in some cases, junior varsity — teams in many of the above-mentioned sports, conference championships are determined at sophomore and varsity levels only. Also, not all schools field teams in every sport (e.g., North Scott does not have its own swimming teams).

== History ==
The MAC — as it is known to locals — was formed in 1978. Charter members Bettendorf, Clinton and Muscatine had been members of the Mississippi Valley Conference, while Davenport schools Assumption, Central and West were part of the Quad-City Metro Conference. North Scott, which was participating in its first "big school" conference, had been in the Big Bend Conference (along with several smaller schools), and Burlington was not affiliated with any conference. At the time, the conference was known as the "Mississippi Eight."

Davenport North opened its doors in 1985 and was immediately admitted to the newly renamed MAC. Pleasant Valley became a part-time member in 1985, although it didn't compete in football, basketball, wrestling, baseball or softball until 1987 when the school became a full-fledged member.

The MAC's membership remained stable for more than three decades, until Burlington announced plans to leave the conference and join the Southeast Conference, a league of five schools whose locations were much closer to Burlington than conference schools in the MAC. In April 2018, a vote of league representatives approved Burlington's request to leave following the 2018-2019 school year and join the Southeast Conference, leaving the MAC with nine schools.

In April 2019, principals from the remaining nine MAC schools voted to admit Central DeWitt, bringing the league back to 10 schools. Upon them joining the league in the fall of 2020, Central DeWitt would be the smallest public school in the conference—firmly Class 3A in a league of otherwise primarily Class 4A schools—with only Davenport Assumption having a smaller enrollment.

School	Joined	Consolidations	Conference Came From
Bettendorf	1978	n/a	Mississippi Valley Conference
Burlington†	1978	n/a	independent
Central DeWitt	2020	DeWitt, Grand Mound and Welton (1961)	WaMaC Conference
Clinton	1978	Lyons (1954)	Mississippi Valley Conference
Davenport Assumption	1978	(previously St. Ambrose Academy through 1958)	Quad-City Metro
Davenport Central	1978	n/a	Quad-City Metro
Davenport North	1985	n/a	n/a
Davenport West	1978	n/a	Quad-City Metro
Muscatine	1978	Montpelier (1970s)	Mississippi Valley Conference
North Scott	1978	(no high school before 1958)	Big Bend Conference
Pleasant Valley	1987	Le Claire (1966)	independent

† Left conference in 2019.

=== End of MAC conference for football ===
2013 was the last year that the ten schools played each other for football. The teams were switched to district play in the fall of 2014 with Pleasant Valley being the last MAC football champions.

=== Rivalries with Illinois Western Big 6 ===
In December, seven MAC teams — Davenport North, Davenport West, Davenport Central, Davenport Assumption, North Scott, Bettendorf and Pleasant Valley — compete in the annual Genesis PSP Shootout, a competition matching the Iowa schools against teams from the Illinois Quad-Cities. The Illinois teams are Moline, United Township (of East Moline), Rock Island, Rock Island Alleman, Geneseo and Galesburg, all representing the Western Big 6 Conference; the other participating team is Riverdale of Port Byron, Illinois. No champion is crowned, although matchups are generally determined based on pre-season polls and past successes of the competing teams, with the two teams believed to be the "best" in the pre-season polls playing in the last game of the day.

A similar seven-game shootout competition for the girls takes place in January at Wharton Field House in Moline; the same six MAC schools compete against the metro Western Big Six schools, plus Geneseo and other schools from western Illinois. MVPs are named for each game. Starting with the 2017-2018 season, a dual team wrestling tournament between metro MAC and Western Big Six schools was started, with the state winner determined by the average dual meet score from schools from a given state.

In March, after the conclusion of the state basketball tournaments in Iowa and Illinois, an all-star game consisting of the area's top senior players is played at Augustana College, with seniors from primarily the MAC matched against their counterparts from the Western Big Six. Boys and girls games are played, with an MVP named for each game. Similar Iowa-vs.-Illinois all-star contests are contested for volleyball, boys' and girls' soccer, baseball and softball.
