= Mississippi Valley Conference (Iowa) =

High school athletic conference in Iowa

- Conference: IHSAA / IGHSAU
- Founded: 1927
- Sports fielded: 21
- No. of teams: 15
- Region: Eastern Iowa
- Website: Official website

Mississippi Valley Conference
- Conference: IHSAA / IGHSAU
- Founded: 1927
- Sports fielded: 21; men's: 11; women's: 10
- No. of teams: 15
- Region: Eastern Iowa
- Website: Official website

The Mississippi Valley Conference (also called MVC) is a high-school athletic conference whose members are located in the metropolitan areas of eastern region of the U.S. state of Iowa, including Cedar Rapids, Dubuque, Iowa City and Waterloo-Cedar Falls.

The conference is divided into two divisions: the Mississippi division and the Valley division. Division assignments rotate every two years, and are not geographically-based.

At present the MVC comprises all 4A schools with the exception of Dubuque Wahlert, which is categorized as 3A school. Cedar Rapids Xavier, when admitted to the MVC, was a 3A school, but became a 4A school beginning with the 2008-09 school year. As of 2014-2015, Xavier switched back to 3A and Western Dubuque high school, also a 3A school, beginning in 2019.

== Member schools ==
There are 15 member schools of the Mississippi Valley Conference:

=== Mississippi Division ===
School	Location	Affiliation	Mascot	Colors	Year Founded	2026-2027 BEDS
Washington	Cedar Rapids	Public	Warriors		1957 (orig. 1857)	819
Hempstead	Dubuque	Public	Mustangs		1970	1,024
Dubuque Senior	Dubuque	Public	Rams		1923 (orig. 1858)	1,058
City High	Iowa City	Public	Little Hawks		1937	1,245
Liberty	North Liberty	Public	Lightning		2017	1,023
Prairie	Cedar Rapids	Public	Hawks		1956	1,371
Waterloo United	Waterloo	Public	Titans		2026	1,980
Xavier	Cedar Rapids	Private	Saints		1998	491

Mississippi Division

=== Valley Division ===
School	Location	Affiliation	Mascot	Colors	Year Founded	2026-2027 BEDS
Cedar Falls	Cedar Falls	Public	Tigers		1954 (orig. 1900)	1,346
Jefferson	Cedar Rapids	Public	J-Hawks		1958	1,141
Kennedy	Cedar Rapids	Public	Cougars		1967	1,210
West	Iowa City	Public	Trojans/Women of Troy		1968	1,116
Linn-Mar	Marion	Public	Lions		1959	1,688
Western Dubuque	Epworth	Public	Bobcats		1962	732
Wahlert Catholic	Dubuque	Private	Golden Eagles		1959	354

Valley Division

== History ==
Since its founding, the Mississippi Valley Conference was a league composed of metropolitan schools in eastern Iowa. Until 1969, the MVC (as it is known to some locals) also included Quad-City area schools in both Iowa and Illinois; this list included Davenport High (since 1960, Davenport Central) and Davenport West in Iowa; and Illinois Quad-City area schools East Moline (now United Township), Moline and Rock Island. Clinton High School was also a member of the conference, as were Jefferson and Washington of Cedar Rapids, Iowa City High and Dubuque Senior (known for years simply as Dubuque). Cedar Rapids Kennedy joined immediately upon its opening in 1967.

The league was reorganized in 1969, with the five Quad-City area schools leaving to form a new league (the Quad-City Metro Conference, along with Catholic schools Davenport Assumption and Rock Island Alleman). The six remaining schools were joined by newcomers Bettendorf, Muscatine and Iowa City West (the latter which opened in 1968). Early in 1970, the newly opened Dubuque Hempstead was admitted to the conference.

One member - Muscatine - gained infamy during the 1970s when it lost 44 consecutive football games, including 40 straight league games between 1973 and 1977.^{1}

The league reorganized again in 1978 when Bettendorf, Clinton and Muscatine left to join the newly formed Mississippi Athletic Conference; Dubuque Wahlert joined at that time to make the MVC an eight-team conference.

Linn-Mar and Cedar Rapids Prairie leave the disbanded East Iowa Conference and join the Mississippi Valley conference for 1986-87 school year

Waterloo East, Waterloo West, Cedar Falls, and Cedar Rapids Regis joined the conference in 1992. Regis was later merged with Cedar Rapids LaSalle High School to form Cedar Rapids Xavier High School. Periodically conference membership is reviewed based on school population trends.^{2}

In 2016, Liberty, a new high school part of the Iowa City Community School District, applied for membership in the Mississippi Valley Conference. In January 2017, Western Dubuque accepted an invitation to join the league, joining from the WaMaC Conference. The additions became effective with the 2018-2019 school year, marking the first expansion of the conference since 1992, with the only change coming in 1998 with Xavier's opening.

In the spring of 2021, Waterloo East's request to depart the conference after the 2021-2022 school year was approved by the Waterloo School District, to join the new Iowa Alliance Conference that also includes 10 former Central Iowa Metro League schools. East's move came after a trend where the Trojans ranked near or at the bottom of the conference's all-sports rankings as well as decreasing sports participation. Waterloo West did not pursue a change at this time, and no other MVC school has made an indication of plans to switch to any new conference.

On November 20, 2023, Waterloo Community School District announced a proposal to combine East High and West High into one singular high school, citing stagnant to declining enrollment, rising costs, and an imbalance between the two schools. It was put to a vote to the community, passing on November 5, 2024. On October 8, 2025, the identity of the new high school was announced as Waterloo United High School. The mascot would be the Titans, and the colors would be obsidian black, victory gold, foundry gray, and blizzard white. The school is scheduled to be completed with construction and open for students at the beginning of the 2028 school year, however the athletic teams will begin competing under the new school in 2026. Waterloo United will play initially in the Mississippi Valley Conference, taking the place of Waterloo West. Once the physical school opens, the school district has laid the possibility of relocating to a difference conference.

== Sports ==
The conference offers the following sports:

- Fall — Football, volleyball, boys' cross-country, girls' cross-country, boys' golf and girls' swimming.
- Winter — Boys' basketball, girls' basketball, bowling, wrestling and boys' swimming.
- Spring — Boys' track and field, girls' track and field, boys' soccer, girls' soccer, boys' tennis, girls' tennis and girls' golf.
- Summer — Baseball and softball.

Although the member schools field freshman — and in some cases, junior varsity — teams in many of the above-mentioned sports, conference championships are determined at sophomore and varsity levels only.

== In other states ==
Two other states have high-school athletic conferences named Mississippi Valley Conference. In Illinois, the Mississippi Valley Conference is a conference based in the Metro East area, the eastern suburbs of St. Louis, Missouri. In Wisconsin, the Mississippi Valley Conference is a conference based in the La Crosse area, commonly known as the Coulee Region.
