= Western Big 6 Conference =

High school conference in Illinois, US

- Conference: IHSA
- No. of teams: 8
- Region: West Central Illinois

The Western Big 6 Conference is a high school conference in western central Illinois. The conference participates in athletics and activities in the Illinois High School Association (IHSA). The conference comprises public high schools with large enrollments, as well a private school, in the Illinois Quad Cities, Galesburg, Illinois, and Quincy, Illinois.

== Current membership ==
Western Big 6 Conference Members (clickable map)

School	Location (Population)	Mascot	Colors	2019-20 Enrollment	IHSA Classes 2/3/4	IHSA Music Class	IHSA Football Class	IHSA Cheerleading Class
Alleman High School	Rock Island, IL (57,108)	Pioneers		435 / 709.50 (multiplied)	A/1A/2A	B	4A	Medium squad
Galesburg High School	Galesburg, IL (30,052)	Silver Streaks		1,284	AA/2A/3A	AA	6A	Medium squad
Geneseo High School	Geneseo, IL (6,539)	Maple Leafs		840.5	AA/2A/3A	A	4A	Medium squad
Moline High School	Moline, IL (42,985)	Maroons		2,061	AA/3A/4A	AA	7A	Large squad
Quincy High School	Quincy, IL (39,463)	Blue Devils		1,788	AA/3A/4A	AA	7A	Large Squad
Rock Island High School	Rock Island, IL (57,108)	Rocks		1,626	AA/2A/3A	A	6A	Medium squad
Sterling High School	Sterling, IL (14,782)	Golden Warriors		1,021	AA/2A/3A	A	5A	Medium squad
United Township High School	East Moline, IL (21,374)	Panthers		1,666	AA/3A/4A	AA	6A	Medium squad

Sources:IHSA Conferences and IHSA Member Schools Directory

== History ==
The Western Big 6 Conference was established in 1969. The conference consisted of four schools from the Quad Cities area, one from Quincy, and one from Galesburg. The charter members were Moline High School, Rock Island High School, Rock Island Alleman High School, United Township High School (East Moline), Quincy Senior High School, and Galesburg High School. Enrollments have ranged from over 2000 students, to Alleman, the league's only private school, with about 300.

Prior to the advent of the Western Big 6 Conference, the schools of the present day conference are known to have participated in several other conferences:

- Quincy participated in Mississippi Valley Conference from 1922 to 1923 along with Macomb, Carthage, Fort Madison (IA), Keokuk (IA), and Pittsfield. Quincy also participated in the Tri State Conference from 1932 to 1935 along with Macomb, Canton (MO), Fort Madison (IA), Hannibal (MO), Keokuk (IA), Kirksville (MO).
- Canton, East Moline, Galesburg, Kewanee, Moline and Rock Island participated in football at various times in the early 1950s under the Northwest Conference (Near) banner. 1956 was the final season for the conference.
- East Moline, Moline and Rock Island participated in the Quad Cities Metro Conference, along with Davenport Central and (after 1960) Davenport West, throughout the 1950s and 1960s. Rock Island Alleman joined in 1969 (as did Davenport Assumption from the Iowa side). The 1977–1978 school year was the last for the competition in this conference.
- Simultaneous with the Quad Cities Metro Conference, East Moline, Moline and Rock Island were members of the Mississippi Valley Conference. In addition to Davenport Central and (after 1960) Davenport West, Iowa schools from Cedar Rapids, Clinton and Dubuque were also part of this conference.
- More of an association than a league or conference for football, the Illini Conference organization featured Bartonville Limestone, Canton, East Peoria, Galesburg, Kewanee, Pekin, Peoria Richwoods, and Peoria Woodruff at various times in the 1950s and 1960s. The league's members never played a complete round robin schedule in football and most played concurrently in other conferences. The final season for football in the Illini was 1971.
- Starting in 2019–2020 season Geneseo High School and Sterling High School joined the conference in all activities.

School	Years	Consolidations	Conference Came From	State Championships (1969–Present)
Alleman High School	1969–Present	n/a	Unknown	7
Galesburg High School	1969–Present	n/a	Illini	2
Geneseo High School	2019–Present	Atkinson High School (1988)	NIB-12	-
Moline High School	1969–Present	1952 Coal Valley	Mississippi Valley	9
Quincy High School	1969–Present	n/a	Unknown	9
Rock Island High School	1969–Present	n/a	Mississippi Valley	5
Sterling High School	2019–Present	N/A	NIB-12	3
United Township High School	1969–Present	1920 Silvis	Mississippi Valley	3

== Competitive success ==
The present-day Western Big 6 Conference has won 38 state championships in IHSA-sponsored athletics and activities:

- Boys Baseball (Galesburg 1987–1988)
- Boys Basketball (Galesburg 1912–1913; Quincy 1980–1981; Rock Island 2010–2011; Moline 2022–2023)
- Boys Cross Country (Alleman 2004–2005)
- Boys Golf (Galesburg 1971–1972; Quincy 1990–1991)
- Boys Soccer (United Township 1999–2000)
- Boys Tennis (Moline 1992–1993)
- Boys Track and Field (Rock Island 1960–1961, 1988–1989, 1993–1994)
- Boys Wrestling (Rock Island 1966–1967; Moline 1995–1996)
- Chess (Moline 1993–1994, 1994–1995; Rock Island 1977–1978)
- Drama (Rock Island 2008–2009)
- Fishing (Moline 2013–2014)
- Girls Basketball (Alleman 2004–2005)
- Girls Bowling (United Township 1990–1991; Galesburg High School 2020–2021)
- Girls Golf (Quincy 1976–1977, 1977–1978, 1978–1979)
- Girls Softball (Alleman 1984–85, 1991–92, 1992–1993, 1993–1994, 1997–1998, 2013–2014; Moline 1986–1987, 1987–1988, 1993–1994, 1995–1996, 2005–2006, 2010–2011; Quincy 1977–1978)
- Girls Track and Field (Rock Island 2008–2009; United Township 1976–1977)
- Girls Volleyball (Sterling 2019–2020)
- Music Sweepstakes (Moline 1999–2000)
- Scholastic Bowl (Quincy 1986–1987, 1987–1988, 1992–1993)
