= Davenport High School =

Davenport High School is the name of several high schools in the United States:

- Davenport Central High School (est. 1904), this was the school commonly referred to as "Davenport High School" prior to Davenport, Iowa's decentralization of the school district
- Davenport North High School (est. 1985), in Davenport, Iowa
- Davenport West High School (est. 1960), in Davenport, Iowa
- Davenport Mid City High School (est. 2014), in Davenport, Iowa
- Davenport High School (Oklahoma), in Davenport, Oklahoma
- Davenport High School (Washington), in Davenport, Washington
- Davenport High School (Texas), in Garden Ridge, Texas
- Davenport High School (Florida), in Davenport, Florida
