= Clinton Community School District (Iowa) =

Public school district in Clinton, Iowa, United States

Coordinates: 41.857742°N 90.219947°W

Location
- Clinton, Iowa Clinton County United States
- Coordinates: 41.857742, -90.219947

District information
- Type: Local school district
- Grades: K-12
- Established: 1835
- Superintendent: Gary DeLacy
- Schools: 6
- Budget: $58,028,000 (2020-21)
- NCES District ID: 1907710

Students and staff
- Students: 3,444 (2022-23)
- Teachers: 259.73 FTE
- Staff: 289.94 FTE
- Student–teacher ratio: 13.26
- Athletic conference: Mississippi Athletic Conference
- District mascot: River Kings/River Queens
- Colors: Red and Black

Other information
- Website: clinton.k12.ia.us

Clinton Community School District is a public school district headquartered in Clinton, Iowa, serving that city and being located in Clinton County.

== Schools ==
Secondary

- Clinton High School
- Clinton Middle School

Primary

- Bluff Elementary School
- Eagle Heights Elementary School
- Jefferson Elementary School
- Whittier Elementary School

The Eagle Heights school replaced the former Elijah Buell and Horace Mann schools. By 2008, the district was auctioning off the schools.

== See also ==
- List of school districts in Iowa
