= Clinton Osborne =

American football and basketball coach (1888–1962)

Biographical details
- Born: September 5, 1888; Rockford, Illinois, U.S.
- Died: June 9, 1962 (aged 73); Libertyville, Illinois, U.S.

Playing career
- 1908–1911: Beloit
- Position: Quarterback

Coaching career (HC unless noted)

Football
- 1912–1913: Clinton HS (IA)
- 1914–1916: North-Western College
- 1917–1921: Lyons Township HS (IL)
- 1922–1924: DePaul Academy (IL)

Basketball
- 1915–1917: North-Western College

Head coaching record
- Overall: 14–9–1 (college football); 23–9 (college basketball)

Accomplishments and honors

Championships
- Football; Iowa state (1913)

Clinton Milan Osborne (September 5, 1888 – June 9, 1962) was an American football and basketball coach. He coached high school football in Iowa and Illinois and was head football coach at North-Western College—now known as North Central College—in Naperville, Illinois from 1914 to 1916. Osborne also coached basketball at North-Western College from 1914 to 1917.

== Biography ==
Osborne attended Rockford High School in Rockford, Illinois, where he was a member of the football and baseball teams. He was the varsity quarterback at Beloit College for four seasons and graduated in 1912. That fall, he became the head football coach at Clinton High School in Clinton, Iowa. In 1913, he developed the Osborne Shift, a formation similar to the Minnesota shift, although Osborne claimed to have developed it independently. That season, Clinton High, led by Eddie "Nips" Murphy and Duke Slater, won the state championship. In 1914, Osborne became the athletic coach at North-Western College (now North Central College) in Naperville, Illinois. After a losing record (2–4) in Osborne's first season, NWC improved to 5–4 in 1915 and 7–1–1 in 1916. He was also the school's men's basketball coach and amassed a 23–9 record over two seasons.

In 1917, Osborne returned to the high school ranks with Lyons Township High School in La Grange, Illinois. In 1922, he became the football, basketball, and baseball coach at the DePaul Academy in Chicago.

Once his coaching career ended, Osborne remained involved in football as an official. He later worked as a broker for Equitable Life Assurance. Osborne died on June 9, 1962, at Condell Memorial Hospital in Libertyville, Illinois.

== Head coaching record ==
=== College football ===
Year	Team	Overall	Conference	Standing	Bowl/playoffs
North-Western College (Independent) (1914–1916)
1914	North-Western College	2–4			
1915	North-Western College	5–4			
1916	North-Western College	7–1–1			
North-Western College:		14–9–1			
Total:		14–9–1			
