= Rock Island–Milan School District 41 =

School district in Illinois, United States

Rock Island–Milan School District No. 41
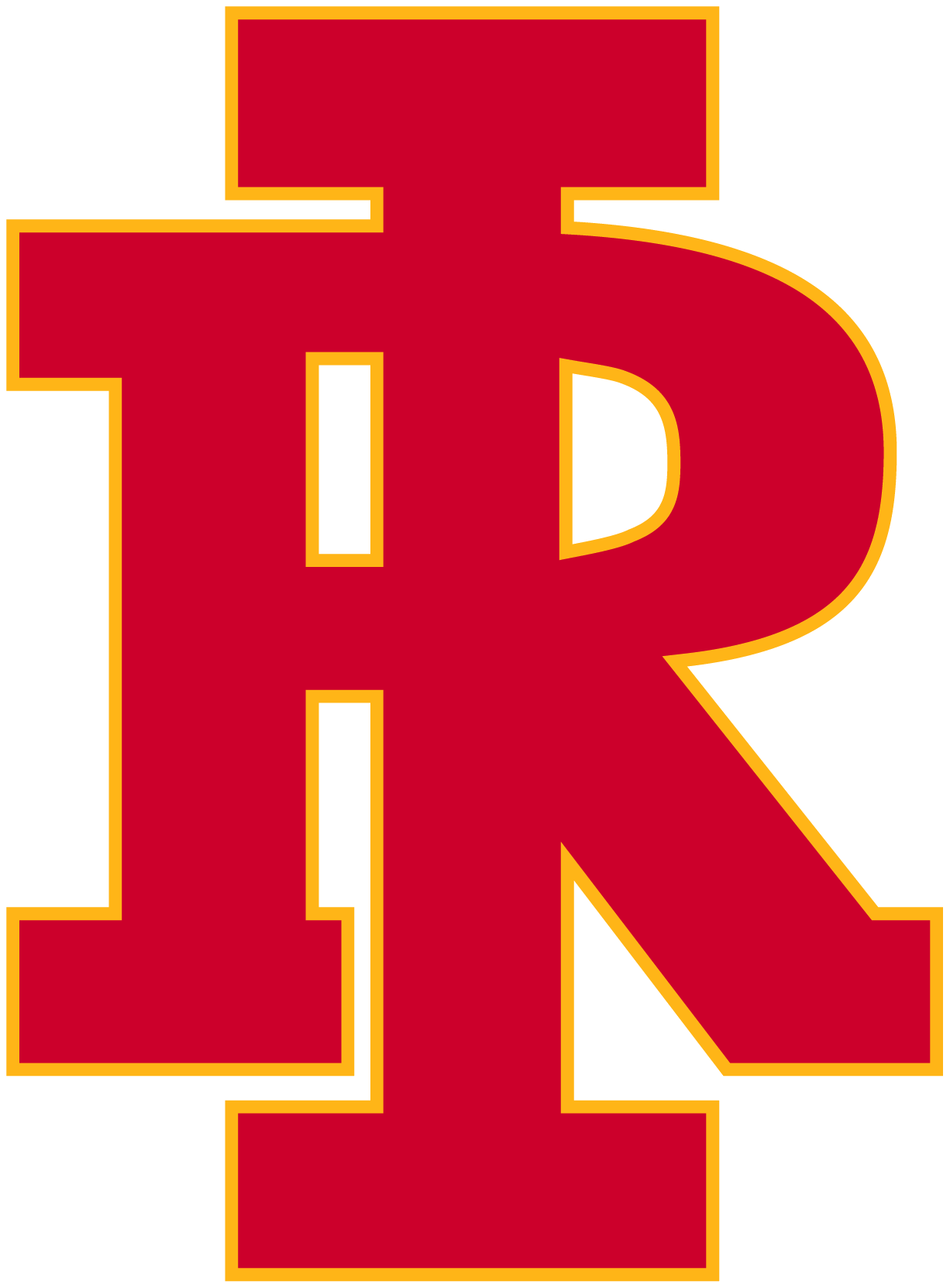

Location
- Rock Island County, Illinois United States

District information
- Type: Public School District
- Grades: Pre-K–12
- Established: February 18, 1857
- President: Mr. Gary Rowe
- Vice-president: Mr. Terrell Williams
- Superintendent: Dr. Reginald Lawrence

Students and staff
- Colors: crimson, gold

Other information
- Website: www.rimsd41.org

Rock Island–Milan School District No. 41 is a unit school district in the Rock Island and Milan areas of the Quad Cities (Illinois).

The school district includes the majority of Rock Island, the majority of Milan, the western half of Rock Island Arsenal, a small section of Oak Grove, and small pieces of Moline.

== History ==
The public schools in Rock Island existed prior to 1857, organized as five grade school districts, each with its own board and taxes, and each represented on a Union High School board. The system, including the board of township school trustees, was replaced by organizing a single Rock Island School District under a state charter issued on February 18, 1857, and including all of fractional Township 18 North, Range 2 West of the Fourth Principal Meridian plus all of the city of Rock Island, and providing that the district would annex any territory annexed into the city of Rock Island or requested by a three quarters of the voters in a territory.

== Schools ==
The Rock Island–Milan School District is currently home to thirteen schools. One high school, two junior high schools, nine elementary schools, and one alternative education center.

=== High school ===
- Rock Island Senior High

=== Junior High schools ===
- Edison Junior High
- Washington Junior High

=== Elementary schools ===
- Earl Hanson Elementary
- Eugene Field Elementary
- Ridgewood Elementary
- Denkmann Elementary
- Longfellow Elementary
- Frances Willard Elementary
- Thomas Jefferson Elementary
- Rock Island Academy
- Rock Island Center for Math and Science (newly built circa 2010)

=== Other schools ===
- S.K.I.P. and E.D.R. at the Horace Mann Early Learning Center (day care, preschool, special education)
- Thurgood Marshall Learning Center

== See also ==
- List of school districts in Illinois
