= John E. Osborn (lawyer) =

American lawyer and diplomat

John E. Osborn (born September 4, 1957) is an American lawyer and former diplomat who served in the United States Department of State during the administration of President George H. W. Bush, and later as a member of the United States Advisory Commission on Public Diplomacy.

== Family ==
Osborn is the son of Patricia (née O'Donovan) and Edward R. Osborn. He has Irish, English and German ancestry. His father was a practicing lawyer and local magistrate, his uncle was the former major league baseball broadcaster Gene Osborn, and his maternal grandfather was an airline industry pioneer and Pentagon official who was closely associated with former U.S. Secretary of Defense Louis A. Johnson. He is a direct descendant of Josiah Osborn (b. 1762) who fought in the Revolutionary War with colonial militias in Connecticut and New York. He married the former Deborah Powell of Wilmington, Delaware in 1984; they have two daughters.

== Early life and education ==
Osborn is a fourth generation native of Davenport, Iowa. He attended parochial and public schools there, and graduated from Davenport Central High School in 1975. He matriculated at the College of William & Mary and graduated Phi Beta Kappa from the University of Iowa in 1979, where he majored in economics and history and wrote for The Daily Iowan. He received a master's degree from the Johns Hopkins University School of Advanced International Studies, and earned his J.D. in 1983 from the University of Virginia School of Law, where he was an Articles Editor of the Virginia Journal of International Law.

== Career ==
=== Government and politics ===
Osborn was nominated to the Advisory Commission by President George W. Bush in 2007, and confirmed by the United States Senate on March 13, 2008.[1] The Commission is an independent bipartisan panel established by the United States Congress in 1948 to assess the effectiveness of the government's public diplomacy policies and programs; it reports its findings and recommendations to the President and the Congress.[2] Following the 9/11 attacks, there was increased interest in effectively communicating American policies, traditions and values directly to foreign publics, and the role of the Commission in evaluating and improving this work was heightened. During his tenure, the Commission gained attention for a report that was critical of the U.S. Foreign Service's human resources policies and practices in the hiring, training and career development of public affairs and public diplomacy officers.[3] From 1989 to 1992, he served with the State Department under Secretary James A. Baker III, where he wrote speeches, participated in trade negotiations and worked with an inter-agency group to reconcile executive privilege concerns in response to Congressional oversight of policies leading to the first Gulf War.[4] After law school, he clerked for Judge Albert Vickers Bryan of the United States Court of Appeals for the Fourth Circuit. He also worked on Capitol Hill for Congressman Jim Leach of Iowa and Senator John Heinz of Pennsylvania.

=== Business and corporate law ===
Osborn is a senior advisor with the international law firm Hogan Lovells. Prior to this, for two decades he was a general counsel and corporate affairs executive for companies in the life sciences and healthcare sector, initially with a joint venture pharmaceutical company established by DuPont and Merck & Co.. He supported a wide range of product licensing and other transactions, including the 2010 acquisition by McKesson Corporation of the cancer services company US Oncology. On behalf of Cephalon, he brought and settled complex intellectual property litigation against several generic drug companies that ensured continuing protection for the company's franchise product Provigil (modafinil) that was later challenged by the Federal Trade Commission as a controversial "pay for delay"scheme[5]. He also has been active in policy advocacy, and led an effort to enact passage of the Controlled Substances Export Reform Act of 2005.[6] Early in his career, he practiced law in Boston with Hale and Dorr (now Wilmer Cutler Pickering Hale and Dorr) where he was a member of a U.S. Supreme Court appellate team in a landmark case that struck down the "sale of business" securities law doctrine.[7]

=== Academic and non-profit organizations ===
Osborn is an affiliate professor of law at the University of Washington in Seattle and has lectured at the Ross School of Business of the University of Michigan, Ann Arbor since 1997. He also has held visiting appointments in public health at the University of California, Los Angeles, in politics at Princeton University, and in socio-legal studies at the University of Oxford [8] where he was a visiting senior member of Wadham College. In 2004, Osborn was appointed by Secretary of State Colin Powell to the Board of Governors of the East-West Center, an international education and research center in Honolulu focused on the Asia Pacific region. In 1998 he was awarded an Eisenhower Fellowship and traveled to Northern Ireland to examine the roots of the conflict and the status of the peace process. He is a member of the board of advisors of the Geisel School of Medicine at Dartmouth College, and a former trustee of the Brandywine Museum of Art in Chadds Ford, Pennsylvania and the Tower Hill School in Wilmington, Delaware. He is a life member of the Council on Foreign Relations and the American Law Institute.

=== Publications ===
Osborn has contributed op-ed columns and essays on policy issues to the Washington Post, the National Law Journal, the Christian Science Monitor, Health Affairs, Forbes.com and STAT, and has written notable articles for law and policy journals, including:

- "Can I Tell You the Truth? A Comparative Perspective on Regulating Off-Label Scientific and Medical Information," 10 Yale Journal of Health Policy, Law & Ethics 299 (2010), https://www.researchgate.net/publication/45492912_Can_I_tell_you_the_truth_A_comparative_perspective_on_regulating_off-label_scientific_and_medical_information. The article was cited by the majority in United States v. Caronia (2d Cir. 2012), https://www.nytimes.com/2012/12/04/business/ruling-backs-drug-industry-on-off-label-marketing.html?_r=0.
- "A U.S. Perspective on Treaty Succession and Related Issues in the Wake of the Breakup of the USSR and Yugoslavia," 33 Virginia Journal of International Law 261 (with Edwin D. Williamson)(Winter 1993). The article was cited in a Memorandum to the White House by the Justice Department's Office of Legal Counsel in considering the question of the continuing viability of the ABM treaty with the Soviet Union (June 26, 1996).
