= Jake Hirst (baseball) =

American baseball coach

New York Yankees – No. 84
- Coach
- Born: February 2, 1995 (age 31)

Teams
- New York Yankees (2026–present)

Jacob Hirst (born February 2, 1995) is an American baseball coach for the New York Yankees of Major League Baseball (MLB).

== Career ==
Hirst graduated from Assumption High School in Davenport, Iowa, in 2013. He enrolled at Central College, where he played college baseball and graduated in 2017. In his senior year, he earned a certification as a strength and conditioning specialist.

Hirst coached at Augustana College for two years, and earned a master's degree in exercise physiology in 2018 from St. Ambrose University. He met Dillon Lawson, a coach for the Yankees, which led to the Yankees hiring him as a Minor League Baseball coach in 2019.

The Yankees promoted Hirst to the major leagues as an assistant hitting coach for the 2026 season.
