= Alleman Catholic High School =

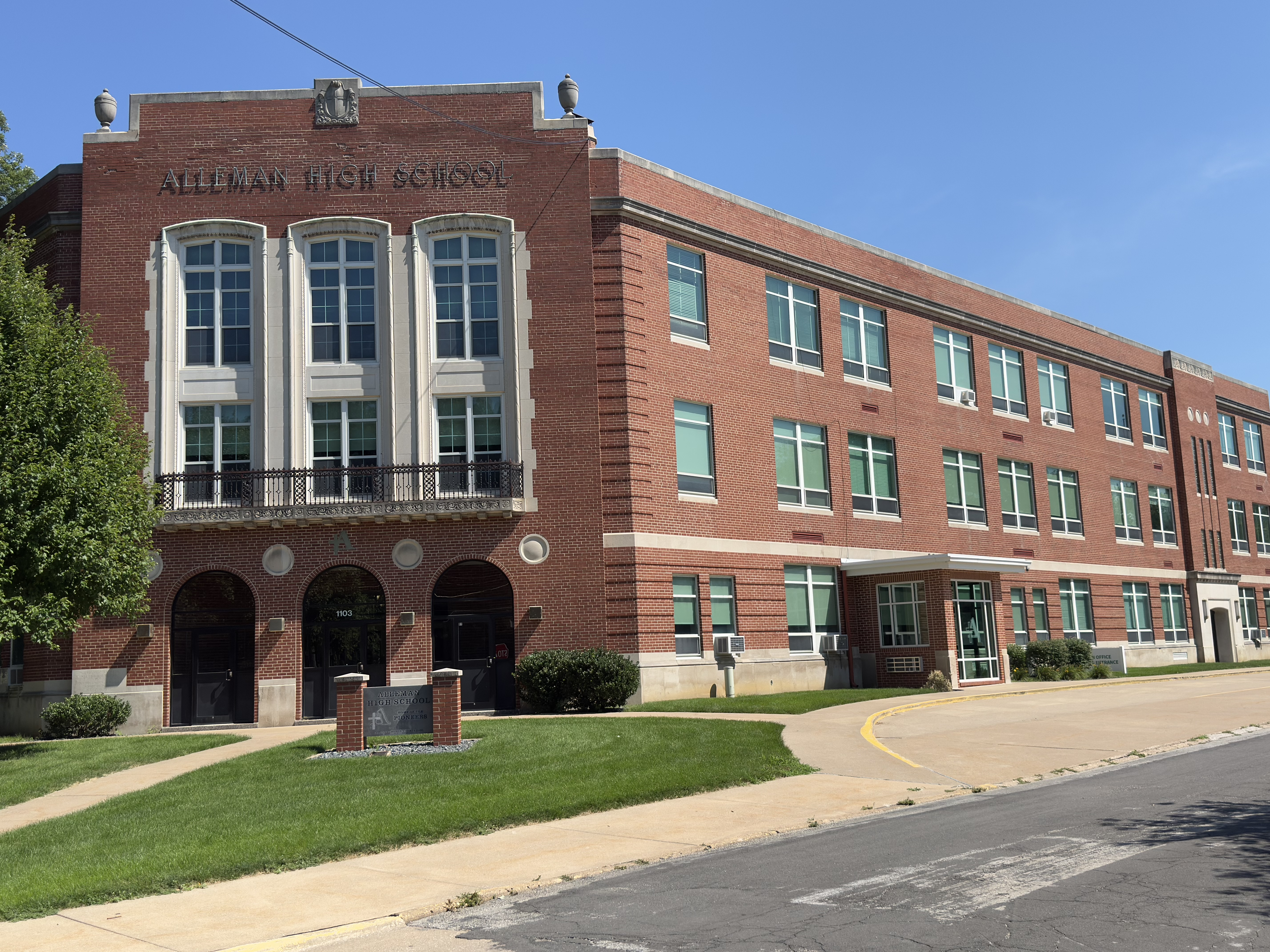
- Alleman Catholic High School in 2025

Location
- 1103 40th Street; Rock Island, Illinois 61201-3199; United States
- Coordinates: 41.4996°N 90.5449°W

Information
- Type: Private, Coeducational
- Denomination: Catholic
- Established: 1949
- CEEB code: 143-720
- Principal: Jane Barrett
- Chaplain: Fr. Jacob Martini
- Teaching staff: 28.9 (on an FTE basis)
- Grades: 9–12
- Enrollment: 310 (2025–2026)
- Student to teacher ratio: 15.1
- Colors: Kelly Green and White
- Song: "Hail to the Pioneers"
- Athletics conference: Western Big 6
- Mascot: Pioneer
- Team name: Pioneers
- Rival: Moline High School Rock Island High School United Township High School
- Accreditation: North Central Association of Colleges and Schools
- Publication: Reflections (Literary Publication)
- Newspaper: Pioneer Press
- Yearbook: Pioneer
- Tuition: $3500-$7050
- Feeder schools: Seton Catholic, Jordan Catholic,
- Website: Official website

Alleman Catholic High School is a private, Catholic high school in Rock Island, Illinois. It is located in the Diocese of Peoria. It is the second largest Catholic high school in the Quad Cities.

== School history ==
Alleman Catholic High School was established in 1949 and named for Rev John George Alleman. Its first principal was Father John F. O'Connor.

== Athletics ==
Alleman Catholic High School competes in the Illinois High School Association and is a member school of the Western Big 6 Conference. Available for the male students are baseball, basketball, cross country, football, golf, soccer, tennis, track & field, and wrestling. Female students have cheerleading, basketball, cross country, the Emeralds dance team, soccer, softball, tennis, track & field, golf, and volleyball available. The school's mascot is the Pioneer.

== Notable alumni ==
- Lane Evans, Democratic member of the United States House of Representatives from 1983 until 2007.
- Christopher Glancy, Catholic bishop in Belize
- Charles Jagusah, college football offensive tackle for the Notre Dame Fighting Irish
- Mark Johnson, Olympian and winningest Wrestling Coach at the University of Illinois.
- Adam Lingner, NFL Long Snapper (1983–95); played in four Super Bowls.
- Gene Oliver, professional Baseball Player
- Bobby Schilling, former U.S. Congressman from Illinois's 17th congressional district
- Cody Sedlock, pitcher for the Baltimore Orioles
