= Dan Roushar =

American football coach (born 1960)

Chicago Bears
- Title: Offensive line coach

Personal information
- Born: September 27, 1960 (age 66); Clinton, Iowa, U.S.

Career information
- Position: Quarterback
- High school: Clinton (IA)
- College: Northern Illinois

Career history
- Northern Illinois (1984–1985) Tight ends coach; Butler (1986–1988) Offensive backfield coach; Butler (1989–1992) Offensive coordinator & offensive line coach; Rhode Island (1993) Offensive line coach; Ball State (1994) Offensive coordinator & quarterbacks coach; Illinois (1995) Quarterbacks coach; Illinois (1996) Offensive tackles coach & tight ends coach; Northern Illinois (1997) Offensive line coach; Northern Illinois (1998–2002) Offensive coordinator & quarterbacks coach; Illinois (2003) Running backs coach; Illinois (2004) Offensive coordinator & running backs coach; Cincinnati (2005–2006) Offensive line coach; Michigan State (2007–2010) Offensive line coach; Michigan State (2011–2012) Offensive coordinator & tight ends coach; New Orleans Saints (2013–2014) Running backs coach; New Orleans Saints (2015) Tight ends coach; New Orleans Saints (2016–2020) Offensive line coach; New Orleans Saints (2021–2022) Run game coordinator & tight ends coach; Tulane (2023–2024) Offensive line coach; Chicago Bears (2025–present) Offensive line coach

Dan Roushar Jr. (born September 27, 1960) is an American football coach who is the offensive line coach for the Chicago Bears of the National Football League (NFL). He attended Northern Illinois.

== Playing career ==
Roushar was primarily a quarterback for the Northern Illinois Huskies football team, where he was particularly known for his scrambling ability. His mobility encouraged the Huskies to slot him at wide receiver on occasion.

== Coaching career ==
After graduating, Roushar became a recruiting assistant under new NIU head coach Lee Corso before being assigned to coach tight ends during the season. In 1986, he followed offensive coordinator Bill Lynch to Butler to become their new OC and offensive line coach.

He later worked in the same position for Michigan State, Ball State, Northern Illinois, and Illinois. He was also offensive line coach at Cincinnati.

On February 16, 2013, the New Orleans Saints hired Roushar as their running backs coach. He served in a variety of roles over a decade with the team, performing duties as running backs coach, tight ends coach, offense line coach, and run game coordinator. On January 19, 2023, Roushar was dismissed by the Saints. He contemplated retiring after leaving the Saints, but was recruited by Tulane University to serve as their team's offensive line coach.

Roushar was officially hired by Tulane on February 9, 2023.

After the 2024 season, he intended to retire for good but was convinced to remain in coaching by new Chicago Bears head coach Ben Johnson. The Bears formally named him their offensive line coach on February 3, 2025.

== Personal life ==
His father Dan Roushar Sr. was a social studies teacher at Clinton High School who also coached the basketball and sophomore football teams.
