= Central High School (Davenport, Iowa) =

Public secondary school in Davenport, Iowa, United States

Coordinates: 41.5297°N 90.5756°W

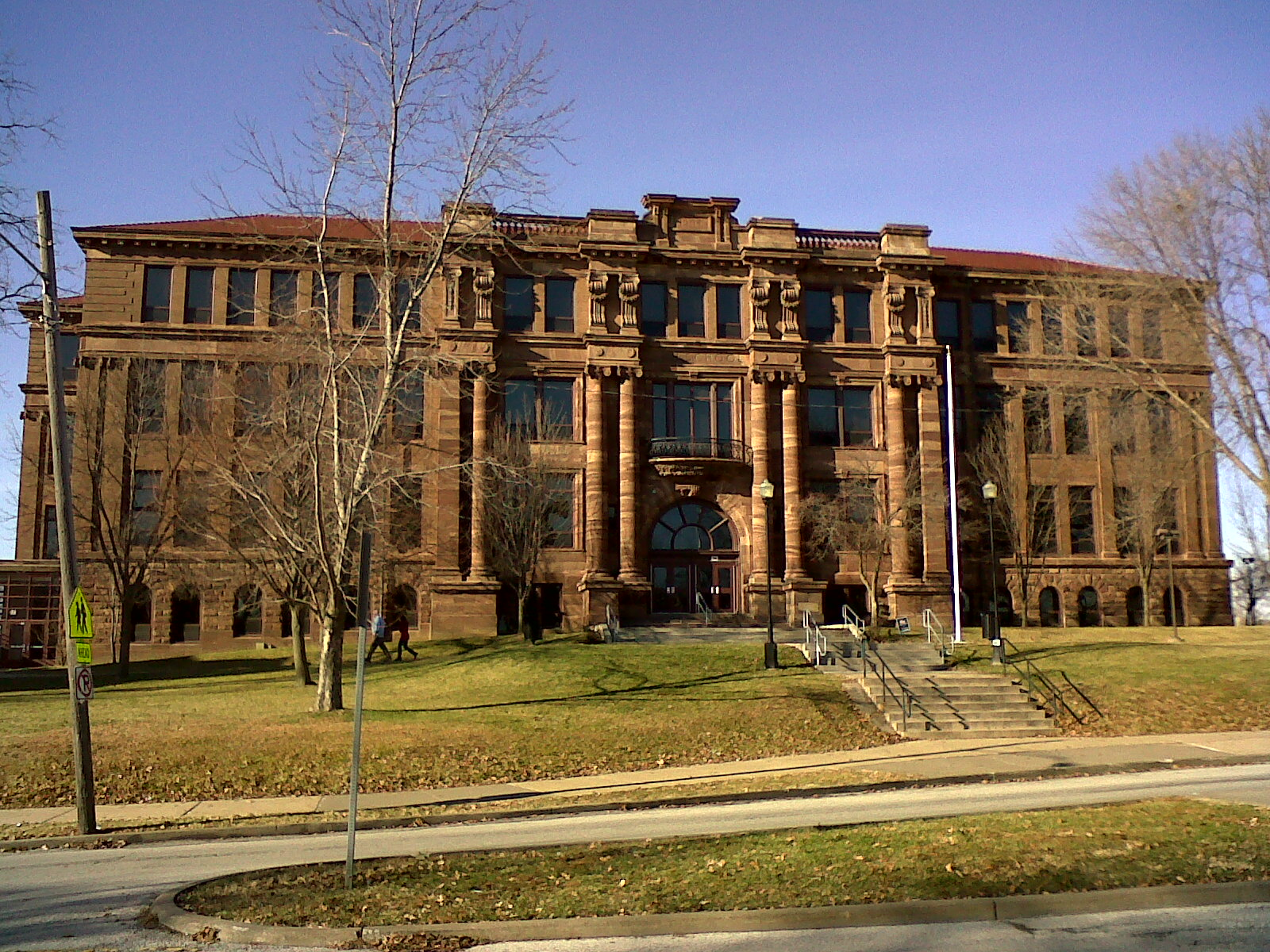

Location
- 1120 Main Street; Davenport, Iowa 52803; USA

Information
- Type: Public secondary
- Motto: Communicate with Dignity and Respect
- Established: 1904
- School district: Davenport Community Schools
- Central High School
- U.S. Historic district – Contributing property
- Part of: College Square Historic District (ID83003628)
- Added to NRHP: November 18, 1983
- Superintendent: TJ Schneckloth
- Principal: Jon Flynn Activities Kevin Petersen
- Faculty: 88.54 (FTE)
- Grades: 9−12
- Enrollment: 1,288 (2025–2026)
- Student to teacher ratio: 16.16
- Colors: Red and blue
- Athletics: Mississippi Athletic Conference
- Nickname: Blue Devils
- ACT average: 21.2
- Newspaper: The BlackhawK
- Yearbook: The Blackhawk
- Website: http://www.davenportschools.org/central

Central High School, or Davenport Central High School, is a public four-year comprehensive high school located in Davenport, Iowa, United States. The building opened in 1907 as "Davenport High School," and is now one of three public high schools in the Davenport Community School District. The school, whose western side is located along U.S. Highway 61, draws students primarily from the southern, eastern, and central portions of the city.

The school has an enrollment of 1,288 students in grades 9 through 12, and offers over 200 courses in an eight period schedule. Central has a variety of extracurricular activities, clubs, and teams. The school also houses the Davenport Community School District's high school autism program.

The school complex is part of the College Square Historic District, which is listed on the National Register of Historic Places.

== History ==
=== Early years ===
High schools had operated in various buildings and Davenport since 1861, the longest-lived of those sites being in roughly the area where Seventh, Eighth, and Iowa streets are today. An early history of Davenport and Scott County stated that the building was opened in 1875, and "grew from year to year until the building was too small to accommodate the numbers."

In 1900, a site for a future high school was secured at the old Griswold College property, roughly where 12th and Main streets are today. The school board agreed to purchase the property from the Episcopal Diocese of Iowa for $53,000, and voters agreed to move forward with the purchase. The site was described as "an ideal one for the high school of this city. The ground covers a block in the central part of Davenport; it is beautifully situated, centrally located and readily accessible."

School board members spent time studying "the best high school structures in the Mississippi Valley," and, after outlining their wishes, the architectural firm of Clausen & Burrows were hired to draw up a blueprint for the new building. The H.B. Water Construction Co. of Danville, was hired as general contractor, and construction began in 1905. The groundbreaking was described as a "great outpouring of the inhabitants of this city," with students and Bishop Morrison of the Diocese of Iowa participating. The building's facade was made of Marquette rain-drop sandstone and red tile roof, floors of terrazo mosaic and hardwood maple, and French plate-glass windows.

Construction of the four-story tall (three stories above a "tall basement"), 202×204-foot building, was completed in January 1907, with a capital cost of $347,000 and capacity for 1,600 students. The new building included a gymnasium, a 1,300-seat auditorium, manual training room, science laboratories, library, mechanical and free-hand drawing rooms, cafeteria, and administrative offices. The science laboratories were described as being "the most abundantly supplied with the most modern apparatus and other means of successful instruction."

F.L. Smart was principal when the new high school opened; George Edward Marshall was named principal in 1907, and served until his death in 1932. The gymnasium, with seating for 4,000 people, is named after Marshall.

In 1910, there were seven courses of study, each 40 weeks long and "sufficient to meet the wants of all students of high school age." Academic disciplines 100 years ago covered Latin, German, science, English, commercial business, manual training (for those entering industrial and technical careers) and domestic science. Now, different courses of study are in place.

=== Davenport High to Davenport Central ===
For more than 40 years, the new Davenport High School building served as the city's only high school. Until the late 1950s, the school also served students from all across Scott County. Many students from the city of Bettendorf, Iowa attended Davenport High School because Bettendorf did not have its own high school until 1951. The same was true for many northern Scott County students prior to 1958, the year North Scott High School opened in Eldridge, Iowa.

By the late 1950s, the city of Davenport had grown to more than 80,000 residents, and one high school campus no longer met the city's needs. West High School opened in 1960 to accommodate students from the fast-growing west and northwest parts of the city, plus the surrounding rural areas of which the Davenport School District encompassed. "Davenport High" then became Davenport Central, and served the central, southern and northeast areas of Davenport. The city's third high school – North – opened in a renovated junior high school building in 1985 and serves the northwest areas of Davenport.

Many additions and renovations have been made to the original 1905 high school building.

== Athletics ==
The school participates in the Mississippi Athletic Conference, and athletic teams are known as the Blue Devils. The school colors are red and blue. The school fields athletic teams in 21 sports, including:

- Summer: Baseball, softball
- Fall: Football, volleyball, girls' swimming, boys' cross country, girls' cross country, girls' tennis, and boys' golf
- Winter: Boys' basketball, girls' basketball, wrestling, boys' swimming, and boys' and girls' bowling
- Spring: Boys' track and field, girls' track and field, boys' soccer, girls' soccer, girls' golf, and boys' tennis

The school also has a cheerleading squad and a competitive dance team.

Davenport Central is classified as a 4A school (Iowa's largest 48 schools), according to the Iowa High School Athletic Association and Iowa Girls High School Athletic Union; in sports where there are fewer divisions, the Blue Devils are always in the largest class (e.g., Class 3A for wrestling, boys' soccer, and Class 2A for golf, tennis and girls' soccer). The school is a member of the 10-team Mississippi Athletic Conference (known to locals as the MAC), which comprises schools from the Iowa Quad Cities, along with DeWitt, Clinton and Muscatine high schools.

Davenport Central's biggest rivalries are with intercity rivals West and North high schools as well as Davenport Assumption High School, the city's private Catholic school.

=== Successes ===
Throughout the school's history, Davenport Central has enjoyed great success in many of its sports, earning many MAC conference titles and producing all-state athletes that have enjoyed success at the collegiate level and in their careers.

For many years, Central − and Davenport High before that − enjoyed success in sports, including football, basketball, wrestling, track and baseball. Football teams have won numerous state titles in football, including Class 4A playoff titles in 1973, 1976 and 1983. Many former Blue Devil players won all-state honors, and several went on to illustrious careers in professional football, including Roger Craig of the San Francisco 49ers. From 1941 through 1970, Central − and Davenport High before that − won seven state titles and two runner-up trophies in boys' basketball. Since then, Central teams have appeared in three state tournaments, winning two state runner-up trophies (in 1979 and 2008).

- Baseball (11-time State Champions - 1940, 1941, 1944, 1947, 1949, 1950, 1960, 1969, 1970, 1971, 1979)
- Boys' basketball (12-time State Champions - 1913, 1920, 1921, 1929, 1930, 1941, 1947, 1950, 1951, 1952, 1958, 1970)
- Boys' cross country (2-time State Champions - 1951, 1971)
- Football (6-time State Champions - 1955, 1957, 1962, 1973, 1976, 1983)
- Boys' tennis - 2007 Class 2A State Champions
- Boys' track and field (14-time State Champions - 1915, 1931, 1935, 1942, 1947, 1952, 1973, 1974, 1976, 1978, 1982, 1983, 1984, 2005)
- Girls' track and field (2-time Class 3A State Champions - 1982, 1984)
- Volleyball - 1981 Class 2A State Champions
- Wrestling (2-time State Champions - 1954, 1956)

== Performing arts ==
Choir

The Vocal Music Program at Davenport Central travels and competes extensively, especially Central's two show choirs, "Blue Vibrations" (JV mixed) and "Central Singers, Inc." (varsity mixed). Along with West High School, Central hosts the Great River Show Choir Competition at the historic Adler Theater each February.

Band

Central's award-winning Band Program is under the direction of Alexander Wilga and David Nicholson, and consists of a Wind Ensemble, Symphonic Band, Freshman Concert Band, Jazz Band, Pep Band, and the Marching Blue Devils. The Marching Blue Devils appear regularly in Bands of America's Grand National Championships.

Orchestra

The Davenport Central Orchestra is under the direction of Kendra Elledge. It has two orchestras consisting of the 9th grade "Freshman Orchestra" and the 10-12 grade "Concert Orchestra". Additionally, there is an extracurricular "Chamber Orchestra" that features students wishing for more difficult music and meets twice a week before school. The Chamber Orchestra competes in the "Solo and Ensemble Fest" during April, while the Concert Orchestra competes in the State Orchestras Contest. Both groups have historically placed at the top of their division for the past 10 years.

== Notable alumni ==
- Robert Arnould, state politician
- Gene Baker (class of 1943), former MLB player (Chicago Cubs, Pittsburgh Pirates)
- Patricia Barry (class of 1940), stage, film, and television actress. Central Davenport Schools Hall of Honor
- Bix Beiderbecke (attended 1919–21), one of the most influential jazz soloists of the 1920s
- Roger Craig (class of 1979), former NFL running back with the San Francisco 49ers
- Jack Fleck, professional golfer known for winning the U.S. Open in 1955 in a playoff over Ben Hogan
- Karl R. Free, artist and museum curator, best known for his New Deal-era post office murals
- Jim Hester (class of 1963), NFL football player with the New Orleans Saints and Chicago Bears (class of 1969); Davenport Public School Board vice president (1994–2000) and president (2000–2002)
- Austin Howard (class of 2005), former NFL offensive lineman for the Philadelphia Eagles, Baltimore Ravens, New York Jets, Oakland Raiders, Indianapolis Colts, and Washington Redskins
- Jim Jensen (class of 1972), NFL running back with the Dallas Cowboys and the Denver Broncos
- Catfish Keith, born Keith Daniel Kozacik, musician known as an exponent of the resonator guitar
- Perry Lafferty (class of 1935), television producer, network television executive, mystery writer
- Elmer Layden (class of 1921), football player, one of the "Four Horsemen" of the Notre Dame backfield in the 1920s, and NFL commissioner
- Jim Leach (class of 1960), United States congressman (1977–2006), chair of the National Endowment for the Humanities and professor at Princeton University and the University of Iowa
- Cecil Murphey (class of 1951), author known for his biography, caregiving, memoir, fiction, and inspirational books
- Michael Nunn, holder of the IBF middleweight title from 1988 to 1991, and the WBA super middleweight title from 1992 to 1994
- John E. Osborn (class of 1975), corporate lawyer with Hogan Lovells, Fortune 1000 general counsel, U.S. Department of State in George H. W. Bush administration, commissioner with the U.S. Advisory Commission on Public Diplomacy, law professor at University of Washington, Seattle
- William Robert Rivkin (class of 1937), corporate lawyer in Chicago, U.S. Ambassador to Luxembourg appointed by John F. Kennedy, U.S. ambassador to Dakar and Senegal appointed by Lyndon B. Johnson
- Vic Siegel, professional basketball player
- Herb Sies, professional football player played five seasons in the National Football League (NFL) and its predecessor, the American Professional Football Association
- Hilmer Swanson, radio engineer who developed several leading, patented techniques for broadcast radio Amplitude Modulation (AM)
- Julian Vandervelde (class of 2006), NFL offensive lineman. Philadelphia Eagles (2011), Tampa Bay Buccaneers (2011-2012), Philadelphia Eagles (2012-2015)
- Kay Kopl Vesole (class of 1932), member of DCHS Hall of Honor, attorney, Navy Cross recipient, killed in action 1943 at Bari, Italy, US Navy destroyer USS Vesole named in his honor
- Randy Wayne White (class of 1968), author known for his crime novels featuring the retired NSA agent Doc Ford, a marine biologist living on the Gulf Coast of southern Florida
- Jamie Williams (class of 1977), former NFL tight end with the Houston Oilers, San Francisco 49ers, and Los Angeles Raiders, academic and athletic administrator at the University of Nebraska–Lincoln
- Jim Zabel (class of 1939), radio and television broadcaster and former play-by-play announcer for Iowa Hawkeye football and basketball games
- Paul Ziffren (class of 1931), lawyer and sports administrator

== See also ==
- List of high schools in Iowa
