= Austin Howard =

American football player (born 1987)

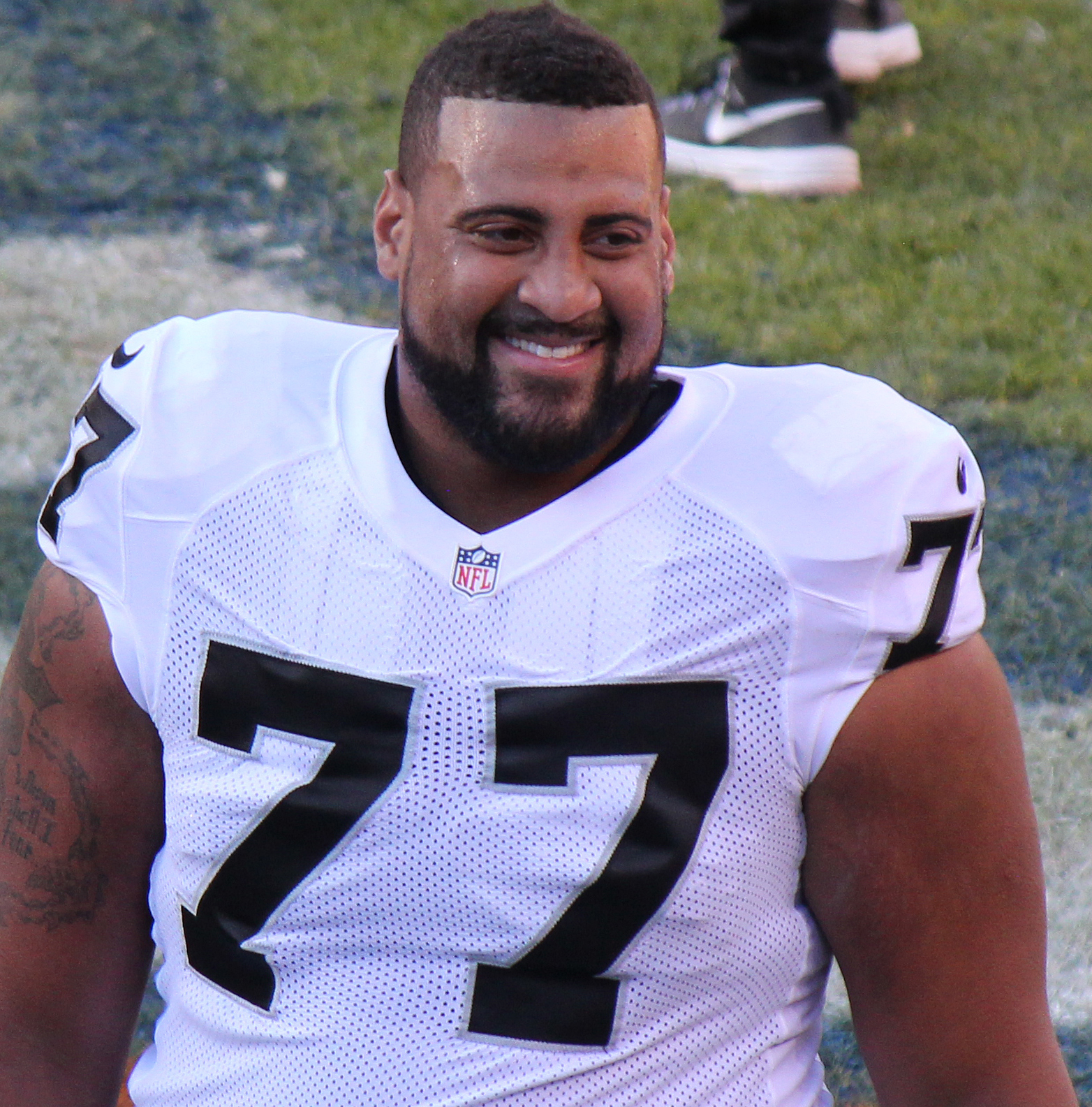
- Howard with the Oakland Raiders in 2014

No. 68, 77, 79, 78
- Position: Offensive tackle

Personal information
- Born: March 22, 1987 (age 39); Davenport, Iowa, U.S.
- Listed height: 6 ft 7 in (2.01 m)
- Listed weight: 330 lb (150 kg)

Career information
- High school: Davenport Central
- College: Northern Iowa
- NFL draft: 2010: undrafted

Career history
- Philadelphia Eagles (2010); Baltimore Ravens (2011)*; New York Jets (2011–2013); Oakland Raiders (2014–2016); Baltimore Ravens (2017); Indianapolis Colts (2018)*; Washington Redskins (2018)
- * Offseason or practice squad member only

Awards and highlights
- 2× Second-team All-MVFC (2008, 2009)

Career NFL statistics
- Games played: 97
- Games started: 89
- Stats at Pro Football Reference

Austin Howard (born March 22, 1987) is an American former professional football player who was an offensive tackle in the National Football League (NFL). He played college football for the Northern Iowa Panthers, and was signed by the Philadelphia Eagles as an undrafted free agent in 2010. He was also a member of the Baltimore Ravens, New York Jets, Oakland Raiders, Indianapolis Colts, and Washington Redskins.

== Early life ==
Howard attended Davenport Central High School in Davenport, Iowa.

== College career ==
Howard signed with Northern Iowa in 2005 as a tight end. He was redshirted during the 2005 season.

He joined the school's basketball team in December 2005 as a forward, and on December 22, he scored four points and blocked three shots in a game against Hawaii Pacific.

On December 1, 2007, in a game against the Delaware Fightin' Blue Hens, Howard caught a touchdown pass from Eric Sanders to bring the Panthers within five points of Delaware, but the Blue Hens ended up winning the game, 39–27. He started in all 13 games at tight end in 2007. He made five receptions for 38 yards.

Howard made the switch from tight end to offensive tackle during the 2008 offseason. He earned MVFC offensive lineman of the week honors following a game against Missouri State on November 8, 2008.

Howard earned second-team All-Missouri Valley Football Conference honors following the 2008 and 2009 seasons.

== Professional career ==
=== Philadelphia Eagles ===
Howard was signed by the Philadelphia Eagles as an undrafted free agent following the 2010 NFL draft on April 27, 2010. He made the 53-man roster and played in four games, starting at left tackle in one game. Howard made his NFL debut on October 24, 2010 against the Tennessee Titans.

In order to better fit into new offensive line coach Howard Mudd's system, Howard lost about 15 pounds to get down to 330 pounds. However, he was waived during final roster cuts on September 3, 2011.

=== Baltimore Ravens (first stint) ===
Howard was signed to the Baltimore Ravens' practice squad on September 6, 2011.

=== New York Jets ===
The New York Jets signed Howard to their active roster off the Ravens' practice squad on November 25, 2011.

On August 23, 2012, head coach Rex Ryan made the decision to bench Wayne Hunter, giving the starting Right Tackle job to Howard.

=== Oakland Raiders ===
Howard signed a five-year, $30 million contract with the Oakland Raiders on March 12, 2014. On September 7, 2014, Howard made his first career start at right guard, as well as his Oakland Raiders debut against the New York Jets.

==== 2014 season ====
On September 14, 2014, against the Houston Texans, Howard (started at right guard) and his offense gained 364 total yards, and the offensive line did not allow a sack for the first time that season. On September 21, 2014, against the New England Patriots, Howard and his offensive line prevented a sack for the second straight game. On October 12, 2014, against the San Diego Chargers, Howard and his offense gained a season high 396 total yards and the offensive line did not allow a sack for the third time that season. On October 26, 2014, against the Cleveland Browns, Howard and his offense gained 387 yards, which included quarterback Derek Carr's first career 300+ yards passing game. On November 9, 2014, against the Denver Broncos, Howard and his offensive line that allowed zero sacks for the fourth time in the 2014 season. On November 20, 2014, against the Kansas City Chiefs, Howard and his offense paved the way for a season high 179 rushing yards, which included running back Latavius Murray's first career 100+ yards rushing game. On December 7, 2014, against the San Francisco 49ers, Howard and his offense gained 330 total yards, which included quarterback Derek Carr posting a season-high quarterback rating of 140.2.

==== 2015 season ====
On October 11, 2015, in a game against the Denver Broncos, Howard attempted a chop block on Denver Broncos' linebacker Von Miller but missed, allowing Miller to sack Raiders quarterback Derek Carr, forcing Carr to fumble and changing the momentum of a game that ultimately ended in a Raiders loss. On December 19, 2015, Howard was placed on injured reserve with a knee injury, after starting 13 games with the Raiders at right tackle.

==== 2016 season ====
Howard played in 11 games with 10 starts with the Raiders at right tackle, having dealt with an ankle injury that caused him to miss five games.

On July 28, 2017, Howard was released by the Raiders.

=== Baltimore Ravens (second stint) ===
On August 4, 2017, Howard signed a three-year, $16 million contract with the Ravens after significant injuries to the team's offensive line during training camp. He started all 16 games at right tackle for the Ravens in 2017.

On March 13, 2018, the Ravens declined the option on Howard's contract, making him a free agent.

=== Indianapolis Colts ===
On May 9, 2018, Howard signed with the Indianapolis Colts. He was released on September 1, 2018.

=== Washington Redskins ===
Howard was signed by the Washington Redskins on November 5, 2018, following season ending injuries to starting offensive linemen Brandon Scherff, and Shawn Lauvao. He played in five games, starting one at right guard, before being placed on injured reserve with a hip injury on December 21.

== Personal life ==
Howard has two brothers, Marcel and Aaron, who both played college football for the Iowa State Cyclones, and two sisters Amy and Ashley.
