= Geneseo High School =

Location
- 700 North State Street; Geneseo, Illinois 61254; United States; 41.46305°N 90.15520°W

Information
- Type: Comprehensive Public High School
- School district: Geneseo Community Unit School District 228
- Principal: Tom Ryerson
- Teaching staff: 54.50 (on a FTE basis)
- Grades: 9-12
- Enrollment: 794 (2024–2025)
- Student to teacher ratio: 14.57
- Campus type: Small city
- Colors: Kelly Green, White, Yellow
- Athletics conference: Western Big 6
- Nickname: Maple Leafs
- Website: www.geneseoschools.org/o/hs

Geneseo High School is located in Geneseo, Illinois, United States. The school is part of the Geneseo Community Unit School District 228, which covers Geneseo, Atkinson, and parts of Colona.

== Academics ==
In 2012 Geneseo High School was a U.S. News & World Report Silver Medal winner. Based on their criteria, Geneseo High School ranked #1427 (out of 22,000) in the US and ranked #52 (out of 672) in the state of Illinois.

== History ==
Location - GHS was originally located at 119 W North St. in Geneseo, Illinois, Henry County. In the 1960s Geneseo Township High School was renamed J. D. Darnall Senior High School and was relocated to a new building and its current location on North State Street, Geneseo. Arguably, in 2005(?) it was renamed Geneseo High School. The original building became the Geneseo Junior High School, which closed in 1998 and moved to a new building, Geneseo Middle School on Ogden Avenue, Geneseo. The old building was eventually torn down and the land became part of a Geneseo City Park expansion.

== Demographics ==
The demographic breakdown of the 833 students enrolled in 2013-14 was:

- Male - 53.5%
- Female - 46.5%
- Native American/Alaskan - 0.6%
- Asian/Pacific islanders - 0.5%
- Black - 0.1%
- Hispanic - 4.8%
- White - 91.8%
- Multiracial - 2.3%

18.4% of the students were eligible for free or reduced lunch.

== Athletics and activities ==
The Geneseo Maple Leafs participate in numerous IHSA sanctioned sports and activities. The school colors are Kelly green and white. The sports teams compete in the Western Big 6 conference.

The following sports are offered:

- Baseball (boys)
- Basketball (boys & girls)
- Bowling (boys & girls)
- Cross country (boys & girls)
- Football (boys & girls)
  - State champion - 1976, 1977, 1978, 1982
- Golf (boys & girls)
- Gymnastics (boys & girls)
- Softball (girls)
- Soccer (boys & girls)
- Swimming and diving (girls)
- Tennis (boys & girls)
- Track and field (boys & girls)
- Volleyball (girls)
- Wrestling (boys & girls)

Geneseo also participates in these non-sport IHSA sanctioned activities:

- Bass fishing
- Drama
- Group interpretation
- Speech
- Band
- Vocal music
- Scholastic bowl
- Madrigals

The school won the state music sweepstakes title in 1984–85, 1985–86, 1987–88, 1997–98, 1998–99 and 2005–06.
