= USS Vesole =

Gearing-class destroyer, sunk as a target

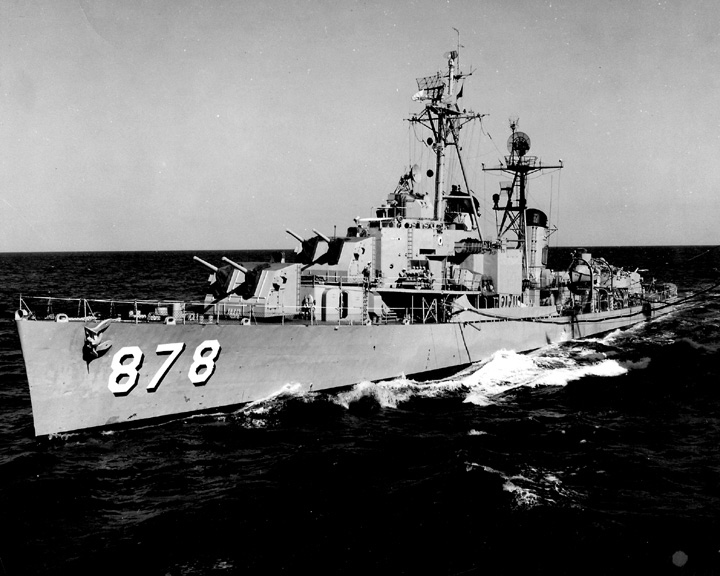
- USS Vesole refueling in 1952

History

United States
- Name: Vesole
- Laid down: 3 July 1944
- Launched: 29 December 1944
- Commissioned: 23 April 1945
- Decommissioned: 1 December 1976
- Stricken: 1 December 1976
- Identification: Callsign: NBHQ; Hull number: DD-878
- Motto: "Going on Before"
- Fate: Sunk as target, 14 April 1983

General characteristics
- Class & type: Gearing-class destroyer
- Type: Destroyer
- Displacement: 2,616 long tons (2,658 t) standard; 3,460 long tons (3,520 t) full load
- Length: 390.5 ft (119.0 m)
- Beam: 40.9 ft (12.5 m)
- Draft: 14.3 ft (4.4 m)
- Installed power: 4 × boilers; 60,000 shp (45,000 kW)
- Propulsion: General Electric steam turbines; 2 × shafts
- Speed: 36.8 kn (68.2 km/h; 42.3 mph)
- Range: 4,500 nmi (8,300 km; 5,200 mi) at 20 kn (37 km/h; 23 mph)
- Complement: 350 as designed
- Sensors & processing systems: Mk37 GFCS
- Armament: As built: 6 × 5 in (127 mm)/38 cal guns (in 3 x 2 mounts); 16 × 40 mm Bofors AA guns (3 × 4 & 2 × 2); 11 × 20 mm (0.79 in) Oerlikon cannons; 2 × depth charge racks; 6 × K-gun depth charge throwers

USS Vesole (DD-878) was a Gearing-class destroyer of the United States Navy.

== Namesake ==
Kay Kopl Vesole was born on 11 September 1913 in Przedbórz, Poland. Sometime thereafter, his family immigrated to the United States and settled in Iowa where he later attended the State University of Iowa. On 19 October 1942, he accepted an appointment as an ensign in the United States Naval Reserve. He studied at a series of naval training schools during the remainder of 1942 and the first part of 1943. Beginning at the Naval Training School, Tucson, Arizona, he transferred to the Naval Training Station (Local Defense) at Boston, Massachusetts, in January 1943. The following month, he moved from Boston to Gulfport, Mississippi, to enter the Armed Guard School. In April, he moved to the Armed Guard Center located at New Orleans. Then he was routed to Panama City, Florida, to take command of the armed guard gun crew on board a merchant ship.

By December 1943, he commanded the armed guard crew assigned to the Liberty ship SS John Bascom. On the night of 2 December, the ship was anchored at Bari, Italy, when a massive air raid of 105 Luftwaffe Junkers Ju 88 bombers attacked the port. During that raid the ship was bombed. Before it sank, Vesole directed the defense of the ship despite severe multiple wounds. When it became apparent that the ship would sink, he led a party below and supervised the evacuation of the wounded. Once in the lifeboat, he manned an oar and helped to row the boat ashore even though he had only one functional arm. When he reached land, he disregarded his wounds in order to help pull survivors out of the oil-covered and flaming waters and to get them safely into a nearby bomb shelter. Finally, an ammunition explosion inflicted still further wounds on him, which proved fatal. He was posthumously awarded the Navy Cross.

== Construction and career ==
Vesole was laid down by the Consolidated Steel Corporation at Orange, Texas on 3 July 1944, launched on 29 December 1944 by Mrs. Kay K. Vesole and commissioned on 23 April 1945. She was ordered as a radar picket destroyer. Her mid-section torpedo tubes were removed to make room for a second radar mast and aft torpedo tubes were replaced with quad mounted 40 mm Bofors AA guns

Vesole alternated operations along the United States East Coast and in the Caribbean with the 2nd Fleet with deployments to the Mediterranean with the 6th Fleet, participated in blockade operations during the Cuban Missile Crisis in 1962, underwent an extensive Fleet Rehabilitation and Modernization (FRAM) overhaul at the Philadelphia Navy Yard in Philadelphia, Pennsylvania, in 1964, and during the Vietnam War served as plane guard for aircraft carriers on Yankee Station in the Tonkin Gulf, participated in Operation Sea Dragon and Operation Market Time, patrolled on search and rescue duties, and carried out naval gunfire support missions.

Vesole deployed in northern European waters from January to June 1969 as a participant in Standing Naval Force Atlantic (STANAVFORLANT), a NATO multinational squadron under a Dutch Commodore and Canadian Chief of Staff. During this cruise, Vesole made port calls at Den Helder, the Netherlands; Portland, Plymouth, Portsmouth, and London, England; Trondheim, Norway; Lisbon, Portugal; Funchal on Portugal's Madeira Island; Bermuda; and others. Vesole participated in Queen Elizabeth II's review of NATO ships in honor of NATO's 20th Anniversary. The STANAVFORLANT squadron incorporated American, Norwegian, Dutch, and British ships, as well as West German, Portuguese, and Canadian ships for a period.

From April to September 1970, Vesole deployed from its new homeport of Charleston, South Carolina, to the Persian Gulf, Red Sea and Indian Ocean as part of the three-ship Middle East Force (USS Valcour, a converted seaplane tender as flagship, and two destroyers deployed on six-month rotations). En route from Charleston, Vesole made port/refueling visits to Bridgetown, Barbados; Monrovia, Liberia; Luanda, Angola; and Lourenco Marques, Mozambique. While attached to MIDEASTFOR, the two destroyers operated as single ship units. Vesole visited Mombasa, Kenya; Diego Suarez, Madagascar; Djibouti, then a French overseas territory; Asmara, then-Ethiopia; Bahrain; Bandar Abbas, Iran; Dhahran, Saudi Arabia; Karachi, Pakistan; Cochin, India; Colombo, then-Ceylon; Malé, Republic of the Maldives; and Victoria, Seychelles. The ship embarked Robert Strausz-Hupé, the American Ambassador to Ceylon and accredited to the Maldives for that nation's fifth anniversary of independence. The Ambassador presented that country's president with a Moon rock from an Apollo program mission. Vesole returned to Charleston in October, with port/refueling visits in Lourenco Marques, Luanda, Dakar, Senegal; and St. John's, Antigua.

Vesole was decommissioned at Charleston, South Carolina, and stricken from the Naval Vessel Register on 1 December 1976 and sunk as a target off Puerto Rico on 14 April 1983.
