= Clinton High School (Iowa) =

Public secondary school in Clinton, Iowa, United States

Location
- 817 Eighth Avenue South; Clinton, Iowa 52732; USA
- 41.836°N 90.206°W

Information
- Type: Public secondary
- School district: Clinton Community School District
- Principal: Theresa Shultz
- Teaching staff: 70.68 (FTE)
- Grades: 9–12
- Enrollment: 947 (2023-2024)
- Student to teacher ratio: 13.40
- Colors: Red, black and white
- Athletics: Mississippi Athletic Conference
- Mascot: past Rudy the river King. Present River Kings/Queens
- Newspaper: The Clintonian
- Website: www.clinton.k12.ia.us/o/chs

Clinton High School is a four-year comprehensive high school located in Clinton, Iowa. The school is part of the Clinton Community School District.

== History ==
In November 1919, a vote passed authorizing the construction of the current Clinton High School. The land for the school located on Eighth Avenue South was donated by the family of William Folwell Coan Sr.

The deed provided that the school would be named Clinton High School and the athletic field named Coan Field. Construction on the high school started in 1920. The high school opened in September 1921, although some construction was still taking place.

In 1968, a large fire caused extensive damage to the high school. The building was extensively remodeled in 1958 at a cost of $108,812. Firemen managed to save the adjoining industrial arts wing, which was also built in 1958 at a cost of $522, 049. It however was damaged by fire Dec. 31 and repair of the structure and replacement is expected to cost more than $100,000. Yourd gym, located directly west of the main high school building, also escaped the flames. It, too, was built in 1958 at a cost of $876,623.

In 2012, a large addition to the high school was completed with the main function of providing updated and additional athletic facilities. These upgrades included a new pool, auxiliary gym, and wrestling room.

In 2017, the district purchased the former athletic complex of Ashford University. The complex features a turf football field, a nine-lane track, field event facilities, locker and medical facilities, and other amenities. It was estimated that the seating capacity of the bleachers could be 500 to 700. According to tax records from 2016, the property the district is planning to purchase at 1650 S. 14th St. was assessed at $5.086 million. The land was valued at $491,050, while the structures were valued at a little more than $4.595 million. The reported cost to the district for the facility was $200,000.

On Monday, February 26, 2018, the district school board finalized a deal with the China-based Confucius International Education Group that brings at least 72 international students to the Iowa school. The students will stay in the former dorms of Mount St. Clare College and Ashford University. The CIEG will pay the district the state aid rate of about $6,700 a year per student, as well as providing accommodations for the international students.

October 2018: The Christian Science Monitor publishes profile of Confucius International Education Group (CIEG) project with Clinton High School.

In 2020, superintendent Gary Delacy brought up the idea to tear down the building there now and completely rebuild the high school. The project to rebuild will cost the residents of Clinton in total 62 million dollars.

== Athletics ==
Clinton sports teams are known as the River Kings (boys) and River Queens (girls); their uniforms display the school's colors of red and black.

The school fields athletic teams in 21 sports, including:

- Summer: Baseball and softball
  - Baseball (1964 Baseball State Champions)
- Fall: Football, volleyball, girls' swimming, girls' cross country
  - Boys' cross country (6-time State Champions – 1976, 1979, 1981, 1982, 1984, 1986)
  - Boys' golf (5-time State Champions – 1958, 1959, 1960, 1979, 1980)
- Winter: Girls' basketball, girls' bowling
  - Boys' basketball (1992 State Champions)
  - Wrestling (1987 State Champions)
  - Boys' swimming (11-time State Champions – 1941, 1946, 1947, 1949, 1951, 1954, 1955, 1956, 1957, 1958, 1962)
  - Boys' bowling (2010 and 2021 Class 2A State Champions)
- Spring: Girls' track and field, boys' soccer, girls' soccer, boys' tennis
  - Boys' track and field (5-time State Champions – 1932, 1933, 1946, 1969, 1970)
  - Girls' golf (1988 State Champions)
  - Girls' tennis (2013 State Champions)

The school also has a cheerleading squad.

Clinton is classified as a 4A school (Iowa's largest 48 schools), according to the Iowa High School Athletic Association and Iowa Girls High School Athletic Union; in sports where there are fewer divisions, the River Kings/Queens are always in the largest class (e.g., Class 3A for wrestling, boys soccer, and Class 2A for golf, tennis and girls soccer). The school is a member of the 10-team Mississippi Athletic Conference (known to locals as the MAC), which comprises schools from the Iowa Quad Cities, along with Burlington, Muscatine and North Scott high schools.

== Notable alumni ==
- Frank Berrien (1877–1951), class of 1895, U.S. Naval Academy head football coach and U.S. Navy rear admiral
- William Durward Connor (1874–1960), former superintendent of the United States Military Academy
- David Johnson, (1991–), class of 2010, NFL running back for the Arizona Cardinals (2015–present)
- Lulu Johnson (1907–1995), class of 1925, historian, second African-American woman to receive a PhD in history in the United States
- Ken Ploen (1935-2024), Hall of Fame football player (Winnipeg Blue Bombers)
- Dan Roushar, class of 1978, football coach
- Duke Slater (1898–1966), class of 1915, College Football Hall of Fame Member, first African-American All-American at Iowa

== See also ==
- List of high schools in Iowa
