= Galesburg High School =

Galesburg Junior Senior High School

Location
- 1135 W Fremont St; Galesburg, Illinois 61401; United States
- Coordinates: 40°57′46.39″N 90°23′20.19″W

Information
- Type: Public
- Established: 1861; 165 years ago
- Teaching staff: 78.37 (FTE)
- Grades: 7-12
- Enrollment: 1,158 (2024–2025)
- Student to teacher ratio: 14.76
- Color
- Team name: Silver Streaks
- Website: ghs.galesburg205.org

Galesburg Junior Senior High School (also known as Galesburg High School) is a public high school in Galesburg, Illinois. Galesburg Junior Senior High School was established in 1861 in downtown Galesburg. It has since moved to Fremont Street on the west side of town. The school is located on 80 acres (320,000 m^{2}) of land with a full lighted football field, two baseball fields, two softball fields, a soccer field, a full gymnasium, auditorium, and 2 separate buildings, one with another gym and a swimming pool, and one with 2 basketball courts, a weight room, a track, and a space for baseball, softball and other sports.

A new sports facility was finished in 2014 that has created a more centralized campus and has also made it more sports-friendly for girls involvement in sports. The new multi-purpose facility houses locker rooms, weight rooms, storage as well as more room for physical education classes.

== Sports ==
The Galesburg High School athletic teams compete in the IHSA Western Big 6 Conference, with the team name "Silver Streaks" and team colors of black, gold, and silver. The Silver Streaks moniker refers to the CB&Q streamlined Pioneer Zephyr, a high-speed train that ran through Galesburg from 1934 to 1960.

There are multiple sports offered for the students of Galesburg High School. For boys, the sports include: baseball, basketball, football, soccer, swimming, tennis and wrestling. For girls, the sports include: basketball, bowling, cheerleading, golf, dance, soccer, softball, swimming, tennis and volleyball.

The school also offers two co-ed teams: cross country and track and field.

The Galesburg High School Marching Band, also known as the “Marching Streaks,” compete in yearly competitions. In 2019, the band had a Finalist appearance at Illinois States Marching Band Championships and was the Division 4A Champion at the University of Illinois Marching Band Championship, according to IL Marching Online. The school also host 2 concert bands (Symphonic Band and Wind Symphony), Two pep bands (Silver and Gold), two jazz bands (Silver and Gold), and winter percussion as well as winter color guard. The bands director is Ms. Dena Baity.

== 2007 diploma controversy ==
In response to many families cheering too loudly and slowing the graduation ceremony diplomas will be withheld of students whose families cheer. Community Unit School District#205 relented on June 7 and gave the students their diplomas. Four of the affected students started legal proceedings against the district, claiming that they were unfairly targeted by the policy.

== Notable alumni ==
- Aaron Fike and A. J. Fike, NASCAR drivers
- Jay W. MacKelvie, U.S. Army brigadier general
- Jim Sundberg, Major League Baseball player (the baseball field is named after him)
- Sewall Wright, biologist
