= Assumption High School (Iowa) =

Private secondary school in Davenport, Iowa, United States

Location
- 1020 West Central Park Avenue; Davenport, Iowa 52804; United States; 41°32′45″N 90°35′18″W

Information
- Type: Private, Coeducational
- Religious affiliation: Roman Catholic
- Established: 1958
- Oversight: Diocese of Davenport
- Principal: Bridget Murphy
- Grades: 9–12
- Colors: Scarlet Red, Black and White
- Slogan: One in the Spirit
- Athletics conference: Mississippi Athletic Conference
- Mascot: Knight
- Nickname: Knights
- Rival: Central Blue Devils, Pleasant Valley Spartans, Walhert Eagles
- Accreditation: North Central Association of Colleges and Schools
- Newspaper: The Knight Beacon Issues Online
- Yearbook: Accolade
- Athletic Director: Wade King
- Website: www.assumptionhigh.org

Assumption High School (AHS) is a private Catholic high school in the Diocese of Davenport in the U.S. state of Iowa known for athletics, academics, and faith based education. Bridget Murphy is the current principal.

In 1958, AHS opened its doors as a co-institutional facility, with the merger of St. Ambrose Academy and Immaculate Conception Academy. AHS became coeducational in 1969.

== Academics ==
AHS offers AP classes and dual-enrollment college courses on campus. Some AP classes are available for students to take online and the school has a partnership with Eastern Iowa Community Colleges, allowing students to take a variety of online and in-person college classes. The majority of the school's upperclassmen take the ACT, and scores consistently rank above Iowa and national averages.

Most Assumption students come from Catholic feeder schools, such as St. Paul the Apostle (Panthers), John F. Kennedy (Crusaders), St. Joan of Arc (Lancers), and All Saints (Saints). With the edition of Iowa's Educational Savings Accounts (ESAs) the student body began to expand as a response to increased affordability. ESAs are a part of Iowa's school choice initiative and they provide $8,148 to every student which can be applied to private school tuition.

== Faculty and staff ==
AHS's faculty is made up of mostly lay teachers with one nun as a full time faculty member. Many hold master's degrees in education or content areas, and all meet the criteria for the Iowa teaching standards.

== Student life and activities ==
AHS provides extracurricular activities including mock trial, jazz band, National Honor Society, faith based opportunities, and a variety of clubs focusing on subjects such as robotics, drama, politics, and the environment.

== Athletics ==
Davenport Assumption participates in the Mississippi Athletic Conference, and athletic teams are known as the Knights. School colors are red and white. The school fields athletic teams in 17 sports, including:

- Summer: Baseball, softball.
- Fall: Football, volleyball, boys' cross country, girls' cross country, girls' tennis, and boys' golf.
- Winter: Boys' basketball, girls' basketball and wrestling.
- Spring: Boys' track and field, girls' track and field, boys' soccer, girls' soccer, girls' golf, and boys' tennis.

Davenport Assumption is classified as a 3A school (Iowa's second-largest tier of high schools), according to the Iowa High School Athletic Association and Iowa Girls' High School Athletic Union; in sports where there are fewer divisions, the Knights are in either the lowest or middle class, depending on the sport (e.g., Class 2A for wrestling and boys' soccer; Class 1A for tennis and girls' soccer). However, Assumption competes in the largest class (Class 4A) for boys' golf. The school is a member of the 10-team Mississippi Athletic Conference (MAC), which comprises schools from the Iowa Quad Cities (Bettendorf, Davenport Central, Davenport North, Davenport West, North Scott, Pleasant Valley), along with Central DeWitt, Clinton, and Muscatine high schools.

More than two-thirds of the student body participates in at least one sport.

=== Successes ===
Throughout the school's history, Davenport Assumption has earned MAC conference titles and all-state athletes and teams in various sports. The school is also a major producer of collegiate level athletes. Assumption has won state titles in wrestling, baseball, softball, girls' soccer, girls' track and field, and girls' basketball.

- Baseball (13-time State Champions - 1953, 1982, 1992, 1993, 1995, 1999, 2004, 2006, 2008, 2014, 2017, 2018, 2026)
- Boys' Basketball (4-time Class 3A State Champions - 1982, 1999, 2000, 2024)
- Girls' Basketball (4-time State Champions - 2008, 2011, 2012, 2013)
- Boys' Cross Country - 1974 Class AA State Champions
- Girls' Cross Country - 2015 Class 3A State Champions
- Boys' Golf - 1954 State Champions
- Boys' Soccer (2-time Class 1A State Champions - 2002 2003 2022)
- Girls' Soccer (11-time Class 1A State Champions - 2002, 2003, 2011, 2012, 2013, 2014, 2016, 2017, 2018, 2019, 2025)
- Softball (3-time Class 3A State Champions - 2017, 2018, 2019)
- Boys' Tennis - 2012 Class 1A State Champions
- Girls' Track and Field (5-time Class 3A State Champions - 2013, 2014, 2015, 2016, 2017)
- Wrestling (5-time Class 2A State Champions - 1995, 1998, 1999, 2011, 2014)
- Wrestling (9-time Class 2A State Duals Champions - 1995, 1996, 1998, 1999, 2011, 2012, 2013, 2014, 2016)
- Girl's Volleyball (2-time Class 3A State Champions - 2022, 2025)
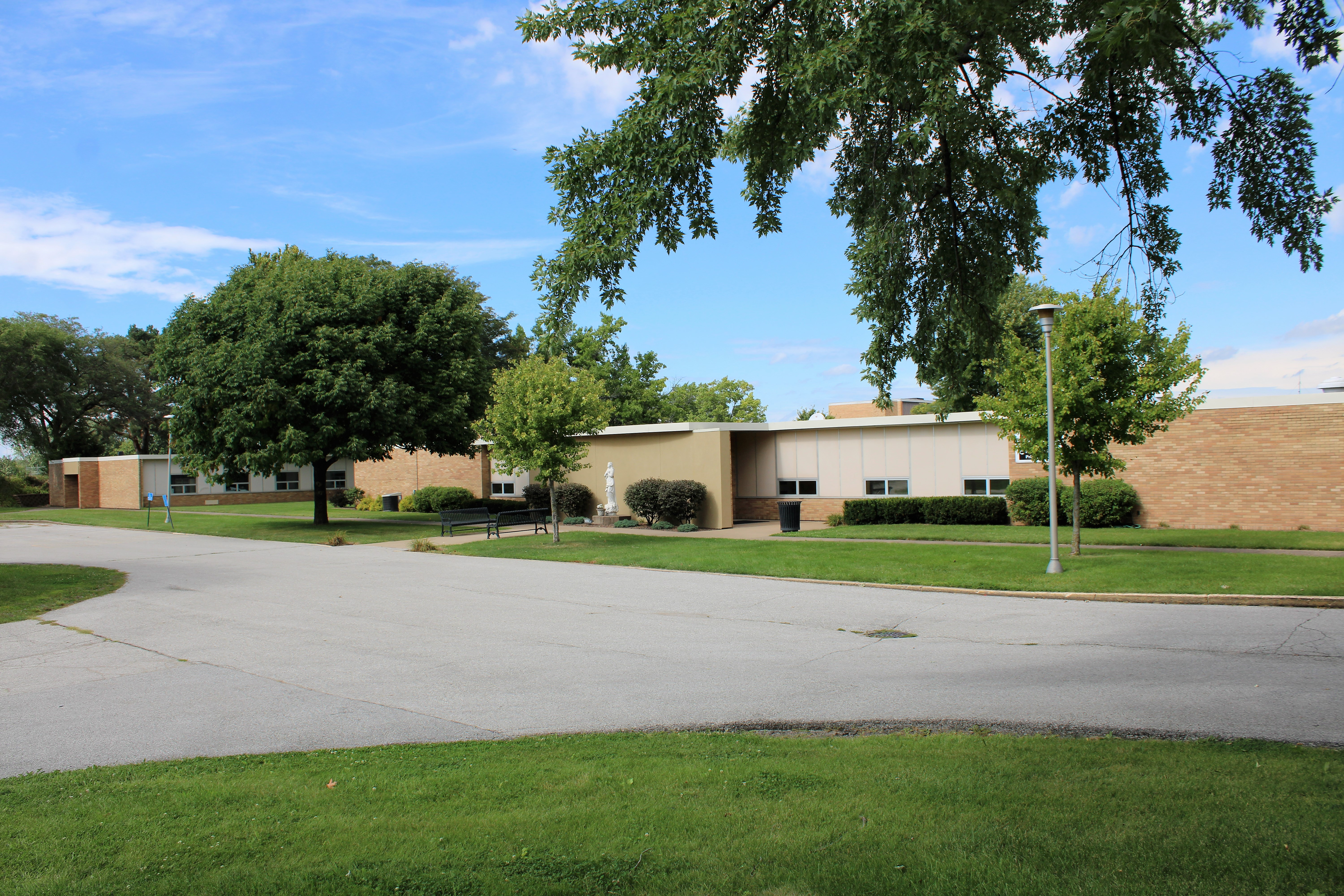
Main entrance

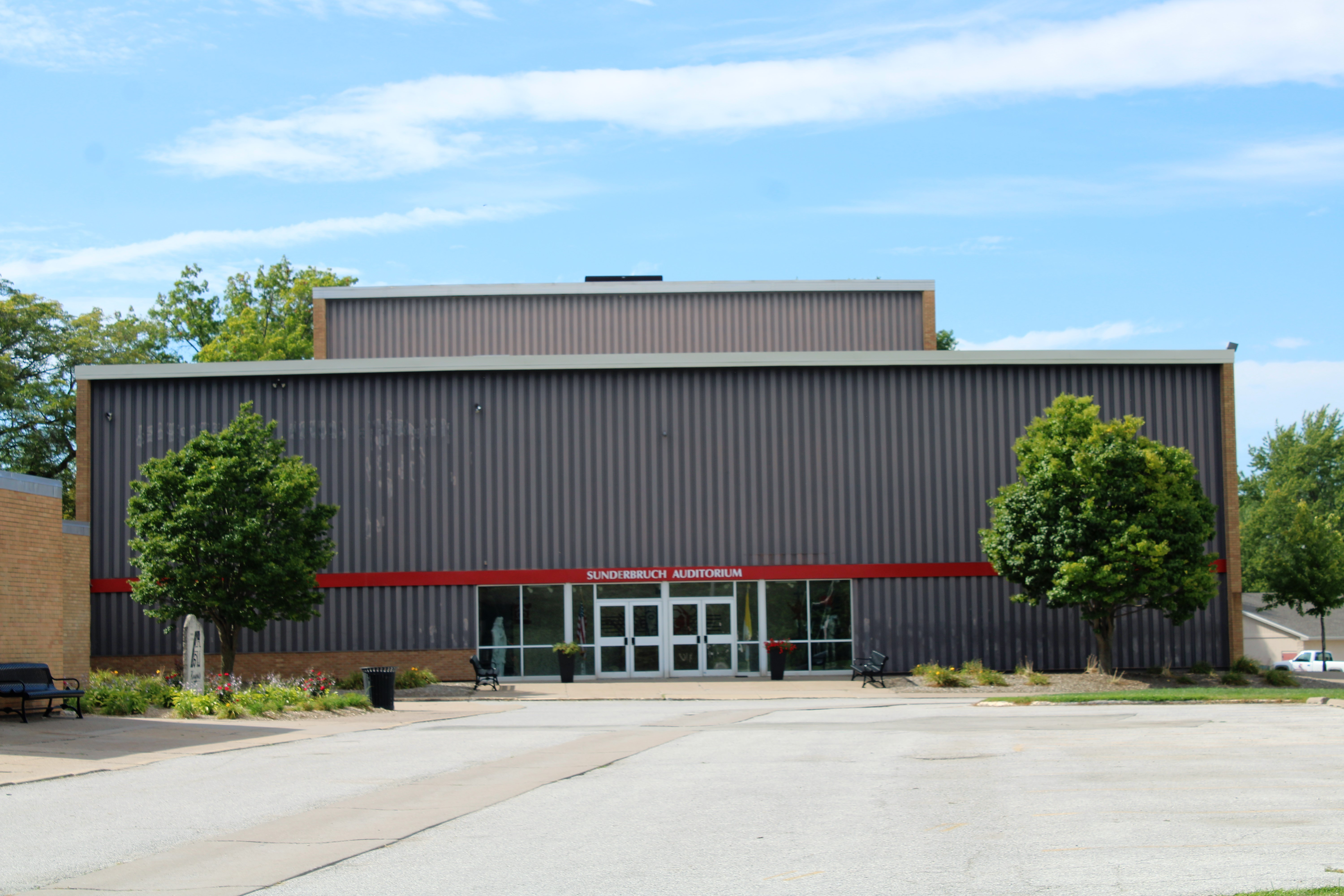
Sunderbruch Auditorium

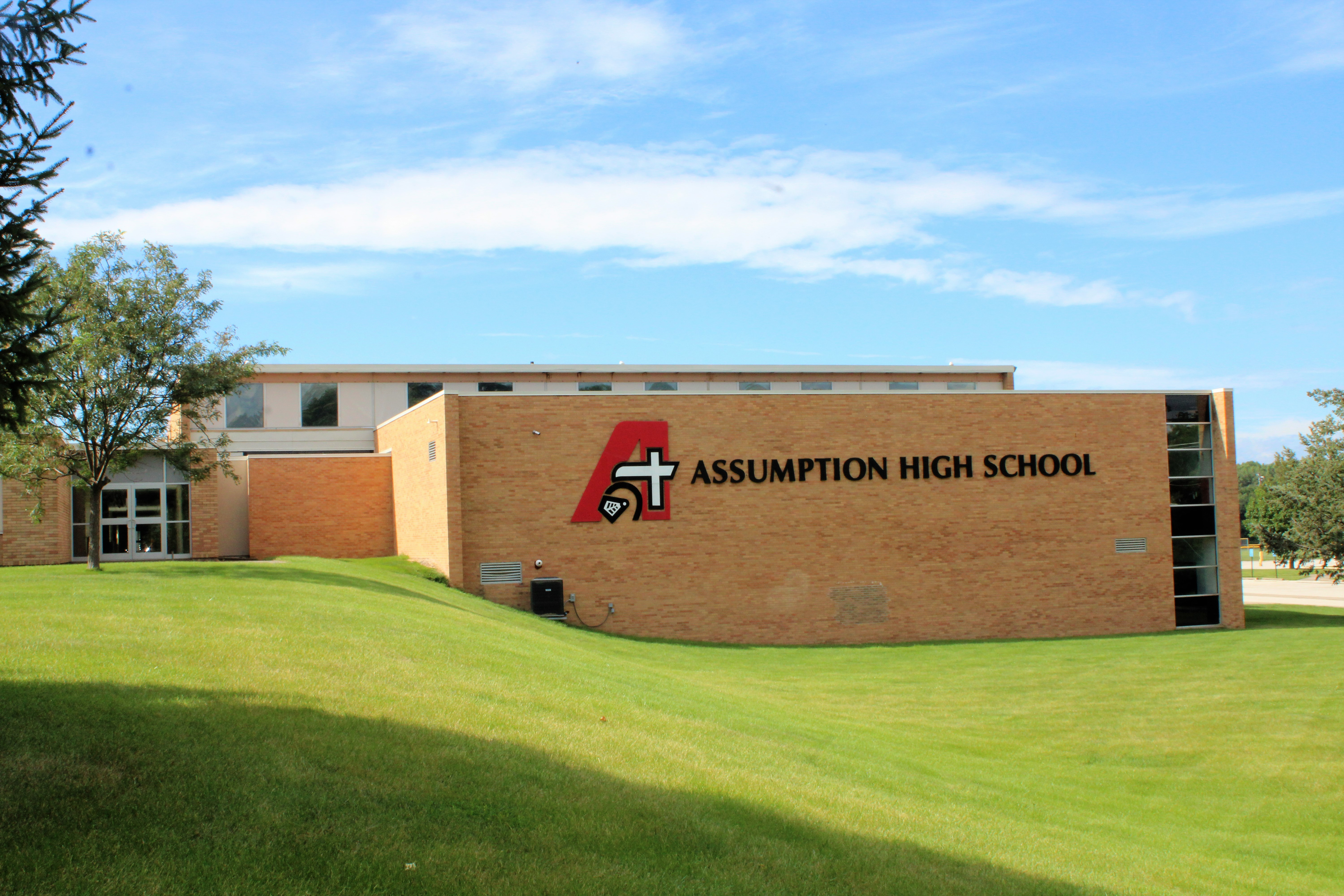
Gymnasium

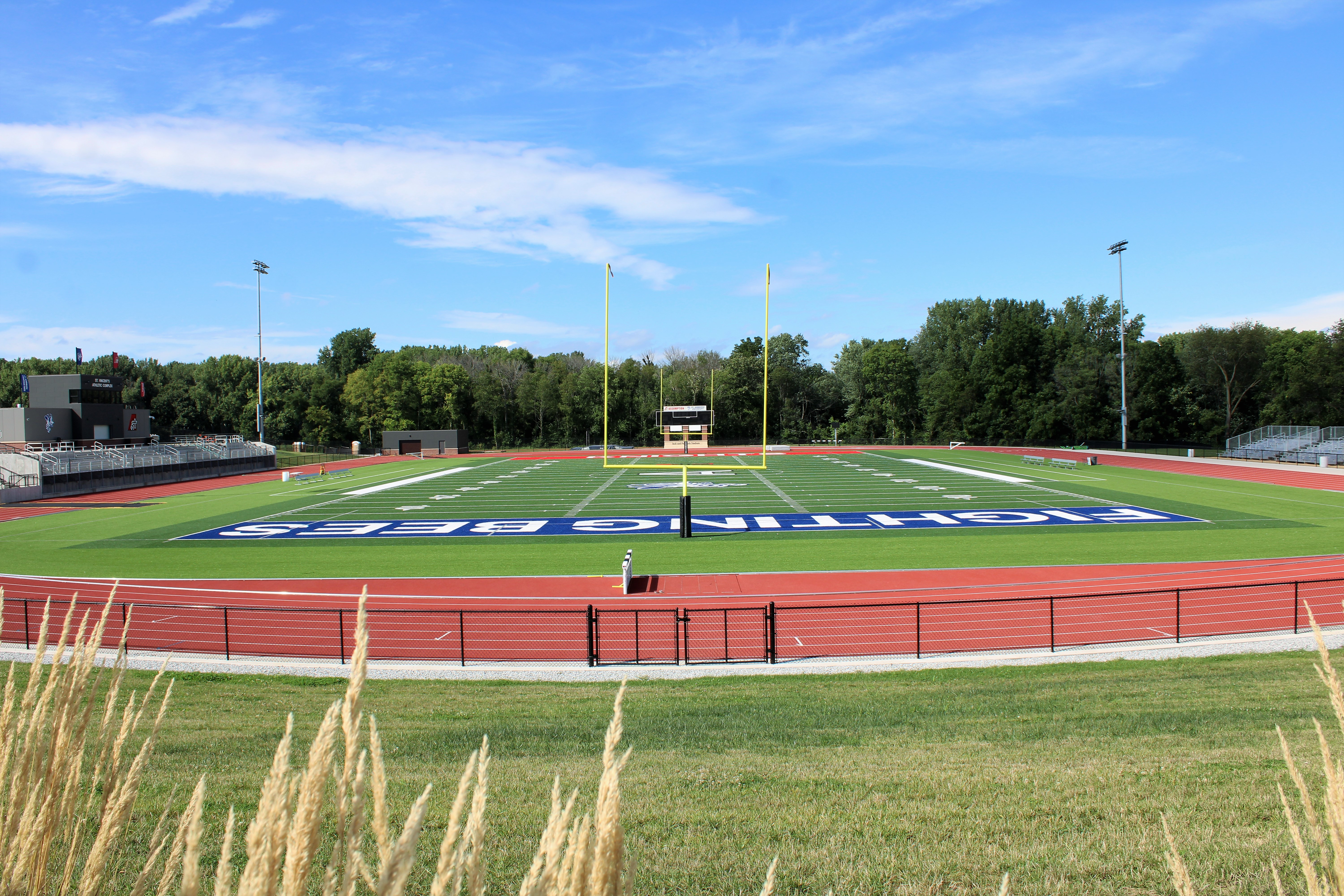
Jack and Pat Bush Stadium

== Notable alumni ==
- Jake Gervase (class of 2014), football player
- Jake Hirst (class of 2013), baseball coach
- Stas Maliszewski (class of 1962), football player
- Red McManus (class of 1943), basketball coach
- Karl Noonan (class of 1962), football player
- Liam Robbins (class of 2018; transferred after junior year), basketball player
- Jeff Schebler, football player

== See also ==
- List of high schools in Iowa
