= West High School (Davenport, Iowa) =

Public secondary school in Davenport, Iowa, United States

Davenport WEST High School

Location
- 3505 West Locust Street; Davenport, Iowa 52804; United States; 41°32′15″N 90°37′39″W

Information
- Type: Public secondary
- Established: 1960; 66 years ago
- School district: Davenport Community School District
- Superintendent: TJ Schneckloth
- Principal: Cory Williams
- Teaching staff: 93.49 (FTE)
- Grades: 9-12
- Enrollment: 1,304 (2025-2026)
- Student to teacher ratio: 15.42
- Colors: Red; White
- Athletics: Mississippi Athletic Conference
- Mascot: Freddy the Falcon
- ACT Composite average: 20.5
- Newspaper: Beak 'n' Eye
- Yearbook: The Shaheen
- Website: www.davenportschools.org/west

Davenport West High School is a public four year high school located in Davenport, Iowa. Their athletic mascot is the Freddy the Falcon. The school has almost 200 classes and nearly 1,500 students. The school, along with Davenport Central and Davenport North, make up the three traditional high schools of the Davenport Community School District (DCSD). Davenport West was built in 1960 and the current principal is Cory Williams.

In addition to portions of Davenport, the school serves Buffalo, Blue Grass, and almost all of Walcott.

== Facilities ==
A YMCA partnered with the school district was built in 2003 attached to the high school. The facility is open to the public as well as providing facilities to P.E. classes. The YMCA took over management and maintenance of the school's swimming pool when it opened.

The school shares district-owned Brady Street Stadium with Davenport Central and North for football and track and field events.

The school's cafeteria was remodeled in 2006 to bring it to a style similar to the food court style being used by Davenport North High School, which received national recognition when it was featured on ABC's 20-20.

== Academics ==
The school offers a number of College Board certified Advanced Placement courses, including AP English, AP Calculus AB, AP Chemistry, and AP Biology.

The school has an average of 20.3 on the ACT exams, below the district average of 21.0.

The school was placed on the Schools in Need of Assistance watch list under the No Child Left Behind Act in 2005. However, scores have risen from 52.6 percent proficiency that year to 67.8 percent proficiency in 2006.

== Athletics ==
The school participates in the Mississippi Athletic Conference, and athletic teams are known as the Falcons. School colors are red and white.

The school fields athletic teams in 21 sports, including:

- Summer: baseball, softball
- Fall: football, volleyball, girls' swimming, boys' cross country, girls' cross country, boys' golf
- Winter: boys' basketball, girls' basketball, boys' wrestling, girls' wrestling, boys' swimming, boys' and girls' bowling
- Spring: boys' track and field, girls' track and field, boys' soccer, girls' soccer, girls' golf, boys' tennis, girls' tennis

The school also has a cheerleading squad and a competitive dance team.

Davenport West is classified as a 4A school (Iowa's largest 48 schools), according to the Iowa High School Athletic Association and Iowa Girls High School Athletic Union; in sports where there are fewer divisions, the Falcons are always in the largest class (e.g., Class 3A for wrestling, boys soccer, and Class 2A for golf, tennis and girls soccer). The school is a member of the 10-team Mississippi Athletic Conference (known to locals as the MAC), which comprises schools from the Iowa Quad Cities, along with Burlington, Clinton and Muscatine high schools.

Davenport West's biggest rivalries are with intercity rivals Central and North high schools.

=== Successes ===
- Baseball (4-time State Champions - 1963, 1965, 1977, 1987)
- Boys' Basketball (2-time State Champions - 1971, 1994)
- Football (2-time Class 4A State Champions - 1974, 1977)
- Softball (2-time State Champions - 1984, 1986)
- Girls' Track and Field (2-time State Champions - 1976, 1977)
- Volleyball - 1970 State Champions

== Publications ==
Beak 'n' Eye: The school newspaper is the Beak 'n' Eye. It is published monthly during the school year, usually releasing 8 or 9 in a year. Students manage all aspects of the publication. They have a lab area dedicated specifically for the newspaper. The paper is completely digital and is usually 8 to 12 pages.

The Shaheen: The school yearbook is released yearly and generally features a variety of photo spreads, student pictures, and individual club and group photos. The yearbook is also produced by students under an adviser.

The Eyas: The Eyas is West's literary magazine. It generally features a wide variety of writings and artwork. It also has a section reserved for seniors to publish a profile/biography and a picture. It is also released yearly and produced by students under an adviser.

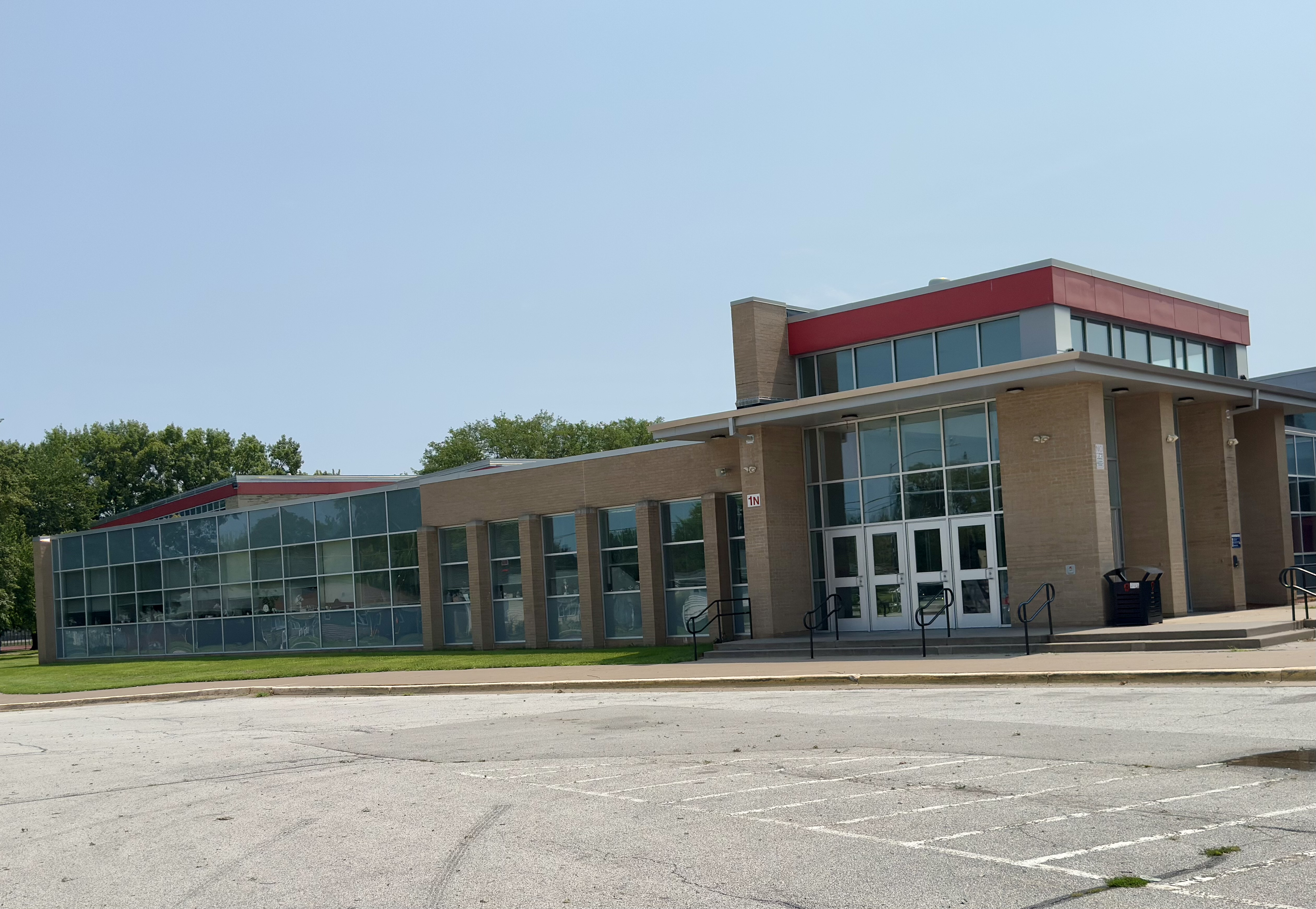
Main entrance

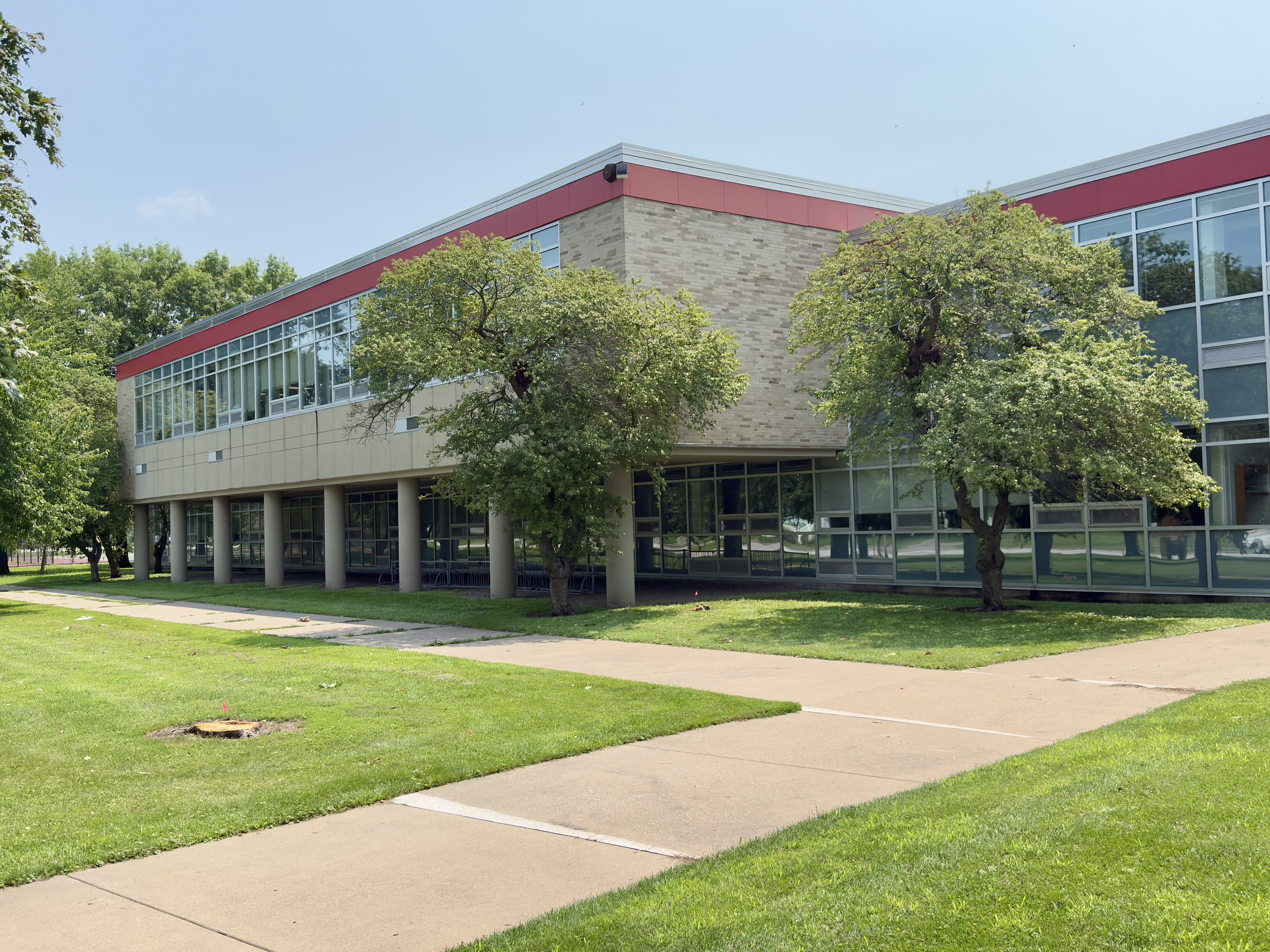
Original entrance area

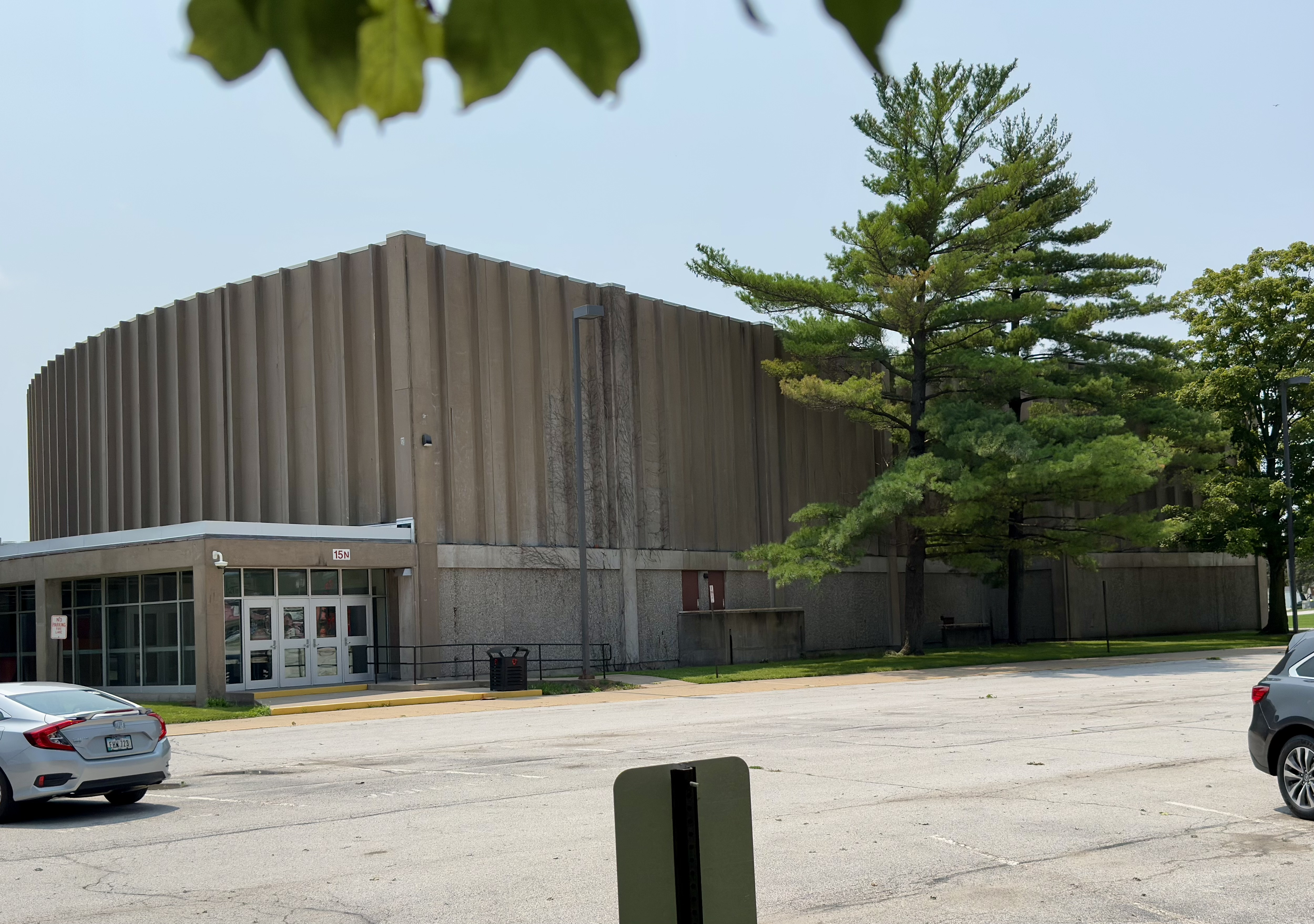
Auditorium

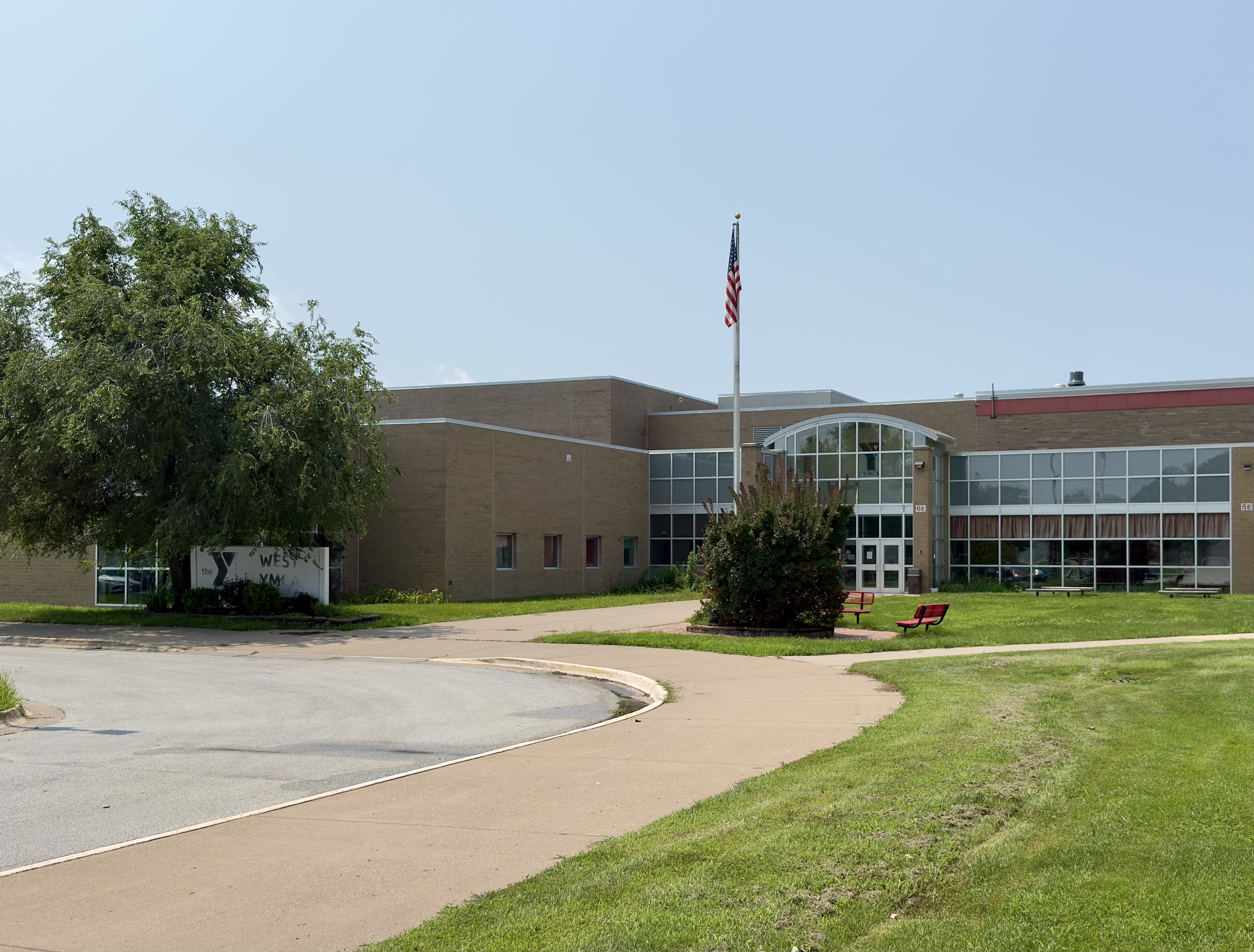
YMCA

== Notable alumni ==
- Jim Skinner, class of 1962, former CEO of McDonald's
- James Kibbie, class of 1967, world-renowned organist
- Jim Lykam, retired Iowa politician
- Bill Fennelly, class of 1975, Iowa State University women's basketball coach.
- T. J. Rubley, class of 1987, NFL quarterback, most notably with the Los Angeles Rams, Green Bay Packers and Denver Broncos.
- Kenny Shedd, class of 1989, NFL wide receiver with New York Jets, Chicago Bears, Oakland Raiders and the Washington Redskins.
- Colby Lopez, class of 2004, professional wrestler known as Seth Rollins in WWE.

== See also ==
- List of high schools in Iowa
