= Rock Island High School =

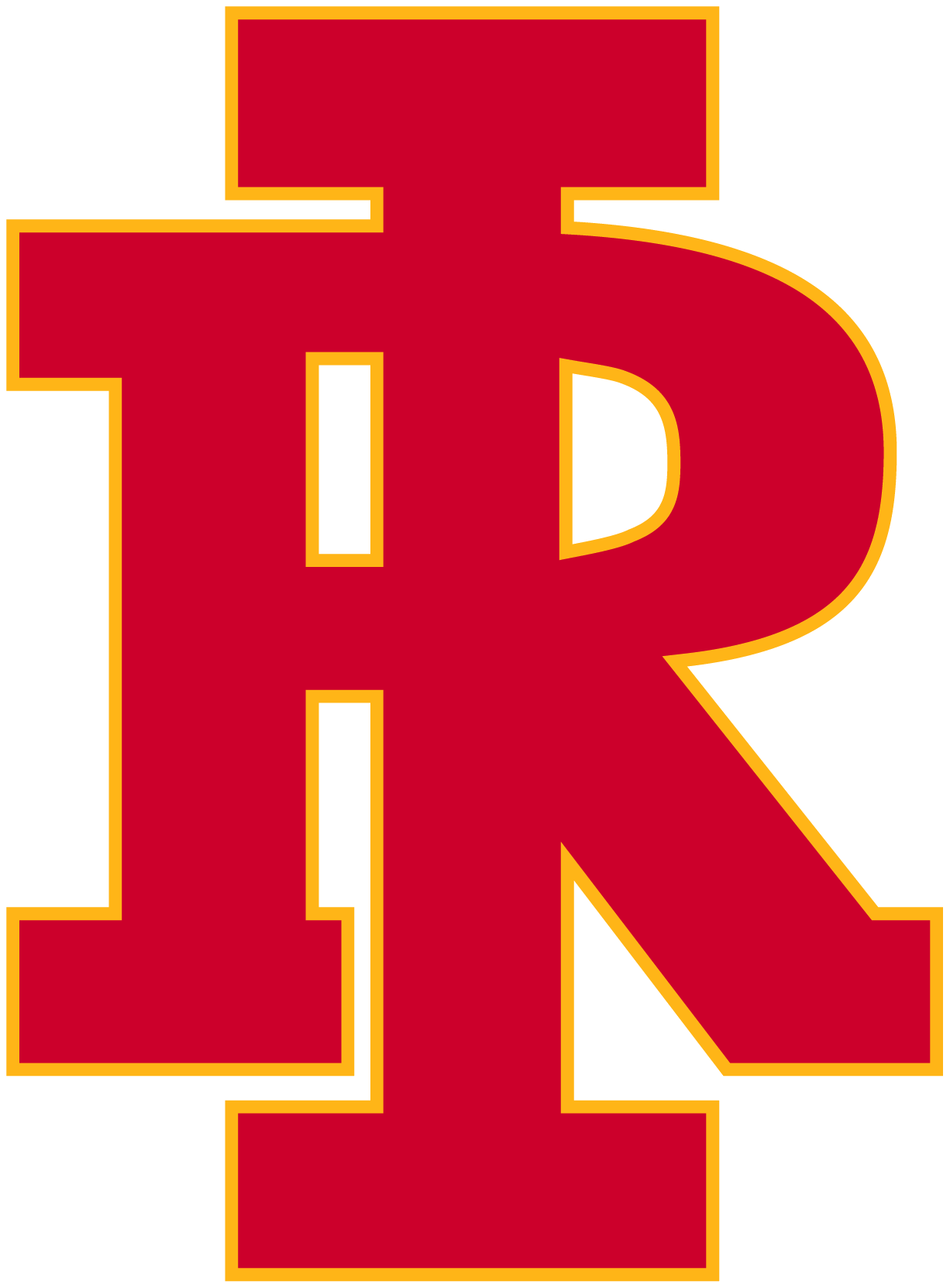

Location
- 1400 25th Ave; Rock Island, Illinois 61201; United States; 41.486937°N 90.577544°W

Information
- Type: Public
- Motto: Excellence Every Day
- Established: 1936
- School district: Rock Island–Milan School District 41
- Dean: Megan Braun- Howard; Katie Hartzler; Lawrence Behnke
- Principal: Dr. Patricia Ulrich
- Teaching staff: 101.65 (FTE)
- Grades: 9–12
- Enrollment: 1,811 (2023-2024)
- Student to teacher ratio: 17.82
- Campus type: High School
- Colors: Crimson, Gold
- Athletics conference: Western Big 6
- Mascot: Rock
- Website: rihs.rimsd41.org

Rock Island High School, also known as "Rocky", is a public four-year high school located in Rock Island, Illinois, United States. Rocky is within the Rock Island–Milan School District 41, and the school colors are crimson and gold. The school's principal is Patty Ulrich.

== Activities ==
Rock Island High School participates in the Illinois High School Association and is a member of the Western Big 6 Conference. Rock Island High School seeks to provide an array of activities to engage each student in finding their true passion.

=== Sports ===
The Lady Rocks Swim Team won its first Western Big 6 Conference title in 21 years in November 2017. The Rocks won the IHSA 3A boys' basketball championship on March 19, 2011. They defeated the Centralia Orphans by a score of 50–40 in double overtime. The Lady Rocks softball team also won their first state title in 2018. The boys' soccer team won their first regional and conference titles in 2019.

The Rocks have also won the IHSA Speech sectional for 11 years in a row, which has qualified them for the Illinois State Championship in speech, a contest that has no class divisions.

=== Music ===
The band was named an Illinois All-State Honor Band in 2013 by the Illinois Music Education Association. Under the direction of Peter Carlin, the Pride of Rock Island Marching Band has ranked among the best in the state and represented themselves as the premier marching band of the Quad Cities. The program consistently produces more ILMEA All-State musicians than any other in the immediate region.

Of the three choirs, the Chamber Singers are recognized throughout the Quad Cities for their Christmas tour. Further, the Chamber Singers are requested at many charitable events. Under the direction of Scott Voigt, the program constantly produces high numbers of ILMEA District 2 choir members and All-State singers.

Furthermore, Rock Island High School boasts two Orchestra classes due to the large number of enrollment in the program. The chamber orchestra, previously Rock Group performs at events and gigs. Mr. Matthew Manweiler serves as head of the program.

Parents of students and members of the local community support the music programs through The Rock Island Music Association or RIMA for short. The group host many fundraising events and helps with anything the musical directors need.

== Campus ==
=== Rock Island Public Schools Stadium and Almquist Field ===
Rock Island High School has an on-campus stadium, the Rock Island Public Schools Stadium, with a seating capacity of nearly 16,000, the highest of any high school football stadium in the state. Within the stadium, Almquist Field is surfaced with an AstroTurf artificial turf.

=== The Rock Island High School Auditorium ===
The community has a 1930s art deco auditorium. The lower seating capacity is 1000 persons. The upper capacity is 500 persons. The proscenium measures 50 feet.

== Notable alumni ==
- Brea Beal (2019) — 24th overall pick in the 2nd round of the 2023 WNBA draft to the Minnesota Lynx
- Jason BeDuhn (1981) — historian of religion and culture
- Ken Bowman (1960) — former NFL center with the Green Bay Packers for ten seasons, then practiced law
- Charles Carpenter — highly decorated Second World War artillery observation pilot nicknamed Bazooka Charlie
- Joel D. Collier (1949) — former head coach for the Buffalo Bills and defensive coordinator, most notably with the Denver Broncos
- Steve Decker — former MLB catcher. manager of the Connecticut Defenders (AA affiliate of the San Francisco Giants-Eastern League)
- Therese Fowler (1985) — author, Z: A Novel of Zelda Fitzgerald (2013)
- Alan M. Garber (1973) — president of Harvard University
- Tyler Hall (2015) — basketball player, New York Knicks, Texas Legends
- Courtney Lindsey (2016) — professional track and field athlete
- Marcus Ward Lyon, Jr. (1893) — zoologist, bacteriologist, and pathologist; president of the American Society of Mammalogists (1931–1933)
- Susann McDonald (1953) — classical harpist and professor of music; founder of the USA International Harp Competition
- Pete Mickeal (1996) — professional basketball player, Regal FC Barcelona
- Don Nelson (1958) — former professional basketball player and coach, inducted into the Naismith Basketball Hall of Fame
- Gary Payton (1966) — former astronaut, space shuttle Discovery mission STS-51-C
- Chasson Randle — professional basketball player and former college basketball player for Stanford University
- Mark Schwiebert (1968) — former mayor of Rock Island (1989–2009)
- Dan Stoneking (1960) – journalist, sports editor of the Minneapolis Star and president of the Professional Hockey Writers' Association
- Lefty Taber (1918) — professional baseball player for the Philadelphia Phillies
- Jonathan Tweet — class valedictorian in 1983, game designer, author, blogger
- Austin Wheatley (1995) — former football player, New Orleans Saints
- Derrick Willies (2013) — NFL football player
- Sol Butler (1915) — NFL player, Rock Island Independents
