= United Township High School =

Location
- 1275 Ave the Cities; East Moline, Illinois 61244; United States; 41.49129°N 90.43427°W

Information
- Former name: East Moline High School
- Type: Public Secondary
- Established: 1915 (as East Moline High School)
- School district: United Township High School District 30
- Principal: Matt Wright
- Teaching staff: 109.00 (FTE)
- Grades: 9–12
- Enrollment: 1,859 (2023–2024)
- Student to teacher ratio: 17.06
- Campus type: Suburban
- Color
- Song: UTHS School Song
- Athletics conference: Western Big 6
- Mascot: Pete The Panther
- Yearbook: UTHS Skyline
- Website: uths.net

United Township High School, also known as UTHS or UT, is a public four-year high school located in East Moline, Illinois, a city in Rock Island County, in the United States. The school is the only public high school in the city of East Moline, and is part of United Township High School District 30.

== Boundary ==
Within Rock Island County, the district includes most of East Moline and all of Barstow, Campbell's Island, Carbon Cliff, Hampton, and Silvis, as well as a portion of Moline. Within Henry County, the district includes the central portion of Colona.

UTHS is served by the feeder schools of East Moline School District #37, Silvis School District #34, Hampton School District #29, Carbon Cliff-Barstow School District #36, and Colona School District #190.

== Academics ==
United Township High School provides course work in the following academic departments:

- Area Career Center
- Business
- Driver Education
- Engineering
- English
- Family and Consumer Sciences
- Fine Arts
- Health
- Mathematics
- Modern Languages
- Physical Education
- Reading
- Science
- Social Studies

=== Area Career Center (ACC) programs ===
- Advanced Computer
- Applications
- Auto Mechanics
- Banking Internship
- Barbering
- Building Trades
- Child Care
- Collision Damage Repair
- Cosmetology
- Culinary Arts Internship
- Diesel Technician Internship
- Fire Science/Fire Fighting
- Health Occupations Co-op
- Interrelated Cooperative Education
- Law Enforcement and Public Safety
- Computer Integrated Machining
- Machine Trades Partnership
- Manufacturing Technology
- Marketing Education Co-op
- Office Occupations
- Pre-Engineering
- Travel and Tourism
- Web Page Design II
- Welding
- Woodworking

== Athletics ==
United Township High School participates in the Illinois High School Association (IHSA) and is a member of the Western Big 6 Conference. The school fields teams in 13 IHSA sponsored athletics:

- Cross Country (boys/girls)
- Football (boys)
- Golf (boys/girls)
- Volleyball (girls)
- Basketball (boys/girls)
- Bowling (girls)
- Wrestling (boys)
- Baseball (boys)
- Softball (girls)
- Track & Field (boys/girls)
- Swimming & Diving (boys/girls)
- Soccer (boys/girls)
- Tennis (boys/girls)

=== Conference championships ===
- Baseball (1972, 1975, 1986, 2005, 2006, 2024)
- Boys' Basketball (1974, 1994, 1999, 2008, 2017)
- Girls' Basketball (1979, 1981, 1983, 1991, 1992, 2012)
- Girls' Bowling (2012, 2014-2018)
- Boys' Cross Country (1980, 2011, 2015, 2016, 2019)
- Girls' Cross Country (1981, 1985, 1988, 1995)
- Football (1972, 1981, 1982, 1985, 1987, 1988, 1999)
- Boys' Golf (1986)
- Boys' Soccer (1996, 1999-2001, 2012, 2014)
- Girls' Soccer (2003, 2004, 2016, 2018)
- Softball (1981, 1982, 1989, 1992, 1998, 2002, 2003, 2010, 2011, 2013, 2017)
- Boys' Swimming (1990, 1992, 2001, 2010, 2011, 2015)
- Girls' Swimming (1982-1984, 1989, 1990, 2015, 2016)
- Boys' Tennis (1979)
- Girls' Tennis (1977, 1983)
- Boys' Track & Field (1970, 1971, 1975, 1980, 1988, 1992, 1993, 2008-2012, 2014-2018)
- Girls' Track & Field (1984)
- Volleyball (1978, 1980, 1993)
- Wrestling (1970, 1971, 1975, 1977, 1979, 1981-1987, 1989, 2002-2008)

=== State championships ===
At the conclusion of the 2009-2010 academic year, United Township High School has won 3 Illinois state titles in IHSA sponsored team athletics:

- Boys' Soccer (1999-2000 AA)
- Girls' Bowling (1990-1991 AA)
- Girls' Track & Field (1976–1977)

== Activities ==
United Township High School provides activities both sponsored by IHSA, and not. UT won the IHSA sponsored Illinois state title for Drama in 1947-1948. The UTHS Marching Band has been successful in the Illinois State Marching Band Championships; they were champions of the 5A Field in 1996, 2000, 2001, and 2005, and they were champions of the 4A field in 2006 and 2007. IHSA sponsored activities available to students include:

- Drama & Group Interpretation
- Music: Organization
- Music Solo & Ensemble
- Music: Instrumental

Other available activities include:

- Authentic Voices
- Cheerleading
- Crime Stoppers
- Interact Club
- Key Club
- Marching Band
- Math Team
- National Honor Society
- Panther Players
- Pep Band
- STEM Club
- Spanish National Honor
- YMCA Youth And Government

== Notable alumni ==
- Mike Butcher: pitching coach for the Arizona Diamondbacks
- Spike O'Dell: WGN Radio broadcaster
- Ray Klingbiel: Chief Justice of Illinois
- Dean Stone: Former MLB pitcher; winning pitcher of the 1954 Major League Baseball All-Star Game
