= North High School (Davenport, Iowa) =

Public secondary school in Davenport, Iowa, United States

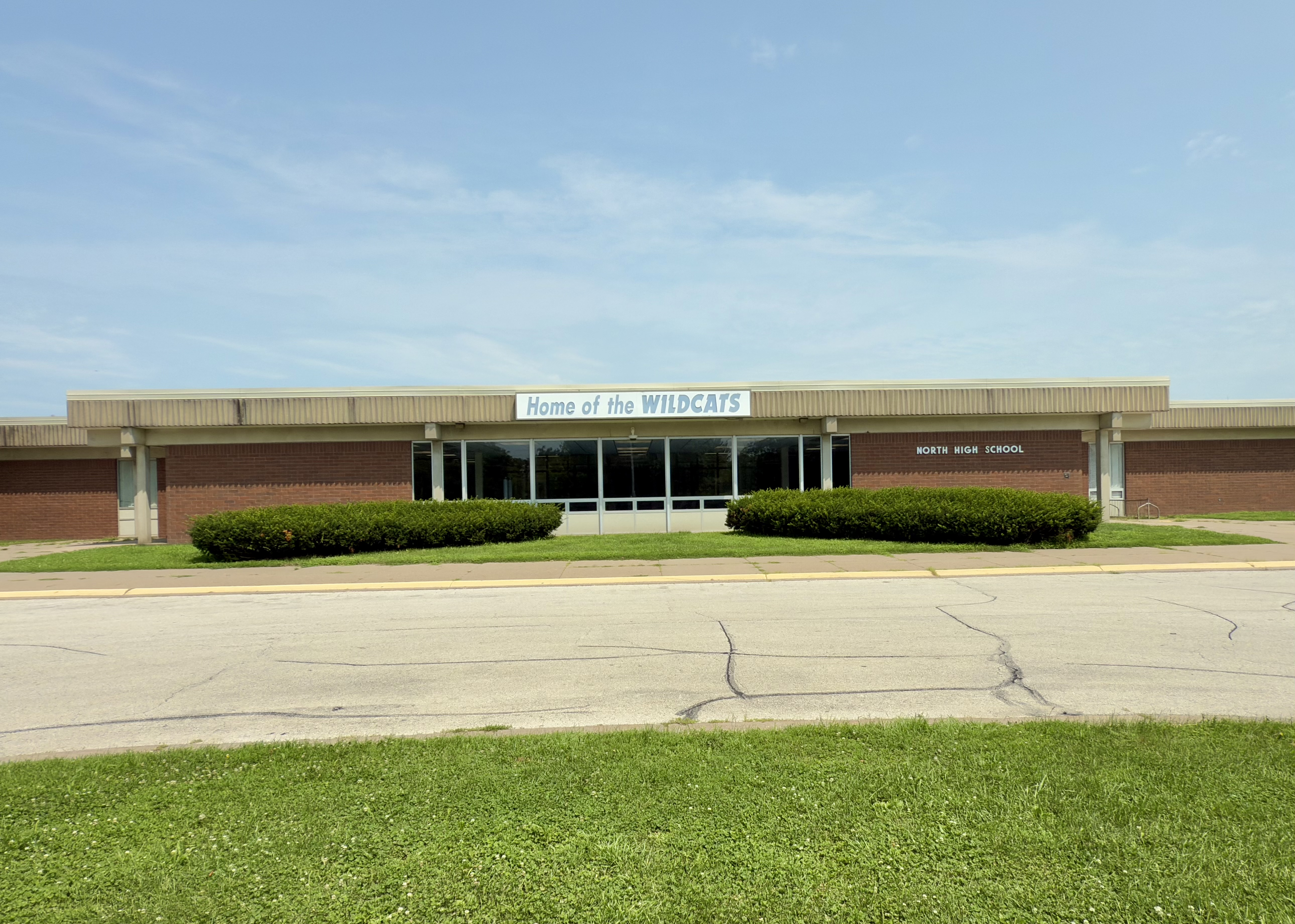
- North High School in 2025

Location
- 626 West 53rd Street; Davenport, Iowa 52806; United States; 41°34′31″N 90°34′51″W

Information
- Type: Public secondary
- Established: 1985
- School district: Davenport Community School District
- Superintendent: TJ Schneckloth
- Principal: Eric Johnson
- Teaching staff: 70.30 (FTE)
- Grades: 9-12
- Enrollment: 1,190 (2025-2026)
- Student to teacher ratio: 16.93
- Colors: Blue and Gold
- Athletics: Mississippi Athletic Conference
- Nickname: Wildcats
- Publication: The Vestige
- Newspaper: The Pursuit
- Yearbook: The Norwica
- Website: www.davenportschools.org/north

Davenport North High School is a public high school built in the northern area of Davenport, Iowa. North High School was established in 1985 in the building that was formerly Wood Junior High.

In the fall of 1994, ninth graders were added to the school as part of a district-wide reconfiguration of elementary, intermediate, and high schools. In January 1997, a new gymnasium was completed along with a "Classroom of the Future" and an Iowa Communications Network room. In 2001, a new cafeteria and auditorium were completed. A new locker and weight room were added in 2008 to accommodate visiting sports teams.

== Athletics ==
Davenport North participates in the Mississippi Athletic Conference, and athletic teams are known as the Wildcats. School colors are blue and gold.

Davenport North is classified as a 4A school, which contains Iowa's 48 largest schools, according to the Iowa High School Athletic Association and Iowa Girls High School Athletic Union; in sports where there are fewer divisions, the Wildcats are always in the largest class (e.g., Class 3A for wrestling, boys soccer, and Class 2A for golf, tennis and girls soccer). The school is a member of the 10-team Mississippi Athletic Conference, which comprises schools from the Iowa Quad Cities along with Burlington, Clinton, and Muscatine high schools.

=== Successes ===
- Volleyball - 1988 Class 2A State Champions, 1997 Class 3A State Champions
- Bowling - Boys' 2019 Class 3A State Champions

== Notable alumni ==
- Dana Davis (born 1978) — actress, voice actress, and novelist
- Ricky Davis (born 1979) — professional basketball player
- Robin Thede — American comedian and writer

== See also ==
- List of high schools in Iowa
