= Commanding Officer's Quarters, Watertown Arsenal =

Historic house in Massachusetts, United States

- U.S. National Register of Historic Places
- U.S. Historic district – Contributing property
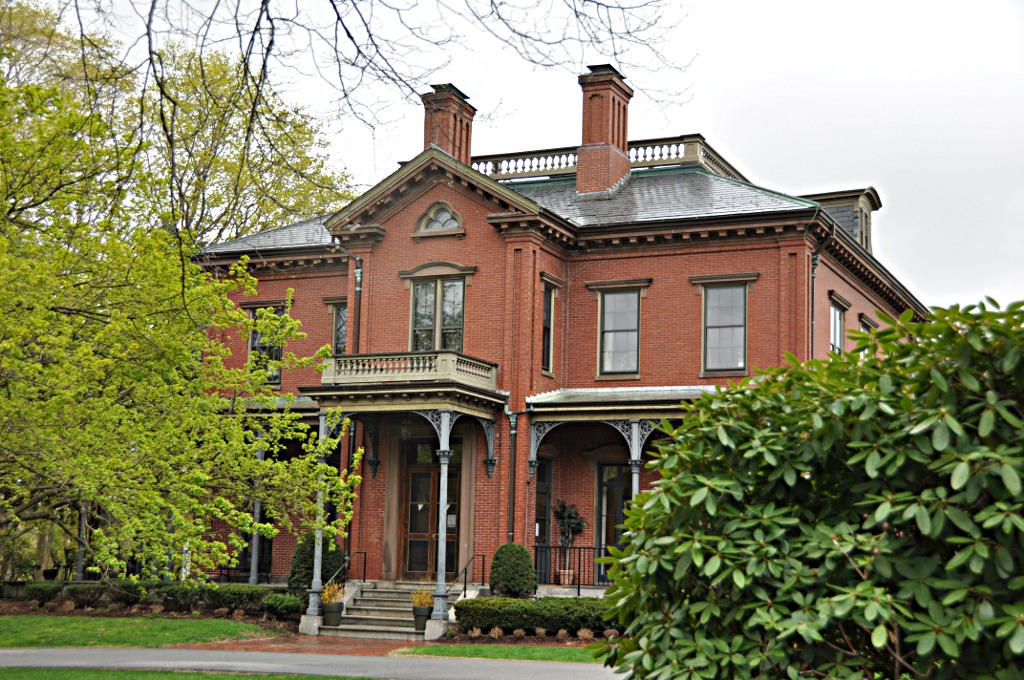

- Location within Massachusetts Location within the United States
- Interactive map showing the location of Commanding Officers Arsenal
- Location: 443 Arsenal Street, Watertown, Massachusetts
- Coordinates: 42°21′38″N 71°09′47″W
- Built: 1865
- Architect: George W. Horn, Thomas J. French
- Architectural style: Italianate
- Part of: Watertown Arsenal Historic District (ID99000498)
- NRHP reference No.: 76000279

Significant dates
- Added to NRHP: October 7, 1976
- Designated CP: May 14, 1999

The Commanding Officer's Quarters, Watertown Arsenal is a historic house in Watertown, Massachusetts. During the American Civil War, a new commander's quarters was commissioned by then-Capt. Thomas J. Rodman, inventor of the Rodman gun, for the Watertown Arsenal. The lavish, 12,700 sq ft (1,180 m^{2}), quarters would ultimately become one of the largest commander's quarters on any U.S. military installation. The expense ($63,478.65) was considered wasteful and excessive and drew a stern rebuke from Congress, who then promoted Rodman to Brigadier General and sent him to command Rock Island Arsenal on the frontier in Illinois, where he built an even larger commander's quarters. The Watertown commander's quarters house now houses offices and a museum about the arsenal.

The building was listed on the National Register of Historic Places in 1976, and included in the Watertown Arsenal Historic District in 1999.

== See also ==
- National Register of Historic Places listings in Middlesex County, Massachusetts
