= Lock and Dam No. 15 =

Dam in Illinois and Iowa, U.S.

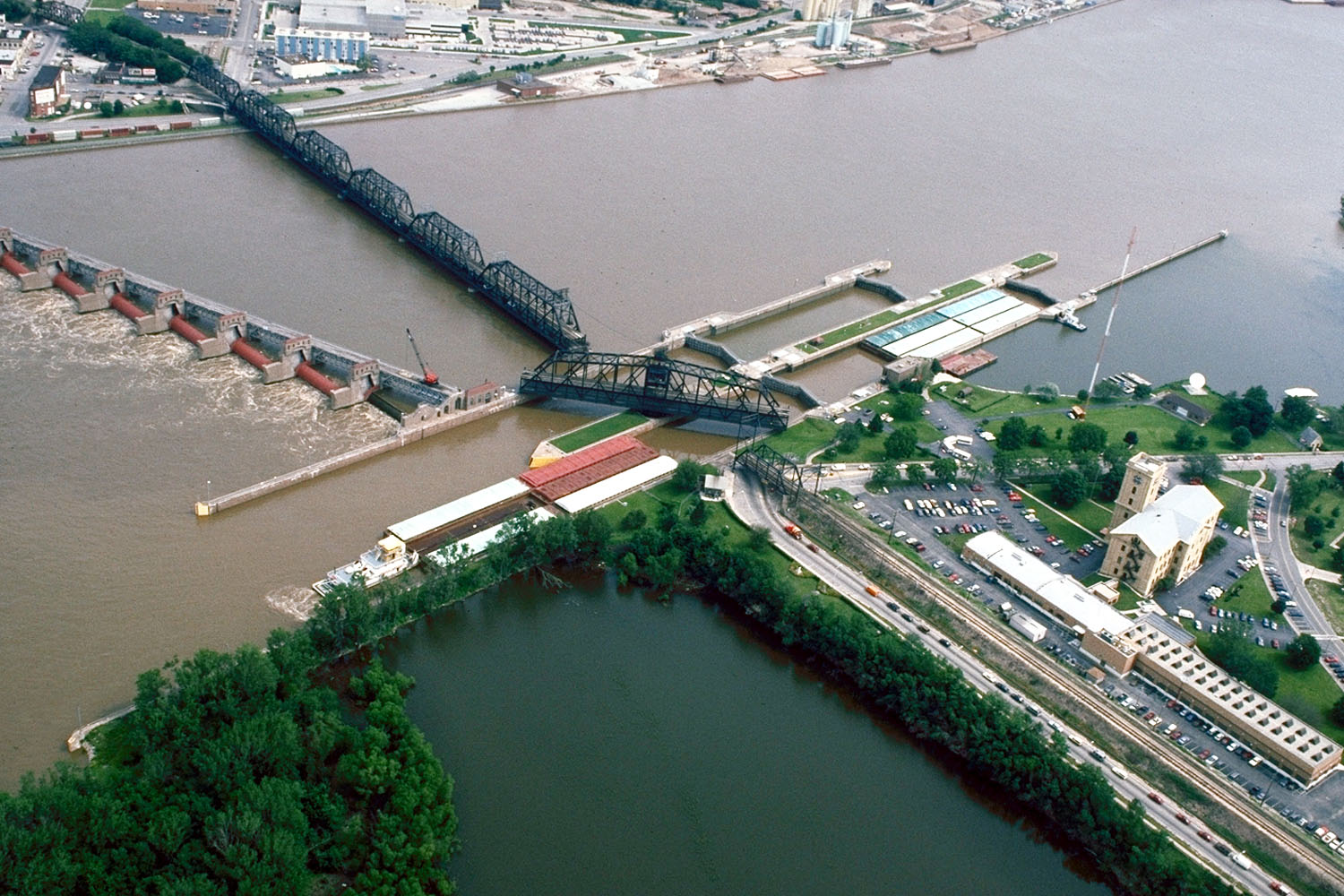
- Lock and Dam No. 15 on the Mississippi River. View is from the Illinois side of the river looking across to Davenport, Iowa.
- Interactive map of Lock and Dam No. 15
- Location: Rock Island, Illinois / Davenport, Iowa
- Coordinates: 41°31′07″N 90°34′08″W
- Construction began: 1931
- Opening date: March 7, 1934
- Operators: U.S. Army Corps of Engineers, Rock Island District

Dam and spillways
- Impounds: Upper Mississippi River
- Length: 1,203 feet (366.7 m)

Reservoir
- Creates: Pool 15
- Total capacity: 100,000 acre⋅ft (0.12 km^{3})
- Catchment area: 88,500 mi^{2} (229,000 km^{2})
- Lock and Dam No. 15 Historic District
- U.S. National Register of Historic Places
- U.S. Historic district
- Location within Illinois Location within the United States
- Location: NW of Rodman Ave., Twd., NW tip Arsenal Island, Rock Island, Illinois
- Area: 359 acres (145 ha)
- Built: 1895
- Architect: U.S. Army Corps of Engineers
- Architectural style: Lock and Dam
- MPS: Upper Mississippi River 9-Foot Navigation Project MPS
- NRHP reference No.: 04000175
- Added to NRHP: March 10, 2004

Lock and Dam No. 15 is a lock and dam located on the Upper Mississippi River. It spans the river between Rock Island, Illinois and Davenport, Iowa. Lock and Dam 15 is the largest roller dam in the world, its dam is 1,203 feet (366.7 m) long and consists of nine 109 feet (33.2 m) non-submersible, non-overflow roller gates and two 109 feet (33.2 m) non-submersible overflow roller gates. It is unusual among the upper Mississippi River dams in that it has only roller gates, has different sizes and types of roller gates, it is not perpendicular to the flow of the river and is one of the few facilities that has a completed auxiliary lock. The main lock is 110 feet (33.5 m) wide by 600 feet (180 m) long and its auxiliary lock is 110 feet (34 m) wide by 360 feet (110 m) long. In 2004, the facility was listed in the National Register of Historic Places as Lock and Dam No. 15 Historic District, #04000175 covering 3,590 acres (1,450 ha), 2 buildings, 9 structures, and 1 object.

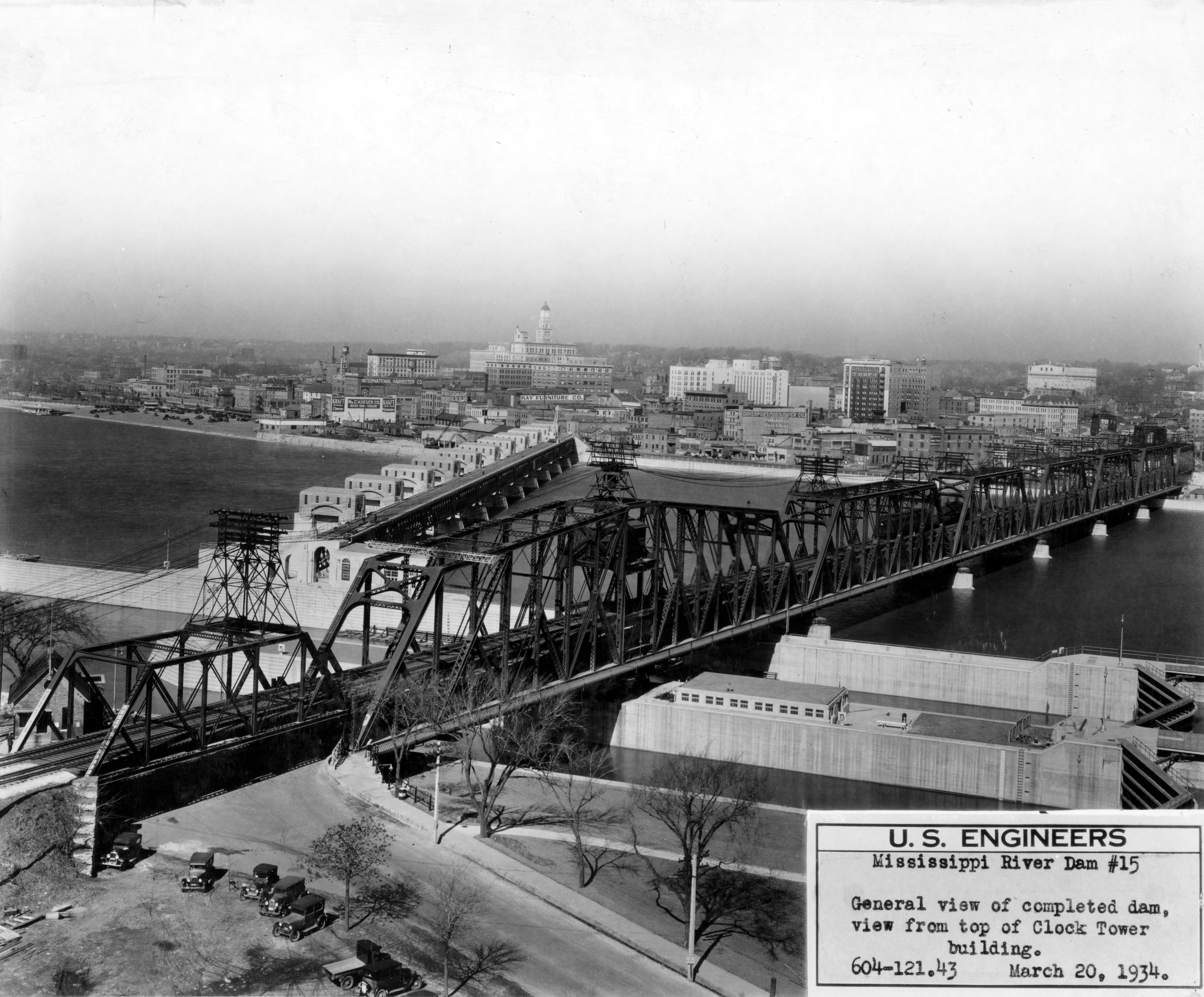
Lock and Dam No. 15 in 1934

== See also ==
- Government Bridge, passes near the locks.
- Rock Island Arsenal adjacent to the locks.
