= Quarters 1 =

Quarters 1 may refer to:

- Quarters 1 (Fort Monroe), Hampton, Virginia
- Quarters 1 (Fort Myer), Arlington, Virginia
- Quarters 1 (Rock Island), Illinois
- Quarters 1 Nimitz House, on Yerba Buena Island, California
