= Watertown Arsenal =

Historic former US military base

- Watertown Arsenal Historic District
- U.S. National Register of Historic Places
- U.S. Historic district
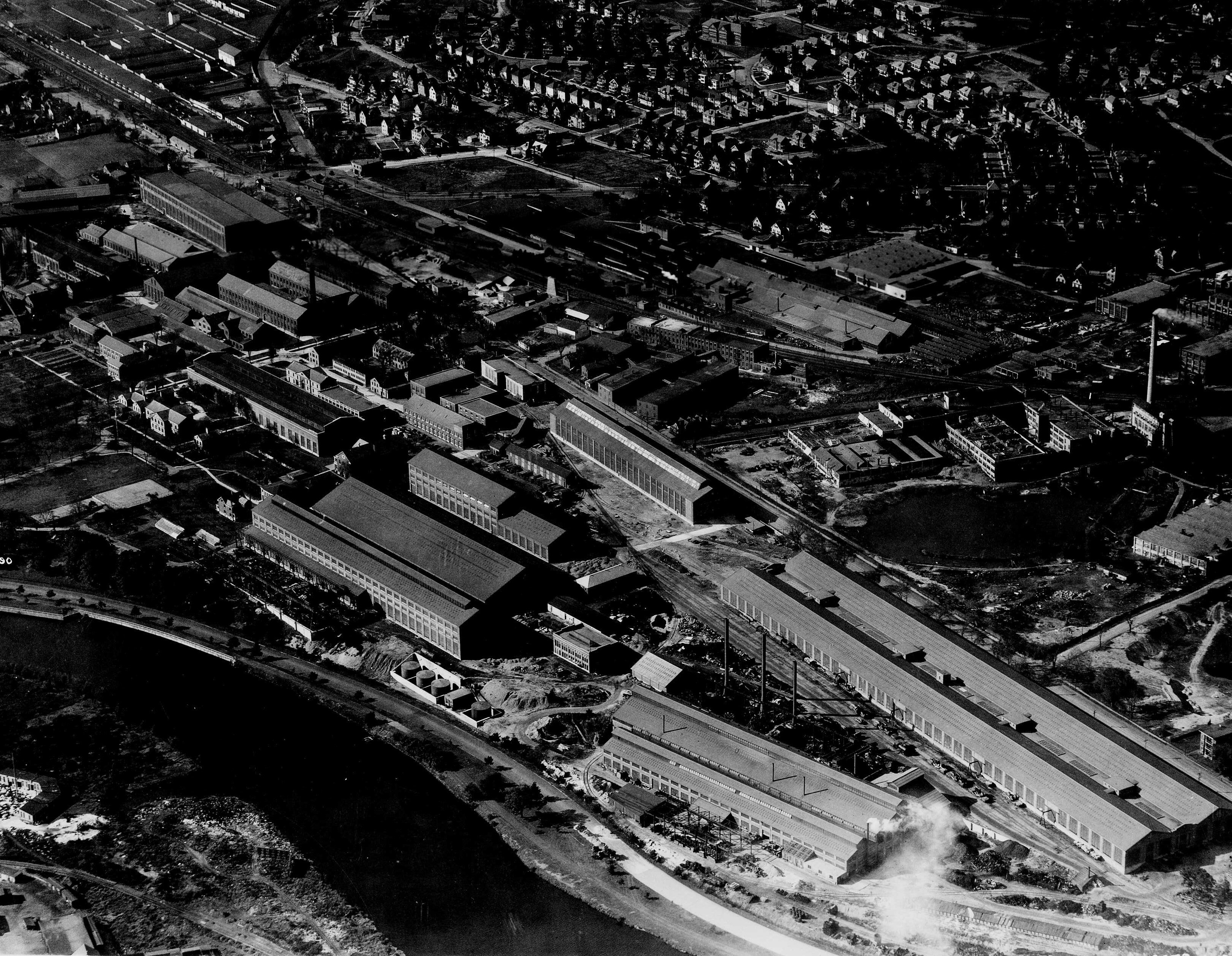
- Aerial view, 1921

- Location within Massachusetts Location within the United States
- Location: Watertown, Massachusetts
- Coordinates: 42°21′44″N 71°9′58″W
- Built: 1816
- NRHP reference No.: 99000498
- Added to NRHP: May 14, 1999

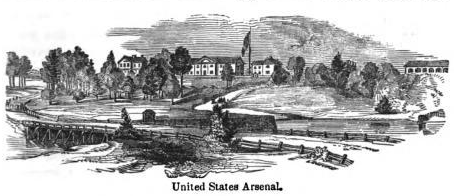
Watertown Arsenal c. 1847

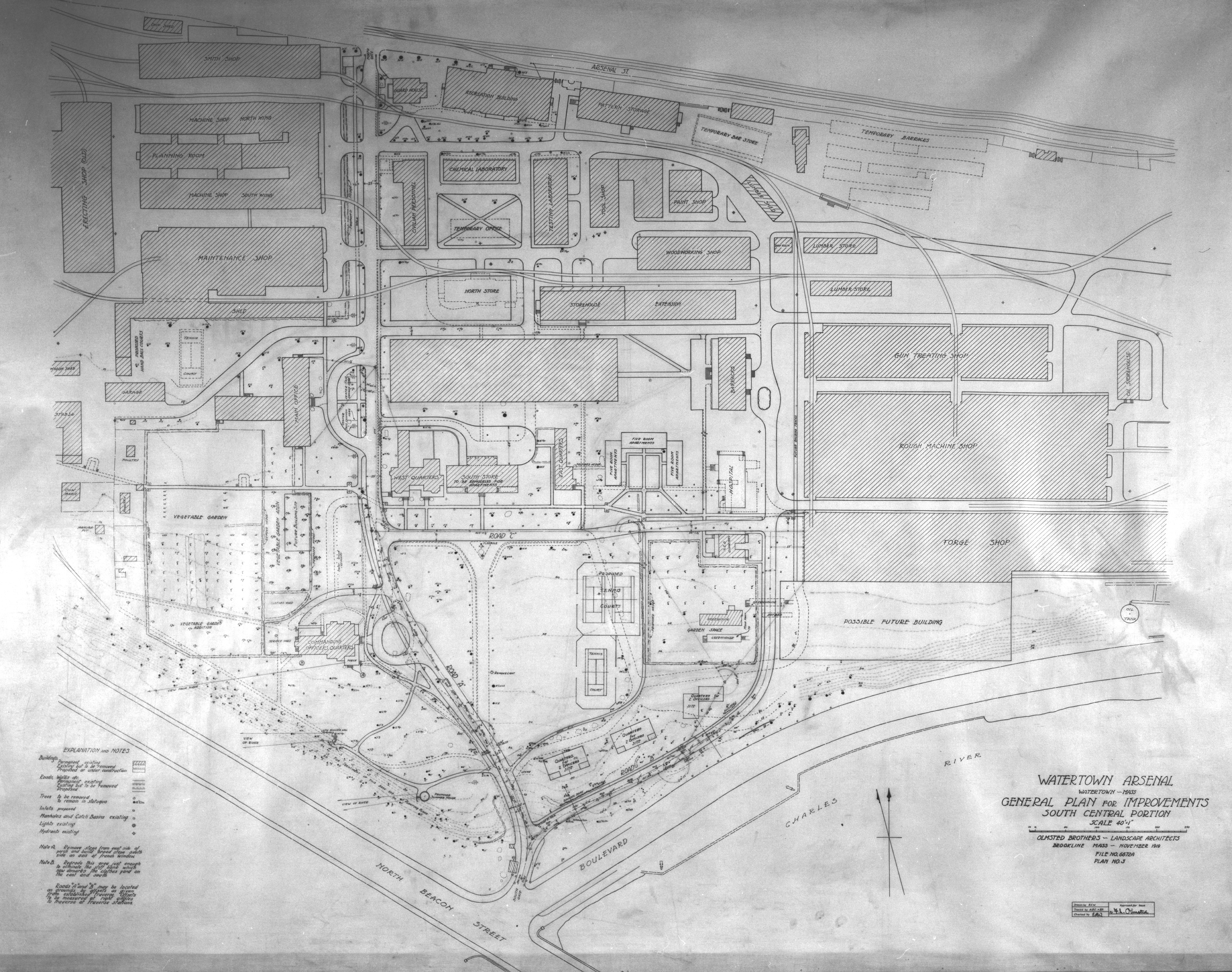
General plan, 1919

The Watertown Arsenal was a major American arsenal located on the northern shore of the Charles River in Watertown, Massachusetts. The site is now registered on the ASCE's List of Historic Civil Engineering Landmarks and on the US National Register of Historic Places, and it is home to a park, restaurants, mixed use office space, and formerly served as the national headquarters for athenahealth.

== History ==
The arsenal was established in 1816, on 40 acres (16 ha) of land, by the United States Army for the receipt, storage, and issuance of ammunition. In this role, it replaced the earlier Charlestown Arsenal. The arsenal's earliest plan incorporated 12 buildings aligned along a north–south axis overlooking the river. Alexander Parris, later designer of Quincy Market, was architect. Buildings included a military store and arsenal, as well as shops and housing for officers and men. All were made of brick with slate roofs in the Federal style, and a high wall enclosed the compound. By 1819 all buildings were completed and occupied.

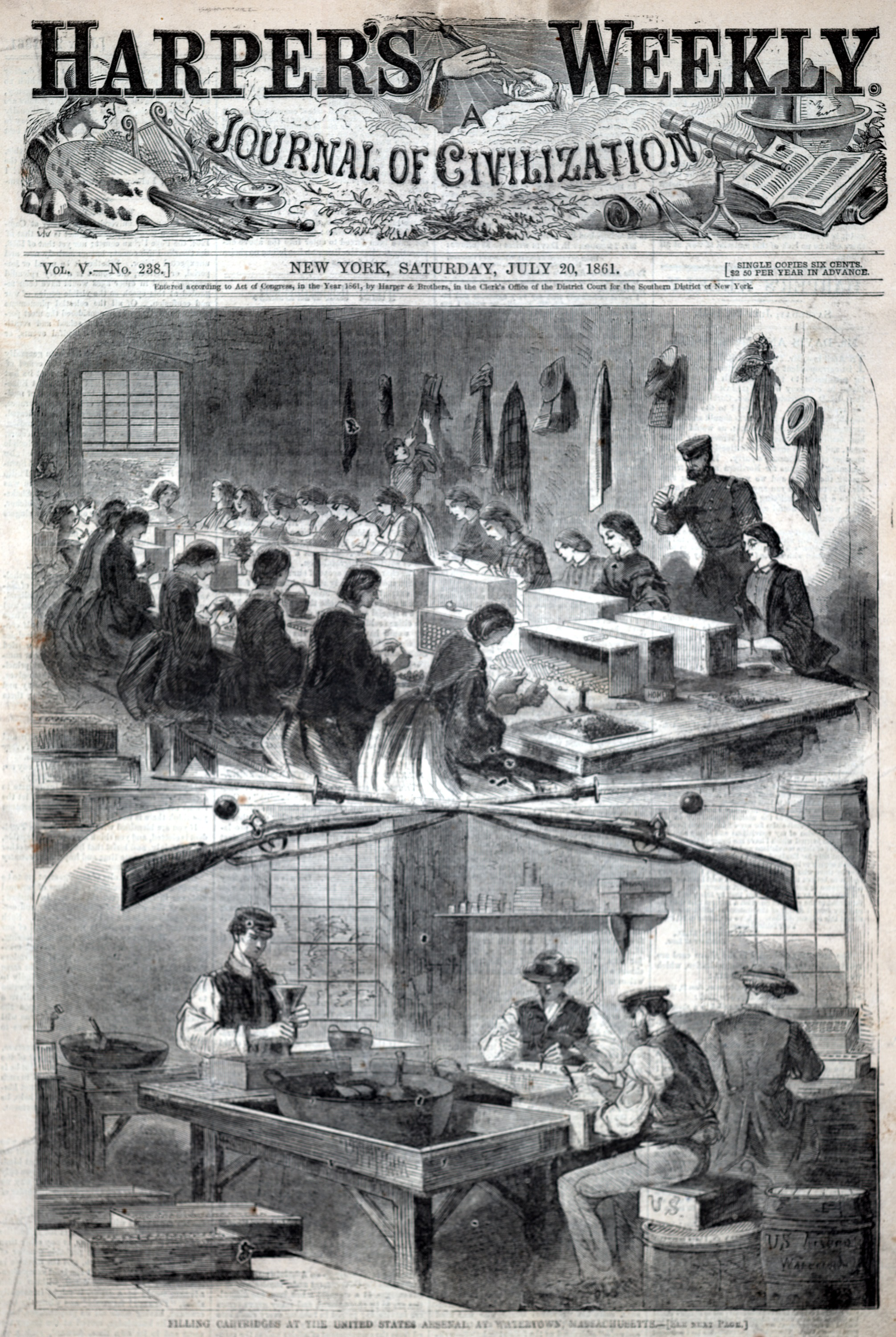
Filling Cartridges at the United States Arsenal at Watertown, Massachusetts, from Harper's Weekly, July 20, 1861

The arsenal's site, duties, and buildings grew gradually until the American Civil War, enlarging beyond the original quadrangle. During the war it greatly expanded to produce field and coastal gun carriages, and the war's impetus led to the quick construction of a large machine shop and smith shop built as contemporary factories, as well as a number of smaller buildings.

During the Civil War, a new commander's quarters was commissioned by then-Capt. Thomas J. Rodman, inventor of the Rodman gun. The lavish, 12,700 sq ft (1,180 m^{2}), quarters would ultimately become one of the largest commander's quarters on any US military installation. This mansion is now on the National Register of Historic Places. The expense ($63,478.65) was considered wasteful and excessive and drew a stern rebuke from Congress, which then promoted Rodman to brigadier general and sent him to command Rock Island Arsenal on the frontier in Illinois, where he built an even larger commander's quarters.

Activities and new construction at the Watertown Arsenal continued to gradually expand until the early 1890s.

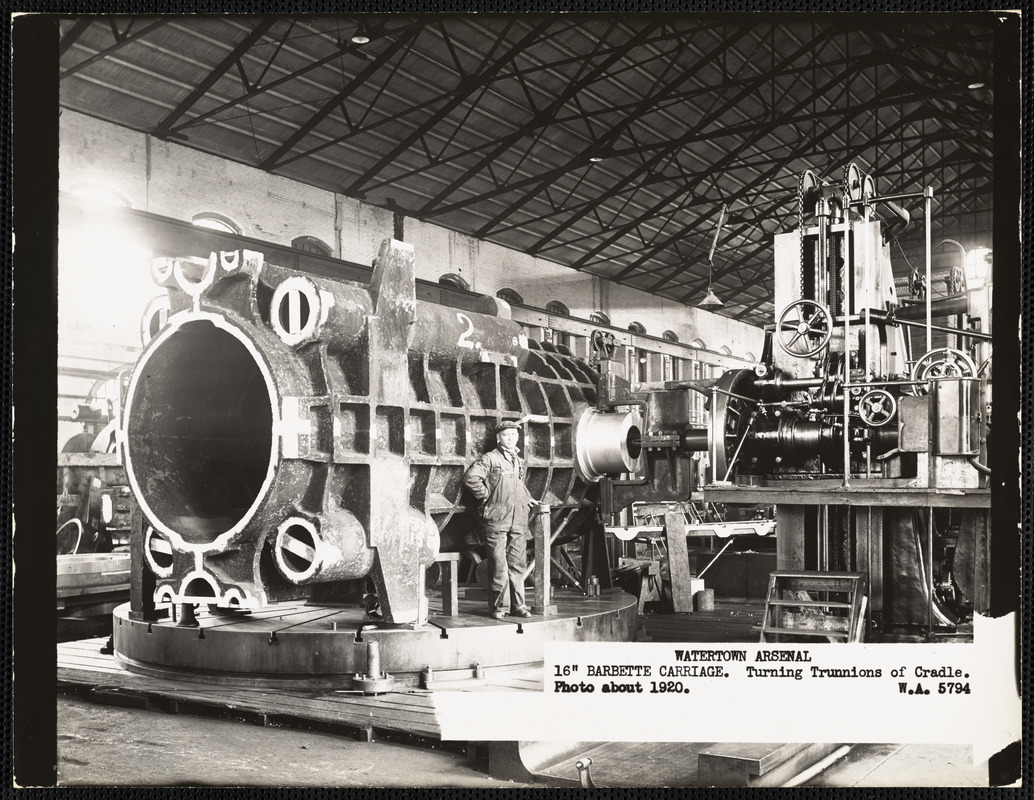
16" Barbette carriage, ca. 1920. Record Group 338: Records of U.S. Army Operational, Tactical, and Support Organizations (World War II and Thereafter), 1917 - 1999, National Archives at Boston

Activities changed decisively in 1892 when Congress authorized modernization to gun carriage manufacturing. At this point the arsenal became a manufacturing complex rather than storage depot. A number of major buildings were constructed, which over time began to reflect typical industrial facilities rather than the earlier arsenal styles. In 1897 an additional 44 acres (180,000 m^{2}) were purchased, and a hospital built.

Scientific management as designed by arsenal commander Charles Brewster Wheeler was implemented between 1908 and 1915. It was considered by the War Department as successful in saving money over the alternatives; but it was so hated by the work force that the Congress eventually overturned its use.

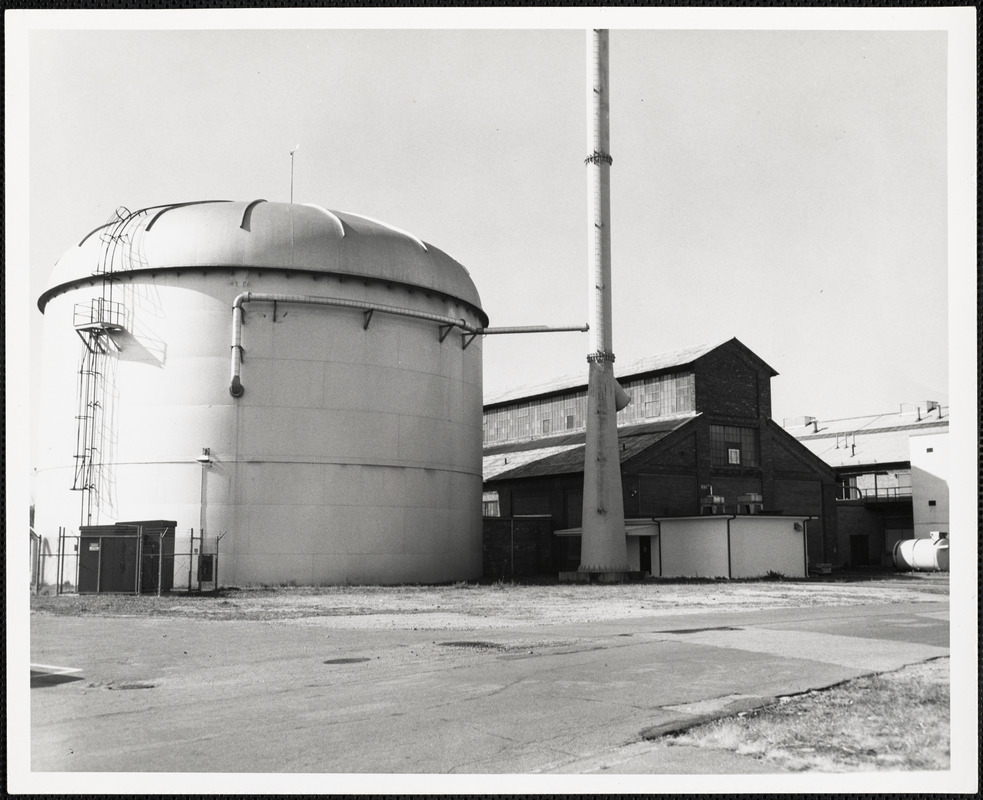
97 reactor, ca. 1963-1967. Record Group 338: Records of U.S. Army Operational, Tactical, and Support Organizations (World War II and Thereafter), 1917 - 1999, National Archives at Boston

During World War I the arsenal nearly tripled in size. Building #311 was then reported to be one of the largest steel-frame structures in the United States, sized to accommodate both very large gun carriages and the equipment used to construct them. Railroad tracks ran throughout the arsenal complex. World War II brought an additional 7 acres (28,000 m^{2}) with existing industrial buildings, as the arsenal produced steel artillery pieces. In 1959–1960, a research nuclear reactor (Horace Hardy Lester Reactor) was constructed on site, for material research programs, and operated there until 1970.

In 1968 the Army ceased operations at the arsenal; 45 acres (180,000 m^{2}) were sold to the Watertown Redevelopment Authority, while the remaining 48 acres (190,000 m^{2}) were converted to the United States Army Materials and Mechanics Research Center, renamed the United States Materials Technology Laboratory in 1985. In 1995 all Army activity ceased and the remainder of the site was converted to civilian use.

The Armory site was formerly included on US EPA's National Priorities List of highly contaminated sites, more widely known as Superfund. The site was removed from the NPL in 2006.

== See also ==
- List of Historic Civil Engineering Landmarks
- National Register of Historic Places listings in Middlesex County, Massachusetts
- List of military installations in Massachusetts

== Bibliography ==
- Aitken, Hugh G. J. (1985) [first published 1960], Scientific Management in Action: Taylorism at Watertown Arsenal, 1908–1915, Princeton University Press, ISBN 978-0-691-04241-1, LCCN 84026462. First published in 1960 by Harvard University Press. Republished in 1985 by Princeton University Press, with a new foreword by Merritt Roe Smith.
- Earls, Alan R., 2007 Watertown Arsenal, (Images of America), Arcadia Publishing, Charleston, SC, United States (ISBN 9780738549453).
- Dobbs, Judy D. (1977), A history of the Watertown Arsenal, 1816–1967, Watertown, MA, United States: U.S. Army Materials and Mechanics Research Center, OCLC 3826306. Republished by Via Appia Press. (ISBN 978-0-9825485-2-3)
- Drury, Horace Bookwalter (1915), Scientific management: a history and criticism, New York, United States: Columbia University.
