= 108th United States Colored Infantry Regiment =

- Active: 1864–1866
- Country: United States
- Allegiance: United States Union
- Branch: Infantry; United States Colored Troops
- Size: Regiment
- Engagements: American Civil War: Skirmish at Owensboro, Kentucky

The 108th United States Colored Infantry Regiment was a regiment composed of African-American troops recruited from Kentucky that served in the Union Army during the American Civil War. The 108th Regiment was assigned to guard duty at the Rock Island prisoner of war camp and occupation duty in Mississippi before being mustered out of service in 1866.

== Slavery and recruitment in Kentucky ==
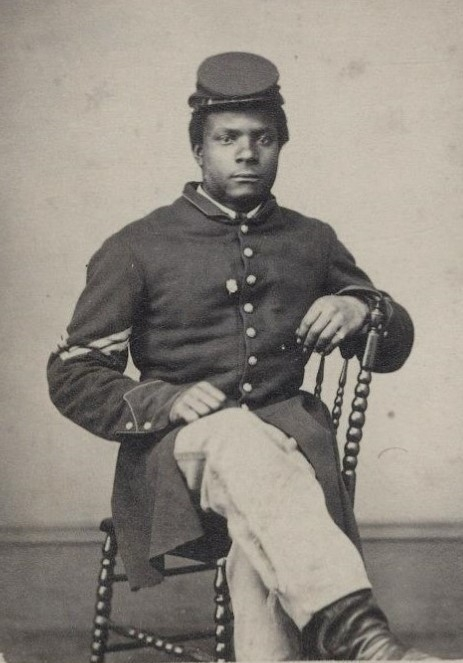
Corporal Kendrick Allen, 108th United States Colored Infantry

Slavery was legal in Kentucky until 1865, and as a border state Kentucky initially declared neutrality at the start of the secession crisis. The Federal government was anxious to keep Kentucky slaveholders friendly to the Union, Abraham Lincoln wrote in September 1861: "I think to lose Kentucky is nearly the same as to lose the whole game". A Confederate invasion of Kentucky in 1861 swayed the state to take a pro-Union stance, and many white Kentuckians joined the Union Army. The Enrollment Act of 1863 that authorized conscription in the North was amended in February 1864 to allow for conscription of Black soldiers into the US Army, specifying that any slave drafted into the military would be freed. This law was widely opposed by slave owners in the border states. Not only did the slaveholders feel that conscription would be robbing them of their "property", many whites were opposed in principle to Black troops joining the Army. In April General Stephen G. Burbridge, a native Kentuckian, modified the recruiting procedures for Kentucky: slaves would only be accepted into the army with the slaveholder's consent, and owners would be compensated. Many slaves went to join the army, with or without permission, and by June General Burbridge ordered that any man wishing to join would be accepted. By September 1864, more than 14,000 Black Kentuckians had joined the army.

== Unit history ==
The 108th US Colored Infantry was organized in June - August 1864 at Louisville. The commanding officer of the Regiment was Colonel John S. Bishop. All officers of the United States Colored Troops during the Civil War were white; Black soldiers would not be commissioned as officers in the US Army until after the war.

In August 1864, the 108th defeated a group of 60 Confederate guerillas near Owensboro, Kentucky, a few weeks later 3 soldiers from the 108th were killed in a revenge attack. In October, the regiment was sent to Rock Island, Illinois to guard a prison camp for Confederate POWs there. Approximately 50 men of the 108th died of disease and other causes while guarding the prison, and are buried at Rock Island National Cemetery.

Assigned to occupation duty in Mississippi during Reconstruction, the soldiers of the US Colored Troops were subject to racist violence. A soldier of the 108th was assassinated by locals at Okolona, Mississippi, in October 1865; his killer was never brought to justice. The regiment was mustered out of service on March 21, 1866.

== See also ==
- List of United States Colored Troops Civil War Units
- United States Colored Troops
