= Rock Island Arsenal Museum =

United States army museum

- Former name: Ordnance Museum
- Established: 1905
- Location: Rock Island Arsenal; Rock Island County, Illinois
- Coordinates: 41.516944°N 90.541944°W
- Type: United States Army
- Public transit access: Quad Cities MetroLINK

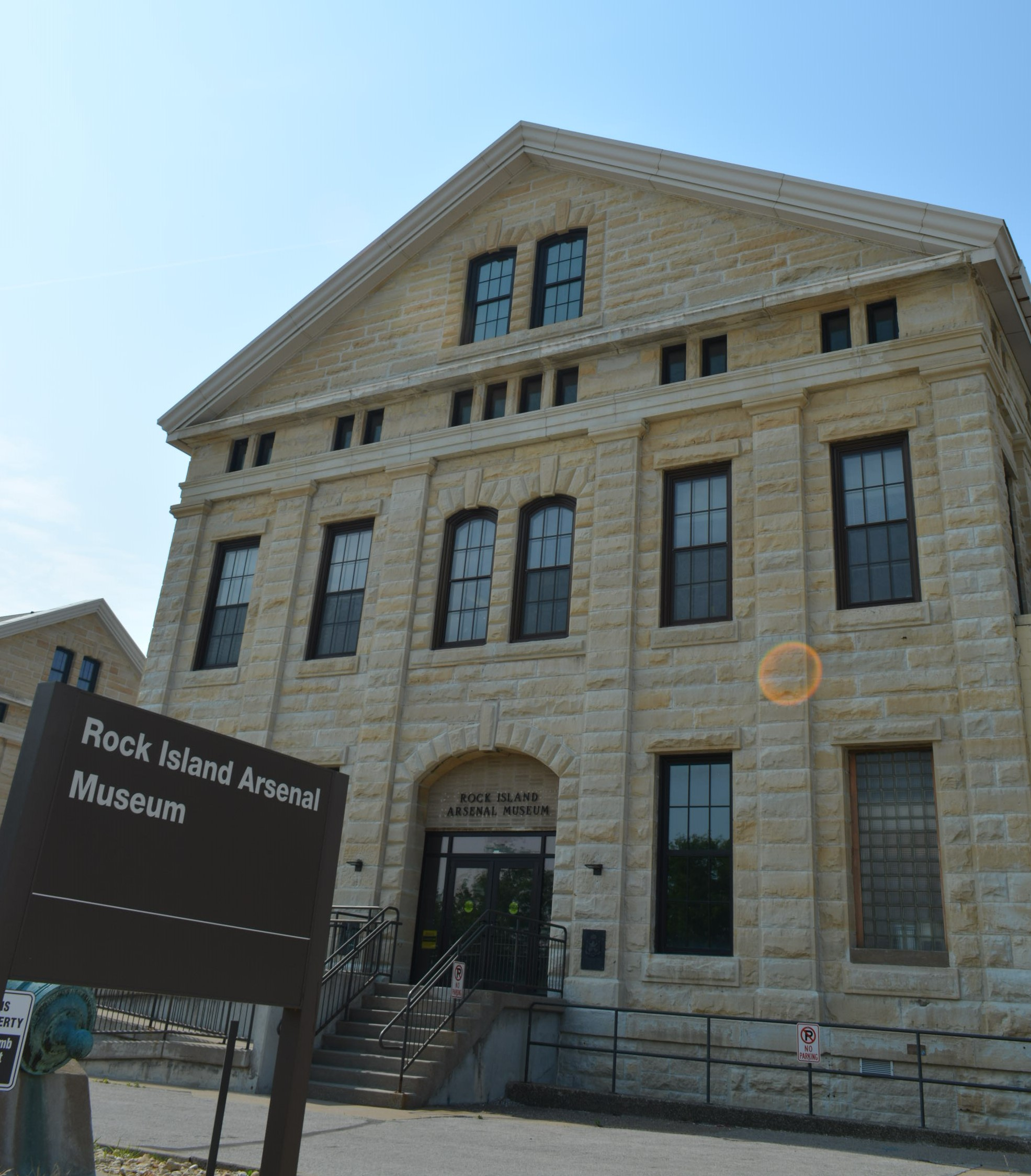
Rock Island Arsenal Museum, Building 60

The Rock Island Arsenal Museum explores the history of Arsenal Island, its commands and the history of Army manufacturing at Rock Island Arsenal. It is the second oldest museum of the United States Army.

== History ==
The Rock Island Arsenal Museum opened on July 4, 1905 as The Ordnance Museum at Rock Island Arsenal. It is the second oldest U.S. Army Museum, just behind the West Point Museum, which opened in 1854.

The museum's origins date to an October 1, 1903 letter from U.S. Army Chief of Ordnance Major General William Crozier who notified the Rock Island Arsenal commander that fifteen boxes of ordnance materiel would shortly arrive for the purpose of preserving it in a Military Museum to be established at the Rock Island Arsenal.

The boxes included an array of weapons and accouterments from foreign countries that had been forwarded to the Office of the Chief of Ordnance for study. In correspondence to Colonel Stanhope Blunt at Rock Island Arsenal, Major General Crozier directed that a suitable building be selected as a museum to display this ordnance materiel for research and for the interest of the general public.

The museum was first housed in Shop A (Building 102 today). In 1917 manufacturing space was needed to support the war effort during World War I, and the museum collection was placed in storage.

At the request of the local community, the museum reopened in its original location on July 4, 1919, and was given the title, The Rock Island Arsenal Museum. The museum’s focus remained on small arms and ordnance; however, aspects of Rock Island Arsenal history were included in the exhibits for the first time.

The museum closed again during World War II to free up manufacturing and warehousing space. It reopened in May of 1948 at its current location in Building 60. The museum was renamed the John M. Browning Memorial Museum on November 4, 1959, in “recognition of Mr. Browning’s contributions to ordnance technology and the armed forces.” During this time, the museum became known for its arms collection, a diverse collection of foreign, US, military, and civilian weapons.

On July 1, 1986, the museum was renamed the Rock Island Arsenal Museum. The phrase “People, Processes, and Products” was coined to explain the important themes in the history of Rock Island Arsenal. While still known for its collection of small arms, the Museum refocused itself on the history of the island, its commands, and the products of the Arsenal.

Today, the Museum carries that legacy forward by focusing on the impact the Arsenal has made on the history of the U.S. military, the Quad Cities region, and its role in National Defense today as part of the U.S. Army Organic Industrial Base.

The museum reopened on June 29, 2023 following a $2.5 million renovation.

== Collection ==
The Rock Island Arsenal's collection includes more than 7,000 artifacts documenting the history of Arsenal Island from the local native inhabitants to current production at Rock Island Arsenal today.

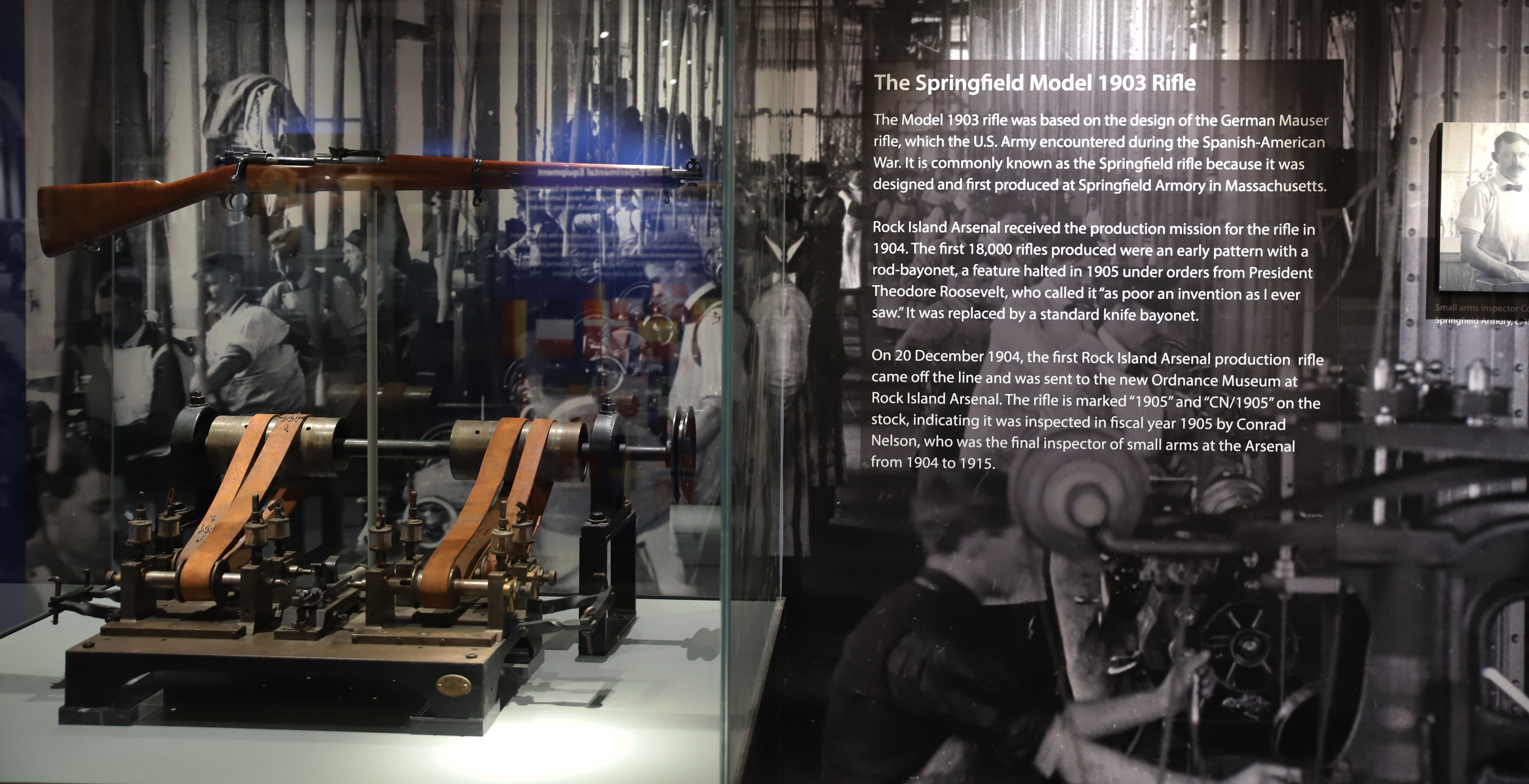
M1903 Springfield Serial No. 1 on display at the Rock Island Arsenal Museum.

Among the highlight artifacts in the collection are Serial No. 1 M1903 Springfield Rifle produced at Rock Island Arsenal, Serial No. 2 M1 Garand produced at Springfield Armory, experimental ordnance and weapons systems, and Mark VIII "Liberty" Tank produced at Rock Island Arsenal.

== Exhibits ==
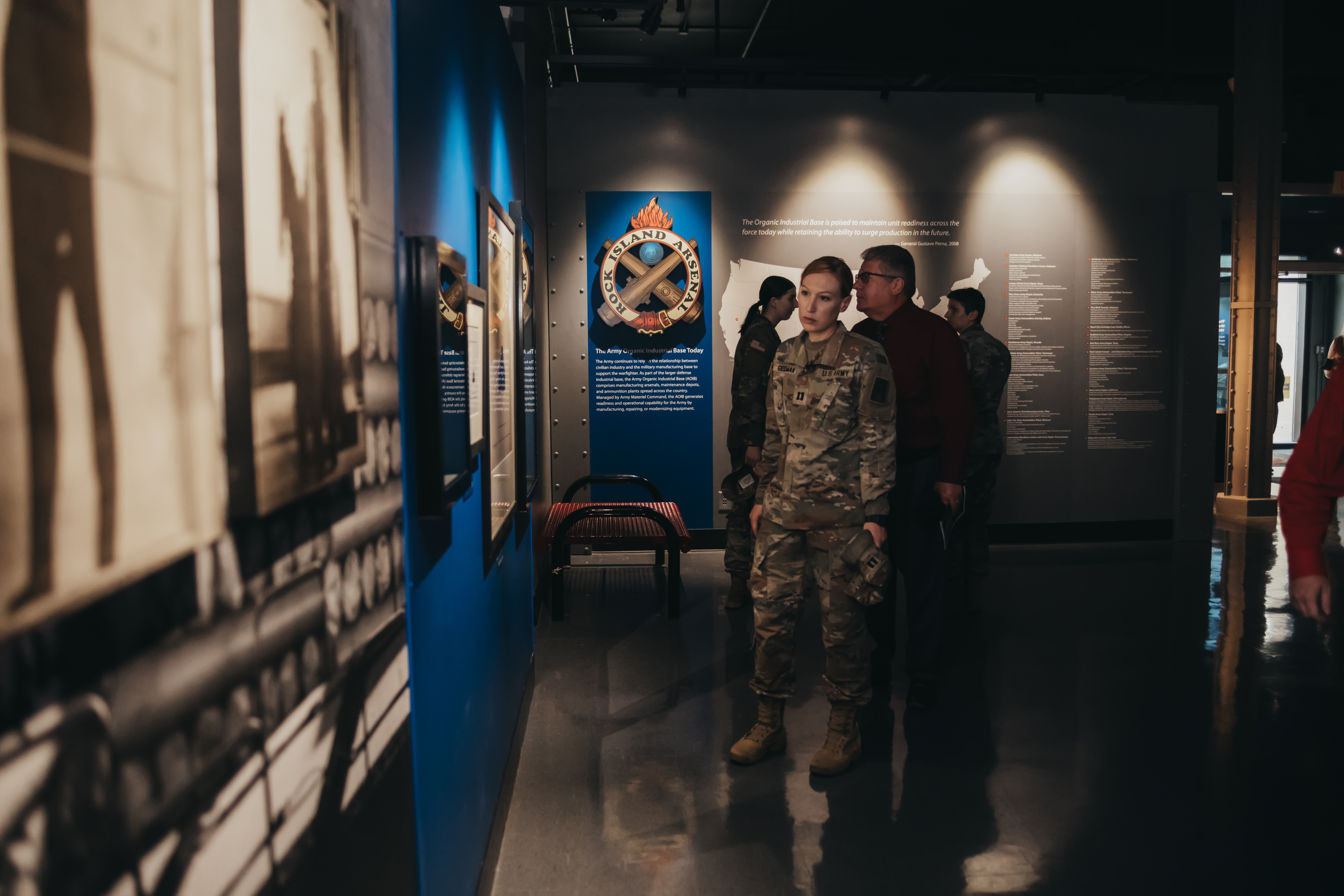
Rock Island Arsenal Museum exhibits, June 29, 2023

The Rock Island Arsenal Museum’s core exhibits explore the history of the island and the Arsenal from 1805 to the present. Visitors will discover the impact that Rock Island Arsenal has had on National Defense and the contributions of the Quad Cities to the U.S. Military. This story is told through more than 250 artifacts, hundreds of photos, and digital and physical interactives.

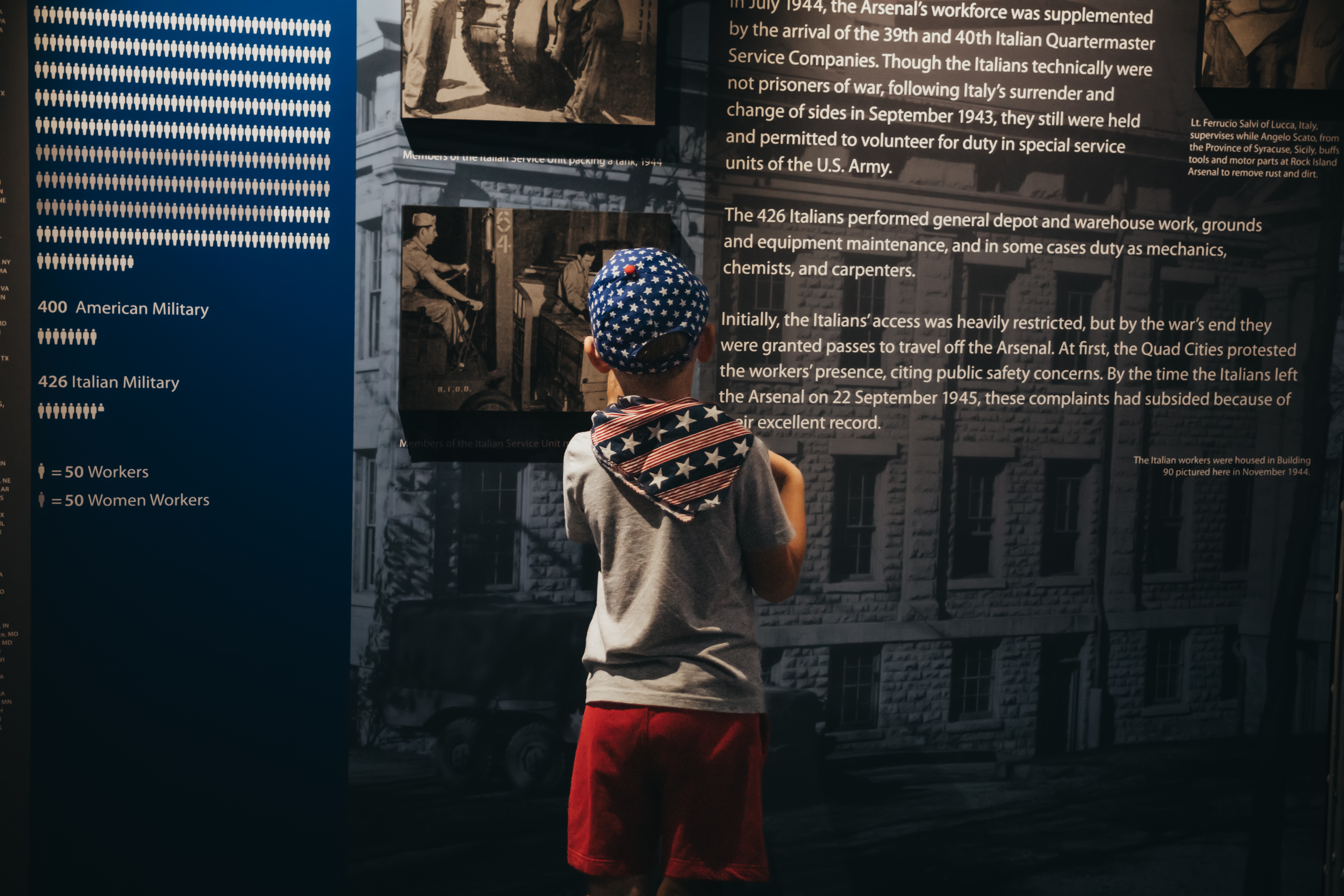
A visitor explores the Rock Island Arsenal Museum exhibits during the reopening on June 29, 2023.
