= Hurd v. Rock Island Bridge Co. =

Civil case argued by Abraham Lincoln

Hurd v. Rock Island Bridge Company
- Court: United States Circuit Court for Northern Illinois (U.S. Circuit Court at Chicago)
- Decided: September 8, 1857

Hurd v. Rock Island Bridge Company (1857) is an American civil case that allowed railroads to continue to cross the Mississippi River on bridges, over the protests of steamboat enterprises that requested unfettered access to the channel. One of the lawyers for the rail companies, Abraham Lincoln, earned some degree of fame for his victory, which later led to him becoming the President of the United States.

== Case ==
America's expansion west, which Lincoln strongly supported, was seen as an economic threat to the river trade, which ran north-to-south, primarily on the Mississippi River. In 1856, a steamboat collided with the Rock Island bridge, built by the Rock Island Railroad, between Rock Island, Illinois, and Davenport, Iowa. It was the first railroad bridge to span the Mississippi. The steamboat owner, Captain John Hurd, filed suit in the U.S. Circuit Court at Chicago for damages and claimed the bridge was a hazard to navigation.

Lincoln was lead counsel in court for the railroad, in a jury trial before the United States Circuit Court for Northern Illinois in Chicago. The trial was presided over by Supreme Court justice John McLean. The jury deadlocked at 9 to 3 in the railroad's favor. Although the case did not reach a final judgment, observers considered the outcome a surprising victory for the railroad. Lincoln's role in the case helped solidify his reputation as a skilled trial attorney.

The legal issues around the Rock Island Bridge were not fully resolved until the United States Supreme Court ruled on a different case, Mississippi and Missouri Railroad Company v. Ward, in 1863. By recognizing the railroad's right to place a bridge across the waterway, the resolution of the matter in the railroad's favor removed a costly impediment to railroad expansion west of the Mississippi River.
