= USS Witek =

Gearing-class destroyer

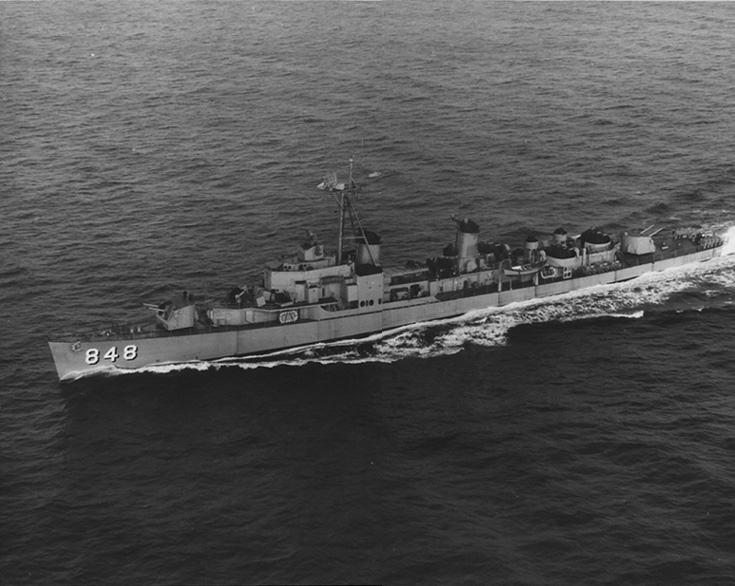
- USS Witek between 1954 and 1957

History

United States
- Name: USS Witek
- Namesake: Frank P. Witek
- Builder: Bath Iron Works, Bath, Maine
- Laid down: 16 July 1945
- Launched: 2 February 1946
- Commissioned: 23 April 1946
- Decommissioned: 19 August 1968
- Stricken: 17 September 1968
- Identification: Callsign: NBCI; Hull number: DD-848
- Fate: Sunk as a target, 4 July 1969

General characteristics
- Class & type: Gearing-class destroyer
- Displacement: 3,460 long tons (3,516 t) full
- Length: 390 ft 6 in (119.02 m)
- Beam: 40 ft 10 in (12.45 m)
- Draft: 14 ft 4 in (4.37 m)
- Propulsion: Geared turbines, 2 shafts, 60,000 shp (45 MW)
- Speed: 35 knots (65 km/h; 40 mph)
- Range: 4,500 nmi (8,300 km) at 20 kn (37 km/h; 23 mph)
- Complement: 336
- Armament: 6 × 5"/38 caliber guns; 12 × 40 mm AA guns; 11 × 20 mm AA guns; 10 × 21-inch (533 mm) torpedo tubes; 6 × depth charge projectors; 2 × depth charge tracks

USS Witek (DD/EDD-848) was a Gearing-class destroyer of the United States Navy, named for Marine Private First Class Frank P. Witek (1921–1944), who was awarded the Medal of Honor posthumously for his heroism during the Battle of Guam.

Witek was laid down on 16 July 1945 at Bath, Maine, by the Bath Iron Works; launched on 2 February 1946; sponsored by Mrs. Nora Witek, the mother of PFC Witek; and commissioned at the Boston Naval Shipyard on 23 April 1946.

== Service history ==
=== 1946–1957 ===
Witek departed Boston on 27 May, bound for Cuban waters, and reached Guantanamo Bay on 1 June. She conducted shakedown training out of Guantanamo until 2 July, when she headed north, returning to Boston on 6 July for post-shakedown availability. Fitted out for experimental development work in anti-submarine warfare (ASW) systems, Witek received the classification of EDD-848. She arrived at New London, Connecticut, her new home port, on 7 December 1946.

Over the next 20 years, Witek operated primarily off the eastern seaboard of the United States from Narragansett Bay to the Virginia Capes and to Key West, Florida She ranged on occasion into the Caribbean and touched at places such as Nassau, Bahamas; Guantanamo Bay and Havana, Cuba; the Panama Canal Zone; St. Croix, Virgin Islands; Bridgetown, Barbados; San Juan, Puerto Rico; Hampton Roads; and Boston. On one occasion, the ship visited the West Coast – spending six months in operations out of San Diego, California, testing the sound gear formerly installed in the German heavy cruiser Prinz Eugen – in mid-1948. During those tests, carried out under the supervision of the Naval Electronics Laboratory, Witek's silhouette took on a decidedly different "look" compared to that usually associated with a Gearing-class destroyer. Her second twin 5-inch gun mount (mount 52) was removed at the Boston Naval Shipyard, and its place was taken by the "house-trailer full" of former German electronics equipment. These tests included the sonic listening device GHG, which had been used heavily by German submarines. That "trailer" was eventually removed at the Norfolk Naval Shipyard in the autumn of 1950. Its place was taken, in turn, by a trainable Mk. 15 "hedgehog" anti-submarine mortar.

While at Nassau, Bahamas, in late October 1954, Witek went to the aid of the local fire department in the British colony when a serious fire threatened the city. Faced with a bad warehouse fire, 140 men from Witek rushed into action with 3,000 feet of fire hose, walkie-talkie radio sets, "smoke-eater" masks, four fog applicators, and two portable pumps on Sunday, 24 October. Working for two hours alongside Nassau police, firemen, and volunteers, Witek's sailors earned a unanimous vote of thanks in "helping stem what might have been the most disastrous fire in the Colony's history."

Due to the nature of Witek's work, her routine was little publicized, and she gained none of the overseas deployment excitement in the course of her more than two decades of experimental work. She made no deployments to the Mediterranean nor any to the western Pacific; in addition, she never visited European waters. Outside visiting La Guaira, Venezuela, the seaport for Caracas, in January 1948, Witek spent most of her underway time off the eastern seaboard and in the western Atlantic – sometimes in the Caribbean – participating in experimental exercises with other units of the Operational Development Force based at New London. She operated primarily with other experimental ships, such as Maloy (EDE-791), and submarines, testing ASW electronics installations. On some occasions, when she conducted project work out of New London, she would slip up the coast to Rockland, Maine, or to Portsmouth, N.H. Her local operations in Long Island Sound even earned her the nickname: "The Galloping Ghost of the Long Island Coast."

On occasion, though, outside her normal independent routine, Witek conducted exercises with carrier task forces for ASW maneuvers. During one such evolution in 1955, Witek exercised with the fleet carrier Leyte (CVS-32) and the atomic submarine Nautilus; other carriers with which Witek operated included Antietam and Randolph.

=== 1958–1968 ===
Besides carrying out operational tests of ASW electronics equipment, Witek served as the test-bed for the "pump jet" propulsion system. On 2 July 1958, Witek entered Drydock No. 4 at the Boston Naval Shipyard for an "extensive overhaul and installation of the pump jet system." The destroyer remained in drydock at Boston until a little over a week before Christmas, when she emerged with the new system installed. Over the ensuing years, Witek tested the system under operational conditions. In 1960, she operated for a time with Task Group Alpha, the first time in four years since she had operated with the fleet. She conducted extensive ASW operations with that unit until returning to her home port.

Due to the grounding of Bache in early 1968, Witek was retained in active service. Subsequently, decommissioned at Norfolk, Virginia, on 19 August 1968, the ship's name was struck from the Navy List on 17 September 1968. She was then berthed at the Inactive Ship Facility, Norfolk, to await final disposition. Witek was sunk as a target off Virginia on 4 July 1969.
