= Edward J. Moskala =

- Born: November 6, 1921; Chicago, Illinois, US
- Died: April 9, 1945 (aged 23); Kakazu Ridge, Okinawa Island
- Burial place: Rock Island National Cemetery; Rock Island, Illinois
- Military career
- Allegiance: United States
- Branch: United States Army
- Rank: Private First Class
- Units: 383rd Infantry Regiment, 96th Infantry Division
- Conflicts: World War II: Battle of Okinawa
- Awards: Medal of Honor

Edward J. Moskala (November 6, 1921 – April 9, 1945) was a United States Army soldier and a recipient of the United States military's highest decoration—the Medal of Honor—for his actions during the Battle of Okinawa in World War II.

Moskala joined the Army from his birth city of Chicago, Illinois, and by April 9, 1945, was serving as a private first class in Company C, 383rd Infantry Regiment, 96th Infantry Division. On that day, at Kakazu Ridge on Okinawa Island, he destroyed two enemy machine gun positions before voluntarily staying behind to cover his unit's withdrawal. He later helped rescue wounded men who had been left behind and was killed while aiding another wounded comrade. He was posthumously awarded the Medal of Honor ten months later, on February 26, 1946.

Moskala, aged 23 at his death, was buried in Rock Island National Cemetery, Rock Island, Illinois.

== Medal of Honor citation ==
Private First Class Moskala's official Medal of Honor citation reads:

He was the leading element when grenade explosions and concentrated machinegun and mortar fire halted the unit's attack on Kakazu Ridge, Okinawa, Ryukyu Islands. With utter disregard for his personal safety, he charged 40 yards through withering, grazing fire and wiped out 2 machinegun nests with well-aimed grenades and deadly accurate fire from his automatic rifle. When strong counterattacks and fierce enemy resistance from other positions forced his company to withdraw, he voluntarily remained behind with 8 others to cover the maneuver. Fighting from a critically dangerous position for 3 hours, he killed more than 25 Japanese before following his surviving companions through screening smoke down the face of the ridge to a gorge where it was discovered that one of the group had been left behind, wounded. Unhesitatingly, Pvt. Moskala climbed the bullet-swept slope to assist in the rescue, and, returning to lower ground, volunteered to protect other wounded while the bulk of the troops quickly took up more favorable positions. He had saved another casualty and killed 4 enemy infiltrators when he was struck and mortally wounded himself while aiding still another disabled soldier. With gallant initiative, unfaltering courage, and heroic determination to destroy the enemy, Pvt. Moskala gave his life in his complete devotion to his company's mission and his comrades' well-being. His intrepid conduct provided a lasting inspiration for those with whom he served.

== Awards and decorations ==

| Badge | Combat Infantryman Badge | | |
| 1st row | Medal of Honor | | |
| 2nd row | Bronze Star Medal | Purple Heart | Army Good Conduct Medal |
| 3rd row | American Campaign Medal | Asiatic-Pacific Campaign Medal with Arrowhead Device and 1 Campaign star | World War II Victory Medal |

== See also ==
- List of Medal of Honor recipients
