= Government Bridge =

Bridge connecting Rock Island, Illinois and Davenport, Iowa

- The Government Bridge rotating
- Coordinates: 41°31′09″N 90°34′01″W
- Carries: 2 lanes of roadway 2 rail lines of Iowa Interstate Railroad
- Crosses: Mississippi River
- Locale: Davenport, Iowa and Rock Island, Illinois
- Maintained by: Federal government of the United States

Characteristics
- Design: Two riveted Pratt trusses Five riveted Baltimore trusses One pin-connected Baltimore swing truss
- Material: Steel
- Total length: 1,608 feet (490 m)
- Width: 27 feet (8 m)
- Longest span: 365 feet (111 m) (swing); longest fixed spans 258 feet (79 m)
- No. of spans: 8

History
- Designer: Ralph Modjeski
- Constructed by: U.S. Army
- Construction start: 1895
- Opened: 1896; 130 years ago

Statistics
- Daily traffic: 16,800

Location
- Interactive map of Government Bridge

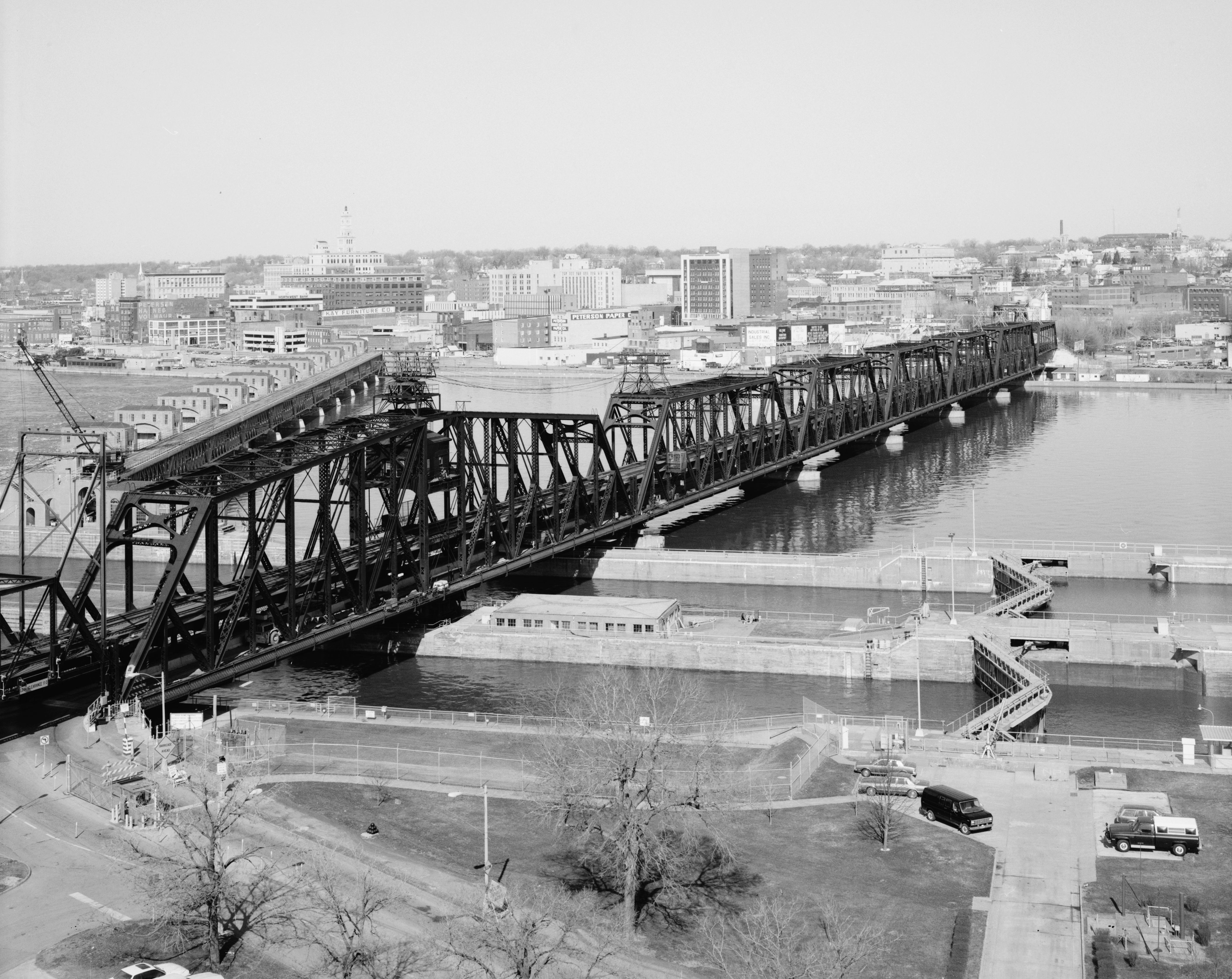
Three-quarter view from the Clock Tower Building (Building 205), looking north-northwest toward Davenport, Iowa

The Government Bridge or Arsenal Bridge spans the Mississippi River, connecting Rock Island, Illinois and Davenport, Iowa. The Iowa Interstate Railroad uses the upper deck of the bridge for its ex-Chicago and Rock Island Railroad route between Council Bluffs, Iowa and Chicago, Illinois. The lower deck carries automobile traffic between the two cities. It is located near Upper Mississippi Mile Marker 483, adjacent to the Mississippi River Lock and Dam No. 15. The current structure (which was completed in 1896) is the fourth at this location. The bridges all were built with a swing section to accommodate traffic navigating the river.

The first Rock Island Bridge, which was finished in 1856, was the first railroad bridge across the Mississippi. The bridge was 1,582 feet (482 m) long, and the draw-span was 285 feet (87 m). It was located upstream from the current bridge. It was a threat to the South (which sought to create a southern rail route to the Pacific) and to St. Louis, whose steamboats faced competition from Chicago's railroads. The Effie Afton struck the bridge weeks after it opened, and steamboat companies brought lawsuits. It was repaired, but was replaced in 1866 by a wooden structure in the same location. In 1868, the second bridge was damaged by an ice storm and a tornado; however, construction crews repaired and reopened the bridge. It was replaced in 1872 by a twin double-deck bridge. The third bridge, 366 ft (112 m) long, was built downstream near the Rock Island shore in the present location. During the 1880s, the bridge accommodated horse-drawn trolley cars. Electric trolleys ran on the current bridge until 1940.

== History ==
=== First Rock Island Bridge 1856 ===
The first Rock Island Bridge, constructed in the 1850s and located about 1,500 feet (460 m) upstream of the present bridge, was the first railroad bridge to span the Mississippi River. It played a prominent role in the period before the American Civil War and construction of the First transcontinental railroad. The bridge connected the Chicago and Rock Island Railroad with the newly-created Mississippi and Missouri Railroad, proposed by Thomas C. Durant as Iowa's first railroad (linking Davenport and Council Bluffs). Companies operating steamships on the Mississippi opposed the bridge, fearing that it would pose a navigation hazard and alter their monopoly on trade. The bridge opened on April 22, 1856.

==== Description ====
The Surveying party for laying the bridge was led by Colonel Robert E. Lee The total of the bridge was 1,582 feet (482 m) long, and its draw-span was 285 feet (87 m) long. The bridge was built by utilizing timber and iron, which rested on granite piers. The draw-span allowed an opening of 120 feet (37 m) on both sides to let steamboats pass through. The lower deck of the bridge, which was 35 feet (11 m) above water, was used for wagons while the upper deck was used for railway traffic.

==== Post-completion history ====
Since the bridge crossed the island which used to be the home of Fort Armstrong, the Department of War had a say in its construction. Secretary of War Jefferson Davis and President Franklin Pierce initially approved the bridge; thinking that the transcontinental railroad would go through the South to Los Angeles. He later changed his mind as resistance to that plan began to surface, fearing that the transcontinental railroad would now take a northern route. Davis ordered the construction halted, but he was ignored.

==== Effie Afton collision ====
On May 6, 1856, the steamer Effie Afton collided with the bridge after one of its paddles stopped. The crew were rescued, but the steamer caught fire, damaged the bridge, and sank. Steamboat companies sued to have the bridge dismantled. The Mississippi and Missouri Railroad (M&M) and the Rock Island Line hired Abraham Lincoln to defend the bridge. The case, Hurd v. Rock Island Bridge Co., ended in a hung jury in the circuit court in Chicago, and was dismissed. The case ultimately worked its way to the Supreme Court. In the meantime, the M&M and Rock Island merged to become the Chicago, Rock Island and Pacific Railroad. At the time of the collision, the bridge was built in a difficult part of the rapids, and its draw-span was at an angle to the current (making the bridge hard for steamboats to clear). Many felt that the bridge had been designed to interfere with steamboat traffic.

Durant took his earnings from the M&M merger to form the Union Pacific Railroad. Lincoln, as part of his research as an attorney, visited M&M facilities and met with M&M officials in Council Bluffs. When the Pacific Railway Act of 1862 gave him the power to choose the eastern terminus of the transcontinental railroad, he picked a location favorable to his former clients. The case trial ended in a hung jury, and was dismissed; the Supreme Court ruled on a subsequent suit on December 18, 1862, and the bridge remained operational.

=== Expansion 1866 ===
The first bridge only lasted until 1866 without renovations, as by then it was considered inadequate for the ever-increasing loads carried by the railroad. Its superstructure was replaced by a larger wooden structure, which reused the original piers. All that remains of the first bridge is an elevated approach west of River Drive on the Iowa side, and a reconstructed pier on Arsenal Island. The second bridge had two decks: a lower deck for pedestrians and an upper deck for railroad traffic.

In March 1868, an ice floe damaged the bridge's piers and timber spans and preventing rail traffic, and less than a week later, an apparent tornado damaged the bridge; construction crews from Chicago were able to reopen it. On July 20, 1868, Congress authorized the construction of the current Government Bridge.

=== Current bridge 1872 ===
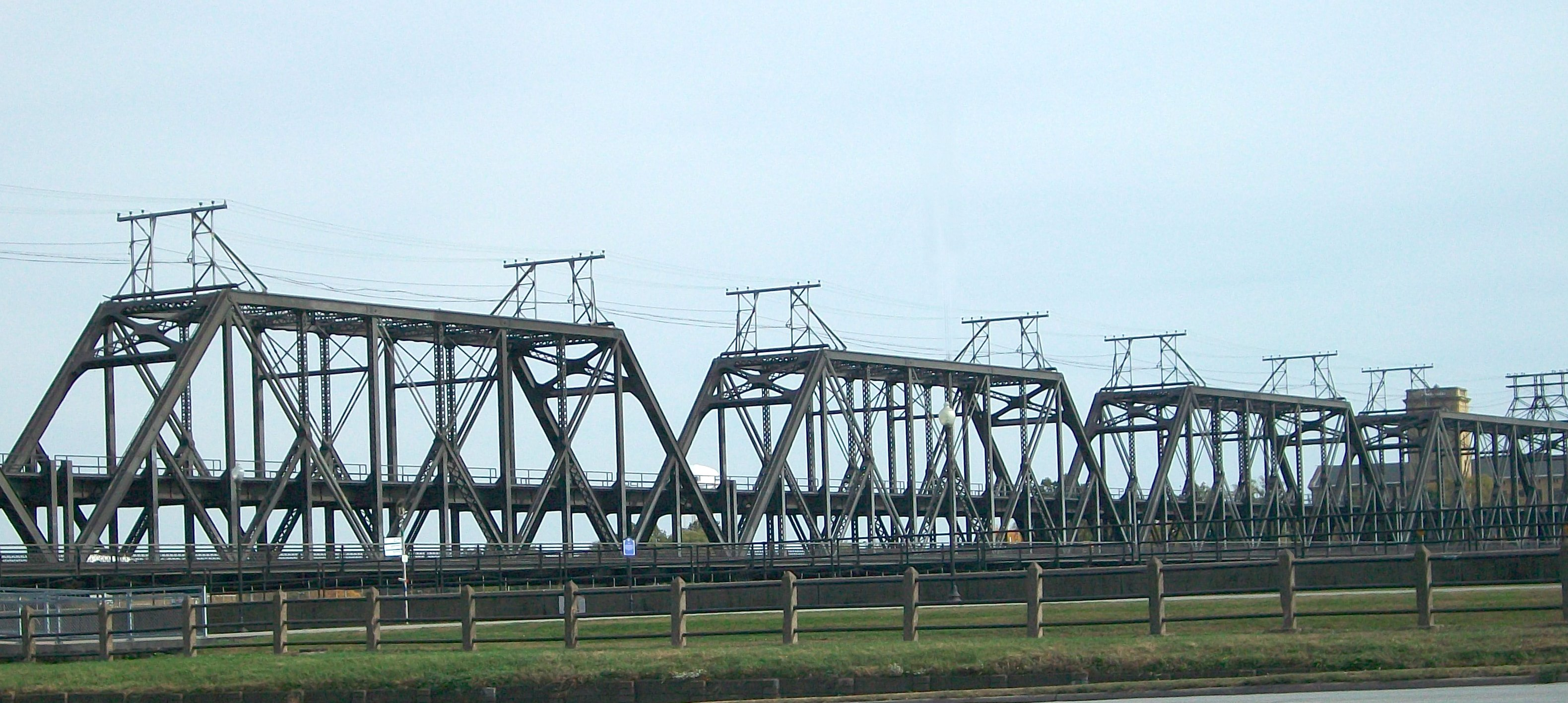
The bridge today

The wooden structure was replaced by an iron, twin double-deck bridge in 1872 which carried a single-track rail line and a roadway. This bridge was at a new location on the western tip of Arsenal Island, and the original bridge and rail line were abandoned. The relocation was driven by the federal government, which still owned the island and wished to redevelop it as an arsenal. The original bridge and rail line divided the property in two, and the development constraint was removed by moving the bridge to one end of the island. The federal government used this bridge for access to the railroad, giving rise to its name.

The railways used the upper deck, and wagons, livestock and pedestrians used the lower deck. This bridge was 366 ft (112 m) long, and was located near the Rock Island shore. Starting in the 1880s, the bridge began serving horse-drawn trolley cars and electric trolleys.

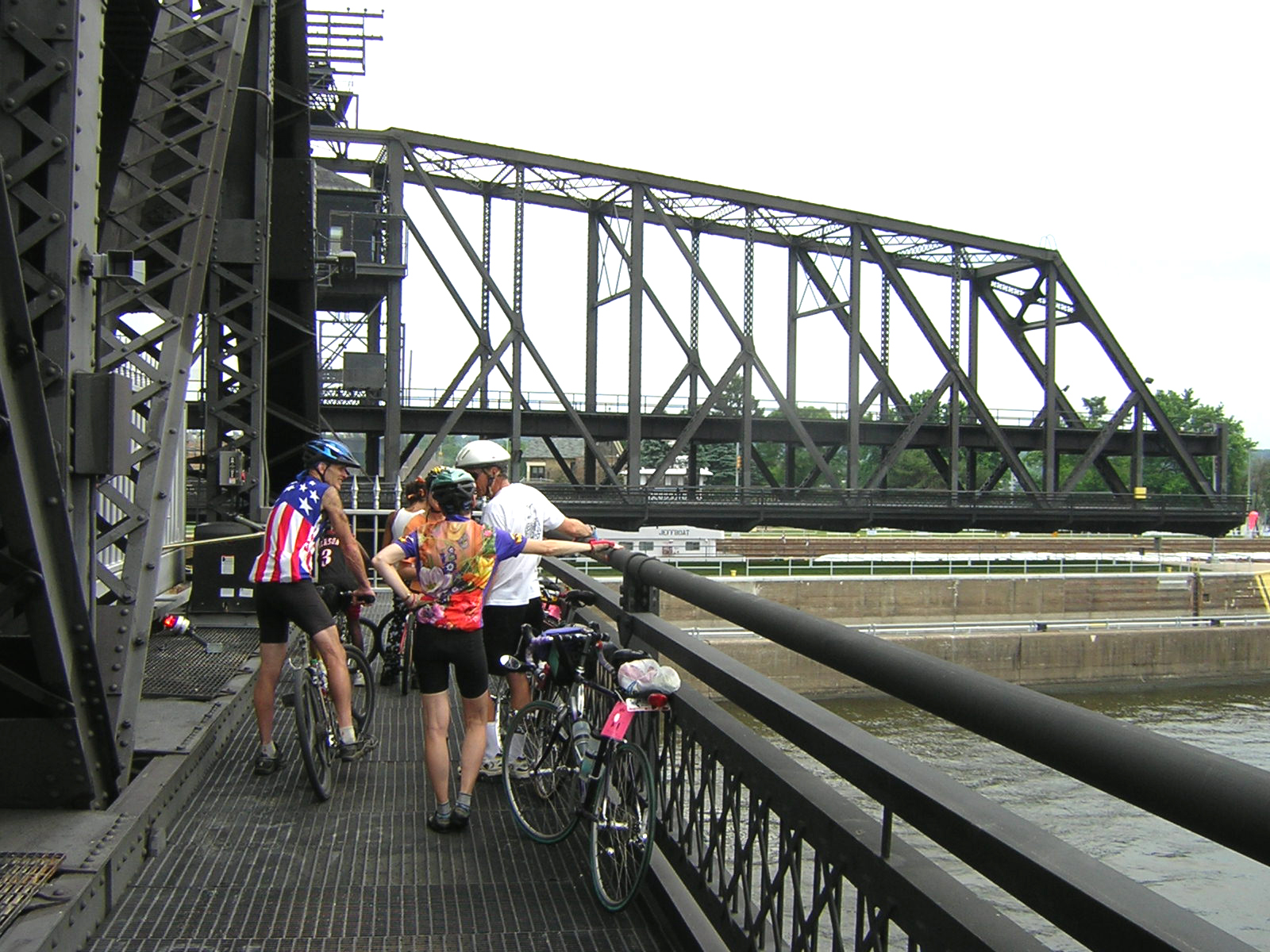
Sidewalk view during a swing-span opening

The bridge was rebuilt in 1896, as a twin double-deck bridge which carries rail (top level) and road traffic (bottom level), it has two train tracks to eliminate what had become a rail-traffic bottleneck. The bridge was designed by Ralph Modjeski and built by the Phoenix Bridge Company, and was the first bridge designed by Modjeski. On March 2, 1895, Congress authorized the War Department to build the new structure. A 2006 stress test indicated that the bridge used only "10 to 12 percent" of its service life, and was listed as part of a proposed rail trail. The height restriction of 11 feet on the lower deck means that many trucks have been damaged in an attempt to cross the bridge. It has gained the nickname "Truck-eating bridge" from the incidents reported. Another nearby bridge in Davenport also has this nickname.

In 1940, the trolley tracks were converted into extra vehicular lanes.

In 1956, a steam-powered train was brought to the Quad Cities to celebrate the 100th anniversary of the first bridge's completion. The train pulled dining cars that included dignitaries from Rock Island to Davenport.

In 1960, the bridges southwest approach was reconstructed.

On February 22, 2006 (50 years later), a dinner was held at RiverCenter to mark the 150th anniversary of the bridge. The dinner re-enacted a similar event that was held on February 22, 1854, which celebrated the completion of the Rock Island railroad.

The Quad Cities again celebrated the 150th anniversary of the bridge completion from Thursday September 14 to Sunday September 17, 2006 in a festival that included "steam locomotive excursions, riverboat rides, canoe and kayak races, a story-telling festival and a unique 'ghost bridge' display".

In 1965, the bridge closed when the Davenport approach was flooded in the record-setting Upper Mississippi flood of that year.

On May 2, 2019, the bridge and several others in the Quad Cities region were closed to all traffic due to severe flooding of the Mississippi and Rock Rivers and a levee breach in Davenport. The bridge was reopened on May 8. On July 10, 2019, the bridge closed for a day after a train derailed. The bridge and gates reopened a day after it closed.

== See also ==
- List of crossings of the Upper Mississippi River
- List of bridges documented by the Historic American Engineering Record in Illinois
- List of bridges documented by the Historic American Engineering Record in Iowa
