= Quarters 1 (Rock Island) =

Historic residential building in Illinois, United States

- Quarters 1 (Building 301)
- U.S. Historic district – Contributing property
- U.S. National Historic Landmark District – Contributing property
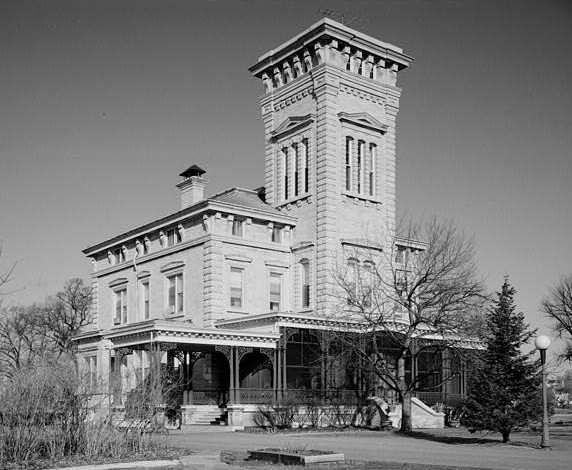
- Quarters One, Rock Island Arsenal

- Location within Illinois Location within the United States
- Location: Rock Island Arsenal
- Coordinates: 41°31′1″N 90°32′31″W
- Area: 21,965 square feet (2,040.6 m^{2})
- Built: 1870-1872
- Architect: General Thomas J. Rodman et al.
- Architectural style: Italianate
- Part of: Rock Island Arsenal (ID69000057)

Significant dates
- Designated CP: September 30, 1969
- Designated NHLDCP: June 7, 1988

Quarters One (also known as Building 301) is the former residence of the highest-ranking officer at Rock Island Arsenal in Rock Island, Illinois on the banks of the Mississippi River. At 51 rooms and 21,965 square feet (2,040.6 m^{2}), Quarters One is the second-largest federal residence in the United States, behind the White House.

== History ==
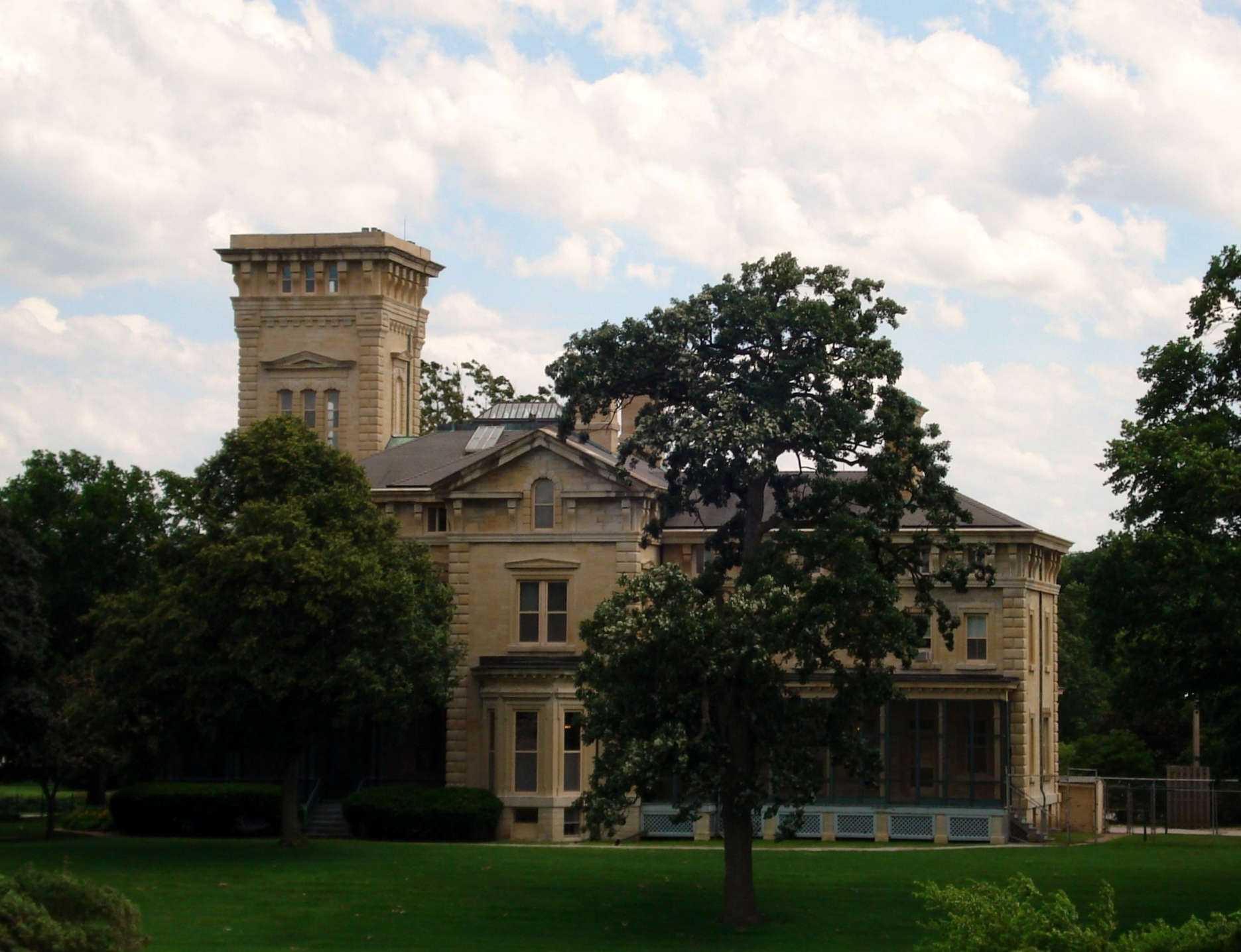
Quarters 1 as seen from the Mississippi River

Work begun on Quarters One under General Thomas S. Rodman in May 1870 and was completed in 1872 under Major Flagler. The home was built for the purpose of providing quarters for the highest-ranking officer as well as providing space for official gatherings and functions. The building was designed in the Italianate style. The first major gathering held in the residence was in 1871 for the funeral of General Rodman. Over the years, many dignitaries and notable personalities stayed at the residence including Charles Lindbergh in 1927 and King Carl XVI Gustav and Queen Silvia of Sweden in 1996. In 2006, the Army decided to discontinue its use as a residence. The last occupants, Maj. Gen and Mrs. Robert M. Radin, left in 2008. Tours are offered occasionally, and the building is available to rent for weddings, bridal parties, and other social and ceremonial events. In 2011, it was estimated that at least $6 million in work was needed.
