= Frank P. Witek =

World War II Medal of Honor Recipient

Frank Peter Witek
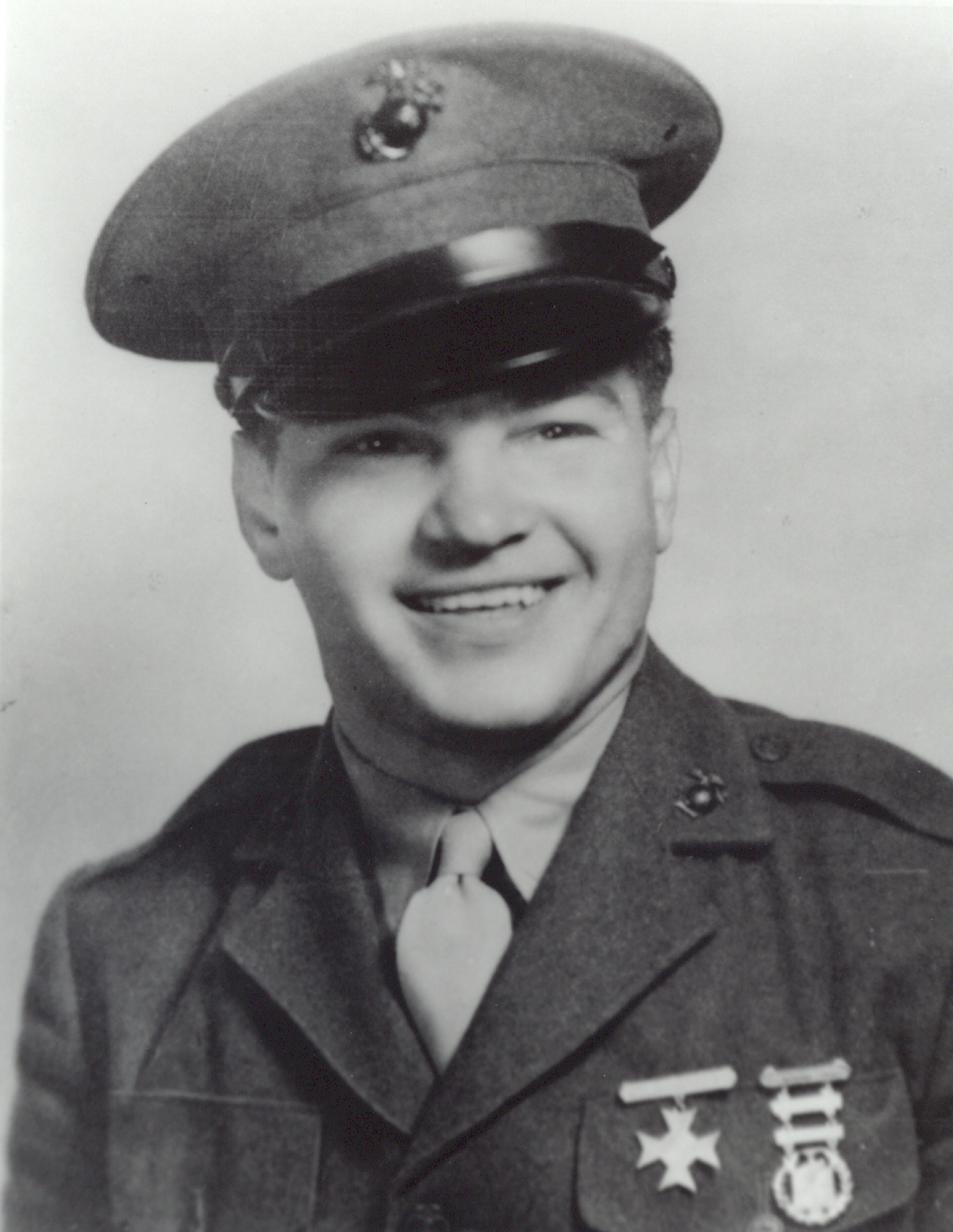
- Frank P. Witek, Medal of Honor recipient
- Born: December 10, 1921; Derby, Connecticut
- Died: August 3, 1944 (aged 22); Guam, Mariana Islands
- Burial place: Rock Island National Cemetery; Rock Island, Illinois
- Military career
- Allegiance: United States of America
- Branch: United States Marine Corps
- Service years: 1942–1944
- Rank: Private First Class
- Units: 1st Battalion, 9th Marines
- Conflicts: World War II: Battle of Guam †
- Awards: Medal of Honor; Purple Heart

Private First Class Frank Peter Witek (December 10, 1921 – August 3, 1944) was a United States Marine who was killed in action on August 3, 1944, in the Battle of Finegayan, Guam. For his heroism and sacrifice of life, he was posthumously awarded the Medal of Honor. He was the 28th Marine to receive the Medal of Honor during World War II.

== Biography ==
Frank Peter Witek was born on December 10, 1921, in Derby, Connecticut. He was of Polish ancestry. When he was 9, the family moved to Chicago. It was there he finished his student days at Crane Technical High School and went to work at the Standard Transformer Company.

On January 20, 1942, he left for recruit training after enlisting in the United States Marine Corps. He left almost immediately for Pearl Harbor and in January 1943, his family heard from him while he was in New Zealand. From there he went to Bougainville where he fought in three major battles. Then he went to Guadalcanal for a rest. On July 21, 1944, the 3rd Marine Division invaded Guam. PFC Witek was a Browning automatic rifleman and scout behind the Japanese lines.

On September 8, 1944, his mother received a telegram from Washington informing her that her son had been killed on August 3. According to a combat correspondent's release, he was slain at the battle of the Mount Santa Rosa roadblock. He had only eight cartridges left out of an original 240 rounds when he was found.

On Sunday, May 20, 1945, 50,000 people, including his mother and Gen Alexander A. Vandegrift, Commandant of the Marine Corps, met in Soldier Field, Chicago, to do honor to his memory. PFC Frank Peter Witek had earned the highest military award his country could give him — the Medal of Honor.

Initially buried in the Army, Navy, and Marine Corps Cemetery on Guam, PFC Witek's remains were reinterred in the Rock Island National Cemetery, Rock Island, Illinois, in 1949.

== Medal of Honor citation ==
The President of the United States takes pride in presenting the MEDAL OF HONOR posthumously to

PRIVATE FIRST CLASS FRANK P. WITEK
UNITED STATES MARINE CORPS RESERVE

for service as set forth in the following CITATION:

For conspicuous gallantry and intrepidity at the risk of his life above and beyond the call of duty while serving with the First Battalion, Ninth Marines, Third Marine Division, during the Battle of Finegayan at Guam, Marianas, on 3 August 1944. When his rifle platoon was halted by heavy surprise fire from well camouflaged enemy positions, Private First Class Witek daringly remained standing to fire a full magazine from his automatic point-blank range into a depression housing Japanese troops, killing eight of the enemy and enabling the greater part of his platoon to take cover. During his platoon's withdrawal for consolidation of lines, he remained to safeguard a severely wounded comrade, courageously returning the enemy's fire until the arrival of stretcher bearers and then covering the evacuation by sustained fire as he moved backward toward his own lines. With his platoon again pinned down by a hostile machine-gun, Private First Class Witek, on his own initiative, moved forward boldly ahead of the reinforcing tanks and infantry, alternately throwing hand grenades and firing as he advanced to within five to ten yards of the enemy position, destroying the hostile machine-gun emplacement and an additional eight Japanese before he, himself, was struck down by an enemy rifleman. His valiant and inspiring action effectively reduced the enemy's firepower, thereby enabling his platoon to attain its objective, and reflects the highest credit upon Private First Class Witek and the United States Naval Service. He gallantly gave his life for his country.

/S/ FRANKLIN D. ROOSEVELT

== Honors ==
- In 1946, a Gearing-class destroyer, the USS Witek (DD-848) was named in honor of PFC Witek. The destroyer was launched on February 2, 1946, and was christened by Witek's mother, Mrs. Nora Witek. The USS Witek was commissioned on April 25, 1946. It was formally decommissioned on August 19, 1968.
- In 1999, Witek's hometown, Derby, Connecticut has named the PFC Frank P. Witek Memorial Park in his honor.
- The Marine Corps Scholarship Foundation awards a memorial scholarship in honor of PFC Frank Witek.
- The area near the village of Yona on Guam, was named Marine Camp Witek. Although the camp closed decades ago, Guam natives still refer to the area as "Camp Witek".

== See also ==
- List of Medal of Honor recipients
