= Rock Island National Cemetery =

Veterans cemetery in Rock Island County, Illinois

- U.S. National Register of Historic Places
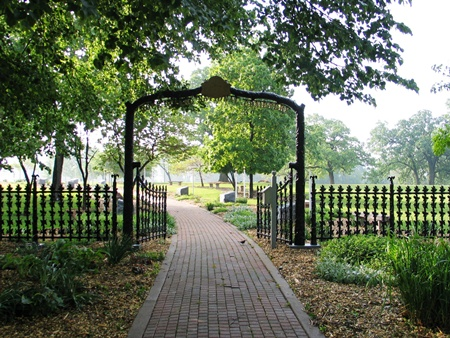
- Historic gate and memorial walkway

- Location within Illinois Location within the United States
- Location: 0.25 mi N of southern tip of Rock Island
- Nearest city: Moline, Illinois
- Coordinates: 41°30′48″N 90°31′27″W
- Area: 66 acres (27 ha)
- Built: 1863
- MPS: Civil War Era National Cemeteries MPS
- NRHP reference No.: 97000560
- Added to NRHP: June 13, 1997

Rock Island National Cemetery is a United States National Cemetery located within Rock Island Arsenal near the city of Rock Island, Illinois. Administered by the United States Department of Veterans Affairs, it encompasses 66 acres (27 ha), and as of the end of 2006, had 24,525 interments. The cemetery is also nearing compliance with the National Shrine guidelines, due to its use of college students during the summer to reset and realign stones. When looking from any one stone there should be seven lines visible and all should be straight.

== History ==
The cemetery was established in 1863 as a place to inter the remains of American Civil War Union army soldiers. Its initial placement interfered with the expansion of the Arsenal's facilities, so it was moved to a location on the northern end of the island. Civil War veterans who were interred in Oakdale Cemetery in Davenport, Iowa, were later disinterred and moved to the National Cemetery. Property transfers from the Arsenal in 1926, 1936, and 1950 increased the cemetery's area. There are plans for further expansion of this cemetery including an additional pavilion, more land, and a wall for cremations near the tank track.

A second, 2-acre (0.81 ha) cemetery was established near Rock Island National Cemetery to bury Confederate prisoners of war, nearly two thousand of which would die while in captivity on the island, primarily from the harsh living conditions.

== Notable interments ==
=== Medal of Honor recipients ===
- Private First Class Edward J. Moskala (1921–1945), United States Army Medal of Honor recipient for action in World War II
- Private First Class Frank P. Witek (1921–1944), United States Marine Corps Medal of Honor recipient for action in World War II

=== Other burials ===
- Gene Baker (1925–1999), Major League Baseball player, coach, and scout
- Lane Evans (1951–2014), Congressman, Illinois's 17th congressional district
- Jeff Pfeffer (1888–1972), Major League Baseball player from 1911 to 1924
- Brevet Brigadier General Thomas Jackson Rodman (1816–1871), commander at the Rock Island Arsenal and developer of the Rodman gun
- Ralph Ignatowski (1926–1945), Rifleman, Battle of Iwo Jima
