= Thomas Jackson Rodman =

American soldier and inventor (1816–1871)

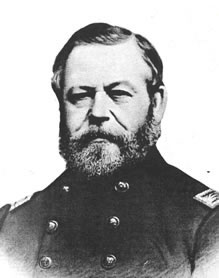
- Thomas Jackson Rodman
- Born: July 31, 1816; Salem, Indiana, U.S.
- Died: June 7, 1871 (aged 54); Rock Island, Illinois, U.S.
- Burial place: Rock Island National Cemetery in Illinois
- Military career
- Allegiance: United States; Union
- Branch: United States Army; Union Army
- Service years: 1841–1871
- Rank: Lieutenant Colonel; Bvt. Brigadier General
- Commands: Watertown Arsenal; Rock Island Arsenal
- Conflicts: Mexican–American War; American Civil War
- Other work: inventor

Thomas Jackson Rodman (July 31, 1816 – June 7, 1871) was an American artillerist, inventor, ordnance specialist, and career United States Army officer. He served as a Union Army officer during the American Civil War, in which he was noted for his many improvements and innovations concerning the artillery used by the Union forces.

He is especially remembered for developing the Rodman gun, which in various sizes saw extensive use in coastal defenses, and was called the "strongest cast iron cannon ever made." General Rodman also discovered the use of shaped gunpowder grains, in which properly compressing and shaping the gunpowder into pre-designed grain shapes allowed the control of gas production by the burning gunpowder. This resulted in increased muzzle velocities with lower maximum pressures when compared to performance with conventional ball powder. The Rodman seven perforation grain was named after Rodman, and similar propellant grain shapes are still in use today in artillery, rockets, and automotive airbag inflators. After the conflict Rodman remained with the U.S. Army in his chosen profession, and is also noted for his alleged controversies while in command of the Watertown Arsenal.

== Early life and career ==
Thomas Jackson Rodman was born in 1816 on a farm near Salem in Washington County, Indiana. He was a son of James Rodman and his wife Elizabeth Burton, who was originally from Virginia. In 1837 Rodman entered the United States Military Academy in West Point, and graduated four years later, standing seventh out of 52 cadets. On July 1, 1841, he was appointed a brevet second lieutenant in the U.S. Army Ordnance Department.

On December 13, 1843, Rodman married Martha Ann Black (1823–1908), and the couple would have seven children together. His two daughters were named Florence (born 1849) and Ella Elizabeth (born 1856), and his sons were named: John B. (1844–1909), Edmund B. (born 1846), Thomas Jackson Jr. (1852–1919), Robert S. (born 1855), and Addison B. (born 1858.)

Two of Rodman's sons also attended West Point. Addison Burton Rodman was admitted on July 1, 1877, but resigned on December 18 that same year. John Black Rodman was admitted on September 1, 1863, graduated on June 15, 1868, served initially with the 20th U.S. Infantry, and rose to the rank of colonel before retiring.

Rodman also saw limited military action in 1846–48 during the Mexican–American War.

== The Rodman gun and Civil War service ==
Starting in 1844, Rodman performed experiments to overcome the size limitations of casting cast iron cannon. At that time, all cannon barrels made of iron were cast solid and then cooled on the outside. This resulted in uneven cooling when the metal contracted toward the barrel's outer surface. This process also "created internal strains and structural irregularities", and these problems were even more prevalent in large bore castings, especially on any actual openings in the cannon that were designed. Cannons made this way could crack during the cooling process, break apart during transport, or worse, burst when fired. After many years of work, Rodman developed a way to avoid this problem. He found that if he cast the iron around a hollow core and then applied a steady stream of water within the barrel for cooling, a much more reliable and stronger product was made. His method, and the result, has been described as: "Water circulating through the tube cooled the bore while coals were piled against the mold to keep the outer surface hot. Rodman's manufacturing method, now known as the 'wet chill process', forced the impurities outward while the outer metal shrank against the hardened interior." Doing this forced the thickest material toward the center of the barrel. Rodman patented this invention.

A comparison of the Rodman 7-perf grain with an equal amount of ball powder shows even burn which results in better performance with less stress on the gun.

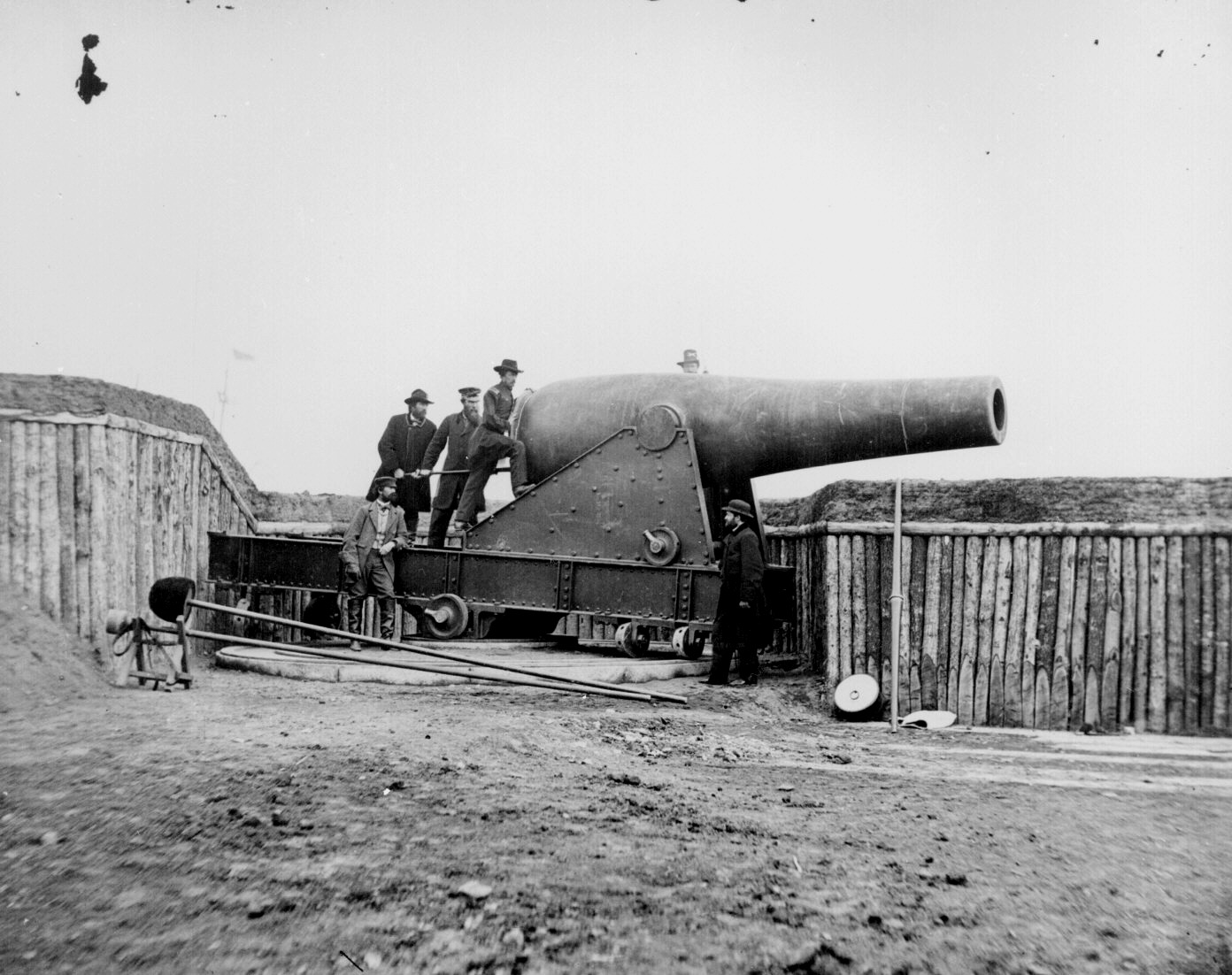
An example of a 15-inch Rodman gun during the American Civil War. This one was part of Battery Rodgers protecting Washington, D.C.

On March 3, 1847, Rodman was promoted to first lieutenant, and was promoted to the rank of captain on July 1, 1855. Rodman experimented for almost a decade at the Fort Pitt Foundry in Pittsburgh, Pennsylvania, testing his theory and performing trial runs of his cannon barrels. After viewing the results, the US War Department approved construction of a 15-inch smoothbore columbiad of Rodman's design in 1859. On December 23 a prototype was cast, and it test fired 509 times without incident. The following year he supervised its construction at the foundry, and once complete it was shipped for testing to Fortress Monroe at Old Point Comfort on the Virginia Peninsula. It tested successfully there in March 1861, but due to its size and weight it would be destined for permanent, fixed positions, and not suitable for field service nor naval use. The specifications of this gun were: overall length of 15 feet, 10 inches long; bore length of 13 feet, 9 inches; total weight around 50,000 pounds. This design, capable of firing either shell or shot, would be the base for most of the Rodman guns that followed.

Rodman also addressed the effectiveness of the gunpowder used in cannons. During 1856, his experiments showed that compressing powder into hexagonal-shaped grains with several holes cut into them lengthwise caused the grains to burn outside as well as in, unlike their predecessors. This resulted in a longer and more consistent burn time in the bore, increasing the muzzle velocity of the round fired, thereby increasing the range of the weapon. As a result of his work, on April 17, 1861, Rodman reported to the U.S. War Department that he could now produce reliable cannon in almost any size using the methods he had developed. In November 1861 the first U.S. Government order was made for Rodman's fifteen-inch cannon, "...the largest in the U.S. arsenal." During the conflict around 130 fifteen-inch, 445 ten-inch, and 213 eight-inch Rodman guns were purchased by the U.S. government, and an unknown number made after the conflict.

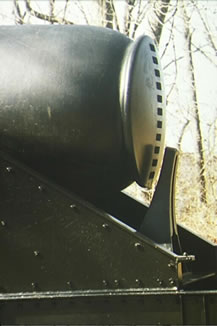
The distinctive rear knob of a 15-inch Rodman gun

Another innovation Rodman developed was a replacement for the rear knob of a cannon (called the cascabel) which is used for fitting the gear that lifted and lowered the gun. Older designs had small round knobs, which were found to break easily on the larger barrels being cast at the Fort Pitt Foundry. Rodman gave his cannon a short knob nearly as wide as the base of the barrel, a distinctive and easily recognizable feature of Rodman's guns. He also created instruments capable of measuring the internal pressure of his cannons. Rodman's contributions and the extent his work was utilized had been described as:

He invented the "wet chill", hollow-core system of cannon founding, which resulted in the strongest cast iron cannon ever made. He also invented prismatic and perforated-cake gunpowder, which allowed more consistent ignition in large cannon. His 15-inch guns were the primary Union coast defense weapons not only during the Civil War, but throughout the last half of the 19th century.

Throughout the American Civil War, Rodman was commander and superintendent of the Watertown Arsenal, located along the Charles River in Watertown, Massachusetts. He also served on the army's Fortification Board during the war, and on June 1, 1863, Rodman was promoted to the rank of major. He spent about three years designing a 20-inch cannon (the largest he would create) and the work finally began on February 11, 1864. Using several of the arsenal's furnaces, about 160,000 pounds of molten iron were cast into four separate molds, then a week of cooling followed, and the cannon was finished on a huge lathe specially built for this task. A railroad flatcar capable of holding the gun, and its large carriage weighing 36,000 pounds itself, were also made under Rodman's supervision at the arsenal. While awaiting shipment to Fort Hamilton in New York Harbor, the large cannon drew spectators. On July 23, 1864, the Pittsburgh Gazette newspaper reported "Juveniles, aged from ten to fifteen years, were amusing themselves today in crawling into the bore on their hands and knees. A good sized family including ma and pa, could find shelter in the gun and it would be a capital place to hide in case of a bombardment..."

As the American Civil War ended in 1865, Rodman was rewarded for his service with three brevet promotions in the U.S. Army, all occurring on March 13, making him a brevet brigadier general.

== Later career, controversy, and death ==
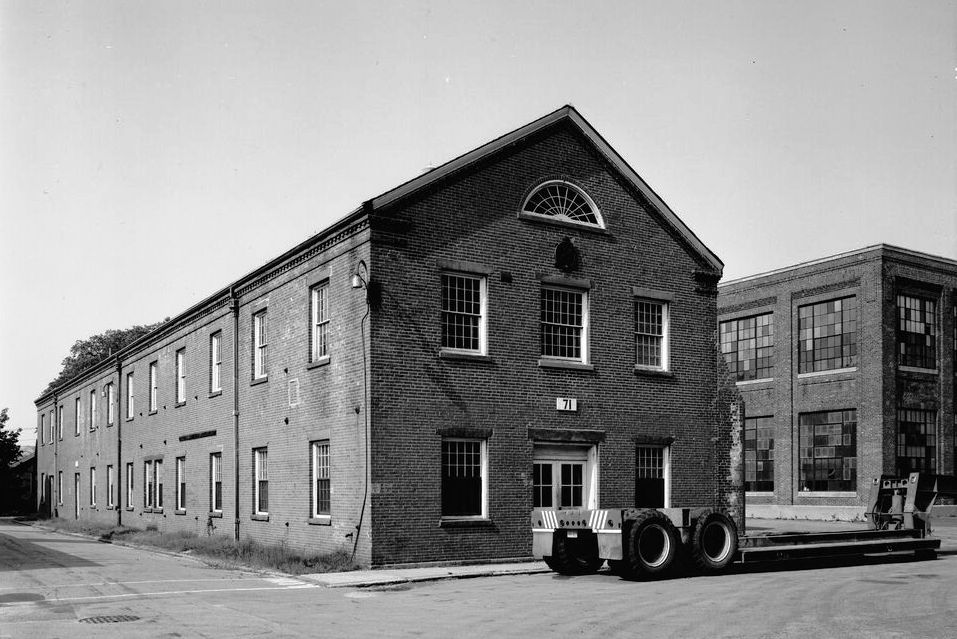
Watertown Arsenal's Building #71, circa 1969

After the war ended, Rodman chose to remain in the U.S. Army. His actions while in command of the Watertown Arsenal drew the attention of the powerful Congressional Committee on the Conduct of the War, who investigated allegations of Rodman's possible disloyalty, improper management of the facility, and misuse of government resources, among other items. In particular he was charged with the following:

... neglected to join officially in the observance of expression of joy at the surrender of the rebel General Lee, and of the sorrow at the death of President Lincoln. He was also accused of employing disloyal men; of interfering with the right to petition by refusing to allow female employees to circulate a petition in the laboratory and afterwards discharging 19 of them for doing so; of retaining an employee who had twice been found under the influence of liquor; of employing 57 foreigners (thought to be less loyal) out of 98 enlisted men; and of excessive spending in the building of the new commanding officer's quarters.

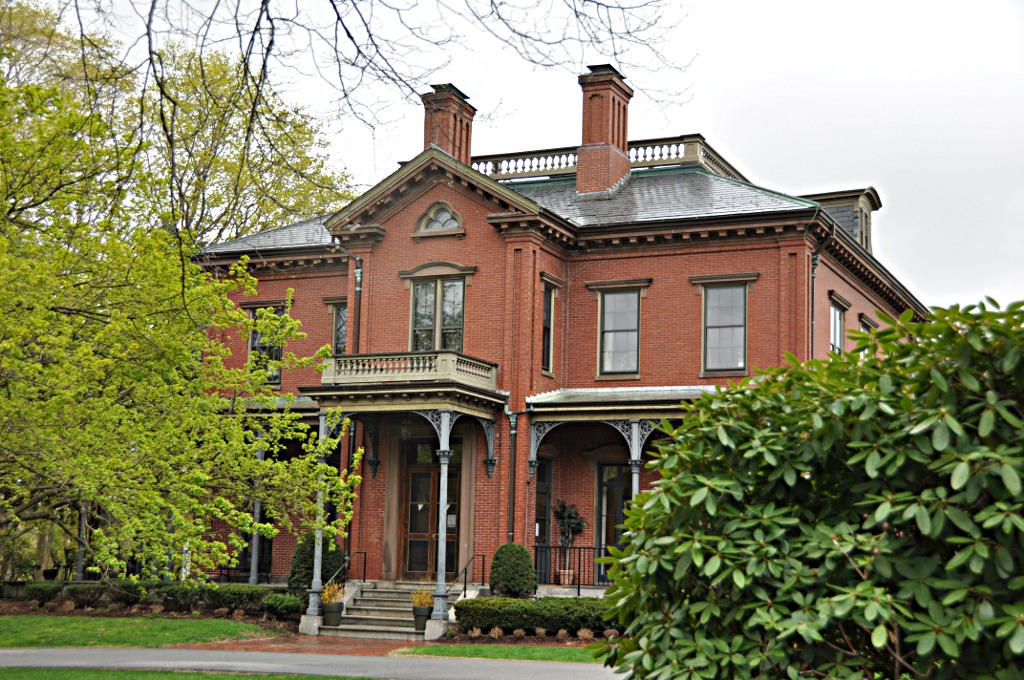
Watertown Arsenal's Commanding Officer's Quarters

Almost 100 witnesses were called to testify before the Committee on this matter, however, Rodman was not permitted to cross-examine any of them; instead he was only allowed to refute these charges in a letter to his own commander, Brig. Gen. Alexander B. Dyer, the army's Chief of Ordnance. To the accusations concerning his personal loyalty, Rodman answered: "that he had given much attention to the loyalty of his men, and he showed his vigilance in pointing out that there had been no accidents at the Arsenal during his tenure there." To the charge he failed to properly celebrate the Union victory and mourn Lincoln, he stated: "that he had not fired a salute in recognition of the end of the war and of the President's death because he had never received official orders to do so." The issue investigated most heavily by the Committee, however, concerned the building of the post commander's residence at the Watertown Arsenal. Speculation and rumor as to its total cost ranged up to $100,000 to $150,000 USD, and that such extravagance was only to benefit Rodman himself. To the second claim Rodman stated that he had received orders to construct the residence (along with specifications and plans for it) by his superiors in the Ordnance Department, but the first claim required further testimony. Rodman stated that "every economy possible was being observed in constructing the house" and other witnesses testified that the cost (estimated to be between $40,000 and $60,000) was reasonable for its completion; the final total would come to $63,478.65.

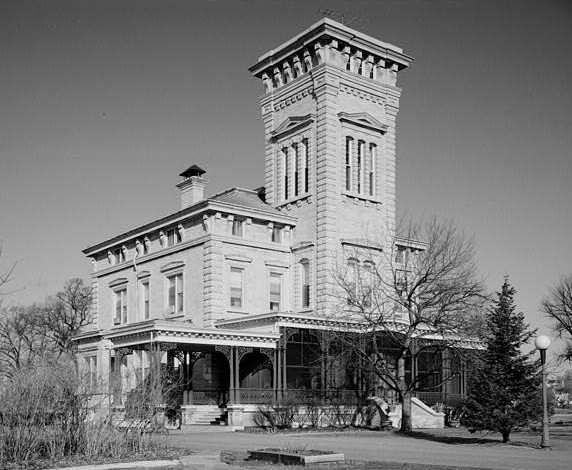
Rock Island Arsenal's Building #1, circa 1985

The investigation itself developed its own controversy. Believing the Committee was hearing only "one-sided testimony" the civilians of Watertown wrote affidavits praising Rodman's performance, asking he remain commander of the arsenal, and demanding he receive a fair trial. The hearings were described as "More than 90 witnesses were examined by Honorable Mr. Gooch of the Congressional Committee, who appears to have carefully selected for testimony those persons who advocated Rodman's removal; and to have asked leading questions to any witnesses who may have been in sympathy with the commanding officer." Although the investigation was completed, the results of the charges against him were never revealed, and in July 1865 Rodman was sent to Rock Island, Illinois, to supervise the construction of a new arsenal. This facility would become the Rock Island Arsenal, where Rodman would spend the rest of his life and career, as well as building an even larger commander's residence.

On March 7, 1867, Rodman was promoted to the permanent rank of lieutenant colonel in the U.S. Army. He died on duty at Rock Island on June 7, 1871, and was buried on June 17 in the arsenal's National Cemetery.

Reflecting a pattern of naming many Washington, DC streets in newly developed areas in the Capital after Civil War generals, an east–west street in the Northwest quadrant is named Rodman Street, NW.
