= Rock Island Arsenal =

Military production site in Illinois, United States

- Rock Island Arsenal, Rock Island Township / Moline Township, Rock Island County, Illinois

Site information
- Type: Army post
- Controlled by: U.S. Army
- Website: www.army.mil/ria

Site history
- Built: 1862
- In use: 1862–present

Garrison information
- Garrison: Joint Manufacturing and Technology Center; U.S. Army Corps of Engineers, Rock Island District; United States Army Sustainment Command; First United States Army

- Rock Island Arsenal
- U.S. National Register of Historic Places
- U.S. National Historic Landmark District
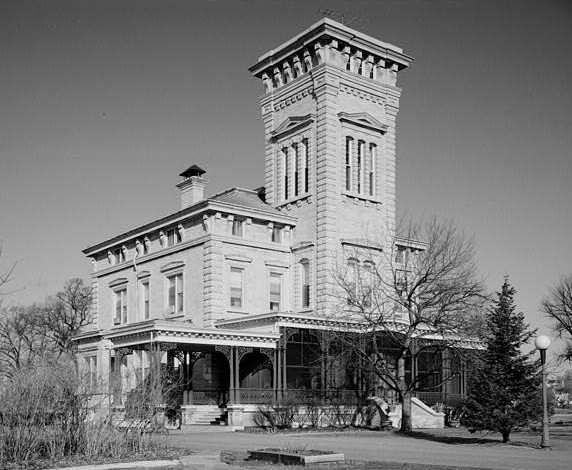
- Rock Island Arsenal, Quarters 1 (Building 301)

- Location within Illinois Location within the United States
- Location: Rock Island, Illinois
- Coordinates: 41°31′1″N 90°32′31″W
- Built: 1832
- Architect: General Thomas J. Rodman et al.
- Architectural style: Greek Revival, Italianate
- NRHP reference No.: 69000057

Significant dates
- Added to NRHP: September 30, 1969
- Designated NHLD: June 7, 1988

Rock Island Military Prison
- Part of American Civil War prison camps
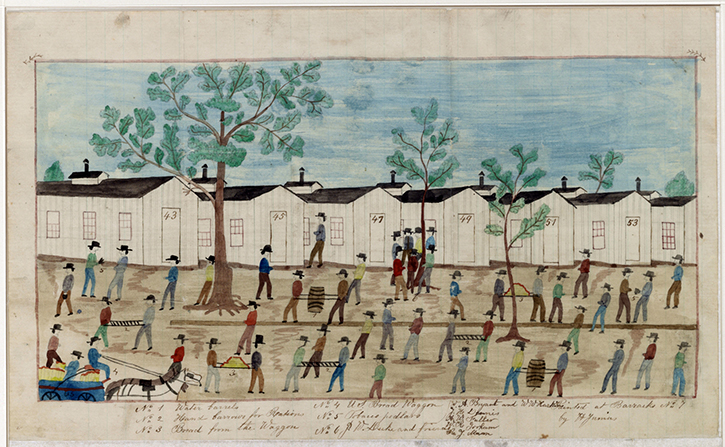
- Union prison at Rock Island, during the American Civil War, circa 1863–1865

Site information
- Type: Union Prison Camp
- Owner: U.S. Government
- Controlled by: Union Army
- Open to the public: No

Site history
- In use: December 1863-July 1865
- Battles/wars: American Civil War

Garrison information
- Occupants: Union soldiers, Confederate prisoners of war

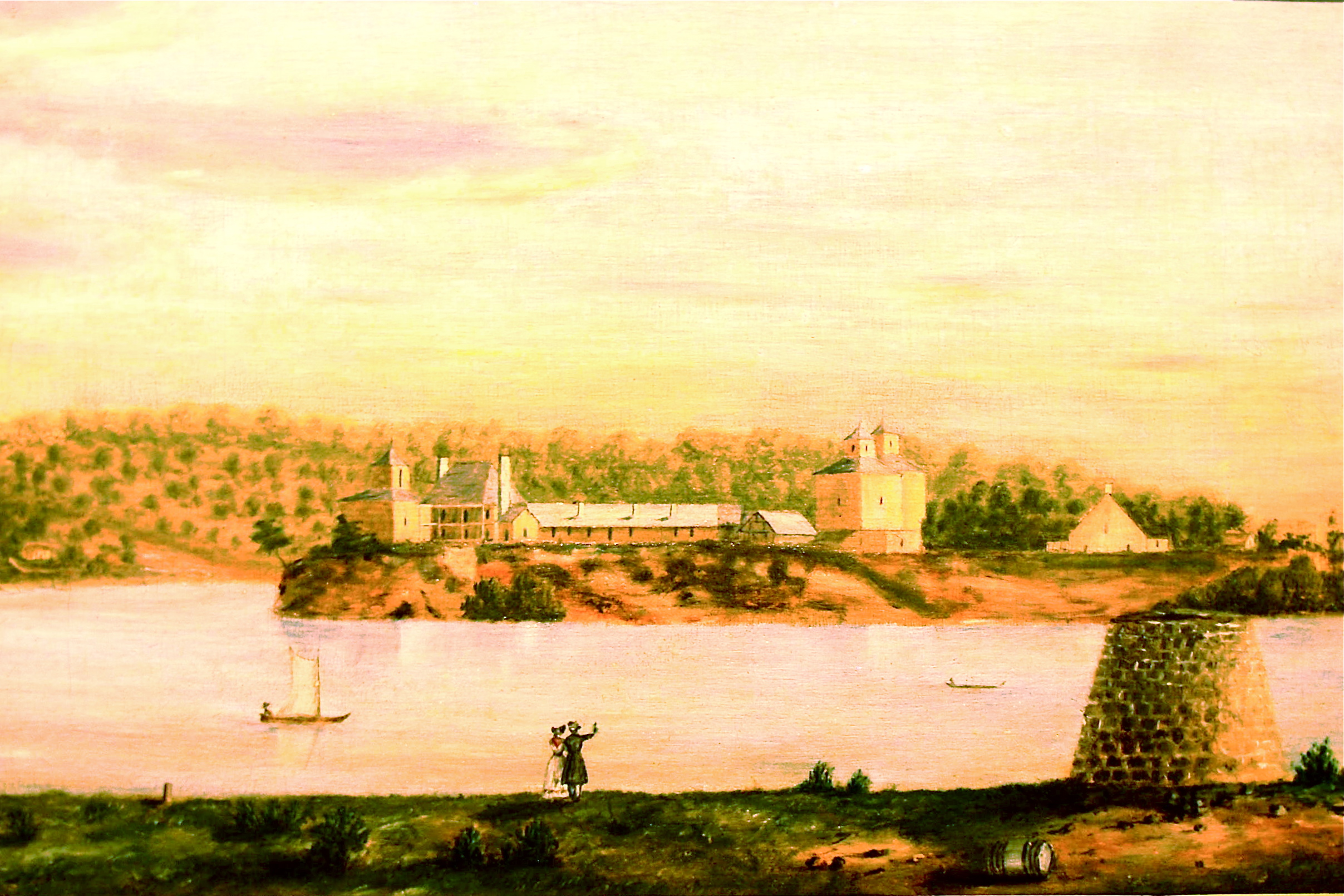
Rock Island in the pre-arsenal years, following the Black Hawk War of 1832, with a view of the U.S. Army post Fort Armstrong, circa 1839

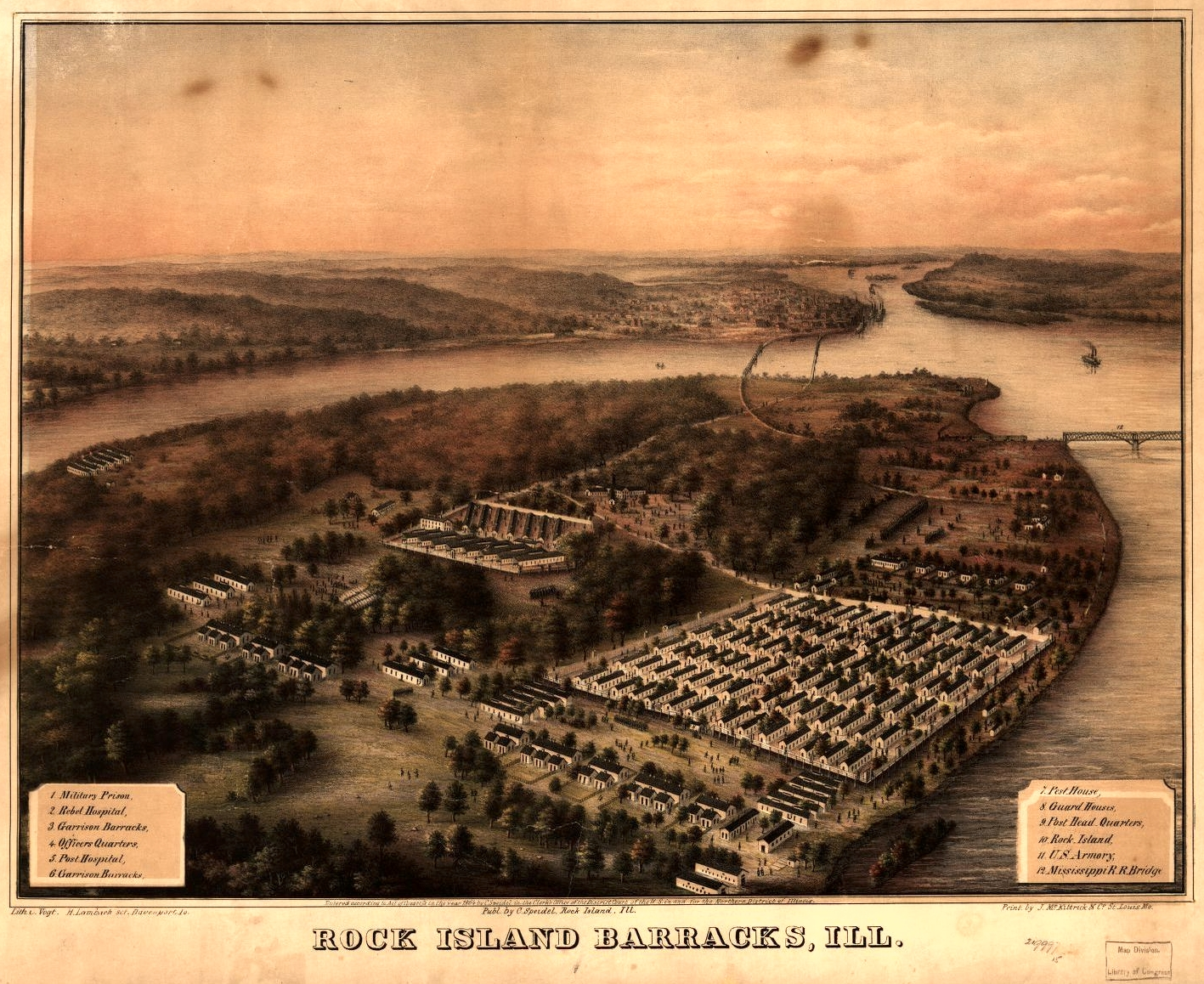
Perspective drawing of the prison for Confederate soldiers at Rock Island, 1864

The Rock Island Arsenal comprises 946 acres (383 ha) located on Arsenal Island, originally known as Rock Island, on the Mississippi River between the cities of Davenport, Iowa, and Rock Island, Illinois. It is home to the United States Army First Army Headquarters, and the United States Army Center of Excellence for Additive Manufacturing.

Historically, the indigenous Sauk people used Rock Island as their summer camp site. Encroaching European Americans coming into the area disputed the claim of tribal ownership, and competition between the peoples led to the Black Hawk War of 1832, named for Black Hawk, the primary leader of the Sauk. In 1816, the federal government authorized the army to build Fort Armstrong here, to protect shipping on the river in the aftermath of the War of 1812 with Great Britain. Decades after the Civil War, in the 1880s, the army established a foundry and armory here, manufacturing both military equipment and ordnance. In 1919–1920, one hundred of the Anglo-American or Liberty Mark VIII tanks were manufactured there, although too late for World War I. The base is now the largest government-owned weapons manufacturing arsenal in the United States. In 1988, the Arsenal was designated a National Historic Landmark.

At the turn of the 20th century, it manufactured both ordnance and leather accoutrements and field gear, for an army that still relied on horses for transportation and cavalry. Today, it provides manufacturing, logistics, and base support services for the United States Armed Forces. The Arsenal is the only active U.S. Army foundry, and manufactures ordnance and equipment, including artillery, gun mounts, recoil mechanisms, small arms, aircraft weapons sub-systems, grenade launchers, weapons simulators, and a host of associated components. Some of the Arsenal's most successful products include the M198 and M119 towed howitzers, and the gun mount for the M1 Abrams, main battle tank for the Army since the 1980s. About 250 military personnel and 6,000 civilians are employed there. The population from the 2020 census was 182 people.

== History ==
From 1816-1862, the site was known as Fort Armstrong. Before that, successive cultures of Native Americans had occupied it for thousands of years because of its strategic position along the Mississippi River. The United States took control of the island in 1804 through the Harrison Peace Treaty with the Chief of the Fox and Sac Tribes. From 1804 to 1812, the US Army did not occupy the island. It was the scene of a small conflict at the outbreak of the War of 1812 with Great Britain. Following that war, in 1814, it was the site of a U.S. Army expedition from St Louis to use the island as a guard post to control traffic on the Mississippi and maintain watch over the local Native Americans.

Black Hawk wrote in his memoir: "When we arrived we found that the troops had come to build a fort on Rock Island...We did not object, however, to their building their fort on the island, but were very sorry, as this was the best one on the Mississippi, and had long been the resort of our young people during the summer. It was our garden, like the white people have near their big villages, which supplied us with strawberries, blackberries, gooseberries, plums, apples and nuts of different kinds."

During the Civil War, the army converted some facilities and built more in 1863; these were not yet completed in December of that year, when the first Confederate prisoners of war were incarcerated there. The construction was makeshift. The first prisoners were 468 Confederates captured in battles at Chattanooga, Tennessee. That month more than 5,000 Confederates would swell the population of Rock Island military prison. They were kept in 84 barracks, each holding around 100 prisoners. A total of 41 Confederate prisoners successfully escaped during the prison's operation, and many more would try but fail. They were deterred by the power of the Mississippi River.

A total of 1,964 Confederate prisoners and 125 Union guards are buried in the adjacent military cemetery. The Union guard burials included 49 African-American members of the 108th Colored Infantry, who had served as guards. Most of the men died from disease, since sanitation was primitive, as in all army encampments. In addition, they were exposed to high heat and humidity during the summers and freezing temperatures during winters. In 1864, deadly smallpox epidemics rapidly spread through the prison. The prison camp operated from December 1863 until July 1865, when the last prisoners were freed. After the war, the prison facility was completely destroyed. During its two years in operation, the prison camp housed a total of more than 12,400 Confederates.

Other historical sites in the area include the Confederate Cemetery, the Rock Island National Cemetery, 19th-century stone workshops, officers' quarters along the river, Col. Davenport's House, and the site of the first railroad bridge built across the Mississippi.

Following the war, the federal government retained ownership of Arsenal Island. It developed the property for use as an arsenal and ordnance manufacturing center, which led to the island being renamed.

== Women's history ==
During the First World War, demand for war materials drastically increased; this increased the demand for skilled labor, but many men were drafted for the war. Women were hired to fill job vacancies at the arsenal. This is often referred to as the "women draft", as they had to backfill the men leaving to fight in order to keep satisfying the war demands from factory production. Rock Island Arsenal increased from having 175 female employees in 1914 to 300 in 1917, a dramatic change before women’s suffrage was approved. Women were absolutely critical to the success of the US buildup in World War I, and played an integral role in production at Rock Island Arsenal.

== Early historical timeline ==
- 1809: Declared a federal military reservation by an Act of Congress
- 1816: Fort Armstrong built on the island
- 1818: George Davenport, U.S. Army sutler established trading post
- 1832: Served as U.S. Army HQ for Blackhawk War
- 1833: George Davenport mansion built
- 1836: Abandoned, but remained ordnance depot
- 1845: George Davenport killed by Banditti of the Prairie
- 1856: First railroad built across the Mississippi River
- 1862: Rock Island Arsenal (the name we know it to be today) established by an Act of Congress
- 1862: First Commanding Officer of Rock Island Major Charles P. Kingsbury
- 1863-1865: Rock Island Prison Barracks built to house Confederate soldiers
- 1865: Second Commanding Officer of Rock Island Arsenal, Brevet Brigadier General Thomas J. Rodman, also known as the Father of Rock Island Arsenal for his contributions
- 1867: Clock Tower Building erected; it survives and is used as the offices of the U.S. Army Corps of Engineers
- 1871: First military quarters built on Rock Island, an Italianate-style villa known as Quarters One. At 20,000 square feet, it is one of the largest government single-family residences in the United States
- 1872: First Government bridge built across the Mississippi River; replaced the railroad bridge destroyed by a steamboat

== Rock Island Arsenal Museum ==
The Rock Island Arsenal Museum was established on July 4, 1905. It is the second-oldest US Army Museum in the US after the West Point Museum. The museum has been closed twice, during World War I and World War II, to provide more space for manufacturing facilities.

Exhibits interpret the history of Rock Island Arsenal, the Union prison camp during the American Civil War, and the site's role as a military industrial facility. The museum contains the second-largest collection of small arms weapons in the U.S. Army, and an outdoor vehicle display.

Exhibits include (as of 2012)
Weapon	Country of origin	Period
M1 75 mm Pack Howitzer	United States	1927–present
M40A1 106 mm Recoilless Rifle	United States	1950s–present
M45 Quadmount 50 caliber machine gun turret	United States	World War II – 1980s
M14 conversion display to M14 Enhanced Battle Rifle (RI)	United States	1959–present
M65 Atomic Cannon	United States	1953–1963
M198 155 mm towed howitzer	United States	1979–present
M119 105 mm towed howitzer	United Kingdom; United States	1989–present
M115 8-inch towed howitzer	United States	1931–1950s
Type 59-1 130 mm Field Gun (Chinese version of Russian M46)	China	1954–present
M22 or T9E1 Locust Light Tank	United States	World War II
M4A3 Sherman Medium Tank with battle damage from the Battle of the Bulge in World War II with the 4th Armored Division	United States	World War II
M50 Ontos self-propelled anti-tank gun	United States	1956–1969
M51 Skysweeper towed anti-aircraft gun	United States	1953–1975
M1 Bofors 40 mm anti-aircraft gun	Sweden	World War II
D-44 85 mm Field Gun	Soviet Union	1945–1953
M2A1 105 mm howitzer	United States	1941–present
XM123A1 Medium Auxiliary Propelled 155mm Howitzer (experimental model of M114 howitzer)	United States	1961
XM124E2 Light Auxiliary Propelled 105 mm howitzer (experimental model of M2 or M101 howitzer)	United States	1962–1965
M114 155 mm howitzer	United States	1942–present
M2A2 Terra Star Auxiliary Propelled Howitzer with tri-star wheels	United States	1969–1977
15 cm Nebelwerfer 41 Multiple Rocket Launcher	Germany	World War II
XM70E2 Rocket Launcher	United States	1959–1963
M5 3 inch anti-tank gun	United States	1943–present
M102 Lightweight 105 mm howitzer (Airmobile)	United States	1964–present
T66 or M16 4.5-inch Multiple Rocket Launcher	United States	1945–1954
M3A1 37 mm Anti-tank Gun	United States	World War II
M1 57 mm Anti-tank Gun	United Kingdom	World War II
M3 105 mm light howitzer (airborne)	United States	1943–present
M55 self-propelled howitzer	United States	1970s
MGR-1 Honest John surface-to-surface missile	United States	1954–1973
MGR-3 Little John surface-to-surface missile with XM80 launcher	United States	1961–1969
ZSU-23-4 "Shilka" self-propelled anti-aircraft gun	Soviet Union	1962–present

== Education ==
The census-designated place is physically divided between two school districts: Rock Island–Milan School District 41 to the west and Moline-Coal Valley School District 40 to the east. The garrison provides a school bus service to the Moline district; the local school districts do not have school bus service. As of 2025, the majority of military families live in housing in the wider area, as the Military One Source stated "Government housing is limited."

== See also ==
- List of Civil War POW prisons and camps
- List of National Historic Landmarks in Illinois
