= Fort Armstrong =

Fort Armstrong may refer to:

== Places ==
South Africa

- Fort Armstrong, Eastern Cape along the Kat river

United States

- Fort Armstrong (Alabama)
- Fort Armstrong (Hawaii)
- Fort Armstrong (Illinois)
- Fort Armstrong Theatre
- Fort Armstrong Hotel
