= Fort Armstrong Hotel =

- U.S. National Register of Historic Places
- U.S. Historic district – Contributing property
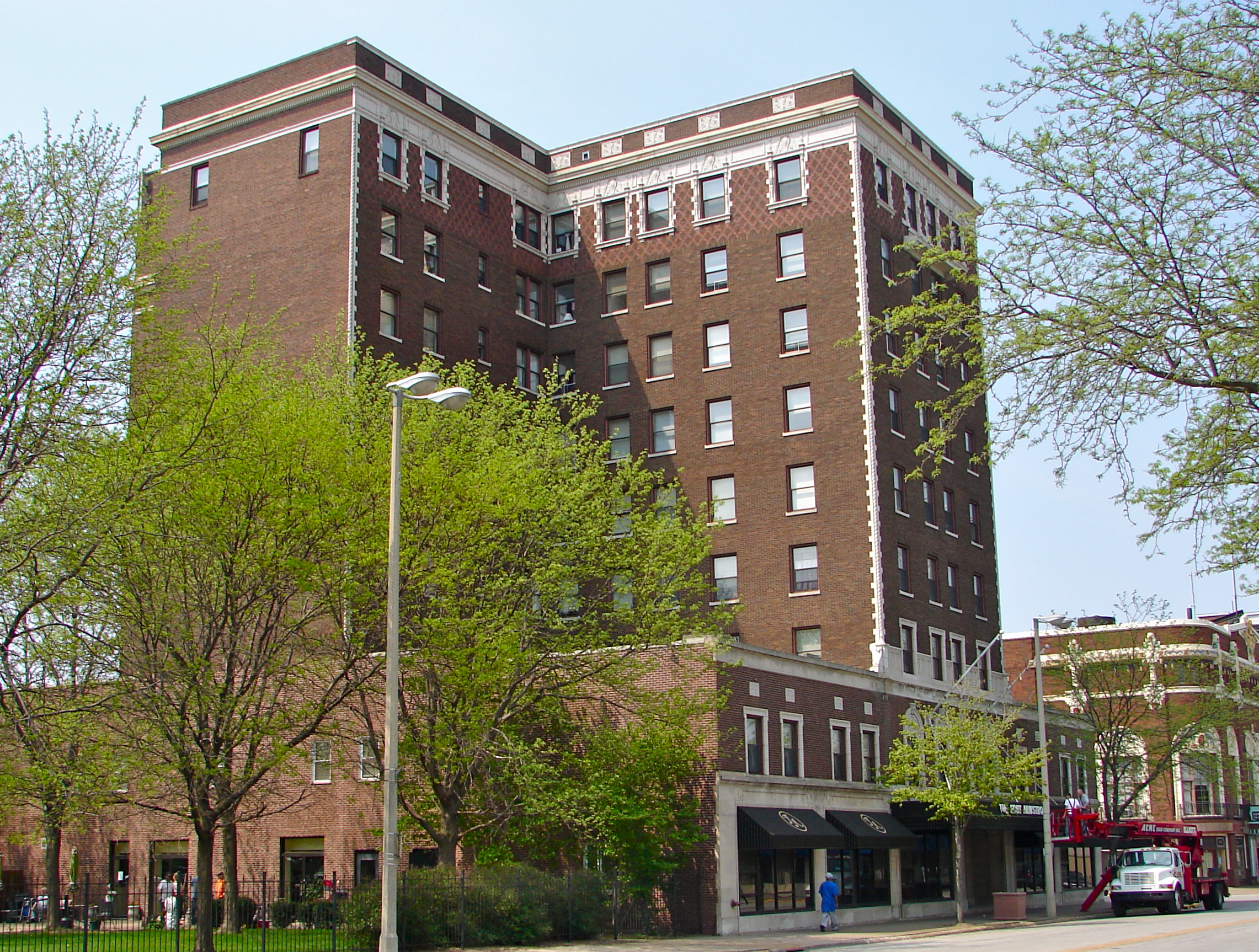

- Location within Illinois Location within the United States
- Location: 3rd Ave. and 19th St. Rock Island, Illinois
- Coordinates: 41°30′34″N 90°34′23″W
- Built: 1926
- Architect: Charles W. Nicol
- Architectural style: Late 19th and early 20th century Revivals
- Part of: Downtown Rock Island Historic District (ID100004433)
- NRHP reference No.: 84000327
- Added to NRHP: November 13, 1984

Fort Armstrong Hotel is a historic building located in downtown Rock Island, Illinois, United States. It was individually listed on the National Register of Historic Places in 1984. In 2020 it was included as a contributing property in the Downtown Rock Island Historic District. The hotel was named for Fort Armstrong, a fortification that sat in the middle of the Mississippi River near the present location of the Rock Island Arsenal. The building now serves as an apartment building.

== History ==
Rock Island was in need of a modern hotel downtown, and to that end over $450,000 was raised in local stock purchases in a week. The total cost of constructing the hotel in 1925-1926 was $800,000. Jacob Hoffman was the hotel's first General Manager. The hotel became the center of business and social functions for the city. However, not all were welcome to stay in the hotel. Jazz clubs along Second Avenue regularly featured African-American entertainers such Louis Armstrong and Ella Fitzgerald. They had to stay at boarding houses across the Mississippi River in Davenport, Iowa because the area hotels would not serve them. Nat King Cole was refused a room at the Fort Armstrong on one of his visits to the Quad Cities. The public spaces in the hotel were renovated in the 1980s and the hotel was converted into an apartment building for senior citizens. Green space for the residents was created after the adjacent commercial buildings were torn down.

== Architecture ==
The Renaissance Revival building was designed by Chicago hotel designer Charles W. Nicol. It is a nine-story building that rises to a height of 98 feet (30 m). It features deep corner setbacks above the second floor that keep the building from dominating the street and allow plenty of light into the rooms. The first two floors of the building are constructed in cast concrete while the upper floors of the building are constructed in brick and trimmed in white terra cotta. The hotel contained 160 guest rooms and ten apartments on the top floor when it opened in 1926. It also featured a banquet room, three dining rooms, a bar, bowling alley, billiard room, barbershop and seven storefronts.

== See also ==
- Fort Armstrong Theatre
