= Fort Armstrong Theatre =

- U.S. National Register of Historic Places
- U.S. Historic district – Contributing property
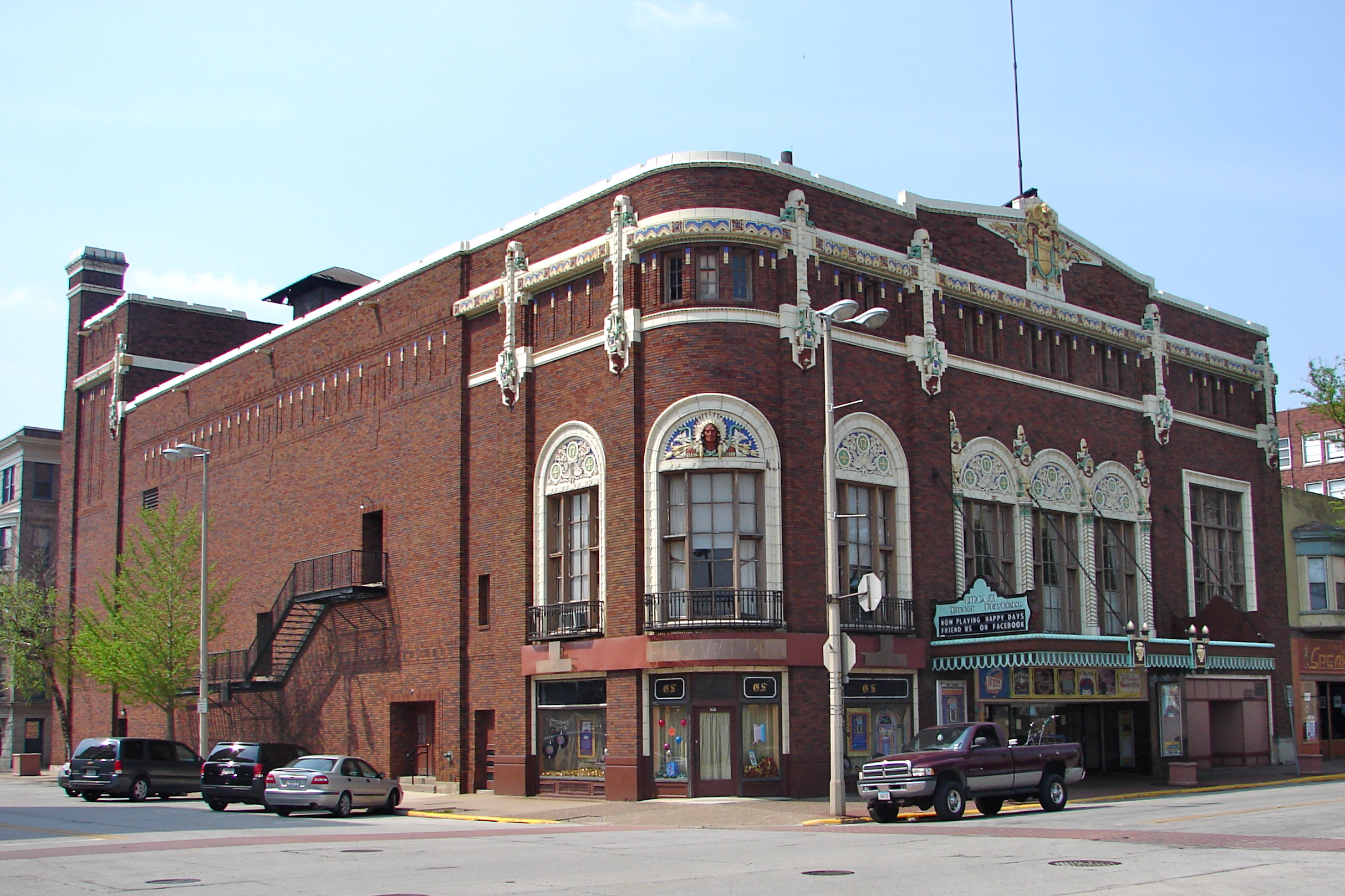

- Location within Illinois Location within the United States
- Location: 1826 3rd Ave. Rock Island, Illinois
- Coordinates: 41°30′36″N 90°34′18″W
- Area: less than one acre
- Built: 1920
- Architect: Cervin & Horn
- Architectural style: Art Deco
- Part of: Downtown Rock Island Historic District (ID100004433)
- NRHP reference No.: 80001407
- Added to NRHP: May 23, 1980

Fort Armstrong Theatre is a historic building located in downtown Rock Island, Illinois, United States. It opened in 1920 and it was individually listed on the National Register of Historic Places in 1980. In 2020 it was included as a contributing property in the Downtown Rock Island Historic District. It was commonly referred to as the Fort Theater. The theater was named for Fort Armstrong, a fortification that sat in the middle of the Mississippi River near the present location of the Rock Island Arsenal.

== History ==
The Fort Armstrong Theatre opened on January 19, 1921. Midsummer Madness, a silent movie by William C. deMille, played opening night. A ten-piece orchestra accompanied the film, and there were other musical and comedic presentations. Lila Lee, who starred in the movie made a personal appearance. Congratulatory telegrams were received from Paramount Pictures President Adolf Zukor, Cecil B. DeMille, and comedian Roscoe “Fatty” Arbuckle. Adult admission on opening night was 36 cents, plus four cents tax, and a child's admission was 20 cents. The theater was originally owned by Rosenfield, Hopp and Company.

In 1976, the theater was purchased by Denny Hitchcock and remodeled. It reopened in 1977 as the Circa 21 Playhouse, a dinner theater. In 1977, the building was listed on the National Register of Historic Places.

== Architecture ==
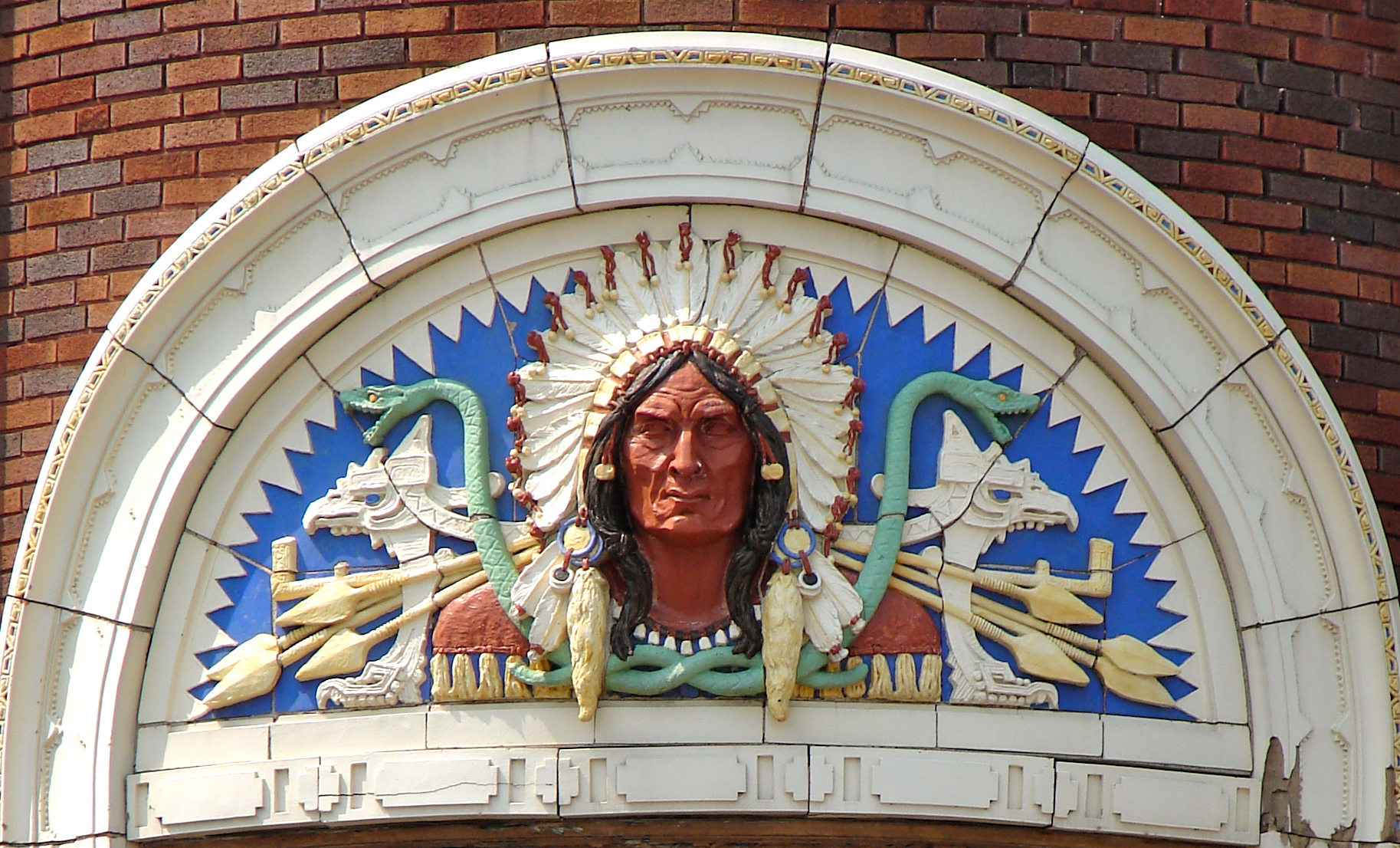
Decorative lunette

The theater was designed by the Rock Island architectural firm of Cervin & Horn and the Chicago firm of Brawn & Ermling. It is a three-story Art Deco style building. The exterior of the structure is faced in Indian red brick and polychrome terra cotta. The terra cotta was designed specifically for the theater by Rudolph Sandberg and produced by the Midland Terra Cotta Company of Chicago. The façade features a curved northeast corner, tympanum-like areas above each window, and terra cotta decorations in Illinois and Native American themes. Ivory is the main color for the terra cotta frame and it incorporates details in yellow, bright blue, green, and brick red. The marquee is a replica of the original.

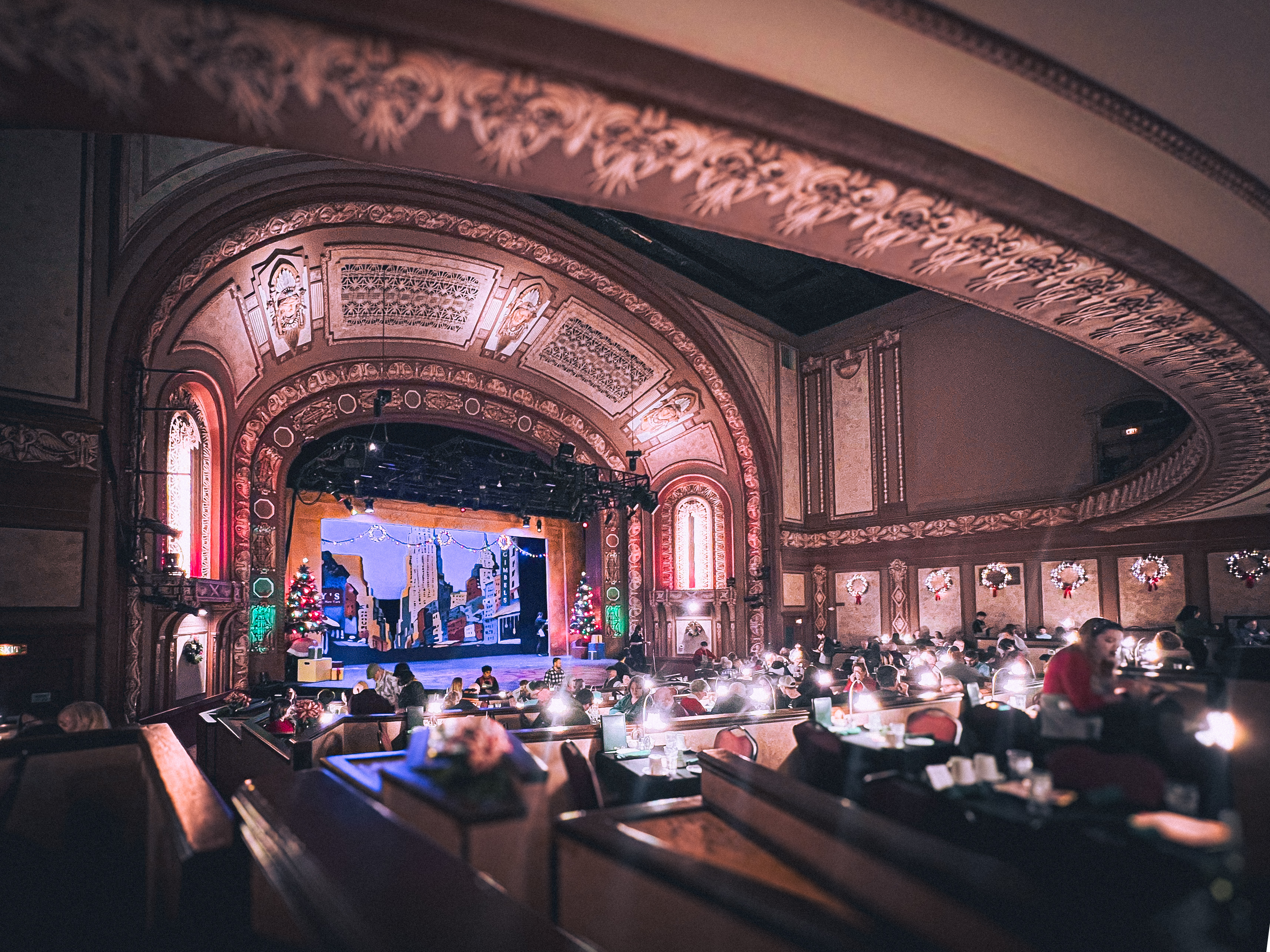
Fort Armstrong Theater interior December 2024

The original seating capacity of the main auditorium was 1,566. It featured five sections of seats and four aisles. The stage is 22 feet (6.7 m) deep. The ornamentation on the proscenium arch features spiral columns and Native American motifs. There are three large Indian heads at the extremities of the arch.

== See also ==
- Fort Armstrong Hotel
