= Joshua H. Hatch =

American politician (1816–1881)

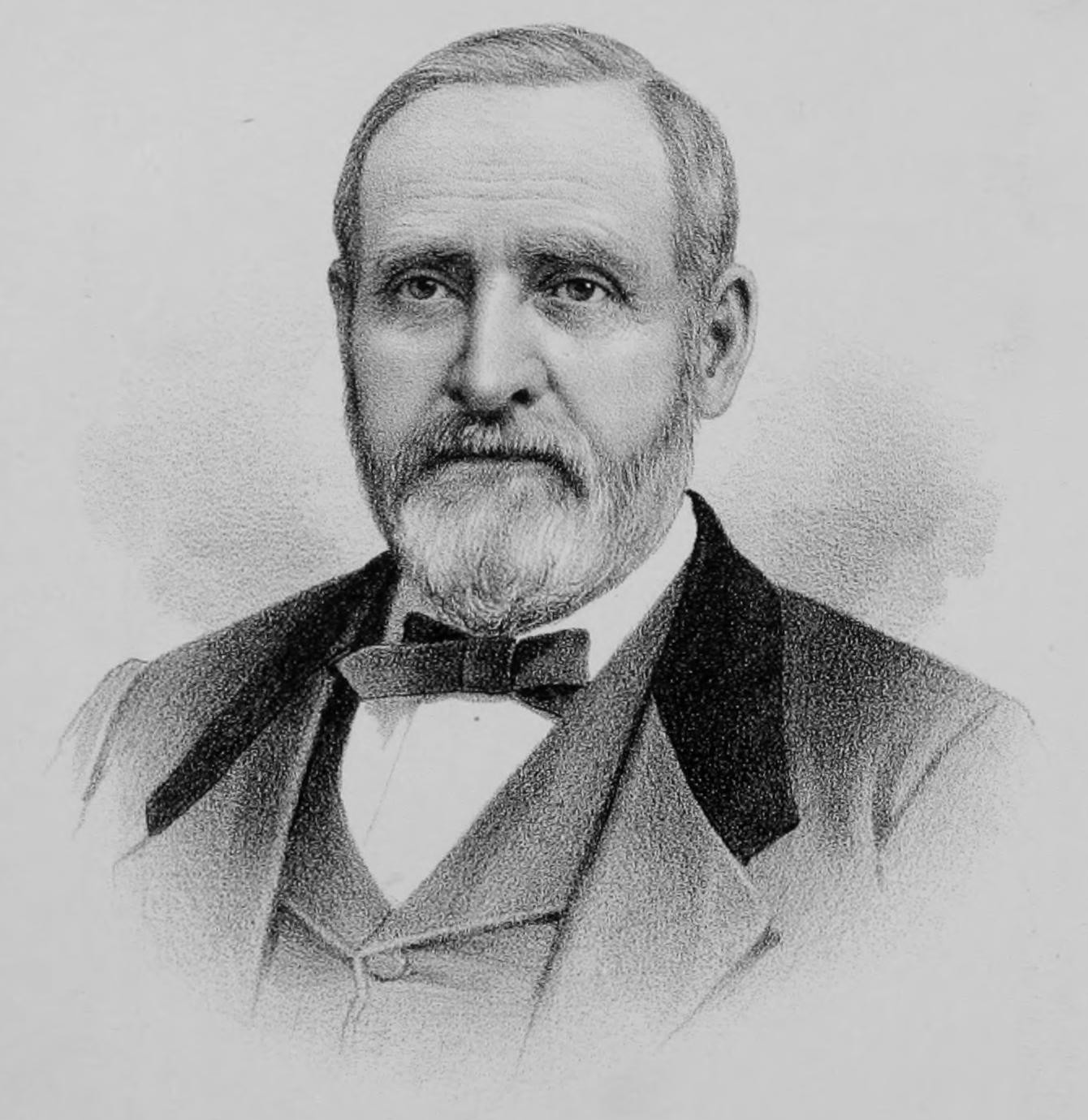

Member of the Iowa Senate from the 28th district 23rd (1862–1864)
- In office January 13, 1862 – January 7, 1866

Member of the Iowa House of Representatives from the 30th district
- In office January 13, 1868 – January 9, 1870

Mayor of Des Moines, Iowa
- In office 1869–1871
- Preceded by: Sumner F. Spofford
- Succeeded by: Martin Tuttle

Mayor of Rock Island, Illinois
- In office 1850–1851
- Preceded by: Benjamin Barrett
- Succeeded by: Patrick Whitaker

Personal details
- Born: November 18, 1816 Williamstown, Vermont, U.S.
- Died: June 9, 1881 (aged 64) San Francisco, California, U.S.
- Party: Republican
- Spouse: Sarah A. Cook

Joshua H. Hatch (November 18, 1816 – June 9, 1881) was an American politician and businessman who represented Polk County in the Iowa Senate and House of Representatives and served as mayor of Des Moines, Iowa and Rock Island, Illinois.

== Biography ==
Hatch was born in Williamstown, Vermont, the eldest of the family and upon his father’s farm he remained until his adulthood, spending his time in farm work and attendance at the common schools. He engaged in teaching school for two winters previous to his move west, which occurred about 1838, his location being Peoria, Illinois. In 1840, he moved to Rock Island County, and for five years was employed as a salesman in Moline. In that county he was married to Sarah A. Cook, the union being celebrated in Rock Island on May 9, 1844.

In 1850, Hatch was elected Mayor of Rock Island and served one term. He continued his residence in that city until 1853, when attracted by the glittering prospects of the West he made his way to California, where he engaged in business until 1856. That year witnessed the arrival of himself and family in Des Moines.

From 1875 to March 1880 Hatch was engaged in the boot and shoe trade as a partner of his son-in-law, W. A. Abbett, under the firm name of Hatch & Abbett. The many official positions which he subsequently held, indicate his popularity and the fidelity displayed in the discharge of the many and important duties devolving upon him. Only four years after he became a resident of Des Moines he was elected to the State Senate and served for four years with credit to himself and satisfaction to all concerned, his district being Polk County. Two years later, in 1868, he was again called from retirement to public life as the Representative of his district in the Lower House of the General Assembly and in 1869, he was elected Mayor of the city and re-elected in 1870. Subsequently he was appointed assistant clerk in the Forty-second Congress.

Hatch was a Republican and he was a member of the Masonic order. He died in San Francisco, California on June 9, 1881.
