= Russel Farnham =

American explorer

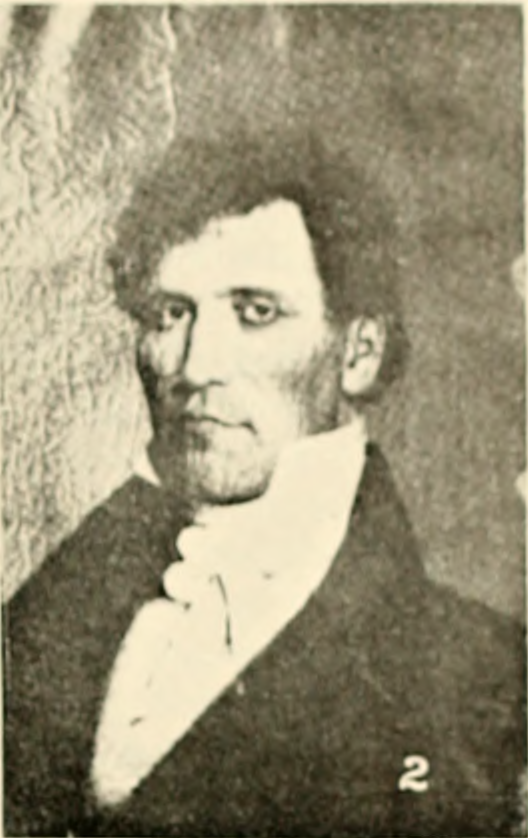
- Born: 1784; Massachusetts, United States
- Died: October 23, 1832 (aged 48); St. Louis, Missouri
- Occupations: Frontiersman and fur trader
- Known for: Member of the Pacific Fur Company and later agent for the Pacific and American Fur Company; first American to semi-circumnavigate the world.
- Spouses: Susan Bosseron (m. 1826–1832) Agathe Wood (m. 1820–1826)
- Children: 2 children

Russel Farnham (1784 – October 23, 1832) was an American frontiersman, explorer, and fur trader. An agent of John Jacob Astor's American Fur Company, he oversaw fur trading in the Great Lakes region throughout the 1810s and 1820s. A member of the Pacific Fur Company headed by Wilson P. Hunt during 1810–1812, he is also the first American to semi-circumnavigate the world traveling by foot from Fort Astoria (now Astoria, Oregon) to St. Petersburg, Russia, to New York City.

== Early life ==
Russel Farnham was born in Massachusetts in 1784 and left home to join one of two expeditions organized by John Jacob Astor to establish the Pacific Fur Company at the mouth of the Columbia River. Farnham, hired as a clerk, was part of the Tonquin party under Captain Jonathan Thorn who were to travel by sea around Cape Horn arriving on the Pacific coast. However, the party soon met with disaster with the death of Thorn and the destruction of their ship soon after their arrival.

== Fur trader ==
In November 1811, he was one of several men who pursued and captured a group of deserters. He also took part in fighting Indians at The Dalles, building a trading post near Spokane and lived among the Flatheads during the winter of 1812–13. According to Washington Irving, Farnham was ordered by Clark to execute a local Native American who had been caught stealing a silver cup from one of the hunting and trapping camps. He hung the Native American from a sapling on June 1, 1813; this incident caused a great deal of hostility between Farnham's party and the local tribes.

In the spring of 1814, he was entrusted with £40,000 in sterling bills as well as papers relating the sale of the Astoria trading post to the British North-West Company and ordered by Wilson P. Hunt, commander of the second expedition, to deliver them to John Jacob Astor via St. Petersburg. Farnham traveled on foot crossing the ice sheet across the Bering Straits and into Kamchatka. He suffered from exposure against the severe and inhospitable Siberian climate and, although leaving Astoria with a small backpack of provisions, suffered from malnutrition having been forced to cut and eat the tops of his own boots to survive. However, he was able to make his way to St. Petersburg and, from Paris eventually arrived in New York City. He was the first American to make the journey, John Ledyard having twice failed to do so. Another account claims Farnham left with Hunt on the Pedler and was dropped off on the coast of Kamchatka on April 3, 1814, and, after arriving in St. Petersburg, instead left from Hamburg, Germany, whereupon he arrived to meet Astor in New York.

Employed by Astor to oversee the business interests of American Fur Company in the Great Lakes region, he was arrested by the British as a spy during the War of 1812. Transported for trial to Prairie du Chien, several of his friends appealed to British authorities of his innocence and the charges were eventually dropped. He made one of the first trips into the Midwest United States on behalf of the American Fur Company in 1817, and later formed a partnership with George Davenport trading with the Sauk and Fox in the Missouri Valley. During this time he took a wife from the Menominee tribe named Agathe Wood and had a daughter.

== Later years ==
Moving to St. Louis in 1826, he married a Euro-American woman Susan Bosseron, the daughter of Charles Bosseron. That same year, while trading at Fort Armstrong, he and Davenport founded a settlement along the Mississippi River known as Stephenson. Along with the town of Farnhamsburg, the two settlements would eventually become the site of Rock Island, Illinois. He also founded Muscatine, Iowa, after leaving the Rock Island area some years later.

He and Ramsey Crooks absorbed the Columbia Fur Company in 1827 and, with former Columbia traders such as Kenneth MacKenzie, the two founded the American Fur Company's Upper Missouri Outfit. He remained in charge of the rival trading post near Fort Edwards (itself near Fort Johnson) and, in 1829, he founded another trading post several miles upriver at present-day Keokuk, Iowa which was run by Mark Aldrich.

He died of cholera in St. Louis on October 23, 1832. He reportedly survived only two hours after having been attacked with that then new and fatal disease. His wife and child died of consumption a few years later. His close friend and former trading partner Ramsey Crooks wrote in a letter to Pierre Chouteau, Jr. regarding news of his death.

Poor Farnham; he has paid the debt of nature after a life of uncommon activity and endless exposure. Peace to his manes! He was one of the best meaning, but the most sanguine men I almost ever met with. During all the ravages of the pestilence here, and the unexpected rapidity with which some of my friends were hurried to their long account. I never felt anything like the sensation I experienced upon hearing of my honest friend's death, for I did not know he was at St. Louis, and thought him safe in some part of the wilderness.
