= Mark Schwiebert =

American mayor (born 1950)

59th Mayor of Rock Island
- In office May 1989 – May 2009
- Preceded by: Robert Millett
- Succeeded by: Dennis Pauley

Personal details
- Born: August 2, 1950 (age 76) Moline, Illinois, U.S.
- Party: Democratic
- Education: Drake University Law School; Augustana College
- Profession: Attorney

Mark William Schwiebert (born August 2, 1950) is the former Mayor of the City of Rock Island, Illinois from May 1989 until May 2009. Prior to his election as Rock Island Mayor, Schwiebert served the people of his City as an attorney and City Councilman since the mid-1970s. Rock Island is one of five cities located in the Illinois/Iowa Quad Cities.

== Background ==
Schwiebert was born in Moline, Illinois to Lloyd A. and Olive E. Schwiebert. He attended Rock Island Public Schools graduating from Rock Island High School in 1968. He graduated from Augustana College in Rock Island in 1972 receiving his BA. In 1975 he received his JD from Drake University in Des Moines, Iowa and his MA in 1976 in History. He was a member of Omicron Delta Kappa National Leadership Fraternity and was president of student government at Augustana. He married Deborah L. Johnson of Moline in 1987.

== Political career ==
Schwiebert first ran for political office when he entered the February Municipal Primary for Rock Island City Council. He won the nomination for one of the three open seats on the City Council. Schwiebert ran a door-to-door grassroots campaign. After a month of hard work campaigning, Schwiebert and his small but well organized staff brought him to victory. He came out of obscurity to become one of the top vote getters in Rock Island History. Out of the three seats up for election he emerged first place defeating three well known incumbents.

In November 1984, the City of Rock Island passed a referendum having City Aldermen run for office in individual wards and establishing staggered elections. In April, 1985, Alderman Schwiebert became the first 6th Ward Alderman, defeating Rock Island High School English Teacher Earl Strupp by a 2–1 margin. In 1987, Alderman Schwiebert was reelected to a third term on the City Council, defeating his challenger by a slimmer margin than in 1985. In 1988, he declared his candidacy for Rock Island City Mayor.

He won the February 1989 primary, defeating his nearest challenger 43% to 18% of the official vote. In his only contested primary for Mayor, Schwiebert was the top vote getter, easily defeating four other well known contestants including two Alderman, a County Board Member, and the City Clerk. He then went on to win the April general election by the largest victory ever achieved by a first term mayor in Rock Island. Defeating 1st Ward Alderman James Kerr 72% to 28% of the vote. He went on to four more overwhelming victories in 1993, 1997, 2001, and 2005, never once falling below 82% of the vote. In September, 2008, he announced that he would not seek reelection in 2009.

It had been rumored for years that the Mayor had intentions for running for U.S. House. In March, 2006, when U.S. Representative Lane Evans announced his retirement after the primary election had been held, Mayor Schwiebert was the second candidate to declare his candidacy to succeed the Congressman. Schwiebert said that due to his close work with the Congressman and his determination to fight to keep the Rock Island Arsenal open he was the best choice to succeed Evans. In a series of debates and forums, Schwiebert made mention of his five terms as Mayor stating that the city made progress in re-development and other economic and social issues. However, he failed to gain the support needed of the Democratic precinct committeemen making the selection of Evan's replacement and ended third place in their voting.

Throughout his 20 years as Mayor of Rock Island, Schwiebert won numerous awards and recognitions. He won the Spiritual Aims Award; Lay Person of the Year; Iowa-Illinois District Kiwanis, 1989; Distinguished Service Award - Rock Island Jaycees, 1990; Illinois Quad Cities Chamber of Commerce Intergovernmental Cooperation Award, 1990; named a Paul Harris Fellow, Rock Island Rotary, 1992; Honorary Doctorate of Humane Letters from Augustana College, 2003; U.S. Army Commander's Award for Public Service, 2009; Isaak Walton League Civic Award for Environmental Leadership, 2009; and Sustainability Leadership Award from the City of Rock Island, 2009. In 2010, Schwiebert Riverfront Park on the Mississippi riverfront was named for him. He is a member of the American, Illinois, Iowa, and Rock Island County Bar Associations and serves on the Board of the Figge Art Museum, Augustana College, and Unity Point Health/Trinity (chairman).

Schwiebert also co-produced a C.D. on the Stations of the Cross in 2007 (The Stations: A Contemporary Setting); as well as published a book of poetry (Pilgrim Footsteps, 2013) and an environmental murder mystery (The Template: A Parable of the Environment, 2016). In 2015 he established the Schwiebert Fund for Environmental Studies to further research and education concerning the environment and climate change.

== Electoral history ==
- April 1981 City Council (three elected)
  - Mark Schwiebert 4,647 23%
  - Robert Applegate 3,942 20%
  - Margery Bensen 3,860 19%
  - Vernon Winter 3,290 16%
  - Lloyd Peters 2,658 13%
  - Tom Darnell 1,693 9%
- April 1985 City Council 6th Ward (one elected)
  - Mark Schwiebert 607 65%
  - Earl Strupp 333 35%
- April 1987 City Council 6th Ward
  - Mark Schwiebert 414 57%
  - William Fields 317 43%
- February Primary of 1989 Mayor (Top two winners nominated)
  - Mark Schwiebert 2,559 43%
  - James Kerr 1,057 18%
  - George Skafidas 992 17%
  - Vernon Winter 752 13%
  - Margery Bensen 593 10%
- April 1989 Mayor
  - Mark Schwiebert 5,512 72%
  - James Kerr 2,169 28%
- April 1993 Mayor
  - Mark Schwiebert 4,555 88%
  - Robert Millett 631 12%
- April 1997 Mayor
  - Mark Schwiebert 4,278 85%
  - John Kammerer 762 15%
- April 2001 Mayor
  - Mark Schwiebert 5,220 82%
  - Vincent Thomas 1,141 18%
- April 2005 Mayor
  - Mark Schwiebert 3,754 85%
  - David Kimbell 653 15%
- Special May Weighted Vote of Precinct Committeemen for U.S. House 2006
  - Phil Hare 17,011 64%
  - John Sullivan 7,530 28%
  - Mark Schwiebert 1,370 5%
  - Micheal Boland 612 2%
  - Rob Mellon 98 0%

== Sources ==
- Rock Island Argus, 1981–2006
- Who's Who In American Politics, 1997

Preceded by Robert Millett	Mayor of Rock Island, Illinois; 1989 – 2009	Succeeded by Dennis Pauley
