= Morris E. Muhleman =

American politician (1915–1998)

53rd Mayor of Rock Island
- In office 1961–1965
- Preceded by: Warren Yerger
- Succeeded by: James H. Haymaker

Member of the Illinois Senate from the 33rd district
- In office 1955–1959
- Preceded by: Charles F. Carpentier
- Succeeded by: Ora Smith

Sheriff of Rock Island County
- In office 1951–1955
- Preceded by: Claude J. Taylor
- Succeeded by: Joe Schneider

Personal details
- Born: June 1, 1915 Rock Island County, Illinois, U.S.
- Died: November 11, 1998 (aged 83) Moline, Illinois, U.S.
- Party: Republican
- Spouse: Winifred McClean (m. 1936)

Morris E. Muhleman (June 1, 1915 – November 11, 1998) was an American politician. He served as an Illinois State Senator, sheriff of Rock Island County, and mayor of Rock Island.

== Biography ==
Muhleman was born on June 1, 1915, to John Muhleman and Harrieta Dahn. He was raised in Rock Island where he attended school and graduated from Rock Island High School in 1933. He married Winifred McClean on October 7, 1936. Prior to his election to public office Muhleman served as a bookkeeper, salesman, was manager and co-owner of a farm implement store.

Morrie Muhleman was an active member of the local Republican Party for years and in 1950 Muhleman was elected Sheriff of Rock Island County. He served in that office until November 1954 when he was elected to the Illinois State Senate. In the State Senate he was vice-chairman of the Senate Highways and Traffic Regulations Committee and also served on the Industrial Affairs Committee, Municipalities Committee, Pensions and Personnel Committee, and the Revenue Committee.

Muhleman was defeated in a surprise upset in 1958 by political veteran and former Illinois State Treasurer, Ora Smith.

In late 1960, Muhleman declared his candidacy for Mayor of Rock Island, Illinois. He won the February Primary and went on to victory in a tight Mayoral election the following April. Muhleman served as Mayor for one term before retiring in 1965. Muhleman's term as Mayor was marked by great cooperation between the city, business, and civic interests.

He remained semi-active in the community as a member of the Masonic Order, the Methodist Church, Kiwanis Club, Chamber of Commerce director, and a member of the local Boy Scout council. Past Fair Association President, and on the executive board of the Illinois Sheriff's Association as well as manager of the Rock Island Centennial Bridge from 1965 to 1980. He was the owner of an insurance company in Rock Island known as the M. E. Muhleman Agency.

Muhleman died November 11, 1998, aged 83 in Moline, Illinois.

== Electoral history ==
November 1950 election - Sheriff

- R. Morris E. Muhleman- 21,860 54%
- D. Howard Gregg- 18,492 46%

November 1954 election - State Senate

- R. Morris E. Muhleman- 28,237 52%
- D. Samuel Arndt- 26,292 48%

November 1958 election - State Senate

- D. Ora Smith- 23,174 50%
- R. Morris E. Muhleman- 22,736 50%

April 1965 election - Mayor of Rock Island

- NP. Morris E. Muhleman- 6,146 53%
- NP. Stanley Erikson- 5,446 47%

Preceded by Claude J. Taylor	Rock Island County Sheriff; 1951–1955	Succeeded by Joe Schneider
Preceded by Charles F. Carpentier	Illinois State Senate, District 33; 1955–1959	Succeeded by Ora Smith
Preceded by Warren Yerger	Mayor of Rock Island, Illinois; 1961–1965	Succeeded by James H. Haymaker
