= Rock Island Public Library =

Public library in Illinois

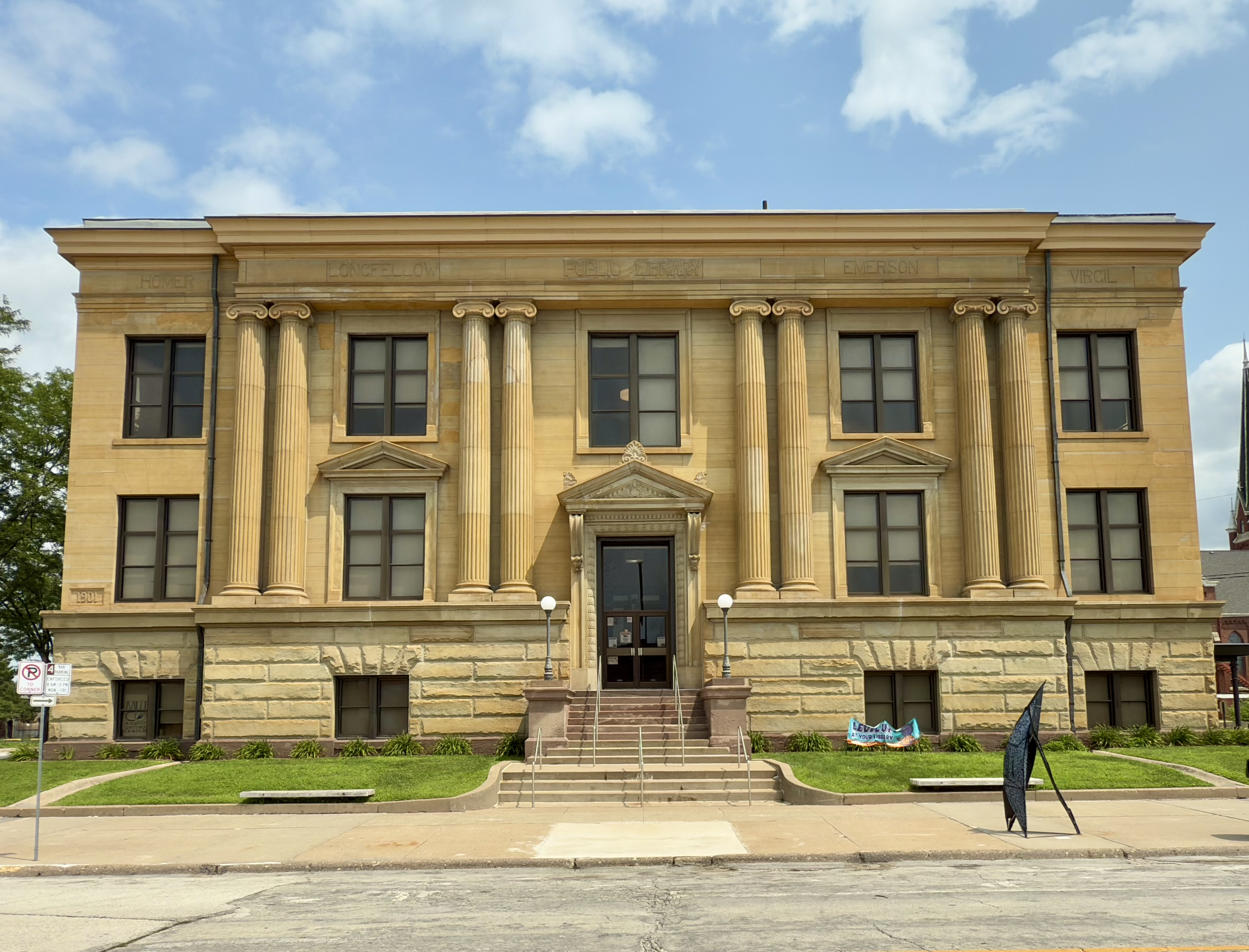
- The Downtown Library in 2025
- Location: Rock Island and Milan, Illinois
- Established: November 25, 1872
- Branches: 3

Collection
- Size: 176,304

Access and use
- Circulation: 199,322
- Population served: 36,018

Other information
- Director: Angela Campbell
- Website: rockislandlibrary.org

The Rock Island Public Library is the public library system serving Rock Island, Illinois, with branches in Rock Island and Milan. It serves the public from the Downtown Library, Southwest Branch, and the Watts-Midtown Branch, as well as a roving bookmobile (Library2Go) and a robust online presence. The Rock Island Public Library traces its beginnings to November 25, 1872, making it one the first public libraries to open after the passing of the Illinois Local Library Act in 1872. Fee-based public libraries started in 1855 in Rock Island and have contributed to the history of Illinois' original library system.

== Association Library 1855-1857 ==
On June 23, 1855, Joseph B. Danforth, the editor of the Rock Island Republican printed an editorial explaining four reasons why Rock Island needed to start a public library. The following week, on June 27, 1855, an anonymous letter was published in the Rock Island Argus, formerly the Republican, offering to give $100 to build a book collection if nine other men would promise to give $100 and if the city promised to give the ten men lifelong membership and a building to store the books. Because nine other men did not step forward to provide the funds needed to reach the $1,000 required to build a collection, Rock Island's citizens decided to have a meeting on September 15, 1855, to decide how a library could be created in Rock Island. The meeting created the Rock Island Library and Reading Room Association, a board of officers and a committee to draft a constitution. Since Illinois law did not include a provision that allowed the city to tax the residents to fund a library, the board of officers decided the library would be open to the "public" as long the man was a Rock Island resident and could pay the yearly membership fee. By the end of the September 15 meeting, the men had raised $500 from their own personal funds, set up another committee designed to raise money for the library and a fee schedule. The library fees ranged from $3.00 for a yearly membership to $100 for a family lifetime membership as long as the children were under 21 years old. For unexplained reasons, the Association Library closed by the end of 1857, forcing library members to store the books in their own homes for safekeeping until another library would open in 1865.

== Young Men's Literary Association 1865-1871 ==
On January 12, 1865, a notice printed in the Rock Island Argus informed the public that there would be a meeting on the 16th for the purpose of creating a new library. An informal constitution and library board was created before the meeting in the hope that a new library would be created. The first meeting of the Young Men's Literary Association was on January 23, 1865, and that night the constitution was adopted and officers were elected. The yearly membership fee was set at $3.00 per year. After setting the business of the library, the next step was to retrieve all of the books that were left at former members' homes when the Library Association closed in 1859, leaving about 1,500 books available for checkout. Almost 1,000 books were never recovered and were lost forever in former members' homes. In April 1866, the library opened six days a week, closing on Sunday. In 1868, the library hired Miss Ellen Gale as the new librarian. In 1872, the Young Men's Literary Association helped start the free Rock Island Public Library by giving the new public library their entire book collection.

== Rock Island Public Library 1872-1901 ==
In 1872, the Illinois State Legislature created a law giving city councils the power to tax citizens for public library funding, effectively creating the public library system in Illinois. The Rock Island City Council was quick to implement the new tax, and the Rock Island Public Library opened its doors on November 25, 1872, with Miss Gale as the head librarian. Miss Gale worked for the Rock Island Public Library for 64 years, the longest tenure of any librarian in the history of Illinois. The public library was able to open its doors so quickly due to the gift of supplies and books from the Young Men's Literary Association, the community's fee-based library from 1865 to 1871. The new public library also took over the association's library's rooms on the second floor of the Mitchell & Lynde Building on Eagle Street. (The location now holds a bank building.) The Rock Island City Library and Reading Room Association occupied these rooms from 1855 to 1859. The library board decided that for all citizens to be able to use the library it had to be open seven days a week, since many people only had Sundays off. By the end of the first two weeks the library had checked out more than 1,000 books. To increase space for both books and patrons, the library board decided to rent another room.

Over the next ten years the library would continue to have budget and space problems. By 1891, Miss Gale had organized the books by subject (history, travel, poetry and fiction) and by alphabetical order within their subject. To raise money for more books at the library, Miss Gale sold copies of the book catalog for $.15 a piece. In 1899, the library had 14,866 books in their collection, 1,070 of them children's books. The Rock Island Public Library had outgrown their three rooms at the Mitchell & Lynde Building and the library board started to look for land and financing to build a new library to support the library's collection of books and the growing population of Rock Island readers. On April 3, 1900, the library board purchased a lot for the new library and on January 10, 1901, the board chose design plans for an Ionic building finished in Italian Renaissance Architecture.

== Rock Island Public Library 1902-present ==
On August 23, 1902, a cornerstone was laid at the northwest corner of the future public library. In September 1902 the decorative frieze was placed around the top of the building. The twelve authors carved into the sandstone are the last names of Homer, Henry Wadsworth Longfellow, Ralph Waldo Emerson, Virgil, Victor Hugo, William Shakespeare, Johann Wolfgang von Goethe, Robert Burns, Esaias Tegner, Alighieri Dante, Nathaniel Hawthorne, and George Bancroft. The total cost of the library when it was completed was $90,448.20, $30,000 over the proposed library budget. The Main Library building opened on December 15, 1903, in downtown Rock Island for browsing. When the library first opened newspapers called it the "Rock Island’s Temple of Literature" and was hailed by the Argus as one of the most "handsomely appointed in the State outside of Chicago." The main, or first floor, was divided between an Adult Reading Room, Children's Department, Reference Department, and enough stacks to hold 16,000 books. The second floor had two unfinished meeting rooms, the Director's Office, and a room to hold local artwork. The only artwork in the local art showroom was a model of the battleship Illinois, made by David Thompson. The basement housed the heating plant, an unpacking room, and a storage room for back issues of the Argus and local historical documents. On May 3, 1937, Miss Gale resigned as the librarian of the Rock Island Public Library. The library continued to grow over the next 100 years by adding branch libraries, additions and renovations to the downtown library, an expanding collection, and the purchase of a new outreach bookmobile.

== Main (Downtown) Library ==
- Rock Island Public Library
- U.S. Historic district – Contributing property
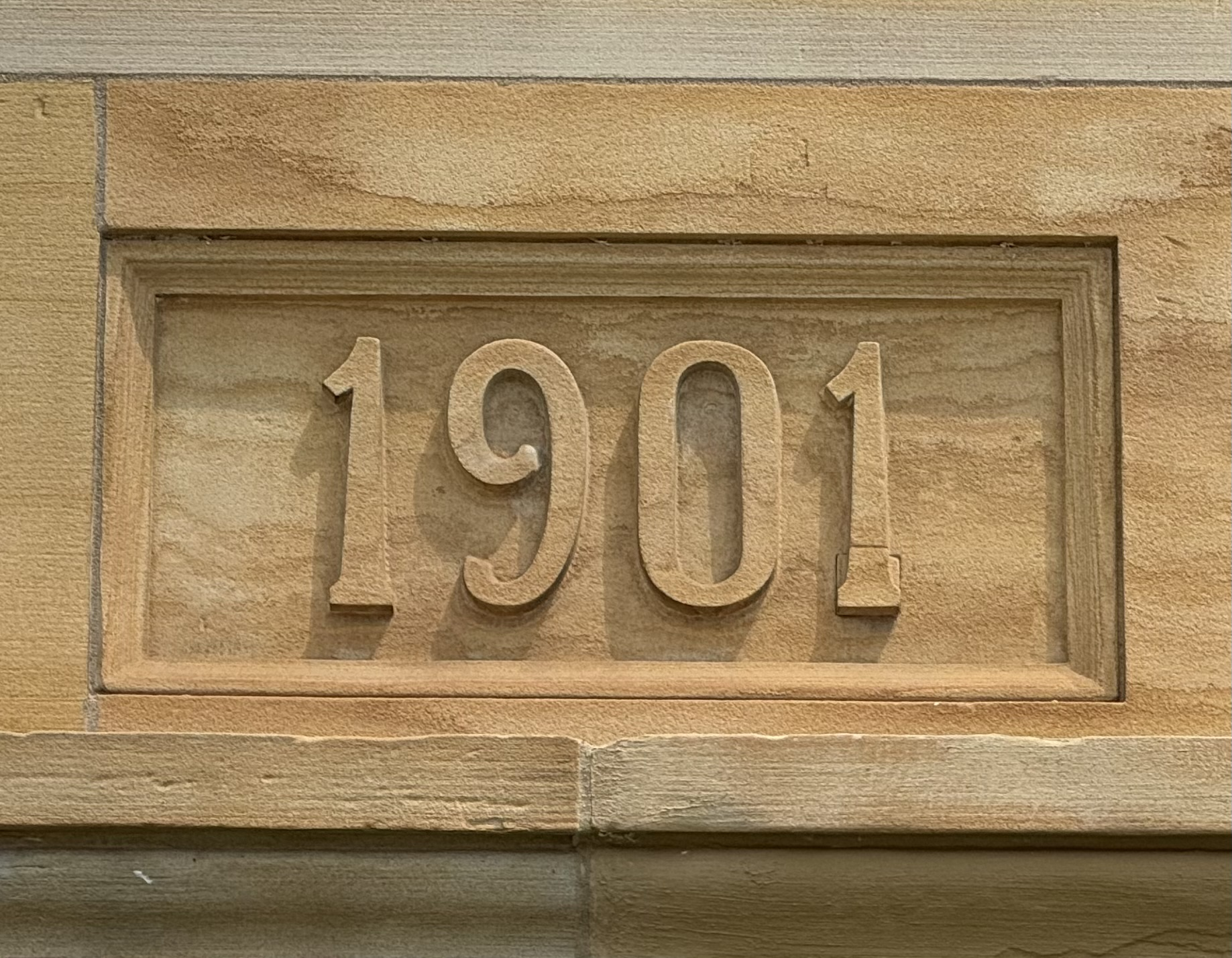
- Cornerstone of the Downtown Library
- Interactive map of Rock Island Public Library
- Coordinates: 41.5086°N 90.5728°W
- Built: 1903
- Architect: Drack & Kerns
- Architectural style: Beaux-Arts
- Part of: Downtown Rock Island Historic District (ID100004433)
- Added to NRHP: March 13, 2020

The Main Library building opened on December 15, 1903, in downtown Rock Island. When the library first opened it was called the Rock Island's Temple of Literature, but the name has been changed to the Main Library since the introduction of the branches. The current layout of the library has changed many times from its original opening in 1903. The handicapped accessible Ground Floor houses the large Children's Department, including children's study area and children's computer lab. The Ground Floor also holds staff offices, bathrooms, a small meeting room, book resale shelf, and two display cases. From 1985 to 2015, one of the larger cases held a display of dolls known as Story Mountain, from a collection originally donated to the library in the 1950s. The dolls of Story Mountain have moved to a case by the Children's Room, with new dolls rotated into the case every few months. The central case holds rotating exhibits. Story Mountain has since been removed.

The main floor or first floor houses the reference and circulations departments, computer lab, and a small local history collection of Rock Island history. The first floor houses new books, fiction, large print, music, movies, newspapers & magazines, teen (young adult) section, book kits, and reference collections. Specialized collections available for checkout include cake pans and cookie cutters. The second floor houses the business office of the Rock Island Public Library, a community room for library programs and public meetings, and an area for local art exhibits. Since 1986, a Mezzanine level between the first and second floors has held the Main Library's non-fiction collection. All floors have wireless internet. A major 1986 addition added a great deal of space to the Main Library. In 2006, the Main Library closed for a month for new paint, carpeting, desk changes, and other space remodeling.

This location is now referred to as the Downtown Library, to more accurately place its location within Rock Island. The phone number is 309-732-READ, which was designed so patrons would be unable to forget the number. The Rock Island Public Library is a member of PrairieCat library network, and of RAILS (Reaching Across Illinois Library System).

The Downtown Library was listed as a contributing property to the Downtown Rock Island Historic District in 2020.

== 30/31 Branch Library ==
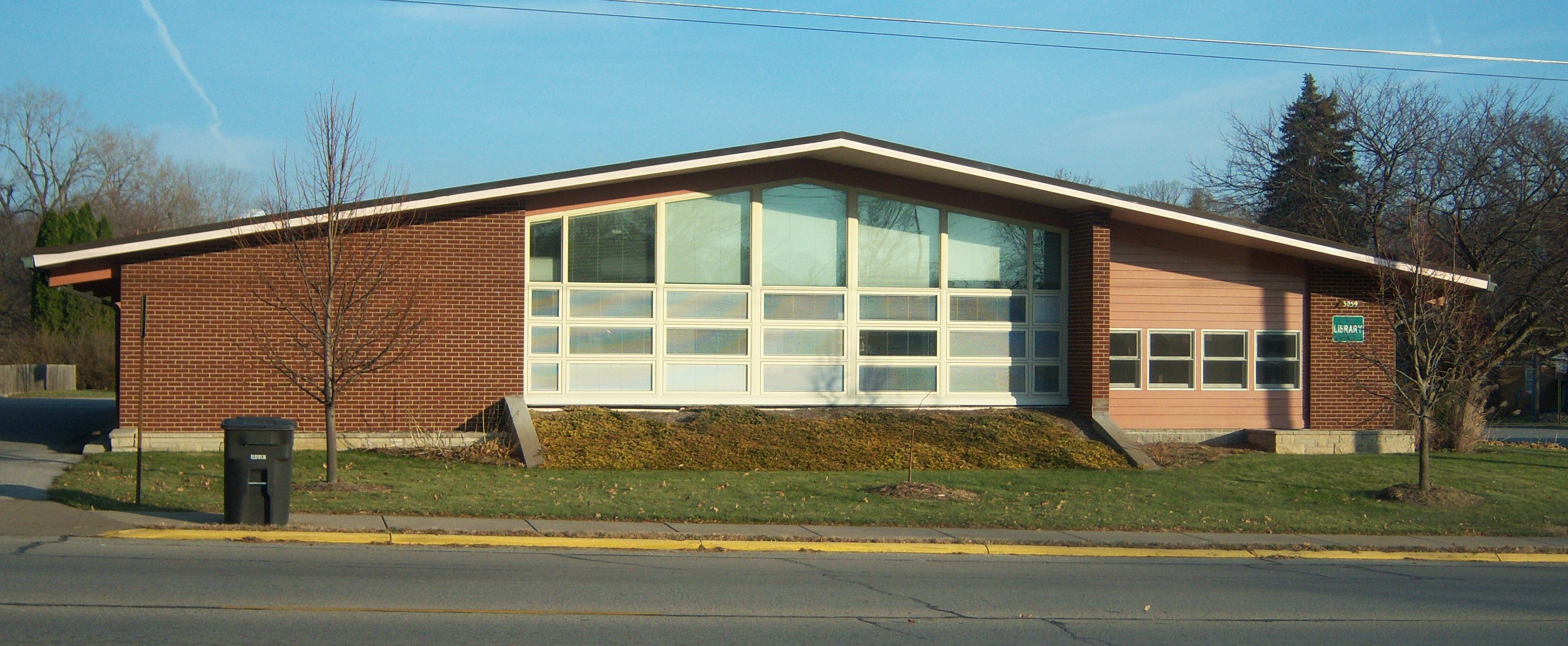
30/31 Branch Library

The 30/31 Branch library is located at the intersection of 31st Avenue and 30th Street, which is why it is called the 30/31 Library. The branch was built in 1957 as a combination library and fire station, which was closed when Rock Island's fire stations consolidated in the 1970s. Soon after the fire station closed the city council decided to expand the library and add the additional square footage to the branch library to serve the information needs of Rock Island's citizens that could not travel to the downtown library. The branch has wireless internet access, a computer lab, children's and adult reading areas and a self-checkout machine. The branch features a drive-up book pickup and book drop. The branch is open six days a week and closed on Sundays. The branch also holds a book sale and program room. The south side of the branch has an Illinois native wildflower garden and table set for patrons wanting to enjoy nature while reading.

This branch was closed December 14, 2019, in preparation for a later sale of the building. The Rock Island Public Library board of trustees formally accepted a bid from the American Doll and Toy Museum. The sale closed August 7, 2020, officially transferring ownership from the Library to the American Doll and Toy Museum. This location is permanently closed.

== Watts-Midtown Branch, Opened February 2023 ==
The Library's newest location is the Watts-Midtown Branch, located at 2715 30th Street, in a building that the library shares with the Rock Island YMCA.

== New outreach vehicle ==
In September 2019, the library purchased a 2014 Ford F59 Walk-in Van bookmobile from LDV Custom Specialty Vehicles. Significant funding for this purchase came from a gift from the Rock Island Public Library Foundation. Named Library2Go, the mobile library began its first routes on January 6, 2020, providing material checkouts, returns, and mobile WiFi access.

== Southwest Branch Library ==
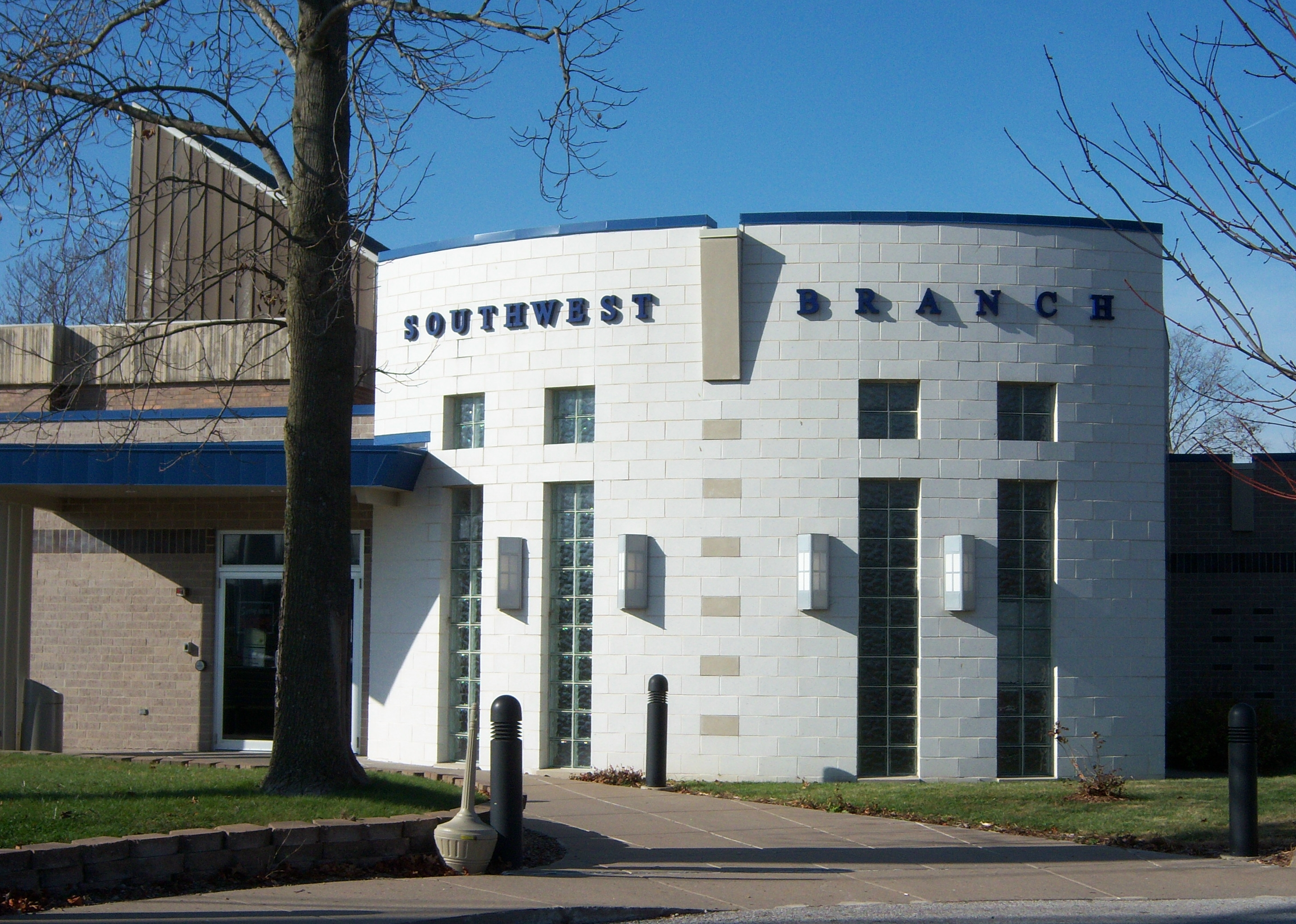
Southwest Branch Library

The Southwest Rock Island branch is located in Southwest Rock Island, an area that is south of the original city of Rock Island and adjoins the village of Milan. The Southwest branch was created to conveniently serve the information needs of Southwest Rock Island citizens. The Southwest Branch Library is attached to the Rock Island Fire Station #2. In 1974, a small library was added onto the side of the fire station, and it opened soon after to the public. In 2001, the branch was renovated adding bathrooms, a community room, children's room, and computer lab and study area. The community room is used for Milan-Blackhawk Area Public Library District board meetings, story times, and other library-hosted meetings and events. The room may be booked to non-profit and business groups for a small charge. To initiate a room request, groups may use the self-service booking feature on the library website, or contact the library Business office. The branch has wireless internet, computer lab, children's and adult reading areas and a self-checkout.
