= Ben Harper (politician) =

American businessman and politician (1817–1887)

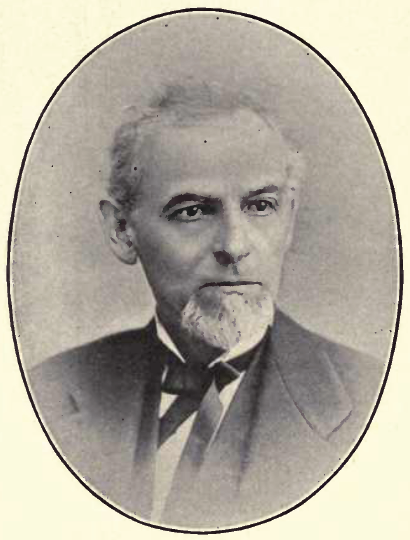

Mayor of Rock Island, Illinois
- In office 1854–1855

Personal details
- Born: Benjamin Harper; February 12, 1817 Philadelphia, Pennsylvania, U.S.
- Died: April 3, 1887 (aged 70) Rock Island, Illinois, U.S.
- Resting place: Chippiannock Cemetery, Rock Island, Illinois, U.S.
- Party: Republican
- Occupation: Politician, businessman

Benjamin Harper (February 12, 1817 – April 3, 1887) was an American businessman and politician.

== Life and career ==
Harper was born February 12, 1817, in Philadelphia. He was the son of the mariner Peter Harper and lived in Ohio and Missouri before he settling in Illinois in 1850.

From 1854 until 1855, Harper was Mayor of Rock Island, Illinois. He was a Republican. A wealthy hotel owner, he was the builder of the Harper House (1871) and Harper′s Theatre (1878). The Harper House “has been described in superlatives, such as the ‘finest hotel between Chicago and the Pacific coast’” (George W. Wickstrom). The hotel occupied the site of the former Rodman House that burned down on October 22, 1869. It is not to be confused with his private home also known as “Harper House”.

Besides real estate, Harper was involved in the Coal Valley mines, Rock Island Gas Works and the Rock Island & Moline Railway Company. Ben Harper died April 3, 1887, in the city of Rock Island. He is buried at Chippiannock Cemetery.

One of his sons, Ben Harper Jr. (1861–1884), was a prominent building contractor in Illinois. In 1907, another son, Stuart Harper (1872–1910), build a prairie style mansion with stucco covered walls at a cost of $35,000. This building is part of “Rock Island's 100 Most Significant Unprotected Structures.”

== Sources ==
- George W. Wickstrom: The Town Crier. Rock Island, IL: J. W. Potter, 1948. (p. 84-87)
- Historic Rock Island County. Rock Island, IL: Kramer & Co., 1908. (p. 85-87)
