= List of mayors of Rock Island, Illinois =

The office of Mayor of Rock Island, Illinois has existed since the Rock Island's incorporation in 1841 with Benjamin Barrett serving as the city's first mayor. Rock Island adopted a Mayor-Council form of government. It held that form of government for the next 110 years when in 1952 the city adopted a new popular form of city government, the council-manager form. Carl F. Bauer was elected as the first mayor under this form in 1953. This form of government still elected a mayor but the mayor is nothing more than a figurehead whereas the true power lay in the hands of the City Council and City Manager.

The Rock Island mayoralty is a ceremonial position that is often used as a stepping stone for higher political office. Most of Rock Island's mayors did not go far past the mayoralty but a few did, mostly running for State Representative, State Senator, and U.S. Congress. Rock Island held partisan elections throughout much of its history. For a brief time from 1911 to 1923, Rock Island's mayor served as a non-partisan mayor; then again in 1923 the City went back to partisan elections. The Republican Party has dominated the mayoralty, the city had more Republican mayors than Democratic mayors. In 1953 when the city adopted the Council-Manager form of government the city once again went to non-partisan elections and it continues to this day.

In 1984 a referendum appeared on the city ballot asking whether voters wanted to adopt partisan elections or continue with non-partisan elections, the referendum was defeated by an overwhelming margin.

== Rock Island mayors ==
Rock Island's mayors since the city's first mayoral election in 1849:

#	Image	Name	Term start	Term end	Party	
1		Benjamin Barrett	1849	1850	Whig	
2		Joshua Hatch	1850	1851	Whig	
3		Patrick Whitaker	1851	1852	Democratic	
4		William Frizzell	1852	1854	Democratic	
5		Ben Harper (1817–1887; aged 70)	1854	1855	Whig	
6		Benjamin Barrett	1855	1856	Whig	
7		William Bailey	1856	1857	Whig	
8		Patrick Gregg	1857	1858	Democratic	
9		Thomas Bulford	1858	1860	Democratic	
10		Calvin Truesdale	1860	1861	Republican	
11		Bailey Davenport	1861	1866	Democratic	
12		Calvin Truesdale	1866	1867	Republican	
13		Benjamin H. Kimball	1867	1867	Democratic	
14		William Eggleston	1867	1868	Democratic	
15		Thomas Murdock	1868	1869	Republican	
16		James Buford	1869	1870	Democratic	
17		Porter Skinner	1870	1871	Democratic	
18		Elijah Carter	1871	1872	Republican	
19		Thomas Murdock	1872	1873	Republican	
20		Bailey Davenport	1873	1874	Democratic	
21		Thomas Galt	1874	1875	Republican	
22		Bailey Davenport	1875	1876	Democratic	
23		William Butler	1876	1878	Republican	
24		Elisha Reynolds	1878	1880	Republican	
25		Henry Carse	1880	1883	Republican	
26		James Z. Mott	1883	1885	Democratic	
27		Thomas Murdock	1885	1887	Republican	
28		Virgil M. Blanding	1887	1889	Democratic	
29		William McConochie	1889	1893	Republican	
30		Thomas J. Medill, Jr.	1893	1895	Democratic	
31		B. Frank Knox	1895	1897	Republican	
32		Thomas J. Medill, Jr.	1897	1899	Democratic	
33		William McConochie	1899	1901	Republican	
34		B. Frank Knox	1901	1903	Republican	
35		William McConochie	1903	1905	Republican	
36		George W. McCaskrin	1905	1907	Independent Party	
37		Harry C. Schaffer	1907	1909	Republican	
38		George W. McCaskrin	1909	1911	Independent Party	
39		Harry M. Schriver	1911	1915	Republican	
40		William McConochie	1915	1919	Republican	
41		Harry M. Schriver	1919	1923	Republican	
42		Walter A. Rosenfield	1923	1927	Republican	
43		Chester C. Thompson (1893–1971; aged 77)	1927	1933	Democratic	
44		Earl C. Dean	1933	1933	Republican	
45		Clarence Hodson	1933	1933	Republican	
46		Herman Brown	1933	1933	Republican	
47		John Graham	1934	1935	Democratic	
48		Charles Johnson	1935	1935	Republican	
49		John Bengston	1935	1937	Democratic	
50		Robert P. Galbraith	1937	1945	Republican	
51		Melvin McKay	1945	1953	Republican	
52		Carl F. Bauer	1953	1957	Republican	
53		Warren Yerger	1957	1961	Republican	
54		Morris E. Muhleman (1915–1998; aged 83)	1961	1965	Republican	
55		James H. Haymaker	1965	1977	Nonpartisan	
56		Alan A. Campbell	1977	1978	Nonpartisan	
57		Martin Galex	1977	1978	Nonpartisan	
58		James R. Davis	1979	1985	Democratic	First African-American mayor
59		Robert Millett	1985	1989	Republican	
60		Mark Schwiebert (born in 1950; age 76)	1989	2009	Democratic	
61		Dennis E. Pauley	May 1, 2009	2017	Democratic	
62		Mike Thoms (born in 1958; age 67–68)	May 1, 2017	May 12, 2025	Republican	
63		Ashley Harris (born in 1980; age 45–46)	May 12, 2025	Present	Democratic	2nd African-American mayor
