= Downtown Rock Island Historic District =

Historic district in Illinois, United States

- U.S. National Register of Historic Places
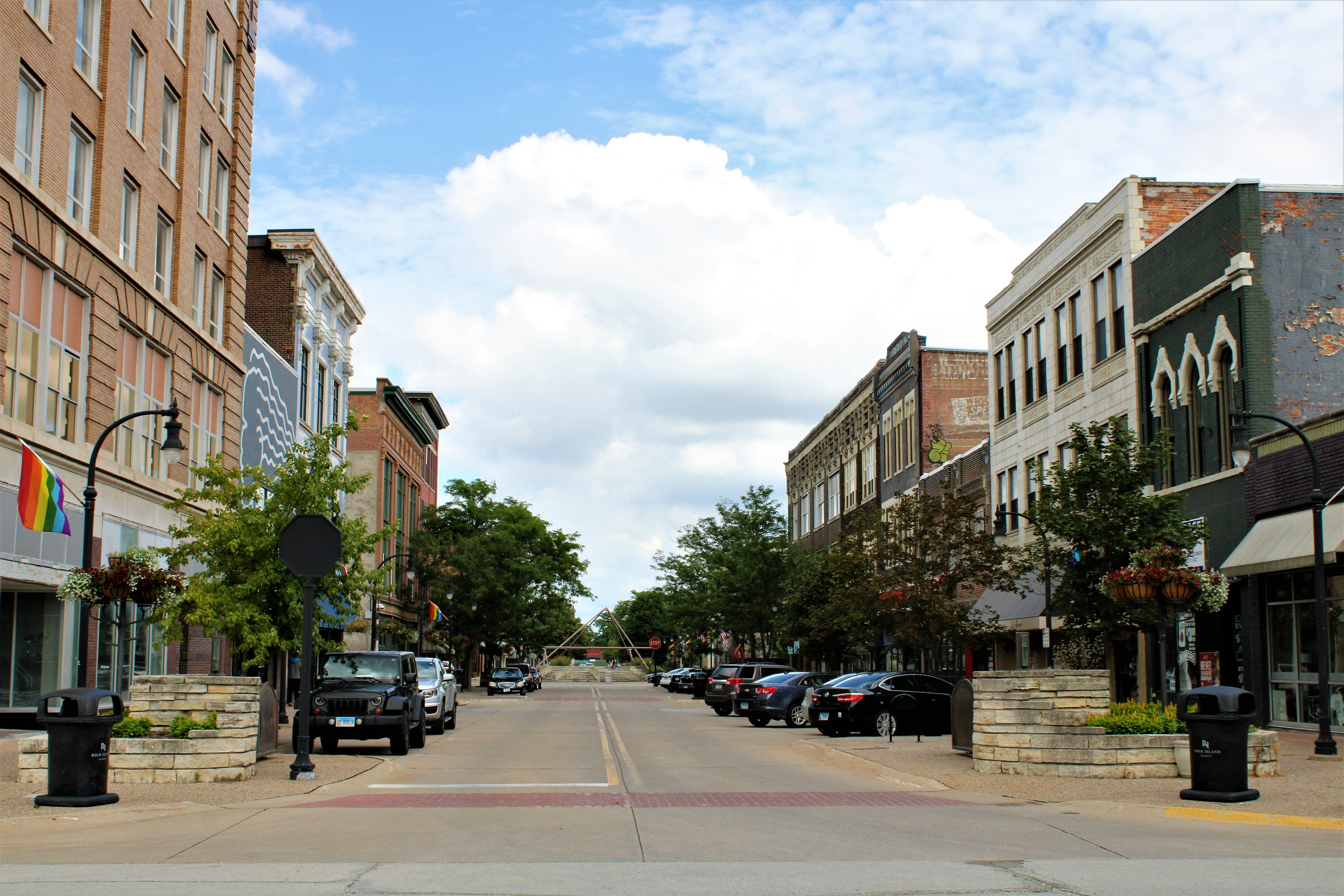

- Location within Illinois Location within the United States
- Location: Roughly bound by Iowa terminus of the Centennial Bridge at West 2nd St. Davenport, IA, 21st St., 15th St., and 5th Ave., Rock Island, Illinois
- Coordinates: 41°30′36″N 90°34′29″W
- Area: 82.3 acres (33.3 ha)
- NRHP reference No.: 100004433
- Added to NRHP: March 13, 2020

The Downtown Rock Island Historic District is a national historic district encompassing 82.3 acres (33.3 ha) in downtown Rock Island, Illinois. The oldest buildings in the district are from the 1860s, two decades after Rock Island's founding, and buildings from then until 1969 can be found in the district, making it reflective of the city's development over time. The majority of the buildings in the district are commercial buildings, as downtown Rock Island has historically been the city's commercial center; these include several building types, mainly one-part and two-part commercial blocks, designed in a wide variety of the architectural styles popular in the late nineteenth and early to mid twentieth centuries. The district was also historically the center of Rock Island's social life, and many theaters and clubhouses for social organizations can be found in the district. Several of Rock Island's major government buildings, including the city hall and old county courthouse, are also part of the district.

The district was added to the National Register of Historic Places on March 13, 2020.
