= Fort Armstrong (Illinois) =

Former United States military installation

Coordinates: 41.5165°N 90.5639°W

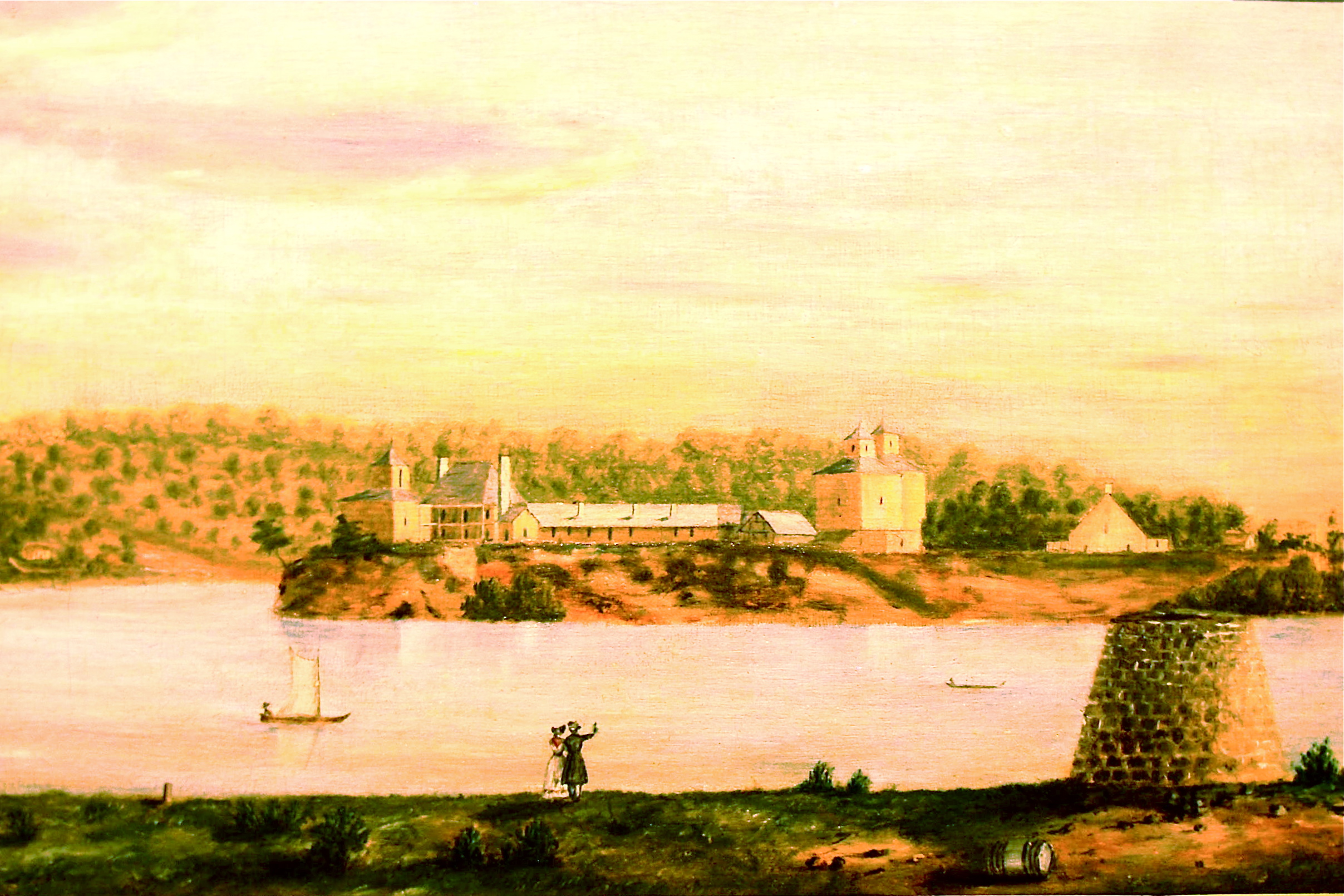
1839 painting of Fort Armstrong, six years after the removal of the Sauk and Meskwaki tribes, on the U.S. Army's present-day Rock Island Arsenal, looking toward Iowa in the background from the Illinois side of the Mississippi River, attributed to Octave Blair.

Fort Armstrong (1816–1836), was one of a chain of western frontier defenses which the United States erected after the War of 1812. It was located at the foot of Rock Island, in the Mississippi River near the present-day Quad Cities of Illinois and Iowa. It was five miles from the principal Sauk and Meskwaki village on the Rock River in Illinois. Of stone and timber construction, 300 feet square, the fort was begun in May 1816 and completed the following year and consisted of three large blockhouses, like the replica, on its prominent corners. In 1832, the U.S. Army used the fort as a military headquarters during the Black Hawk War. It was normally garrisoned by two companies of United States Army regulars. With the pacification of the Indian threat in Illinois, the U.S. Government ceased operations at Fort Armstrong and the U.S. Army abandoned the frontier fort in 1836.

== Purpose ==
Fort Armstrong served five purposes of the United States. First, as a U.S. Army base of operations as mentioned earlier. Second, it was the regional headquarters location for the Indian Agent. The Indian Agent served in a liaison capacity between the regional Native American tribes and the United States government. Third, the regional interpreter who served both civilians and Soldiers at the request of both Americans and Native Americans. Fourth, the trade industry that thrived between civilians (settlers), U.S. Army Soldiers, and local Native Americans. Fifth, the U.S. Army surgeon was stationed there that really served as the regional hospital.

== Rock Island before construction ==
In 1805, when President Thomas Jefferson sent Lewis and Clark on their expedition into the Louisiana Territory, he also sent Lieutenant Zebulon Pike and Major Stephen H. Long up the Mississippi River to gather data and determine strategic sites for forts. Pike identified one site as the "big island;" Congress agreed with his recommendation, reserving the island for military use in 1809 and naming it Rock Island.

The Sauk considered the island sacred:

This [island] was the best one on the Mississippi, and had long been the resort of our young people during the summer. It was our garden, like the white people have near their big villages, which supplied us with strawberries, blackberries, gooseberries, plums, apples and nuts of different kinds. Being situated at the foot of the rapids, its waters supplied us with the finest fish. In my early life I spent many happy days on this island. A good spirit had charge of it, which lived in a cave in the rocks immediately under the place where the fort now stands. This guardian spirit has often been seen by our people. It was white, with large wings like a swan's, but ten times larger. We were particular not to make much noise in that part of the island which it inhabited, for fear of disturbing it. But the noise at the fort has since driven it away, and no doubt a bad spirit has taken its place.

— Black Hawk

== Construction ==
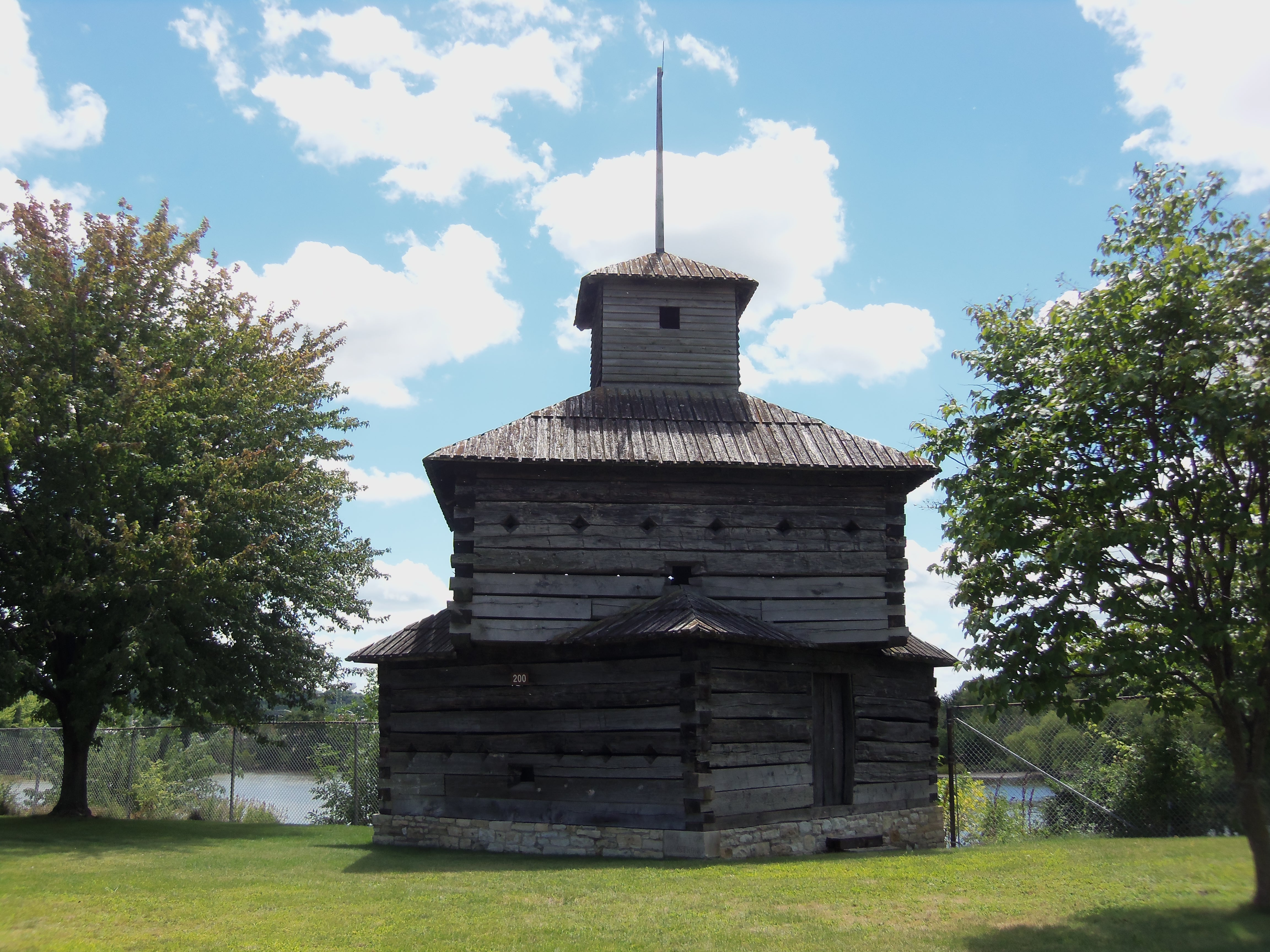
The historical reconstruction of a Fort Armstrong, three story, blockhouse, on the U.S. Army's, Rock Island Arsenal Island

This was to be the second US fort between St. Louis and Prairie du Chien, Wisconsin. The US wanted to establish a military presence to dissuade the French and English Canadians (who traded in areas nearby) from encroaching upon the unorganized territory. After its losses at several forts during the War of 1812, the US Army wanted to increase its presence on the Mississippi frontier. The fort also would serve to protect American settlers within the area and to help control or remove the Sauk, a Native American people in the region. The Sauk disapproved of its construction; Black Hawk wrote in his memoir, "When we arrived we found that the troops had come to build a fort on Rock Island. This, in our opinion, was a contradiction to what we had done– 'to prepare for war in time of peace.' We did not object, however, to their building their fort on the island, but were very sorry."

On May 10, 1816, soldiers arrived to begin construction of Fort Armstrong. It was named after John Armstrong, the Secretary of War under President James Madison. The army assigned 600 soldiers and 150 laborers to the project. After the construction was completed, fewer than 200 soldiers garrisoned the post. Between 1824 and 1836, the garrison was reduced to fewer than 100 troops. From 1840-1845 it served as a military depot, where the U.S. Army would keep war time supplies. one of the three buildings of Fort Armstrong was destroyed by fire in 1855. The account of the fire from the U.S. Army Quartermaster stationed there at the time described an unknown perpetrator with the ill intent of stealing kegs of black powder and keg parts for their own financial gain. The remaining two building were destroyed to make way for what would become the new fort of Rock Island Arsenal.

== Black Hawk War (May 1832 – September 1832) ==
The Black Hawk War, (May 1832 to September 1832) named after the Sauk Chief Black Hawk, was a result of rising tensions between Native Americans in the greater territory areas of Wisconsin, Indiana, Ohio, and Illinois. As British and Spanish influenced waned, the United States started to expand. Seeking to avoid future conflict, the United States government signed the Treaty of St. Louis with five prominent Sauk and Fox chiefs, resulting in the United States purchasing Illinois from the tribes and being given new lands in Iowa. Unhappy with the treaty and distrusting of the five chiefs who had signed, Black Hawk gathered other disaffected Sauk and Fox to his cause and crossed back into Illinois, where he began raiding settlements and farms.

=== Cholera epidemic ===
During the Black Hawk War of 1832, General Winfield Scott led 1000 troops to Fort Armstrong, to assist the U.S. Army garrison and militia volunteers stationed there. General Scott's army had contracted Asiatic cholera before they left the state of New York, and by the time the final march from Fort Dearborn in modern day Chicago to Rock Island, Illinois was completed only 220 soldiers remained alive. Winfield Scott and his troops likely carried the highly contagious disease with them. As a result, soon after their arrival a local cholera epidemic broke out among both whites and Indians around the area of Fort Armstrong. Cholera microbes were most likely spread through sewery-type contaminated water, which mixed with clean drinking water, brought on by poor sanitation practices of the day. Within eight days, 189 people died and were buried on the island.

=== Treaty negotiations ===
On September 21, 1832, the Black Hawk War officially came to an end with the treaty signed at Fort Armstrong. The defeated Sauk and Fox Indians agreed to cede to the US the lands they occupied east of the Mississippi River. Black Hawk, two of his sons, and other Sac and Fox warriors had been taken to the fort as prisoners after their captures following the Battle of Bad Axe. They spent the winter held at Jefferson Barracks in St. Louis, after which the Army took the men on a tour of Eastern cities, hoping to impress them with the wealth and power of white civilization. The natives met with President Andrew Jackson and were of great interest and celebrity among the white population, who at that period admiringly viewed natives as "noble savages." After a brief period of imprisonment at Fortress Monroe at Hampton Roads, Virginia, the Sauk and Fox warriors were allowed to return to Iowa. Together with their people, they occupied a small reservation in Iowa allotted by the Treaty of Fort Armstrong. Black Hawk died there in 1838.

== See also ==
- Rock Island Arsenal
