= Rock Island, Illinois =

City in Illinois, United States

- City
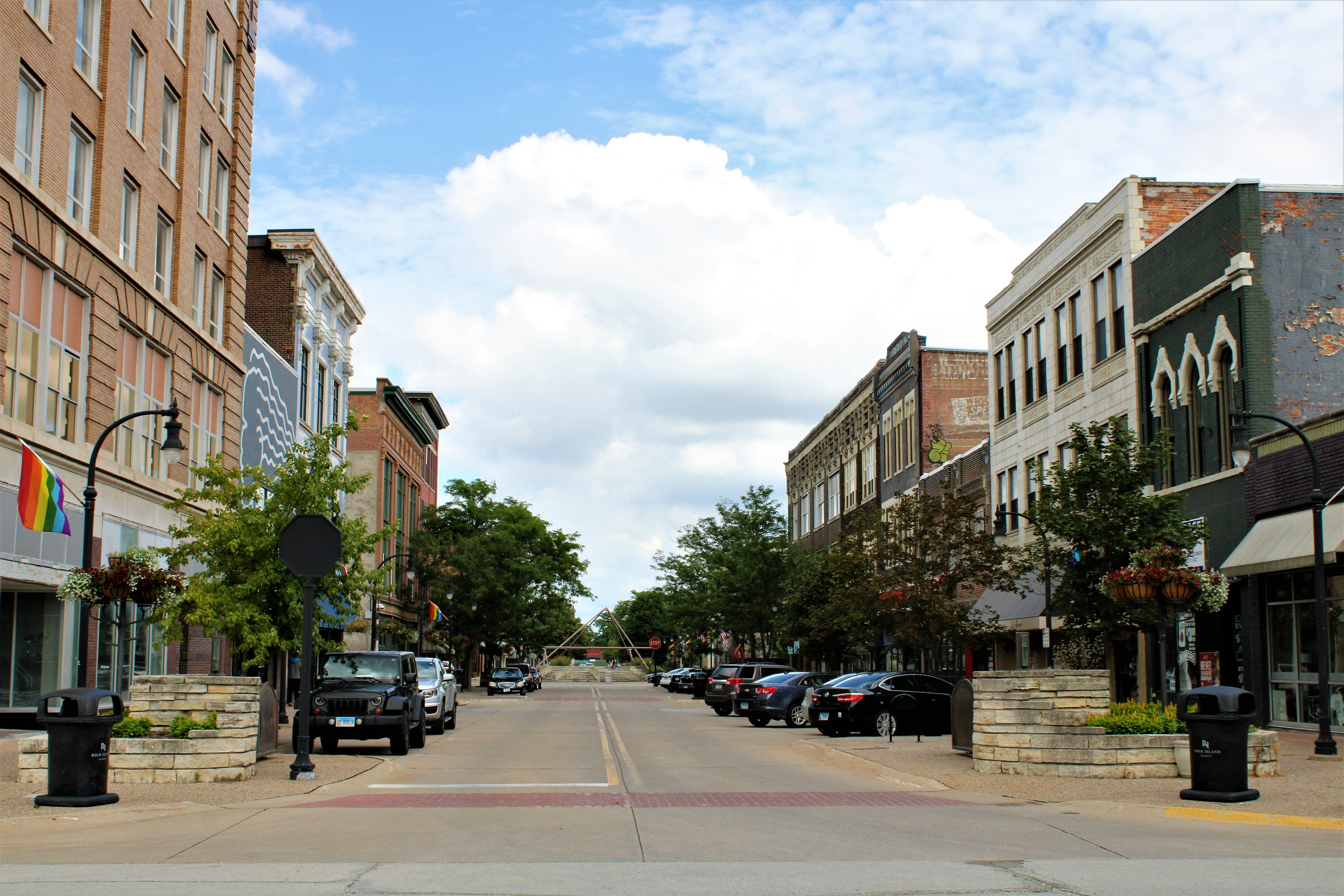
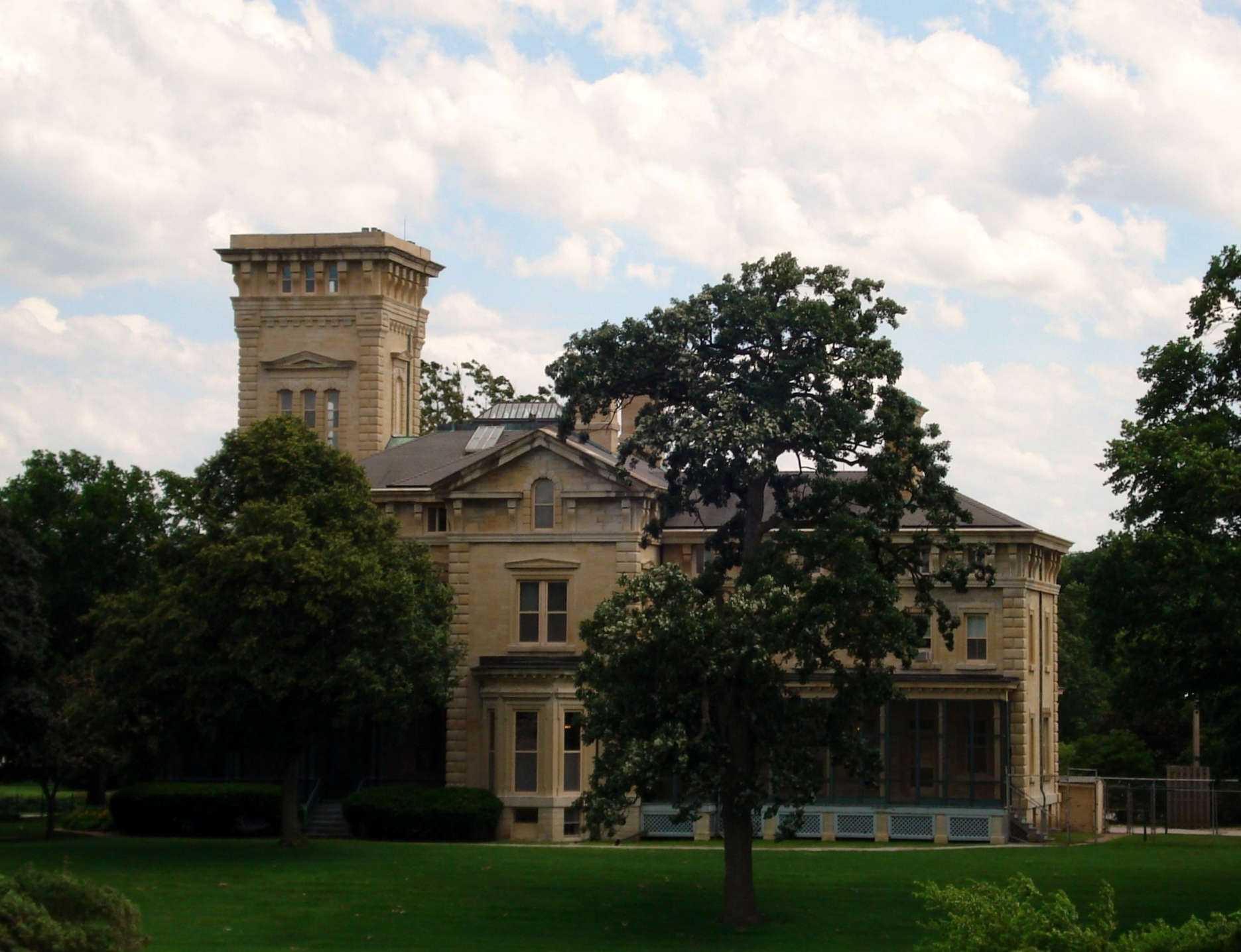
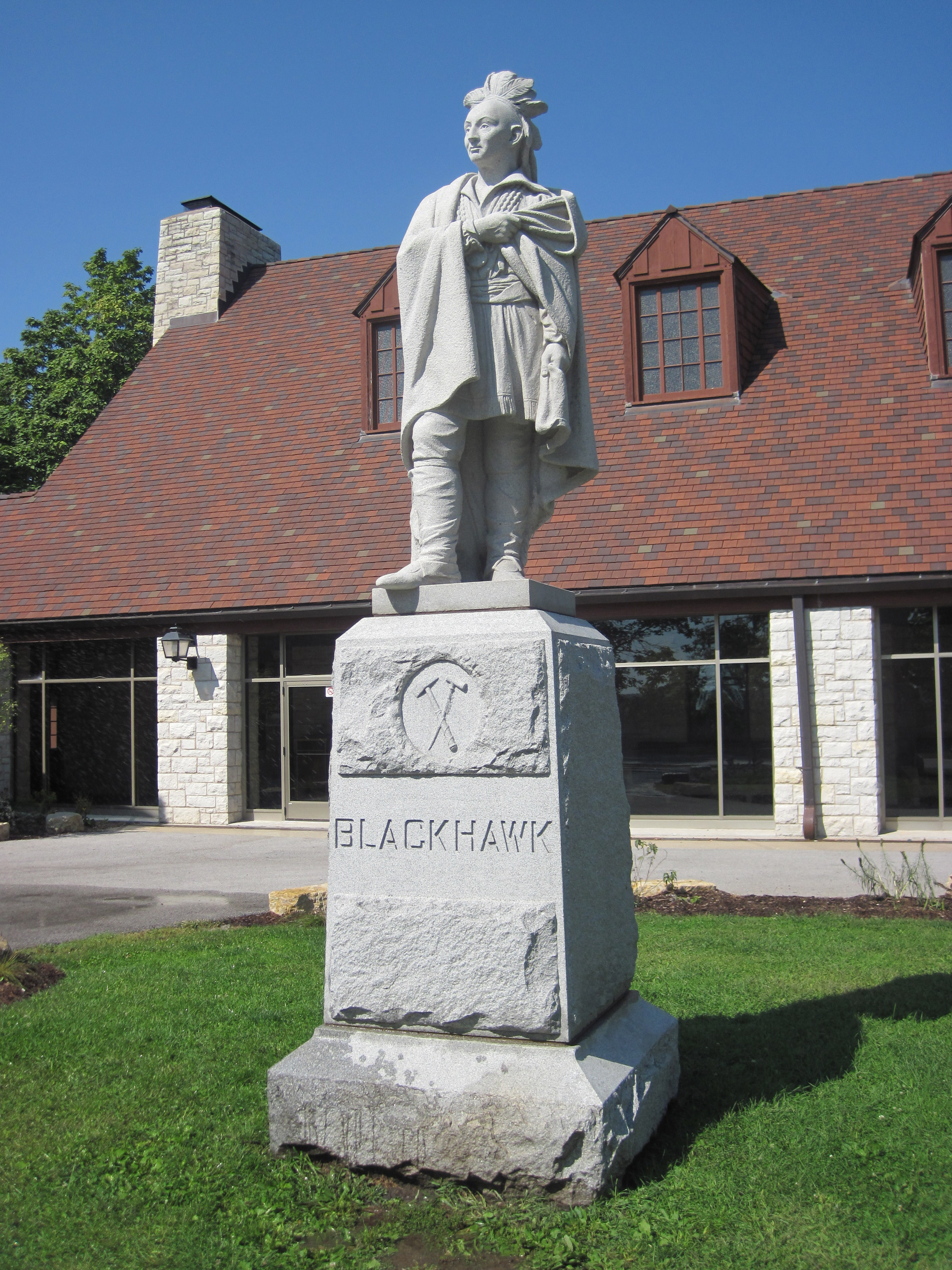
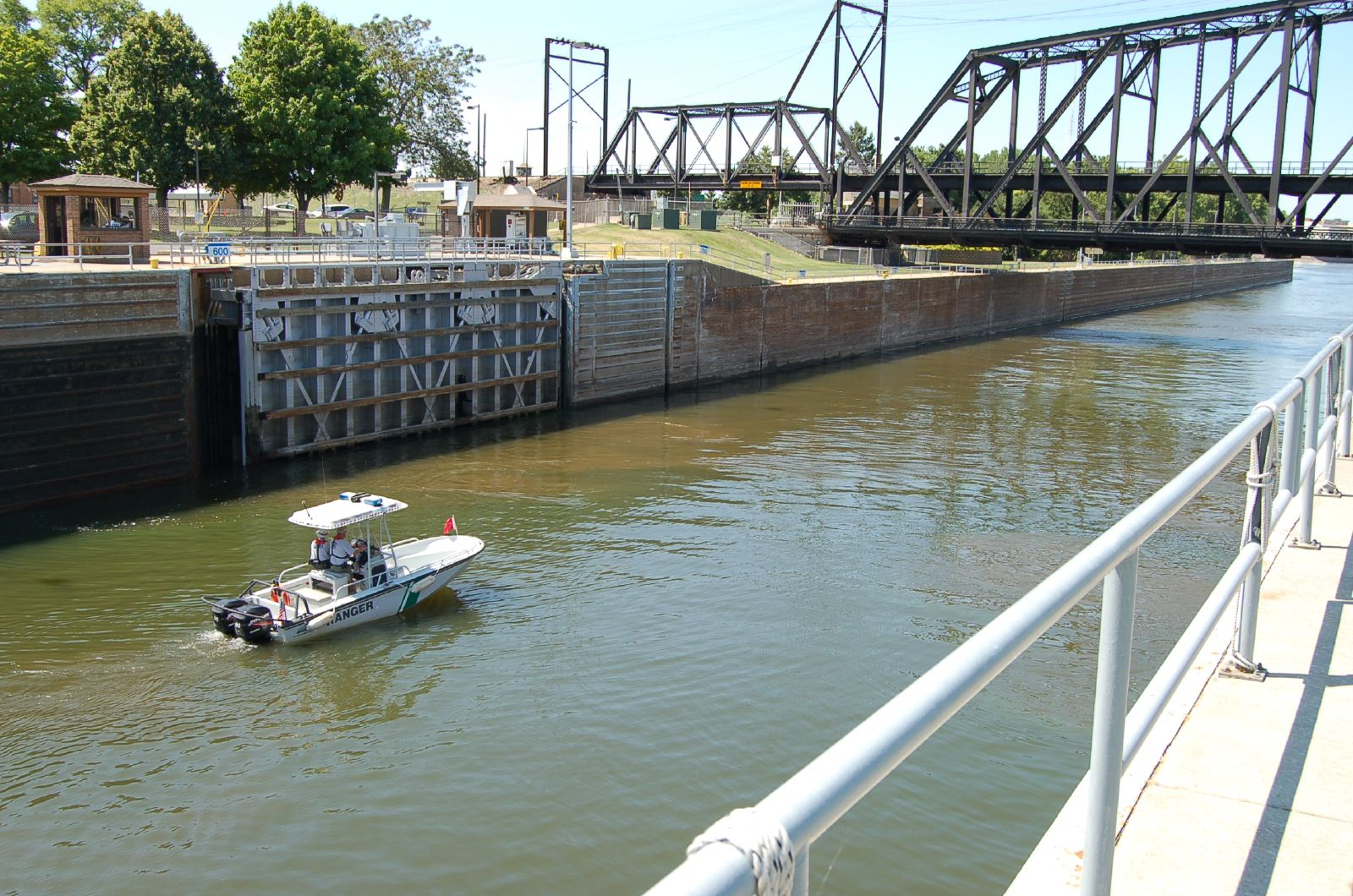
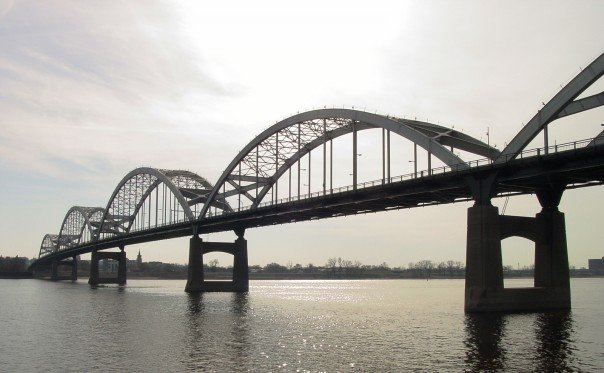
- Downtown Rock Island Rock Island Arsenal Black Hawk Site Lock and Dam No. 15 Centennial Bridge

- Flag Seal Logo
- Motto: Rock Solid, Rock Island
- Interactive map of Rock Island, Illinois
- Location within Illinois Location within the United States
- Coordinates: 41°28′12″N 90°35′30″W
- Country: United States
- State: Illinois
- County: Rock Island
- Incorporated: 1841

Government
  - Mayor: Ashley Harris (D)

Area
  - City: 17.07 sq mi (44.22 km^{2})
  - Land: 16.87 sq mi (43.70 km^{2})
  - Water: 0.20 sq mi (0.53 km^{2})
- Elevation: 623 ft (190 m)

Population (2020)
  - City: 37,108
  - Density: 2,199.5/sq mi (849.23/km^{2})
  - Metro: 384,324 (US: 147th)
  - CSA: 474,019 (US: 90th)
- Time zone: UTC−6 (CST)
  - Summer (DST): UTC−5 (CDT)
- ZIP Codes: 61201, 61204, 61299
- Area code: 309
- FIPS code: 17-65078
- GNIS feature ID: 2396400
- Website: rigov.org

Rock Island is a city in Rock Island County, Illinois, United States, and its county seat. The population was 37,108 at the 2020 census. Located at the confluence of the Rock and Mississippi rivers, it is one of the Quad Cities along with neighboring Moline and East Moline in Illinois and the cities of Davenport and Bettendorf in Iowa. The Quad Cities metropolitan area had a population of 384,324 in 2020.

The city is home to Rock Island Arsenal, the largest government-owned weapons manufacturing arsenal in the United States, which employs 6,000 people. The original Rock Island, from which the city name is derived, is now called Arsenal Island.

== History ==
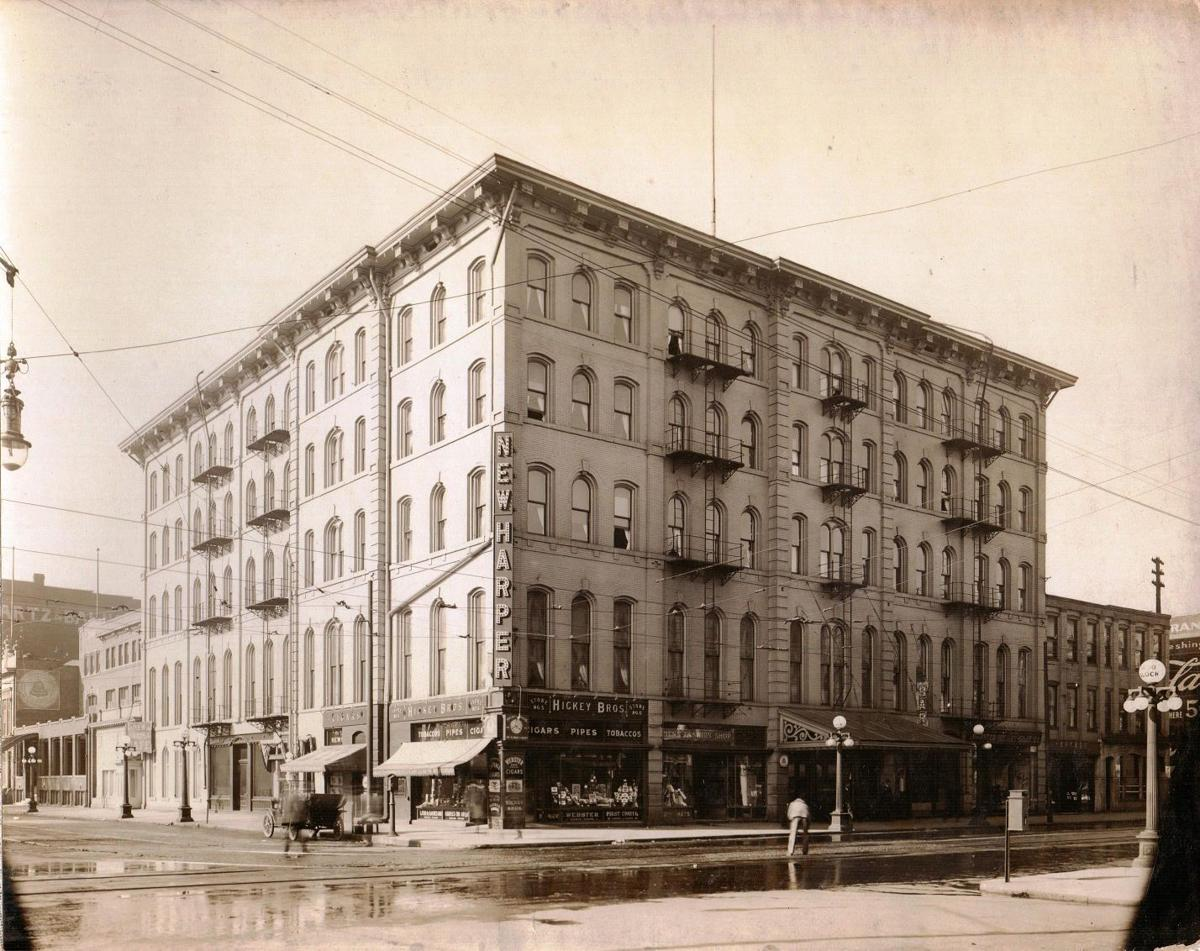
The Harper House

The original portion of what is now known as Rock Island was called Farnhamsburg – after the original two homes were built by Colonel George Davenport and Russell Farnham in 1826. Davenport and Farnham were business partners, trading with the local Native Americans. The original city plat was filed on July 10, 1835, and was named Stephenson. It was renamed Rock Island in March 1841.

The southern portion of Rock Island, including today's Watch Hill area, was originally known as Searstown. It was named after David B. Sears, who built the Sears Power Dam on the Rock River. Searstown was annexed by Rock Island in 1915.

The Chicago, Rock Island & Pacific Railroad (RI) was founded here in 1851, known informally as the Rock Island Line; over the next century, the railroad grew to serve fourteen states but ended in bankruptcy in 1980. As part of later nineteenth-century development, two first-class hotels: the Harper House (built by Ben Harper and opened in February 1871) and the Rock Island House were built in town. The Rock Island Arsenal has manufactured military equipment and ordnance for the U.S. Army since the 1880s.

The Rock Island Southern Railway was an interurban line that ran from Rock Island to Monmouth, Illinois, then onward to Galesburg, Illinois. It was built between 1906 and 1910. A portion of the trackage, from Rock Island to Preemption, Illinois, was shared with the CRI&P line that served the coal mines in Cable, Illinois, and Sherrard, Illinois. The line finally folded in 1952.

Construction began in April 2017 for a new Rock Island County courthouse. The $28 million project was completed in the fall of 2018, and the old courthouse was expected to be torn down upon completion of the new building. Resident opposition temporarily delayed the demolition, but the building was demolished in April 2023.

== Geography ==
According to the 2010 census, Rock Island has a total area of 17.872 square miles (46.29 km^{2}), of which 16.85 square miles (43.64 km^{2}) (or 94.28%) is land and 1.022 square miles (2.65 km^{2}) (5.72%) is water.

=== Climate ===
Rock Island

Climate chart (precipitation, max. and min. temperature)
J	F	M	A	M	J	J	A	S	O	N	D
2 27 16	3.4 30 16	2 46 27	5.8 61 43	7.2 73 55	5.9 81 64	1.8 86 68	3.2 84 66	3.7 75 59	3.9 64 45	1.9 52 36	2 28 19
- █ Average max. and min. temperatures in °F
- █ Precipitation totals in inches
Metric conversion
J	F	M	A	M	J	J	A	S	O	N	D
51 −3 −9	86 −1 −9	51 8 −3	147 16 6	183 23 13	150 27 18	46 30 20	81 29 19	94 24 15	99 18 7	48 11 2	51 −2 −7
- █ Average max. and min. temperatures in °C
- █ Precipitation totals in mm

== Demographics ==
Historical population
Census	Pop.	Note	%±
1850	1,711		—
1860	5,130		199.8%
1870	7,890		53.8%
1880	11,659		47.8%
1890	13,634		16.9%
1900	19,493		43.0%
1910	24,335		24.8%
1920	35,177		44.6%
1930	37,953		7.9%
1940	42,775		12.7%
1950	48,710		13.9%
1960	51,863		6.5%
1970	50,166		−3.3%
1980	46,821		−6.7%
1990	40,552		−13.4%
2000	39,684		−2.1%
2010	39,018		−1.7%
2020	37,108		−4.9%
2022 (est.)	36,256		−2.3%
U.S. Decennial Census; 2010 2020

=== Racial and ethnic composition ===
Rock Island, Illinois – Racial and ethnic composition Note: the US Census treats Hispanic/Latino as an ethnic category. This table excludes Latinos from the racial categories and assigns them to a separate category. Hispanics/Latinos may be of any race.
Race / Ethnicity (NH = Non-Hispanic)	Pop 2000	Pop 2010	Pop 2020	% 2000	% 2010	% 2020
White alone (NH)	29,485	26,464	21,910	74.30%	67.83%	59.04%
Black or African American alone (NH)	6,741	6,987	7,135	16.99%	17.91%	19.23%
Native American or Alaska Native alone (NH)	87	84	63	0.22%	0.22%	0.17%
Asian alone (NH)	290	680	1,603	0.73%	1.74%	4.32%
Native Hawaiian or Pacific Islander alone (NH)	17	8	12	0.04%	0.02%	0.03%
Other race alone (NH)	53	66	160	0.13%	0.17%	0.43%
Mixed race or Multiracial (NH)	670	1,065	1,928	1.69%	2.73%	5.20%
Hispanic or Latino (any race)	2,341	3,664	4,297	5.90%	9.39%	11.58%
Total	39,684	39,018	37,108	100.00%	100.00%	100.00%

=== 2020 census ===
As of the 2020 census, Rock Island had a population of 37,108. The median age was 37.6 years. 22.2% of residents were under the age of 18 and 17.9% of residents were 65 years of age or older. For every 100 females there were 93.7 males, and for every 100 females age 18 and over there were 90.7 males age 18 and over.

99.5% of residents lived in urban areas, while 0.5% lived in rural areas.

There were 15,180 households in Rock Island, of which 27.5% had children under the age of 18 living in them. Of all households, 35.6% were married-couple households, 22.5% were households with a male householder and no spouse or partner present, and 34.3% were households with a female householder and no spouse or partner present. About 36.3% of all households were made up of individuals and 14.8% had someone living alone who was 65 years of age or older.

There were 17,085 housing units, of which 11.2% were vacant. The homeowner vacancy rate was 2.9% and the rental vacancy rate was 11.8%.

Racial composition as of the 2020 census
Race	Number	Percent
White	22,966	61.9%
Black or African American	7,289	19.6%
American Indian and Alaska Native	146	0.4%
Asian	1,612	4.3%
Native Hawaiian and Other Pacific Islander	19	0.1%
Some other race	1,610	4.3%
Two or more races	3,466	9.3%
Hispanic or Latino (of any race)	4,297	11.6%

=== 2000 census ===
As of the 2000 Census, there were 39,684 people, 16,148 households, and 9,543 families residing in the city. The population density was 2,492.0 inhabitants per square mile (962.2/km^{2}). There were 17,542 housing units at an average density of 1,101.6 per square mile (425.3/km^{2}). The racial makeup of the city was 77.13% White, 17.17% African American, 0.28% Native American, 0.75% Asian, 0.07% Pacific Islander, 2.41% from other races, and 2.19% from two or more races. Hispanic or Latino of any race were 5.90% of the population.

There were 16,148 households, out of which 26.4% had children under the age of 18 living with them, 41.2% were married couples living together, 14.2% had a female householder with no husband present, and 40.9% were non-families. 34.5% of all households were made up of individuals, and 14.3% had someone living alone who was 65 years of age or older. The average household size was 2.31 and the average family size was 2.97.

The city's population was spread out, with 23.0% under the age of 18, 13.1% from 18 to 24, 25.7% from 25 to 44, 21.9% from 45 to 64, and 16.3% who were 65 years of age or older. The median age was 36 years. For every 100 females, there were 89.5 males. For every 100 females age 18 and over, there were 86.1 males.

The median income for a household in the city was $34,729, and the median income for a family was $45,127. Males had a median income of $32,815 versus $23,378 for females. The per capita income for the city was $19,202. About 10.9% of families and 14.5% of the population were below the poverty line, including 22.5% of those under age 18 and 8.4% of those age 65 or over.

=== Ethnic communities ===
Per the 2022 American Community Survey five-year estimates, the Burmese American population was 902 comprising 50% of the Asian population (estimated at 1,835).

== Economy ==
According to the city's 2017 Comprehensive Annual Financial Report, the largest employers in the city are:

#	Employer	# of Employees
1	Rock Island Arsenal	6,301
2	Trinity Rock Island	1,848
3	Rock Island–Milan School District 41	1,292
4	Rock Island County	733
5	Jumer's Casino & Hotel	550
6	Augustana College	550
7	Pfg Tpc Roma Foods	530
8	City of Rock Island	436
9	Modern Woodmen of America	435
10	Honeywell Safety Products	400

Rock Island Arsenal was established in 1862 by the U.S. Army and is listed as a National Historic Landmark.

== Arts and culture ==
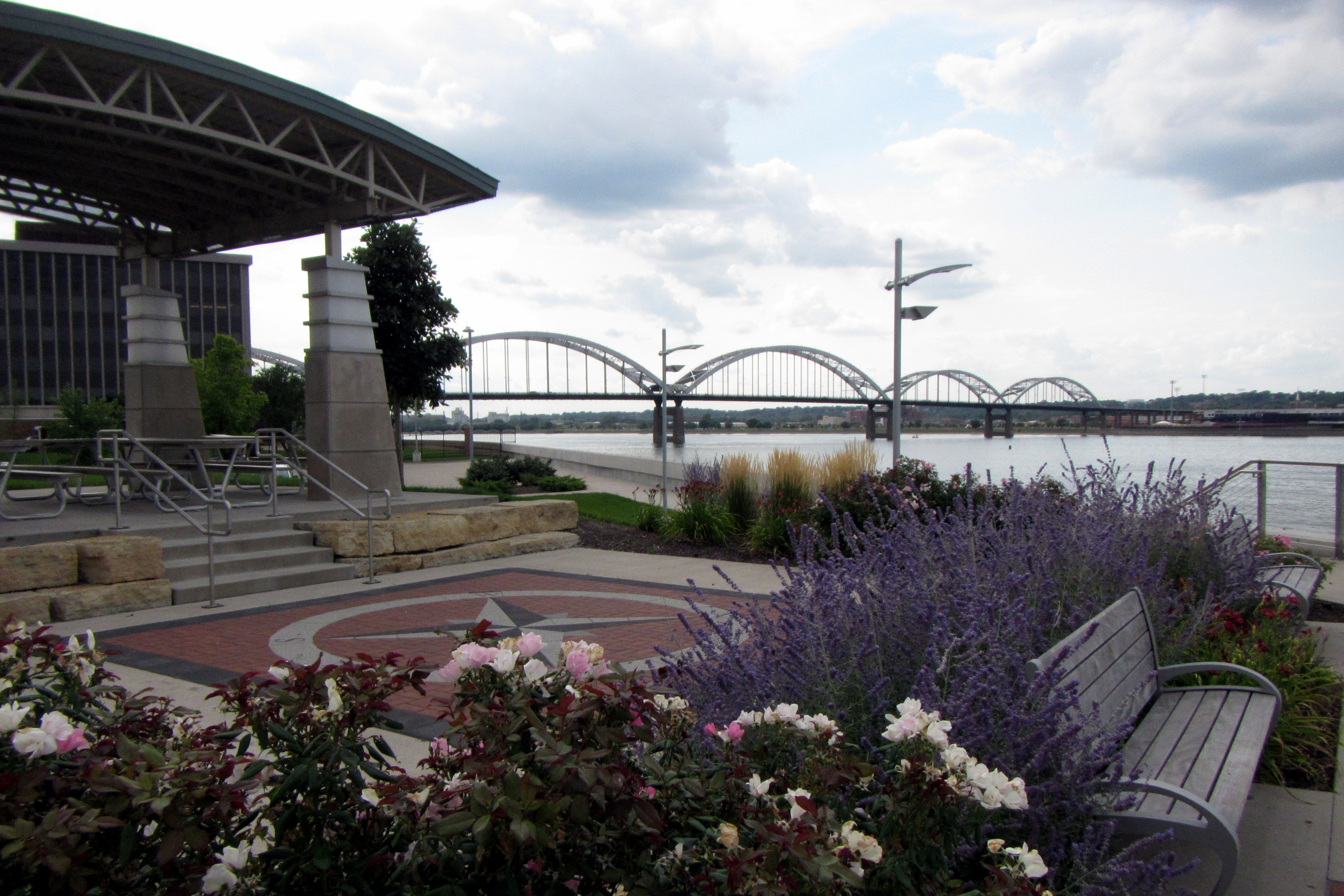
Schwiebert Riverfront Park

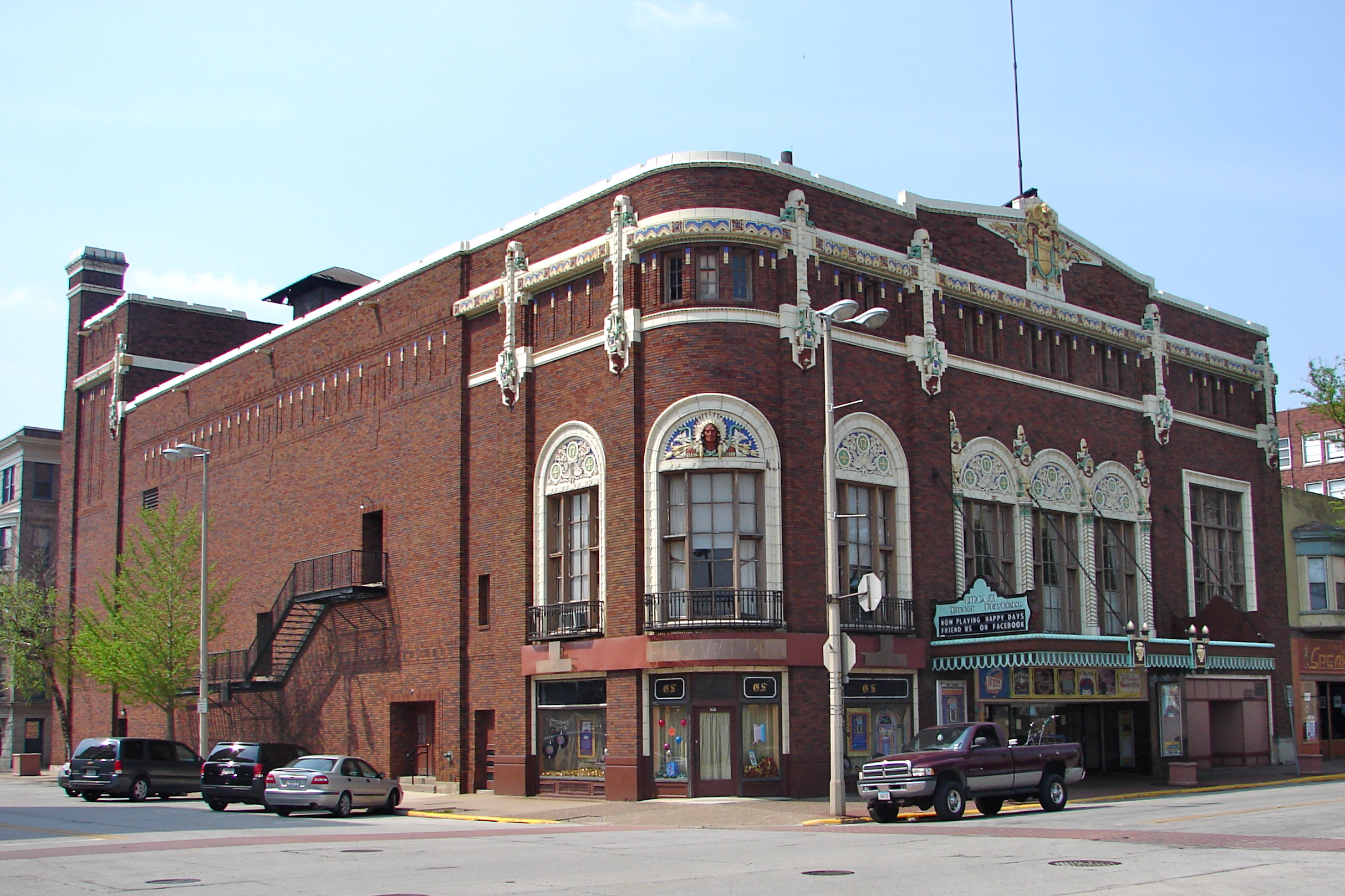
Fort Armstrong Theatre

The Denkmann-Hauberg House is a historic site in the city, which includes a community events space. Bally's Quad Cities Casino & Hotel is located along the Mississippi River and is among the largest casinos in Illinois.

The Black Hawk State Historic Site along the Rock River preserves the site of a 19th-century settlement and offers educational programs related to the area's indigenous and colonial history. The Broadway Historic District is a designated neighborhood that features a collection of well-preserved late 19th- and early 20th-century buildings. Chippiannock Cemetery was established in 1854 and is one of the oldest cemeteries in the area.

Longview Park Conservatory and Gardens is a botanical garden within Longview Park that houses a wide variety of plant species and offers educational programs. The Quad City Botanical Center is an indoor-outdoor facility dedicated to horticultural education and exhibits.

The Rock Island Public Library was established in 1872.

Rock Island is the site of the Quad City Hindu Temple, a Hindu shrine dedicated chiefly to the deity Venkateswara. The temple opened in 2007.

=== Cultural organizations ===
- Ballet Quad Cities
- Genesius Guild
- The Quad City Symphony Orchestra plays part of its Masterworks Series' concerts at Centennial Hall on the Augustana College campus.
- Quad City Arts

== Sports ==
The first football game in what was to become the National Football League was played at Rock Island's Douglas Park in September 1920. It was hosted by the Rock Island Independents (1907–1926), who were a charter NFL franchise in 1920.

The Rock Island Islanders were a minor league baseball team that played for 37 seasons between 1901 and 1948. The Islanders played at Douglas Park and were affiliates of the Cincinnati Reds and Philadelphia A's.

Karters flock to Rock Island every year for the prestigious "Rock Island Grand Prix" on Labor Day weekend, which attracts competitors from across the United States and the world. With exception to 1997, when the annual race was canceled due to legal liability issues, the Rock Island Grand Prix has been held every year since 1994.

== Education ==
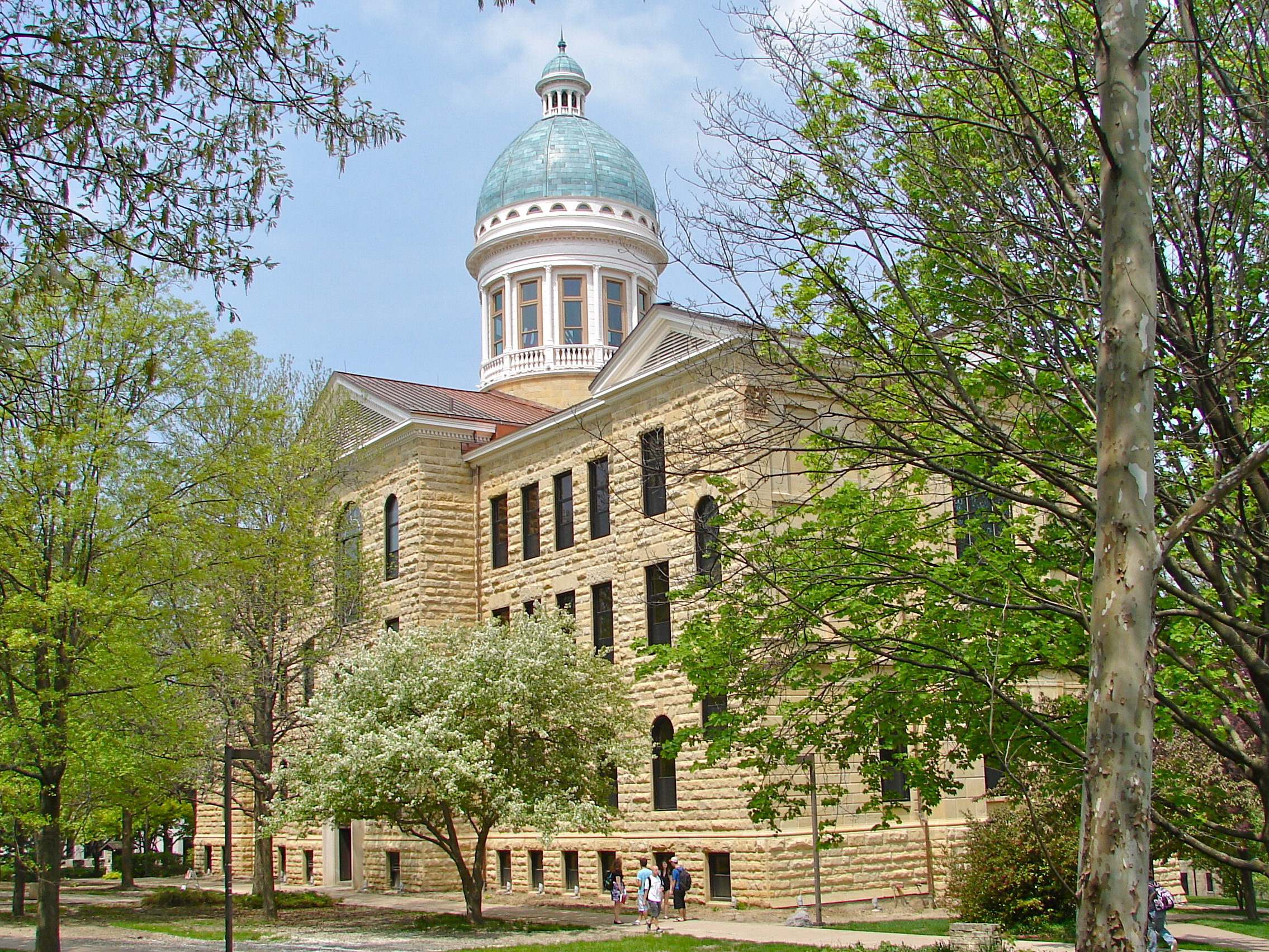
Augustana College

The majority of the city is served by the Rock Island–Milan School District 41, which operates 13 public schools, including Rock Island High School. Portions of the southwest area fall under the Rockridge School District, including Rockridge High School. Small portions of Rock Island are in the Rockridge Community Unit School District 300. Several private schools also serve Rock Island, including Jordan Catholic Elementary School and Alleman Catholic High School.

In higher education, Augustana College is a private liberal arts college in the city which was founded in 1860. The city is also home to Bible Missionary Institute.

== Media ==
Rock Island is the location of television station WHBF-TV. Until 1963, WHBF was one of only two television stations in the Quad Cities area. (The other is WOC-TV on the Iowa side of the river.) Rock Island was also the longtime former home of WHBF-TV's former sister radio stations, WHBF and WHBF-FM, although it does remain the licensed city of those stations.

National Public Radio member station WVIK is licensed to and located in Rock Island on the campus of Augustana College, and WGVV-LP, which is also licensed to the city of Rock Island.

Rock Island is the home base for NOAA Weather Radio WXJ-73, the Quad Cities' area NWR station, programmed by the National Weather Service in Davenport.

== Transportation ==
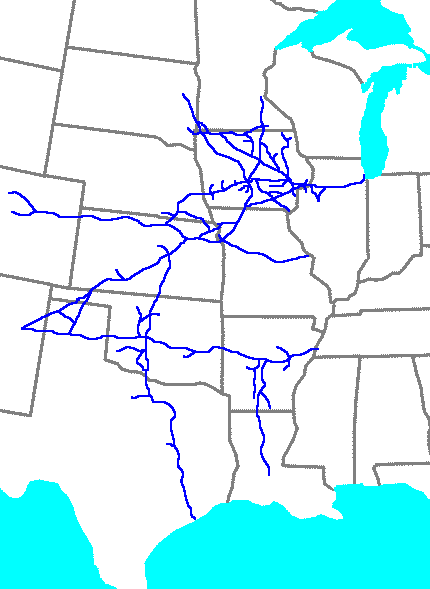
The Rock Island Line shipped goods from west of the Mississippi to Chicago. This map shows the railroad's extent in 1965.

Quad Cities MetroLINK provides bus service on numerous routes connecting Rock Island to destinations across the Quad Cities. District Station in downtown Rock Island serves as a hub of the system.

The first railroad bridge across the Mississippi River was built between Arsenal Island and Davenport in 1856. Many steamboat pilots felt that the bridge had been intentionally positioned to make it hard for them to navigate, and this conflict reflected a larger rivalry: St. Louis-based steamboat transit against Chicago-based railroad transit. Two weeks after the bridge opened, the steamboat Effie Afton collided with the bridge, caught fire, and damaged the bridge. The owner of the Effie Afton sued the bridge company for damages, and the case, Hurd v. Rock Island Bridge Co., featured Abraham Lincoln as one of the lawyers who defended the railroad at trial in September 1857. This test case was appealed to the United States Supreme Court, which ruled in favor of the railroad in 1862. Although the original bridge is long gone, having been replaced in 1866 with a heavier bridge, a monument exists on Arsenal Island marking the Illinois side. On the Iowa side, the bridge was located near where 4th and Federal streets intersect with River Drive.

The Lock and Dam No. 15 and the Government Bridge are located just southwest of the site of the first bridge. The Government Bridge, completed in 1896, is notable for having two sets of railroad tracks above the car lanes. There are only two bridges in the world with this feature. Three other bridges span the river between Rock Island and Davenport. The Crescent Rail Bridge is a railroad-only bridge, completed in 1899. The Centennial Bridge was completed in 1940 for autos only. The newest bridge is the Interstate 280 bridge, completed in 1973. Lock and Dam No. 15, completed in 1934 as a federal Works Progress Administration (WPA) project during the Great Depression, is the largest roller dam in the world.

On the south side of the city, overlooked by the Black Hawk State Historic Site, are auto and railroad crossings of the Rock River to Milan, Illinois. This set of bridges also crosses the historic Hennepin Canal and Sears Dam (this was named after the entrepreneur David B. Sears, who previously built the Sears Dam between Arsenal Island and Moline.) In 2007 a new bridge was completed between 3rd Street Moline/southeast Rock Island and Milan.

== Notable people ==
- David Ackles, singer-songwriter, pianist, and child actor
- Eddie Albert, Oscar-nominated actor and activist
- Black Hawk, leader and warrior of the Sauk American Indian tribe
- Ken Bowman, Ken Duncan and Herm Schneidman, players for NFL's Green Bay Packers
- John Buford, Civil war general
- George Davenport, American frontiersman, U.S. Army soldier, and Indian agent
- Steve Decker, catcher with various teams
- Frederick Denkmann, lumber mogul and partner of Friedrich Weyerhäuser
- Pony Diehl, Wild West outlaw
- Booker Edgerson, Buffalo Bills
- Lane Evans, former United States Congressman (Illinois 17th District); born in Rock Island
- Russell Farnham, one of the first settlers of the area, and a partner of George Davenport
- Therese Fowler, author of "Z" and other books.
- Virginia Frederick, Illinois state representative
- Alan Garber, President of Harvard University
- Daniel G. Garnsey, former U.S. Congressman
- Aaron H. Grout, Vermont Secretary of State
- June Haver, screen and radio actress
- Chase Hilgenbrinck, former professional soccer player
- Roger Imhof, actor and performer
- Jesse Johnson, guitarist for group "The Time"
- Mark Johnson, Olympic wrestler
- Charles Keller, former U.S. Army Brigadier General
- Madison Keys, professional tennis player
- Lou Kolls, MLB umpire
- Kari Lake, political candidate in Arizona
- Helen Mack, screen and stage actress
- Jerry Mansfield, NFL player
- Elisabeth Maurus (aka Lissie), folk-rock singer and songwriter
- Sherman McMaster, Wild West outlaw and lawman
- Tim Moore, stage, screen and television actor
- Don Nelson, forward and head coach with several NBA teams
- Greg Norton, former bassist of the hardcore punk band Hüsker Dü
- Gary Payton, astronaut
- Chasson Randle, basketball player at Stanford
- Paul E. Rink, Illinois judge and politician
- Harry Sage, catcher with the Toledo Maumees
- Bobby Schilling, U.S. Congressman from Illinois's 17th congressional district
- Dred Scott, American slave who sued for his freedom
- J. Clinton Searle, Illinois state representative and lawyer
- Michael H. Sexton, Minor League Baseball executive
- Tom Sexton, shortstop with 19th century's Milwaukee Brewers
- Thomas P. Sinnett, Illinois politician and lawyer
- Charles A. Spring, Presbyterian leader and son of Samuel Spring
- Dan Stoneking, journalist and sports editor of the Minneapolis Star, president of the Professional Hockey Writers' Association
- Henry Strasak, FBI and CIA officer
- Lefty Taber, pitcher for the Philadelphia Phillies
- Hiram Truesdale, lawyer and jurist
- Jonathan Tweet, game designer and author
- Samuel Rinnah Van Sant, Civil War soldier, Governor of Minnesota
- Henry Cantwell Wallace, U.S. Secretary of Agriculture 1921–24
- Friedrich Weyerhäuser, lumber mogul
- Bill Zies, catcher with the St. Louis Cardinals
- Lester Ziffren, journalist and Hollywood screenwriter

== In popular culture ==
- Rock Island Trail (1950), starring Forrest Tucker, was a Republic Studios production related to the building of the Rock Island Railroad across the Mississippi River.

== See also ==
- Mayor of Rock Island, Illinois
- List of crossings of the Upper Mississippi River
- List of tallest buildings in the Quad Cities
