= National Register of Historic Places listings in Rock Island County, Illinois =

Location of Rock Island County in Illinois

This is a list of the National Register of Historic Places listings in Rock Island County, Illinois.

This is intended to be a complete list of the properties and districts on the National Register of Historic Places in Rock Island County, Illinois, United States. Latitude and longitude coordinates are provided for many National Register properties and districts; these locations may be seen together in a map.

There are 29 properties and districts listed on the National Register in the county, including 1 National Historic Landmark. Another five properties were once listed, but have since been removed.

This National Park Service list is complete through NPS recent listings posted August 1, 2025.

== Current listings ==
	Name on the Register	Image	Date listed	Location	City or town	Description
1	Arsenal Courts Historic District	Arsenal Courts Historic District	January 6, 2020 (#100004851)	1400 Fifth St. 41°29′50″N 90°35′30″W	Rock Island	Apartment complex built between 1940 and 1941 by the United States Housing Administration to house defense workers at the Rock Island Arsenal.
2	Best Building	Best Building	July 17, 2018 (#100002328)	1701-03 2nd Ave. 41°30′40″N 90°34′33″W	Rock Island	Renaissance Revival commervcial building constructed in 1908.
3	Black Hawk Museum and Lodge	Black Hawk Museum and Lodge	March 4, 1985 (#85002402)	1510 46th Ave. 41°27′51″N 90°34′21″W	Rock Island	Colonial Revival building that was built as a lodge in a state park. It currently houses the Hauberg Museum.
4	Black's Store	Black's Store	May 28, 1976 (#76000727)	1st Ave. 41°33′25″N 90°24′51″W	Hampton	The largest mercantile store in northwestern Illinois when it opened in the 1840s. The building housed the area's first elevator.
5	Broadway Historic District	Broadway Historic District	August 14, 1998 (#98001046)	Roughly bounded by 17th and 23rd Sts., 5th and 7th Aves., Lincoln Court, and 12th and 13th Aves. 41°30′08″N 90°34′18″W	Rock Island	Historic district with more than 550 Victorian homes and other buildings.
6	Chippiannock Cemetery	Chippiannock Cemetery	May 6, 1994 (#94000437)	2901 12th St. 41°28′54″N 90°34′40″W	Rock Island	Almerin Hotchkiss patterned his design on the Rural Cemetery style of Mt. Auburn Cemetery in Massachusetts. It contains monuments by Alexander Stirling Calder and Paul de Vigne.
7	Connor House	Connor House	August 11, 1988 (#88001227)	702 20th St. 41°30′18″N 90°34′19″W	Rock Island	An early example of the Queen Anne style in Rock Island. The home is located in the Broadway Historic District.
8	John Deere House	John Deere House	February 5, 2003 (#02001756)	1217 11th Ave. 41°30′06″N 90°31′10″W	Moline	The last home owned by inventor and industrialist John Deere. It was built in the Second Empire style.
9	Denkmann-Hauberg House	Denkmann-Hauberg House	December 26, 1972 (#72000466)	1300 24th St. 41°29′33″N 90°34′24″W	Rock Island	Prairie School style home designed by Robert C. Spencer. Home to philanthropists John and Susanne (Denkmann) Hauberg
10	Downtown Rock Island Historic District	Downtown Rock Island Historic District	March 13, 2020 (#100004433)	Roughly bound by Iowa terminus of the Centennial Bridge a West 2nd St. Davenport, IA, 21st St., 15th St., and 5th Ave. 41°30′36″N 90°34′29″W	Rock Island	Rock Island's Central Business District, which includes the Centennial Bridge that extends across the Mississippi River into Davenport, Iowa.
11	Fort Armstrong Hotel	Fort Armstrong Hotel	November 13, 1984 (#84000327)	3rd Ave. and 19th St. 41°30′34″N 90°34′23″W	Rock Island	Renaissance Revival luxury hotel from the 1920s.
12	Fort Armstrong Theatre	Fort Armstrong Theatre	May 23, 1980 (#80001407)	1826 3rd Ave. 41°30′36″N 90°34′18″W	Rock Island	Art Deco movie palace that opened in 1920.
13	Garfield Elementary School	Garfield Elementary School	April 10, 2017 (#100000848)	1518 25th Ave. 41°29′14″N 90°30′53″W	Moline	Neoclassical school building completed in 1902 that is being converted into apartments.
14	LeClaire Hotel	LeClaire Hotel	February 4, 1994 (#94000025)	Junction of 19th St. and 5th Ave. 41°30′31″N 90°30′41″W	Moline	Fifteen-story Renaissance Revival and Commercial-style hotel that opened in 1915. It was the tallest building in the Quad Cities when it opened.
15	Lock and Dam No. 15 Historic District	Lock and Dam No. 15 Historic District	March 10, 2004 (#04000175)	Northwest of Rodman Ave., Twd., on the northwestern tip of Arsenal Island; 41°31′04″N 90°33′58″W	Rock Island	The largest roller dam in the world.
16	Lock and Dam No. 16 Historic District	Lock and Dam No. 16 Historic District	March 10, 2004 (#04000176)	33109 102nd Ave., W. 41°25′46″N 91°00′42″W	Muscatine	Extends into Muscatine County, Iowa.
17	Moline Downtown Commercial Historic District	Moline Downtown Commercial Historic District	August 30, 2007 (#07000856)	Roughly bounded by 12th St. to 18th St., 4th Ave. to 7th Ave. 41°30′25″N 90°30′55″W	Moline	Thirty-three-acre section of the Central Business District in Moline. One hundred buildings contribute to its historical significance.
18	Old Main, Augustana College	Old Main, Augustana College	September 11, 1975 (#75000673)	7th Ave. between 35th and 38th Sts. 41°30′15″N 90°32′58″W	Rock Island	Renaissance Revival building on the campus of Augustana College. It was built from 1884-1893.
19	Peoples National Bank Building-Fries Building	Peoples National Bank Building-Fries Building	November 22, 1999 (#99001381)	1729-1731 and 1723-1727 2nd Ave. 41°30′39″N 90°34′30″W	Rock Island	Two adjoining commercial buildings in downtown Rock Island. Both were built in the Classical Revival style in the late 19th century.
20	Potter House	Potter House	May 5, 1989 (#89000364)	1906 7th Ave. 41°30′18″N 90°34′25″W	Rock Island	Colonial Revival residence of newspaper owner Minnie Potter. It is located in the Broadway Historic District.
21	Rock Island Arsenal	Rock Island Arsenal	September 30, 1969 (#69000057)	Rock Island in the Mississippi River; 41°30′58″N 90°32′21″W	Rock Island	Originally the site of Fort Armstrong, it is now the largest government-owned weapons manufacturing arsenal in the United States. Located on an island in the Mississippi River, it served as a prison camp during the American Civil War.
22	Rock Island Lines Passenger Station	Rock Island Lines Passenger Station	June 3, 1982 (#82002596)	3029 5th Ave. 41°30′29″N 90°33′20″W	Rock Island	A Renaissance Revival style train depot that opened in 1901 and closed in 1980. It now serves as a banquet hall.
23	Rock Island National Cemetery	Rock Island National Cemetery	June 13, 1997 (#97000560)	0.25 miles north of the southern tip of Rock Island; 41°30′46″N 90°31′32″W	Rock Island	Established as a national cemetery in 1863 during the Civil War. It also contains a separate cemetery for the Confederate prisoners of war who were held on the island.
24	Sala Apartment Building	Sala Apartment Building	August 21, 2003 (#03000782)	320-330 19th St. 41°30′32″N 90°34′24″W	Rock Island	Renaissance Revival apartment building built in two sections in 1903 and 1913.
25	Skelly Service Station	Skelly Service Station	August 14, 2024 (#100010701)	820 5th Ave; 41°30′15″N 90°31′32″W	Moline	
26	Stauduhar House	Stauduhar House	March 5, 1982 (#82002597)	1609 21st St. 41°29′43″N 90°34′15″W	Rock Island	Home of Rock Island architect George P. Stauduhar, which he designed in 1895.
27	United States Housing Corporation (U.S.H.C.) Historic District	United States Housing Corporation (U.S.H.C.) Historic District	August 19, 2024 (#100010709)	Unit 1: Roughly bounded by 16th Avenue on the north, 31st Street on the west, 18th Avenue on the south, and 33rd Street on the east. Unit 2: Roughly bounded by 14th Avenue on the north, 39th Street on the west, 18th Avenue on the south, and 1st Street on 41°29′40″N 90°33′21″W	Rock Island	
28	Robert Wagner House	Robert Wagner House	May 15, 1990 (#90000721)	904 23rd St. 41°30′08″N 90°34′05″W	Rock Island	Classical Revival home of a Rock Island brewer and banker. Built in 1904, it is located in the Broadway Historic District.
29	Weyerhaeuser House	Weyerhaeuser House	September 11, 1975 (#75000674)	3052 10th Ave. 41°30′05″N 90°33′19″W	Rock Island	Rock Island home of lumber baron Frederick Weyerhaeuser. He bought the house in 1865 and extensively renovated it 1882-1883 in the Second Empire style.

== Former listings ==
	Name on the Register	Image	Date listed	Date removed	Location	City or town	Description
1	Joseph Huntoon Homestead		May 5, 1978 (#78001182)	September 5, 1986	821 16th St.	Moline	Demolished in 1986.
2	Industrial Home No. 94		November 28, 1978 (#79000866)	May 5, 1981	2100 3rd Ave.	Rock Island	Destroyed by fire, December 19, 1980.
3	Lincoln School	Lincoln School	August 29, 1985 (#85001910)	January 2, 2020	7th Ave. and 22nd St. 41°30′20″N 90°34′09″W	Rock Island	Romanesque Revival school building designed by E.S. Hammatt. It opened in 1893 and ceased being used as a school in 1980. It was located in the Broadway Historic District. It was demolished in 2012.
4	General Thomas Rodman House		October 3, 1978 (#78001183)	March 16, 1987	2532 8½ Ave.	Rock Island	Destroyed by fire, November 7, 1986.
5	Villa de Chantal Historic District	Villa de Chantal Historic District	May 22, 2005 (#05000432)	August 28, 2012	2101 16th Ave. 41°29′55″N 90°34′13″W	Rock Island	Former Catholic girls school that opened in this location in 1901. Most of the main building was destroyed in a fire in 2005.

== See also ==
- List of National Historic Landmarks in Illinois
- National Register of Historic Places listings in Illinois
