= Weyerhaeuser (disambiguation) =

Weyerhaeuser is one of the world's largest private owners of timberlands.

Weyerhaeuser may also refer to:

== Companies ==
- Weyerhaeuser Real Estate Company, based in Federal Way, Washington
- Weyerhaeuser Mortgage Company, based in Woodland Hills, California
- Weyerhaeuser Steamship Company, based in Tacoma, Washington

== People ==
- Friedrich Weyerhäuser (1834–1914), German–American timber mogul and founder of Weyerhaeuser
- George Weyerhaeuser kidnapping, the 1935 abduction of a great-grandson of Friedrich Weyerhäuser

== Places ==
- Weyerhaeuser, Wisconsin, a village in the United States
- Weyerhaeuser Glacier, in Antarctica

== Structures ==
- Charles A. Weyerhaeuser and Musser Houses, in Little Falls, Minnesota
- Weyerhaeuser Arena, in Port Alberni, British Columbia
- Weyerhaeuser House, in Rock Island, Illinois
- Weyerhaeuser King County Aquatic Center, in Federal Way, Washington
- Weyerhaeuser Office Building, in Everett, Washington
