= United States Housing Corporation Historic District =

United States Housing Corporation Historic District may refer to:

- United States Housing Corporation Historic District (New London, Connecticut)
- United States Housing Corporation Historic District (Rock Island, Illinois)
