= Denkmann-Hauberg House =

Historic house in Illinois, United States

- U.S. National Register of Historic Places
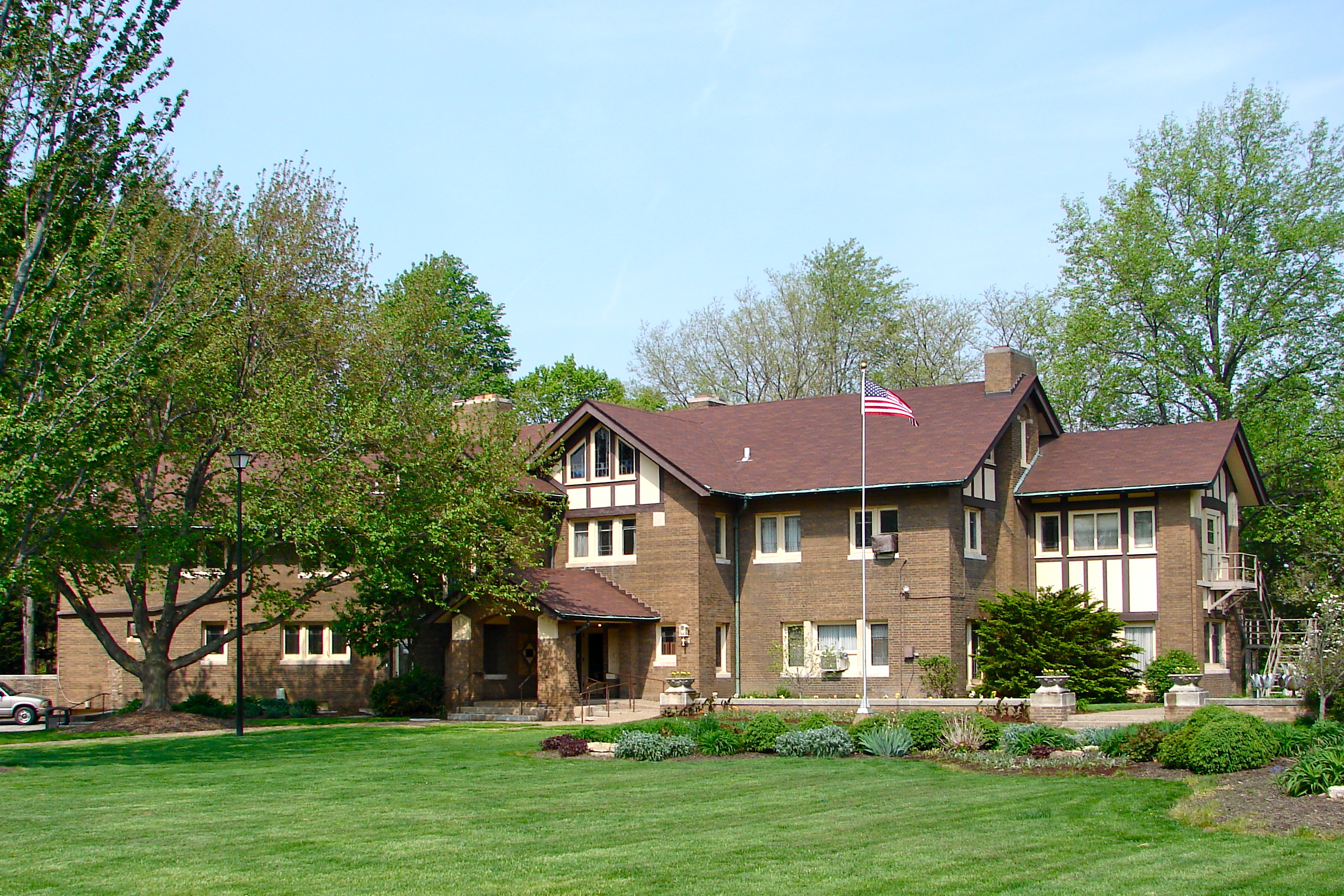

- Location within Illinois Location within the United States
- Location: 1300 24th St. Rock Island, Illinois
- Coordinates: 41°29′33″N 90°34′24″W
- Area: 10-acre (4.0 ha)
- Built: 1909-1911
- Architect: Robert C. Spencer; Jens Jensen
- Architectural style: Late 19th and early 20th century American Movements
- NRHP reference No.: 72000466
- Added to NRHP: December 26, 1972

The Denkmann-Hauberg House , also known as the Hauberg Estate, is a historic building located in Rock Island, Illinois, United States. It was listed on the National Register of Historic Places in 1972.

== History ==
The house was the home of Susanne Christine Denkmann and John Henry Hauberg, who were married in 1911 at her family home, on the corner of 2nd Street and 4th Avenue in Rock Island. After their honeymoon "out east" the couple returned and began their life in this new house. Susanne was an heiress and youngest daughter of Frederick Denkmann, who was a founding partner in the Weyerhaeuser-Denkmann Lumber Company. Her philanthropic activities included the establishment of the West End Settlement, which provided housing and aid for those in need, the Rock Island YWCA, and the Denkmann Memorial Library at Augustana College. John Henry Hauberg was a historian who helped to establish Black Hawk's Watch Tower as a state park in 1927. Much of his personal collection helped create the John Hauberg Museum of Native American Life at the park. Another one of his legacies was recording the oral histories of the area's pioneers. Their children donated the home in 1956 to the city of Rock Island to be used as the Hauberg Civic Center.

== Architecture ==
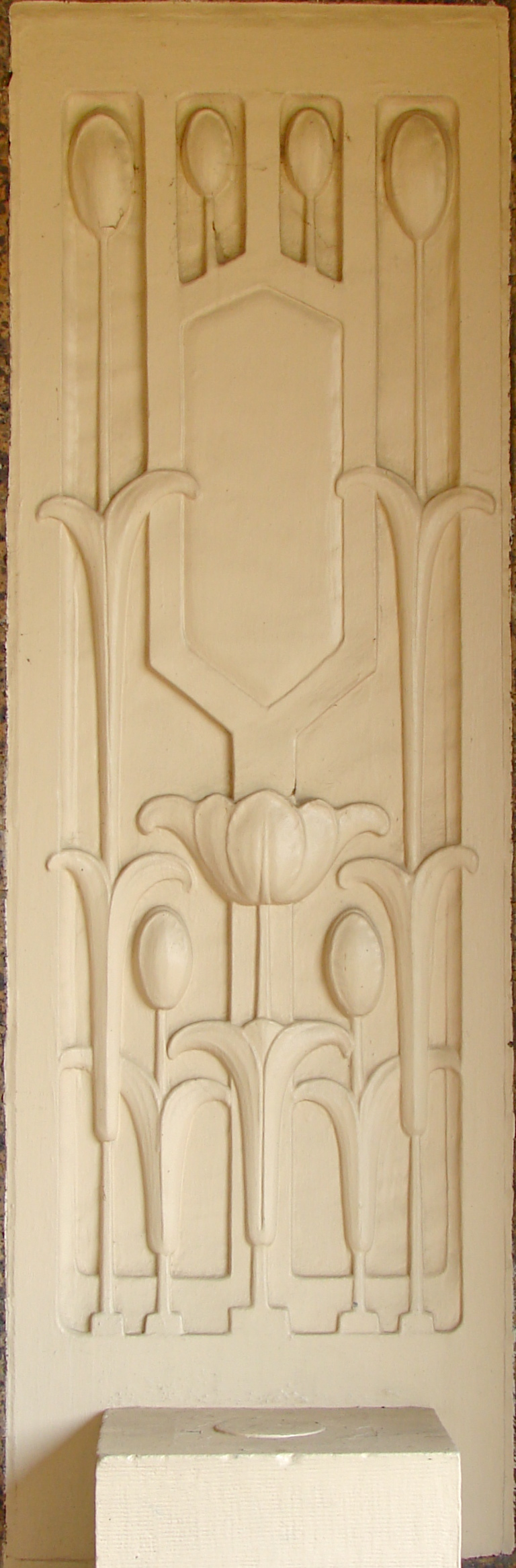
Stylized tulip in stone inset

The Prairie style home was designed by Robert C. Spencer, a contemporary of Frank Lloyd Wright. He was known for blending the more modern Prairie style with historical elements, such as the half-timbering that is found on this house. The tulip, which was Mrs. Hauberg's favorite flower, is featured stylistically throughout the exterior and interior of the structure. Spencer adapted the tulip to decorative elements such as stone insets, plaster molding, wood organ screens, fixtures and decorative tiles. Chicago landscape architect Jens Jensen laid out the 10-acre (4.0 ha) property to appear as a Wisconsin woodland. A winding path and stone bridge from Jensen's design remain on the west side of the house.
