= Chippiannock Cemetery =

Cemetery in Rock Island, Illinois, United States

- U.S. National Register of Historic Places
- U.S. Historic district
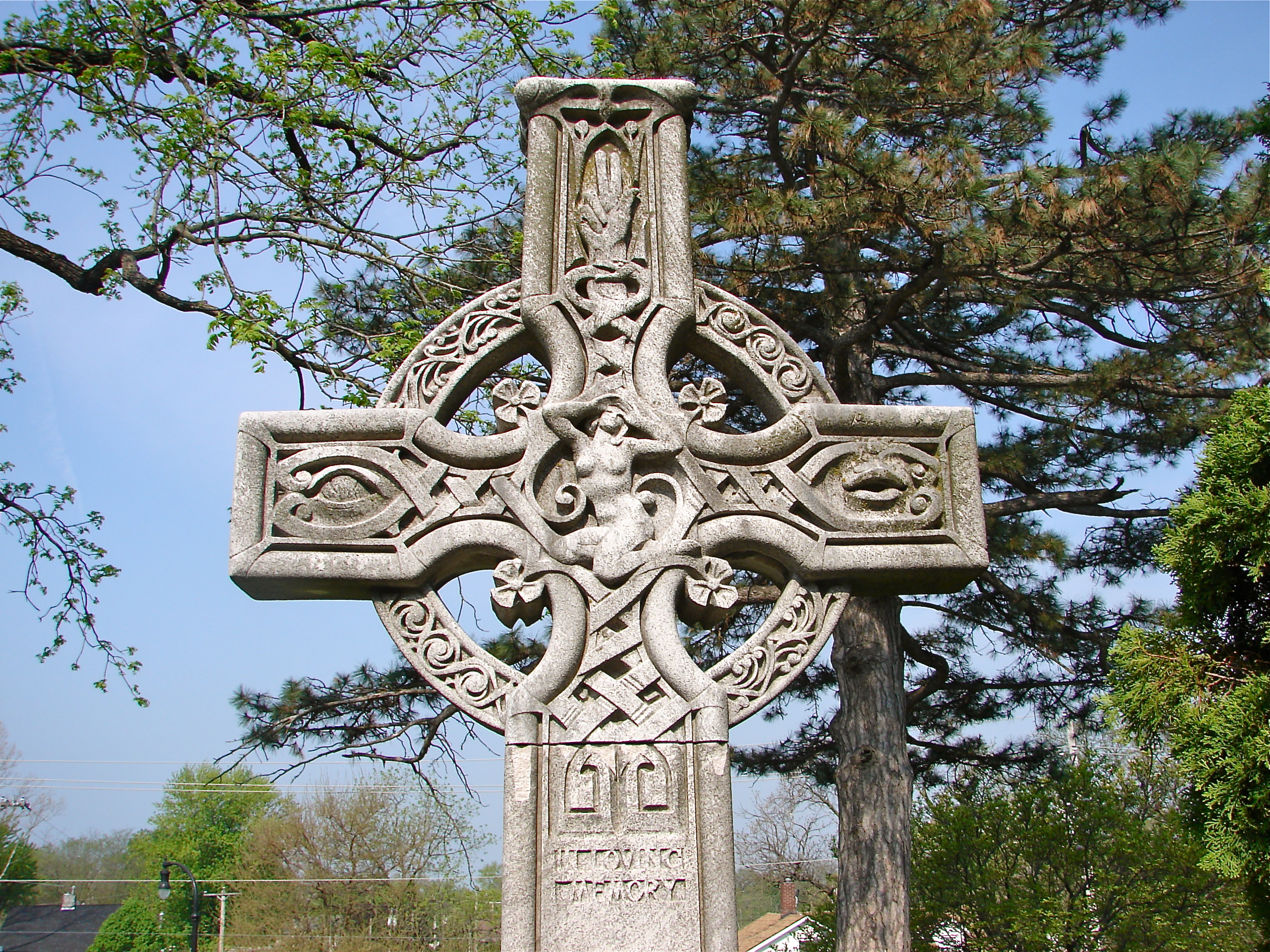
- Celtic Cross near entrance, designed by Alexander Stirling Calder

- Location within Illinois Location within the United States
- Location: 2901 Twelfth St. Rock Island, Illinois
- Coordinates: 41°28′54″N 90°34′40″W
- Area: 77 acres (31 ha)
- Built: 1850
- Architect: Almerin Hotchkiss
- Architectural style: Classical Revival; Late Gothic Revival
- NRHP reference No.: 94000437
- Added to NRHP: May 06, 1994

Chippiannock Cemetery is a rural cemetery located on 12th Street and 31st Avenue in Rock Island, Illinois, United States. The word “Chippiannock” is a Native American term which means “place of the dead”. It was listed on the National Register of Historic Places in 1994.

== History ==
Rock Island was in need of a permanent cemetery in 1854. The town's population was 5,000 and the dead were being buried somewhat haphazardly in Bailey Davenport's pasture, which is now Longview Park. The first board of directors of the Chippiannock Cemetery Association included Holmes Hakes, S.S. Guyer, William L. Lee, Bailey Davenport, and Henry A. Porter. In 1855 Chippiannock's founders purchased 62 acres (25 ha) on Manitou Ridge and secured the services of noted landscape architect Almerin Hotchkiss to design a cemetery patterned in the rural cemetery style of Mt. Auburn in Massachusetts (America's first garden-style cemetery). Almerin Hotchkiss also designed Green-Wood Cemetery in Brooklyn and Bellefontaine Cemetery in St. Louis.

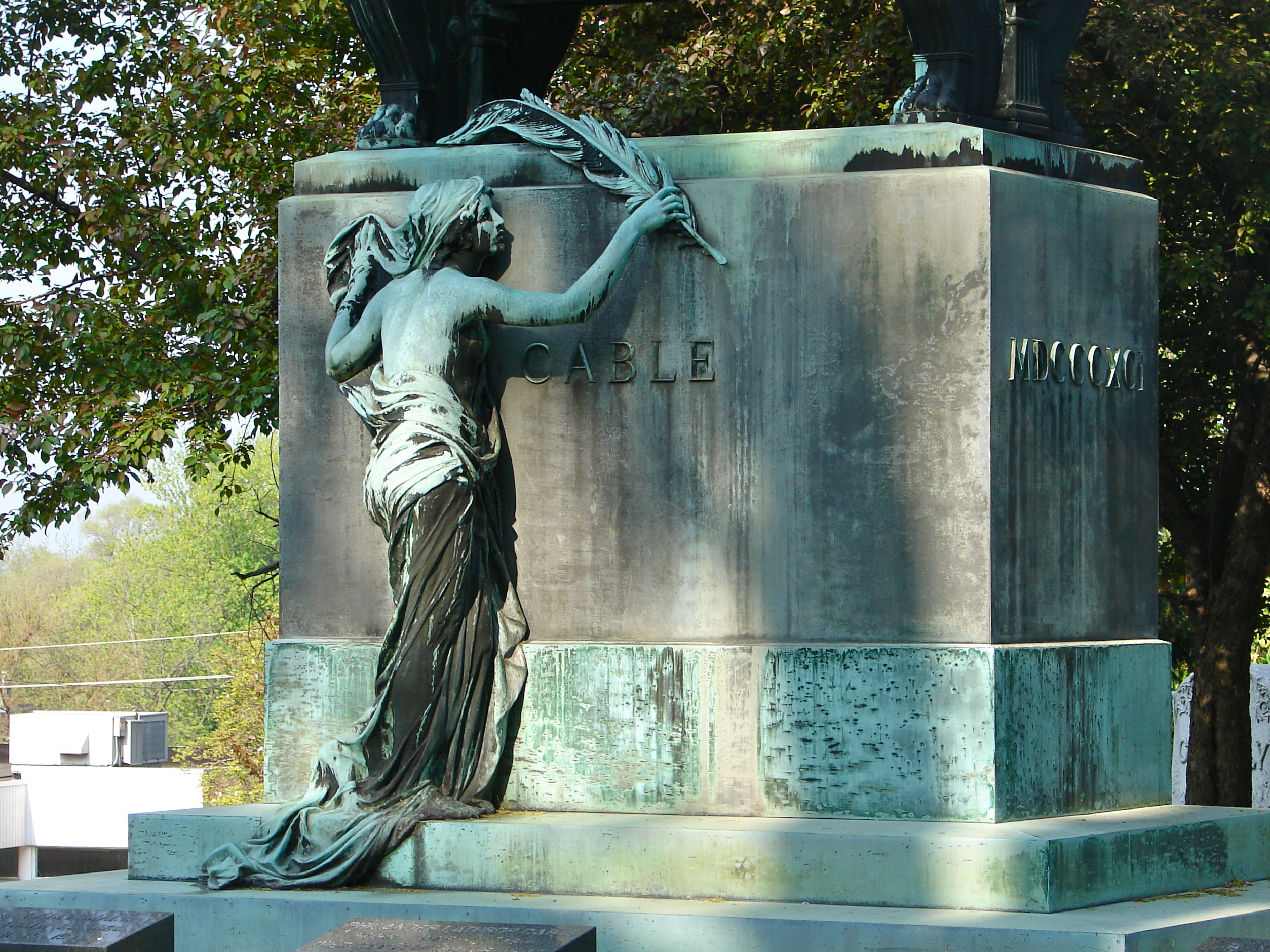
Cable monument by Paul de Vigne

The property consists of a western slope and the crest of Manitou Ridge. The site features gently rolling wooded hills that climb to a broad plateau. It is located near the midpoint between the Mississippi and Rock Rivers. Hotchkiss designed a system of curvilinear driveways winding around the various burial sections.

The cemetery includes impressive monuments by Alexander Stirling Calder and Paul de Vigne. Many of the monuments reflect attitudes about death and mourning from the Victorian Era. Some of the more memorable grave markers include life-size stone statues, a ship's anchor, a six-ton granite ball, a baby's cradle, the sleeping dog statue guarding the Dimick children, and the mourning woman at the Cable monument.

The Sexton's House is a Gothic Revival farmhouse that predates the cemetery. It continues to serve as the home of the cemetery superintendent. There are more than 25,000 people buried at Chippiannock Cemetery. The preservation of the cemetery is the responsibility of the Chippiannock Cemetery Heritage Foundation as well as other interested citizens.

Chippiannock was listed on the National Register of Historic Places on May 6, 1994. It was the first cemetery in Illinois to be listed on the National Register.

== Popular culture ==
It is an important location in Max Allan Collins' comic book Road to Perdition, which was the basis for the film of the same name, starring Tom Hanks and Paul Newman.

== Notable burials ==
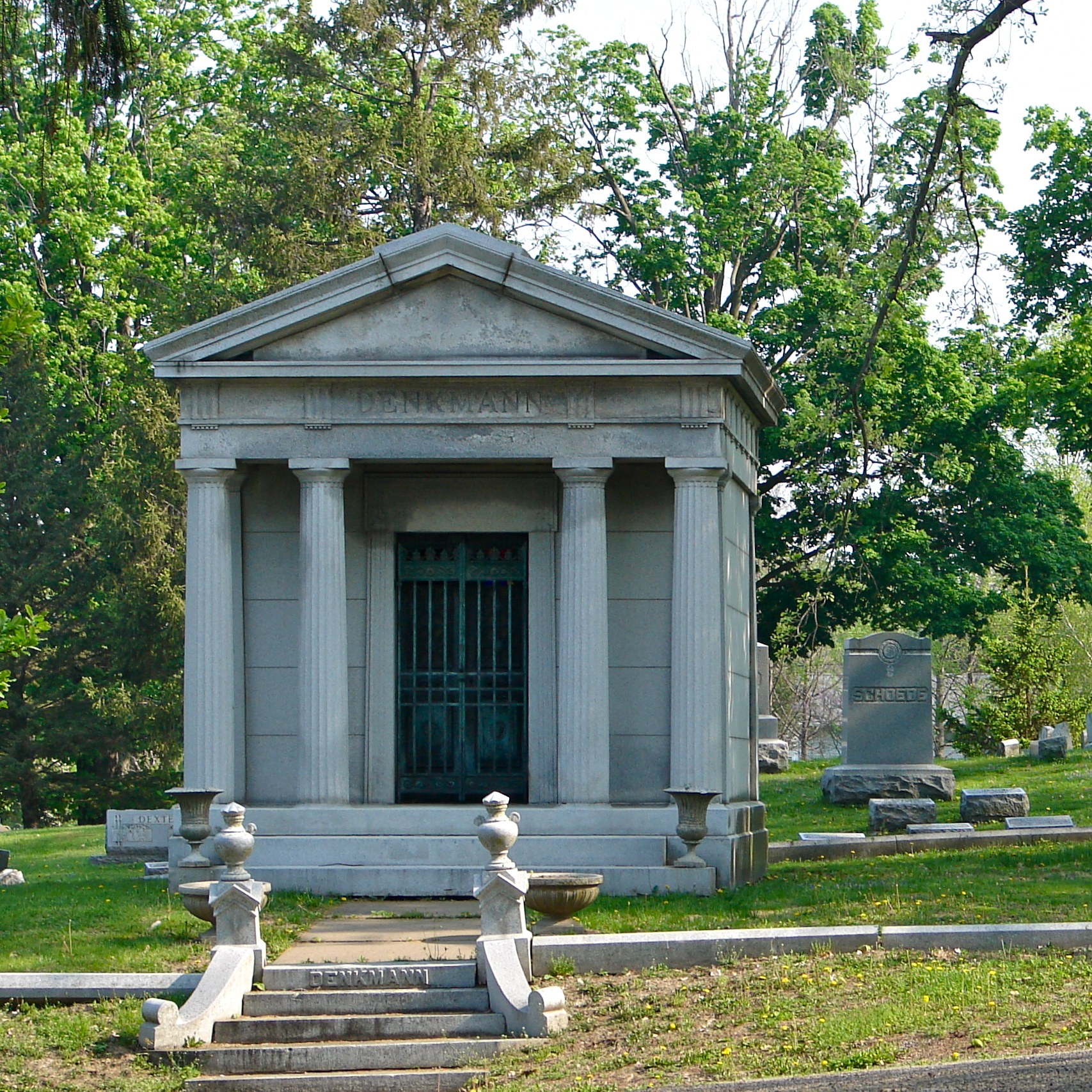
Denkmann Mausoleum

- Napoleon Bonaparte Buford (1807–1883), American Civil War Brigadier General
- Benjamin T. Cable (1853–1923), U.S. House of Representatives, 1891–93
- Ransom Reed Cable (1834–1909), president of the Chicago, Rock Island and Pacific Railroad
- George Davenport (1783–1845), one of the earliest settlers in Rock Island, developed what is now the Quad Cities, and namesake of Davenport, Iowa
- Frederick Denkmann (1824–1905), co-founded Weyerhauser-Denkmann Lumber Company with Frederick Weyerhauser
- William H. Gest (1838–1912), U.S. House of Representatives, 1887–91
- Ben Harper (1817–1887), businessman and mayor of Rock Island
- William Hoffman (1807–1884), American Civil War Brevet Major General
- Minnie Potter (1865–1936), president and CEO of the Argus, a daily newspaper
- Chester C. Thompson (1893–1971), mayor of Rock Island, U.S. House of Representatives, 1933–39
- Benjamin Dann Walsh (1808–1869), First Illinois State Entomologist
- Frederick Weyerhauser (1834–1914), founded the Weyerhauser Company
