= George Weyerhaeuser =

American timber executive (1926–2022)

- Born: George Hunt Walker Weyerhaeuser; July 8, 1926; Seattle, Washington, U.S.
- Died: June 11, 2022 (aged 95)
- Education: Yale University
- Occupation: Timber executive
- Relatives: Friedrich Weyerhäuser (great-grandfather)

George Hunt Walker Weyerhaeuser (July 8, 1926 – June 11, 2022) was an American timber executive who served as the head of Weyerhaeuser from 1966 to 1991.

== Early life and education ==
George Hunt Walker Weyerhaeuser was born on July 8, 1926 in Seattle. As the great-grandson of co-founder Frederick Weyerhaeuser, he was part of the fourth generation to manage the company.

In 1935, at the age of eight, George was kidnapped while returning home from school in Tacoma, Washington. The high-profile crime, which involved a ransom of $200,000, concluded with his release after eight days.

Weyerhaeuser served in the U.S. Navy during World War II. Later, he attended Yale University.

== Career ==
After graduation from Yale, he joined the family business, where he started in manual labor positions and progressed through the ranks.

In 1966, he became CEO of the company at age 39. Under his leadership, the company adopted innovative forestry practices, including the high-yield forestry model which involved intensive management practices like replanting, fertilization, and genetic improvement to increase timber production. These practices, while increasing productivity, also attracted criticism from environmental groups concerned with their impacts on natural ecosystems. Despite controversies, these methods significantly influenced forestry practices in the Pacific Northwest.

Weyerhaeuser also served on several boards, including those of Boeing, Safeco, the Federal Reserve Bank of San Francisco, the Rand Corporation, and Chevron. He supported the development of the Weyerhaeuser King County Aquatic Center, a key venue for the 1990 Seattle Goodwill Games.

He retired as CEO in 1991 and continued to serve as chairman of the board until 1999.

== See also ==
- List of kidnappings
- List of solved missing person cases (pre-1950)
