= Weyerhaeuser House =

Historic house in Illinois, United States

- U.S. National Register of Historic Places
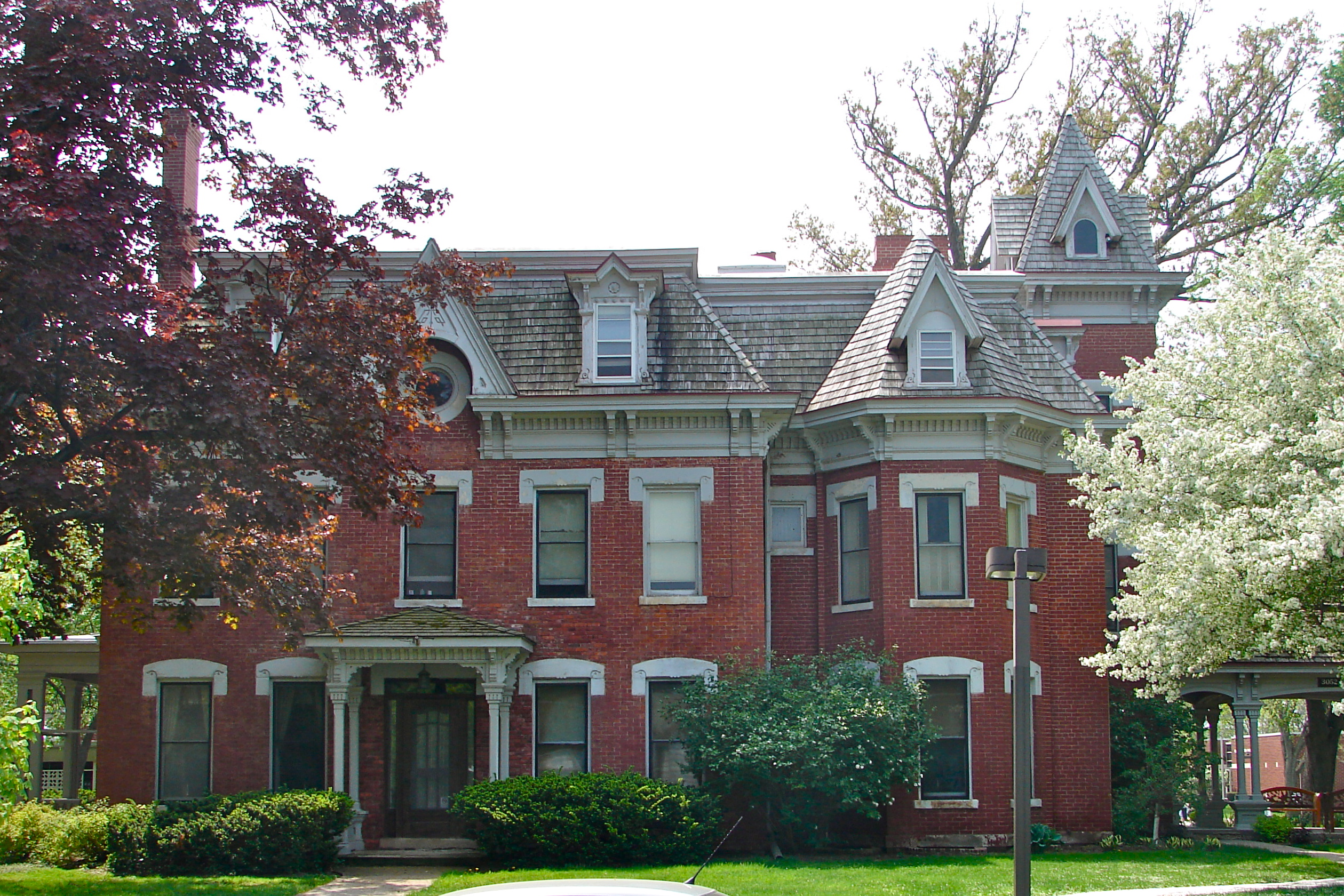

- Location within Illinois Location within the United States
- Location: 3052 10th Ave. Rock Island, Illinois
- Coordinates: 41°30′5″N 90°33′19″W
- Built: 1865
- Architect: John LaFarge
- Architectural style: Second Empire
- NRHP reference No.: 75000674
- Added to NRHP: September 11, 1975

The Weyerhaeuser House, also known as House on the Hill, is a building in Rock Island, Illinois, United States. It was built in 1865 and listed on the National Register of Historic Places in 1975. The home is now part of the Augustana College campus.

== History ==
Frederick Weyerhaeuser

Frederick Weyerhaeuser (1834–1914) was a native of Nieder-Saulheim, in the independent Grand Duchy of Hesse, in present-day Germany. He immigrated to the United States in 1856. Weyerhaeuser and his brother-in-law, Frederick Denkmann, founded the Weyerhaeuser and Denkmann Lumber Company in Rock Island. The company continues today as the Weyerhaeuser Company with its offices in Federal Way, Washington. As the company prospered Weyerhaeuser bought a house in 1865 and re-built it from 1882 to 1883. In 1900 Weyerhaeuser and fifteen partners bought 900,000 acres (3,600 km^{2}) of timberland in Washington state. The local partnership ended in 1905 when Denkmann died; Frederick Weyerhaeuser and his wife had moved to Washington by this time. He died in 1914 in Pasadena, California, and is buried in Chippiannock Cemetery in Rock Island. After Weyerhaeuser moved from the house his daughter Apollonia and her husband Samuel S. Davis lived in the house. They were leaders in industry, society, and philanthropy in the city of Rock Island.

The home remained in the Weyerhaeuser family for 85 years before it was donated to Augustana College in 1954. The first floor of the home is now used for entertaining college and community guests. Female students are housed in apartments on the second and third floors. The building is maintained by an endowment created by friends of the college, with support from descendants of the Weyerhaeuser family.

== Architecture ==
When Frederick Weyerhaeuser bought the house in 1865 it was a two-story brick structure with a square cupola. He had it rebuilt in 1882–1883 in the Second Empire style. Added to the original structure are the west entrance hall, additional rooms, bathrooms, and the third floor. The third floor features a mansard roof, and a tower room was built over the main entrance. A large tank on the third floor supplied water to the entire house. The dining room was enlarged and elaborate woodwork, carvings, and the John LaFarge stained glass window above the fireplace were added in 1888. It is the most elaborate Second Empire structure in Rock Island.
