= Stauduhar House =

Historic house in Illinois, United States

- U.S. National Register of Historic Places
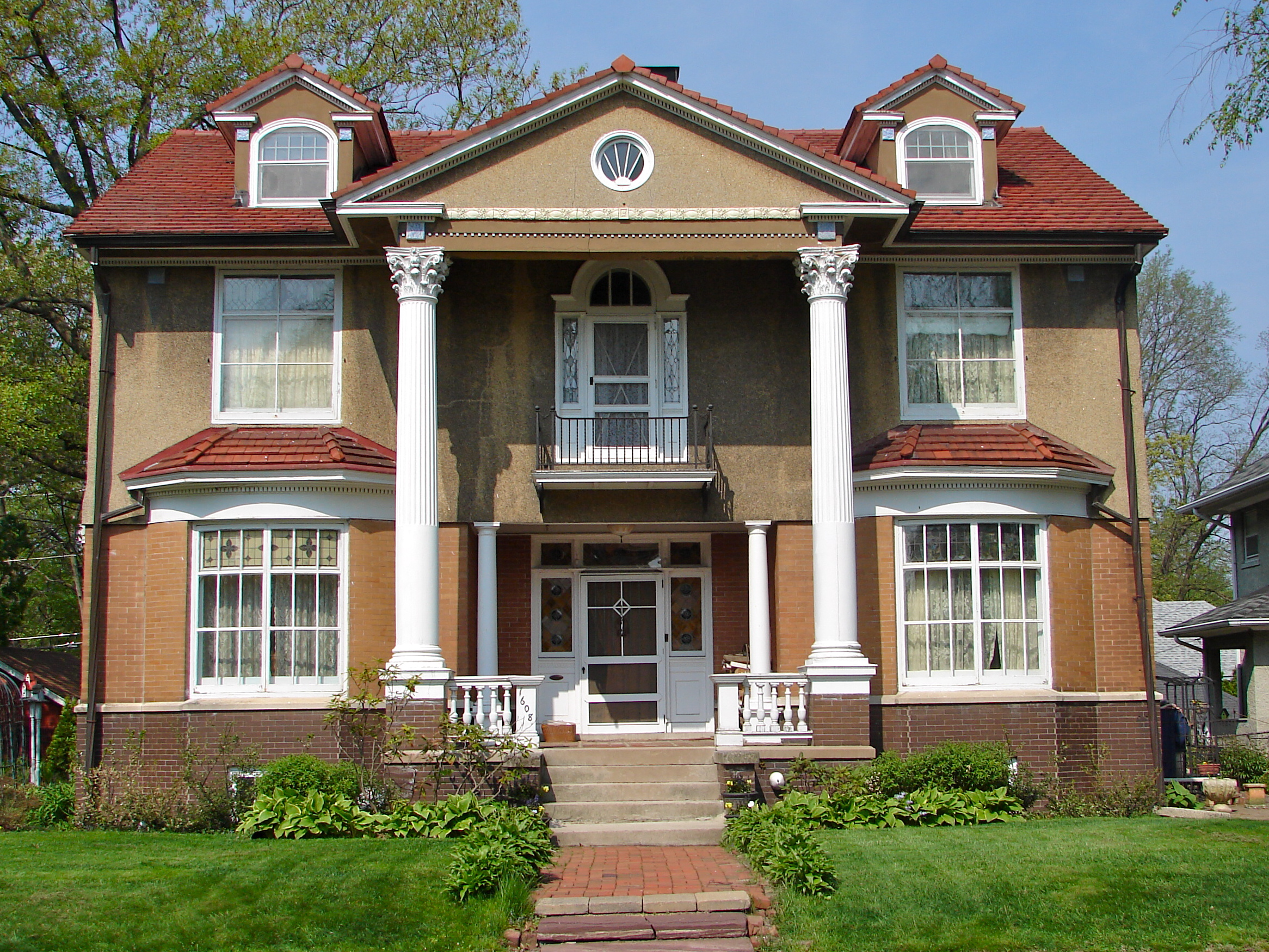

- Location within Illinois Location within the United States
- Location: 1608 21st St. Rock Island, Illinois
- Coordinates: 41°29′43″N 90°34′15″W
- Area: less than one acre
- Built: 1895
- Architect: George P. Stauduhar
- NRHP reference No.: 82002597
- Added to NRHP: March 5, 1982

The Stauduhar House is an historic building located in Rock Island, Illinois, United States. It was listed on the National Register of Historic Places in 1982. The house is in the Highland Park Historic District.

== George P. Stauduhar ==
George Stauduhar was a prolific architect based in Rock Island. He graduated with a degree in architecture from the University of Illinois in 1888. Stauduhar moved to Rock Island in 1890 to establish his practice, which ended with his death in 1928. He married Anna Elizabeth Farrell in 1891 and they raised eight children. The architectural practice was a family business. His sons assisted in the business arrangements and supervised the construction on the work-site. His oldest son, Charles, owned his own construction company and was his father's business partner. The Stauduhar daughters maintained the business's financial records and inventories. He died of heart failure in Valley City, North Dakota on September 23, 1928, while supervising the construction of a church. His son and business partner Charles died the next day in an automobile accident while on his way to make his father's funeral arrangements. While this brought an end to the family's architectural business, they continued to live in the house until 1975. George Stauduhar's architectural and personal papers were donated to the University of Illinois.

While Stauduhar designed a variety of buildings, he is most noted for his work for the Catholic Church. He designed over 200 churches in the Gothic Revival style in the upper Mississippi River Valley. Eight of his churches were built in Rock Island County. Stauduhar used classical architectural styles in his residential buildings that incorporated his love for the romantic. He liked to mix textures and various architectural details in the homes he designed. His own home exemplifies this tendency in his work. Stauduhar also designed commercial buildings and steamboat interiors.

A sample of George Stauduhar's designs in Rock Island includes:

- St. Mary's Rectory (1890)
- John Looney residence (1895)
- Kelly Residence (1895)
- Villa de Chantal (1900–1919)
- Sacred Heart Church (1901)
- Shields House (1904)
- Potter House (1907)
- West End Settlement (1907)
- Peoples National Bank remodel (1910)
- Math Residence (1911)
- Audubon School (1912)
- A.D. Huesing Bottling Plant and Garage (1912)
- Fire Station #5 (1914)
- Eagles Building (1914)
- Fire Station #6 (1916)
- Long View Park Chalet (1917)
- Ward residence (1918)

== Architecture ==
Stauduhar designed his own home in 1895 utilizing an eclectic style with Free Classic influences. It features a tile roof, a Classical pediment that sits on top of two-story columns, rounded bays, twisted copper downspouts and different window shapes used throughout the structure. Originally the second and third stories were covered in cedar shingles. They were replaced by stucco after a 1918 fire. On the interior the dining room features a barrel-vaulted ceiling and elaborate woodwork in the entry hall.
