= Weyerhaeuser Real Estate Company =

- Company type: Subsidiary
- Industry: Home construction Real estate development
- Founded: 1969; 57 years ago
- Defunct: July 8, 2014; 11 years ago
- Fate: Acquired by Tri Pointe Homes
- Headquarters: Federal Way, Washington, U.S.
- Parent: Weyerhaeuser

Weyerhaeuser Real Estate Company (WRECO) was a home construction and real-estate developer. WRECO was formed in 1969 as a subsidiary of Weyerhaeuser. It constructed homes under the names Quadrant Homes (greater Seattle and Puget Sound area), Pardee Homes (California and Nevada), Maracay Homes (Arizona), Trendmaker Homes, Avanti Custom Homes, Texas Casual Cottages (Texas), Winchester Homes, Camberley Homes, and Everson Homes (Maryland and Virginia). Weyerhaeuser Realty Investors (WRI) provided capital to other builders. In 2014, the company was acquired by Tri Pointe Homes.
