= Thomas P. Sinnett =

American politician

Thomas Patrick Sinnett – (March 17, 1880 – April 31, 1967) was a member of the Illinois House of Representatives from 1924 until 1938. He served as the Democratic Party Floor leader for one session from 1933 to 1934.

Sinnett was born near Hopedale, Illinois in Tazewell County to Michael and Johanna Sinnett who were farmers. He attended public schools before studying at Illinois State Normal University where he graduated in 1904. He earned a Bachelor of Arts degree in 1909 from the University of Illinois where he was a member of Sigma Pi fraternity. He took law courses at Northwestern University where he passed the bar exam without attaining his law degree. He married Jeannette Helen Connaghon in 1912 in Riverton, Wyoming. His wife died in 1923; they had two daughters, Mary and Margaret.

After school he practiced law in Rock Island, Illinois when he passed the bar exam in 1912. He also spent ten years during this time as a school teacher in Rock Island. He undertook a successful fund drive to help build a classroom building for the Villa de Chantal School in Rock Island for the Sisters of the Order of the Visitation in 1928.

While a member of the Illinois House of Representatives he served as Chairman of the House Committee on Uniform Laws. He served on the committees for Appropriations, Efficiency and Economy, Judicial Apportionment, Judicial Department and Practice, Judiciary, Public Utilities and Transportation, and Rules. He represented the 33rd district. He was also a delegate to the Democratic National Conventions in 1932 and 1936. He was an alternate delegate in 1940, 1944, and 1948.

Sinnett was a member of the Catholic Church, the Knights of Columbus, the Fraternal Order of Eagles, the Loyal Order of Moose, the Modern Woodmen, and the Benevolent and Protective Order of Elks.
