= Steven Rogel =

American businessman

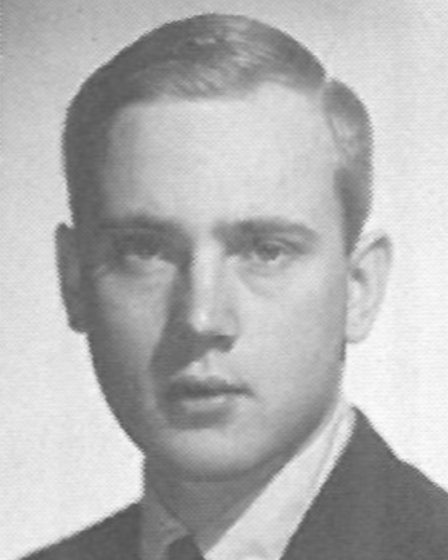
- Born: October 25, 1942 (age 83); Ritzville, Washington
- Education: University of Washington (BS 1965)
- Spouse: Connie Schuler (m. 1964)

Steven R. Rogel (born October 25, 1942) is an American chemical engineer and businessman who worked in the pulp and paper industry in a career that spanned from 1965 to 2009. Rogel rose be become president and chairman of Weyerhaeuser. Rogel has been a member of the company's board of directors since December 1, 1997, and was elected chairman and CEO on April 20, 1999. He has served as chairman in a non-executive capacity since Daniel Fulton became president and CEO in May 2008.

A University of Washington graduate, he received his Bachelor of Science degree in chemical engineering in 1965. He has also completed executive education programs at the Tuck School of Business and the MIT Sloan School of Management.

He was president and chief executive officer of Willamette Industries until 1996, when he joined Weyerhaeuser; the company later bought out Willamette in a hostile takeover in 2002.

Steven Rogel is a member of the National Executive Board of the Boy Scouts of America, the organization's governing body.
