= Tri Pointe Homes =

American home building company

Tri Pointe Homes, Inc.
- Formerly: TRI Pointe Group, Inc. (2014–2020)
- Type: Subsidiary
- Traded as: NYSE: TPH
- Industry: Home construction
- Founded: April 2009; 17 years ago in Irvine, California, U.S.
- Headquarters: Incline Village, Nevada
- Key people: Douglas F. Bauer, CEO; Thomas J. Mitchell, COO; Glenn J. Keeler, CFO
- Parent: Sumitomo Forestry

Tri Pointe Homes, Inc. (formerly Quadrant Homes) is a home construction company headquartered in Incline Village, Nevada. It also offers financing and insurance services to homebuyers. It operates in Arizona, California, Nevada, Washington, Colorado, Texas, the District of Columbia, Maryland, North Carolina, South Carolina, Virginia, Utah, and Florida. The company is the 15th largest home construction company in the United States based on the number of homes closed.

In February 2026, Japanese firm Sumitomo Forestry agreed to acquire the company. The deal was completed in May, 2026.

== History ==
Tri Pointe was founded in April 2009 in Irvine, California by Doug Bauer, Tom Mitchell, and Mike Grubbs. In 2010, it received $150 million in financing from Starwood Capital.

In January 2013, Tri Pointe became a public company via an initial public offering.

In July 2014, Tri Pointe acquired Weyerhaeuser Real Estate Company (WRECO), which constructed homes under the names Quadrant Homes (greater Seattle and Puget Sound area), Pardee Homes (California and Nevada), Maracay Homes (Arizona), Trendmaker Homes, Avanti Custom Homes, Texas Casual Cottages (Texas), Winchester Homes, Camberley Homes, and Everson Homes (Maryland and Virginia).

In January 2021, the company changed its corporate name and rebranded all of its subsidiaries under the name Tri Pointe Homes.

In 2026, Sumitomo Forestry agreed to acquire the company for $47 per share, valuing the deal at about $4.5 billion. The deal was completed in May, 2026 with Tri Pointe Homes becoming a wholly owned subsidiary of Sumitomo Forestry America, Inc., which is a wholly owned subsidiary of Sumitomo Forestry Group, and ceased trading on the New York Stock Exchange.
