= Sala Apartment Building =

- U.S. National Register of Historic Places
- U.S. Historic district – Contributing property
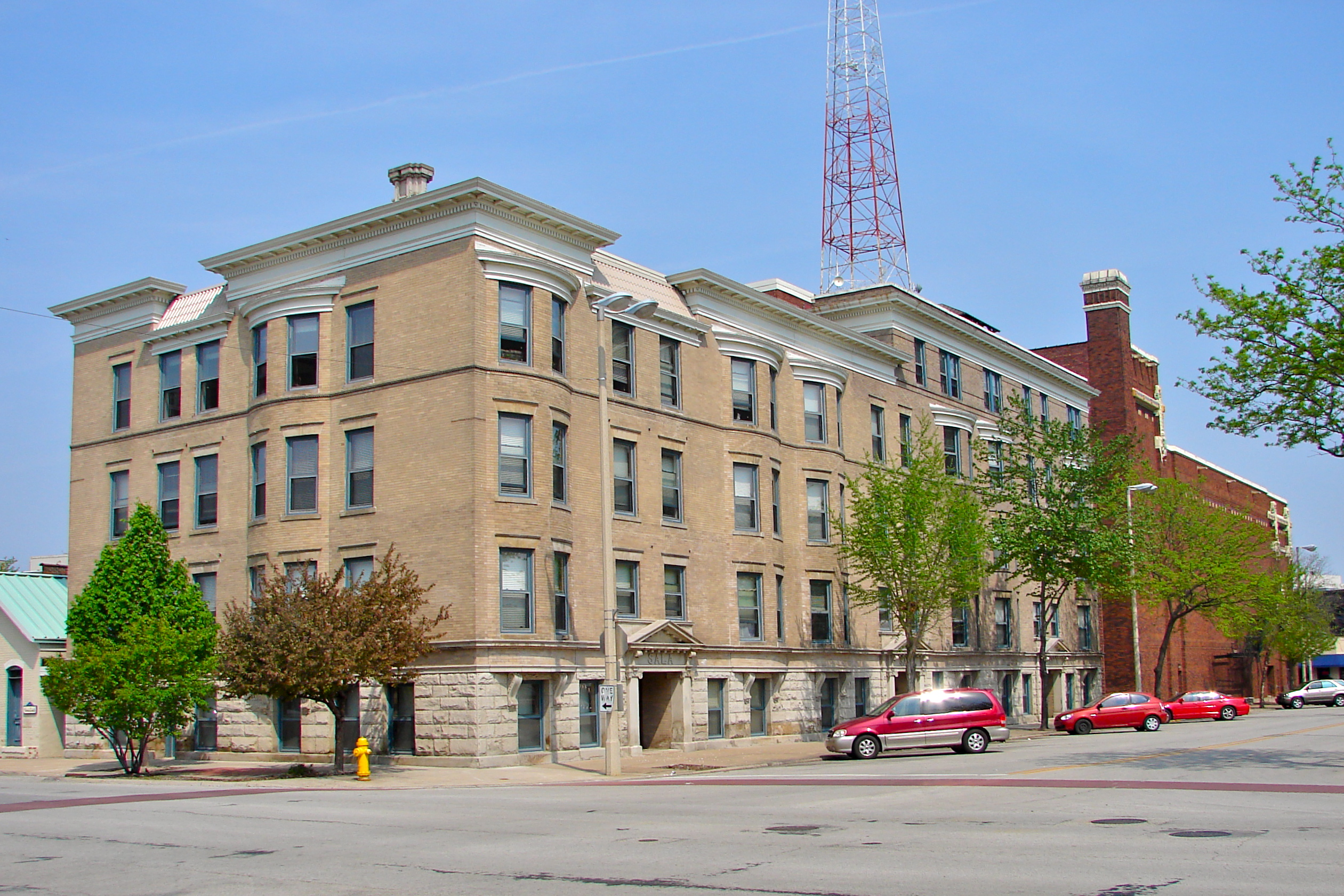
- Sala Apartment Building in 2011

- Location within Illinois Location within the United States
- Location: 320-330 Nineteenth St. Rock Island, Illinois
- Coordinates: 41°30′32″N 90°34′24″W
- Built: 1903, 1913
- Architect: Leonard Drack; C.D. McLane
- Architectural style: Renaissance
- Part of: Downtown Rock Island Historic District (ID100004433)
- NRHP reference No.: 03000782
- Added to NRHP: August 21, 2003

The Sala Apartment Building is a historic building located in Rock Island, Illinois, United States. It was individually listed on the National Register of Historic Places in 2003. In 2020 it was included as a contributing property in the Downtown Rock Island Historic District.

== History ==
The building was built in two sections. The southern section was built in 1903, and the northern section was built 10 years later. It is one of the earliest multiple family dwellings in the city of Rock Island. Both sections were built by Dr. St. Elmo Morgan Sala. He was from a family of physicians and graduated from Keokuk Medical College in 1882 and started his practice in Rock Island. Before building the apartment building the Salas lived in a home on 19th Street. The building was built south of their house. When the first section was completed they moved into apartment 101 and his office moved into the commercial space below. Dr. Sala died in 1921 and his wife, Mary Elizabeth, inherited the property. She married Judge Robert W. Olmsted and after she died, Judge Olmsted purchased the building from her estate in 1936. It was later inherited by his daughters.

== Architecture ==
Rock Island architect Leonard Drack designed the southern section of the apartment building and C.D. McLane designed the northern section. The building consists of 25 apartments that are arranged around five interior light wells. It was built on top of a raised basement, which contained three commercial spaces, three apartments, and storage. The foundations are built of six-course ashlar limestone, and the upper stories are covered in beige pressed brick. Three entrances in the Classical style, and placed symmetrically in the building, feature stone corner pilasters, a narrow Roman Ionic capital with an egg-and-dart detail, and a stone entablature with the name “Sala.”

The apartments feature their original oak and pine woodwork, fireplaces, radiators, porcelain bathroom fixtures and some original light fixtures. The American Craftsman style is found in the north section. It is found in most of the dining rooms, which feature vertical panel wainscoting strips and high plate rails. The stair rails and fireplaces also reflect the simplicity of the style.
