= Friedrich Weyerhäuser =

German-American industrialist (1834–1914)

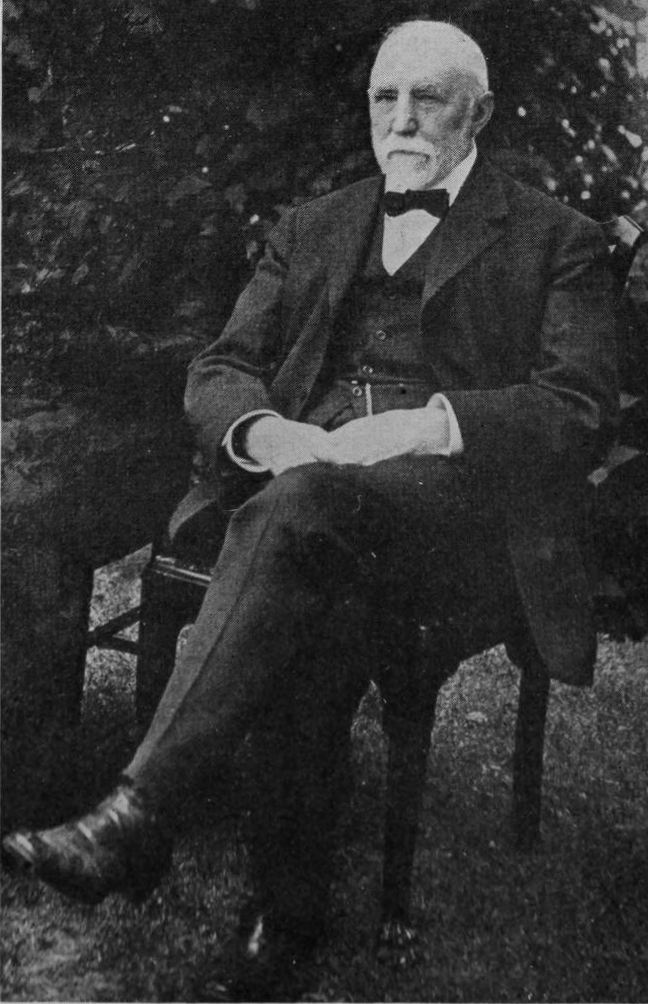
- Born: November 21, 1834; Nieder-Saulheim, Grand Duchy of Hesse, German Confederation
- Died: April 4, 1914 (aged 79); Pasadena, California, U.S.
- Resting place: Chippiannock Cemetery; Rock Island, Illinois; 41°28′54″N 90°34′40″W
- Other name: Frederick Weyerhaeuser
- Known for: Founder of the Weyerhaeuser Company
- Spouse: Sarah Elizabeth Bloedel
- Children: John, Elise, Rudolph, Frederick, Apollonia, Charles, Margaret

Signature
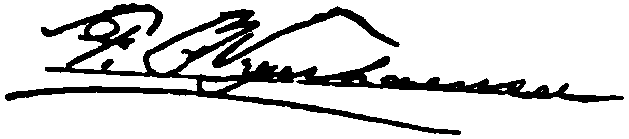

Friedrich (Frederick) Weyerhäuser (November 21, 1834 – April 4, 1914), also spelled Weyerhaeuser, was a German-American timber mogul and founder of the Weyerhaeuser Company, which owns sawmills, paper factories, and other business enterprises as well as large areas of forested land in the northern United States. In 2007, he was rated by Forbes as the eighth-richest American of all time, with a net worth of $85 billion in 2006 dollars. He was known as the "timber-king of the Northwest".

== Early life ==
Friedrich was one of 11 children of Johann Weyerhäuser and his wife. The family supported itself by working a 15-acre (6.1 ha) farm and a 3-acre (1.2 ha) vineyard near Nieder-Saulheim in the independent Grand Duchy of Hesse. Friedrich started attending the Lutheran school at Nieder-Saulheim when he was 6, and at age 8 began helping on the farm. When he was 12, his father died, and Friedrich had to give up most of his studies to help out on the farm. The Revolutions of 1848 in Germany prompted several members of his family to emigrate as Forty-Eighters to western Pennsylvania in the United States. They sent back glowing letters describing the conditions and opportunities they found in America.

In 1852, at the age of 17, Weyerhäuser emigrated with a group of his family from Hesse to the United States. They landed in New York City in July and proceeded to Pennsylvania, settling at North East. Frederick went to work for an earlier immigrant in a brewery. After two years, he abandoned the brewing business, because, as he put it, he felt that a brewer "often becomes his own best customer". He then worked on a farm for a year.

== Career ==
His share of the funds from the sale of the family farm in Germany enabled him to move on further west in search of opportunity, and 1856 found him in Rock Island, Illinois, working on the construction of the Rock Island and Peoria Railroad. After a short time, he entered the sawmill of Mead, Smith and Marsh as a night fireman, quickly moving up to tallyman and then yard manager and salesman. When the company opened a new yard in Coal Valley, he was sent to manage it. Though his yard prospered, the firm got into financial difficulties, and with savings from his salary Frederick bought the business. Thus he began doing business under his own name.

With his brother-in-law, Frederick Denkmann, he formed the Weyerhaeuser-Denkmann Lumber Company and began to acquire interests, including some majority interests, in many other timber companies. He became the central point in what was later called the "Weyerhauser Syndicate", a network of lumber interests, "reputed to have almost a hundred partners, none of whom knew the business of the others", with Weyerhaeuser as the common link. In 1872, he established the Mississippi River Boom and Logging Co., an alliance that handled all the logs that were processed on the Mississippi River. In 1900, Weyerhäuser bought 900,000 acres (3,600 km^{2}) of timberland in the Pacific Northwest from James J. Hill and founded the Weyerhäuser Timber Company. One of the 30 factories in which he held an interest was Potlatch, later Potlatch Corporation. He also owned interests in the Boise Cascade Corporation. The Weyerhaeuser Company is still the world's largest seller of timber.

In 1906, Weyerhäuser's business concerns entered the public eye when the Interstate Commerce Commission recommended to Congress that the lumber industry be investigated for possible anti-trust violations. Weyerhäuser ignored the resulting attention.

== Personal life ==
Weyerhäuser married Sarah Elizabeth Bloedel on October 11, 1857. The couple had seven children: John P. Weyerhauser, Elise (Weyerhauser) Bancroft Hill, Margaret (Weyerhauser) Jewett, Apollonia (Weyerhauser) Davis, Charles A. Weyerhauser, Rudolph M. Weyerhauser, and Frederick E. Weyerhauser.

With his family he lived in a house at the Weyerhauser Lake Nebagomen plant.

In 1904, in thanks to his home community, Weyerhäuser established a music hall in Saulheim, Germany.

== Death ==
Weyerhäuser died in 1914 and was buried in the family mausoleum in Chippiannock Cemetery in Rock Island, Illinois. He was inducted into the U.S. Business Hall of Fame in 1978.

== See also ==
- Weyerhaeuser House, listed on the National Register of Historic Places in Illinois
