= Villa de Chantal Historic District =

Historic district in Illinois, United States

- Formerly listed on the U.S. National Register of Historic Places
- U.S. Historic district
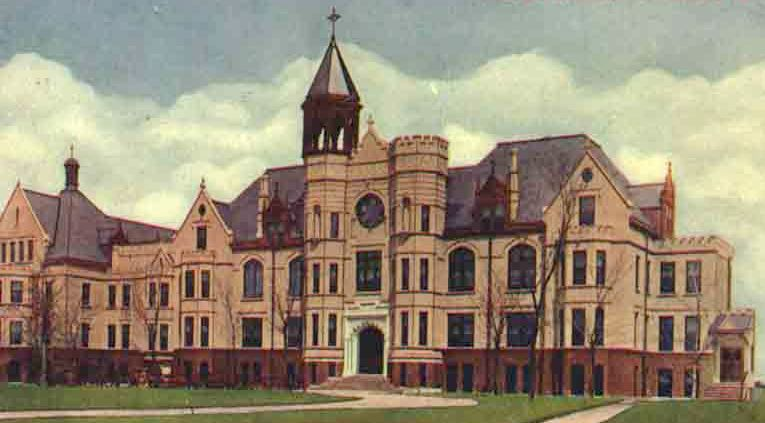
- c. 1912 postcard image of the main building

- Location within Illinois Location within the United States
- Location: 2101 16th Ave., Rock Island, Illinois
- Coordinates: 41°29′55″N 90°34′13″W
- Built: 1901
- Architect: George P. Stauduhar, et al.
- Architectural style: Gothic Revival
- NRHP reference No.: 05000432

Significant dates
- Added to NRHP: May 22, 2005
- Removed from NRHP: August 28, 2012

Villa de Chantal Historic District was a national recognized historic district located in Rock Island, Illinois, United States. The property was designated a Rock Island Landmark in 1994, and it was listed as a historic district on the National Register of Historic Places in 2005. Its local landmark status was removed on November 12, 2007. It was removed from the National Register in 2012. The Villa de Chantal was a Catholic girl's boarding and day school operated by the Sisters of the Visitation. The school closed in 1978 and the building was largely destroyed in a fire in 2005. The property now houses the Rock Island Center for Math & Science of the Rock Island-Milan School District #41.

== History ==
The Visitation Sisters came to Rock Island from Maysville, Kentucky in 1898. They established a school on Fifth Avenue near Sacred Heart Church. Because of the success of the school, they chose to build a larger school and bought property on Ball's Bluff at the edge of Highland Park. The first part of the complex opened in 1901. Within five years the school had grown to 60 boarders and a larger addition was built to expand the school. The older section of the building housed the convent and the new section housed the dormitories, classrooms, and chapel. A chaplain's bungalow was added to the property in 1919. The east wing of the building, known as Lewis Hall, was built in 1929 and contained classrooms and a gymnasium. This expansion was funded by Frank Lewis and a fundraising drive led by Thomas P. Sinnett.

The Sisters operated a twelve-grade school. The boarding school was discontinued in 1958. The last high school class graduated in 1975, and the school itself ceased operating in 1978. In the early 1990s the complex was sold and a private school, named Morningstar Academy, occupied the building. The building was also available for parties and receptions. The school moved from the building in 2005 when developer Chris Ales purchased the building. He intended to renovate the building into apartments for senior citizens as he had done in the former St. Katherine's-St. Mark's School and the former Marycrest College buildings across the river in Davenport, Iowa.

In the early morning hours of July 14, 2005, the older sections of the building were consumed in a fire. Only the brick shell of the structure remained, as did the 1929 addition and the caretaker's home. The cause of the fire was not determined. The Rock Island-Milan School District acquired the property and the remaining buildings were torn down in 2008. The Rock Island Center for Math & Science, a magnet school focusing on math and science, opened in 2010.

== Architecture ==
The two older wings of the building were designed by Rock Island architect George P. Stauduhar in the Gothic Revival style. The original sections featured a dark rough brick on the ground level and a light buff brick on the upper portions. The main entrance was framed by two octagon-shaped towers. The western tower was topped by a belfry and contained a bell the Sisters had brought with them from Kentucky. The tower on the east side was crenelated at the top. The entrance itself was white glazed terra cotta. The façade featured different window shapes, such as a rose window, pointed arch chapel windows, gothic outlined and tracery windows and simple multi-paned casements. Lewis Hall was designed by architect Edward Lerch. It was similar to the western portion of the building, but less ornate. The Chaplain's Bungalow, which Stauduhar also designed, was influenced by the Prairie School style. The side openings of the porch show influences of the Gothic style that tie it in with the rest of the Villa.
