= Skelly Service Station (Moline, Illinois) =

- U.S. National Register of Historic Places
- Moline Historic Landmark
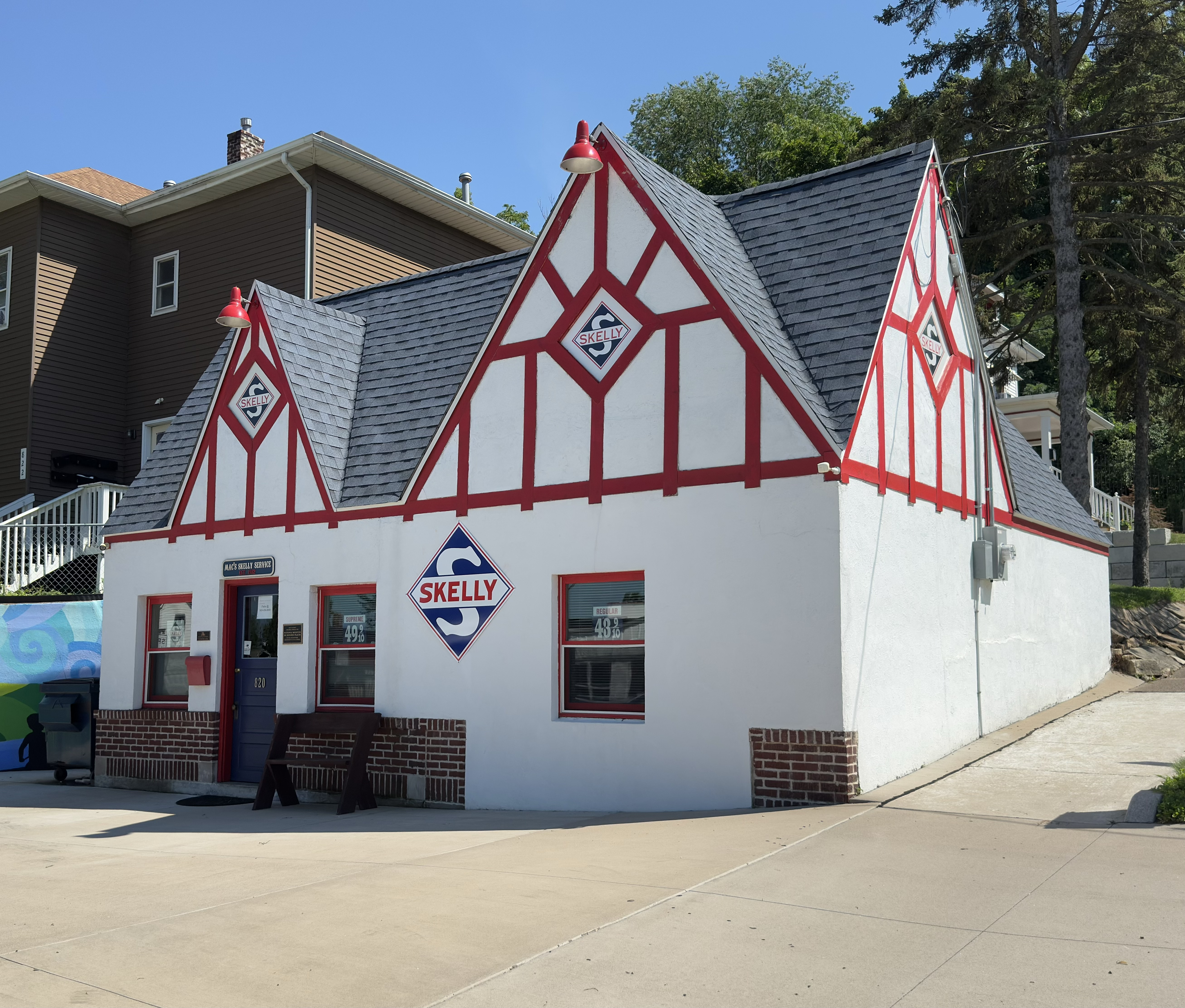
- The former Skelly Service Station in 2025

- Location within Illinois Location within the United States
- Location: 820 5th Ave. Moline, Illinois
- Coordinates: 41°30′14.5″N 90°31′31.7″W
- Area: less than one acre
- Built: 1932, 1938
- Architectural style: Tudor Revival
- NRHP reference No.: 100010701

Significant dates
- Added to NRHP: August 14, 2024
- Designated MHL: September, 2022

Skelly Service Station is an historic building located in the Floreciente neighborhood of Moline, Illinois, United States. The eastern third of the building was completed in 1932 in the Tudor Revival style to serve as a Skelly gas station. The service bay on the west side of the building was completed six years later. Its historical significance is derived from its being a Cottage Gas Station building type. Because Tudor Revival was a popular residential style at the time, it was used for gas stations so that they would blend into the surrounding neighborhood. It is the only remaining gas station building in this type left in Moline. There is one example of this style that also served as a Skelly station that is still in existence in neighboring Rock Island, Illinois. It was built in 1945. Two other former Skelly service stations remain in Moline, but they were built in a modern style in 1938.

By 1958, the building no longer served as a gas station. It housed other businesses until it was used for storage. In 2018, Felix and Mary Vallejo bought the property and began a historic preservation project. The building was named a Moline Historic Landmark in 2022, and it was listed on the National Register of Historic Places in 2024.
