= Arsenal Courts Historic District =

Historic district in Illinois, United States

- U.S. National Register of Historic Places
- U.S. Historic district
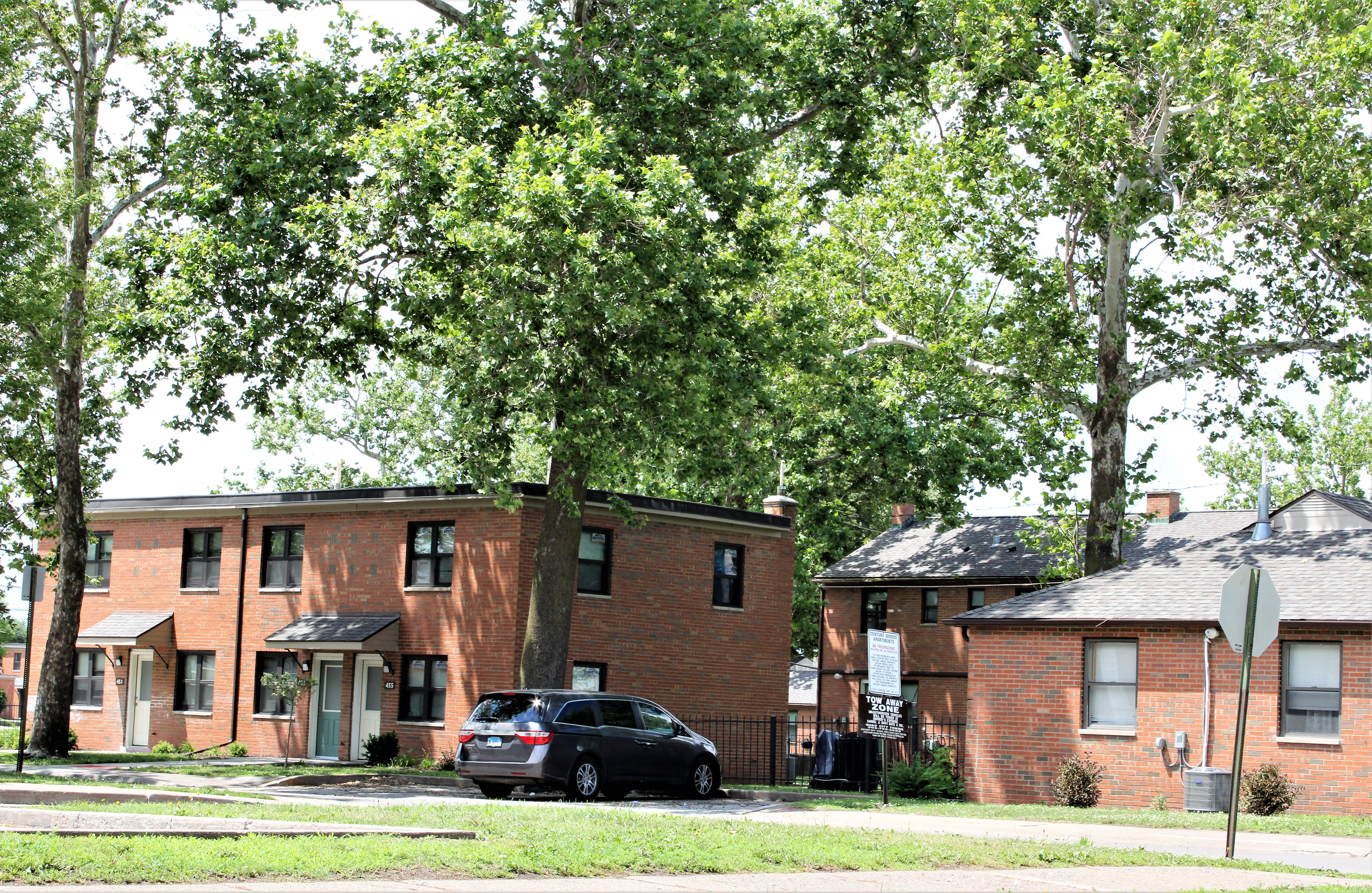

- Location within Illinois Location within the United States
- Location: 1400 Fifth St. Rock Island, Illinois
- Coordinates: 41°29′49.5″N 90°35′30.3″W
- Area: 16 acres (6.5 ha)
- Built: 1940-1941
- Built by: Lovering Construction Co.
- Architect: William Stuhr
- Architectural style: Colonial Revival
- NRHP reference No.: 100004851
- Added to NRHP: January 6, 2020

Arsenal Courts, also known as Century Woods, is a nationally recognized historic district located in Rock Island, Illinois, United States. It was added to the National Register of Historic Places in 2020. At the time of its nomination it consisted of 43 resources, all of them contributing buildings.

== History ==
Arsenal Courts is an apartment complex built by the United States Housing Authority from 1940 to 1941 to house defense workers at the Rock Island Arsenal. This was one of the earliest housing projects in Illinois funded by the agency. At that time, Rock Island was one of the country's largest arsenals and it manufactured munitions and military equipment. The construction of the apartments was an emergency measure brought by the onset of World War II. The arsenal was in need of more workers, but the area suffered from a housing shortage. The complex was designed by William Stuhr, a partner in the Rock Island architectural firm of Cervin & Stuhr. It was built by the Lovering Construction Company of St. Paul, Minnesota. After the war ended the need to house defense workers on this scale subsided, and the federal government ordered the Rock Island Housing Authority to change Arsenal Courts to low-income housing. After this time, as the workers at the Arsenal moved elsewhere, the area became known for its high crime rate. The city bought the complex in 1980 and planned to tear it down. They lost a class-action lawsuit and agreed to renovate the buildings and to replace the Rock Island Housing Authority with a new management firm. However, the low point for the complex occurred in 1993 when only 78 of its apartments were rented and a majority of the windows were boarded up.

Originally, the complex included 52 one- and two-story brick buildings with 305 units. Eleven of the buildings were torn down in 1995 to reduce density in the complex. The number of units has been reduced to 230. That same year, Arsenal Courts was renamed Century Woods. The Millennia Companies of Cleveland, Ohio acquired the complex in April 2019 after managing it for several years. A $14 million-plus renovation of the complex began in May 2019.

== Architecture ==
The complex is composed of buildings that feature a simple, rectangular design. Most have a flat roof and lack ornamentation overall. The decorative details are found in the lattice-type porch columns and pedimented porch roofs. They were influenced by the Colonial Revival style. The interiors featured a number of configurations depending on the number of bedrooms and bathrooms. Arsenal Courts is located in a neighborhood that consists primarily of small, early 20th century, vernacular or bungalow style single-family houses. To the west is an industrial area that is separated from the complex by an expressway. The streets within the complex basically follow the city's street grid. In addition to the apartment buildings, there is also an administration building and the original storage building. The single-story Community Building constructed in the mid-1990s is outside of the historic district's boundaries.
