= Peoples National Bank Building–Fries Building =

- Peoples National Bank Building– Fries Building
- U.S. National Register of Historic Places
- U.S. Historic district – Contributing property
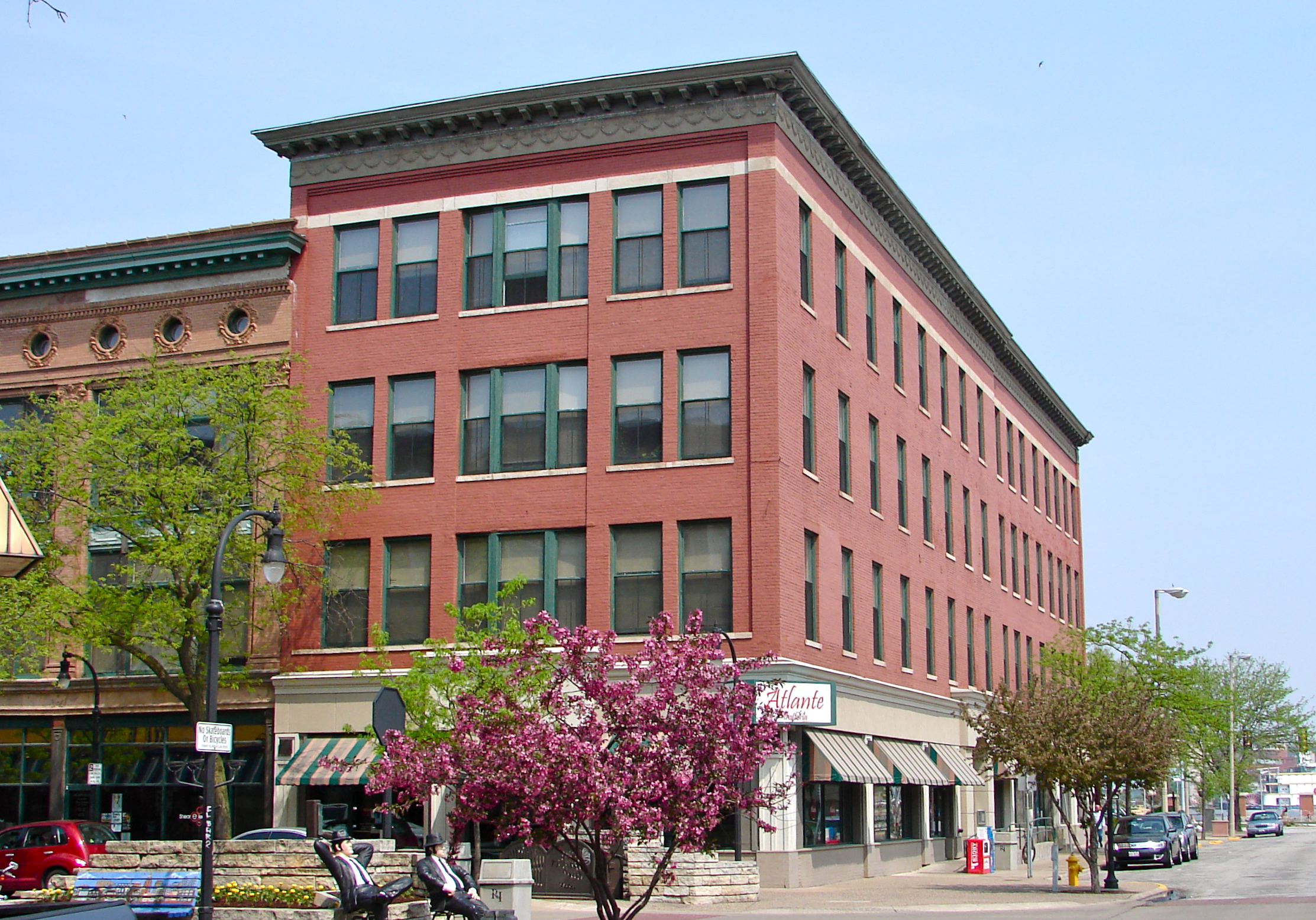
- Peoples National Bank Building

- Location within Illinois Location within the United States
- Location: 1729–1731 and 1723-1727 2nd Ave., Rock Island, Illinois
- Coordinates: 41°30′39″N 90°34′30″W
- Built: 1876 (Peoples National Bank); 1897 (Fries Building)
- Architect: Leonard M. Drack; George M. Kerns
- Architectural style: Early Commercial; Classical Revival
- Part of: Downtown Rock Island Historic District (ID100004433)
- NRHP reference No.: 99001381
- Added to NRHP: November 22, 1999

Peoples National Bank Building–Fries Building are two historic buildings located in downtown Rock Island, Illinois, United States. They were listed together on the National Register of Historic Places in 1999. They were included as contributing properties in the Downtown Rock Island Historic District in 2020. The buildings were built separately, but have subsequently been connected on the first three floors.

== People’s National Bank Building ==
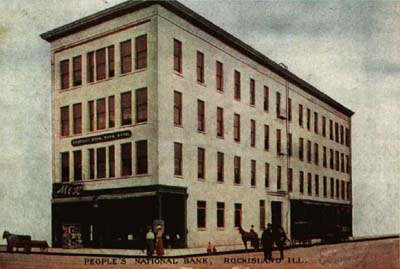
People's National Bank c. 1906

The People's National Bank Building was constructed as a three-story building around 1876 by a now unknown person. The original architect is also unknown, but it is known that Drack & Kerns and George Stauduhar have altered the building in subsequent years. The bank itself had been organized two years previously, and purchased the building around 1904. They extensively renovated the building and added the fourth floor. In 1912 the bank branched out into the German Trust & Savings Bank, renamed American Trust & Savings Bank during World War I, to handle personal accounts. The banks were bought and sold during the 1920s and eventually closed. The building's first floor housed an early location of McCabe's Department Store. They were followed by a series of other retailers.

== Fries Building ==
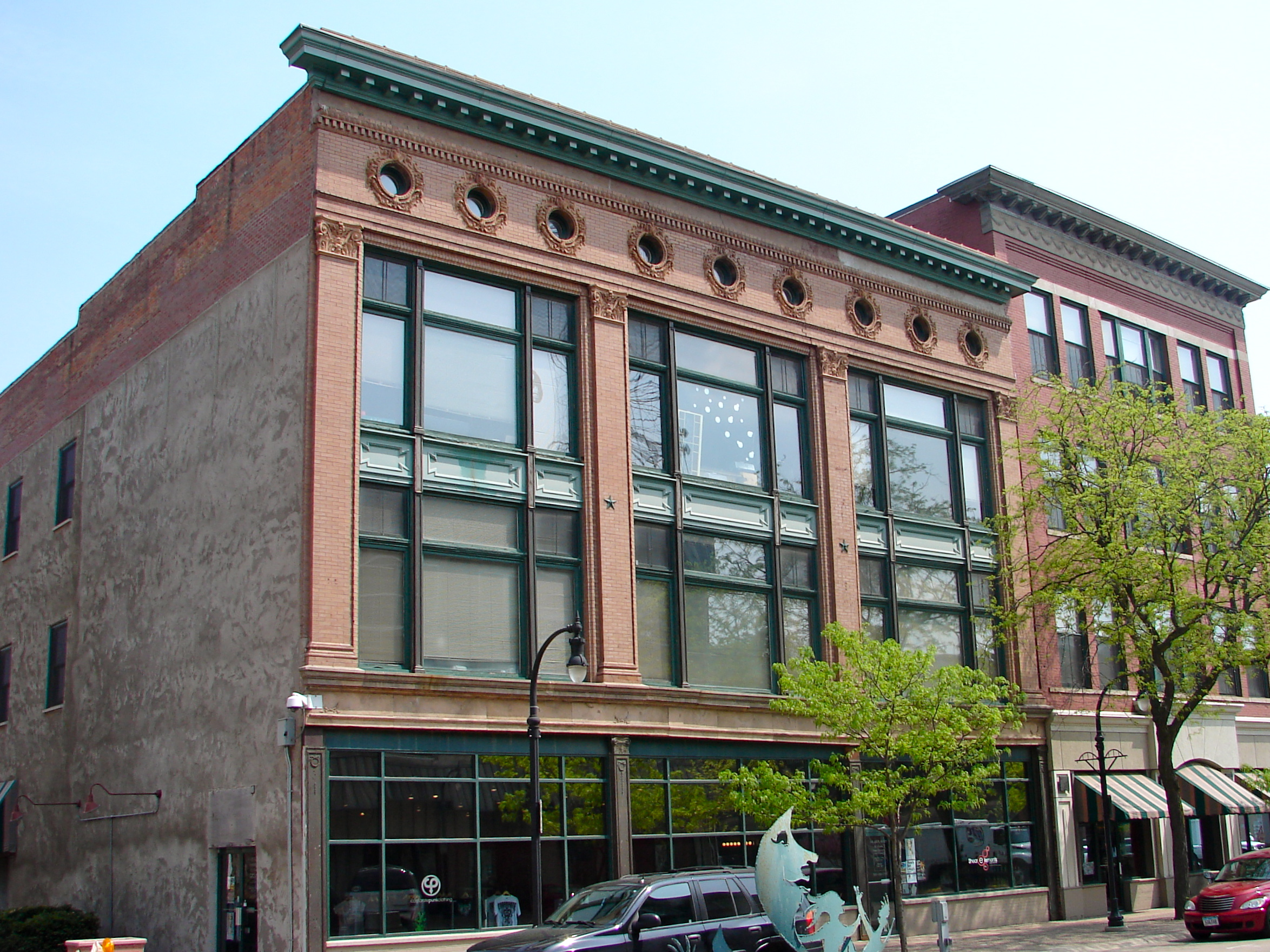
Fries Building

The Fries Building was built by Frank G. Young and William Sharp McCombs as the new location for their department store. It was designed by the architectural firm of Drack & Kerns. The building opened in 1897 and featured 22,400 square feet (2,080 m^{2}) of space. The store moved to a larger building 1909. Subsequent retailers who occupied the building include a shoe store, Mosenfelder & Kohn; a furniture store, Hadley Company; Bennison's Department Store and the New York Store.

== Architecture ==
The bank portion of the building is a four-story brick structure. In addition to the fourth floor, the Second Avenue façade was added to the building in 1904. The Fries Building is three-stories and features a decorative frieze and round windows at the top. Pilasters are located between the large windows on the upper levels. Both buildings feature a tripartite division of base, center, and cornice that horizontally divide the buildings. Both buildings also feature Commercial style windows.
