= Black's Store =

- U.S. National Register of Historic Places
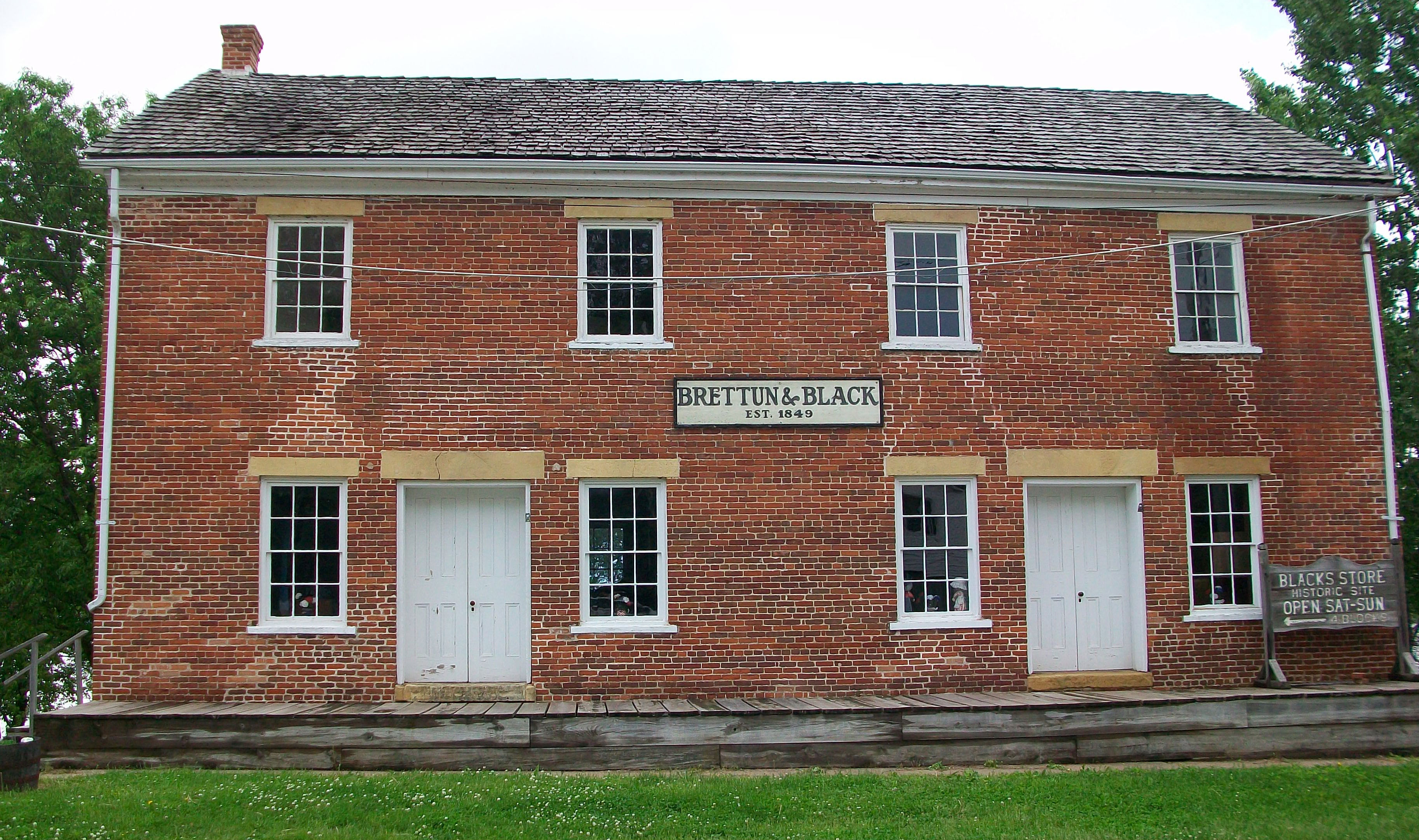

- Location within Illinois Location within the United States
- Location: 1st Ave. Hampton, Illinois
- Coordinates: 41°33′25″N 90°24′51″W
- Area: less than one acre
- Built: 1849
- NRHP reference No.: 76000727
- Added to NRHP: May 28, 1976

Black's Store, also known as the Brettun & Black Museum, is an historic building located in Hampton, Illinois, United States. The mercantile store was built in 1849 and was the largest store in Northwest Illinois when it opened. It is a three-story brick structure that had one of the first elevators in the Midwest. Preservationist Ron Nelson of Bishop Hill, Illinois restored the elevator in recent years. The store served as a riverboat stop and later as a stop on the Galena Stagecoach.

The Brettun & Black Museum recreates the 1849 store. It was listed on the National Register of Historic Places in 1976.
