= Hampton, Illinois =

Hampton
- Village
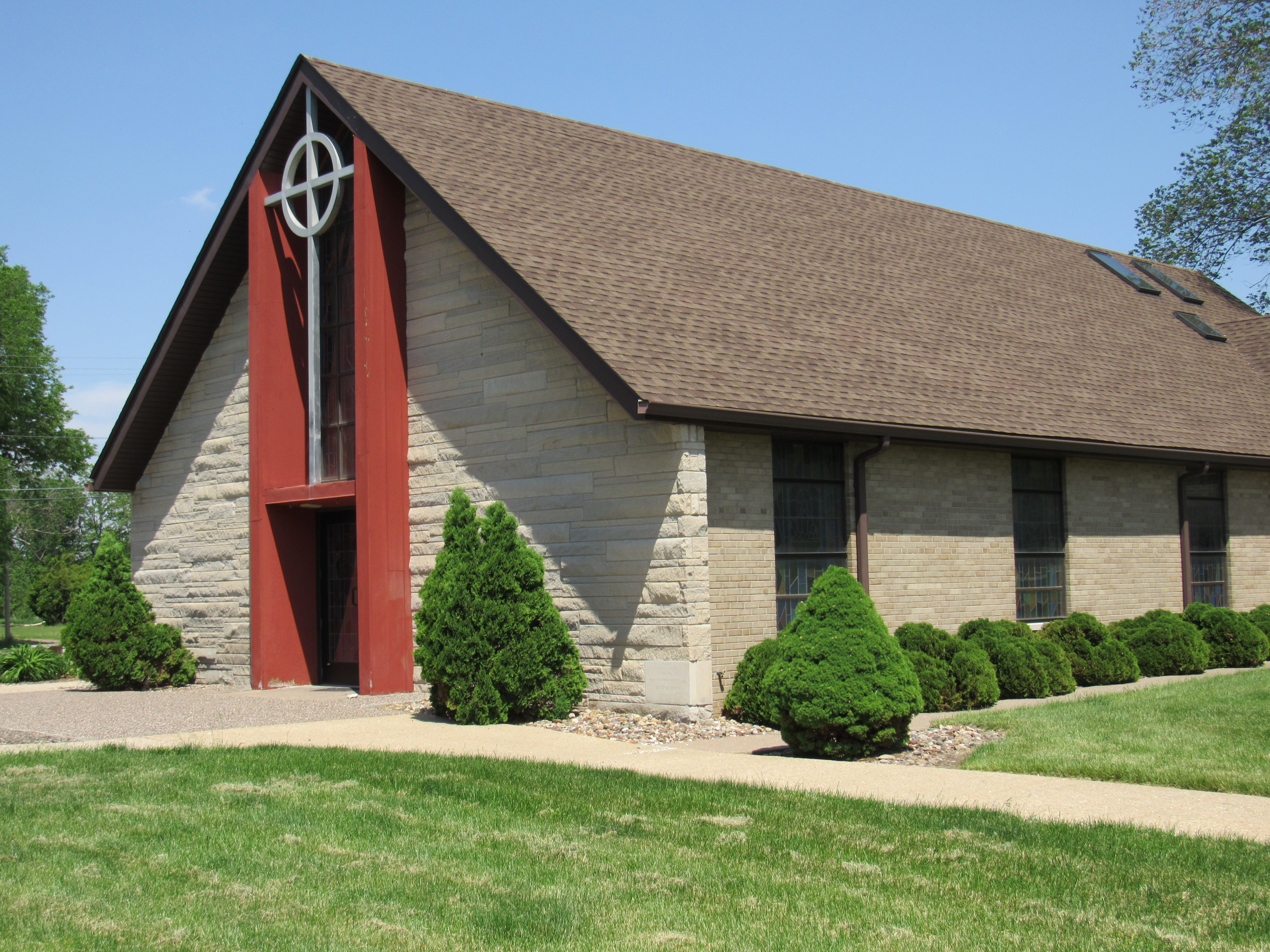
- St. Mary's Catholic Church

- Location of Hampton in Rock Island County, Illinois.

- Location of Illinois in the United States
- Coordinates: 41°33′20″N 90°24′17″W
- Country: United States
- State: Illinois
- County: Rock Island

Area
  - Total: 1.49 sq mi (3.85 km^{2})
  - Land: 1.46 sq mi (3.78 km^{2})
  - Water: 0.027 sq mi (0.07 km^{2})
- Elevation: 640 ft (200 m)

Population (2020)
  - Total: 1,779
  - Density: 1,217.4/sq mi (470.03/km^{2})
- Time zone: UTC-6 (CST)
  - Summer (DST): UTC-5 (CDT)
- ZIP Code(s): 61256
- Area code: 309
- FIPS code: 17-32564
- GNIS feature ID: 2398235
- Website: hamptonil.org

Hampton is a village in Rock Island County, Illinois, United States. The population was 1,779 at the time of the 2020 census. down from 1,863 at the 2010 census.

== History ==
The village was originally in territory claimed by the Sauk and Meskwaki Native Americans, and several Woodland era Native mounds are located in the village limits, and in the adjacent Illiniwek Forest Preserve. The village in 1834 was platted as "Milan" (not the village 13 miles south-southwest in Illinois—see Milan, Illinois for more). The "paper town" did not sell initially because of the swampy riverfront, and being adjacent to the north end of the Rock Island Rapids. However, settlers drained the swamps by the end of the 19th century, and the village was founded by 1900 as Hampton— the original name of Milan, Illinois. Black's Store, which is listed on the National Register of Historic Places, was the first mercantile store to open in Northwest Illinois.

== Geography ==
According to the 2010 census, Hampton has a total area of 1.65 square miles (4.27 km^{2}), all land.

== Demographics ==
Historical population
Census	Pop.	Note	%±
1880	576		—
1890	341		−40.8%
1900	374		9.7%
1910	348		−7.0%
1920	460		32.2%
1930	485		5.4%
1940	532		9.7%
1950	706		32.7%
1960	742		5.1%
1970	1,612		117.3%
1980	1,873		16.2%
1990	1,601		−14.5%
2000	1,626		1.6%
2010	1,863		14.6%
2020	1,779		−4.5%
U.S. Decennial Census

=== Racial and ethnic composition ===
Hampton village, Illinois – Racial and ethnic composition Note: the US Census treats Hispanic/Latino as an ethnic category. This table excludes Latinos from the racial categories and assigns them to a separate category. Hispanics/Latinos may be of any race.
Race / Ethnicity (NH = Non-Hispanic)	Pop 2000	Pop 2010	Pop 2020	% 2000	% 2010	% 2020
White alone (NH)	1,519	1,685	1,511	93.42%	90.45%	84.94%
Black or African American alone (NH)	4	16	25	0.25%	0.86%	1.41%
Native American or Alaska Native alone (NH)	14	4	2	0.86%	0.21%	0.11%
Asian alone (NH)	2	2	5	0.12%	0.11%	0.28%
Native Hawaiian or Pacific Islander alone (NH)	0	0	0	0.00%	0.00%	0.00%
Other race alone (NH)	0	1	13	0.00%	0.05%	0.73%
Mixed race or Multiracial (NH)	7	16	77	0.43%	0.86%	4.33%
Hispanic or Latino (any race)	80	139	146	4.92%	7.46%	8.21%
Total	1,626	1,863	1,779	100.00%	100.00%	100.00%

=== 2020 census ===
As of the 2020 census, Hampton had a population of 1,779. The median age was 47.6 years. 20.2% of residents were under the age of 18 and 25.3% of residents were 65 years of age or older. For every 100 females, there were 98.3 males, and for every 100 females age 18 and over, there were 96.5 males.

99.7% of residents lived in urban areas, while 0.3% lived in rural areas.

There were 769 households in Hampton, of which 25.9% had children under the age of 18 living in them. Of all households, 54.7% were married-couple households, 16.3% were households with a male householder and no spouse or partner present, and 23.1% were households with a female householder and no spouse or partner present. About 26.2% of all households were made up of individuals, and 14.1% had someone living alone who was 65 years of age or older.

There were 808 housing units, of which 4.8% were vacant. The homeowner vacancy rate was 0.9% and the rental vacancy rate was 8.5%.

=== 2000 census ===
As of the census of 2000, there were 1,626 people, 631 households, and 480 families residing in the village. The population density was 1,028.8 inhabitants per square mile (397.2/km^{2}). There were 661 housing units at an average density of 418.2 per square mile (161.5/km^{2}). The racial makeup of the village was 95.57% White, 0.25% African American, 0.86% Native American, 0.12% Asian, 2.21% from other races, and 0.98% from two or more races. Hispanic or Latino of any race were 4.92% of the population.

There were 631 households, out of which 28.5% had children under the age of 18 living with them, 66.6% were married couples living together, 7.1% had a female householder with no husband present, and 23.9% were non-families. 20.3% of all households were made up of individuals, and 11.1% had someone living alone who was 65 years of age or older. The average household size was 2.56 and the average family size was 2.95.

In the village, the population was spread out, with 23.1% under the age of 18, 7.1% from 18 to 24, 25.5% from 25 to 44, 30.8% from 45 to 64, and 13.5% who were 65 years of age or older. The median age was 41 years. For every 100 females, there were 94.0 males. For every 100 females age 18 and over, there were 94.1 males.

The median income for a household in the village was $48,438, and the median income for a family was $59,375. Males had a median income of $42,134 versus $25,063 for females. The per capita income for the village was $22,492. About 5.4% of families and 7.3% of the population were below the poverty line, including 10.0% of those under age 18 and 9.7% of those age 65 or over.

== Transportation ==
Quad Cities MetroLINK provides bus service on Route 10 connecting Hampton to destinations across the Quad Cities.

== Education ==
It is in the Hampton School District 29 and the United Township High School District 30.
