= Potter House (Rock Island, Illinois) =

Historic house in Illinois, United States

- U.S. National Register of Historic Places
- U.S. Historic district – Contributing property
- Rock Island Landmark
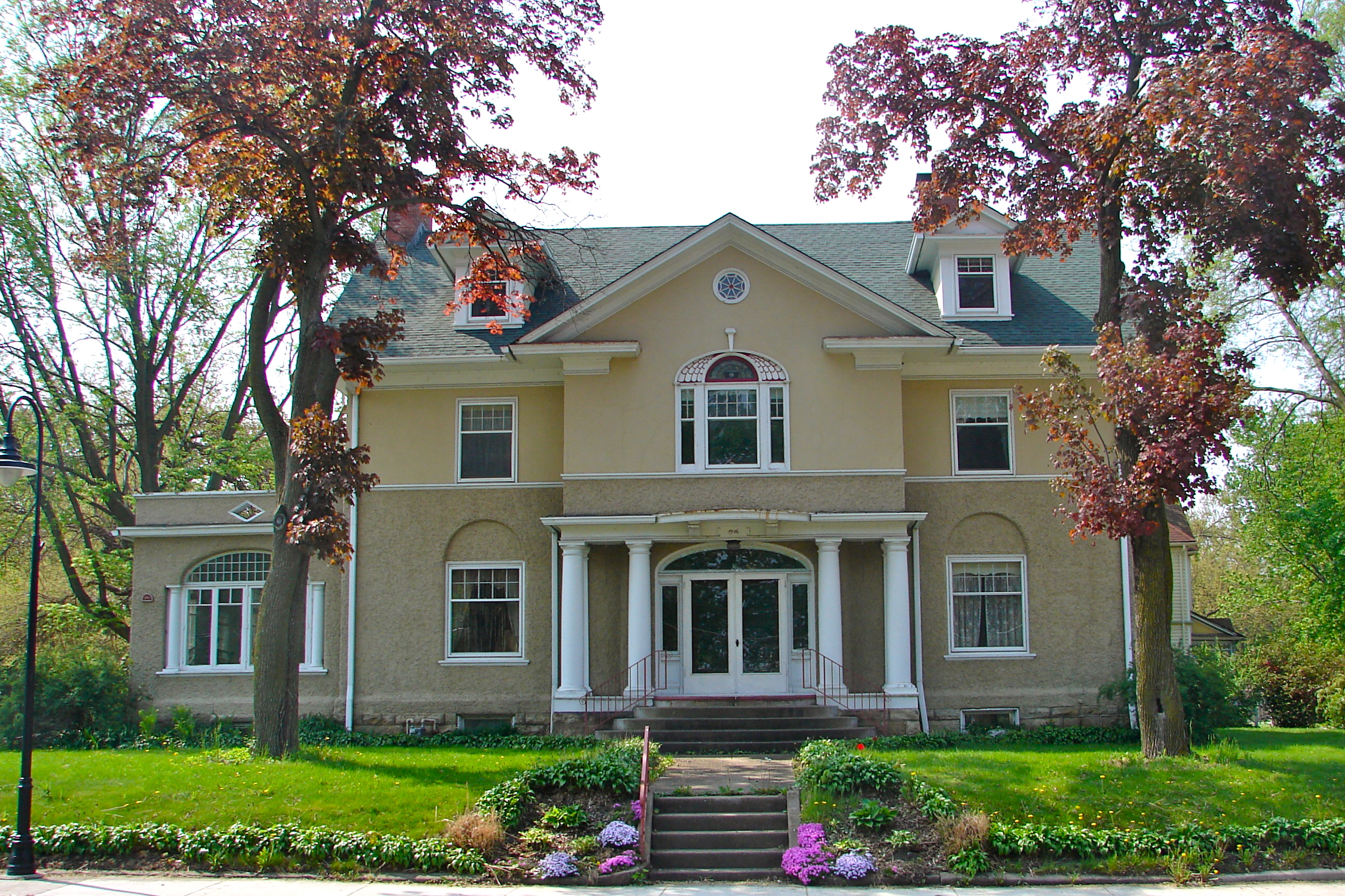

- Location within Illinois Location within the United States
- Location: 1906 7th Ave. Rock Island, Illinois
- Coordinates: 41°30′18″N 90°34′25″W
- Area: less than one acre
- Built: 1907
- Architect: George Stauduhar
- Architectural style: Colonial Revival
- NRHP reference No.: 89000364

Significant dates
- Added to NRHP: May 5, 1989
- Designated RIL: 1987

The Potter House is a historic building located in Rock Island, Illinois, United States. It was designated a Rock Island Landmark in 1987, listed individually on the National Register of Historic Places in 1989, and the house was included as a contributing property in the Broadway Historic District in 1998.

== Minnie Potter ==
The home was built by Minnie Potter who was the president of J.W. Potter Company, which owned the Rock Island Argus newspaper. Her husband had bought the newspaper in 1882 when it had only 500 subscribers. He died at the age of 36 in 1898. Minnie was 32 at the time and a mother of three young children. She took over the leadership of the paper and raised her family. She never remarried. The Argus prospered under her leadership and she directed the construction of a new newspaper plant on Fourth Avenue in 1925. Mrs. Potter had the home built in 1907 and lived there until her death, and the home remained in the family until 1983. The Potter family sold the newspaper in 1985.

== Architecture ==
The home was designed by Rock Island architect George Stauduhar in the Colonial Revival style. It also includes elements of the Prairie School style. The Colonial Revival style is found in the main façade’s symmetry, door sidelights, the elliptical fanlight above the door, and in the multiple panes of glass of the upper sashes on the windows. Many of the widows, however, are characteristic of the Prairie style. They have a larger sash with a single pane of glass and are topped with a smaller upper sash. The exterior of the house is covered in stucco. The texture on the lower half of the wall is rough, while the top is smoother. The interior features leather embossed wall coverings in the front entrance, a grand central staircase, mahogany paneling, stained glass, and six fireplaces.
