= Frederick Denkmann =

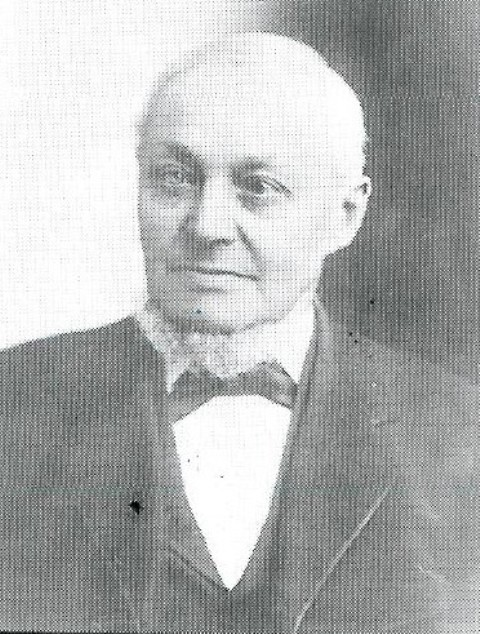
- Born: April 8, 1821; Salzwedel, Prussia
- Died: March 2, 1905 (aged 83); Rock Island, Illinois, US
- Resting place: Chippiannock Cemetery; Rock Island, Illinois; 41°28′54″N 90°34′40″W
- Known for: Co-founder of Weyerhaeuser-Denkmann Lumber Company
- Spouse: Anna Catherine Bloedel (died 1907)
- Children: Seven

Frederick Denkmann (April 8, 1821 – March 2, 1905) was an American lumber baron based in Rock Island, Illinois. He teamed up with his brother-in-law Friedrich Weyerhäuser and formed Weyerhäuser-Denkmann Lumber Company.

== Biography ==
=== Early life ===
Frederick Carl August Denkmann was born in Salzwedel in the Kingdom of Prussia, present-day Saxony-Anhalt, Germany and immigrated to the United States. He was a skilled machinist and worked for Buford and Tate Foundry in Rock Island. He also owned a small grocery store that was operated by his wife Catherine. In 1860 the Mead, Smith and Marsh sawmill in Rock Island went bankrupt. Friedrich Weyerhäuser who was married to Catherine Denkmann's sister Sarah, had worked at the mill. The mill was seized by the sheriff and put up for sale. Weyerhäuser convinced Denkmann to go in with him and buy it for $3,000, with a $500 down payment.

=== Weyerhaeuser-Denkmann ===
The Weyerhaeuser-Denkmann Lumber Company immediately became successful after Denkmann improved its production methods. Production doubled from its previous year’s capacity of 8,000 board feet per day. Denkmann worked long hours to insure that the machinery was in working order. He nearly drowned in the Mississippi River trying to save logs that escaped from the boom, which is a holding pen for the logs on the river. On another occasion he lost two fingers in a planer. Denkmann was reported to have had his hand tied up, placed in a sling and was at work in the mill the next day. While Denkmann focused his attention on the mill, Weyerhäuser—who was a natural salesman—took care of the commercial aspects of the business.

Denkmann and Weyerhäuser were able to expand the mill and added more machinery. They also bought a second lumber mill that was renamed Anawalt, Denkmann and Company. They signed a lucrative contract with Union Pacific Railroad for 950,000 board feet of lumber. They went to the white pine forests along the Chippewa River in Wisconsin for a new source for wood. They were among 17 lumber companies that formed the Mississippi River Logging Company in 1872. They would harvest the timber in the north and send it to the mills along the river in log rafts. In one day in 1896 a record 64 rafts passed under the Government Bridge between Rock Island and Davenport, Iowa. The longest recorded raft was sent down the Mississippi that same year. It measured 1,560 feet (475.5 M) by 296 feet (90 m) and covered 8 acres (3.2 ha) of water. It was powered by a sternwheeler named the F.C.A. Denkmann.

Fire destroyed the Anawalt, Denkmann mill in 1876 and caused an estimated $40,000 in losses. They built a new mill on the same site and acquired the troubled Keator mill on 24th Street and added it to Anawalt, Denkmann in 1878. Denkmann and Weyerhäuser formed a new corporation for the two mills and called it the Rock Island Lumber and Manufacturing Company. Ten years later the two companies, Weyerhaeuser-Denkmann Lumber Company and Rock Island Lumber and Manufacturing, employed 1,000 men and had $175 million in annual sales.

In 1885 they bought the Renwick, Shaw and Crosset Company mill across the river in Davenport. On July 24, 1901 the mill, along with the Lindsay and Phelps mill, the Roberts woodyard and a section of southeast Davenport was destroyed in a fire. Denkmann raced across the Government Bridge with extra fire hoses to help put out the fire. The fire destroyed 20 acres (8.1 ha), left 250 people homeless and caused $1.25 million in damage.

Denkmann and Weyerhäuser had two other companies fail. A flour mill in nearby Coal Valley, Illinois, and a woolen mill in Rock Island were both financial failures.

=== Death ===
Frederick Denkmann died in 1905 at the age of 82. The lumber mill in Rock Island ceased operating on November 18, 1905, six months after his death. By this time Friedrich Weyerhäuser had re-located to the Pacific Northwest where he had recently established the Weyerhaeuser Timber Company. While Denkmann was still alive the two gave substantial amounts of money to build the Rock Island Public Library. After he died, Frederick Denkmann’s children donated what is now known as Denkmann Memorial Hall to Augustana College in Rock Island. The building served as a library from 1911 to 1990. It now houses the college's foreign language departments and other offices.

== River of Life window ==
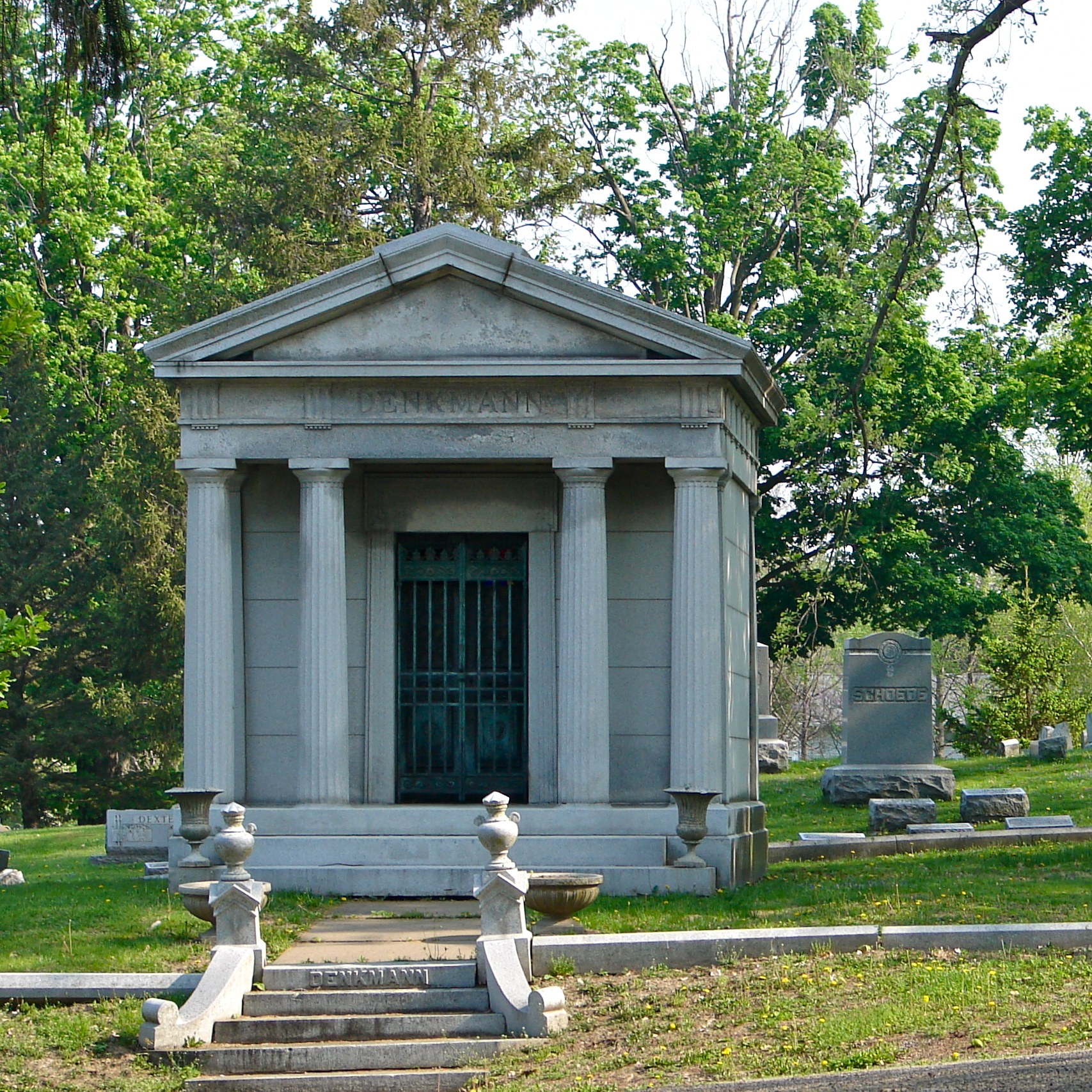
Denkmann Mausoleum in Chippiannock Cemetery

After Frederick Denkmann died he was buried in a mausoleum in Rock Island’s Chippiannock Cemetery. On April 5, 1976 the cemetery superintendent Joseph Vogele discovered that the mausoleum had been broken into and a stained glass window by Louis Comfort Tiffany was stolen. The thieves were never caught, but the window was located in Jamaica, New York, in the 1990s. It was eventually returned to the Denkmann family in 1997 and a Tiffany glass conservator was hired to repair a couple of cracks in the window in 1999. It is now on permanent loan to the Figge Art Museum in Davenport.
