= United States Housing Corporation Historic District (Rock Island, Illinois) =

Historic district in Illinois, United States

- United States Housing Corporation (U.S.H.C.) Historic District
- U.S. National Register of Historic Places
- U.S. Historic district
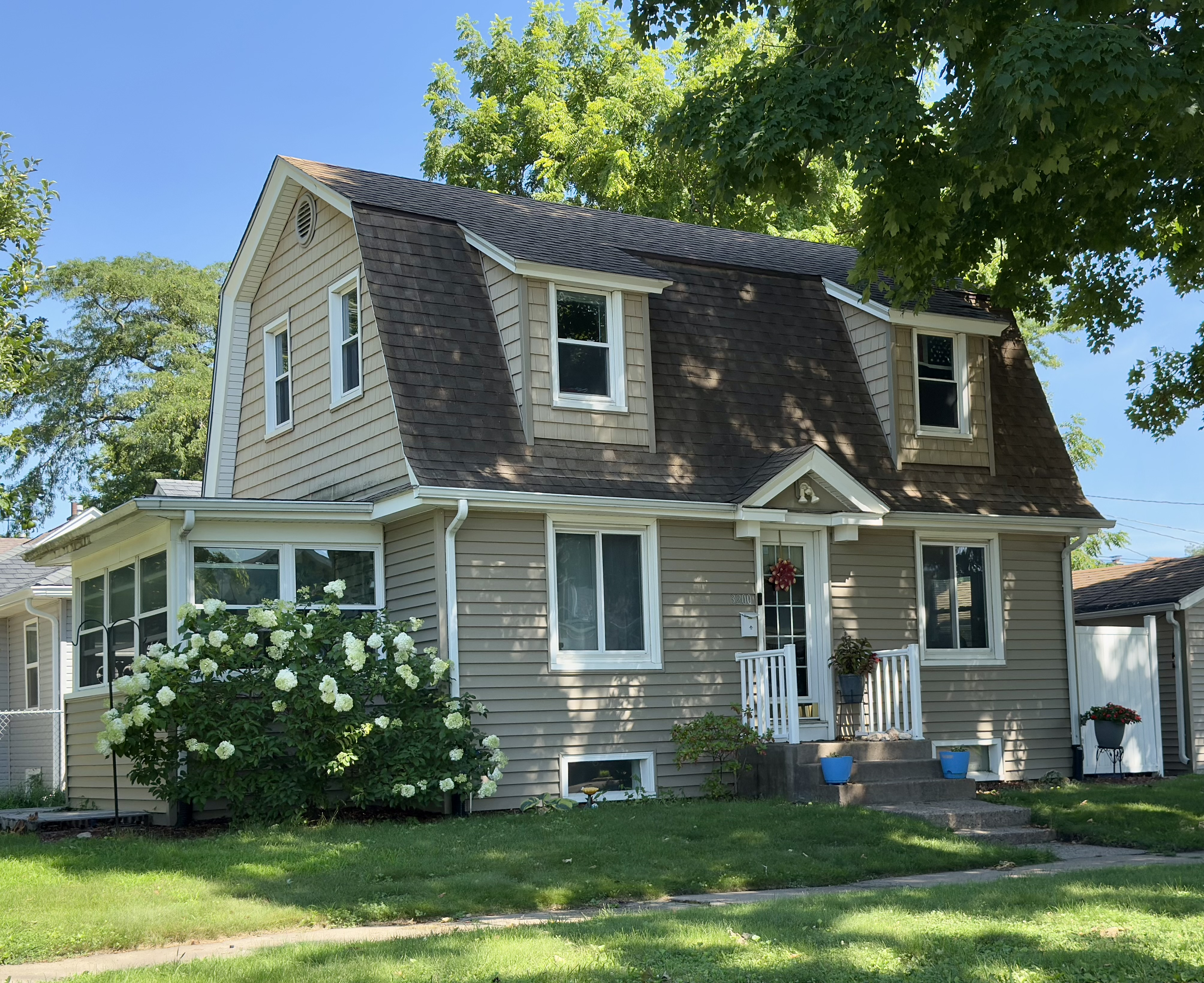
- House on 32nd Street in 2025

- Location within Illinois Location within the United States
- Location: Unit 1: Roughly bounded by 16th Avenue on the north, 31st Street on the west, 18th Avenue on the south, and 33rd Street on the east. Unit 2: Roughly bounded by 14th Avenue on the north, 39th Street on the west, 18th Avenue on the south, and 1st Street on the east, Rock Island, Illinois
- Coordinates: 41°29′39.8″N 90°33′21.2″W
- Area: 37.4 acres (15.1 ha)
- Built by: Henry W. Horst
- Architect: Cervin and Horn; George Kessler
- Architectural style: Queen Anne; Colonial Revival; American Craftsman
- NRHP reference No.: 100010709
- Added to NRHP: August 19, 2024

United States Housing Corporation (U.S.H.C.) Historic District is a nationally recognized historic district located in Rock Island, Illinois, United States. It was listed on the National Register of Historic Places in 2024.

The historic district is made up of two discontinuous units and it includes 393 resources, which consists of 206 contributing buildings and 187 non-contributing buildings. The houses that make up this district were part of 638 houses constructed between 1918 and 1919 by the United States Housing Corporation (U.S.H.C.) in the Tri-Cities, now known as the Quad Cities. The local project area was referred to as the Rock Island District. At the time, there was a housing shortage in the area and a significant number of new workers were needed at the Rock Island Arsenal and other area manufacturers to produce supplies and munitions for the United States Army during World War I. St. Louis landscape architect George Kessler was hired to plan the Rock Island development. Rock Island contractor Henry W. Horst built the houses designed by the local architectural firm of Cervin and Horn. The houses were both single-family detached and semi-detached houses. The Tri-Cities housing committee favored permanent housing over temporary, and the houses were designed in styles that were popular at the time.

The project came to an early end when the Armistice to end the war was signed in November 1918. The project in the city of Rock Island was far enough along that it was completed in full. It was one of the few U.S.H.C. projects in the country to be completed. Of the 900 houses planned in the Rock Island District, 110 houses were completed in neighboring Moline, 111 were completed in East Moline, 200 were completed in Rock Island, and 217 were completed across the Mississippi River in Davenport, Iowa. The houses in Iowa were designed by the architectural firm of Temple & Burrows and built by Central Engineering Company, both from Davenport. Initially, the houses were rented. The Rock Island District houses were the first U.S.H.C. houses to be sold, and this local sale set a pattern for the sale of the houses built in the rest of the country.
