= Longview Park Conservatory and Gardens =

City park in Rock Island, Illinois

Coordinates: 41.4951°N 90.5743°W

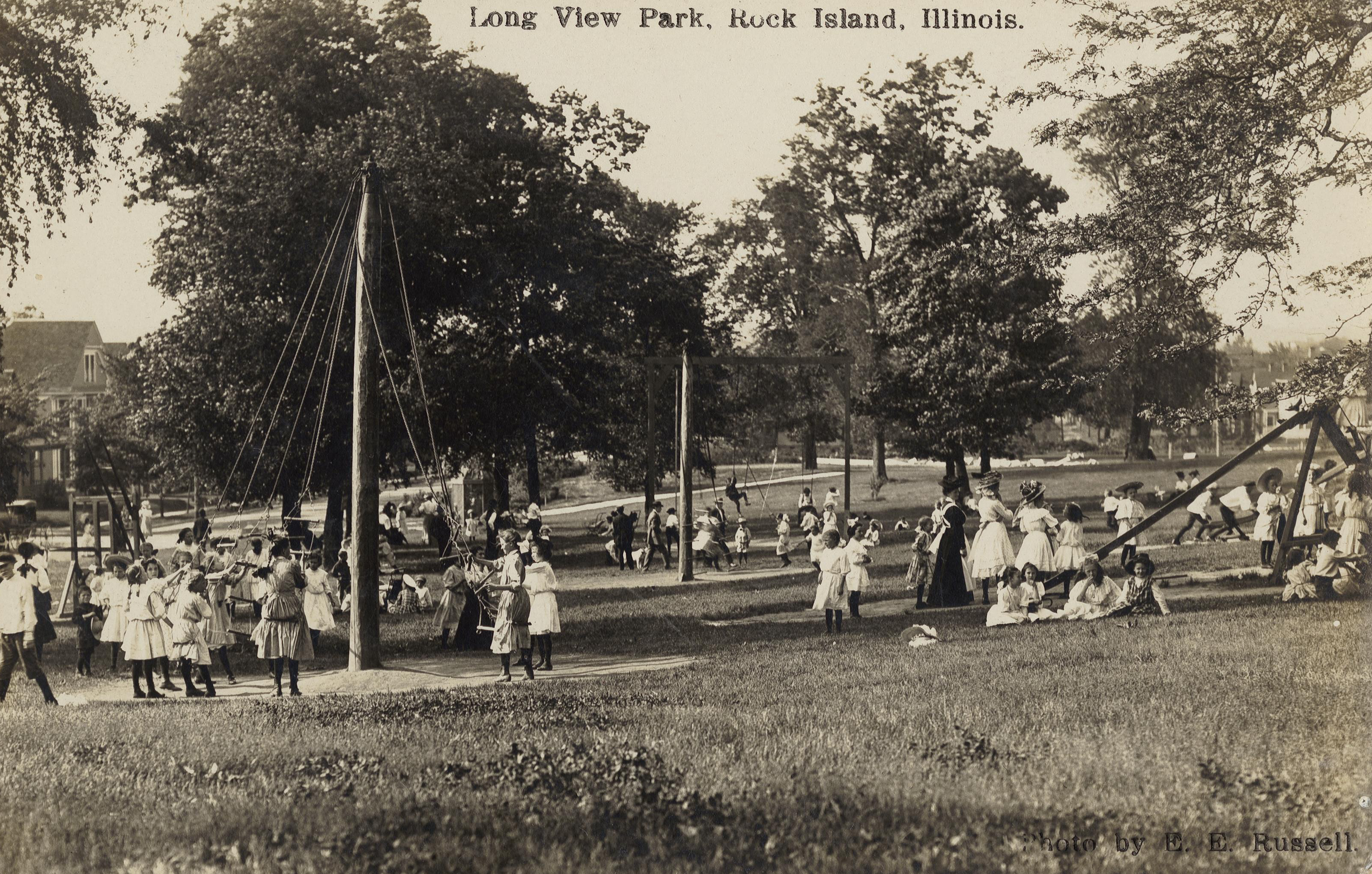
- May Day Celebrations in Long View Park, Rock Island, Illinois, c.1907-1914.
- Interactive map of Longview Park Conservatory and Gardens
- Type: City park
- Location: 1300 17th Street, Rock Island, Illinois
- Area: 39 acres (16 ha)

Longview Park Conservatory and Gardens (39 acres (16 ha)) is a city park located at 1300 17th Street, Rock Island, Illinois. It is open daily without charge.

The park includes a conservatory, greenhouse, flower gardens, playground equipment, picnic shelters, volleyball pit, swimming pool, tennis courts, and walking paths. The park's disc golf course is considered one of the best in the Quad Cities.

The Longview Conservatory was constructed in 1937 by workers from the Works Progress Administration. In 2009 it was designated as one of Rock Island's 100 Most Significant Unprotected Structures.

== See also ==
- List of botanical gardens in the United States
