= Davenport Skybridge =

Cable-stayed bridge in Davenport, Iowa, U.S.

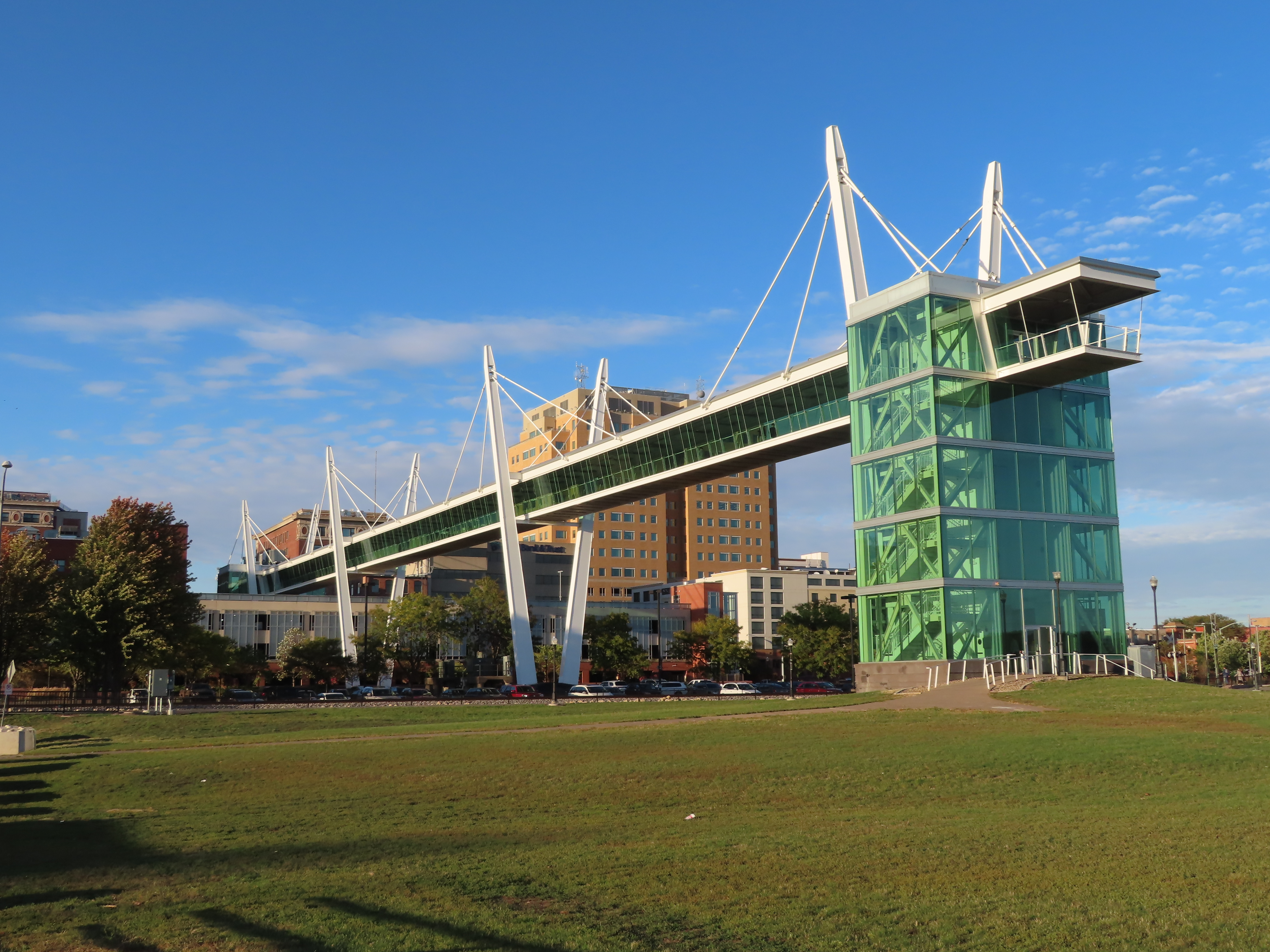
- Coordinates: 41°31′12″N 90°34′30″W
- Carries: Pedestrians
- Crosses: River Drive (Highway 67)
- Locale: Davenport, Iowa, U.S.

Characteristics
- Design: Cable-Stayed
- Total length: 575 feet
- Height: 50 feet

History
- Architect: Neumann Monson
- Designer: Holabird & Root
- Constructed by: Russell
- Construction cost: $7 million
- Opened: June 19, 2005

Location
- Interactive map of Davenport Skybridge

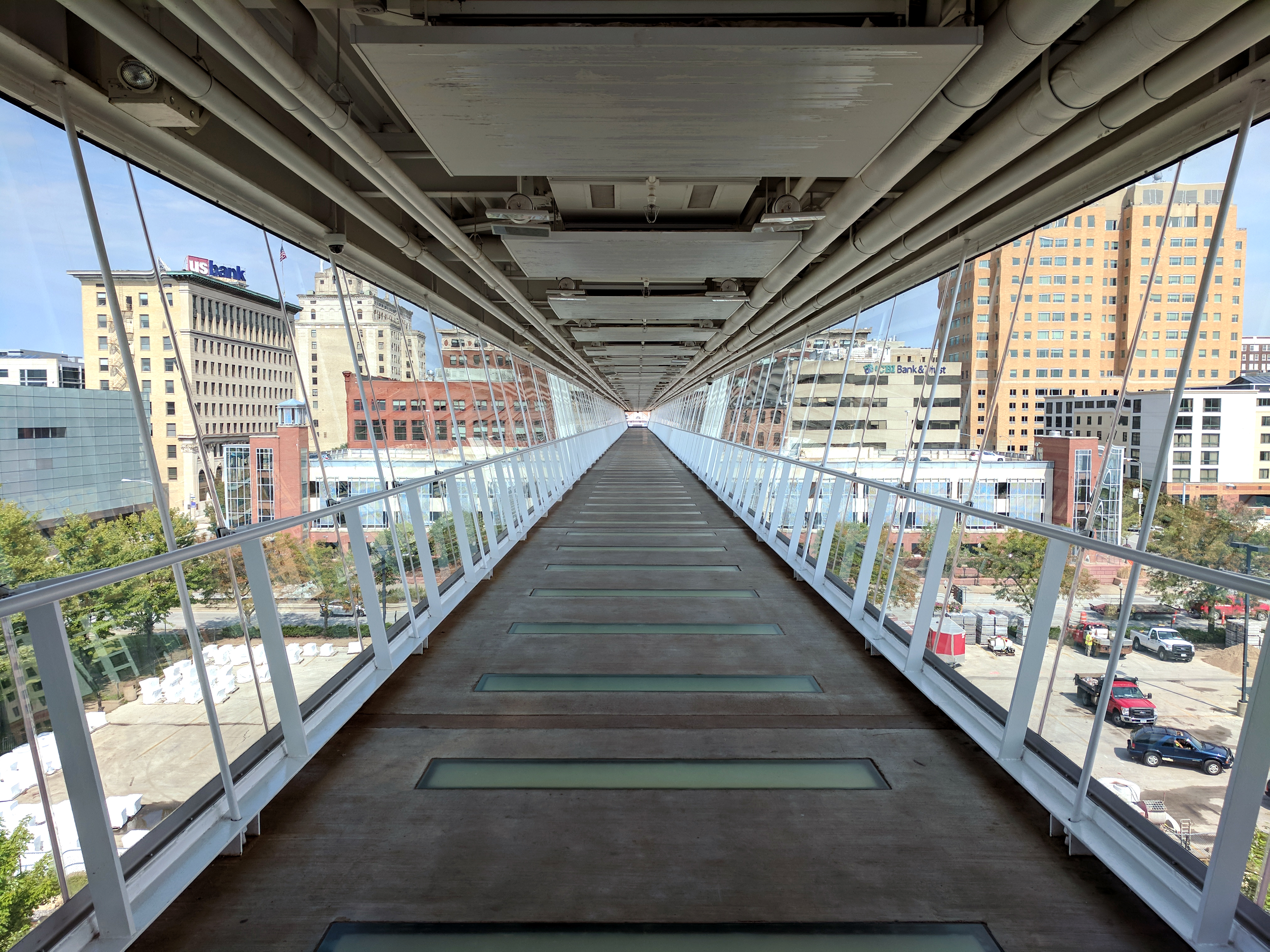
Skybridge interior during the day.

The Davenport Skybridge is a pedestrian cable-stayed bridge that spans River Drive (Highway 67) in downtown Davenport, Iowa, United States. It connects LeClaire Park to a courtyard and parking ramp on 2nd Street, located near the River Music Experience. The bridge, completed in 2005, is 50 feet (15 m) tall, 575 feet (175 m) long, and features 99 feet (30 m) columns. It was designed by Holabird & Root and Neumann Monson, P.C.

At the south end, facing the river, is an observation deck with a view of the Mississippi River, LeClaire Park Bandshell, the Centennial Bridge, and the Davenport Levee, where many festivals take place throughout the warmer months.

The inside of the Skybridge contains kaleidoscope lighting. The lighting consists of 228 LED fixtures and 8,036 individual lights. The LEDs are capable of displaying various patterns. The lighting color and patterns can be adjusted for events occurring in the area, such as a red, white, and blue color scheme for the Independence Day; red and green for Christmas; and various other patterns.

The Skybridge was a component of the Riverfront/Downtown Davenport improvement program, River Renaissance. The total cost of the structure was $7 million. Iowa taxpayers provided $3.5 million in the form of a Vision Iowa grant, Rhythm City Casino paid $2 million, and the City of Davenport taxpayers spent $500,000 for its initial construction. The Riverboat Development Authority, the agency responsible for distributing some of the taxes collected from Rhythm City, allocated $1.3 million. The bridge's stated purpose is to serve as a tourist attraction with a unique vantage point of the Mississippi River, while also functioning as a safe way to cross the highway.
