= Davenport, Iowa =

- City
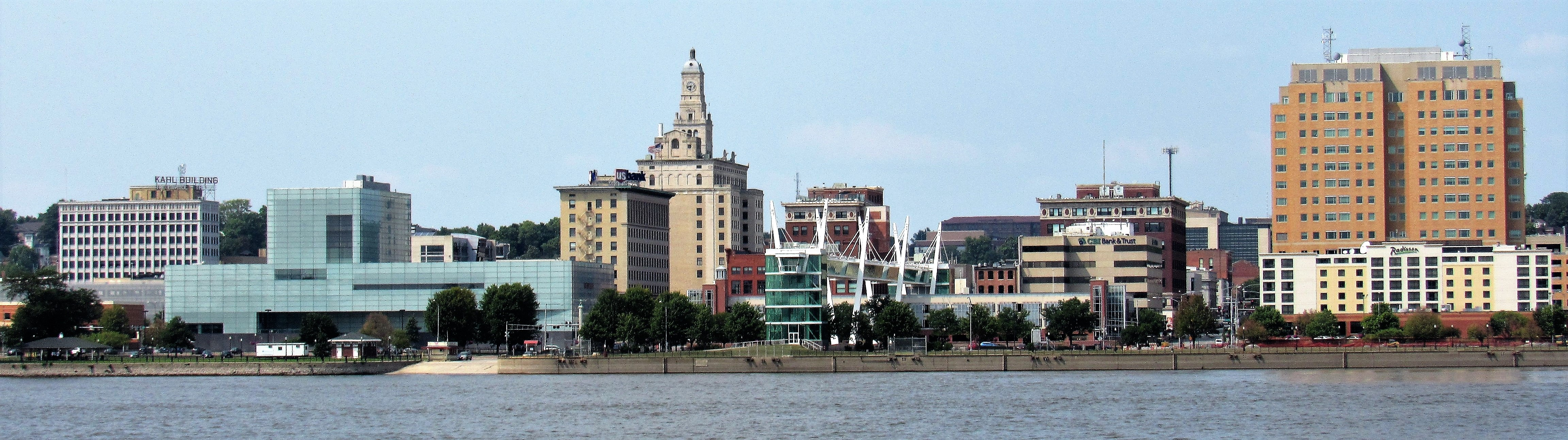
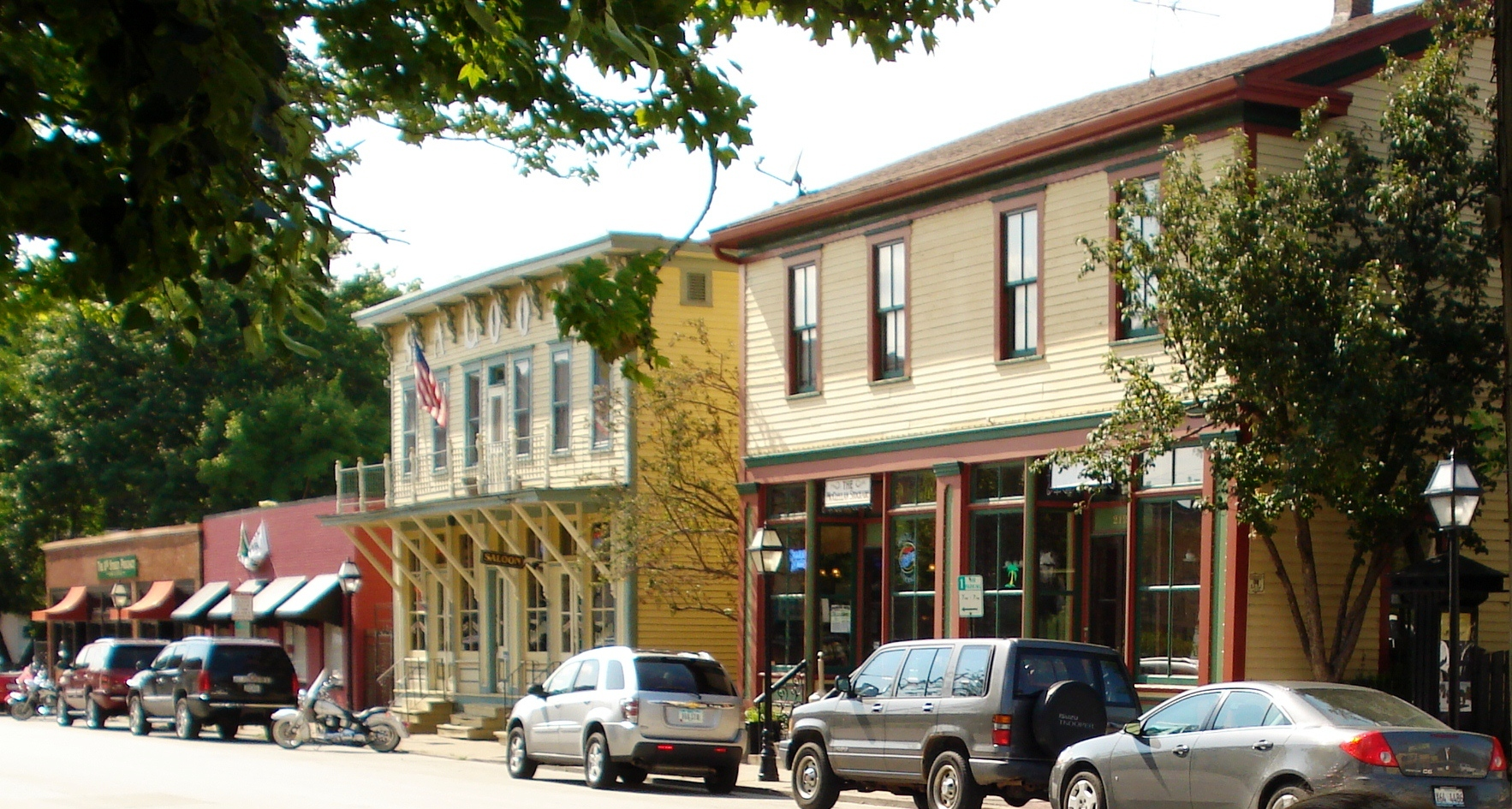
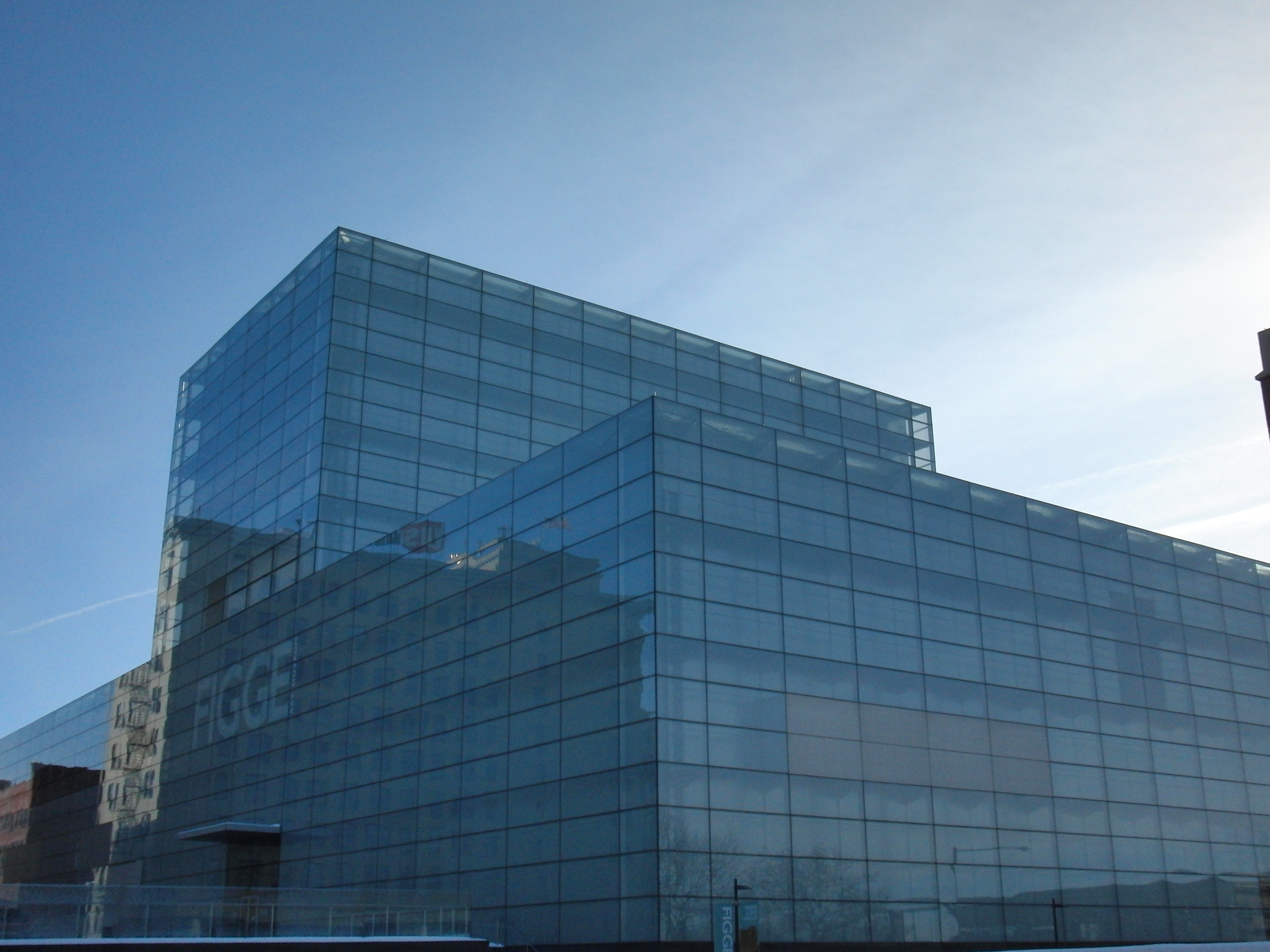
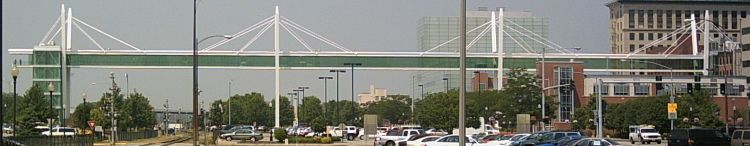
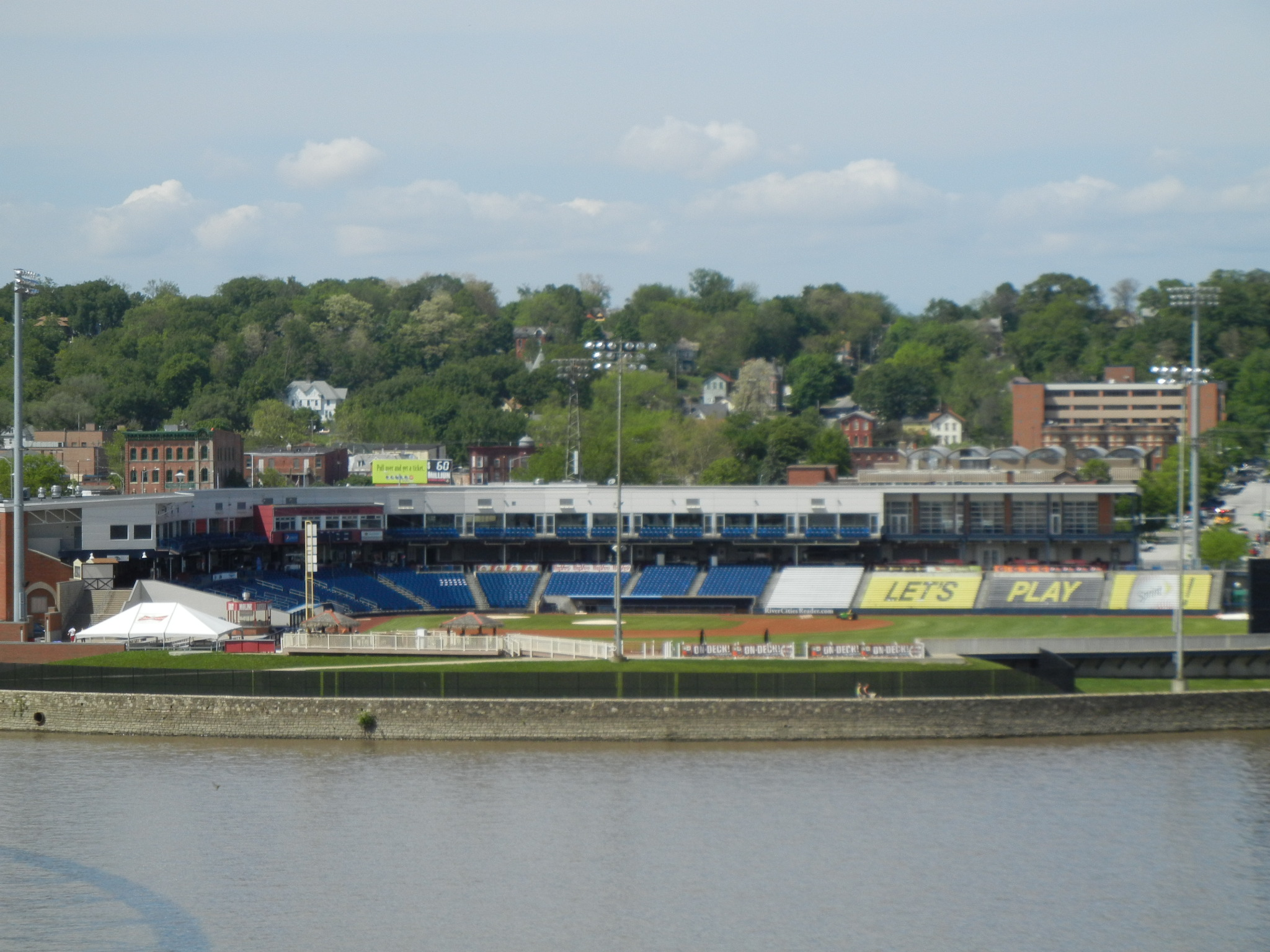
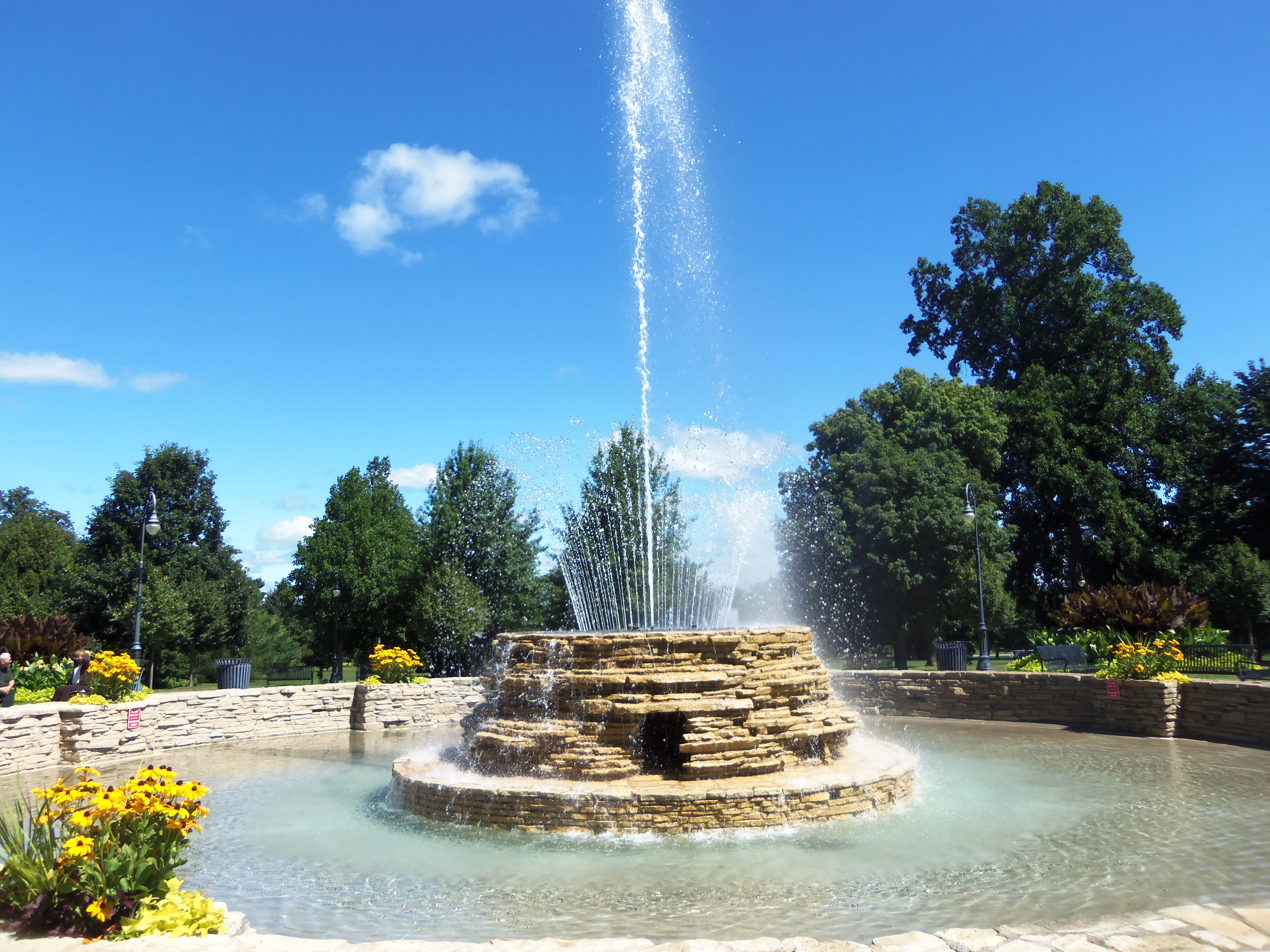
- The skyline of Downtown Davenport Village of East Davenport Figge Art Museum Davenport Skybridge Modern Woodmen Park Vander Veer Park

- Flag Seal Logo
- Nickname: The Most Livable Small City in America
- Interactive map of Davenport, Iowa
- Location within Iowa Location within the United States
- Coordinates: 41.55682°N 90.603948°W
- Country: United States
- State: Iowa
- County: Scott
- Settled: May 14, 1836
- Incorporated: January 25, 1839
- Named for: George Davenport

Government
  - Type: Mayor–Council
  - Mayor: Jason Gordon
  - City manager: Tim Gleason

Area
  - City: 66.333 sq mi (171.802 km^{2})
  - Land: 64.209 sq mi (166.300 km^{2})
  - Water: 2.124 sq mi (5.501 km^{2}) 3.2%
- Elevation: 660 ft (200 m)

Population (2020)
  - City: 101,724
  - Estimate (2024): 100,938
  - Rank: US: 340th IA: 3rd
  - Density: 1,584.27/sq mi (611.690/km^{2})
  - Urban: 285,211 (US: 142nd)
  - Urban density: 2,115/sq mi (816.6/km^{2})
  - Metro: 381,801 (US: 148th)
  - Metro density: 168.2/sq mi (64.94/km^{2})
  - Combined: 469,948 (US: 91st)
  - Combined density: 22,820/sq mi (8,812/km^{2})
- Demonym: Davenporter
- Time zone: UTC−6 (Central (CST))
  - Summer (DST): UTC−5 (CDT)
- ZIP Codes: 52801–52809
- Area code: 563
- FIPS code: 19-19000
- GNIS feature ID: 2394467
- Website: davenportiowa.com

Davenport (US: /ˈdævənpɔːrt/ DAV-ən-port) is a city in Scott County, Iowa, United States, and its county seat. The population was 101,724 at the 2020 census, and was estimated at 100,938 in 2024, making it the third-most populous city in Iowa, after Des Moines and Cedar Rapids. It is situated along the Mississippi River on the eastern border of the state. Together with Bettendorf, Iowa; Rock Island, Illinois; Moline, Illinois; and East Moline, Illinois, Davenport is one of the five Quad Cities in Iowa and Illinois. It is the largest city in the Quad Cities area, which has a metropolitan area population of 384,324 and a Combined statistical area population of 474,019 in the 2020 census.

Davenport was founded on May 14, 1836, by Antoine Le Claire and named for his friend, George Davenport. From 1860 until 1980, Davenport enjoyed a long period of industrial and population growth, averaging yearly increases of about 760 people. Over that period, Davenport industries were diverse, from manufacturing locomotives, a major meat-packing plant, a Caterpillar loader plant, a historic movie-projector plant, to car and truck wheel manufacture. These and other industries left, and since 1980, population growth has been flat, hovering around 100,000 over the past 40 years.

The city is prone to frequent flooding due to its location on the Mississippi River and the city's resistance to building a modern levee, unlike its sister cities. Davenport's flood wall dates from 1919, while Rock Island's higher flood wall dates from 1970 and Bettendorf's from the 1980s. The latter two protected their respective downtowns during the 2019 flood. The history and historical costs of proposed levee projects were summarized in 2023 by the local paper after Davenport received national media attention for the 2019 flood.

There are two main universities: St. Ambrose University and Palmer College of Chiropractic, where the first chiropractic adjustment took place. Several annual music festivals take place in Davenport, including the Mississippi Valley Blues Festival, the Mississippi Valley Fair, and the Bix Beiderbecke Memorial Jazz Festival. An internationally known 7-mile (11 km) foot race, called the Bix 7, is run during the festival. The city has a Class A minor-league baseball team, the Quad Cities River Bandits. Davenport has 50 plus parks and facilities, as well as more than 20 miles (32 km) of recreational paths for biking or walking.

Three interstates (I-80, I-74 and I-280) and two major United States Highways serve the city. Davenport has seen steady population growth since its incorporation. National economic difficulties in the 1980s resulted in job and population losses.

== History ==
The land was originally inhabited by the Sauk, Meskwaki, and Ho-Chunk peoples. France laid claim to this territory as part of its New France and Illinois Country in the 18th century. Its traders and missionaries came to the area from Canada (Quebec), but it did not have many settlers here. After losing to Great Britain in the Seven Years' War, France ceded its territory east of the Mississippi River to the British and transferred the lands to the west to Spain.

In 1803, France regained and sold its holdings in North America west of the Mississippi River to the United States under the Louisiana Purchase. Lieutenant Zebulon Pike was the first United States representative to officially visit the Upper Mississippi River area. On August 27, 1805, Pike camped on the present-day site of Davenport.

In 1832, a group of Sauk, Meskwaki, and Kickapoo were defeated by the United States in the Black Hawk War. The United States government concluded the Black Hawk Purchase, sometimes called the Forty-Mile Strip or Scott's Purchase, by which the US acquired lands in what is now eastern Iowa. The purchase was made for $640,000 on September 21, 1832, and contained an area of some 6 million acres (24,000 km^{2}), at a price equivalent to 11 cents/acre ($26/km^{2}). Although named after the defeated chief Black Hawk, he was being held prisoner by the US. Sauk chief Keokuk, who had remained neutral in the war, signed off on the purchase. It was made on the site of present-day Davenport. Army General Winfield Scott and Governor of Illinois, John Reynolds, acted on behalf of the United States, with Antoine Le Claire, a mixed-race (Métis) man, serving as translator. He later was credited with founding Davenport.

Chief Keokuk gave a generous portion of land to Antoine Le Claire's wife, Marguerite, the granddaughter of a Sauk chief. Le Claire built their home on the exact spot where the agreement was signed, as stipulated by Keokuk, or he would have forfeited the land. Le Claire finished the 'Treaty House' in the spring of 1833. He founded Davenport on May 14, 1836, naming it for his friend Colonel George Davenport, who was stationed at Fort Armstrong during the war. The city was incorporated on January 25, 1839. The area was successively governed by the legislatures of the Michigan Territory, the Wisconsin Territory, the Iowa Territory, and finally Iowa.

Scott County was formed by an act of the Wisconsin Territorial legislature in 1837. Both Davenport and its neighbor Rockingham campaigned to become the county seat. The city with the most votes from Scott County citizens in the February 1838 election would become the county seat. On the eve of the election, Davenport citizens acquired the temporary service of Dubuque laborers so they could vote in the election. Davenport won the election with the help of the laborers. Rockingham supporters protested the elections to the territorial governor, on the grounds the laborers from Dubuque were not Scott County residents. The governor refused to certify the results of the election. A second election was held the following August. To avoid another import of voters, the governor set a 60-day residency requirement for all voters. Davenport won by two votes. Because the margin of victory was so close, a third election was held in the summer of 1840. As the August election drew nearer, Rockingham residents grew tired of the county seat cause. Davenport easily won the third election. Consequently, to avoid questions about the county seat, Davenport quickly built the first county courthouse.

The Rock Island Railroad built the first railroad bridge across the Mississippi River in 1856. It connected Davenport to Rock Island, Illinois. This railway connection resulted in significant improvements to transportation and commerce with Chicago, a booming 19th-century city. The addition of new railroad lines to Muscatine and Iowa City, and the acquisition of other lines by the Rock Island Railroad, resulted in Davenport becoming a commercial railroad hub.

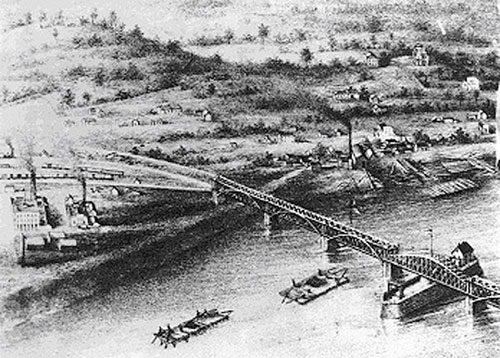
Aerial view of early Davenport c. 1850s

Steamboat companies rightly saw nationwide railroads as a threat to their business. On May 6, 1856, just weeks after the bridge was completed, a steamboat captain deliberately crashed the Effie Afton into the bridge. The owner of the Effie Afton, John Hurd, filed a lawsuit against the Rock Island Railroad Company. Abraham Lincoln was the lead defense lawyer for the railroad company. The hung jury meant that neither party was awarded damages; the bridge was repaired within the span of a few months, and no further intentional sabotage was pursued. However, further litigation continued for many years, until ultimately the United States Supreme Court upheld the right to bridge navigable streams; the bridge, and others like it that had been built in the interim, were allowed to remain.

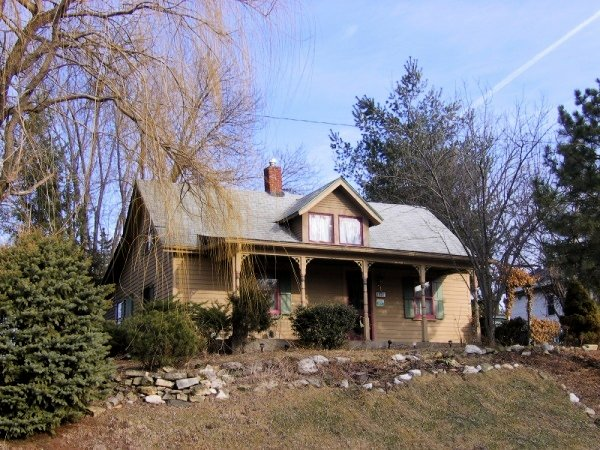
The Claim House was constructed by George L. Davenport, son of Colonel George Davenport, in 1832 or 1833. It is believed to be the oldest structure in the city.

Prior to the start of the Civil War, Governor Samuel J. Kirkwood declared Davenport to be Iowa's first military headquarters; five military camps were set up in the city to aid the Union.

The Davenport City Hall was built in 1895 for price of $100,000 ($3.87 million in 2025 dollars). Architectural journals of the time poked fun at the project due to the small amount of money budgeted. The skyline began forming in the 1920s with the construction of the Kahl Building, the Parker Building, and the Capitol Theatre during a period of economic and building expansion.

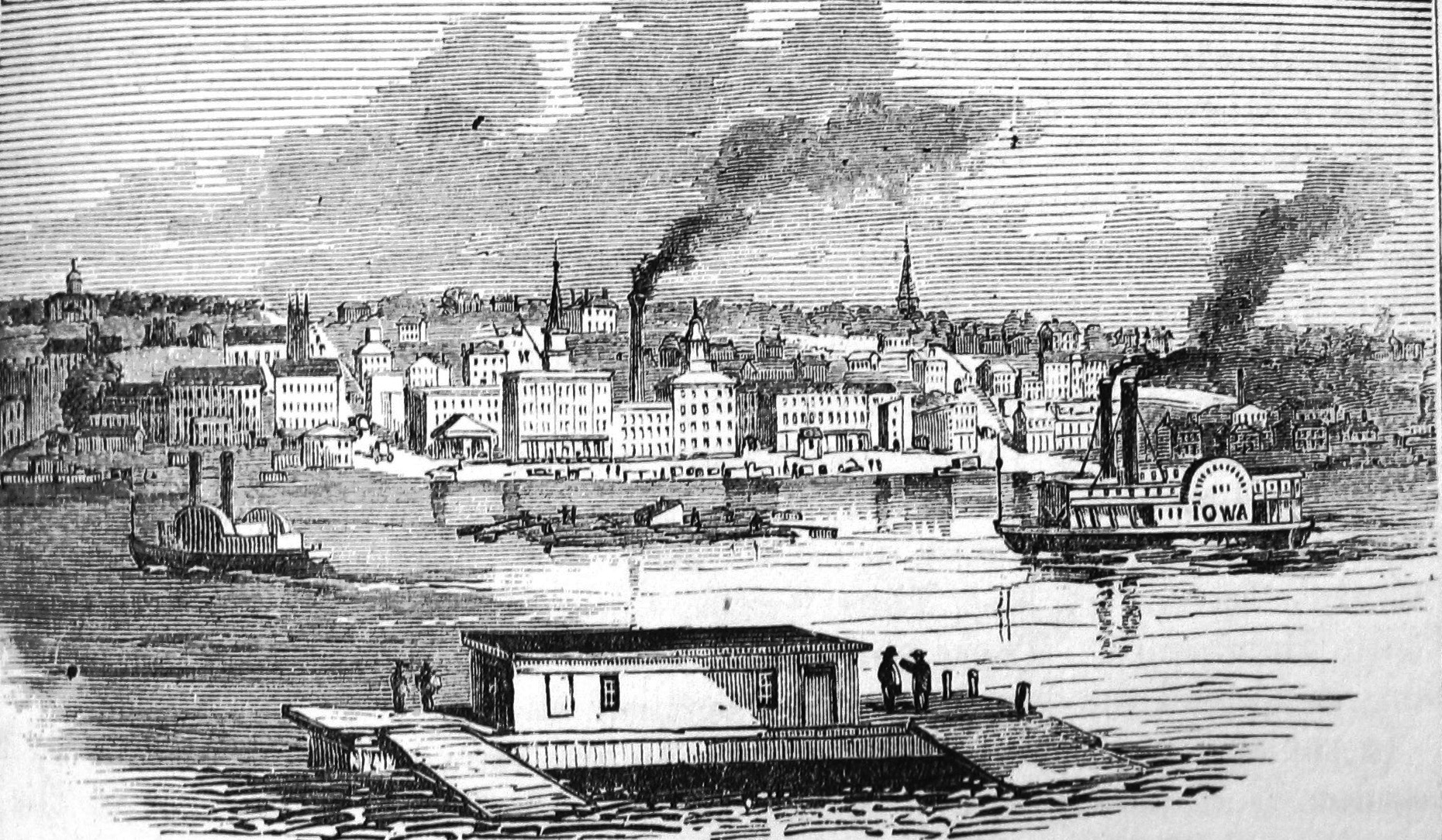
Picture of Davenport in 1865; on the right is the Steamboat Iowa, which appears in the Seal of Iowa.

By 1932, thousands of Davenport residents were on public relief, due to the Great Depression. A shantytown of the poor developed in the west end of the city, along the Mississippi River. Sickness, hunger, and unsanitary living conditions plagued the area.

The situation would soon change, as many citizens went to work for the Works Progress Administration. Davenport had an economic boom during and after World War II, driven by wartime industry and peacetime demand. As Davenport grew, it absorbed smaller surrounding communities, annexing Rockingham, Nahant, Probstei, East Davenport, Oakdale, Cawiezeel, Blackhawk, Mt. Joy, Green Tree, and others. Oscar Mayer, Ralston Purina, and other companies built plants in west Davenport. The Interstate highway network reached Davenport in 1956, improving transportation in the area. By 1959, more than 1,000 homes a year were being constructed.

By the late 1970s, the good times were over for both downtown and local businesses and industries. Railroad restructuring in the mid-20th century had caused a loss of jobs in the industry. The farm crisis of the 1980s negatively affected Davenport and the rest of the Quad Cities, where a total of 35,000 workers lost their jobs throughout the entire Quad Cities area. Restructuring of heavy industry also continued: the Caterpillar plant on the city's north side closed, causing another wave of job loss.

With the 1990s, the city finally showed the beginnings of a resurgence. In the early 21st century, many renovations and building additions have occurred to revitalize the downtown area, including repairing Modern Woodmen Park, the building of the Skybridge, and establishing the Figge Art Museum. In 2011, the Gold Coast and Hamburg Historic District was named as a 2011 "America's Great Place" by the American Planning Association.

== Geography ==
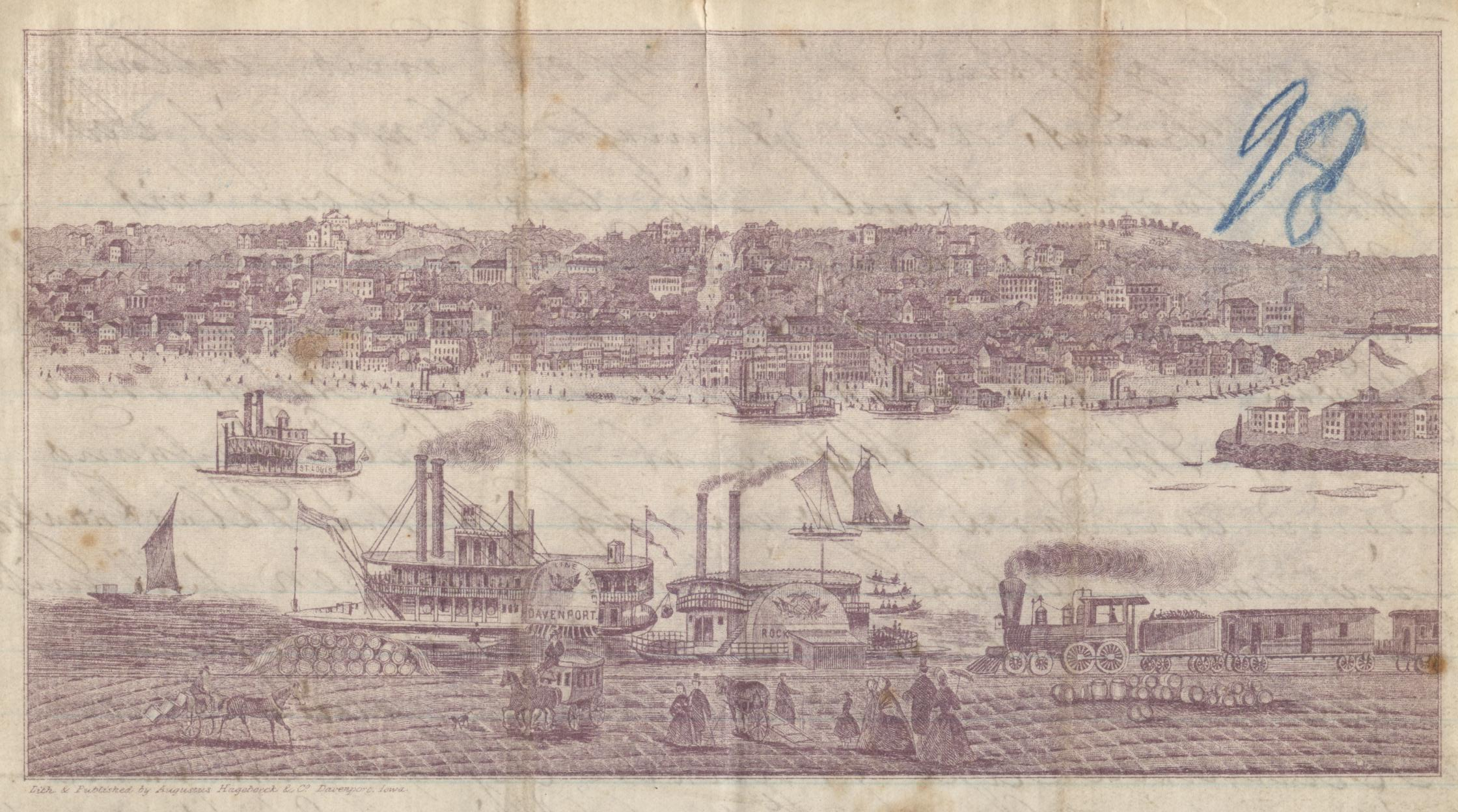
Lithograph of Davenport from a letter-head dating to 1868

According to the United States Census Bureau, the city has a total area of 66.333 square miles (171.80 km^{2}), of which 64.209 square miles (166.30 km^{2}) is land and 2.124 square miles (5.50 km^{2}) (3.2%) is water. Davenport is located approximately 170 miles (270 km) west of Chicago and 170 miles (270 km) east of the Iowa state capital of Des Moines. The city is located about 200 miles (320 km) north of St. Louis, Missouri, and 265 miles (426 km) southeast of Minneapolis, Minnesota. Farmland surrounds Davenport outside the Quad Cities area.

Davenport is located on the banks of the Mississippi River. At this point the river has a maximum depth of around 30 to 40 feet (9.1 to 12.2 m) and is 2,217 feet (676 m) wide where the Centennial Bridge crosses it. The river flows from east to west in this area, as opposed to its usual north to south direction. From the river the city starts to slope north up a hill, which is steep at some points. The streets of the city, especially downtown and in the central part of the town, follow a grid design.

Davenport often makes national headlines when it suffers seasonal flooding by the Mississippi River. It is the largest city bordering the Mississippi that has no permanent flood wall or levee. Davenport residents prefer to maintain open access to the river for parks and vistas rather than have it cut off by dikes and levees. Davenport has adopted ordinances requiring any new construction in the floodplain to be elevated above the 100-year-flood level or protected with walls. As a result, former mayor Phil Yerington said that if they "let Mother Nature take her course, we'll all be better off". An example of a Davenport building that is elevated or flood-proofed is the Figge Art Museum.

=== Climate ===
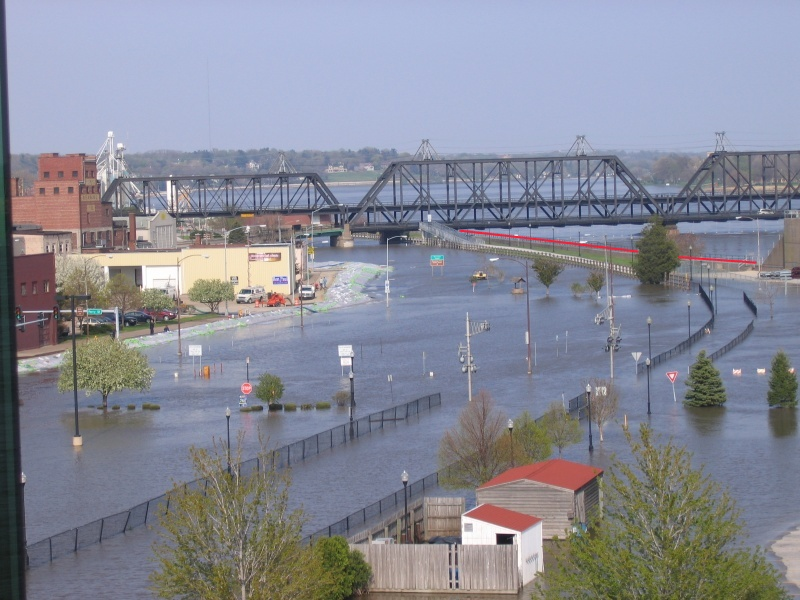
Flooding on April 30, 2008. The red line (at the top right) indicates where the Mississippi River should be. The picture was taken from the Skybridge.

Under the Köppen climate classification, Davenport is considered to have a humid continental climate (Dfa). Summers are very warm to hot with high levels of humidity. Winters have cold temperatures and often high winds, with snow likely from November through February. Average snowfall in Davenport is 30.7 inches (780 mm) per year. January is on average the coldest month, while July is the warmest. The highest temperature recorded in Davenport was 111 °F (44 °C) on July 12, 1936. The lowest temperature, −29 °F (−34 °C), was recorded on January 18, 2009. Substantial weather changes frequently occur at three- to four-day intervals as a result of mid-latitude storm tracks, which is where low and high pressure extratropical disturbances occur. During the summers, farmers experience difficulties while farming such as shallow soil, the humidity, and cold damp winds

Although several minor tornadoes have occurred, no devastating tornado has ever touched down in Davenport. Flooding, however, is often a problem in Davenport due to the lack of a flood wall. During the Great Flood of 1993, the water crested at 22.63 feet (6.90 m) on July 9. This is nearly 8 feet (2.4 m) above the 14.9-foot (4.5 m) flood stage. Major flooding in Davenport causes many problems. Roads in and around the downtown area, including U.S. Route 67, are closed and cause increased traffic on other city roads. The effects of major flooding can be long-lasting. For example, during the 2008 flooding, Credit Island in the city's southwest corner remained closed for 5½ months while crews worked on cleaning up damage and removing river debris. Duck Creek, a stream situated in Bettendorf and Davenport, is also vulnerable to flash flooding. Severe thunderstorms on June 16, 1990, created heavy flash flooding in Bettendorf and Davenport that killed four people. Another major flood happened on June 12, 2008, when severe thunderstorms caused Duck Creek to overflow its banks and flood properties and nearby streets (see Iowa flood of 2008). The Mississippi river flooded again in 2019 and 2023.

Climate data for Davenport, IA (1991-2020), snow at municipal airport for 2005-2023
| Month | Jan | Feb | Mar | Apr | May | Jun | Jul | Aug | Sep | Oct | Nov | Dec | Year |
|---|---|---|---|---|---|---|---|---|---|---|---|---|---|
| Mean daily maximum °F (°C) | 29.9 (−1.2) | 34.4 (1.3) | 48.3 (9.1) | 61.4 (16.3) | 72.5 (22.5) | 81.3 (27.4) | 83.8 (28.8) | 82.0 (27.8) | 76.2 (24.6) | 63.4 (17.4) | 48.3 (9.1) | 35.1 (1.7) | 59.7 (15.4) |
| Daily mean °F (°C) | 21.9 (−5.6) | 26.3 (−3.2) | 38.6 (3.7) | 50.3 (10.2) | 61.7 (16.5) | 71.1 (21.7) | 73.7 (23.2) | 71.7 (22.1) | 64.6 (18.1) | 52.5 (11.4) | 39.2 (4.0) | 27.6 (−2.4) | 49.9 (10.0) |
| Mean daily minimum °F (°C) | 14.0 (−10.0) | 18.1 (−7.7) | 29.0 (−1.7) | 39.3 (4.1) | 51.0 (10.6) | 60.9 (16.1) | 63.6 (17.6) | 61.5 (16.4) | 53.0 (11.7) | 41.7 (5.4) | 30.0 (−1.1) | 20.1 (−6.6) | 40.2 (4.6) |
| Average precipitation inches (mm) | 1.14 (29) | 1.44 (37) | 2.34 (59) | 3.61 (92) | 4.82 (122) | 4.73 (120) | 4.07 (103) | 3.96 (101) | 3.47 (88) | 2.70 (69) | 2.25 (57) | 1.64 (42) | 36.17 (919) |
| Average snowfall inches (cm) | 9.0 (23) | 9.6 (24) | 4.2 (11) | 0.6 (1.5) | 0.0 (0.0) | 0.0 (0.0) | 0.0 (0.0) | 0.0 (0.0) | 0.0 (0.0) | 0.6 (1.5) | 2.0 (5.1) | 9.0 (23) | 35 (89.1) |
| Average extreme snow depth inches (cm) | 5 (13) | 6 (15) | 3 (7.6) | 0 (0) | 0 (0) | 0 (0) | 0 (0) | 0 (0) | 0 (0) | 0 (0) | 1 (2.5) | 4 (10) | 6 (15) |
| Average precipitation days (≥ 0.01 in) | 7.6 | 8 | 10 | 11.8 | 12.8 | 13.3 | 10.6 | 13.2 | 10.2 | 9.5 | 8.2 | 9 | 124.2 |
| Average snowy days (≥ 0.1 in) | 7 | 7 | 3 | 1 | 0 | 0 | 0 | 0 | 0 | 1 | 2 | 6 | 27 |
Source: NOAA (snowfall, snow depth and snow days)

Climate data for Quad Cities (Quad City International Airport), 1991–2020 normals, (Note: Mean monthly maxima and minima (i.e. the expected highest and lowest temperature readings at any point during the year or given month) calculated based on data at said location from 1991 to 2020.) extremes 1871–present (Note: Official precipitation records for the Quad Cities kept at the Weather Bureau Office (WBO) in Davenport, Iowa from July 1871 to December 1931, alternating between Quad City Int'l (KMLI) and the Davenport WBO from January 1932 to 17 February 1937, and remaining at KMLI since 18 February 1937. Temperature, snowfall, and snow depth records date to 1 January 1874, 1 August 1882, and 1 January 1901, respectively. For more information, see Threadex)
| Month | Jan | Feb | Mar | Apr | May | Jun | Jul | Aug | Sep | Oct | Nov | Dec | Year |
|---|---|---|---|---|---|---|---|---|---|---|---|---|---|
| Record high °F (°C) | 69 (21) | 79 (26) | 88 (31) | 93 (34) | 104 (40) | 104 (40) | 111 (44) | 106 (41) | 100 (38) | 95 (35) | 80 (27) | 75 (24) | 111 (44) |
| Mean maximum °F (°C) | 53.4 (11.9) | 57.6 (14.2) | 73.6 (23.1) | 82.7 (28.2) | 89.2 (31.8) | 94.0 (34.4) | 95.1 (35.1) | 93.8 (34.3) | 91.2 (32.9) | 84.1 (28.9) | 69.8 (21.0) | 57.6 (14.2) | 96.9 (36.1) |
| Mean daily maximum °F (°C) | 31.8 (−0.1) | 36.6 (2.6) | 49.9 (9.9) | 63.0 (17.2) | 73.9 (23.3) | 83.1 (28.4) | 86.1 (30.1) | 84.1 (28.9) | 77.9 (25.5) | 64.8 (18.2) | 49.8 (9.9) | 37.0 (2.8) | 61.5 (16.4) |
| Daily mean °F (°C) | 23.3 (−4.8) | 27.7 (−2.4) | 39.7 (4.3) | 51.4 (10.8) | 62.5 (16.9) | 72.1 (22.3) | 75.5 (24.2) | 73.4 (23.0) | 66.1 (18.9) | 53.7 (12.1) | 40.4 (4.7) | 28.9 (−1.7) | 51.2 (10.7) |
| Mean daily minimum °F (°C) | 14.8 (−9.6) | 18.8 (−7.3) | 29.6 (−1.3) | 39.9 (4.4) | 51.1 (10.6) | 61.0 (16.1) | 64.9 (18.3) | 62.7 (17.1) | 54.2 (12.3) | 42.6 (5.9) | 30.9 (−0.6) | 20.8 (−6.2) | 40.9 (4.9) |
| Mean minimum °F (°C) | −9.4 (−23.0) | −2.3 (−19.1) | 9.6 (−12.4) | 24.7 (−4.1) | 35.2 (1.8) | 48.0 (8.9) | 54.0 (12.2) | 52.1 (11.2) | 39.1 (3.9) | 26.3 (−3.2) | 14.1 (−9.9) | −0.2 (−17.9) | −14.2 (−25.7) |
| Record low °F (°C) | −33 (−36) | −28 (−33) | −19 (−28) | 7 (−14) | 25 (−4) | 39 (4) | 46 (8) | 40 (4) | 24 (−4) | 11 (−12) | −10 (−23) | −24 (−31) | −33 (−36) |
| Average precipitation inches (mm) | 1.66 (42) | 1.83 (46) | 2.62 (67) | 3.81 (97) | 4.67 (119) | 5.01 (127) | 4.23 (107) | 3.97 (101) | 3.32 (84) | 2.81 (71) | 2.30 (58) | 2.04 (52) | 38.27 (972) |
| Average snowfall inches (cm) | 10.8 (27) | 8.6 (22) | 4.4 (11) | 1.1 (2.8) | 0.0 (0.0) | 0.0 (0.0) | 0.0 (0.0) | 0.0 (0.0) | 0.0 (0.0) | 0.3 (0.76) | 2.1 (5.3) | 8.8 (22) | 36.1 (92) |
| Average precipitation days (≥ 0.01 in) | 9.3 | 8.7 | 10.4 | 11.3 | 12.2 | 11.3 | 8.6 | 9.4 | 8.4 | 9.0 | 8.9 | 9.5 | 117.0 |
| Average snowy days (≥ 0.1 in) | 7.2 | 6.0 | 3.2 | 0.8 | 0.0 | 0.0 | 0.0 | 0.0 | 0.0 | 0.3 | 1.7 | 5.9 | 25.1 |
| Average relative humidity (%) | 69.9 | 69.8 | 68.3 | 64.3 | 64.9 | 65.8 | 70.5 | 73.3 | 72.8 | 68.1 | 71.3 | 74.0 | 69.4 |
| Average dew point °F (°C) | 11.7 (−11.3) | 16.2 (−8.8) | 27.0 (−2.8) | 37.2 (2.9) | 48.2 (9.0) | 57.9 (14.4) | 64.0 (17.8) | 62.6 (17.0) | 54.3 (12.4) | 41.5 (5.3) | 30.4 (−0.9) | 18.3 (−7.6) | 39.1 (3.9) |
| Mean monthly sunshine hours | 148.1 | 153.8 | 180.5 | 210.1 | 255.1 | 284.6 | 301.9 | 271.4 | 222.0 | 192.9 | 121.7 | 113.9 | 2,456 |
| Percentage possible sunshine | 50 | 52 | 49 | 53 | 57 | 63 | 66 | 63 | 59 | 56 | 41 | 40 | 55 |
Source: NOAA (relative humidity, dew point, and sun 1961−1990)

=== Neighborhoods ===
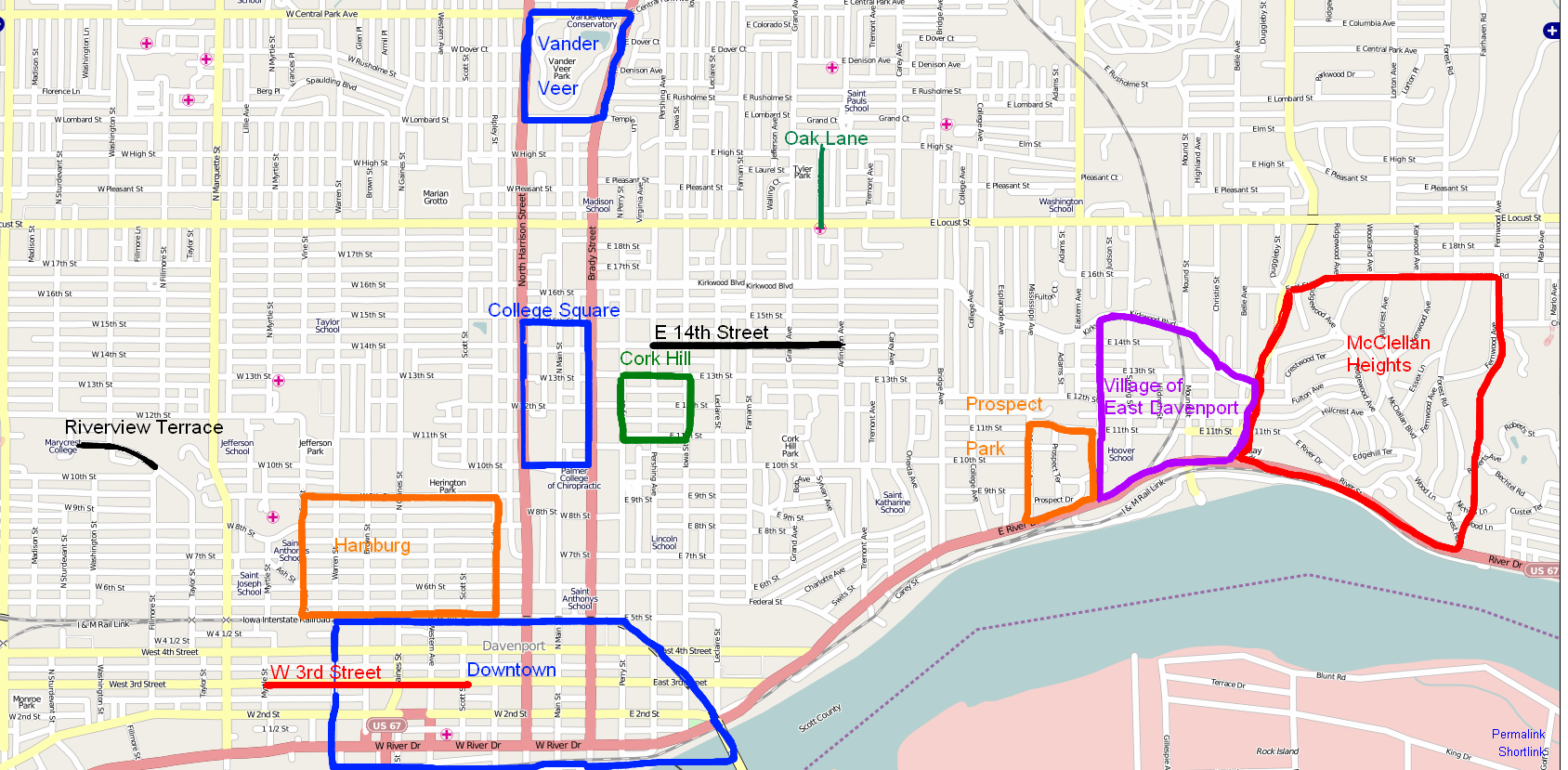
Map highlighting the historic neighborhoods

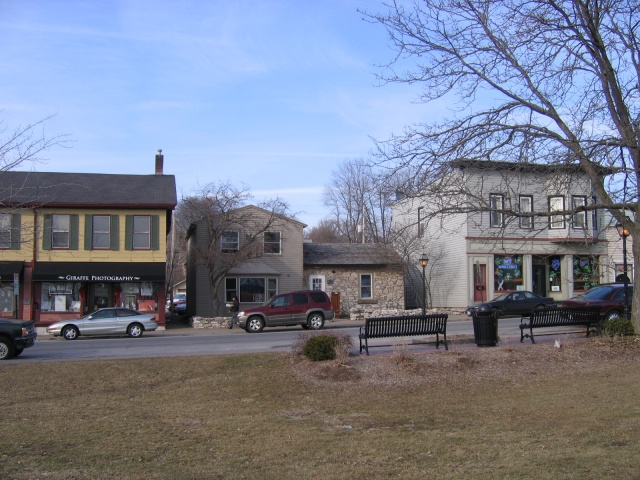
One of Davenport's oldest neighborhoods, the Village of East Davenport, is full of small specialty shops.

Davenport has several neighborhoods dating back to the 1840s. The original city plot was around current day Ripley and 5th Streets, where Antoine Le Claire had built his house. The city can be divided into five areas: downtown, central, east end, near north and northwest, and west end. Many architectural designs are found throughout the city including Victorian, Queen Anne, Tudor Revival, and others. Many of the original neighborhoods were inhabited by German settlers.

The east side of the city dates back to 1850 and has always contained higher-end housing. The proximity and commanding view of the river kept these neighborhoods a fashionable address, long after the original families departed. Lindsay Park, in The Village of East Davenport, was used as parade grounds for Civil War soldiers from Camp McClellan.

In contrast to the east side, the central and west neighborhoods originally contained many of the working class Germans who settled the town. Development on the west side started in the 1850s, with extensive construction occurring in the 1870s. Housing was mostly one and a half to two-story front gable American Foursquare and simplified Queen Anne style. The central Hamburg neighborhood, now known as the Hamburg Historic District, contains the most architecturally significant residences in the old German neighborhoods. Also in central Davenport, the Vander Veer Park Historic District is a neighborhood anchored by Vander Veer Park, a large park with a botanical garden and a fountain. The park was modeled after New York City's Central Park and originally shared its name. Vander Veer is surrounded by large Queen Anne and Tudor Revival style houses that were built between 1895 and 1915. Development of the Vander Veer Park was one of the first major beautification efforts.

Today, the eastern side of Davenport still contains many of the higher class houses in the city. The old Civil War parade grounds, in The Village of East Davenport ("The Village" for short), have been turned into Lindsay Park, which is surrounded by small specialty shops. West of The Village, Downtown contains the two tallest buildings in the Quad Cities; the Wells Fargo Bank Building, which is 255 feet tall, and the Mid-American Energy Building, which is 220 feet tall. Other tall buildings include the 11-story Hotel Blackhawk, the 150-foot Kahl Building and the Davenport City Hall.

== Demographics ==
Historical population
| Census | Pop. | Note | %± |
|---|---|---|---|
| 1850 | 1,848 | | — |
| 1860 | 11,267 | | 509.7% |
| 1870 | 20,038 | | 77.8% |
| 1880 | 21,831 | | 8.9% |
| 1890 | 26,872 | | 23.1% |
| 1900 | 35,254 | | 31.2% |
| 1910 | 43,028 | | 22.1% |
| 1920 | 56,727 | | 31.8% |
| 1930 | 60,751 | | 7.1% |
| 1940 | 66,039 | | 8.7% |
| 1950 | 74,549 | | 12.9% |
| 1960 | 88,981 | | 19.4% |
| 1970 | 98,469 | | 10.7% |
| 1980 | 103,264 | | 4.9% |
| 1990 | 95,333 | | −7.7% |
| 2000 | 98,359 | | 3.2% |
| 2010 | 99,685 | | 1.3% |
| 2020 | 101,724 | | 2.0% |
| 2024 (est.) | 100,938 | | −0.8% |
U.S. Decennial Census; 2020 Census

According to realtor website Zillow, the average price of a home as of December 31, 2025, in Davenport is $179,841.

As of the 2024 American Community Survey, there are 42,463 estimated households in Davenport with an average of 2.30 persons per household. The city has a median household income of $64,686. Approximately 14.9% of the city's population lives at or below the poverty line. Davenport has an estimated 63.1% employment rate, with 29.8% of the population holding a bachelor's degree or higher and 91.0% holding a high school diploma. There were 45,814 housing units at an average density of 713.51 per square mile (275.5/km^{2}).

The median age in the city was 37.3 years.

Davenport, Iowa – racial and ethnic composition Note: the US Census treats Hispanic/Latino as an ethnic category. This table excludes Latinos from the racial categories and assigns them to a separate category. Hispanics/Latinos may be of any race.
| Race / ethnicity (NH = non-Hispanic) | Pop. 1990 | Pop. 2000 | Pop. 2010 | Pop. 2020 | % 1990 | % 2000 | % 2010 | % 2020 |
|---|---|---|---|---|---|---|---|---|
| White alone (NH) | 83,147 | 79,972 | 76,404 | 72,246 | 87.22% | 81.31% | 76.65% | 71.02% |
| Black or African American alone (NH) | 7,423 | 8,917 | 10,465 | 11,833 | 7.79% | 9.07% | 10.50% | 11.63% |
| Native American or Alaska Native alone (NH) | 344 | 303 | 270 | 223 | 0.36% | 0.31% | 0.27% | 0.22% |
| Asian alone (NH) | 974 | 1,947 | 2,140 | 2,224 | 1.02% | 1.98% | 2.15% | 2.19% |
| Pacific Islander alone (NH) | — | 21 | 36 | 35 | — | 0.02% | 0.04% | 0.03% |
| Other race alone (NH) | 145 | 138 | 128 | 292 | 0.15% | 0.14% | 0.13% | 0.29% |
| Mixed race or multiracial (NH) | — | 1,793 | 2,987 | 5,890 | — | 1.82% | 3.00% | 5.79% |
| Hispanic or Latino (any race) | 3,300 | 5,268 | 7,255 | 8,981 | 3.46% | 5.36% | 7.28% | 8.83% |
| Total | 95,333 | 98,359 | 99,685 | 101,724 | 100.00% | 100.00% | 100.00% | 100.00% |

=== 2024 estimate ===
As of the 2024 estimate, there were 100,938 people, 42,463 households, and _ families residing in the city. The population density was 1,572.02 inhabitants per square mile (607.0/km^{2}). There were 45,814 housing units at an average density of 713.51 per square mile (275.5/km^{2}). The racial makeup of the county was % White (% NH White), % African American, % Native American, % Asian, % Pacific Islander, _% from some other races and % from two or more races. Hispanic or Latino people of any race were % of the population.

=== 2020 census ===
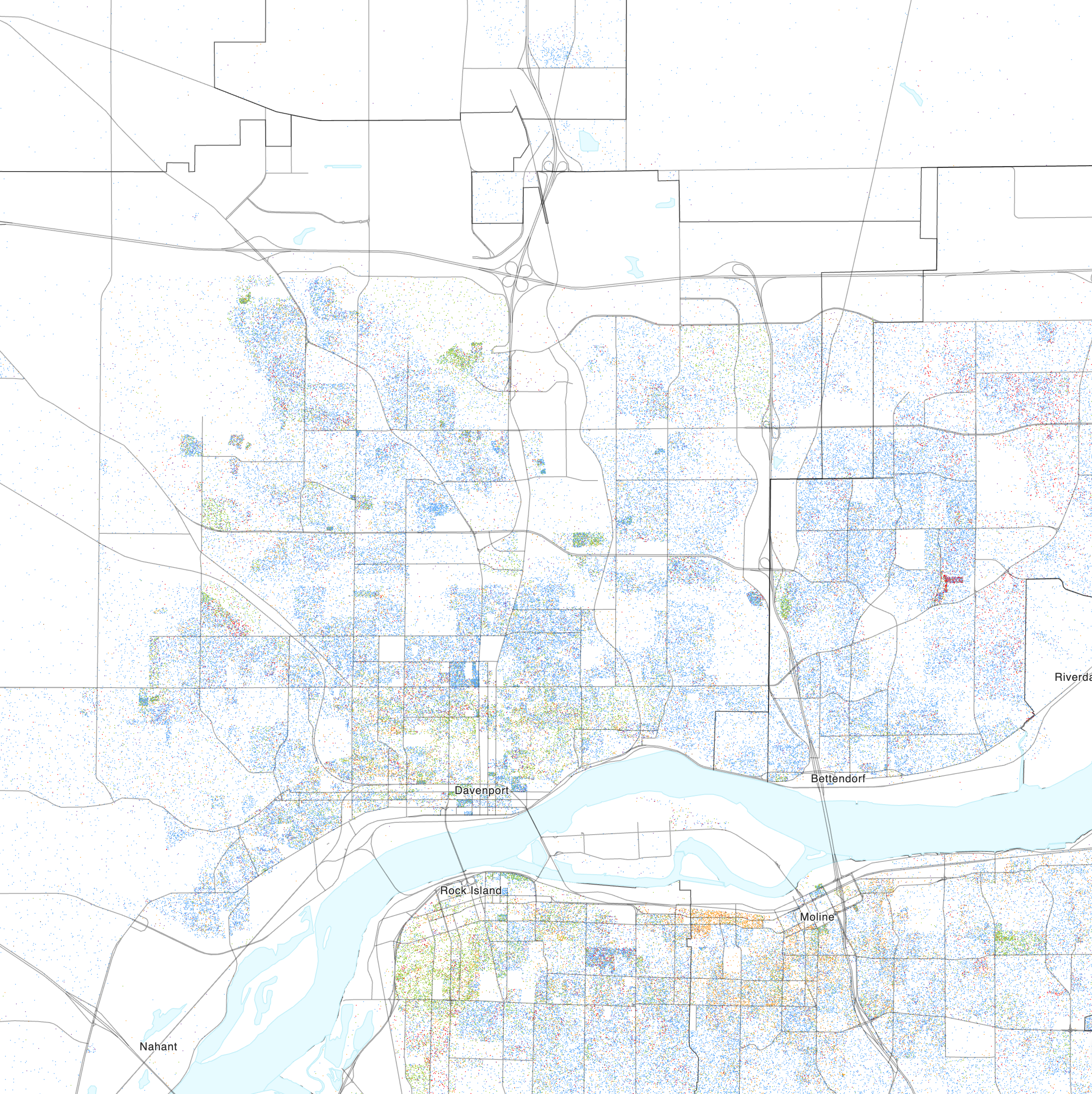
Map of racial distribution in Davenport, 2020 U.S. census. Each dot is one person: ⬤ White ⬤ Black ⬤ Asian ⬤ Hispanic ⬤ Multiracial ⬤ Native American/Other

As of the 2020 census, there were 101,724 people, 42,679 households, and 24,669 families residing in the city. The population density was 1,594.55 inhabitants per square mile (615.7/km^{2}). There were 46,964 housing units at an average density of 736.17 per square mile (284.2/km^{2}). The racial makeup of the city was 74.06% White, 11.98% African American, 0.43% Native American, 2.20% Asian, 0.04% Pacific Islander, 2.57% from some other races and 8.73% from two or more races. Hispanic or Latino people of any race were 8.83% of the population.

=== 2010 census ===
As of the 2010 census, there were 99,685 people, 40,620 households and _ families residing in the city. The population density was 1,583.61 inhabitants per square mile (611.4/km^{2}). There were 44,087 housing units at an average density of 700.37 per square mile (270.4/km^{2}). The racial makeup of the city was 80.66% White, 10.79% African American, 0.38% Native American, 2.18% Asian, 0.05% Pacific Islander, 2.10% from some other races and 3.85% from two or more races. Hispanic or Latino people of any race were 7.28% of the population.

=== 2000 census ===
As of the 2000 census, there were 98,359 people, 39,124 households, and 24,804 families residing in the city. The population density was 1,566.46 inhabitants per square mile (604.8/km^{2}). There were 41,350 housing units at an average density of 658.54 per square mile (254.3/km^{2}). The racial makeup of the city was 83.68% White, 9.24% African American, 0.37% Native American, 2.00% Asian, 0.02% Pacific Islander, 2.32% from some other races and 2.36% from two or more races. Hispanic or Latino people of any race were 5.36% of the population.

There were 39,124 households out of which 31.8% have children under the age of 18 living with them, 46.0% were married couples living together, 13.4% have a female householder with no husband present, and 36.6% were non-families. 29.5% of all households were made up of individuals and 9.4% have someone living alone who was 65 years of age or older. The average household size was 2.44 and the average family size was 3.03.

In the city the population was spread out with 26.2% under the age of 18, 10.7% from 18 to 24, 30.1% from 25 to 44, 20.9% from 45 to 64, and 12.1% who were 65 years of age or older. The median age was 34 years. For every 100 females there were 94.7 males. For every 100 females age 18 and over, there were 90.9 males.

The median income for a household in the city was $37,242, and the median income for a family was $45,944. Males have a median income of $34,153 versus $24,634 for females. The per capita income for the city was $18,828. 14.1% of the population and 10.5% of families were below the poverty line. Out of the total population, 19.2% of those under the age of 18 and 6.4% of those 65 and older were living below the poverty line.

== Economy ==
Davenport's biggest labor industry is manufacturing, with over 7,600 jobs in the sector. John Deere is the second largest employer in the Quad Cities, after the Rock Island Arsenal as a whole. Deere, however, is the largest single employer, employing 7,200 workers in the Quad Cities and 948 on its north side Davenport plant. John Deere World Headquarters is located in Moline. Other large employers in Davenport and the Quad Cities include, Genesis Health System with 5,125 employees and 4,900 in Davenport, Trinity Regional Health System with 3,333, regional grocery store Hy-Vee with 3,138 and the Davenport Community School District with 2,237 employees.

Davenport is the headquarters for department store Von Maur, which has 24 stores. Davenport is also the headquarters of Lee Enterprises, which publishes fifty daily newspapers and more than 300 weekly newspapers, shoppers, and specialty publications, along with online sites in 23 states. As of September 2009, the unemployment rate in Davenport and the rest of the Quad Cities, had risen to 8.4%.

The surrounding Quad Cities have major places of employment, including the Rock Island Arsenal, KONE, Inc and Alcoa.

== Arts and culture ==
=== Landmarks ===
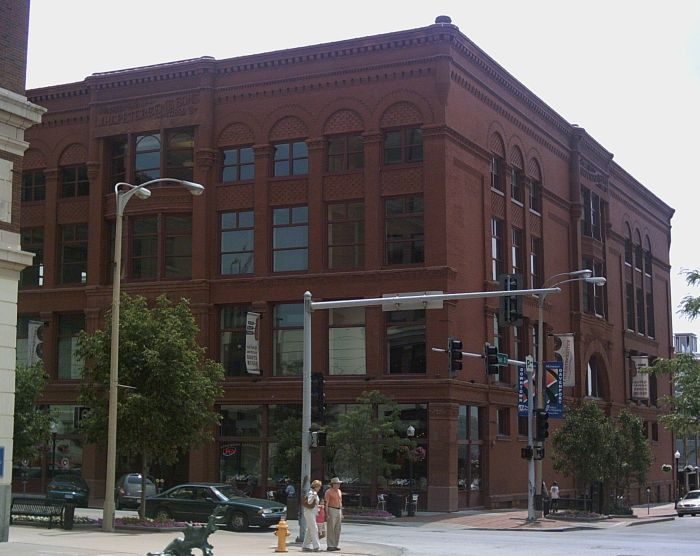
The Redstone Building was originally the longtime home of the Petersen Harned Von Maur flagship store and is now home of the River Music Experience.

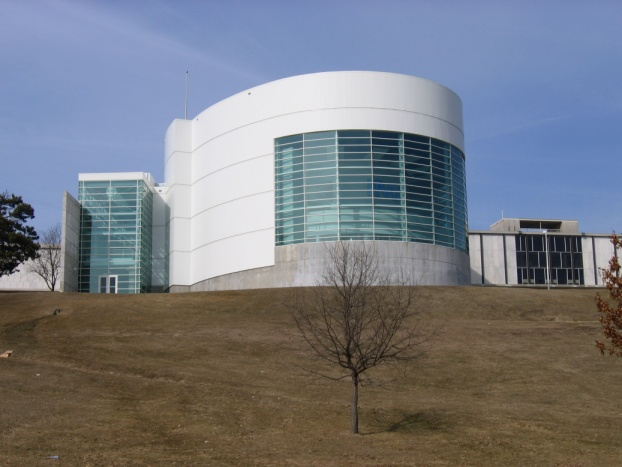
The Putnam Museum

Downtown Davenport has many points of interest including the Davenport Public Library, the Davenport Skybridge, Figge Art Museum, River Music Experience, Putnam Museum, the RiverCenter/Adler Theater, Modern Woodmen Park which is home of the Quad City River Bandits baseball team and the Centennial Bridge. The former Chicago, Milwaukee, St. Paul and Pacific Freight House, now known as The Freight House, is home to several small businesses featuring locally grown items, such as a deli, a grocery hub, and a tap room for a local brewery.

Davenport's cultural and educational institutions include the Figge Art Museum, which houses The National Center for Midwest Art and Design, and was founded in 1925 as the Davenport Municipal Art Gallery. The Putnam Museum, which was founded in 1867 and was one of the first museums west of the Mississippi River. The Quad City Symphony Orchestra, headquartered in downtown Davenport, was founded in 1915. The Davenport Public Library was opened in 1839. The German American Heritage Center is located at the foot of the Centennial Bridge.

Uptown features a few historic landmarks such as the Iowa Soldiers' Orphans' Home which took in homeless children from all of Iowa's ninety-nine counties following the Civil War and Ambrose Hall which was the original building of St. Ambrose University. Aside from landmarks, uptown contains some entertainment venues too, such as the Great Mississippi Valley Fairgrounds, which hosts fairs, stock car racing, and many other events. NorthPark Mall is the city's main shopping mall and has 160 stores. Its companion, SouthPark Mall, is located in Moline. Brady Street Stadium is home to Davenport high school and Saint Ambrose University football games. Davenport has a number of parks, including Credit Island park which has a bike path, baseball diamonds, tennis courts, and fishing along the Mississippi River. Vander Veer Botanical Park has a small botanical garden and also features a walking path, a lagoon, and a large fountain. The Stampe Lilac Garden is located in Duck Creek Park, on Locust St.

=== Events and festivals ===
Bix Fest is a three-day music festival with many traditional jazz bands held in tribute to internationally renowned jazz cornetist, pianist, composer, and Davenport native Bix Beiderbecke. The festival was started in August 1971 and the Bix Beiderbecke Memorial Society was founded one year later to organize and sponsor it. 2009 was the 39th consecutive festival. In addition to the Bix Fest, the Wells Fargo Street Fest features live music, food, and vendors.

The annual Bix 7 is a 7-mile (11 km) road race held in late July in Davenport. The race was founded in 1975 by John A. Hudetz a resident of Bettendorf, Iowa, who wanted to bring to the Quad Cities some of the excitement he felt when he ran his first Boston Marathon. The first race had 84 participants, but today 12,000 to 18,000 runners take part. In late July or early August the six-day Great Mississippi Valley Fair features major grandstand concerts, carnival rides, attractions, and food vendors. Sturgis on the River is a large annual gathering of motorcycles which includes bands and food vendors. Other local expositions include River Roots Live, Beaux Arts Fair and many others.

=== Livability Award ===
Davenport (along with neighboring Rock Island, Illinois), won the 2007 City Livability Award in the small-city category from the U.S. Conference of Mayors. Tom Cochran, executive director of the Conference, stated that the award "gives the Conference a chance to highlight mayoral leadership in making urban areas safer, cleaner and more livable." The award acknowledges achievements from the RiverVision plan of Davenport and Rock Island.

== Sports ==
Davenport and the Quad Cities are home to many sports teams. The Quad Cities River Bandits baseball team play games at Downtown Davenport's Modern Woodmen Park. The TaxSlayer Center in Moline is home the Quad City Steamwheelers indoor football team and the Quad City Storm hockey team. Davenport high schools are in the Mississippi Athletic Conference for sports.

== Parks and recreation ==
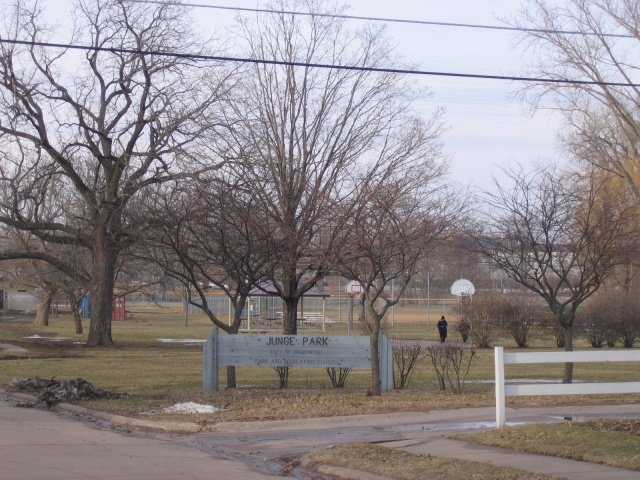
Junge Park is situated along the Duck Creek bike path. The park includes baseball and softball fields, along with sand volleyball, and basketball courts.

Davenport has over fifty parks or recreational trails. Major parks include Credit Island, which is a 450-acre (1.8 km^{2}) park in southwest Davenport located alongside the Mississippi River. Fejervary Park contains a pool and has had approximately 20,000 visitors each year since 1996. Junge Park is situated along the Duck Creek Parkway and includes baseball and softball fields, sand volleyball, and basketball courts. LeClaire Park is located right on the banks of the Mississippi River next to Modern Woodmen Park and hosts many summer events including River Roots Live and Ribfest. Bands for the Bix Fest play in the park each July. Vander Veer Botanical Park welcomes approximately 25,000 visitors to continuous floral shows.

The city features two recreational trails for biking or walking. Duck Creek Parkway extends from Emeis Park in west Davenport 8.26 miles (13.29 km) east to Bettendorf along Duck Creek. Riverfront Parkway extends 4.75 miles (7.64 km) along the Mississippi waterfront from Credit Island to Bettendorf. Both these trails continue into Bettendorf. Plans are being discussed to connect the two trails in Riverdale. Three public golf courses are offered in the city. For river-related activities, The Channel Cat boat offers rides across the river and has two stops in Iowa and three stops in Illinois and connects the bike paths that each state has on its river front.

== Government ==
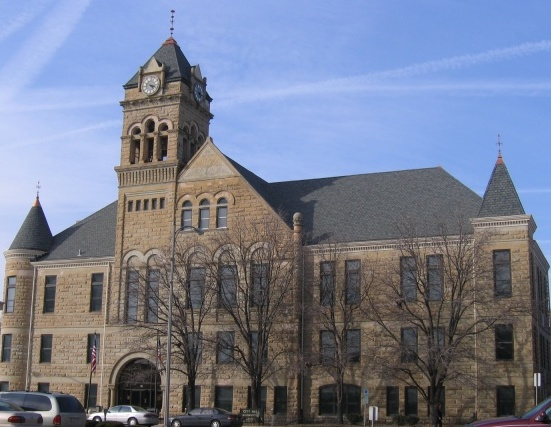
Davenport City Hall was built in 1895 at the price of $100,000.

Davenport uses a mayor–council form of local government. As of 2021, city government consists of mayor Mike Matson and a ten-person council. One person is elected from each of the eight wards and two at-large aldermen are elected to represent the whole city. Nonpartisan elections are held in odd-numbered years. The mayor is the top elected individual for the city and presides over city council meetings, voting in case of a tie. The mayor appoints city board members. The city council's job is to make laws and set the city budget. The city administrator, currently Corrin Spiegel, is appointed by the mayor with confirmation by two-thirds of the council. Citywide goals through 2012 include having a financially responsible government, having a growing economy, revitalizing neighborhoods, and upgrading city infrastructure and public facilities. The establishment of Davenport as a political and government unit came in 1839, three years after the city was settled. The city was incorporated as a result of a resolution by Iowa Representative Jonathan W. Parker by special charter in the Iowa Territory on January 25, 1839. Parker was a resident of Davenport and one of six trustees elected to govern the city with Rodolphus Bennet being the first mayor. Activity for the first four months was minimal as the council failed to meet. In 1842, the city charter was amended for the first time. Changes include having six alderman replace the five trustees, dividing the city into three wards, and appointing a city clerk position to replace the recorder. The charter was amended again in 1851 to expand the city area, provide greater detail of the duties of the mayor, city council, and other officials. During the last half of the 19th century, government assumed expanding responsibilities for public welfare and public works improvements.

The city expanded police protection, even temporarily having volunteer police officers to assist the three paid officers. Fire protection was expanded in 1882, with the city's first 13 paid firefighters. Former mayor Henry Vollmer accomplished several public works achievements, including large street paving and new sub-divisions being plotted. A large city budget surplus brought the creation of the Davenport City Hall. After 1900, each mayor brought new agendas for city improvement. Waldo Becker encouraged new railroads for the city. He also promised a more business-like government, in terms of financial responsibility and to depoliticize the police department. In the mid-1920s the city established the first zoning ordinances, electrical traffic signals and street lighting. The city also expanded with the incorporation of the city of Rockingham and the establishment of the Davenport Municipal Airport.

The 2010 fiscal year budget was $199.2 million, an increase of $35 million from 2009. The city's general fund receives the largest amount of funds from property taxes, followed by service fees such as solid waste collection and swimming pool or golf course admission and 80% of its expenses go to personnel costs. The city has given a few surveys for citizens to rate the quality of life and city services. The largest department in the city is the public works department with a budget of $36.7 million. The police department is second with a budget of $22.4 million, while the fire department has a budget of $15 million. The parks department has $6.1 million, and the Davenport Public Library has a $3.8 million budget.

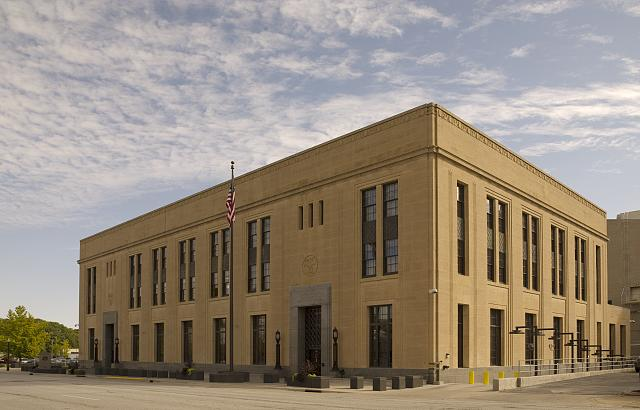
The U.S. Courthouse in Davenport

At the federal level, Davenport is in Iowa's 1st congressional district. It is represented by Republican Mariannette Miller-Meeks. The two Senators are Republicans Chuck Grassley and Joni Ernst. At the state level, Davenport is represented by the 45th, 46th, and 47th Iowa Senate districts and in the Iowa House of Representatives by the 89th, 90th, 92nd, 93rd, and 94th districts.

As of 2012, the 41st senate district covers the eastern third of the city and all of Bettendorf, Riverdale, and Panorama Park. It is more conservative than other Davenport districts being represented by a Republican since the 1970s. The district is slightly moving more liberal with an increase of 3,000 Democrats between 2006 and 2010. The district is represented by Republican Senator Roby Smith. The 42nd district covers the western third of the city along with all of Scott County that is not in Davenport, Bettendorf, Riverdale, or Panorama Park as well as western and southern rural Clinton County and is represented by Republican Senator Shawn Hamerlinck. The 43rd senate district covers the central third of the city and is represented by Democrat Joe Seng.

The 81st house district covers the eastern third of the city along with small western portion of Bettendorf. The district shares the same western boundaries as the forty-first senate district. The district is represented by Democrat Phyllis Thede. The 84th district covers the western third of the city, and has the same eastern boundary as Senate district forty-two and is represented by Republican Ross Paustian. The 85th and 86th districts are made up of the same area as the forty-third senate district. The 85th district covers the north and west-central area while the 86th district covers southern and eastern part of the senate district. Both are represented by Democrats with Jim Lykam representing the 85th and Cindy Winckler representing the 86th.

Davenport has a Federal Court House for the United States District Court for the Southern District of Iowa.

US House of Representatives
| Name | Congressional District | Party |
|---|---|---|
| Mariannette Miller-Meeks | 1st District | Republican |

Iowa Senate
| Name | District | Party |
|---|---|---|
| Jim Lykam | District 45 | Democratic |
| Mark S. Lofgren | District 46 | Republican |
| Roby Smith | District 47 | Republican |

Iowa House of Representatives
| Name | District | Party |
|---|---|---|
| Monica Kurth | District 89 | Democratic |
| Cindy Winckler | District 90 | Democratic |
| Ross Paustian | District 92 | Republican |
| Phyllis Thede | District 93 | Democratic |
| Gary Mohr | District 94 | Republican |

== Education ==
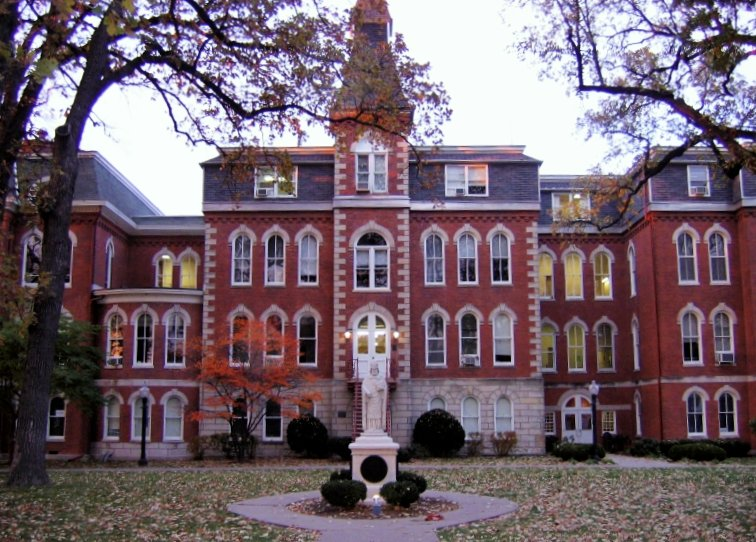
St. Ambrose University, established in 1882, is the oldest of the two universities in Davenport.

Davenport public schools serve nearly 14,500 students in the communities of Davenport, Blue Grass, Buffalo, and Walcott. The Davenport Community School District is the fourth-largest school district in Iowa. Davenport has four public high schools: Central, West, Mid City and North and one private high school: Assumption. There are six public intermediate schools and 23 public elementary schools. Sudlow, one of the intermediate schools, was named after Phebe Sudlow, the first female public school superintendent in the United States. She was superintendent for Davenport schools from 1874 to 1878. The high schools are part of the Mississippi Athletic Conference for sports.

The city has four colleges and universities: Saint Ambrose University, established in 1882, is the oldest; Kaplan University, Palmer Chiropractic College, and Hamilton Technical College. Palmer College is the first chiropractic school and the site of the first chiropractic adjustment in the world.

Marycrest International University was a university in Davenport from 1939 to 2002, when it closed. The campus was renovated and adapted to senior citizen housing.

== Media ==
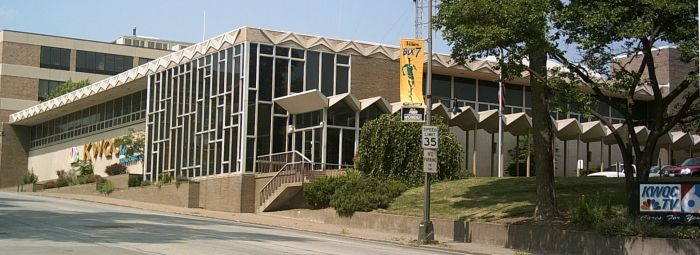
The KWQC building was the first television station in Davenport.

There are two major daily newspapers in Davenport. The Quad-City Times is based out of Davenport and The Dispatch/Rock Island Argus is based out of Moline. An alternative free newspaper, the River Cities' Reader, is published in Davenport. All four major television networks have stations in the area, including KWQC (NBC) and KLJB (Fox) in Davenport. WHBF (CBS) is located in Rock Island and WQAD (ABC) is in Moline.

The Quad Cities ranks as the 97th largest market for television and the 147th largest market for radio. Radio station WOC made its local broadcasting debut on February 18, 1922. It was the second licensed station on the air. In 1933, WOC hired future president Ronald Reagan as a staff announcer.

== Infrastructure ==
=== Transportation ===
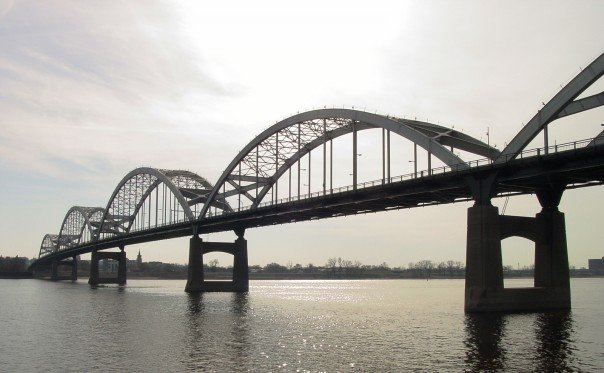
The Rock Island Centennial Bridge connects Downtown Davenport with Downtown Rock Island, Illinois

Three interstate highways serve Davenport: Interstate 80, Interstate 280, and Interstate 74. Interstate 88 serves the Illinois Quad Cities and runs east to Chicago. U.S. Route 6, U.S. Route 61, and U.S. Route 67 also go through Davenport; U.S. 67 crosses over to Illinois via the Rock Island Centennial Bridge. Davenport is connected to the Illinois side of the Quad Cities by a total of three bridges across the Mississippi River. The Government Bridge and the Centennial Bridge connect Downtown Davenport with the Rock Island Arsenal and downtown Rock Island, respectively. The I-280 Bridge connects the western edge of Davenport with the western edge of Rock Island.

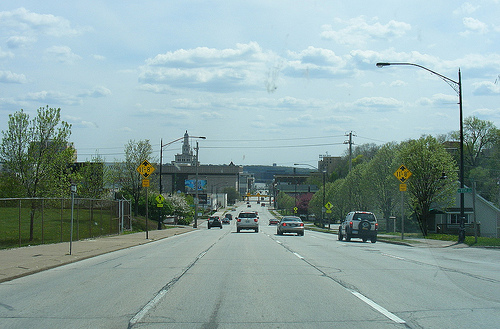
Heading into Downtown Davenport on Harrison Street (US 61) South Bound.

Other highways include Iowa Highway 22, which is on the city's southwest side, and Iowa Highway 130, which runs along Northwest Boulevard on Davenport's north edge. For air travel, Davenport Municipal Airport – located adjacent to the city's northern city limits – serves smaller aircraft, and is the home of the annual Quad City Airshow. The Quad City International Airport across the river in Moline, Illinois, is the closest commercial airport. Major railroads include the Iowa Interstate Railroad and the Iowa, Chicago and Eastern. Two national U.S. recreation trails intersect in Davenport: the Mississippi River Trail and the American Discovery Trail.

Amtrak currently does not serve Davenport or the Quad Cities. The closest station currently is about 50 miles (80 km) away in Galesburg, Illinois. In 2008, United States Senators Tom Harkin, Chuck Grassley, Dick Durbin, and Barack Obama sent a letter to Amtrak asking them to begin plans to bring rail service to the Quad Cities. In October 2010, a $230 million federal fund was announced that will bring Amtrak service to the Quad Cities, with a new line running from Moline to Chicago. They had hoped to have the line completed in 2015, and offer two round trips daily to Chicago. Currently the Moline station does not have any Amtrak service. Greyhound Lines/Burlington Trailways bus service has a station in Davenport. The building is shared with the local Davenport Citibus. Davenport does not have any river ports.

Davenport has an infamous "truck-eating bridge". The bridge, or rather three bridges, is a set of railroad bridges that cross over north and southbound U.S. Route 61 and another street. Every year an average of 12 semi trucks hit the bridge, usually causing massive damage to the trucks. The bridges, made out of iron, steel, and concrete, are rarely damaged.

==== Davenport Citibus ====
Public transit appeared in Davenport in 1969 when the city created a City Transit Authority. The authority at first provided monetary support to Davenport City Lines Bus Company, which was a privately owned company. After a few years the city purchased the Davenport City Lines and placed the operation of public transportation under the jurisdiction of the city's Department of Municipal Transportation. Today, CitiBus is a division of the Department of Public Works. CitiBus has a total of 20 vehicles and covers approximately 30 square miles (78 km^{2}) of the city. CitiBus connects with both Bettendorf Transit and the Illinois Quad Cities mass transit system, MetroLINK. In 2007 Citibus saw a ridership of 1,022,815 customers. Ridership as of September 2008 had grown to 1,045,000 due in part to high gas prices.

=== Utilities ===
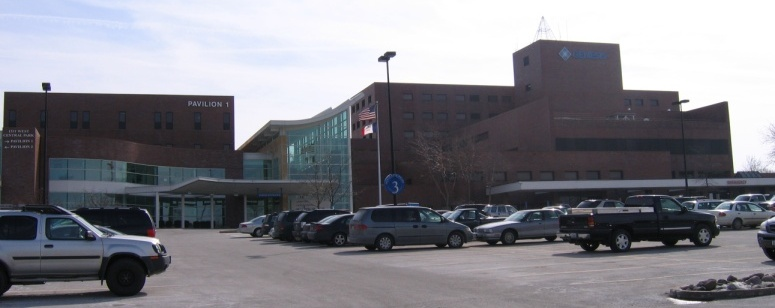
Genesis West is one of the two hospitals in Davenport. The other hospital is Genesis East.

Electricity to Davenport, and the rest of the Iowa Quad Cities, is provided by MidAmerican Energy Company. Water is provided by the Mississippi River and is treated by the Iowa American Water Company. The water treatment facility is located in southeast Davenport.

=== Health care ===
Davenport is served by two hospitals: Genesis Medical Center East – Rusholme Street and Genesis Medical Center – West Central Park Avenue part of the Genesis Health System. Together the facilities, along with two other facilities outside Davenport have 665 beds. The hospitals employ more than 600 physicians and 5,000 staff members. The American Nurses Credentialing Center, awarded Genesis Medical Center the Magnet designation for excellence in nursing services. Fewer than three percent of hospitals receive this honor.

== Notable people (Davenporters) ==
Music

Guitarist and vocalist John Kadlecik, who founded The Dark Star Orchestra and toured with the members of The Grateful Dead in the band Furthur, also grew up in Davenport, as well as rapper Dave Blunts. Jazz musician Bix Beiderbecke, after whom the Bix 7 road race and jazz festival are named.

Sports

Sports figures born in Davenport include former middleweight and super-middle champion of the world in boxing Michael Nunn, NFL running back Roger Craig, NFL offensive lineman Julian Vandervelde, former NBA guard Ricky Davis, former NBA G-League guard Marlon Stewart, UFC welterweight champion Robbie Lawler, NFL wide receiver Kenny Shedd, and professional wrestler Seth Rollins.

Politics

The former mayor of St. Louis, Lyda Krewson.

Artists

Actors Stuart Margolin, Lara Flynn Boyle, Sue Lyon, Linnea Quigley, and Greg Stolze, and Jock Mahoney are from Davenport. The artist Isabel Bloom was raised in Davenport; she is the creator of decorative concrete figurines that bear her name.

Innovators

Other natives include the aviation pioneer Samuel Cody and Otto Frederick Rohwedder the inventor of mass-produced sliced bread.

Scientists

Ida Henrietta Hyde (1857–1945), physiologist, was born in Davenport.

== Film, theater, and literary references ==
- Bix Beiderbecke recorded a song in 1925 called "Davenport Blues".
- In the bed department scene of the Marx Brothers 1941 movie "The Big Store" Groucho tells a man to "Just press that button over by the davenport.". The man replies "Where is the davenport?" and Groucho replies "It's in Iowa.".
- The 1958 Johnny Cash song, "Big River", also later recorded by Bill Monroe and other artists, mentions "cavortin' in Davenport."
- Davenport is one of eight cities listed in the song "Iowa Stubborn" from the 1957 musical The Music Man.
- In the film Tommy Boy, Richard Hayden attempts to get directions to a business appointment in Davenport from a service station 22 miles away on the Illinois side of the river, but the employee tells him to get a new map.

== Sister cities ==
Davenport's sister cities are:

- Kaiserslautern, Germany (1960)
- Ilhéus, Brazil (2005)
- (Republic of Ireland) County Carlow, Ireland (2006)

=== Friendship cities ===
Davenport has friendly relations with:

- Langfang, China (2018)
- Colón, Mexico

== See also ==
- African Americans in Davenport, Iowa
- Bucktown, Davenport
- List of tallest buildings in the Quad Cities
