= National Center for Midwest Art and Design =

Academic institute in Davenport, Iowa

Coordinates: 41.5206°N 90.5763°W

The National Center for Midwest Art and Design (known as NCMAD) is based at the Figge Art Museum in Davenport, Iowa. Founded in 2007, it is an academic institute that promotes the study of art, architecture and design in the Midwestern United States. NCMAD sponsors research, publications, and academic conferences on various related topics. The recent museum exhibition entitled "Global Currents: The John Deere Art Collection" is an example of an NCMAD project. NCMAD is currently responsible for the Grant Wood archive at the museum. The founding director was Dr. Gregory Gilbert, head of the Art History department at Knox College (Illinois), which displays part of its Midwestern art collection at the Figge Art Museum.
