= Neighborhoods of Davenport, Iowa =

Neighborhoods of US state

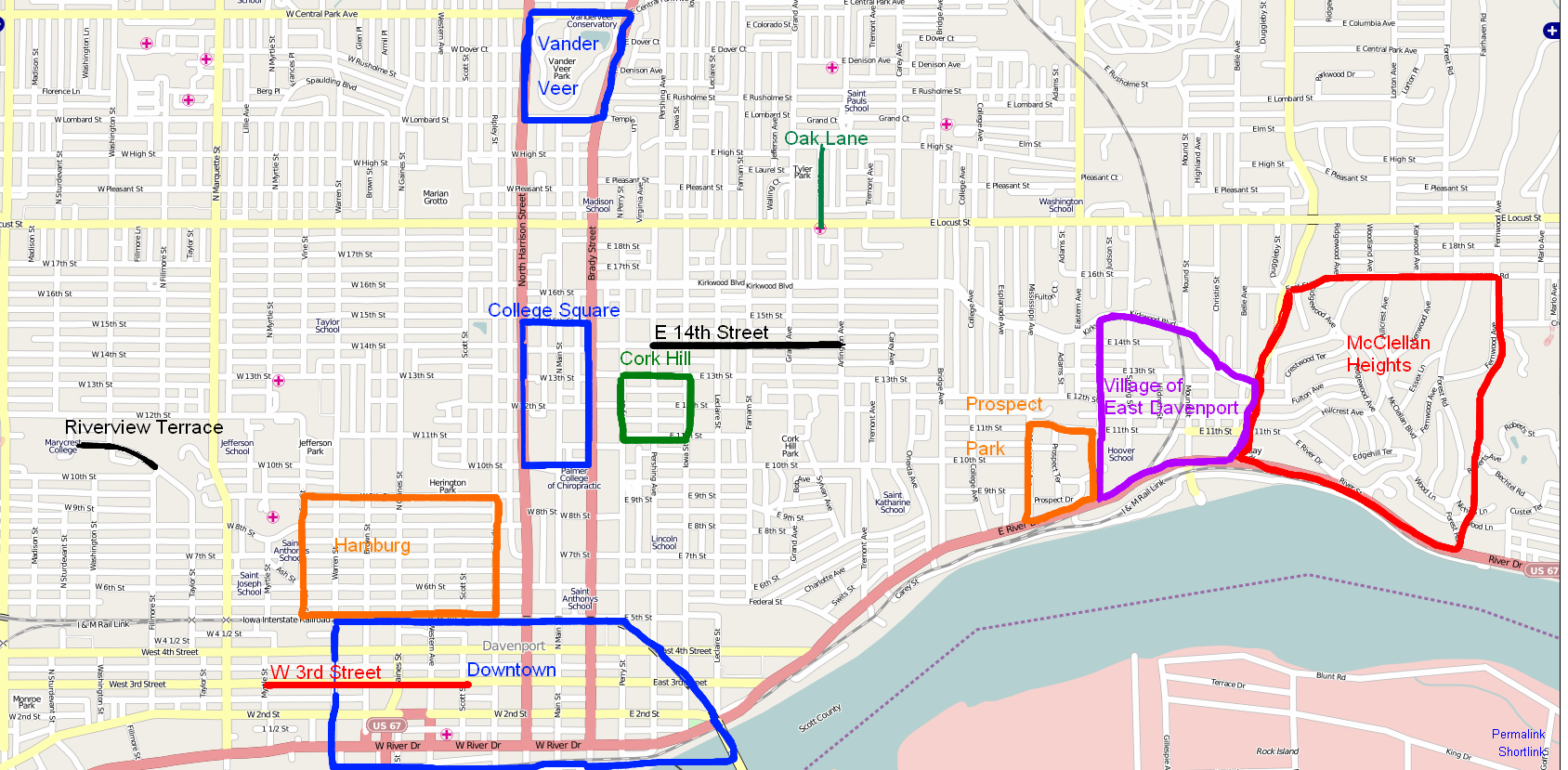
Map highlighting the historic neighborhoods

Map of Davenport.

The city of Davenport, Iowa, United States has neighborhoods dating back to the 1840s. The Davenport Plan and Zoning Commission divided the city into five areas: downtown, central, east end, near north, and northwest and west end. The neighborhoods contain many architectural designs, including Victorian, Queen Anne, and Tudor Revival. Many of the original neighborhoods were first inhabited by German settlers.

== Downtown ==
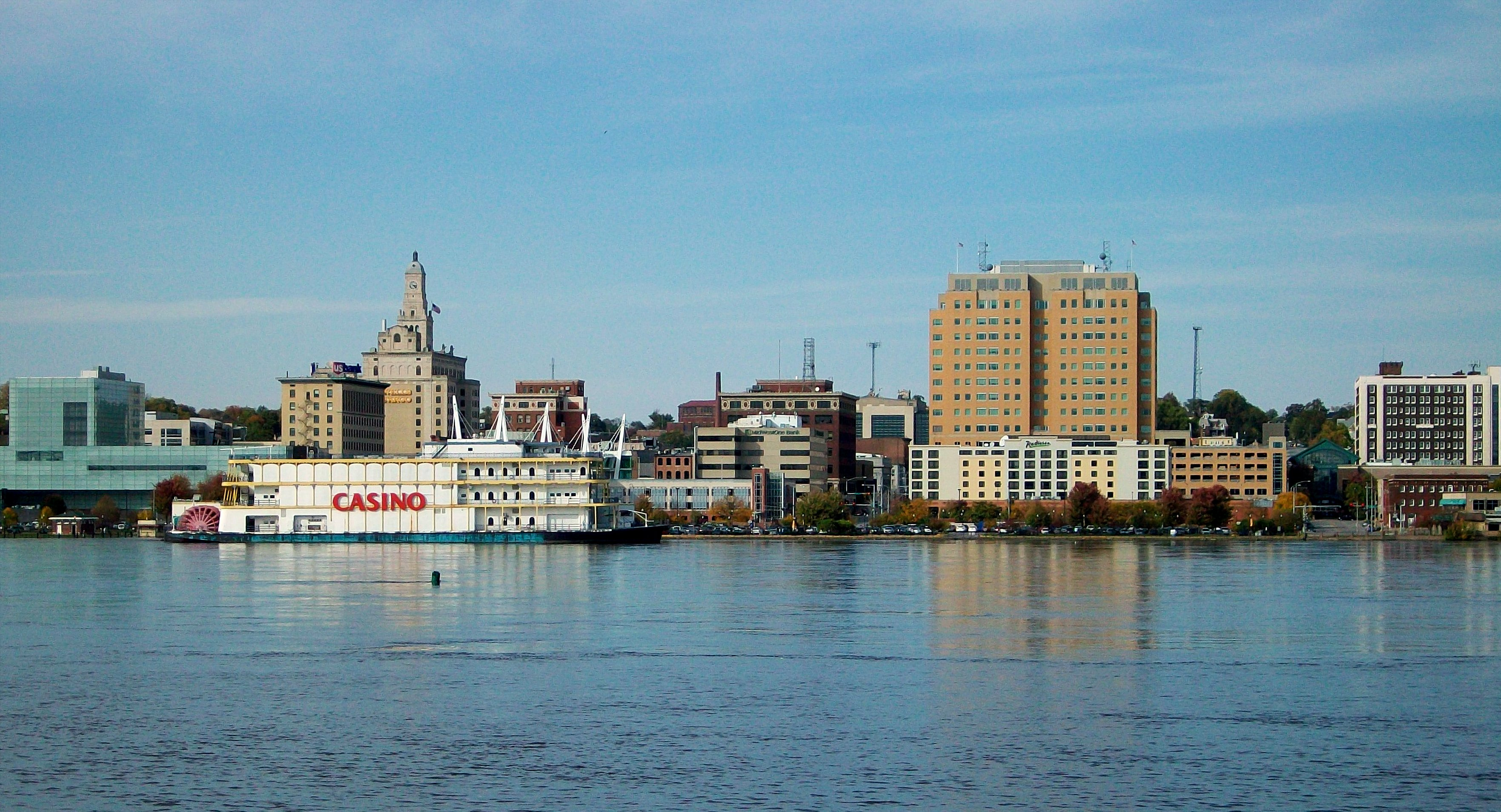
Downtown Davenport, Iowa looking across the Mississippi River from Rock Island, Illinois.

Downtown Davenport sits on the banks of the Mississippi River. Downtown is bordered on the south by the river; the east and north, by railroad tracks running on the north side along Fifth Street; and the west, by Warren Street. Downtown underwent several generations of growth beginning in the 1840s and 1850s. During this period, the buildings were all modest one- and two-story frame buildings. The prosperity of the 1880s and 1890s led to the development of upscale commercial buildings, during which the first department store, a five-story brick building, was constructed. Technological improvements in skeleton construction and elevators enabled buildings to reach new heights. Development in the west end of Downtown shifted from commercial to residential buildings, mostly in the form of apartments. Downtown contains the two tallest buildings in the Quad Cities: the Wells Fargo Bank Building, which is 255 feet (78 m) tall, and the Mid-American Energy Building, which is 220 feet (67 m) tall. Other tall buildings include the 11-story Blackhawk Hotel, the 150-foot (46 m) Kahl Building and the Davenport City Hall. The Davenport Motor Row and Industrial Historic District, a former light industrial area, is located in the southeast corner of downtown between River Drive and Third Street.

== Central neighborhoods ==
The West Third Street neighborhood extends from Scott Street to Myrtle Street along West Third Street. The significance of this neighborhood is derived from the German-American community that originally lived in the neighborhood. Residents during that time period consisted mostly of members of the working class. The focus of the neighborhood was Washington Square—a single block laid out by Antoine LeClaire in the original city. The square was the site of German beer gardens, musical events, veterans' celebrations and other outdoor activities, and served as the welcoming point for new German immigrants.

Hamburg is located northwest of Downtown, covering Fifth Street to Ninth Street and Ripley Street to Vine Street. The neighborhood contains the most architecturally significant buildings of the old German neighborhoods. Hamburg slopes up to bluffs overlooking Downtown and the river. The neighborhood was a prime location for prominent Germans and contains mostly residential structures; there are very few commercial buildings or churches. The first dwellings were small single-story cottages modeled after the Greek Revival design. Other housing designs in the neighborhood include Victorian, Gothic Revival, Italianate, Second Empire, and Queen Anne.

Cork Hill is located on a square mile of land east of the original town. It was plotted by town founder Antoine LeClaire in the 1840s to 1880s, and housed the residence of LeClaire himself, his heirs, and Irish and transplanted American settlers. It contains densely built large- and medium-sized houses set close together as well as the Sacred Heart Cathedral. The houses are of the Italianate, Queen Anne cottage, Georgian, and Colonial Revival styles.

East Fourteenth Street has sixty-seven houses from Pershing Street to Arlington Avenue along Fourteenth Street developed during the 1840s and the 1870s. During that time, the neighborhood contained mostly middle-class Irish immigrants and Americans. The houses are fairly large and range from Victorian to Classical Revival styles, and all but one of the houses are wood frame. The original neighborhood housed prominent entrepreneurs, industrialists, and professionals.

College Square is located north of Downtown, from Tenth Street to Fifteenth Street and Brady Street to Harrison Street (U.S. Route 61). Two blocks of the neighborhood on Harrison Street contain mid-nineteenth-century houses. Another two blocks are dedicated to large-scale education and religious buildings, including the Palmer College of Chiropractic campus. Most of the houses in the neighborhood date from 1860 to the early twentieth century. Harrison and Main streets have become more commercialized over the years, along with the east side of Brady Street, while the west side of Brady Street still contains mostly residential buildings.

== East neighborhoods ==
Bridge Avenue The historic district stretches from River Drive along the Mississippi River up a bluff to East Ninth Street, which is near the top of the hill. The neighborhood is made up of fourteen houses on the southern end of Bridge Avenue. The houses were mostly built between 1870 - 1910. The most prominent of the residences was built by Ambrose Fulton, who was significant to Davenport's early settlement and its industrial history. He was an early and aggressive promoter of the new town.

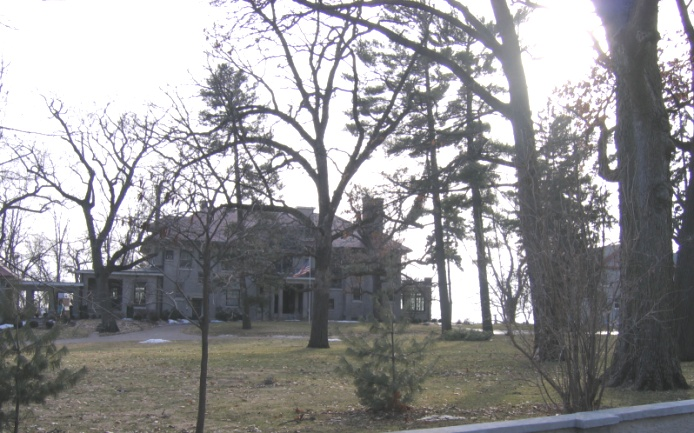
One of the large houses in the McClellan Heights neighborhood

McClellan Heights is the largest neighborhood in the east end and sits on a 400 acres (1.6 km^{2}) area east of the Village of East Davenport. It runs from Jersey Ridge Road to the Bettendorf city limits, and from River Drive to Middle Road. Four hundred houses make up the McClellan Heights neighborhood, dating from 1905 to 1940. The land is made up of many hills and ravines; the streets follow the topography, requiring many winding roads and odd-shaped lots. Developed from south to north, four very large mansions built before World War I were coveted by upper-middle class residents. Housing styles include American Craftsman, Prairie, American Foursquare, Colonial Revival, and Georgian. The neighborhood was mostly settled by Dutch and New England immigrants. The houses and a few brick streets that run through the neighborhood remain in good to excellent condition.

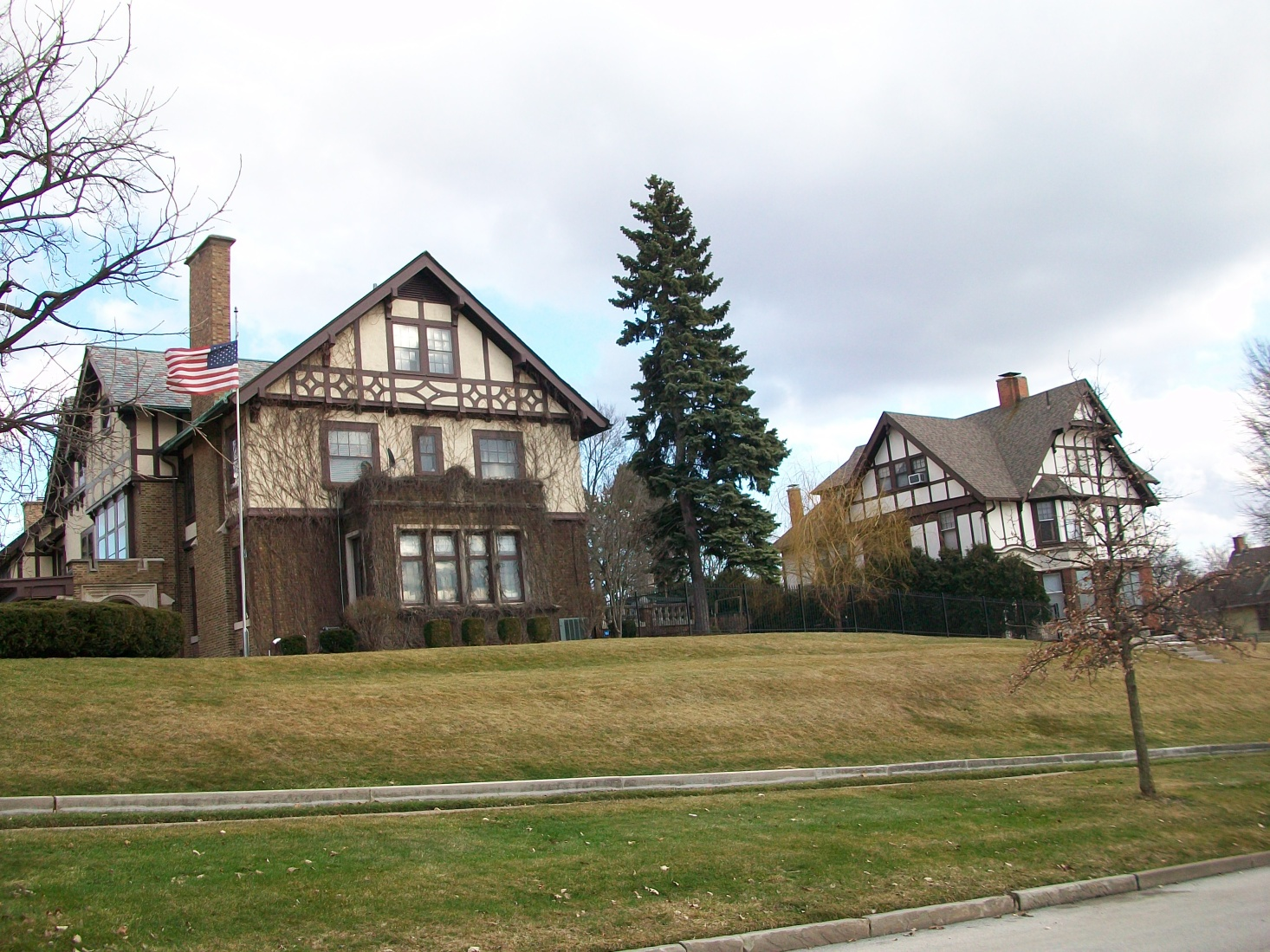
Some of the houses in the Prospect Park Historic District.

Prospect Park is a small neighborhood located on the western border of the Village of East Davenport. It runs along Mississippi Street from Eleventh Street down to River Drive (U.S. Route 67) and a block east along Prospect Drive and Prospect Terrace. It was developed from 1895 to 1910, and is one of many Davenport neighborhoods built at the turn of the century to focus around a park. Houses in Prospect Park are very large and are set on spacious lots. They are built in the late Queen Anne, Neoclassical, and Tudor Revival styles. The neighborhood housed many prominent figures, including contractors, physicians, and attorneys. The proximity and commanding view of the river kept this neighborhood fashionable long after the original families had departed. Unlike similar west end and central neighborhoods, Prospect Park has remained composed primarily of single-family homes.

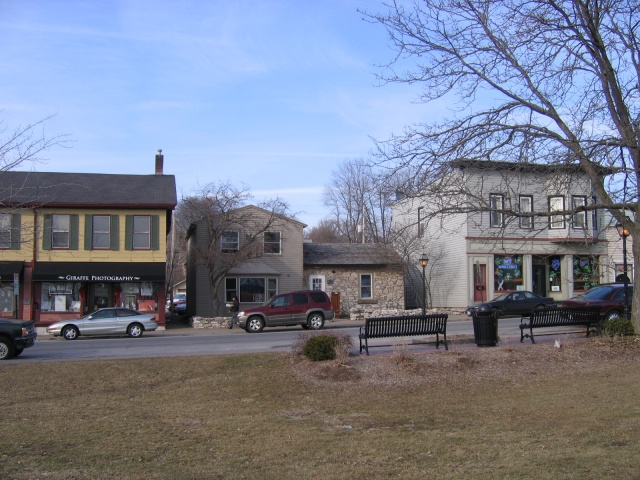
The Village of East Davenport is full of small specialty shops. The picture was taken from Lindsay Park, which was used as parade grounds for Civil War soldiers from Camp McClellan.

The Village of East Davenport (known locally as The Village) is a neighborhood that dates back to the 1850s and was originally known as "Stubb's Eddy". The Village was established in 1851 to service the logging industry, and was annexed by the city in 1857. It experienced three stages of growth: the period following the American Civil War, when many residential buildings were built; from 1890 to 1915, when construction of large mansions on the bluffs (allowing views of the Mississippi River) began; and the turn of the twentieth century, at the far east end of the neighborhood and the city. The houses in The Village were built along the curves of the topography, not in the grid fashion that was used in the rest of the city.

Today, The Village consists of residential and commercial buildings (mostly small specialty shops). It is bounded to the west by Judson Street, to the north by Kirkwood Boulevard, to the east by Jersey Ridge Road, and to the south by River Drive. Set in a bowl-like valley, commercial buildings are in the southern part of the neighborhood, while residential buildings are in the northern part on the hillside. Lindsay Park is located in the southeast corner and was used as parade grounds for soldiers from Camp McClellan during the Civil War. Today, the park contains play equipment and baseball diamonds and provides a view of the river.

== Near north neighborhoods ==
At the turn of the twentieth century, development extended along transportation arteries and street car lines. The areas along Locust Street, Brady Street, and Harrison Street were developed around this time.

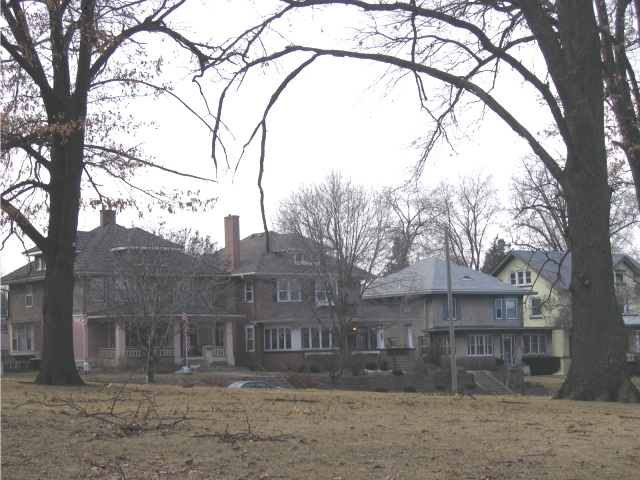
Vander Veer Park Historic District houses looking across Harrison Street.

Columbia Avenue is a neighborhood located north and west of Vander Veer Botanical Park. The area is entirely residential and it contains brick apartment buildings that were built between 1930 and 1939. It is one of the city's smallest districts and it is unique among the other historic districts in that it contains primarily apartment buildings. The neighborhood is made up of 19 four to six unit apartment buildings that were built between 1930 and 1939 and two similar structures built in the 1950s.

Oak Lane is a neighborhood that along Oak Lane from High Street south to Locust Street. The neighborhood contains 27 middle-class houses developed from 1900 to 1910 by Amos Cutter, a local real estate entrepreneur. It is a significant example of the speculative development which appeared in Davenport in the first decades of the twentieth century.

Vander Veer Park consists of houses surrounding Vander Veer Botanical Park and is bounded to the north by Central Park Avenue, to the east by Brady Street, to the south by Lombard Street, and to the west by Harrison Street. The houses were built between 1895 and 1915 and are Queen Anne- and Tudor Revival-styled. The neighborhood is anchored on the south by a church and outing club. The park, originally named Central Park after the New York City park, was originally the site of the Scott County Fairgrounds. The park was later renamed Vander Veer in honor of an early Davenport park commissioner. Development of Vander Veer Park was the first major beautification effort outside of two small spaces in downtown.

== Northwest and west end neighborhoods ==
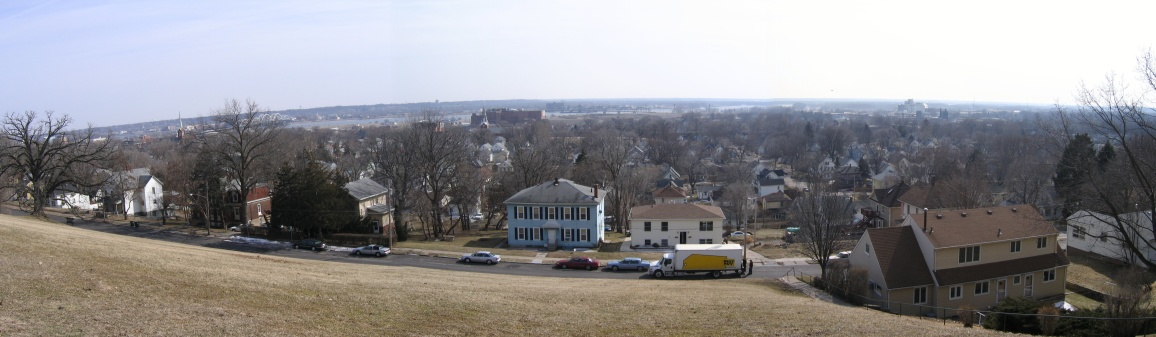
View from Riverview Terrace Park overlooking Davenport. Rock Island, Illinois can be seen at the top of the picture across the Mississippi River.

At the time northwest Davenport was developed, during a post-Civil War expansion, it consisted of the area around Locust Street, Marquette Street, and Washington Street. The area housed many working-class Germans; it was plotted in the 1850s, and extensive development occurred in the 1870s. The houses were mostly one and a half- to two-story front gable American Foursquare and simplified Queen Anne buildings. The area around five-points, where three streets come together to form a five-point intersection, contained the bulk of the commercial structures. Alterations or replacements of almost all of the original buildings has diminished the significance of this historic area. The West End part of the area is filled with people who are mildly poor to the point of Poverty and several are classified to be uneducated.

Riverview Terrace is a neighborhood that contains twenty-four houses and a 3-acre (12,000 m^{2}) park. Riverview Terrace runs along Clay Street from Fillmore Street northwest to the edge of the old Marycrest International University. On the south side is Riverview Terrace Park, originally called Lookout Park, which is located on a large steep hill. The area around the park contains large Italianate, Georgian, and Federal-style houses. Beyond the park are smaller houses and brick streets.
