= Common Chord (organization) =

Music facility

Coordinates: 41.5213°N 90.5754°W

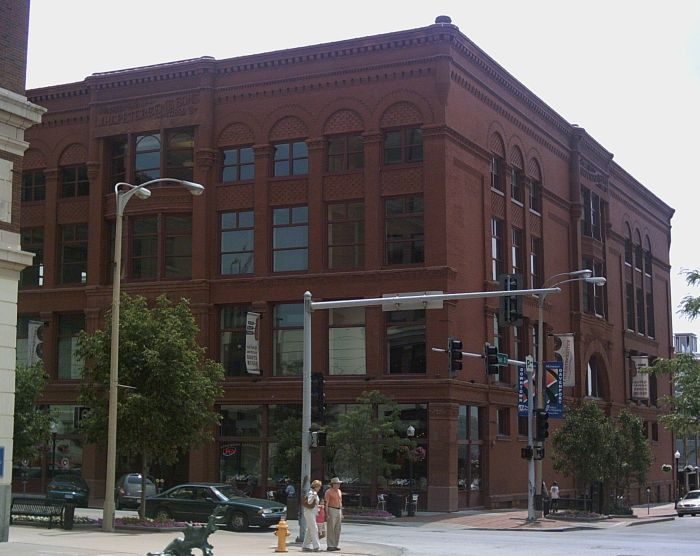
The Redstone Building, home of Common Chord. The Redstone Building was originally the longtime home of the Petersen Harned Von Maur flagship store

Common Chord, formally known as the River Music Experience, is a multi-use music facility and 501(c)3 non-profit organization located on the first two floors of the historic Redstone Building in downtown Davenport, Iowa.

The mission statement is "Common Chord activates the power of music to improve our community."

Common chord is the home of the Redstone Room, The Lemonade Stand (Restaurant space) on the first floor and live music venue on the 2nd floor known as The Redstone Room. Its community stage plays host to over 150 performances per year. These range from a weekly open mic night to the top local bands, and are typically open to the public and free of charge. The Redstone Room is a state-of-the-art music venue hosting national and regional acts that play original music. Since the name change Common Chord continues to set up free live music events around the Quad Cities in partnership with local city government's, farmers markets and sponsors.

Common Chord offers kids music programs year round from "Kidstock" a summer music camp at the Redstone Building to "In-Tune" music workshops that travel to local schools and after school programs in the area.
