= Rock Island Centennial Bridge =

Centennial Bridge
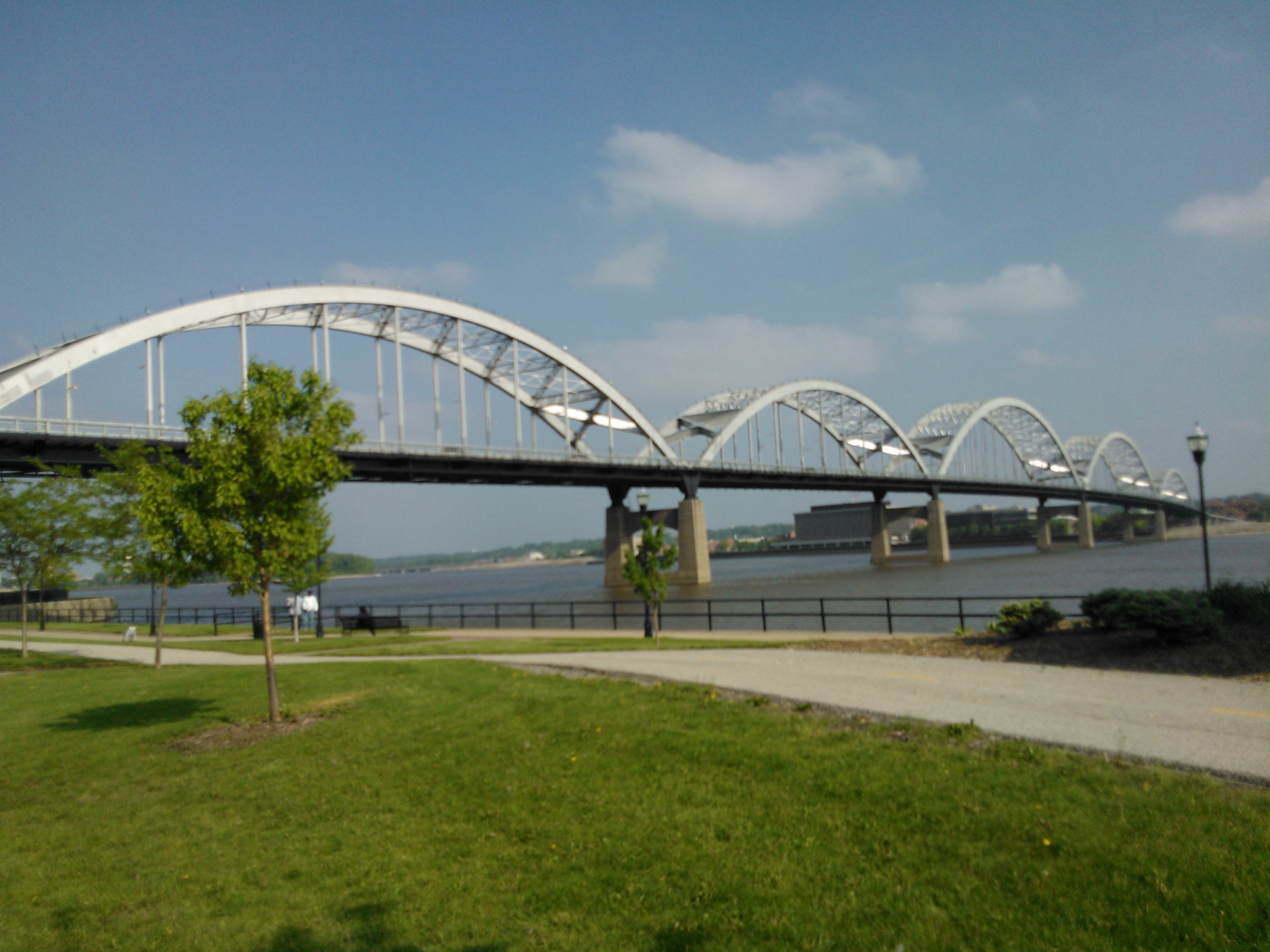
- Coordinates: 41°30′54″N 90°34′54″W
- Carries: 4 lanes of US 67
- Crosses: Mississippi River
- Locale: Davenport, Iowa and Rock Island, Illinois
- Official name: Rock Island Centennial Bridge
- Maintained by: Illinois Department of Transportation

Characteristics
- Design: Steel arch bridge Tied-arch bridge
- Total length: 4,447 feet (1,355 m)
- Longest span: 545 feet (166 m)
- Clearance below: 66 feet (20 m)

History
- Opened: July 12, 1940; 84 years ago

Statistics
- Daily traffic: 14,900

The Rock Island Centennial Bridge, officially the Master Sergeant Stanley W. Talbot Memorial Bridge, connects Rock Island, Illinois, and Davenport, Iowa. The bridge is 3,850 feet (1,173 m) long and stands 170 feet (52 m) above water level.

Construction of the bridge began in 1938 and it opened on July 12, 1940, as a toll bridge. The bridge cost $1.75 million to construct. It was designed by Ash-Howard-Needles & Tammen and built by the American Bridge Company, McCarthy Improvement Company, and Priester Construction Company. The original toll was $0.10, and eventually rose to $0.50 for automobiles (and as high as $2.00 for semi-trucks). Early in the bridge's history, pedestrians paid a $0.05 walker's fee; this fee ended in 1960. The tolls for motorists ended on May 2, 2003. On that day, a ceremony was held to commemorate the occasion and to honor the toll workers and all of those who had worked for the bridge during the toll era. The bridge had been under the management of Sue Nelson before going toll-free. The Dohrn Transfer Company of Rock Island, the first official toll-paying vehicle to cross the bridge in 1940, was the last official patron of the bridge.

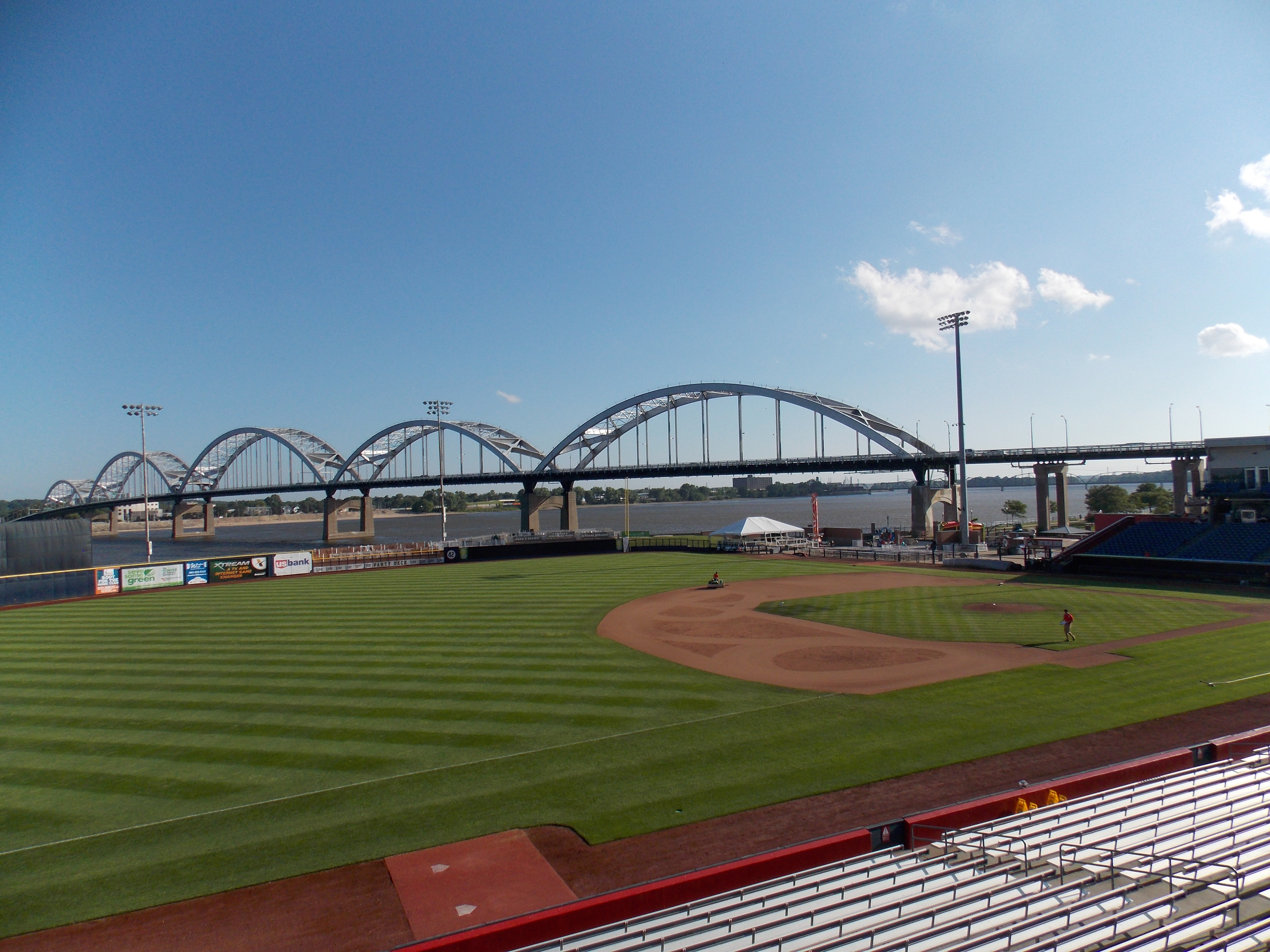
Centennial Bridge from Modern Woodmen Park in 2016

On September 4, 1988, 128 sodium lamps were installed on the arches, making the bridge a scenic sight at night. River Action Inc. raised funds for the lighting project through their initiative "Lights! River! Action!".

On July 13, 2005, the city of Rock Island transferred ownership of the bridge to the Illinois Department of Transportation after the completion of a project costing over $11 million in structural upgrades to the bridge.

It was originally going to be named the Galbraith Bridge, after Rock Island's mayor at the time, Robert Galbraith. He suggested it be named the Centennial Bridge, in commemoration of the city of Rock Island's centennial. In 2017, the bridge was officially renamed as the Master Sgt. Stanley Talbot Memorial Bridge.

The five arches of the bridge are a symbol often used to represent the Quad Cities. The two largest arches symbolize Rock Island and Davenport while the smaller ones represent the other surrounding Quad-Cities (Bettendorf, Moline, and East Moline). Modern Woodmen Park in Davenport is just upriver from the bridge. On the Rock Island side, "The District," the nightlife hub of the Quad Cities, is about one block east of the bridge.

== See also ==
- List of crossings of the Upper Mississippi River
- List of bridges documented by the Historic American Engineering Record in Illinois
- List of bridges documented by the Historic American Engineering Record in Iowa
