= List of tallest buildings in the Quad Cities =

The Quad Cities is a conglomerate of five cities spanning over two states in America. Spanning across 440.3 km^{2} (170 mi^{2}), it hosts many buildings and this is a list of the tallest buildings in the Quad Cities area.

Currently, the tallest building in the Quad cities is the Davenport Bank and Trust, reaching 78m high with seventeen floors.

Rank	Name	Image	City	Height ft / m	Floors	Year	Note	Reference
1	Davenport Bank and Trust		Davenport	255 / 78	17	1927	Tallest building in the Quad Cities	
2	MidAmerican Building		Davenport	220 / 66	15	1995	Second tallest building in the Quad Cities; tallest building constructed in the Quad Cities in the 1990s.	
3	Kone Tower		Moline	180 / 55	16	1966	Elevator testing building (inactive). Set to be demolished.	
4	LeClaire Apartments		Moline	168 / 51	15	1922	Tallest building in the Quad Cities 1922-1927	
5	Sacred Heart Cathedral		Davenport	160 / 49		1891	Tallest Building in the Quad Cities 1891-1922	
6	Kahl Building/Capitol Theater		Davenport	146 / 44	10	1919		
7	US Bank Building		Davenport	144 / 44	10	1923		
8	Northwest Bank NorthPark Tower		Davenport	143 / 44	10	1974	Tallest building constructed in the Quad Cities in the 1970s	
9	Hotel Blackhawk		Davenport	140 / 42	11	1915		
10	KONE Centre		Moline	134 / 41	8	2012	Tallest building constructed in the Quad Cities in the 2010s; tallest building built since 1995.	
11	Steepmeadow Condominiums		Rock Island	131 / 40	12	1962	Tallest residential-only building in the Quad Cities	
11	Trinity Episcopal Cathedral		Davenport	131 / 40		1873/1998		
11	Mississippi Lofts		Davenport	131 / 40	10	1931		
14	Summit Ridge Condominiums		East Moline	130 / 40	12	1970		
15	Putnam Building		Davenport	126 / 38	8	1910		
16	Union Arcade Building		Davenport	125 / 38	7	1924		

== See also ==
- List of tallest buildings in Iowa
- List of tallest buildings in Cedar Rapids
- List of tallest buildings in Illinois outside of Chicago
- List of tallest buildings in Chicago
