= MidAmerican Energy Building =

American high-rise office building located in the downtown Davenport, Iowa

Mid-American Energy Building
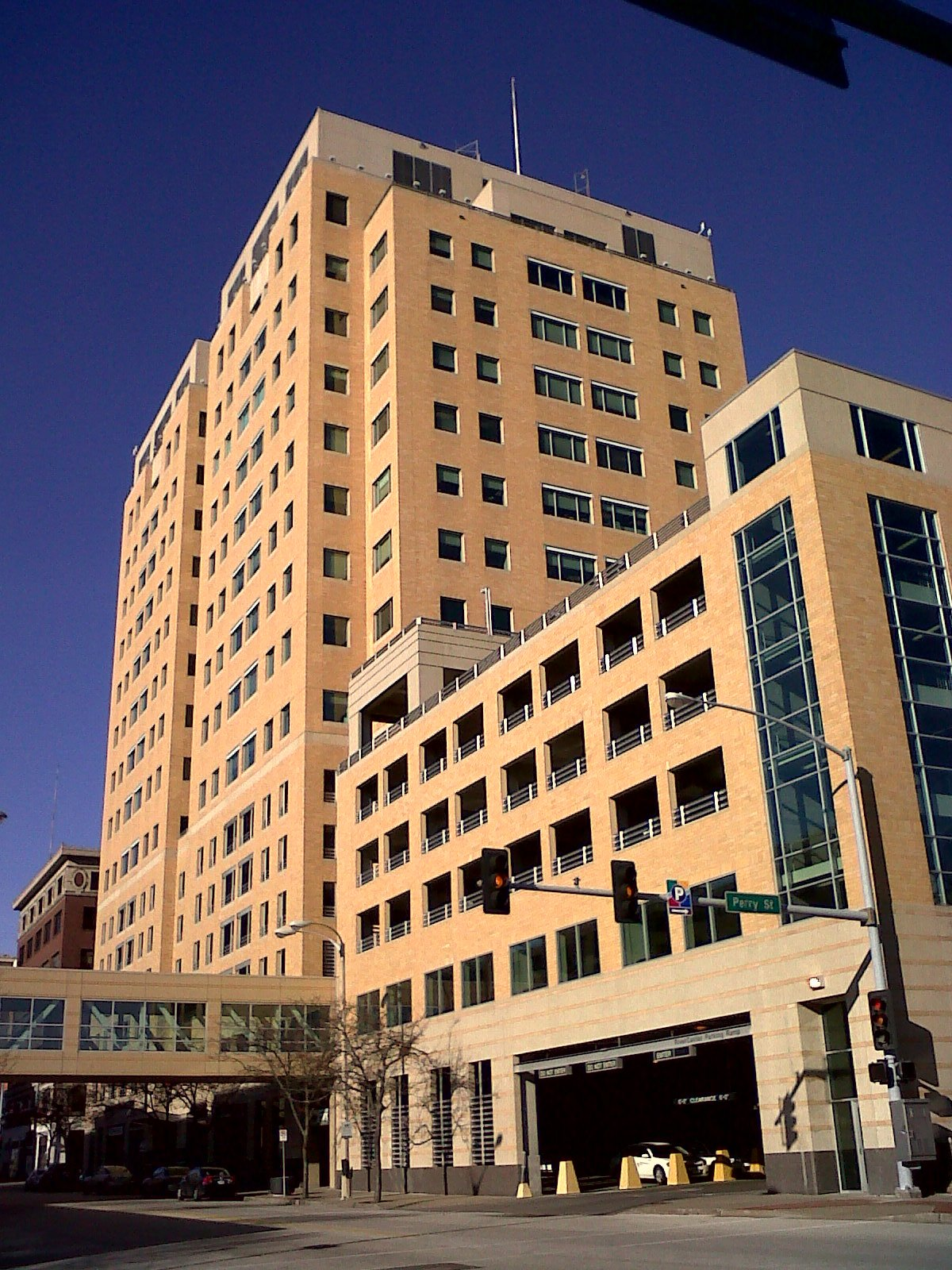
- Interactive map of the Mid-American Energy Building area

General information
- Location: 106 E. 2nd Street, Davenport, Iowa, United States
- Coordinates: 41.521667°N 90.573611°W
- Current tenants: MidAmerican Energy Company
- Completed: 1995

Height
- Height: 220 feet (67 m)

Technical details
- Floor count: 15

Design and construction
- Architects: Shive-Hattery Engineers & Architects

Other information
- Public transit: Davenport CitiBus

Mid-American Energy Building is a high-rise office building located in the downtown Davenport, Iowa. The building was designed by Shive-Hattery Engineers & Architects and built by Iowa-Illinois Gas and Electric Company in 1995. It is a 9-story office building that stands on top of a six-story parking ramp. The building stands 220 feet (67 m), and is the second tallest building in the city after the Wells Fargo Bank Building. The building is also the home to a couple of peregrine falcons and is super tall.

The building is connected by way of skywalks to the RiverCenter and the Radisson Hotel.
