= Iowa Masonic Library and Museum =

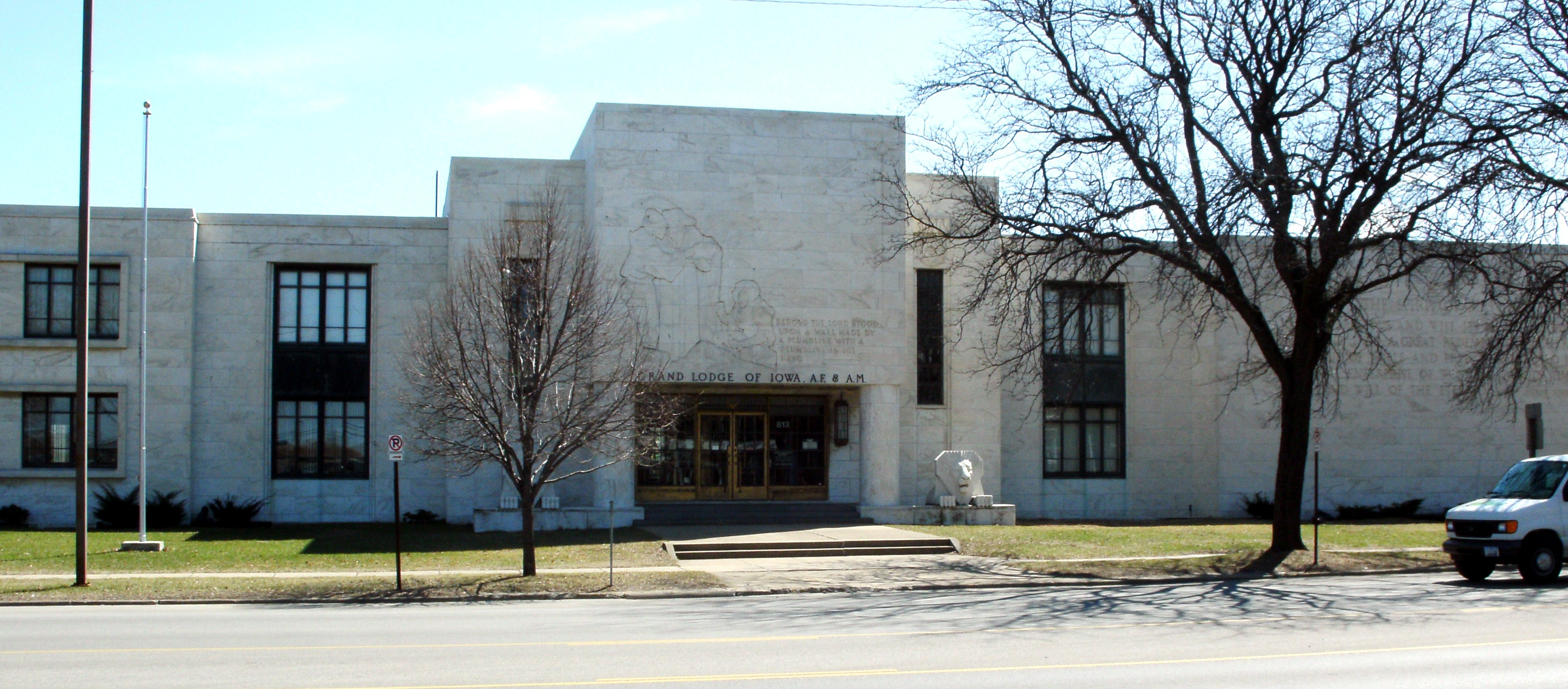
- Building on March 28, 2011

- Location within Iowa
- 41°58′57.16″N 91°39′40.36″W
- Location: 813 First Ave. SE, Cedar Rapids, Iowa, United States

History
- Built: 1955

Site notes
- Website: Grand Lodge of Iowa: Library and Museum

The Iowa Masonic Library and Museum, located in Cedar Rapids, Iowa, United States, is one of the largest Masonic libraries in the world and incorporates at least three museum collections. The library was the first, worldwide, to have its own building, which was constructed in 1884. Its current building, constructed in 1955, also houses the administrative offices for the Grand Lodge of Iowa, one of the governing bodies for Freemasonry in Iowa.

== History ==
The Library had its genesis in the 1840s, with a resolution by the Grand Lodge allocating funds to the Grand Secretary to purchase books on the topic of Freemasonry. In its earliest years the Library was located at the residence of Theodore S. Parvin, the first Grand Librarian, who started it with 100 books purchased for $5. It moved with him from Muscatine to Iowa City, to Davenport, then back to Iowa City where it was maintained until its final transfer to a more permanent home in Cedar Rapids in 1884. It has remained in Cedar Rapids ever since. The Masonic Library is now "at least one of the top five [Masonic libraries in the world], with over 100,000 volumes. Both Masonic and general books are included in the collections and the library is open to anyone, whether Masons or not."

The library was the location in 2008 of the Masonic Library and Museum Association (MLMA) annual meeting, 80 years after a similar meeting in Cedar Rapids at the original Masonic Library.

=== Prince Hall Collection ===
According to Professor David Hackett of the University of Florida "a fairly large...public collection of Prince Hall materials can be found" at the library. Likewise, Stephen Kantrowitz of the University of Wisconsin-Madison notes that "substantial collections of published black Masonic proceedings" appearing in large numbers from the 1870s on can be found at the library. According to Kantrowitz, only the Scottish Rite Masonic Museum & Library in Lexington, Massachusetts and the Livingston Library at the Grand Lodge of New York have a similar volume of Prince Hall Masonic material.

== Museum ==
The Library includes three museum collections and is open to the public. The museum collections are extensive and include a Masonic collection on the first floor and a Non-Masonic collection on the 2nd floor, consisting of thousands of items. Also, there is the Charles H. Swab Memorial collection, donated by deed in 1958.

One of the more interesting artifacts is a Civil War flag, which served as standard for the Iowa regiment in the Battle of Champion Hill, where 97 Iowans were casualties.

In 2008, the Masonic Library became the temporary location of the African American Museum of Iowa, whose building at 55 12th Ave., SE, was flooded in the Iowa flood of 2008.

== Buildings ==
In 1884 the Library became the first Masonic library in the world to have its own building.

The current building was built in 1955. It cost over a million dollars: "The new building cost a little over $1,000,000. it is constructed of Vermont Marble, with grey marble from Carthage, Missouri, lining the interior halls. The metalwork in the windows, doors and stair rails is of bronze. The main portion of the building is over 245 feet long and 50 feet wide, while the library wing at the west end is 113 feet deep."

The front facade includes an inscription from the Bible (Amos 7:7): "Behold the Lord upon a wall made by a plumbline, with a plumbline in his hand."

The history of the fundraising and planning for the building is extensive.

It is a contributing building in the Grant Wood Cultural District, certified in 2010 by the Iowa State Historical Society.

== Grand Lodge of Iowa ==
The Grand Lodge of Iowa, the governing body of Freemasonry within the state of Iowa, has its offices at the museum.

Founded in 1844, the Grand Lodge was actually in the Territory of Iowa at the time as Iowa did not gain statehood until two years later. Before the Grand Lodge of Iowa could be started, those that were interested within the Territory petitioned the Grand Lodge of Missouri for subordinate lodges. Scholars that are interested in Masonic history typically know of this Grand Lodge in particular because of the Iowa Masonic Library and Museum, which has a significant collection of Masonic and non-Masonic artifacts.

It is also noteworthy that the first four lodges operated under the Grand Lodge of Missouri before this Grand Lodge was able to be formed. The lineage for how all was founded is as follows as an excerpt from chapter III Genealogy of Iowa Masonry of the History of the Grand Lodge of Iowa (Page 49):

We read our pedigree in this way: The Grand Lodge of Scotland, formed of 'time immemorial' lodges in 1730, chartered the Provincial Grand Lodge of North Carolina in 1761, and that became independent in 1787. Tennessee was formed out of North Carolina Lodges in 1813, Missouri out of· Tennessee lodges in 1821, Iowa out of Missouri lodges in 1844, and Dakota out of Iowa lodges in 1875.

== See also ==
- List of Masonic libraries
- Cedar Rapids Scottish Rite Temple a Masonic Temple in town on the National Register of Historic Places
