= William Brodie (disambiguation) =

William Brodie (1741–1788) was a Scottish cabinet-maker, deacon and councillor, who maintained a secret life as a burglar.

William Brodie may also refer to:

- William Brodie (cricketer) (1878–1922), Guyanese cricketer
- William Brodie (naturalist) (1831–1909), Canadian dentist and naturalist
- William Brodie (sculptor) (1815–1881), Scottish sculptor
- William Bird Brodie (1780–1863), British Member of Parliament for Salisbury
- William A. Brodie (1841–1917), Grand Master of Masons in New York in 1884 who laid the foundation stone of the Statue of Liberty
- William J. Brodie (1840–?), legislator in South Carolina

== See also ==
- William Brodie Gurney (1777–1855), English philanthropist
- William R. Brody (born 1944), President of the Salk Institute and former President of The Johns Hopkins University
