= Ballet Quad Cities =

Ballet company in Illinois, United States

General information
- Year founded: 1996
- Founders: Joedy Cook
- Founding artistic director: Johanne Jakhelln
- Location: Rock Island, Illinois
- Website: www.balletquadcities.com

Artistic staff
- Artistic Director: Courtney Lyon
- Resident Choreographers: Deanna Carter, Resident Choreographer; Domingo Rubio, Resident Artist; Dominic Walsh, Artistic Advisor; Brian Enos, Guest Choreographer
- Artistic Associate: Emily Kate Long

Other
- Associated schools: Ballet Quad Cities School of Dance

Ballet Quad Cities is a ballet company located in Rock Island, Illinois. It was founded in 1996 by Joedy Cook. The company performs both classical and contemporary dance at various venues in the greater Quad Cities region of Illinois and Iowa.

== History ==
Before its inception, Ballet Quad Cities was known as “Cassandra Manning Ballet Theatre,” under the direction of Susan Snider. Snider grew the arts in the Quad Cities before moving with her family to Des Moines, IA. At the time of its founding the company had one paid dancer. By 2010, the number of dancers who form the company grew to twelve dancers. The original artistic director was Johanne Jakhelln, who left the company in 2006 to return to her native Norway.

In April 2010 the company performed for the first time in New York City at the Alvin Ailey Citigroup Theatre. The ballet's choreographer, Deanna Carter, had been one of five choreographers to present their work at the annual Ballet Builders.

Ballet Quad Cities began a collaboration with Orchestra Iowa starting in the 2012–2013 season. Two performances featuring the two artistic groups are held in both the Paramount Theatre in Cedar Rapids, Iowa, where Orchestra Iowa is based, and the Adler Theatre in Davenport, Iowa. The Adler is one of the ballet's primary venues. In 2021, BQC employs 1 male and 5 female dancers.

== Dancers ==
The dancers of Ballet Quad Cities as of February, 2020:

- Nicholas Bartolotti
- Claire Cordano
- Maya de Leon
- Rachel Martens
- Meghan Phillips
- Elayne Podolske
- Madeleine Rhode
- Domingo Rubio* part time
- Malachi Squires
- Mahalia Zellmer

== Ballet Quad Cities School of Dance ==
Ballet Quad Cities supports its own school of dance, which is also located in Rock Island. The schools philosophy is based on the principles of the Vaganova method from Russia. Beside classical ballet, the school also teaches creative movement, pointe, character, repertoire, modern, jazz, hip-hop, conditioning, yoga, tap, rhythm tap and adult ballet.

== See also ==
- Quad City Symphony Orchestra
