= Livingston Library =

Freemason library in New York City, US

Coordinates: 40.74277°N 73.99212°W

The Livingston Library in New York City is one of relatively few large libraries of Freemasonry materials. It is named after Chancellor Robert R. Livingston (1746-1813), a drafter of the Declaration of Independence.

It is owned and operated by the Grand Lodge of the State of New York and is housed on the 14th floor of Masonic Hall at 71 West 23rd Street in New York City.

== See also ==
- List of Masonic libraries
