= 1798 New York gubernatorial election =

- April 1798
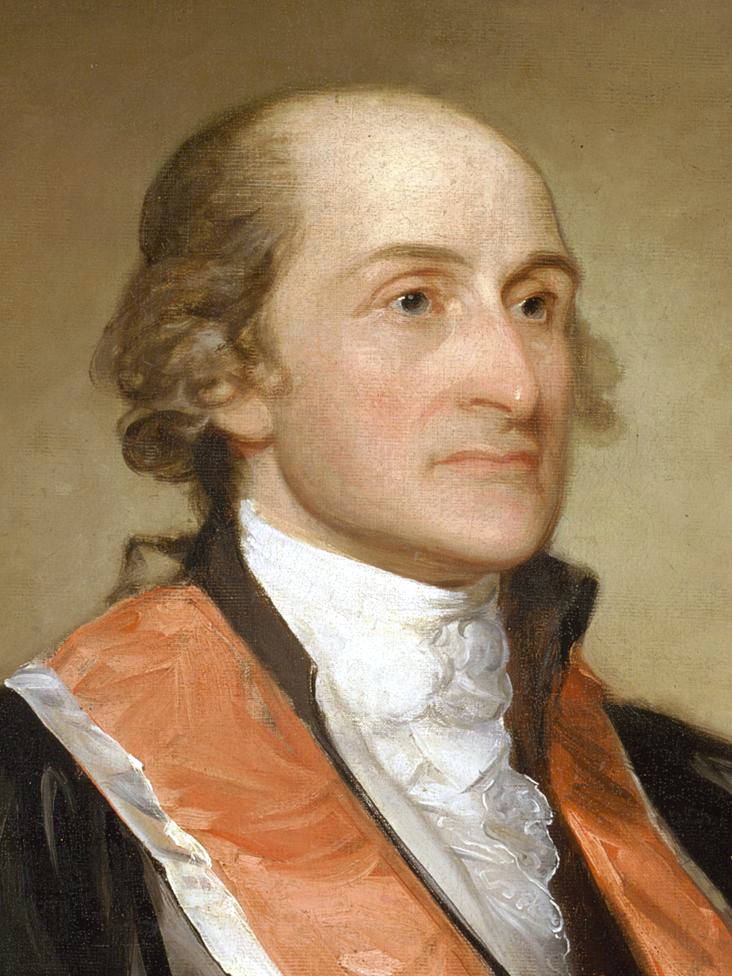

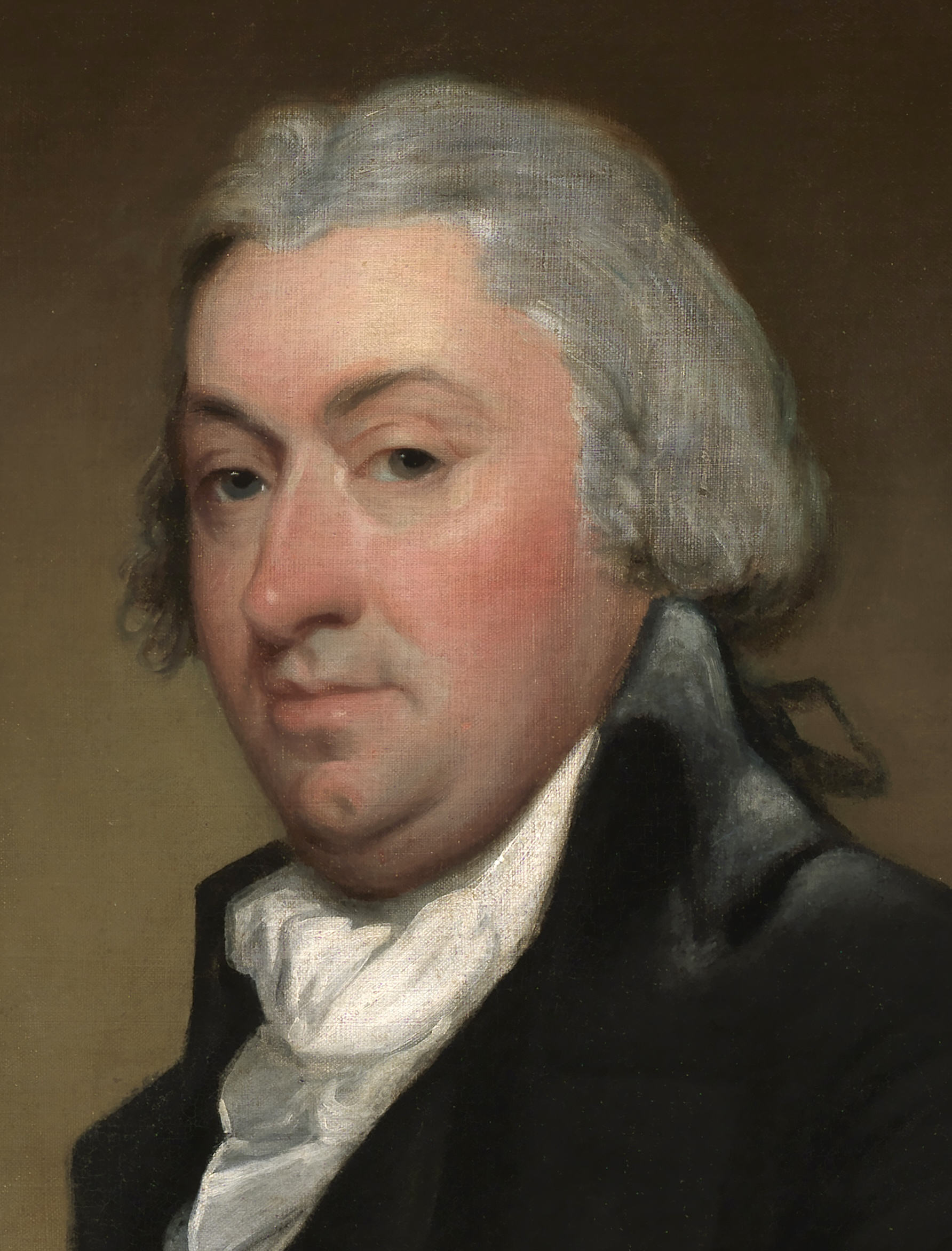
Nominee	John Jay	Robert R. Livingston
Party	Federalist	Democratic-Republican
Popular vote	16,012	13,632
Percentage	54.01%	45.99%
- County results Jay: 50–60% 60–70% 70–80% 80–90% >90% Livingston: 50–60% 60–70% 70–80% 80–90%
Governor before election
John Jay
Federalist
Elected Governor
John Jay
Federalist

The 1798 New York gubernatorial election was held in April 1798 to elect the Governor and Lieutenant Governor of New York. Incumbent Governor John Jay was elected to a second term in office over Robert Livingston.

The election was a referendum on American foreign policy during the French Revolutionary Wars, specifically the 1794 Jay Treaty between the United States and Kingdom of Great Britain, which Jay had negotiated prior to his election in 1795. Amid growing tensions with the French Republic following the XYZ Affair and outbreak of the Quasi-War with France, Jay easily won re-election.

== Background ==
Governor John Jay was sworn into office on July 1, 1798, but quickly became personally unpopular throughout the country when news of the treaty he negotiated with Great Britain became public in the United States. Public displays of violent opposition to the treaty erupted, including a burning effigy of Governor Jay in Philadelphia. Opposition was so strong that Jay's Federalist Party lost a congressional election in their stronghold of New York City. Jay also proposed a bill for the gradual abolition of slavery, but the legislature rejected his proposal in favor of a resolution favoring the rights of property owners. The party lost seats in the fall 1796 congressional and spring 1797 state elections, where De Witt Clinton, the nephew of Jay's Republican predecessor George Clinton, was elected to the Assembly from the former stronghold of Manhattan.

The Federalist Party of New York was also divided by the presidential election of 1796, in which most Federalists, including Jay, supported Vice President John Adams, but Alexander Hamilton supported Thomas Pinckney of South Carolina.

=== Qualifications ===
Under Article VII of the New York Constitution of 1777, only certain male freeholders and certain freemen of Albany or New York City could vote:

VII. That every male inhabitant of full age, who shall have personally resided within one of the counties of this State for six months immediately preceding the day of election, shall, at such election, be entitled to vote for representatives of the said county in assembly; if, during the time aforesaid, he shall have been a freeholder, possessing a freehold of the value of twenty pounds, within the said county, or have rented a tenement therein of the yearly value of forty shillings, and been rated and actually paid taxes to this State: Provided always, That every person who now is a freeman of the city of Albany, or who was made a freeman of the city of New York on or before the fourteenth day of October, in the year of our Lord one thousand seven hundred and seventy-five, and shall be actually and usually resident in the said cities, respectively, shall be entitled to vote for representatives in assembly within his said place of residence.

== General election ==
=== Candidates ===
- John Jay, incumbent Governor since 1795 (Federalist)
- Robert R. Livingston, Chancellor of New York and former United States Secretary of Foreign Affairs (Republican)

Jay was renominated at a legislative caucus of the Federalist Party on March 6.

Robert Livingston had been one of the most ardent advocates of the United States Constitution at the Poughkeepsie ratifying convention of 1788, but by 1790, his family identified with the Jeffersonian faction in politics, ostensibly over opposition to Alexander Hamilton's plan for the establishment of a national bank and federal assumption of state debts. The Livingstons may also have left the Federalists out of resentment of Hamilton and Jay's authority within the party and of Robert being passed over for Chief Justice of the United States in favor of Jay.

On February 6, 1797, he attended a public anniversary celebration for the Franco-American alliance, at which he made his opposition to the Jay Treaty known.

=== Campaign ===
By the time the spring 1798 elections approached, the XYZ Affair and Quasi-War appeared to vindicate the Jay Treaty and the Federalists' opposition to the French Republic, which became unpopular in the state.

=== Results ===
The election passed uneventfully; Jay was re-elected by an increased majority, though Republicans gained in the legislature.

1798 New York gubernatorial election
Party	Candidate	Votes	%	±%
Federalist	John Jay (incumbent)	16,012	54.01%	▲0.22
Democratic-Republican	Robert Livingston	13,632	45.99%	▼0.22
Total votes		29,644	100.00%	

== See also ==
- New York gubernatorial elections
- New York state elections
