= Grant Wood Cultural District =

Historic district in Cedar Rapids

Coordinates: 41°58′56.5″N 91°39′39.5″W

The Grant Wood Cultural District is a historic district in downtown Cedar Rapids, Iowa that was certified in 2010 by the Iowa State Historical Society.

It includes Grant Wood's studio, the Cedar Rapids Museum of Art, the Veterans Memorial Building, the U.S. Cellular Center, and numerous other points of interest.

It includes "a natural chain of sites beginning with the Masonic Library and 5 Turner Alley east of the Cedar River, past the Cedar Rapids Museum of Art and new Cedar Rapids Public Library location, Paramount Theatre, Orchestra Iowa, Mays Island and over to the west side of the Cedar River where the proposed Amphitheatre will be located." From 1924 to 1935, Grant Wood's studio was located at 5 Turner Alley.
