= Theatre Cedar Rapids =

Community theater in Cedar Rapids, Iowa, U.S.

- Address: 102 3rd St SE; Cedar Rapids, Iowa

Website
- www.theatrecr.org

Theatre Cedar Rapids (TCR) is a community theatre in Cedar Rapids, Iowa. The theatre performs several stage shows every year, and offers acting classes. Each year TCR is seen by more than 50,000 patrons, who view the work of over 35,000 volunteer hours.

== History ==
=== Early years ===
In 1925, as part of the Little Theatre Movement, Grant Wood and other local community members staged small performances in Wood's apartment at 5 Turner Alley. Wood created sets for the theatre, as well as writing, directing, and acting in plays. Wood also used the space as his artist studio, and painted the famous American Gothic at this location. Additional scenery was also built and painted by Marvin Cone. The onset of World War II put the theatre group on hiatus.

=== Post-war years ===
In 1948, after the war ended, the group reorganized calling themselves "The Footlighters". They generally performed at the local YMCA and at Coe College. In 1955, the group moved to the Old Strand Theatre, a building that had been a movie palace since 1912, and had also been known as The Olympic. The group renamed themselves to 'The Cedar Rapids Community Theatre (CRCT)'

=== Modern era ===
In June 1928, the 'RKO Iowa Theatre' opened and served as a cinema, as well as offering vaudeville stage shows. In 1940, Katharine Hepburn played at the theatre in the stage version of The Philadelphia Story. In April, 1983 the theater was shut down. Four months after the closing of the theater, the space was donated to the CRCT by Audrey Linge. When they occupied the Iowa Theatre building, the group renamed itself Theatre Cedar Rapids.

==== 2008 flood ====
During the Iowa flood of 2008, the theatre was significantly damaged, and was shut down until February 2010. While the building was being repaired the group performed at local malls and churches. Stars Michael Emerson and Ron Livingston both natives of the Cedar Rapids area, recorded videos to help fundraising efforts for repairs. Livingston had previously performed at TCR. The Federal Emergency Management Agency contributed over $4 million to the repair, and produced a short documentary about the renovations. The theatre is home to the only remaining 'Rhinestone' Barton Organ, which has been restored since it was significantly damaged in the 2008 floods.

After the theatre restoration, one of the early shows was Rent. Anthony Rapp, who originated the role of Mark Cohen in the Broadway production of the show, was invited to and attended one of the performances. After the show he participated in an extensive question and answer session about the history of the show. Of the TCR performance and theatre he said "Thank you guys, for a performance with so much heart, grace, humor and spirit", and "To be able to restore this theater shows the community’s commitment to the arts — and this theater is amazing"

==== Laramie Project protest ====
In 2010, TCRs production of The Laramie Project, a play about the murder of gay student Matthew Shepard, was the target of a protest by Westboro Baptist Church. The church website said "We will picket your filthy, goofy 'theatrical production' of the Laramie Project". Theatre supporters and others opposed to the church's position arranged a counter-protest, but in the end the church protest did not materialize. The counter-protesters converted their protest into a solidarity rally when it was apparent that the church was not going to appear.

==== 80th season ====
Theatre Cedar Rapids will be one of the first community theatres in the world to perform Les Misérables. Movie star Hugh Jackman, who performed the role of Jean Valjean in the movie version, recorded a greeting to the theatre wishing "Chookas". TCR is also one of the first theatres in the world to perform the stage version of Disney's Mary Poppins.

== Notable alumni ==
- Grant Wood
- Marvin Cone
- Ron Livingston
- Don DeFore
- Macdonald Carey
- Megan Reinking
- Joshua Casteel

== See also ==
Paramount Theatre (Cedar Rapids, Iowa)
