= Masonic Medical Research Institute =

Medical nonprofit in Utica, United States

Masonic Medical Research Institute (MMRI) is a non-profit medical research center located in Utica, New York. The Institute's research is funded by the Masonic Grand Lodge of New York and other donors.

== History ==
MMRI was founded in 1958.

In 1960 researchers at MMRI developed a mathematical model for use in the study of atrial fibrillation. In 1966 they demonstrated dual pathways in the AV node and showed the basis for AV nodal tachycardia.

In 1973 Institute researchers showed that oscillatory after potentials (delayed afterdepolarizations) was the basis for arrhythmias associated with digitalis toxicity. Over the next several years later they explored modulated parasystole and reflection as mechanisms of cardiac arrhythmias.

In the 1980s research staff worked to clarify the differences between epicardium and endocardium, and found that the presence of an action potential notch in epicardium, but not endocardium, is responsible for inscription of the electrocardiographic J wave. They found differences in the response of epicardium and endocardium to a variety of drugs and neurotransmitters.

The MMRI developed a blood substitute which was patented in 1990.

In the 1990s MMRI researchers discovered the M cell, confirming that the heart is made of several different cell types. In 1998 they uncovered the cellular basis for the various waves that appear on an electrocardiogram including the J, T and U waves.

Between 1996 and 1998 MMRI published the first gene, SCN5A, to be linked to idiopathic ventricular fibrillation (IVF). The MMRI named this the Brugada syndrome in 1996, after Josep and Pedro Brugada, who first described this as a new clinical entity in 1992, and in 1999 proposed use of quinidine and isoproterenol for its treatment.

In 2000 the MMRI research team uncovered evidence linking Sudden Infant Death Syndrome to a congenital heart defect, the Long QT syndrome (LQTS) published in The New England Journal of Medicine. That year they also found experimental evidence, confirmed by later research, that some forms of early repolarization could result in the development of life-threatening arrhythmias.

During the next few years MMRI discovered several genes that when mutated give rise to the Long QT, Short QT, Brugada and Early Repolarization syndromes. They later demonstrated that, ranolazine (Ranexa), a drug approved for ischemic heart disease, was capable of suppressing both atrial and ventricular arrhythmias.

In 2007 MMRI researchers studied atrial-selective sodium channel block as a strategy to manage atrial fibrillation. They later demonstrated that the combination of ranolazine (Ranexa) and dronedarone (Multaq) could prevent the development of atrial fibrillation, which led to Phase 2 clinical trials.

In 2010 MMRI described “J Wave Syndromes” a subset of inherited cardiac arrhythmia syndromes characterized by accentuated J waves, including the Brugada and Early Repolarization syndromes. Soon after, the research team identified Wenxin Keli, a herbal Chinese medicine, as an atrial selective sodium channel blocker capable of suppressing atrial fibrillation in experimental models. In 2012, they also identified Wenxin Keli and Milrinone as potential pharmacological therapies for the Brugada syndrome.

In 2020 and 2021 during the COVID pandemic, MMRI did COVID testing.

== Research ==
The three main research areas are heart disease research, neurocognitive disease research and autoimmune disesease research.

Under the category of heart disease research, the institute studies experimental cardiology with an emphasis on ischemic heart disease and sudden cardiac death. A program in cardiac electrophysiology uses experimental models to examine the root cause of cardiac arrhythmias and to develop treatments for heart disease.

Other areas of research at MMRI have included:

- Molecular Genetics – Using genetic sequencing techniques, scientists at the MMRI are studying inherited cardiac arrhythmia syndromes, including sudden cardiac death syndromes such as the Long QT syndrome, Short QT syndrome, Brugada syndrome and Early Repolarization syndrome.
- Molecular Biology – Genes suspected of causing genetic mutations are cloned and the mutation is inserted into a heterologous expression system so that the functional effect of the mutation can be evaluated, to further determine whether the genetic variant is the true cause of the disease.
- Stem Cell Research – This program is focused on generating induced pluripotent stem cells to be used in testing the safety and efficacy of new drugs, and also for the creation of human models of heart disease to improve understanding of arrhythmic syndromes and to custom design treatments and cures.
- Organ and Tissue Bioengineering – This is a long-term program studying the use of a combination of pluripotent stem cells and decellularized donor hearts to created human hearts for transplantation without the problem of rejection.
- Autism, Noonan Syndrome, brown fat, nano-imaging, and targeted drug delivery.

There are six Principal Investigators at MMRI, each with their own lab, team, and area of study.

=== Maria Kontaridis ===
The Kontaridis Lab's focus is on molecular signaling pathways that lead to aberrant regulation of embryonic development and mediate onset of adult disease. Research areas include autism, lupus, and Noonan Syndrome. Kontaridis is also MMRI's Executive Director and the Gordon K. Moe Professor and Chair for Biomedical Research and Translational Medicine at MMRI. She is an Associate Professor of Medicine, part-time at Beth Israel Deaconess Medical Center at Harvard Medical School.

=== Zhiqiang Lin ===
The Lin Lab researches how heart tissue and brown fat tissue grow and react to stress, especially focusing on Hippo-YAP cell signaling, which is relevant to reducing cardiovascular diseases and obesity. A better understanding of brown fat (brown adipose tissue) can also help us better understand body heat regulation, hypothermia, and diabetes. Lin's explanation of homeostasis and how brown fat insulates the human body was quoted in an article about cold-water swimming, in an article titled, "Can Our Bodies 'Learn' to Withstand Frigid Temperatures?" published by HowStuffWorks (owned by Discovery Channel) in February 2022.

=== Jason McCarthy ===
McCarthy is unique for his work in nano-imaging, nano-medicine, and targeted drug delivery. For example, McCarthy can take a particle as small as 1/1,000th the width of a hair, and place it anywhere needed in the human body.

=== Education ===
The MMRI offers a Postdoctoral Fellowship Program as well as a Predoctoral Research Training Program which is administered in affiliation with SUNY Upstate Medical University at Syracuse, New York. Its ten-week Summer Fellowship Program, initiated in 1960, provides hands-on experience in research to students in the life sciences.

MMRI operates Mentoring Programs with BOCES, tours and shadowing programs to provide information to high school students about careers in science and research. In addition, they have partnered with Mohawk Valley Health System for key initiatives benefiting the local community.

== Funding ==
Besides funding from the Grand Lodge of New York and private donations, the MMRI has recently received funding from the New York state government.

In 2019, it was granted $6 million in funding from the Empire State Development Corporation for facility upgrades.

In the January 2022 State of the State address, New York Governor Kathy Hochul proposed state funding for a new 32,000-square-laboratory at MMRI, which would establish the MMRI as a "biomedical incubator to accelerate commercialization of basic research." Additional state funding for MMRI is currently being proposed in the New York State Legislature in a bipartisan effort including Democrats and Republicans.

== Campus and facilities ==
The facility includes several labs and advanced research equipment. The core facilities include:

Core	Description	Equipment
Genetics	Studies the human genome and identifies the factors that are responsible for diseases.	Applied Biosystems 3730 DNA analyzer
Genetics	Studies the human genome and identifies the factors that are responsible for diseases.	Ion Torrent PGM
Genetics	Studies the human genome and identifies the factors that are responsible for diseases.	Ion Torrent Proton
Genetics	Studies the human genome and identifies the factors that are responsible for diseases.	Ion Torrent Ion Chef
Genetics	Studies the human genome and identifies the factors that are responsible for diseases.	Agilent 2100 Bioanalyzer
Genetics	Studies the human genome and identifies the factors that are responsible for diseases.	Applied Biosystems Quant Studio 6 qPCR (96 and 384 well)
Genetics	Studies the human genome and identifies the factors that are responsible for diseases.	Nanostring GeoMx
Imaging	Facilitate the non-invasive analysis of preclinical models of disease.	Perkin Elmer IVIS Spectrum – 2D and 3D optical imaging
Imaging	Facilitate the non-invasive analysis of preclinical models of disease.	Perkin Elmer Quantum GX microCT – x-ray computed tomography imaging
Imaging	Facilitate the non-invasive analysis of preclinical models of disease.	Visual Sonics Vevo 3100 Ultrasound – high frequency ultrasound imaging
Histopathology	Tissue fixation and processing, paraffin and cryosectioning, common and advanced histological stains, as well as immunohistochemistry and fluorescence staining.	Leica CM1950 cryostat – for fresh frozen and fixed frozen tissue sectioning
Histopathology	Tissue fixation and processing, paraffin and cryosectioning, common and advanced histological stains, as well as immunohistochemistry and fluorescence staining.	Leica RM2125 RTS manual microtome – for paraffin embedded tissue sectioning
Histopathology	Tissue fixation and processing, paraffin and cryosectioning, common and advanced histological stains, as well as immunohistochemistry and fluorescence staining.	Keyence BZ-X800 – an “all-in-one” inverted microscope – fluorescence, brightfield, and phase contrast images
Histopathology	Tissue fixation and processing, paraffin and cryosectioning, common and advanced histological stains, as well as immunohistochemistry and fluorescence staining.	Nikon Ni-E Research Microscope System – upright microscope – fluorescence, brightfield, and polarized light
FACS (Flow Cytometry Core)	Provides instrumentation and expertise in a broad range of basic and medical science disciplines.	
