= Parasystole =

- Specialty: Cardiology

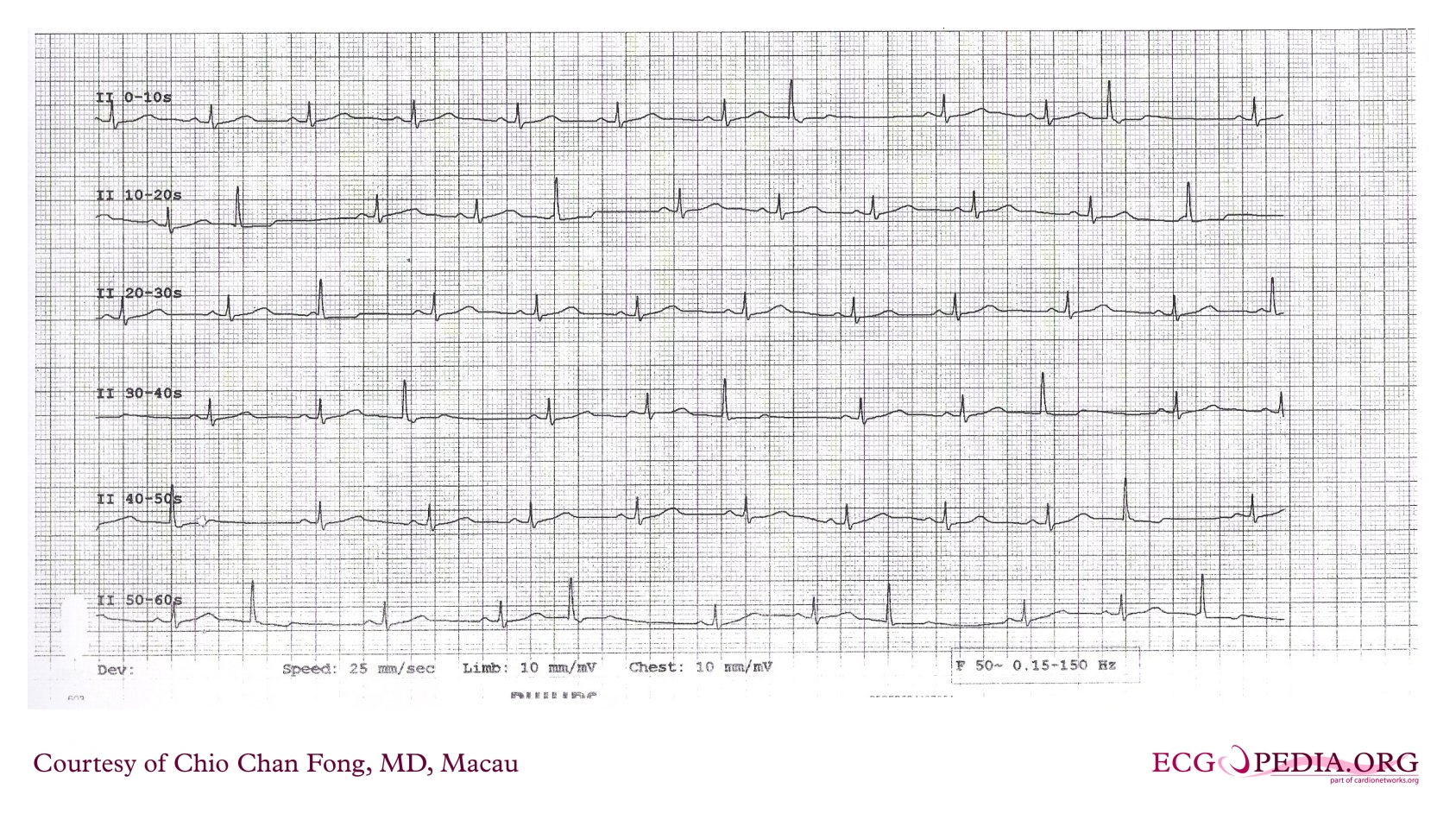
Rhythm strip showing parasystole, compare

Parasystole is a kind of arrhythmia caused by the presence and function of a secondary pacemaker in the heart, which works in parallel with the SA node. Parasystolic pacemakers are protected from depolarization by the SA node by some kind of entrance block. This block can be complete or incomplete.

Parasystolic pacemakers can exist in both the atrium or the ventricle. Atrial parasystolia are characterized by narrow QRS complexes

Two forms of ventricular parasystole have been described in the literature, fixed parasystole and modulated parasystole. Fixed ventricular parasystole occurs when an ectopic pacemaker is protected by entrance block, and thus its activity is completely independent from the sinus pacemaker activity. Hence, the ectopic pacemaker is expected to fire at a fixed rate. Therefore, on ECG, the coupling intervals of the manifest ectopic beats will wander through the basic cycle of the sinus rhythm. Accordingly, the traditional electrocardiographic criteria used to recognize the fixed form of parasystole are:

- the presence of variable coupling intervals of the manifest ectopic beats;
- inter-ectopic intervals that are simple multiples of a common denominator;
- fusion beats.

According to the modulated parasystole hypothesis, rigid constancy of a pacemaker might be expected if the entrance block were complete, but if there is an escape route available for the emergence of ectopic activity, then clearly there must be an effective ionic communication, not complete insulation, between the two tissues. If there is an electrical communication between the two, then the depolarization of the surrounding ventricle may influence the ectopic pacemaker. That influence will be electrotonic; depolarization of the surrounding field will induce a partial depolarization of the pacemaker cells. Therefore, appropriate diagnosis of modulated parasystole relies upon the construction of a “phase response curve” as theoretical evidence of modulation of the ectopic pacemaker cycle length by the electrotonic activity generated by the sinus discharges across the area of protection. In this case, the timing of the arrival of the electronic stimulus will serve to delay or advance the subsequent pacemaker activation. In this case, the coupling intervals between the manifest ectopic and sinus discharges will be either fixed or variable, depending on the cycle length relations between the two pacemakers.

== See also ==
- Extrasystole
