= Grand Lodge of New York =

Organization of Freemasons in the U.S. state of New York

Grand Lodge of New York F. & A.M.
- Established: December 15, 1782
- Location: USA
- Region served: New York
- Grand Master: Robert L. Hogan, Jr.
- Website: www.nymasons.org

The Grand Lodge of New York, officially the Grand Lodge of Free and Accepted Masons of the State of New York, is the largest and oldest of several organizations of Freemasons that are based in the U.S. state of New York. The offices of the Grand Lodge are located at Masonic Hall in New York City.

The Grand Lodge of New York was founded December 15, 1782 and it acts as the coordinating body for many Masonic functions undertaken throughout the state. Its various committees organize the Masonic Home in Utica, the Livingston Masonic Library and various charitable events around New York State. In 2023, the Grand Lodge of New York had approximately 27,000 members among more than 400 lodges and an additional 9 lodges in Lebanon. The GLNY first began chartering lodges in Lebanon in 1924.

== History ==
=== Provincial Grand Lodge for the Premier Grand Lodge of England ===
The first documented presence of Freemasonry in New York dates from the early-1730s, when Daniel Coxe Jr. (1673–1739), was appointed by Thomas Howard, 8th Duke of Norfolk, the Grand Master of the Premier Grand Lodge of England, known to historians as the "Moderns", to act as a Provincial Grand Master for the provinces of New York, New Jersey, and Pennsylvania. No authenticated primary source records exist of his tenure as Provincial Grand Master, and he died a few years after his appointment. Thus, it seems doubtful that he exercised any real authority in Masonic endeavors.

From 1738 to the 1780s, additional Warrants were issued by the GLE, the Moderns, to Francis Goelet (1738–1753), George Harrison (1753–1771) and Sir John Johnson (1771–1783) to serve as Provincial Grandmaster. As Johnson was a supporter of the British during the American Revolution, he is believed to have taken his warrant with him when he fled to Canada, thus leaving the Moderns Lodges without a Provincial Grand Master.

=== Provincial Grand Lodge for the Antient Grand Lodge of England ===
To further complicate matters, by the 1750s, the Antient Grand Lodge of England, known to historians as the "Ancients", a rival Masonic Grand Lodge, had also created a Provincial Grand Lodge of New York, which subsequently chartered lodges under its own jurisdiction. Additional lodges were chartered in New York by the Grand Lodge of Scotland and the Grand Lodge of Ireland.

The Ancients retained their charter throughout the Revolution, and it was based upon this charter that an independent Grand Lodge of New York was created in 1781, with Robert R. Livingston as Grand Master. The Grand Lodge of New York was officially organized on December 15, 1782, under the Provincial Grand Warrant dated September 5, 1781, from the “Athol” or Antient Grand Lodge of England. The warrant was issued by John Murray, 4th Duke of Atholl who was serving as Grand Master of the Antient Grand Lodge of England at the time.

=== Grand Lodge of New York ===
The Grand Lodge declared its independence and assumed its modern title “Grand Lodge of Free and Accepted Masons of the State of New York” on June 6, 1787. While the "Athol" Charter descended from the "Ancients", Livingston himself was a member of a "Modern" Lodge. Thus the two rival Grand Lodge traditions, which in England did not unite until 1813, had already merged before that in New York State.

=== Grand Lodge buildings: 1826–1856, 1870–1909 and 1909–present ===
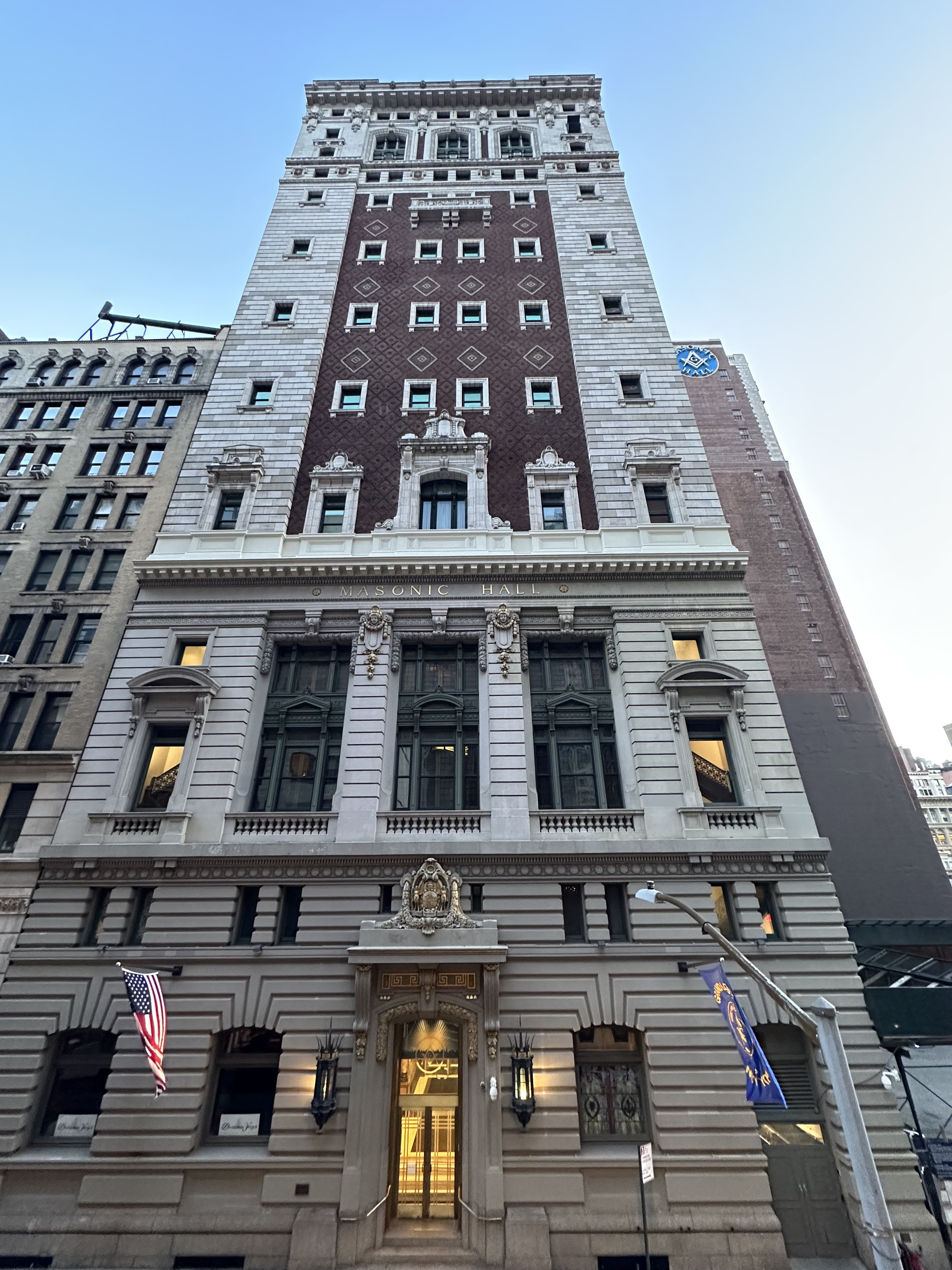
Façade of the 24th street building of the Masonic Hall in Manhattan

Early Masonic meetings and meetings of the Grand Lodge were likely held at taverns as well as an early iteration of Tammany Hall. On June 24, 1826 the cornerstone was laid for a Gothic style Masonic Hall on Broadway in lower Manhattan between Reade and Pearl Streets, directly across from the original site of the New York Hospital. This would serve as the home of the Grand Lodge until it the building was demolished in 1856. Perhaps the most important Masonic in this period was the merger of the Grand Lodge of New York with the St. John Grand Lodge, which took place at Tripler Hall on December 27, 1850.

Due to infighting in the Grand Lodge, the Panic of 1857, and the Civil War, it would not be until the 1870s, that the Grand Lodge would again have a permanent meeting location. In 1870, the cornerstone was laid for a new Second French Empire Style building which served as the headquarters of the Grand Lodge from 1875 to 1909.

The current Grand Lodge building is located at 23rd Street and 6th Avenue and was built in 1909, on the same site as the 1875 Grand Lodge Building. At the time, the building caused some controversy, and Past Grand Master James Ten Eyck resigned as Trustee of the Masonic Hall and Asylum Fund in an effort to convince the then sitting Grand Master Townsend Scudder that the construction of the building would be unwise.

== Notable lodges ==
St. John's Lodge No. 1, chartered on December 5, 1757, is the oldest operating Lodge under the jurisdiction of the Grand Lodge of New York. St. John's Lodge is the custodian of what is now known as the George Washington Inaugural Bible. On April 30, 1789, it was upon this Bible that George Washington took his oath of office as the first president of the United States. In 2009, the Lodge formed a registered public charity for the purpose of preserving, maintaining and restoring the George Washington Inaugural Bible. In 2014, the St. John's Lodge No. 1 Foundation, Inc. received recognition as an IRS 501(c)3.

Warren Lodge No. 32 has the distinction of being the New York's only remaining Full Moon Lodge, whereby its monthly meeting date is the "Thursday before every full moon", rather than on a set calendar day.

== Charity ==
The Grand Lodge of New York has a long history of supporting charitable causes. Among the organizations that are rooted in its charitable endeavors are, the Masonic Medical Research Institute, Acacia Village and Masonic Home in Utica; the Chancellor Robert R. Livingston Library and Museum in New York and Utica; the Masonic Youth Camp at Camp Turk in Woodgate; the DeWint House at Tappan and its many charitable activities of its annual Brotherhood Fund Drive. The Grand Lodge sponsors drug and alcohol awareness programs in schools, and gives thousands of dollars a day to worthy charities around the State.

== Relationships with other Masonic organizations ==
The Masonic youth group Organization of Triangles, Inc., was founded in New York in 1925.

Since 2001, the Grand Lodge of New York has had mutual recognition with the Prince Hall Grand Lodge of New York.

== Notable Past Grand Masters ==
As of 2026, the current Grand Master is Robert L. Hogan, Jr. Notable past Grand Masters are as follows:

- 1784–1800: Robert R. Livingston
- 1801–1805: Jacob Morton
- 1806–1819: DeWitt Clinton
- 1820–1821: Daniel D. Tompkins
- 1825–1829: Stephen Van Rensselaer
- 1830–1843: Morgan Lewis
- 1846–1849: John D. Willard
- 1853: Reuben H. Walworth
- 1876: James W. Husted
- 1879: Charles Roome
- 1883: J. Edward Simmons
- 1884: William A. Brodie
- 1895–1896: John Knox Stewart
- 1897–1898: William Andrew Sutherland
- 1906–1907: Townsend Scudder
- 1922–1923: Arthur S. Tompkins
- 1944–1945: Charles W. Froessel
Notable Past Grand Masters
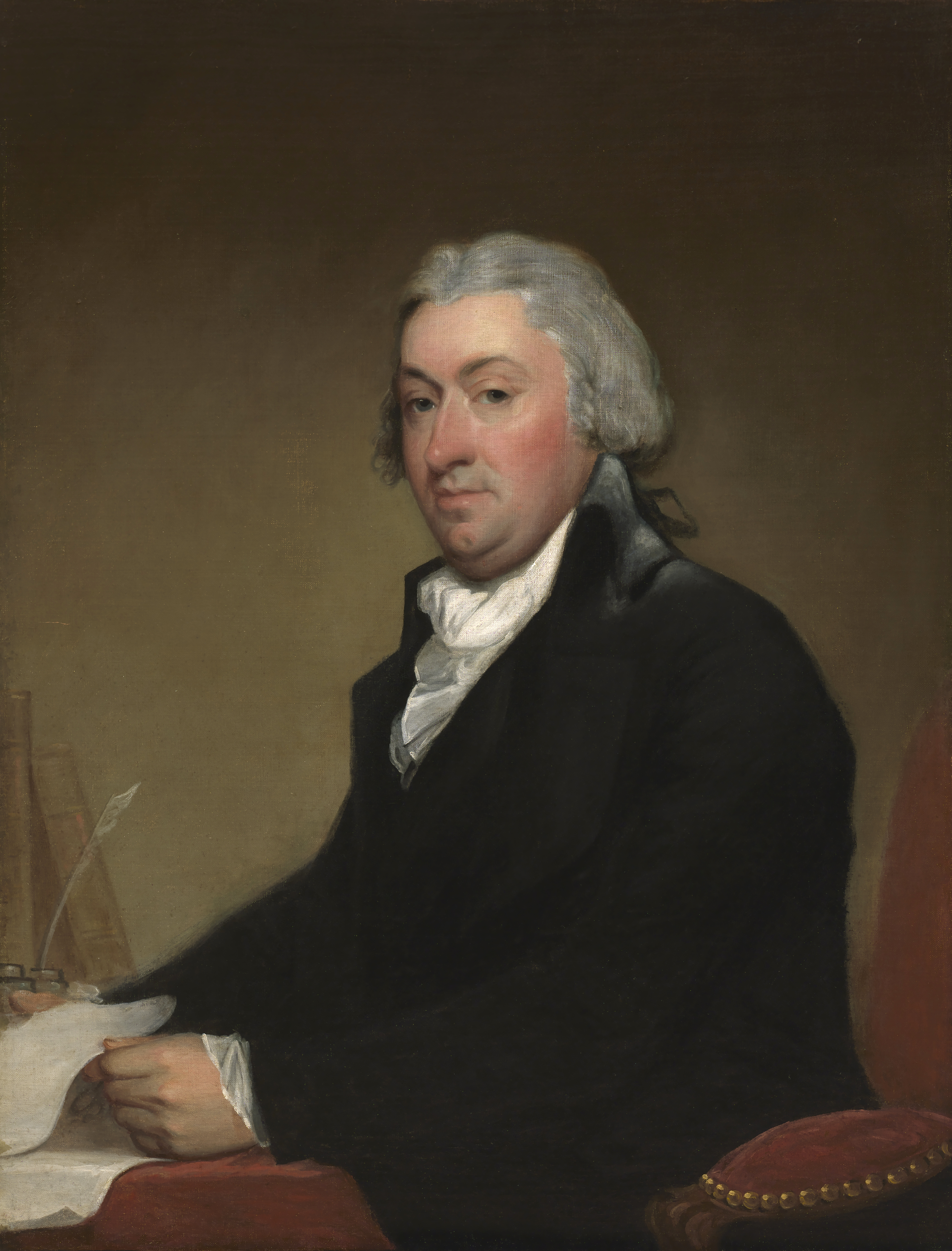
Robert R. Livingston, a Founding Father of the United States who co-drafted the Declaration of Independence, Grand Master from 1784 to 1800.

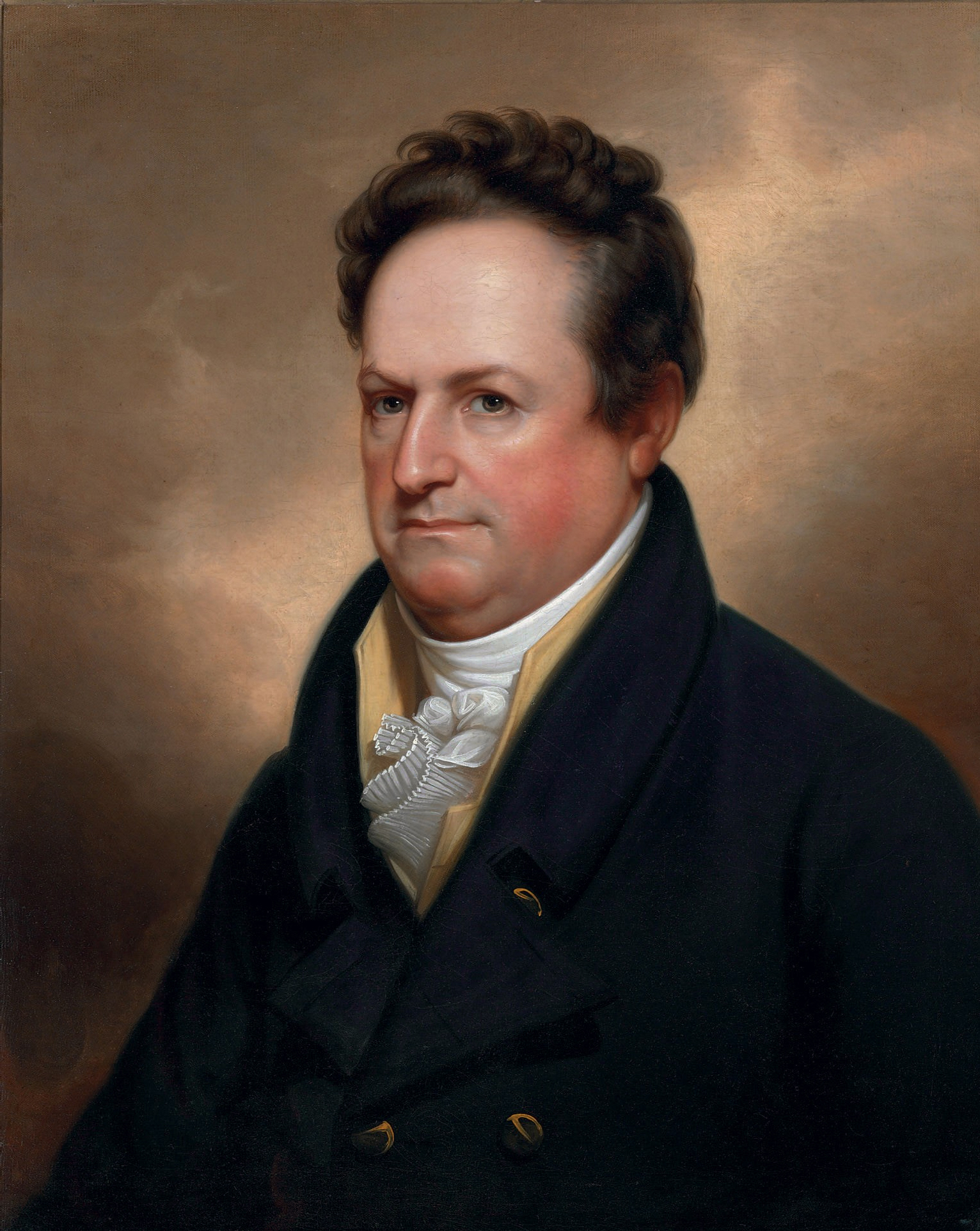
Portrait of DeWitt Clinton depicting DeWitt Clinton, Grand Master from 1806 to 1819. Served as Mayor of New York City and Governor of New York.

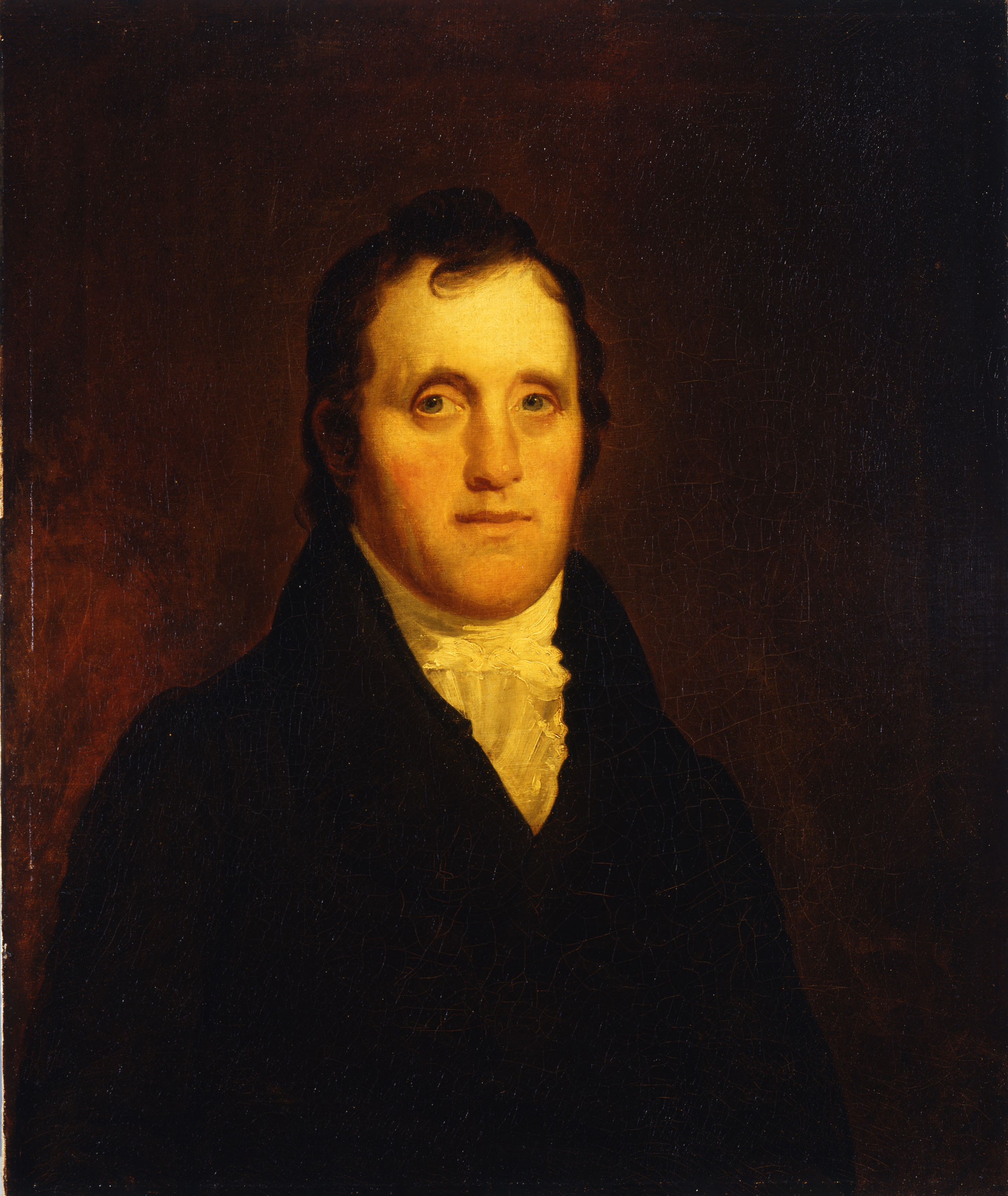
Daniel D. Tompkins, Vice President of the United States under James Monroe and New York Governor, Grand Master from 1820 to 1821.

Stephen Van Rensselaer III, US Representative who played a pivotal role in deciding the 1824 presidency in favor of John Quincy Adams, Grand Master from 1825 to 1829
