= Robert R. Livingston =

American lawyer, politician, and diplomat (1746–1813)

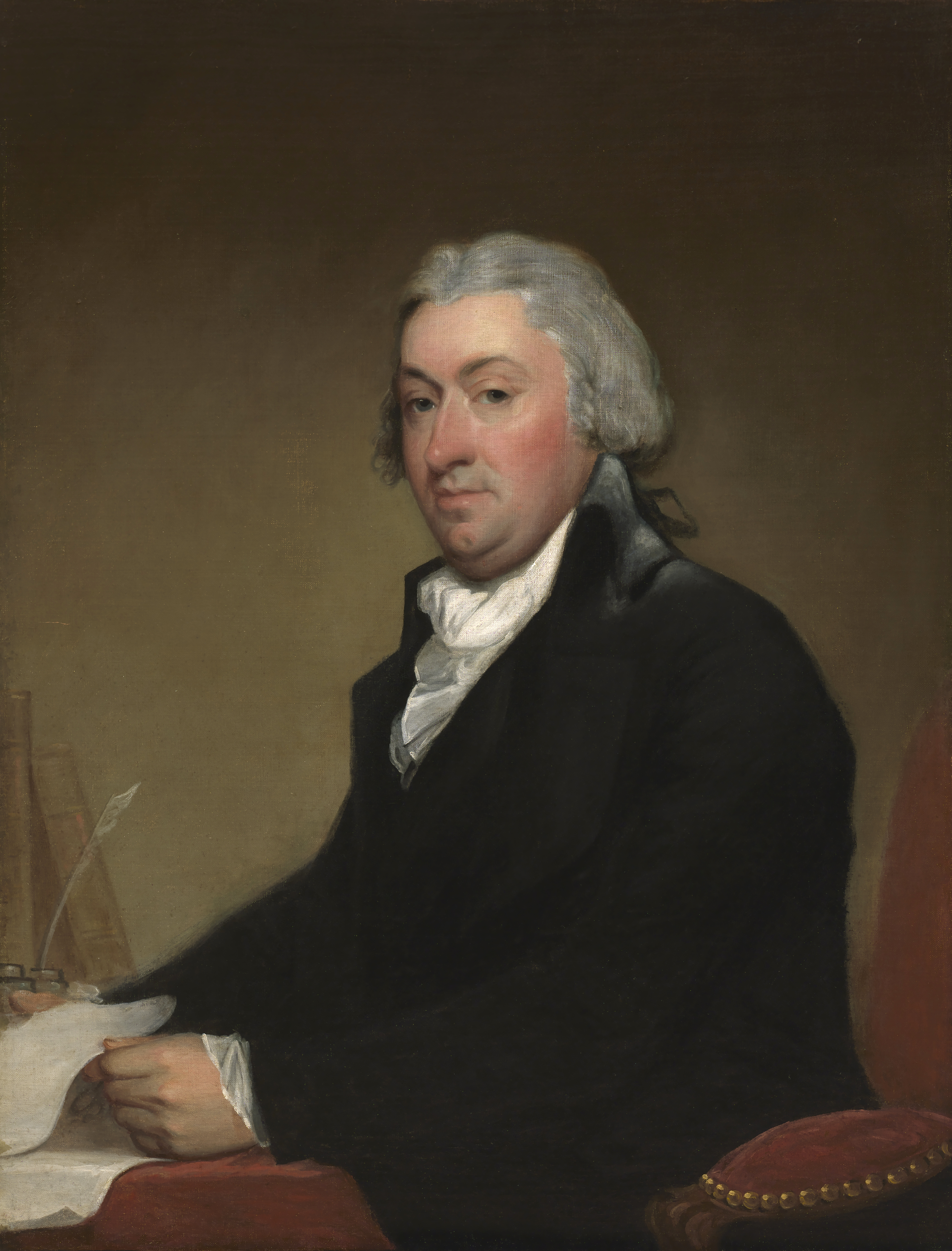
- Portrait after Gilbert Stuart, c. 1790

7th United States Minister to France
- In office December 6, 1801 – November 18, 1804
- President: Thomas Jefferson
- Preceded by: Charles Cotesworth Pinckney
- Succeeded by: John Armstrong

1st United States Secretary of Foreign Affairs
- In office October 20, 1781 – June 4, 1783
- Appointed by: Congress of the Confederation
- Preceded by: Position established
- Succeeded by: Elias Boudinot

1st Chancellor of New York
- In office July 30, 1777 – June 30, 1801
- Appointed by: Governor William Tryon
- Governor: George Clinton; John Jay
- Preceded by: Position established
- Succeeded by: John Lansing

Recorder of New York City
- In office October 13, 1773 – 1774
- Preceded by: Thomas Jones
- Succeeded by: John Watts Jr.

Personal details
- Born: November 27, 1746 New York City, New York, British America
- Died: February 26, 1813 (aged 66) Clermont, New York, U.S.
- Party: Democratic-Republican
- Spouse: Mary Stevens (m. 1770)
- Children: 2
- Relatives: Robert Livingston (father); Edward Livingston (brother); Robert Livingston (grandfather)
- Education: Columbia College (BA)

Robert Robert (Note: At the time, the Livingston family used their father's first names as middle names to distinguish the numerous members of the family, as a form of patronymic. Since Robert and his father had the same name, he never spelled out the middle name but always used only the initial.) Livingston (November 27 [O.S. November 16] 1746 – February 26, 1813) was an American lawyer, politician, and diplomat from New York, as well as a Founding Father of the United States. He was known as "The Chancellor" after the high New York state legal office he held for 25 years. He was a member of the Committee of Five that drafted the Declaration of Independence, along with Thomas Jefferson, Benjamin Franklin, John Adams, and Roger Sherman, but was recalled by the state of New York before he could sign the document. Livingston administered the oath of office to George Washington when he assumed the presidency April 30, 1789. Livingston was also elected as a member of the American Philosophical Society in 1801.

== Early life and education ==
Livingston was the eldest son of Judge Robert Livingston (1718–1775) and Margaret (née Beekman) Livingston, uniting two wealthy Hudson River Valley families. He had two brothers and five sisters, all of whom wed and made their homes on the Hudson River near the family seat at Clermont Manor. Among his siblings were his younger brother, Edward Livingston (1764-1836), who also served as U.S. Minister to France and Secretary of State, his sister Gertrude Livingston (1757–1833), who married Governor Morgan Lewis (1754–1844), sister Janet Livingston (d. 1824), who married Richard Montgomery (1738–1775), sister Alida Livingston (1761–1822), who married John Armstrong, Jr. (1758–1843) (who succeeded him as U.S. Minister to France), and sister Joanna Livingston (1759–1827), who married Peter R. Livingston (1766–1847).

His paternal grandparents were Robert Livingston (1688–1775) of Clermont and Margaret Howarden (1693–1758). His great-grandparents were Robert Livingston the Elder (1654–1728) and Alida (née Schuyler) Van Rensselaer Livingston, daughter of Philip Pieterse Schuyler (1628–1683). His grand-uncle was Philip Livingston (1686–1749), the 2nd Lord of Livingston Manor. Livingston, a member of a large and prominent family, was known for continually quarreling with his relatives.

Livingston graduated from King's College (Note: King's College was renamed Columbia College of Columbia University following the American Revolution in 1784.) in June 1765 and was admitted to the bar in 1773.

== Career ==
=== Recorder of New York City ===
In October 1773, Livingston was appointed recorder of New York City but soon thereafter identified himself with the anti-colonial Whig Party and was replaced a few months later by John Watts, Jr.

=== Chancellor of New York ===
On July 30, 1777, Livingston became the first chancellor of New York, which was then the highest judicial officer in the state. Concurrently, he served from 1781 to 1783 as the first United States Secretary of Foreign Affairs under the Articles of Confederation. Livingston administered the presidential oath of office to George Washington at his first inauguration on April 30, 1789, at Federal Hall in New York City, which was then the nation's capital.

In 1789, Livingston joined the Jeffersonian Republicans (later known as the Democratic-Republicans), forming an uneasy alliance with his previous rival George Clinton and Aaron Burr, then a political newcomer. Livingston opposed the Jay Treaty and other initiatives of the Federalist Party, founded and led by his former colleagues Alexander Hamilton and John Jay. He ran for governor of New York as a Democratic-Republican, unsuccessfully challenging incumbent governor John Jay in the 1798 election.

After serving as chancellor for almost 24 years, Livingston left office on June 30, 1801. During that period, he became nationally known by his title alone as "The Chancellor", and even after leaving office, he was respectfully addressed as Chancellor Livingston for the remainder of his life.

=== Declaration of Independence ===
The Committee of Five stands at the center of John Trumbull's 1817 painting Declaration of Independence. Thomas Jefferson is depicted presenting the draft Declaration to Congress with Benjamin Franklin at his side. Behind them are, from left to right, John Adams, Roger Sherman, and Livingston.

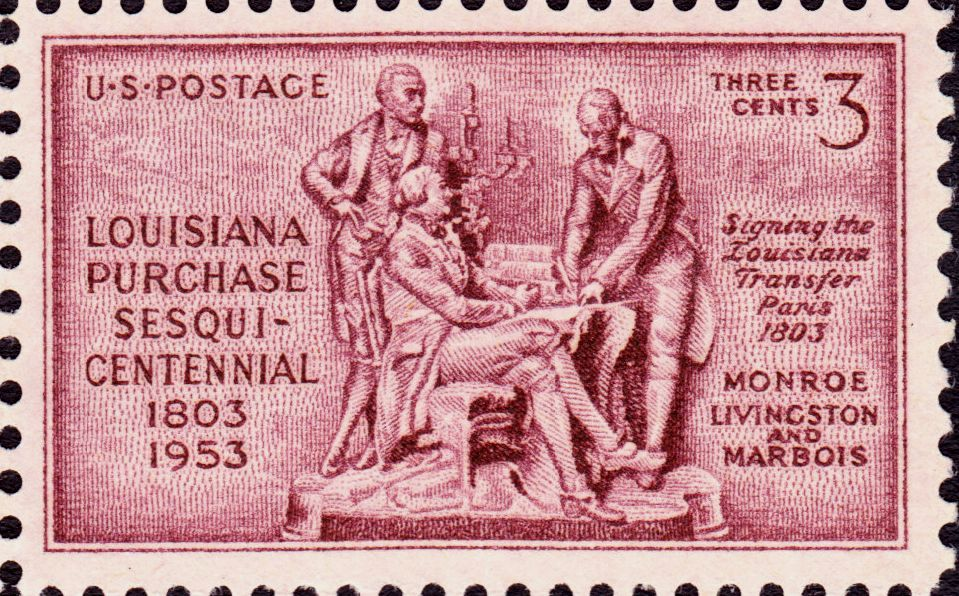
Livingston is depicted on the 1953 postage stamp commemorating the signing of the Louisiana Purchase

On June 11, 1776, Livingston was appointed to a committee of the Second Continental Congress, known as the Committee of Five, which was given the task of drafting the Declaration of Independence. After establishing a general outline for the document, the committee decided that Jefferson would write the first draft. The committee reviewed Jefferson's draft, making extensive changes, before presenting Jefferson's revised draft to Congress on June 28, 1776. Before he could sign the final version of the Declaration, Livingston was recalled by his state. However, he sent his cousin, Philip Livingston, to sign the document in his place. Another cousin, William Livingston, would go on to sign the United States Constitution.

=== U.S. Minister to France ===
Following Thomas Jefferson's election as President of the United States, once Jefferson became president on March 4, 1801, he appointed Livingston U.S. minister to France. Serving from 1801 to 1804, Livingston negotiated the Louisiana Purchase. After the signing of the Louisiana Purchase agreement in 1803, Livingston made this memorable statement:

We have lived long but this is the noblest work of our whole lives ... The United States takes rank this day among the first powers of the world.

During his time as U.S. minister to France, Livingston met Robert Fulton, with whom he developed the first viable steamboat, the North River Steamboat, whose home port was at the Livingston family home of Clermont Manor in the town of Clermont, New York. On her maiden voyage, she left New York City with him as a passenger, stopped briefly at Clermont Manor, and continued to Albany up the Hudson River, completing in just under 60 hours a journey that had previously taken nearly a week by sloop sailboat. In 1811, Fulton and Livingston became members of the Erie Canal Commission.

=== Freemasonry and the Society of Cincinnati ===
Livingston was a Freemason, and in 1784, he was appointed the first Grand Master of the Grand Lodge of New York, retaining this title until 1801. The Grand Lodge's library in Manhattan bears his name. The Bible Livingston used to administer the oath of office to President Washington is owned by St. John's Lodge No. 1 and is still used today when the Grand Master is sworn in, and, by request, when a President of the United States is sworn in.

On July 4, 1786, he was part of the second group elected as honorary members of the New York Society of the Cincinnati, along with Chief Justice Richard Morris, Judge James Duane, Continental Congressman William Duer, and Justice John Sloss Hobart.

== Personal life ==
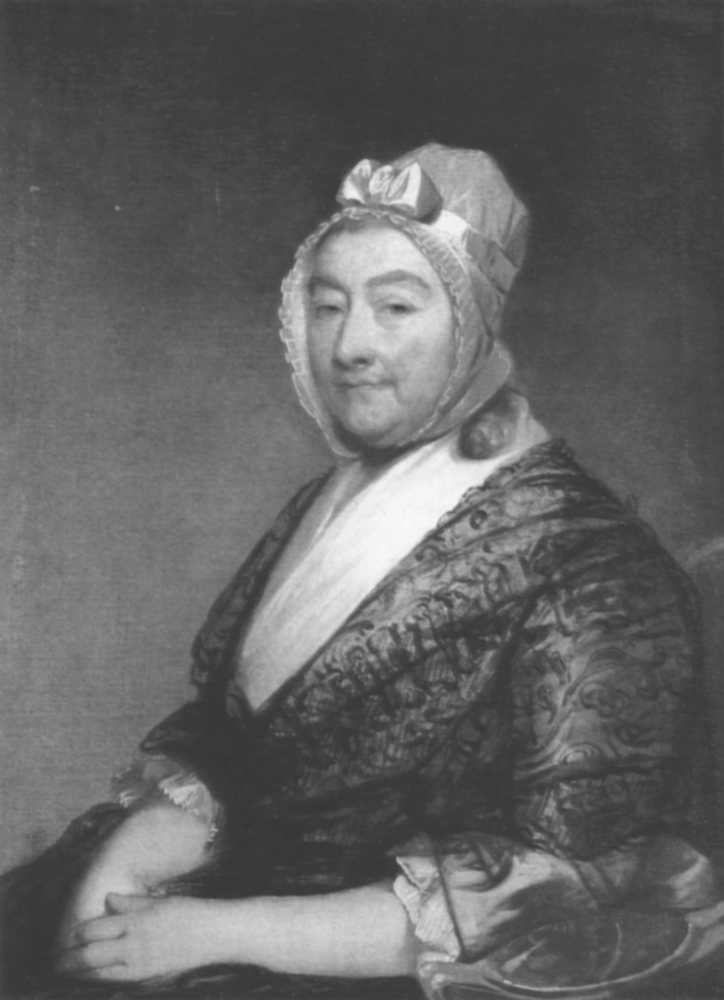
Margaret Beekman Livingston, mother of Chancellor Robert R. Livingston

On September 9, 1770, Livingston married Mary Stevens (1751–1814), the daughter of Continental Congressman John Stevens and sister of the inventor John Stevens III. Following their marriage, he built a home south of Clermont, called Belvedere, which was burned to the ground along with Clermont in 1777 by British forces under General John Burgoyne. In 1794, he built a new home called New Clermont, which was subsequently renamed Arryl House, a phonetic spelling of his initials "RRL", which was deemed "the most commodious home in America" and contained a library of four thousand volumes. Together, Robert and Mary were the parents of:

- Elizabeth Stevens Livingston (1780–1829), who married Lt. Governor Edward Philip Livingston (1779–1843), the grandson of Philip Livingston, on November 20, 1799.
- Margaret Maria Livingston (1783–1818), who married Robert L. Livingston (1775–1843), the son of Walter Livingston and Cornelia Schuyler, on July 10, 1799.

Livingston was a slaveowner, with the 1790 United States census recording him as owning at least 15 slaves, some of whom were enslaved at Clermont. When he served on the Council of Revision, Livingston vetoed legislation which would have gradually abolished slavery in New York but also would have prohibited Black Americans from voting or holding public office. He once wrote that Free Negros could not "be deprived of those essential rights without shocking the principle of equal liberty", arguing that "Rendering power permanent and hereditary in the hands of persons who deduce their origins from white ancestors only" would establish a "malignant... aristocracy." In his September 1796 will, Livingston stipulated that all of his slaves over 30 years old should be manumitted while those who were younger could be manumitted under certain conditions. The 1810 United States census recorded him as owning at least five slaves.

== Death ==
Livingston died a natural death aged 66 on February 26, 1813, and was buried in the Clermont Livingston vault at St. Paul's Church in Tivoli, New York.

=== Livingston family ===
Through his eldest daughter Elizabeth he was the grandfather of four:

- Margaret Livingston (1808–1874), who married David Augustus Clarkson (1793–1850)
- Elizabeth Livingston (1813–1896), who married Edward Hunter Ludlow (1810–1884)
- Clermont Livingston (1817–1895), who married Cornelia Livingston (1824–1851)
- Robert Edward Livingston (1820–1889), who married Susan Maria Clarkson de Peyster (1823–1910)

== Legacy and honors ==
- Livingston County, Kentucky, and Livingston County, New York, are named after him.
- A statue of Livingston by Erastus Dow Palmer was commissioned by the state of New York and placed in the National Statuary Hall collection of the U.S. Capitol building, according to the tradition of each state selecting two individuals from the state to be so honored.
- Livingston is included on the Jefferson Memorial pediment sculpture by Adolph Alexander Weinman, which honors the Committee of Five.
- The Robert Livingston high-rise building at 85 Livingston St. in Brooklyn is named for him.
- The Chancellor Robert R. Livingston Masonic Library of the Grand Lodge of the State of New York is named in his honor, and is house at Masonic Hall in New York City.

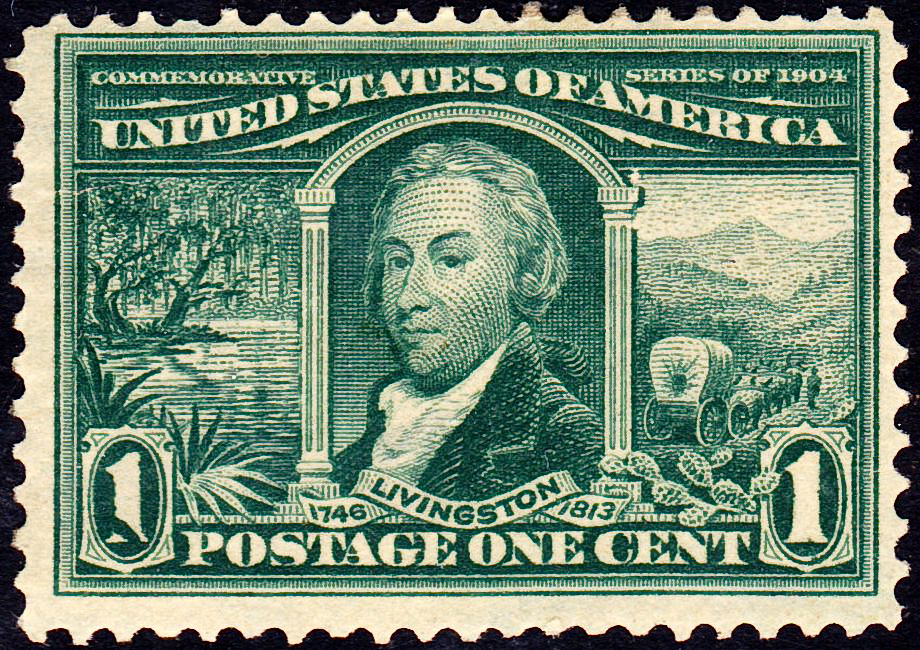
Robert Livingston Issue of 1904

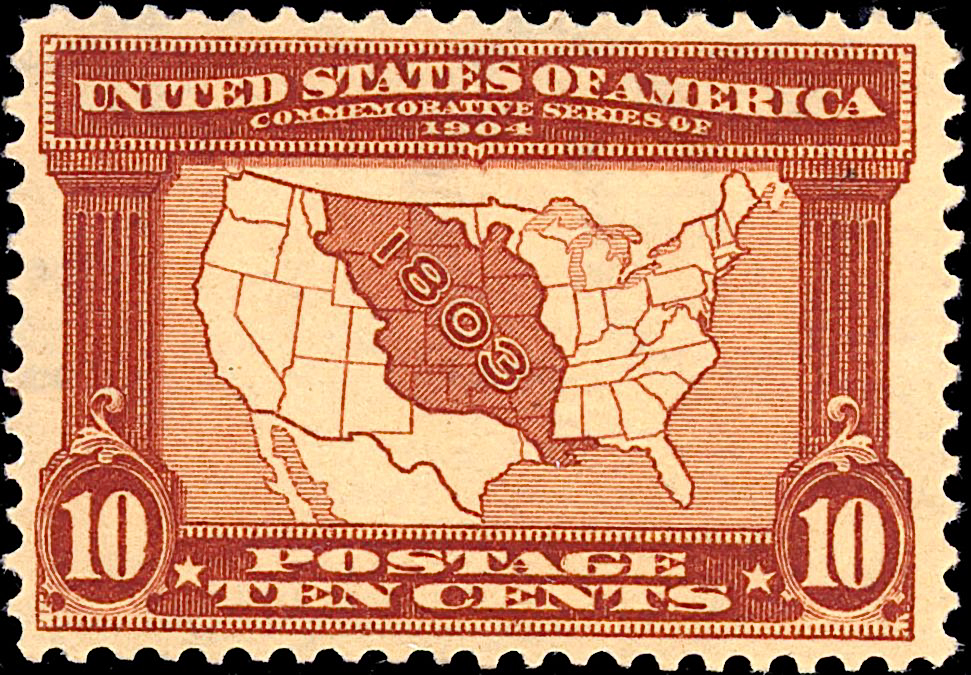
Map of Louisiana Purchase Issue of 1904

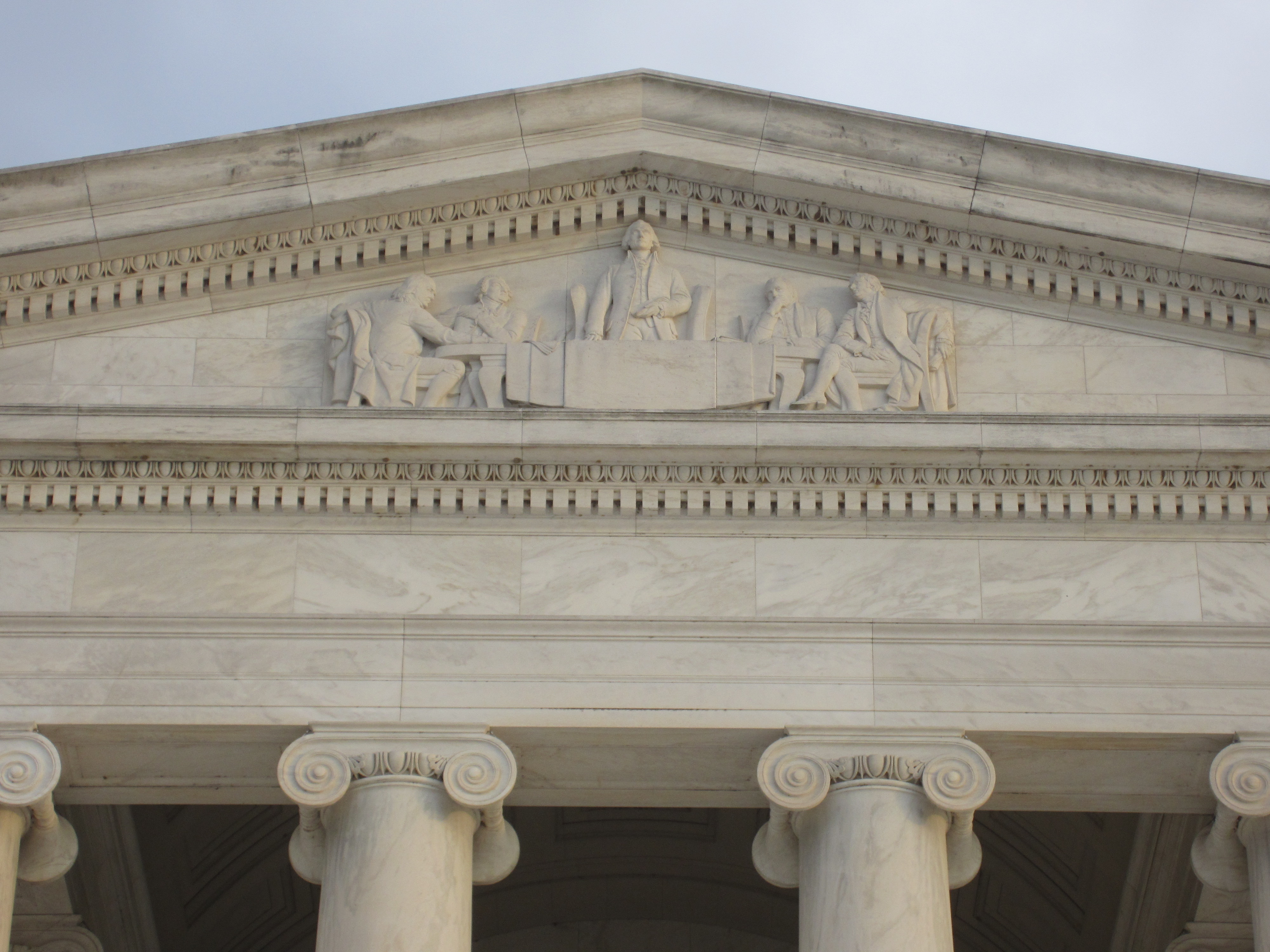
The Jefferson Memorial's pediment and its sculpture of the Committee of Five

== See also ==
- Livingston family

== Explanatory notes ==
Party political offices
Preceded by Robert Yates	Democratic-Republican nominee for Governor of New York; 1798	Succeeded by George Clinton
Legal offices
Preceded by Thomas Jones	Recorder of New York City; 1773–1774	Succeeded by John Watts
New office	Chancellor of New York; 1777–1801	Succeeded by John Lansing
Political offices
New office	United States Secretary of Foreign Affairs; 1781–1783	Succeeded by John Jay
Diplomatic posts
Preceded by Charles Pinckney	United States Minister to France; 1801–1804	Succeeded by John Armstrong
