= Joshua Casteel =

US soldier, lecturer, and writer

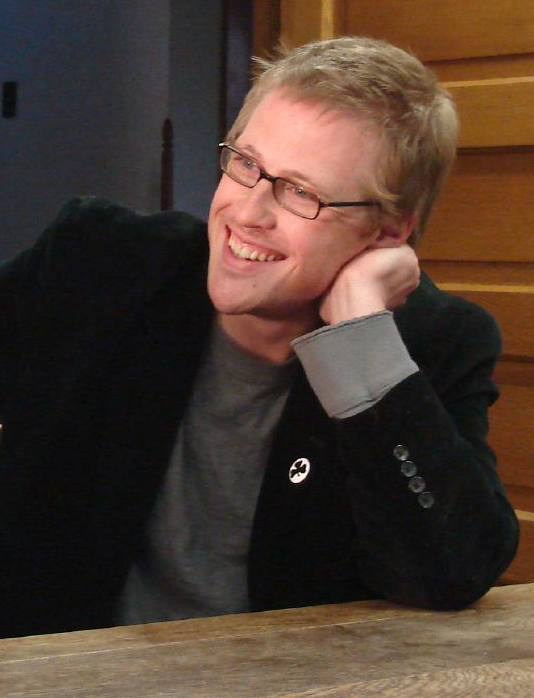
- Joshua Casteel at the Catholic Worker house in South Bend, IN, March 2007. Photo by Jim Forest.
- Born: Joshua Eric Casteel; 27 December 1979; Sioux Falls, South Dakota
- Died: 25 August 2012 (aged 32); New York, New York
- Burial place: Cedar Rapids, Iowa
- Military career
- Allegiance: United States of America
- Branch: United States Army
- Service years: 1997–2005
- Rank: Sergeant
- Unit: 202nd Military Intelligence Battalion
- Conflicts: Iraq War

Joshua Casteel (27 December 1979 – 25 August 2012) was a United States Army soldier, conscientious objector, playwright, and divinity student. He volunteered for the Army as a teenager and later conducted interrogations in Abu Ghraib prison.

In 2005 he received an honorable discharge as a conscientious objector. He was active in the anti-war movement before dying of lung cancer in 2012. His cancer may have been caused by the inhalation of toxic fumes from the burn pits he guarded and slept by while he served in the Iraqi war.

== Early life ==
Casteel was born in Sioux Falls, South Dakota, and raised in Cedar Rapids, Iowa, in a Pentecostal family although he also prayed with his mother to Mary as a child. When he was seven years old Casteel attended Iowa caucus events and by high school he was president of a local chapter of the Young Republicans. Casteel was active in the local community theatre, Theatre Cedar Rapids, where he had lead roles in Joseph and the Technicolor Dreamcoat and The Who's Tommy.

== Army career ==
When Casteel was seventeen years old, he enlisted as an Army reservist in the delayed entry program to improve his chances of being admitted to the US Military Academy at West Point. Casteel did win an appointment to West Point and began his studies there in June 1998 but dropped out in his first term. Casteel attended Colorado Christian University for the 1999-2000 academic year before transferring to the University of Iowa.

In May 2002, the same month he graduated from the University of Iowa, Casteel began his training as an interrogator at Fort Huachuca in September of that year. Following completion of the basic interrogator course he studied Arabic at the Defense Language Institute in Monterey, California.

While in Monterey, Casteel befriended Father William Martin, an Episcopal priest, and once more thought about seeking ordination and, perhaps, serving as an Army chaplain. During that time period Casteel also attended a lecture by theologian Stanley Hauerwas. After the lecture, Casteel asked Hauerwas "what a Christian already enlisted in the military should do." Hauerwas advised that Casteel "should leave the military right away—get as far away from it as possible."

In May 2004, he was admitted to the Graduate Theological Union. Two weeks later Casteel's Army Reserve unit was ordered to active duty. His unit arrived in Iraq six weeks after revelation of abuses by US personnel at the Abu Ghraib prison. Casteel served with the Army's 202nd Military Intelligence Battalion as an interrogator at the prison. He stated he had conducted over 130 prisoner interrogations there. He was promoted to sergeant in August 2004.

=== Becoming a conscientious objector ===
To take another’s life is the quintessential statement of divine judgment, and faithlessness toward the possibility of reconciliation and redemption. It is better for a righteous man to die at the hands of an enemy than to defend himself with lethal force, because the mere entity of life itself is not what is of greatest importance, but rather the manner of one’s living—living virtuously and loving all, especially enemies.

— Joshua Casteel, from his conscientious objector application

In October 2004, Casteel interrogated "a self-professed jihadist" from Saudi Arabia. Casteel later described his encounter "with the prisoner as almost mystical, an apotheosis." When Casteel asked the Saudi prisoner "why he'd come to Iraq to kill" the jihadist turned the tables and asked Casteel, "Why did you come to Iraq to kill?" He further claimed that Casteel failed to "follow Christ to pray for those who persecute you, or pray for your enemies" and "to turn the other cheek, to love those who hate you." The experience provoked a spiritual crisis in Casteel leading him to apply for conscientious objector (CO) status.

After Casteel applied for CO status, he was assigned to guarding a burn pit. He left Iraq and returned to Iowa in January 2005. Six months after applying, the Army approved his application as a CO and granted him an honorable discharge in May 2005.

== Post-army career ==
Casteel graduated from the University of Iowa in 2008 with a dual master of fine arts degree in playwriting and non-fiction writing. He was enrolled at the University of Chicago's Divinity School in 2010. Casteel converted from Pentecostalism to the Anglo-Catholic form of Anglicanism before eventually converting to Roman Catholicism. As a public speaker on religious and political matters, Casteel addressed audiences in the US, Ireland, Sweden, Italy and the UK.

He was an active member of Iraq Veterans Against the War. Casteel was featured in the documentary films Iraq for Sale: The War Profiteers and Soldiers of Conscience.

In 2019, a Smithsonian article entitled "The Priest of Abu Ghraib" profiled Casteel and discussed his theological struggles while interrogating Muslim prisoners in Iraq. The author, Jennifer Percy, met Casteel in 2009 when they were classmates in the Iowa Writers' Workshop.

=== Stage performances & writings ===
Joining the army is not a sacrament, it's a pagan allegiance.

— Joshua Casteel, Letters from Abu Ghraib (1st ed.)

On 19 June 2006, Casteel shared the bill with Václav Havel, Harold Pinter, Tom Stoppard, and Jeremy Irons at the Royal Court Theatre for his solo performance of his play, The Interrogation Room. In May 2007, the play was again performed in New York City on the Atlantic Theater's Stage Two as part of the National MFA Playwright's Festival. Casteel's Returns: A Play in One Act was performed at the University of Iowa, Columbia College Chicago, De Balie (Amsterdam), and at Princeton University. The Alaska Quarterly Review published Returns in 2008.

Also in 2008, excerpts of Casteel's emails from Iraq were published in Harper's Magazine and in book form as Letters from Abu Ghraib with a foreword by Christopher Merrill. In the fall of 2008, the Virginia Quarterly Review published "Combat Multipliers", a reflection by Casteel on a mural adorning the Army chapel at Abu Ghraib and an attack by insurgents on the compound while he was assigned there. A second edition of Letters from Abu Ghraib was published in 2017 by Cascade Books with a new foreword by Stanley Hauerwas.

== Death ==
Casteel died of lung cancer in New York City in New York-Presbyterian Hospital on 25 August 2012. An oncologist told Casteel's mother that "Joshua died of lung cancer without having any of the conventional risk factors such as smoking, asbestos exposure or radiation ... I am quite sure we did not have anyone younger with lung cancer those five years I worked at the VA." Casteel's family believes his cancer was the result of exposure to toxins released by a burn pit he slept near for six months in Iraq. He was a University of Chicago Divinity School graduate student at the time of his death.
