= Warren Lodge No. 32 =

- Warren Masonic Lodge #32
- U.S. National Register of Historic Places
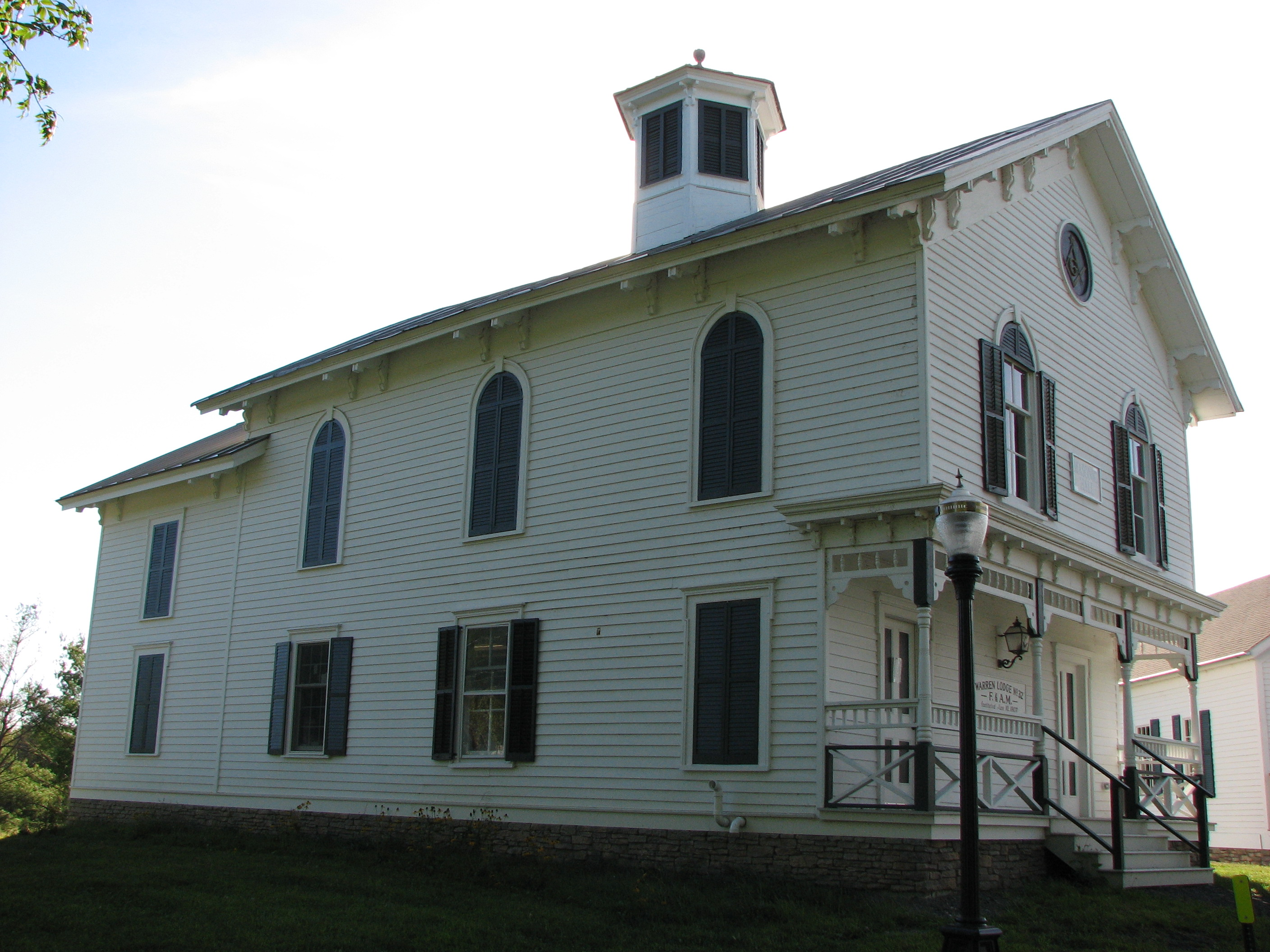
- East elevation, north (front) profile, 2014

- Location within New York Location within the United States
- Location: 1215 Centre Rd., Schultzville, New York
- Coordinates: 41°53′01″N 73°48′15″W
- Area: less than one acre
- Built: 1865
- Architectural style: Italianate
- NRHP reference No.: 07000491
- Added to NRHP: June 5, 2007

Warren Lodge No. 32 is a historic Masonic lodge which meets in a Masonic temple located on Centre Road in Schultzville, New York. The Lodge was named for Revolutionary War hero Joseph Warren (1741–1775).

The lodge has the distinction of being the New York's only remaining "Moon Lodge," whereby its monthly meeting date is the Thursday before every full moon rather than on a set calendar day.

== History ==
Warren Lodge was chartered on June 10, 1807 by DeWitt Clinton, Grand Master of the Grand Lodge of New York and is the oldest existing lodge in Dutchess County. It was first located in Millerton and over its first 50 years met in several locations Dutchess County.

=== Schultzville ===
In 1862, Theodore Schultz passed away and left the lodge land and $2,000 to build a lodge hall. In 1865, Warren Lodge's hall was constructed, a historic two-story wooden-frame building in the Italianate style of architecture with a central hexagonal cupola. It was originally located at 1144 Centre Road. The first floor is a social hall while the lodge room is on the second. In the early 1900s, a one-story addition was made on the rear of the building, which was removed during the 2011 move.

In 1999, Warren Lodge sold the building to the Town of Clinton Historical Society. On June 5, 2007, the building was listed on the National Register of Historic Places as "Warren Masonic Lodge #32".

=== Move down the street ===
In 2011, the Town of Clinton Historical Society sold the building to the Town of Clinton and moved it to their property. Warren Lodge No. 32 is still able to use the building for its meetings and functions. The current address is 1215 Centre Road in Schultzville, New York.
