= Orchestra Iowa =

American symphony orchestra in Cedar Rapids, Iowa

- Logo
- Former name: Cedar Rapids Symphony Orchestra.
- Founded: 1923; 103 years ago
- Location: Cedar Rapids, Iowa, United States
- Concert hall: Paramount Theatre
- Principal conductor: Timothy Hankewich
- Website: www.artsiowa.com/orchestra-iowa/

Orchestra Iowa is an American symphony orchestra based in Cedar Rapids, Iowa. The current music director and conductor is Timothy Hankewich. Established in 1923 as the Cedar Rapids Symphony Orchestra, the orchestra has 68 professional musicians and a full season of over 180 performances, including a Masterworks series, a Chamber series, a Pops series, and performances with the Cedar Rapids Opera and Ballet Quad Cities. The orchestra principally performs at the Paramount Theatre located in downtown Cedar Rapids. They also perform Masterworks and Chamber Concerts in the Iowa City/Coralville area including the Coralville Center for the Performing Arts in Coralville, Iowa. The orchestra showcases its artistic excellence each season through an accomplished array of classical, ballet, opera, popular and chamber performances, in addition to extensive community education and involvement.

== History ==
Orchestra Iowa began as the Cedar Rapids Symphony Orchestra. Its first concert was held on April 23, 1923, in the Sinclair Auditorium at Coe College, with general admission costing $0.75 and season tickets for $5. By 1928 the orchestra was playing its concerts at Veterans Memorial Coliseum. They continued playing during the Great Depression and World War II. It was not until the 1950s that the orchestra had a paid music director and began to pay the musicians. A string quartet was established in the 1970s. By 1980 the orchestra moved to its current location at the Paramount Theatre. The orchestra has an outreach program to area students and the Orchestra Iowa School was begun in 1988 to teach instrumentalists of all ages and experience levels. An endowment program was begun in 1990.

In 2004 the administrative offices and the school moved to its current location on Third Ave, next to the Paramount Theatre. Orchestra Iowa has partnered with nationally syndicated From the Top radio program, Iowa Public Television, and Iowa Public Radio to bring symphonic music and music education programs to more people. The building was extensively damaged in 2008 by the flooded Cedar River that submerged downtown Cedar Rapids. The orchestra had to perform in a variety of venues as a result. They returned to the Paramount Theatre for the 2012–2013 season.

Paramount Theatre

Orchestra Iowa became the orchestra for the Cedar Rapids Opera Theatre in 2009. The Opus Concert Café, which opened in 2011, provides a space for chamber concerts and other performances. With the 2012–2013 season they began a collaboration with Ballet Quad Cities. They perform with the ballet at both the Paramount Theatre in Cedar Rapids, and at the ballet's main performance venue the Adler Theatre in Davenport, Iowa.

== Music directors ==
- Joseph H. Kitchen (1923–1952)
- Henry Denecke (1952–1970)
- Richard Williams (1970–1981)
- Christian Tiemeyer (1981–2006)
- Timothy Hankewich (2006–present)
