= William J. Brodie =

American politician

William J. Brodie (born c. 1840) was an American legislator in South Carolina during the Reconstruction era. He was identified as a mullato bricklayer who was literate. Another document lists him as a carpenter. He served in the South Carolina House of Representatives from 1876 until 1880.

A native of South Carolina, he represented Charleston County. A Republican, he was listed with other candidates of the Union Republican ticket for the 1878 election.

In 1876, he was appointed to a committee investigating the South Carolina Supreme Court members for possible actions warranting impeachment.
