= List of Masonic libraries =

There are a number of libraries that collect and display books and items related to Freemasonry. Notable libraries, sometimes coupled with a museum, include:

== United Kingdom ==
- Museum of Freemasonry, Freemasons' Hall, London

== United States ==
- Center for Fraternal Collections and Research, Indiana University, Bloomington, Indiana
- George Washington Masonic National Memorial, Alexandria, Virginia
- Grand Lodge of Pennsylvania, Library and Museum, Philadelphia, Pennsylvania
- House of the Temple, Washington, DC
- Iowa Masonic Library and Museum, Cedar Rapids, Iowa
- Masonic Library and Museum of Indiana, Indianapolis Masonic Temple, Indianapolis, Indiana
- Scottish Rite Masonic Museum & Library, Lexington, Massachusetts

A more complete listing can be found on the website of the Masonic Library and Museum Association.
