= Davenport RiverCenter =

Convention center

RiverCenter
- Interactive map of RiverCenter
- Address: 136 E. Third St.
- Location: Davenport, Iowa
- Coordinates: 41.522778°N 90.572778°W
- Owner: City of Davenport
- Public transit: Davenport CitiBus

Construction
- Opened: 1983
- Expanded: 1993

Website
- www.riverctr.com

RiverCenter is a convention center located in downtown Davenport, Iowa, United States. It is made up of two buildings sited on the north and south sides of East Third Street connected by a skywalk. The Adler Theatre is connected to the original section of the convention center on the north side of the complex.

== History ==
Planning for the RiverCenter began in the late 1970s. The working name for the facility was the “Community Activity Center," also known as “Superblock.” The facility was built in the early 1980s and opened in 1983. It was designed in a modern, open industrial look. The original building connected the Adler Theatre on the west and the Blackhawk Hotel on the east. Together they formed a convention and entertainment complex for the Quad City area. The facility offered 20,500 square feet (1,900 m^{2}) of space in a large hall and six breakout rooms. An atrium was built over what was Perry Street.

Minimalist artist Sol LeWitt was commissioned to provide artwork for the RiverCenter. He created Tower 1984 and two wall drawings. They were Davenport's first public art project. The tower, which was designed for a plaza that was never built, was moved to the plaza in front of the Figge Art Museum in October 2004 and one of the wall drawings was moved to the museum at a later date.

A feasibility study was conducted and it was determined that the RiverCenter could be expanded. In the fall of 1993, the expansion opened on the south side of East Third Street, across the street from the Blackhawk Hotel. It was also designed in a modern industrial look and added 49,000 square feet (4,600 m^{2}) to the facility. A second atrium covered Perry Street, another large hall, four break out rooms and an executive board room were added. A skywalk above East Third Street connected the two sections of the facility. Kaiserslautern Square Park, named for one of Davenport's sister cities, was built to the west of the new building. The expansion of the RiverCenter was paid for in part by contributions from Riverboat Gambling, which came to the area in 1991. The Perry Park Green Space was completed on the south side of the building along East Second Street in 2002

The convention center and the theater are owned by the city of Davenport and they have been operated by VenuWorks of Ames, Iowa since 1998.

== Adler Theatre ==
The Adler Theatre is a 2,400-seat performing arts center. It opened as the RKO Orpheum Theater on November 25, 1931. The Art Deco style theater was designed by A.S. Graven of Chicago. Henry Dreyfuss of New York City designed the interior. Restoration of the old RKO Orpheum began in 1981. Lee Enterprises made a $1 million contribution for an endowment. The theater was renamed the Adler after newspaper publishers E.P. Adler and his son Philip, both of whom led Lee Enterprises. Renovations, which included increasing the size of the stage, took place in 2005 and 2006. The theater is home to the Quad City Symphony Orchestra and Ballet Quad Cities. It hosts Broadway touring companies and other productions and performances. The theater and the former Hotel Mississippi, which surrounds it, are listed on the National Register of Historic Places as the Hotel Mississippi-RKO Orpheum Theater.

== Quad Cities Event Center ==
On September 22, 2010, the RiverCenter/Adler Theatre, Hotel Blackhawk, and the Radisson Quad City Plaza Hotel announced a cooperative marketing agreement branding themselves the “Quad Cities Event Center.” While each remains a separate entity they advertise and market themselves together. All three entities form one complex that is connected by skywalks and includes a total of 116,700 square feet (11,000 m^{2}) of space.

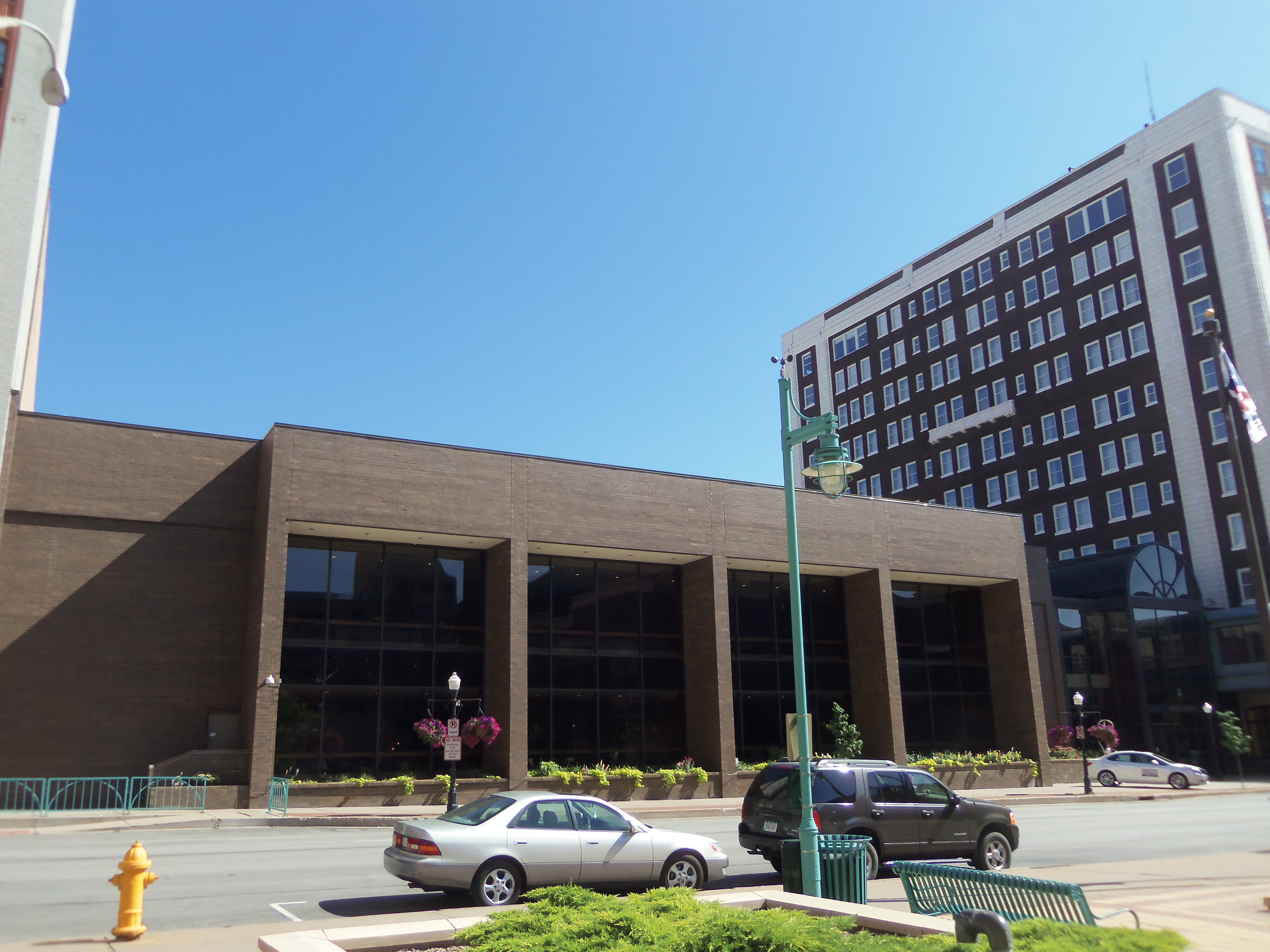
RiverCenter's north building

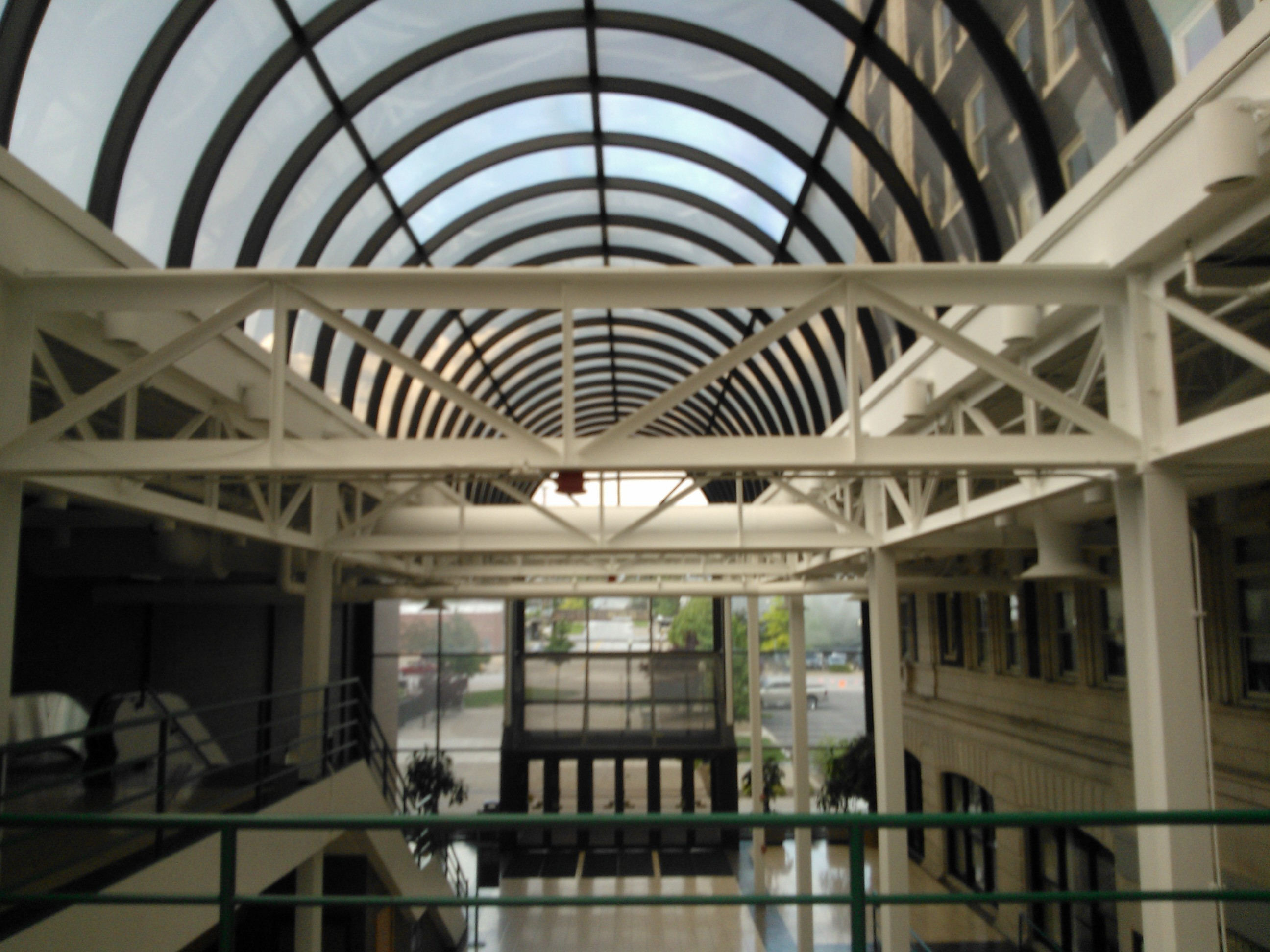
North building atrium

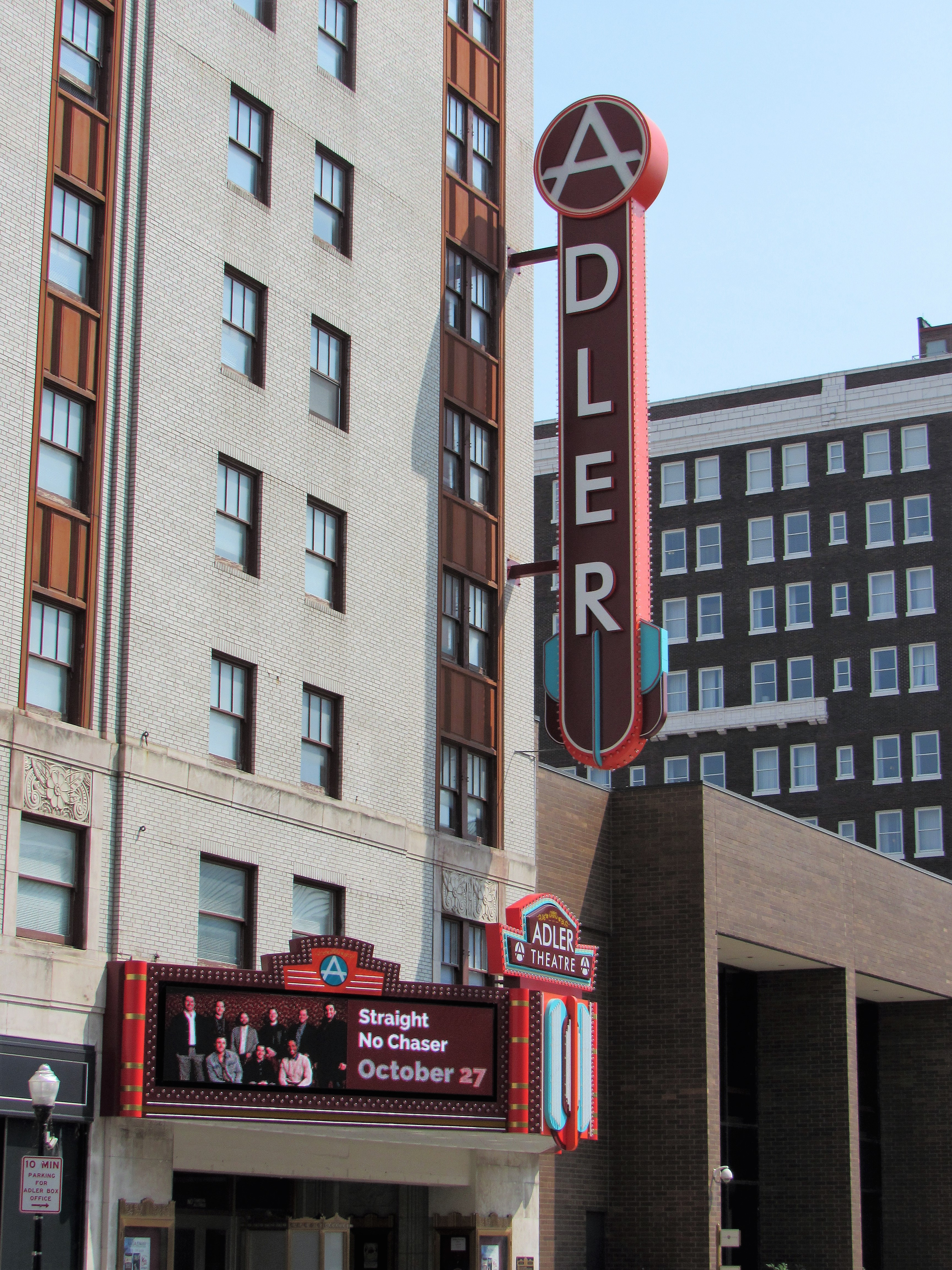
Adler Theatre marquee

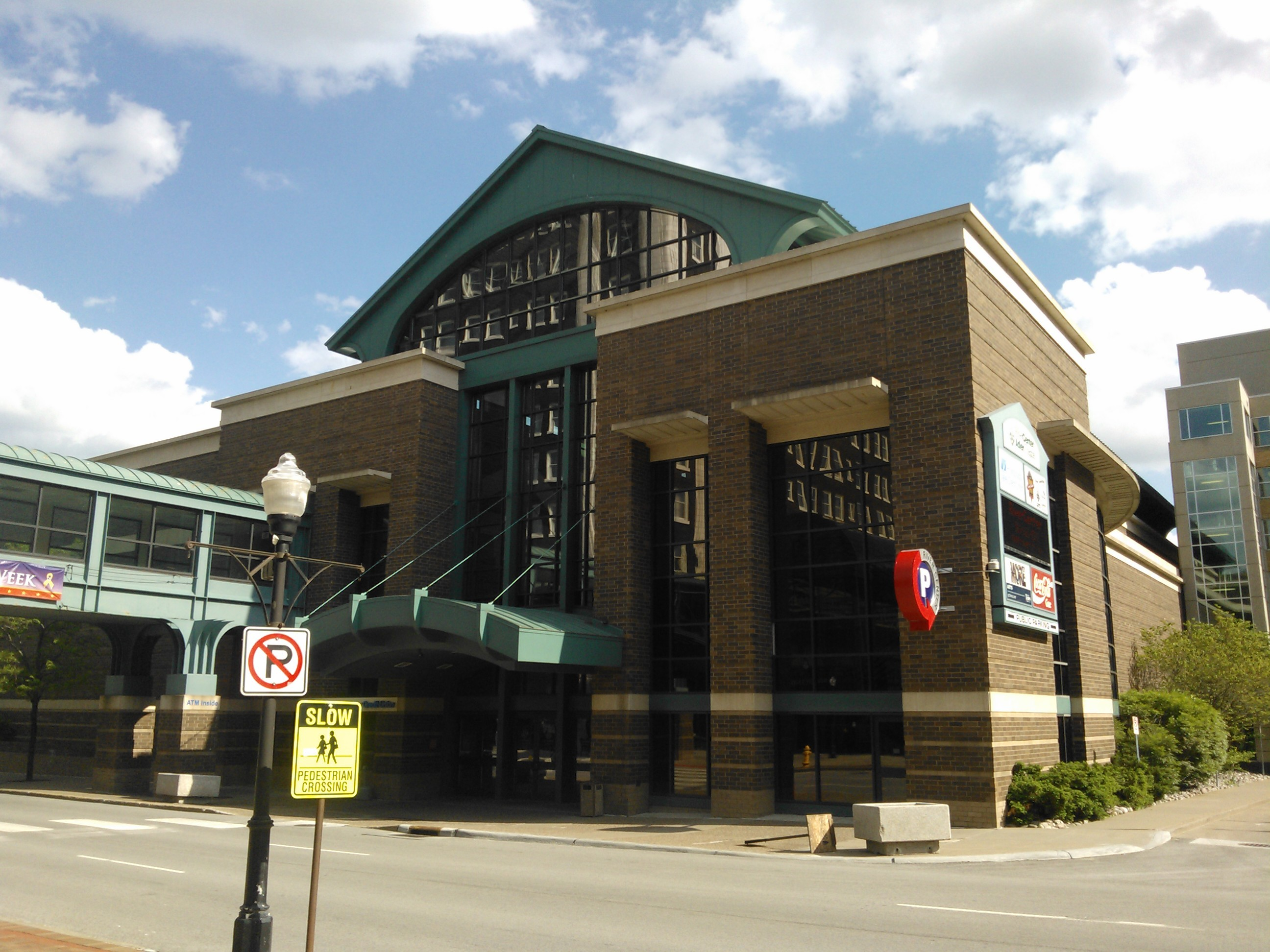
RiverCenter's south building from E. 3rd St.

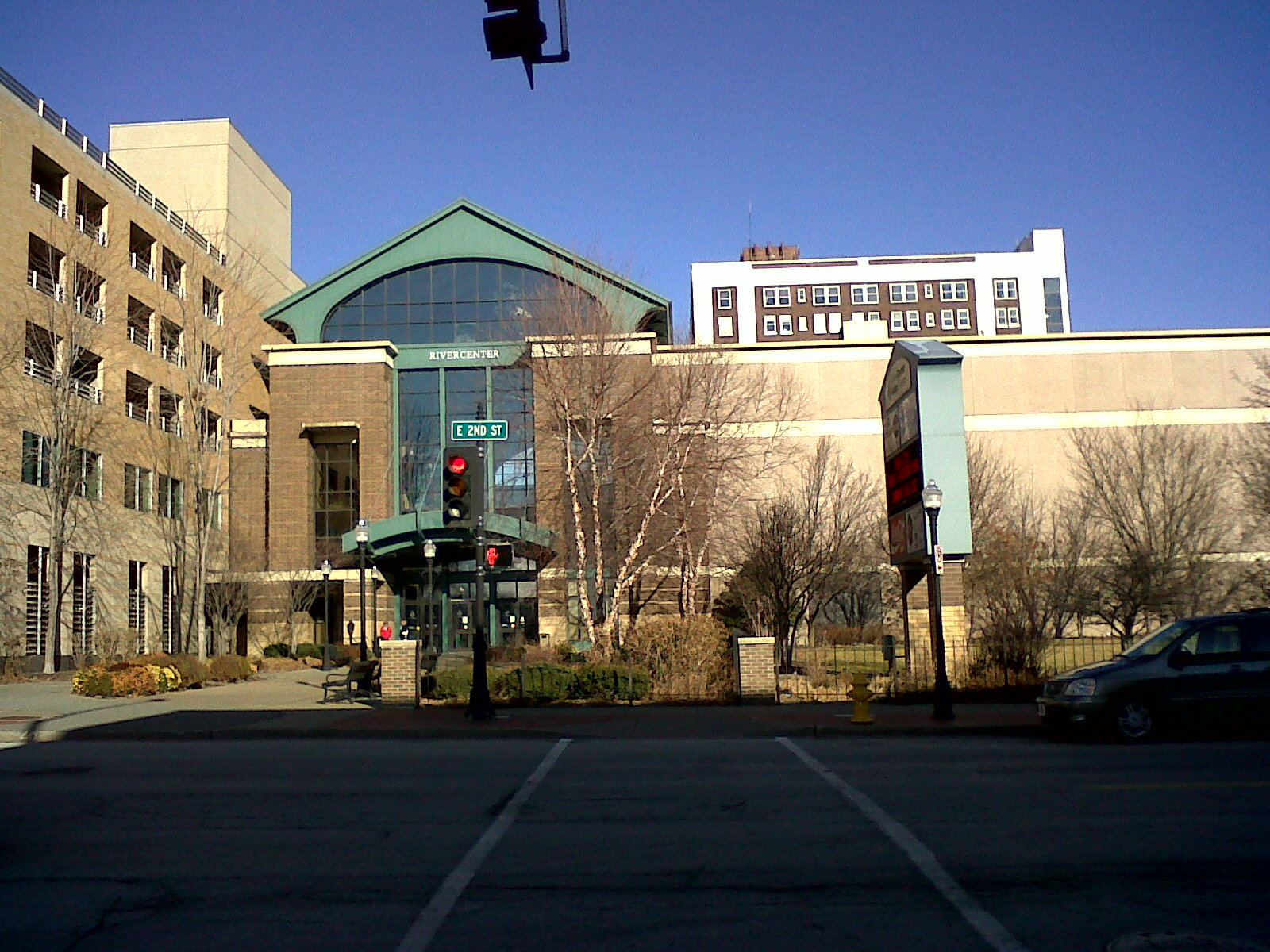
RiverCenter's south building from E. 2nd St.

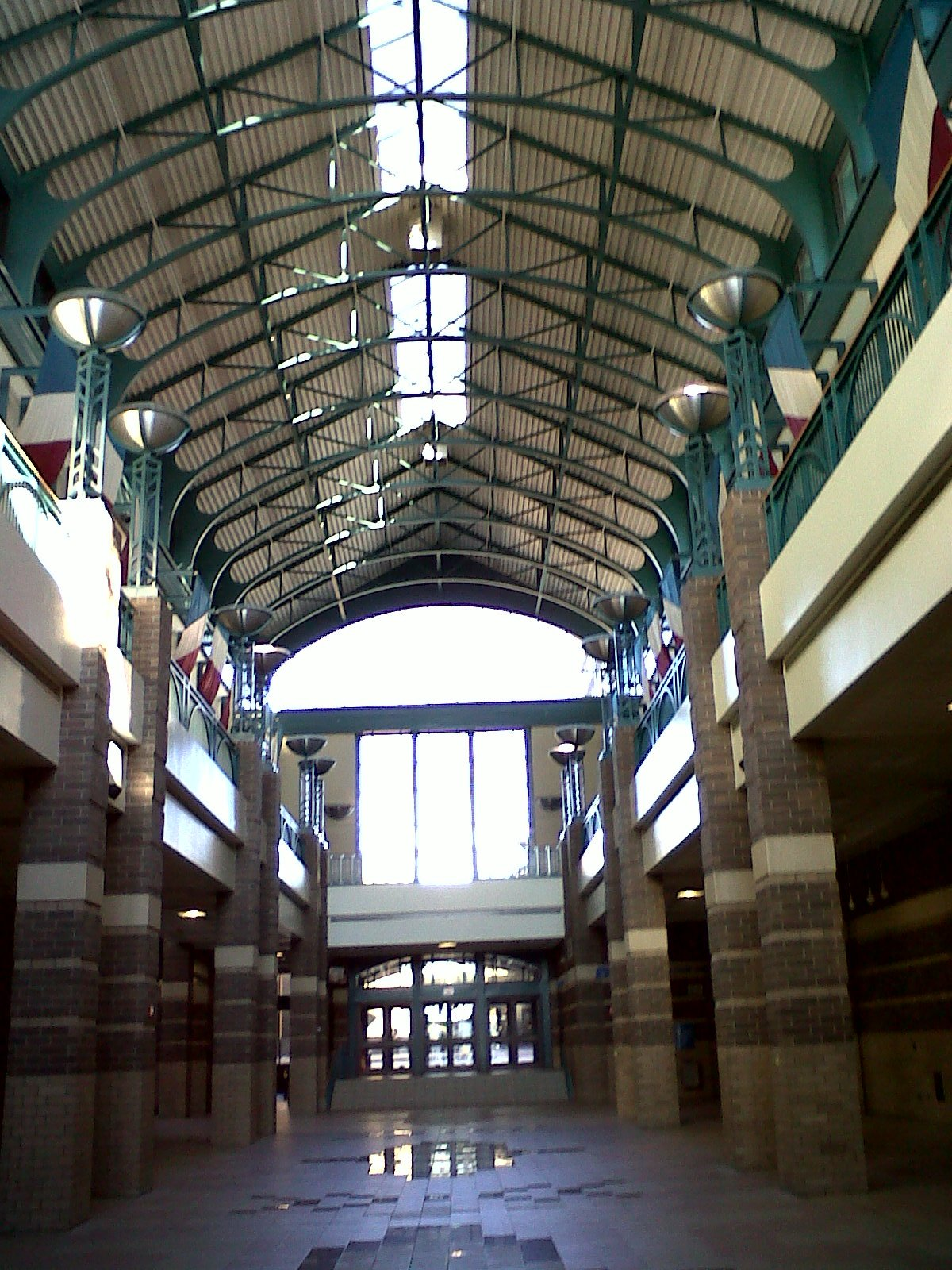
South building atrium

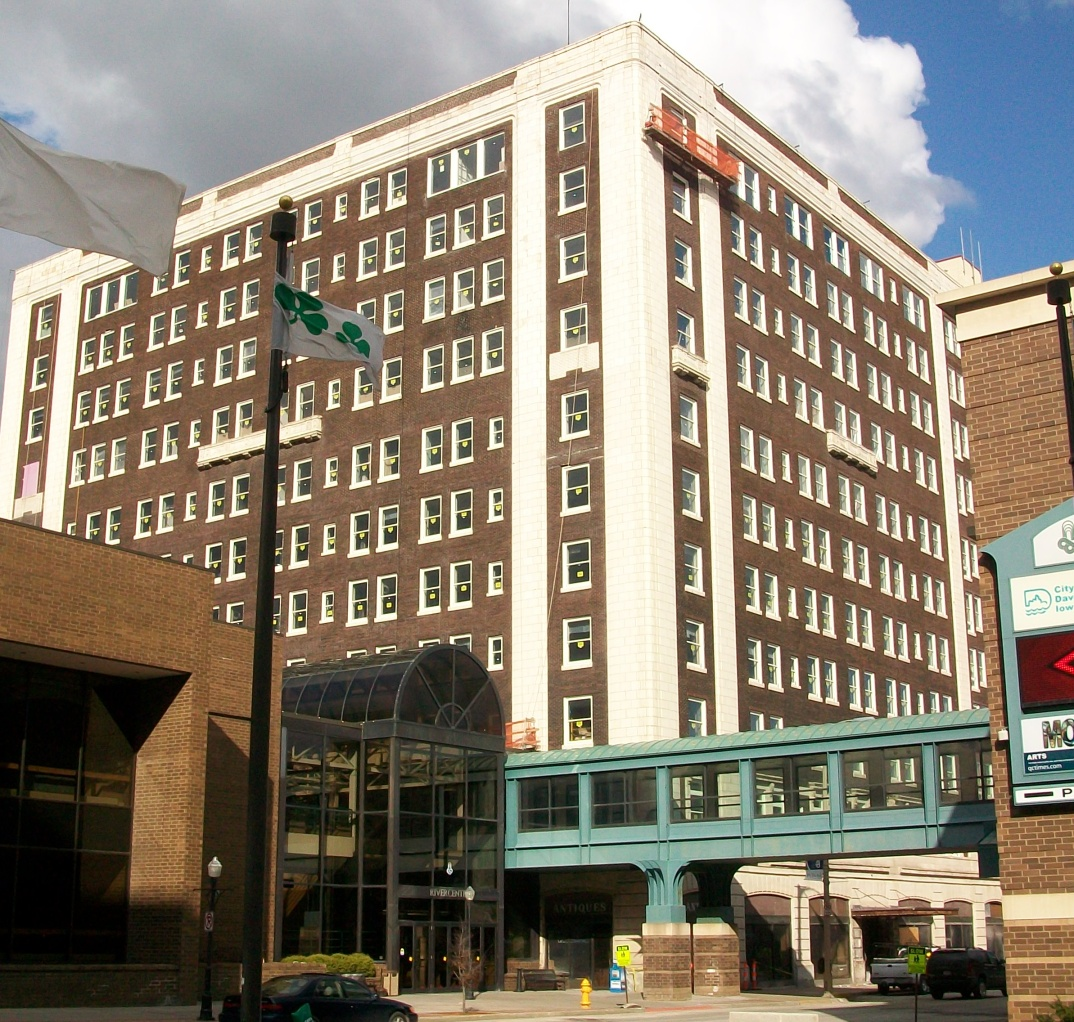
Hotel Blackhawk
