= New York Court of Chancery =

1701–1847 state court

The New York Court of Chancery was the highest Court of equity in the Province, and later State, of New York from 1683 to 1847.

== History ==
The New York Court of Chancery was established during the British colonial administration on August 28, 1701, with the colonial governor acting as Chancellor. John Nanfan, the acting governor at the time, was therefore the first Chancellor. After the declaration of independence by the colonies during the American Revolutionary War, the newly established independent government created the New York State Constitution of 1777, which continued the court but required a lawyer to be appointed Chancellor. It was the court with jurisdiction on cases of equity in the state of New York from 1777 to 1847. It served also as a court of appeal which reexamined cases decided by the New York Supreme Court.

The Chancellor of New York, during the existence of the post, was the highest judicial officer in the state. From 1777 to 1822, he was an ex officio member of the Council of Revision. The Chancellor was also an ex officio member of the Court for the Trial of Impeachments and Correction of Errors in which his decisions could be appealed.

=== 1847 abolition ===
The Court of Chancery was abolished by the New York State Constitutional Convention of 1846, which reorganized the New York state judicial system. This became effective on July 5, 1847, when its equity jurisdiction was transferred to the New York Supreme Court and its appellate jurisdiction was transferred to the New York Court of Appeals. The Chief Judge of the Court of Appeals succeeded the Chancellor as the head of the state's judicial system.

== List of Chancellors of New York since 1777 ==
The following were the Chancellors of the State Court of Chancery:

No.	Image	Name	Term	Ref.
1		Robert R. Livingston	1777–1801	
2		John Lansing Jr.	1801–1814	
3		James Kent	1814–1823	
4		Nathan Sanford	1823–1826	
5		Samuel Jones	1826–1828	
6		Reuben H. Walworth	1828–1847	

== See also ==
- Michigan Court of Chancery
- Delaware Court of Chancery
- Bartleby, the Scrivener
