= Paramount Theatre (Cedar Rapids, Iowa) =

- Paramount Theater Building
- U.S. National Register of Historic Places
- U.S. Historic district – Contributing property
- The Paramount Theatre marquee in Cedar Rapids

- Location within Iowa Location within the United States
- Location: 123 3rd Ave SE, Cedar Rapids, Iowa
- Coordinates: 41°58′35.6″N 91°40′1.5″W
- Area: less than one acre
- Built: 1928
- Architect: Peacock and Frank
- Part of: Cedar Rapids Central Business District Commercial Historic District (ID15000757)
- NRHP reference No.: 76000778
- Added to NRHP: August 26, 1976

The Paramount Theatre is a 1,693-seat theater in Cedar Rapids, Iowa. It was individually listed on the National Register of Historic Places in 1976. In 2015 it was included as a contributing property in the Cedar Rapids Central Business District Commercial Historic District.

The theater is a restored example of a vaudeville/movie palace of the 1920s. It was damaged by the flood of June 2008, which submerged most of downtown Cedar Rapids.

The Paramount serves as home to Orchestra Iowa, the Cedar Rapids Area Theater Organ Society, and a series of Community Concerts. It is famous for its restored Wurlitzer theater organ, which could be lifted up from below stage level when used. The Paramount is included in the National Register of Historic Places.

== Early history ==
The Paramount first opened on September 1, 1928, and was at the time called the Capitol Theater. For its first year, it presented a full range of comedians, singers, dancers, acrobats, movies, and audience sing-alongs; its "Mighty Wurlitzer" organ was central to much of the entertainment it provided.

In 1929 it was purchased by Paramount Pictures, and given its current name.

The theater's architectural ideal was palatial, with a "Hall of Mirrors" patterned after that in Versailles and expensive oil paintings, busts, furniture and other treasures. Most of this was removed in the 1950s.

== Restoration in 1970s ==
The theater's website says it was "gifted" to the city of Cedar Rapids in December 1975. A 15-member commission was formed to develop it, and decided that the theater should be restored to its original state. To fund the restoration, the committee undertook a fund drive that raised $400,000 (about $1.75 million in 2008 dollars) from businesses and individuals. No tax revenues were used.

== Renovation in 2000s ==
A second renovation fund-drive was undertaken in 2001, raising $7.8 million (about $9.5 million in 2008 dollars). A key funding source was a State of Iowa culture and tourism grant. The renovation took place in 2003 and added a 57' wing space, a reception hall, and much-improved HVAC system and electrical and fire system. It also repaired or replaced seat covers, restrooms, and carpeting. After the 2003 renovation, the main floor of the theater seated 1126 and the balcony seated 787. The theater kept an autograph book of all famous performers who had appeared on its stages.

== Flood of 2008 ==
The Paramount Theatre was damaged by the epic flood that began in the early morning of Wednesday, June 11, 2008 when the Cedar River rose over its banks. When the record-breaking flood waters crested at 32 feet on Friday, June 13, 2008, most of downtown Cedar Rapids was covered in a toxic mix of garbage and river water, including the Paramount. Restoration of the Paramount Theatre was scheduled to be completed in the fall of 2012. The console, lift, and blower of the Mighty Wurlitzer theater organ were destroyed by the flood.

== See also ==
- Theatre Cedar Rapids
- Movie palaces list

== Sources ==
- Opera Houses of the Midwest, p. 34. Mid-America Theatre Conference:1988
- Jamie, Kelly (June 18, 2008). "Floodwaters Scar Downtown". The Gazette. Cedar Rapids, Iowa: Gazette Communications. pp. 1–2.
