= William A. Brodie =

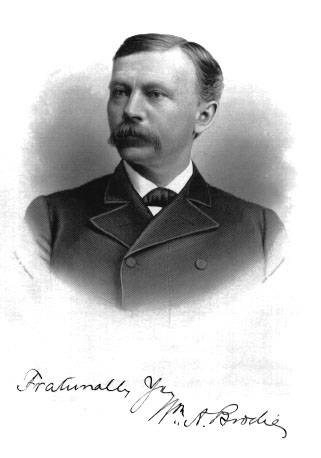

Grand Master of Masons of New York
- In office 1884–1884
- Preceded by: J. Edward Simmons
- Succeeded by: Frank R. Lawrence

Personal details
- Born: 1841 Kilbarchan, Scotland
- Died: 1917 (aged 75–76)

William A. Brodie (1841–1917) was a Scots-American businessman and Freemason. He was Grand Master of Masons in the state of New York in 1884 and in that capacity laid the foundation stone of the Statue of Liberty on August 5, 1884.

== Biography ==
Brodie was born in village of Kilbarchan, Scotland on August 9, 1841. When he was two years old his parents emigrated to America to begin a new life. They settled in the State of New York. William became a successful businessman. He died on May 9, 1917 .

== Activities ==
Brodie was the county treasurer of Livingston County for fifteen years.

Brodie was additionally the President of the Geneseo Gas Company and of the Geneseo Electric Company. He was an elder in the Presbyterian Church of Geneseo from 1868 until his death in 1917.

== Freemasonry and the Statue of Liberty ==
Brodie was a dedicated Mason:

Raised November 9, 1863, Genesee Lodge No. 214, (Geneseo, New York)
Junior Warden, 1867, Genesee Lodge No 214
Senior Warden, 1868, Genesee Lodge N0 214
Master, 1869-1871, 1875-1877, 1880, Genesee Lodge No 214
Knights Templar, 1873, Monroe Commandery No. 12
Scottish Rite 33 degree, Rochester Consistory
Sovereign Grand Inspector General; September 25, 1885
Royal Arch, 1867

Affiliated to Lodge St. Barchan No. 156, Grand Lodge of Scotland on July 20, 1888.

During his term as Grand Master of New York in 1884 he laid the foundation stone of the Statue of Liberty. When asked why the Freemasons would be asked to place the foundation stone he replied "No other organization has done more to promote liberty and to liberate men from the chains of ignorance and tyranny than Freemasonry."

== State University of New York ==
William Brodie was also influential in having the Geneseo College established in Geneseo, Livingston County, New York, which is now known as SUNY Geneseo. The Brodie Fine Arts building, which was named after William Brodie was constructed on the campus in 1967.

== See also ==
The William A. Brodie (1841-1917) Collection held by the Livingston County Historian's Office, in Mt. Morris, NY, contains original ledgers, correspondence, and photographs of the Brodie and Coddington families.
