= Archer Daniels Midland Wheat Mill =

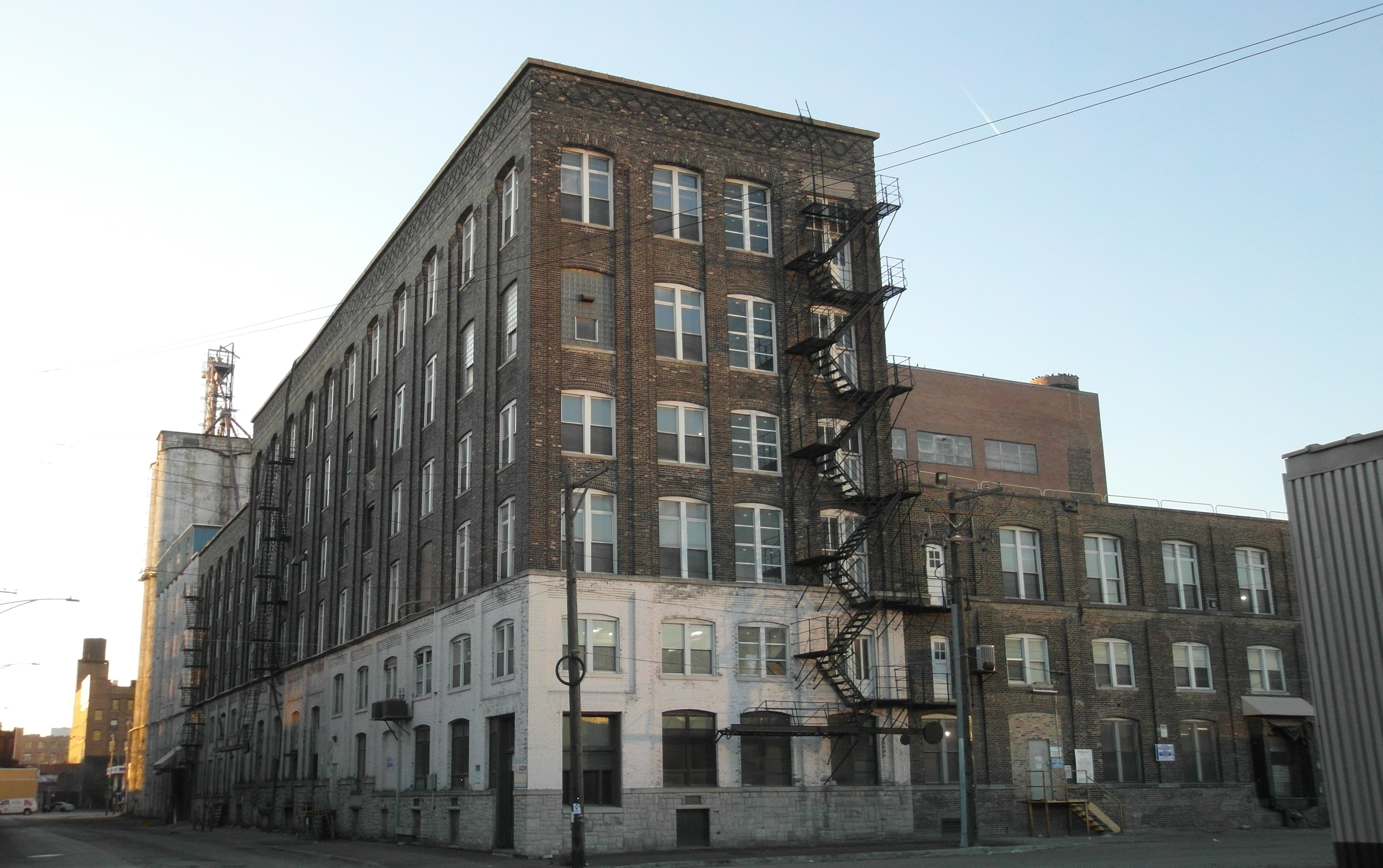
- Interactive map of the Archer Daniels Midland Wheat Mill area

General information
- Location: 1300 W. Carroll Avenue, Chicago, Illinois
- Coordinates: 41°53′16.8″N 87°39′35.1″W
- Completed: 1897–1948
- Demolished: 2021

Technical details
- Floor area: 250,000 sq ft (23,000 m^{2})

Design and construction
- Architects: William Carbys Zimmerman & John J. Flanders

The Archer Daniels Midland Wheat Mill was a plant in Chicago's Fulton Market District. The complex included brick loft buildings, a grain elevator, and silos. The oldest buildings in the complex were built in 1897 and were designed by William Carbys Zimmerman and John J. Flanders. It originally served as Eckhart & Swan's wheat and rye mill.

== History ==
In 1896, Eckhart & Swan purchased the Hess elevators, on Carroll Avenue, between Ada and Elizabeth street, for $75,000. In 1897, Eckhart & Swan began constructing a new wheat and rye mill, at a cost of between $250,000 and $300,000, replacing their existing mill at Canal and Fulton. It was the largest mill in Illinois. In 1909, Eckhart & Swan Milling Company's name was changed to the B. A. Eckhart Milling Company.

An addition was built at the corner of Carroll and Elizabeth in 1910. The grain elevator was built in 1927, and was designed by M. A. Lang. In 1927, Eckhart purchased an adjoining property on Elizabeth Street, to build an addition to their plant. The property had been the site of the Puritan Mills feed plant, which burned down the previous year. New grain silos were built by Bulley & Andrews in 1948.

In 1964, Dixie Portland Flour Mills purchased Eckhart Milling Company. In 1990, Archer Daniels Midland purchased the plant for $14 million. In 2017, Archer Daniels Midland announced that it intended to build a new plant in Mendota, Illinois and close their plant in Chicago. In 2018, the plant was sold to Sterling Bay for approximately $25 million. Sterling Bay began demolishing the mill on February 11, 2021. Initial reports stated that Sterling Bay planned to build a Metra station on the site. In February 2021, Preservation Chicago listed the complex as one of Chicago's most endangered buildings.

=== Fires ===
On March 26, 1912, a suction fan overheated and ignited waste in a wheat cleaning room, starting a fire. The fire was contained to the northern half of the four-story building, due to a worker closing a fireproof door. After the firefighters left, a dust explosion caused a partial structural collapse, killing one worker.

On March 18, 1970, an explosion occurred in a storage room on the sixth floor, killing one worker and injuring three, and causing the collapse of the top two floors of the northern edge of the building. Many of the bricks fell onto a freight car parked on tracks to the north of the building. Damage was estimated at $50,000.
