= Northeast Evanston Historic District =

Historic district in Illinois, United States

- U.S. National Register of Historic Places
- U.S. Historic district
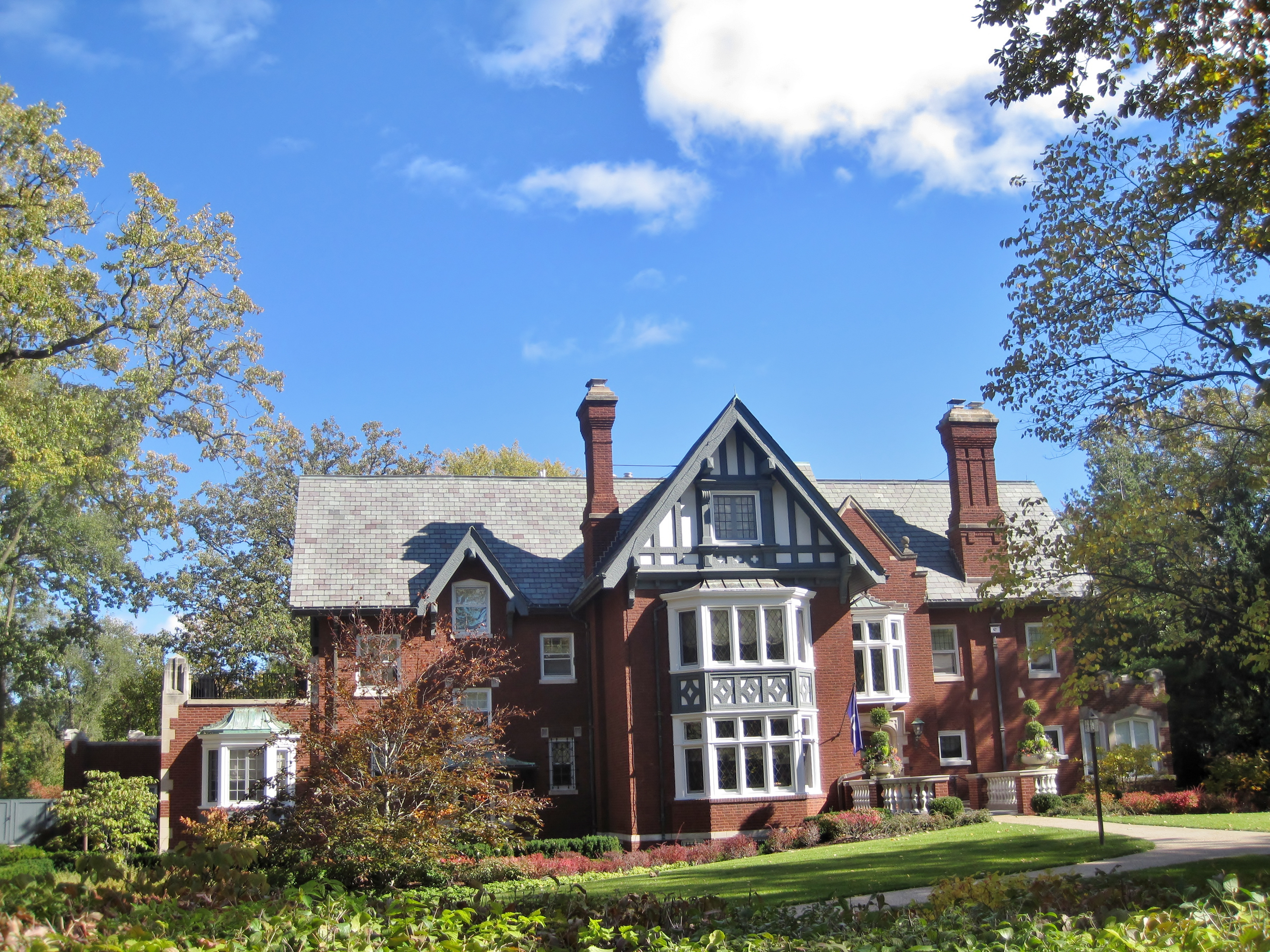

- Location within Chicago metropolitan area Location within Illinois Location within the United States
- Location: Roughly bounded by Emerson St., Sherman Ave., Sheridan Pl., Lake Michigan, Sheridan Rd., and Orrington Ave., Evanston, Illinois
- Coordinates: 42°03′40″N 87°40′47″W
- Area: 201 acres (81 ha)
- NRHP reference No.: 99000979
- Added to NRHP: August 12, 1999

The Northeast Evanston Historic District is a residential historic district in northeastern Evanston, Illinois. The district includes 474 contributing buildings in an area bounded by Sheridan Place to the north, Lake Michigan to the east, Emerson Street to the south, and Ridge Avenue and the CTA's Purple Line to the west. The area was developed later than central and southeast Evanston; while its oldest building dates from the 1860s, most of the homes in the district were built between 1890 and 1930. The district's houses are representative of the popular architectural styles of the period; the American Craftsman, Tudor Revival, and Colonial Revival styles are especially prevalent. Works by many prominent Chicago architects, including Holabird & Roche, Tallmadge & Watson, Howard Van Doren Shaw, George W. Maher, William Carbys Zimmerman, Solon Spencer Beman, and Schmidt, Garden and Martin, can be found in the district. Vernacular works with bungalow, American Foursquare, and gable front designs are also common in the district.

The district was added to the National Register of Historic Places on August 12, 1999.
