= Quad City Symphony Orchestra =

Quad City Symphony Orchestra (QCSO)
- Orchestra
- official logo
- Former name: Tri-City Symphony
- Founded: 1916
- Location: Davenport, Iowa
- Principal conductor: Mark Russell Smith
- Website: www.qcso.org

The Quad City Symphony Orchestra (QCSO) is a United States symphony orchestra based in Davenport, Iowa, and representing the Quad Cities area. The current music director and conductor is Mark Russell Smith. Established in 1916, the orchestra has a full season, performing six Masterworks series concerts, three pops concerts, and five signature series chamber concerts. The 96-member orchestra principally performs at two venues: the Adler Theater, located in Davenport, Iowa and Centennial Hall on the campus of Augustana College in Rock Island, Illinois. The Riverfront Pops Concert in early September is held at the W.D. Petersen Memorial Music Pavilion in LeClaire Park on the Davenport riverfront. Its Holiday Pops Concert is performed at the Adler Theater. The signature series concerts are held in a more intimate setting, often at the Figge Art Museum. It also maintains four ensembles for local youth and conducts extensive outreach in area schools.

== History ==
=== Tri-City Symphony Orchestra ===
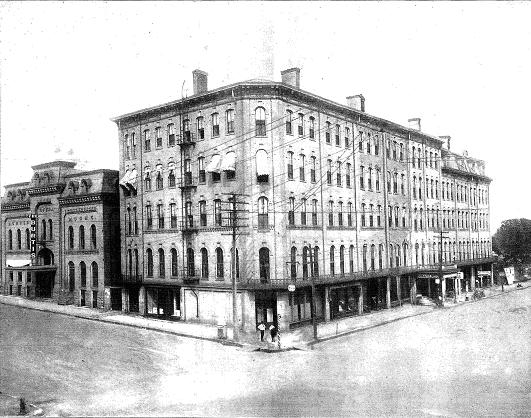
Burtis Opera House (on the left) hosted the first concerts.

The orchestra began at a meeting of musicians and citizens from Davenport, Rock Island and Moline on February 10, 1916. They hired Ludwig Becker of Chicago as the first music director. The first name for the orchestra was the Tri-City Symphony. The Tri-Cities, as the area was then called, was the smallest community in the United States to support a full symphony orchestra.

The first rehearsal for the orchestra was held on March 12, 1916, and its first concert was held on March 29. The orchestra was composed of 60 amateur and professional musicians from the Tri-Cities. The first performance was held before an audience of 1,200 people at the orchestra's first home, the Burtis Opera House, a vaudeville theater in Davenport. The program included: Wagner's Prelude to Die Meistersinger von Nürnberg; the Wagnerian aria Dich Theure Halle sung by contralto Esther Plumb; Franz Schubert's Symphony No. 8 (Unfinished); Camille Saint-Saëns’ Concerto for Piano and Orchestra, featuring pianist Robert MacDonald; and a few shorter pieces, including a string Orchestra elegy, a waltz, and Tchaikovsky's Marche Slav, The orchestra's first pops concert was held on May 6, 1917, at the Davenport Coliseum.

While the orchestra was popular among the citizens of the community, it struggled financially. At first, many of the musicians were not paid, although members of the local musicians union were paid a nominal fee. Because donations fluctuated the number of concerts the orchestra performed fluctuated. Some seasons the orchestra performed eight concerts and during other seasons they had as few as three. Because of the economy during World War I, the 1918–19 season was cancelled. The symphony struggled to set prices that would attract audiences while at the same time enable it to cover its costs. In some cases the prices were so low that sold-out programs lost money.

=== Great Depression ===
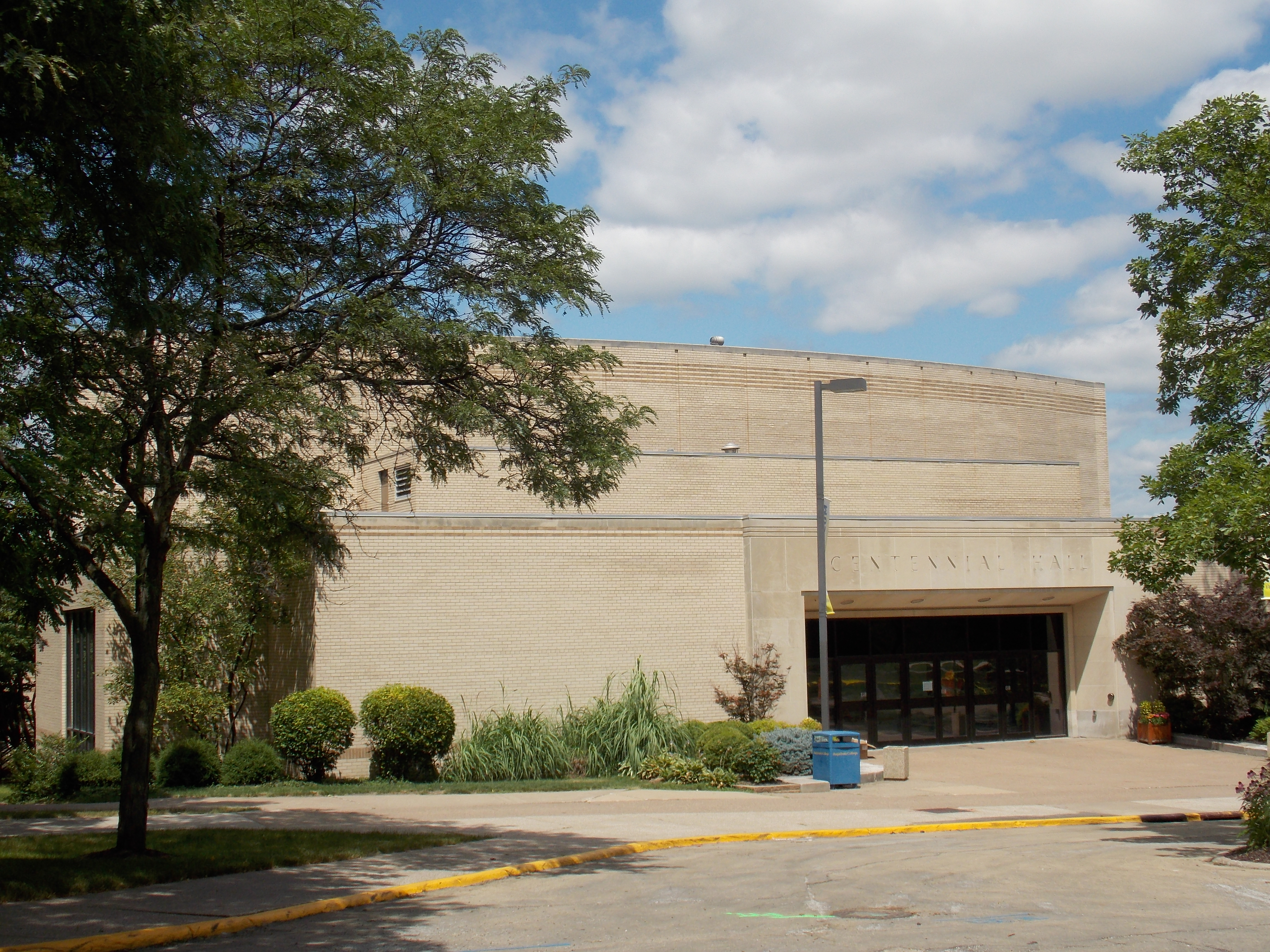
Centennial Hall

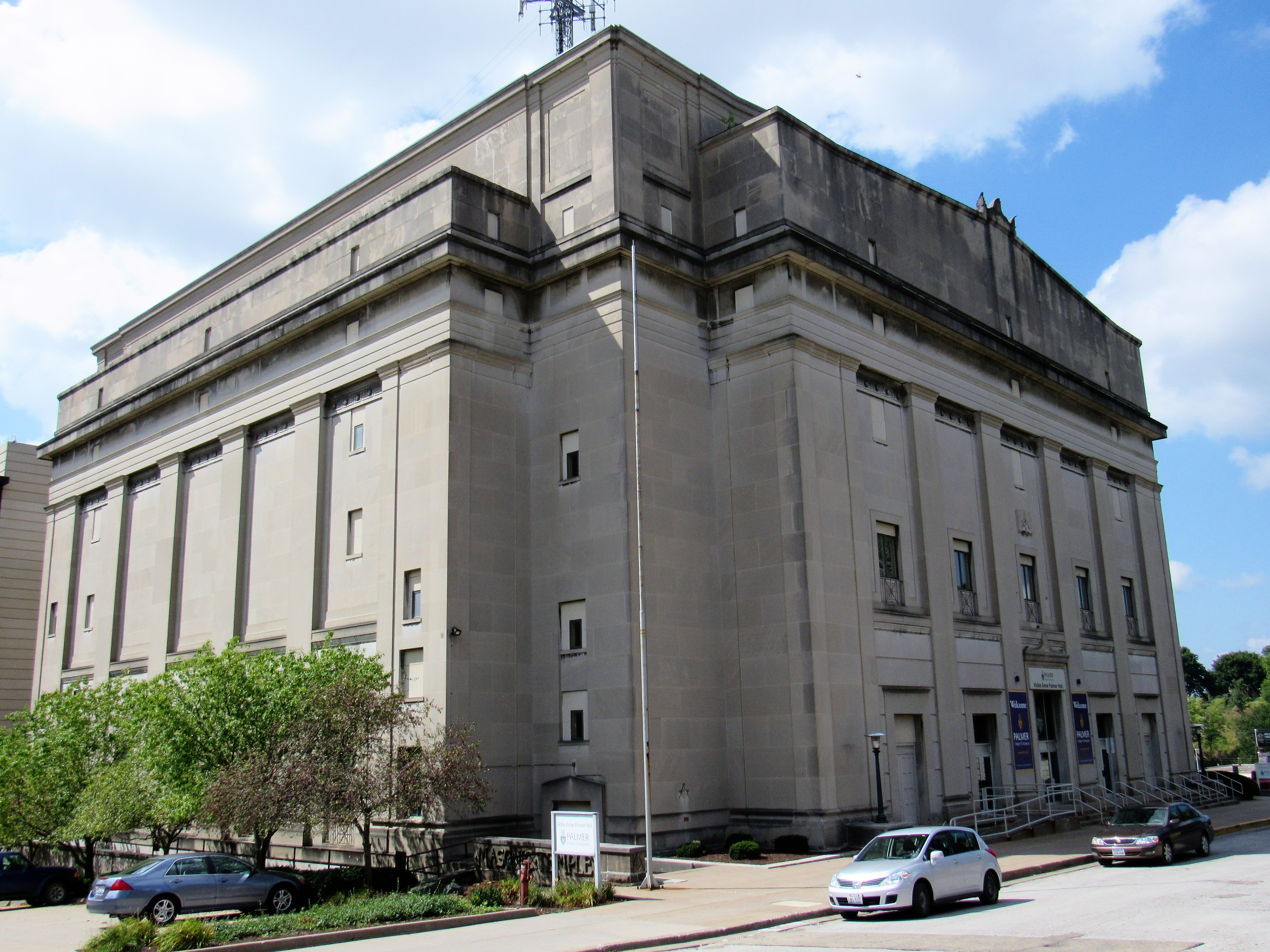
The former Masonic Temple in Davenport

The orchestra survived until the Great Depression. The musicians union insisted that their members receive payment, but the symphony could not afford to pay. By 1933 it was out of money. Most of the union musicians left the orchestra and were replaced by amateurs. Unable to perform its more traditional, complex programs, the orchestra offered free tickets for the 1933–34 season, except for a few seats that were sold for a quarter. Frank Kendrie, the new music director, was paid a $100 per concert.

In 1934 orchestra board member Elsie von Maur suggested they charge what the concerts were worth and return to hiring well-known guest artists. The changes worked. The orchestra started to make money, and was able to hire professional musicians again. The Junior Board was established in 1936 to sponsor fundraising projects. In 1940 Elsie von Maur became the symphony's first manager, a position she held for 47 years.

Von Maur began the practice of the orchestra's playing the "Star Spangled Banner" on December 7, 1941, at the concert after the Japanese bombed Pearl Harbor. The tradition of not applauding after the national anthem dates from that same concert, when the audience's stunned silence followed the anthem. During World War II, students filled the chairs of musicians who had joined the military. Unlike during the previous war, attendance at the concerts remained high, and the orchestra added concerts in 1944.

=== After World War II ===
The symphony made its national broadcast premiere with a live concert on NBC radio's Orchestras of the Nation on January 31, 1948. Later Augustana College's radio station (WVIK) started to broadcast the orchestra's masterworks concerts the week after the performance.

The symphony continued to grow in the 1950s. Concerts were moved to Centennial Hall at Augustana College. In the 1960s concerts were held at the Masonic Temple in Davenport as well. In 1976 they hired Lance Willett as the first executive director.

=== Quad City Symphony Orchestra ===
Former logo

In the 1980s, the orchestra relocated its performances to the Adler Theater, the former RKO Orpheum in Davenport, which was renovated. At the same time, the orchestra changed its name to the Quad City Symphony to better reflect the area. On October 10, 1996, the symphony premiered Lalo Schifrin's Rhapsody for Bix, a tribute to Davenport native and jazz great Bix Beiderbecke. Schifrin conducted the orchestra.

On July 3, 2010, the symphony participated in the Quad Cities Independence Day celebration, "Red, White and Boom!", for the first time. They played a 60-minute pops concert in Davenport's LeClaire Park.

== Youth Ensembles ==
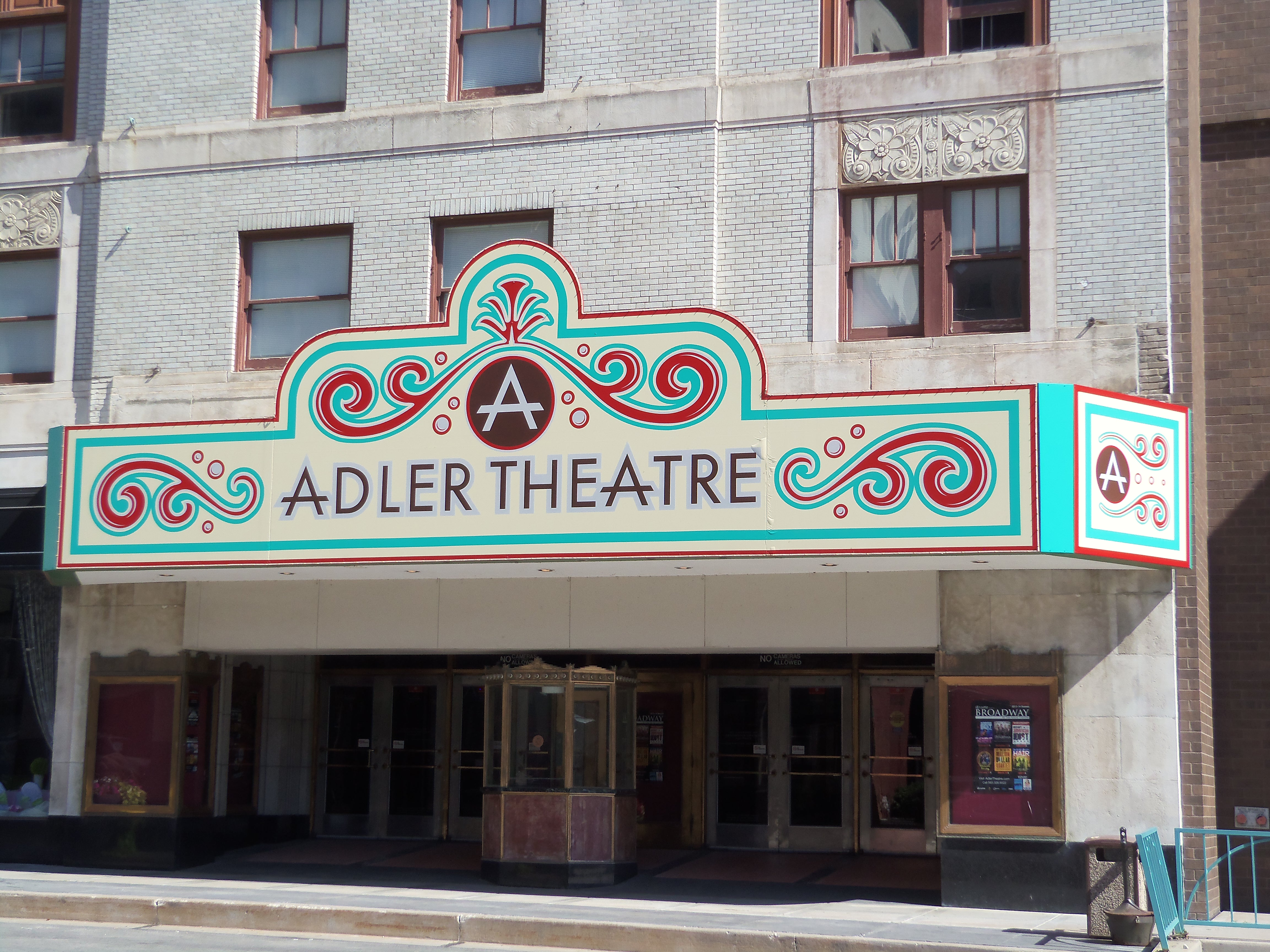
Adler Theatre

The is Quad City Youth Symphony Orchestra was founded in 1958 and is the premiere youth orchestra in the region that trains musicians in middle, junior high and high schools. It is open to musicians from 22 school districts. Around 90 musicians perform concerts in the autumn, winter, and spring. The Youth Philharmonic Orchestra is another Youth Ensemble Group and is an intermediate full orchestra in which members can gain experience playing with other instrument groups.

Other groups in the Quad City Youth Ensembles include the Concert Orchestra for string and wind players who are not ready to play the full orchestral repertoire of the symphony, and the Prelude Strings an introductory group for students playing the violin, viola cello, or bass. All ensembles perform at annual Fall and Winter Concerts along with the Quad City Symphony Orchestra during the Side-By-Side Concert.

== Volunteers for Symphony ==
In 1936 the Junior Board was begun to sponsor fundraising projects for the symphony. In 1957 the Tri-City Symphony Auxiliary was formed as another support for it. The group was renamed the Guild of the Quad City Symphony Orchestra after the change of names.

Both organizations merged to form Volunteers for Symphony in 1996. They organize fundraisers such as the Derby Day Party in May and the Second Fiddle Sale in June to support the symphony's music education programs. These programs are provided at no cost to students or schools.

== Music directors ==
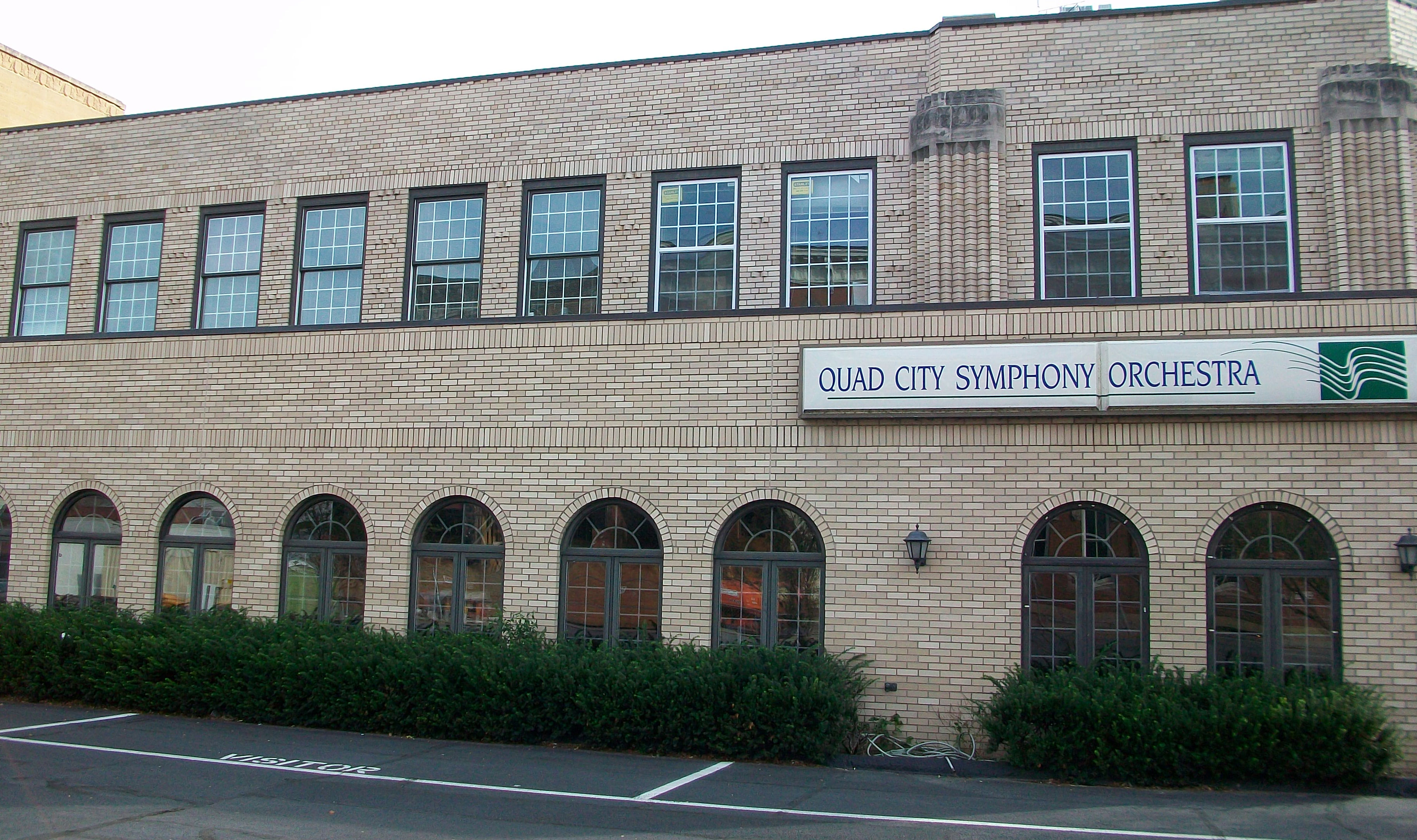
QCSO offices in downtown Davenport

- 1916–1933: Ludwig Becker
- 1933–1936: Frank Kendrie
- 1936–1937: Frank Laird Waller
- 1938–1949: Oscar Anderson
- 1949–1954: Harry John Brown
- 1954–1956: Piero Bellugi
- 1956–1965: Charles Gigante
- 1965–1994: James Dixon
- 1995–1997: Kim Allen Kluge
- 1999–2007: Donald Schleicher
- 2008–present: Mark Russell Smith

== Guest artists ==
The following is an incomplete list of guest artists who have appeared with the QCSO:

- Rose Bampton
- Leon Bates
- Joshua Bell
- Louie Bellson
- Suzy Bogguss
- Jorge Bolet
- Robert Casadesus
- Rudolf Firkusny
- Benny Goodman
- Midori Gotō
- Jascha Heifetz
- Marilyn Horne
- Byron Janis
- Jennifer Koh
- Stephen Kovacevich
- Mario Lanza
- Heidi Melton
- Robert Merrill
- Sherrill Milnes
- Nathan Milstein
- James Morrison
- Garrick Ohlsson
- Itzhak Perlman
- Roberta Peters
- Philippe Quint
- Margherita Roberti
- Lalo Schifrin
- Nadja Salerno-Sonnenberg
- Richard Tucker
- André Watts
- Yo-Yo Ma
- Debby Boone
