= Berger Park =

Park in Chicago, Illinois

- U.S. National Register of Historic Places
- U.S. Historic district
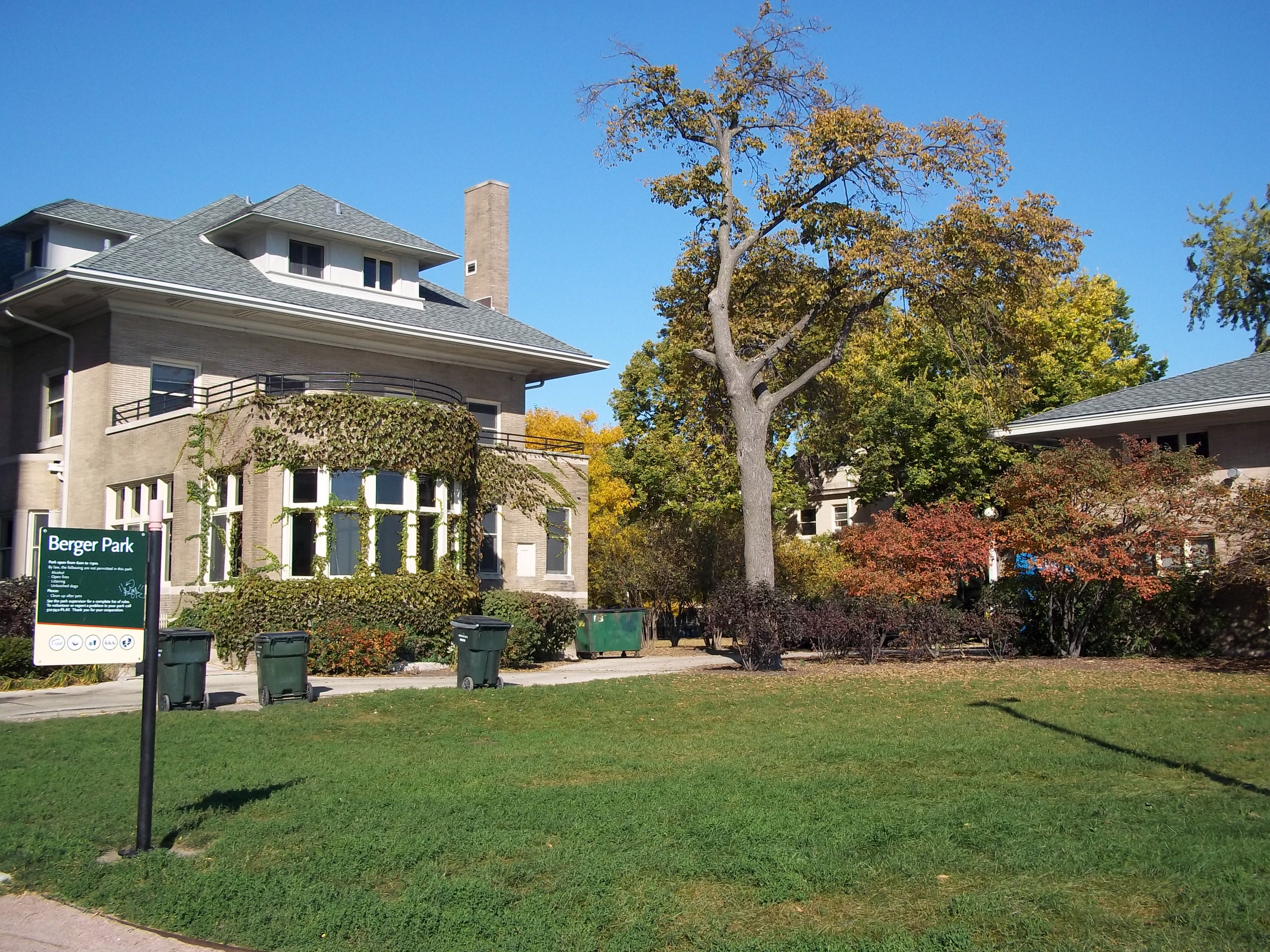

- Location within Chicago metropolitan area
- Location: 6205-47 N. Sheridan Road, Chicago, Illinois
- Coordinates: 41°59′43″N 87°39′18″W
- Area: 3.34 acres (1.35 ha)
- Built: 1906
- Architects: William Carbys Zimmerman (Downey), Myron H. Church (Gunder)
- Architectural style: Late 19th And Early 20th Century American Movements, American Four Square
- Website: Berger Albert Park
- MPS: Chicago Park District MPS
- NRHP reference No.: 09001225
- Added to NRHP: January 12, 2010

Berger Park, officially Park #1255 of the Chicago Park District, is a small (3.34-acre (1.35 ha)) recreational area bordering Lake Michigan in the Edgewater neighborhood of North Side, Chicago, Illinois. The park includes the historic Downey and Samuel H. Gunder houses.

== History ==
Edgewater was a suburb of Chicago, relatively rural until John Lewis Cochran developed land for lakefront homes in 1885. Four years later, the town was annexed by Chicago. Cochran prohibited the construction of apartment buildings along Sheridan Road, and this plan was continued until the 1940s. The two houses in Berger Park were part of Cochran's Second Addition to Edgewater.

=== Downey House ===
The Downey House, now known as the South Mansion, was built for Joseph Downey. Downey was an Irish immigrant who was a partner in a contracting firm. He became a prominent businessman, serving as the chairman of the Buildings and Grounds Commission, on behalf of the Chicago Board of Education, and as a member of the Chicago Association of Commerce. During George Bell Swift's mayorship from 1895 to 1897, Downey was the Commissioner of Buildings and of Public Works. Swift's successor, Carter Harrison, Jr., named him to the Board of Education. He married Lena Kleine in 1885 and the pair commissioned William Carbys Zimmerman to design a house in 1906 for $20,000. Downey retired in 1911, and by 1920, they had left the house.

=== Gunder House ===
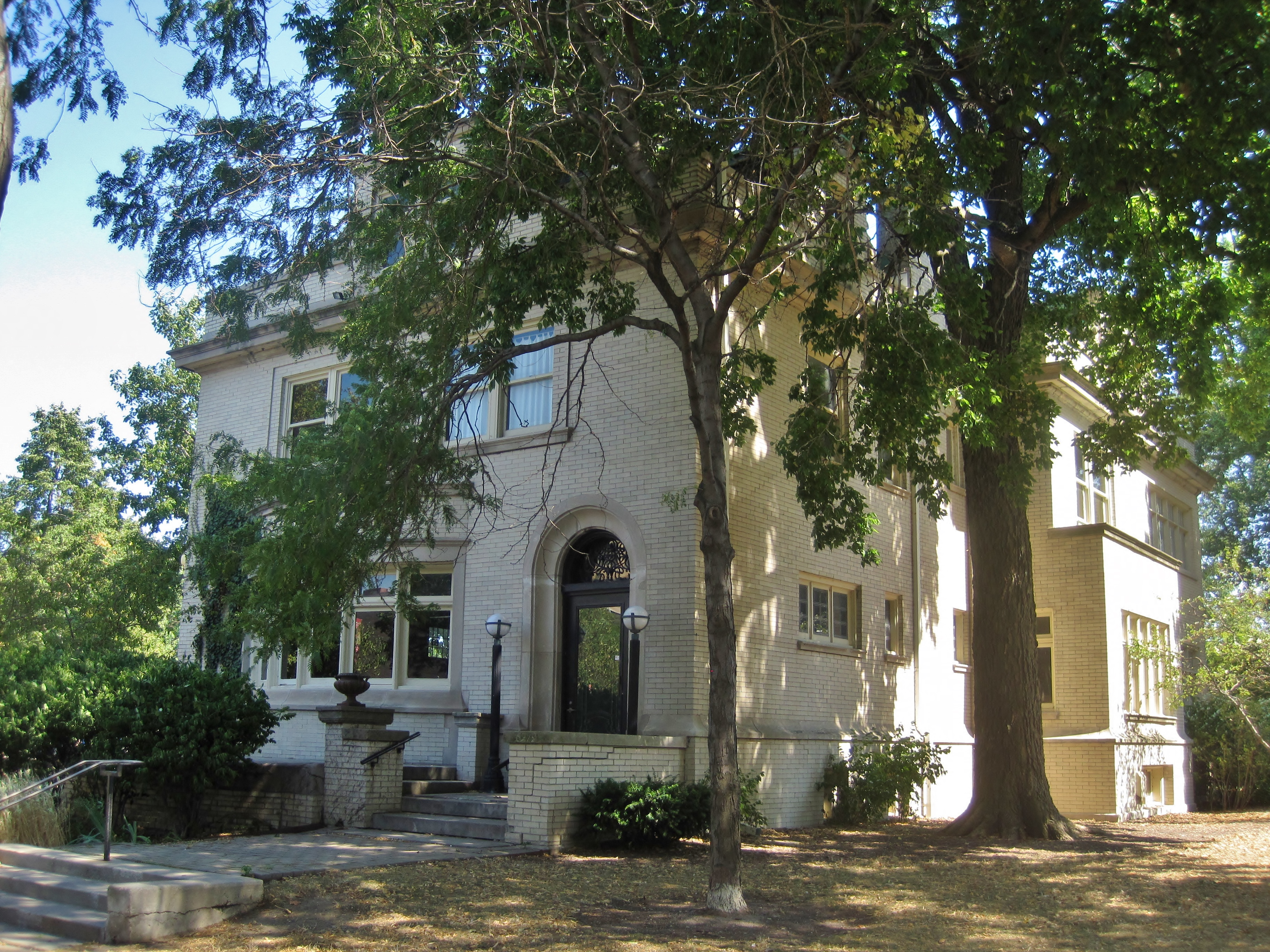
Samuel Gunder house

The Gunder House, officially the North Lakeside Cultural Center, was built for Samuel Gunder. Gunder was the president of the Pozzinni Pharmaceutical Company. He married Nettie E. Weaver in 1884 and commissioned this building in 1909. Myron Henry Church designed the house, which was completed the following year. The Gunders sold the house in 1919 and moved to Los Angeles, California.

During the Great Depression, the Chicago Bureau of Parks and Recreation sought to add beachfront land on the north side of the city. Edgewater residents were interested in beach activities, but lived too far from Lincoln Park. The bureau acquired the properties and named it Granville Beach and Park after nearby Granville Avenue. Residents still lived in the two houses until the Viatorian Fathers acquired them in the 1940s.

The Clerics of St. Viator used the buildings to house student priests. In 1945, they converted the two coach houses into additional residences. The order sold the rights to the beachfront land to the Chicago Park District in 1965 and moved out in 1979. The park district built a small playground along Granville Avenue in 1976. When the clerics moved out in 1979, developers sought to purchase the houses and demolish them for high-rise apartments, which now dominated the Edgewater lakefront. The Edgewater Community Council opposed this type of sale and convinced the park district to purchase the houses. The clerics agreed on the condition that the buildings be used for non-profit purposes. The sale was completed for $2.3 million, far less than the $6 million developers offered.

Following the acquisition, the park was renamed Berger park after Albert E. Berger, a proponent of the bureau's plan to acquire beachfront property. In 1982, the park district determined that the Gunder House was dilapidated beyond repair. The district agreed to delay demolition to give local residents to opportunity to raise funds for its rehabilitation. By 1987, enough money had been raised to save the structure, thanks in large part to a $216,000 contribution from the Community Development Block Grant. Ronald Berger, the son of Albert, made a matching donation.

The grounds were recognized by the National Park Service with a listing on the National Register of Historic Places on January 12, 2010.

== Present day ==
Faced with an eroding shoreline, the park district commissioned the Army Corps of Engineers to design an embankment along the shoreline. Although this caused the loss of the remaining beach, it preserved the remaining parkland. The small playground was removed and a new 8,000-square-foot (740 m^{2}) playground was built on the north side of the Gunder House.

The Downey House is now called the South Mansion and functions as a recreational facility for the park. The Gunder house was converted to the North Lakeside Cultural Center, offering workshops and classes. Its coach house is now a café.
