= Bernard A. Eckhart =

American politician

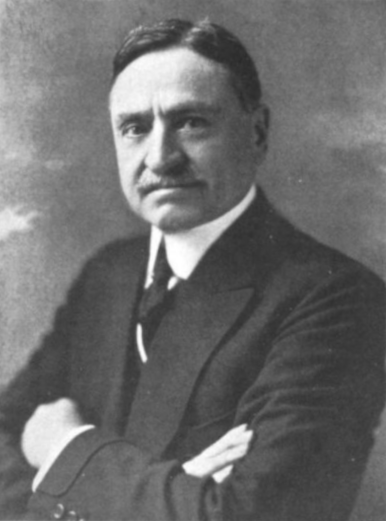

Member of the Illinois Senate from the 1st district
- In office 1886 – 1890
- Preceded by: George E. White
- Succeeded by: Edward Thomas Noonan

Personal details
- Born: September 4, 1848 Alsace, France
- Died: May 11, 1931 (aged 82) Chicago, Illinois, US
- Resting place: Rosehill Cemetery
- Party: Republican
- Profession: Miller

Bernard Albert Eckhart (September 4, 1848 – May 11, 1931) was a French-American miller, merchant, and politician. Raised in Milwaukee, Wisconsin, Eckhart learned the miller's trade there as a representative for the Eagle Milling Company. He co-founded his own company in 1874 and saw it prosper. Eckhart was elected to two two-year terms in the Illinois Senate in the 1880s and was director of the Chicago Board of Trade for three years. Later in his career he was president of the Sanitary District of Chicago and an aide-de-camp to Governor Charles S. Deneen.

== Biography ==
Bernard Albert Eckhart was born in Alsace, France on September 4, 1848. He came with his family to the United States when he was 6 years old, and with his family, settled in Schleisingerville, Wisconsin. They later sought farmland, buying up a plat in Vernon County, WI, near DeSoto. He left his brothers on the farm and graduated from a college in Milwaukee in 1868. Two years later he took a position as the Chicago, Illinois representative of the Eagle Milling Company. In 1874, he married Katie L. Johnston. They had four children: Carlos K., Percy B., Hazel, and Dorothy. He then left Eagle to co-found Eckhart & Swan, where he served as company president. The company was later renamed the B. A. Eckhart Milling Company.

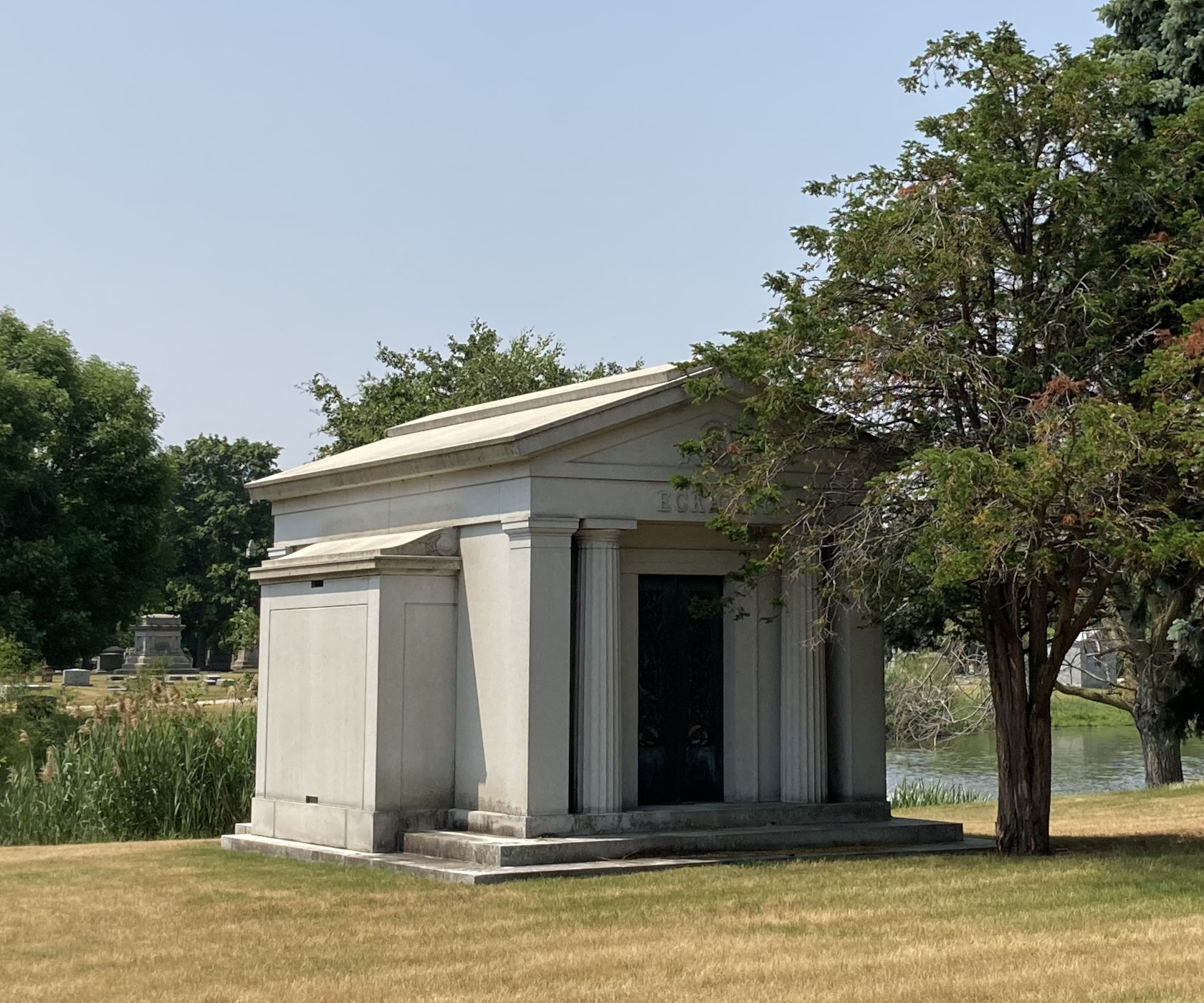
Eckhart mausoleum at Rosehill Cemetery

In 1886, Eckhart was elected to the Illinois Senate as a Republican, where he served two consecutive two-year terms. Eckhart served on the board of five banks: The Continental & Commercial National Bank, the Continental & Commercial Trust & Savings Bank, the Harris Trust & Savings Bank, the Chicago Title & Trust Company, and the Northwestern Trust & Savings Bank.. He was named director of the Chicago Board of Trade, serving from 1888 to 1891. Afterward, he served as a trustee of the Sanitary District of Chicago until 1900, serving at times as its president. He created this district as a senator and was instrumental in overseeing the completion of the Chicago Sanitary and Ship Canal. Eckhart successfully petitioned United States Secretary of War Russell A. Alger to allow the project to draw waters from Lake Michigan.

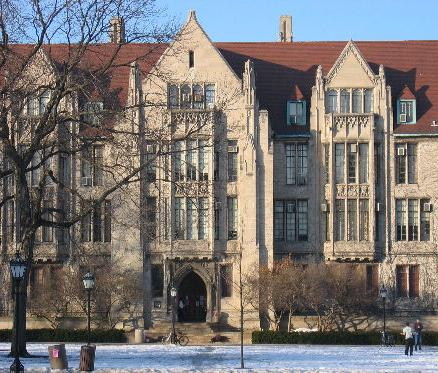
Eckhart Hall at the University of Chicago, named in his honor

Eckhart presided over the Millers' National Federation from 1902 until 1904 and served as president of the Illinois Manufacturers' Association in 1903. He was president of the West Chicago Board of Park Commissioners from 1905 to 1908; Eckhart Park is named after him. William Carbys Zimmerman designed Eckhart's estate, "Pinewold", in Lake Forest, Illinois in 1908. He served as an officer in the 1st Regiment Illinois National Guard, a company he co-founded. He was named a colonel (aide-de-camp) to Governor of Illinois Charles S. Deneen from 1906 to 1913. Eckhart also served as a trustee of the Lewis Institute. Eckhart donated a large sum of money to the University of Chicago to fund a new mathematics building, Eckhart Hall, completed in 1930. Eckhart died at his home in Chicago on May 11, 1931, and was buried in Rosehill Cemetery.
