= The Davenport (Davenport, Iowa) =

- Davenport Hotel
- U.S. National Register of Historic Places
- U.S. Historic district – Contributing property
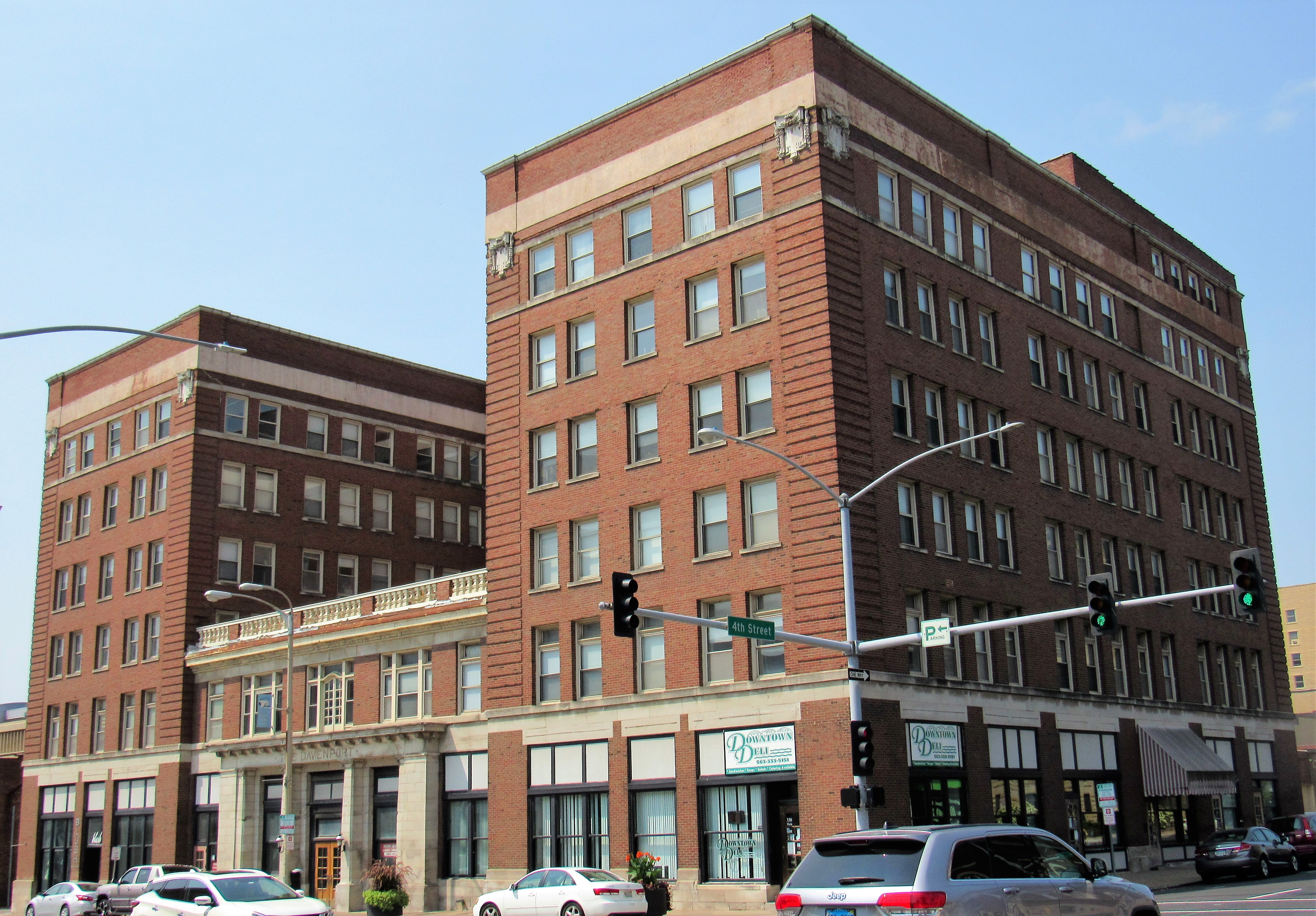
- The Davenport pictured in 2018

- Location within Iowa Location within the United States
- Location: 324 Main St. Davenport, Iowa
- Coordinates: 41°31′24″N 90°34′33″W
- Area: 1 acre (0.40 ha)
- Built: 1907
- Architect: P.T. Burrows; Temple & Burrows
- Architectural style: Renaissance Revival
- Demolished: 2023
- Part of: Davenport Downtown Commercial Historic District (ID100005546)
- MPS: Davenport MRA
- NRHP reference No.: 83002419

The Davenport Hotel was a historic building located in downtown Davenport, Iowa, United States. It was individually listed on the National Register of Historic Places in 1983. In 2020 it was included as a contributing property in the Davenport Downtown Commercial Historic District.

Sometime in the late 20th century, the hotel was converted into an apartment building called The Davenport. A rear portion of the building collapsed in 2023, resulting in the deaths of three people. The majority of the building was demolished on June 12, 2023, while the remaining sections were demolished over the next three days.

== History ==
Stockholders incorporated the Davenport Hotel Company in 1905 to construct a modern hotel that was roughly equidistant from the city's two passenger depots. The construction of the Davenport Hotel in 1907 ushered in the third phase of hotel construction in the city of Davenport. It replaced the Kimball House as Davenport's finest hotel. The other hotels that belong to this era are the Dempsey Hotel (1913), the Hotel Blackhawk (1915) and the Hotel Mississippi (1931). It was considered the first "modern" hotel in the city, and was touted as one of the finest hotels in the Mississippi River Valley when it opened. The hotel featured such amenities as "fireproof" construction, elevators, a dining room, and sample rooms for traveling salesmen. The building's interior also featured "steam heat, hot and cold water, telephones and electric lights, heavy brass bedsteads with box springs and hair mattresses, velvet carpets and fancy window draperies, quartered oak and Flemish oak furniture, mahogany combination tables and writing desks and beveled mirrors." It was also the first of Davenport's "tall buildings."

The Davenport was built a block away from the new Rock Island Railroad station, making it convenient for travelers. However, it was undermined by the Dempsey Hotel, which was built next to the station and provided moderately priced rooms. The more elegant Hotel Blackhawk also resulted in a loss of business to the Davenport and the hotel was sold to the Blackhawk Hotel company in 1916. The hotel was damaged in a large fire in 1939.

The building remained a hotel into the 1960s, but it eventually became an apartment building. It was extensively renovated in the mid-1980s at a cost of $5.5 million.

It was badly damaged during the August 2020 Midwest derecho, which had resulted in some residents having to evacuate the building. It was acquired by the Davenport Hotel LLC in a 2021 deal worth about $4.2 million.

Compared to the front of the building on Main Street, its rear face, next to a parking lot, had a dilapidated appearance. Days before the collapse, a structural engineer noted that the rear's brick façade was deformed. Repair work started on May 25, but according to the Quad-City Times, part of the building was still "bulging out" by May 27. On the same day, the bulging was reported in a 911 call to the Scott Emergency Communications Center.

== Partial collapse ==
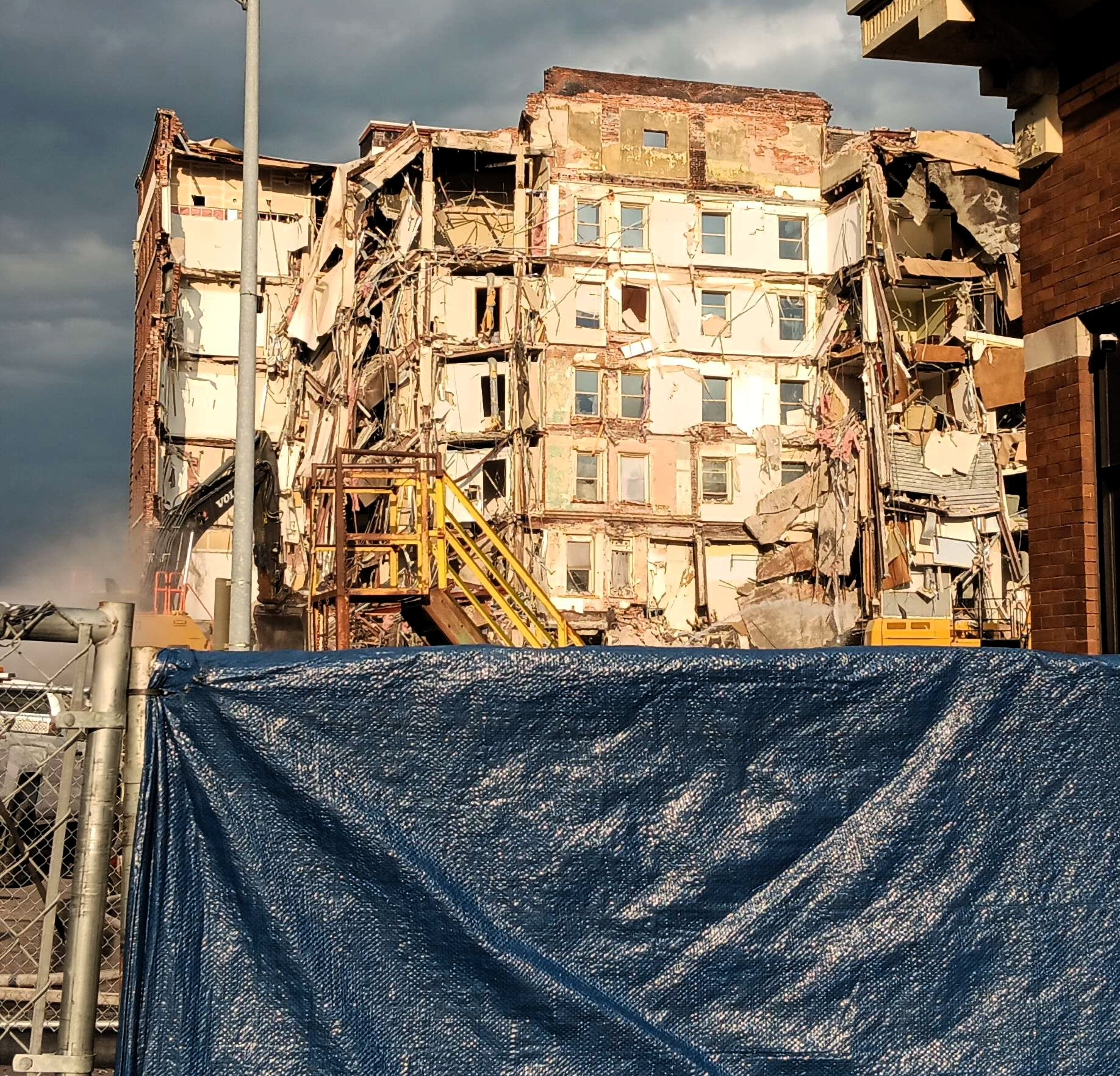
The rear of the building during demolition.

On May 28, 2023, at approximately 5 p.m. CDT, the building partially collapsed. The collapse destroyed a significant section of the building's rear and killed three people. The collapse caused millions of dollars in damage.

At the time of the collapse there were 53 residents registered as living in the 80-unit building. Surveillance footage obtained by CNN shows a chunk of the rear's brick façade falling underneath a second-story window. The lower portion of the wall proceeded to crumble, followed by more façade falling. In the final minute before the collapse, a support brace bends before part of the building collapsed at approximately 5:00 p.m. CDT. One resident remembers hearing booming sounds but had figured they were coming from the street outside, until neighbors started screaming. She picked up her toddler and ran, but soon found that at least one staircase was blocked by debris.

Eight people were rescued and about a dozen others were escorted out of the building, with additional search and rescue delayed until water and gas utilities could be shut off. On May 29, the city initially stated that there was no credible information that anyone was missing and that they would move forward with demolition plans the next day. However, after an over 150 person search effort that used thermal imaging, drones and search and rescue dogs, a missing resident was discovered alive and rescued from her fourth-story window. Five tenants were still unaccounted for, two of which were reportedly in the building during the collapse and were still reportedly missing after a search on May 30 where several animals were rescued from the building. On June 3 the body of one of the missing tenants was recovered from the rubble of the collapsed building. On June 5, the remains of two other victims were recovered.

Multiple people protested at the site, with signs such as "Save Lives Not Property" in regard to the multiple people still reportedly missing. The City of Davenport filed a new enforcement action against the building owner, Andrew Wold, and he was fined $300 for failure to maintain the structure and $95 in court fees.

After the collapse an inspector working for the City of Davenport altered an inspection record on the building from PASS to FAIL, indicating an attempt to change the original status of the building's condition and calling into question the integrity of Davenport's inspection process.

=== Victims ===
Three people died, aged between 42 and 60 years-old. On June 3, the body of one of the missing tenants was recovered from the rubble of the collapsed building. On June 5, the remains of two other victims were recovered.

At least one resident was severely injured in the collapse, with one of her legs having to be amputated in order for her to be safely extracted from the rubble.

=== Legal ===
On May 30, the city of Davenport had filed a new enforcement action against the owner of the building, as he had failed to maintain the building in a "safe, sanitary, and structurally sound condition" with a $300 fine. The legal purpose of the citation was to prevent the owner from transferring the property to avoid a demolition order.

Shortly after the collapse, a tenant filed a lawsuit which accused the city of Davenport, the building's current and former owners, along with two other companies, of knowing of the deterioration of the building and allowing it to continue without notifying tenants of the risks.

=== Demolition ===
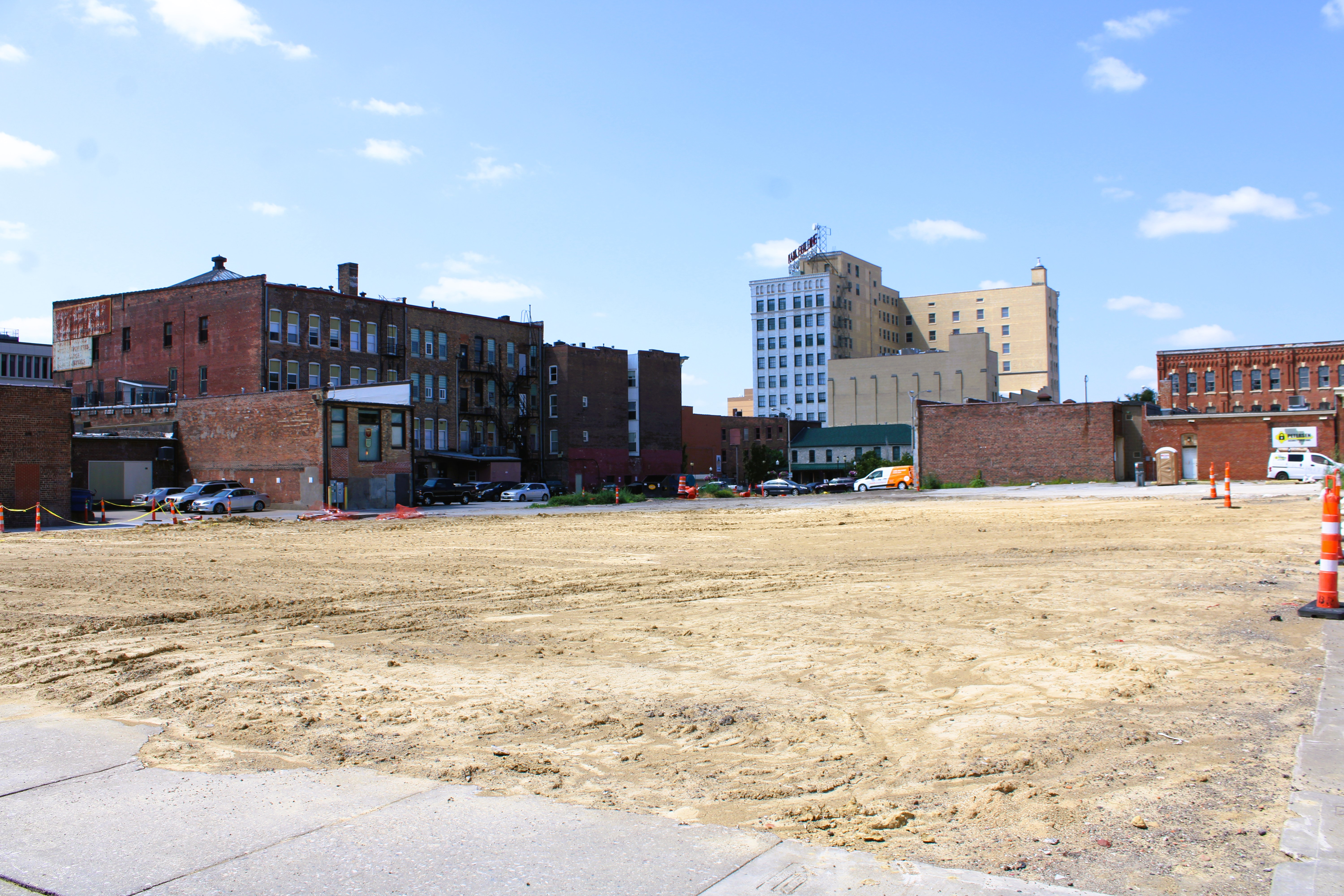
The former location of the building.

On June 6, 2023, demolition was planned to start on the partially collapsed building. City officials initially reported that demolition would start two days after the collapse, but there were numerous delays due to protesters pushing for the search of missing individuals. There were also health concerns due to possible asbestos and other hazardous materials located inside the building, which prompted the city to order individuals living nearby to evacuate. Demolition began on June 12, 2023.

== Architecture ==
The Davenport Hotel was designed by a local architecture firm, Temple and Burrows with P.T. Burrows as the architect in charge. They were also responsible for the Hotel Blackhawk, the Union Savings Bank and Trust (1924), and the Federal Court House (1932–1933).

The building was six stories in height and was constructed in brick over a steel structure. It most likely had a concrete and brick foundation. The building's character was defined by its form as its decorative elements were more reserved. The six-story "towers" surrounded a two-story entrance in the center, which created a sense of mass and enclosure. The building's exterior decorative elements were confined to a cornice, which is now gone, and the main entrance. It is possible the cornice was lost in the 1939 fire. The first floor contained retail space, with apartments on the upper floors.
