= Hotel Blackhawk =

- Blackhawk Hotel
- U.S. National Register of Historic Places
- U.S. Historic district – Contributing property
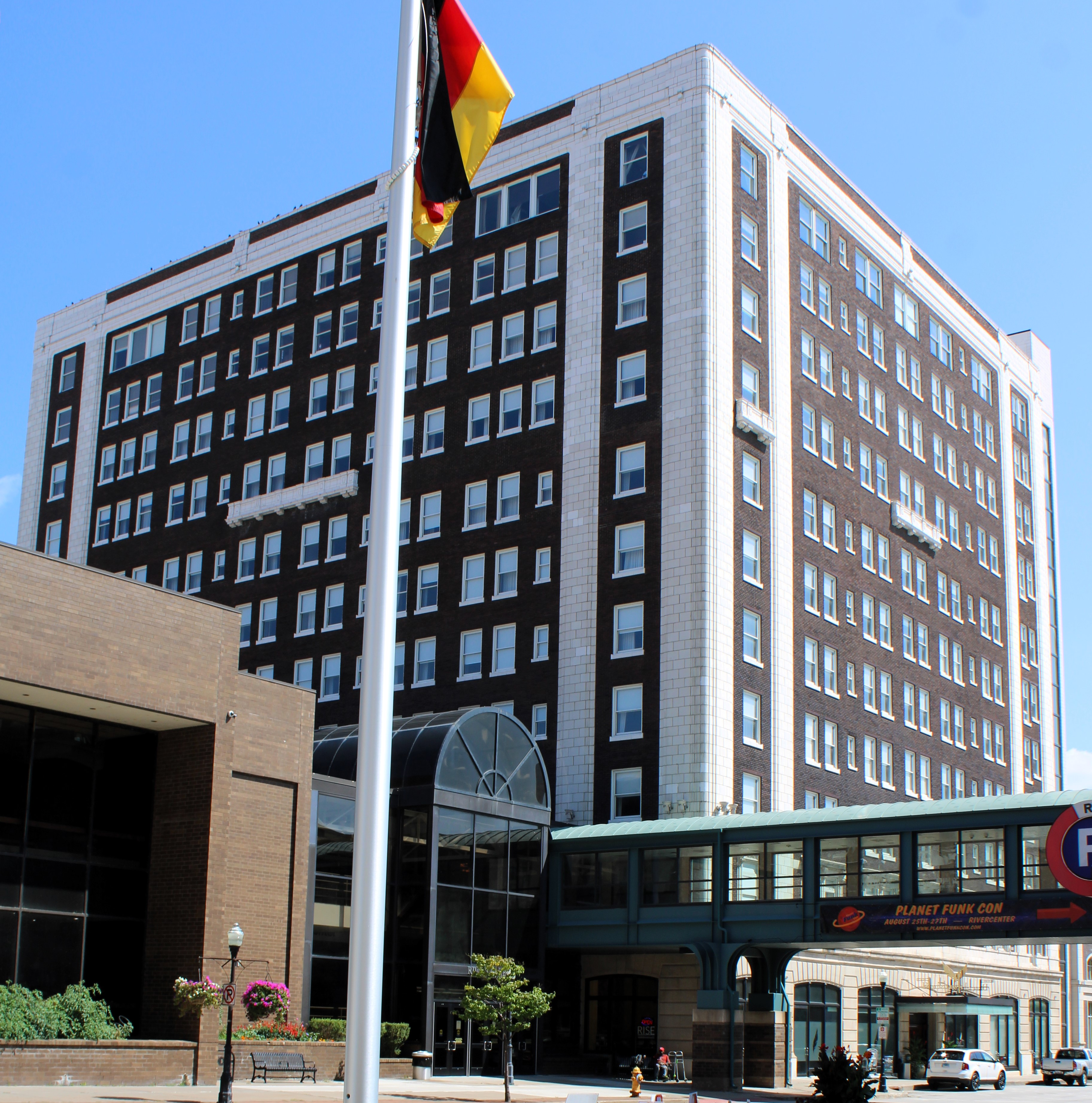
- Hotel Blackhawk in 2023

- Location within Iowa Location within the United States
- Location: 200 E 3rd St. Davenport, Iowa
- Coordinates: 41°31′22″N 90°34′20″W
- Area: less than one acre
- Built: 1915, 1920
- Built by: McCarthy Improvement Co. (1915); Walsh Co. (1920)
- Architect: Temple & Burrows; Arthur Ebeling
- Architectural style: Renaissance Revival
- Part of: Davenport Downtown Commercial Historic District (ID100005546)
- MPS: Davenport MRA
- NRHP reference No.: 83002402
- Added to NRHP: July 07, 1983

The Hotel Blackhawk is an eleven-story brick and terra cotta building located in Downtown Davenport, Iowa, United States. It is a Marriott Autograph Collection property.

The hotel is connected to the north building of the RiverCenter, Davenport's convention center, and across the street from the RiverCenter south building. The hotel is just down the street from the Adler Theatre. The Blackhawk has been host to several high-profile people including Presidents Barack Obama, Herbert Hoover, Richard Nixon, writer Carl Sandburg, and boxer Jack Dempsey. Actor Cary Grant was staying at the Blackhawk Hotel when he died in Davenport. The hotel named rooms 412–414 the "Nixon Suite". Big bands such as Guy Lombardo and Stan Kenton played at the Blackhawk on many occasions. It has been individually listed on the National Register of Historic Places as the Blackhawk Hotel since 1983. In 2020 it was included as a contributing property in the Davenport Downtown Commercial Historic District.

== History ==
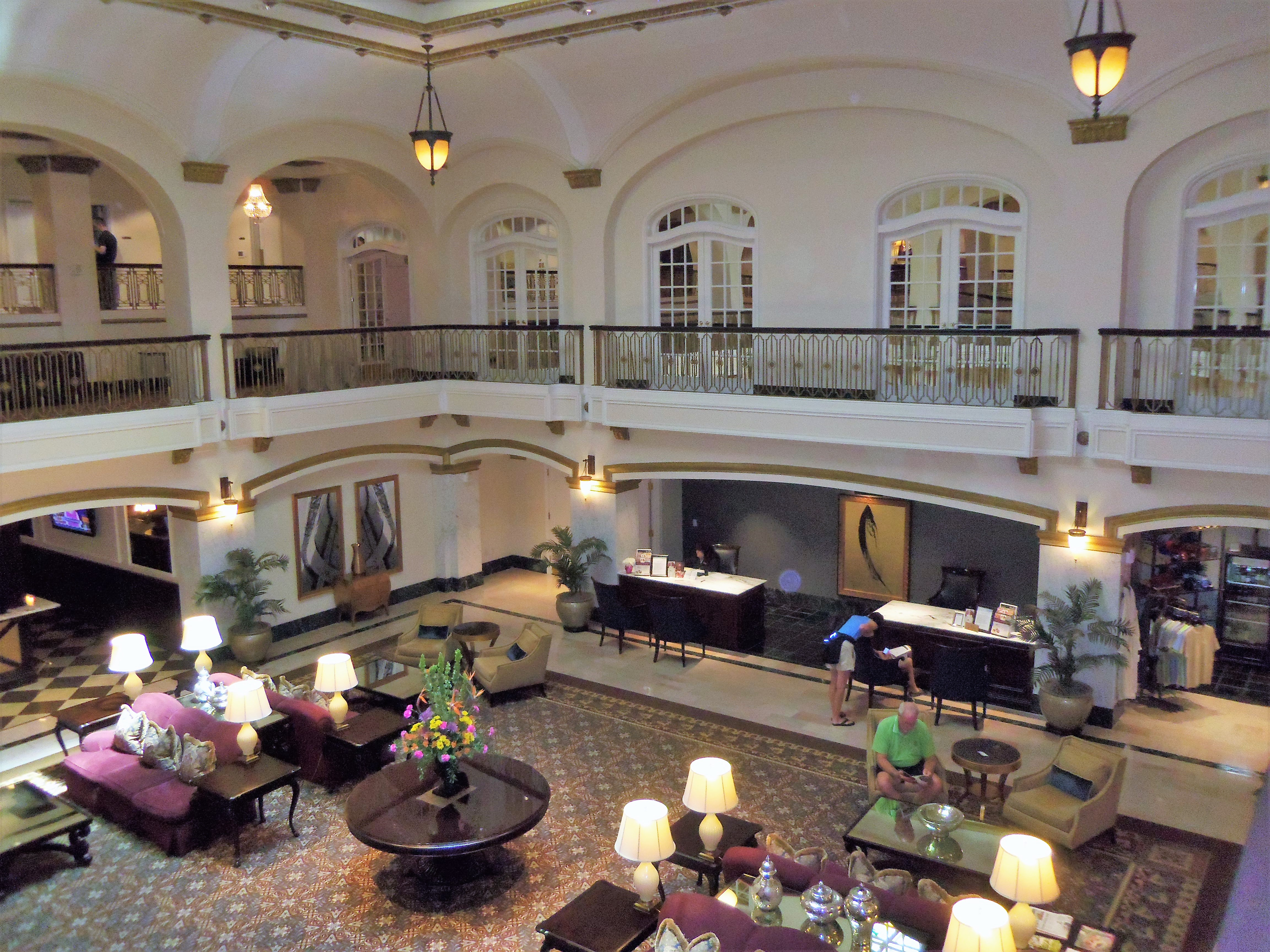
Hotel Lobby

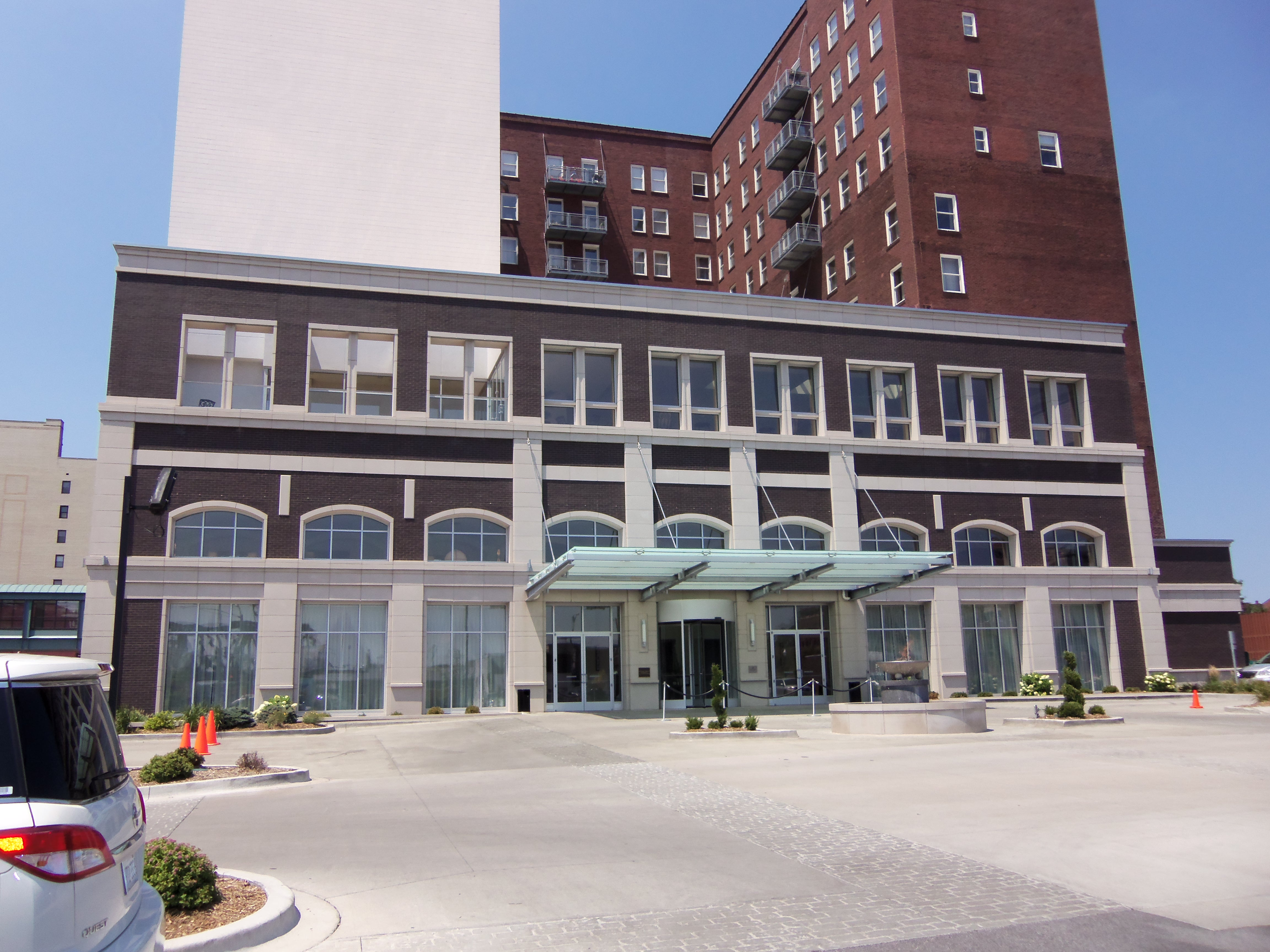
Entrance built in 2010

Before the construction of the Blackhawk Hotel, the Saratoga Hotel occupied the land. On February 16, 1915, the first seven floors (225 rooms) of the "New Fireproof Hotel Blackhawk" were completed. The building was built at a cost of $1 million by Davenport businessman W.F. Miller. McCarthy Improvement Company was the general contractor. In 1920 the remaining stories, eight through eleven, were added and it gave the hotel 400 rooms. Walsh Company was the general contractor for the addition.

In 1916 the Blackhawk Hotel Corporation expanded with the purchase of the Davenport Hotel, which is located two blocks to the west. Over the next twenty years, Blackhawk Hotels purchased properties in St. Paul, Minnesota and Des Moines and Mason City, Iowa. The corporation was reorganized in 1935. That same year a Junior Ballroom was constructed and the Gold Room was enlarged. A new dining room called the Pompeian Room was opened. The new additions cost $25,000 to complete. Space on the mezzanine level could accommodate 1,000 diners. A sidewalk canopy replaced a marquee over the main entrance in 1955.

In 1967 the hotel was sold to George Norman & Co. who in turn sold it to the Blackhawk American Corporation two years later for more than $1 million. The hotel was once again renovated in 1969. The following year the hotel upgraded its heating system from coal and oil to natural gas.

Plans to convert the hotel into a 300 unit low-rent facility for the elderly were announced on October 13, 1971. A petition for foreclosure on the mortgage was filed in Scott County District Court on December 16, 1971. Financing by the Federal Housing Administration to convert the hotel to low-rent housing was delayed in early 1972, and Blackhawk American Corp. announced that the hotel would remain open despite the setbacks. On January 20, 1972, plans for converting the Blackhawk to elderly housing were dropped. On December 13, 1973, stockholders were told the hotel was bankrupt. A foreclosure lawsuit was filed against the hotel on March 14, 1974. A U.S. Marshal's sale of the property on June 28, 1974, failed to produce a buyer as did an auction in November of the same year. The Small Business Administration, who now owned the hotel, considered selling the property for less than the $820,000 they had put into the building.

The Blackhawk was sold to Blackhawk Hotel Associates, a subsidiary of Knightsbridge, for $1.2 million on January 28, 1975. An auction of the hotel's furnishings and accessories was held the following month. In June of that year phase one of a nearly $1 million renovation was completed. A year later the Davenport Bank and Trust Company foreclosed on the hotel's $990,000 mortgage. Judge Max Werling ordered the Blackhawk closed on June 29, 1976. The bank bought the hotel in October of that year at a sheriff's sale for $1 million.

The building sat empty until Phillips Enterprises began a major renovation of the Blackhawk in 1978. The multimillion-dollar project was completed the following year. More than 7,000 people showed up to tour the renovated hotel on September 15, 1979. The Sundance Social Club opened as the hotel's restaurant. The Blackhawk was part of the "Super Block" development that opened in 1983. It was the first phase of the city's convention center that would be named the RiverCenter. The hotel would also serve as the convention center's caterer.

John E. Connelly, a Pittsburgh developer, bought the hotel in 1990 and it became a part of his gambling enterprise that included the President riverboat. The hotel passed to the Isle of Capri Casino in 2000 when it bought the Davenport riverboat gambling operation.

On February 12, 2006, a fire started in a meth lab on the eighth floor. The hotel had been deteriorating steadily since it was purchased by the Isle of Capri. The City of Davenport took over the property from the Isle of Capri. In October 2008, a development agreement was signed which gave ownership of the property to Hotel Blackhawk, LLC, an affiliate of St. Louis-based developer Restoration St. Louis, Inc. The company announced plans for a $46 million-plus restoration. BSI Construction was selected as the general contractor for the project. Demolition work began in January 2009 and renovation work commenced in April of the same year. The hotel re-opened on December 15, 2010.

On September 22, 2010, the RiverCenter/Adler Theatre, Hotel Blackhawk, and the Radisson Quad City Plaza Hotel announced a cooperative marketing agreement branding themselves the "Quad Cities Event Center." While each remains a separate entity they will advertise and market themselves together. All three entities form one complex that is connected by skywalks and includes a total of 116,700 square feet (11,000 m^{2}) of space.

On March 6, 2013, the owner, Hotel Blackhawk, LLC, entered the property into the Marriott Autograph Collection of luxury hotels, a group of independently owned and operated hotels associated with Marriott Hotels and Resorts. The Hotel Blackhawk is now a Four Diamond hotel (AAA), managed by Innkeeper Hospitality Services, LLC of St. Louis, and has been voted the best hotel in Iowa for the last three years by Business Insider. It continues to be a major force behind the resurgence of Downtown Davenport.

== Architecture ==
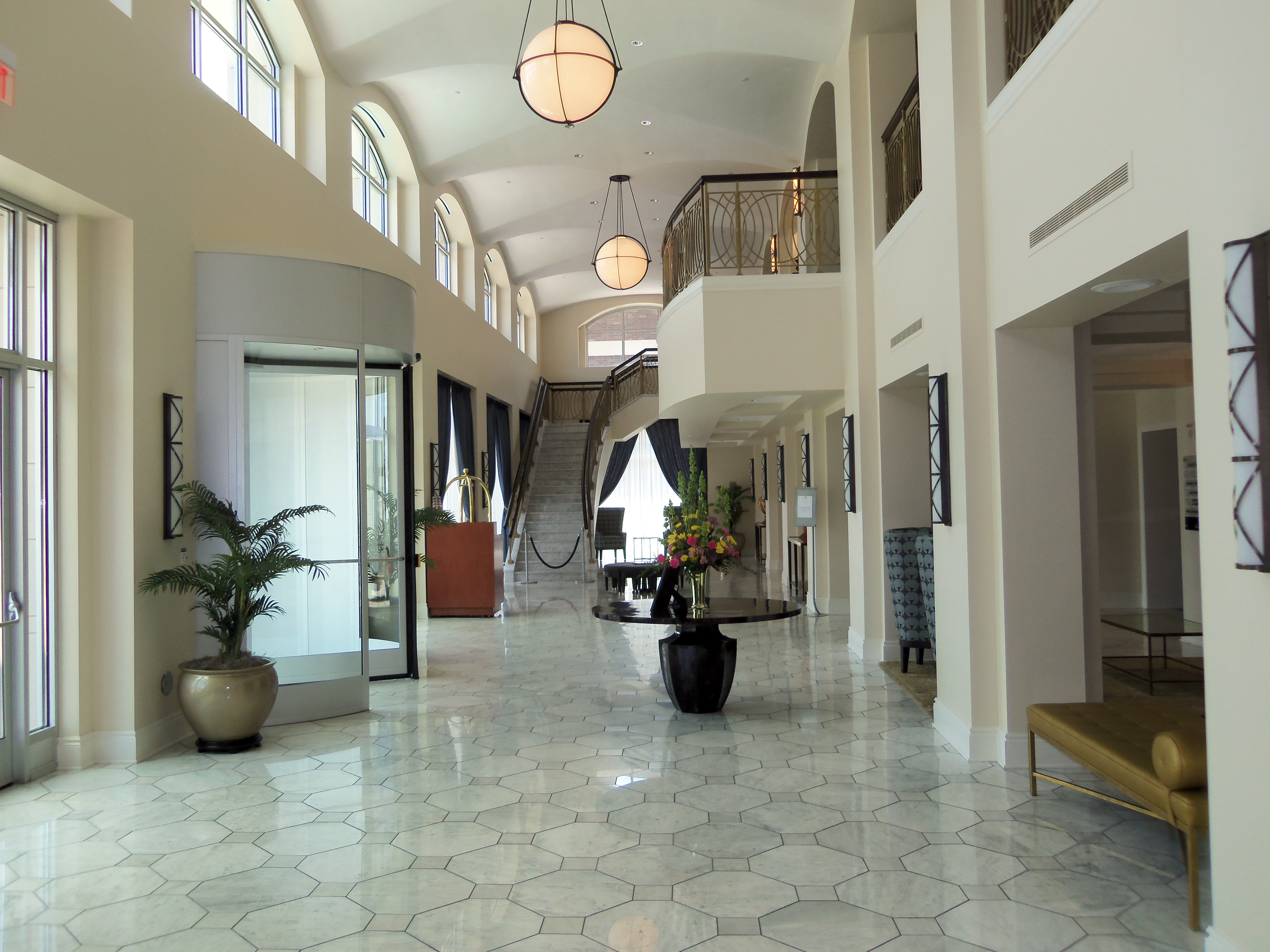
Foyer in the new entrance area

The Hotel Blackhawk was designed by the Davenport architectural firm of Temple & Burrows. Davenport architect Arthur Ebeling served as an associate on the construction project. It features Italian Renaissance design elements along with modern Art Deco. The Italian Renaissance is featured on the rusticated stonework on the entry-level, the granite pedestals and terra cotta pilasters on the corners of the main façade, and the decorative pediments of the windows on the second floor. The Art Deco elements are found in the rolled of the corners of the terracotta pilasters and the streamlined feeling in general of the form itself. The simplified Renaissance Revival style of the hotel is in keeping with the Neoclassicism of other major commercial buildings that were being built at the time in Davenport. When the top four floors were added it required the removal of the building's original cornice. The resulting termination of the structure makes it more similar to the Moderne style of the nearby Hotel Mississippi, built in 1931.

The building is 140 feet (43 m) tall. It is U-shaped to allow for windows in all the rooms and to allow for air circulation and light. The structure is covered in dark-colored bricks that contrast with the white terra cotta. This surface combination sets it apart from the surface monochrome of dressed stone that was being used in other commercial buildings in the city. An elevator shaft was added to the east side of the building in the 1978–1979 renovation. Originally the lobby contained a two-story atrium, but it was enclosed in later years to create additional meeting space. The atrium was restored as a part of the 2010 renovation to the building. A new entrance was also added to the east side of the building facing the parking lot.

Upon its 2010 re-opening, Hotel Blackhawk includes 20 one- and two-bedroom apartments, 130 guestrooms, nine extended-stay rooms and banquet and meeting facilities that include a renovated Gold Room. A bowling alley was re-created in the basement level and shops were incorporated into the main level along with a restaurant and lounge. A new fitness center and a swimming pool, as well as a business center, were also created.
