= Bulley & Andrews =

Building contractor in Chicago

Bulley & Andrews, LLC.
- Industry: Construction Management, General Contracting, Design Build, Masonry restoration
- Founded: 1891; 135 years ago
- Headquarters: Chicago, Illinois, United States
- Website: www.bulley.com

Bulley & Andrews, LLC is one of Chicago's oldest general contractors.

The firm was founded in 1891 as a partnership of Frederick Bulley, a 21-year-old English stonemason, partnered with Alfred Andrews, an architect.

== Notable projects ==
- Hinsdale Hospital, New Patient Pavilion, Hinsdale, IL
- Ronald McDonald House Charities, Downtown: Chicago, IL
- Radgale House, Lake Forest, IL
- Lycee Francais: Chicago, IL
- Illinois Holocaust Museum and Education Center: Skokie, IL
- S&C Electric Advanced Technology Center: Chicago, IL
- The University of Chicago Searle Chemistry Laboratory: Chicago, IL
- Jewish Reconstructionist Congregation: Evanston, IL
- DePaul University Monsignor Andrew J. McGowan Science Building: Chicago, IL
- The Richard H. Driehaus Museum: Chicago, IL Nickerson House
- Northwestern Memorial Hospital cGMP Cell Therapy Lab: Chicago, IL
