= Mississippi Lofts and Adler Theatre =

- Hotel Mississippi and RKO Orpheum Theater
- U.S. National Register of Historic Places
- U.S. Historic district – Contributing property
- Davenport Register of Historic Properties
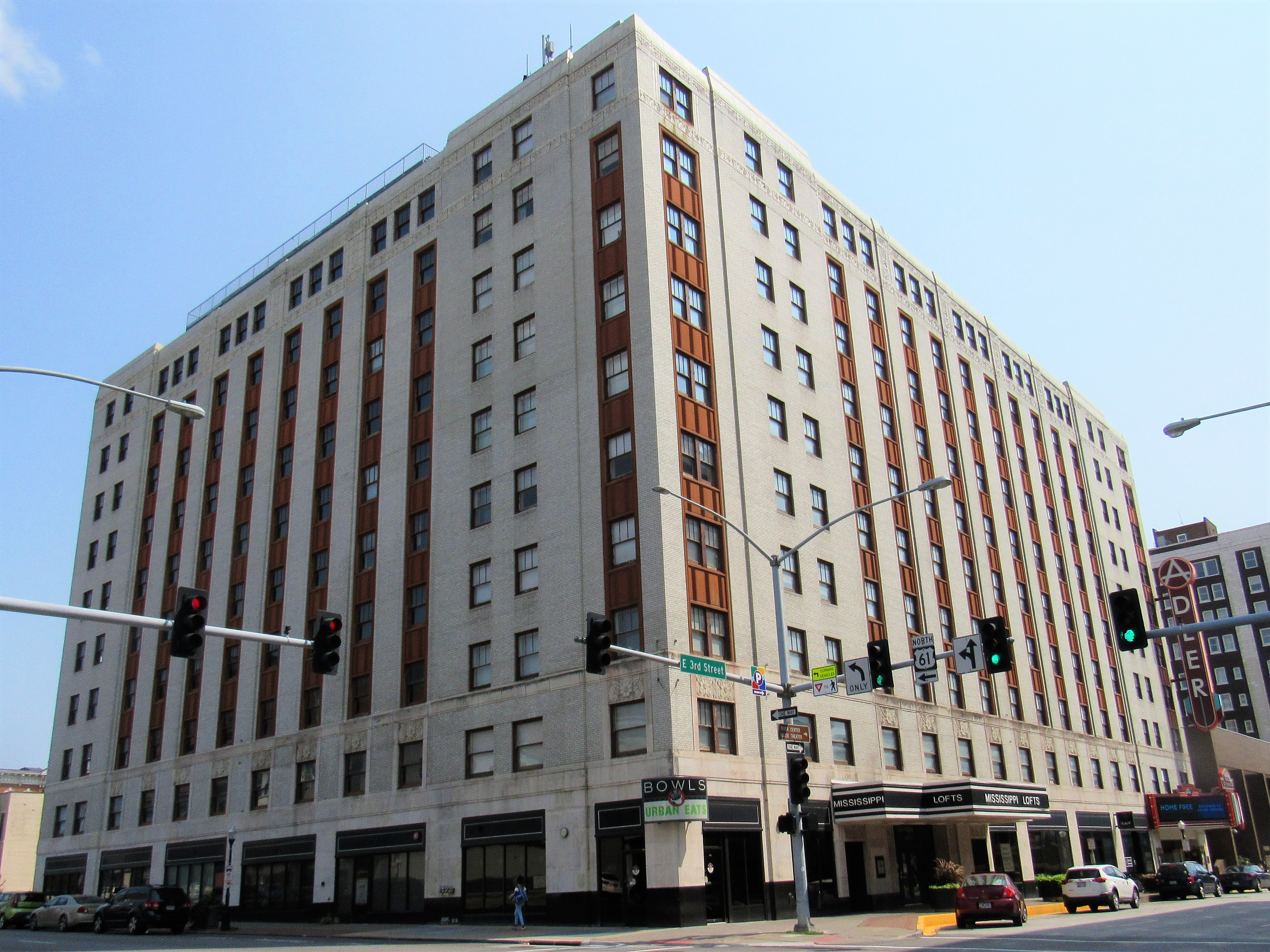

- Location within Iowa Location within the United States
- Location: 106 E. 3rd Street; Davenport, Iowa
- Coordinates: 41°31′22″N 90°34′26″W
- Area: less than one acre
- Built: 1931
- Built by: Lundoff-Bicknell Company
- Architect: A.S. Graven; Henry Dreyfuss
- Architectural style: Art Deco
- Part of: Davenport Downtown Commercial Historic District (ID100005546)
- MPS: Davenport MRA
- NRHP reference No.: 98001273
- DRHP No.: 45

Significant dates
- Added to NRHP: October 22, 1998
- Designated DRHP: August 3, 2005

The Mississippi Lofts and Adler Theatre is an apartment building and theater complex located in downtown Davenport, Iowa, United States. It is individually listed on the National Register of Historic Places by its original name, the Hotel Mississippi and RKO Orpheum Theater. The Hotel Mississippi was listed on the Davenport Register of Historic Properties in 2005. In 2020 the complex was included as a contributing property in the Davenport Downtown Commercial Historic District.

== Hotel Mississippi and RKO Orpheum Theater ==
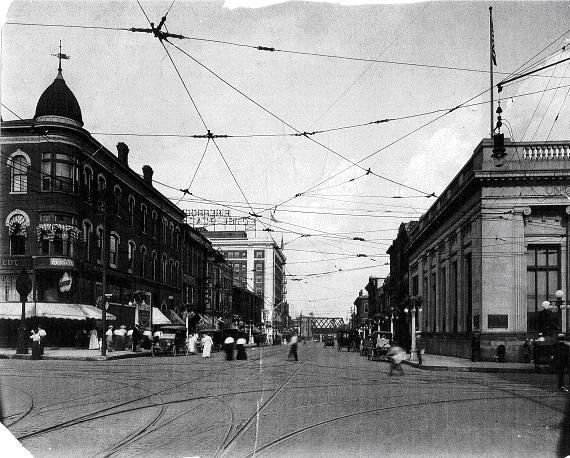
The Davenport Block (c. 1915) on the left where the Mississippi Lofts and Adler Theatre stand today.

The Hotel Mississippi was the last large-scale hotel to be built in the third phase of hotel construction in downtown Davenport after the Davenport Hotel in 1909 and the Hotel Blackhawk in 1915. The hotel and theater were designed by A.S. Graven of the Chicago architectural firm of Graven & Mayger. Henry Dreyfuss of New York City, an art consultant for the RKO chain, was involved with the theater but it's not exactly clear how. Contemporary accounts suggest he "was to provide an aesthetic sensibility and theatrical functionality to the theater derived from his years as a theatrical set designer." Its developer, George Bechtel, organized one of the first investment bond houses in Iowa in 1891. It specialized in buying and selling municipal bonds. He was able secure the means for the construction of the hotel during the Great Depression. The complex was built by the Lundoff-Bicknell Company. It is situated on the site that was occupied by the Davenport Block, a commercial block built by Col. George Davenport, one of the founders of the city of Davenport and its namesake.

The hotel opened in November 1931 with 200 guest rooms and 50 apartments. It was initially operated by the Black Hawk Hotels Corporation of Davenport. The hotel struggled financially in the 1930s with an occupancy rate of about 25%. The hotel's restaurant and kitchen were located in the basement. Businesses such as a coffee shop, drug store, a clothier, realtor, floral shop and a beauty salon have been housed on the first floor over the years. By the 1970s the complex was owned by the Verdi Corporation, which was owned by prominent local realtor Mel Foster, Jr. and contractor Dudley Priester. The Mel Foster Company had its corporate headquarters in the building until the 1980s in what had been a Walgreens drug store location. By the early 1980s, the building had been converted into an apartment building. During this time period the local chamber of commerce leased space on the first floor of the building.

The RKO Orpheum Theater was a 2,700-seat theater that was built at the same time as the hotel, which surrounds the theater to the south and west. It was one of five RKO Orpheum Theaters to open that year. It was also Iowa's largest movie house. The theater featured then up-to-date cinema equipment and a fully equipped stage that could accommodate vaudeville shows, concerts, and Broadway roadshow productions. The planned pipe organ, however, was never installed. Its grand opening was held on November 25, 1931, with Ginger Rogers sending a telegram from Hollywood to begin the ribbon-cutting ceremony. Her movie, Suicide Fleet, and five vaudeville acts accompanied by the theater's house orchestra were the opening night entertainment. Because of its size and modern facilities, the Orpheum became the Tri Cities cinema showplace, and it hosted all of Hollywood's major releases. Entertainers such as Tallulah Bankhead, Paul Robeson, Imogene Coca, Dorothy Lamour, Phil Ford, Forrest Tucker, John Barrymore, Liberace, Ella Fitzgerald, Pearl Bailey, Jack Benny, Sammy Cahn, Phyllis Diller, Jimmy Dean, Stan Kenton, The Beach Boys, Sonny & Cher, The Supremes, and The Pointer Sisters and Kiss, performed in the theater live. The original ticket booth and seven display advertising cases remain in place at the main entrance.

=== Architecture ===
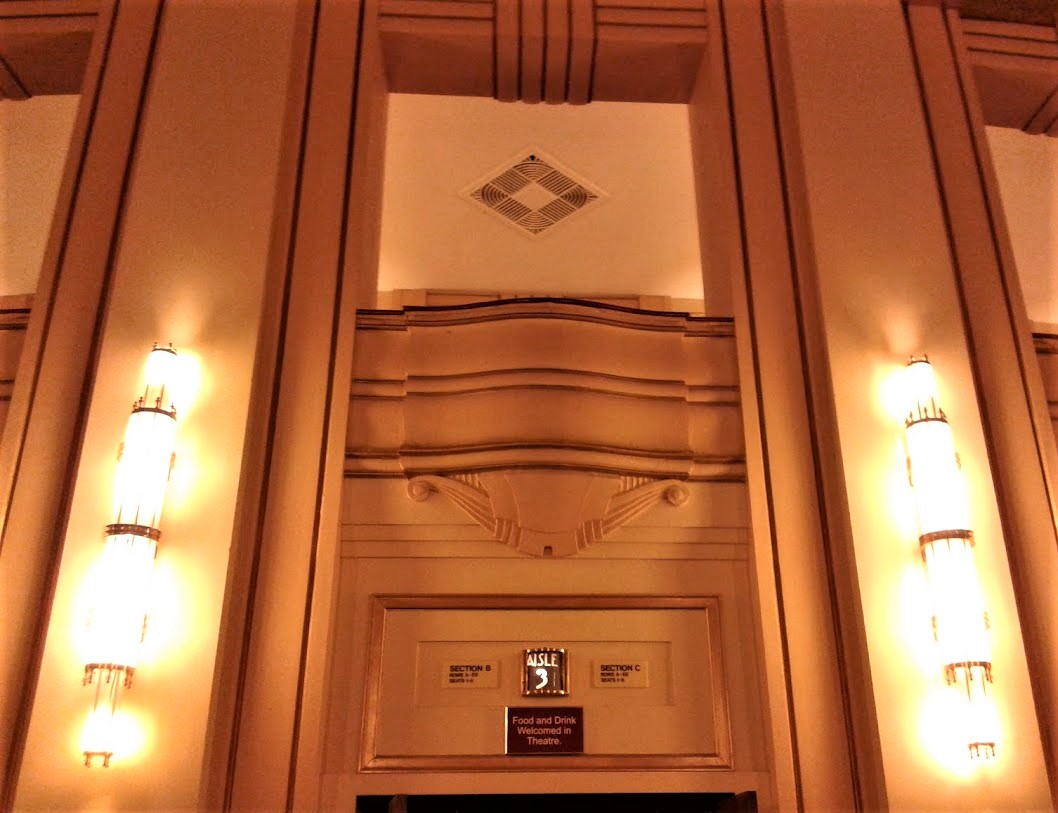
Adler Theatre Lobby detail

The hotel portion of the facility is a ten-story L-shaped brick and granite building surrounding the seven-story theater. The ten-story portion of the building is 119.51 feet (36.43 m) high. Three passenger elevators provided access to the upper floors. All of the hotel rooms faced out from the outside of the "L." There were no interior facing rooms. The verticality of the building is established by way of the vertically aligned windows that are separated by decorative panels. The Art Deco style is employed throughout the building, including the theater interior. Overall, the façade is void of excessive ornamentation. However, the stylized geometry indicative of the Art Deco style is found on the horizontal banding that defines the tenth floor. Decorative terracotta panels with a floral motif are also used to define the mezzanine level of the lower stories.

The theater's two-story grand lobby features a ceiling that rises to about 22 feet (6.7 m), a grand staircase, and a mezzanine to access the balcony seats. Mirrored openings and curved edge pseudo balconies on the east wall of the lobby match the real balconies and openings on the west side. The lobby ceiling is a series of recessed stepped pyramid openings that are arranged in a large rectangular panel. Two large chandeliers with crystal strands form geometric patterns that are consistent with the theater's Art Deco style.

== Mississippi Lofts and Adler Theatre ==
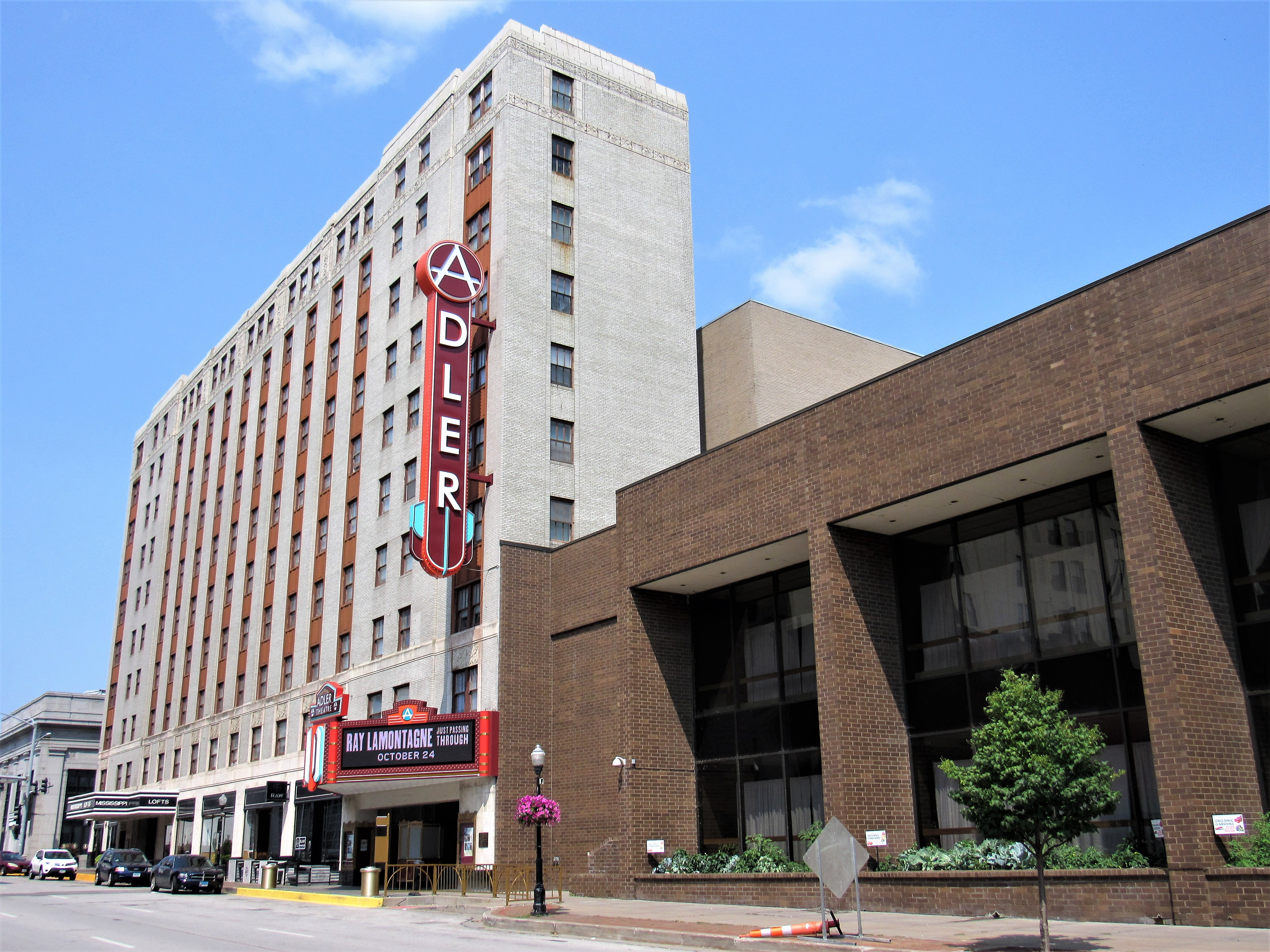
The Adler Theatre can be seen just behind Mississippi Lofts and the RiverCenter

The theater had deteriorated over the years and by the 1970s the RKO Orpheum was rarely being used because of its large size and the advent of multiplex movie theaters. The last movie shown in the theater was Cleopatra Jones on September 11, 1973. The theater was used on occasion for road shows and rock concerts. In 1981, an effort began to restore the theater. The Davenport Chamber of Commerce bought the theater and donated it to the RiverCenter For The Performing Arts, a non-profit group that was established to raise money to restore the theater and operate it as a performing arts center. The theater restoration project lasted from 1985 to 1986. The Davenport architectural firm of Scholtz-Kuehn and Paul S. Veneklasen, an acoustics consultant from Santa Monica, California were responsible for the plans. The project included restoring the original crystal and glass chandeliers and rebuilding and reupholstering the original seats. New carpeting was reproduced in England using a roll of the original floral woolen carpeting that was found during the remodeling project.

The renovated theater is a part of the adjacent convention center complex called the RiverCenter that opened in fall 1983. The convention center connects the Adler Theatre with the Hotel Blackhawk. A passageway with a new box office connects the theater and convention center at the theater's entresol. It was at this time that the theater was renamed the Adler Theatre after E.P. Adler and his son Phillip D. Adler. They had been newspaper publishers and philanthropists in Davenport and the decision to rename the theater was based on a $1.3 million endowment from Lee Enterprises, the company they led.

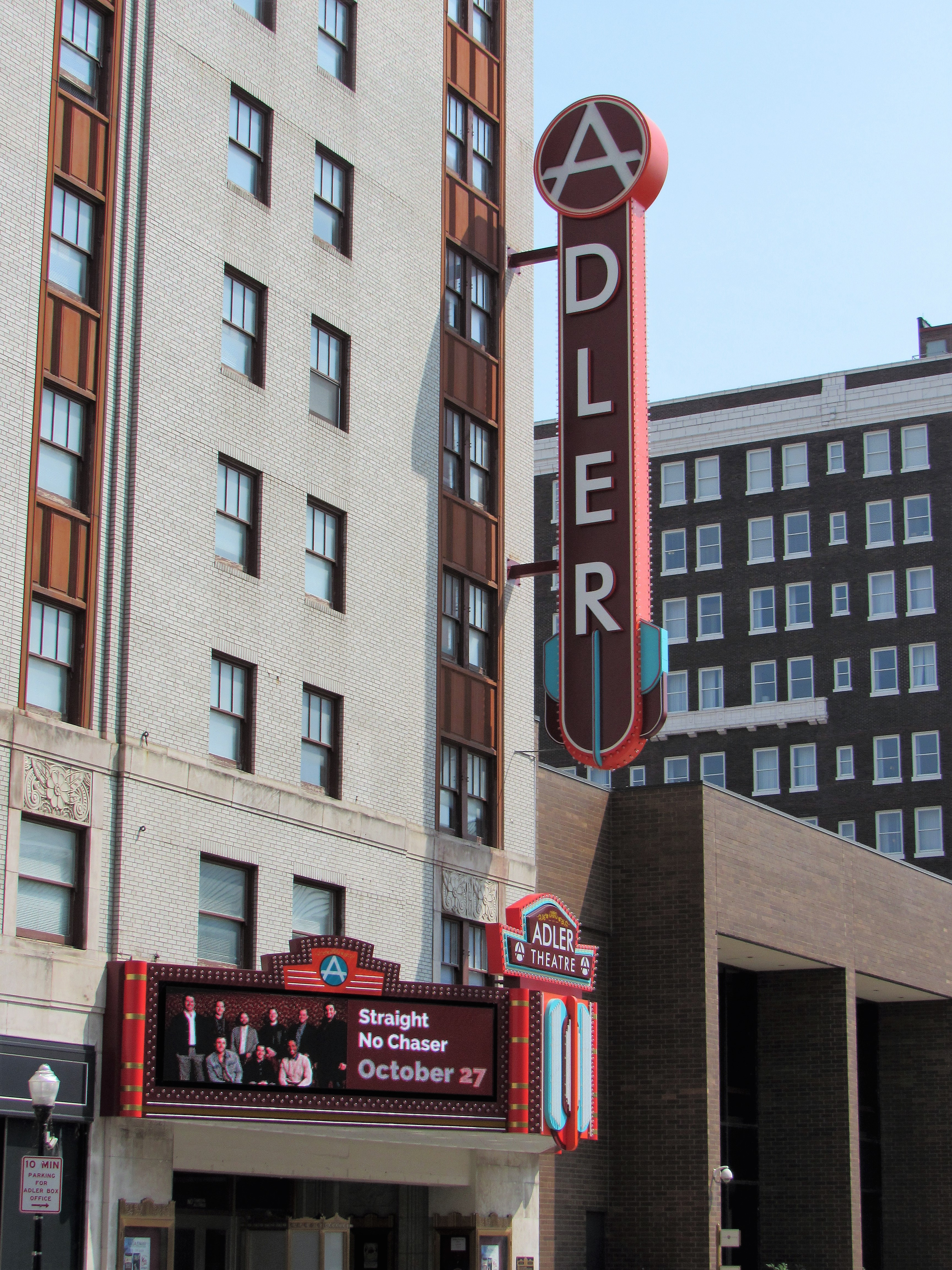
The 2018 Adler Theatre marquee.

In 2004, the City of Davenport bought the former Hotel Mississippi for $739,000 for the expansion of the Adler Theatre. In autumn 2006, a $10.5 million renovation was completed at the Alder. The theater's stage was expanded from a depth of 29 feet (9 m) to 41 feet (12 m) into what was the west wing of the hotel. The renovations also included a new loading dock, additional dressing rooms, improved sound and computerized rigging systems. The architect for this renovation was Van Dijk, Westlake, Reed, & Leskosky of Cleveland, Ohio, led by principal architect Paul Westlake. The theater is home to the Quad City Symphony Orchestra, Ballet Quad Cities, and hosts a Broadway tour series annually.

At the same time as the theater was being renovated, the Hotel Mississippi was undergoing an $8.5 million renovation. The last tenants were moved out of the old hotel in 2004 and 56 new apartments were created primarily on the south side of the building. The project was completed in spring 2007. J&T Development LLC of Chicago was in charge of the renovation. In addition to creating new apartments, the lobby area was restored to its past appearance. The project restored its multi-colored terrazzo floors, Art Deco-style elevator doors, and walnut and teak wood paneling. The loft manager's office was created from the hotel's former check-in desk.

In November 2010, a new temporary marquee facade was installed above the main entrance of the theater. It replaced one that was installed in 1997, but used its frame. The 2010 marquee was replaced in April 2018 by a new $340,000 structure designed by Michigan architect Eric Larsen and built by Wagner Electric Sign Company of Elyria, Ohio. It features two 30-foot (9.1 m) angled panels with LED screens that advertise upcoming shows, and a 36-foot (11 m) vertical blade sign with the theater's name. The inspiration for the new marquee was the theatre's original 1931 RKO Theater marquee. The City of Davenport and private donations paid for the project.
