= William Carbys Zimmerman =

American architect

William Carbys Zimmerman (1856–1932) was an American architect. He was the Illinois State Architect from 1905 to 1915, designing many state-funded buildings, especially at the University of Illinois. He was a partner of Flanders & Zimmerman.

== Biography ==
Zimmerman was born in 1856 in Thiensville, Wisconsin, and attended the Massachusetts Institute of Technology. Upon graduation in 1880s he moved to Chicago, Illinois. He was admitted as a junior partner in John J. Flanders' architectural firm in 1886. There, Zimmerman gained a reputation as an able designer of residences in popular revival styles. He became a fellow of the American Institute of Architects and opened an independent practice in Steinway Hall in 1898. Zimmerman at first continued to design houses, largely in the Chicago neighborhoods of Rogers Park, Kenwood, and Edgewater.

Zimmerman was appointed Illinois State Architect in 1905, a role he held for ten years. This presented Zimmerman with the opportunity to design major works on behalf of the state government. He was also named the architect to Chicago's West Park Commission in 1907. During this period, Zimmerman began to shift to a style more influenced by the Prairie School. He later admitted his son and son-in-law as partners of Zimmerman, Saxe, and Zimmerman.

== List of works ==
All buildings in Illinois unless otherwise noted

- William Carbys Zimmerman House, Chicago, 1887
- Eckhart & Swan Mill, Chicago, 1897
- Archer Daniels Midland Wheat Mill (1897), Chicago
- 5544 S. Woodlawn Avenue, Chicago, 1898
- Gross House, 1100 and 1106 Oak Avenue, Evanston, 1901
- Charles Adams Goodyear House, Chicago, 1902
- Nichols House, Winnetka, 1905
- Joseph Downey House, Chicago, 1906
- Percy Eckhart House, Kenilworth, 1906
- Frank K. Hoover House, Chicago, 1906
- William M. Crilly House, Chicago, 1908
- Illinois Supreme Court Building, Springfield, Illinois, 1908
- Pinewold, Lake Forest, 1908
- University of Illinois Natural History Building additions, Urbana, 1909 and 1910
- Ray O. West House, Chicago, 1909
- W. B. Wolff House, Chicago, 1909
- William O. Johnson House, Chicago, 1910
- Warren House, 2829 Sheridan Place, Evanston, 1912
- University of Illinois Commerce Building (now the David Dodds Henry Administration Building), Urbana, 1912
- University of Illinois English Building renovation, Urbana, 1913
- Pulaski Park, Chicago, 1914
- University of Illinois Armory, Urbana, 1914
- Stateville Correctional Center, Crest Hill, Illinois 1917 - 1925
- Thomas Cusack Co. District Headquarters, Davenport, Iowa, 1922
- Aurora Elks Lodge No. 705, Aurora, 1926
- Vitagraph Film Exchange Building, Kansas City, Missouri, 1930
- Col. Roger Hosmer Morse House, Lake Forest, 1931
- Walgreen Drug Store/La Epoca Department Store, Downtown Miami Historic District, 1936
- University of Illinois Physics Building, Urbana
- Chicago 7th Regiment Armory, Chicago
- Douglass Park Refectory, Chicago
- Oak Woods Cemetery Chapel and Crematory
- Louis F. Swift House, Lake Forest
- University of Illinois Stock Pavilion, Urbana
