= History of Davenport, Iowa =

Davenport, Iowa, was part of the Louisiana Purchase. In 1814, during the War of 1812, the British military along with the Sauk and Meskwaki peoples fought against the Americans near Davenport. In August, Major Zachary Taylor, later the 12th President, fought a battle east of what is now Credit Island Park in Davenport. An outpost was set up at Fort Armstrong and George Davenport and Antoine LeClaire were stationed there.

Davenport was established in 1836 by Antoine Le Claire and named after his good friend Colonel George Davenport. The first settlers of Davenport were mostly Germans. After a county seat dilemma with neighboring town Rockingham in 1840, Davenport was established as the county seat of Scott County. Davenport was declared to be Iowa's first military headquarters just before the Civil War by Governor Samuel J. Kirkwood. In November 1865, the Iowa Soldiers' Orphans' Home was opened in Davenport to take in children left orphaned by the Civil War. In 1895, the city hall was built, and in 1897, the first chiropractic school in the world, Palmer Chiropractic College was opened.

Davenport experienced an economic and building boom in the 1920s and early 1930s. The Kahl Building and the Capitol Theatre, the baseball stadium, the Parker Building, and the Blackhawk Hotel are a few of the buildings built during this time period that are still standing. The Great Depression brought tough economic times to the city. The inclusion of new factories in the 1940s and 1950s helped turn the economy around after World War II. Davenport was on hard times once again with the farm crisis of the 1980s, when the Caterpillar Plant closed, costing 35,000 jobs. The city was rejuvenated once again in the 1990s and present by renovations and building additions.

== 19th century ==
=== Early 19th century ===
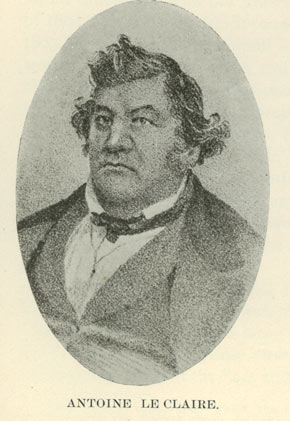
Antoine LeClaire was the primary founder of Davenport

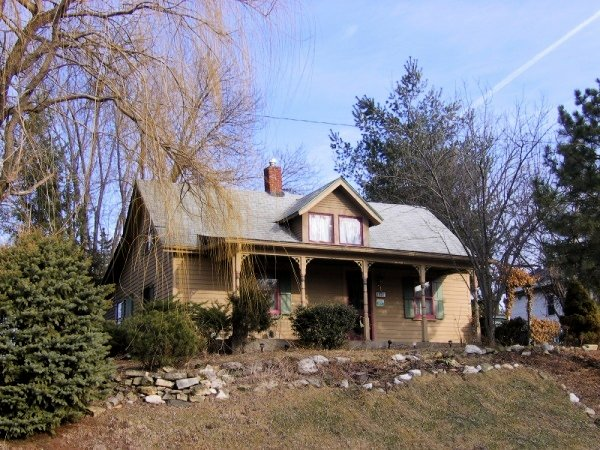
The Claim House was constructed by George L. Davenport, son of Colonel George Davenport, in 1832 or 1833 and is believed to be the oldest structure in the city.

In 1832, Chief Keokuk and General Winfield Scott signed a treaty to end the Black Hawk War. Antoine LeClaire, who was part French and part Pottawattamie, served as translator. A generous portion of land was given by Chief Keokuk to Marguerite LeClaire, Antoine's wife, as she was the granddaughter of a Sac chief. Keokuk stipulated that Antoine build their home on the exact spot where the treaty was signed or forfeit the land. Antoine did so, finishing the Treaty House in the spring of 1833. Davenport was established in 1836 by Antoine LeClaire and named after his good friend Colonel George Davenport.

Colonel Davenport arrived in 1816 with the establishment of Fort Armstrong. He acted as a "sutler", or supplier, for the army's Fort Armstrong. Fort Armstrong was located on the northwestern tip of Arsenal Island with the purpose of monitoring fur trade traffic in the area and keeping the peace between local Native American tribes. He contributed to the organization and mapping out of the community, now known as the Quad Cities. He also aided in establishing plans for the first railroad bridge to cross the Mississippi River.

=== County seat dilemma ===
In 1837, shortly after Scott County was formed, Davenport and rival neighbor Rockingham both campaigned to become the county seat. As stated by the Iowa Territory, the city with the most votes at the February 1838 election would become the county seat. On the eve of the election, Davenporters secured the temporary service of Dubuque laborers so that they could vote in the election. Davenport won the election. Rockingham supporters however, did not like this. They protested the elections to the territorial Governor. The Governor of the territory refused to certify the results of the election. A second election was scheduled for the following August. To avoid another import of voters, the Governor set a sixty-day residency requirement. Both cities proved to be corrupt as the second election drew near. Davenport was again the victor by only two votes. A third election was set by the Territorial Legislature for the summer of 1840. As the August election drew nearer, Rockinghamers grew tired of the county seat cause. Antoine Le Claire's $3,000 contribution and the efforts of other Davenporters were difficult to challenge. Davenport easily won the third election. To ensure the question of county seat would not arise again, Davenport built the first county courthouse.

=== Mid-Late 19th century ===
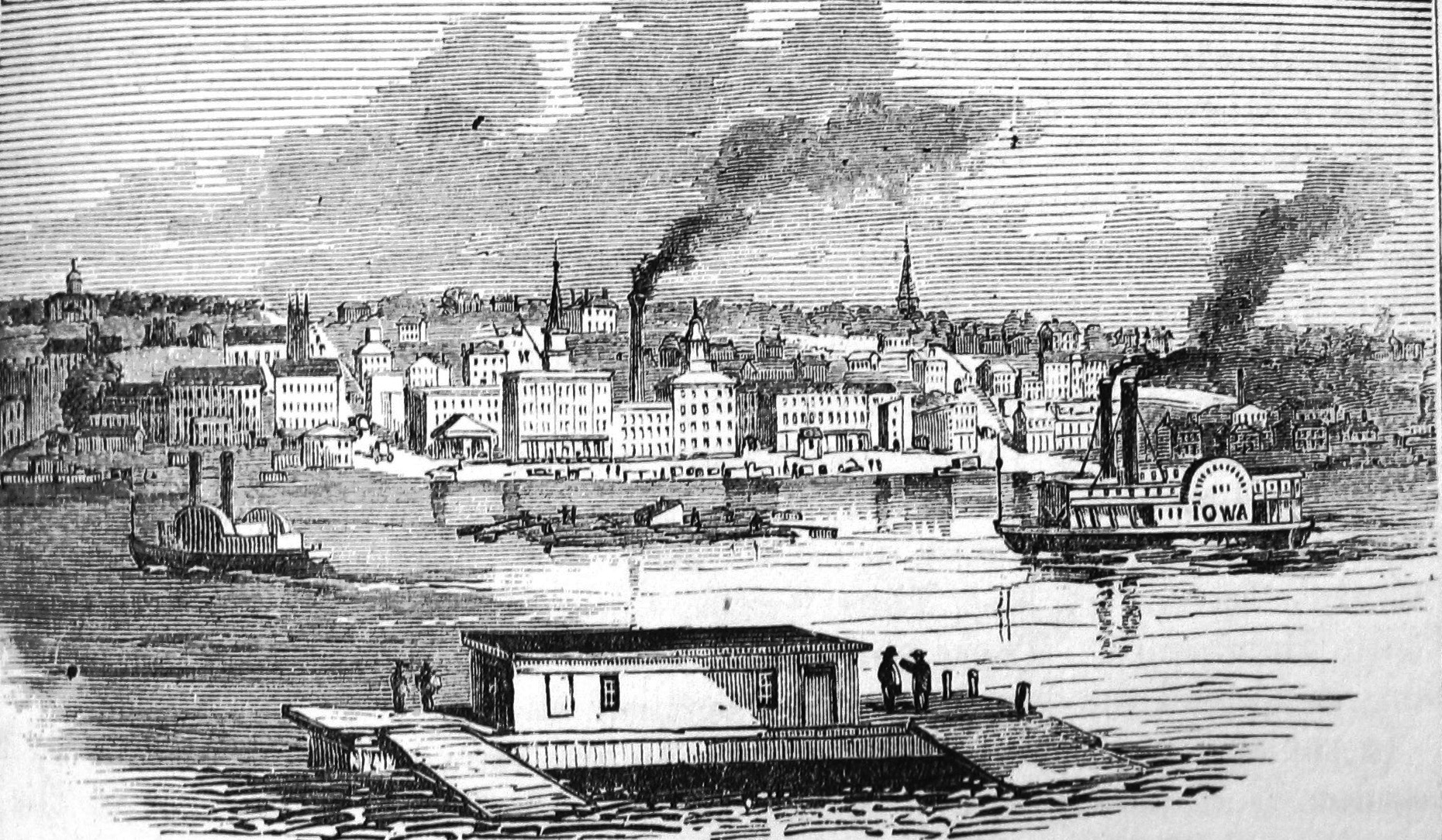
Davenport in 1865, facing north from Rock Island

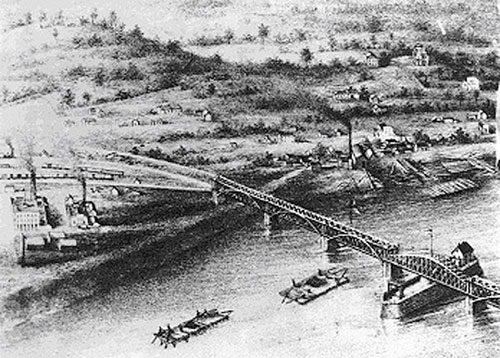
First bridge over the Mississippi River at Davenport

Colonel Davenport arrived in 1816 with the establishment of Fort Armstrong. He acted as a "sutler", or supplier, for the United States Army garrisoned at Fort Armstrong. Fort Armstrong was located on the northwestern tip of Arsenal Island with the purpose of monitoring fur trade traffic in the area and keeping the peace between local Native American tribes. He contributed to the organization and mapping out of the community, now known as the Quad Cities. He also aided in establishing plans for the first railroad bridge to cross the Mississippi. On July 4, 1845, Colonel Davenport was assaulted in his home by the Banditti of the Prairie men who thought he had a fortune in his safe. Beaten and left for dead, he survived long enough to give a full description of the criminals before he died that night. Five men were charged with the murder of George Davenport, and all but one, who escaped before the trial, were hung for the murder. Three more men were charged with accessories to the murder. One man was sentenced to life in prison but escaped and was killed three months later, one man served one year in prison, and the charges were dropped against the third man, who left the area.

On June 9, 1849, Maj. William Williams visited Davenport and provided a brief description in his journal:

Davenport is situated on the Iowa site of the river on a very extensive flat of land, gently rising from the River Mississippi for a mile back, when the bluff rises to considerable height affording most beautiful sites for improvements. This is a charming place; buildings good but in some part scattered; streets very wide and beautified with trees on each side; some very pretty residences; a great deal of taste displayed. We have a fine view of the river both up and down. The population is from 1,100 to 1,200. The town has the appearance of a more ancient town than any I have seen on the Mississippi... Davenport is the county seat of Scott county. Supports two lawyers, four doctors, has seven churches... No cholera here- a healthy place. ...Two large steam flouring mills that manufactures 620 barrels of flower per week, one steam saw mill. ...Eight or ten stores here, good ones, some groceries, 3 drug stores, one regular hotel- 2 doggeries... A very fine college [Iowa College] at Davenport under the direction of the Congregationalists; a very fine building, beautifully situated on the bluffs in rear of the town.

In the 1850s, Germans made up Davenport's largest settlement group. By 1858, more than one-fifth of Davenport's nearly 11,000 residents were Germans. Before a bridge was built, privately owned ferryboats transported passengers, wagons, and cargo across the Mississippi River. The growing city had a need for a railroad bridge to cross into Illinois. In 1856, the first railroad bridge was built across the Mississippi River, connecting Davenport and Rock Island, IL. It was built by the Rock Island Railroad. Steamboaters saw nationwide railroads as a threat to their business. On May 6, 1856, just weeks after it was completed, a steamboater crashed the Effie Afton steamboat into the bridge. The owner of the Effie Afton, John Hurd, filed a lawsuit against The Rock Island Railroad Company. The Rock Island Railroad Company selected Abraham Lincoln as their trial lawyer.

The case, "Hurd v. Rock Island Bridge Company" was argued by Lincoln in the U.S. Circuit Court in Chicago before Judge John MacLean, on September 8, 1857. The jury deliberated for a few hours and ended up as a hung jury so the case was dismissed. In 1858, the Committee on Commerce of the United States House of Representatives conducted an investigation to decide if the Rock Island Bridge was a serious obstruction to the navigation of the river. The committee concluded that the bridge was a hazard because of the length of the pier, the angle of the bridge, and the swift current under the bridge. The committee believed, however, that the courts should settle the matter and therefore did not recommend any action by the United States Congress. In May 1858, Ward filed suit in the United States District Court for the Southern District of Iowa asking the court to declare the bridge a nuisance and order its removal and restore the river to its original capacity for all purposes of navigation. The judge declared the bridge a nuisance and ordered the Mississippi and Missouri Railroad to remove the three piers and their superstructure that lay on the Iowa side. The judge reasoned that if this bridge was not stopped, many other bridges would follow. The piers were not torn out because the railroad company appealed the case to the United States Supreme Court. The Supreme Court later reversed the decision of the district court and allowed the bridge to remain.

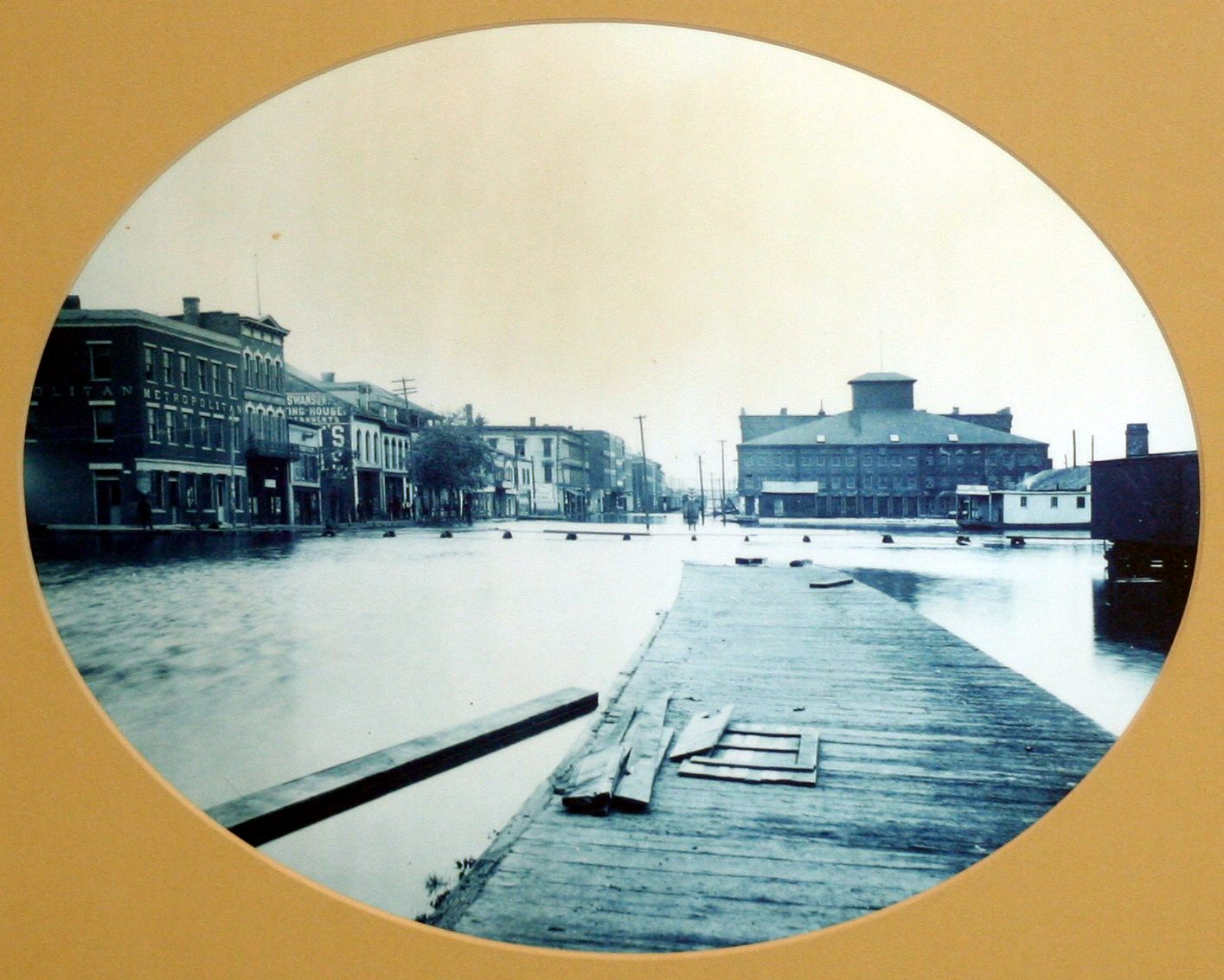
Front Street during high water (1888)

Just before the start of the Civil War, Governor Samuel J. Kirkwood declared Davenport to be Iowa's first military headquarters. Five camps were set up in Davenport during the war. Camp McClellan was the largest camp, located on the eastern edge of the city. Thousands of Iowa troops trained here. Camp McClellan contained twenty wooden barracks, a stockade building, headquarters buildings, and hospitals. A Davenport neighborhood, McClellan Heights is named after the camp. On February 11, 1861, a group of armed secessionists took Fort Armstrong and raised a Palmetto flag but soon left when they heard news that soldiers from Davenport were heading their way.

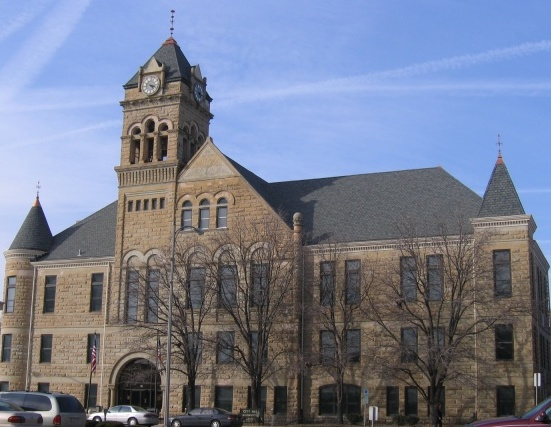
The Davenport City Hall was built in 1895 during a deep economic depression. Construction was completed without issuing bonds and was financed through taxes on illegal saloons and brothels.

Hundreds of Iowa children were left homeless by the Civil War. On November 16, 1865, the Iowa Soldiers' Orphans' Home (renamed the Annie Wittenmyer Home in 1949) was opened. The first 150 children arrived from Keokuk, Iowa. Starting in 1876, children from broken homes as well as orphans from all of Iowa's 99 counties were taken in at the home. The home was a self-contained community, containing residences, a school, a tailor shop, and a chapel. The home had three separate fires during its course. The first fire occurred in 1877 when the engine room of the laundry building ignited, destroying it and an adjoining school room. In 1880, the second fire destroyed the kitchen, bakery, and dining hall. On November 9, 1887, at three o’clock in the morning, the third fire was started when lightning struck the main building which housed staff and students. The lightning bolt went through the roof of the teacher's bedroom, who was then able to raise the alarm and evacuate everyone safely. The building burned to the ground. The next day’s Morning Democrat Gazette pointed out that if home was not set up with several different buildings as houses, all 350 children at the time would have been homeless and some may have not survived the fire. After 110 years of service, the home closed in 1975. It is estimated that well over 12,000 children were helped by the Home during its operation.

In 1872, Phebe Sudlow was appointed principal of Davenport High School. She was the first female principal in the United States. On June 19, 1874, Phebe Sudlow was then unanimously voted to the position of Superintendent of Davenport Schools. She was also the first woman in United States history to be a public school superintendent.

In 1895, in the midst of a deep national economic depression, Davenport built an ornate new City Hall. The cost was about $90,000 — an astronomical sum at that time — and the City constructed the new building without issuing any municipal bonds. Local legend has long suggested that the city retired the debt so quickly by taxing the city's brothels, but the fines levied against the brothels accounted for only between $7,000–$9,000 per year; just a portion of the financial windfall the city reaped in the mid-1890s. The bulk of the funds came from a new state law (the "mulct tax") which applied to the city's 150 illegal saloons and amounted to around $50,000 per year. This tax allowed for the construction of not only City Hall, but also paved streets and built a new sewer system. From 1902–08, the city eliminated its property taxes altogether.

In 1897, Palmer College of Chiropractic was founded by Daniel David Palmer. It is the first chiropractic school in the world.

== 20th century ==
=== Early 20th century ===
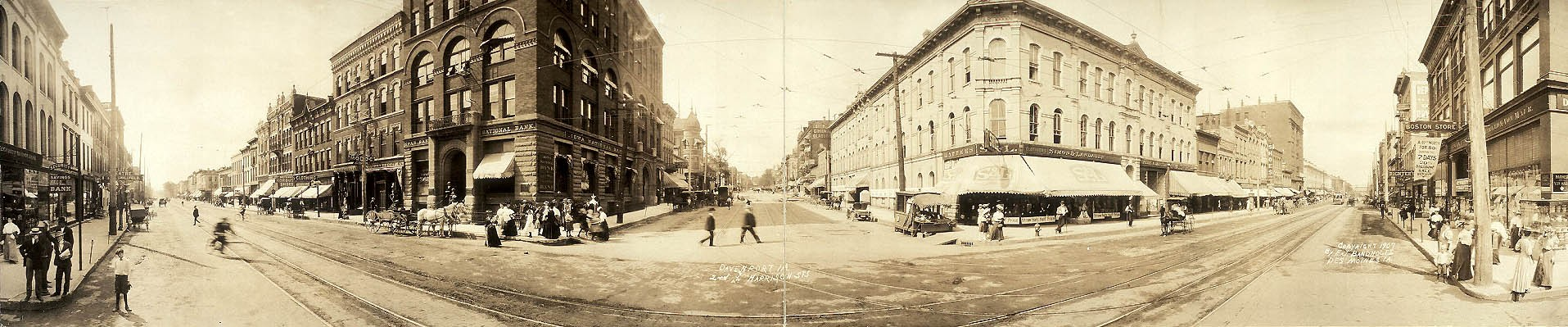
Panoramic view of Second and Harrison Streets, 1907

On July 25, 1901, a large fire erupted on Davenport's east side. The fire burnt itself out late in the day, instead of being brought under control. Eight blocks of buildings were destroyed causing $1,000,000 worth of damage. There were no deaths during the fire.

The 1920s brought an economic and building boom. The city's skyline began to form with the construction of commercial buildings like the Kahl Building and the Capitol Theatre, the Parker Building, and American Commercial and Savings Bank. Large national department stores also arrived downtown, such as Montgomery Ward, Sears, and J.C. Penney. The Blackhawk Hotel was built downtown in 1915. The original hotel was seven stories. Four floors were added in the 1920s, for a total of 400 rooms. The Blackhawk has been host to several high-profile people including Carl Sandburg, Herbert Hoover, Richard Nixon, and Jack Dempsey. The hotel named rooms 412–414 the "Nixon Suite". Big bands such as Guy Lombardo and Stan Kenton played at the Blackhawk on many occasions

On Christmas day in 1920, 10,000 people turned out to see the opening of Davenport's new, elegant theater, the Capitol Theatre. The Capitol Theatre featured a classical interior, an orchestra pit, and a full-scale theater organ. The third balcony extended five full stories. The theater's 2,000 seats were regularly filled. On February 18, 1922, WOC Radio made its local broadcasting debut. WOC was the second radio station licensed in the country. In 1933, WOC hired future President Ronald Reagan as a staff announcer.

In 1930, efforts began to turn a city dump into a landmark. The project was to construct a municipal stadium (now called Modern Woodmen Park). The project was financed by bonds and cost more than $150,000. Special features included reserved seats, box seats, and night lighting. The stadium was home to the Saint Ambrose University football games and boxing matches. Today the stadium is home to the Quad Cities River Bandits baseball team. By 1932, thousands of Davenporters were on public relief due to the Great Depression. A shantytown grew in the west end of the city along the Mississippi River. Sickness, hunger, and unsanitary living conditions plagued the area. Through county and municipal government, the federal Civil Works Administration employed thousands of men. They worked to extend the seawall along the riverfront and more than 200 jobs were created by the construction of Lock and Dam 15 project in 1932. Hundreds of state employees worked on completing the Kimberly Road Outerbelt Bypass in 1936.

=== Mid-Late 20th century ===
In 1946, Alcoa decided to build a new rolling mill east of Davenport in Riverdale, Iowa. With the construction, concerns about postwar unemployment ended. Retailing in Davenport was changed by the inclusion of the automobile into mainstream America. In the late 1940s, parking meters were installed in downtown to encourage rotation of space between different users. Soon there were more cars than the street parking spaces could handle. In 1953, the first multi-story ramp was completed in the state on the corner of Fifth Street and Brady Street. The large variety of shops kept downtown a retail leader even after the opening of the Village Shopping Center in 1956, which was another first for Iowa.

The deadliest fire in Davenport history came on January 7, 1950, when 41 people were killed in a fire at the St. Elizabeth's Hospital, a mental ward operated by Mercy Hospital. Most of the people who lost their lives were female patients trapped behind windows locked shut by rusty, iron bars. The cause was attributed to a patient who was lighting curtains on fire with a cigarette lighter.

Davenport experienced a post-war economic and population boom after World War II. Oscar Mayer, Ralston Purina, and other companies all built plants in west Davenport. 1956 brought the Interstate highway network to Davenport. Local transportation planning took on a new design after World War II. Paved state and federal highways built to and through Davenport in the 1930s were expanded to handle new truck shipping patterns. In 1960, a second span was constructed to help with the increased traffic on the Iowa-Illinois Memorial Bridge while the first segment of Interstate 80, between Iowa Highway 38 and U.S. Highway 61, opened later that year. A segment connecting U.S. 61 to U.S. 67 was completed in 1964, while other Interstate highways – 74 on the east and 280 on the west – also opened to traffic during the 1960s and early 1970s.

By 1959, more than 1,000 homes a year were being constructed. By the late 1970s, the economic growth was over for both downtown and local businesses and industries. The farm crisis of the 1980s hit Davenport and the rest of the Quad Cities hard, with high unemployment and financial hardships. 35,000 workers lost their jobs throughout the entire Quad Cities area. The Caterpillar Plant on the cities north side closed, causing many jobs to be lost.

In 1973, NorthPark Mall was built, drawing most customers away from downtown and leaving the area in its own economic depression. In the late 1970s, Davenport city leaders began plans to construct a civic center in downtown. The center would become a focus for the revitalization of downtown's sagging property values. In December 1983, following sixteen months of construction, the civic center was opened. After a public naming contest, it was named the RiverCenter a short time later. The adjacent Orpehum Theatre was renamed the "Adler Theater" and was placed under the management of the RiverCenter.

The 1990s brought the beginnings of an economic turnaround for the city. Many renovations and building additions have occurred to revitalize downtown, including fixing up Modern Woodmen Park, building the Skybridge, and constructing the Figge Art Museum along with many other projects.

== 21st century ==
Davenport (along with neighboring Rock Island, Illinois) won the "2007 City Livability Award" in the small-city category from the U.S. Conference of Mayors. Tom Cochran, Executive Director of the Conference, stated that the award "gives the Conference a chance to highlight mayoral leadership in making urban areas safer, cleaner, and more livable." The award acknowledges achievements from the "RiverVision" plan of Davenport and Rock Island.

On May 28, 2023, The Davenport, an apartment building located in the downtown of the city, partially collapsed, killing three people and seriously injuring another. The remaining building was demolished shortly after the collapse. The collapse resulted in legal action against the city.

== List of mayors of Davenport ==
- 1839 Rodolphus Bennet
- 1840 John H. Thorington
- 1841 Jonathan W. Parker
- 1842 Harvey Leonard
- 1843–1846 James Thorington
- 1847–1848 James Bowling
- 1849 Jonathan W. Parker
- 1850 James Hall
- 1851 Charles Weston
- 1852 John Jordan
- 1853 John A. Boyd
- 1854 James Grant
- 1855 Enos Tichenor
- 1856 Gilbert C.R. Mitchell
- 1857 George B. Sargent
- 1858–1859 Ebenezer Cook
- 1860 James B. Caldwell
- 1861–1862 George H. French
- 1863 John E. Henry
- 1864 Robert Lowry
- 1865–1866 John L. Davies
- 1867–1868 M. Donohue
- 1869 James Renwick
- 1870 J.M. Lyter
- 1871 John C. Bills
- 1872 A.H. Bennett
- 1873 J.H. Murphy
- 1874 J.W. Stewart
- 1875–1876 Roderick Rose
- 1877 Tristram Thomas Dow
- 1878 John W. Thompson
- 1879 Jerrie Murphy
- 1880 Roderick Rose
- 1881 John E. Henry
- 1882 John G. Bills
- 1883 John W. Thompson
- 1884–1889 Ernest Claussen
- 1890–1891 C.A. Ficke
- 1892 John C. Bills
- 1893–1896 Henry Vollmer
- 1897 S.F. Smith
- 1898–1899 George T. Baker
- 1900–1901 Fred Heinz
- 1902–1903 Waldo Backer
- 1903–1905 Harry W. Phillips
- 1906–1907 Waldo Becker
- 1908–1910 George W. Scott
- 1910–1916 Alfred C. Mueller
- 1916–1918 John Berwald
- 1918 C.M. Littleton (Partial Term, Not Qualified)
- 1918–1920 Lee J. Daugherty
- 1920–1922 Charles Lawrence Barewold
- 1922–1924 Alfred Muller (sic)
- 1924–1928 Louis Roddewig
- 1928–1930 Harold Metcalf
- 1930–1934 George Tank
- 1934–1938 Merle Wells
- 1938–1942 John Jebens (Died in Office, March 8, 1942)
- 1942–1944 Edwin Frick
- 1944–1954 Arthur Kroppoch
- 1954–1957 Walter Beuse (Died in Office, August 26, 1957)
- 1957–1961 Donato (Don) Petruccelli
- 1961–1966 Ray T. O'Brien
- 1966–1971 John H. Jebens
- 1971–1975 Kathryn Kirschbaum
- 1975–1977 Robert Duax
- 1977–1981 Charles Wright
- 1982–1986 Charles Peart
- 1986–1991 Thomas Hart
- 1992–1998 Patrick Gibbs
- 1998–2002 Phil Yerington
- 2002–2006 Charlie Brooke
- 2006–2008 Ed Winborn
- 2008–2016 Bill Gluba
- 2016–2020 Frank Klipsch
- 2020–2026 Mike Matson
- 2026–present Jason Gordon

== See also ==
- Antoine LeClaire House
- Bucktown, Iowa
- African Americans in Davenport, Iowa
