= J. Monroe Parker–Ficke House =

Historic house in Davenport, Iowa, US

- U.S. Historic district – Contributing property
- Davenport Register of Historic Properties
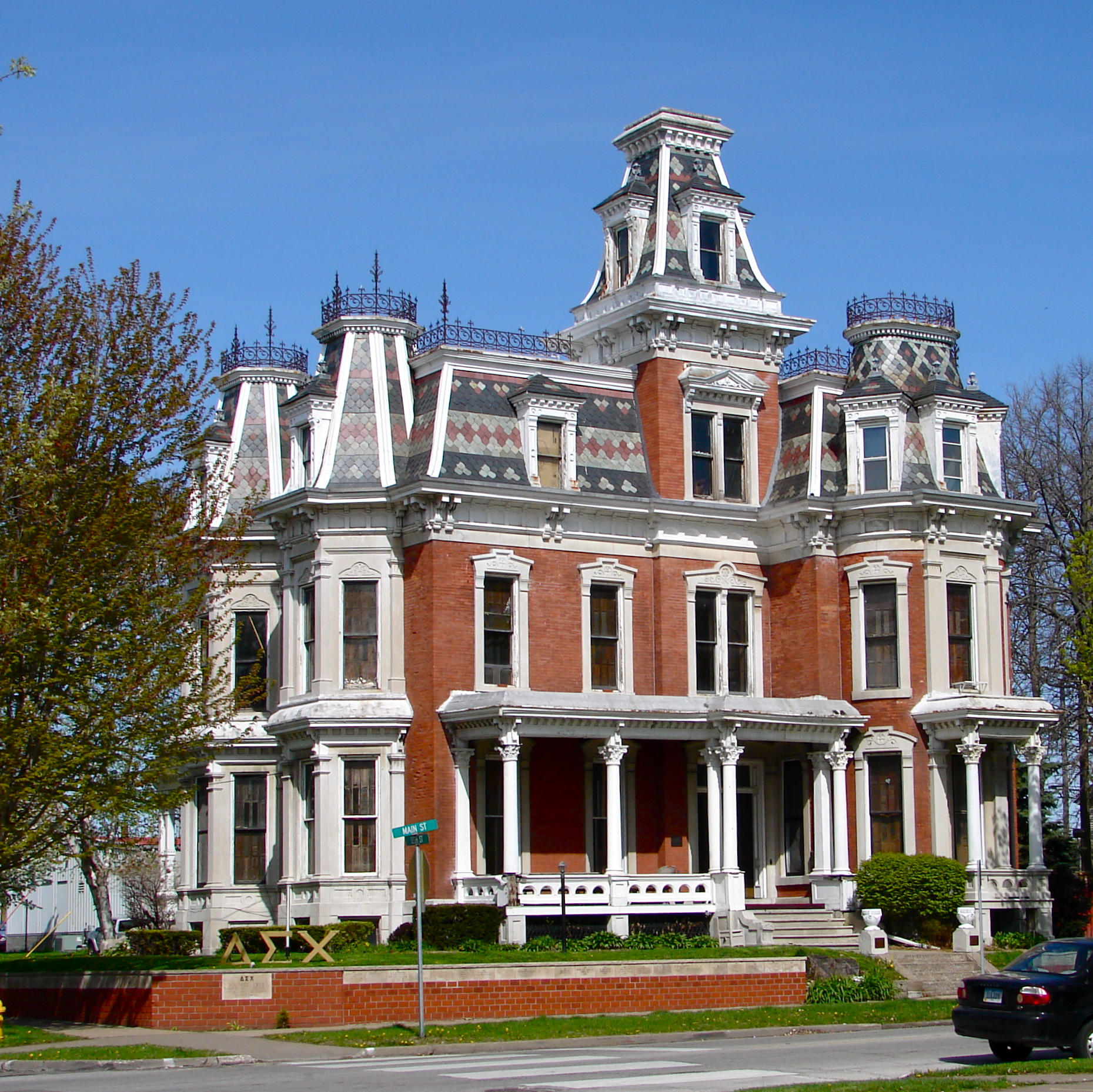

- Location within Iowa Location within the United States
- Location: 1208 Main St. Davenport, Iowa
- Coordinates: 41°31′55″N 90°34′33″W
- Area: less than one acre
- Built: 1881
- Architect: T. W. McClelland; Victor Huot
- Architectural style: Second Empire
- Part of: College Square Historic District (ID83003628)
- MPS: Davenport MRA
- DRHP No.: 42

Significant dates
- Added to NRHP: November 18, 1983
- Designated DRHP: June 4, 2003

The J. Monroe Parker–Ficke House is a historic building located in the College Square Historic District in Davenport, Iowa, United States. The district was added to the National Register of Historic Places in 1983. The house was individually listed on the Davenport Register of Historic Properties in 2003. It has been owned and occupied by the Alpha chapter of Delta Sigma Chi since 1978.

== History ==
The house was built in 1881 by James Monroe Parker, a wealthy Davenport financier. It was designed and built by Davenport's prominent 19th-century builder T. W. McClelland. However, it is possible that Benjamin W. Gartside, who was an architect with the McClelland firm at the time, may be the actual designer. Davenport architect and builder Victor Huot is responsible for the slate roof. Since 1978 the building has served as a fraternity house for Delta Sigma Chi from the Palmer College of Chiropractic. Huot and McClelland were close friends and "Davenport's pioneer builders and architects."

== C. A. Ficke ==
The house is associated with Charles August Ficke (1850-1931), who was a prominent Davenport attorney, politician, and developer. Born in Beitzenburg, then in the Duchy of Mecklenburg, Ficke moved to Davenport as a young child in 1851. He became a lawyer in 1877 after reading in H.R. Claussen's office and formal study. Like many people of German heritage between 1860 and 1885 he changed his political party affiliation from Republican to the Democratic Party. In 1886, he was elected as the first Scott County attorney and then as Mayor of Davenport from 1890 to 1891. While he was mayor the city established the Public Works Department and LeClaire Park. Improved public works during his mayoral administration included street paving and sewer construction. He was the first mayor to veto an ordinance passed by the city council. Ficke is also connected with several projects in downtown Davenport, including the Ficke Block, which is also listed on the National Register of Historic Places. His art collection was the nucleus that started the Davenport Museum of Art that is now housed in the Figge Art Museum. Ficke's son, Arthur Davison Ficke, lived in the home during the latter half of his childhood before establishing himself as a nationally known poet.

== Architecture ==
The two-story brick house follows an irregular plan. It features a mansard roof, multicolor slate shingles, wrought-iron roof cresting, brackets, moldings, and fanciful window surrounds. The house is beautifully composed and well executed. It is the ultimate expression of Victorian excess, and it is considered one of the finest examples of Second Empire construction in the state of Iowa.
