= Bucktown, Davenport =

- Historic neighborhood
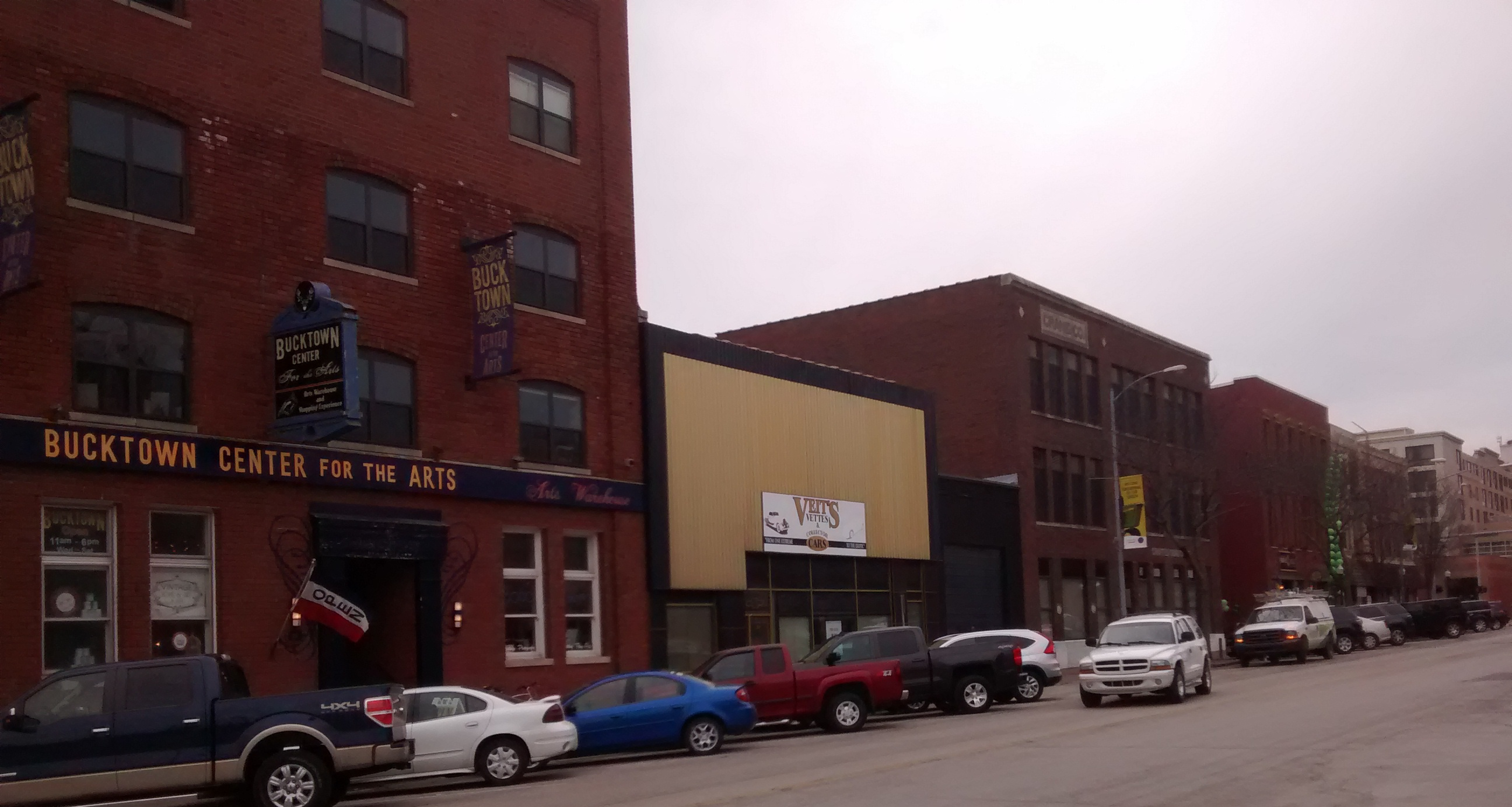
- A street in Bucktown, including the Bucktown Center for the Arts.

- Location in Iowa
- Coordinates: 41.521°N 90.572°W
- Country: United States
- State: Iowa
- City: Davenport

Bucktown is a historic area in the eastern end of downtown Davenport, Iowa, along the Mississippi River. Settled by many German immigrants, it was known in the early 20th century during the Prohibition era for its numerous speakeasies. Bucktown garnered national media headlines as a red-light district and the "wickedest city in America."

== Low culture ==
Bucktown was an area of the city dominated at night by crews and passengers from river boats. It was also settled by many German immigrants, who brought their customs of family entertainment at beer gardens. At the same time, this area attracted "adult" entertainments. Its racy reputation was based on its dance halls, saloons, and German music pavilions. Some 42 brothels were documented in a two-block area.

Jazz and other music of the people was played by the era's finest musicians, including Louis Armstrong from New Orleans and the legendary Bix Beiderbecke.

== High culture ==
Bucktown was also known for its high culture. It was a destination for waves of German immigrants after the Revolutions of 1848. Their customs formed part of the identity of Bucktown and its infusion of the arts into the everyday. Art and music, for the common man, was central to the German way of life.

In 1856, immigrants formed the German Strasser Union Marching Band of Davenport. When the Tri City Symphony Orchestra was founded in 1916, it was the twelfth in the nation. As two-thirds of its membership was drawn from the Strasser Marching Band, some scholars believe the orchestra should be considered the oldest music organization in the country. Davenport was built on the arts. Before there were paved streets and running water to homes in the city, there were opera houses with 40-foot domed ceilings. These were destinations for operatic troupes from Chicago who traveled on horseback to perform.

The most famous of these was the Burtis Opera House, which still stands on the north side of the Bucktown District. Davenport was home to the nation's first municipal art gallery formed in 1925 by German Charles Ficke, the founder of the Davenport Museum of Art, now known as the Figge Art Museum.

== See also ==
- History of Davenport, Iowa

== Bibliography ==
- Anderson, Frederick I.; Tweet, Roald D.; McDonald, E. Lawrence (1982). Quad cities: joined by a river. Lee Enterprises. ISBN 9780910847001.
- Johnson, Rich; Speer, Mary Louise; Willard, John (2000). Davenport: Jewel of the Mississippi. Arcadia Publishing. ISBN 9780738507286.
- Lee, Bill; Lee, William F. (1984). People in Jazz: Jazz Keyboard Improvisors of the 19th & 20th Centuries : Preragtime, Blues, Folk and Minstrel, Early Ragtime, Dixieland, Ragtime-stride, Blues-boogie, Swing, Prebop, Bop ... Columbia Lady Music. ISBN 9780898983586.
- Roba, William (2004). German-Iowan Studies: Selected Essays. Peter Lang. ISBN 9780820452876.
- Wood, Sharon E. (2006). The Freedom of the Streets: Work, Citizenship, and Sexuality in a Gilded Age City. Univ of North Carolina Press. ISBN 9780807876534.
- Turner, Jonathan (2016). A Brief History of Bucktown: Davenport's Infamous District Transformed. Arcadia Publishing. ISBN 9781626199095.
