= Justino Fernández =

Mexican researcher and historian (1904–1972)

Justino Fernández García (September 28, 1904 – December 12, 1972) was a researcher, historian and art critic who is particularly known for his work documenting and critiquing Mexican art of the 20th century. Fernandez studied and developed his career with the National Autonomous University of Mexico, as a protégé of Manuel Toussaint. Then the latter died in 1955, Fernandez took over as head of the Aesthetic Research Institute at UNAM, where he would develop the most of his writing and research until his death. Fernandez’s work was recognized by the Mexican government with the Premio Nacional de Ciencias y Artes in 1969.

== Life ==
Fernandez was born on September 28, 1904, in Mexico City. He was the grandson of the jurist Alonso Tomás Fernández Pérez, a magistrate in the supreme court, and Doña María de los Dolores Mondoño y Fernández. Son of Justino Fernandez Mondoño, originally from Mexico City, who served as a member of the Mexican Constituent Congress which wrote the 1857 Constitution of Mexico. His mother was Sergia Garcia a native of Valladolid, Spain, and his father's second wife. His nephew, Justino Reyes Retana Fernández, served in the Mexican Airforce with the 201st Fighter Squadron during World War II.

He began school at the Colegio Francés de la Perpetua, but in 1910, he was sent to the United States to avoid the Mexican Revolution. He returned to Mexico in 1923, at the time when the Mexican muralism movement was being established.

He did all of his undergraduate and graduate work at the National Autonomous University of Mexico (UNAM). As an undergrad, he studied under José Gaos and Juan David García Bacca, who introduced him to German philosophy and that of José Ortega y Gasset. He earned his master's degree in 1953 and his doctorate the following year with a thesis entitled “Coatlicue: estética de arte indígena antiguo” (Coatlicue, the aesthetics of ancient indigenous art) .

Before he was established as a writer and researcher, he had a number of jobs to make ends meet, including working as an assistant of an architect.

Fernandez died in Mexico City on December 12, 1972.

== Career ==
He was a writer, historian, critic, philosopher and researcher.

While still a student, in 1932 he founded the Editorial Alcancía publishing concern with Juan O'Gorman which operated until 1959.

As a graduate student, he was a protégé of well-known researcher, historian and critic Manuel Toussaint, becoming his assistant when he founded the Aesthetic Research Institute at UNAM in 1936. The following year he began teaching summer classes at the university in art history.

He remained with this institution until his death, and concentrated most of his research and art criticism here. In this way, he continued the work of his mentor, Toussaint.

Influenced by positivism, he is best known as a specialist in modern (20th century) Mexican art, in both its documentation and interpretation, relating it to art movements in the rest of the world. He particularly wrote about Mexican muralism, especially the work of José Clemente Orozco . However, he also did research work in both colonial period and 19th century Mexican art, writing an important work on the Altar of the Kings at the Mexico City Cathedral and studied the work of José María Velasco .

When Toussaint died in 1955, Fernandez became the interim director of the Aesthetic Research Institute with the position becoming permanent the following year. He remained as such until 1968. In 1969 UNAM named him a researcher emeritus. From 1970 to 1972, he served as member of the governing board of UNAM.

Other important associations included being a member of the Academia Mexicana de la Historia (as liaison to the Academia Real in Madrid) in 1965 and was a founding member of the Academia de Artes .

His highest award was the Premio Nacional de Ciencias y Artes from the Mexican government in 1969. Publications about the writer include: Homenaje a Justino Fernández en sus 60 años, Del arte. Homenaje a Justino Fernández and Bibliografía sobre arte colonial de Justino Fernández.

== Major publications ==
- Recuerdo de Tasco (1934)
- Morelia (1936).
- Pátzcuaro (1936).
- Uruapan (1936).
- El arte moderno en México (1937).
- La danza de los Concheros de San Miguel Allende (with Vicente T. Mendoza, 1941)
- Orozco: forma e idea (1942).
- Prometeo: ensayo sobre pintura contemporánea; Gauguin, Matisse, Rousseau, Cézanne, Braque, Picasso, Dada, Breton, Dalí, Rivera, Orozco (1945).
- Arte moderno y contemporáneo de México (1952).
- Coatlicue: estética del arte indígena antiguo (1954).
- El retablo de los reyes: estética del arte de la Nueva España (1959).
- El hombre: estética del arte moderno y contemporáneo (1962).
- Miguel Ángel: de su alma (1964).
- El arte del siglo XIX en México (1967).
- Mexican Art (1967)
- Pedro Coronel, pintor y escultor (1971).
- Estética del arte mexicano (1972).
- Arte mexicano: de sus orígenes a nuestros días (1958, republished in 1975).
