= Marjorie Allen Seiffert =

American poet

Marjorie Allen Seiffert (February 15, 1885 – January 1, 1970) was an American poet and winner of the 1919 Levinson Prize for Poetry. She used several pseudonyms over the course of her career, including Angela Cypher for some of her lighter verse and Elijah Hay for poems she wrote as part of the Spectrist hoax.

== Family and Education ==
Marjorie Allen was born in Moline, Illinois to Minnie Florence (Stephens) Allen, whose father was president of the Moline Plow Company, and Frank Gates Allen, a well-to-do businessman. She graduated from Smith College in 1906 and then returned to her hometown. In 1910, she married Otto Seiffert, and they had two children, Allen and Helen. She added her husband's family name of Seiffert to her own name.

== Career ==
Seiffert began writing verse around 1915, with encouragement from her friend and fellow poet Arthur Davison Ficke. Over the course of her career, she published dozens of poems in The New Yorker, Others: A Magazine of the New Verse, Poetry, and other magazines. In 1919 she won Poetry's Levinson Prize for the best American poem of the year.

By the early 1930s, she began to have trouble getting her work published. Around this time, she created a pseudonym, 'Angela Cypher', under which she wrote a form of light verse that gave her latitude for barbed observations about women's lives. She chose the name Cypher in part because it was a near homophone with her own last name. The Cypher poems were a hit with the editors of The New Yorker, which published around a dozen of them in the 1930s.

Her work has since been anthologized in such volumes as William Roetzhelm's Giant Book of Poetry (2006).

Her papers are held by the University of Colorado at Boulder Libraries. They include some unpublished short stories written under yet another pseudonym, 'Lucy Lockett'.

=== Spectrism ===
In 1916 Arthur Davison Ficke and the poet Witter Bynner published Spectra: New Poems under the pseudonyms ‘Anne Knish’ (Ficke) and ‘Emanuel Morgan’ (Bynner). They claimed these poems as experiments in a new style of poetry that they dubbed the Spectric School of Poetry, informally known as Spectrism. Their actual intent was to challenge the reigning aesthetic of Imagism by creating a fake poetry movement that the experts would take seriously. The sometimes nonsensical poems received a mixed reaction, and there was extensive speculation on the true authorship of the poetry.

In the fall of 1916, a third Spectrist poet emerged, 'Elijah Hay', who was actually Seiffert writing under a pseudonym. She had been invited in on the hoax by Bynner and Ficke, who felt they needed to broaden the circle of poets producing in the Spectrist style. Under the male pseudonym, Seiffert wove satirical observations about women's lives into many of her Spectrist poems. It has been observed that her poems added "diversity and ingenuity" to the range of Spectric poetry.

An entire issue of Others magazine was devoted to Spectrist poetry, including work by Hay/Seiffert such as the poem "Night".

Spectrism came to an end in 1918 when Bynner confessed to being Morgan. In the aftermath, a number of critics who had earlier preferred Hay's verse to that of Morgan and Knish reversed their opinions on discovering the poet was a woman, and Hay/Seiffert's role in the Spectra affair has generally been diminished in subsequent accounts.

== Books ==
- A Woman of Thirty (Knopf, 1919). With 'Elijah Hay'.
- Ballads of the Singing Bowl (Scribner, 1927)
- The King with Three Faces and Other Poems (Scribner, 1929)
- The Name of Life (Scribner, 1938)
