= Gibbons Ruark =

American poet (1941–2025)

Ruark

Henry Gibbons Ruark (December 10, 1941 – October 19, 2025) was a contemporary American poet. Known for his deeply personal, often elegiac lyrics about his native North Carolina and beloved Ireland, Ruark had poetry in such publications as The New Yorker, The New Republic, and Poetry. His collections include Rescue the Perishing, Small Rain, Keeping Company, Reeds, A Program for Survival, Passing Through Customs: New and Selected Poems, Staying Blue, and, The Road to Ballyvaughan. He won numerous awards, including three Poetry Fellowships from the National Endowment for the Arts, residencies at the Tyrone Guthrie Centre in Ireland and a Pushcart Prize.

== Early years ==
Gibbons Ruark was born in Raleigh, North Carolina, on December 10, 1941, the son of a Methodist minister. When he was nine years old, his mother was hospitalized with a severe case of Polio, an incident which he writes about in several poems. He was brought up in various towns in North Carolina and in 1963 graduated from the University of North Carolina. That same year, he moved to Amherst, Massachusetts, where he and his wife Kay were married on October 5. Initially working as a bus boy in at the Lord Jeffrey Inn, he eventually earned a master's degree from the University of Massachusetts. While a student there, he took a poetry workshop with Joseph Langland and became friends with the poets Michael Heffernan and Robert Francis.

== University of Delaware ==
Having begun to publish poems in the mid-1960s, Ruark was hired at the University of Delaware in 1968 to replace the poet Robert Huff, who had departed the previous year. It was at Delaware that Ruark first met James Wright, the Pulitzer Prize–winning Ohio poet. On the publication of Ruark's Reeds, James Wright remarked that he considered Ruark "one of the finest poets now writing in English." Ruark's poetry continues to be compared to Wright's. The two remained close friends until Wright's death in 1980. In addition to Wright, Ruark became well acquainted with a number of other distinguished poets at the University of Delaware, such as W.D. Snodgrass who taught there until 1995.

== Poetry ==
Ruark's first book of poetry A Program for Survival was published in 1971 and received warm critical reviews. In the mid-1970s, Ruark lived for a year in Italy, which provided him with material for many of the poems in his next two books, Reeds in 1978 and Keeping Company in 1983. In 1976, Ruark met the Irish novelist Benedict Kiely who was visiting the University of Delaware for a term. In 1978 he visited Ireland for the first time. He returned to Ireland many times and was welcomed not only by his friend Kiely but also by the Nobel Prize–winning Irish poet Seamus Heaney and other Irish writers. The influence of Ireland can be seen in much of Ruark's poetry in the late 1980s and Irish subject matter is especially prevalent in many of the poems in his 1991 Rescue the Perishing. In the 1990s Ruark continued to write and teach at the University of Delaware. Passing Through Customs an edition of his new and selected poems was published in 1999.

=== Later years ===
Ruark's poetry was selected to appear in a number of anthologies. His poem "A Vacant Lot" appeared in The Pushcart Book of Poetry: The Best Poems from 30 Years of the Pushcart Prize. Five of his poems appeared in The Book of Irish American Poetry, From the 18th Century to the Present and two appeared in From the Other World: Poems in Memory of James Wright. Ruark retired from the University of Delaware in 2006, returning to Raleigh, North Carolina, with his wife Kay. In 2008 his book Staying Blue appeared from Lost Hills Books in Duluth, Minnesota. He died on October 19, 2025, of kidney disease.

== Bibliography ==
=== Collections ===
- A Program for Survival. Charlottseville: University of Virginia Press, 1971.
- Reeds. Lubbock: Texas Tech Press, 1978.
- Keeping Company. Baltimore: Johns Hopkins University Press, 1983.
- Small Rain. New York: Center for Edition Works, 1984.
- Forms of Retrieval. Kutztown: Kutztown University English Department, 1989.
- Rescue the Perishing. Baton Rouge: LSU Press, 1991.
- Passing Through Customs: New and Selected Poems. Baton Rouge: LSU Press, 1999.
- Staying Blue Duluth, Minnesota: Lost Hills Books, 2008.
- The Road To Ballyvaughan. Durham, North Carolina: Jacar Press, 2015.

=== List of poems ===
| Title | Year | First published | Reprinted/collected |
|---|---|---|---|
| Lightness in age | 2013 | Ruark, Gibbons (March 18, 2013). "Lightness in age". The New Yorker. Vol. 89, no. 5. p. 41. | |
