= Charles August Ficke =

American lawyer, politician

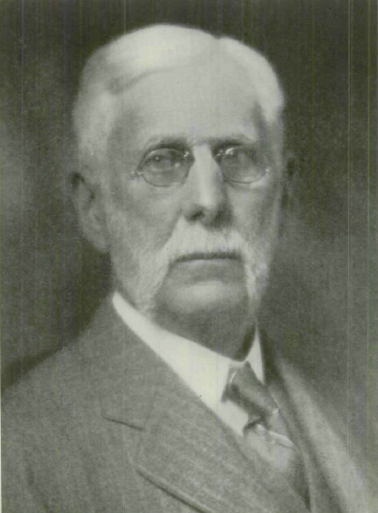
- Born: 1850; Boitzenburg, Kingdom of Prussia
- Died: 1931 (aged 80–81); Davenport, Iowa, US
- Spouse: Fannie Davison
- Children: Arthur Davison Ficke, Alice Ficke Simonsen, and Helene Ficke Watzek

Charles A. Ficke (1850-1931) was a Kingdom of Prussia-born American lawyer, politician, author, and art collector. He served two terms as the mayor of Davenport, Iowa. Ficke made significant contributions to a number of cultural institutions in Iowa during his life and after his death. He was the father of poet and artist Arthur Davison Ficke.

== Biography ==
Charles A. Ficke was born in Boitzenburg, Kingdom of Prussia on April 21, 1850. His parents, along with their eight children, emigrated to Scott County, Iowa when he was two years old. His parents were successful farmers throughout the late 19th century.

In the 1860s, Charles Ficke began working his way through various business positions in Davenport. He worked as a salesman, in insurance, and eventually as a lawyer. He became active in the Scott County Republican Party and gained popularity among the many other German American emigrants in the area. Charles Ficke married Fannie Davison in 1882. Their children include Arthur Davison Ficke, Alice Ficke Simonsen, and Helene Ficke Watzek.

As he gained business and political success, Ficke began collecting art. In 1890, he was elected to the first of his two terms as mayor of Davenport, Iowa. He was also the president of the Davenport Turner Society around this time.

== Charles August Ficke Collection ==
In 1886, 1892, 1901, 1902, and 1903, Charles Ficke and Fannie Davison made trips to Mexico, collecting art and rare books along the way. They consulted Professor Leandro Izaguirre when making some of the purchases. He also made multiple trips to Europe and collected art there as well, mostly old master prints.

Beginning in 1920 and continuing until his death in 1931, Ficke and his family distributed the collection to cultural institutions in Iowa. His art collection of 334 European and Mexican paintings was the founding donation for the Davenport Municipal Art Gallery. The gallery was established with state legislation after the donation. It was the precursor for the current Figge Art Museum. His books were donated to the Davenport Public Library.

In 1943, Manuel Toussaint, a notable Mexican art historian and author, traveled to Davenport to assess Ficke's collection of Colonial Mexican painting. He called it one of the most important in an American institution and published his findings.

== Links ==
- Figge Art Museum's Mexican Colonial Art Collection
- J. Monroe Parker–Ficke House
