= Idella Purnell =

American poet (1901–1982)

Idella Purnell (April 1, 1901 – December 1, 1982) (also known as Idella Purnell Stone and Ikey Stone) was a Mexican academic, librarian, teacher, and children's book author.

== Biography ==
She was born in Guadalajara, Mexico, to the dentist George Edward Purnell and his wife Idella. She became a teacher in the primary schools of Guadalajara at a very early age, in 1915. She studied at the University of California, Berkeley, where the poet Witter Bynner was one of her teachers and she served as an associate editor of the literary magazine The Occident. After graduating from the university in 1922, she returned to Guadalajara and became a secretary in the American Consulate there, continuing in that position through 1924. In 1923, she started the poetry magazine Palms, which she continued to publish until 1930. In 1925, she served as the head of the foreign book department at the Los Angeles Public Library. She moved to Aberdeen, Washington for a short time and then returned to Guadalajara. In 1932, she served as the dean and organizer of the first summer session at the University of Guadalajara. Beginning in 1935, she opened a gold mine at Ameca, Mexico, remaining there through 1937. She also began publishing fiction at about this time. Beginning in 1938, she taught creative writing in Los Angeles. During World War II, she was a riveter for Douglas Aviation and Fletcher Aviation. In 1957, she became a practitioner of Scientology, and remained one through 1966, serving briefly as the director of the Center for Dianetics and Scientology in Pasadena, California. She died in Los Angeles in 1982.

== Marriages and children ==
In 1927 she married John M. Weatherwax; they divorced about 1930. She married Remington Stone on September 10, 1932. She had two children with him, Marijane Stone (born 1934) and Remington P.S. Stone (born 1938), and they brought up her niece Carrie Purnell (born 1945).

== Awards ==
Her book The Merry Frogs was named a Julia Ellsworth Ford Foundation Book in 1936. She also received a diploma from the Second Mexican Congress for the Fine Arts and Humanities.

== Publications ==
- The Talking Bird: An Aztec Story Book (with John M. Weatherwax), 1930
- Tales Told to Little Paco by His Grandfather, 1930.
- Why the Bee Is Busy, and Other Rumanian Fairy Tales: Told to Little Marcu by Baba Maritz (with John M. Weatherwax), 1930.
- The Wishing Owl: A Maya Storybook, 1931.
- Little Yusuf: The Story of a Syrian Boy, Macmillan, 1931.
- The Lost Princess of Yucatán, Holt, 1931.
- The Forbidden City, Macmillan, 1932.
- (contributor) Gringa, edited by Emma Lindsay-Squier, Houghton, 1934.
- Pedro the Potter, Thomas Nelson, 1935.
- The Merry Frogs, Suttonhouse, 1936.
- (adapter) Felix Salten's Bambi, Health, 1944.
- (contributor) Journey with Genius: Recollections and Reflections Concerning D. H. Lawrence, John Day, 1951.
- Luther Burbank: El Mago de las Plantas, Espasa Calpe (Argentina), 1955.
- (contributor), D. H. Lawrence:A Composite Biography, edited by Edward H. Nehls, three volumes, University of Wisconsin Press, 1957-1959.
- (editor, as Idella Purnell Stone) Fourteen Great Tales of ESP, Gold Medal Books, 1969.
- (editor, as Idella Purnell Stone) Never In This World: 12 Famous Science-Fiction Writers, in Rare and Whimsical Moods, Fawcett, 1971.
- Thirty Mexican Menus in Spanish and English, Ritchie, 1971.
