= Witter Bynner =

American author (1881–1968)

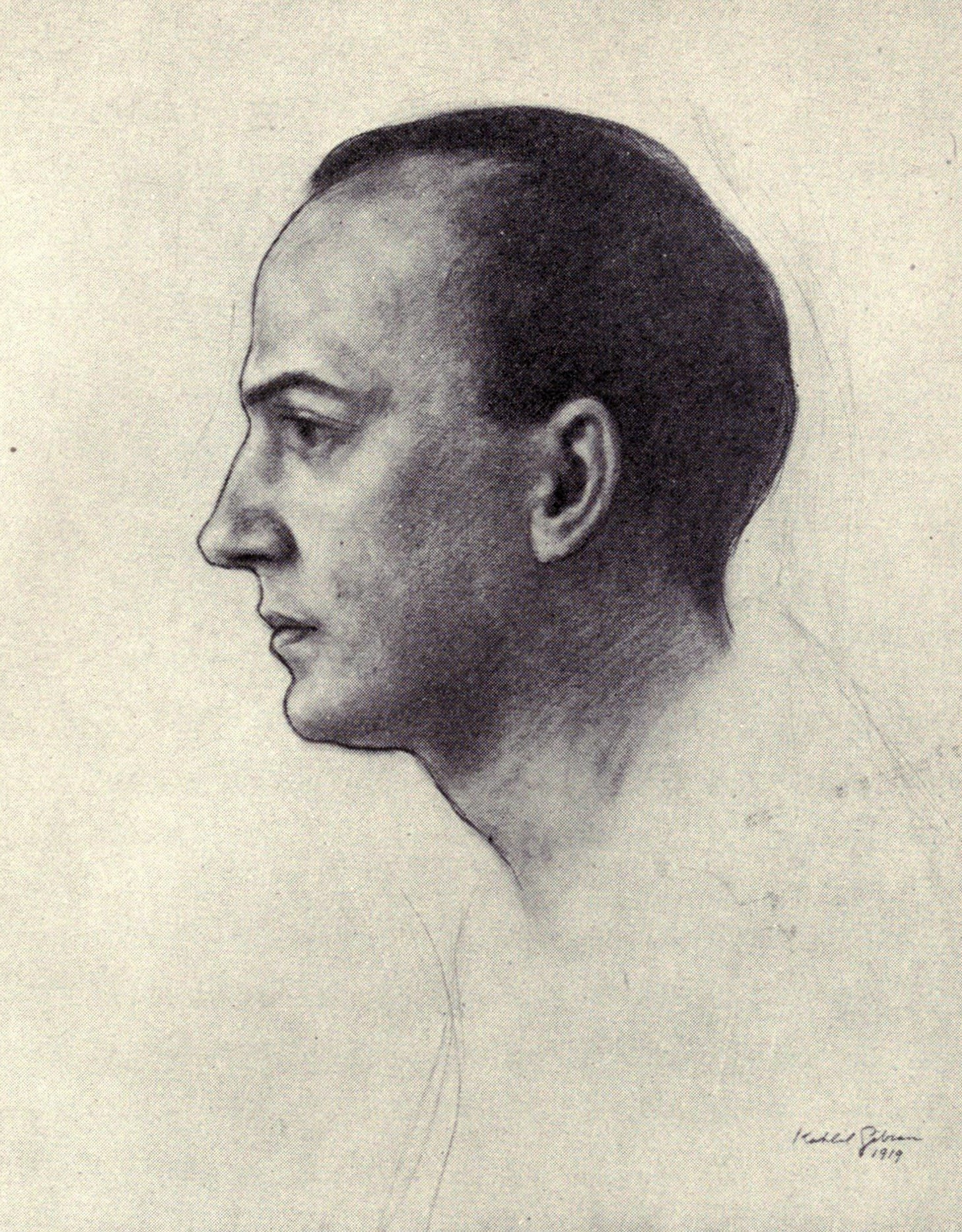
- A 1919 portrait drawing of Bynner by Kahlil Gibran
- Born: August 10, 1881; New York City, U.S.
- Died: June 1, 1968 (aged 86); Santa Fe, New Mexico, U.S.
- Occupations: Poet, translator
- Partner: Robert Hunt

Harold Witter Bynner (August 10, 1881 – June 1, 1968), also known by the pen name Emanuel Morgan, was an American poet and translator. He was known for his long residence in Santa Fe, New Mexico, and association with other literary figures there.

== Early life and education ==
Bynner was born in Brooklyn, New York, the son of Thomas Edgarton Bynner and the former Annie Louise Brewer. His domineering mother separated from his alcoholic father in December 1888 and moved with her two sons to Connecticut. The father died in 1891, and in 1892 the family moved to Brookline, Massachusetts. Bynner attended Brookline High School and was editor of its literary magazine. He entered Harvard University in 1898, where he was the first member of his class invited to join the student literary magazine, The Harvard Advocate, by its editor Wallace Stevens. He was also published in another of Harvard's literary journals, The Harvard Monthly. His favorite professor was George Santayana. While a student he took on the nickname "Hal" by which his friends would know him for the rest of his life. He enjoyed theater, opera, and symphony performances in Boston, and he became involved in the suffrage movement. He graduated from Harvard with honors in 1902. His first book of poems, An Ode to Harvard (later changed to Young Harvard), came out in 1907. In 1911 he was the Harvard Phi Beta Kappa Poet.

== New York and New Hampshire ==
After a trip to Europe, he took a position at McClure's Magazine and worked there for four years. He had an opportunity to meet and socialize with many New York writers and artists. He next turned to independent writing and lecturing, living in Cornish, New Hampshire. Bynner was involved with women's suffrage in New Hampshire, speaking at conventions and joining the state suffrage organization.

In 1916 he and Arthur Davison Ficke, a friend from Harvard, were among the perpetrators of an elaborate literary hoax. They created a purported "Spectrist" school of poets, along the lines of the Imagists, but based in Pittsburgh. Spectra, a slim collection, was published under the pseudonyms of Anne Knish (Ficke) and Emanuel Morgan (Bynner). Marjorie Allen Seiffert, writing as Elijah Hay, was also part of the "movement".

Bynner was friendly with Kahlil Gibran and introduced the writer to his publisher, Alfred A. Knopf. The latter published Gibran's The Prophet in 1923, which has had a long popularity. Gibran drew a portrait of Bynner in 1919.

In New York City, Bynner was a member of The Players club, the Harvard Club, and the MacDowell Club. In San Francisco, he joined the Bohemian Club.

== Asia and Berkeley ==
Bynner traveled with Ficke and others to Japan, Korea, and China in 1917.

He had a short spell in academia in 1918–1919 at the University of California, Berkeley. He was hired to teach Oral English to the Students' Army Training Corps as a form of conscientious objector alternative service. After World War I ended, Bynner was invited to stay on in the English department to teach poetry. His students included several who became published poets of some note, such as Stanton A. Coblentz, Hildegarde Flanner, Idella Purnell, and Genevieve Taggard. In celebration of the end of the war, he composed A Canticle of Praise, performed in the Hearst Greek Theatre before some 8,000 people.

At Berkeley he met Kiang Kang-hu, a professor of Chinese, and began an eleven-year collaboration with him on the translation of Tang dynasty poems. His teaching contract was not renewed, but his students continued to meet as a group and he occasionally joined them. An elaborate dinner honoring him was held at the Bohemian Club in San Francisco. A festschrift, a book of poems by students and friends, W.B. in California, was given to all who were present.

Bynner returned to China, living there from June 1920 to April 1921 for intensive study of Chinese literature and culture. He met sculptor Beniamino Bufano en route. After returning to California, Bynner went to see family in New York. He embarked on another lecture tour, reaching Santa Fe, New Mexico in February 1922. Exhausted and suffering from a lingering cold, he decided to cancel the rest of his tour and rest there.

== Santa Fe and Mexico ==
Finding the small city very appealing, in June 1922 Bynner moved permanently to Santa Fe. He first returned to Berkeley, where he recruited his former student Walter Willard 'Spud' Johnson to join him as his secretary (and lover). Mabel Dodge Luhan introduced the two men to D.H. Lawrence and his wife Frieda.

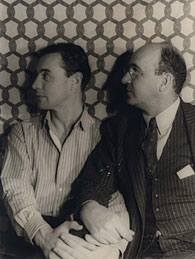
Robert Hunt and Witter Bynner

The following year, Bynner and Johnson joined the Lawrences on a trip through Mexico. Lawrence was inspired to write several essays related to the trip, and his novel The Plumed Serpent, includes characters based on Bynner and Johnson. Bynner also produced related writings: three poems about Lawrence, and his memoir Journey with Genius, published in 1951.

Luhan was not pleased that the two couples had traveled together, as she wanted to be at the center of the community. She is said to have taken revenge on Bynner by hiring Johnson to be her own secretary. Bynner in turn wrote a play, Cake, satirizing her lifestyle.

In 1930 Robert "Bob" Hunt (1906–1964) arrived in Santa Fe, originally for a visit while recuperating from an illness. He and Bynner began a relationship which lasted for the rest of Hunt's life. Together they entertained artists and literary figures such as Ansel Adams, W. H. Auden, Willa Cather, Robert Frost, Martha Graham, Aldous Huxley, Christopher Isherwood, D. H. Lawrence, Edna St. Vincent Millay, James Merrill, Georgia O'Keeffe, Carl Sandburg, Igor Stravinsky, Carl Van Vechten, and Thornton Wilder. They also made frequent visits to a second home in Chapala, Mexico, that they had bought from the Mexican architect Luis Barragán.

Bynner spent much of the 1940s and early 1950s in Chapala, until he began to lose his eyesight. He returned to the U.S., received treatment, and traveled to Europe with Hunt. By the late 1950s and early 1960s, Hunt took increasing responsibility for Bynner. Hunt died of a heart attack in January 1964.

On January 18, 1965, Bynner had a severe stroke. He never recovered, and required constant care until he died on June 1, 1968. Hunt and Bynner's ashes are buried beneath the carved stone weeping dog at the house where he lived on Atalaya Hill in Santa Fe, now the president's home at St. John's College.

== Legacy ==
From 1921 to 1923, Bynner had served as president of the Poetry Society of America. To encourage young poets, he created the Witter Bynner Prize for Undergraduate Excellence in Poetry, administered by the Poetry Society in cooperation with Palms poetry magazine, of which he was associate editor. African-American poets received the award soon after it was established: Countee Cullen in 1925 and Langston Hughes in 1926.

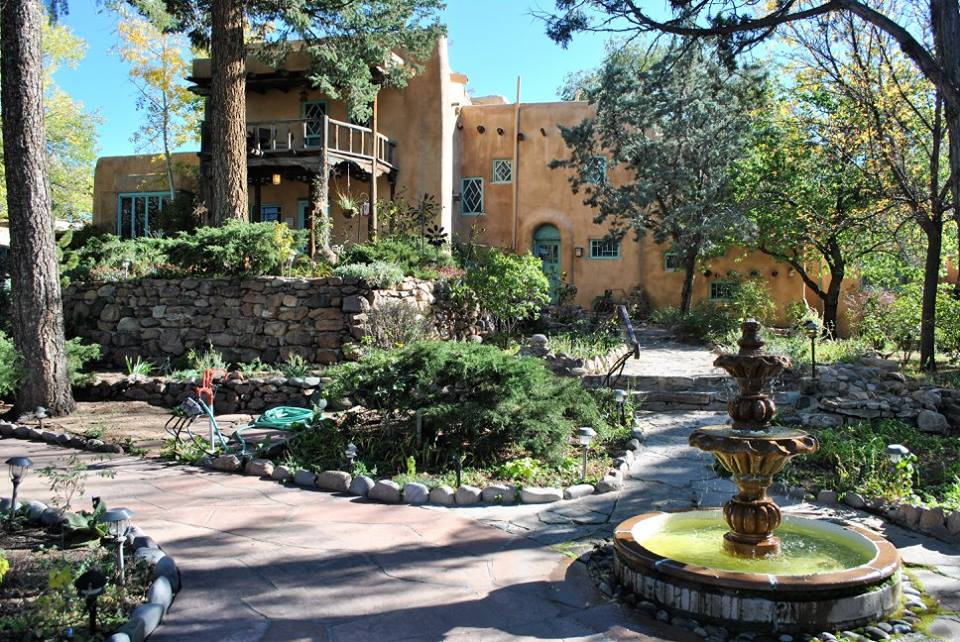
Witter Bynner House, Santa Fe

Bynner's home in Santa Fe is now a bed and breakfast called the Inn of the Turquoise Bear.

In 1972, the Witter Bynner Foundation for Poetry was founded through a bequest from Bynner. It makes grants to perpetuate the art of poetry, primarily by supporting individual poets, translations, and audience development. Since 1997, it has funded the Witter Bynner Fellowship, the recipient of which is selected by the U.S. Poet Laureate.

A Witter Bynner Poetry Prize was established by the American Academy and Institute of Arts and Letters in 1980 to support young poets. It was discontinued in 2003.

== Publications ==
=== Books of poetry, plays and memoirs ===
- An Ode to Harvard and Other Poems (Boston: Small, Maynard & Company, 1907).
- Young Harvard and Other Poems (New York: Frederick A. Stokes Company, 1907) and (New York: A. A. Knopf, 1925).
- Tiger (New York: M. Kennerley, 1913) and (London: D.J. Rider, 1914).
- The Little King (New York: M. Kennerley, 1914).
- The New World (New York: M. Kennerley, 1915) and (New York: M. Kennerley, 1918).
- Chariots ([New York, 1916]).
- Grenstone Poems (New York: F.A. Stokes, c1917) and (New York: A. A. Knopf, 1926).
- A Canticle of Praise (San Francisco, Calif.: 1918).
- The Beloved Stranger: Two Books of Song and a Divertisement for the Unknown Lover (New York: Alfred A. Knopf, 1919) and (New York: A.A. Knopf, 1930).
- A Canticle of Pan and Other Poems (New York: Knopf, 1920).
- Pins for Wings ([New York]: Sunwise Turn, c1920) (as Emanuel Morgan).
- A Book of Plays (New York: Alfred A. Knopf, 1922).
- In memoriam 2567: The Household on the Hill (Pittsburgh, Penn.: Laboratory Press, Carnegie Institute of Technology, 1923).
- Wisteria (San Francisco: Privately printed, 1923).
- An Import of China ([Newark (N.J.)]: Newark Museum and Public Library, 1924).
- Caravan (New York: A.A. Knopf, 1925).
- Cake: An Indulgence (New York, London: A. A. Knopf, 1926).
- Roots (New York: Random House, 1929).
- The Persistence of Poetry (San Francisco: The Book Club of California, 1929).
- Indian Earth (New York: A. A. Knopf, 1930).
- Anne ([San Francisco CA: A.M. Bender, 1930]).
- Eden Tree ... (New York: A.A. Knopf, 1931).
- Against the Cold ([New York: A. A. Knopf, c1933]).
- Guest Book (New York: Knopf, 1935).
- Against the Cold (New York: A. A. Knopf, 1940).
- Take Away the Darkness (New York: A.A. Knopf, [c1947])
- Poems ([Kansas City: s.n.], 1950).
- Journey With Genius: Reflections and Reminiscences Concerning the D. H. Lawrences (New York, J. Day Co. [1951]).
- Book of Lyric (New York: Knopf, 1955).
- New Poems, 1960 (New York: Knopf, c1960).

=== Collaborations and contributions ===
- Spectra: a Book of Poetic Experiments (New York: Mitchell Kennerley, 1916) (as "Emanuel Morgan" with Arthur Davison Ficke as "Anne Knish").
- Others: The Spectric School: Poems (New York: Others, 1917) (as "Emanuel Morgan" with Arthur Davison Ficke as "Anne Knish" and Marjorie Allen Seiffert as "Elijah Hay").
- Mansfield, Richard, Courage! (New York: Moffat, Yard and Company [c 1918]) (Preface by Bynner).
- Ford, Julia Ellsworth, Snickerty Nick (New York: Moffat, Yard, (c. 1919) (Rhymes by Bynner).
- Tuckerman, Frederick Goddard, The Sonnets of Frederick Goddard Tuckerman (New York, A. A. Knopf, 1931) (edited by and with a foreword by Bynner).

=== Translations ===
- Iphigenia in Tauris; an English Version (New York: M. Kennerley, 1915) (translation of Euripides).
- Vildrac, Charles, A Book of Love (New York: E.P. Dutton, c1923) (translated from the French by Bynner). From HathiTrust: A Book of Love.
- Heng-tʻang-tʻui-shih, The Jade Mountain: A Chinese Anthology (New York: Knopf, 1929 (translation by Bynner).
- Lao-Tzu, The Way of Life according to Laotzu (New York, The John Day Company [1944]) and (London : Lyrebird Press Ltd., 1972) ("American version" by Bynner). Note that this is a translation of the Tao Te Ching.

=== Edited collections and anthologies ===
- Braithwaite, William Stanley, An Anthology of Magazine Verse for 1913 Including the Magazines and the Poets: A Review (Cambridge, Massachusetts: Thomas Todd Co. for W.S.B., c1913).
- Braithwaite, William Stanley, An Anthology of Magazine Verse for 1914 and Yearbook of American Poetry (Cambridge, Massachusetts: Vail Ballou Co. for W.S.B., c1914).
- Mearnes, Hughes, Walter Bynner (New York: Simon & Schuster, 1927).
- Hunt Robert (ed.), Selected Poems (New York, London" A. A. Knopf: 1936) and (New York, A. A. Knopf, 1943).
- Firmage, George J. (ed.), A Garland for Dyland Thomas (New York: Clarke & Way [1963]).
- Dolmetsch, Carl R., The Smart Set: A History and Anthology (New York: Dial Press, 1966).
- Hughes, Langston and Bontemps, Anna (eds.), The Poetry of the Negro, 1746–1970 (Garden City, N.Y.: Doubleday, 1970).
- Kraft, James (ed.), The Selected Witter Bynner: Poems, Plays, Translations, Prose, and Letters (Albuquerque, NM : University of New Mexico Press, c1995). Bynner, Witter; Kraft, James (January 1995). The Selected Witter Bynner: Poems, Plays, Translations, Prose, and Letters. University of New Mexico Press. ISBN 0826316077.
- Hass, Robert (ed.), American Poetry: The Twentieth Century (New York: Library of America: Distributed to the trade in the U.S. by Penguin Putnam, c2000).
- Mezey, Robert (ed.), Poems of the American West (New York: Alfred A. Knopf, c2002).
- Parisi, Joseph and Young, Stephen (eds.), The Poetry Anthology, 1912–2002 : Ninety Years of America's Most Distinguished Verse Magazine (Chicago: Ivan R. Dee, 2002).
- Shapiro, Harvey (ed.), Poets of World War II (New York : The Library of America, 2003).

=== "The Works of Witter Bynner" ===
- Smith, William Jay (ed.), Light Verse and Satire [of Witter Bynner] (New York: Farrar, Straus, Giroux, c1978).
- Wilbur, Richard (ed.), Selected Poems of Wytter Bynner (New York: Farrar, Straus, Giroux, c1978).
- Kraft, James (ed.), Prose Pieces [of Witter Bynner] (New York: Farrar, Straus, Giroux, c1979).
- Watson, B and Lattimore, D. (introduction), The Chinese Translations (New York : Farrar, Straus, Giroux, c1978).
- Kraft, James (ed.), Selected Letters (New York: Farrar, Straus, Giroux, c1981).
