= Phebe Sudlow =

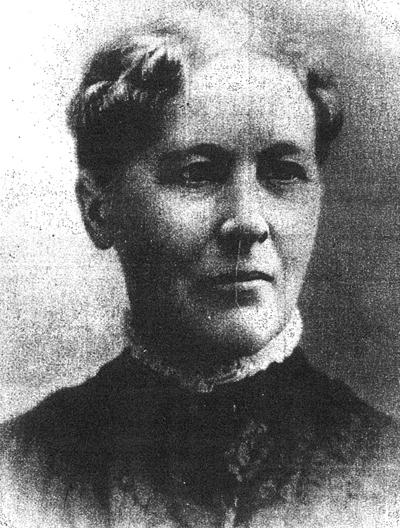
- Born: July 11, 1831; Poughkeepsie, New York
- Died: June 8, 1922 (aged 90); Davenport, Iowa
- Occupation: Educator
- Known for: Pioneer for women in education

Phebe W. Sudlow (July 11, 1831 – June 8, 1922) was a pioneer for women in the education field and was the first female superintendent of a public school system in the United States. Sudlow also became the first female professor at the University of Iowa in 1878, despite having no formal college degree.

== Biography ==
Phebe W. Sudlow was born on July 11, 1831, in Poughkeepsie, New York. When Sudlow was four, she, her parents Richard and Hannah, and her five siblings moved to Nelsonville, Ohio. Sudlow soon began teaching, at the age of fifteen, at the same school where she was taught. After the death of her father in 1855, Sudlow moved to Rockford, Illinois, to live with her brother and a year later moved to rural Scott County, Iowa. Sudlow started teaching at a local school, and soon was moved by Superintendent Abram S. Kissell to Davenport sub-district 5 as an assistant of the district.

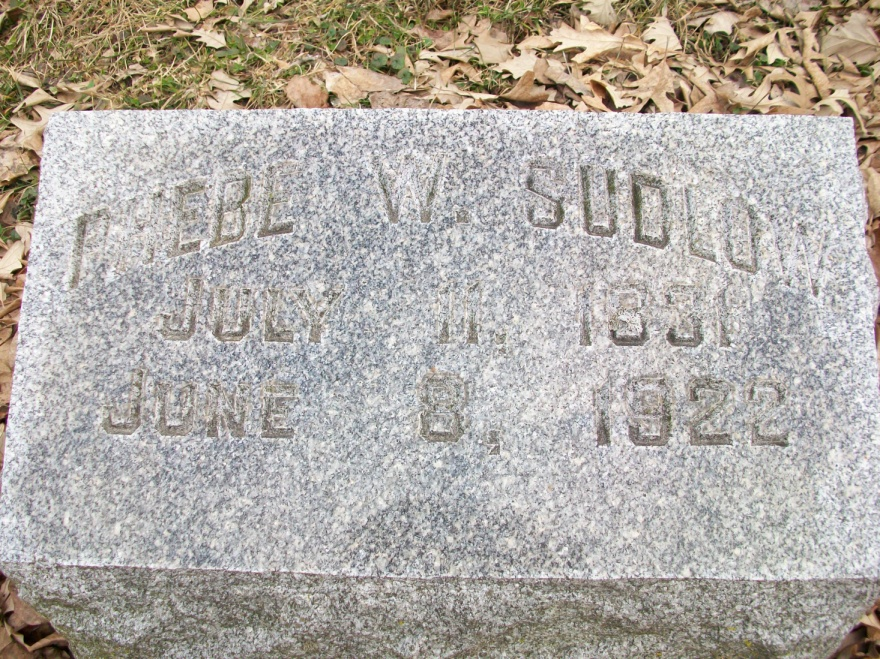
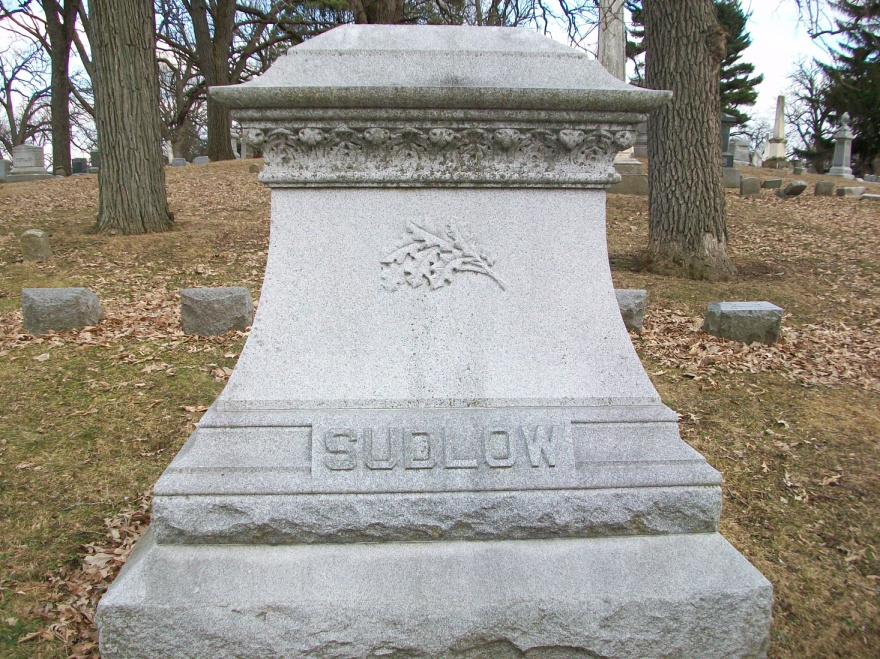
Phebe Sudlow's grave at Oakdale Cemetery.

She soon became the assistant principal of two schools in Davenport and a year later, in 1860, she was the principal of both schools. Sudlow was paid a wage less than that of male principals. She argued with the school board about the pay disparate, and was soon paid an equal wage. On June 19, 1874, Sudlow became the first woman in United States history to be appointed superintendent of public schools when she was unanimously chosen by the Davenport school board.

She originally was offered a lower salary than that of a male superintendent, but was paid an equal wage after she told the school board, "Gentlemen, if you are cutting the salary because of my experience, I have nothing to say; but if you are doing this because I am a woman, I’ll have nothing more to do with it." Sudlow served as superintendent for four years. Among her achievements was the construction of a new high school.

In 1876, Sudlow became the first female president of the Iowa State Teachers Association. She obtained another first by becoming the first female professor at the University of Iowa in Iowa City, Iowa, despite having only an honorary master's degree from Grinnell College. She taught at the university for three years when she resigned due to poor health. She went back to Davenport to become a principal for one year before retiring from education.

On June 8, 1922, Sudlow died in her home in Davenport. She is buried in Oakdale Cemetery in Davenport. Sudlow was inducted into the Iowa Women's Hall of Fame in 1993.
