= Robert Duax =

American athlete, coach, and politician (1919–1997)

Biographical details
- Born: October 26, 1919; Chippewa Falls, Wisconsin, U.S.
- Died: December 18, 1997 (aged 78); Davenport, Iowa, U.S.

Playing career

Football
- 1937–1940: Saint Joseph's (IN)

Coaching career (HC unless noted)

Football
- 1974: St. Ambrose

Men's basketball
- 1951–1966: St. Ambrose

Women's basketball
- 1975–1977: St. Ambrose

Administrative career (AD unless noted)
- 1966–1975: St. Ambrose

Head coaching record
- Overall: 164–175 (men's college basketball); 25–9 (women's college basketball)

Accomplishments and honors

Awards
- Ambrose University Athletic Hall of Fame (1983)

Robert John Duax Sr. (October 26, 1919 – December 18, 1997) was an American athlete, coach, and politician. He was an All-Chicago football player and a star halfback for the St. Joseph's College football team. From the early 1940s through the 1990s, he was a coach, instructor and administrator, including 16 years as the head basketball coach and nine years as the athletic director, at St. Ambrose University in Davenport, Iowa. He earned a reputation as a basketball innovator and strategist and founded the St. Ambrose women's basketball team, serving as its first head coach from 1975 to 1977. He also held several political offices in the 1960s and 1970s, including service as mayor of Davenport from 1976 to 1977.

== Early years ==
Duax was born in Chippewa Falls, Wisconsin, in 1919. He moved to Chicago in his youth where his father, Charles Duax, was employed as a butter and food products salesman. Duax attended St. Phillip's School in Chicago. He was an All-Chicago halfback in high school, and his high school coach called him "the best football player, pound for pound, I've ever coached."

Duax next attended St. Joseph's College in Rensselaer, Indiana. He was a triple-threat halfback for the St. Joseph's football team and the team's leading scorer in 1939 and was considered one of the best punters in Indiana. He was reported to be a "fast and shifty" back around whom St. Joseph's built its attack.

== Coaching career ==
Duax began his coaching career at the high school level. In 1941, he was hired as the athletic director and basketball coach at Catholic Central High School in Hammond, Indiana. He later compiled a 63–37 record as the basketball coach at Bishop Noll Institute in Hammond, in the 1940s.

In 1951, Duax left De La Salle High School in Chicago to become the head basketball coach at St. Ambrose University in Davenport, Iowa. He continued in a variety of positions at St. Ambrose for 40 years until 1991. He became known as one of the top offensive basketball coaches in Iowa, and his men's basketball team compiled a school-record 17-game winning streak from 1953 to 1954. After suffering a heart attack, and citing health issues, he resigned as the head basketball coach in 1966. He compiled a 164–175 record in 15 seasons as the men's basketball coach.

Although the full-court press was in existence by the late 1930s, Duax has been credited by some as an innovator (more likely, early adopter) of the strategy. In 1961, Duax described his coaching philosophy as follows:

"At St. Ambrose, we play a very aggressive type of defense and do a lot of running. I personally feel basketball is about 60 percent conditioning, 30 percent talent, and 10 percent coaching."

After resigning as the men's basketball coach, Duax in September 1966 assumed the job as St. Ambrose's athletic director. He served as athletic director until his resignation in May 1975, though he remained on the faculty as an instructor in physical education. He also helped establish the St. Ambrose women's basketball team, serving as the team's first head coach from 1975 to 1977. His women's basketball teams compiled a 25–9 record in his two years as head coach. He was inducted into the St. Ambrose University Athletic Hall of Fame in 1983.

== Political career ==
Duax also held a number of political offices in Davenport, Iowa, the third largest city in Iowa. In November 1965, running as a Republican, he was elected as an alderman in Davenport's heavily Democratic third ward. Duax was also elected to two terms on the Scott County Board of Supervisors, and served as the chairman of the Quad Cities' Bi-State Metropolitan Planning Commission for a time in the 1970s.

In November 1975, Duax was first elected as mayor of Davenport as a Republican, after defeating Dallas George in a contest featuring five candidates. During his time as mayor, he continued to coach the women's basketball team at St. Ambrose. In a 1976 feature story on Duax, the Des Moines Register wrote:

"By day, he is Davenport's chief worrier about sewers, streets, tight municipal budgets, salaries for more than 1,000 municipal workers, and a host of governmental headaches. But come late afternoon, or on frequent nights and weekends during the winter, he turns his worrying to such matters as polishing a stingy basketball defense, balancing a sometimes sluggish scoring assault, and building the endurance of a dozen young women."

He was defeated in a November 1977 campaign for re-election as mayor.

== Family ==
Duax married Betty J. Arthur in 1940 in Logansport, Indiana. He is the father to eleven and grandfather to at least 40. He died on December 17, 1997.
