= Spectra (poetry collection) =

Poetry volume by Witter Bynner and Arthur Davison Ficke

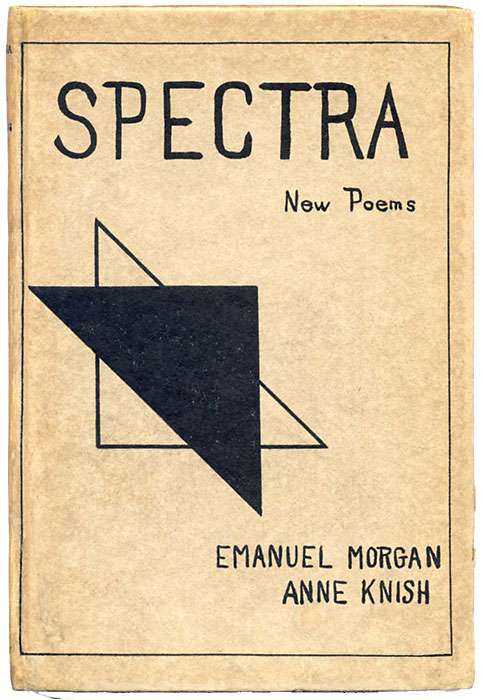

Spectra: A Book of Poetic Experiments was a small volume of poetry published in 1916 by American writers Witter Bynner, who wrote under the pseudonym "Emanuel Morgan", and Arthur Davison Ficke, who wrote as "Anne Knish." The book was intended as satire directed at the Imagism poetry movement.

Spectra was preceded by a brief manifesto outlining the Spectric method as a school:

- "In the first place, it speaks, to the mind of that process of diffraction by which are disarticulated the several colored and other rays of which light is composed. . . ."
- "In its second sense, the term Spectric relates to the reflex vibrations of physical sight, and suggests the luminous appearance which is seen after the exposure of the eye to intense light, and, by analogy, the after-colors of the poets initial vision."
- "In its third sense, Spectric connotes the overtones, adumbrations, or spectres which for the poet haunt all objects of both the seen and unseen world. . . ."

The poems in the collection were identified by opus numbers rather than titles, and mostly take on a silly tone.

From "Opus 6" by Emanuel Morgan:

If I were only dafter

I might be making hymns

To the liquor of your laughter

And the lacquer of your limbs.

Anne Knish's Opus 118:

If bathing were a virtue, not a lust
I would be dirtiest.

To some, housecleaning is a holy rite.
For myself, houses would be empty
But for the golden motes dancing in sunbeams.

Tax-assessors frequently overlook valuables.
Today they noted my jade.
But my memory of you escaped them.

Spectra was intended solely as a joke. Initially, even the publisher was fooled by the book, but he was let in on the joke before going to press. The authors assumed the ridiculousness of the work would shine through, but it was actually accepted as a legitimate poetic movement for two years. In 1918, Bynner admitted in a public speech that he had co-authored the book and explained the hoax.

Both Bynner and Ficke were accomplished poets of their time, but the Spectra poems are probably the most widely remembered of their work. Both authors admitted to the hoax having backfired to a certain extent, as it overshadowed their more serious work. Nonetheless, Ficke stated that he learned a good deal about composition while writing as Knish, adding that it actually influenced his later work.

== See also ==
- Literary forgery
