= Ficke Block =

- U.S. National Register of Historic Places
- U.S. Historic district – Contributing property
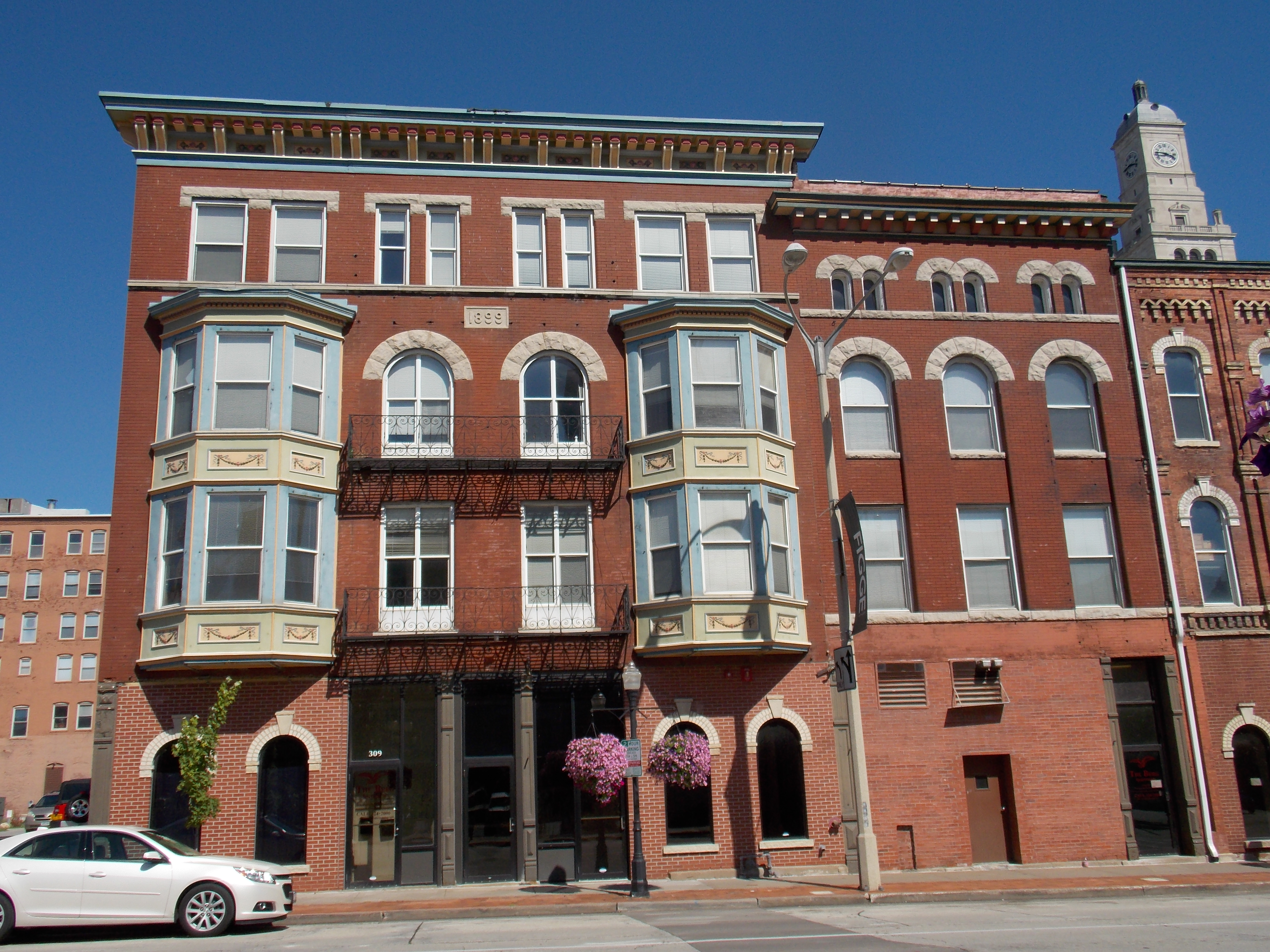

- Location within Iowa Location within the United States
- Location: 307-309 Harrison St. Davenport, Iowa
- Coordinates: 41°31′23″N 90°34′36″W
- Area: less than one acre
- Built: 1899
- Built by: John Whitaker
- Architect: Frederick G. Clausen
- Architectural style: Late Victorian
- Part of: Davenport Downtown Commercial Historic District (ID100005546)
- MPS: Davenport MRA
- NRHP reference No.: 83002427
- Added to NRHP: July 7, 1983

The Ficke Block is a historic building located in downtown Davenport, Iowa, United States. It was individually listed on the National Register of Historic Places in 1983. In 2020 it was included as a contributing property in the Davenport Downtown Commercial Historic District.

== History ==
The building at 309 Harrison Street is associated with a prominent Davenport Attorney Charles August (C.A.) Ficke. He was responsible for building or renovating numerous properties in the downtown area. The block, which has the appearance of two separate buildings, was built in 1899 to house the McCormick Division of the International Harvesting Company of America and apartments on the upper floors. The southern storefront (307) became the L.R. Wareham pool hall in 1915 and remained a pool hall through the 1940s. The north side (309) was home to a variety of businesses that included: City Fuel and Lumber Company, Bee Jay Tire Service, the Savoy Café, the Colorado Restaurant, the Old Timer (tavern), and the Three Hundred Nine Tavern. It currently houses the Berg Apartments.

== Architecture ==
The Ficke Block is a four-story, brick structure built on a stone foundation. It features many details found in late Victorian architecture: rusticated, semi-circular window arches on the third floor, and flat stone lintels over the paired windows on the fourth floor recall the Romanesque style. A pair of two-story bay windows with embossed garland swags, wrought iron balconies, and ornate cornices reflect the Queen Anne style. The storefronts, however, have been significantly altered.
