= Arthur Davison Ficke =

American writer and poet (1883–1945)

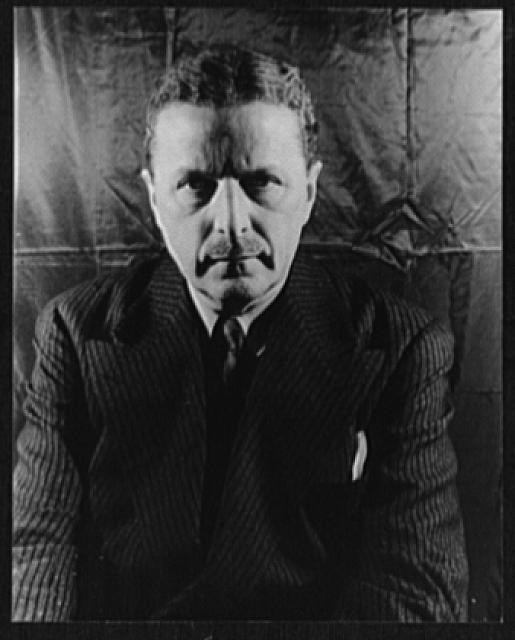
- Born: Arthur Davison Ficke; November 10, 1883; Davenport, Iowa, US
- Died: November 30, 1945 (aged 62); Hudson, New York, US
- Other name: Anne Knish
- Education: Harvard
- Occupation: Poet
- Known for: Sonnets of a Portrait Painter; Spectra
- Spouses: Evelyn B Blunt; Gladys Brown
- Children: 1

Arthur Davison Ficke (November 10, 1883 – November 30, 1945) was an American poet, playwright, and expert on Japanese art. Ficke had a national reputation as "a poet's poet", and "one of America's most expert sonneteers". Under the alias Anne Knish, Ficke co-authored Spectra (1916). Intended as a spoof of the experimental verse which was fashionable at the time, the collection of strange poems unexpectedly caused a sensation among modernist critics which eclipsed Ficke's recognition as a traditional prose stylist. Ficke is also known for his relationship with poet Edna St. Vincent Millay.

After a lengthy battle with throat cancer, Arthur died from his illness on November 30, 1945.

== Biography ==
A native of Davenport, Iowa, Ficke is associated with other local writers known as the Davenport group. His work was influenced by Japanese artistic traditions, which he had been familiar with since childhood; his father, an art dealer, imported Japanese art in the last decade of the nineteenth century, when it was extremely popular. Ficke wrote several popular treatises on Japanese art during his career, among them Chats on Japanese Prints, published in 1915.

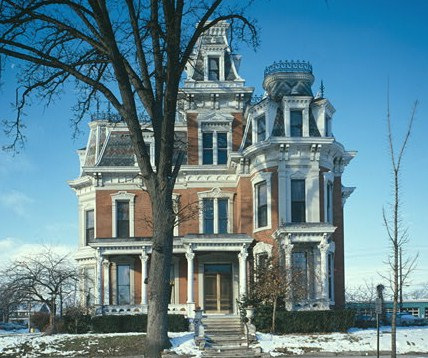
Ficke's boyhood home in Davenport.

Sticking to traditional styles and forms when modernism was dominating the world of literature and poets were prone to experimentation, Ficke was noted for being "in the best sense a conservative force in our poetry." Much of his early work was in traditional meter and rhyme scheme; Sonnets of a Portrait-Painter (1914) is a noteworthy example.

Ficke was displeased by what he saw as the inaesthetic nature of contemporary experimentation, which was the main motivation for the Spectra hoax, intended as a satire of modern poetry. His collaborators on the Spectra hoax were fellow poets Witter Bynner (writing as 'Emanuel Morgan') and Marjorie Allen Seiffert (writing as 'Elijah Hay'). Ironically, his experience writing Spectra influenced him to begin experimenting with other forms; Christ in the Desert was his first more modernistic work, without traditional meter or rhyme scheme.

== Partial bibliography ==
Poetry

- (1907) From the Isles: A Series of Songs out of Greece
- (1907) The Happy Princess, and Other Poems
- (1908) The Earth Passion, Boundary, and Other Poems
- (1910) Some Recent Poems of Note
- (1914) Sonnets of a Portrait-Painter
- (1915) The Man on the Hilltop, and Other Poems
- (1916) Spectra: A Book of Poetic Experiments; as Anne Knish, with Witter Bynner as Emanuel Morgan
- (1917) An April Elegy
- (1924) Out of Silence, and Other Poems
- (1926) Selected Poems
- (1927) Christ in China: A Poem
- (1929) Mountain against Mountain
- (1936) The Secret, and Other Poems
- (1942) Tumultuous Shore, and Other Poems

Plays

- (1910) The Breaking of Bonds: A Drama of the Social Unrest
- (1913) Mr. Faust
- (1930) The Road to the Mountain: A Lyrical Pageant in Three Acts
- (1951) The Ghost of Sharaku

Novels

- (1939) Mrs. Morton of Mexico

Non-fiction

- (1913) Twelve Japanese Painters [via HathiTrust]
- (1915) Chats on Japanese Prints
