= Institute of Aesthetic Research =

Mexican art research community

Coordinates: 19.3170°N 99.1826°W

The Institute of Aesthetic Research (Spanish: Instituto de Investigaciones Estéticas) of the National Autonomous University of Mexico, since its foundation in 1936, research has been carried out in its installations into the different forms of artistic expression in Mexico. It has thus become a space where the plastic arts converge with dance, literature, photography, cinema and music.

Every year, through its International Colloquium on Art History, the Institute opens its doors to academic reflection on the history of art. Since 1975, this space has been a meeting point for the voices of both Mexican and foreign researchers.

== Areas ==
To perform its tasks of study and dissemination, the Institute harbors a number of different works of Mexican art and art from other countries; each of which has its own particular sphere of interest.

- The Manuel Toussaint Photographic Archive conserves the collections of images which serve as a support for academic activities. With over 750,000 images, the Archive has grown to become the country's most important repository of visual documents related to Mexican art, and it also has a specialized conservation laboratory. The tasks carried out in the Archive range from the lending of materials for consultation to the organization of photographic exhibitions for museums in Mexico and abroad.
- The collection of the Justino Fernández Library contains an extensive amount of material devoted to the study of art. It provides support for research through its programs of donations and exchanges of books and interlibrary interchanges and loans. It also participates, by means of its book and periodical collections, in different exhibitions and in the production of television programs.
- The Documentary Investigation Department carries out research activities in different archives in Mexico. Its labors are concentrated in the Catalogues of art documents. These tools help to orient the Institute's investigations and represent a significant labor of collaboration in its output.
- The Laboratory for Diagnosis of Works of Art participates in projects aimed at researching and conserving the national artistic heritage, by means of the analysis of materials and procedures used in the creation of works of art.
- In December 2007, the Hypermedia Laboratory commenced its activities. In it are the Institute community's interests in exploiting the possibilities of digital technology for the study, investigation and dissemination of art history.
- The most important medium for disseminating the Institute's research are printed books. Every title published by the Publications Department is an endorsement of the Institute's commitment to maintaining the exceptional quality that has been attained by its printed media. In this effort it is accompanied by the journal Anales del Instituto de Investigaciones Estéticas, which twice-yearly, offers within its pages the work of prestigious researchers from all over the world.

== Publications ==
The distribution of the Institute's publications is not limited to the UNAM's system of libraries, but extends to other sales outlets. The electronic shop, still under construction, is also oriented towards the same /will also make a contribution to this effort, bringing the Institute's work to a broader public.

The journal Imágenes is an electronic publication which offers various articles publicizing the Institute's academic activities and other news items to do with the history of art. Its contents and characteristics have made it the most visited section of the Institute's electronic portal.

== Facilities ==
In August 2007, work started at the new branch headquarters of the Instituto de Investigaciones Estéticas in the City of Oaxaca, which are lodged in an old domestic building in the Alameda de León, which dates from the eighteenth century and was received by the UNAM in commodatum in 2005.

This branch is home to a library comprising over six thousand volumes which belonged to Dr. Beatriz de la Fuente, among which are some facsimiles of pre-Hispanic codices. Equipment installed is similar to that of the Francisco de la Maza room in the Institute's headquarters on the university campus in Mexico City, thus facilitating constant communication between both.
