= Robert Hunt (poet) =

American poet (1906–1964)

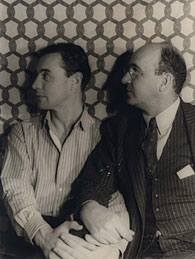
- Robert Hunt and Witter Bynner
- Born: May 19, 1906; Pasadena, California
- Died: January 18, 1964 (aged 57)
- Resting place: Santa Fe, New Mexico
- Occupation: Poet
- Partner: Witter Bynner
- Father: Myron Hunt

Robert Nichols Montague Hunt (May 19, 1906 – January 18, 1964) was an American poet and long-time partner of Witter Bynner.

== Early life ==
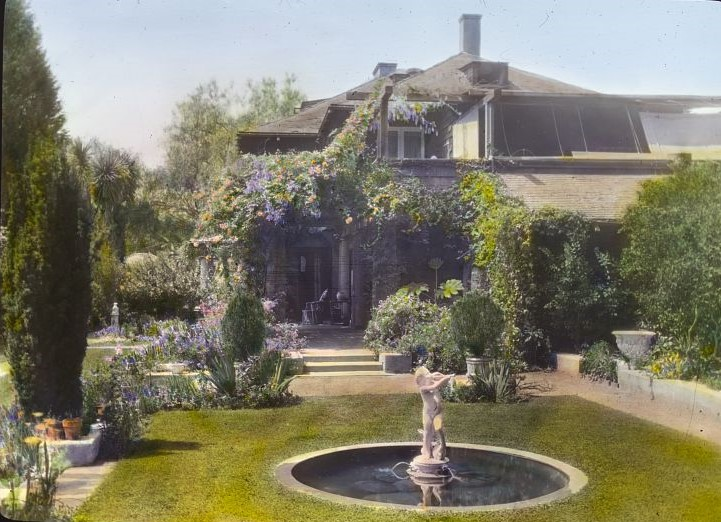
Myron Hunt house, 200 North Grand Avenue, Pasadena, photo by Frances Benjamin Johnston, 1917. Both the house and landscape were designed in 1905 by architect Myron Hunt. This formal garden no longer exists; the house continues to be used as a private residence

He was born in Pasadena, California, on May 19, 1906, the son of successful architect Myron Hunt and his wife Harriette Boardman. The senior Hunt designed and built a mansion as their family residence. As a young adult, Robert worked briefly for his father, demonstrating that he was a talented designer.

== Career ==
Hunt is the author of a collection of 18 poems, The Early World and other poems, dedicated to his lover, poet Witter Bynner. Hunt edited Bynner's Selected Poems.

== Personal life ==
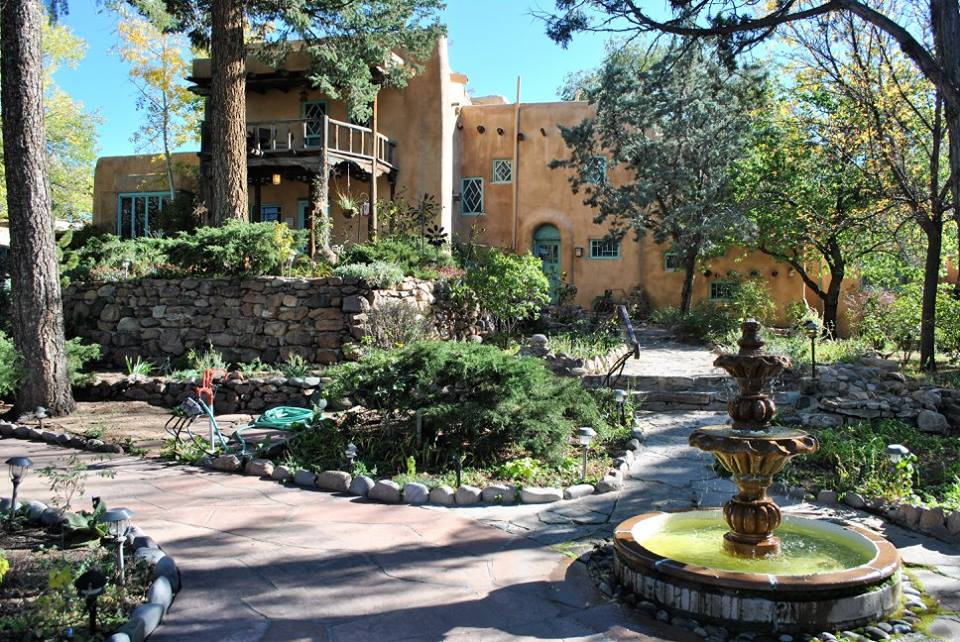
Witter Bynner House, Santa Fe

Hunt and Bynner first met in 1924 through being introduced by historian Paul Horgan. They met again in Santa Fe in 1926 and in Los Angeles in 1928. In 1930 Hunt arrived in Santa Fe again, originally for a visit while recuperating from a stress-related illness. He stayed on as Bynner's lifelong companion. The relationship lasted until Hunt's sudden death by heart attack in 1964.

When living with Bynner, Hunt designed an addition of a wing to Bynner's home. He also designed alterations to their Chapala, Mexico home, which they purchased from Mexican architect Luis Barragán). Hunt also redesigned the living room of Peter Hurd's ranch in San Patricio, New Mexico.

During WWII Hunt could not serve in the military because of health issues. He served on the local draft board for a year. In early 1943 he left Bynner at their second home in Chapala, and returned to the United States to assist the war effort. He went to work on the docks in San Francisco, where the city was deeply engaged in the defense industry and supplying the Pacific.

In 1950, Bynner and Hunt toured Europe. They visited, among others, American writers Thornton Wilder and James Baldwin in Paris, and philosopher George Santayana and Sybille Bedford in Rome.

Bynner and Hunt's ashes are buried near the house where they lived on Atalaya Hill in Santa Fe. The site is marked by a carved stone figure of a weeping dog.
