= Manuel Toussaint =

Mexican art historian (1890-1955)

Manuel Toussaint y Ritter
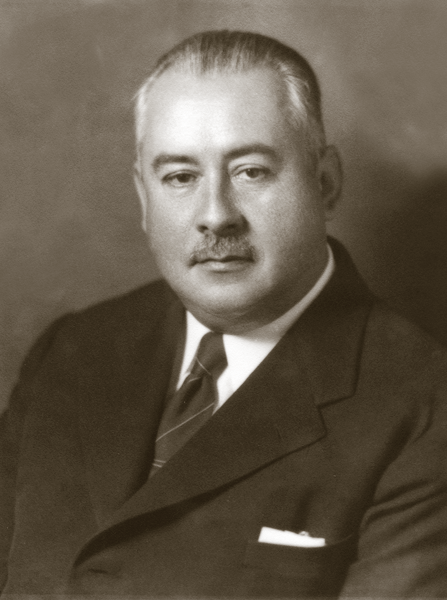
- Born: May 29, 1890; Coyoacan, Mexico City
- Died: November 9, 1955 (aged 65); New York, New York
- Occupation: Director: Instituto de Investigaciones Estéticas
- Board member of: El Colegio Nacional; Academia Mexicana de la Lengua; Academia Mexicana de la Historia; Academia Nacional de Bellas Artes

Academic background
- Education: Universidad Nacional Autónoma de México

Academic work
- Discipline: Historian
- Sub-discipline: Mexican History and Art
- Institutions: Universidad Nacional Autónoma de México; Instituto de Investigaciones Estéticas
- Notable students: Justino Fernández; Francisco de la Maza
- Main interests: Mexican Colonial Era History and Art; Mexican Prehispanic History and Art; Mexican 19th century History and Art
- Notable works: Paseos Coloniales; La Catedral de México y el Sagrario Metropolitano; La pintura en México durante el siglo XVI; Viajes alucinados

Manuel Toussaint y Ritter (29 May 1890 – 9 November 1955) was a Mexican notable historian, writer, essayist, literary and art critic, art historian and academic. He is best known for his work on Mexican history, especially during the colonial period. His scholarship was influential in shaping the understanding of Mexico's history during the 20th century.

Toussaint is recognized for his contributions to historical methodology and for his writings that helped frame the understanding of Mexican history in a more critical light.

He was a forerunner in the study of the history of colonial art in Mexico, and was also interested in pre-Hispanic and 19th-century art. He was a defender of the country's artistic heritage.

He authored over 30 books and more than 250 essays and articles.

== Early life ==
He was born on May 29, 1890 in Coyoacan, Mexico City. He studied at the Escuela Nacional Preparatoria, and later at the National School of Fine Arts (Escuela Nacional de Bellas Artes), at the School of Higher Education and at the School of Philosophy and Letters of the National Autonomous University of Mexico (UNAM).

== Biography ==
In 1916, he founded the publisher Editorial Cvltura with Julio Torri and Agustin Loera y Chavez, who would become the most important publisher of classical and contemporary literary texts in the first half of the 20th century.

Between 1928 and 1929, he directed the National School of Fine Arts, where he taught art history and colonial history.

In 1935 he founded the Art Laboratory of the National Autonomous University of Mexico, now called the Institute of Aesthetic Research, and directed it from 1938 until his death in 1955.

Between 1945 and 1954, he directed the Department of colonial monuments of México, dependant of the Instituto Nacional de Antropología e Historia.

In 1952, he was named Mexico's representative at the Comite International d'Histoire de I'Art.

Toussaint traveled to the Art History Congress celebrated in Venice, Italy in 1955. He died returning from the trip in New York City on November 9, 1955.

== Works ==
Toussaint was a critic, essayist, poet, writer, narrator of travels to Mexico and abroad, philosopher, writer of a children's novel and illustrator of his own books.

He was the author of over 30 books and more than 250 essays an articles. Among them, La pintura en México durante el siglo XVI (1936), Viajes alucinados (1924), Arte colonial en México (Colonial art in Mexico) from 1948 and La Catedral de México y el Sagrario Metropolitano, published in 1948 and his most esteemed work. His most popular work was Paseos coloniales (Colonial strolls) from 1939.

Iglesias de México is a 6-volume monograph about Mexican churches from the colonial era between the 16th and 19 centuries. It is collaborative work between Toussaint and José R. Benítez, with illustrations and texts by Gerardo Murillo (Dr. Atl) and photographs by Guillermo Kahlo. It was published by the Secretariat of Finance in 1927.

== Distinctions ==
In Mexico he was a member of El Colegio Nacional since 1946. That same year, he was given a masters degree ex-oficio' by the National Autonomous University of Mexico.

Between 1946 and 1955, he was a member of the Academia Mexicana de la Historia, with seat number 18. Manuel Romero de Terreros replied to his speech.

He was also a member of the Academia Mexicana de la Lengua since 1954, in Argentina of the Academia Nacional de Bellas Artes and of the Academia Nacional de la Historia since 1947, and in France of the Société des Américanistes de Paris.

In 1953, his alma mater, the National Autonomous University of Mexico, gave him the doctoral degree honoris causa.
