= Figge Art Museum =

Museum in Davenport, Iowa

Coordinates: 41°31′17″N 90°34′33″W

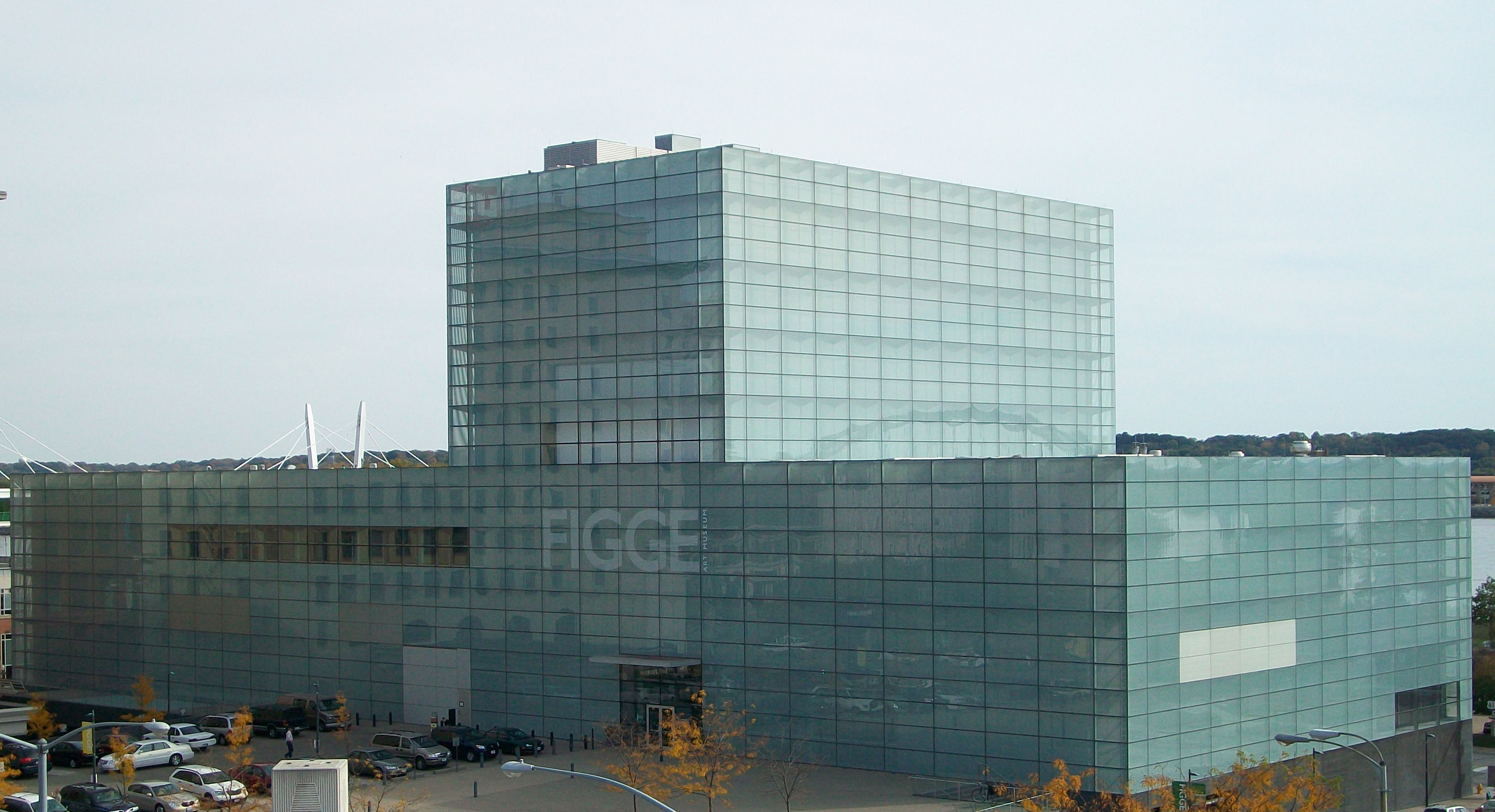
- Established: 1925; in present location since 2005
- Location: 225 W. 2nd Street, Davenport, Iowa, US
- Visitors: 76,688 (2006)
- Executive director: Melissa Mohr
- CEO: Melissa Mohr
- Architect: David Chipperfield
- Public transit access: Davenport CitiBus
- Website: www.figgeartmuseum.org

The Figge Art Museum is located on the north bank of the Mississippi River in Davenport, Iowa. The Figge, as it is commonly known, has an encyclopedic collection and serves as the major art museum for the eastern Iowa and western Illinois region. The Figge works closely with several regional universities and colleges (see below) as an art resource and collections hub for a number of higher education programs.

The museum's new building was designed by British architect David Chipperfield and opened to the public August 6, 2005. The Figge was among Chipperfield's first architectural commissions in the United States. The cost of construction was $47 million, $13 million of which was donated by the V.O. and Elizabeth Kahl Figge Foundation. Chipperfield also designed the Saint Louis Art Museum's east building which opened in 2013. In 2023, Chipperfield was awarded the Pritzker Architecture Prize, often regarded as architecture’s highest honor.

Today's Figge Art Museum is the successor to the city-owned Davenport Museum of Art (1987–2005), which itself began as the Davenport Municipal Art Gallery in 1925. The museum's original collection was donated by Charles Ficke (1850–1931), a successful lawyer and former mayor, who collected art from around the world. Robert E. Harsche, then Director of the Art Institute of Chicago, reported that to his knowledge no American public art gallery had "started out with so large a number of important paintings as a nucleus."

== Figge art collection ==
The museum has over 4,000 works of art, ranging from the 16th century to the present, and is best known for its extensive collection of Haitian, Colonial Mexican and Midwestern art, particularly pieces by Thomas Hart Benton, Marvin Cone and Grant Wood, including the only self-portrait Wood ever painted. In 1990, Grant Wood's estate, which included his personal effects and various works of art, became the property of the Figge Art Museum through his sister, Nan Wood Graham, the woman portrayed in American Gothic.

The institution also houses a substantial American collection (including works by Albert Bierstadt, James McNeill Whistler, William Merritt Chase, Winslow Homer, Andrew Wyeth, Ansel Adams, Andy Warhol, Robert Rauschenberg, Moncho1929 and Jasper Johns), European art (including work by artists such as Albrecht Dürer, Rembrandt, Claude Lorrain, Francisco Goya, Sir Thomas Lawrence, Sir Joshua Reynolds, Sir Henry Raeburn, Toulouse-Lautrec and Pierre-Auguste Renoir), and works from East Asia (with pieces by Hokusai, Hiroshige and Kunisada). As owners of Grant Wood's estate, the museum is also home to the Grant Wood Archives, and received substantial support from The Henry Luce Foundation for the conservation of these archives.

The museum exhibits an important collection of pieces by American architect and designer Frank Lloyd Wright (1867-1959). The Wright collection includes drawings, furniture, fabrics, and decorative objects from a wide range of projects spanning the architect's career. Projects represented include: Arthur Heurtley House (1902), Avery Coonley House, 1907), Edward P. Irving House (1909), Frederick C. Bogk House (1916), Johnson Wax Headquarters (1936), and the Price Tower (1952).

In 1943, the prominent Mexican art historian Manuel Toussaint traveled to Davenport, Iowa to assess the Figge's (then called the Davenport Museum of Art) collection of colonial Mexican art. He called it one of the most important in an American institution at that time and published his thoughts on the collection.

== University of Iowa art collection ==
The Figge Art Museum temporarily housed much of the University of Iowa Stanley Museum of Art collection, after the University of Iowa's gallery was flooded in 2008. With the construction of a new building for the Stanley Museum, the collection was returned to Iowa City starting in 2020.

== Western Illinois University graduate program in Museum Studies ==
The Figge Art Museum used to be home to Western Illinois University's graduate program in Museum Studies, which offers a Master of Arts degree in the various aspects of museum management, such as curatorial design, museum administration and finance, art education, collections management, and marketing/PR.

== Other information ==
The museum is 115,000 square feet (10,683 m^{2}) and has been accredited by the American Alliance of Museums since 1973.

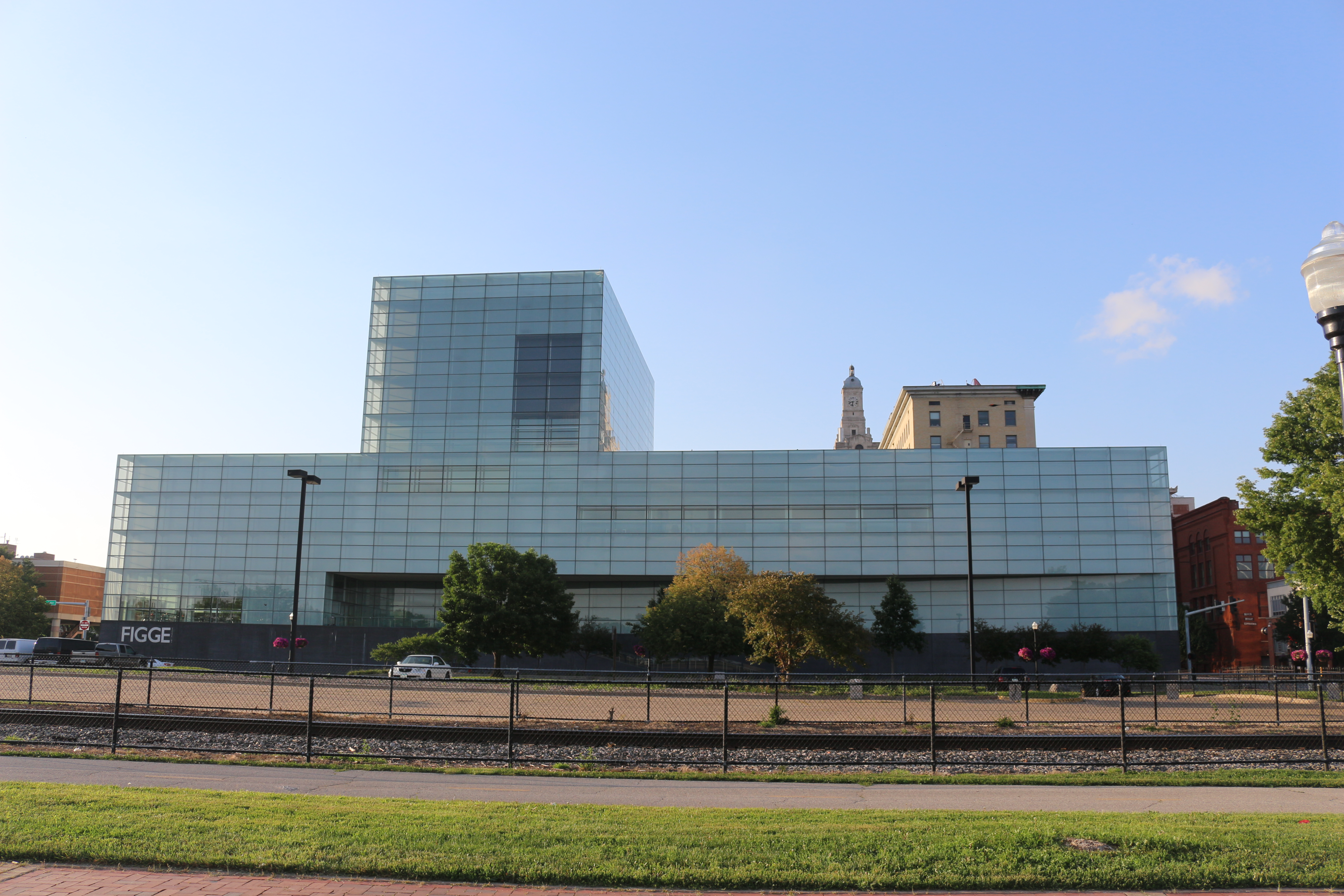
Figge Art Museum Davenport, Iowa 07-04-18 By Nate Woolsey
